= List of Late Night with Conan O'Brien episodes (season 3) =

This is a list of episodes for Season 3 of Late Night with Conan O'Brien, which aired from September 11, 1995, to September 13, 1996.

== Series overview ==
Season	Episodes	Originally aired	
Season	Episodes	First aired	Last aired
1	230	September 13, 1993	September 9, 1994
2	229	September 12, 1994	September 8, 1995
3	195	September 11, 1995	September 13, 1996
4	162	September 17, 1996	August 22, 1997
5	170	September 9, 1997	August 28, 1998
6	160	September 15, 1998	August 20, 1999
7	153	September 7, 1999	August 18, 2000
8	145	September 5, 2000	August 17, 2001
9	160	September 4, 2001	August 16, 2002
10	160	September 3, 2002	August 15, 2003
11	153	September 3, 2003	August 13, 2004
12	166	August 31, 2004	August 19, 2005
13	162	September 6, 2005	August 30, 2006
14	195	September 5, 2006	August 31, 2007
15	163	September 4, 2007	August 29, 2008
16	98	September 2, 2008	February 20, 2009

== Season 3 ==
No.	Original release date	Guest(s)	Musical/entertainment guest(s)
459	September 11, 1995	Garry Marshall, Lesley Stahl, Caroline Rhea	N/A
460	September 12, 1995	Deborah Norville, Jane Pratt, John Prine	N/A
461	September 13, 1995	Spike Lee, Frederique, Skastafarians	N/A
462	September 14, 1995	Al Roker, Vanessa Redgrave, Jud Hale	N/A
463	September 15, 1995	Fran Drescher, Judge Reinhold	Skee Lo
464	September 18, 1995	Jerry Hall, Jonathan Brandis, Lisa Birnbach	N/A
465	September 19, 1995	David Brenner, Tempestt Bledsoe, The Bottle Rockets	N/A
466	September 20, 1995	Michael Moore, Anka Radakovich, Heather Eatman	N/A
467	September 21, 1995	Courtney Thorne-Smith, Boy George, Brian McCann	N/A
468	September 22, 1995	John Laroquette, Andy Pargh, Anna Quindlen	N/A
469	September 25, 1995	Ellen Cleghorne, Clea Lewis, Colin Quinn	N/A
470	September 26, 1995	Scott Thompson, Holly Robinson Peete, David Lee Murphy	N/A
471	September 27, 1995	Tony Danza, P. J. O'Rourke, Rufus Thomas	N/A
472	September 28, 1995	Mariel Hemingway, Adam Arkin, Rondell Sheridan	N/A
473	September 29, 1995	Lea Thompson, Kathy Najimy	Deep Blue Something
474	October 2, 1995	Larry Miller, Lauren Hutton	Joan Osborne
475	October 3, 1995	LL Cool J, Blake Clark, Cindy Adams	N/A
476	October 4, 1995	Linda McCartney, Penelope Ann Miller	Ugly Kid Joe
477	October 5, 1995	Chevy Chase, Roma Downey, Veronica Webb	N/A
478	October 6, 1995	Mario Van Peebles, Leila Kenzle, The Meat Puppets	N/A
479	October 9, 1995	Jeff Foxworthy, Angie Everhart, David Hume Kennerly	N/A
480	October 10, 1995	George Foreman, Kylie Travis	Edwyn Collins
481	October 11, 1995	Paul Sorvino, Rich Hall, Joe Ely	N/A
482	October 12, 1995	Patrick Stewart, Shawn & Marlon Wayans, PJ Harvey	N/A
483	October 13, 1995	Jeff Stilson, Robin Leach, Jeff Greenfield	N/A
484	October 23, 1995	Janeane Garofalo, Ray Davies,	N/A
485	October 24, 1995	Larry King, Jeff Garlin	Johnnie Johnson
486	October 25, 1995	Suzanne Somers, Sharon Lawrence, William Wegman	N/A
487	October 26, 1995	Daphne Zuniga, Patrick Swayze, Malcolm Gets	N/A
488	October 27, 1995	Brian Williams, Ray Bradbury, Reggie McFadden	N/A
489	October 30, 1995	David Hasselhoff, Jim Fowler, Ty England	N/A
490	October 31, 1995	Dr. Ruth Westheimer (Dr. Ruth), Kevin Kilner, Bob Odenkirk & David Cross	N/A
491	November 1, 1995	Cathy Moriarty, Michael Kinsley, G. Love & Special Sauce	N/A
492	November 2, 1995	Jane Pauley, David Justice, Ronnie Hawkins	N/A
493	November 3, 1995	Tony Randall, Brian Austin Green, Steve Irwin	N/A
494	November 6, 1995	Loni Anderson, Nicholas Pileggi	UB40
495	November 7, 1995	Faye Dunaway, Carnie Wilson, Matt Graham	N/A
496	November 8, 1995	Reggie Miller, Ivana Trump	Cheap Trick
497	November 9, 1995	Norm Macdonald, Sam Waterston	Brandy
498	November 10, 1995	David Brenner, Jill Goodacre-Connick, Jeff Smith	N/A
499	November 13, 1995	Molly Ringwald, Fran Lebowitz	Big Audio Dynamite
500	November 14, 1995	Susan Lucci, Mario Cantone	King Crimson
501	November 15, 1995	Robert Klein, Thomas Hayden Church, Stan Lee	N/A
502	November 16, 1995	Ken Olin	N/A
503	November 17, 1995	Corbin Bernsen, Stan Lee, Alicia Witt	N/A
504	November 20, 1995	Martha Stewart, Mark Curry	Squeeze
505	November 21, 1995	Joey Lawrence, Lori Loughlin, Iris DeMent	N/A
506	November 22, 1995	Mimi Rogers, Jennifer Grey, Nils Lofgren	N/A
507	November 23, 1995	Darryl Hammond, The Gadget Guru, Jessica Hecht	N/A
508	November 24, 1995	Noah Wyle, Mary-Louise Parker, Stanley B. Goldenberg	N/A
509	November 27, 1995	Queen Latifah, Carol Channing	Seven Mary Three
510	November 28, 1995	Matt LeBlanc, The Fabulous Sports Babe	Jewel
511	November 29, 1995	Richard Lewis, Tabitha Soren, Steve and Leo	N/A
512	November 30, 1995	Valerie Bertinelli, Danny Bonaduce	Sponge with Kay Hanley
513	December 1, 1995	Michael Moore, Caroline Rhea, Amy Yasbeck	N/A
514	December 12, 1995	Garth Brooks, Kevin Brennan, Kimberly Williams	N/A
515	December 13, 1995	Jean-Claude Van Damme, B. D. Wong, Heather Nova	N/A
516	December 14, 1995	James Earl Jones, Josie Bissett, The Amps	N/A
517	December 15, 1995	Bonnie Hunt, Kevin McDonald, Tony Goldwyn	N/A
518	December 19, 1995	Mary Tyler Moore, Paul Prudhomme, Nick Bakay	N/A
519	December 20, 1995	Tony Bennett, Richie Sambora,	N/A
520	December 21, 1995	Greg Kinnear, Nora Dunn	Better Than Ezra
521	December 22, 1995	Kevin Pollak, Janeane Garofalo, Ronnie Spector	N/A
522	December 26, 1995	Nicholas Turturro, Carol Kane	Ben Folds Five
523	December 27, 1995	Fyvush Finkel, Dr. Fad (Ken Hakuta), Los Straitjackets	N/A
524	December 28, 1995	Al Roker, Carol Leifer, John Sencio	N/A
525	December 29, 1995	Lisa Kudrow, Frank Vincent, Gov't Mule	N/A
526	January 2, 1996	Gilbert Gottfried, Betty Faber, Marc Maron	N/A
527	January 3, 1996	Meat Loaf, Forest Whitaker	The Corrs
528	January 4, 1996	Cynthia Stevenson, Deborah Norville, Eric Weiss	N/A
529	January 5, 1996	Jim Breuer, Matt Frewer	Spacehog
530	January 16, 1996	Kevin Nealon, Gena Lee Nolin	Collective Soul
531	January 17, 1996	Bonnie Hunt, Kevin Meaney, Helen Martin	N/A
532	January 18, 1996	Norm Macdonald, Harland Williams, Loudon Wainwright	N/A
533	January 19, 1996	David Alan Grier, Illeana Douglas, John Pizzarelli	N/A
534	January 23, 1996	Robin Leach, Rich Hall, LabCabinCalifornia	N/A
535	January 24, 1996	Ellen Cleghorne, Diane Ladd, John Entwistle	N/A
536	January 25, 1996	Julianne Phillips, Wanda Sykes Hall, Mickey Gilley	N/A
537	January 26, 1996	Marla Maples Trump, Peter Weller, Lloyd Cole	N/A
538	January 30, 1996	Jonathan Silverman, Bill Bradley	No Doubt
539	January 31, 1996	Mary Steenburgen, Larry Brown, Pete Hamill	N/A
540	February 1, 1996	Jay Thomas, Rebecca Romijn	Aimee Mann
541	February 2, 1996	Claudia Schiffer, Ralph Harris, Joe Queenan	N/A
542	February 6, 1996	Maury Povich, RuPaul, McCoy Tyner Trio	N/A
543	February 7, 1996	Tyra Banks, Ian Bagg, Jerry Orbach	N/A
544	February 8, 1996	Mark Henry, Samantha Mathis, Grady	N/A
545	February 9, 1996	George Wendt, Michael Rapaport	Blur
546	February 13, 1996	TBA	N/A
547	February 14, 1996	Timothy Hutton, Anka Radakovich	John Hiatt & The Nashville Queens
548	February 15, 1996	Adam Sandler, Roger Ebert, Chris Jagger	N/A
549	February 16, 1996	Tom Arnold, Al Roker, Buck O'Neil	N/A
550	February 20, 1996	Martin Scorsese, Richard Belzer	Lisa Loeb & Nine Stories
551	February 21, 1996	David Brenner, Kathy Najimy, Pam Tillis	N/A
552	February 22, 1996	Sting, Kennedy, Dom Irrera	N/A
553	February 23, 1996	Ann-Margret, Al Franken, Darrell Hammond	N/A
554	February 27, 1996	Matt LeBlanc, James Cromwell, Big Sandy & His Fly-Rite Boys	N/A
555	February 28, 1996	Rowan Atkinson, Molly Shannon, Harry Shearer	N/A
556	February 29, 1996	Tom Brokaw, Rob Schneider, Jeff Stilson	N/A
557	March 1, 1996	Kelsey Grammer, Jill Hennessy, Speech	N/A
558	March 5, 1996	Hannah Storm, Holly Wartell, The Customers	N/A
559	March 6, 1996	Yasmine Bleeth, Owen Wilson, Joey Slotnick	N/A
560	March 7, 1996	Ellen Cleghorne, Tony V, Lennox Lewis	N/A
561	March 8, 1996	Chris Rock, Eric Schaeffer	Howard Jones
562	March 12, 1996	Tim Meadows, Patsy Kensit, Once Blue	N/A
563	March 13, 1996	Montel Williams, Rondell Sheridan, John Irving	N/A
564	March 14, 1996	John Goodman, Gloria Reuben, The Afghan Whigs	N/A
565	March 15, 1996	Sandra Bernhard, Marc Maron, Teddy Johnson	N/A
566	March 19, 1996	Ben Stiller, Joan Collins	Bad Religion
567	March 20, 1996	George Carlin, Jon Cryer, Robert Schimmel	N/A
568	March 21, 1996	Norm Macdonald, Richard E. Grant, Goldust	N/A
569	March 22, 1996	Loni Anderson, Thomas Haden Church	Anthrax
570	April 2, 1996	William Shatner, Anna Paquin, Fleming and John	N/A
571	April 3, 1996	Kim Coles, Pat Cooper, Barbara Anne Klein	N/A
572	April 4, 1996	Mary Tyler Moore, Dweezil and Ahmet Zappa, Son Volt	N/A
573	April 5, 1996	Nathan Lane, David Feldman, Martin Amis	N/A
574	April 9, 1996	Leonard Nimoy, Nancy Travis, Lewis Black	N/A
575	April 10, 1996	Scott Thompson, Lee Roy Parnell,	N/A
576	April 11, 1996	Tony Danza, Steve Forbes, God Street Wine	N/A
577	April 12, 1996	Marilu Henner, Dave Foley, Aldo Rafanelli	N/A
578	April 16, 1996	James Carville, Neve Campbell, Michael McDermott	N/A
579	April 17, 1996	Willie Nelson & Waylon Jennings, Amy Pietz	Barenaked Ladies
580	April 18, 1996	Teri Hatcher, Isaac Hayes, Jeff King and Cannon	N/A
581	April 19, 1996	Matthew Broderick, Todd Barry, Mark McKinney	N/A
582	April 23, 1996	Robert Klein, Mills Lane, Amanda Plummer	N/A
583	April 24, 1996	Janeane Garofalo, Vernon Chatman, Len Berman	N/A
584	April 25, 1996	Chris Penn, Colin Quinn	Sonic Youth
585	April 26, 1996	Chazz Palminteri, Angie Everhart	Cracker
586	April 30, 1996	Joan Lunden, H. Keith Melton, Eric Lutes	N/A
587	May 1, 1996	Gary Sinise, Marlo Thomas	Love and Rockets
588	May 2, 1996	Rob Morrow, Jeff Cesario, Fran Lebowitz	N/A
589	May 3, 1996	Pete Townshend, Nick Turturro	Dishwalla
590	May 7, 1996	Norm Macdonald, Wayne Newton	Tracy Bonham
591	May 8, 1996	Fabio Lanzoni, Margaret Smith, Ming-Na Wen	N/A
592	May 9, 1996	Christine Baranski, Robert Wuhl, Golden Smog	N/A
593	May 10, 1996	Ricki Lake, John Lithgow, World Champion Lumberjacks	N/A
594	May 14, 1996	Steven Wright, Jeffrey Tambor, The Mavericks	N/A
595	May 15, 1996	Richard Jeni, Robert Urich	Tori Amos
596	May 16, 1996	Jeff Foxworthy, Kate Mulgrew, Julie Scardina	N/A
597	May 17, 1996	Sharon Lawrence, Paul Nardizzi, Tony Roberts	N/A
598	May 21, 1996	TBA	N/A
599	May 22, 1996	Fran Drescher, James McDaniel	Everything but the Girl
600	May 23, 1996	Matt Lauer, Paul Provenza	Bo Diddley
601	May 24, 1996	Heather Locklear, Marc Maron,	N/A
602	May 28, 1996	Dr. Ruth Westheimer, Ron Silver, Chet Atkins	N/A
603	May 29, 1996	Charlie Sheen, Kristen Johnston, Buddy Lazier	N/A
604	May 30, 1996	Steve Young, Jack Gallagher, Miss Manners-Judith Martin	N/A
605	May 31, 1996	Al Roker, Mark Leyner, Johnny Bravo	N/A
606	June 4, 1996	TBA	N/A
607	June 5, 1996	David Brenner, RuPaul	The Refreshments
608	June 6, 1996	Alan King, Louis C.K., Kristy Swanson	N/A
609	June 7, 1996	Teri Garr, Lush, Granny Rodeo Champ	N/A
610	June 11, 1996	Norm Macdonald, Rita Rudner, Sonny Burgess & Rosie Flores	N/A
611	June 12, 1996	Dennis Franz, Dave Chappelle, Jack Corso	N/A
612	June 13, 1996	Bill Maher, Mario Joyner, Mike Lupica	N/A
613	June 14, 1996	Ben Stiller, Colin Quinn, The Mysteries of Life	N/A
614	June 18, 1996	Rosie O'Donnell, Rich Hall, Amy Ray	N/A
615	June 19, 1996	Ed McMahon, Heather Matarazzo	Goldfinger
616	June 20, 1996	Matthew Broderick, Rebecca Romijn	Duncan Sheik
617	June 21, 1996	Nick Turturro, John Davidson, Christa Miller	N/A
618	June 25, 1996	TBA	N/A
619	June 26, 1996	Mickey Rooney, Vanessa Marcil, Delinquent Habits	N/A
620	June 27, 1996	Chynna Phillips, Pat Cooper, Kid's inventions	N/A
621	June 28, 1996	Jane Pauley, Harold Ramis, Los Straitjackets	N/A
622	July 9, 1996	Marv Albert, Jean Reno, Alejandro Escovedo	N/A
623	July 10, 1996	George Foreman, Marla Maples Trump, Finn Brothers	N/A
624	July 11, 1996	TBA	N/A
625	July 12, 1996	Jim Fowler, Andrew Golota, Robert Loggia	N/A
626	July 16, 1996	Margaret Colin, Jonathan Katz, Rebecca Pidgeon	N/A
627	July 17, 1996	Kevin Nealon, Plácido Domingo,	N/A
628	July 18, 1996	Geraldo Rivera, Michelle Kwan, Dave Shaw	N/A
629	July 19, 1996	Andie MacDowell, Ewen Bremner, Jill Sobule	N/A
630	August 6, 1996	Gary Hall Jr., Dr. Joyce Brothers	N/A
631	August 7, 1996	Carl Lewis, Marc Maron, Travis Ford	N/A
632	August 8, 1996	TBA	N/A
633	August 9, 1996	Shannon Miller, Mia Kirshner, Allen Toussaint	N/A
634	August 13, 1996	TBA	N/A
635	August 14, 1996	Kevin Pollak, Jeremy Northam	A Tribe Called Quest
636	August 15, 1996	Jackie Chan, H. Keith Melton, Thora Birch	N/A
637	August 16, 1996	Kyra Sedgwick, Robert Altman, Soul Coughing	N/A
638	August 20, 1996	Jon Cryer, Carol Channing, Boyd Matson	N/A
639	August 21, 1996	Lisa Leslie, Deborah Norville	Hootie & the Blowfish
640	August 22, 1996	Richard Lewis, Angie Everhart, Ralph Harris	N/A
641	August 23, 1996	Robert Wuhl, Mario Van Peebles	311
642	August 27, 1996	Norm Macdonald, Alonzo Mourning	John Sebastian
643	August 28, 1996	Kyle MacLachlan, Monica Crowley	Lewis Black
644	August 29, 1996	Yasmine Bleeth, Edward Burns	Shania Twain
645	August 30, 1996	Robin Givens, Lara Flynn Boyle	N/A
646	September 3, 1996	Chuck Norris, Timothy Busfield, Superdrag	N/A
647	September 4, 1996	Mira Sorvino, David Paymer	Goo Goo Dolls
648	September 5, 1996	Corbin Bernsen, Lisa Rinna	Jars of Clay
649	September 6, 1996	James Carville, Mitch Fatel, Patricia Hearst	N/A
650	September 10, 1996	John Turturro, Colin Quinn, Keb' Mo'	N/A
651	September 11, 1996	Brian Williams, Jud Hale	Bryan Adams
652	September 12, 1996	Jay Thomas, Michael Moore	Laura Kightlinger
653	September 13, 1996	3rd Anniversary Special	N/A
