= List of Late Night with Conan O'Brien episodes (season 4) =

This is a list of episodes for Season 4 of Late Night with Conan O'Brien, which aired from September 17, 1996, to August 22, 1997.

== Series overview ==
| Season | Episodes | Originally aired | |
| Season | Episodes | First aired | Last aired |
|---|---|---|---|
| 1 | 230 | September 13, 1993 | September 9, 1994 |
| 2 | 229 | September 12, 1994 | September 8, 1995 |
| 3 | 195 | September 11, 1995 | September 13, 1996 |
| 4 | 162 | September 17, 1996 | August 22, 1997 |
| 5 | 170 | September 9, 1997 | August 28, 1998 |
| 6 | 160 | September 15, 1998 | August 20, 1999 |
| 7 | 153 | September 7, 1999 | August 18, 2000 |
| 8 | 145 | September 5, 2000 | August 17, 2001 |
| 9 | 160 | September 4, 2001 | August 16, 2002 |
| 10 | 160 | September 3, 2002 | August 15, 2003 |
| 11 | 153 | September 3, 2003 | August 13, 2004 |
| 12 | 166 | August 31, 2004 | August 19, 2005 |
| 13 | 162 | September 6, 2005 | August 30, 2006 |
| 14 | 195 | September 5, 2006 | August 31, 2007 |
| 15 | 163 | September 4, 2007 | August 29, 2008 |
| 16 | 98 | September 2, 2008 | February 20, 2009 |

== Season 4 ==
| No. | Original release date | Guest(s) | Musical/entertainment guest(s) |
|---|---|---|---|
| 654 | September 17, 1996 | Jon Stewart, Natasha Henstridge | The Cure |
| 655 | September 18, 1996 | Isabella Rossellini, Jeff Stilson, Art Buchwald | N/A |
| 656 | September 19, 1996 | Tyra Banks, Rich Hall, Alexi Lalas | N/A |
| 657 | September 20, 1996 | Raquel Welch, Tara Dawn Holland | Poe |
| 658 | September 24, 1996 | Tom Brokaw, Marc Maron | Republica |
| 659 | September 25, 1996 | Ellen DeGeneres, Daisy Fuentes, Paul Lukas | N/A |
| 660 | September 26, 1996 | Sarah Jessica Parker, Tim Meadows, Illeana Douglas | N/A |
| 661 | September 27, 1996 | Tori Spelling, Danny Aiello | Eels |
| 662 | October 1, 1996 | Jennifer Tilly, David Arquette | Rasputina |
| 663 | October 2, 1996 | Scott Thompson, Gina Gershon, Jeff Garlin | N/A |
| 664 | October 3, 1996 | Lisa Kudrow, Elizabeth Berkley, Fred Tuttle | N/A |
| 665 | October 4, 1996 | William Baldwin, Fisher Stevens | Riverdance |
| 666 | October 8, 1996 | Dr. Ruth Westheimer, Lewis Black, Renny Harlin | N/A |
| 667 | October 9, 1996 | Norm Macdonald, Steve Buscemi | The Connells |
| 668 | October 10, 1996 | Samuel L. Jackson, Chris Kattan, Julie Scardina | N/A |
| 669 | October 11, 1996 | Eric Idle, Peter Gallagher | Los Lobos |
| 670 | October 22, 1996 | Molly Ringwald, Tasha Smith | The Brian Setzer Orchestra |
| 671 | October 23, 1996 | Denis Leary, Abel Ferrara | Crash Test Dummies |
| 672 | October 24, 1996 | Mary Steenburgen, Ray Romano, Jon Favreau | N/A |
| 673 | October 25, 1996 | Jon Lovitz, Ally Walker | Rusted Root |
| 674 | October 29, 1996 | Dave Foley, Sandra Bernhard | The Lemonheads |
| 675 | October 30, 1996 | Bernie Williams, Steve Harvey, Jimmy Blaylock | N/A |
| 676 | October 31, 1996 | Dana Carvey, Garry Marshall | N/A |
| 677 | November 1, 1996 | Kathy Griffin | Phil Collins |
| 678 | November 6, 1996 | Brian Williams, Queen Latifah, Al Franken | They Might Be Giants |
| 679 | November 7, 1996 | David Hasselhoff, Dave Thomas, Billy Martin | N/A |
| 680 | November 8, 1996 | Richard Dean Anderson, Joe Queenan | Cake |
| 681 | November 12, 1996 | Dennis Miller, Ken Follett, Juliette Binoche | N/A |
| 682 | November 13, 1996 | Rob Schneider, Mimi Rogers | Carl Perkins |
| 683 | November 14, 1996 | Tony Randall, David Cross & Bob Odenkirk, Mike Lupica | N/A |
| 684 | November 15, 1996 | Elton John, Bob Saget | N/A |
| 685 | November 19, 1996 | Norm Macdonald, Robert Schimmel, James Doohan | N/A |
| 686 | November 20, 1996 | Emilio Estevez, The Frugal Gourmet | Ani DiFranco |
| 687 | November 21, 1996 | TBA | N/A |
| 688 | November 22, 1996 | Phil Hartman, Roger Ebert, Ken Shamrock | N/A |
| 689 | November 26, 1996 | Cindy Crawford, Julia Sweeney | Chris Isaak |
| 690 | November 27, 1996 | Sherry Stringfield, Kenny Rogers, Michael Novacek | N/A |
| 691 | November 28, 1996 | Tim Conway, Wayne Knight | Better Than Ezra |
| 692 | November 29, 1996 | Vanna White, Dave Chappelle | Jonathan Richman |
| 693 | December 10, 1996 | James Woods, Jay Mohr | John Pizzarelli |
| 694 | December 11, 1996 | Laura Dern, Ron Rifkin | Tracy Chapman |
| 695 | December 12, 1996 | Kevin Bacon, Bonnie Hunt, J.R. Havlin | N/A |
| 696 | December 13, 1996 | Penny Marshall, Richard Lewis, James Ellroy | N/A |
| 697 | December 17, 1996 | TBA | N/A |
| 698 | December 18, 1996 | Kenneth Branagh, Marc Maron | Mummenschanz |
| 699 | December 19, 1996 | Whoopi Goldberg, Jack Palance | Simply Red |
| 700 | December 20, 1996 | Barry Manilow, Neve Campbell | N/A |
| 701 | December 26, 1996 | Yasmine Bleeth, David Arquette | Béla Fleck and the Flecktones |
| 702 | December 27, 1996 | Dr. Ruth Westheimer, Lou Diamond Phillips, Dave Attel | N/A |
| 703 | December 31, 1996 | Molly Shannon, Scott Thompson | Barenaked Ladies |
| 704 | January 1, 1997 | Louis C.K., Joel Godard, Tracy Nelson | N/A |
| 705 | January 2, 1997 | Jim Fowler, Colin Quinn | Fountains of Wayne |
| 706 | January 3, 1997 | Janeane Garofalo, Don King, Emeril Lagasse | N/A |
| 707 | January 7, 1997 | Matt Lauer, Paula Abdul, Brian Regan | N/A |
| 708 | January 8, 1997 | Ray Liotta, David Blaine, Donna Hanover | N/A |
| 709 | January 9, 1997 | John Cleese, James Carville | Ashley MacIssac |
| 710 | January 10, 1997 | Marisa Tomei, Eugene Levy | The Reverend Horton Heat |
| 711 | January 21, 1997 | Don Rickles, G. Gordon Liddy | Jon Hendricks |
| 712 | January 22, 1997 | Steven Wright, Rebecca Romijn | Junior Brown |
| 713 | January 23, 1997 | Vendela, Pat Cooper | N/A |
| 714 | January 24, 1997 | Steve Guttenberg, Ted Alexandro, Rob Estes | N/A |
| 715 | January 28, 1997 | Jonathan Silverman, Levar Burton | Donald Knaack |
| 716 | January 29, 1997 | Suzanne Somers, Rich Hall | Luscious Jackson |
| 717 | January 30, 1997 | Desmond Howard, Rich Francese, Jim Lehrer | N/A |
| 718 | January 31, 1997 | Rodney Dangerfield, Karen Mulder | The Presidents Of The United States Of America |
| 719 | February 4, 1997 | Mary Tyler Moore, Eric Bogosian | Bill Burr |
| 720 | February 5, 1997 | John Leguizamo, Rod Steiger | The Cardigans |
| 721 | February 6, 1997 | Fran Drescher, William Shatner, Paul Lukas | N/A |
| 722 | February 7, 1997 | Pierce Brosnan, Billy Bob Thornton | Robert Palmer |
| 723 | February 11, 1997 | Tom Arnold, Tommy Davidson | Big Head Todd & The Monsters |
| 724 | February 12, 1997 | Geoffrey Rush, Wilt Chamberlain | Mary Chapin Carpenter |
| 725 | February 13, 1997 | Gene Siskel & Roger Ebert, Jeffrey Ross | N/A |
Note: Jennifer Lopez was scheduled to be the musical guest, but was cut due to time constraints.
| 726 | February 14, 1997 | Richard Harris, Jake Johannsen, Vivica A. Fox | N/A |
| 727 | February 18, 1997 | TBA | N/A |
| 728 | February 19, 1997 | Ben Stiller, Paul Nardizzi, Leon Gast | N/A |
| 729 | February 20, 1997 | Alec Baldwin, Penelope Ann Miller, Clyde Peeling | N/A |
| 730 | February 21, 1997 | Norm Macdonald, Christopher Guest | Sleeping Giants |
| 731 | February 25, 1997 | John Ritter, Melissa Joan Hart | The Smashing Pumpkins |
| 732 | February 26, 1997 | Ice-T, Dwight Yoakam, Jack Gallagher | N/A |
| 733 | February 27, 1997 | Sheryl Crow, Donna D'Errico | James Cotton |
| 734 | February 28, 1997 | Bob Costas, Merrill Markoe | Bonnie Raitt |
| 735 | March 11, 1997 | David Brenner, Salma Hayek | Kim Richey |
| 736 | March 12, 1997 | Al Roker, Bill Bellamy, Janine Ditullio | N/A |
| 737 | March 13, 1997 | Howard Stern, Lolita Davidovich | Freedy Johnston |
| 738 | March 14, 1997 | Sarah Jessica Parker, Anthony Clark, William H. Macy | N/A |
| 739 | March 18, 1997 | Mark Hamill, Carey Lowell | The Mighty Mighty Bosstones |
| 740 | March 19, 1997 | Nia Peeples, Yasmine Bleeth, Marc Maron | N/A |
| 741 | March 20, 1997 | Willem Dafoe, Famke Janssen, Hugh Fink | N/A |
| 742 | March 21, 1997 | Barbara Walters, Halle Berry | Morcheeba |
| 743 | April 1, 1997 | Debi Mazar, Jim Breuer, John Walsh | N/A |
| 744 | April 2, 1997 | Robin Leach, Tony Camin, Michael T. Weiss | N/A |
| 745 | April 3, 1997 | Pauly Shore, Bruno Kirby | Steve Earle & The V-Roys |
| 746 | April 4, 1997 | Jean-Claude Van Damme, Margaret Colin | Jonny Lang |
| 747 | April 8, 1997 | Rob Lowe, Ed McMahon, Frank McCourt | N/A |
| 748 | April 9, 1997 | Joan Lunden, Dweezil and Ahmet Zappa, Louis C.K. | N/A |
| 749 | April 10, 1997 | Justine Bateman | David Bowie |
| 750 | April 11, 1997 | John Waters, Stephanie Seymour | The Why Store |
| 751 | April 22, 1997 | Martin Mull, Ray Romano | Fiona Apple |
| 752 | April 23, 1997 | Corbin Bernsen, Frederique, Dr. Joyce Brothers | N/A |
| 753 | April 24, 1997 | Rob Schneider, Steven Weber | Radish |
| 754 | April 25, 1997 | Julianna Margulies, Dr. David Wright (physics), Courtland Mead | N/A |
| 755 | April 29, 1997 | Sinbad, Roy Clark | Deana Carter |
| 756 | April 30, 1997 | Joan Collins, Clea Lewis, David Sedaris | N/A |
| 757 | May 1, 1997 | Lisa Kudrow, Erik Estrada | Silverchair |
| 758 | May 2, 1997 | Luke Perry, Joey Lauren Adams, Ian Bagg | N/A |
| 759 | May 6, 1997 | Lea Thompson, Chris Kattan | Blackstreet |
| 760 | May 7, 1997 | Jerry Van Dyke, Andy Kindler, Judd Nelson | N/A |
| 761 | May 8, 1997 | Mike Myers, Jerry O'Connell | Tonic |
| 762 | May 9, 1997 | Billy Crystal, Wolfgang Puck | N/A |
| 763 | May 13, 1997 | Molly Shannon, Danny Aiello | Shawn Colvin |
| 764 | May 14, 1997 | Bob Dole, David Blaine, Tisha Campbell | N/A |
| 765 | May 15, 1997 | Norm Macdonald, Courtney Thorne-Smith | Collective Soul |
| 766 | May 16, 1997 | Mandy Patinkin, Doug E. Doug, Roxanne Ward | N/A |
| 767 | May 19, 1997 | Helen Hunt, Dick Clark, Brian Kiley | N/A |
| 768 | May 20, 1997 | Garry Marshall, Christa Miller | Mark Eitzel and Peter Buck |
| 769 | May 21, 1997 | Kevin Nealon, Tim Russert, Anka Radakovich | N/A |
| 770 | May 22, 1997 | Louie Anderson, Steve Irwin | N/A |
| 771 | May 23, 1997 | Matthew Broderick, Milla Jovovich | Jimmy Vivino |
| 772 | June 3, 1997 | Charlton Heston, Vince Vaughn | Pavement |
| 773 | June 4, 1997 | Michael Richards, Peta Wilson | Jamiroquai |
| 774 | June 5, 1997 | Kathleen Turner, Ken Ober | Matthew Sweet |
| 775 | June 6, 1997 | Tony Randall, Lewis Black, Jim Rome | N/A |
| 776 | June 10, 1997 | Farrah Fawcett, Arianna Huffington | Ben Folds Five |
| 777 | June 11, 1997 | Mike Vernon, Hunter S. Thompson, Victoria Silvstedt | N/A |
| 778 | June 12, 1997 | Gloria Reuben, Marc Maron | Third Eye Blind |
| 779 | June 13, 1997 | Spike Lee, David Arquette, Jeff Garlin | N/A |
| 780 | June 17, 1997 | George Carlin, Paulina Porizkova, Kevin Smith | N/A |
| 781 | June 18, 1997 | Darrell Hammond, Malcolm Gets, Jimmy Tingle | N/A |
| 782 | June 19, 1997 | Fabio Lanzoni, Jonathan Katz | Widespread Panic |
| 783 | June 20, 1997 | Thane Maynard, Rich Hall, | The Charlie Hunter Quartet |
| 784 | June 24, 1997 | Julia Sweeney, Dana Gould, George Plimpton | N/A |
| 785 | June 25, 1997 | Nick Turturro, Leonite Moore, Tate Donovan | N/A |
| 786 | June 26, 1997 | Al Roker, Will Ferrell | Del Amitri |
| 787 | June 27, 1997 | James Brown, Jonathan Taylor Thomas | N/A |
| 788 | July 8, 1997 | Dr. Ruth Westheimer, Kim Coles | Alison Krauss & Union Station |
| 789 | July 9, 1997 | Janeane Garofalo, Colin Quinn | Robert Earl Keen |
| 790 | July 10, 1997 | Paul McCartney, Martin Short | Jill Sobule |
| 791 | July 11, 1997 | Gina Gershon, Mike Veeck, Gary Valentine | N/A |
| 792 | July 15, 1997 | Tom Brokaw, Illeana Douglas, Leonard Garment | N/A |
| 793 | July 16, 1997 | Kenny Rogers, Dweezil and Ahmet Zappa | Primus |
| 794 | July 17, 1997 | Ed McMahon, Matthew Golombek | World Party |
| 795 | July 18, 1997 | Jim Fowler, Fran Lebowitz | John Fogerty |
| 796 | July 22, 1997 | The Smothers Brothers, Alexi Lalas | Fun Lovin' Criminals |
| 797 | July 23, 1997 | Isabella Rossellini, Thomas Haden Church, Jeffrey Ross | N/A |
| 798 | July 24, 1997 | David Alan Grier, Adam West | Sugar Ray |
| 799 | July 25, 1997 | Cyndi Lauper, "Mr. Food" Art Ginsberg, Ben Stein | N/A |
| 800 | July 29, 1997 | Dennis Franz, Scott Thompson, Rebecca Lobo | N/A |
| 801 | July 30, 1997 | Martin Sheen, Judith Martin | Steve Miller & Curtis Salgado |
| 802 | July 31, 1997 | Kevin Bacon, Laura Ingraham | Rickie Lee Jones |
| 803 | August 1, 1997 | Brendan Fraser, D.B. Sweeney, Patrice O'Neal | N/A |
| 804 | August 5, 1997 | Mary Black | N/A |
| 805 | August 6, 1997 | Garth Brooks | N/A |
| 806 | August 7, 1997 | Buckshot Lefonque | N/A |
| 807 | August 8, 1997 | Dave Foley, Myron Kandel, Clyde Peeling | N/A |
| 808 | August 12, 1997 | Sylvester Stallone, Loretta Lynn | Cool For August |
| 809 | August 13, 1997 | Wayne Newton, Madison Michelle | Southside Johnny |
| 810 | August 14, 1997 | Rosie Perez, Michael Rapaport | Wilco |
| 811 | August 15, 1997 | Brian Williams, Jeremy Northam, Michael James II | N/A |
| 812 | August 19, 1997 | Jerry Orbach, Christy Martin | Blues Traveler |
| 813 | August 20, 1997 | Jay Mohr, Charles S. Dutton, Dom Irrera | N/A |
| 814 | August 21, 1997 | Mira Sorvino, Marc Maron | Cake Like |
| 815 | August 22, 1997 | Anthony Quinn, Janine Turner | Taj Mahal |
