= List of Late Night with Conan O'Brien episodes (season 15) =

This is a list of episodes for Season 15 of Late Night with Conan O'Brien, which aired from September 4, 2007 to August 29, 2008.

== Series overview ==
Season	Episodes	Originally aired	
Season	Episodes	First aired	Last aired
1	230	September 13, 1993	September 9, 1994
2	229	September 12, 1994	September 8, 1995
3	195	September 11, 1995	September 13, 1996
4	162	September 17, 1996	August 22, 1997
5	170	September 9, 1997	August 28, 1998
6	160	September 15, 1998	August 20, 1999
7	153	September 7, 1999	August 18, 2000
8	145	September 5, 2000	August 17, 2001
9	160	September 4, 2001	August 16, 2002
10	160	September 3, 2002	August 15, 2003
11	153	September 3, 2003	August 13, 2004
12	166	August 31, 2004	August 19, 2005
13	162	September 6, 2005	August 30, 2006
14	195	September 5, 2006	August 31, 2007
15	163	September 4, 2007	August 29, 2008
16	98	September 2, 2008	February 20, 2009

== Season 15 ==
No.	Original release date	Guest(s)	Musical/entertainment guest(s)
2465	September 4, 2007	David Duchovny, Tim Gunn, Kevin Brennan	N/A
2466	September 5, 2007	Clive Owen, Alan Alda	Dinosaur Jr.
2467	September 6, 2007	Will Arnett, Terry Crews	Patti Scialfa
2468	September 7, 2007	Jeff Garlin, Nicholas Art	Hot Hot Heat
2469	September 10, 2007	Paul Giamatti, Alyson Hannigan	Bad Religion
2470	September 11, 2007	Richard Gere, Seann William Scott	The Chesterfield Kings
2471	September 12, 2007	Mary-Kate Olsen, Wayne Brady	Lyle Lovett
2472	September 13, 2007	Billy Bob Thornton, Sen. Chris Dodd	Kenny Chesney
2473	September 14, 2007	Patricia Heaton, Tiki Barber	The Used
2474	September 17, 2007	Morgan Freeman, Cheryl Hines	KT Tunstall
2475	September 18, 2007	Kelsey Grammer, Aries Spears	James Blunt
2476	September 19, 2007	Brad Garrett, Joy Behar	Rogue Wave
2477	September 20, 2007	Terrence Howard, Simon Pegg, Mystery	N/A
2478	September 21, 2007	Meredith Viera, Steven Wright	Ben Harper and the Innocent Criminals
2479	September 24, 2007	Bob Costas, Jim Gaffigan	Rilo Kiley
2480	September 25, 2007	Jamie Foxx, Heather Graham, Mike Birbiglia	N/A
2481	September 26, 2007	Ted Danson, Patton Oswalt	Devendra Banhart
2482	September 27, 2007	Dwayne "The Rock" Johnson, Ed Helms	Bjork
2484	September 28, 2007	Jerry O'Connell, Ken Burns	VHS or Beta
2485	October 2, 2007	Ted Koppel, Jason Schwartzman, Dana Gould	N/A
2486	October 3, 2007	Tina Fey, Kenneth Branagh	Ani DiFranco
2487	October 4, 2007	Snoop Dogg, Connie Britton	Bloc Party
2488	October 5, 2007	Jennifer Connelly, Fred Willard	Animal Collective
2489	October 8, 2007	Joaquin Phoenix, Jim Gaffigan	Paramore
2490	October 9, 2007	Mark Wahlberg, Michael Strahan	The Black Lips
2491	October 10, 2007	Tracy Morgan, Emile Hirsch, A.J. Jacobs	N/A
2492	October 11, 2007	Jon Bon Jovi, Eva Mendes	Klaxons
2493	October 15, 2007	Anderson Cooper, Paget Brewster	Fionn Regan
2494	October 16, 2007	Jake Gyllenhaal, Christina Hendricks	Ghostland Observatory
2495	October 17, 2007	Anthony Hopkins, Joe Buck	Mute Math
2496	October 18, 2007	John Cusack, James Lipton	Spoon
2497	October 19, 2007	Josh Hartnett, Jack McBrayer	Brother Ali
2498	October 29, 2007	Charles Barkley, William Baldwin	Seether
2499	October 30, 2007	Ethan Hawke, Susie Essman	Zappa Plays Zappa
2500	October 31, 2007	Brian Williams, Roger Daltrey	Manchester Orchestra
2501	November 1, 2007	Dane Cook, Emily Mortimer	Slash
2502	November 2, 2007	Jerry Seinfeld, David Ortiz	Sondre Lerche
2503	January 2, 2008	Bob Saget, Dwayne Perkins	Robert Gordon and Chris Spedding
2504	January 3, 2008	Megan Mullally, Fonzworth Bentley	Kid Rock
2505	January 4, 2008	Bill Maher, Jim Cramer, Mike DeStefano	N/A
2506	January 7, 2008	Hulk Hogan, Regina Hall	Nicole Atkins & the Sea
2507	January 8, 2008	Donald Trump, Irina Markova	Sia
2508	January 9, 2008	Ice Cube, Dr. Drew Pinsky	Marah
2509	January 10, 2008	Howie Mandel, Leigh Killian	Kate Nash
2510	January 11, 2008	Brian Williams, David Wondrich	Doyle and Debbie
2511	January 14, 2008	Lester Holt, Sue Johanson	Ingrid Michaelson
2512	January 15, 2008	Tom Brokaw, Anthony Jeselnik	Bell X1
2513	January 16, 2008	Pink, Lou Dobbs	Bettye LaVette
2514	January 17, 2008	Chazz Palminteri, Erin Burnett	Louis XIV
2515	January 18, 2008	Bret Michaels, Antonio Pierce	Lisa Loeb
2516	January 28, 2008	Jim Gaffigan, Chuck Liddell	Joe Nichols
2517	January 29, 2008	David Gregory, Travis Pastrana	Kate Walsh
2518	January 30, 2008	Jeff Corwin, Colin Hanks	Matt Nathanson
2519	January 31, 2008	Dr. Phil McGraw, David Borgenicht	Les Savy Fav
2520	February 1, 2008	Shawn Thayer, Ingrid Backstrom	The Blind Boys of Alabama
2521	February 4, 2008	Ann Curry, Mike Epps,	OneRepublic
2522	February 5, 2008	Michael Strahan, Sarah Bolger	Sheryl Crow
2523	February 6, 2008	The Great Throwdini, Donny Deutsch	The Dillinger Escape Plan
2524	February 7, 2008	Izabel Goulart, Len Berman	Nada Surf
2525	February 8, 2008	Professor Peter H. Fisher, Dr. Bob Arnot	Eric Lindell
2526	February 11, 2008	Carson Kressley, Greg Kot and Jim DeRogatis	Catherine Russell
2527	February 12, 2008	Jim Cramer, José Andrés	Band of Horses
2528	February 13, 2008	Matt Lauer, Ryan Reynolds	Simple Plan
2529	February 14, 2008	Martin Short, Ray Allen	The Kooks
2530	February 15, 2008	Neil Patrick Harris, Daniella Sarahyba	Yeasayer
2531	February 18, 2008	Larry the Cable Guy, Tim Gunn	Jim Lauderdale
2532	February 19, 2008	Anderson Cooper, Bill Hader	Jake Shimabukuro
2533	February 20, 2008	Randy Jackson, Artie Lange	The Whigs
2534	February 21, 2008	Barbara Walters, Wladimir Klitschko	Black Mountain
2535	February 22, 2008	Nathan Lane, Michel Gondry	Secondhand Serenade
2536	February 25, 2008	Will Arnett, Flavor Flav	Super Furry Animals
2537	February 26, 2008	Will Ferrell, Rashida Jones, Fred Simmons	N/A
2538	February 27, 2008	Tom Arnold, Todd Barry	Georgie James
2539	February 28, 2008	Natalie Portman, Robert Schimmel	James Blunt
2540	February 29, 2008	Christina Ricci, Jason Sudeikis	Shooter Jennings
2541	March 10, 2008	Paul Giamatti, Mark Moffett	Jaymay
2345	March 11, 2008	Jonah Hill, John Tesh	Drive-By Truckers
2346	March 12, 2008	Snoop Dogg, Carson Daly	N/A
2544	March 13, 2008	Meredith Viera, Harland Williams, Keith Robinson	N/A
2545	March 14, 2008	Frank Caliendo, Cheryl Hines	The Bad Plus
2546	March 17, 2018	Martha Stewart, Lance Krall	Billy Bragg
2547	March 18, 2008	Ice-T, Brian Posehn	Stars
2548	March 19, 2008	Tracy Morgan, Chris Hansen	Paul Thorn
2549	March 20, 2008	Drake Bell	Yael Naim
2551	March 21, 2008	Bob Costas, Marc Maron	Moby
2552	April 1, 2008	Helen Mirren, Wylie Gustafson	Carbon/Silicon
2553	April 2, 2008	John Leguizamo, George Takei	The Bravery
2554	April 3, 2008	John Krasinski, Bode Miller	Cobra Starship
2555	April 4, 2008	Christina Applegate, Lewis Black, Stephen Curry	N/A
2556	April 7, 2008	George Wendt, Howard Bach	Hot Chip
2557	April 8, 2008	Jarod Miller, David Gregory, John Oliver	N/A
2558	April 9, 2008	Eddie Izzard, Morgan Spurlock	Tapes 'n Tapes
2559	April 10, 2008	Sarah Jessica Parker, Aries Spears	They Might Be Giants
2560	April 11, 2008	Patrick Stewart, Oliver Hudson	A.A. Bondy
2561	April 21, 2008	Rachael Ray, Kal Penn	Grizzly Bear
2562	April 22, 2008	Andy Richter, Jennifer Esposito	She & Him
2563	April 23, 2008	Seth Green, Peter Greenberg	Radiohead
2564	April 24, 2008	Amy Poehler, Danica Patrick, Dave Attell	N/A
2565	April 25, 2008	Tina Fey, Fred Willard	Say Anything
2368	April 28, 2008	Marisa Tomei, Anthony Anderson	Santogold
2567	April 29, 2008	Jeff Garlin, Dax Shepard	The Kills
2568	April 30, 2008	Gordon Ramsay, Rob Corddry	Feist
2569	May 1, 2008	Sigourney Weaver, Darrell Hammond	Was (Not Was)
2570	May 2, 2008	Matthew Broderick, Michelle Monaghan, Brian Turner	N/A
2571	May 5, 2008	Patricia Heaton, Katt Williams	Thrice
2571	May 6, 2008	Jason Lee, Eva Amurri	Galactic
2573	May 7, 2008	Liam Neeson, B. J. Novak	The Duke Spirit
2574	May 8, 2008	Emile Hirsch, Terrell Owens, Craig Baldo	N/A
2575	May 9, 2008	Seth Meyers, Sophia Bush	Tokio Hotel
2576	May 12, 2008	Jimmy Fallon, William Shatner, Gary Vaynerchuk	N/A
2379	May 13, 2008	Steve Carell, Alyson Hannigan	Duffy
2578	May 14, 2008	Brian Williams, Leighton Meester	The Black Keys
2580	May 16, 2008	Alan Alda, John Cena	Everest
2581	May 19, 2008	Kevin Nealon, Mary McCormack	DeVotchKa
2582	May 20, 2008	Denis Leary, Anthony Bourdain	Mates of State
2583	May 21, 2008	Harrison Ford, Eric McCormack	Atmosphere
2584	May 22, 2008	Kevin Spacey, Cynthia Nixon, Brian Kiley	N/A
2585	May 23, 2008	Kristin Davis, Ira Glass	Ryan Bingham
2586	May 27, 2008	"The Strike Beard Show"	N/A
2587	May 28, 2008	Jon Bon Jovi, Eva Mendes	Bon Jovi
2588	June 2, 2008	Seann William Scott, Tim Meadows	The Raconteurs
2589	June 3, 2008	Colin Firth, Hugh Rowland	Jackie Greene
2590	June 4, 2008	Adam Sandler, Werner Herzog	Jewel
2591	June 5, 2008	Wanda Sykes, Emanuelle Chriqui, Lewis Black	N/A
2592	June 6, 2008	Kim Cattrall, Matt Taibbi	Lightspeed Champion
2593	June 9, 2008	Kate Hudson, Robert Smigel	James Hunter
2594	June 10, 2008	Jeff Corwin, Mario Lopez	Jamie Lidell
2595	June 11, 2008	Mark Wahlberg, Louis C.K.	Sharon Jones & the Dap-Kings
2596	June 12, 2008	Randy Jackson, Piper Perabo	Forever the Sickest Kids
2597	June 13, 2008	Michael Strahan, D.L. Hughley, Brian Scolaro	N/A
2598	June 16, 2008	Ann Curry, Mario Batali	The Lordz
2599	June 17, 2008	Megan Mullally, Brittany Snow	Detroit Octane
2600	June 18, 2008	Mike Myers, Jordana Spiro	Dolphina
2601	June 19, 2008	Anne Hathaway, Romany Malco	My Morning Jacket
2602	June 20, 2008	Jason Bateman, Masi Oka	Alejandro Escovedo
2603	July 7, 2008	Ted Koppel, Emily Mortimer	Steel Train
2604	July 8, 2008	Selma Blair, Sig Hansen	Little Jackie
2605	July 9, 2008	Kyra Sedgwick, Jim Cramer	Joe Cocker
2606	July 10, 2008	Al Roker, Paul Pierce	Pilobolus
2607	July 11, 2008	Sean Hayes, Ed Helms, Tom Papa	N/A
2608	July 14, 2008	Gary Oldman, Joe Buck	Kenny Chesney
2609	July 15, 2008	Heidi Klum, Joel McHale	Daryl Hall & K.T. Tunstall
2610	July 16, 2008	Meryl Streep, Russell Brand, Eugene Mirman	N/A
2611	July 17, 2008	Aaron Eckhart, Caroline Rhea	Dr. Dog
2612	July 18, 2008	Sen. John McCain	The Steeldrivers
2613	July 28, 2008	Carson Kressley, Keke Palmer	The Ting Tings
2614	July 29, 2008	Jason Sudeikis, Wladimir Klitschko	Rose Hill Drive
2615	July 30, 3008	Kevin Costner, Maria Bello	Yuto Miyazawa & Gogol Bordello
2616	July 31, 2008	Nathan Lane, Dylan Ratigan	Missy Higgins
2617	August 1, 2008	Brendan Fraser, Steve Schirripa	The Airborne Toxic Event
2618	August 4, 2008	America Ferrera, Judd Apatow, Dwayne Perkins	N/A
2619	August 5, 2008	Seth Meyers, Sharon Osbourne	N.E.R.D.
2620	August 6, 2008	Javier Bardem, Danny McBride	The B-52s
2621	August 7, 2008	Seth Rogen, Philippe Petit	Al Green
2622	August 8, 2008	Kiefer Sutherland, Jim Gaffigan	Mason Jennings
2623	August 25, 2008	Daniel Radcliffe, Steve Coogan	N/A
2624	August 26, 2008	Vin Diesel, Dave Attell	The Virgins
2625	August 27, 2008	Tiger Woods, Vanessa Minnillo	Jimmy Carr
2626	August 28, 2008	Aaron Peirsol, Anthony Anderson	Lykke Li
2627	August 29, 2008	Bob Costas, Sophia Bush	The Spring Standards
