= List of Late Night with Conan O'Brien episodes (season 14) =

This is a list of episodes for Season 14 of Late Night with Conan O'Brien, which aired from September 5, 2006 to August 31, 2007.

== Series overview ==
Season	Episodes	Originally aired	
Season	Episodes	First aired	Last aired
1	230	September 13, 1993	September 9, 1994
2	229	September 12, 1994	September 8, 1995
3	195	September 11, 1995	September 13, 1996
4	162	September 17, 1996	August 22, 1997
5	170	September 9, 1997	August 28, 1998
6	160	September 15, 1998	August 20, 1999
7	153	September 7, 1999	August 18, 2000
8	145	September 5, 2000	August 17, 2001
9	160	September 4, 2001	August 16, 2002
10	160	September 3, 2002	August 15, 2003
11	153	September 3, 2003	August 13, 2004
12	166	August 31, 2004	August 19, 2005
13	162	September 6, 2005	August 30, 2006
14	195	September 5, 2006	August 31, 2007
15	163	September 4, 2007	August 29, 2008
16	98	September 2, 2008	February 20, 2009

== Season 14 ==
No.	Original release date	Guest(s)	Musical/entertainment guest(s)
2270	September 5, 2006	Julianne Moore, Aries Spears	Godsmack
2271	September 6, 2006	David Duchovny, Greg Behrendt	OK Go
2272	September 7, 2006	Kiefer Sutherland, Joely Fisher	Ben Harper
2273	September 8, 2006	Alan Alda, Sophia Bush	Citizen Cope
2274	September 12, 2006	Zach Braff, Artie Lange	John Mayer
2275	September 13, 2006	Ashton Kutcher, Tracy Morgan	John Mayer
2276	September 14, 2006	Dwayne "The Rock" Johnson, Al Franken	Bjorn Turoque
2277	September 15, 2006	Matthew Perry, Xzibit	The Rapture
Sketches include: Guy Who Is Always Confused About Future Guests
2278	September 18, 2006	Gisele Bundchen, Jim Cramer	Madeline Peyroux
Sketches include: NFL on NBC: Made for TV Movie, Rude Audience Member
2279	September 19, 2006	Johnny Knoxville, Caroline Rhea	Bonnie "Prince" Billy
2280	September 20, 2006	Bob Newhart, Elle Macpherson, Jimmy Carr	N/A
Sketches include: How Many Ears?
2281	September 21, 2006	Jennifer Love Hewitt, John Krasinski	Ben Kweller
2282	September 22, 2006	Jason Lee, Bridget Moynahan	Chingy
2283	September 25, 2006	Marcia Cross, David Gregory	Sam Moore
2284	September 26, 2006	Christopher Walken, Michael Clarke Duncan	Scissor Sisters
2285	September 27, 2006	Billy Bob Thornton, Mr. T	The Wreckers
2286	September 28, 2006	John Stamos, Amy Poehler, Nigella Lawson	N/A
2287	September 29, 2006	Bob Costas, David Cross	Phoenix
2288	October 2, 2006	Dennis Miller, Rachael Ray	Evanescence
2289	October 3, 2006	Martin Scorsese, Harland Williams	The Decemberists
2290	October 4, 2006	Brian Williams, Scott Wolf, Larry Miller	N/A
2291	October 5, 2006	Jaime Pressly, Jerome Bettis	Jerry Lee Lewis
2292	October 6, 2006	Alex Trebek, Yunjin Kim	Barenaked Ladies
2293	October 9, 2006	John Lithgow, Lewis Black	Gomez
Sketches include:Cheer Up, Yankees, Toshi Memories
2294	October 10, 2006	Alec Baldwin, John Cena, Demetri Martin	N/A
2295	October 11, 2006	Sarah Michelle Gellar, Bob Saget	Robert Randolph & the Family Band
2296	October 12, 2006	Helen Mirren, Jim Gaffigan	Basement Jaxx
2297	October 13, 2006	Jason Schwartzman, Arielle Kebbel	Jenny Lewis
2298	October 16, 2006	Regis Philbin, Alessandra Ambrosio	Dierks Bentley
Sketches include: Kids Drawings, Queen Elizabeth via Telephone, I Love This Town Guy
2299	October 17, 2006	Tina Fey, Steven Wright	Barbara Stewart
Sketches include: Meet Mr. Met, GE Satellite Channels,
2300	October 18, 2006	Kirsten Dunst, Harry Shearer	Corinne Bailey Rae
Sketches include: Noches de Pasion con Señor O'Brien (Nights of Passion with Mr. O'Brien), Clutch Cargo (Wesley Snipes & Mike Tyson),
2301	October 19, 2006	Nathan Lane, Jason Sudeikis	Ben Folds
2302	October 20, 2006	Diddy, Joe Buck	Frank Black
2303	October 30, 2006	Charles Barkley, Kristin Chenoweth	Cat Power
Sketches include: LaBamba's Tie, If They Mated, Rude Audience Member
2304	October 31, 2006	Larry King, Omar Epps, Sheila Kelley (The Skeleton Show),	N/A
2305	November 1, 2006	Borat Sagdiyev, Jack McBrayer	Mastodon
Sketches include: 2006 Stony Awards, Actual Items
2306	November 2, 2006	John Leguizamo, Arden Myrin	Los Abandoned
2307	November 3, 2006	Darrell Hammond, Jesse Bradford, Prof. Kevin Warwick	N/A
Sketches include: Conan's Ford Taurus Tribute, Good Priest Bad Priest,
2308	November 6, 2006	Russell Crowe, Jorge Garcia	Dean Karnazes
2309	November 8, 2006	Will Ferrell, Tom Everett Scott	Death Cab for Cutie
2310	November 9, 2006	Howie Mandel, James Lipton	Mat Kearney
2311	November 10, 2006	Meredith Vieira, Greg Grunberg	Old Crow Medicine Show
Sketches include: Rockefeller Center Tree Photos
2312	November 13, 2006	Barbara Walters, Dax Shepard	Los Lobos
2313	November 14, 2006	Robin Williams, Christian Slater	Panic! at the Disco
2314	November 15, 2006	Jack Black & Kyle Gass, Joshua Jackson	Tenacious D
2315	November 16, 2006	Elijah Wood, Jon Lovitz, Jud Hale	N/A
2316	November 17, 2006	Martin Short, Flavor Flav	Damien Rice
2317	November 20, 2006	Rachel Weisz, Masi Oka	Army of Anyone
2318	November 21, 2006	James Spader, Amy Sedaris	Robyn Hitchcock
2319	November 22, 2006	Will Arnett, Alyson Hannigan	Billy Talent
2320	November 23, 2006	Ethan Hawke, Jim Gaffigan	Brand New Heavies
2321	November 24, 2006	Hugh Jackman, Tiki Barber	Mike Birbiglia
Sketches include: Satellite Channels
2322	November 27, 2006	Matthew Broderick, Lisa Edelstein	Jet
2323	November 28, 2006	Jude Law, Kristen Wiig	The Brian Setzer Orchestra
2324	November 29, 2006	Martha Stewart, Brian Posehn	My Morning Jacket
2325	November 30, 2006	Lucy Liu, Tillie the Canine Artist,	N/A
2326	December 1, 2006	Tom Brokaw, Ed Helms	Sarah McLachlan
2327	December 4, 2006	Jennifer Connelly, Jason Segel	Joan Jett and the Blackhearts
2328	December 5, 2006	Kevin Nealon, Angela Kinsey	Deftones
2329	December 6, 2006	Rob Lowe, Rashida Jones	Drake Bell
2330	December 7, 2006	Julianna Margulies, Aries Spears, Mike Lupica	N/A
2331	December 8, 2006	Chazz Palminteri, Seth Meyers	TV on the Radio
2332	December 11, 2006	Cameron Diaz, Dennis Haysbert	Dashboard Confessional
2333	December 12, 2006	Ricky Gervais, Steven R. Schirripa	The Matt Savage Trio
Sketches include: Rocket Me Nowhere's song for the Horny Manatee, "My Hopeless Manatee
2334	December 13, 2006	Jeremy Irons, Terry Crews	Aimee Mann
2335	December 14, 2006	Howard Stern, Jim Gaffigan	N/A
2336	December 15, 2006	Sylvester Stallone, Carla Gugino	Matt Mays & El Torpedo
2337	December 18, 2006	Patricia Heaton, Jason Ritter	Tony Bennett
2338	December 19, 2006	Ben Stiller, Ving Rhames	Joshua Bell
2339	December 20, 2006	Andy Samberg, Stuart Scott	Sean Lennon
Sketches include: Clutch Cargo (Donald Trump), Jade Dragon Gift Distribution Services
2340	December 21, 2006	Ewan McGregor, Manny Puig	Jordana Spiro
2341	December 22, 2006	Carson Daly, Michelle Trachtenberg	Nellie McKay
Sketches include: New Holiday Stamps, Classic Holiday Specials
2342	January 2, 2007	LL Cool J, Abigail Breslin	Gov't Mule
2343	January 3, 2007	Plácido Domingo, Patton Oswalt	moe.
Sketches include: 2006 In Review, Sleeping Pender
2344	January 4, 2007	Jarod Miller, Dulé Hill, Louis C.K.	N/A
Sketches include: Actual Items
2345	January 5, 2007	Cedric the Entertainer, Orlando Jones	John Pizzarelli
Sketches include:Clutch Cargo (Donald Trump), Conan and Max Visit the Rockefeller Center Observation Deck
2346	January 8, 2007	Matt Lauer, America Ferrera	Little Big Town
2347	January 9, 2007	Donald Trump, Meagan Good	Ron Sexsmith
Sketches include: Late Night Little Guy
2348	January 10, 2007	David Arquette, Lonny Ross, Chuck "The Iceman" Liddell	N/A
Sketches include: New Characters for 2007
2349	January 11, 2007	Hilary Swank, Artie Lange	The Black Keys
2350	January 12, 2007	Kiefer Sutherland, Jill Hennessy	Gym Class Heroes
Sketches include: Clutch Cargo (George W. Bush, Barbara Bush, Donald Trump)
2351	January 16, 2007	Tracy Morgan, Jim Gaffigan	Sparta
Sketches include: Tribute on Nutz: A Tribute to the Slipnutz
2352	January 17, 2007	Brian Williams, Dominic Purcell, Dana Gould	N/A
Sketches include: Horny Manatee, The Weather Channel: The Complete First Season DVD commercial
2353	January 18, 2007	Megan Mullally, Colin Hanks	Annuals
2354	January 19, 2007	Liam Neeson, Ali Larter	Brand New
2355	January 29, 2007	Brad Garrett, Sarah Silverman	Peter Bjorn and John
Sketches include: Conan's Daughter
2356	January 30, 2007	Kristin Davis, Bob Saget	Paolo Nutini
2357	January 31, 2007	Sienna Miller, Goran Višnjić	Paul Weller
Sketches include: Rude Audience Member
2358	February 1, 2007	Serena Williams, Donal Logue, Kevin Brennan	N/A
2359	February 2, 2007	Charlize Theron, Bill Hader	Stars of Track and Field
Sketches include: The 128th Annual Ground Vigoda Day
2360	February 5, 2007	Kristin Chenoweth, Mindy Kaling	The Slip
2361	February 6, 2007	Dr. Phil McGraw, Emily Deschanel	Calexico
2362	February 7, 2007	Cuba Gooding, Jr., Joy Behar, Jonathan Katz	N/A
2363	February 8, 2007	Bob Costas, Ashley Tisdale	Josh Groban
2364	February 9, 2007	Dylan McDermott, Michael Urie	Lamb of God
Sketches include: The Interrupter
2365	February 12, 2007	Martin Lawrence, Hayden Panettiere	Hinder
2366	February 13, 2007	Eva Longoria, Fred Willard	Lily Allen
2367	February 14, 2007	Drew Barrymore, Marc Maron	The Apples in Stereo
Sketches include: Throwing Snowballs at Brian Williams, Valentine's Day Survival Guide, Visit from "Christopher Dodd"
2368	February 15, 2007	Nicolas Cage, Natalie Morales, John Mulaney	N/A
2369	February 16, 2007	Christina Ricci, Alan Cumming	Joshua Radin
2370	February 19, 2007	Sen. Chuck Schumer, Tracee Ellis Ross	The Holmes Brothers
2371	February 20, 2007	Heather Graham, Lewis Black	Explosions in the Sky
2372	February 21, 2007	Jim Carrey, Al Roker	Jonny Lives!
Sketches include: Late Night Lies, Conan On The Aisle: Oscars Edition
2373	February 22, 2007	Jimmy Fallon, Keith Olbermann, Steven Kaplan	N/A
Sketches include: Max Winestain
2374	February 23, 2007	Billy Bob Thornton, J. Alexander, G. Love	G. Love
2375	February 26, 2007	Jim Gaffigan, Liev Schreiber	Solomon Burke
2376	February 27, 2007	Jake Gyllenhaal, Lance Armstrong	Bayside
Sketches include: In The Year 2000 (Fallon Edition)
2377	February 28, 2007	Larry King, Izabel Goulart, "Biscuit Lady" Carol Fay	N/A
2378	March 1, 2007	Anderson Cooper, Rob Corddry	Son Volt
Sketches include: Dubble Letter Week, USA, Red White & Blue! Everyone Hates Us, So Let's See What We Can Do!, Conan's Wallet
2379	March 2, 2007	Ted Koppel, Tom Cavanagh	Relient K
2380	March 12, 2007	David Hyde Pierce, Kate Mara	Dr. Dog
Sketches include: Rude Audience Member
2381	March 13, 2007	Chris Rock, Christopher Meloni	Mary Weiss with The Reigning Sound
Sketches include: Conan Interrogates Pierre Bernard
2382	March 14, 2007	Andy Richter, Len Berman	The Shins
2383	March 15, 2007	Julia Louis-Dreyfus, Harland Williams, Neil deGrasse Tyson	N/A
2384	March 16, 2007	Jeff Goldblum, Ivanka Trump	Pete Yorn
2385	March 19, 2007	Tom Arnold, Rainn Wilson	Jesse Malin
2386	March 20, 2007	Bernie Mac, Chris Hansen	Daughtry
Sketches include: Actual Items
2387	March 21, 2007	Don Cheadle, Neil Patrick Harris, Shane Mauss	N/A
2388	March 22, 2007	Adam Sandler, Sarah Thyre	Lindsey Buckingham
2389	March 23, 2007	Liv Tyler, Gerard Butler	The Fratellis
2390	April 2, 2007	Quentin Tarantino, Jesse L. Martin, Brian Kiley	N/A
Sketches include: SAT Analogies, Lullaby
2391	April 3, 2007	Rosario Dawson, Jason Sudeikis	Martina McBride
2392	April 4, 2007	Ice Cube, B. J. Novak	Clap Your Hands Say Yeah
2393	April 5, 2007	Diddy, David Gregory	Kaiser Chiefs
2394	April 6, 2007	Michael Imperioli, Jim Cramer	Albert Hammond, Jr.
2395	April 9, 2007	Jeff Daniels, Zoë Bell	The Alternate Routes
2396	April 10, 2007	Martin Short, Cheryl Hines	Cold War Kids
2397	April 11, 2007	Tina Fey, Kevin Pollak, Mystery	N/A
2398	April 12, 2007	Molly Shannon, Tiki Barber	Of Montreal
2399	April 13, 2007	Ray Liotta, Mary Lynn Rajskub	Joseph Arthur & The Lonely Astronauts
2400	April 24, 2007	Martha Stewart, Rob Huebel, Ian Edwards	N/A
Sketches include: Noches de Pasion con Señor O'Brien (Nights of Passion with Mr. O'Brien)
2401	April 25, 2007	Darrell Hammond, Andrew W.K.	Blue October
2402	April 26, 2007	Tyra Banks, Masi Oka	Brandi Carlile
Sketches include: New State Quarters
2403	April 27, 2007	Garry Shandling, Adam Brody	Ricky Skaggs & Bruce Hornsby
2404	April 30, 2007	Dana Carvey, Jasper Redd (San Francisco Show)	Arctic Monkeys
2405	May 1, 2007	George Lucas, Will Arnett (San Francisco Show)	Chris Isaak
2406	May 2, 2007	Robin Williams (San Francisco Show)	The Glide Ensemble
2407	May 3, 2007	Randy Jackson, Patton Oswalt, Frisbee Golf National Champion David Feldberg (San Francisco Show)	RatDog
2408	May 4, 2007	Snoop Dogg (San Francisco Show)	Tom Waits
2409	May 7, 2007	Amanda Peet, Morgan Spurlock	Secondhand Serenade
Sketches include: Remembering Sweet San Francisco, Slaughter in San Francisco lever
2410	May 8, 2007	Zach Braff, D. J. Qualls, Jimmy Carr	N/A
Sketches include: Trumpet Man & Camera Lady
2411	May 9, 2007	Howie Mandel, Criss Angel	Patrick Wolf
2412	May 10, 2007	Lindsay Lohan, Larry the Cable Guy,	Stephen Marley feat. Damian "Jr. Gong" Marley
Sketches include: Instant Audience Upgrade
2413	May 11, 2007	Antonio Banderas, Sarah Chalke	The Avett Brothers
Sketches include: Crooner Ghost
2414	May 14, 2007	William Shatner, Eric Dane, mtvU's Best Music on Campus Winner	N/A
2415	May 15, 2007	Tom Selleck, John Stamos, Dan Mintz	N/A
2416	May 16, 2007	Rebecca Romijn, Donald Faison	Silversun Pickups
Sketches include: Conan Invades Matt Koman's Apartment
2417	May 17, 2007	Amy Poehler, Dave Annable	M. Ward
Sketches include: The Interrupter
2418	May 18, 2007	Luke Wilson, Oscar Nunez	Blonde Redhead
2419	May 21, 2007	Dominic Monaghan, Chris "Ludacris" Bridges	Rickie Lee Jones
2420	May 22, 2007	Amy Sedaris, Lester Holt	Loudon Wainwright III
2421	May 23, 2007	America Ferrera, Eddie Izzard, Mark "Dr. Bugs" Moffett	N/A
Sketches include: Comedy Spring Cleaning
2422	May 24, 2007	Mike Myers, Seth Rogen	The Academy Is...
2423	May 25, 2007	Dane Cook, "Dancing With the Stars" winner Apolo Anton Ohno	Mando Diao
Sketches include: Conan, Max & Joel's Big Party for American Idol Photos
2424	June 4, 2007	Paul Rudd, Elisha Cuthbert	Kings of Leon
2425	June 5, 2007	Brian Williams, Leslie Mann	Los Straitjackets with Big Sandy
2426	June 6, 2007	Debra Messing, Marc Maron	Nelly Furtado
2427	June 7, 2007	Marg Helgenberger, Steven R. Schirripa, John Mulaney	N/A
2428	June 8, 2007	Nicole Richie, Billy Connolly	Crowded House
2429	June 11, 2007	Seth Green, Eli Roth	EL-P
2430	June 12, 2007	Tim Russert, Ginnifer Goodwin	Feist
2431	June 13, 2007	Kevin Dillon, Jim Cramer	Patty Griffin
2432	June 14, 2007	Kyra Sedgwick, John Cena	Andrew Bird
2433	June 15, 2007	Jessica Alba, Bear Grylls, Paul F. Tompkins	N/A
2434	June 18, 2007	Téa Leoni, Tyrese Gibson	The White Stripes
2435	June 19, 2007	Steve Carell, Jennifer Esposito, Flight of the Conchords	N/A
2436	June 20, 2007	Wanda Sykes, Nick Offerman	Illusionist Hans Klok with Pamela Anderson
2437	June 21, 2007	John Krasinski, Louis C.K.	The Mooney Suzuki
2438	June 22, 2007	Lauren Graham, Steve Zahn	Rooney
2439	July 9, 2007	Jarod Miller, Jason Priestley, Dan Naturman	N/A
2440	July 10, 2007	Denis Leary, Mark Consuelos	Against Me!
2441	July 11, 2007	Daniel Radcliffe, Carlos Mencia	Art Brut
2442	July 12, 2007	Emma Watson, Patton Oswalt	Mark Ronson
2443	July 13, 2007	Jason Sudeikis, Janeane Garofalo	They Might Be Giants
2444	July 16, 2007	Christopher Walken, Tim Meadows	Nick Lowe
2445	July 17, 2007	Jessica Biel, Artie Lange	The Cribs
2446	July 18, 2007	Adam Sandler, Vera Farmiga	Pegi Young
2447	July 19, 2007	Queen Latifah, Matt Groening	Fountains of Wayne
2448	July 20, 2007	Kevin James, Jordana Spiro, Greg Giraldo	N/A
2449	July 30, 2007	John Leguizamo, James Blake	Marc Broussard
2450	July 31, 2007	Andy Samberg, Harry Shearer	Tegan and Sara
2451	August 1, 2007	Seth Rogen, Ann Curry, Wine critic Gary Vaynerchuk	N/A
2452	August 2, 2007	Anne Hathaway, Harland Williams	Mavis Staples
2453	August 3, 2007	Jackie Chan, Simon Pegg	Just Jack
2454	August 6, 2007	Chris Tucker, Tori Spelling	Shiny Toy Guns
2455	August 7, 2007	Glenn Close, Michael Cera	Modest Mouse
2456	August 8, 2007	Claire Danes, Jonah Hill	Teddy Thompson
Sketches include: Quackers the Duck
2457	August 9, 2007	Cuba Gooding, Jr., Jackie Hoffman, Bruce Parry	N/A
2458	August 10, 2007	Judd Apatow, Amanda Bynes	Straylight Run
2459	August 27, 2007	Bob Saget, Maggie Q	Shane Mauss
2460	August 28, 2007	Jeff Goldblum, Devon Aoki	Okkervil River
2461	August 29, 2007	Kelly Preston, Ryan Reynolds	Ozomatli
2462	August 30, 2007	Kevin Bacon, Will Forte	Eisley
2463	August 31, 2007	Scarlett Johansson, Kevin Nealon	Locksley
