= List of Late Night with Conan O'Brien episodes (season 1) =

Billy Crawford

This is a list of episodes for Season 1 of Late Night with Conan O'Brien, which aired from September 13, 1993, to September 9, 1994.

== Series overview ==
Season	Episodes	Originally aired	
Season	Episodes	First aired	Last aired
1	230	September 13, 1993	September 9, 1994
2	229	September 12, 1994	September 8, 1995
3	195	September 11, 1995	September 13, 1996
4	162	September 17, 1996	August 22, 1997
5	170	September 9, 1997	August 28, 1998
6	160	September 15, 1998	August 20, 1999
7	153	September 7, 1999	August 18, 2000
8	145	September 5, 2000	August 17, 2001
9	160	September 4, 2001	August 16, 2002
10	160	September 3, 2002	August 15, 2003
11	153	September 3, 2003	August 13, 2004
12	166	August 31, 2004	August 19, 2005
13	162	September 6, 2005	August 30, 2006
14	195	September 5, 2006	August 31, 2007
15	163	September 4, 2007	August 29, 2008
16	98	September 2, 2008	February 20, 2009

== Season 1 ==
No.	Original release date	Guest(s)	Musical/entertainment guest(s)
1	September 13, 1993	John Goodman, Drew Barrymore, Tony Randall	N/A
Sketches include: Actual items, Later with Bob Costas promo
2	September 14, 1993	Mary Tyler Moore, Chris O'Donnell	Radiohead
Sketches include: Last Night's Show, Clutch Cargo, and Audience Stories.
3	September 15, 1993	Mercedes Ruehl, Chris Connelly, Mary Matalin	N/A
Sketches include: A phone call with Ronald Reagan, Clutch Cargo with Arnold Schwarzenegger.
4	September 16, 1993	Ed McMahon, Morgan Freeman	Jonathan Richman
Sketches include: Bad Fruit Theater.
5	September 17, 1993	Adam Sandler, Dylan McDermott	Black 47
Sketches include: How Conan was hired by NBC, If They Mated, Audience Thoughts, Bob Calderwood and His Urinating Zoo Animals
6	September 20, 1993	Miss America Kimberly Clarice Aiken, Daphne Zuniga, Wade Boggs	N/A
Sketches include: Celebrity Answering Machines, a phone call with Ronald Reagan, teasing Conan's name, Audience Questions
7	September 21, 1993	Gore Vidal, Julianne Phillips	Urge Overkill
Last Night's Show, teasing Conan's name, Doug the Neighbor, Conan's Dads
8	September 22, 1993	Phil Donahue, Melissa Gilbert	N/A
Sketches include: In the Year 2000, Last Night's Show, Audience Thoughts, Interview with President Taft
9	September 23, 1993	Gaby Hoffmann, Gabriel Byrne	The Breeders
Sketches include: A phone call with Ronald Reagan
10	September 24, 1993	Halle Berry, Les Paul	Les Paul and His Trio
Sketches include: Andy's Runners-Up, Clutch Cargo with Michael Jackson, teasing Conan's name, the Hungry Old Lady, Dippy the Hippie
11	September 27, 1993	Chris Penn, David Halberstam	N/A
Sketches include: A phone call with Ronald Reagan, If They Mated, Conan joins the New York Giants, the Angry Irish Guy, Brockman's Husband of the Year
12	September 28, 1993	Martin Sheen, Joe Franklin	Sheryl Crow
Sketches include: Dressing Room Two-Way Mirror, Celebrity Head on an Animal Body
13	September 29, 1993	Bob Vila, Dawn Wells	Barenaked Ladies
14	September 30, 1993	Ron Reagan, Ellen Cleghorne	The Juliana Hatfield Three
Sketches include: Prank Calls, cracking Andy's back, teasing Conan's name, Happy New Month
15	October 1, 1993	Ricki Lake, Steven Weber	Mel Tormé
Sketches include: Critique of Last Night's Show, Doug the Neighbor, surprise guest "Bruce Springsteen"
16	October 4, 1993	Mayim Bialik, Dennis Franz, Paul Krassner	N/A
Sketches include: Clutch Cargo, Audience Thoughts, Bad Fruit Theatre
17	October 5, 1993	Eric Roberts, Eartha Kitt	Kelly Willis
Sketches include: Giving Andy his comb back, Things We Didn't Get to Make Fun Of, Doug the Neighbor, foreigners making fun of English
18	October 6, 1993	Maury Povich, Victoria Van Meter, Gerald Posner	N/A
Sketches include: Exposing Eric Roberts' martial arts skills, Fortune Cookies, Teasing Conan's Name, Celebrity Corner, Who Ate the Fudge?
19	October 7, 1993	Jeff Goldblum, Roddy McDowall	Belly
Sketches include: Actual Items, Conan's family runs the show, Beat Poem from Joe Franklin
20	October 8, 1993	Jamie Lee Curtis, Richard Linklater	The Indians
21	October 11, 1993	Mimi Rogers, Mafia Chef Joe Iannuzzi	Louis C.K.
Sketches include: William Shatner Day, Clutch Cargo, Year-Round Carolers, Celebrity Head on an Animal Body
22	October 12, 1993	Rip Torn, Steve Buscemi	Dick Dale
Sketches include: Truth or Dare, Skull Juice, Conan's unique abilities
23	October 13, 1993	Cloris Leachman, Craig Sheffer	4 Non Blondes
Sketches include: Fall colors, Celebrity Answering Machines, Conan's page crush, special effects technician, Clutch Cargo
24	October 14, 1993	Steve Allen, Tiffani Amber Thiessen	Charlie Watts
Sketches include: Testing new personas
25	October 15, 1993	Peter Gallagher, John Melendez, Alex Winter	Suede
Sketches include: In the Year 2000, Conan's page crush, Dippy the Hippie, Skull Juice
26	October 18, 1993	Chris Farley, Elisabeth Shue	Cracker
Sketches include: Right Side Wrong Side, Death Notices, Conan's page crush, Conan and Andy's lost ideas
27	October 19, 1993	Donna Mills, Eli Wallach	Norm Macdonald, Betty "The Bug Lady" Faber
Sketches include: Clutch Cargo, Celebrity Head on an Animal Body, Mark Twain's bad sayings, Alien Corner
28	October 20, 1993	Jon Stewart, Diedrich Bader, Will Shortz	Big Head Todd and the Monsters
Sketches include: See and Say, Celebrity Corner, Conan's page crush, Conan's Dance Break
29	October 21, 1993	Twiggy, David Faustino, Molly Ivins	The Max Weinberg 7
Sketches include: Fall colors, If They Mated, Teasing Conan's Name, The Joe Franklin Show
30	October 22, 1993	Tom Skerritt, Sean Astin, Sean Donohue	Tag Team
Sketches include: Clutch Cargo, Critique of Last Night's Show, Conan's page crush
31	October 25, 1993	Dan Cortese, William F. Buckley, Hank Aaron	N/A
Sketches include: Breaking the rules, playing Tom Skerritt's interview backwards, Skull Juice
32	October 26, 1993	William Shatner, Suzy Amis	They Might Be Giants
Sketches include: Fortune Cookies, Dizz
33	October 27, 1993	Chuck Jones, Edward Furlong, Laura Kightlinger	N/A
Sketches include: William Shatner creeps out Andy, Things We Didn't Get to Make Fun Of, Celebrity Head on an Animal Body, the Suspicious Townspeople
34	October 28, 1993	Spalding Gray, Louis Gossett Jr.	Buffalo Tom
Sketches include: Dressing Room Two-Way Mirror, Dizz, Bad Fruit Theatre (with Hal Linden)
35	October 29, 1993	Maureen McCormick, Gilbert Gottfried	The Cranberries
Sketches include: Clutch Cargo, a prank call from Adam Sandler, Halloween costumes (featuring Ed Koch, Anton Fig, Dick Cavett, Orville Redenbacher, and Gary Redenbacher)
36	November 1, 1993	Ed Koch	Levon Helm
Sketches include: Truth or Dare, Happy New Month
37	November 2, 1993	Jerry Stiller & Anne Meara, Martin Gross, Gwyneth Paltrow	Bettie Serveert
Sketches include: Decision '93, Mark Twain's Bad Sayings, Dizz
38	November 3, 1993	Chuck Barris, Sarah Silverman	Jamiroquai
Sketches include: Actual Items, Andy's relaxation tape, Conan's Sad Little Friend
39	November 4, 1993	Jane Pauley, Peter McWilliams	Matthew Sweet
Sketches include: Andy's Sister Katie, Last Night's Show, Later with Bob Costas promo, special effects technician, Fan Hat Submissions
40	November 5, 1993	Julia Sweeney, Rip Taylor	Jonathan Richman
Sketches include: Commercial jingles, Teasing Conan's Name, Dippy the Hippie
41	November 8, 1993	Dick Cavett, Tatjana Patitz	Johnnie Johnson & The Kentucky Headhunters
Sketches include: If They Mated, Dizz, Alien Corner
42	November 9, 1993	Corbin Bernsen, Sônia Braga, David Gail, David Adler	N/A
Sketches include: NAFTA Pro vs. Con, Dressing Room Two-Way Mirror, Celebrity Head on an Animal Body, Showbiz Corner
43	November 10, 1993	Fran Drescher, Jimmy Workman	Björk
Sketches include: Viewer Gifts, Things We Didn't Get to Make Fun Of, Celebrity Corner.
44	November 11, 1993	Morton Downey, Jr., William Safire	Straitjacket Fits
Sketches include: In the Year 2000, a prank call from Adam Sandler, Year-Round Carolers
45	November 12, 1993	Rob Schneider, Rick Schroder	Kirsty MacColl
Sketches include: Last Night on Conan O'Brien, If I Could Talk to the Audience, 1-600-FFRIDGE, a day with Doug Llewelyn (remote)
46	November 15, 1993	John Leguizamo, Wink Martindale	Graham Parker
Sketches include: Right Side Wrong Side, Doug the Neighbor, Conan's Sassy Aunt, poet Richard Black
47	November 16, 1993	Robin Leach, Tim Russert, T. Berry Brazelton	N/A
Sketches include: Andy's Marathon Update, Fortune Cookies, Audience Questions
48	November 17, 1993	Bobcat Goldthwait, Weekly World News editors Salvatore Ivone and Jack Alexander	Bad Religion
Sketches include: Andy's Marathon Update, See and Say, Audience Questions, The Joe Franklin Show
49	November 18, 1993	Tony Randall, Russ Meyer, Paula Newby-Fraser	The Afghan Whigs
Sketches include: Bumped Guest, Clutch Cargo
50	November 19, 1993	Kevin Nealon, Adam West	TBA
Sketches include: Andy's Marathon Update, Celebrity X-Rays, Clutch Cargo, Doug the Neighbor, Audience Questions, Five Nights of Laughter
51	November 22, 1993	René Auberjonois, Yokozuna & Mr. Fuji	Joe Henry
Sketches include: One of These Things (Is Not Like the Others), Where Were You When You First Made Money Off the JFK Assassination?, Polly the NBC Peacock, Dizz, Audience Questions
52	November 23, 1993	Sid Caesar, Tabitha Soren	Tom Agna
Sketches include: Critique of Last Night's Show, Polly the NBC Peacock, Death Notices
53	November 24, 1993	David Dinkins, Dustin Diamond	Béla Fleck and the Flecktones
Sketches include: If They Mated, Billy the Sad Kid.
54	November 25, 1993	Ellen Cleghorne, Alan Dershowitz	Tribe
Sketches include: Kiss-Ass Turkey, Giving Thanks, Teasing Conan's Name, Richard Black at the Macy's Thanksgiving Day Parade balloon inflation
55	November 26, 1993	Jay Thomas, Directors of The War Room	The Connells
56	November 29, 1993	Kelsey Grammer, Valerie Bertinelli	Black 47
57	November 30, 1993	Andrew Shue, Sy Sperling, Billy West	N/A
Sketches include: Happy New Month
58	December 1, 1993	Raúl Juliá, Bronson Pinchot, Werner Klemperer	N/A
59	December 2, 1993	Katie Couric, Mel Harris	Solomon Burke
Sketches include: Dog experts (played by Robert Smigel and Louis C.K.).
60	December 3, 1993	Charlton Heston, Chuck Sklar, Marc Wright	N/A
Sketches include: Dippy the Hippie, Dizz
61	December 6, 1993	Leslie Nielsen, Jay Mohr	Blur
62	December 7, 1993	Jann Wenner, Janeane Garofalo	The Ocean Blue
63	December 8, 1993	Shelley Winters, Daniel Baldwin	Ruth Brown
Sketches include: Clutch Cargo with Elke Sommer and Zsa Zsa Gabor.
64	December 9, 1993	Peter Riegert, Carol Alt, Don Martin, Todd Barry	N/A
65	December 10, 1993	Mike Myers, Nicole Eggert	Squeeze
Sketches include: Showbiz Corner
66	December 13, 1993	Michael McKean, John Starks	MC Lyte
67	December 14, 1993	Paul Sorvino, Russell Baker, Jeff Garlin	Martina McBride
Sketches include: Strip Roulette, a Phone Call from Ronald Reagan, Conan's Neighbor Doug.
68	December 15, 1993	Al Roker, Brandon Tartikoff, Roshumba	N/A
69	December 16, 1993	Christina Ricci, Tony Goldwyn, Micky Dolenz	N/A
Sketches include: The Americlan.
70	December 17, 1993	Pauly Shore, Dave Marsh	Robert Gordon
71	December 20, 1993	Gabrielle Carteris, Casey Kasem	Don Byron
Sketches include: Alien Corner.
72	December 21, 1993	Grant Shaud, Caroline McKeldin	Tony Bennett
73	December 22, 1993	Alec Baldwin, Charlie Rose	Five Blind Boys of Alabama
74	December 23, 1993	Robert Klein, Mary Beth Hurt	Eddie Lawrence
Sketches include: Kiss-Ass Turkey, Santa's Lap, Ventriloquist Dummy Choir.
75	January 3, 1994	Mark Hamill, Joe Queenan	Craig Anton
Sketches include: Andy's tan, Clutch Cargo, Teasing Conan's Name, a phone call with Ronald Reagan
76	January 4, 1994	Hannah Storm, Robert Vaughn, Richard Reeves	N/A
77	January 5, 1994	Isabella Rossellini, Dave Foley	Jonathan Richman
Sketches include: Andy's tan, Dressing Room Two-Way Mirror, Things We Didn't Get to Make Fun Of, Conan's assistant Donna
78	January 6, 1994	James Carville, Amy Brenneman	Love Jones
Sketches include: Conan and Andy promote their movies, Critique of Last Night's Show, Clutch Cargo, Lakewood
79	January 7, 1994	Larry King, Chris Elliott	Das EFX
Sketches include: The Hidden Tests, You Be the Host, Conan Babies.
80	January 10, 1994	Brooke Shields, Jules Feiffer	Morphine
Sketches include: Andy's Music Quiz, Conan's appearance in The Blue Lagoon, Conan's Family in 1971
81	January 11, 1994	Geraldine Ferraro, Peter Horton, Vinny Pazienza	N/A
82	January 12, 1994	George Hamilton, Jimmy Breslin	Arlen Roth
83	January 13, 1994	Branford Marsalis, Lisa McRee	James
84	January 14, 1994	Chris Farley, Tom Wopat	Dave Attell
85	January 17, 1994	Malcolm McDowell, Tyra Banks, Matt Lauer	N/A
86	January 18, 1994	Linda Ellerbee, Yaphet Kotto	Duane Eddy
87	January 19, 1994	Susan Lucci, Gordie Howe	Jimmie Dale Gilmore
88	January 20, 1994	Francis Ford Coppola, Florence Henderson, Ken Auletta	N/A
Sketches include: Bad Fruit Theater.
89	January 21, 1994	Kid 'n Play, Daisy Fuentes	Aimee Mann
Sketches include: Virtual Reality, Slim Organbody.
90	January 25, 1994	Julie Hagerty, Pete Hamill	Marc Maron
Sketches include: Andy's Redesigned U.S. Map, If They Mated, Dog Licking Peanut Butter Off Tom Snyder's Photo
91	January 26, 1994	Cyndi Lauper, Jeff Greenfield	Loudon Wainwright III
Sketches include: Yap Speed, Fan Hat Submissions, Dandr-Off
92	January 27, 1994	Robert Culp, Ken Auletta	David Johansen
Sketches include: Conan and Andy show support for cold New Yorkers, Emergency Guest
93	January 28, 1994	Martha Plimpton, Gregory Harrison	Yo La Tengo
Sketches include: Kiss-Ass Turkey, Andy at Super Bowl XXVIII (remote), Conan's Sad Little Friend
94	January 31, 1994	Scott Baio, Veronica Webb	Taj Mahal
95	February 1, 1994	Helen Hunt, James L. Brooks	Tommy Keene
Sketches include: Finishing Andy's crossword, Lever of Tragedy
96	February 2, 1994	Paul Reiser, Scott Thompson, Kristi Yamaguchi	N/A
Sketches include: Right Side, Wrong Side; Thin, Thin Ice (with Scott Thompson as Tonya Harding)
97	February 3, 1994	James Washington, Andrew Dice Clay	Jimmy Rogers
Sketches include: Clutch Cargo, Yap Speed, Pit's OK!
98	February 4, 1994	Mario Van Peebles, Angie Everhart	Goo Goo Dolls
Sketches include: The Streaker, In the Year 2000, Conan's cut scene from I'll Do Anything, Conan Babies
99	February 7, 1994	Norman Lear, Katherine Heigl	Gene Pompa
Sketches include: Polly the Peacock, Bleep the Audience.
100	February 8, 1994	Christie Brinkley, Dereck and Beverly Joubert	Barenaked Ladies
Sketches include: Clutch Cargo.
101	February 9, 1994	Blair Brown, Peter Travers	BeauSoleil
Sketches include: The Band Show.
102	February 10, 1994	Curtis Sliwa, Andrea Mitchell	Asleep at the Wheel
Sketches include: Clutch Cargo; Lakewood.
103	February 11, 1994	Rob Schneider, Tim Daly, Bob Geary	N/A
104	February 14, 1994	Dick Clark, Marisa Berenson	Teenage Fanclub
105	February 15, 1994	Stefanie Powers & Robert Wagner, Stephen Baldwin	N/A
Sketches include: Andy at Mardi Gras (remote).
106	February 16, 1994	Jennifer Tilly, Janeane Garofalo	Swinging Steaks
Sketches include: The Americlan.
107	February 17, 1994	Ice-T, Amanda Pays, David Cross	N/A
108	February 18, 1994	Bob Dole, Tisha Campbell	Possum Dixon
Sketches include: Last Night's Show, The Streaker, Punch Conan in the Stomach Contest, Dizz.
109	February 21, 1994	Michael Madsen, James Wilder	Uncle Tupelo
Sketches include: Clutch Cargo.
110	February 22, 1994	Al Franken, Buddy Ebsen	Nick Heyward
111	February 23, 1994	Dick Cavett, Dorian Harewood	Hank Flamingo
112	February 24, 1994	Tom Brokaw, Ann Magnuson	Michael Damian
113	February 25, 1994	Ben Stiller, Peri Gilpin	Fishbone
114	February 28, 1994	David Letterman, Dweezil Zappa & Ahmet Zappa	N/A
Sketches include: If They Mated, You Be the Host, The Streaker, Billy the Sad Kid.
115	March 1, 1994	Kevin Pollak, Donny Osmond	Cowboy Junkies
116	March 2, 1994	Olivia d'Abo, John Strausbaugh	Tony! Toni! Toné!
Sketches include: Andy Crashes a Grammy Party (remote); Clutch Cargo.
117	March 3, 1994	John Larroquette, Henry Alford	NRBQ
Sketches include: Actual Items; The Streaker; Baby Debates.
118	March 4, 1994	Dweezil Zappa & Ahmet Zappa, George Kennedy	Tom Kenny
119	March 7, 1994	Andie MacDowell, Jeff Garlin	David Wilcox
120	March 8, 1994	Jerry Orbach, Camille Paglia	Matt Graham
Sketches include: Clutch Cargo with Frank Sinatra; a phone call with Ronald Reagan.
121	March 9, 1994	Stone Phillips, Kathy Ireland	David Broza
Sketches include: Photo Slideshow; Sir Harding & Dr. Alpha.
122	March 10, 1994	Phil Hartman, Tom Felice	Monty Hoffman
123	March 11, 1994	Ed Begley, Jr., Tommy Davidson	Nils Lofgren
Sketches include: Baby Debates; Dippy the Hippy.
124	March 14, 1994	David Spade, Nancy Glass	The Greenberry Woods
Sketches include: Celebrity X-Rays, The Band Show.
125	March 15, 1994	Brian Austin Green, Mary Lou Retton	The Skatalites
126	March 16, 1994	Hulk Hogan, George Plimpton	Green Day
Sketches include: Last Night's Show.
127	March 17, 1994	Jay Thomas, Barbara Eden	The Lemonheads
Sketches include: Andy at the St. Patrick's Day Parade
128	March 18, 1994	Robert Pastorelli, Patti Davis, Marlon Wayans	N/A
129	March 21, 1994	Montel Williams, Alexandra Wentworth	Dana Gould
130	March 22, 1994	Ellen Cleghorne, Robert Conrad	Jawbox
131	March 23, 1994	Alan Rachins, Nick Turturro, Richard Marcinko	N/A
Sketches include: The Galvamoven Brothers.
132	March 24, 1994	Eric Bogosian, Rich Hall	Grant Lee Buffalo
Sketches include: Dancing Panda.
133	March 25, 1994	María Conchita Alonso, Chad McQueen	Texas
Sketches include: Easter Bunny.
134	April 4, 1994	Bebe Neuwirth, Edwin Newman	Princess Tenko
135	April 5, 1994	Edward James Olmos, Harvey Korman	Crash Test Dummies
Sketches include: The Nicknamer (played by Bob Odenkirk).
136	April 6, 1994	Jackie Mason, Joel Murray	John Sebastian
Sketches include: Audience Thoughts.
137	April 7, 1994	Carrie Fisher, Victor Garber	Sheryl Crow
Sketches include: Conan Fans.
138	April 8, 1994	John Leguizamo, Phylicia Rashād	October Project
139	April 11, 1994	F. Murray Abraham, John Lydon	Allman Brothers
Sketches include: Disposa Rugs.
140	April 12, 1994	Judith Light, Matty Simmons	Koko Taylor
Sketches include: Confiscated Items; Pascal the Ant.
141	April 13, 1994	Michael Caine, Ron Howard	N/A
142	April 14, 1994	Elizabeth McGovern, Alex Rocco	Holly Cole Trio
Sketches include: Emergency Guest.
143	April 15, 1994	John Waters, Nicollette Sheridan	Rollins Band
Sketches include: Clutch Cargo; Lakewood.
144	April 18, 1994	Don King, David Remnick	BOP (harvey)
Sketches include: Sir Harding & Dr. Alpha.
145	April 19, 1994	Tasha, Mike Lupica	Meat Puppets
146	April 20, 1994	Keith Carradine, Carol Channing	The Charlatans
Sketches include: Last Night's Show; Conan's Place
147	April 21, 1994	Pam Dawber, Dixie Carter	Kevin Brennan
148	April 22, 1994	Ed Koch, Matty Rich	Kristin Hersh
149	April 25, 1994	Kenny Rogers, Moira Kelly	Richard Thompson
Sketches include: Conan's Big Deal.
150	April 26, 1994	Karen Duffy, Peter Fonda	The Golden Palominos
Sketches include: Names in the Phone Book, Yap Speed, Lever of Tragedy.
151	April 27, 1994	Amy Irving, William Kunstler	Buffalo Tom
Sketches include: Staring Contest.
152	April 28, 1994	Josie Bissett, Michael Kinsley	Junior Brown
153	April 29, 1994	Katey Sagal, Kevin Dillon	A. Whitney Brown
154	May 2, 1994	Joey Lawrence, Shelley Duvall	Brian Kiley
Sketches include: Actual Items, a phone call with Ronald Reagan.
155	May 3, 1994	Roy Scheider, Anka Radakovich	Spinanes
Sketches include: If They Were a Cyclops, Last Night's Show, Cute Animal Theater.
156	May 4, 1994	Jacqueline Bisset, Matt Salinger	Shaver
157	May 5, 1994	David Hyde Pierce, Pedro Almodóvar	Stomp
Sketches include: Continuity Errors, Polly the NBC Peacock, Ventriloquist Dummy Choir.
158	May 6, 1994	John Goodman, Rob Lowe	Shonen Knife
Sketches include: A Green Screen Walk Through New York, Slim Organbody.
159	May 9, 1994	Kim Coles, Melanie Hutsell	Dig
160	May 10, 1994	Fran Drescher, Allen Ginsberg	N/A
Sketches include: Viewer Mail.
161	May 11, 1994	Mary Stuart Masterson, Gay Talese	The Smithereens
Sketches include: What in the World.
162	May 12, 1994	George Wendt, Jack Ford	Indigo Girls
163	May 13, 1994	Geraldo Rivera, Chris Noth	Louis C.K.
Sketches include: Conan Babies.
164	May 16, 1994	Andrew Shue, Dr. Joyce Brothers	Steel Pulse
Sketches include: Instant TV Movie, Chinese Lenny Bruce.
165	May 17, 1994	Julia Sweeney, Michael Chiklis	Jonathan Richman
Sketches include: Andy Goes to a Dangerous Bar (remote).
166	May 18, 1994	Jay Leno, Zelda Harris, Caleb Carr	N/A
167	May 19, 1994	James Coburn, John Melendez	Marshall Crenshaw
Sketches include: Cute Animal Theater.
168	May 20, 1994	Farrah Fawcett, Ed Asner	Brian McCann
169	May 24, 1994	Mike Lupica, Alan Shepard	Frente
Sketches include: The Americlan.
170	May 25, 1994	Thomas Calabro, Ann Miller	Sam Phillips
Sketches include: Baby Debates.
171	May 26, 1994	Gilbert Gottfried, Jamie Farr	The Radiators
Sketches include: Trapped in a Meat Locker.
172	May 27, 1994	Penny Marshall, Gaby Hoffmann	Harland Williams
Sketches include: A Show from Queens (remote).
173	June 7, 1994	Bill Walton, Paul Rudnick	Barry Clifford
Sketches include: Lever of Tragedy.
174	June 8, 1994	Kid n' Play, Ben & Jerry	Tori Amos
175	June 9, 1994	Victoria Jackson, Bill Tonelli	Eleven
Sketches include: A phone call with Ronald Reagan.
176	June 10, 1994	John Lithgow, Dr. Ruth Westheimer	A Tribe Called Quest
Sketches include: Actual Items, Pascal the Ant, Stay in Your Seat Theatre.
177	June 13, 1994	Linda Blair, Helen Thomas	Spanic Boys
Sketches include: Andy Goes to the Tonys (remote).
178	June 14, 1994	Billy Dee Williams, Caleb Carr	Mike Sweeney
179	June 15, 1994	Ed McMahon, Cathy Moriarty, Terry Murphy	N/A
180	June 16, 1994	Brian Leetch, Chris Rock	Frank Black
Sketches include: Emergency Guest.
181	June 17, 1994	Dweezil & Ahmet Zappa, Frederique van der Wal	G. Love & Special Sauce
182	June 20, 1994	Harry Shearer, Don Pardo	The Story
Sketches include: Andy Richter at the NBA Finals (remote).
183	June 21, 1994	Spalding Gray, Colin Quinn	Blue Rodeo
184	June 22, 1994	Beverly Johnson, Dominick Dunne, Rebecca Pidgeon	N/A
185	June 23, 1994	James McDaniel, Paul Begala	Sleepy LaBeef
186	June 24, 1994	David Cassidy, Eric Schaeffer & Donal Lardner Ward	Tom Agna
187	July 5, 1994	Bill Bellamy, Lisa Kudrow, David Goldsmith	N/A
188	July 6, 1994	Leila Kenzle, Kim Coles	Al Kooper
189	July 7, 1994	Yaphet Kotto, Jack Noseworthy	Tripping Daisy
190	July 8, 1994	Kim Coles, Anka Radakovich	Superchunk
191	July 11, 1994	Tony Meola, Mark Leyner	Dr. John
192	July 12, 1994	Dr. Dre & Ed Lover, Ron Popeil	Andy Kindler
193	July 13, 1994	Harry Connick, Jr., David Sedaris	Sarah McLachlan
194	July 14, 1994	Cybill Shepherd, Lina Wertmüller	N/A
195	July 15, 1994	Mike Judge, Julie Walters	Velvet Crush
Sketches include: Conan Babies.
196	July 18, 1994	Nathan Lane, Peggy Noonan	Warren Thomas
197	July 19, 1994	Phil Simms, Jenny Brunt	Lisa Germano
198	July 20, 1994	Gary Sinise, Lisa Sliwa	Freedy Johnston
Sketches include: Anniversary of the Moon Landing.
199	July 21, 1994	Tom Arnold, Deidre Hall	Jimmy Webb
Sketches include: Chinese Lenny Bruce.
200	July 22, 1994	Janeane Garofalo, Anthony LaPaglia	Jackopierce
201	July 25, 1994	Robin Leach, Lynne Russell	Lush
202	July 26, 1994	Leeza Gibbons, Abe Vigoda	John Hiatt
203	July 27, 1994	Michael Moore, Isaac Hayes	Louie Bellson
204	July 28, 1994	Paulina Porizkova, Whit Stillman	Us3
205	July 29, 1994	Ellen Cleghorne, Jenny McCarthy	Brian Regan
Sketches include: Video Challenge, Monday's Show, Slim Organbody.
206	August 1, 1994	Don King, Masoud Karkehabadi	Hugh Fink
Sketches include: Old Man July & Baby August.
207	August 2, 1994	Jackie Mason, Bret Easton Ellis	Bruce Cockburn
Sketches include: Clutch Cargo, Pascal the Ant, Pucky Littlechap.
208	August 3, 1994	Dave Foley, Jeremy Davies, Tommy Bond	N/A
Sketches include: Easter Bunny.
209	August 4, 1994	Cameron Diaz, Jack Ford	Love Spit Love
210	August 5, 1994	Harry Shearer, Karen Duffy	Jeffrey Gaines
211	August 8, 1994	Dick Cavett, Denny Dillon	Roger McGuinn
Sketches include: Who Would Win?, Viewer Letters, The People's Scientist.
212	August 9, 1994	Thea Vidale, Pat Morita	Nick Cave and the Bad Seeds
213	August 10, 1994	Scott Thompson, Dr. Joyce Brothers	Brian McCann
Sketches include: Art Critique, Celebrity Corner.
214	August 11, 1994	Gilbert Gottfried, Mike Lupica	The Vacant Lot
215	August 12, 1994	La Toya Jackson, Stuttering John	N/A
Sketches include: Cute Animal Theater.
216	August 15, 1994	Mary Matalin, Ray Romano, Nathan Cavaleri	N/A
Sketches include: Andy at Woodstock (remote), College Band Search Losers.
217	August 16, 1994	Richard Benjamin, Milla Jovovich	N/A
Sketches include: Baseball Strike Update, Last Friday's Show, College Band Search Losers.
218	August 17, 1994	Julie Brown, Missy Giove, David Cross	N/A
219	August 18, 1994	Michael Moore, Boyd Matson	Gigolo Aunts
220	August 19, 1994	Gail O'Grady, Rubén Blades	Blightobody
221	August 22, 1994	Zsa Zsa Gabor, Chris Eigeman	Mikal Gilmore
222	August 23, 1994	Carol Shaya, D. B. Sweeney	Mazzy Star
223	August 24, 1994	Jane Pauley, Nick Bakay	Barenaked Ladies
224	August 25, 1994	Paula Zahn, Adam West	Weezer
225	August 26, 1994	David Alan Grier, Tracy Austin	Dom Irrera
Sketches include: A Walk in Central Park.
226	September 5, 1994	Paul Sorvino, Jeff Garlin	Reggie McFadden
Sketches include: The Jerry Lewis Telethon.
227	September 6, 1994	Hannah Storm, Giancarlo Esposito	Marianne Faithfull
228	September 7, 1994	Montel Williams, The Jensens	Jonathan Richman
229	September 8, 1994	Fran Drescher, Suzanne Somers	The Mavericks
230	September 9, 1994	Judith Light, Al Roker	Warren G
Sketches include: Andy at VMAs (remote); Turbo Ninjas and White Stockings.
