= List of Late Night with Conan O'Brien episodes (season 5) =

This is a list of episodes for Season 5 of Late Night with Conan O'Brien, which aired from September 9, 1997, to August 28, 1998.

== Series overview ==
Season	Episodes	Originally aired	
Season	Episodes	First aired	Last aired
1	230	September 13, 1993	September 9, 1994
2	229	September 12, 1994	September 8, 1995
3	195	September 11, 1995	September 13, 1996
4	162	September 17, 1996	August 22, 1997
5	170	September 9, 1997	August 28, 1998
6	160	September 15, 1998	August 20, 1999
7	153	September 7, 1999	August 18, 2000
8	145	September 5, 2000	August 17, 2001
9	160	September 4, 2001	August 16, 2002
10	160	September 3, 2002	August 15, 2003
11	153	September 3, 2003	August 13, 2004
12	166	August 31, 2004	August 19, 2005
13	162	September 6, 2005	August 30, 2006
14	195	September 5, 2006	August 31, 2007
15	163	September 4, 2007	August 29, 2008
16	98	September 2, 2008	February 20, 2009

== Season 5 ==
No.	Original release date	Guest(s)	Musical/entertainment guest(s)
816	September 9, 1997	Chris Rock, Michael Moore	Neal Coty
817	September 10, 1997	Robert Wuhl, Adam Sandler	N/A
818	September 11, 1997	Michael Palin, Tommy Lasorda	Cyndi Lauper
819	September 16, 1997	Kirk Douglas, Gabrielle Reece	James Taylor
820	September 17, 1997	Kevin Nealon, Yasmine Bleeth	Jud Hale
821	September 18, 1997	Lucy Lawless, David Cross & Bob Odenkirk	Ani DiFranco
822	September 19, 1997	Richard Lewis, Leila Kenzle	Nanci Griffith & The Crickets
823	September 23, 1997	Matt Dillon, Jaleel White	Jon Bon Jovi
824	September 24, 1997	Tom Arnold, Melissa Joan Hart	Robert Hawkins
825	September 25, 1997	Elton John, Tim Meadows	N/A
826	September 26, 1997	Joan Cusack, John Tesh	Squirrel Nut Zippers
827	September 30, 1997	Fran Drescher, Nikki Cox	Paul Rodriguez
828	October 1, 1997	Jon Lovitz, Kate Capshaw	Our Lady Peace
829	October 2, 1997	Jim Breuer, Guy Pearce	Mark Straussman
830	October 3, 1997	Tony Randall, Kimberly Williams	Sister Hazel
831	October 7, 1997	Russell Crowe, Joan Collins	Big Sandy & His Fly-Rite Boys
832	October 8, 1997	Paul Reiser, Janeane Garofalo	Steve Winwood
833	October 9, 1997	John Lithgow, Dave Chappelle	Paul F. Tompkins
834	October 10, 1997	John Larroquette, Thane Maynard	N/A
835	October 14, 1997	David Duchovny, Bill Bellamy	Robert Bradley's Blackwater Surprise
836	October 15, 1997	Penn & Teller, Jill Hennessy	Powerman 5000
837	October 16, 1997	Tori Spelling, Ice-T, Evel Knievel	N/A
838	October 17, 1997	Robert Pastorelli, Charlize Theron	N/A
839	October 28, 1997	John Leguizamo, Laura San Giacomo	Texas
840	October 29, 1997	Martha Stewart, Jimeoin	N/A
841	October 30, 1997	Ethan Hawke, Kennedy	Jimmy Blaylock
842	October 31, 1997	David Hyde Pierce, Fred Savage	Cannabis
843	November 4, 1997	Molly Ringwald, Mia Kirshner	Lewis Black
844	November 5, 1997	Cybill Shepherd, Helena Bonham Carter	Royal Crown Revue
845	November 6, 1997	William Shatner, George Stephanopoulos, French Stewart	N/A
846	November 7, 1997	Rudy Giuliani, Karl Malden	Phish
847	November 11, 1997	Bryant Gumbel, Francis Ford Coppola	Green Day
848	November 12, 1997	Matt Lauer, Lisa Rinna, James Ellroy	N/A
849	November 13, 1997	Ving Rhames, Peter Gallagher	Reggie McFadden
850	November 14, 1997	Bill Murray, Ally Walker	Patti Smith
851	November 18, 1997	Sam Donaldson & Cokie Roberts	Jackson Browne
852	November 19, 1997	Denis Leary, Marcia Gay Harden	Frank Santorelli
853	November 20, 1997	George Wendt, Julie Foudy, Terry Jones	N/A
854	November 21, 1997	Darrell Hammond, Sheryl Crow	N/A
855	November 25, 1997	Sigourney Weaver, Frank Gorshin	Garth Brooks
856	November 26, 1997	Nathan Lane, Al Sharpton	Todd Rundgren
857	November 27, 1997	Scott Thompson, Carol Leifer	Dana Gould
858	November 28, 1997	Mary Tyler Moore, Anthony Clark	Ric Ocasek
859	December 9, 1997	Courteney Cox, Chris Kattan	Matthew Ryan
860	December 10, 1997	Donald Trump, Marc Maron, Dan Dye & Mark Beckloff	N/A
861	December 11, 1997	Helen Hunt, Fisher Stevens	Todd Barry
862	December 12, 1997	Danny Aiello, Joyce Brothers, Imani Coppola	N/A
863	December 16, 1997	Tom Brokaw, Jerry O'Connell	Los Straitjackets
864	December 17, 1997	Quentin Tarantino, Naseem Hamed, Mike Lupica	N/A
865	December 18, 1997	Al Roker, Kelly Lynch	Tony Bennett
866	December 19, 1997	Thane Maynard, Colin Quinn	Southern Culture on the Skids
867	December 22, 1997	Ozzy Osbourne, Rich Hall	Ricky Skaggs
868	December 23, 1997	Janeane Garofalo, Lewis Black	Cecelia Thomson
869	December 26, 1997	Jay Mohr, Timothy Olyphant	Janine Ditullio
870	December 29, 1997	Dweezil & Ahmet Zappa, Tito Puente	N/A
871	December 30, 1997	Molly Shannon, Dave Attell	Diana Krall
872	January 1, 1998	Pam Grier, Keith Olbermann	Andy Kindler
873	January 2, 1998	Nicholas Turturro, Joey Lauren Adams	Marcy Playground
874	January 6, 1998	Willard Scott, Michael Rapaport	N/A
875	January 7, 1998	Rob Schneider, Ed Koch	Cornershop
876	January 8, 1998	Samuel L. Jackson, Robert Young Pelton	Nick DiPaolo
877	January 9, 1998	Minnie Driver, Richard Belzer	B. B. King
878	January 20, 1998	Ted Williams, Dave Chappelle	N/A
879	January 21, 1998	Martin Scorsese, Maria Bartiromo	Martina McBride
880	January 22, 1998	Jim Breuer, Bruce Strauss	Jimmy Tingle
881	January 23, 1998	Rose McGowan	Huffamoose
882	January 27, 1998	Richard Kind, Matthew Lillard	Patton Oswalt
883	January 28, 1998	Famke Janssen, Bill Nye	The Pat McGuire Band
884	January 29, 1998	Michael Keaton, Denver Broncos Offensive Line, Angelina Jolie	N/A
885	January 30, 1998	Ben Stiller, Dan Cortese	Domo
886	February 3, 1998	Jerry Springer, Melinda Clarke, David Brenner	N/A
887	February 4, 1998	John Leguizamo, Ed McMahon	Victoria Williams
888	February 5, 1998	Dan Aykroyd, Rebecca Romijn	N/A
889	February 6, 1998	John Goodman, Dikembe Mutombo	Steve Earle
890	February 10, 1998	Roma Downey, Shannon Hall	Warren Hutcherson
891	February 11, 1998	Bob Costas, Louis C.K.	Salt-N-Pepa
892	February 12, 1998	John Tesh, Darrell Hammond	Matt Kingfield
893	February 13, 1998	Adam Sandler, Marlon Wayans	Kenny Wayne Shepherd
894	February 17, 1998	Tom Selleck, Ana Gasteyer	Alana Davis
895	February 18, 1998	Ricki Lake, David Breashears	Allan Havey
896	February 19, 1998	Rob Schneider, Tim Russert, Allen Covert	N/A
897	February 20, 1998	Jason Priestley, Billy Zane	Hepcat
898	February 24, 1998	Matthew Modine, Roy Jones Jr.	Patty Loveless
899	February 25, 1998	Robert Duvall, Bill Bellamy, Samuel Folson	N/A
900	February 26, 1998	Jane Seymour, Will Ferrell	Hanson
901	February 27, 1998	David Schwimmer, Kurt Loder	Ed Byrne
902	March 3, 1998	John Malkovich, Craig T. Nelson	H. Keith Melton
903	March 4, 1998	Kathleen Turner, Marc Maron	Elliott Smith
904	March 5, 1998	Scott Wolf, Flea	Kevin Brennan
905	March 6, 1998	Frederique, Boyd Matson	Finley Quaye
906	March 10, 1998	Tom Arnold, Elizabeth Berkley	Chantal Kreviazuk
907	March 11, 1998	Rudy Giuliani, David Frost	Jeff Garlin
908	March 12, 1998	Fred Savage, Billy the Runaway Dog	Ian Bagg
909	March 13, 1998	Denis Leary, Holly Robinson	Mary Lou Lord
910	March 17, 1998	Peter Fonda, Colin Quinn	Blink-182
911	March 18, 1998	Kevin Bacon, Andy Kindler	The Bacon Brothers
912	March 19, 1998	Julianna Margulies	Lewis Black
913	March 20, 1998	Tim Robbins, Lauren Holly, Doris Wishman	N/A
914	March 31, 1998	Ice-T, Ricky Jay	The Mavericks
915	April 1, 1998	Edward Burns, Lennox Lewis	Dana Gould
916	April 2, 1998	Steve Buscemi, Mimi Rogers	N/A
917	April 3, 1998	Al Franken, Veronica Webb	Big Bad Voodoo Daddy
918	April 7, 1998	Matt LeBlanc, Christina Applegate	Semisonic
919	April 8, 1998	Steven Wright, Cheech Marin, Jonathan Harris	N/A
920	April 9, 1998	Yogi Berra, Vendela	Hugh Fink
921	April 10, 1998	Tom Brokaw, Michael Moore	Ben Harper
922	April 14, 1998	Patricia Arquette, Bob Hoskins	Mono
923	April 15, 1998	William Shatner, Kathy Griffin	Lionel Hampton
924	April 16, 1998	Thane Maynard, Isaac Hayes	Bobby Slayton
925	April 17, 1998	Corbin Bernsen, Rya Kihlstedt	Ken Rogerson
926	April 21, 1998	Gwyneth Paltrow, Tom Snyder	Fastball
927	April 22, 1998	Richard Lewis, Rob Morrow	JB Ben
928	April 23, 1998	Regis Philbin, Paige Turco	Ukrainian National Dance Co.
929	April 24, 1998	Isabella Rossellini, Jerry O'Connell	The Derailers
930	April 28, 1998	John Lithgow, Marc Maron	Pete Seeger & Dar Williams
931	April 29, 1998	Al Roker, Peter Berg	Jason & the Scorchers
932	April 30, 1998	Mark Wahlberg, Chris Kattan	Jeff Stilson
933	May 1, 1998	Patrick Swayze, Daniela Peštová	N/A
Note: Michael Wood was scheduled to appear, but was cut due to time constraints.
934	May 5, 1998	Michael J. Fox, Dave Foley	N/A
935	May 6, 1998	Teri Hatcher, Oliver Platt	Lisa Loeb & Dweezil Zappa
936	May 7, 1998	David Hasselhoff, Molly Shannon	Morcheeba
937	May 8, 1998	Nicholas Turturro, Spike Lee	Michael Stipe
938	May 12, 1998	Fran Drescher, Joe Rogan	Ray Davies
939	May 13, 1998	Halle Berry, Robert Urich	Todd Snider
940	May 14, 1998	Rosie O'Donnell, Patrick Warburton	Dave Attell
941	May 15, 1998	Barbara Walters, Maria Pitillo	Betty "The Bug Lady" Faber
942	May 19, 1998	Gena Lee Nolin, Scott Thompson	Link Wray
943	May 20, 1998	Fabio Lanzoni, Vicki Lewis	The Deftones
944	May 21, 1998	Matthew Broderick, Helen Martin	Emeril Lagasse
945	May 22, 1998	Chevy Chase, Courtney Thorne-Smith	Andy Kindler
946	June 9, 1998	Janeane Garofalo, Louis C.K.	Save Ferris
947	June 10, 1998	Anne Heche, Robert Stack	Ed Byrne
948	June 11, 1998	Sarah Jessica Parker, Darrell Hammond	N/A
949	June 12, 1998	Dave Chappelle, Laura Linney	Pulp
950	June 16, 1998	Hank Azaria, Patrick Macnee	Shane MacGowan
951	June 17, 1998	Charles Grodin, Marc Maron	Ebba Forsberg
952	June 18, 1998	Michael Rapaport, Jonathan Katz	Bran Van 3000
953	June 19, 1998	Marilu Henner, Greg Fitzsimmons	David George Gordon
954	June 23, 1998	Sarah Michelle Gellar, Caroline Rhea	Brian Regan
955	June 24, 1998	Billy Bob Thornton, Rebecca Lobo	Fuel
956	June 25, 1998	Clyde Peeling, Connie Britton	N/A
957	June 26, 1998	Ray Romano, Christina Ricci	Girls Against Boys
958	July 7, 1998	Rich Hall, Kristen Johnston	Jimmie Vaughan
959	July 8, 1998	Jim Breuer, Doris Kearns Goodwin	Todd Barry
960	July 9, 1998	Alexi Lalas, Steve Zahn	Brady Barr
961	July 10, 1998	Chris Rock, Judith Martin	Lucinda Williams
962	July 14, 1998	Alan Alda, Ana Gasteyer, Chris Eigeman	N/A
963	July 15, 1998	Ben Stiller, Seth Green	Brian Setzer Orchestra
964	July 16, 1998	Matt Dillon, Jake Johannsen	Ben Folds Five
965	July 17, 1998	Chris Elliott, Larry Holmes, Joey Green	N/A
966	July 21, 1998	Joy Behar, Wallace Langham	Eve 6
967	July 22, 1998	Jay Mohr, Brandy	BR549
968	July 23, 1998	Peter Jennings, Dave Wells	Paul F. Tompkins
969	July 24, 1998	Edward Burns, Louis C.K.	Bob McCoy
970	August 4, 1998	Jamie Lee Curtis, Dana Gould	Widespread Panic
971	August 5, 1998	Tony Danza, Joseph Gordon-Levitt	Patrice O'Neal
972	August 6, 1998	French Stewart, Jeff Greenfield	Monster Magnet
973	August 7, 1998	Adam Arkin, Jim Fowler	Tori Amos
974	August 11, 1998	Gary Sinise, LL Cool J	Jonathan Richman
975	August 12, 1998	Jimmy Buffett, Carla Gugino	Dwayne Kennedy
976	August 13, 1998	Ray Liotta, Richard Kind	Upright Citizens Brigade
977	August 14, 1998	Anne Heche, Mills Lane	Catatonia
978	August 18, 1998	Don Rickles, Traci Lords	Emmylou Harris
979	August 19, 1998	Al Roker, Darrell Hammond	Rufus Wainwright
980	August 20, 1998	Vanessa L. Williams, Al Franken	David Feldman
981	August 21, 1998	Colin Quinn, Alexander Chaplin	Angela Amato
982	August 25, 1998	Pam Grier, Bill Bellamy	Sprung Monkey
983	August 26, 1998	Tommy Davidson, Amy Brenneman	Mike Lupica
984	August 27, 1998	Salma Hayek, Richard Branson	The Dixie Chicks
985	August 28, 1998	Brian Williams, Frank McCourt	Lewis Black
