= List of Late Night with Conan O'Brien episodes (season 2) =

This is a list of episodes for Season 2 of Late Night with Conan O'Brien, which aired from September 13, 1994, to September 8, 1995.

== Series overview ==
Season	Episodes	Originally aired	
Season	Episodes	First aired	Last aired
1	230	September 13, 1993	September 9, 1994
2	229	September 12, 1994	September 8, 1995
3	195	September 11, 1995	September 13, 1996
4	162	September 17, 1996	August 22, 1997
5	170	September 9, 1997	August 28, 1998
6	160	September 15, 1998	August 20, 1999
7	153	September 7, 1999	August 18, 2000
8	145	September 5, 2000	August 17, 2001
9	160	September 4, 2001	August 16, 2002
10	160	September 3, 2002	August 15, 2003
11	153	September 3, 2003	August 13, 2004
12	166	August 31, 2004	August 19, 2005
13	162	September 6, 2005	August 30, 2006
14	195	September 5, 2006	August 31, 2007
15	163	September 4, 2007	August 29, 2008
16	98	September 2, 2008	February 20, 2009

== Season 2 ==
No.	Original release date	Guest(s)	Musical/entertainment guest(s)
231	September 12, 1994	Dweezil & Ahmet Zappa, Anka Radakovich, Harland Williams	N/A
Sketches include: Baby Debates.
232	September 13, 1994	Meg Tilly, Joe Torry, Jud Hale	N/A
233	September 14, 1994	Martin Sheen, Yasmine Bleeth	Dave Edmunds
234	September 15, 1994	Dennis Rodman, Eve Plumb	The Subdudes
235	September 16, 1994	Don Novello, Jackie Collins	Des'ree
Sketches include: Desk Drive, Last Night's Show.
236	September 19, 1994	Charlie Sheen, Melissa Gilbert	N/A
237	September 20, 1994	Kenny Rogers, Gloria Reuben	Collective Soul
238	September 21, 1994	Mary Tyler Moore, Jay Mohr	Dick Dale
239	September 22, 1994	David Brenner, Kellie Martin	Seed (band)
Sketches include: Polly the NBC Peacock.
240	September 23, 1994	Kevin Nealon, Leonard Maltin, Kermit the Frog	N/A
241	September 26, 1994	Brian Austin Green & Tiffani Amber Thiessen, Alison Stewart	Chuck Sklar
Sketches include: Art Critique.
242	September 27, 1994	Gordon Elliott, Joely Fisher	The Dambuilders
243	September 28, 1994	Stone Phillips, Tim Green	Pops Staples
244	September 29, 1994	Janeane Garofalo, Anthony Edwards	Dana Gould
245	September 30, 1994	Brian Dennehy, Veronica Webb	Cracker
Sketches include: Please Send Cookie, Demographic Minute, Dubbed Classics.
246	October 3, 1994	Michael McKean, Peter Guralnick, Ann B. Davis	N/A
247	October 4, 1994	Harry Smith, Herbert Stempel	The Judybats
248	October 5, 1994	Rita Moreno, Bill Lee	Violent Femmes
249	October 6, 1994	Bonnie Hunt, Chuck Barris	Ron Lynch
250	October 7, 1994	Roshumba, Matt Groening	Jimmie Vaughan
251	October 10, 1994	Kennedy, Mia Sara	Gods Child
252	October 11, 1994	Daniel Baldwin, Merrill Markoe	Colin James
253	October 12, 1994	Sandra Bernhard, Wes Craven	N/A
254	October 13, 1994	Scott Thompson, Chris Matthews	N/A
255	October 14, 1994	Chuck Woolery, David Paymer, David Greenberger	N/A
256	October 17, 1994	Robert Klein, Nancy Kerrigan	Bloodline
Sketches include: A visit to Sun Studio (remote).
257	October 18, 1994	Terry Jones, Brian Benben, Jack Micheline	N/A
258	October 19, 1994	Greg Gumbel, Wallace Shawn, Sheree J. Wilson	N/A
259	October 20, 1994	Dana Carvey, David Faustino	Victoria Williams
Sketches include: On the Aisle.
260	October 21, 1994	Tom Snyder, Camille Paglia	Sebadoh
261	October 31, 1994	Robert Englund, pumpkin carvers	They Might Be Giants
Sketches include: Clutch Cargo, Pumpkin Alternatives.
262	November 1, 1994	Peri Gilpin, George Takei	N/A
Sketches include: Kids' Drawings, Old Man October, Tomorry the Ostrich.
263	November 2, 1994	Timothy Dalton, Rich Hall, Maureen McCormick	N/A
Sketches include: International Peekaboo Finals, In the Year 2000.
264	November 3, 1994	George Wendt, Ed Koch	David Broza
Sketches include: If They Mated.
265	November 4, 1994	Lily Tomlin, Tabitha Soren	Black 47
Sketches include: Conan Babies.
266	November 7, 1994	Janeane Garofalo, Chad Allen, John Ridley	N/A
Sketches include: Sidekick Debate.
267	November 8, 1994	Leslie Nielsen, Kathy Ireland	Paula Cole
Sketches include: Election Returns.
268	November 9, 1994	Frank Gifford, Anka Radakovich	Pam Tillis
269	November 10, 1994	Mike Myers, Tawny Kitaen	The Proclaimers
Sketches include: Andy at Star Search (remote), Clutch Cargo.
270	November 11, 1994	Sarah Jessica Parker, Richard Belzer	Matt Graham
271	November 14, 1994	Pete Rose, Mickey Rooney	Evan Dando & Epic Soundtracks
Sketches include: Tomorry the Ostrich.
272	November 15, 1994	Susan Lucci, Michael Kinsley	David Feldman
Sketches include: Lullabye.
273	November 16, 1994	Phil Donahue, Caroline McKeldin	Rusted Root
274	November 17, 1994	Judge Reinhold, Beau Bridges	Bad Religion
275	November 18, 1994	John Turturro, Roger Clinton	N/A
Sketches include: Chinese Lenny Bruce, Los 20 Grandes Exitos de Andy Richter.
276	November 21, 1994	Courtney Thorne-Smith, Ivan Reitman	Sky Cries Mary
277	November 22, 1994	Katey Sagal, Al Roker	Graham Parker
278	November 23, 1994	Jay Leno, Arye Gross, Ann Jordan	N/A
279	November 24, 1994	Joey Lawrence, Carol Kane	Frank Santorelli
Sketches include: Kiss-Ass Turkey.
280	November 25, 1994	Muggsy Bogues & Larry Johnson, Chi McBride	The Cramps
281	November 28, 1994	Paul Shaffer, Ken Follett	Blackstreet
282	November 29, 1994	Mayim Bialik, Holly Robinson	Joe Jackson
283	November 30, 1994	Jon Lovitz, Jeff Anderson	Linda Smith
Sketches include: Help with Your Heart.
284	December 1, 1994	Roger Ebert, Dave Thomas, The Frugal Gourmet	N/A
285	December 2, 1994	Shelley Winters, Bob Berkowitz	The Wedding Present
Sketches include: Lighting the Rockefeller Tree, International Peekaboo Finals.
286	December 12, 1994	Penelope Ann Miller, Ricky Paull Goldin	Cassandra Wilson
Sketches include: The Life of a Man.
287	December 13, 1994	Larry King, Jamie Walters	War
288	December 14, 1994	Natalie Portman, Michael DeLorenzo, Bob Odenkirk	N/A
289	December 15, 1994	Jeff Daniels, Mike Lupica	Jules Shear
290	December 16, 1994	Dweezil & Ahmet Zappa, Dr. Joyce Brothers	Robert Schimmel
291	December 19, 1994	Gabriel Byrne, Fran Lebowitz	Matt Graham
Sketches include: Robert Smigel's Wedding Photos.
292	December 20, 1994	Boomer Esiason, John Ales, Ann Jordan	N/A
Sketches include: Skunk.
293	December 21, 1994	Tony Bennett, Jonathan Katz	N/A
294	December 22, 1994	Ellen Cleghorne, Jeff Garlin	Robert Earl Keen
Sketches include: Andy's Family Christmas.
295	December 23, 1994	Isabella Rossellini, Bill Geist	Combustible Edison
296	December 26, 1994	Jennifer Tilly, Sissy Biggers	The Persuasions
297	December 27, 1994	Tony Randall, Larry Holmes	John Pizzarelli
Sketches include: Tchotchkes Infomercial, Sponsors' Holiday Cards and Gifts.
298	December 28, 1994	Fyvush Finkel, David Schwimmer, Jeffrey Nathan	N/A
Sketches include: Run Away with Andy.
299	December 29, 1994	Nick Turturro, Lainie Kazan	Andy Kindler
Sketches include: Year in Review: 1994
300	December 30, 1994	Yasmine Bleeth, Larry Miller	Tito Puente
Sketches include: Conan Babies.
301	January 2, 1995	Mandy Patinkin, Scott Wolf	Keb' Mo'
302	January 3, 1995	Alan Alda, Bill Bellamy	Sister Carol
Sketches include: Closed Captioning.
303	January 4, 1995	John Singleton, Norm Crosby, Betty "The Bug Lady" Faber	N/A
304	January 5, 1995	Gilbert Gottfried, Roy Blount Jr, Joanna Kerns	N/A
305	January 6, 1995	Laurence Fishburne, Lynn Snowden	Jack Logan
Sketches include: Lakewood.
306	January 9, 1995	Jane Pauley, Jamie Farr	Shudder to Think
Sketches include: Continuity Errors, Clutch Cargo.
307	January 10, 1995	Willard Scott, Jada Pinkett	Joe Bolster
308	January 11, 1995	Al Roker, Debbie Reynolds	The Allman Brothers Band
309	January 12, 1995	Jeff Daniels, Lynn Whitfield, Stan Lee	N/A
310	January 13, 1995	Willie Nelson, Katie Wagner	N/A
311	January 16, 1995	John Leguizamo, Dr. Ruth Westheimer	Todd Barry
312	January 17, 1995	Mike Richter, Susan Powter	The Jazz Passengers
313	January 18, 1995	Jerry Orbach, Camille Paglia	Ween
Sketches include: Clutch Cargo, Husky Wear.
314	January 19, 1995	David Hyde Pierce, CJ Matusovich, Taxicab Confessions	N/A
315	January 20, 1995	Tom Jones, Jack Noseworthy	N/A
316	January 23, 1995	Shawn & Marlon Wayans, David Frost	Bettie Serveert
317	January 24, 1995	Joan Collins, Dave Foley, Jane Goodall	N/A
318	January 25, 1995	David Brenner, Mira Sorvino	Clay Crosse
319	January 26, 1995	Crystal Bernard, Charles Dutton	Nick Lowe
Sketches include: Rock & Roll Auction (remote).
320	January 27, 1995	Robert Townsend, Jennifer Connelly, Sr. Jean Kenny	Primus
321	January 30, 1995	Ed Begley, Jr., Richard Belzer	Belly
Sketches include: Baby Debates.
322	January 31, 1995	Paul Sorvino, Richard Jeni	Sonny Landreth
323	February 1, 1995	Chi McBride, Forrest Sawyer	Joe Morello
324	February 2, 1995	Sam Neill, Amber Smith	Reggie McFadden
325	February 3, 1995	Corbin Bernsen, The Jerky Boys	N/A
326	February 6, 1995	Chuck Norris, Peter Arnett	Robbie Robertson
327	February 7, 1995	Kris Kristofferson, Jack Ford, Bridgette Wilson	N/A
328	February 8, 1995	Spalding Gray, Kurt Loder	Letters to Cleo
329	February 9, 1995	Ellen Cleghorne, Kevin Pollak, Frederique	N/A
Sketches include: Continuity Errors.
330	February 10, 1995	Adam Sandler, Ed Asner	Freedy Johnston
Sketches include: Emergency Guest.
331	February 13, 1995	Steve Young, Vendela	Marcus Roberts
332	February 14, 1995	Paula Zahn, Robert Wuhl	Timbuk3
333	February 15, 1995	Scott Thompson, Ron Silver, Vicki Cobb	N/A
334	February 16, 1995	Deion Sanders, Matt Lauer, Renelly Vargas	N/A
Sketches include: Twenty Years Ago on Conan.
335	February 17, 1995	Rudy Giuliani, Jennifer Aniston	Alison Krauss
Sketches include: NBA All Star Game (remote).
336	February 20, 1995	Kevin Nealon, Charo	Buddy Guy
Sketches include: Feuding Lincolns.
337	February 21, 1995	Reggie Miller, Rich Hall	Milla
Sketches include: In the Year 2000.
338	February 22, 1995	Bill Maher, Eddie Griffin	Dante
Sketches include: Damaged Goods.
339	February 23, 1995	Tom Brokaw, Norm Macdonald, Angie Everhart	N/A
Sketches include: Clutch Cargo.
340	February 24, 1995	Michael McKean, Regina Taylor	Big Head Todd & The Monsters
341	February 27, 1995	Daniel Baldwin, Robert Stack	Henriette Mantel
Sketches include: Tomorry the Ostrich.
342	February 28, 1995	Harvey Fierstein, Beverly Johnson	Fontella Bass
343	March 1, 1995	Al Roker, Kevin McDonald	Margaret Smith
344	March 2, 1995	Richard Benjamin, Pat Finn	The Band
Sketches include: Andy's Self-Help Videos, a phone call from Keith Richards.
345	March 3, 1995	Dweezil & Ahmet Zappa, John Tesh	Little Milton
346	March 6, 1995	D. B. Sweeney, Alexandra Paul	Todd Snider
Sketches include: Kids' Drawings.
347	March 7, 1995	Jasmine Guy, Leiber & Stoller, Fr. Orsini	N/A
348	March 8, 1995	Jennifer Tilly, Timothy Busfield	Chuck Sklar
349	March 9, 1995	Tori Spelling, Kevin Meaney	The Roots
350	March 10, 1995	Teri Hatcher, Jerry Springer	Al Kooper
351	March 13, 1995	Valerie Harper, Harry Shearer	David Ball
352	March 14, 1995	Donny Osmond, Nigel Hawthorne, Richard Preston	N/A
Sketches include: Art Critique.
353	March 15, 1995	Suzanne Somers, Chris O'Donnell	The Chieftains
354	March 16, 1995	Paul Reiser, Louis Gossett Jr., Colin Quinn	N/A
Sketches include: Andy at Spring Training (remote), Clutch Cargo, Moral Dilemma.
355	March 17, 1995	Bob Barker, Julianna Margulies	Black 47
Sketches include: Audience Thoughts, If They Were Irish.
356	March 20, 1995	Joan Rivers, Mark Curry	Patty Loveless
357	March 21, 1995	Will Smith, Jeffrey Lyons	Robert Schimmel
358	March 22, 1995	Holly Robinson, Bob Eubanks	Medeski Martin & Wood
359	March 23, 1995	Brian Dennehy, David Arquette	Ivan Neville
Sketches include: Tomorry the Ostrich.
360	March 24, 1995	David Brenner, Laura Leighton, David Cross	N/A
Sketches include: Andy's Book Stevey Squirrel.
361	April 3, 1995	Mimi Rogers, Brian Doyle Murray	Robyn Hitchcock
362	April 4, 1995	Margaret Cho, Malcolm McLaren, John Ridley	N/A
Sketches include: NCAA Championship Game Re-Enactment.
363	April 5, 1995	Charles Grodin, Faith Ford, James Ellroy	N/A
364	April 6, 1995	Chris Farley, Toni Collette	Widespread Panic
Sketches include: Checking the Security Camera.
365	April 7, 1995	Scott Thompson, Eric Stoltz	Matthew Sweet
366	April 10, 1995	María Conchita Alonso, David Keith	Juliana Hatfield
367	April 11, 1995	Tia Carrere, Mike Lupica	The Murmurs
368	April 12, 1995	Nancy Sinatra, Craig Sheffer	Morphine
369	April 13, 1995	David Spade, Karen Alexander	Ed Crasnick
370	April 14, 1995	LL Cool J, Leila Kenzle	Mark McGrath
371	April 17, 1995	Robert Pastorelli, Eleanor Mondale	Charlie Sexton
372	April 18, 1995	Deborah Norville, Rich Hall, Jack Coen	N/A
373	April 19, 1995	Don Novello as Father Guido Sarducci, Victoria Jackson	Dion, Tiny Tim (musician)
374	April 20, 1995	Susan Lucci, John Lithgow	David Johansen
Sketches include: Emergency Guest.
375	April 21, 1995	Ice Cube, David Charvet, Gadget Guru Andy Pargh	N/A
376	April 24, 1995	Penn & Teller, Larry Holmes	The Upper Crust
377	April 25, 1995	Malcolm-Jamal Warner, Sam Elliott, Bruce McCulloch	N/A
378	April 26, 1995	Ivana Trump, John Leguizamo	Junior Brown
379	April 27, 1995	David Copperfield, Jill Goodacre	The Smithereens
380	April 28, 1995	Tony Randall, Al Franken	Jon Ross
381	May 1, 1995	Montel Williams, Peter Berg	Radney Foster
382	May 2, 1995	Corbin Bernsen, Fyvush Finkel	Popa Chubby
Sketches include: David Copperfield.
383	May 3, 1995	Ellen Cleghorne, Anka Radakovich, Jack Ford	N/A
384	May 4, 1995	Bob Saget, Matthew Perry, Megan Douglas	N/A
385	May 5, 1995	Harry Connick Jr, Stephen King	Cold Water Flat
386	May 8, 1995	Jane Pauley, Jay Mohr	Marc Shaiman
387	May 9, 1995	Garry Marshall, Vicki Lewis	Tracy Byrd
388	May 10, 1995	Phil Donahue, Robin Quivers	Throwing Muses
389	May 11, 1995	Sinbad, Kennedy	Faith No More
Sketches include: What in the World, David Copperfield.
390	May 12, 1995	Peter Gallagher, Naomi Judd, Ashley Richardson	N/A
391	May 15, 1995	Andy Griffith, Lisa Kudrow	Jewel
Sketches include: Polly the NBC Peacock, Demographic Minute.
392	May 16, 1995	Kathleen Turner, Kate Mulgrew	Suits
Sketches include: Staring Contest, 30 Years from Today.
393	May 17, 1995	LL Cool J, Carol Leifer, Dave Barry	N/A
394	May 18, 1995	Leeza Gibbons, Julie White	David Feldman
395	May 19, 1995	Fran Drescher, Harry Shearer	Mary J. Blige
Sketches include: Instant Made-for-TV Movie.
396	May 22, 1995	David Alan Grier, Gillian Anderson	All
397	May 23, 1995	Ice-T, Nancy Glass	Dana Gould
398	May 24, 1995	Robin Leach, Hunter Reno	Crystal Waters
399	May 25, 1995	Ellen Cleghorne, Don Ho	The Rembrandts
400	May 26, 1995	Tim Conway, Dan Butler, Tom Felice	N/A
401	June 5, 1995	Alan King, Fran Lebowitz	General Public
Sketches include: Closed Captioning, Channel Surfing.
402	June 6, 1995	Parker Posey, Richard Jeni, David Fisher	N/A
Sketches include: Clutch Cargo, the Heroic Scotsmen.
403	June 7, 1995	Paul Sorvino, Sandra Taylor, Peter Gawky	N/A
Sketches include: Guest Autographs.
404	June 8, 1995	Jennie Garth, Ashley Judd	Catherine Wheel
Sketches include: If They Mated, Secret Cues.
405	June 9, 1995	Larry King, Yasmine Bleeth	Wilco
Sketches include: In the Year 2000, the Heroic Scotsmen.
406	June 12, 1995	David Brenner, Jane Leeves	Radiohead
Sketches include: Andy at Pocahontas Premiere (remote), Clutch Cargo.
407	June 13, 1995	The Smothers Brothers, Norm Macdonald	N/A
Sketches include: Continuity Errors, Channel Surfing, the Heroic Scotsmen.
408	June 14, 1995	Jackie Collins, Jack Valenti	Jamie Walters
Sketches include: Clutch Cargo.
409	June 15, 1995	Teri Garr, Sherry Stringfield	Branford Marsalis
Sketches include: Actual Items, Conan's Dads Awards.
410	June 19, 1995	Don King, John Henson	Mudhoney
Sketches include: Clutch Cargo.
411	June 20, 1995	Julius Erving, Oliver Platt	The Rake's Progress
Sketches include: Breaking World Records, David Copperfield.
412	June 21, 1995	Paul Provenza, Joely Fisher	Kim Richey
Sketches include: Patterns, Demographic Minute.
413	June 22, 1995	Jack Wagner, Mario Elie	Steve Forbert
Sketches include: New Stamps, During the Commercial Break.
414	June 23, 1995	Circle Line Boat Show: Janeane Garofalo, Buster Poindexter	N/A
415	June 26, 1995	Crystal Bernard, Calvin Trillin	Beau Jocque
Sketches include: Stanley Cup, the Heroic Scotsmen.
416	June 27, 1995	Claude Lemieux, Chi McBride	Our Lady Peace
Sketches include: Clutch Cargo, 30 Years from Today.
417	June 28, 1995	Andrea Martin, Hugh Downs, Ron Popeil	N/A
Sketches include: Christie's Bargain Basement, Max Weinberg's Greatest Hits.
418	June 29, 1995	Ron Howard, RuPaul	N/A
Sketches include: Cheer Up, Hugh Grant; Stanley Cup.
419	June 30, 1995	David Hasselhoff, Patti Davis	A. J. Croce
420	July 10, 1995	Carl Reiner, Jonathan Silverman	Alex Chilton
Sketches include: In the Year 2000, the Poetry of Max Weinberg.
421	July 11, 1995	Joan Rivers, Jim Lovell, Tabitha Soren	N/A
Sketches include: Identifying Song Titles, Moral Dilemma.
422	July 12, 1995	Ringo Starr, Cheryl Tiegs	Brian Kiley
Sketches include: Life after the OJ Trial, Demographic Minute.
423	July 13, 1995	Margaret Cho, Harry Shearer	Green Apple Quick Step
424	July 14, 1995	Kathleen Turner, Dee Dee Myers	Buffalo Tom
425	July 17, 1995	Ellen Cleghorne, Rich Hall	X
Sketches include: Andy in the OJ Trial.
426	July 18, 1995	Robert Klein, Katherine Heigl	Squirrel Nut Zippers
Sketches include: Closed Captioning, Viewer Letters, Tomorry the Ostrich.
427	July 19, 1995	Rudy Giuliani, Howie Mandel	N/A
Sketches include: Late Night Bloopers, Andy Conveys an Emotion, Dubbed Classics.
428	July 20, 1995	Greta Scacchi, Chris Columbus	Mario Cantone
Sketches include: Ira the Publicist, The Band Show.
429	July 21, 1995	Michael Moore, Paul Rudd	Fred Schneider
430	July 24, 1995	Eric Bogosian, Crystal Bernard	Jen Trynin
Sketches include: Clutch Cargo, 30 Years from Today.
431	July 25, 1995	Cyndi Lauper, Jeff Garlin	Luscious Jackson
Sketches include: Celebrity Resumes, Adjust the Audio.
432	July 26, 1995	Steven Wright, Evander Holyfield	Bill McCuddy
Sketches include: Behind the Scenes at Late Night, the Heroic Scotsmen.
433	July 27, 1995	Ray Liotta, Billy Dee Williams	Ray Romano
Sketches include: Camp Souvenirs, Oldy Olson with the Olympic Torch, The Heavy-Handed Players.
434	July 28, 1995	Roger Clinton, Jonathan Richman	N/A
435	July 31, 1995	Gail O'Grady, David Anthony Higgins	Ronnie Dawson
Sketches include: Staring Contest, Oldy Olson with the Olympic Torch.
436	August 1, 1995	Linda Hamilton, Arianna Huffington	The Delevantes
Sketches include: If They Mated, Andy on the Beauty Bus (remote).
437	August 2, 1995	Anna Nicole Smith, Louise Fletcher, Dan Hedaya	N/A
Sketches include: Polly the NBC Peacock, Andy's New Couch.
438	August 3, 1995	Tony Randall, Jenny McCarthy	Betty "The Bug Lady" Faber
Sketches include: Desk Drive, Demographic Minute.
439	August 4, 1995	Marilu Henner, Kiss	KISS
Sketches include: Andy at KISS Convention (remote), Slim Organbody.
440	August 7, 1995	Danny Glover, Russell Crowe, Ed Burns	N/A
Sketches include: In the Year 2000, Audience Makeovers.
441	August 8, 1995	Richard Lewis, Jon Secada	Shane MacGowan
Sketches include: Oldy Olson with the Olympic Torch, Guest Autographs.
442	August 9, 1995	Bill Maher, Tommy Davidson	Shaggy
Sketches include: Celebrity Yearbooks, Behind the Scenes at Late Night.
443	August 10, 1995	Sarah Jessica Parker, Isaac Mizrahi	Tom Agna
Sketches include: The Origin of the Max Weinberg 7, Instant Network Feedback.
444	August 11, 1995	Unknown	Hum
445	August 14, 1995	Alfonse D'Amato	Dana Gould
Sketches include: Undelivered Letters, Moral Dilemma.
446	August 15, 1995	Pia Zadora, Mickey Spillane	Brother Cane
Sketches include: A phone call with Keith Richards, Andy's Family Photos.
447	August 16, 1995	Charles Grodin, Don Was	Chris Botti with Edie Brickell
Sketches include: Clutch Cargo, Intermission.
448	August 17, 1995	Melanie Mayron, Peter Gallagher	Marc Maron
Sketches include: Actual Items, Late Night Spirituals.
449	August 18, 1995	Don Novello as Father Guido Sarducci, Lysette Anthony	Sonia Dada
450	August 28, 1995	N.Y. Lt. Gov. Betsy McCaughey, Dom Irrera, Vendela	N/A
Sketches include: Kids' Drawings, Andy's Gossip Corner.
451	August 29, 1995	Eric Stoltz, Wayne Newton	Everclear
Sketches include: Closed Captioning, Channel Surfing, the Poetry of Max Weinberg.
452	August 30, 1995	Isabella Rossellini, Burt Ward	Dr. John
Sketches include: Patterns, Kid Debates.
453	August 31, 1995	Sela Ward, Keith Carradine	Todd Glass
454	September 4, 1995	Bill Bellamy, Marcia Cross	Julie Lee
Sketches include: Goodbye to Summer, Last Week's Show.
455	September 5, 1995	Chris Rock, Betty White	Coolio
Sketches include: Hooray for Cal Ripkin, Instant Network Feedback.
456	September 6, 1995	David Alan Grier, Moira Kelly	Blessed Union of Souls
Sketches include: Art Critique, Last Night's Show.
457	September 7, 1995	Louie Anderson, Famke Janssen, Ken Follett	N/A
Sketches include: Rock & Roll Hall of Fame (remote), Opera Singers in the Audience.
458	September 8, 1995	Gabrielle Carteris, Jon Cryer	Tripping Daisy
