= Stanley B. Goldenberg =

American meteorologist

Stanley Goldenberg
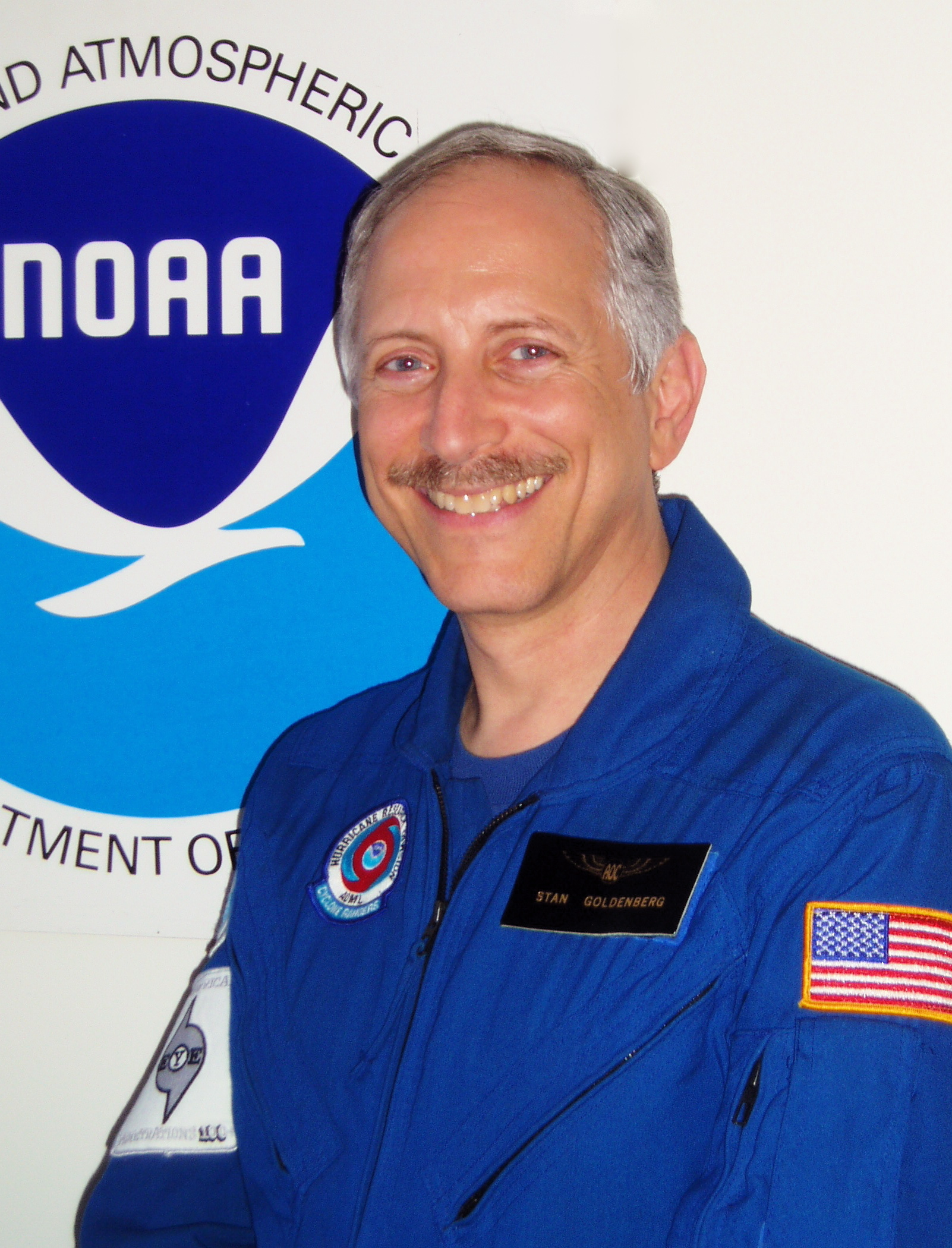
- Education: Florida State University; Miami Dade College
- Occupation: Research meteorologist Hurricane Research Division

Stanley B. Goldenberg is a meteorologist with NOAA/AOML's Hurricane Research Division in Miami (Virginia Key), Florida.

Goldenberg received his associate degree from Miami Dade College and a bachelor's degree in 1978 and a master's degree in 1980 both in meteorology from Florida State University. One of his main graduate advisors was James O'Brien, one of the world's leading experts on El Niño.

Goldenberg has specialized in climate studies and hurricanes. Stan's hurricane-related research has included developing and implementing significant improvements to one of the earlier numerical hurricane-track prediction models used by the National Hurricane Center and more recently, examining the various climatic factors which influence the variability of hurricane activity in the Atlantic from intraseasonal to multidecadal time scales. He has done extensive research into the physical mechanisms responsible for the connection between El Niño and Atlantic hurricane activity. He was the first author of the research report published in Science establishing the fact that the Atlantic hurricane basin has entered a multidecadal-scale era of greatly increased hurricane activity. The paper concluded that the increase in hurricane activity was due to natural climate fluctuations rather than from any long-term temperature trends (which some attribute to anthropogenic global warming). (This paper was recognized with the Office of Oceanic and Atmospheric Research Outstanding Scientific Paper Award.) He is one of the lead authors of NOAA's Seasonal Hurricane Outlooks for the Atlantic basin and was a co-recipient of NOAA's Bronze Medal for that work. Goldenberg has participated in numerous research flights into and around hurricanes on NOAA's WP-3D and Gulfstream IV aircraft, including flights into Hurricane Katrina (2005) as it made landfall on the Louisiana/Mississippi coast.

Goldenberg's interest and experience in hurricane disaster preparedness was greatly increased when his South Florida home was destroyed as he and his family experienced the full force of Category 5 Hurricane Andrew in 1992. His family's personal experience, as well as his scientific expertise, have been featured in numerous TV specials such as Cyclone! (National Geographic/PBS), Storm Stories (The Weather Channel) and Savage Skies (PBS). Goldenberg has published a number of scientific papers, is frequently interviewed by local, national and international media and has been a regular speaker at scientific, insurance, and hurricane preparedness conferences.

He has also been a research scientist at the University of Washington from 1986–1989 and for a short time taught Mathematics and Science at a Messianic Jewish academy.

== Works ==
1. Goldenberg, S.B., C.W. Landsea, A.M. Mestas-Nunez, and W.M. Gray. The recent increase in Atlantic hurricane activity: Causes and implications. Science, 293(5529):474-479, doi:10.1126/science.1060040 2001
