= Paul Nardizzi =

Paul Nardizzi is an American stand-up comedian based in the Boston, Massachusetts area. Nardizzi is the winner of the 2001 Boston Comedy Festival, and HBO's U.S. Comedy and Arts Festival in 1997. He has appeared on the television programs Evening at the Improv and Late Night with Conan O'Brien. Nardizzi has authored the books 602 Reasons To Be Pissed Off and The Sarcastic Sports Trivia Book (Volumes 1 and 2). He is also the co-author (along with Dave Barend) of the books Things That Might Annoy a Yankee Fan and Things That Might Annoy a Jets Fan.

== Personal life ==
Paul is married with 4 children and currently lives in Framingham, Massachusetts.

== Discography ==
- Sucking A Cow's Udder During A Solar Eclipse (2007)
- Turducken (2009)
