= Lillian Salerno =

American attorney and entrepreneur (born 1961)

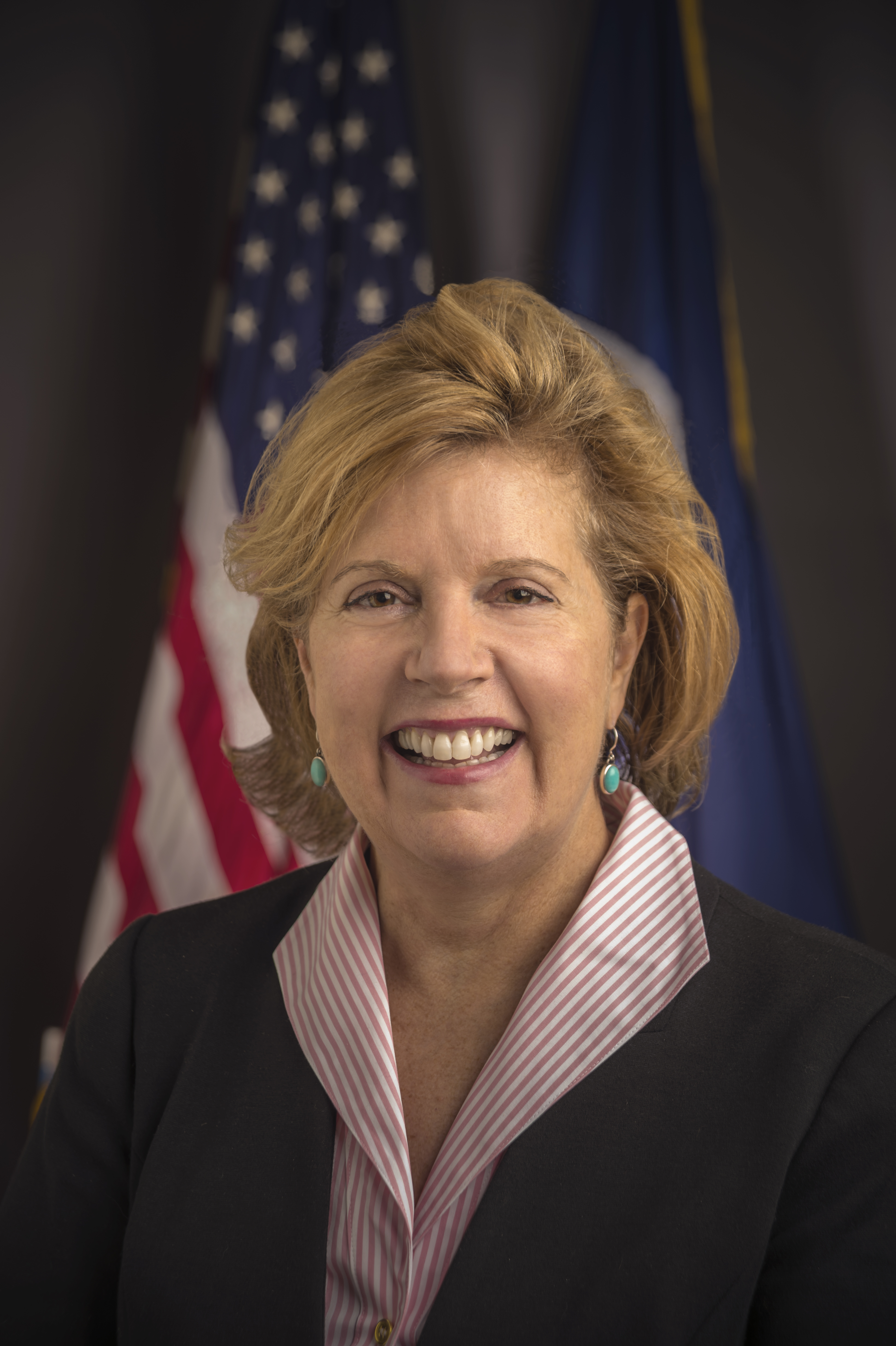
- Salerno in 2014

Deputy Undersecretary for Rural Development, United States Department of Agriculture
- In office 2015–2017
- President: Barack Obama
- Preceded by: Doug O'Brien
- Succeeded by: Vernita Dore

Personal details
- Born: 1961 (age 64–65)
- Education: University of Texas (BA); University of North Texas (MA); Southern Methodist University (JD)

Lillian Salerno (born 1961) is an American attorney and entrepreneur who serves as USDA Rural Development State Director in Texas from 2022. She served as the Deputy Under Secretary of Rural Development of the United States Department of Agriculture from 2015 to 2017. She is the Principal of Armadilla Strategies and previously served as the Executive Director and Senior Policy Advisor at Safe Healthcare International Institute, as Executive Director of the International Association of Safe Injection Technologies, and as Principal and Chief Operating Officer of Retractable Technologies, Inc.

== Early life and education ==
Salerno was born at the Baylor University Medical Center at Dallas, one of nine children in her family, and raised in the farming community of Little Elm, Texas. She attended Little Elm High School and was both student council president and head cheerleader. Her graduating class had eighteen people in it.

Salerno attended the University of Texas on a Pell grant for undergraduate studies, the University of North Texas for graduate school, and then Southern Methodist University for law school.

== Career ==
Salerno has held positions in government, non-governmental advocacy organizations, as well as the private sector.

=== 2015–2017 ===
In 2015, the White House appointed Salerno to serve as an administrator in the Department of Agriculture.

=== 2017–2022 ===
In March 2017, Salerno was under consideration to become a commissioner of the Federal Trade Commission.

A member of the Democratic Party, Salerno ran for United States House of Representatives from Texas's 32nd congressional district in 2018, but lost the Democratic primary to Colin Allred.

Salerno started a podcast, Pod Bless Texas, in 2018.

Salerno's tenure with the USDA, specifically how her department ran what was essentially a bank with $220 billion in assets inside the USDA, was profiled in The Fifth Risk, Michael Lewis's 2018 book about the transition and political appointments of the first Donald Trump presidency.

=== 2022-present ===
On June 23, 2022, the White House announced that Salerno has been appointed as Texas state director for the USDA's Rural Development.
