= Hackberry, Texas =

- Town
- City of Hackberry
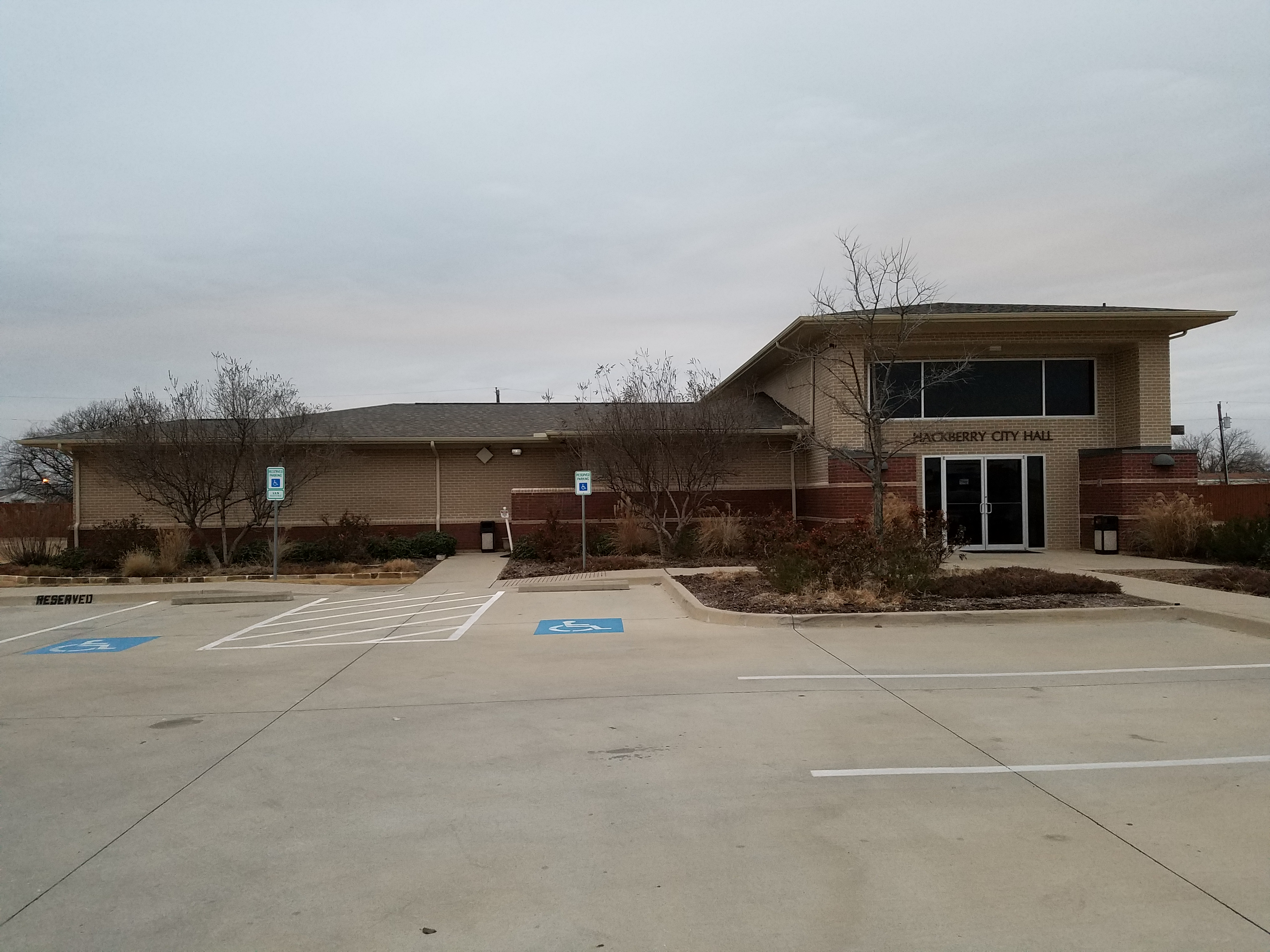
- Hackberry City Hall

- Seal

- Location of Hackberry in Denton County, Texas
- Coordinates: 33°09′00″N 96°55′06″W
- Country: United States
- State: Texas
- County: Denton

Government
  - Type: City Council

Area.
  - Total: 0.68 sq mi (1.77 km^{2})
  - Land: 0.68 sq mi (1.76 km^{2})
  - Water: 0.0039 sq mi (0.01 km^{2})
- Elevation: 538 ft (164 m)

Population (2020)
  - Total: 2,973
  - Density: 1,586.3/sq mi (612.46/km^{2})
- Time zone: UTC-6 (Central (CST))
  - Summer (DST): UTC-5 (CDT)
- ZIP code: 75036
- FIPS code: 48-31715
- GNIS feature ID: 2412717
- Website: cityofhackberry.net

Hackberry is a city in Denton County, Texas, United States. Located on the eastern shore of Lewisville Lake, it is part of the Dallas–Fort Worth metroplex. The population was 2,973 at the 2020 census. Hackberry is bordered by Frisco to the east and south and Little Elm to the north.

== History ==
The area that is now Hackberry was originally a rural community along the eastern shore of Lewisville Lake in Denton County. Before incorporation, the settlement consisted primarily of scattered homes and unpaved roads.

Hackberry was officially incorporated as a Type B General Law municipality in 1983, following a vote by local residents seeking improved infrastructure and municipal services. In 2001, the city transitioned to a Type A city under Texas law, granting expanded governing authority.

After incorporation, Hackberry undertook significant infrastructure projects, including the installation of water and sewer systems, paving of roads, and development of municipal facilities. The first city hall was constructed in 1987 and later relocated to a larger facility in 2012 to accommodate the growing population.

== Geography ==
Hackberry lies on the eastern shore of Lewisville Lake in north-central Texas. According to the United States Census Bureau, the city has a total area of 0.68 square miles (1.8 km^{2}), all land.

=== Climate ===
Hackberry has a humid subtropical climate (Cfa), characterized by hot summers and mild winters. Average high temperatures in July reach 94 °F (34 °C), while January lows average 37 °F (3 °C). Annual precipitation averages about 44 inches (1,100 mm), with May being the wettest month.

== Demographics ==
Historical population
Census	Pop.	Note	%±
1990	200		—
2000	544		172.0%
2010	968		77.9%
2020	2,973		207.1%
U.S. Decennial Census

Hackberry racial composition as of 2020 (NH = Non-Hispanic) (Note: Note: the US Census treats Hispanic/Latino as an ethnic category. This table excludes Latinos from the racial categories and assigns them to a separate category. Hispanics/Latinos can be of any race.)
Race	Number	Percentage
White (NH)	1,007	33.87%
Black or African American (NH)	498	16.75%
Native American or Alaska Native (NH)	14	0.47%
Asian (NH)	383	12.88%
Pacific Islander (NH)	2	0.07%
Some Other Race (NH)	25	0.84%
Mixed/Multi-Racial (NH)	97	3.26%
Hispanic or Latino	947	31.85%
Total	2,973	

As of the 2020 United States census, there were 2,973 people, 802 households, and 646 families residing in the town.

== Education ==
It is in the Little Elm Independent School District.

Residents are zoned to Hackberry Elementary School. Since 2020, residents are zoned to Strike Middle School. Prior to 2020 residents were zoned to Lakeside Middle School. All LEISD residents are zoned to Little Elm High School.

The majority of Denton County, Hackberry included, is in the boundary of North Central Texas College.
