= The G Word =

2022 American documentary comedy series

- Netflix poster
- Genre: Comedy, Documentary
- Created by: Adam Conover; Jon Wolf; Jon Cohen
- Inspired by: The Fifth Risk by Michael Lewis
- Written by: Jonathan Braylock; Adam Conover; Hallie Haglund; Biniam Bizuneh; Brian Frange
- Directed by: Nneka Onuorah; Jon Wolf
- Country of origin: United States
- Original language: English
- No. of episodes: 6

Production
- Executive producers: Priya Swaminathan; Barack Obama; Michelle Obama; Tonia Davis; Jon Wolf; Jon Cohen; Adam Conover
- Producers: Zachary Halley; James Burns
- Cinematography: Charlie Gruet
- Editors: John Cason; Michael Schultz
- Production companies: A24; Fair Point; Higher Ground Productions

Original release
- Network: Netflix
- Release: May 19, 2022

The G Word with Adam Conover is a 2022 American documentary comedy show on Netflix created by Adam Conover. The show discusses topics and their connection to the federal government of the United States, with "the g word" referring to 'government.' The show is produced by Barack Obama, the 44th president of the United States, and his wife, Michelle Obama. Each episode examines a different aspect of the government, loosely based on the book The Fifth Risk by Michael Lewis.

Writing for the show had started a week before COVID-19 lockdowns, before being moved online.

== Episodes ==
No. in season	Title
1	"Food"
Adam unpacks the origins of the USDA, the ways in which it keeps food safe, its challenges, and how it's directly responsible for stuffed-crust pizza.
2	"Weather"
How's the weather? The answer could mean life or death. Adam meets with those tasked with predicting the weather and handling its fallout.
3	"Money"
From bank bailouts to stimulus checks: Adam digs into the ways in which the government keeps people in the black - or shortchanges them.
4	"Future"
"Hey, Siri. Who created GPS, drones, Roomba, and you?" "A military defense agency responsible for some amazing - and awful - advancements in tech."
5	"Disease"
Adam examines the U.S. government's helpful and harmful approaches to sickness and finds that incompetence and indifference are all too contagious.
6	"Change"
A disillusioned Adam visits Barack Obama to see if the man who unsuccessfully made "hope and change" a thing can explain how to make an actual impact in government.

== Reception ==
On review aggregator Rotten Tomatoes, The G Word has an approval rating of 100% based on 5 reviews. Melissa Camacho wrote for Common Sense Media that "There's a lot to be learned here, and it's a lot more entertaining than your average civics class." Nell Minow wrote in RogerEbert.com that "If we don’t believe in government, it dies. We cannot believe in it if we do not understand it, and The G Word's depictions of the best and worst of government are a welcome first step." Some critics questioned the show's association with Barack and Michelle Obama: Sonia Rao of The Washington Post wrote in an article titled 'Why it’s hard to trust an Obama-produced show to critique the government', that 'The G Word' was characterized by a, "...somewhat disingenuous take on what is required for the government to truly serve its people — perhaps the most obvious indicator of its producers’ bias." Libertarian political pundit John Stossel criticized the show, writing in Reason that the show was "big government propaganda" that "sneers at what it calls this philosophy that the free market should be trusted over the government."
