= Morry Taylor =

American politician (born 1944)

- Born: Maurice Taylor Jr. August 28, 1944 (age 82); Detroit, Michigan, U.S.
- Other name: The Grizz
- Occupations: Politician; businessman
- Political party: Republican

Maurice Taylor Jr. (born August 28, 1944) is the President and chief executive officer of Titan International, a tire and wheel manufacturing company. Taylor, nicknamed "the Grizz" for his bear-like gruffness, started in tool and die manufacturing before purchasing Titan Wheel International from Firestone.

Taylor was born in Detroit, Michigan, and raised in Ellsworth, Michigan. He gained brief fame outside the business world when he made an unsuccessful run for the Republican nomination in the U.S. presidential election of 1996, a campaign chronicled in his book Kill all the lawyers – and other ways to fix the government. He spent over $6 million, but received about 1% of the vote in all the primaries in which he ran. His campaign is featured prominently in the Michael Lewis book Trail Fever. Taylor was also one of the subjects on the 19th episode of PRI's This American Life entitled "Rich Guys", originally aired in 1996.

In February 2013, Taylor met harsh criticism in France after a letter he wrote to the French minister of industrial renewal, Arnaud Montebourg. In that letter, he declined to invest in a Goodyear-owned French tire factory because he claimed the workers were unproductive, and insulting the French in general. He added that he would be better off hiring workers in China or India and "pay less than one Euro per hour wage". In response, Montebourg noted that the French tire producer Michelin is vastly larger and more profitable than Titan. In February 2015, in an interview with French television about the closed Goodyear factory, Taylor said that "France is a ruined country".
