= Lakewood Village, Texas =

- City
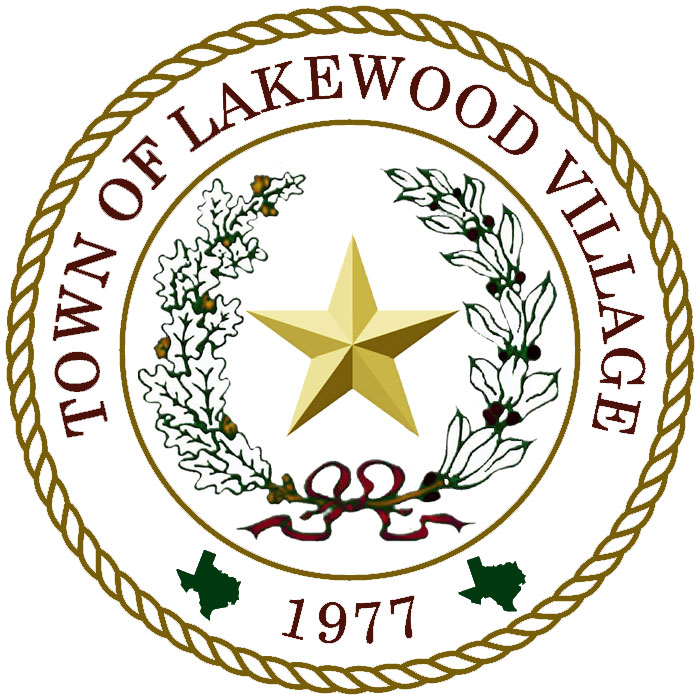
- Seal
- Motto: What a hometown should be
- Location of Lakewood Village in Denton County, Texas
- Coordinates: 33°08′17″N 96°58′30″W
- Country: United States
- State: Texas
- County: Denton

Government
  - Type: Mayor-Council
  - Mayor: Dr. Mark E. Vargus
  - Town Administrator: Linda Ruth

Area
  - Total: 1.44 sq mi (3.74 km^{2})
  - Land: 1.00 sq mi (2.59 km^{2})
  - Water: 0.95 sq mi (2.45 km^{2})
- Elevation: 561 ft (171 m)

Population (2020)
  - Total: 635
  - Estimate (2022): 797
  - Density: 635/sq mi (245/km^{2})
- Time zone: UTC-6 (Central (CST))
  - Summer (DST): UTC-5 (CDT)
- ZIP code: 75068
- Area code: 972
- FIPS code: 48-41050
- GNIS feature ID: 2411616
- Website: lakewoodvillagetx.gov

Lakewood Village is a city in Denton County, Texas, United States located on Lewisville Lake. The population was estimated to be 706 in 2022

== Government ==
Lakewood Village incorporated as a Type B – General Law Municipality on April 26, 1977 and changed to a Type A – General Law Municipality on March 13, 2008. Lakewood Village operates with a mayor–council style of municipal government. Residents elect six at-large members to serve on the Town Council, including a mayor. Council elections in Texas are nonpartisan. Members are elected to two-year terms and are not term-limited. The mayor does not vote on issues that come before the council except in the case of a tie.

Lakewood Village is located in the 26th Congressional district in Texas, which is represented in the United States House of Representatives by Michael C. Burgess. The Town is represented in District 12 of the Texas Senate by Tan Parker, and in the Texas House of Representatives District 106 by Jared Patterson.

== History ==
On April 26, 1977, Lakewood Village was officially incorporated as The Town of Lakewood Village, Texas. Lakewood Village is a peninsula in Lewisville Lake and is bordered on three sides by water. Originally envisioned and marketed as second-home community that featured a golf course, two runways for small engine planes (current Stowe Lane), and a tennis court; the town has evolved into a relaxed and quiet lakeside hometown.

From the time of its incorporation until 2021 the Town was zoned entirely residential. In 2021 the town annexed additional land on the north side of Eldorado Parkway that included a few small businesses.

In 2019, the International Dark-Sky Association designated Lakewood Village as the 23rd International Dark Sky Community in the world.

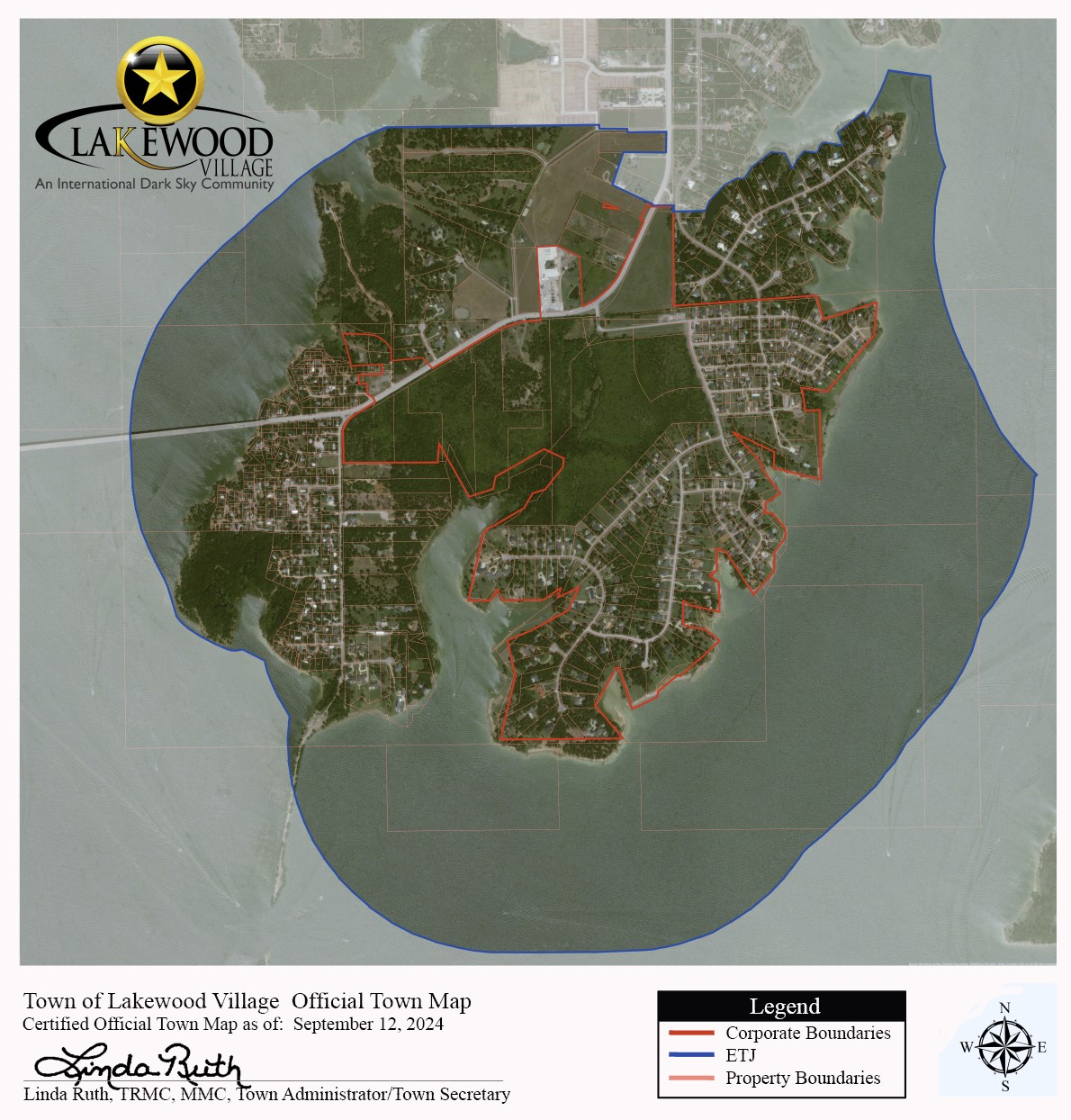

== Geography ==
Lakewood Village is located between I-35 and the Dallas North Tollway on the Lewisville Lake/FM 720 corridor, at the foot of the Lewisville Lake toll bridge.

Citizens of the Town of Lakewood Village enjoy 3.17 miles of shoreline inside the corporate limits and nearly 7.5 miles of shoreline in its jurisdictional limits. The Lakewood Village area is rich with wildlife including bale eagles, owls, hawks, gray fox, bobcat, beaver, otter, wild turkey, deer, coyote, and even an occasional mountain lion.

According to the United States Census Bureau, the city has a total area of 0.7 square miles (1.8 km^{2}), of which 0.7 square miles (1.8 km^{2}) is land and 1.35% is water.

Climate data for Lakewood Village, Texas
Month	Jan	Feb	Mar	Apr	May	Jun	Jul	Aug	Sep	Oct	Nov	Dec	Year
Record high °F (°C)	90 (32)	96 (36)	99 (37)	102 (39)	107 (42)	108 (42)	113 (45)	113 (45)	111 (44)	103 (39)	99 (37)	89 (32)	113 (45)
Mean daily maximum °F (°C)	53.3 (11.8)	59.2 (15.1)	67.2 (19.6)	74.4 (23.6)	81.7 (27.6)	89.2 (31.8)	94.1 (34.5)	93.5 (34.2)	86.1 (30.1)	76.3 (24.6)	64.1 (17.8)	56.0 (13.3)	74.6 (23.7)
Daily mean °F (°C)	42.7 (5.9)	48.0 (8.9)	55.9 (13.3)	63.4 (17.4)	71.6 (22.0)	79.1 (26.2)	83.6 (28.7)	82.7 (28.2)	75.6 (24.2)	65.3 (18.5)	53.6 (12.0)	45.4 (7.4)	63.9 (17.7)
Mean daily minimum °F (°C)	32.0 (0.0)	36.8 (2.7)	44.6 (7.0)	52.4 (11.3)	61.4 (16.3)	69.0 (20.6)	73.1 (22.8)	71.9 (22.2)	65.0 (18.3)	54.3 (12.4)	43.0 (6.1)	34.8 (1.6)	53.2 (11.8)
Record low °F (°C)	−3 (−19)	−2 (−19)	5 (−15)	23 (−5)	35 (2)	48 (9)	51 (11)	52 (11)	36 (2)	16 (−9)	10 (−12)	0 (−18)	−3 (−19)
Average precipitation inches (mm)	1.94 (49)	2.55 (65)	2.82 (72)	3.30 (84)	5.41 (137)	3.29 (84)	2.53 (64)	2.26 (57)	3.35 (85)	4.81 (122)	2.87 (73)	2.66 (68)	37.79 (960)
Average snowfall inches (cm)	.2 (0.51)	.5 (1.3)	.1 (0.25)	0 (0)	0 (0)	0 (0)	0 (0)	0 (0)	0 (0)	0 (0)	0 (0)	.3 (0.76)	1.1 (2.8)
Average precipitation days (≥ 0.01 in)	6.7	6.1	7.0	7.1	8.4	6.4	4.4	4.7	5.8	6.8	6.8	6.5	76.7
Average snowy days (≥ 0.1 in)	.4	.2	.1	0	0	0	0	0	0	0	.1	.2	1
Source: NOAA (1971–2000)

== Demographics ==
Historical population
Census	Pop.	Note	%±
1980	165		—
1990	169		2.4%
2000	342		102.4%
2010	545		59.4%
2020	635		16.5%
2022 (est.)	706		11.2%
U.S. Decennial Census

=== 2020 census ===
As of the 2020 census, Lakewood Village had a population of 635. The median age was 44.5 years. 20.5% of residents were under the age of 18 and 15.4% of residents were 65 years of age or older. For every 100 females there were 104.2 males, and for every 100 females age 18 and over there were 106.1 males age 18 and over.

100.0% of residents lived in urban areas, while 0.0% lived in rural areas.

There were 229 households in Lakewood Village, of which 34.5% had children under the age of 18 living in them. Of all households, 70.3% were married-couple households, 14.4% were households with a male householder and no spouse or partner present, and 10.5% were households with a female householder and no spouse or partner present. About 15.3% of all households were made up of individuals and 2.2% had someone living alone who was 65 years of age or older.

There were 242 housing units, of which 5.4% were vacant. The homeowner vacancy rate was 0.0% and the rental vacancy rate was 17.4%.

Racial composition as of the 2020 census
Race	Number	Percent
White	494	77.8%
Black or African American	13	2.0%
American Indian and Alaska Native	4	0.6%
Asian	30	4.7%
Native Hawaiian and Other Pacific Islander	2	0.3%
Some other race	39	6.1%
Two or more races	53	8.3%
Hispanic or Latino (of any race)	84	13.2%

=== 2000 census ===
As of the census of 2000, there were 342 people, 117 households, and 104 families residing in the city. The population density was 465.4 inhabitants per square mile (179.7/km^{2}). There were 123 housing units at an average density of 167.4 per square mile (64.6/km^{2}). The racial makeup of the city was 95.61% White, 2.34% African American, 1.17% from other races, and 0.88% from two or more races. Hispanic or Latino of any race were 4.09% of the population.

There were 117 households, out of which 42.7% had children under the age of 18 living with them, 77.8% were married couples living together, 6.8% had a single householder with no spouse present, and 11.1% were non-families. 5.1% of all households were made up of individuals, and 1.7% had someone living alone who was 65 years of age or older. The average household size was 2.92 and the average family size was 3.02.

In the city, the population was spread out, with 29.2% under the age of 18, 4.1% from 18 to 24, 32.5% from 25 to 44, 26.6% from 45 to 64, and 7.6% who were 65 years of age or older. The median age was 38 years. For every 100 females, there were 113.8 males. For every 100 females age 18 and over, there were 105.1 males.

The median income for a household in the city was $168,750, and the median income for a family was $168,571.

== Education ==
Lakewood Village citizens are served by the Little Elm Independent School District.

Lakewood Village elementary school was constructed and opened for the 2025-26 school year.

Since 2020, residents have been zoned to Walker Middle School, which opened that same year. Prior to 2020 residents were zoned to Lakeside Middle School in Little Elm, Texas All LEISD residents, Lakewood Village included, are zoned to Little Elm High School.

The majority of Denton County, Lakewood Village included, is in the boundary of North Central Texas College.
