= Ryan Watts (American football) =

American football player (born 2001)

No. 29
- Position: Cornerback

Personal information
- Born: November 7, 2001 (age 25); Little Elm, Texas, U.S.
- Listed height: 6 ft 3 in (1.91 m)
- Listed weight: 212 lb (96 kg)

Career information
- High school: Little Elm
- College: Ohio State (2020–2021); Texas (2022–2023)
- NFL draft: 2024: 6th round, 195th overall pick

Career history
- Pittsburgh Steelers (2024)
- Stats at Pro Football Reference

Ryan Watts III (born November 7, 2001) is an American former professional football cornerback. He previously played for the Pittsburgh Steelers. He played college football for the Ohio State Buckeyes and Texas Longhorns.

== Early life ==
Watts hometown is Little Elm, Texas, and he attended Little Elm High School. Watts was ranked as the number 29 cornerback and number 341 overall prospect in the country by 247Sports. Watts committed to play college football at Ohio State University.

== College career ==
=== Ohio State ===
As a freshman with the Buckeyes in 2020, Watts recorded five tackles in three games. In week five of the 2021 season, he recorded his first career interception in a win over Rutgers. In the following week, Watts would record another interception, as he helped the Buckeyes beat Maryland. He finished the 2021 season with six tackles and two interceptions. After the conclusion of the 2021 season, Watts decided to enter the transfer portal.

=== Texas ===
Watts transferred to the University of Texas at Austin to continue his college career. In week eight of the 2022 season, he recorded his first interception as a Longhorn, but Texas lost to Oklahoma State. Watts finished the 2022 season with 51 tackles with four going for a loss, a sack, three pass deflections, and an interception. For his performance, he was named an all-Big 12 honorable mention.

=== College statistics ===
Year	Team	GP	Tackles					Interceptions				Fumbles			
Year	Team	GP	Solo	Ast	Cmb	TfL	Sck	Int	Yds	TD	PD	FR	Yds	TD	FF
2020	Ohio State	6	5	0	5	0	0.0	0	0	0	0	0	0	0	0
2021	Ohio State	11	5	1	6	0	0.0	2	18	0	0	0	0	0	0
2022	Texas	13	33	18	51	4	1.0	1	0	0	3	0	0	0	0
2023	Texas	11	30	8	38	1	0.0	0	0	0	3	0	0	0	0
Career		41	73	27	100	5	1.0	3	18	6.0	6	0	0	0	0

== Professional career ==
Pre-draft measurables
Height	Weight	Arm length	Hand span	Wingspan	40-yard dash	10-yard split	20-yard split	20-yard shuttle	Three-cone drill	Vertical jump	Broad jump	Bench press
6 ft 2 7/8 in (1.90 m)	208 lb (94 kg)	34 1/2 in (0.88 m)	9 3/8 in (0.24 m)	6 ft 9 3/4 in (2.08 m)	4.53 s	1.55 s	2.66 s	4.13 s	6.82 s	40.5 in (1.03 m)	11 ft 1 in (3.38 m)	10 reps
All values from NFL Combine/Pro Day

Watts was selected with the 195th overall pick in the 2024 NFL draft by the Pittsburgh Steelers. He was placed on injured reserve on August 27, 2024. On April 28, 2025, after consultation with doctors and Steelers staff, Watts was released by the Steelers due to a career-ending neck injury sustained during the 2024 NFL preseason and he medically retired from football.
