= Trail Fever =

1997 non-fiction book by Michael Lewis

Trail Fever (ISBN 978-0679446606), later republished under title Losers: The Road to Everyplace but the White House (ISBN 978-0679768098), is a non-fiction book about the 1996 United States Presidential Election by Michael Lewis. The book is focused on following the losing candidates, particularly on the Republican side, as they criss-cross the country to try to build a following. Among the book's unexpected stars are the colorful businessman Morry Taylor, the founder of Titan Wheel International, and John McCain, who was not a candidate but who provided Lewis with valuable context and understanding.
