= Panic: The Story of Modern Financial Insanity =

2009 anthology by Michael Lewis

- Paperback edition
- Author: Michael Lewis
- Language: English
- Subject: Finance
- Genre: Non-fiction
- Publisher: W. W. Norton & Company
- Publication date: November 2, 2009
- Publication place: United States
- Media type: Print (Paperback)
- Pages: 400 pp.
- ISBN: 978-0393337983
- OCLC: 1004994994
- Preceded by: The Real Price of Everything
- Followed by: Home Game

Panic: The Story of Modern Financial Insanity is a non-fiction book edited by Michael Lewis about the most important and severe upheavals in past financial history. The book, a collection of articles and essays, was published on November 2, 2009, by W. W. Norton & Company. The text, Lewis writes, is an effort "to recreate the more recent financial panics, in an attempt to show how financial markets now operate."

== Reception ==
The Age of Financial Unreason began with the 1987 stock market crash, according to Michael Lewis, author of the bestselling Liar's Poker, who was a bond salesman in London at the time: "It was striking how little control we had of events, particularly in view of how assiduously we cultivated the appearance of being in charge by smoking big cigars and saying fuck all the time." All of the major modern panics are here, including the Asian currency crisis and Russia's financial meltdown, but the best essays are about Black Monday, the internet bubble (when a company merely had to announce it had a new website for its stocks to rise 973%) and the dreaded sub-prime mortgage disaster. Some of it is dry stuff, unless you thrill to talk of structured investment vehicles or master-liquidity enhancement conduits, but there is a helpful glossary for those who can't tell a bear from a bull. Computerised global capitalism leads to faster booms and busts, Lewis says, but it isn't the end of the world, so try not to panic.

—Review by The Guardian
