= Little Elm Independent School District =

School district in Texas

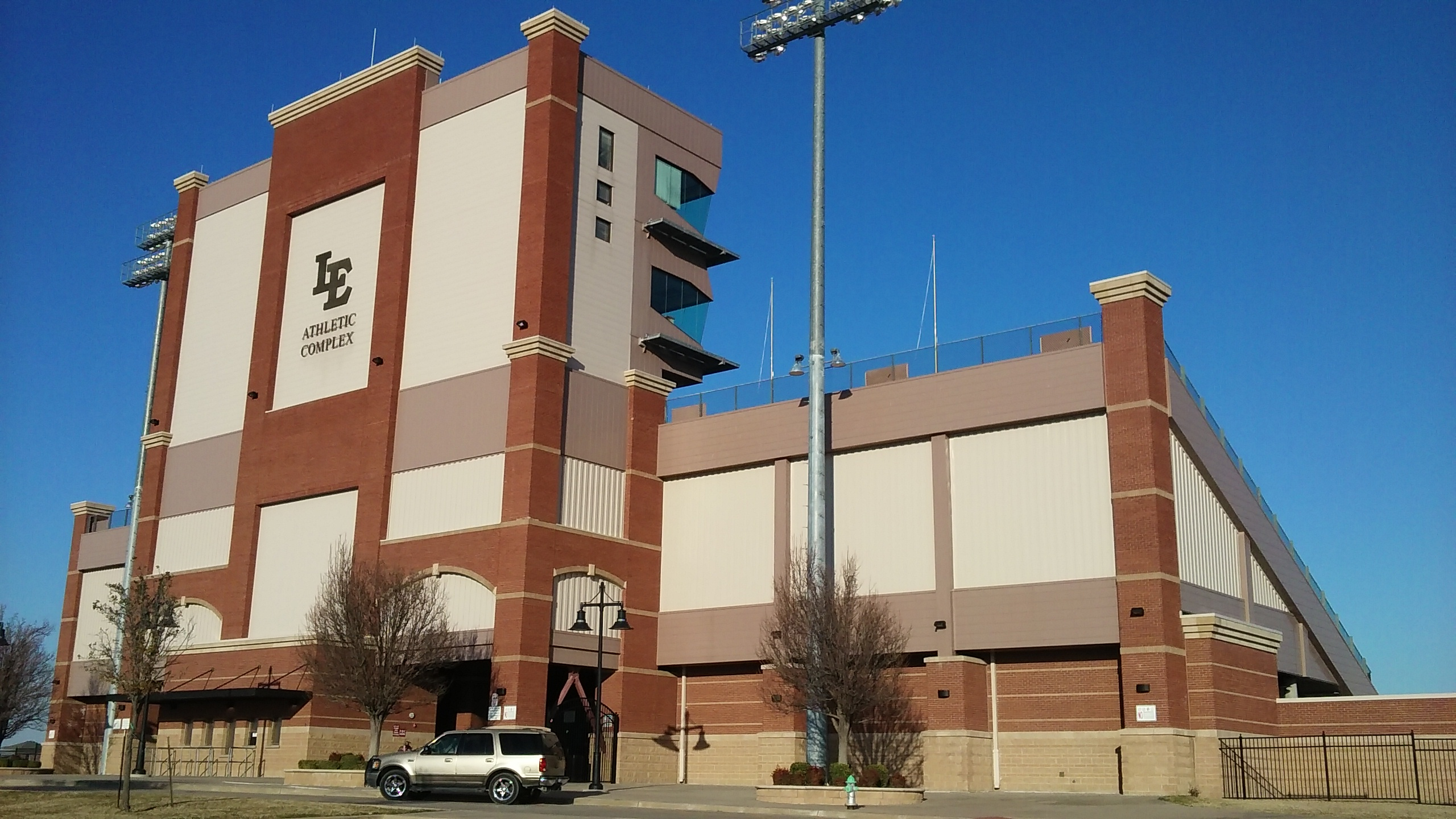
- Little Elm ISD Athletic Complex Stadium in Little Elm, Texas.

Address
- 400 Lobo Lane Little Elm, TX, USA ESC Region 11
- Coordinates: 33°9′5″N 96°56′35″W

District information
- Type: Independent School District
- Motto: Engage Equip Empower
- Grades: PK-12
- Superintendent: Mike Lamb
- Governing agency: Texas Education Agency
- Schools: 13
- NCES District ID: 4827720

Students and staff
- Students: 7,693 (2025-26)
- Athletic conference: UIL Class AAAAAA
- District mascot: Lobos
- Colors: Gold, Navy, & White

Other information
- Website: www.littleelmisd.net

The Little Elm Independent School District (Little Elm ISD or LEISD) is a public school district in based in Little Elm, Texas, United States. Covering approximately 39 square miles in Denton County, the district serves the majority of Little Elm, all of Hackberry and Lakewood Village, and portions of Frisco, Oak Point, and The Colony.

As of 2026, Little Elm ISD operates 12 campuses - including one high school, two middle schools, eight primary schools, and one alternative school - and a virtual/hybrid program. The district most recently received a "C" rating from the Texas Education Agency (TEA).

== History ==
=== Pre-LEISD history ===
Little Elm ISD's roots date back to at least 1865, when a one-room log cabin was used as one of the first attempts of public schooling in Little Elm. 1877 saw the formation of Little Elm Community School District #18.

In 1895, the town built Little Elm School to provide first through eighth grade education services. Land was purchased and a new schoolhouse was built in 1909, followed by the construction of a three-room schoolhouse in 1913.

Nearby, the Hackberry School operated from 1876 until it merged with Dickson and Little Elm in 1930 to form the Little Elm Rural High School. Due to a lack of students, the high school eventually closed and its students were bussed to Frisco or Denton schools.

Little Elm High School was founded in 1973, and on September 1st, 1974, Little Elm Community School District #47 was converted to Little Elm Rural High School District #714.

=== LEISD history (1975-present) ===
On September 1st, 1975, Little Elm Rural High School District #714 was converted into Little Elm Independent School District.

While there is no date on the official opening of the stand-alone high school building, TEA records show Little Elm ISD operated two campuses as of 1984: Little Elm Junior-Senior High School (serving grades 7-12) and Little Elm Elementary School (K-6).

In 1987, Little Elm Middle School opened with grades 6-8. The district reconfigured grade levels, with Little Elm Elementary now serving PK-5 and LEHS housing 9-12. 5th grade was moved to LEMS the following year, before returning to LEES in 1992.

Little Elm Primary School opened in 1996 with grades PK-2, reducing Little Elm Elementary to only grades 3-5. This was the first of several new campuses constructed over the next decade as the district saw an increase in growth.

D.H. Brent Elementary School (4-6) opened in 2000, and Little Elm Elementary (2-3) was renamed Delilah King Elementary. Brent ES added 3rd grade in 2001, with K-1 staying at Little Elm Primary and King ES housing all PK and 2nd graders.

In 2002, Cesar Chavez Elementary School opened and Little Elm Primary became Herschel Zellers Elementary School - both schools housed grades K-3. All LEISD pre-k student attended King ES, with Brent ES returning to a 4-6 configuration.

Hackberry Elementary School opened in 2003. 4th grade was relocated from Brent Elementary to other campuses as Chavez, Hackberry, and Zellars moved to a K-4 configuration. With only grades 5-6, Brent "Elementary was renamed to "Intermediate" in 2004 and Little Elm "Middle School" became a "Junior High School."

2005 saw the opening of a new Little Elm High School campus and much movement within the district. LEJH moved to the former LEHS facility and became Lakeside Junior High School (7-8). The former LEJH building became Colin Powell Intermediate (5-6). Lakeview Elementary (K-4) was opened as well, while King was renamed from "Elementary" to "Early Learning Academy."

In 2007, Oak Point Elementary School opened. Little Elm ISD surpassed an enrollment of 5,000 total students, but reached temporary campus stability for the next few years.

With the closing of the King campus in 2011, the lower grade levels were reconfigured and Powell Intermediate became a 6th grade center annex to the newly renamed Lakeside Middle School. For this school year, Brent ES housed grades PK-5, while all other elementaries served K-4. All elementary schools began housing grades PK-5 in 2012 and King ES was demolished.

Prestwick K-8 STEM Academy opened in 2014, allowing Zellars ES to close and be remodeled into the Little Elm ISD Administration Building. This configuration was the status quo until 2020, when Dr. Lowell H. Strike Middle School and Jerry R. Walker Middle School opened. Lakeside Middle School closed, being repurposed to the new LISD administration campus, while Prestwick became an elementary campus.

LISD reached its peak enrollment in the 2022-2023 school year, as 8,351 students were reported in the October 2022 TEA Snapshot report.

The most recent grade configuration came in 2023 with the reopening of Zellars Early Childhood Learning Center. Zellers took in all LISD pre-k students, leaving the elementary campuses with grades K-5.

Lakewood Village Elementary School opened in 2025, followed by the renaming of two elementary campuses in 2026. Due to allegations of Cesar Chavez circling the media headlines, his namesake elementary was renamed to Little Elm Elementary School. Additionally, Lakeview Elementary was renamed after former employee Dr. Ashley B. Glover.

Thanks to the passage of a 2022 bond package, LEISD has funds to build its 8th elementary school in the Valencia on the Lake community. However, due to a decline in growth, the district has shelved the construction of this campus until a need re-arises.

== Academic achievement ==
Historical district TEA accountability ratings

- 2026: C - 78
- 2025: C - 79
- 2024: C - 74
- 2023: C - 71

The TEA rating system was drastically changed in 2023, resulting in major litigation that delayed the results until 2025.

- 2022: C - 79
- 2021: No rating given due to COVID-19
- 2020: No rating given due to COVID-19
- 2019: B - 85
- 2018: B - 78

The TEA rating system was drastically changed in 2018, moving to an A-F grading scale.

- 2017: Met Standard
- 2016: Met Standard
- 2015: Met Standard
- 2014: Met Standard
- 2013: Met Standard
- 2012: No rating given due to change in ratings system
- 2011: Recognized
- 2010: Recognized
- 2009: Recognized
- 2008: Academically Acceptable
- 2007: Academically Acceptable
- 2006: Academically Acceptable
- 2005: Academically Acceptable
- 2004: Academically Acceptable

== Schools ==
=== Secondary schools ===
Name	Grades	Established	Additional Information
Little Elm High School	9-12	1973	
Dr. Lowell H. Strike Middle School	6-8	2020	
Jerry R. Walker Middle School	6-8	2020	

=== Primary schools ===
Name	Grades	Established	Additional Information
Dennis H. Brent Elementary School	K-5	2000	
Ashley B. Glover Elementary School	K-5	2005	Formerly Lakeview ES from 2005-2026
Hackberry Elementary School	K-5	2003	
Lakewood Village Elementary School	K-5	2025	
Little Elm Elementary School	K-5	2002	Formerly Cesar Chavez ES from 2002-2026
Oak Point Elementary School	K-5	2007	
Prestwick Elementary School	K-5	2014	
Herschel Zellars Early Childhood Learning Center	PK	1995	Open from 1995-2014 as elementary; served as administration building from 2014-2022; reopened in 2023 with current configuration

=== Former Schools ===
Name	Established	Closed	Additional Information
Hackberry School	1876	1930	
Delilah King Early Learning Academy	1895	2011	Originally Little Elm School, renamed to Little Elm Elementary and Delilah King Elementary. Demolished in 2012.
Lakeside Middle School	2005	2020	Replaced LEMS; located in original LEHS building; now houses LEISD administration
Little Elm Middle School	1985	2005	Its former campus became Colin Powell Intermediate and later housed LEISD administration.
Colin Powell Intermediate School	2005	2020	Opened in former LEMS building; became 6th grade center in 2012

== Other buildings ==
=== Athletic use ===
- Lobo Stadium

Formerly known as the Little Elm Athletic Complex, this stadium hosts home games for Little Elm High School. It also holds the location for the district rivalry Walker vs Strike middle school games; along with other athletic events for the city.

- Marion Field

Formerly where the LEHS and Lakeside Middle School Lobos played, this field complex behind the original high school is sometimes used for athletic events.

- LEHS Indoor Facility

=== Administration usage ===
- Little Elm ISD Administration Building

Formerly the high school and middle school, it is now used for administration purposes since 2020.

=== Other ===
- Hershel Zellars Early Childhood Learning Center
- Joel Moses Operations and Transportation Facility

== Gallery ==
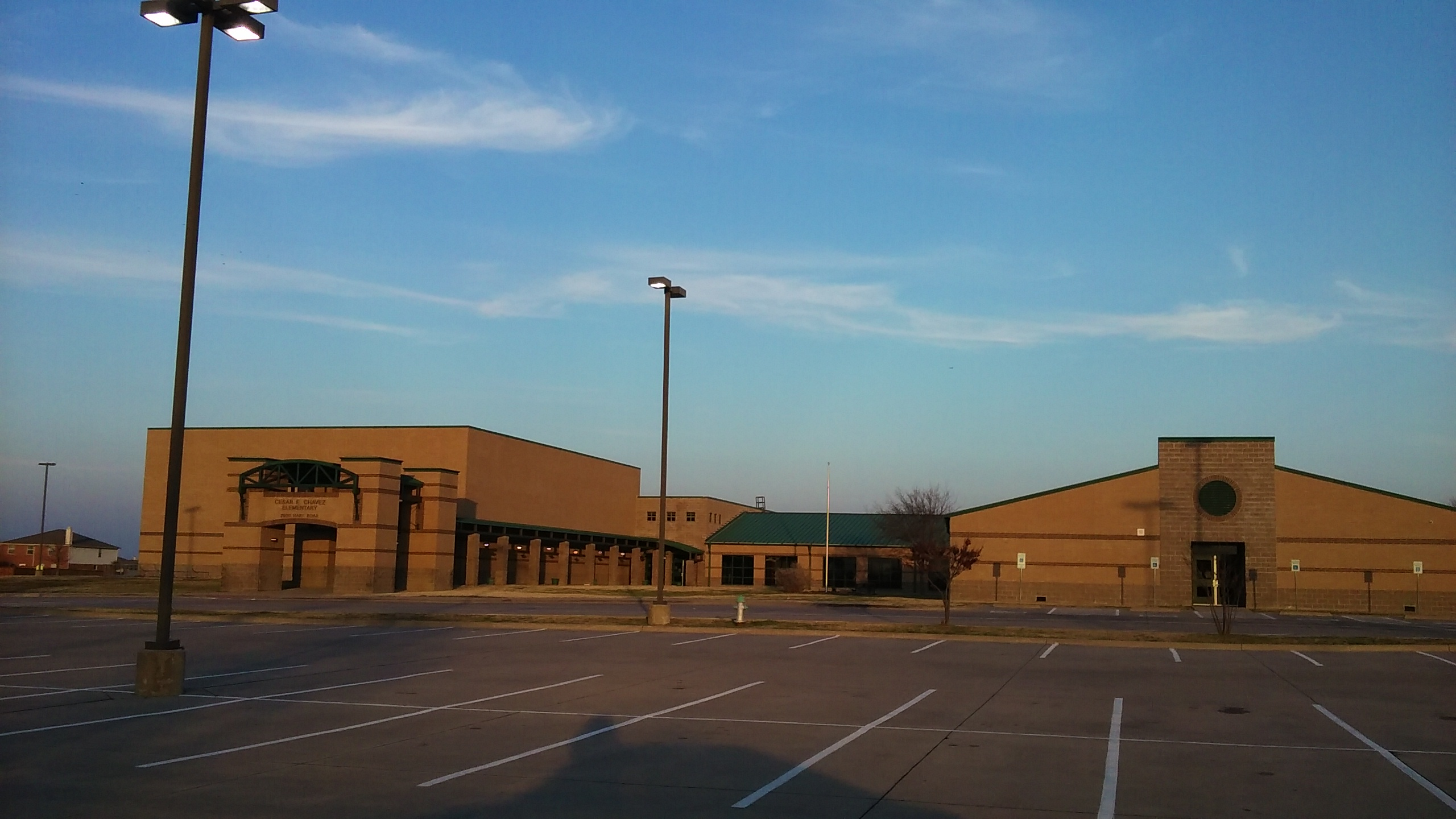
Little Elm Elementary School in Little Elm, Texas.

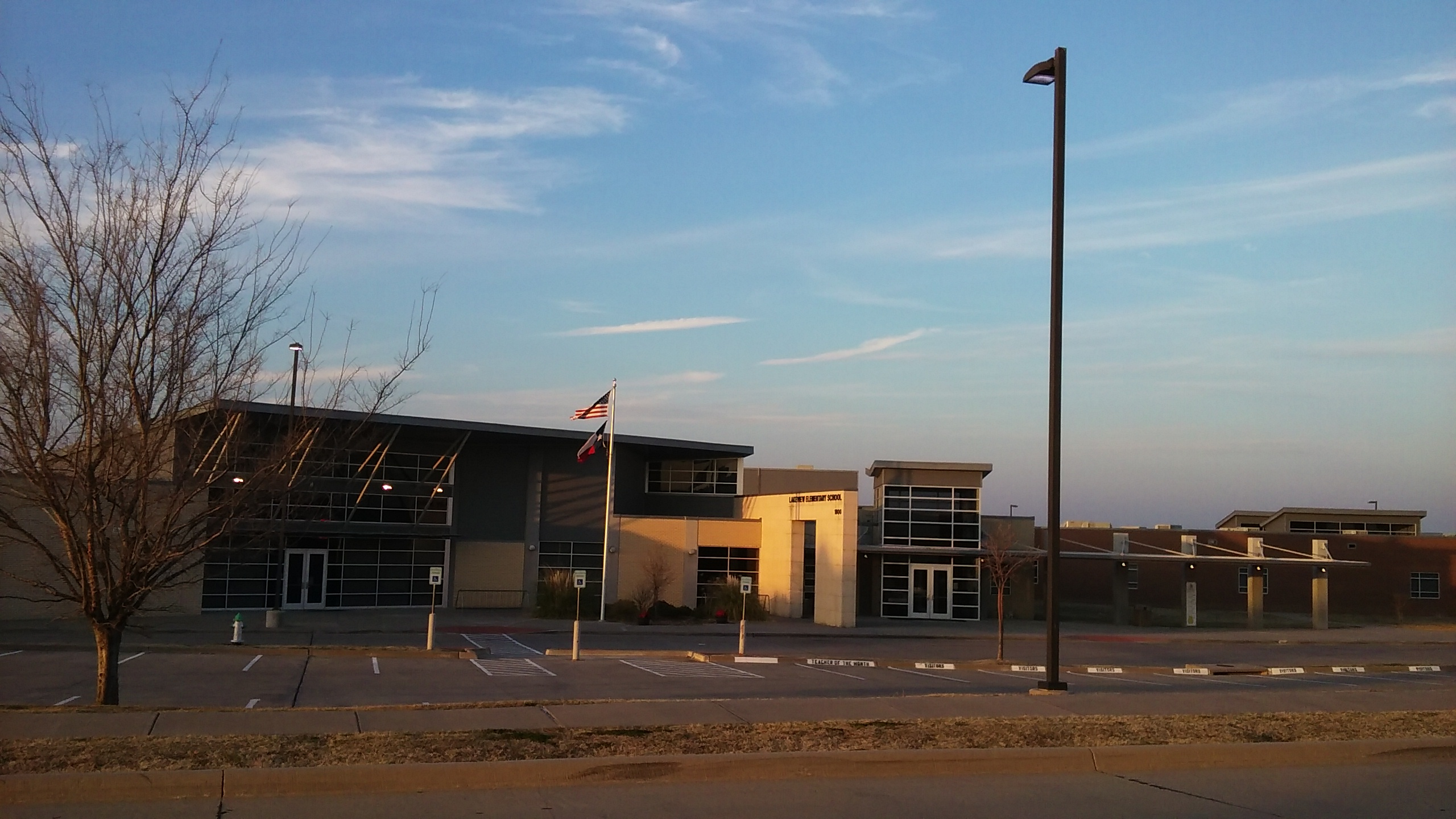
Glover Elementary School in Little Elm, Texas.

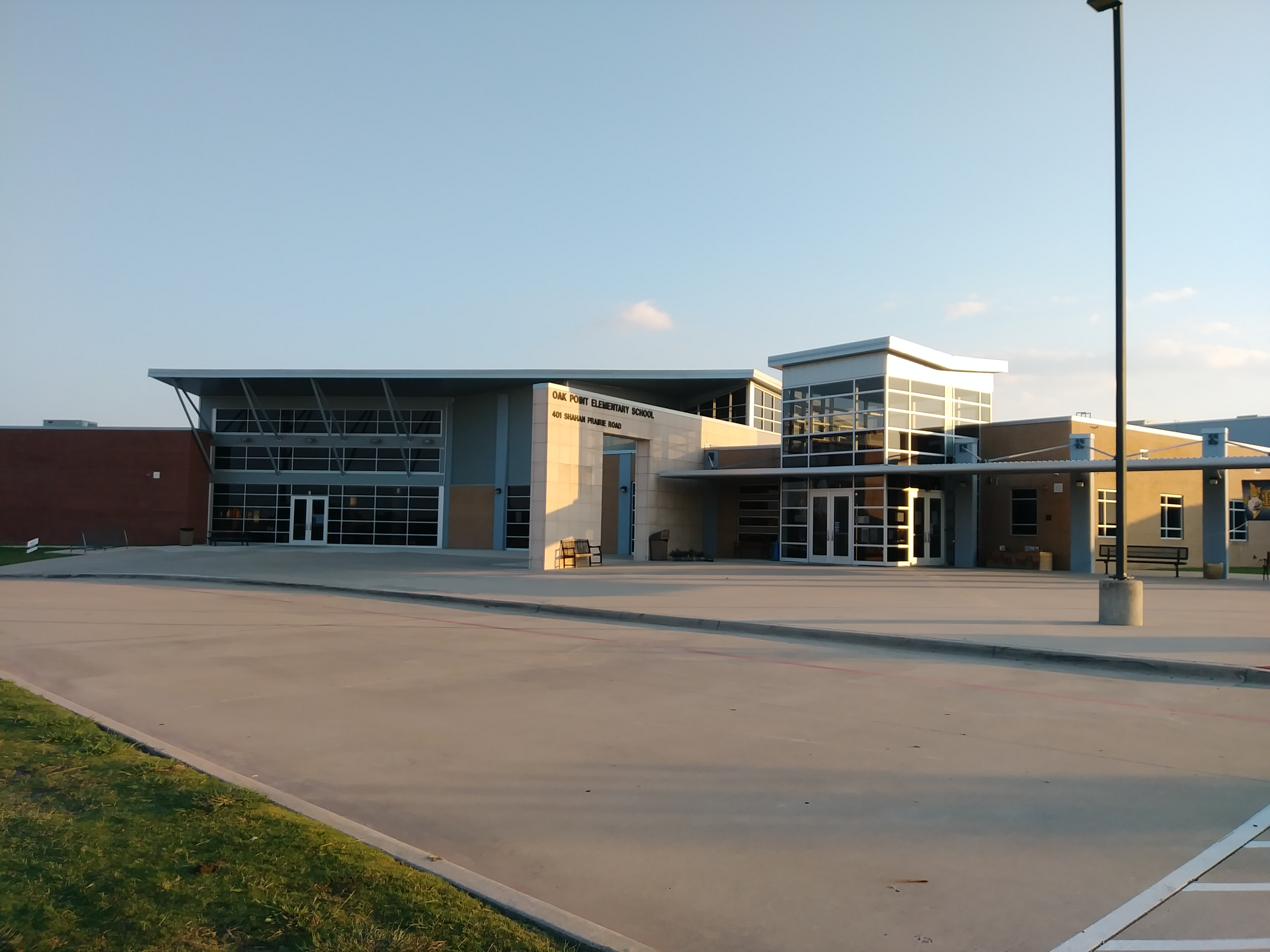
Oak Point Elementary, Little Elm ISD, Little Elm, Texas 2019

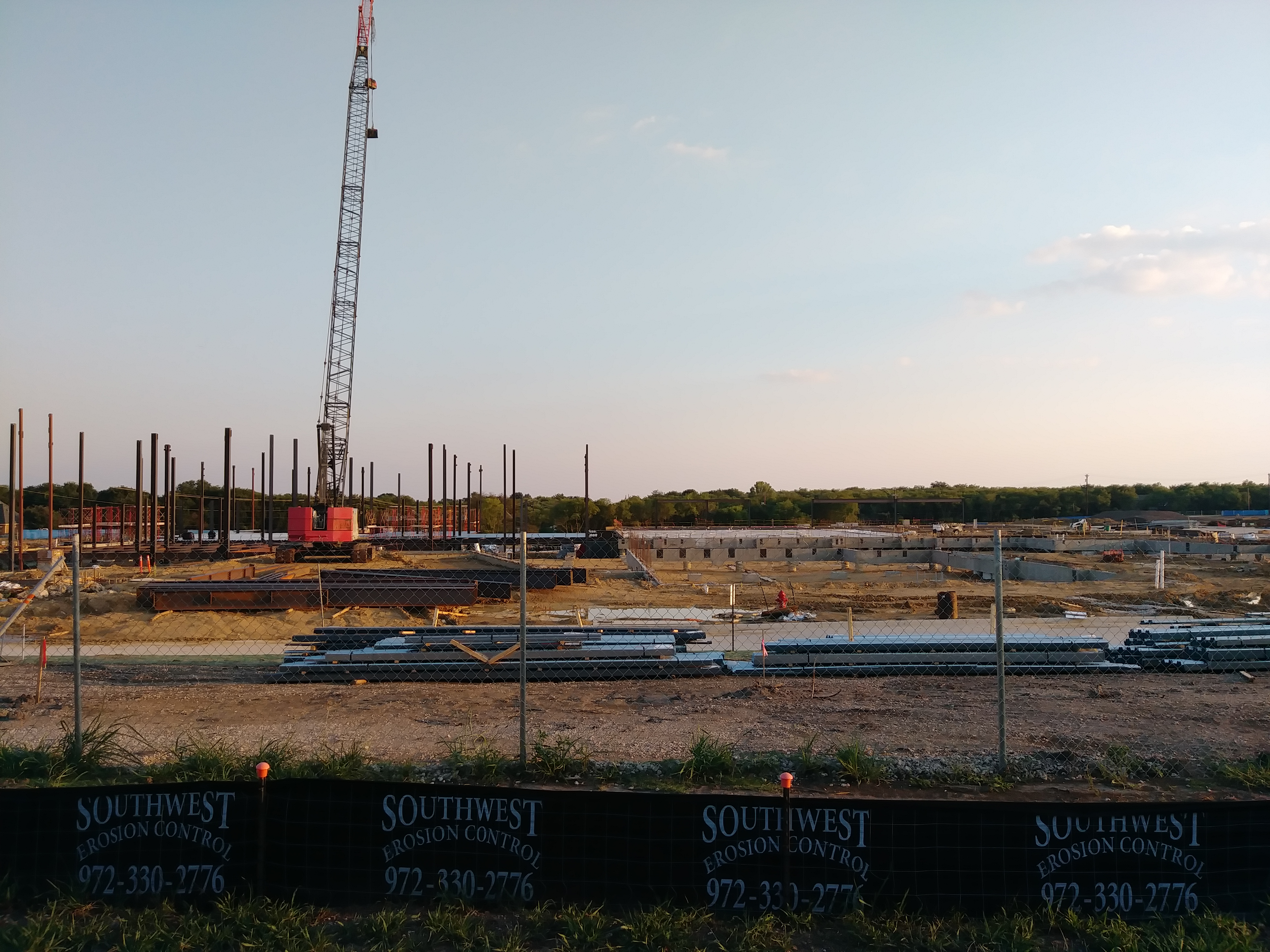
Jerry R. Walker Middle School, Little Elm ISD, Little Elm, Texas 2019

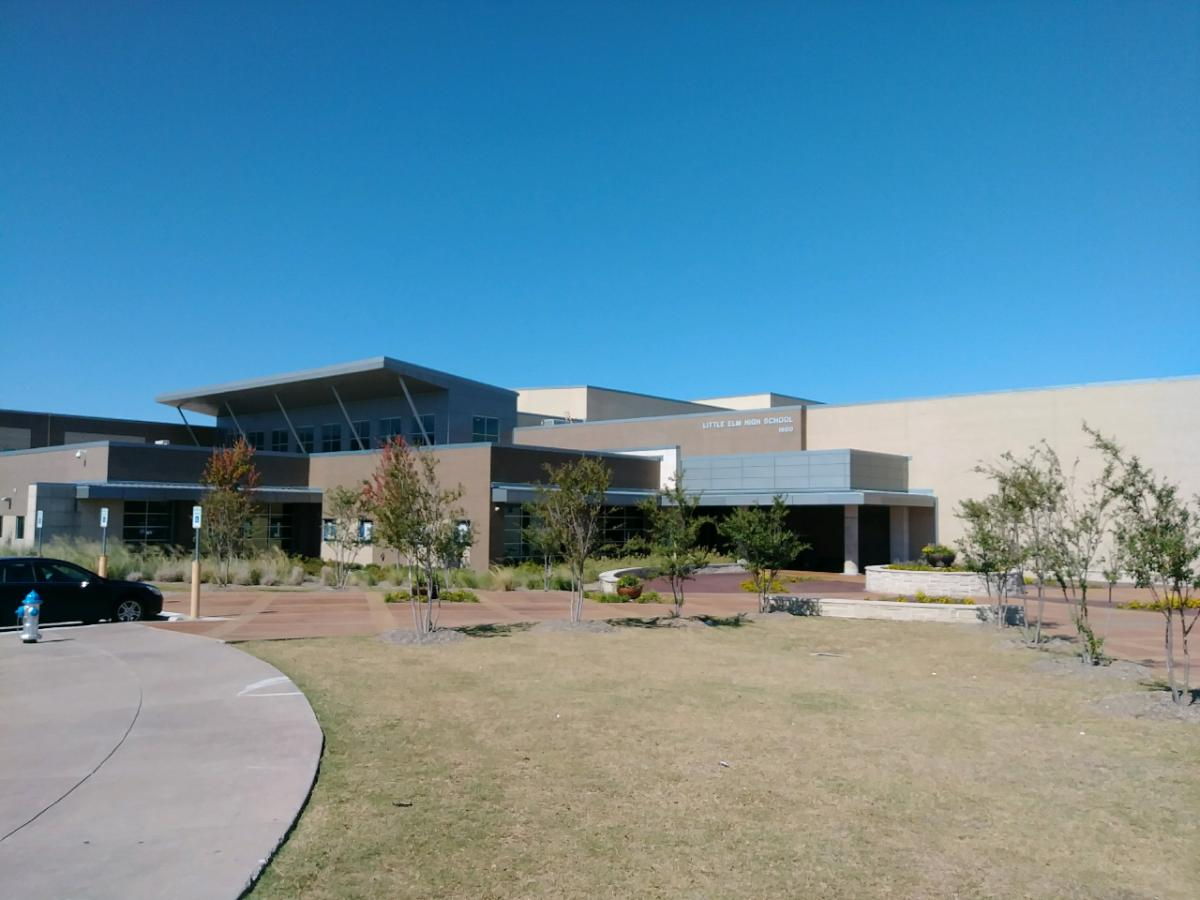
Little Elm High School, Little Elm, Texas 2019
