= The Undoing Project =

2016 book by Michael Lewis

The Undoing Project A Friendship That Changed Our Minds
- Front cover
- Author: Michael Lewis
- Language: English
- Genre: Non-fiction
- Publisher: W. W. Norton & Company
- Publication date: December 6, 2016
- Publication place: United States
- Media type: Print (Hardcover), Audiobook
- Pages: 368
- ISBN: 978-0-393-25459-4 (Hardcover)
- Preceded by: Flash Boys

The Undoing Project: A Friendship That Changed Our Minds is a 2016 nonfiction book by American author Michael Lewis, published by W.W. Norton. The Undoing Project explores the close partnership of Israeli psychologists Daniel Kahneman and Amos Tversky, whose work on heuristics in judgment and decision-making demonstrated common errors of the human psyche, and how that partnership eventually broke apart.

== Reception ==
Writing in The New Yorker, law professor Cass Sunstein and economist Richard Thaler praised the book's ability to explain complex concepts to lay readers as well as turn the biographies of Tversky and Kahneman into a page-turner: "He provides a basic primer on the research of Kahneman and Tversky, but almost in passing; what is of interest here is the collaboration between two scientists." Jennifer Senior of The New York Times wrote that "At its peak, the book combines intellectual rigor with complex portraiture. During its final pages, I was blinking back tears, hardly your typical reaction to a book about a pair of academic psychologists."
