= The Premonition (Lewis book) =

2021 book by Michael Lewis

The Premonition: A Pandemic Story
- Author: Michael Lewis
- Language: English
- Genre: Non-fiction
- Published: May 4, 2021
- Publisher: W.W. Norton & Company
- Publication place: United States
- Pages: 320
- ISBN: 978-0-393-88155-4

The Premonition is a 2021 book by Michael Lewis about the COVID-19 pandemic and the early response of public health officials in the United States.

The book was praised for its timeliness and for dealing with the complexity of the story well. Other commentators criticized Lewis for portraying characters favorably without scrutinizing them.

== Film adaptation ==
The screen rights to the book were optioned by Phil Lord and Christopher Miller through Universal Pictures, with Miller set to direct a film adaptation, and Rebecca Angelo and Lauren Schuker Blum adapting the screenplay.
