= R. J. Hampton =

American basketball player (born 2001)

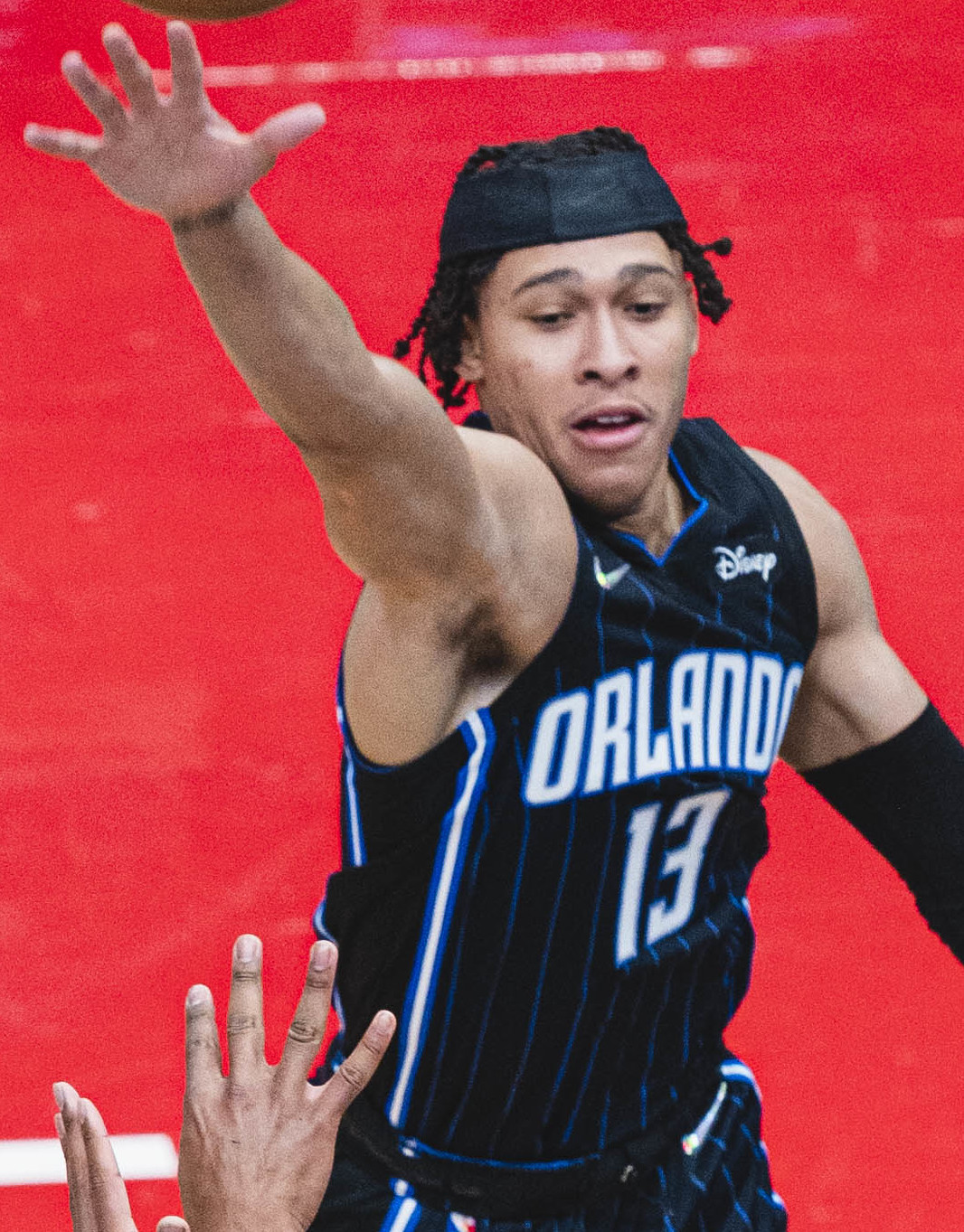
- Hampton with the Orlando Magic in 2022

Free agent
- Position: Shooting guard / point guard

Personal information
- Born: February 7, 2001 (age 25) Dallas, Texas, U.S.
- Listed height: 6 ft 4 in (1.93 m)
- Listed weight: 175 lb (79 kg)

Career information
- High school: Little Elm (Little Elm, Texas)
- NBA draft: 2020: 1st round, 24th overall pick
- Drafted by: Milwaukee Bucks
- Playing career: 2019–present

Career history
- 2019–2020: New Zealand Breakers
- 2020–2021: Denver Nuggets
- 2021–2023: Orlando Magic
- 2022–2023: →Lakeland Magic
- 2023: Detroit Pistons
- 2023–2024: Miami Heat
- 2023–2024: →Sioux Falls Skyforce
- 2024: Capital City Go-Go
- 2025–2026: Changsha Yongsheng
- Stats at NBA.com
- Stats at Basketball Reference
Medals
Men's basketball
Representing United States
FIBA U17 World Cup
Gold medal – first place	2018 Argentina	Team
FIBA Americas U16 Championship
Gold medal – first place	2017 Argentina	Team

Roderick Deon Hampton Jr. (born February 7, 2001) is an American professional basketball player who last played for the Changsha Yongsheng of the National Basketball League in China. He was a five-star recruit at Little Elm High School in Little Elm, Texas. He was drafted by the Milwaukee Bucks as the 24th overall pick in the 2020 NBA draft.

== High school career ==
Since his freshman season, Hampton played varsity basketball for Little Elm High School in Little Elm, Texas. In his first high school game on November 17, 2016, he led all scorers with 33 points in a 78–52 win over Naaman Forest High School. As a freshman, Hampton averaged 23.6 points, 7.2 rebounds, 4.2 assists, and 3.5 steals per game, leading Little Elm to a 29–5 record and the District 14-5A title. He was named to the MaxPreps Freshman All-American first team and earned Texas Association of Basketball Coaches (TABC) Class 5A All-State and Dallas Morning News All-Area Newcomer of the Year honors.

In May 2017, Hampton announced that he was transferring to the nationally ranked basketball program of Montverde Academy in Montverde, Florida, before deciding to return to Little Elm. In the 2017–18 season, Hampton averaged 30.3 points, 8.8 rebounds, six assists, 4.4 steals, and 2.5 blocks per game, guiding Little Elm to a 28–8 record. He garnered MaxPreps Sophomore All-American first team, USA Today All-Texas first team, and TABC 5A All-State recognition.

On December 14, 2018, Hampton scored 33 points in an 80–66 victory over South Garland High School, matching up against fellow coveted recruit Tyrese Maxey. On December 29, he posted a career-high 50 points, 12 rebounds, seven assists, and six steals in an 86–62 win over Coppell High School. In February 2019, Hampton had another 50-point game in an 83–80 loss to Northwest High School. As a junior, Hampton averaged 32 points, 9.7 rebounds, 6.4 assists, and 3.9 steals per game, helping Little Elm achieve a 24–10 record. On March 15, he was named Texas Gatorade Player of the Year, becoming the first non-senior to win the award since Justise Winslow in 2013. He also earned USA Today All-USA first team and MaxPreps All-American second team distinction. On April 30, Hampton reclassified to the 2019 class, forgoing his senior year and graduating from high school after about three weeks of online classes.

=== Recruiting ===
Hampton was a consensus five-star recruit and ranked among the top six players in the 2019 recruiting class. On September 5, 2017, Christian Dawkins, an agent later indicted in the NCAA basketball corruption scandal, expressed a desire to pay Hampton in emails sent to business partners. When the emails surfaced in 2019, Hampton's father denied ever meeting Dawkins. Before reclassifying on April 30, 2019, Hampton had been considered one of the best prospects in the 2020 class. He narrowed down his potential college destinations to Kansas, Memphis, and Texas Tech.

College recruiting
Name	Hometown	School	Height	Weight	Commit date
R. J. Hampton; PG	Little Elm, TX	Little Elm (TX)	6 ft 5 in (1.96 m)	180 lb (82 kg)	—
R. J. Hampton; PG	Recruit ratings: Rivals: 247Sports: ESPN: (96)				
Overall recruit ranking: Rivals: 6 247Sports: 5 ESPN: 5
Note: In many cases, Scout, Rivals, 247Sports, On3, and ESPN may conflict in their listings of height and weight.; In these cases, the average was taken. ESPN grades are on a 100-point scale.; Sources: "2019 Team Ranking". Rivals.

== Professional career ==
=== New Zealand Breakers (2019–2020) ===
On May 28, 2019, Hampton signed a multi-year deal with the New Zealand Breakers of the National Basketball League (NBL), which is based in Australia, with the option to leave for the National Basketball Association (NBA). He said that he skipped college basketball because he wanted to "live like a pro and to play with grown men and not have to juggle books and basketball." Hampton joined the Breakers through the NBL Next Stars program, which aims to develop NBA draft prospects. On September 20, he made his professional debut in a win over Melbourne United, recording 11 points, three rebounds and four assists in 21 minutes. Two days later, he posted a season-high 20 points, five rebounds and three steals in a loss to the South East Melbourne Phoenix. On November 9, Hampton was ejected four minutes into a game against South East Melbourne after attempting to put his arm around the neck of opposing guard John Roberson during a scuffle. On December 11, it was announced that he would miss about four weeks of action with a hip injury. On January 5, 2020, Hampton returned, scoring 11 points in a win over South East Melbourne. He parted ways with the Breakers on February 4 to return to the United States and prepare for the 2020 NBA draft. Through 15 NBL games, Hampton averaged 8.8 points, 3.9 rebounds and 2.4 assists per game, shooting 40.7 percent from the field. Hampton was projected as a top 5 pick for the 2020 NBA draft heading into the season.

=== Denver Nuggets (2020–2021) ===
Hampton was drafted by the Milwaukee Bucks as the 24th pick in the 2020 NBA draft, but his draft rights were later traded to the Denver Nuggets in a four-team trade involving the New Orleans Pelicans and Oklahoma City Thunder on November 24, 2020. On December 1, 2020, the Denver Nuggets announced that they had signed Hampton. He played 25 games for the Nuggets, averaging 2.6 points and 2.0 rebounds in 9.3 minutes per game.

=== Orlando Magic (2021–2023) ===
On March 25, 2021, Hampton, Gary Harris, and a future first round pick were traded to the Orlando Magic in exchange for Aaron Gordon and Gary Clark. On April 4, Hampton was named in the starting lineup for the first time in his career against Denver Nuggets. He recorded 16 points, four rebounds, and three assists in 33 minutes. On May 17, he was named Eastern Conference rookie of the month for the month of May.

On December 29, 2022, Hampton was suspended by the NBA for one game without pay due to coming off the bench during an altercation in a game against the Detroit Pistons the day before.

On February 21, 2023, Hampton was waived by the Magic.

=== Detroit Pistons (2023) ===
On February 23, 2023, Hampton signed with the Detroit Pistons. He was waived by the Pistons on June 24.

=== Miami Heat (2023–2024) ===
On September 27, 2023, Hampton signed a two-way contract with the Miami Heat. He was waived on February 9, 2024.

=== Capital City Go-Go (2024) ===
On February 14, 2024, Hampton was acquired by the Capital City Go-Go after a trade with the Sioux Falls Skyforce and on March 3, he signed a 10-day contract with the Washington Wizards, but didn't play for the team. On March 13, he rejoined Capital City.

=== Changsha Yongsheng (2025–2026) ===
On November 14, 2025, Hampton signed with the Changsha Yongsheng of the National Basketball League in China.

== National team career ==
Hampton won the gold medal at the 2017 FIBA Under-16 Americas Championship with the United States national under-16 team. In five games, he averaged nine points, 3.2 rebounds and 2.6 assists per game. He won another gold medal with the national under-17 team at the 2018 FIBA Under-17 Basketball World Cup but was limited to two games by a foot injury. Hampton averaged 7.5 points, 2.5 rebounds and 1.5 steals per game.

== Career statistics ==
Legend
GP	Games played	GS	Games started	MPG	Minutes per game
FG%	Field goal percentage	3P%	3-point field goal percentage	FT%	Free throw percentage
RPG	Rebounds per game	APG	Assists per game	SPG	Steals per game
BPG	Blocks per game	PPG	Points per game	**Bold**	Career high

=== NBA ===
Year	Team	GP	GS	MPG	FG%	3P%	FT%	RPG	APG	SPG	BPG	PPG
2020–21	Denver	25	0	9.3	.417	.278	.750	2.0	.6	.2	.1	2.6
2020–21	Orlando	26	1	**25.2**	**.439**	.319	.657	**5.0**	**2.8**	.6	**.3**	**11.2**
2021–22	Orlando	**64**	**14**	21.9	.383	.350	.641	3.0	2.5	**.7**	.2	7.6
2022–23	Orlando	26	0	13.9	.439	.340	**.838**	1.5	1.3	.6	.2	5.7
2022–23	Detroit	21	3	18.5	.423	**.365**	.667	2.3	1.0	.5	.2	7.3
2023–24	Miami	8	2	9.5	.286	.125	.500	.8	1.0	.0	.0	1.3
Career		170	20	18.3	.408	.338	.679	2.7	1.8	.5	.2	6.8

=== NBL ===
Year	Team	GP	GS	MPG	FG%	3P%	FT%	RPG	APG	SPG	BPG	PPG
2019–20	New Zealand	15	12	20.6	.407	.295	.679	3.9	2.4	1.1	.3	8.8

== Personal life ==
Hampton's father Rod Hampton played college basketball for SMU from 1987 to 1991. His grandfather Richard Evans served in the Vietnam War.
