= The New New Thing =

1999 book by Michael Lewis

The New New Thing A Silicon Valley Story
- Paperback edition
- Author: Michael Lewis
- Language: English
- Genre: Finance
- Publisher: W. W. Norton & Company
- Publication date: October 17, 1999
- Publication place: United States
- Media type: Print (Paperback)
- Pages: 349 pp.
- ISBN: 978-0-393-34781-4

The New New Thing: A Silicon Valley Story is a book by Michael M. Lewis published in 1999 by W. W. Norton & Company.

== Synopsis ==
The book is written with a comedic touch similar to that of the Lewis's earlier book Liar's Poker. The book focuses on the founder of several Silicon Valley companies, James H. Clark, and the entrepreneurial culture that dominated the area during the height of the Internet boom.

== Recognition ==
It was named one of the best books of 1999 by BusinessWeek, Christian Science Monitor, St. Louis Post-Dispatch, and The Industry Standard.

== Adaptation ==
The book was optioned to be developed into a narrative film in August 2024 by Richard Dewey at Convexity Films.
