= Tabitha Soren =

American photographer and former television journalist

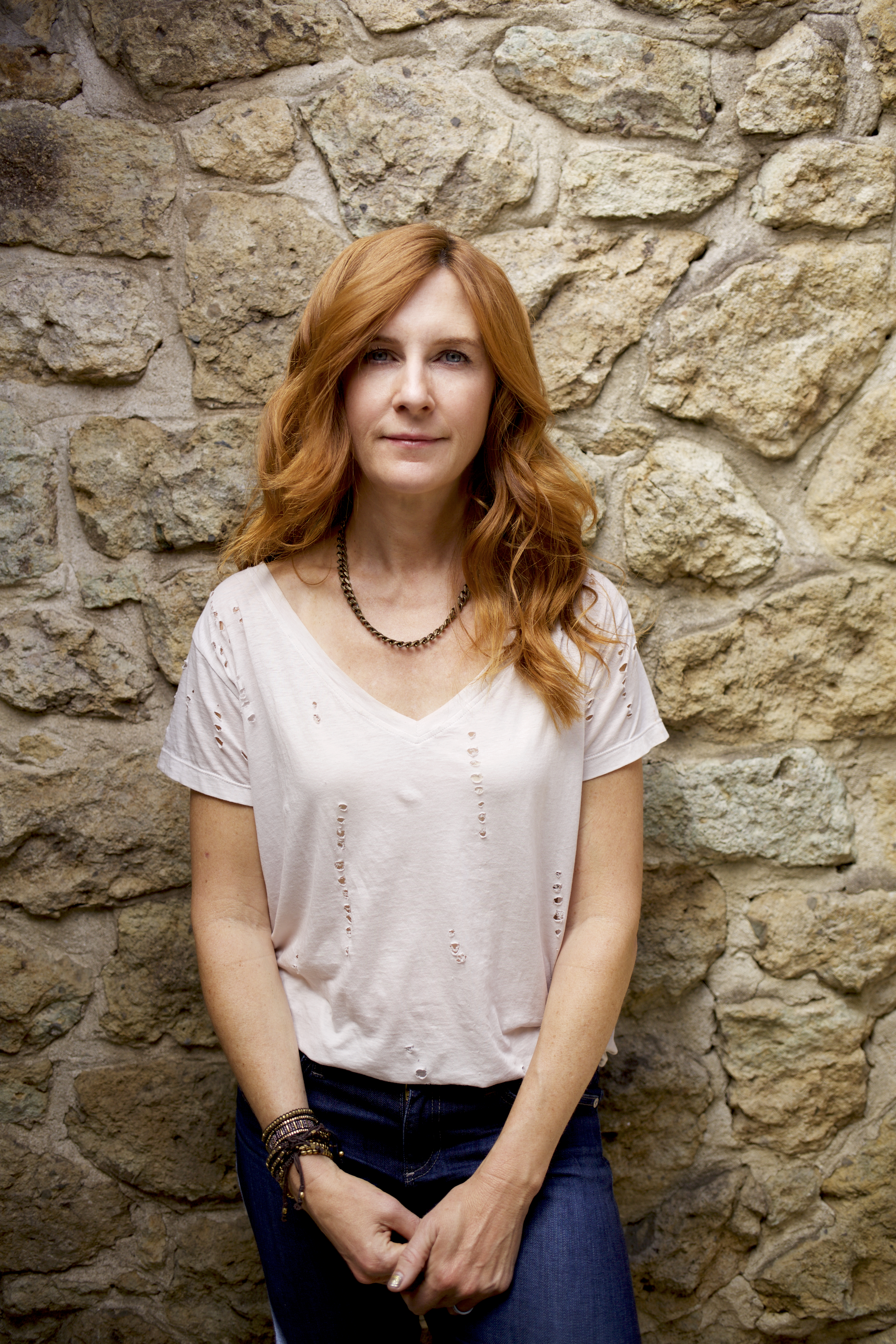
- Soren in 2016
- Born: August 19, 1967 (age 59); San Antonio, Texas, U.S.
- Education: New York University (B.A.); Stanford University (fellowship)
- Occupations: Photographer, visual artist, journalist
- Years active: 1980s–present
- Known for: Fantasy Life, Surface Tension, Running
- Spouse: Michael Lewis
- Children: 3
- Awards: Peabody Award
- Website: Official website

Tabitha Soren (born August 19, 1967) is an American photographer, visual artist and former television journalist. She began her career in broadcast journalism, working for MTV News, CNN, ABC News and NBC News, before moving into fine-art photography. Her photographic work has been exhibited in the United States and internationally and is held in the permanent collections of numerous museums, including the National Gallery of Art, the J. Paul Getty Museum, Los Angeles County Museum of Art, Harvard Art Museums and the Cleveland Museum of Art.

== Early life and journalism ==
Soren was born in San Antonio, Texas, in 1967. She graduated from New York University in 1989 with a degree in journalism and politics.

While a student at New York University, Soren appeared in the 1987 music video for "(You Gotta) Fight for Your Right (To Party!)" by the Beastie Boys. The video also featured several other cameos, including LL Cool J.

Soren began working in television news in the late 1980s. During her early career she worked at CNN, where she performed production and reporting duties, before joining MTV. A 1993 profile in the Los Angeles Times described her work at MTV as including reporting, writing, producing and editing.

At MTV News, Soren became particularly associated with political reporting aimed at younger audiences. She was a prominent participant in MTV's Choose or Lose campaign during the 1992 United States presidential election, interviewing political figures and reporting on the campaigns of Bill Clinton and George H. W. Bush. The campaign received a Peabody Award for excellence in journalism in 1993.

Her political reporting included interviews with figures such as Hillary Clinton, Anita Hill and Yasser Arafat.

Soren subsequently worked for ABC News and NBC News. She also appeared periodically on Today during her television career.

Her interviews with musicians became part of her later public profile. Footage of an interview with Tupac Shakur was included in the 2003 documentary film Tupac: Resurrection.

Soren also appeared as herself in the films The Cable Guy (1996) and Contact (1997).

== Transition to photography ==
In 1997, Soren was selected as a Knight Fellow at Stanford University.

During her fellowship, Soren shifted her visual practice from television production toward still photography. She has described the change as moving from working with approximately 30 video frames per second to making individual photographic frames.

Soren has said that photography allowed her to explore emotional and psychological subjects in ways that differed from the demands of television journalism. Her subsequent work has frequently examined the relationship between psychology, culture, politics, the body and photographic representation.

She has also experimented with the physical properties of photographic images, incorporating sculptural and painterly processes into her work and exploring the uncertainty of photographic representation.

== Photography ==
Soren's photographs have been published in The New York Times Magazine, Vanity Fair, Sports Illustrated, New York, McSweeney's, The New Yorker and other publications.

Her photographic projects have included Running, Fantasy Life, Panic Beach, Surface Tension, Uprooted, Relief, Weathering and Motherload.

=== Running ===
Soren's Running series was produced over approximately three years and was photographed in 15 U.S. states as well as Mexico and Canada. The project depicts individuals running through ordinary environments and uses dramatic lighting and isolated compositions.

The series was exhibited at the Indianapolis Museum of Contemporary Art in 2012 and subsequently at Kopeikin Gallery in Los Angeles in 2013.

=== Fantasy Life ===
Soren began photographing a group of Oakland Athletics minor-league draft selections in 2002. She followed the players over approximately 15 years, documenting their careers and lives as they moved through professional baseball.

The resulting project, Fantasy Life, depicts both the professional and personal circumstances of the players, including their experiences of success, injury, financial hardship and leaving professional baseball.

The project was first exhibited at Kopeikin Gallery in Los Angeles in 2015. A major exhibition followed at San Francisco City Hall in 2017, where more than 180 photographs were displayed.

In 2017, Aperture Foundation published Fantasy Life: Baseball and the American Dream, featuring Soren's photographs and text by Dave Eggers.

=== Panic Beach ===
Panic Beach is a photographic series centred on large waves and coastlines. The project forms part of Soren's broader interest in photographing forces and environments that place people in situations of uncertainty and vulnerability.

The series was exhibited in San Francisco in 2015.

=== Surface Tension ===
Surface Tension was developed between 2013 and 2021. The project uses a large-format camera to photograph the grime, fingerprints and other residue accumulated on the screens of Soren's digital devices, particularly her iPad. The images beneath the surface are drawn from material associated with digital life, including images from social media, text messages and web browsing.

The resulting photographs juxtapose the physical marks left by human contact with the digital images displayed on the screen. The Cleveland Museum of Art described the project as examining the marks left on glass screens and the relationship between physical movement and mediated digital experience.

Surface Tension was Soren's first solo museum exhibition. It debuted at the Davis Museum at Wellesley College before travelling to the Transformer Station in Cleveland.

The project was also published as a monograph by RVB Books in Paris in 2021, with an essay by writer Jia Tolentino.

=== Later work ===
Soren has continued to exhibit and publish work since Surface Tension. Her later projects include Relief, Motherload, Weathering, Structuring Absence and The Mind Baby Problem.

Motherload has been exhibited in exhibitions concerning art and motherhood, including Designing Motherhood and Acts of Creation: On Art and Motherhood.

In 2026, Soren's work was included in the exhibition Get In The Game at the Pérez Art Museum Miami, while Lightness of Being was presented at Fog Art Fair in San Francisco.

== Exhibitions and collections ==
Soren's work has been exhibited at museums, galleries and art institutions in the United States and internationally. Her solo exhibitions have included the Museum of Contemporary Art Indianapolis, the Oakland Museum of California, the Davis Museum at Wellesley College, Transformer Station in Cleveland, Mills College Art Museum and other venues.

Her work has also appeared in group exhibitions at institutions including the San Francisco Museum of Modern Art, Crystal Bridges Museum of American Art, Pérez Art Museum Miami, Princeton University Art Museum, Museum of Contemporary Photography in Chicago, Worcester Art Museum, Berkeley Art Museum and Pacific Film Archive, New Orleans Museum of Art and the Arnolfini in Bristol.

Her photographs are held in numerous public collections. Soren's current curriculum vitae lists the National Gallery of Art in Washington, D.C.; National Gallery of Ireland; J. Paul Getty Museum; Los Angeles County Museum of Art; Museum of Fine Arts, Boston; Museum of Fine Arts, Houston; Princeton University Art Museum; Harvard Art Museums; Fine Arts Museums of San Francisco; George Eastman Museum; Cleveland Museum of Art; High Museum of Art; Museum of Contemporary Photography; Pier 24 Photography; Oakland Museum of California; Ogden Museum of Southern Art; and other institutions among the public collections holding her work.

== Books ==
Soren's photographic work has been published in several books and exhibition catalogues. Her principal monographs include:

- Fantasy Life: Baseball and the American Dream (Aperture, 2017)
- Surface Tension (RVB Books, 2021)

Her photographs have also appeared in publications including Body: The Photography Book, Photographers Looking at Photographs, Looking Forward and Acts of Creation: On Art and Motherhood.

== Personal life ==
Soren married author Michael Lewis in 1997. They have three children.

In May 2021, their daughter Dixie Lewis, aged 19, was killed in a head-on collision near Truckee, California.

Soren lives and works in the San Francisco Bay Area.
