= Curtis Cornelious =

American politician

Mayor of Little Elm
- Incumbent
- Assumed office June 15, 2021
- Preceded by: David Hillock

Personal details
- Born: Curtis Cornelious
- Party: Nonpartisan
- Children: 3
- Education: University of Arkansas Pine Bluff
- Website: Biography

Curtis Cornelious is an American politician who currently serves as mayor of Little Elm, Texas. He was first elected as mayor in June 2021, making him the first black mayor in Little Elm's history, which was noted as a significant event in the town's history.

== Political career ==
Curtis Cornelious served on Little Elm Town Council in the place 1 (at-large) seat from 2009 to 2020. As a result of his first win in 2009, Cornelious became the first African-American elected to town council.

During his time on town council, Little Elm quickly became one of the fastest growing towns in the DFW metroplex, going from a population of 3,000 to 53,000 in just those 11 years.

In 2021, Cornelious vacated his town council seat and ran for mayor. Following the May municipal election, Cornelious advanced to the June runoff election, where he went on to win against opponent Ken Eaken. Cornelious was sworn in shortly after.

== Electoral history ==
=== 2021 Mayoral Runoff Election ===
Candidate	Votes	Vote percentage
Curtis Cornelious	1,998	53.84%
Ken Eaken	1,712	46.16%
