= The Fifth Risk =

2018 non-fiction book by Michael Lewis

- Author: Michael Lewis
- Language: English
- Genre: Non-fiction
- Publisher: W. W. Norton & Company
- Publication date: October 2, 2018
- Publication place: United States
- Pages: 256
- ISBN: 978-1-324-00264-2

The Fifth Risk is a 2018 non-fiction book by Michael Lewis that examines the transition and political appointments of the first Donald Trump presidency, especially with respect to three government agencies: the Department of Energy, the Department of Agriculture, and the Department of Commerce. The "fifth risk" is poor management which eventually results in a dramatic negative outcome.

The book spent fourteen weeks on The New York Times non-fiction best-seller list. A lengthy excerpt from the book was published twice by The Guardian, using a quote from a top adviser to Trump in the title.

Barack and Michelle Obama acquired the rights to the book for a Netflix series about the U.S. government. The 2022 American documentary comedy series The G Word with Adam Conover is "loosely inspired" by the book.

== Title ==
John MacWilliams, a risk management expert at the United States Department of Energy from the Obama Administration, gave Lewis the top five risks he saw for the department: broken arrows (loose nuclear weapons and nuclear accidents), North Korean nuclear weapons, an end to the Iran nuclear deal, protecting the electrical grid from cyberterrorism, and internal project management. It is this fifth risk that inspired the title of the book.

== See also ==
- Schedule F appointment—Trump administration plan for reclassifying civil servants as political appointees (now called Schedule Policy/Career)
