= Little Elm High School =

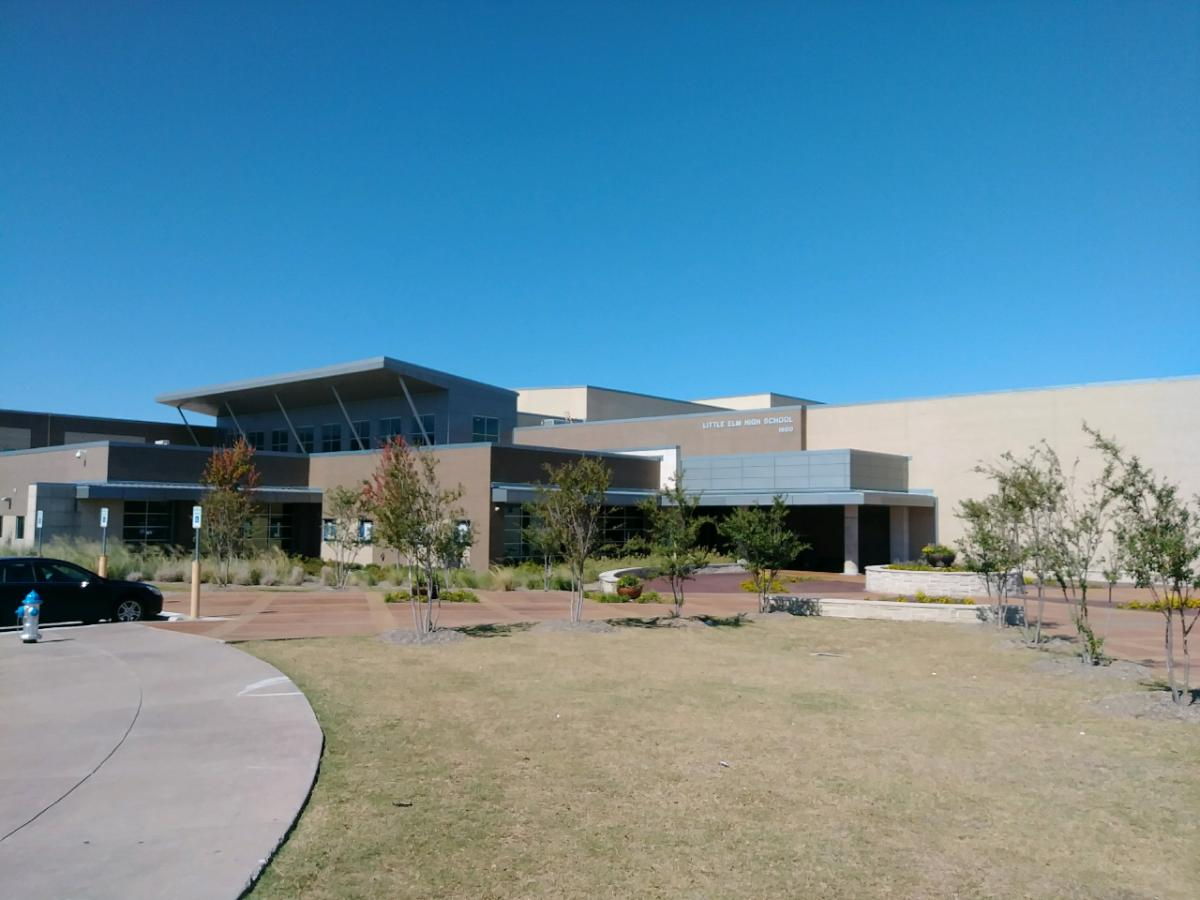
- Little Elm Front Entrance

Location
- 1900 Walker Lane; Little Elm, Texas 75068-5220; United States; 33.1813°N 96.9068°W

Information
- Type: Public high school
- School district: Little Elm Independent School District
- NCES School ID: 482772003111
- Principal: Michelle Gentry
- Teaching staff: 148.09 (on an FTE basis)
- Grades: 9–12
- Enrollment: 2,529 (2023-2024)
- Student to teacher ratio: 17.08
- Campus type: Suburban
- Colors: Blue and gold
- Athletics conference: UIL Class 6A
- Mascot: Lobos
- Rivals: Braswell High School, The Colony High School and Lake Dallas High School
- Yearbook: Lobo Pride / El Lobo
- Website: https://lehs.littleelmisd.net/

Little Elm High School is a public high school in Little Elm, Texas, United States and classified as a 6A school by the University Interscholastic League (UIL). It is the sole high school of the Little Elm Independent School District located in east central Denton County.

== History ==
Little Elm High School was established as a school around the late 60s to early 70s with students prior being bussed to Denton and Frisco high schools. The school was initially located on Lobo Lane near the central area of Little Elm. With rapid growth in the 90s and 2000s, the school district would expand what was known as the "old Little Elm High School" in 1995, and later open a new campus on Walker Lane in 2004 to accommodate growth, with the previous building later becoming Lakeside Middle School, and now is the Administration Building for Little Elm ISD.

Little Elm Independent School District voters approved a $289.5 million bond package in November 2022 that included significant expansions and renovations at Little Elm High School to address rapid enrollment growth and district facility needs, projects at the high school funded by the bond include the addition of a new academic wing, multiple new gymnasium spaces, expanded fine arts areas, and new career and technical education (CTE) flex spaces to accommodate instructional programs and extracurricular activities, as well as other districtwide improvements outlined in the bond program.

== Attendance area ==
The school district, and therefore the high school's attendance zone, includes:

- The majority of Little Elm
- All of: Lakewood Village, and Hackberry
- Portions of: The Colony, Oak Point and Frisco.

== Academics ==
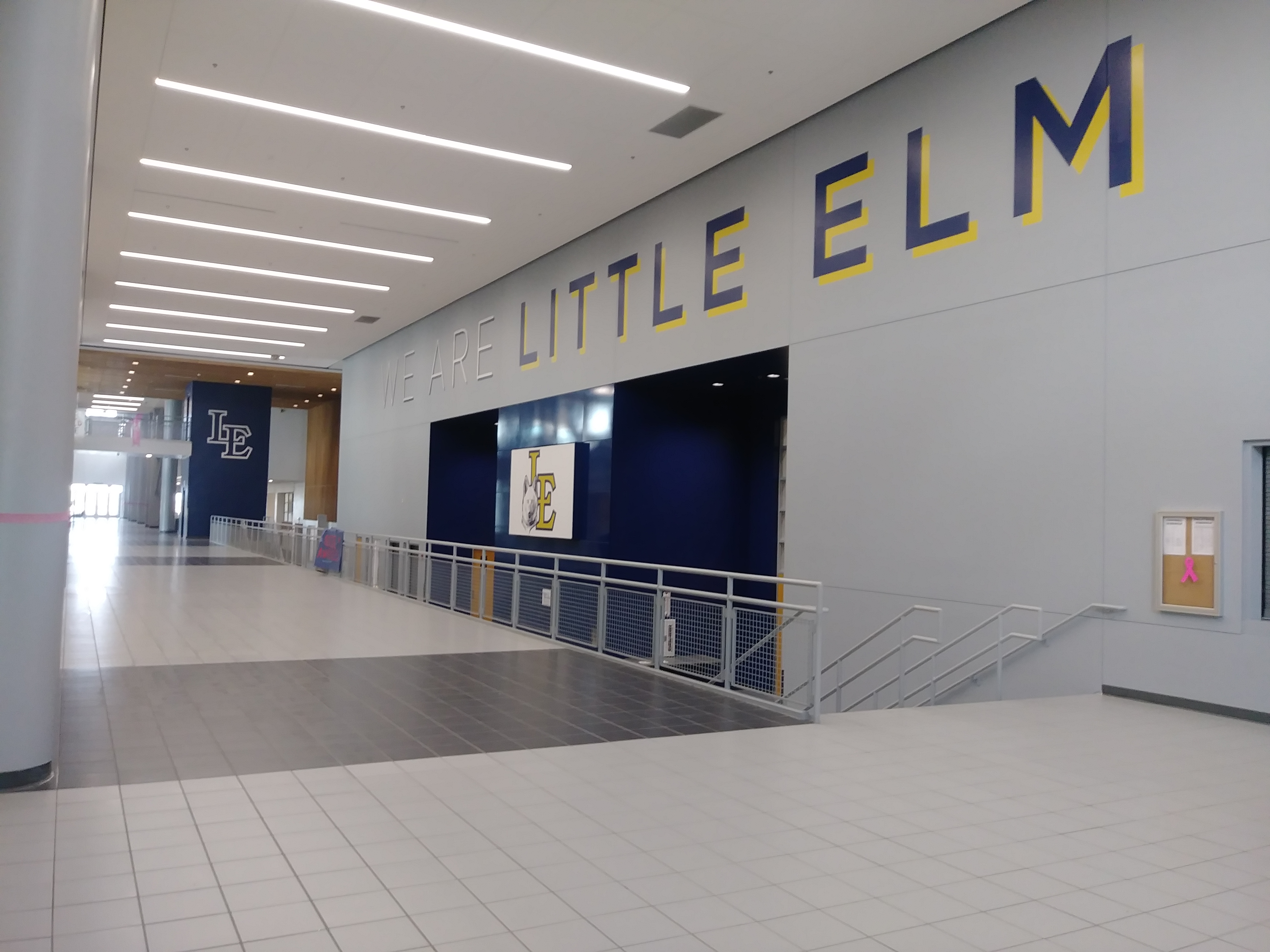
Little Elm High School Main Corridor, October 1, 2018

In 2015, the school was rated "Met Standard" by the Texas Education Agency.

UIL Number Sense Champions

- 1993(2A), 1994(2A)

== Athletics ==
The Little Elm Lobos compete in UIL district 5-6A in the following sports: Volleyball, Cross Country, Cheerleading, Drill Team, Marching Band, Football, Basketball, Power lifting, Soccer, Golf, Tennis, Track, Baseball, and Softball. Beginning with the 2020-21 school year, wrestling has been offered as an option.

UIL Basketball State Champions

- 2026 (6A-DII)

WGI Winterguard World Champions

- 2010 (Scholastic A)
- 2025 (Scholastic World)

== 2021 protest incident ==
On Friday, November 19, 2021, a walkout protest was held in response to a student claiming that she was sexually harassed by another student on a bus but was herself disciplined upon reporting the incident. Police were called to the scene when the students became disruptive and began making threats. In response to the increased disruption, officers used pepper spray and tasers on some students; four students were arrested for assaulting the police officers. The school district proceeded to host a "listening session" with parents and students to hear their concerns.

== Notable alumni ==
- Cole Beasley, American football player, Rapper
- R. J. Hampton, basketball Player
- John Mateer, college football quarterback for the Oklahoma Sooners
- Trevante Rhodes, American actor, former sprinter
- Richard Sánchez, soccer player with Major League Soccer
- Ryan Watts, cornerback for the Texas Longhorns
- Weston McKennie, American soccer player for the USMNT
