= Little Elm, Texas =

- City
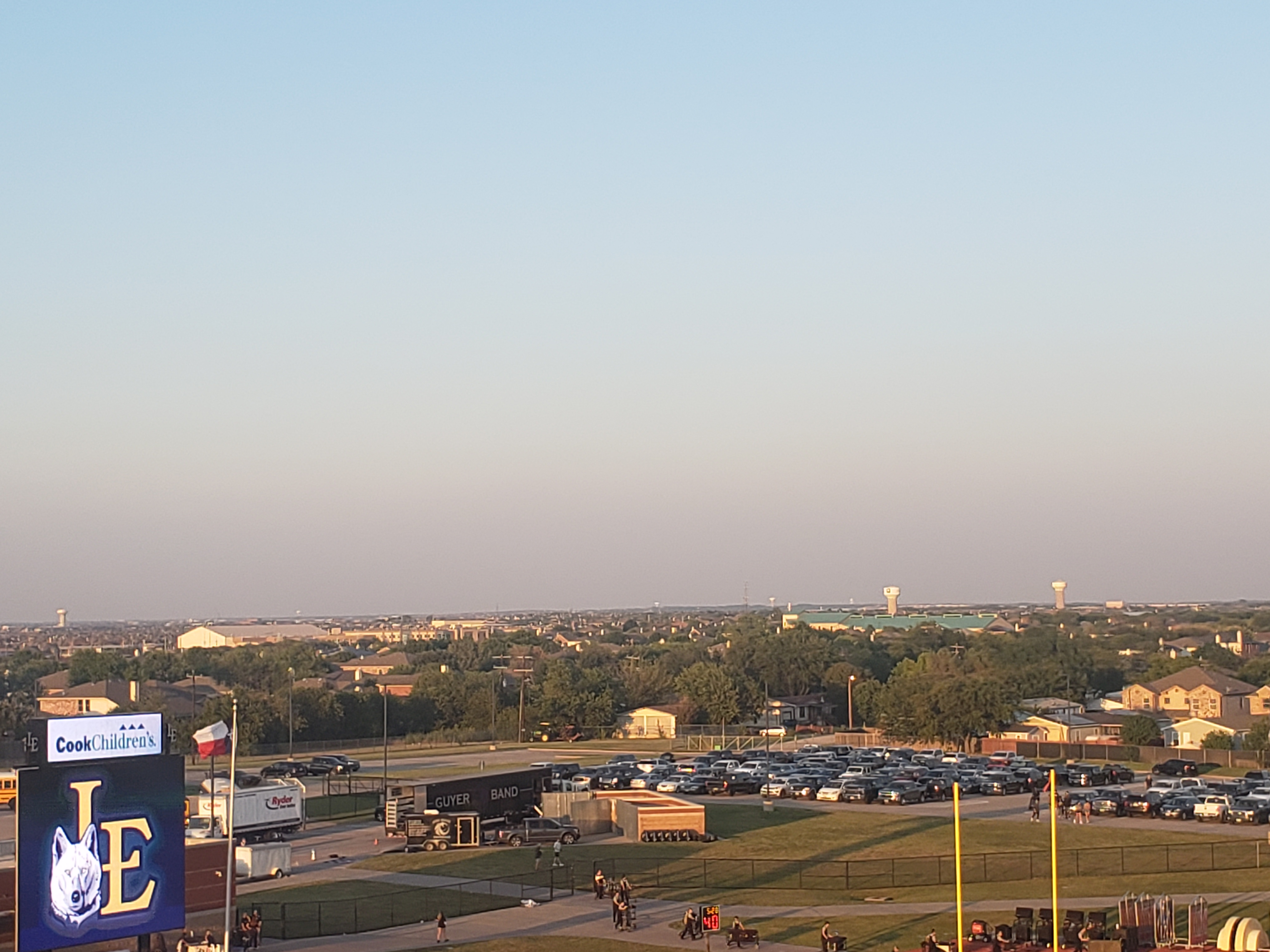
- The city's communities, Little Elm High School, and a local church.

- Logo
- Motto: "Town With A Lake Attitude"
- Location of Little Elm in Denton County, Texas
- Coordinates: 33°9′50″N 96°55′49″W
- Country: United States
- State: Texas
- County: Denton
- Established: 1844; 182 years ago

Government
  - Type: Council-Manager
  - City Council: Mayor

Area
  - Total: 22.09 sq mi (57.22 km^{2})
  - Land: 17.99 sq mi (46.60 km^{2})
  - Water: 4.10 sq mi (10.62 km^{2})
- Elevation: 515 ft (157 m)

Population (2020)
  - Total: 46,453
  - Estimate (2022): 55,357
  - Density: 2,102.6/sq mi (811.83/km^{2})
- Time zone: UTC-6 (Central (CST))
  - Summer (DST): UTC-5 (CDT)
- ZIP code: 75068
- Area codes: 214, 469, 945, 972
- FIPS code: 48-43012
- GNIS feature ID: 2410843
- Website: www.littleelm.gov

Little Elm is a city in Denton County, Texas, United States, and a part of the Dallas–Fort Worth metroplex. It is an extended suburb of Denton; its population was 46,453 as of the 2020 census. In 2000, the census population was at 3,646. By the 2010 census, the city total had jumped to 25,898, making Little Elm one of the fastest-growing municipalities by percentage in Texas since 2000. The July 1, 2022 census estimates Little Elm's population as 55,357.

== History ==
Little Elm was established along Lewisville Lake by C.C. "Kit" King, son of John and Delilah King, in 1844. King named the community after the creek banks where it was located. King helped organize mail service for the area and in 1852 was named the postmaster of Denton County's first post office. The population was very low throughout the first half of the 20th century, but in 1966, the community was able to officially incorporate. The first official census for the town came in 1970, which recorded 363 persons.

On March 2, 2023, a very powerful storm came through North Texas. It caused damages across the area but most notably, a supermarket's facade was completely torn off, covering several automobiles parked in the parking lot.

== Geography ==
Little Elm is generally located along the northern and eastern shores of Lewisville Lake.

According to the U.S. Census Bureau, it has a total area of 18.6 square miles (48.3 km^{2}), of which 4.1 square miles (10.5 km^{2}), or 21.83%, are covered by water. Little Elm has an average elevation of 545 feet above sea level.

=== Housing ===
The vast majority of Little Elm's residents reside in single family homes, usually in master-planned subdivisions built between the late 1990s and late 2010s. Because central Little Elm is surrounded on three sides by Lake Lewisville, apartments and townhomes have begun establishing themselves in the town's core as the need for denser, walkable housing has become more apparent. In The Lakefront district alone, there are more than 550 apartment units within walking distance to multiple restaurants, shops, and entertainment options, per Apartments.com analysis.

=== Climate ===
Little Elm has a humid subtropical climate (Cfa), typical for Northeast Texas.

Climate data for Little Elm, TX
Month	Jan	Feb	Mar	Apr	May	Jun	Jul	Aug	Sep	Oct	Nov	Dec	Year
Average precipitation inches	2.1	2.8	2.4	4.3	4.7	3	2.1	2	3	2.6	2.7	1.9	33.5
Average precipitation mm	53	71	61	110	120	76	53	51	76	66	69	48	850
Source: WeatherBase

== Demographics ==
Historical population
Census	Pop.	Note	%±
1880	116		—
1970	363		—
1980	926		155.1%
1990	1,255		35.5%
2000	3,646		190.5%
2010	25,898		610.3%
2020	46,453		79.4%
2023 (est.)	58,496		25.9%
U.S. Decennial Census; 2010 2020

Little Elm's build-out population is anticipated to be about 90,000.

=== Racial and ethnic composition ===
Little Elm city, Texas – Racial and ethnic composition Note: the US Census treats Hispanic/Latino as an ethnic category. This table excludes Latinos from the racial categories and assigns them to a separate category. Hispanics/Latinos may be of any race.
Race / Ethnicity (NH = Non-Hispanic)	Pop 2000	Pop 2010	Pop 2020	% 2000	% 2010	% 2020
White alone (NH)	2,597	14,326	19,422	71.23%	55.32%	41.81%
Black or African American alone (NH)	102	3,621	8,420	2.80%	13.98%	18.13%
Native American or Alaska Native alone (NH)	19	148	184	0.52%	0.57%	0.40%
Asian alone (NH)	27	885	4,511	0.74%	3.42%	9.71%
Native Hawaiian or Pacific Islander alone (NH)	2	12	27	0.05%	0.05%	20%
Other race alone (NH)	12	69	265	0.33%	0.27%	0.57%
Mixed race or Multiracial (NH)	50	609	2,407	1.37%	2.35%	5.18%
Hispanic or Latino (any race)	837	6,228	11,217	22.96%	24.05%	24.15%
Total	3,646	25,898	46,453	100.00%	100.00%	100.00%

=== 2020 census ===
As of the 2020 census, Little Elm had a population of 46,453. The median age was 33.3 years. 30.2% of residents were under the age of 18 and 6.7% of residents were 65 years of age or older. For every 100 females there were 94.6 males, and for every 100 females age 18 and over there were 89.8 males age 18 and over.

99.7% of residents lived in urban areas, while 0.3% lived in rural areas.

There were 15,572 households in Little Elm, of which 48.3% had children under the age of 18 living in them. Of all households, 56.8% were married-couple households, 13.5% were households with a male householder and no spouse or partner present, and 23.3% were households with a female householder and no spouse or partner present. About 18.4% of all households were made up of individuals and 4.2% had someone living alone who was 65 years of age or older.

There were 16,644 housing units, of which 6.4% were vacant. The homeowner vacancy rate was 2.5% and the rental vacancy rate was 10.3%.

Racial composition as of the 2020 census
Race	Number	Percent
White	21,890	47.1%
Black or African American	8,547	18.4%
American Indian and Alaska Native	423	0.9%
Asian	4,538	9.8%
Native Hawaiian and Other Pacific Islander	33	0.1%
Some other race	3,867	8.3%
Two or more races	7,155	15.4%
Hispanic or Latino (of any race)	11,217	24.1%

== Economy ==
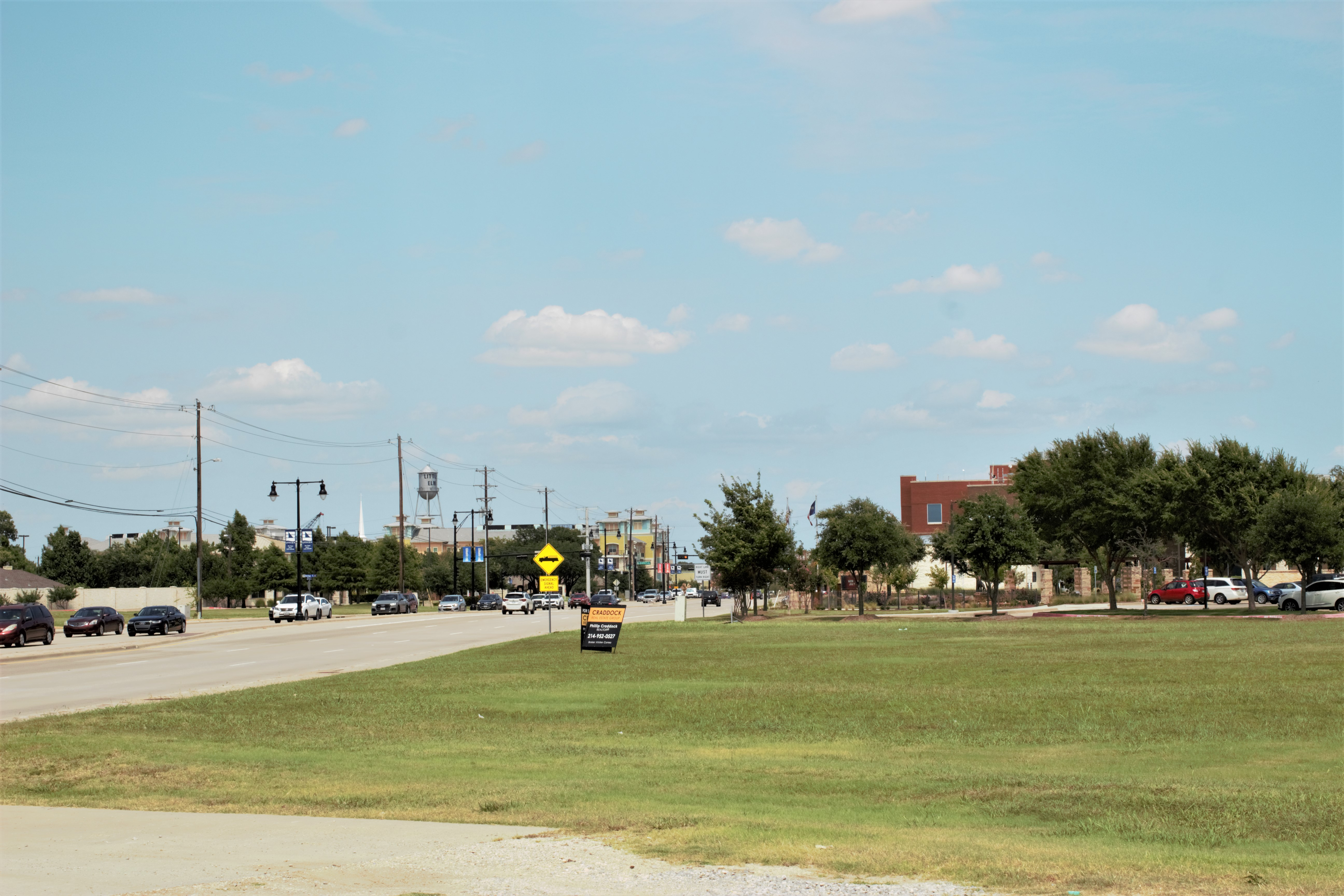
Near Beard Park in Little Elm, Texas.

While Little Elm is often referred to as a "bedroom community", five companies/entities in the city employ over 100 people, per the Little Elm EDC – Little Elm ISD (853), The Town of Little Elm (311), Kroger (191), Lowe's Home Center (178), and Retractable Technologies (146). The 2019 Retail Trade population was 203,560. The unemployment rate in Little Elm, pre-COVID-19, was 3.7%. Little Elm residents work in a variety of sectors, including retail trade (13.9%), finance/insurance (11.6%), professional/scientific/technical services (10.8%), construction (8.6%), and educational services (8.5%).

The original downtown area of Little Elm, commonly known as "The Lakefront", has seen much investment in recent years. Multiple restaurants and entertainment options have established themselves in the area near Eldorado and Main Street, and multiple middle to upper income apartment developments have been completed or are in planning/construction phases. This has created a localized densification effect in a desirable area of the city, a city which is otherwise known for its sprawl and single family zoning patterns.

== Parks and recreation ==
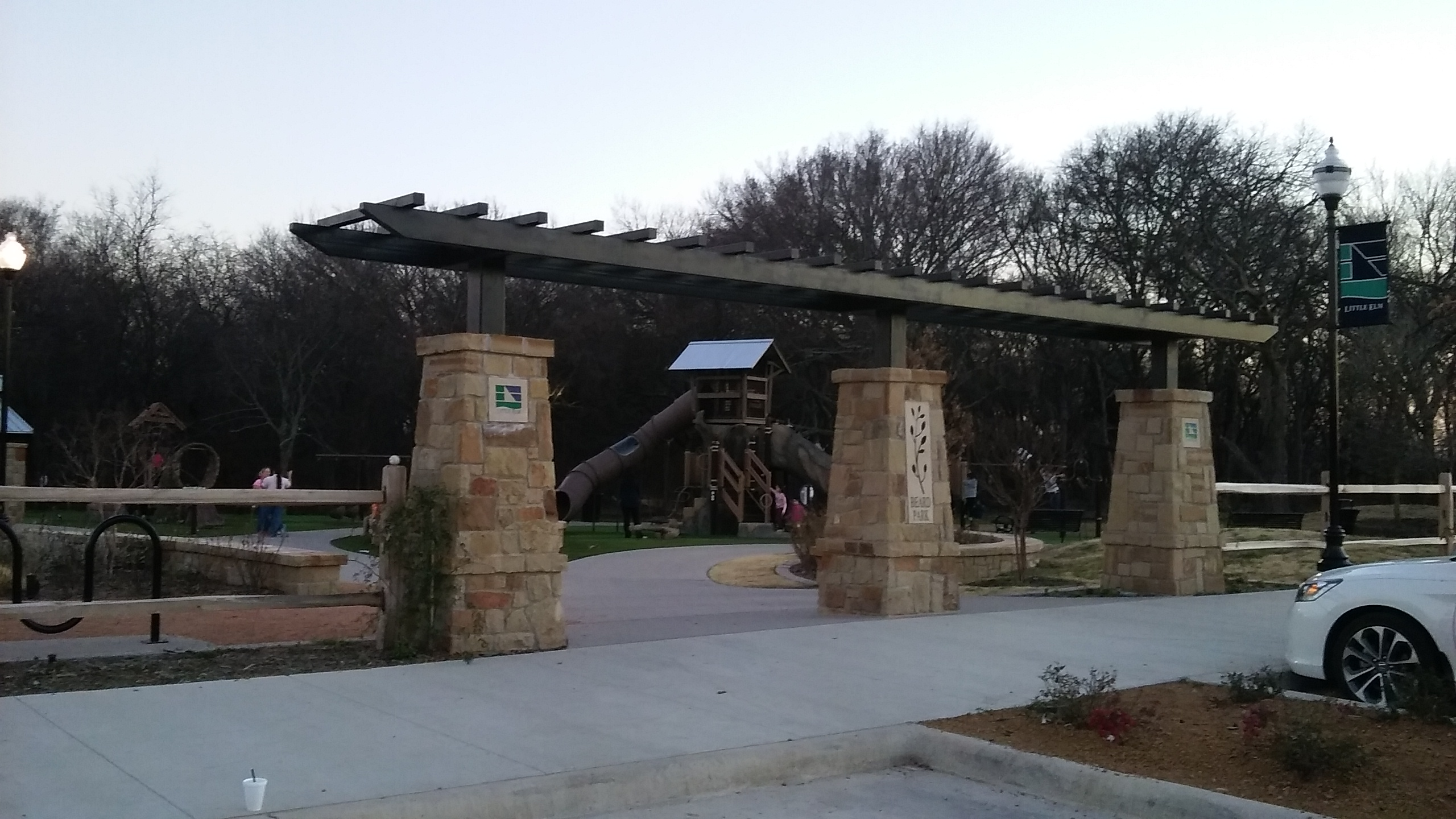
Entrance to Beard Park in Little Elm, Texas

Little Elm has five major community parks: Little Elm Park, Cottonwood Park, Beard Park, McCord Park, and Union Park. Cottonwood Park, located in the Lakefront district at the southern terminus of Lobo Lane, is home to Cottonwood Creek Marina.

McCord Park is a wooded, 38-acre park including trails, a disc golf course, a fishing dock, and a playground. The disc golf course was designed by John Houck.

== Government ==
=== Politics ===
Little Elm town vote by party in recent gubernatorial elections
Year	Democratic	Republican	Third Parties/Ind.
2022	50.49% 14,083	48.14% 13,427	1.36% 380
2018	43.97% 12,492	53.76% 15,271	2.26% 642

=== Local government ===
Little Elm became a home rule municipality in 2001. It has a council-manager form of government. The town council consists of a mayor and five city council members, one of whom is elected at-large.

The city holds annual municipal elections in March, and run-off elections when necessary in June. Terms for both the offices of the mayor and council are three years, with term limits of three years.

The city has a number of extraterritorial jurisdictions that also vote in municipal elections.

In June 2021, Little Elm elected its first African American mayor, Curtis Cornelious, who previously served two and a half terms on town council as the at-large council member before resigning to run for mayor. In 2025 Little Elm elected its first Hispanic councilmember, Idalia Maria Amaya.

=== State government ===
After the 2021 state and federal redistricting, the town of Little Elm is located almost wholly within Texas State House of Representatives district 57, with tiny portions in district 106. Likewise, most of Little Elm is in Texas State Senate district 12, with some small portions in district 30.

=== Federal government ===
Following the 2021 state and federal redistricting, the town of Little Elm is located entirely within United States Congressional district 26.

== Education ==
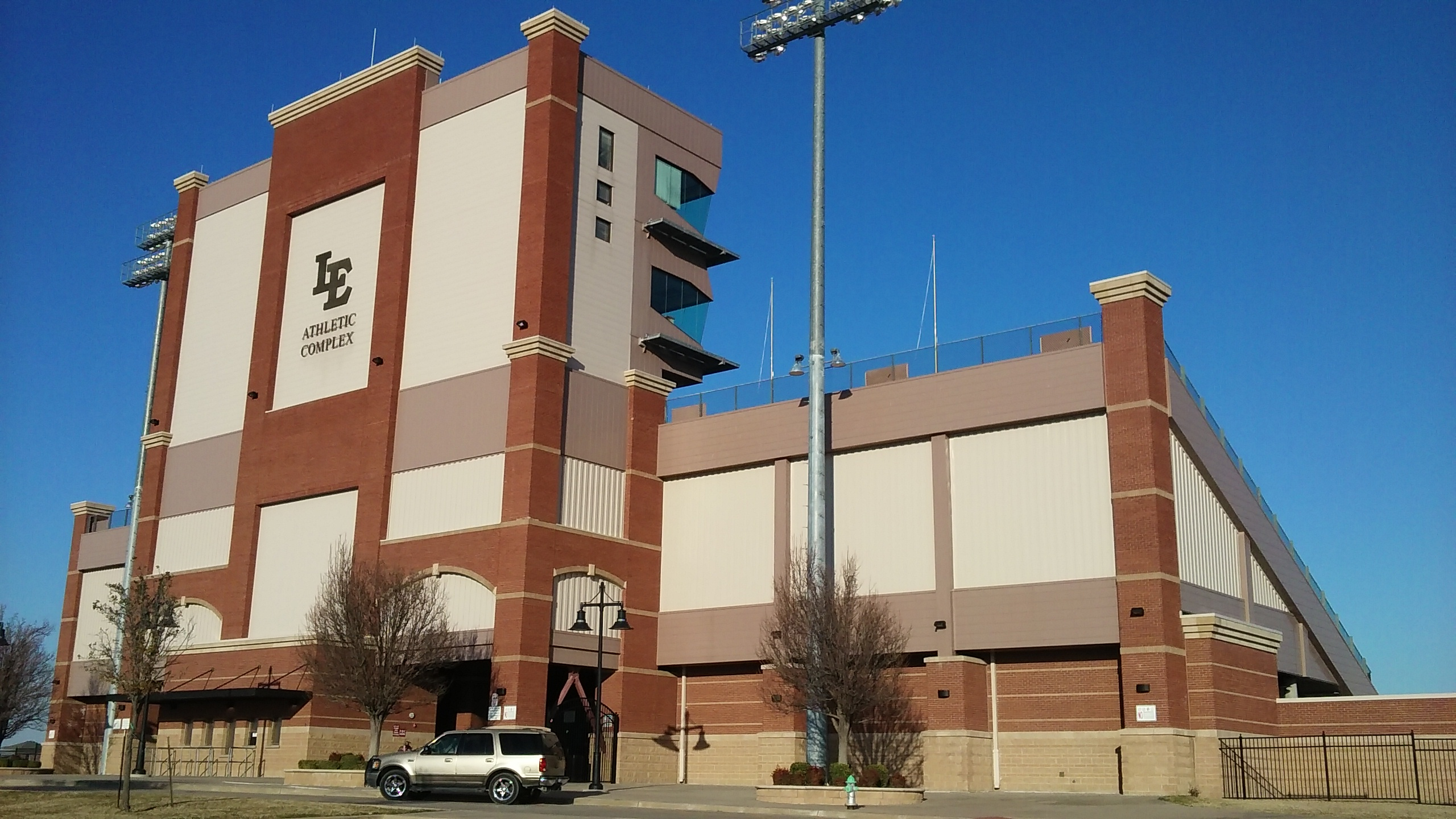
Little Elm ISD Athletic Complex Stadium in Little Elm, Texas

Four school districts primarily serve Little Elm: Little Elm ISD, Frisco ISD, Denton ISD, and Aubrey ISD.

The Little Elm Independent School District serves most of the original parts of Little Elm. Little Elm ISD is one of the fastest-growing in Denton County. The school district finished building its athletic stadium in 2006 located at the intersection of Hart Road and Eldorado Parkway. The stadium has a seating capacity of 7,500 with great wheelchair accessibility, a newly renovated video board at the north endzone, and a three level state-of-the-art press box. Although the intent is to keep the community a one-high-school town, two new middle schools opened for the 2020–2021 school year. Most of the city in LEISD goes to Walker Middle School, while small portions go to Strike Middle School.

A portion of the city is within the Frisco Independent School District. Robertson Elementary, which is in Little Elm, along with Stafford Middle School serve part of Sunset Pointe and Frisco Ranch; with other schools outside the city also serving small portions of the area. Lone Star High School also serves most of the city that is under Frisco ISD.

During the summer of 2016, Denton ISD completed construction on its fourth comprehensive high school, Braswell High School, located at the southeast corner of Navo Road and U.S. 380, to serve the fast-growing University Drive corridor, which is part of Little Elm. Along with Braswell, other Denton schools serve the northern area of the city. Navo Middle School and Union Park Elementary are located in the city; while Bell Elementary, Paloma Creek Elementary, Providence Elementary, and Rodriguez Middle School serve portions of Little Elm despite being out of the city's boundaries.

A small chunk of US 380, although uninhabited, is zoned to Prosper ISD.

== Infrastructure ==
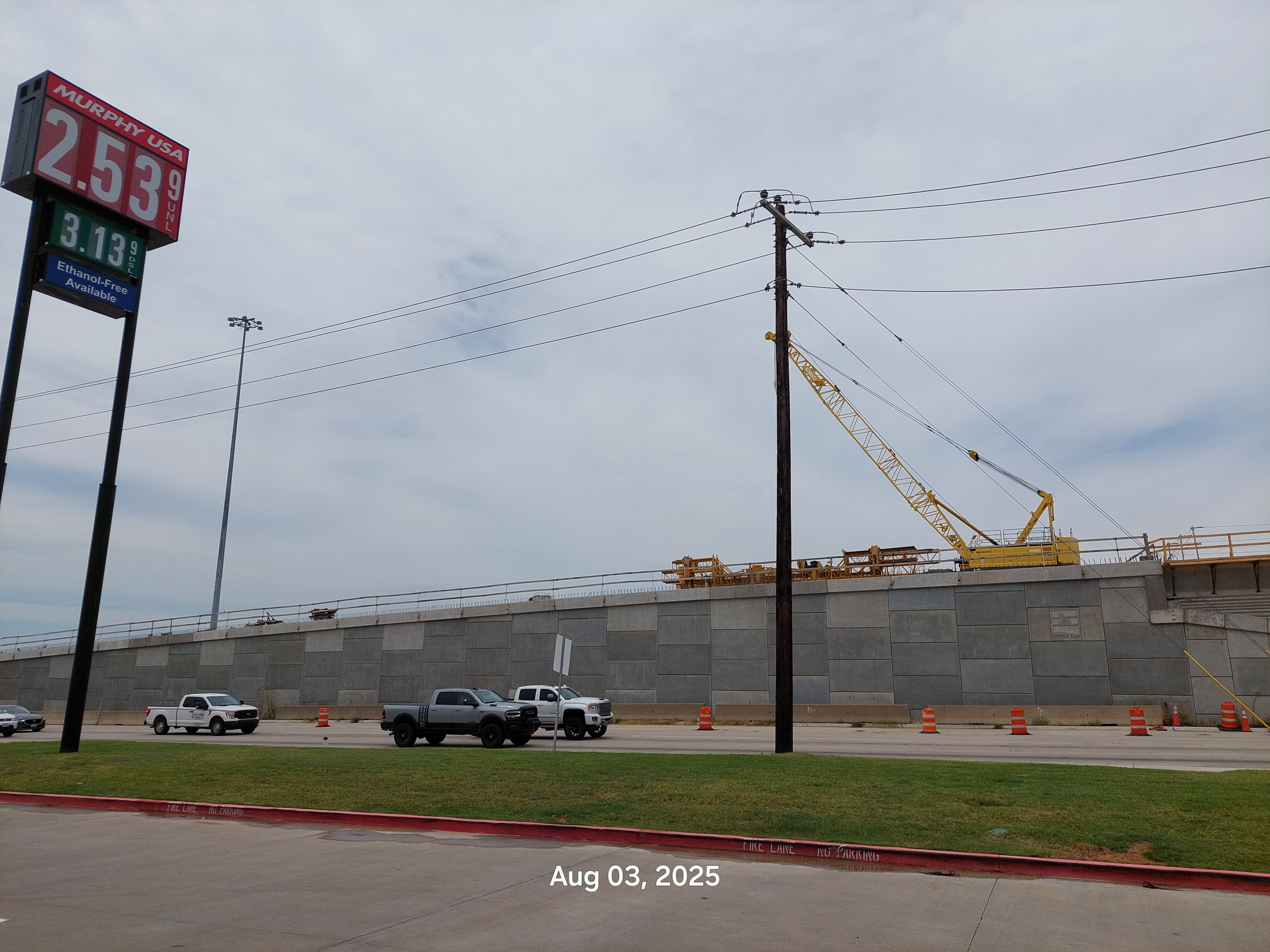
U.S. Route 380 intersection with FM 720 during construction of overpass in Little Elm, Texas.

Highways include:

- Eldorado Parkway
- FM 423
- FM 720
- Dallas North Tollway
- U.S. Route 380

== Notable people ==
- Cole Beasley, former American football player
- Curtis Cornelious, current and first African American mayor of Little Elm
- R. J. Hampton, basketball player for the Orlando Magic
- Weston McKennie, soccer player for Juventus and USMNT
- Ryan Watts, American football player for the Pittsburgh Steelers
- Marsai Martin, actress, famous for the movie Little and the TV show Black-ish
- John Mateer, American football quarterback for the Oklahoma Sooners
- Trevante Rhodes, American actor
- Lillian Salerno, Texas state Director for USDA Rural Development, and former Deputy Undersecretary for Rural Development
