= Michael Lewis =

American writer and journalist (born 1960)

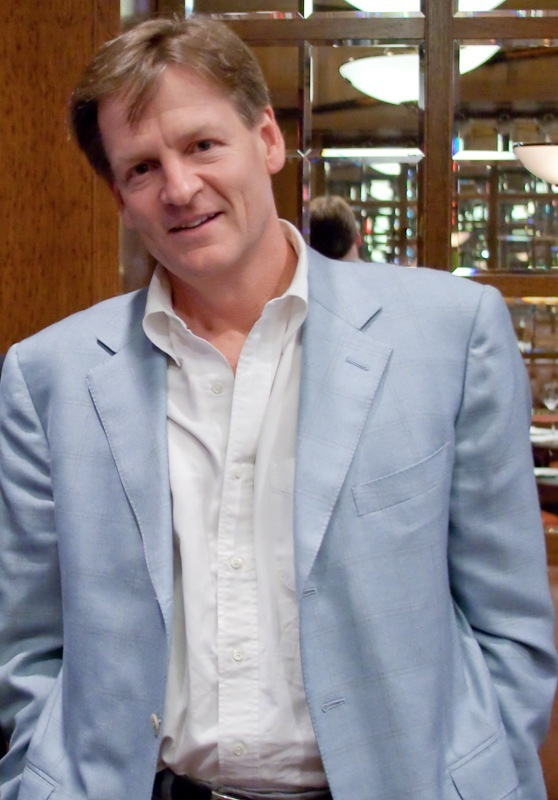
- Lewis in 2009
- Born: Michael Monroe Lewis; October 15, 1960 (age 66); New Orleans, Louisiana, U.S.
- Education: Princeton University (BA); London School of Economics (MSc)
- Occupations: Nonfiction writer, journalist
- Spouses: Diane deCordova Lewis (m. 1985) Kate Bohner (m. 1994) Tabitha Soren (m. 1997)
- Children: 3
- Writing career
- Period: 1989–present
- Notable works: Liar's Poker (1989); Moneyball (2003); The Blind Side (2006); The Big Short (2010)
- Website: michaellewiswrites.com

Michael Monroe Lewis is an American author and financial journalist. From 2009 to 2026, he was a contributing editor to Vanity Fair, writing mostly on business, finance, and economics. He is known for his nonfiction work, particularly his coverage of financial crises and behavioral finance.

Lewis was born in New Orleans and attended Princeton University, from which he graduated with a degree in art history. After attending the London School of Economics, he began a career on Wall Street during the 1980s as a bond salesman at Salomon Brothers. The experience prompted him to write his first book, Liar's Poker (1989). Fourteen years later, Lewis wrote Moneyball: The Art of Winning an Unfair Game (2003), in which he investigated the success of the Oakland Athletics of Major League Baseball and their general manager Billy Beane. His 2006 book The Blind Side: Evolution of a Game was his first to be adapted into a film, The Blind Side (2009). In 2010, he released The Big Short: Inside the Doomsday Machine. The film adaptation of Moneyball was released in 2011, followed by The Big Short in 2015.

Lewis's books have won two Los Angeles Times Book Prizes and several have reached number one on The New York Times Best Seller list, including Going Infinite (2023).

== Early life ==
Lewis was born in New Orleans, the son of corporate attorney J. Thomas Lewis and community activist Diana Monroe Lewis. He is a descendant of the early-19th-century Louisiana judge Joshua Lewis. He went to Isidore Newman School. He later attended Princeton University and graduated cum laude with a BA in art and archaeology in 1982 after completing a 166-page senior thesis titled "Donatello and the Antique." At Princeton, Lewis was a member of the Ivy Club. He briefly worked with New York City art dealer Daniel Wildenstein. In an interview with Charlie Rose, Lewis said that his initial ambition was to become an art historian, but he was quickly dissuaded once he realized that there would be no jobs available for art historians and that even the handful that existed did not pay well.

Lewis subsequently enrolled at the London School of Economics and received an MSc(Econ) in economics in 1985. He was hired by Salomon Brothers, stayed for a while in New York City for its training program, and then relocated to London, where he worked at its London office as a bond salesman for a few years. He has said that the journalism from this era found in The Economist and The Wall Street Journal inspired him to explore becoming a writer.

== Career ==
=== Writing ===
Lewis described his experiences at Salomon and the evolution of the mortgage-backed bond in Liar's Poker (1989). In The New New Thing (1999), he investigated the then-booming Silicon Valley and the obsession with innovation. Four years later, Lewis wrote Moneyball (2003), in which he investigated the success of Billy Beane and the Oakland Athletics. In August 2007, he wrote an article about catastrophe bonds, "In Nature's Casino", that ran in The New York Times Magazine.

Lewis has worked for The Spectator and The New York Times Magazine, as a columnist for Bloomberg, as a senior editor and campaign correspondent to The New Republic, and as a visiting fellow at the University of California, Berkeley. He wrote the Dad Again column for Slate. Lewis worked for Conde Nast Portfolio but in February 2009 left to join Vanity Fair, where he became a contributing editor.

In September 2011, after the successful release of the film adaptation of Moneyball, it was reported that Lewis planned to take on "a much more active role in the what could be the next film based on one of his books" and would start writing a script for a Liar's Poker film.

During 2013 in Vanity Fair, Lewis wrote on the injustice of the prosecution of ex-Goldman Sachs programmer Sergey Aleynikov, who is given an entire chapter in Flash Boys. Flash Boys, which looked at high-frequency trading of Wall Street and other markets, was released in March 2014.

Lewis's 2015 Vanity Fair article "How Tom Wolfe Became ... Tom Wolfe", about the journalist and writer Tom Wolfe, became the basis for the documentary film Radical Wolfe, directed by Richard Dewey and released in 2023.

In 2016, Lewis published The Undoing Project, chronicling the close academic collaboration and personal relationship between Israeli psychologists Amos Tversky and Daniel Kahneman. The duo found systemic errors in human judgment under uncertainty, with implications for models of decision-making in fields such as economics, medicine, and sports.

In 2017, Lewis wrote a series of articles for Vanity Fair in which he described the Trump administration's approach to various federal agencies, including the Department of Energy and the Department of Agriculture. His articles described a sense of incredulity and disillusionment from career civil servants, particularly because of the Trump administration's lack of attention to some of their work, and the lack of care, knowledge, experience, and respect from Trump political appointees.

That material was incorporated into Lewis's book The Fifth Risk, which was on the New York Times nonfiction best-seller list for 14 weeks, and described the disconnect between the Obama administration's well-prepared transition plans and the incoming Trump administration's apparent lack of concern. Along with Energy and Agriculture, this book added Commerce among the main departments described.

In 2018, Lewis wrote and narrated The Coming Storm for Audible Studios, which released the short nonfiction story as part of its new Audible Originals series of audiobooks.

In May 2021, Lewis published The Premonition: A Pandemic Story, an account of physicians and public health officials who had warned of the danger of a pandemic, and of the United States government's response to COVID-19.

In 2023, Lewis wrote Going Infinite, about the cryptocurrency exchange FTX, its CEO, Sam Bankman-Fried, and what came to be the collapse of FTX.

In 2024, Lewis edited a series of profiles of federal employees for The Washington Post, written by himself and six other authors, including Dave Eggers, Geraldine Brooks, and Sarah Vowell. The series was published in book form in March 2025 as Who Is Government? The Untold Story of Public Service.

His book Blockers: Rebels in the Deep State, published in October 2026, profiles seven federal employees affected by the Department of Government Efficiency during the second presidency of Donald Trump.

=== Broadcasting and podcasts ===
Lewis's podcast, Against the Rules, first aired on April 2, 2019. The first season comprised seven episodes, each taking on a different aspect of society addressing the concept of fairness "in realms ranging from art authentication to consumer finance". The show often refers to the growing social distrust for authority, and refers to different types of public officials as "referees." Against the Rules is produced by Pushkin Industries, the media company founded by journalist Malcolm Gladwell and former Slate executive Jacob Weisberg. In 2023, the podcast ran a series titled Judging Sam, covering the trial of Sam Bankman-Fried. A season released in 2024 examined the legalization of sports betting in the United States.

On January 12, 2020, Lewis appeared as one of the castaways on BBC Radio 4's Desert Island Discs.

== Reception ==
In a review of Moneyball, Dan Ackman of Forbes said that Lewis had a special talent: "He can walk into an area already mined by hundreds of writers and find gems there all along but somehow missed by his predecessors". A New York Times piece said that "no one writes with more narrative panache about money and finance than Mr. Lewis", praising his ability to use his subject's stories to show the problems with the systems around them.

Critics from outside the financial industry have criticized Lewis for inaccuracies in his writing. In a 2011 column in The Atlantic, American journalist and sports author Allen Barra took issue with Lewis's characterization of Major League Baseball in Moneyball, writing, "From a historical standpoint, Lewis is, well, way off base. By the end of the 20th century baseball had achieved a greater level of competitive balance than at any time in the game's history... Moneyball doesn't just get the state of present-day baseball wrong; it also misrepresents the history of the sport."

Lewis's Flash Boys: A Wall Street Revolt ignited a new round of controversy surrounding high-frequency trading. At a House Financial Services Committee hearing in April 2014, Mary Jo White, a former Wall Street insider (as a Debevoise & Plimpton lawyer primarily for Wall Street financial firms) who later served as the U.S. Securities and Exchange Commission (SEC) Chair, denied the book's premise, saying, "The markets are not rigged". In June 2014, White announced that the SEC would undergo a new round of regulatory review in response to concerns about dark pools and market structure. In June 2016, the SEC approved IEX, the trading venue founded by the book's central figures, as a national securities exchange.

Book critics widely praised Lewis's The Undoing Project, with Glenn C. Altschuler writing in the Pittsburgh Post-Gazette that it "may well be his best book".

In August 2023, Michael Oher, the subject of The Blind Side, petitioned a Tennessee court to end a conservatorship held by Sean and Leigh Anne Tuohy, alleging that they had profited from his story; the Tuohys denied the allegations. Lewis told The Washington Post that the film studio had paid $250,000 for the option on the book, which he split with the Tuohy family. A judge ended the conservatorship in September 2023.

His 2023 book Going Infinite, an intimate account of Sam Bankman-Fried and his firm FTX, was written while FTX was collapsing and published the day Bankman-Fried's trial on charges of fraud and money laundering began. Lewis was criticized for giving Bankman-Fried's explanations for FTX's losses excessive deference, with journalist Michael Hiltzik calling the Bankman-Fried hype a "torrent of nonsense". The New York Times wrote of Lewis's extensive access to Bankman-Fried that he had "a front-row seat—from which he could apparently see nothing." Others praised Lewis's storytelling, with The New Yorker calling the book "stupefyingly pleasurable" to read and filling "many gaps" in the story, ultimately predicting that the book "may one day be regarded as either the pinnacle or the nadir of his career".

== Personal life ==
Lewis has been married three times. He married his first wife, Diane deCordova Lewis, in 1985. His second marriage was to former CNBC correspondent Kate Bohner; they got engaged three weeks after their first date. In October 1997, he married former MTV reporter Tabitha Soren. Lewis and Soren had three children. In May 2021, their daughter Dixie, aged 19, was killed in a head-on collision near Truckee, California.

Lewis and Soren live in the Oakland Hills above Berkeley, California. Lewis is an atheist.

== Awards and recognition ==
- 2008 Gerald Loeb Award Honorable Mention for Magazines for "In Nature's Casino"
- 2009 Gerald Loeb Award for Feature Writing for "The End"
- 2010 Gerald Loeb Award for Feature Writing for "Wall Street on the Tundra"
- 2010 Los Angeles Times Book Prize (Current Interest) for The Big Short
- 2011 Robert F. Kennedy Book Award for The Big Short
- 2023 elected member to American Academy of Arts & Sciences

== Works ==
- Liar's Poker: Rising through the Wreckage on Wall Street. New York: W. W. Norton & Company. 1989. ISBN 0-393-02750-3.
- Pacific Rift: The Story of the Epic Culture Clash Between Japan and the USA - Why Americans and Japanese Don't Understand Each Other. Knoxville, Tennessee: Whittle Direct Books. 1991. ISBN 0-9624745-6-8 – via archive.org.
- The Money Culture. New York: W. W. Norton & Company. 1991. ISBN 0-393-03037-7 – via archive.org.

A collection of Lewis's journalism.

- Trail Fever. New York: A. A. Knopf. 1997. ISBN 0-679-44660-5.
- The New New Thing: A Silicon Valley Story. New York: W. W. Norton & Company. 1999. ISBN 0-393-04813-6.
- Next: The Future Just Happened. New York: W. W. Norton & Company. 2001. ISBN 0-393-02037-1.
- Moneyball: The Art of Winning an Unfair Game. New York: W. W. Norton & Company. 2003. ISBN 0-393-05765-8.
- Coach: Lessons on the Game of Life. New York: W. W. Norton & Company. 2005. ISBN 0-393-06091-8.
- The Blind Side: Evolution of a Game. New York: W. W. Norton & Company. 2006. ISBN 0-393-06123-X.
- Lewis, Michael, ed. (2008). The Real Price of Everything: Rediscovering the Six Classics of Economics. New York: Sterling. ISBN 978-1-4027-4790-8.
- Home Game: An Accidental Guide to Fatherhood. New York: W. W. Norton & Company. 2009. ISBN 978-0-393-06901-3.
- Lewis, Michael, ed. (2009). Panic: The Story of Modern Financial Insanity. New York: W. W. Norton & Company. ISBN 978-0-393-06514-5.
- The Big Short: Inside the Doomsday Machine. New York: W. W. Norton & Company. 2010. ISBN 978-0-393-07223-5.
- Boomerang: Travels in the New Third World. New York: W. W. Norton & Company. 2011. ISBN 978-0-393-08181-7.
- Flash Boys: A Wall Street Revolt. New York: W. W. Norton & Company. 2014. ISBN 978-0-393-24466-3.
- The Undoing Project: A Friendship that Changed Our Minds. New York: W. W. Norton & Company. 2017. ISBN 978-0-393-25459-4.
- The Coming Storm (Audiobook ed.). Audible Studios. 2018.

Text is included with The Fifth Risk: Undoing Democracy

- The Fifth Risk: Undoing Democracy. New York: W. W. Norton & Company. 2018. ISBN 978-1-324-00264-2.
- Playing to Win. New York: Audible. 2020. ASIN B08DL7ZJDX.
- The Premonition: A Pandemic Story. New York: W. W. Norton & Company. 2021. ISBN 978-0393881554.
- Going Infinite: The Rise and Fall of a New Tycoon. New York: W. W. Norton & Company. 2023. ISBN 978-1-324-07433-5.
- Lewis, Michael, ed. (2025). Who Is Government?: The Untold Story of Public Service. Penguin Group. ISBN 979-8217047802.
- Blockers: Rebels in the Deep State. New York: W. W. Norton & Company. 2026. ISBN 978-1-324-13165-6.

== See also ==
- 2020 United States Census, issues addressed in The Fifth Risk
