= List of Late Night with Conan O'Brien episodes (season 9) =

This is a list of episodes for Season 9 of Late Night with Conan O'Brien, which aired from September 4, 2001, to August 16, 2002.

== Series overview ==
Season	Episodes	Originally aired	
Season	Episodes	First aired	Last aired
1	230	September 13, 1993	September 9, 1994
2	229	September 12, 1994	September 8, 1995
3	195	September 11, 1995	September 13, 1996
4	162	September 17, 1996	August 22, 1997
5	170	September 9, 1997	August 28, 1998
6	160	September 15, 1998	August 20, 1999
7	153	September 7, 1999	August 18, 2000
8	145	September 5, 2000	August 17, 2001
9	160	September 4, 2001	August 16, 2002
10	160	September 3, 2002	August 15, 2003
11	153	September 3, 2003	August 13, 2004
12	166	August 31, 2004	August 19, 2005
13	162	September 6, 2005	August 30, 2006
14	195	September 5, 2006	August 31, 2007
15	163	September 4, 2007	August 29, 2008
16	98	September 2, 2008	February 20, 2009

== Season 9 ==
No.	Original release date	Guest(s)	Musical/entertainment guest(s)
1469	September 4, 2001	Jamie Foxx, Mena Suvari	Bill Wyman
1470	September 5, 2001	The Rock, Vivica A. Fox	BR549
1471	September 6, 2001	Tom Selleck, Anne Heche, Greg Giraldo	N/A
1472	September 7, 2001	Topher Grace	They Might Be Giants
1473	September 18, 2001	Steve Kroft, Sarah Vowell	Joshua Bell
1474	September 19, 2001	Carson Daly, Frank McCourt	Jay Farrar
1475	September 20, 2001	Tom Selleck, Mike Lupica	The Black Crowes
1476	September 21, 2001	Jeff Greenfield, Ana Gasteyer	Fountains of Wayne
1477	September 24, 2001	Al Roker, John Lithgow	Toots and the Maytals
1478	September 25, 2001	Rosie O'Donnell, Breckin Meyer	Ray Davies
1479	September 26, 2001	George Stephanopoulos, Rob Schneider	David Byrne
1480	September 27, 2001	Kelsey Grammer, Craig Ferguson	Robert Earl Keen
1481	September 28, 2001	Michael Imperioli, Dana Delany, David Rakoff	N/A
1482	October 1, 2001	Jay Mohr, Joan Cusack	Jude
1483	October 2, 2001	Ethan Hawke, Courtney Thorne-Smith, Nick Lowe	N/A
1484	October 3, 2001	Tom Brokaw, Jarod Miller, Jake Johannsen	N/A
1485	October 4, 2001	Will Ferrell, Jeremy Piven, Remy Zero	N/A
1486	October 5, 2001	John Leguizamo, Leelee Sobieski,	N/A
1487	October 9, 2001	Lorraine Bracco, Snoop Dogg, Martina McBride	N/A
1488	October 10, 2001	Molly Shannon, Bill Bellamy, Loudon Wainwright	N/A
1489	October 11, 2001	Chris Kattan, Lance Bass, Sean Conroy	N/A
1490	October 12, 2001	Steve Harvey, Emeril Lagasse, Tenacious D	Tenacious D
1491	October 16, 2001	Tom Cavanagh, William H. Macy, Rob Siegel	N/A
1492	October 17, 2001	Shannon Elizabeth, Ice-T, Sugar Ray	N/A
1493	October 18, 2001	Quincy Jones, Marc Maron, Diana Krall	N/A
1494	October 19, 2001	Steve Zahn, Spike Lee,	N/A
1495	October 30, 2001	Jana Marie Hupp, Jimmy Blaylock	N/A
1496	October 31, 2001	D. L. Hughley, Eddie Cibrian, Greg Giraldo	N/A
1497	November 1, 2001	John Stamos, Tina Fey, The Strokes	N/A
1498	November 2, 2001	David Spade, Peter Gallagher, Los Straitjackets	N/A
1499	November 6, 2001	Carson Daly, Anne Robinson, Paul K. Tomplins	N/A
1500	November 7, 2001	Jack Black, Mariska Hargitay	Sevendust
1501	November 8, 2001	Gwyneth Paltrow, Zach Braff, Regena Thomashauer	N/A
1502	November 9, 2001	Matthew Broderick, Rachel Weisz, John Mayer	N/A
1503	November 13, 2001	Martin Lawrence, William Shatner, Dilated Peoples	N/A
1504	November 14, 2001	Heidi Klum, Robbie Coltrane, Malachy McCourt	N/A
1505	November 15, 2001	Ted Danson, Craig Bierko, Oysterhead	N/A
1506	November 16, 2001	Billy Bob Thornton, Jennifer Garner, Leo Allen	N/A
1507	November 20, 2001	Edward Burns, Patton Oswalt, Ravi Shankar	N/A
1508	November 21, 2001	Jill Hennessy, Zach Galifianakis,	N/A
1509	November 22, 2001	Janeane Garofalo, Paul Rudd, Ben Folds	N/A
1510	November 23, 2001	Ashton Kutcher, Doris Roberts, Jewel	N/A
1511	November 27, 2001	Tim Robbins, Jerry Stiller, Goldfrapp	N/A
1512	November 28, 2001	Jim Belushi, Mike Lupica,	N/A
1513	November 29, 2001	Martha Stewart, Matthew Modine, Blink 182	N/A
1514	November 30, 2001	Dave Chappelle, Artie Lange, Dr. John	N/A
1515	December 11, 2001	Jarod Miller, Lesley Boone, Starsailor	N/A
1516	December 12, 2001	Elijah Wood, Rosario Dawson, Tony Bennett	N/A
1517	December 13, 2001	Benjamin Bratt, Jaime Pressly, Lewis Black	N/A
1518	December 14, 2001	Al Franken, Natasha Lyonne, Louis C.K.	N/A
1519	December 18, 2001	Gary Sinise, Patrick Warburton, Jimmy Eat World	N/A
1520	December 19, 2001	Hugh Jackman, Dr. Ruth, Todd Barry	N/A
1521	December 20, 2001	Tom Brokaw, David Cross, Natalie Merchant	N/A
1522	December 21, 2001	Darrell Hammond, Luke Wilson, Puddle of Mudd	N/A
1523	December 26, 2001	Al Roker, Vincent D'Onofrio, Boris Hamilton	N/A
1524	December 27, 2001	Kevin Pollak, Tom Everett Scott, Raul Malo	N/A
1525	December 28, 2001	Patrick Stewart, Marc Maron	Ivy
1526	December 31, 2001	Caroline Rhea, Rich Hall	N/A
1527	January 2, 2002	Steven Wright, Jesse L. Martin, Jim Short	N/A
1528	January 3, 2002	Kevin Spacey, Jennifer Connelly, David Remnick	N/A
1529	January 4, 2002	Carson Daly, Clem Snide,	N/A
1530	January 7, 2002	Halle Berry, Ryan Phillippe, Jud Hale	N/A
1531	January 8, 2002	Billy Bob Thornton, Maya Rudolph, The Calling	N/A
1532	January 9, 2002	Sir Ian McKellen, Chris Matthews, Saves the Day	N/A
1533	January 10, 2002	Jon Voight, Colin Hanks,	N/A
1534	January 22, 2002	Denis Leary, Selma Blair, Robert Schimmel	N/A
1535	January 23, 2002	Nathan Lane, John Miller, Shannon McNally	N/A
1536	January 24, 2002	Laura Prepon, Rachel Dratch, Todd Solondz	N/A
1537	January 25, 2002	George Foreman, Ben Chaplin, Baaba Maal	N/A
1538	January 29, 2002	Ray Liotta, Amy Poehler, Bad Religion	N/A
1539	January 30, 2002	Al Franken, Christopher Meloni, Andy Blitz	N/A
1540	January 31, 2002	Pamela Anderson, Jason Schwartzman, Jewel	N/A
1541	February 1, 2002	D. L. Hughley, Brian Posehn, Craig David	N/A
1542	February 5, 2002	Roseanne, Jamie Kennedy, Dave Attell	N/A
1543	February 6, 2002	Ana Gasteyer, Tom Bergeron, The B-52's	N/A
1544	February 7, 2002	Rebecca Romijn, Dulé Hill, Gene Simmons	N/A
1545	February 8, 2002	Adam Vinatieri, Mark-Paul Gosselaar, The Blind Boys Of Alabama	N/A
1546	February 26, 2002	Josh Hartnett, Bob Balaban, Greg Behrendt	N/A
1547	February 27, 2002	Paula Zahn, Dashboard Confessional,	N/A
1548	February 28, 2002	Luke Perry, Mike Epps, James Lipton	N/A
1549	March 1, 2002	John Mcenroe, Lauren Graham, Jaguares	N/A
1550	March 5, 2002	Julia Louis-Dreyfus, Kevin Pollak, Vanessa Carlton	N/A
1551	March 6, 2002	Jeremy Irons, Marc Maron, David Feldman	N/A
1552	March 7, 2002	Tom Arnold, Roger Ebert, Doris Wishman	N/A
1553	March 8, 2002	Marisa Tomei, Sarah Paulson	Brandy
1554	March 12, 2002	Ice-T, John Tesh, Phantom Planet	N/A
1555	March 13, 2002	Harry Connick, Jr., Triple H	N/A
1556	March 14, 2002	William Shatner, Owen O'Neill	N/A
1557	March 15, 2002	Andy Richter, Reverend Horton Heat, Helen Mirren	N/A
1558	March 26, 2002	Tom Green, Seth Green, Jordan Rubin	N/A
1559	March 27, 2002	French Stewart	Aretha Franklin
1560	March 28, 2002	Darrell Hammond, Rachel Griffiths, Harry Shearer	N/A
1561	March 29, 2002	Janeane Garofalo, Harland Williams	Candy Butchers
1562	April 2, 2002	John Lithgow, Ryan Reynolds	N/A
1563	April 3, 2002	Scott Thompson, Tara Reid,	N/A
1564	April 4, 2002	Tony Danza, Dr. Michael Baden, Jim Breuer	N/A
1565	April 5, 2002	Andie MacDowell, Tracy Morgan	Cracker
1566	April 9, 2002	Bob Costas, Eugene Levy	Billy Bragg
1567	April 10, 2002	Martin Short, Rhys Ifans	Patty Griffin
1568	April 11, 2002	John Leguizamo, Christina Applegate	Regena Thomashauer
1569	April 12, 2002	Samuel L. Jackson, Ben Chaplin	Alanis Morissette
1570	April 16, 2002	Mira Sorvino, Senator Bob Dole	Beulah
1571	April 17, 2002	Ethan Hawke, Dave Chappelle, Anthony Bourdain	N/A
1572	April 18, 2002	Tim Robbins	Ben Kweller
1573	April 19, 2002	The Rock, Stone Phillips	No Doubt
1574	April 23, 2002	Topher Grace, Stephen Dorff	Super Furry Animals
1575	April 24, 2002	Richard Dreyfuss, Jamie Kennedy, Randy Cohen,	N/A
1576	April 25, 2002	Ted Danson, Alex Kingston, Zach Galifianakis	N/A
1577	April 26, 2002	Alan Cumming, Kelly Hu, Belle & Sebastian	N/A
1578	April 30, 2002	Al Franken, Christa Miller, Nappy Roots	N/A
1579	May 1, 2002	Charlie Sheen, Sarah Silverman, Christy McWilson,	N/A
1580	May 2, 2002	Debra Messing, Patton Oswalt, Sarah Vowell,	N/A
1581	May 3, 2002	Megan Mullally, Miguel Ferrer, Nick Cave & The Bad Seeds	N/A
1582	May 7, 2002	Tina Fey, Corbin Bernsen, The Dirty Dozen Brass Band	N/A
1583	May 8, 2002	Larry King, DJ Qualls,	N/A
1584	May 9, 2002	Kirsten Dunst, Zach Braff, Greg Giraldo	N/A
1585	May 10, 2002	Frankie Muniz, John C. McGinley,	N/A
1586	May 14, 2002	Robin Williams, Josh Jackson,	N/A
1587	May 15, 2002	Sean Combs, Charlotte Ross,	N/A
1588	May 16, 2002	Rosie O'Donnell, Jill Hennessy,	N/A
1589	May 17, 2002	Will Ferrell, Allison Janney, The Strokes	N/A
1590	May 21, 2002	Juliette Lewis, Eddie Griffin, The Breeders	N/A
1591	May 22, 2002	Bridget Moynahan, Matt Walsh,	N/A
1592	May 23, 2002	Kathleen Turner, Billy Campbell, Rubyhorse	N/A
1593	May 24, 2002	Hilary Swank, Steve Harvey, The Promise Ring	N/A
1594	June 4, 2002	Anthony Hopkins, Jake Johannsen, Norah Jones	N/A
1595	June 5, 2002	Jason Priestley, Marc Maron, David Rakoff	N/A
1596	June 6, 2002	Chris Rock, Richard Schiff, Dan Naturman	N/A
1597	June 7, 2002	Tom Brokaw, Liev Schreiber, John Pizzarelli	N/A
1598	June 11, 2002	Alicia Silverstone, Hannah Storm, New Found Glory	N/A
1599	June 12, 2002	Matthew McConaughey, Linda Cardellini, Tom Papa	N/A
1600	June 13, 2002	Sarah Michelle Gellar, Larry Hagman, The Hives	N/A
1601	June 14, 2002	Christian Slater, George Gray, Abra Moore	N/A
1602	June 18, 2002	David Bowie, Colin Farrell,	N/A
1603	June 19, 2002	Caroline Rhea, Tommy Davidson, Elvis Costello	N/A
1604	June 20, 2002	David Cross, Bob Odenkirk,	N/A
1605	June 21, 2002	Peter Gallagher, Brian Kiley,	N/A
1606	June 25, 2002	Shannon Elizabeth, N.E.R.D,	N/A
1607	June 26, 2002	Tony Danza, Dermot Mulroney, Brian Kiley	N/A
1608	June 27, 2002	Adam Sandler, Christopher Meloni, Our Lady Peace	N/A
1609	June 28, 2002	Jarod Miller, Margaret Cho, Jim Gaffigan	N/A
1610	July 9, 2002	Tom Hanks, Paul Westerberg,	N/A
1611	July 10, 2002	Sam Donaldson, Busta Rhymes, Gene Pompa	N/A
1612	July 11, 2002	Steve Irwin, Amy Sedaris, Andrew W.K.	N/A
1613	July 12, 2002	Michelle Williams, Counting Crows, Richard Kind	N/A
1614	July 16, 2002	Patrick Swayze, Patton Oswalt, The Vines	N/A
1615	July 17, 2002	Harrison Ford, Jennifer Esposito, Wilco	N/A
1616	July 18, 2002	David Arquette, Tony Robbins, Todd Barry	N/A
1617	July 19, 2002	Sigourney Weaver, Rachel Dratch,	N/A
1618	July 24, 2002	Alan Cumming, Rich Hall, Robert Evans	N/A
1619	July 25, 2002	Martin Lawrence, Los Lobos,	N/A
1620	July 26, 2002	Chazz Palminteri, Beth Orton,	N/A
1621	August 6, 2002	John C. Reilly, Fred Savage, Patrice O'Neal	N/A
1622	August 7, 2002	Dave Chappelle, Paul Rudd, Isaac Mizrahi	N/A
1623	August 8, 2002	Jeff Daniels, Raven Goodwin	Filter
1624	August 9, 2002	Ice Cube, Harland Williams, Lyle Lovett	N/A
1625	August 13, 2002	Gwyneth Paltrow, They Might Be Giants, Kevin Nealon	N/A
1626	August 14, 2002	Kevin Pollak, Jeremy Northam, Jim Gaffigan	N/A
1627	August 15, 2002	Wesley Snipes, Steve Coogan, Oasis	N/A
1628	August 16, 2002	Caroline Rhea, Tracy Morgan, The Strokes	N/A
