= List of Late Night with Conan O'Brien episodes (season 7) =

This is a list of episodes for Season 7 of Late Night with Conan O'Brien, which aired from September 7, 1999 to August 18, 2000.

== Series overview ==
Season	Episodes	Originally aired	
Season	Episodes	First aired	Last aired
1	230	September 13, 1993	September 9, 1994
2	229	September 12, 1994	September 8, 1995
3	195	September 11, 1995	September 13, 1996
4	162	September 17, 1996	August 22, 1997
5	170	September 9, 1997	August 28, 1998
6	160	September 15, 1998	August 20, 1999
7	153	September 7, 1999	August 18, 2000
8	145	September 5, 2000	August 17, 2001
9	160	September 4, 2001	August 16, 2002
10	160	September 3, 2002	August 15, 2003
11	153	September 3, 2003	August 13, 2004
12	166	August 31, 2004	August 19, 2005
13	162	September 6, 2005	August 30, 2006
14	195	September 5, 2006	August 31, 2007
15	163	September 4, 2007	August 29, 2008
16	98	September 2, 2008	February 20, 2009

== Season 7 ==
No.	Original release date	Guest(s)	Musical/entertainment guest(s)
1146	September 7, 1999	Martin Short, John Tesh	The Candy Butchers
1147	September 8, 1999	Chris Rock, Ann Curry	N/A
1148	September 9, 1999	Sam Donaldson, Illeana Douglas	Jimeoin
1149	September 10, 1999	Tom Brokaw, Michael Beach	Fleming and John
1150	September 14, 1999	Dave Chappelle, Vicki Lewis	John Prine
1151	September 15, 1999	Tom Arnold, David Cross	Lewis Black
1152	September 16, 1999	Janeane Garofalo, John Stamos	N/A
1153	September 17, 1999	Jenna Elfman, Mark McKinney	Indigenous
1154	September 21, 1999	Chris Kattan, Artie Lange	Cidny Bullens
1155	September 22, 1999	Dennis Rodman, Bruce McCulloch, Rich Hall	N/A
1156	September 23, 1999	Norm Macdonald, Sean Hayes	N/A
1157	September 24, 1999	Adam Sandler, Peta Wilson, Chris Eigeman	N/A
1158	September 28, 1999	Sarah Michelle Gellar	Garth Brooks
1159	September 29, 1999	Isabella Rossellini, Eric Idle	Tom Shillue
1160	September 30, 1999	Brooke Shields, Peter Gallagher	Filter
1161	October 1, 1999	Kevin Spacey, Christina Applegate, Naseem Hamed	N/A
1162	October 5, 1999	Molly Shannon, Larry David	Eve
1163	October 6, 1999	Anthony Michael Hall, Steven Wright	Mia St. John
1164	October 7, 1999	D. B. Sweeney, Elisabeth Shue	Kyle Dunnigan
1165	October 8, 1999	Rob Reiner, Amy Brenneman	Sheryl Crow
1166	October 12, 1999	David Boreanaz	Moxy Früvous
1167	October 13, 1999	Rosie O'Donnell, Serena Williams, Louis Theroux	N/A
1168	October 14, 1999	Judd Nelson, Will Ferrell	Tori Amos
1169	October 15, 1999	Jon Stewart	Paula Cole
1170	October 19, 1999	Caroline Rhea, Jesse L. Martin	Greg Giraldo
1171	October 20, 1999	Ving Rhames, Meat Loaf	Bush
1172	October 21, 1999	Dylan McDermott, Mick Foley	Jimmie's Chicken Shack
1173	October 22, 1999	Gloria Estefan, Jerry O'Connell	Jimmy Blaylock
1174	November 2, 1999	Jarod Miller, Alan Cumming, Kevin Smith	N/A
1175	November 3, 1999	Lauren Holly, Al Franken	Café Tacuba
1176	November 4, 1999	Shannen Doherty, Martin Scorsese	Counting Crows
1177	November 5, 1999	Heather Locklear, Randy Quaid, Dave Grohl	N/A
1178	November 9, 1999	Ben Affleck, Denise Richards, Robert Schimmel	N/A
1179	November 10, 1999	Lisa Kudrow, Arnold Schwarzenegger,	N/A
1180	November 11, 1999	David Spade, Jennifer Love Hewitt	Rage Against the Machine
1181	November 12, 1999	Jay Leno, Smash Mouth,	N/A
1182	November 16, 1999	Charlize Theron, David Bowie,	N/A
1183	November 17, 1999	Lennox Lewis, Dave Chappelle, Don Knotts	N/A
1184	November 18, 1999	Jennifer Aniston, Tim Burton, Los Straitjackets	N/A
1185	November 19, 1999	Jerry Springer, Christina Ricci, Louis C.K.	N/A
1186	November 23, 1999	Brian Williams, Hilary Swank, Everything but the Girl	N/A
1187	November 24, 1999	Jay Mohr, S. Epatha Merkerson, Janine Ditullio	N/A
1188	November 25, 1999	Roshumba, Dave Foley, Joe Strummer	N/A
1189	November 26, 1999	Heidi Klum	Sting
1190	November 30, 1999	Kevin Pollak, Ben Foster, John Lurie and the Lounge Lizards	N/A
1191	December 1, 1999	Kirk Douglas, Carson Daly, Dan Cronin	N/A
1192	December 2, 1999	Saffron Burrows	Garth Brooks
1193	December 3, 1999	Tim Robbins, Laura Kightlinger, Timothy "Speed" Levitch	N/A
1194	December 14, 1999	Susan Sarandon, Carl Reiner	Alison Krauss & Union Station
1195	December 15, 1999	Julianne Moore, Rob Schneider, Michael Stipe	N/A
1196	December 16, 1999	Eriq La Salle, Alan Cumming	Tonic
1197	December 17, 1999	Jim Carrey	Tony Bennett
1198	December 21, 1999	Tom Brokaw, Alan Rickman, Matthew Sweet	N/A
1199	December 22, 1999	Felicity Huffman, Jamie Foxx, Lewis Black	N/A
1200	December 23, 1999	Caroline Rhea, Artie Lange	Sloan
1201	December 28, 1999	Matt Damon, Camryn Manheim	Marshall Crenshaw
1202	December 29, 1999	LL Cool J, Jud Hale, Andy Blitz	N/A
1203	December 30, 1999	Darrell Hammond, Frank McCourt	Guster
1204	January 4, 2000	Christopher Walken, Joe Montana, Ruth Gerson	N/A
1205	January 5, 2000	Clyde Peeling, Samm Levine	N/A
1206	January 6, 2000	Jeff Daniels, Rich Hall, Mike Lupica	N/A
1207	January 7, 2000	Bill Pullman, Catherine Keener	John Linnell
1208	January 11, 2000	Freddie Prinze, Jr., John C. Reilly	Hank Williams III
1209	January 12, 2000	Sarah Jessica Parker, Robert Wagner, Carlton Fisk	N/A
1210	January 13, 2000	Angelina Jolie, Upright Citizens Brigade, Robert Urich	N/A
1211	January 14, 2000	Winona Ryder, Marc Maron	Wilco
1212	January 25, 2000	Ashley Judd, Tracy Morgan	Shelby Lynne
1213	January 26, 2000	Jeff Bridges, Steve Van Zandt, Sarah Silverman	N/A
1214	January 27, 2000	Jason Priestley, Stockard Channing, Maria Bamford	N/A
1215	January 28, 2000	Steven Wright, Paul Thomas Anderson	Jack Ingram
1216	February 1, 2000	Al Roker, Todd Barry, Mickey Hart	N/A
1217	February 2, 2000	David Arquette, S. Epatha Merkerson, Artie Lange	N/A
1218	February 3, 2000	Alan Cumming, Parker Posey	Live
1219	February 4, 2000	Mary Tyler Moore, Virginie Ledoyen,	N/A
1220	February 8, 2000	Jenny McCarthy,	N/A
1221	February 9, 2000	Jarod Miller, Kareem Abdul-Jabbar,	N/A
1222	February 10, 2000	Julianna Margulies, Suzanne Somers, Betty F	N/A
1223	February 11, 2000	Peta Wilson, Julia Sweeney, Macy Gray,	N/A
1224	February 15, 2000	Matthew Perry, Charlize Theron, Tony Robbins	N/A
1225	February 16, 2000	Rob Lowe, Ed McMahon, Beth Orton	N/A
1226	February 17, 2000	Jane Seymour, Matthew Modine, Beck	N/A
1227	February 18, 2000	John Lithgow, Ana Gasteyer, Aimee Mann	N/A
1228	February 22, 2000	Gary Sinise, Horatio Sanz	Robert Schimmel
1229	February 23, 2000	Kevin Pollak, Alex Kingston,	Kittie
1230	February 24, 2000	Howie Mandel, Dan Castellaneta,	N/A
1231	February 25, 2000	John Stamos	Slipknot
1232	February 29, 2000	Melissa Joan Hart, Darrell Hammond	The Cure
1233	March 1, 2000	Kim Delaney, Lisa Rinna, Tom Agna	N/A
1234	March 2, 2000	Rupert Everett, George Stephanopoulos, Ainsley Harriott	N/A
1236	March 14, 2000	William H. Macy, D. L. Hughley, Vernon Chatman	N/A
1237	March 15, 2000	Martin Sheen, Afro Celt Sound System,	N/A
1238	March 16, 2000	Will Ferrell, Jerry O'Connell	System of a Down
1239	March 17, 2000	Jon Stewart, Eric Idle, Fran Lebowitz	N/A
1240	March 21, 2000	Jim Breuer, Vincent Pastore	David Gray
1241	March 22, 2000	Cynthia Garrett, Louis C.K.	N/A
1242	March 23, 2000	Amy Sedaris, Gabriel Byrne,	N/A
1243	March 24, 2000	Jim Fowler, Keely Smith,	N/A
1244	April 4, 2000	Tom Brokaw, Artie Lange	Foo Fighters
1245	April 5, 2000	Jason Gedrick, Dana Carvey, Patton Oswalt	N/A
1246	April 6, 2000	David Duchovny, Kyra Sedgwick,	N/A
1247	April 7, 2000	Bonnie Hunt, Willem Dafoe	No Doubt
1248	April 11, 2000	Tom Arnold, Heidi Klum	Stereophonics
1249	April 12, 2000	Claudia Schiffer, Frankie Muniz, Ed Byrne	N/A
1250	April 13, 2000	Scott Thompson, Hugh Hefner, Sarah Silverman	N/A
1251	April 14, 2000	Sherman Hemsley, Josh Rouse,	N/A
1252	April 18, 2000	Matthew Broderick, Michael Chiklis, David Feldman	N/A
1253	April 19, 2000	Rosie O'Donnell, Stanley Tucci	Sevendust
1254	April 20, 2000	Matt Lauer, Omar Epps, Denis Hamill	N/A
1255	April 21, 2000	Jack Black, Mira Sorvino	Elliott Smith
1256	April 25, 2000	Harvey Keitel, Michael Palin	Cypress Hill
1257	April 26, 2000	Luke Wilson	N/A
1258	April 27, 2000	Bob Costas, Kristen Johnston, Boyd Matson	N/A
1259	April 28, 2000	Heather Graham, Julie Warner	Dido
1260	May 2, 2000	Allan Houston, Jimmy Tingle	Travis
1261	May 3, 2000	Barry White, Upright Citizens Brigade,	N/A
1262	May 4, 2000	Kevin James, Denis Hamill,	N/A
1263	May 5, 2000	Tyra Banks, Peter Gallagher,	N/A
1264	May 9, 2000	Britney Spears, Kyle MacLachlan	Guided by Voices
1265	May 10, 2000	Roma Downey, Greg Giraldo, Craig Bierko	N/A
1266	May 11, 2000	Ethan Hawke, Jerry Springer	Supergrass
1267	May 12, 2000	Molly Shannon & Will Ferrell, David Boreanaz, Mike Lupica	N/A
1268	May 16, 2000	Jane Leeves, Jon Lovitz	A Perfect Circle
1269	May 17, 2000	Caroline Rhea, Amy Brenneman, Buzz Aldrin	N/A
1270	May 18, 2000	Michael Rapaport, Sarah Michelle Gellar, Tony V	N/A
1271	May 19, 2000	William H. Macy, Marie Osmond	Marah
1272	May 23, 2000	Jarod Miller, Jeri Ryan, Son Seals	N/A
1273	May 24, 2000	Kevin Nealon, Jake Johannsen,	N/A
1274	May 25, 2000	Scott Thompson, Craig Bierko	They Might Be Giants
1275	May 26, 2000	Andy's Good-bye Show,	N/A
1276	June 6, 2000	Nathan Lane, Rachel Dratch	N/A
1277	June 7, 2000	Kenneth Branagh, Penn & Teller	Goo Goo Dolls
1278	June 8, 2000	Alicia Silverstone, Andy Dick, Lewis Black	N/A
1279	June 9, 2000	Jimmy Smits, White Trash Wins Lotto,	N/A
1280	June 13, 2000	Kelsey Grammer, Jason Biggs	Yo La Tengo
1282	June 15, 2000	Janeane Garofalo, Jerry Stiller, Bill Braudis	N/A
1283	June 16, 2000	Patrick Stewart, Julie Brown	Guy Davis
1284	June 20, 2000	Al Roker, Cheri Oteri	Lou Reed
1285	June 21, 2000	Sam Donaldson	Todd Rundgren
1286	June 22, 2000	Calista Flockhart, Big Show	Busta Rhymes
1287	June 23, 2000	Samuel L. Jackson, Patricia Heaton, Eugene Mirman	N/A
1288	June 27, 2000	Bob Costas, Carmen Electra	Phish
1289	June 28, 2000	Steven Wright, John C. Reilly, Jonathan Richman	N/A
1290	June 29, 2000	Nicholas Turturro, Tracy Morgan, Paul Nardizzi	N/A
1291	June 30, 2000	Melissa Joan Hart, Marlon Wayans, Swan Dive	N/A
1292	July 11, 2000	Tom Arnold, Chris Meloni	Jimmy Page & The Black Crowes
1293	July 12, 2000	Bill Flanagan, Darrell Hammond, Joy Behar	N/A
1294	July 13, 2000	Rebecca Romijn-Stamos, Marc Maron, Greg Hahn	N/A
1295	July 14, 2000	Halle Berry, Shawn Wayans	Papa Roach
1296	July 18, 2000	Rich Hall, William Shatner	Sonic Youth
1297	July 19, 2000	Famke Janssen, Artie Lange, Steve Earle	N/A
1298	July 20, 2000	Brian Williams, Amber Valletta,	N/A
1299	July 21, 2000	Al Roker, Vicki Lewis, Skipp Sudduth	N/A
1300	July 25, 2000	Harrison Ford, Caroline Rhea	North Mississippi Allstars
1301	July 26, 2000	Christopher Walken, Mr. T, Mike Lukas	N/A
1302	July 27, 2000	Dave Chappelle, Kylie Bax, Sarah Vowell	N/A
1303	July 28, 2000	Roger Ebert, Richard Roeper, Tara MacLean	N/A
1304	August 8, 2000	Zach Galifianakis, Craig Bierko,	N/A
1305	August 9, 2000	Kevin Bacon, MxPx,	N/A
1306	August 10, 2000	Donald Sutherland, Todd Barry,	N/A
1307	August 11, 2000	Clyde Peeling, John Waters	De La Soul & Redman
1308	August 15, 2000	Michael Madsen	Busta Rhymes
1309	August 16, 2000	Chris Rock, Tom Clancy,	N/A
1310	August 17, 2000	Triple H, Elizabeth Berkley, Mo'Nique	N/A
1311	August 18, 2000	Orlando Jones, The Brian Setzer Orchestra	N/A
