= List of Late Night with Conan O'Brien episodes (season 12) =

This is a list of episodes for Season 12 of Late Night with Conan O'Brien, which aired from August 31, 2004 to August 19, 2005.

== Series overview ==
| Season | Episodes | Originally aired | |
| Season | Episodes | First aired | Last aired |
|---|---|---|---|
| 1 | 230 | September 13, 1993 | September 9, 1994 |
| 2 | 229 | September 12, 1994 | September 8, 1995 |
| 3 | 195 | September 11, 1995 | September 13, 1996 |
| 4 | 162 | September 17, 1996 | August 22, 1997 |
| 5 | 170 | September 9, 1997 | August 28, 1998 |
| 6 | 160 | September 15, 1998 | August 20, 1999 |
| 7 | 153 | September 7, 1999 | August 18, 2000 |
| 8 | 145 | September 5, 2000 | August 17, 2001 |
| 9 | 160 | September 4, 2001 | August 16, 2002 |
| 10 | 160 | September 3, 2002 | August 15, 2003 |
| 11 | 153 | September 3, 2003 | August 13, 2004 |
| 12 | 166 | August 31, 2004 | August 19, 2005 |
| 13 | 162 | September 6, 2005 | August 30, 2006 |
| 14 | 195 | September 5, 2006 | August 31, 2007 |
| 15 | 163 | September 4, 2007 | August 29, 2008 |
| 16 | 98 | September 2, 2008 | February 20, 2009 |

== Season 12 ==
| No. | Original release date | Guest(s) | Musical/entertainment guest(s) |
|---|---|---|---|
| 1942 | August 31, 2004 | Al Franken, Jason Bateman | Breaking Benjamin |
Sketches include: Republican Convention Protesters, Actual Items, Passion of the Christ Product Replacement
| 1943 | September 1, 2004 | John C. Reilly, Ja Rule, David Feherty | N/A |
Sketches include: Clutch Cargo, Max Weinberg's RNC Speech
| 1944 | September 2, 2004 | Dave Chappelle, Rose Byrne, Sam Roberts | N/A |
Sketches include: Convention Madness, News Correspondent, Brian on the Spot
| 1945 | September 3, 2004 | Jeremy Piven, Tim Meadows | Bruce Hornsby |
Sketches include: Clutch Cargo, Conan O'Brien Hates My Homeland
| 1946 | September 7, 2004 | Andy Richter, Neve Campbell | Jane Monheit |
Sketches include: Controversial Sports Outfits, Walker Texas Ranger Lever, Veterans For Truth
| 1947 | September 8, 2004 | Bill Maher, Duane Chapman ("Dog" the Bounty Hunter) | Radio 4 |
Sketches include: Walker Texas Ranger Lever
| 1948 | September 9, 2004 | Matthew Broderick, Denise Richards, Dave Eggers | N/A |
Sketches include: Wandering Iowa Republican Delegate, Labor Day Backyard BBQ Photos
| 1949 | September 10, 2004 | Paris Hilton, Stuart Townsend, Scissor Sisters | N/A |
| 1950 | September 14, 2004 | Donald Trump, Wayne Brady, Crossfade | N/A |
| 1951 | September 15, 2004 | Megan Mullally, Tony Danza, Jud Hale | N/A |
Sketches include: TRUMP Late Night with Conan O'Brien, Clutch Cargo
| 1952 | September 16, 2004 | Gwyneth Paltrow, Paul Bettany, Drive-By Truckers | N/A |
Sketches Include: Partisan TV, Pierre Bernard's Recliner of Rage
| 1953 | September 17, 2004 | Drew Barrymore, Mark Cuban, Emo Philips | N/A |
| 1954 | September 21, 2004 | Tiger Woods, Selma Blair, Tears For Fears | N/A |
Sketches include: New U.S Stamps
| 1955 | September 22, 2004 | Matt LeBlanc, Anthony Edwards, Terry Gross | N/A |
Sketches include: SAT Analogies, Instant Viewer Feedback
| 1956 | September 23, 2004 | Tom Brokaw, Katie Holmes, Robert Schimmel | N/A |
Sketches include: Decision 2004 Clutch Cargo
| 1957 | September 24, 2004 | Rob Lowe, Jill Hennessy, Elvis Costello | N/A |
Sketches Include: Jerry Butters' Surprise Visit
| 1958 | September 28, 2004 | Jim Belushi, Eve, Keane | N/A |
Sketches include: Actual Items, Conan O'Brien Hates My Homeland
| 1959 | September 29, 2004 | Christopher Walken, Dylan Walsh, Wilco | N/A |
Sketches include: Decision 2004 Clutch Cargo, Eyeballs O'Shaughnessy
| 1960 | September 30, 2004 | James Spader, Amy Poehler, Kenny Hotz and Spencer Rice | N/A |
Sketches include: New Fall Characters, New Names for Montreal Expos, Diego the Lobster Messiah
| 1961 | October 1, 2004 | Joaquin Phoenix, Teri Hatcher, Supergrass | N/A |
Sketches include: If They Mated, Jerry Butters
| 1962 | October 5, 2004 | Jimmy Fallon, Chad Michael Murray, Good Charlotte | N/A |
Sketches include: Celebrity Survey, St. Helens Eruption, Audience Pet Rabbit
| 1963 | October 6, 2004 | Hilary Duff, Anthony Kiedis, Rilo Kiley | N/A |
Sketches include: Decision 2004 Clutch Cargo, The St. Helens Eruption is Imminent, Announcements & Wishes from the Band
| 1964 | October 7, 2004 | Drew Carey, Carolyn Kepcher, Mo Rocca | N/A |
| 1965 | October 8, 2004 | Sean "P. Diddy" Combs, Dave Navarro, Interpol | N/A |
Sketches include: Cheer Up Martha Stewart!, St. Helens' Major Eruption, Joel & God advertise
| 1966 | October 12, 2004 | Brian Williams, Tom Green, Mitch Hedberg | N/A |
Sketches include: LaBamba scams Conan, Kids Drawings, Hannigan the Travelling Salesman
| 1967 | October 13, 2004 | Matt Stone and Trey Parker, Seth Meyers, The Libertines | N/A |
Sketches include: Staffers try to persuade the undecided voters, Yankees Fan in the Audience
| 1968 | October 14, 2004 | Al Roker, Tracy Morgan, Jimmy Eat World | N/A |
Sketches include: Presidential Debate Party Photos, On the Phone with Bill O'Reilly
| 1969 | October 15, 2004 | Jason Schwartzman, Jason Ritter, Sum 41 | N/A |
Sketches include: Actual Items, On the Phone with Bill O'Reilly, New Frankenstein Movie!
| 1970 | October 19, 2004 | Allison Janney, James Ellroy, The Black Keys | N/A |
Sketches Include: SAT Analogies, On the Phone with Bill O'Reilly, Can Joel Get Inoculated?
| 1971 | October 20, 2004 | Claire Danes, Carson Kressley, Mavis Staples | N/A |
Sketches include: Conan of the Night
| 1972 | October 21, 2004 | Jude Law, Meredith Vieira, The Explosion | N/A |
Sketches include: Clutch Cargo, On the Phone with Bill O'Reilly, Don't Vote
| 1973 | October 22, 2004 | Sarah Michelle Gellar, Will Arnett, Rob Mies (Bat Expert) | N/A |
Sketches include: Triumph the Insult Comic Dog visits Undecided Voters, Frankenstein dressed for Halloween
| 1974 | November 3, 2004 | Hank Azaria, Tommy Lee, Jet | N/A |
Sketches include: Decision 2004 Clutch Cargo, The World Reacts to George W. Bush's reelection
| 1975 | November 4, 2004 | Jay-Z, Jerry O'Connell, The Music | N/A |
Sketches include: Final look at Decision 2004, Fantastic!
| 1976 | November 5, 2004 | Eva Longoria, Terry Francona, Sarah Vowell | N/A |
Sketches include: What in the World!?, Lullaby
| 1977 | November 9, 2004 | Tina Fey, Spencer Fox, Fatboy Slim | N/A |
Sketches include: Celebrity Survey, Conan O'Brien Hates My Homeland
| 1978 | November 10, 2004 | Salma Hayek, Adam Brody, Josh Groban | N/A |
Sketches include: GE Satellite Channels
| 1979 | November 11, 2004 | Pierce Brosnan, Paget Brewster | Beastie Boys |
Sketches include: Sweeps Ahoy!, Pierre Bernard's Recliner of Rage
| 1980 | November 12, 2004 | Chazz Palminteri, Marcia Cross, Arj Barker | N/A |
Max Weinberg via Satellite, Audience Interview, New State Quarters
| 1981 | November 16, 2004 | Tim Allen, Eddie Izzard, Chingy | N/A |
Sketches include: Actual Items, Jerry Butters
| 1982 | November 17, 2004 | Dan Aykroyd, Ayda Field, Mike Lupica | N/A |
Sketches include: Late Night Budget Cuts, Reality TV Small Talk Moment
| 1983 | November 18, 2004 | Woody Harrelson, Paul Reubens | The Flaming Lips |
Sketches include: If They Mated, Hole on the Floor
| 1984 | November 19, 2004 | William Shatner, Patton Oswalt, The Neville Brothers | N/A |
Sketches include: In the Year 2000: The Shatner Edition, Gun Toting, Nascar driving Jesus, Atomic Clog-O
| 1985 | November 23, 2004 | Kelsey Grammer, Rosario Dawson, Lee Lindeman | N/A |
Sketches include: NCAA Football Mascots, Reality TV Small Talk Moment
| 1986 | November 24, 2004 | John Tesh, Horatio Sanz, Velvet Revolver | N/A |
Sketches include: Clutch Cargo, Feast for Our Favorite Characters
| 1987 | November 25, 2004 | Steve Irwin, Paul Giamatti, The Zutons | N/A |
Sketches include: Joel Announcing for the Macy's Thanksgiving Day Parade, What Are They Doing Right Now?, Late Night Thanksgiving Guide for College Students Coming Home
| 1988 | November 26, 2004 | Colin Farrell, Craig Bierko | Sparta |
Sketches include: Actual Items, Hannigan the Traveling Salesman
| 1989 | November 30, 2004 | Val Kilmer, Peter Gallagher, The Killers | N/A |
Sketches include: Hole in the Floor, Celebrity Survey, Reality TV Small Talk Moment
| 1990 | December 1, 2004 | Diane Sawyer, Thomas Haden Church, The Hives | N/A |
Sketches include: 1st Annual Late Night Stump Lighting Ceremony, Farewell Tom Brokaw, Killing Time
| 1991 | December 2, 2004 | Alec Baldwin, Jason Biggs, Guided By Voices | N/A |
Sketches include: Route to the Late Night Christmas Stump, SAT Analogies
| 1992 | December 3, 2004 | Brooke Shields, Ryan Reynolds, Todd Barry | N/A |
Sketches include: Conan On the Aisle, New Max Weinberg
| 1993 | December 14, 2004 | Kevin Spacey, Billy Connolly, Skindred | N/A |
Sketches include: LaBamba sings the National Anthem, Vomiting Kermit, Worlds Fastest Menorah/Bungee Jumping baby Jesus/Rocket-powered fruit cake, Trump Secrets
| 1994 | December 15, 2004 | Liam Neeson, Triple H, Avril Lavigne | N/A |
Sketches include: Pale Male plays the Organ, Audience Interview, World's Largest Air Freshener
| 1995 | December 16, 2004 | Téa Leoni, Marc Maron, Neil McCalmont | N/A |
Sketches include: Pale Male plays the Flute, Kids Drawings
| 1996 | December 17, 2004 | Adam Sandler, My Chemical Romance, | N/A |
Sketches include: Pale Male plays the Bongos, New Holiday Stamps, Bernard Kerik Scandals
| 1997 | December 21, 2004 | Jeff Goldblum, Joy Behar, Nellie McKay | N/A |
Sketches include: Conan's Christmas Cards, Do they Know it's Christmas?
| 1998 | December 22, 2004 | Whoopi Goldberg, Danny Masterson, Lewis Black | N/A |
Sketches include: Clutch Cargo, Late Night Christmas Tree
| 1999 | December 23, 2004 | Bill Murray, Tony Bennett, | N/A |
Sketches include: Conan Travels: Christmas Caroling in New Jersey, Reality TV Small Talk Moment
| 2000 | December 28, 2004 | Clyde Peeling, Kenan Thompson, Eugene Mirman | N/A |
Sketches include: 2004 Year in Review, Jerry Butters
| 2001 | December 29, 2004 | Carson Daly, Rich Hall, Gov't Mule | N/A |
Sketches include: Foreign Holidaze, Pierre Bernard's Recliner of Rage
| 2002 | December 30, 2004 | Snoop Dogg, Keri Russell, Mos Def | N/A |
Sketches include: Oh what a year it was!, The Grinder!, Reality TV Small Talk Moment
| 2003 | December 31, 2004 | New Year's Eve Show: Darrell Hammond, Susie Essman, The Ditty Bops | N/A |
Sketches include: Happy New Year (A reminiscing of the past year)!, Desperate Loser alone on New Year's Eve.
| 2004 | January 11, 2005 | Samuel L. Jackson, Maura Tierney, Tegan & Sara | N/A |
Sketches include: Demolished 9th Floor NBC Offices, Actual Items, Eyeballs O'Shaugnessy
| 2005 | January 12, 2005 | John Mayer, Patrick Wilson, Twista & Faith Evans | N/A |
Sketches include: Celebrity Survey, Lullaby [Ft. John Mayer]
| 2006 | January 13, 2005 | Topher Grace, Nia Long, Jim Gaffigan | N/A |
Sketches include: Hey, it's January, let's Talk About Baseball!, Conan O'Brien Hates My Homeland
| 2007 | January 14, 2005 | Dennis Quaid, Frankie Muniz, Senses Fail | N/A |
Sketches include: New Characters for 2005, Reality TV Small Talk Moment
| 2008 | January 18, 2005 | Heidi Klum, Harland Williams, Joss Stone | N/A |
Sketches include: Gun toting, Nascar Driving Jesus, SAT Analogies
| 2009 | January 19, 2005 | Ice Cube, Carmen Electra, Ray LaMontagne | N/A |
Sketches include: If They Mated
| 2010 | January 20, 2005 | Ethan Hawke, Randy Jackson, Sharon Jones & The Dap-Kings | N/A |
Sketches include: Fulfilling Our Legal Obligation to make fun of Donald Trump's Wedding, Triumph the Insult Comic Dog visits the Grammy's Presentation Practice Speeches
| 2011 | January 21, 2005 | John Leguizamo, Nicole Richie, Tariq Nasheed | N/A |
| 2012 | February 1, 2005 | Alan Alda, Jeffrey Tambor, Arcade Fire | N/A |
Includes: Conan's tribute to Johnny Carson
| 2013 | February 2, 2005 | Donald Trump, Mekhi Phifer, Demetri Martin | N/A |
Sketches include: Clutch Cargo
| 2014 | February 3, 2005 | Brian Williams, Jimmy Buffett, Maroon 5 | N/A |
Sketches include: State of the Show Address, Compara-Thin
| 2015 | February 4, 2005 | Sharon Osbourne, Dermot Mulroney, Jem | N/A |
Sketches include: Late Night's Superbowl Preview, The Airhorn
| 2016 | February 8, 2005 | Simon Cowell, Will Forte, The Dirty Dozen Brass Band | N/A |
Sketches include: Clutch Cargo, Real Sports fans (Patriots)
| 2017 | February 9, 2005 | Kevin James, Mark Burnett, Joe Tamargo | N/A |
Sketches include: Checking Me Out, Actual Items
| 2018 | February 10, 2005 | Jason Bateman, Caroline Rhea, Robert Randolph & The Family Band | N/A |
Sketches include: Valentine's Day Survival Guide, A phone call with Queen Elizabeth
| 2019 | February 11, 2005 | Seth Green, Josh Duhamel, Ted Leo & The Pharmacists | N/A |
Sketches include: New State Quarters, Fantastic!
| 2020 | February 15, 2005 | Alan Cumming, Gavin Rossdale, They Might Be Giants | N/A |
Sketches include: Celebrity Survey, Yellow Shades/Chaz Man/Crudd
| 2021 | February 16, 2005 | Tom Selleck, Jamie Kennedy, Kenny Chesney | N/A |
Sketches include: Ashlee Simpson's preparation for first U.S Tour, In the Year 2000: The Selleck Edition, Conan O'Brien Hates My Homeland
| 2022 | February 17, 2005 | Hilary Swank, Roger Ebert, Lee Ann Womack | N/A |
Sketches include: Behind the Scenes: USA Network Offices, Hockey Season is Cancelled!
| 2023 | February 18, 2005 | Charlie Sheen, Molly Sims, Emo Philips | N/A |
Sketches include: Triumph the Insult Comic Dog at the Grammy Awards, Late Night Scandals
| 2024 | February 22, 2005 | Tom Arnold, Rachel Weisz, Rufus Wainwright | N/A |
Sketches include: Sweeps Ahoy!
| 2025 | February 23, 2005 | Christina Ricci, Artie Lange, Ian Brown | N/A |
Sketches include: Triumph the Insult Comic Dog at the Grammys [Pt. 2], Two IOC Members
| 2026 | February 24, 2005 | Barbara Walters, Omar Epps, The Futureheads | N/A |
Sketches include: Hooray for the Oscars!, Late Night Investigates, with Max Weinberg
| 2027 | February 25, 2005 | John Travolta, Shannon Elizabeth, Aqueduct | N/A |
Sketches include: Conan on the Aisle
| 2028 | March 1, 2005 | Tyra Banks, Jesse Eisenberg, Slipknot | N/A |
Sketches include: Jorge Drexler's Oscar revisited, Patterns, Adrian Foster
| 2029 | March 2, 2005 | Sean Combs, Christina Milian, Ben Lee | N/A |
Sketches include: Late Night Staff Talent Show, Slipnuts
| 2030 | March 3, 2005 | The Rock, Brittany Snow, Gary Johnson | N/A |
Sketches include: Conan Guesses What You Do, Reality TV Small Talk Moment
| 2031 | March 4, 2005 | Vin Diesel, Fred Armisen, Low Millions | N/A |
Sketches include: Luring Martha Stewart
| 2032 | March 8, 2005 | Sylvester Stallone, Ben Foster, Solomon Burke | N/A |
Sketches include: Kids Drawings, Pierre Bernard's Recliner of Rage, Walker Texas Ranger Lever
| 2033 | March 9, 2005 | Robin Williams, Nigella Lawson, | N/A |
Sketches include: Slipnuts, Conan O'Brien Hates My Homeland
| 2034 | March 10, 2005 | Bruce Willis, Jamie King, Regina Spektor | N/A |
Sketches include: Hey Winter, we're done already!
| 2035 | March 11, 2005 | John Lithgow, Kevin Pollak, Death From Above 1979 | N/A |
Sketches include: Clutch Cargo, God Visits
| 2036 | March 22, 2005 | Jarod Miller, Ozzy Osbourne, Trace Adkins | N/A |
Sketches include: Actual Items, Pat O'Brien/Conan O'Brien Newspaper Mixups
| 2037 | March 23, 2005 | Clive Owen, Steve Carell, The Fabulous Moolah | N/A |
Sketches include: Late Night's Evolution
| 2038 | March 24, 2005 | Benicio Del Toro, Jordana Brewster, Kings of Leon | N/A |
Sketches include: 4th Place!, Welcome Back, stage manager Charlie Pinsky!, NCAA Basketball Mascots
| 2039 | March 25, 2005 | Jessica Alba, Mike Binder | Queens of the Stone Age |
Sketches include: Potty Break, GE Satellite Channels
| 2040 | March 29, 2005 | Al Franken, Alicia Silverstone, Marc Broussard | N/A |
Sketches include: Celebrity Survey, the Easter Bunny visits
| 2041 | March 30, 2005 | Queen Latifah, Big Show, Zach Galifianakis | N/A |
Sketches include: Things You Didn't Know About the Band, What in the World!?, The Drive for 5
| 2042 | March 31, 2005 | Penélope Cruz, Will Arnett, John Doe | N/A |
Sketches include: We're #4, New U.S Stamps, Guest Coincidences
| 2043 | April 1, 2005 | Pamela Anderson, Bob Saget | Brendan Benson |
Sketches include: Joel's wife's April Fools prank, Michael Jackson Trial Made-For-TV Movie, The Drive for 5, Best Moments of the USA, Fantastic!
| 2044 | April 5, 2005 | Gisele Bündchen, Johnny Damon, Hot Hot Heat | N/A |
Sketches Include: SAT Analogies, Sports Talk/Behind the Camera: Unauthorized story of Mork & Mindy Small Talk Moment, Phone Call to Mom
| 2045 | April 6, 2005 | Matthew McConaughey, John Stamos, Moby | N/A |
Sketches include: A phone call with Queen Elizabeth & Sean Connery, Comedy Spring Cleaning, Sports Talk/Behind the Camera: Unauthorized story of Mork & Mindy Small Talk Moment
| 2046 | April 7, 2005 | Steve Zahn, Fran Drescher, Jack Gallagher | N/A |
Sketches include: Late Night Budget Cuts, Jewish April Fools
| 2047 | April 8, 2005 | Drew Barrymore, Dame Edna, Sarah Vowell | N/A |
Sketches include: If They Mated, Preparation H. Raymond
| 2048 | April 12, 2005 | Christian Slater, Kristen Bell, Duran Duran | N/A |
Sketches include: Late Night Staff solves the Gas Crisis, Security
| 2049 | April 13, 2005 | Jimmy Fallon, Anderson Cooper, Lewis Black | N/A |
Sketches include: Nap of the FedEx Pope, If They Mated
| 2050 | April 14, 2005 | David Duchovny, Rachel Dratch, Widespread Panic | N/A |
Sketches include: Conan takes a Stage Combat Class, Adrian Foster
| 2051 | April 15, 2005 | Jeff Goldblum, Damon Dash, Le Tigre | N/A |
| 2052 | April 26, 2005 | Michael Bloomberg, Natascha McElhone, Ben Folds | N/A |
Sketches include: Messing with the new aspect ratio, Actual Items, Star Wars Ep. III/Drug PSA recreation
| 2053 | April 27, 2005 | Ellen Barkin, Mila Kunis, The Raveonettes | N/A |
Sketches include: Messing with the new aspect ratio, Lullaby
| 2054 | April 28, 2005 | John C. Reilly, Zooey Deschanel, Todd Rundgren, Joe Jackson & ETHEL | N/A |
Sketches include: Messing with the new aspect ratio, Let Max Weinberg take your daughters to work day, New State Quarters
| 2055 | April 29, 2005 | Amanda Peet, Gene Wilder, Brian Kiley | N/A |
Sketches include: Celebrity Survey, Frankenstein waits for Gene Wilder
| 2056 | May 3, 2005 | Martin Short, Felicity Huffman, Ani Difranco | N/A |
Sketches include: Cheer Up Yankees, Conan gets hit by bricks, On the Phone with Pat O'Brien
| 2057 | May 4, 2005 | Don Cheadle, Elisha Cuthbert, Jim Gaffigan | N/A |
Sketches include: On the Phone with Pat O'Brien, SAT Analogies, Flee-ancée
| 2058 | May 5, 2005 | Hank Azaria, George Foreman, Joe Perry | N/A |
Sketches include: Extava-Conanza
| 2059 | May 6, 2005 | Jet Li, Jennifer Esposito, Amos Lee | N/A |
Sketches include: Extrava-Conanza II, Max Weinberg got abducted!
| 2060 | May 10, 2005 | Matt Dillon, Al Roker, Fall Out Boy | N/A |
Sketches include: Kids Drawings, Yankees Fan in the Audience
| 2061 | May 11, 2005 | Ryan Phillippe, Wanda Sykes, Dave Attell | N/A |
Sketches include: New Spring Characters, Announcer Booth Temperature Changes
| 2062 | May 12, 2005 | Will Ferrell | Louis XIV |
Sketches include: Ghost Crooner Artie Kendall, Hunky Newcomer & Sloppy Loser
| 2063 | May 13, 2005 | James Spader, Quentin Tarantino, Robert Plant | N/A |
Sketches include: New Star Wars Fans Action Figures
| 2064 | May 17, 2005 | Donald Trump, Patricia Arquette, The Bravery | N/A |
Sketches include: May Sweeps
| 2065 | May 18, 2005 | Andy Richter, Matthew Fox, Nick DiPaolo | N/A |
Sketches include: Pierre Bernard Flushing Book down the toilet
| 2066 | May 19, 2005 | Amy Poehler, Christopher Meloni, Doves | N/A |
Sketches include: Jumping on the Star Wars bandwagon, New York Chicken
| 2067 | May 20, 2005 | Ted Danson, Tana Goertz, Mudvayne | N/A |
Sketches include: Spring Desk Drive, Mickey Colt, Private Eye
| 2068 | May 24, 2005 | Chris Rock, Evangeline Lilly, Billy Idol | N/A |
Sketches include: Little Jay Leno, If They Mated
| 2069 | May 25, 2005 | Senator John McCain, Amber Tamblyn, Alkaline Trio | N/A |
Sketches include: Rejected Star Wars characters, John McCain Made-for-TV Movie
| 2070 | May 26, 2005 | Adam Sandler, Barney Reed, | N/A |
Sketches include: Clutch Cargo
| 2071 | May 27, 2005 | Juliette Lewis, Bill Bellamy, M.I.A. | N/A |
Sketches include: GE Satellite Channels
| 2072 | June 7, 2005 | Cedric the Entertainer, Michael Palin, Better Than Ezra | N/A |
Sketches include: Actual Items, Hearing Thoughts
| 2073 | June 8, 2005 | Carson Daly, George Lopez, Kaiser Chiefs | N/A |
Sketches include: Celebrity Survey, Preparation H. Raymond
| 2074 | June 9, 2005 | Russell Crowe, Kristin Davis, Len Berman | N/A |
| 2075 | June 10, 2005 | Christina Applegate, Regina Hall, Black Eyed Peas | N/A |
Sketches include: The Late Night staff Helps Solve the Army Recruitment Crisis
| 2076 | June 14, 2005 | Rudolph Giuliani, Colin Quinn, Bloc Party | N/A |
Michael Jackson Motorcade, Clutch Cargo, Preparation H. for Kids, Rudy Giuliani Made-For-TV Movie
| 2077 | June 15, 2005 | Matt Lauer, Mike Epps, Dr. Steven Lamm | N/A |
Sketches include: Michael Jackson Motorcade, Guest Autographs
| 2078 | June 16, 2005 | Heather Locklear, Paul Giamatti, Caesars | N/A |
Sketches include: Michael Jackson Motorcade, Ghost Crooner Artie Kendall, In the Year 2000: the Larry King edition, Conan's Biggest Fans
| 2079 | June 17, 2005 | Ethan Hawke, Carson Kressley, The Redwalls | N/A |
Sketches include: Michael Jackson Motorcade, Clutch Cargo, Trans-Species Hospital
| 2080 | June 21, 2005 | Tom Brokaw, Roger Bart, John Pizzarelli | N/A |
Sketches include: Walker Texas Ranger Lever, Clutch Cargo (Saddam Hussein), Lullaby
| 2081 | June 22, 2005 | Lindsay Lohan, David Alan Grier, Dwight Yoakam | N/A |
Sketches include: The People vs. Conan O'Brien, Walker Texas Ranger Lever
| 2082 | June 23, 2005 | Bob Costas, Justin Long, Robbie Knievel | N/A |
Sketches include: Summer Picnic Photos, Larry the Lightning Bolt
| 2083 | June 24, 2005 | Al Franken, Fountains Of Wayne, | N/A |
Sketches include: Conan on the Aisle, Fantastic!
| 2084 | July 5, 2005 | Michael Chiklis, Finesse Mitchell, Eldar | N/A |
Sketches include: Actual Items, Late Night 100 Meter Dash
| 2085 | July 6, 2005 | Jennifer Connelly, Ioan Gruffudd, Brian Regan | N/A |
Sketches include: Walker Texas Ranger Lever, Suck It Paris! T-shirts, Telephone Conversation with Queen Elizabeth and Sean Connery, Deskman & Hammerman
| 2086 | July 7, 2005 | Tony Shalhoub, Greg Giraldo, Feist | N/A |
Sketches include: New Summer Characters, Small Talk Moment (All Stars Game)
| 2087 | July 8, 2005 | Dan Aykroyd, Anthony Anderson, Aqualung | N/A |
Sketches include: Walker Texas Ranger Lever, If They Mated
| 2088 | July 12, 2005 | Scarlett Johansson, Jeffrey Tambor, The Decemberists | N/A |
Sketches include: Walker Texas Ranger Lever, Celebrity Survey
| 2089 | July 13, 2005 | Lisa Kudrow, D. J. Qualls, Loudon Wainwright III | N/A |
Sketches include: Expanding Our Demographic, Pierre Bernard's Recliner of Rage (Action Figures)
| 2090 | July 14, 2005 | Brian Williams, Jason Ritter, Rob Zombie | N/A |
| 2091 | July 15, 2005 | Owen Wilson, Caroline Rhea, The Wallflowers | N/A |
| 2092 | July 19, 2005 | Billy Bob Thornton, Patton Oswalt, The Hold Steady | N/A |
| 2093 | July 20, 2005 | Michael Clarke Duncan, Carlos Mencia, Yerba Buena | N/A |
Sketches include: Walker Texas Ranger Lever
| 2094 | July 21, 2005 | John Leguizamo, John Tesh, Christy Martin | N/A |
| 2095 | July 22, 2005 | Tim Robbins, Isla Fisher, Common | N/A |
| 2096 | August 2, 2005 | Jarod Miller, Benjamin McKenzie, David Feldman | N/A |
| 2097 | August 3, 2005 | Denis Leary, Kevin Nealon, David Gray | N/A |
| 2098 | August 4, 2005 | Johnny Knoxville, John O'Hurley, Dressy Bessy | N/A |
| 2099 | August 5, 2005 | Jeff Goldblum, Marc Maron | North Mississippi Allstars |
Sketches include: Palmeiro Steroids Scandal, Debunking The Myths of "Late Night," Napping Biker
| 2100 | August 9, 2005 | Mark Wahlberg, Bob Saget, Erin Mckeown | N/A |
| 2101 | August 10, 2005 | Kate Hudson, Paul Rudd, Keith Urban | N/A |
| 2102 | August 11, 2005 | Rob Schneider, Andre Benjamin, Louis C.K. | N/A |
| 2103 | August 12, 2005 | Eva Longoria, Tommy Lee | Del McCoury Band |
| 2104 | August 16, 2005 | Eric McCormack, Morgan Spurlock | Jason Mraz |
| 2105 | August 17, 2005 | Tom Arnold, Howie Mandel | Motion City Soundtrack |
| 2106 | August 18, 2005 | Steve Carell, Connie Nielsen | The Click Five |
| 2107 | August 19, 2005 | Heath Ledger, Jim Cramer, Gregg Rogell | N/A |
