= List of Late Night with Conan O'Brien episodes (season 10) =

This is a list of episodes for Season 10 of Late Night with Conan O'Brien, which aired from September 3, 2002 to August 14, 2003.

== Series overview ==
Season	Episodes	Originally aired	
Season	Episodes	First aired	Last aired
1	230	September 13, 1993	September 9, 1994
2	229	September 12, 1994	September 8, 1995
3	195	September 11, 1995	September 13, 1996
4	162	September 17, 1996	August 22, 1997
5	170	September 9, 1997	August 28, 1998
6	160	September 15, 1998	August 20, 1999
7	153	September 7, 1999	August 18, 2000
8	145	September 5, 2000	August 17, 2001
9	160	September 4, 2001	August 16, 2002
10	160	September 3, 2002	August 15, 2003
11	153	September 3, 2003	August 13, 2004
12	166	August 31, 2004	August 19, 2005
13	162	September 6, 2005	August 30, 2006
14	195	September 5, 2006	August 31, 2007
15	163	September 4, 2007	August 29, 2008
16	98	September 2, 2008	February 20, 2009

== Season 10 ==
No.	Original release date	Guest(s)	Musical/entertainment guest(s)
1629	September 3, 2002	Denis Leary, Eve	Violent Femmes
1630	September 4, 2002	Janeane Garofalo, Tom Kenny	N/A
1631	September 5, 2002	Jeff Goldblum, John Miller	...And You Will Know Us By The Trail Of Dead
1632	September 6, 2002	Topher Grace, Jamie-Lynn Sigler	Kevin Brennan
1633	September 10, 2002	Jimmy Fallon, Amanda Peet	Blindside
1634	September 11, 2002	Carson Daly, Sarah Vowell	Joan Osborne
1635	September 12, 2002	Ice-T, Joey Fatone	Bruce McCulloch
1636	September 13, 2002	Al Franken, Jason Lee	Superdrag
1637	September 24, 2002	Marisa Tomei, Jim Breuer	Sparta
1638	September 25, 2002	Jackie Chan, Marlo Thomas	Ricky Jay
1639	September 26, 2002	Tina Fey, Joe Pantoliano	Coldplay
1640	September 27, 2002	Jill Hennessy, Clyde Peeling	Peter Gabriel
1641	October 1, 2002	Anthony Hopkins, David Alan Grier	Naked Trucker
1642	October 2, 2002	Luke Perry, Alyson Hannigan	Bonnie Raitt
1643	October 3, 2002	Matt Damon, Rita Wilson	Jurassic 5
1644	October 4, 2002	Martin Sheen, Donnie Wahlberg	Good Charlotte
1645	October 8, 2002	Tom Cavanagh, Rachel Dratch	Tom Petty & The Heartbreakers
1646	October 9, 2002	Susan Sarandon, George Stephanopoulos	Jimmy Carr
1647	October 10, 2002	Sarah Michelle Gellar, Jason Statham	Otis Lee Crenshaw
1648	October 11, 2002	Jon Bon Jovi & Richie Sambora, Jennifer Esposito	Trust Company
1649	October 15, 2002	Dave Chappelle, Seth Green	Badly Drawn Boy
1650	October 16, 2002	Greg Kinnear, Billy Connolly, Mike Lupica	N/A
1651	October 17, 2002	Senator John McCain, Katie Holmes	N/A
1652	October 18, 2002	Johnny Knoxville, Richard Lewis	David Bowie
1653	October 29, 2002	Ted Danson, Steven Schirripa	Beck
1654	October 30, 2002	Julianna Margulies, D. L. Hughley	Sleater-Kinney
1655	October 31, 2002	Salma Hayek, Bill Bellamy	The Flaming Lips
1656	November 1, 2002	Eric McCormack, Mykelti Williamson, Alexandra Pelosi	N/A
1657	November 6, 2002	Rebecca Romijn-Stamos, Dennis Haysbert	Spoon
1658	November 7, 2002	Harry Connick, Jr., Amy Poehler	N/A
1659	November 8, 2002	Julianne Moore, Simon Baker	Blues Traveler
1660	November 12, 2002	Robin Williams	The Other Ones
1661	November 13, 2002	Regis Philbin, Ja Rule	Kevin McDonald
1662	November 14, 2002	Tom Arnold, Tom Everett Scott	Mark Knopfler
1663	November 15, 2002	Zach Braff, Jeri Ryan	Rhett Miller
1664	November 19, 2002	Rudolph Giuliani, Tyra Banks, Zach Galifianakis	N/A
1665	November 20, 2002	Tom Brokaw, Harry Shearer, Dan Castellaneta	N/A
1666	November 21, 2002	Adam Sandler, Jim Gaffigan,	N/A
1667	November 22, 2002	Aaron Buerge, Ice Cube, Matchbox Twenty	N/A
1668	November 26, 2002	Caroline Rhea, Mark Feuerstein, The Soundtrack Of Our Lives	N/A
1669	November 27, 2002	Andy Richter, Snoop Dogg, Brian "the Rocket Guy" Walker	N/A
1670	November 28, 2002	John Tesh, Sarah Chalke, Chris Robinson	N/A
1671	November 29, 2002	Lisa Kudrow, Dondre T. Whitfield, The Roots	N/A
1672	December 10, 2002	Rob Schneider, Henry Winkler, Sheryl Crow	N/A
1673	December 11, 2002	Al Gore, Bruce Springsteen & The E Street Band,	N/A
1674	December 12, 2002	Patrick Stewart, John Leguizamo, The Brian Setzer Orchestra	N/A
1675	December 13, 2002	Martin Scorsese, Paget Brewster, Tony Bennett & k.d. lang	N/A
1676	December 17, 2002	Barbara Walters, Colin Quinn, Los Straitjackets	N/A
1677	December 18, 2002	Al Franken, Nick Cannon, Dave Matthews Band	N/A
1678	December 19, 2002	John Cusack, Jamie Kennedy, John Mayer	N/A
1679	December 20, 2002	Hugh Grant, Lauren Graham, Bill Bailey	N/A
1680	December 26, 2002	Roberto Benigni, Delbert McClinton	N/A
1681	December 27, 2002	Rosie Perez, Seth Meyers, Jimmy Carr	N/A
1682	December 31, 2002	Darrell Hammond, Sarah Vowell, Paul F. Tompkins	N/A
1683	January 1, 2003	Brian Williams, Marc Maron	Hairspray
1684	January 2, 2003	Ray Liotta, Maggie Gyllenhaal	Burning Brides
1685	January 3, 2003	Nathan Lane, Sean Astin	Trachtenburg Family Slideshow Players
1686	January 14, 2003	Martin Lawrence, Michael Rosenbaum	Thievery Corporation
1687	January 15, 2003	Senator Joe Lieberman, Rosario Dawson	Boothby Graffoe (Stand-Up)
1688	January 16, 2003	Tom Selleck, Big Show, Sue Johanson	x
1689	January 17, 2003	Allison Janney, Ryan Seacrest	Sean Paul
1690	January 21, 2003	Dave Chappelle, Wilmer Valderrama	Jason Mraz
1691	January 22, 2003	Claire Danes, Simon Cowell	Greg Giraldo (Stand-Up)
1692	January 23, 2003	Dylan McDermott, Penn & Teller	Laura Cantrell
1693	January 24, 2003	Alan Cumming, Maya Rudolph	Morcheeba
1694	January 28, 2003	Ellen DeGeneres, MC Hammer	Simple Plan
1695	January 29, 2003	Peter Falk, Bridget Moynahan	Shaolin Monks
1696	January 30, 2003	Heather Graham, Sam Rockwell, Russell Simmons	x
1697	January 31, 2003	LL Cool J, Joe Pantoliano	Neil Finn
1698	February 4, 2003	Tom Cavanagh, Patton Oswalt	Kenny Chesney
1699	February 5, 2003	Roseanne Barr, Chuck Barris	Dave Attell (Stand-Up)
1700	February 6, 2003	Matthew McConaughey, Karolina Kurkova, Hunter S. Thompson	x
1701	February 7, 2003	Tom Brokaw, Rachel Dratch	Supergrass
1702	February 11, 2003	Brendan Fraser, Tiffani-Amber Thiessen	Aimee Mann
1703	February 12, 2003	Heidi Klum, Goran Visnjic	Todd Lynn (Stand-Up)
1704	February 13, 2003	Jennifer Garner, Harland Williams	Ted Leo & The Pharmacists
1705	February 14, 2003	Kurt Russell, Molly Shannon	Smilez & Southstar
1706	February 18, 2003	Christopher Walken, Laura Prepon	Nada Surf
1707	February 19, 2003	Carson Daly, Chris Elliott	Beck
1708	February 20, 2003	Luke Wilson, Rachel Griffiths	Paul Weller
1709	February 21, 2003	Will Ferrell, Philip Seymour Hoffman	Jim Gaffigan (Stand-Up)
1710	February 25, 2003	Tina Fey, Jack Osbourne & Kelly Osbourne	The Chieftains with Earl Scruggs
1711	February 26, 2003	Dana Carvey, John Ritter	Ted Nugent
1712	February 27, 2003	Chazz Palminteri, Ali G	Robinella and the CCstringband
1713	February 28, 2003	Tom Arnold, Ann Curry	The Coral
1714	March 4, 2003	Adrien Brody, Colin Quinn	The Donnas
1715	March 5, 2003	Al Roker, Ana Gasteyer	Demetri Martin (Stand-Up)
1716	March 6, 2003	Queen Latifah, Jason Schwartzman, Dennis M. Hope	x
1717	March 7, 2003	Ice-T, Mena Suvari	The Raveonettes
1718	March 11, 2003	Joshua Jackson, Grant Rosenmeyer	The Datsuns
1719	March 12, 2003	Frankie Muniz, Geri Halliwell, Veronica Vera	x
1720	March 13, 2003	Salma Hayek, Scott Wolf	Eugene Mirman (Stand-Up)
1721	March 14, 2003	Crispin Glover, Horatio Sanz	The Ataris
1722	March 25, 2003	Ringo Starr, Eddie Izzard	Ringo Starr
1723	March 26, 2003	Jarod Miller (Animal Expert), D. J. Qualls, Jesse James,	x
1724	March 27, 2003	Robert Duvall, Wanda Sykes	Sum 41
1725	March 28, 2003	Chris Rock, Sofia Vergara	Everclear
1726	April 1, 2003	Roger Moore, Eddie Griffin	Dar Williams
1727	April 2, 2003	Colin Farrell, Michael Palin, Anthony Swofford	x
1728	April 3, 2003	Patricia Heaton, Patton Oswalt	Finch
1729	April 4, 2003	Vin Diesel, Shannen Doherty	Leo Allen (Stand-Up)
1730	April 8, 2003	Holly Hunter, Eugene Levy	The Mooney Suzuki
1731	April 9, 2003	Dennis Miller, John Corbett, Adam Glasser	x
1732	April 10, 2003	Adam Sandler	Sahara Hotnights
1733	April 11, 2003	Seann William Scott, Luis Guzman	Joe Jackson
1734	April 22, 2003	Ray Liotta, Bill Bellamy	The White Stripes
1735	April 23, 2003	Edward Burns, Jaime King	The White Stripes
1736	April 24, 2003	Matt Dillon, Mariska Hargitay	The White Stripes
1737	April 25, 2003	John Cusack, Regina Hall	The White Stripes
1738	April 29, 2003	Julia Louis-Dreyfus, Donal Logue	Peter Cincotti
1739	April 30, 2003	Bob Costas, Rachel Weisz	Lewis Black (Stand-Up)
1740	May 1, 2003	John Malkovich, Jeff Richards	The Used
1741	May 2, 2003	Bill Maher, Yoko Ono	Nigella Lawson (Cooking)
1742	May 6, 2003	Alan Cumming, Mekhi Phifer	Bone Crusher
1743	May 7, 2003	Jim Belushi, Steve Zahn	Andy Blitz (Stand-Up)
1744	May 8, 2003	Marisa Tomei, Paul Rudd, John Freyer	x
1745	May 9, 2003	David Hyde Pierce, Craig Ferguson	Yeah Yeah Yeahs
1746	May 13, 2003	Darrell Hammond, Emily Procter	Alkaline Trio
1747	May 14, 2003	Anthony Edwards, Jane Kaczmarek	Tom Papa (Stand-Up)
1748	May 15, 2003	(Clay Animation Show), Johnny Knoxville, Richard Lewis	David Bowie
1749	May 16, 2003	Dan Aykroyd, George Lopez	Dropkick Murphys
1750	May 20, 2003	Tyra Banks, Marc Maron	Live
1751	May 21, 2003	Mark Wahlberg, Jeri Ryan	Queens Of The Stone Age
1752	May 22, 2003	Jim Carrey, Eliza Dushku, Regena Thomashauer	x
1753	May 23, 2003	Charlize Theron, Ryan Reynolds	Longwave
1754	June 3, 2003	Tom Cavanagh, Sienna Miller	Rosanne Cash
1755	June 4, 2003	Jerry Lewis, Harland Williams	Buddy Guy
1756	June 5, 2003	Caroline Rhea, Jamie Kennedy, David Feherty	x
1757	June 6, 2003	Seth Green, Eddie Izzard	John Mellencamp
1758	June 10, 2003	Julianna Margulies, D. L. Hughley	Jewel
1759	June 11, 2003	Josh Hartnett, Patton Oswalt, Sarah Vowell	x
1760	June 12, 2003	Lauren Graham, Isaac Hayes	Kasey Chambers
1761	June 13, 2003	Harrison Ford, Kelly Clarkson	John Pizzarelli
1762	June 17, 2003	Magic Johnson, Tom Green	Jim Gaffigan (Stand-Up)
1763	June 18, 2003	Kate Hudson, Dale Earnhardt Jr.	O.A.R.
1764	June 19, 2003	Kim Cattrall, Eric Bana, Stephen Koch	x
1765	June 20, 2003	Luke Wilson, Jeff Garlin	Solomon Burke
1766	June 24, 2003	Jennifer Connelly, Amy Sedaris	Huey Lewis and the News
1767	June 25, 2003	Clyde Peeling (Animal Expert), Simon Cowell, Wendy Northcutt	x
1768	June 26, 2003	Cameron Diaz, Drew Barrymore, Lucy Liu	Gillian Welch
1769	June 27, 2003	Reese Witherspoon, Stephen Colbert	Gang Starr
1770	July 8, 2003	Fran Drescher, Jake Johannsen	Soozie Tyrell
1771	July 9, 2003	Carson Daly, Jennifer Coolidge	Josh Kelley
1772	July 10, 2003	David Copperfield, Jack Osbourne	Jesse Harris
1773	July 11, 2003	Rachel Dratch, Liev Schreiber, Rich Hall	x
1774	July 15, 2003	Antonio Banderas, Zoe Saldaña	Big Sandy & His Fly-Rite Boys
1775	July 16, 2003	Kevin Pollak, Andy Roddick	Blur
1776	July 17, 2003	Martin Lawrence, Mandy Moore, Joe Buck	x
1777	July 18, 2003	Allison Janney, Ron Livingston	Hot Hot Heat
1778	July 22, 2003	Lisa Marie Presley, Evan Handler	Damien Rice
1779	July 23, 2003	John Leguizamo, Anna Paquin	Louis C.K. (Stand-Up)
1780	July 24, 2003	Joaquin Phoenix, Scott Thompson	Cheap Trick
1781	July 25, 2003	Sylvester Stallone, Bill Bellamy	Train
1782	August 5, 2003	Seann William Scott, Olivier Martinez	The Jayhawks
1783	August 6, 2003	Colin Farrell, Molly Shannon	Smash Mouth
1784	August 7, 2003	LL Cool J, Peter Gallagher	Greg Behrendt (Stand-Up)
1785	August 8, 2003	Denis Leary, Rocco DiSpirito	The Black Keys
1786	August 12, 2003	Sarah Jessica Parker, Paul Giamatti	Fountains Of Wayne
1787	August 13, 2003	Andy Richter, Marilyn Manson, Mick Foley	x
x	August 14, 2003	No full show due to Northeast blackout of 2003	x
1788	August 15, 2003	Al Roker, Shia LaBeouf	The Dandy Warhols
