= List of Late Night with Conan O'Brien episodes (season 8) =

This is a list of episodes for Season 8 of Late Night with Conan O'Brien, which aired from September 5, 2000, to August 17, 2001.

== Series overview ==
Season	Episodes	Originally aired	
Season	Episodes	First aired	Last aired
1	230	September 13, 1993	September 9, 1994
2	229	September 12, 1994	September 8, 1995
3	195	September 11, 1995	September 13, 1996
4	162	September 17, 1996	August 22, 1997
5	170	September 9, 1997	August 28, 1998
6	160	September 15, 1998	August 20, 1999
7	153	September 7, 1999	August 18, 2000
8	145	September 5, 2000	August 17, 2001
9	160	September 4, 2001	August 16, 2002
10	160	September 3, 2002	August 15, 2003
11	153	September 3, 2003	August 13, 2004
12	166	August 31, 2004	August 19, 2005
13	162	September 6, 2005	August 30, 2006
14	195	September 5, 2006	August 31, 2007
15	163	September 4, 2007	August 29, 2008
16	98	September 2, 2008	February 20, 2009

== Season 8 ==
No.	Original release date	Guest(s)	Musical/entertainment guest(s)
1312	September 5, 2000	Jarod Miller, Craig Ferguson	Bebel Gilberto
1313	September 6, 2000	Al Franken, Judge Mills Lane, Jann Wenner	N/A
1314	September 7, 2000	Richard Hatch, Ryan Phillippe, Fred Armisen	N/A
1315	September 8, 2000	Juliette Lewis, Donal Logue,	N/A
1316	September 12, 2000	Eugene Levy	Barenaked Ladies
1318	September 14, 2000	Jamie Foxx, Senator Joe Lieberman,	N/A
1319	September 15, 2000	Tim Robbins, Queen Latifah	Fastball
1320	October 3, 2000	George Foreman, Michael Rapaport	The Corrs
1321	October 4, 2000	Joshua Jackson, Malachy McCourt,	N/A
1322	October 5, 2000	Jonathan Katz, Jackie Chan,	N/A
1323	October 6, 2000	Kate Hudson, Rulon Gardner	Elastica
1324	October 10, 2000	Andy Richter, Steve Buscemi,	Black Eyed Peas
1325	October 11, 2000	Larry David, Lewis Black	N/A
1326	October 12, 2000	Steve Martin, Henry Winkler, Marc Maron	N/A
1327	October 13, 2000	Tim Meadows	Dandy Warhols
1328	October 17, 2000	James Caan, Anthony Clark, The Max Weinberg Seven	N/A
1329	October 18, 2000	Bob Costas, Lucy Lawless, Jeff Garlin	N/A
1330	October 19, 2000	Dana Carvey, Melina Kanakaredes	N/A
1331	October 20, 2000	Ice-T, Melina Kanakaredes	Emmylou Harris
1332	October 31, 2000	Michael Richards, Jimmy Blaylock	At the Drive-In
1333	November 1, 2000	Tom Everett Scott, Mike Lupica,	N/A
1334	November 2, 2000	Matt Stone & Trey Parker, John Leguizamo,	N/A
1335	November 3, 2000	John Tesh, Squirrel Nut Zippers,	N/A
1336	November 8, 2000	Regis Philbin, Lauren Graham, Lewis Black	N/A
1337	November 9, 2000	Adam Sandler, Al Franken, Badly Drawn Boy	N/A
1338	November 10, 2000	Eric McCormack, Allen Covert	Blur
1339	November 14, 2000	David Hasselhoff	Queens of the Stone Age
1340	November 15, 2000	Heather Locklear, Maura Tierney, Frank McCourt	N/A
1341	November 16, 2000	Mick Foley, Dwayne Kennedy,	N/A
1342	November 17, 2000	Gwyneth Paltrow, R. L. Burnside,	N/A
1343	November 21, 2000	Jarod Miller, Susan Lucci	Orgy
1344	November 22, 2000	Rudolph Giuliani, Isaac Hayes,	N/A
1345	November 23, 2000	Al Roker, David Blaine	Deftones
1346	November 24, 2000	Chris Elliott, Meredith Vieira,	N/A
1347	November 28, 2000	Noah Wyle, Louis C.K.	Dan Hicks
1349	November 30, 2000	Jeremy Irons, Billy Connolly, Sarah Vowell	N/A
1350	December 1, 2000	Katie Holmes	Lynyrd Skynyrd
1351	December 12, 2000	Mark Feuerstein, Flogging Molly,	N/A
1352	December 13, 2000	Sarah Silverman, Nancy Cartwright, Bradley Whitford	N/A
1353	December 14, 2000	Jeri Ryan, Tony Bennett,	N/A
1354	December 15, 2000	Helen Hunt, Craig Bierko, Bill Braudis	N/A
1355	December 19, 2000	Tim Russert, Julie Warner	Three Doors Down
1356	December 20, 2000	Dweezil & Ahmet Zappa,	N/A
1358	December 22, 2000	Tom Hanks, Kelly Ripa,	N/A
1359	December 26, 2000	Willem Dafoe, Jennifer Esposito	Southern Culture on the Skids
1360	December 27, 2000	Brian Williams, Artie Lange	Jill Scott
1361	December 28, 2000	David Alan Grier, Dick Clark, Amy Sedaris	N/A
1362	December 29, 2000	Caroline Rhea, Brian Posehn, Will Kimbrough	N/A
1364	January 3, 2001	Lorraine Bracco, Benicio del Toro, Andy Blitz	N/A
1365	January 4, 2001	Jud Hale,	N/A
1366	January 5, 2001	Meredith Vieira,	N/A
1367	January 9, 2001	Charlie Sheen, Tim Blake Nelson	Ricky Skaggs & Bruce Hornsby
1368	January 10, 2001	Mayor Rudolph Giuliani, Jim Gaffigan, Robert Smigel	N/A
1369	January 11, 2001	Dennis Quaid, Joy Behar, Greg Fitzsimmons	N/A
1370	January 12, 2001	Mira Sorvino, Richard Lewis, Shemekia Copeland	N/A
1371	January 16, 2001	Julia Stiles, Marla Sokoloff	Linkin Park
1372	January 17, 2001	Kevin Pollak, Frank Caliendo,	N/A
1373	January 18, 2001	Tiki Barber, Jud Hale, Christopher Meloni	N/A
1374	January 19, 2001	Clyde Peeling, Eddie Izzard, Dar Williams	N/A
1375	January 30, 2001	William Shatner, Denise Richards, John Pizzarelli	N/A
1376	January 31, 2001	Chyna, Wanda Sykes,	N/A
1377	February 1, 2001	Dolly Parton, Donal Logue,	N/A
1380	February 7, 2001	Gina Gershon, John Waters, Robert Siegel	N/A
1382	February 9, 2001	Rachel Dratch, Josh Joplin Group,	N/A
1383	February 13, 2001	Bob Costas, Jessica Alba,	N/A
1384	February 14, 2001	Ashton Kutcher, Prince Naseem Hamed,	N/A
1385	February 15, 2001	Chris Rock	They Might Be Giants
1386	February 16, 2001	Tina Fey	Coldplay
1387	February 20, 2001	Chazz Palminteri	N/A
1388	February 21, 2001	Louis C.K.,	N/A
1389	February 22, 2001	Katie Holmes, Rhea Perlman, Marc Maron	N/A
1392	February 28, 2001	Mike Myers, Ed Burns	Doves
1393	March 1, 2001	Heidi Klum, Jill Hennessy, Chris Carter	N/A
1394	March 2, 2001	Edie Falco, Snoop Dogg,	N/A
1395	March 13, 2001	Gary Sinise, Bill Bellamy, The Minus Five	N/A
1396	March 14, 2001	Ray Liotta, Dave Chappelle, Chef Carl Redding	N/A
1397	March 15, 2001	David Copperfield, Tom Arnold	N/A
1399	March 20, 2001	Denis Leary, Brooke Smith	The Living End
1400	March 21, 2001	Harry Connick Jr., Carla Gugino	N/A
1401	March 22, 2001	Jennifer Love Hewitt, Solomon Burke,	N/A
1402	March 23, 2001	Antonio Banderas, Tony Randall, Greg Giraldo	N/A
1403	April 3, 2001	Sigourney Weaver, Alan Cumming	Old 97's
1404	April 4, 2001	D. L. Hughley, Anna Quindlen,	N/A
1405	April 5, 2001	Brian Kiley,	N/A
1406	April 6, 2001	Paul Reubens, Eliza Carthy,	N/A
1407	April 10, 2001	Damon Wayans, Laura Prepon, Dave Attell	N/A
1408	April 11, 2001	Scott Thompson, Tara Reid	Spacehog
1409	April 12, 2001	Renée Zellweger, Chris Titus, James Lipton	N/A
1410	April 13, 2001	Tom Green, Donal Logue	Vertical Horizon
1411	April 17, 2001	Paul Hogan, Brittany Daniel, Lewis Black	N/A
1412	April 18, 2001	Carson Daly, Artie Lange,	N/A
1413	April 19, 2001	LL Cool J, Jeri Ryan, Regena Thomashauer	N/A
1414	April 20, 2001	Anne Robinson, Camryn Manheim, Swag	N/A
1415	April 24, 2001	Lorraine Bracco, Kelli Williams	Jim White
1416	April 25, 2001	Andy Dick, Thomas Jane, Amy Correia	N/A
1417	April 26, 2001	Liv Tyler, Mark Addy, Patton Oswalt	N/A
1418	April 27, 2001	Matt Dillon	Our Lady Peace
1419	May 1, 2001	Matt Lauer, George Carlin, Shuggie Otis	N/A
1420	May 2, 2001	Caroline Rhea, Robert Patrick, Gene Pompa	N/A
1421	May 3, 2001	Brendan Fraser, Ana Gasteyer, Sarah Vowell	N/A
1422	May 4, 2001	Sting, Allison Janney, Jonatha Brooke	N/A
1423	May 8, 2001	Darrell Hammond, Jane Kaczmarek, Shea Seger	N/A
1424	May 9, 2001	Martha Stewart, Kevin Nealon, Amy Sedaris	N/A
1425	May 10, 2001	Lara Flynn Boyle, George Foreman, Rodney Crowell	N/A
1426	May 11, 2001	Juliette Lewis, Peter Boyle	Tantric
1427	May 15, 2001	Matthew Broderick, Bradley Whitford	The Go-Go's
1428	May 16, 2001	Charlie Sheen, Jessica Alba, Laura Kightlinger	N/A
1429	May 17, 2001	Kathie Lee Gifford, Leah Remini,	N/A
1430	May 18, 2001	Will Ferrell, Jarod Miller, H2O,	N/A
1431	May 22, 2001	John Lithgow, Steven Schirripa,	N/A
1432	May 23, 2001	Chris Isaak, Peri Gilpin	Ike Turner
1433	May 24, 2001	Rob Schneider, Tom Sizemore	Rufus Wainwright
1434	May 25, 2001	Eric McCormack,	N/A
1435	June 5, 2001	Dave Chappelle, Molly Sims	Weezer
1436	June 6, 2001	David Duchovny, Al Franken, Frank McCourt	N/A
1437	June 7, 2001	Regis Philbin, Bernie Mac	Idlewild
1438	June 8, 2001	Alan Cumming, Orlando Jones, Paul Pena	N/A
1439	June 12, 2001	Tom Brokaw, Marc Maron	Soggy Bottom Boys
1441	June 14, 2001	John Leguizamo,	N/A
1441	June 15, 2001	Tony Danza, Richard Schiff, Ron Sexsmith	N/A
1442	June 19, 2001	Martin Short, Michael Rapaport, Dominic Chianese	N/A
1443	June 20, 2001	John Leguizamo, Kurt Angle, Nick Swardson	N/A
1444	June 21, 2001	Jon Lovitz, Lucy Lawless, Rich Hall	N/A
1445	June 22, 2001	Andy Richter, Seth Green, Dave Navarro	N/A
1446	June 27, 2001	Bridget Fonda, Kevin Pollak, Louis C.K.	N/A
1447	June 28, 2001	Marlon Wayans, Don Zimmer	Green Day
1448	June 29, 2001	Dikembe Mutombo, Michael Badalucco	Kathleen Madigan
1450	July 10, 2001	James Woods, Selma Blair	Scout
1451	July 11, 2001	Penn & Teller, Sarah Silverman, Nick Hornby	N/A
1452	July 12, 2001	Reese Witherspoon, Brian Setzer,	N/A
1453	July 13, 2001	Julianna Margulies, Tim Stack, Regena Thomashauer	N/A
1454	July 17, 2001	Al Roker,	N/A
1455	July 18, 2001	William H. Macy	N/A
1456	July 19, 2001	Billy Crystal	N/A
1457	July 24, 2001	Shaquille O'Neal, Piper Perabo, Joe Strummer	N/A
1458	July 25, 2001	Clyde Peeling, Jordana Brewster, Brian Wilson	N/A
1459	July 26, 2001	Janeane Garofalo, Tim Roth, Dom DeLuise	N/A
1460	July 27, 2001	Luke Perry, John Cameron Mitchell	Blues Traveler
1461	August 7, 2001	Christopher Walken, Goran Višnjić, The World	N/A
1462	August 8, 2001	Darrell Hammond, Alyson Hannigan, Dave Attell	N/A
1463	August 9, 2001	Helen Hunt, Seann William Scott, David Rakoff	N/A
1464	August 10, 2001	Andy Dick, Paul Giamatti	Slipknot
1465	August 14, 2001	Fabio Lanzoni, Seth Green,	N/A
1466	August 15, 2001	Cuba Gooding Jr., Matthew Lillard	N/A
1467	August 16, 2001	Mira Sorvino, Jim Breuer	Train
1468	August 17, 2001	Caroline Rhea, Kevin Smith, Russ Meneve	N/A
