= List of Late Night with Conan O'Brien episodes (season 13) =

This is a list of episodes for Season 13 of Late Night with Conan O'Brien, which aired from September 6, 2005, to September 15, 2006.

== Series overview ==
Season	Episodes	Originally aired	
Season	Episodes	First aired	Last aired
1	230	September 13, 1993	September 9, 1994
2	229	September 12, 1994	September 8, 1995
3	195	September 11, 1995	September 13, 1996
4	162	September 17, 1996	August 22, 1997
5	170	September 9, 1997	August 28, 1998
6	160	September 15, 1998	August 20, 1999
7	153	September 7, 1999	August 18, 2000
8	145	September 5, 2000	August 17, 2001
9	160	September 4, 2001	August 16, 2002
10	160	September 3, 2002	August 15, 2003
11	153	September 3, 2003	August 13, 2004
12	166	August 31, 2004	August 19, 2005
13	162	September 6, 2005	August 30, 2006
14	195	September 5, 2006	August 31, 2007
15	163	September 4, 2007	August 29, 2008
16	98	September 2, 2008	February 20, 2009

== Season 13 ==
No.	Original release date	Guest(s)	Musical/entertainment guest(s)
2108	September 6, 2005	Christina Applegate, Artie Lange	Thirty Seconds to Mars
2109	September 7, 2005	Samuel L. Jackson, Richard Lewis	Brad Paisley
2110	September 8, 2005	John Lithgow, Eugene Levy, Flight of the Conchords	N/A
2111	September 9, 2005	Elijah Wood, Michael Rapaport, Brian Regan	N/A
2112	September 13, 2005	Gwyneth Paltrow, Peter Falk,	Switchfoot
2113	September 14, 2005	Anthony Hopkins, Caroline Rhea, Mick Foley	N/A
2114	September 15, 2005	Sacha Baron Cohen, Liev Schreiber, Jim Gaffigan	N/A
2115	September 16, 2005	Lara Flynn Boyle, Steve Schirripa	The New Pornographers
2116	September 20, 2005	Jason Lee, Harland Williams, Jimeoin	N/A
2117	September 21, 2005	Ice-T, Erika Christensen, Steve Winwood	N/A
2118	September 22, 2005	Kim Cattrall, Seth Meyers, David Rakoff	N/A
2119	September 23, 2005	Ricky Gervais, Stephen King, Nickel Creek	N/A
2120	September 27, 2005	Martha Stewart, Big Show, Death Cab for Cutie	N/A
2121	September 28, 2005	Matt LeBlanc, Amanda Bynes, Jud Hale	N/A
2122	September 29, 2005	Jessica Alba, Jeff Garlin, Sheryl Crow	N/A
2123	September 30, 2005	Tiger Woods, Amy Poehler, Against Me!	N/A
2124	October 4, 2005	Freddie Prinze Jr., Jennifer Esposito, Matt Pond PA	N/A
2125	October 5, 2005	Matthew McConaughey, Jesse Eisenberg, Greg Behrendt	N/A
2126	October 6, 2005	U2,	N/A
2127	October 7, 2005	Jon Heder, Jessica Biel, Nada Surf	N/A
2128	October 11, 2005	Rosie O'Donnell, Chris Elliott, Jamie Cullum	N/A
2129	October 12, 2005	Charlize Theron, Cameron Crowe, Tariq "King Flex" Nasheed	N/A
2130	October 13, 2005	Darrell Hammond, Jason Schwartzman, My Morning Jacket	N/A
2131	October 14, 2005	Dolly Parton, Molly Sims,	N/A
2132	October 18, 2005	John Leguizamo, Joy Behar, Dungen	N/A
2133	October 19, 2005	James Woods, Joy Behar, Shawn King	N/A
2134	October 20, 2005	Val Kilmer, Gabrielle Union, Mark Leyner	N/A
2135	October 21, 2005	Dwayne "the Rock" Johnson, Andrea Mitchell, Ric Ocasek	N/A
2136	November 1, 2005	Brian Williams, Susie Essman, Neil Young	N/A
2137	November 2, 2005	Philip Seymour Hoffman, John Krasinski, Neil Young	N/A
2138	November 3, 2005	Jake Gyllenhaal, Neil Young,	N/A
2139	November 4, 2005	David Spade, Xzibit, Neil Young	N/A
2140	November 8, 2005	Jennifer Aniston, 50 Cent, Dan Naturman	N/A
-	November 9, 2005	-	N/A
November 9 episode was cancelled due to the birth of Conan O’Brien’s son. Scheduled as guests were Sarah Silverman, Patti Smith and Donald Trump. A rerun of show No. 2062 aired instead.
2141	November 10, 2005	Robert Downey Jr., Steve Irwin	N/A
2142	November 11, 2005	Keira Knightley, Nicole Richie, Green Day	N/A
2143	November 15, 2005	Reese Witherspoon, Jon Favreau, Kevin Brennan	N/A
2144	November 16, 2005	Rosario Dawson, Steve Harvey, Big & Rich	N/A
2145	November 17, 2005	Joaquin Phoenix, Sarah Silverman, Trey Anastasio	N/A
2146	November 18, 2005	Patricia Heaton, Ryan Reynolds, Alanis Morissette	N/A
2147	November 22, 2005	Usher, Colin Quinn, Pink Martini	N/A
Act 2 Sketch: In The Year 2000 with "The Moviefone Guy"
2148	November 23, 2005	Peter Gallagher, Rainn Wilson, Demetri Martin	N/A
2149	November 24, 2005	Al Franken, Lake Bell, Ray Davies	N/A
2150	November 25, 2005	Jerry Lewis, Finesse Mitchell, Gogol Bordello	N/A
2151	November 29, 2005	Tom Arnold, The Brian Setzer Orchestra,	N/A
2152	November 30, 2005	Naomi Watts, The Magic Numbers,	N/A
2153	December 1, 2005	Alan Alda, Billy Joel,	N/A
2154	December 2, 2005	Gisele Bündchen, Dane Cook, The White Stripes	N/A
2155	December 6, 2005	Adrien Brody, Anthony Anderson, Patti Smith	N/A
2156	December 7, 2005	Lindsay Lohan, Colin Hanks, Coldplay	N/A
2157	December 8, 2005	Luke Wilson, Jack Klugman, Ghost Hunters Jason Hawes & Grant Wilson	N/A
2158	December 9, 2005	Tina Fey, William Moseley, James Blunt	N/A
2159	December 13, 2005	Heidi Klum, Carson Kressley, Jake Shimabukuro	N/A
2160	December 14, 2005	Donald Trump, Emily Mortimer, Susan Tedeschi	N/A
2161	December 15, 2005	Jack Black, Rachel McAdams, Charles Ross	N/A
2162	December 16, 2005	Barbara Walters, Bill Hader, Clap Your Hands Say Yeah	N/A
2163	December 20, 2005	Jim Carrey, Isaac Hayes,	N/A
Sketches include: Transit Strike
2164	December 21, 2005	Téa Leoni, Patton Oswalt, Doris Kearns Goodwin	N/A
2165	December 22, 2005	Johnny Knoxville, Tucker Carlson, Tony Bennett	N/A
2166	December 23, 2005	Matthew Broderick, Bonnie Hunt, John Mayer Trio	N/A
2167	January 3, 2006	Quentin Tarantino, Nick Swardson, John Legend	N/A
2168	January 4, 2006	Seth Green, Andy Serkis, Rodney Crowell & Emmylou Harris	N/A
2169	January 5, 2006	Paul Giamatti, Allen Covert, Tom Papa	N/A
2170	January 6, 2006	Alan Cumming, Sarah Chalke, Living Things	N/A
2171	January 10, 2006	LL Cool J, Mo Rocca, Jimmy Carr	N/A
2172	January 11, 2006	Terrence Howard, John Daly, O.A.R.	N/A
2173	January 12, 2006	Chazz Palminteri, Emily Procter, J. W. Hart	N/A
2174	January 13, 2006	Will Arnett, Chris Parnell, Flipsyde	N/A
2175	January 17, 2006	Martin Lawrence, Eliza Dushku, Soweto Gospel Choir	N/A
2176	January 18, 2006	Josh Lucas, Marc Maron, Jen Chapin	N/A
2177	January 19, 2006	Kate Beckinsale, Brian Posehn, Metric	N/A
2178	January 20, 2006	Clyde Peeling, Nia Long, The Fray	N/A
2179	January 24, 2006	Anthony Hopkins, Piper Perabo, Marty Stuart & His Fabulous Superlatives	N/A
2180	January 25, 2006	Bob Saget, James Carville, Yellowcard	N/A
2181	January 26, 2006	Emma Thompson, Jason Priestley, Norah Vincent	N/A
2182	January 27, 2006	Steve Carell, Sanaa Lathan, Lewis Taylor	N/A
2183	January 31, 2006	Benjamin Bratt, Andy Samberg, Broken Social Scene	N/A
2184	February 1, 2006	Meredith Vieira, Jeff Probst, Jim Gaffigan	N/A
2185	February 2, 2006	Bette Midler, David Gregory,	N/A
2186	February 3, 2006	Stephen Colbert, Rick Moranis, Sarah Vowell	N/A
2187	February 7, 2006	Harrison Ford, Amy Adams, KT Tunstall	N/A
2188	February 8, 2006	Tom Cavanagh, Josh Holloway, Sigur Rós	N/A
2189	February 9, 2006	Nicollette Sheridan, Steve Coogan, Aimee Mann	N/A
2190	February 10, 2006	Rachel Weisz, Paul Bettany, Graham Bensinger	N/A
2191	February 28, 2006	Bruce Willis, Mary Lynn Rajskub, Dropkick Murphys	N/A
2192	March 1, 2006	Gisele Bündchen, Bill Bellamy, Belle and Sebastian	N/A
2193	March 2, 2006	Bob Costas, Jenna Fischer, Dwayne Perkins	N/A
2194	March 3, 2006	Alec Baldwin, Fred Goss, The Derek Trucks Band	N/A
2195	March 7, 2006	Sarah Jessica Parker, Matisyahu,	N/A
2196	March 8, 2006	Matthew McConaughey, Kristin Davis, James Hunter	N/A
2197	March 9, 2006	Salma Hayek, Eric Balfour, Street Drum Corps	N/A
2198	March 10, 2006	Finland Show,	N/A
2199	March 14, 2006	Vin Diesel, Jamie-Lynn DiScala, We Are Scientists	N/A
2200	March 15, 2006	Martha Stewart, Macaulay Culkin, Billy Bragg	N/A
2201	March 16, 2006	Amanda Peet, Bradley Cooper, Greg Fitzsimmons	N/A
2202	March 17, 2006	Lorraine Bracco, Steve Harvey, Jaheim	N/A
2203	March 28, 2006	Queen Latifah, Tim Gunn, Richard Ashcroft	N/A
2204	March 29, 2006	Ray Romano, Sue Johanson, José González	N/A
2205	March 30, 2006	Josh Hartnett, Paget Brewster, Editors	N/A
2206	March 31, 2006	Antonio Banderas, Seth Meyers	The Little Willies
2207	April 4, 2006	Amy Poehler, Steven Schirripa, She Wants Revenge	N/A
2208	April 5, 2006	Lucy Liu, Jon Lovitz, "Beer Hunter" Michael Jackson	N/A
Sketches include: No Reason To Live Guy, In The Year 2000 (Lovitz Edition)
2209	April 6, 2006	Nathan Lane, Padma Lakshmi, Kris Kristofferson	N/A
2210	April 7, 2006	Jeff Daniels, Rachael Ray, Fiona Apple	N/A
2211	April 11, 2006	Hank Azaria, Mimi Rogers, Pink	N/A
Sketches include: Celebrity Survey
2212	April 12, 2006	David Schwimmer, Patton Oswalt, Melissa Cross	N/A
Sketches include: NBC Page (Jon Glaser)
2213	April 13, 2006	Jarod Miller, Regina Hall, Teddy Thompson	N/A
2214	April 14, 2006	Julia Louis-Dreyfus, Jason Sudeikis, Daniel Powter	N/A
Sketches include: Jewish Max Weinberg 7
2215	April 25, 2006	Mandy Moore, Alexis Bledel, Secret Machines	N/A
Sketches include: Actual Items, Small Talk Moment (NFL Draft)
2216	April 26, 2006	Darrell Hammond, Reggie Bush, Eagles of Death Metal	N/A
2217	April 27, 2006	Howie Mandel, Jim Gaffigan, The Goo Goo Dolls	N/A
2218	April 28, 2006	Paul Rudd, Robert Smigel, Chris Klein, Hawthorne Heights	N/A
2219	May 2, 2006	Jeff Goldblum, Jodelle Ferland, Taking Back Sunday	N/A
2220	May 3, 2006	Jeremy Piven, Jim Cramer, The Strokes	N/A
2221	May 4, 2006	Tom Hanks, Wolfmother,	N/A
2222	May 5, 2006	Edward Norton, Izabel Goulart, Gene Pompa	N/A
Sketches include: Late Night Whale, [[Pierre Bernard (comedian)|Pierre's]] 200th Stargate SG-1 episode, Guest Who Is Always Confused About Future Guests
2223	May 9, 2006	(in Chicago) Sean Hayes	Cheap Trick
2224	May 10, 2006	(in Chicago) Dave Chappelle	Common
2225	May 11, 2006	(in Chicago) John C. Reilly, Vlasta, John Mayer	N/A
2226	May 12, 2006	(in Chicago) Barack Obama	Wilco
2227	May 16, 2006	Megan Mullally, Mike Wallace, Jewel	N/A
2228	May 17, 2006	Brian Williams, Jorge Garcia, People in Planes	N/A
2229	May 18, 2006	Edie Falco, Billy Connolly, The Raconteurs	N/A
2230	May 19, 2006	Larry King, Omar Epps, Sheila Kelley	N/A
2231	May 23, 2006	Seth Green, Lee Evans, Atmosphere	N/A
2232	May 24, 2006	Hugh Jackman, Tim Russert, Gnarls Barkley	N/A
2233	May 25, 2006	Jennifer Aniston, Harold Perrineau, Victor Varnado	N/A
2234	May 26, 2006	Halle Berry, Anderson Cooper, Peeping Tom	N/A
2235	May 29, 2006	The Best of Chicago,	N/A
2236	June 6, 2006	Eric McCormack, Famke Jannsen, Drive-By Truckers	N/A
2237	June 7, 2006	Luke Perry, Ludacris, Van Hunt	N/A
2238	June 8, 2006	Kevin Kline, Kevin Dillon, Lewis Black	N/A
2239	June 9, 2006	Denis Leary, Rita Wilson, Brandi Carlile	N/A
2240	June 13, 2006	Julia Stiles, Louis C.K., Be Your Own Pet	N/A
2241	June 14, 2006	Rosie Perez, Morgan Pressel, Regina Spektor	N/A
2242	June 15, 2006	Dane Cook, Shaun White, Dr. John	N/A
2243	June 16, 2006	Sandra Oh, Gordon Ramsay, Chris Isaak	N/A
2244	June 20, 2006	Alan Cumming, Henry Winkler, All-American Rejects	N/A
2245	June 21, 2006	Adam Sandler, John Cena, The Subways	N/A
2246	June 22, 2006	Kate Beckinsale, Tyrese Gibson, Iceberg climber Will Gadd	N/A
2247	June 23, 2006	Thomas Haden Church, Bruce Springsteen,	N/A
2248	June 27, 2006	Hilary Duff, Neil Patrick Harris, Bonnie Raitt	N/A
2249	June 28, 2006	Kevin Spacey, Todd Barry, Strays Don't Sleep	N/A
2250	June 29, 2006	Orlando Bloom, Campbell Brown, Cheap Trick	N/A
2251	June 30, 2006	Kate Bosworth, Tom Everett Scott, Arj Barker	N/A
2252	July 11, 2006	Marlon Wayans, Brian Posehn, Elvis Costello & Allen Toussaint	N/A
2253	July 12, 2006	Stephen Colbert, Rainn Wilson, Lil' Ed & The Blues Imperials	N/A
2254	July 13, 2006	Paul Reubens, Carlos Mencia, David Lee Roth	N/A
2255	July 14, 2006	Owen Wilson, Kerry Washington, Tom Papa	N/A
2256	July 18, 2006	Rosario Dawson, Kevin Pollak, Matthew Sweet & Susanna Hoffs	N/A
2257	July 19, 2006	Luke Wilson, Bryce Dallas Howard, Los Lonely Boys	N/A
2258	July 20, 2006	Uma Thurman, Kevin Smith, The New York Dolls	N/A
2259	July 21, 2006	Al Gore, Paul Giamatti	Beastie Boys
2260	August 1, 2006	Will Ferrell, Christopher Meloni, Landon Pigg	N/A
2261	August 2, 2006	John C. Reilly, Ashanti, Jackie Greene	N/A
2262	August 3, 2006	Ice-T, Tim Gunn, Body Count	N/A
2263	August 4, 2006	Martin Short, Kirk "Sticky Fingaz" Jones, Ziggy Marley	N/A
2264	August 8, 2006	Darrell Hammond, Christina Milian, Yeah Yeah Yeahs	N/A
2265	August 9, 2006	Heidi Klum, Justin Long, Sonic Youth	N/A
2266	August 10, 2006	Matt Dillon, Jonah Hill, Guster	N/A
2267	August 11, 2006	Kevin Nealon, Morgan Spurlock, Josh Ritter	N/A
2268	August 29, 2006	Donald Trump, Marc Maron, Ray LaMontagne	N/A
2269	August 30, 2006	Jarod Miller, Mary Birdsong, Neko Case	N/A
