= List of Late Night with Conan O'Brien episodes (season 11) =

This is a list of episodes for Season 11 of Late Night with Conan O'Brien, which aired from September 3, 2003, to August 13, 2004.

== Series overview ==
Season	Episodes	Originally aired	
Season	Episodes	First aired	Last aired
1	230	September 13, 1993	September 9, 1994
2	229	September 12, 1994	September 8, 1995
3	195	September 11, 1995	September 13, 1996
4	162	September 17, 1996	August 22, 1997
5	170	September 9, 1997	August 28, 1998
6	160	September 15, 1998	August 20, 1999
7	153	September 7, 1999	August 18, 2000
8	145	September 5, 2000	August 17, 2001
9	160	September 4, 2001	August 16, 2002
10	160	September 3, 2002	August 15, 2003
11	153	September 3, 2003	August 13, 2004
12	166	August 31, 2004	August 19, 2005
13	162	September 6, 2005	August 30, 2006
14	195	September 5, 2006	August 31, 2007
15	163	September 4, 2007	August 29, 2008
16	98	September 2, 2008	February 20, 2009

== Season 11 ==
No.	Original release date	Guest(s)	Musical/entertainment guest(s)
1789	September 3, 2003	Jon Lovitz, Wilmer Valderrama	Jet
1790	September 4, 2003	Gary Sinise, Seth Green, Tanya Streeter	x
1791	September 5, 2003	David Spade, Sara Rue	Jim Gaffigan (Stand-Up)
x	September 14, 2003	10th Anniversary Special. Guest appearances by Will Ferrell, Mr. T, Ben Stiller, Andy Richter and more.	Jack Black
1792	September 16, 2003	Michael Caine, Jason Biggs	Joss Stone
1793	September 17, 2003	Christina Ricci, Michael Rapaport	The Folksmen
1794	September 18, 2003	Charlie Sheen, Scarlett Johansson	My Morning Jacket
1795	September 19, 2003	Kelsey Grammer, Craig Bierko	Greg Giraldo (Stand-Up)
1796	September 23, 2003	Kevin James, Teri Polo, Ken Burns	x
1797	September 24, 2003	Whoopi Goldberg, Rosario Dawson	Eastmountainsouth
1798	September 25, 2003	Diane Lane, Wanda Sykes	Jonny Lang
1799	September 26, 2003	The Rock, Isaac Mizrahi	Robert Randolph and the Family Band
1800	September 30, 2003	Alec Baldwin, Vanessa Marcil	Rancid
1801	October 1, 2003	Val Kilmer, Carmen Electra	Todd Barry (Stand-Up)
1802	October 2, 2003	Jack Black, Christopher Walken	Staind
1803	October 3, 2003	Lisa Kudrow, Jeremy Piven	Grandaddy
1804	October 7, 2003	Kevin Bacon, Vivica A. Fox	Del McCoury Band
1805	October 8, 2003	Lucy Liu, Michael Moore	Gov't Mule
1806	October 9, 2003	Uma Thurman, Josh Lucas	North Mississippi Allstars
1807	October 10, 2003	Gwyneth Paltrow, Philip Seymour Hoffman	Howie Day
1808	October 16, 2003	Tim Robbins, Natasha Henstridge	Kaki King
1809	October 17, 2003	David Arquette, Gina Gershon	Béla Fleck and the Flecktones
1810	October 28, 2003	Norm Macdonald, Laura Prepon	Triumph the Insult Comic Dog
1811	October 29, 2003	Al Franken, Courtney Thorne-Smith	The Thrills
1812	October 30, 2003	Quentin Tarantino, Molly Sims, Chuck Palahniuk	x
1813	October 31, 2003	James Caan, David Cross	Greg Behrendt (Stand-Up)
1814	November 4, 2003	Patrick Stewart, Regina Hall	The Strokes
1815	November 5, 2003	Laurence Fishburne, Steve Schirripa	The Polyphonic Spree
1816	November 6, 2003	Will Ferrell, Chloë Sevigny, Sarah Vowell	x
1817	November 7, 2003	Darrell Hammond, Shannen Doherty	Joshua Bell
1818	November 11, 2003	Ice-T, Jenna Elfman	The Strokes
1819	November 12, 2003	Brendan Fraser, Marg Helgenberger	Ron Isley & Burt Bacharach
1820	November 13, 2003	Dolly Parton, Steve Irwin	Dolly Parton
1821	November 14, 2003	Russell Crowe, Alicia Silverstone	Andrew W.K.
1822	November 18, 2003	William H. Macy, Heidi Klum	The Strokes
1823	November 19, 2003	Elvis Costello, Eliza Dushku	Elvis Costello
1824	November 20, 2003	Billy Bob Thornton, Nick Lachey, Rob Krueger	x
1825	November 21, 2003	Lauren Graham, Steve Harvey	Dashboard Confessional
1826	November 25, 2003	Ron Howard, John Tesh	The Strokes
1827	November 26, 2003	Zach Braff, Billy Connolly	The Brian Setzer Orchestra
1828	November 27, 2003	Bernie Mac, Ben Chaplin	Thursday
1829	December 9, 2003	Brian Williams, Maggie Gyllenhaal	Jim Gaffigan (Stand-Up)
1830	December 10, 2003	Jude Law, Maggie Gyllenhaal	Michelle Branch
1831	December 11, 2003	Greg Kinnear, Bob Odenkirk, Tom Shales	x
1832	December 12, 2003	Matt Damon, Kevin Pollak	Randy Newman
1833	December 16, 2003	Kelly Ripa, Emma Bolger	Tony Bennett
1834	December 17, 2003	Elijah Wood, Estella Warren	Liz Phair
1835	December 18, 2003	Jennifer Connelly, Lewis Black, Sam Goldstein	x
1836	December 19, 2003	Natalie Portman, Bill O'Reilly	Patty Loveless
1837	December 23, 2003	Julia Stiles, Marc Maron	Mitch Hedberg (Stand-Up)
1838	December 26, 2003	Ian McKellen, Petra Němcová	The Stills
1839	December 30, 2003	Tom Brokaw, Gary Sheffield	John Mayer with Buddy Guy and Double Trouble (band)
1840	December 31, 2003	Jarod Miller, Amy Sedaris	Moby
1841	January 2, 2004	Ethan Hawke, George Wendt	Natalie MacMaster
1842	January 13, 2004	Tyra Banks, Andy Serkis	Los Lonely Boys
1843	January 14, 2004	Benicio del Toro, Richard Lewis	Maroon 5
1844	January 15, 2004	Ben Stiller, Sarah, Duchess of York, Rich Hall	x
1845	January 16, 2004	Nathan Lane, Susie Essman	The Bouncing Souls
1846	January 20, 2004	Dave Chappelle, Jerry Orbach	The Candy Butchers
1847	January 21, 2004	Donald Trump, Jeff Garlin	Brian Kiley (Stand-Up)
1848	January 22, 2004	Ashton Kutcher, Kristin Kreuk	Rickie Lee Jones
1849	January 23, 2004	Topher Grace, Jack Osbourne, Jim McMullan	x
1850	February 3, 2004	Al Roker, Mischa Barton	Mindy Smith
1851	February 4, 2004	Matt Lauer, Tom Cavanagh, Paul Teutul & Mikey Teutul	x
1852	February 5, 2004	Megan Mullally, Harry Connick Jr.	Harry Connick Jr.
1853	February 6, 2004	Drew Barrymore, Paul Rudd	The Walkmen
1854	February 10, 2004	(In Toronto) Mike Myers, Ron James	x
1855	February 11, 2004	(In Toronto) Michael J. Fox, Ken Capling	Nickelback
1856	February 12, 2004	(In Toronto) Adam Sandler	Stompin' Tom Connors
1857	February 13, 2004	(In Toronto) Jim Carrey, Eric McCormack	Barenaked Ladies
1858	February 17, 2004	Meg Ryan, "Queer Eye" Guys	The Shins
1859	February 18, 2004	Kristin Davis, Omar Epps	The Holmes Brothers
1860	February 19, 2004	James Spader, Ruben Studdard, Kenny Chesney	N/A
1861	February 20, 2004	Walter Cronkite, Fred Armisen, Ben Harper	N/A
1862	February 24, 2004	Damon Wayans, Paulie Litt, Al Green	N/A
1863	February 25, 2004	Andy García, Brittany Daniel, Brini Maxwell	N/A
1864	February 26, 2004	Samuel L. Jackson, James Carville, Van Hunt	N/A
1865	February 27, 2004	Barbara Walters, Grant Rosenmeyer, Grant-Lee Phillips	N/A
1866	March 2, 2004	Andy Dick, Clyde Peeling, Wheat	N/A
1867	March 3, 2004	Snoop Dogg, Paul Bettany, Mr. Geography	N/A
1868	March 4, 2004	Michael Imperioli, Kenan Thompson, Tom Jones	N/A
1869	March 5, 2004	Ben Stiller, Owen Wilson, Meredith Vieira	N/A
1870	March 9, 2004	Liv Tyler, Juliette Lewis, Norah Jones	N/A
1871	March 10, 2004	Jeff Goldblum, Omarosa Stallworth, Sarah McLachlan	N/A
1872	March 11, 2004	Elijah Wood, Rachel Dratch, B. J. Novak	N/A
1873	March 12, 2004	Frankie Muniz, Big Show, Ollabelle	N/A
1874	March 16, 2004	Edie Falco, Mayor Jason West, The Allman Brothers Band	N/A
1875	March 17, 2004	Carson Daly, Portia de Rossi, James Lipton	N/A
1876	March 18, 2004	Kate Winslet, Jamie-Lynn DiScala, The Living End	N/A
1877	March 19, 2004	Ethan Hawke, Neil Young, Omid Djalili	N/A
1878	March 30, 2004	Bob Costas, Brian Posehn, Toby Lightman	N/A
1879	March 31, 2004	Minnie Driver, Chris Klein, Usher	N/A
1880	April 1, 2004	Al Franken, Vivica A. Fox, Scotty Nguyen	N/A
1881	April 2, 2004	The Rock, Colin Quinn, The Sleepy Jackson	N/A
1882	April 6, 2004	Johnny Knoxville, Elisha Cuthbert, The Distillers	N/A
1883	April 7, 2004	Lorraine Bracco, Bill Bellamy, Eagles of Death Metal	N/A
1884	April 8, 2004	Cedric the Entertainer, Jason Bateman, Yoshi Amao	N/A
1885	April 9, 2004	Tim Robbins, Larry King, Lambchop	N/A
1886	April 13, 2004	Uma Thurman, Jon Favreau, Sugarcult	N/A
1887	April 14, 2004	Quentin Tarantino, Rhona Mitra, Ben Kweller	N/A
1888	April 15, 2004	Chris Rock, Shannon Elizabeth, Joe Buck	N/A
1889	April 16, 2004	David Duchovny, Kwame Jackson, Jim Gaffigan	N/A
1890	April 27, 2004	Rebecca Romijn-Stamos, Patton Oswalt, Shinedown	N/A
1891	April 28, 2004	Jennifer Esposito, Mark McKinney, David Feldman	N/A
1892	April 29, 2004	Tina Fey, Jamie Foxx, John Mayer	N/A
1893	April 30, 2004	Lindsay Lohan, Randy Jackson, Patti Smith	N/A
1894	May 4, 2004	Ray Liotta, Rachel Bilson, Carly Simon	N/A
1895	May 5, 2004	Andy Richter, Mila Kunis, Georges Brossard	N/A
1896	May 6, 2004	Brad Pitt, Janet Jackson,	N/A
1897	May 7, 2004	Lauren Graham, Paula Abdul, Old Crow Medicine Show	N/A
1898	May 11, 2004	Eric Bana, Amy Poehler	Sondre Lerche
1899	May 12, 2004	Kelsey Grammer, Mariska Hargitay, Lewis Black	N/A
1900	May 13, 2004	Jimmy Fallon, Vince Curatola, Jamie Cullum	N/A
1901	May 14, 2004	Peter Gallagher, Pun Yin, Rachael Yamagata	N/A
1902	May 18, 2004	Laura Prepon, Robert Reich, Yellowcard	N/A
1903	May 19, 2004	Al Roker, Harland Williams, Manny Yarbrough	N/A
1904	May 20, 2004	Tom Selleck, Macaulay Culkin, Dave Attell	N/A
1905	May 21, 2004	Darrell Hammond, Benjamin McKenzie, Switchfoot	N/A
1906	May 25, 2004	Tom Arnold, Daniel Radcliffe, John Pizzarelli	N/A
1907	May 26, 2004	Brian Williams, Kevin Hart, Andrew W.K.	N/A
1908	May 27, 2004	Senator John McCain, George Lopez, Tom Papa	N/A
1909	May 28, 2004	Mandy Moore, Susie Essman	Ambulance LTD
1910	June 8, 2004	Jay Mohr, Richard Schiff, Simple Kid	N/A
1911	June 9, 2004	Kristin Davis, Steve Coogan, Mama Gena	N/A
1912	June 10, 2004	Jennifer Love Hewitt, Steve Irwin, Indigo Girls	N/A
1913	June 11, 2004	Ice-T, Jeremy Suarez, Demetri Martin	N/A
1914	June 15, 2004	Jackie Chan, Tim Russert, Franz Ferdinand	N/A
1915	June 16, 2004	Matthew Broderick, Steven Wright, Patti Scialfa	N/A
1916	June 17, 2004	Tom Hanks, Sam Moore With Carla Thomas	N/A
1917	June 18, 2004	Gisele Bündchen, Jesse James, Auf Der Maur	N/A
1918	June 22, 2004	Ashley Judd, Jeff Goldblum, Alanis Morissette	N/A
1919	June 23, 2004	James Garner, Busy Philipps, Air Guitar Champion	N/A
1920	June 24, 2004	Marlon Wayans, Nicole Richie, Heart	N/A
1921	June 25, 2004	Michael Moore, Patton Oswalt, Ozomatli	N/A
1922	July 6, 2004	Will Ferrell, Beth Littleford, Jesse Malin	N/A
1923	July 7, 2004	Christina Applegate, Marc Maron, Sonic Youth	N/A
1924	July 8, 2004	John McEnroe, Sting,	N/A
1925	July 9, 2004	Paul Rudd, Lars Ulrich, Jim Gaffigan	N/A
1926	July 13, 2004	Caroline Rhea, Jeff Garlin, Burning Brides	N/A
1927	July 14, 2004	Queen Latifah, Ali G, The Roots	N/A
1928	July 15, 2004	Alan Cumming, Vivica A. Fox, Ricky Fanté	N/A
1929	July 16, 2004	Rev. Al Sharpton, Randy Constan,	N/A
1930	July 20, 2004	Julianna Margulies, Kevin Pollak, Greg Fitzsimmons	N/A
1931	July 21, 2004	Benjamin Bratt, Isaac Mizrahi, Modest Mouse	N/A
1932	July 22, 2004	Halle Berry, Christopher Meloni, Erinn Smart	N/A
1933	July 23, 2004	Carson Daly, Laird Hamilton, D12	N/A
1934	August 3, 2004	Natalie Portman, Mark Consuelos, Los Lobos	N/A
1935	August 4, 2004	Jamie Foxx, Josie Maran, Beenie Man	N/A
1936	August 5, 2004	Brittany Murphy, John Cho, Louis C.K.	N/A
1937	August 6, 2004	Jada Pinkett Smith, Aries Spears, Sahara Hotnights	N/A
1938	August 10, 2004	Seth Green, Anne Hathaway	NOFX
1939	August 11, 2004	Clyde Peeling, Dax Shepard	Mutual Admiration Society
1940	August 12, 2004	Compilation show	N/A
1941	August 13, 2004	Darrell Hammond, Blanchard Ryan	They Might Be Giants
