= List of Late Night with Conan O'Brien episodes (season 6) =

This is a list of episodes for Season 6 of Late Night with Conan O'Brien, which aired from September 15, 1998, to August 20, 1999.

== Series overview ==
Season	Episodes	Originally aired	
Season	Episodes	First aired	Last aired
1	230	September 13, 1993	September 9, 1994
2	229	September 12, 1994	September 8, 1995
3	195	September 11, 1995	September 13, 1996
4	162	September 17, 1996	August 22, 1997
5	170	September 9, 1997	August 28, 1998
6	160	September 15, 1998	August 20, 1999
7	153	September 7, 1999	August 18, 2000
8	145	September 5, 2000	August 17, 2001
9	160	September 4, 2001	August 16, 2002
10	160	September 3, 2002	August 15, 2003
11	153	September 3, 2003	August 13, 2004
12	166	August 31, 2004	August 19, 2005
13	162	September 6, 2005	August 30, 2006
14	195	September 5, 2006	August 31, 2007
15	163	September 4, 2007	August 29, 2008
16	98	September 2, 2008	February 20, 2009

== Season 6 ==
No.	Original release date	Guest(s)	Musical/entertainment guest(s)
986	September 15, 1998	Rob Schneider, Maria Bello	Nick DiPaolo
987	September 16, 1998	Ben Stiller, Famke Janssen	Junior Brown
988	September 17, 1998	Caroline Rhea, Kris Kristofferson	Jud Hale
989	September 18, 1998	Jason Priestley, George Hamilton	Los Super Seven
990	September 22, 1998	Will Ferrell, Ken Olin	Bonnie Raitt
991	September 23, 1998	Martin Sheen, Alicia Witt	Local H
992	September 24, 1998	Denis Leary, Judge Judy	Jimeoin
993	September 25, 1998	Janeane Garofalo, John Waters, PJ O'Rourke	N/A
994	September 29, 1998	Fran Drescher, D. L. Hughley	N/A
995	September 30, 1998	Stanley Tucci, Nicholas Turturro	Billy Bragg & Wilco
996	October 1, 1998	Kelsey Grammer, Toni Collette, Chaz Bono	N/A
997	October 2, 1998	Gina Gershon, Dylan McDermott	Squirrel Nut Zippers
998	October 6, 1998	Yasmine Bleeth, Kevin Sorbo	Duncan Sheik
999	October 7, 1998	Charlton Heston, Peter Gallagher, Rich Hall	N/A
1000	October 8, 1998	Jeff Goldblum, Star Jones	Barenaked Ladies
1001	October 9, 1998	Jon Stewart, Louis C.K., Annabella Sciorra	N/A
1002	October 13, 1998	Stephen Baldwin, Jeri Ryan, Mark Leyner	N/A
1003	October 14, 1998	Sandra Bullock, Scott Thompson	Rasputina
1004	October 15, 1998	Lucy Lawless, Tate Donovan	Kenny Rogerson
1005	October 16, 1998	Isabella Rossellini, David Arquette	Cake
1006	October 27, 1998	Jeff Daniels, Christina Applegate	Robert Schimmel
1007	October 28, 1998	Sam Donaldson, Bob Odenkirk	Mötley Crüe
1008	October 29, 1998	Ray Romano, Reese Witherspoon, Trey Parker	Dan Naturman
1009	October 30, 1998	Martin Short, Jimmy Blaylock	Cheap Trick
1010	November 4, 1998	Kiefer Sutherland, Debbie Matenopoulos	Everlast
1011	November 5, 1998	Adam Sandler, Jonathan Taylor Thomas, Frank Pellegrino	N/A
1012	November 6, 1998	David Spade, Fred Savage	Canibus
1013	November 10, 1998	Chris Kattan, Kate Mulgrew	Gomez
1014	November 11, 1998	Luke Perry, Ice Cube	N/A
1015	November 12, 1998	Richard Dean Anderson, Tom Everett Scott, Missy Giove	N/A
1016	November 13, 1998	Roma Downey, Todd Solondz	Al Green
1017	November 17, 1998	Kevin Pollak, Alyssa Milano	R.E.M.
1018	November 18, 1998	Rob Schneider, Jerry Stiller, Drew Pinsky	N/A
1019	November 19, 1998	Jennifer Love Hewitt, Marc Maron	Kevin Brennan
1020	November 20, 1998	Charlize Theron, Jerry Springer	Everclear
1021	November 24, 1998	Dave Foley, Garth Brooks	N/A
1022	November 25, 1998	Jon Lovitz, Larry King, Stuttering John	N/A
1023	November 26, 1998	Scott Thompson, Joshua Jackson	N/A
1024	November 27, 1998	Judi Dench, Wayne Gretzky	Elvis Costello & Burt Bacharach
1025	December 8, 1998	Senator Bob Dole, Annie Potts	Guster
1026	December 9, 1998	Michael Moore, Rich Hall, Michael Jackson	N/A
1027	December 10, 1998	Tom Hanks, Roger Daltrey	N/A
1028	December 11, 1998	Alec Baldwin, Jordana Brewster	Trans-Siberian Orchestra
1029	December 15, 1998	Robin Williams, Rebecca Romijn-Stamos,	N/A
1030	December 16, 1998	Salma Hayek, Roberto Benigni	Shemekia Copeland
1031	December 17, 1998	Bill Paxton, Elijah Wood	Lewis Black
1032	December 18, 1998	Jeff Goldblum, Carol Leifer	The Flys
1033	December 22, 1998	Tom Brokaw, Caroline Rhea	Tony Bennett
1034	December 23, 1998	Barney Frank, Wanda Sykes	N/A
1035	December 29, 1998	George Wendt, Camryn Manheim	Limp Bizkit
1036	December 30, 1998	Charles Grodin	Ozomatli
1037	December 31, 1998	James Woods, Brian Kiley	Wayne Newton
1038	January 5, 1999	Chazz Palminteri, Anthony Clark	Irma Thomas
1039	January 6, 1999	Al Roker, George Brett	N/A
1040	January 7, 1999	Will Ferrell, Melina Kanakaredes	Todd Barry
1041	January 8, 1999	Lisa Kudrow, Maury Povich	Vic Chesnutt with Lambchop
1042	January 12, 1999	Michael Caine, Alan Cumming	G. E. Smith and Taylor Barton
1043	January 13, 1999	Jesse Jackson, Freddie Prinze, Jr.	Arj Barker
1044	January 14, 1999	Mira Sorvino, Greg Germann	Goo Goo Dolls
1045	January 15, 1999	James Van Der Beek, Kevin Pollak, Roshumba Williams	N/A
1046	January 19, 1999	Rudy Giuliani, Ryan Phillippe	Jewel
1047	January 20, 1999	Tony Curtis, Matthew Lillard	Patti Smith
1048	January 21, 1999	Tyra Banks, David Alan Grier	Sklar Brothers
1049	January 22, 1999	Carmen Electra, James Coburn	Fear of Pop
1050	February 2, 1999	Steven Wright, Kellie Martin	Marvelous 3
1051	February 3, 1999	Julia Sweeney, Eric McCormack	Marc Maron
1052	February 4, 1999	Gwyneth Paltrow, Tim Russert, Jason Schwartzman	N/A
1053	February 5, 1999	Pamela Anderson, Michael T. Weiss	Ricky Scaggs
1054	February 9, 1999	Stephen King, Gloria Reuben	Sixpence None the Richer
1055	February 10, 1999	John Tesh, Clyde Peeling, Jeri Ryan	N/A
1056	February 11, 1999	Rosie O'Donnell, Daniel Stern	Patton Oswalt
1057	February 12, 1999	Bill Maher, Fabio Lanzoni	Orgy
1058	February 16, 1999	Dave Chappelle, Rebecca Gayheart, James Ellroy	N/A
1059	February 17, 1999	Rosie Perez, Joshua Jackson	John Pizzarelli
1060	February 18, 1999	Andy García, Jimmy Fallon	The Afghan Whigs
1061	February 19, 1999	Andie MacDowell, Tony V., Myles Berkowitz	N/A
1062	February 23, 1999	Kevin Nealon, Ed Byrne, Michael Michele	N/A
1063	February 24, 1999	Fred Savage, Garry Marshall, Shannon Hall	N/A
1064	February 25, 1999	Martin Short, Sarah O'Hare	The Black Crowes
1065	February 26, 1999	Bill Murray, Jon Stewart	Natalie Merchant, Bruce Springsteen
1066	March 2, 1999	Al Franken, Jane Krakowski	Louis C.K.
1067	March 3, 1999	Ian McKellen, Juliette Lewis	Bare Jr.
1068	March 4, 1999	Mark Wahlberg, Wendie Malick	N/A
1069	March 5, 1999	Treat Williams, Penn & Teller	Crackpipe Wisconsin
1070	March 16, 1999	John Lithgow, Darrell Hammond	Robert Schimmel
1071	March 17, 1999	Regis Philbin, Thomas Gibson	The Chieftains
1072	March 18, 1999	Barbara Walters, Jenna Elfman, Jerry Bivona	N/A
1073	March 19, 1999	Claire Danes, Chris Eigeman	Steve Earle & the Del McCoury Band
1074	March 23, 1999	Dave Foley, Jennifer Grey	N/A
1075	March 24, 1999	Caroline Rhea, Mills Lane	N/A
1076	March 25, 1999	Steve Austin, Louie Anderson, Ben Savage	N/A
1077	March 26, 1999	Norm Macdonald, Roshumba Williams	Placebo
1078	March 30, 1999	Tom Brokaw, Colin Quinn	The Neville Brothers
1079	March 31, 1999	Thane Maynard, Dweezil & Ahmet Zappa	Greg Behrendt
1080	April 1, 1999	Jackie Chan, Diane Lane	Al Kooper
1081	April 2, 1999	Kevin Pollak, Josh Charles	Collective Soul
1082	April 6, 1999	Lyle Lovett, David Brenner, Amy Sedaris	N/A
1083	April 7, 1999	David Arquette, Jerry O'Connell	Susan Tedeschi
1084	April 8, 1999	Will Ferrell, Jennifer Esposito, Mike Lupica	N/A
1085	April 9, 1999	Jay Mohr, Jerry Springer	Citizen King
1086	April 13, 1999	Martha Stewart, David Blaine	Todd Barry
1087	April 14, 1999	Liv Tyler, Tim Meadows	Juvenile
1088	April 15, 1999	Evander Holyfield, Marc Maron	Latin Playboys
1089	April 16, 1999	Chris O'Donnell, Megan Mullally	David Feldman
1090	April 27, 1999	Matt Lauer, Seth Green	Sugar Ray
1091	April 28, 1999	Ana Gasteyer, George Stephanopoulos, Paula Cale	N/A
1092	April 29, 1999	Michael J. Fox, Kevin James	Bill Burr
1093	April 30, 1999	Matthew Broderick, Michael Moore	Godsmack
1094	May 4, 1999	Al Roker, Louis C.K.	Madness
1095	May 5, 1999	Aidan Quinn, Christa Miller	N/A
1096	May 6, 1999	Julianne Moore, Reese Witherspoon, Scott Dikkers	N/A
1097	May 7, 1999	Michael Rapaport	N/A
1098	May 11, 1999	Paul Reiser, Chris Kattan	Old 97's
1099	May 12, 1999	Janeane Garofalo & Ben Stiller, George Segal	N/A
1100	May 13, 1999	Sarah Michelle Gellar, Camryn Manheim	Maria Bamford
1101	May 14, 1999	Rob Lowe, Michelle Williams	Hootie & the Blowfish
1102	May 18, 1999	Shannen Doherty, Timothy Dalton	N/A
1103	May 19, 1999	Scott Thompson, Sable	N/A
1104	May 20, 1999	Tom Selleck, William Shatner	Lewis Black
1105	May 21, 1999	Helen Hunt, Keri Russell	Built to Spill
1106	May 25, 1999	Gina Gershon, Craig Bierko	Greg Fitzsimmons
1107	May 26, 1999	Steven Wright, Kari Wührer	Lit
1108	May 27, 1999	Susan Lucci, Bill Bellamy	N/A
1109	May 28, 1999	Damon Wayans, Gabrielle Reece	Kurt Andersen
1110	June 8, 1999	Sarah Jessica Parker, George Thorogood	N/A
1111	June 9, 1999	Geraldo Rivera, Rachel Griffiths	Upright Citizens Brigade
1112	June 10, 1999	Scott Wolf, Alison Eastwood	Michael Moschen
1113	June 11, 1999	Dave Foley, Joy Behar	Fountains of Wayne
1114	June 15, 1999	Brian Dennehy, James McDaniel	Brian Regan
1115	June 16, 1999	Noah Wyle, Jonathan Katz	Mike Ness
1116	June 17, 1999	Nathan Lane, Wayne Knight, Joe Distler	N/A
1117	June 18, 1999	Mike Myers	N/A
1118	June 22, 1999	Patricia Arquette, Allen Covert	Seal
1119	June 23, 1999	Bob Costas, Frederique	Robert Cray
1120	June 24, 1999	Adam Sandler, Vince McMahon	N/A
1121	June 25, 1999	Richard Belzer,	N/A
1122	July 6, 1999	John Leguizamo, Tom Green	Margaret Smith
1123	July 7, 1999	Dan Rather, Trey Parker and Matt Stone	Tom Petty & The Heartbreakers
1124	July 8, 1999	Al Roker, Alyson Hannigan	Marc Maron
1125	July 9, 1999	Chris Rock, Jennifer Esposito	Cubanismo
1126	July 13, 1999	Jim Breuer, Harry Hamlin	Ronnie Dawson
1127	July 14, 1999	Carmen Electra, Eugene Levy	Kelly Willis
1128	July 15, 1999	Rudy Giuliani, Dwayne Perkins	Jeff Greenfield
1129	July 16, 1999	Rupert Everett, Jerry Orbach	Gillian Welch & David Rawlings with Emmylou Harris
1130	July 20, 1999	Kevin Nealon, Adrien Brody, Joey Ramone	N/A
1131	July 21, 1999	Tori Spelling, Tony Randall	Moby
1132	July 22, 1999	Jon Lovitz, Amy Adams	Ed Byrne
1133	July 23, 1999	Janeane Garofalo, Chris Elliott	Public Enemy
1134	August 3, 1999	Jeffrey Tambor, Harry Connick, Jr.	N/A
1135	August 4, 1999	Pierce Brosnan, Al Goldstein	Jake Johannsen
1136	August 5, 1999	Ana Gasteyer, Malcolm McDowell	Wanda Sykes
1137	August 6, 1999	Matthew Broderick, Kristen Davis	Train
1138	August 10, 1999	Scott Thompson, Ruby Wax	Jeff Beck
1139	August 11, 1999	Darrell Hammond, Michael C. Williams	Gene Pompa
1140	August 12, 1999	Claire Danes, Richard Kind	Todd Barry
1141	August 13, 1999	Jarod Miller, Joely Fisher	Buckcherry
1142	August 17, 1999	LL Cool J, Jamie Kennedy	Los Lobos
1143	August 18, 1999	Jason Priestley, Roshumba	N/A
1144	August 19, 1999	Hugh Grant, Esther Cañadas	Louis C.K.
1145	August 20, 1999	Steve Austin, Michael Boltman	Diana Krall
