= List of Late Night with Conan O'Brien episodes (season 16) =

This is a list of episodes for Season 16 of Late Night with Conan O'Brien, which aired from September 2, 2008, to February 20, 2009.

== Series overview ==
Season	Episodes	Originally aired	
Season	Episodes	First aired	Last aired
1	230	September 13, 1993	September 9, 1994
2	229	September 12, 1994	September 8, 1995
3	195	September 11, 1995	September 13, 1996
4	162	September 17, 1996	August 22, 1997
5	170	September 9, 1997	August 28, 1998
6	160	September 15, 1998	August 20, 1999
7	153	September 7, 1999	August 18, 2000
8	145	September 5, 2000	August 17, 2001
9	160	September 4, 2001	August 16, 2002
10	160	September 3, 2002	August 15, 2003
11	153	September 3, 2003	August 13, 2004
12	166	August 31, 2004	August 19, 2005
13	162	September 6, 2005	August 30, 2006
14	195	September 5, 2006	August 31, 2007
15	163	September 4, 2007	August 29, 2008
16	98	September 2, 2008	February 20, 2009

== Season 16 ==
No.	Original air date	Guest(s)	Musical/entertainment guest(s)
2628	September 2, 2008	Jarod Miller, Jason Lezak	Ra Ra Riot
2629	September 3, 2008	Nicolas Cage, Vivica A. Fox	Delta Spirit
2630	September 4, 2008	Dr Phil Mcgraw, Kevin Connolly	Adele
2631	September 5, 2008	Jerry O'Connell, Tim Gunn	Christian Lander
2632	September 8, 2008	Howie Mandel, Nastia Liukin	Bon Iver
2633	September 9, 2008	Keira Knightley, Tyler Perry	Bill Burr
2634	September 10, 2008	Curtis '50 Cent' Jackson, Kaitlin Olson	Gym Class Heroes
2635	September 11, 2008	Serena Williams, Amy Sedaris	Meiko
2636	September 12, 2008	Eva Mendes, Luke Russert	The Fab Faux
2637	September 15, 2008	Samuel L. Jackson, Ricky Gervais	Marc Broussard
2638	September 16, 2008	Martha Stewart, Harland Williams	Kasey Chambers & Shane...
2639	September 17, 2008	Ray Liotta, Marc Maron	Loudon Wainwright III
2640	September 18, 2008	Anderson Cooper, Willie Nelson	Southside Johnny with La...
2641	September 19, 2008	Ice-T, Dwyane Wade	Shane Mauss
2642	September 22, 2008	Diane Lane, Patton Oswalt	Little Feat
2643	September 23, 2008	Billy Bob Thornton, Aasif Mandvi	Kenny Shopsin
2644	September 24, 2008	Jaime Pressly, Little Britain	Lenka
2645	September 25, 2008	Julianne Moore, Zachary Levi	Jakob Dylan with Norah...
2646	September 26, 2008	Brooke Shields, Robert Reich	Amos Lee
2647	September 29, 2008	Bill Maher, Simon Pegg	The Watson Twins
2648	September 30, 2008	Julia Louis-Dreyfus, Michael Cera	Nate Bargatze
2649	October 1, 2008	Robin Wright Penn, Louis C.K.	Department of Eagles
2650	October 2, 2008	Tom Arnold, Flavor Flav	Ben Folds
2651	October 3, 2008	Greg Kinnear, J.J. Abrams	Nick Cave - the Bad Seeds
2652	October 6, 2008	Felicity Huffman, Jason Sudeikis	Jenny Lewis
2653	October 7, 2008	Russell Crowe, Alicia Keys	Death Cab for Cutie
2654	October 8, 2008	Molly Shannon, Jason Ritter	Noah McCullough
2655	October 9, 2008	Dennis Quaid, Lance Mackey	Sarah McLachlan
2656	October 10, 2008	LL Cool J, Oliver Stone	Dead Confederate
2657	October 13, 2008	Christian Slater, Brian Posehn	Flobots
2658	October 14, 2008	Harry Connick Jr., Richard Lewis	O.A.R.
2659	October 15, 2008	Bill Murray, Rob Corddry	Ray LaMontagne
2660	October 16, 2008	Josh Brolin, Shaun Ellis - Helen Jeffs	Nikka Costa
2661	October 17, 2008	Mike Birbiglia, Edward Norton	Chris 'ludacris' Bridges
2662	October 27, 2008	Charles Barkley, Justin Long	Annuals
2663	October 28, 2008	Tina Fey, Peter Sarsgaard	The Black Crowes
2664	October 29, 2008	Tracy Morgan, Paget Brewster	The Last Shadow Puppets
2665	October 30, 2008	Jada Pinkett-Smith, Rachel Maddow	Pink
2666	October 31, 2008	Mary-Kate Olsen, Will Forte	Tom Nardone
2667	November 3, 2008	Brian Williams, Bill Bellamy	The Decemberists
2668	November 5, 2008	Dennis Hopper, Katt Williams	Phil Lesh & Friends
2669	November 6, 2008	Elvis Costello, Madeleine Albright	Lordi
2670	November 7, 2008	Ricky Gervais, Vera Farmiga	Chromeo
2671	November 10, 2008	Andy Richter, Jim Cramer	Tom Papa
2672	November 11, 2008	Seth Green, Artie Lange	Conor O'Berst
2673	November 12, 2008	Tom Brokaw, Frank Caliendo	Joshua Radin
2674	November 13, 2008	Paul Rudd, John Stamos	Boz Scaggs
2675	November 14, 2008	Masi Oka, Alan Zweibel	Rock of Ages
2676	November 17, 2008	Snoop Dogg, Brian Regan	Blitzen Trapper
2677	November 18, 2008	Jeff Corwin, Debra Messing	John Hodgman
2678	November 19, 2008	Martin Short, Sarah Vowell	Margot & the Nuclear So and...
2679	November 20, 2008	Rosie O'Donnell, Becki Newton	Brian Wilson
2680	November 21, 2008	Kiefer Sutherland, Rachel Maddow	Vampire Weekend
2681	November 24, 2008	Hugh Jackman, Marge Klindera	Tom Morello & The...
2682	November 25, 2008	Kanye West, Seth McFarlane	
2683	November 26, 2008	Ethan Hawke, Nikki Reed	Plain White T's
2684	December 8, 2008	Stephen Colbert, Keri Russell	The Lee Boys
2685	December 9, 2008	Hugh Laurie, Joel McHale	The Gaslight Anthem
2686	December 10, 2008	Jennifer Connelly, Bradley Cooper	Alec Greven
2687	December 11, 2008	Bill Hader, Jessica Szohr	Tony Bennett
2688	December 12, 2008	Don Rickles, John Leguizamo	Erran Baron Cohen
2689	December 15, 2008	Amy Adams, Eddie Izzard	John Legend
2690	December 16, 2008	Eva Mendes, Ken Mink	Fleet Foxes
2691	December 17, 2008	Jeff Goldblum, David Gregory	Charlie Viracola
2692	December 18, 2008	Matthew Broderick, Paul F. Tompkins	Little Big Town
2693	December 19, 2008	Jennifer Aniston, Judah Friedlander	Pilobolus
2694	December 22, 2008	Carson Daly, Steve Schirripa	Bela Fleck & The Flecktones
2695	December 23, 2008	Dustin Hoffman, Greg Giraldo	Old Crow Medicine Show
2696	January 5, 2009	Benicio Del Toro, Sarah Chalke	Doyle & Debbie
2697	January 6, 2009	Kate Hudson, Tim Daly	Bang Camaro
2698	January 7, 2009	Chris Meloni, Sheriff Joe Arpaio	The Derek Trucks Band
2699	January 8, 2009	Howie Mandel, Anthony Mackie	Lady Antebellum
2700	January 12, 2009	Daniel Radcliffe, Dr. Drew Pinsky	Eric Hutchinson
2701	January 13, 2009	Rosario Dawson, Donald Faison	Susan Tedeschi
2702	January 14, 2009	Salma Hayek, Paul Bettany	Patty Loveless
2703	January 15, 2009	Bob Costas, Fred Armisen	Robert Schimmel
2704	January 19, 2009	Teri Hatcher, Aries Spears	Q-Tip
2705	January 20, 2009	William H. Macy, Steve Nash	Los Straitjackets
2706	January 21, 2009	Meredith Vieira, Marc Maron	Fall Out Boy
2707	January 22, 2009	Ron Howard, Eric McCormack	John Cassidy
2708	January 26, 2009	John C. Reilly, Jimmie Johnson	The Walkmen
2709	January 27, 2009	Matt Lauer, Steve Harvey	M83
2710	January 28, 2009	Evangeline Lilly, Kevin Connolly	Cold War Kids
2711	January 29, 2009	Jon Stewart, Mary Lynn Rajskub	Mike Birbiglia
2712	February 2, 2009	Kathy Griffin, Paula Deen	Amy LaVere
2713	February 3, 2009	Seth Meyers, Johnny Knoxville	Zac Brown Band
2714	February 4, 2009	Jon Hamm, Ginnifer Goodwin	Theresa Andersson
2715	February 5, 2009	Brian Williams, Taraji P. Henson	Nate Bargatze
2716	February 9, 2009	Clive Owen, Judah Friedlander	Brett Dennen, Matisyahu
2717	February 10, 2009	Norm Macdonald, Gordon Ramsay	Levon Helm
2718	February 11, 2009	Jimmy Fallon, Rose Byrne	John Pizzarelli
2719	February 12, 2009	Alec Baldwin, Eliza Dushku	They Might Be Giants
2720	February 13, 2009	Isla Fisher, Jonas Brothers	Dan Auerbach
2721	February 16, 2009	Bob Saget	The Newno2
2722	February 17, 2009	Jason Sudeikis	
2723	February 18, 2009	Nathan Lane	
2724	February 19, 2009	Jerry Seinfeld	Craig Bierko
2725	February 20, 2009	Andy Richter	The White Stripes
