= Jake Johannsen =

American comedian (born 1960)

- Born: July 28, 1960 (age 66); Iowa City, Iowa, U.S.
- Spouse: Belinda Waymouth
- Children: 1

Jake Johannsen (born July 28, 1960) is an American comedian, writer, and actor.

== Early life ==
Johannsen attended Iowa State University in the early 1980s, originally majoring in veterinary medicine, and then later changing to chemical engineering. He left after three years in college and relocated to San Francisco, California, in order to pursue a career in comedy. Johannsen made his debut at Cobb's Comedy Club in San Francisco, and by 1986 had won the 11th Annual San Francisco International Comedy Competition.

== Career ==
During the 1990s, Johannsen starred in his own HBO comedy special, This'll Take About an Hour, which was listed as one of the Ten Best Television Shows by People Magazine in 1992. In 1994, he was nominated as "Best Male Stand-Up Comedian" for the 1994 American Comedy Awards.

According to Jerry Seinfeld, Johannsen was originally wanted for the role of George Costanza in Seinfeld, but he refused the part.

In 2010, Johannsen starred in his second Comedy Special titled I Love You, which aired on Showtime and was directed and produced by The Aristocrats editor Emery Emery.

Johannsen also was the star headliner of the inaugural Iowa Comedy Festival. Johannsen performed October 16, 2010, at People's Court in downtown Des Moines to cap off the four-day event.

Johannsen is a favorite of David Letterman and made the all time record of 46 appearances as the featured Friday night comic on the Late Show with David Letterman.

== Filmography ==
=== Film ===
Year	Title	Role	Notes
1993	Loaded Weapon 1	Drug Dealer	
1994	Mrs. Parker and the Vicious Circle	John Peter Toohey	
1999	Breakfast of Champions	Bill Bailey	
1999	Suckers	Lance	
2015	American Dirtbags	Alaina's Dad	
2016	Stars in Shorts: No Ordinary Love	Richard	

=== Television ===
Year	Title	Role	Notes
1994	Two Drink Minimum	Host	2 seasons
1996	Weird Science	Kahuna	Episode: "Free Gary"
1996	Back to Back	Officer Jones	Television film
1996	The Larry Sanders Show	Jake Johannsen	Episode: "Where Is the Love?"
1996	Fairway to Heaven	Host	Television film
1997	Married... with Children	Dr. H. Longo	Episode: "Breaking Up Is Easy to Do: Part 1"
1997, 1999	Dr. Katz, Professional Therapist	Jake	2 episodes
2001	Late Friday	Host	Television film
2001	It's Like, You Know...	Wayne	Episode: "Lust for Life"

== Personal life ==
He and his wife, actress Belinda Waymouth, have one child.
