= Animal Exploration with Jarod Miller =

- Written by: Frank C.S. Jannuzzi (2007–2009); Charles Van Steenburgh (2010)
- Directed by: J.C. Calciano (2007–2009); Peter Ettinger (2010); Bryan Curb (2010)
- Starring: Jarod Miller
- Country of origin: United States
- Original language: English
- No. of seasons: 3
- No. of episodes: 46

Production
- Executive producer: Dave Morgan (2007–2010)
- Running time: 19 minutes
- Production company: Litton Entertainment

Original release
- Network: Syndication
- Release: September 24, 2007 – June 9, 2010

Animal Exploration with Jarod Miller is an American documentary television series hosted by Jarod Miller, and was broadcast from September 24, 2007, to June 9, 2010.

Reruns of the show aired on Qubo from July 3, 2010 to December 28, 2014.

== Plot ==
Each episode follows Miller with a close-up of featured animals in local zoos, and aquariums across the United States and interviews with the staff members of the zoo or aquarium.
