= David Letterman =

American comedian and TV host (born 1947)

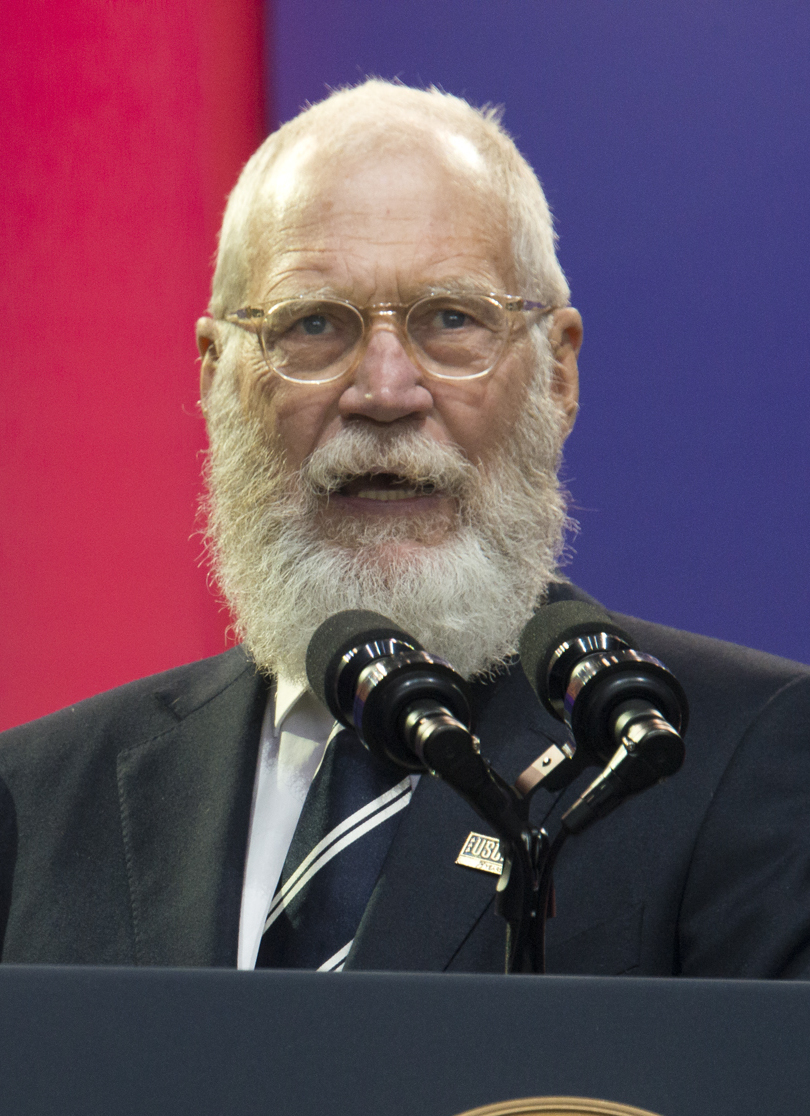
- Letterman in 2016
- Born: David Michael Letterman; April 12, 1947 (age 79); Indianapolis, Indiana, U.S.
- Education: Ball State University (BA)
- Notable work: The David Letterman Show (1980); Late Night with David Letterman (1982–1993); Late Show with David Letterman (1993–2015); My Next Guest Needs No Introduction with David Letterman (2018–present)
- Spouses: Michelle Cook (m. 1968; div. 1977); Regina Lasko (m. 2009)
- Children: 1

Comedy career
- Years active: 1970–present
- Medium: Stand-up; television; film
- Genres: Observational comedy; black comedy; surreal humor; insult comedy; deadpan; satire
- Subjects: American culture; American politics; everyday life; pop culture; current events; human behavior

David Michael Letterman (born April 12, 1947) is an American comedian, television host, writer, and producer. He hosted late-night television talk shows for 33 years, beginning with the February 1, 1982, debut of Late Night with David Letterman on NBC and ending with the May 20, 2015, broadcast of Late Show with David Letterman on CBS. In total, Letterman hosted 6,080 episodes of Late Night and Late Show, surpassing his friend and mentor Johnny Carson as the longest-serving late-night talk show host in American television history.

Letterman is also a television and film producer. His company, Worldwide Pants, produced his shows as well as The Late Late Show and several primetime comedies, the most successful of which was the CBS sitcom Everybody Loves Raymond. Several late-night hosts have cited Letterman's influence, including Conan O'Brien, Jimmy Fallon, Seth Meyers (each of whom succeeded Letterman on Late Night), Stephen Colbert (his successor on The Late Show), Jimmy Kimmel, and Jon Stewart. Since 2018, he has hosted the Netflix series My Next Guest Needs No Introduction with David Letterman.

== Early life and career ==
Letterman was born in Indianapolis, Indiana, on April 12, 1947. He has two sisters, one older and one younger. His father, Harry Joseph Letterman (April 15, 1915 – February 13, 1973), was a florist. His mother, Dorothy Marie Letterman Mengering (née Hofert; July 18, 1921 – April 11, 2017), a church secretary for the Second Presbyterian Church of Indianapolis, was an occasional figure on Letterman's show, usually at holidays and birthdays.

Letterman grew up on the north side of Indianapolis, in the Broad Ripple area, about 12 miles (19 km) from the Indianapolis Motor Speedway. He enjoyed collecting model cars, including racers. In 2000, he told an interviewer for Esquire that, while growing up, he admired his father's ability to tell jokes and be the life of the party. Harry Joseph Letterman survived a heart attack at the age of 36 when David was a young boy. The fear of losing his father was constantly with Letterman as he grew up. The elder Letterman died of a second heart attack in 1973 at the age of 57.

Letterman attended his hometown's Broad Ripple High School and worked as a stock boy at the local Atlas Supermarket. In an interview, he said the first concert he attended was by the Beach Boys at the Indiana State Fairgrounds Coliseum, when he was 17. According to the Ball State Daily News, he originally wanted to attend Indiana University, but his grades were not good enough, so he instead attended Ball State University in Muncie, Indiana. He is a member of the Sigma Chi fraternity, and graduated in 1969 from what was then the Department of Radio and Television. A self-described average student, Letterman later endowed a scholarship for what he called "C students" at Ball State. Though he registered for the draft and passed his physical after graduating from college, he was not drafted for service in Vietnam because he received a draft lottery number of 346 (out of 366).

Letterman began his broadcasting career as an announcer and newscaster at the college's student-run radio station—WBST—a 10-watt campus station that is now part of Indiana Public Radio. He was fired for treating classical music with irreverence. He then became involved with the founding of another campus station—WAGO-AM 570 (now WCRD, 91.3).

He credits Paul Dixon, host of the Paul Dixon Show, a Cincinnati-based talk show also shown in Indianapolis while he was growing up, for inspiring his choice of career:

I was just out of college [in 1969], and I really didn't know what I wanted to do. And then all of a sudden I saw him doing it [on TV]. And I thought: That's really what I want to do!

=== Weatherman ===
Soon after graduating from Ball State in 1969, Letterman began his career as a radio talk show host on WNTS and on Indianapolis television station WLWI (which changed its call sign to WTHR in 1976) as an anchor and weatherman. He received some attention for his novel on-air delivery, which included congratulating a tropical storm for being upgraded to a hurricane, as well as for predicting hailstones "the size of canned hams".

Letterman also occasionally reported the weather and the day's very high and low temps for fictitious cities ("Eight inches of snow in Bingree and surrounding areas"). On another occasion, he riffed that the state border between Indiana and Ohio had been erased, when a satellite map accidentally omitted it, jokingly attributing it to dirty political dealings: "The higher-ups have removed the border between Indiana and Ohio, making it one giant state. Personally, I'm against it. I don't know what to do about it."

Letterman also starred in a local kiddie show, hosted a late-night TV show called "Freeze-Dried Movies" (a show in which he once acted out a scene from Godzilla (1954) using plastic dinosaurs), and hosted a talk show that aired early on Saturday mornings called Clover Power, in which he interviewed 4-H members about their projects.

In 1971, Letterman appeared as a pit road reporter for ABC Sports' tape-delayed coverage of the Indianapolis 500, which was his first nationally telecast appearance (WLWI was the local ABC affiliate at the time). He was initially introduced as Chris Economaki, but this was corrected at the end of the interview (Jim McKay announced his name as Dave Letterman). Letterman interviewed Mario Andretti, who had just crashed out of the race.

=== Move to Los Angeles ===
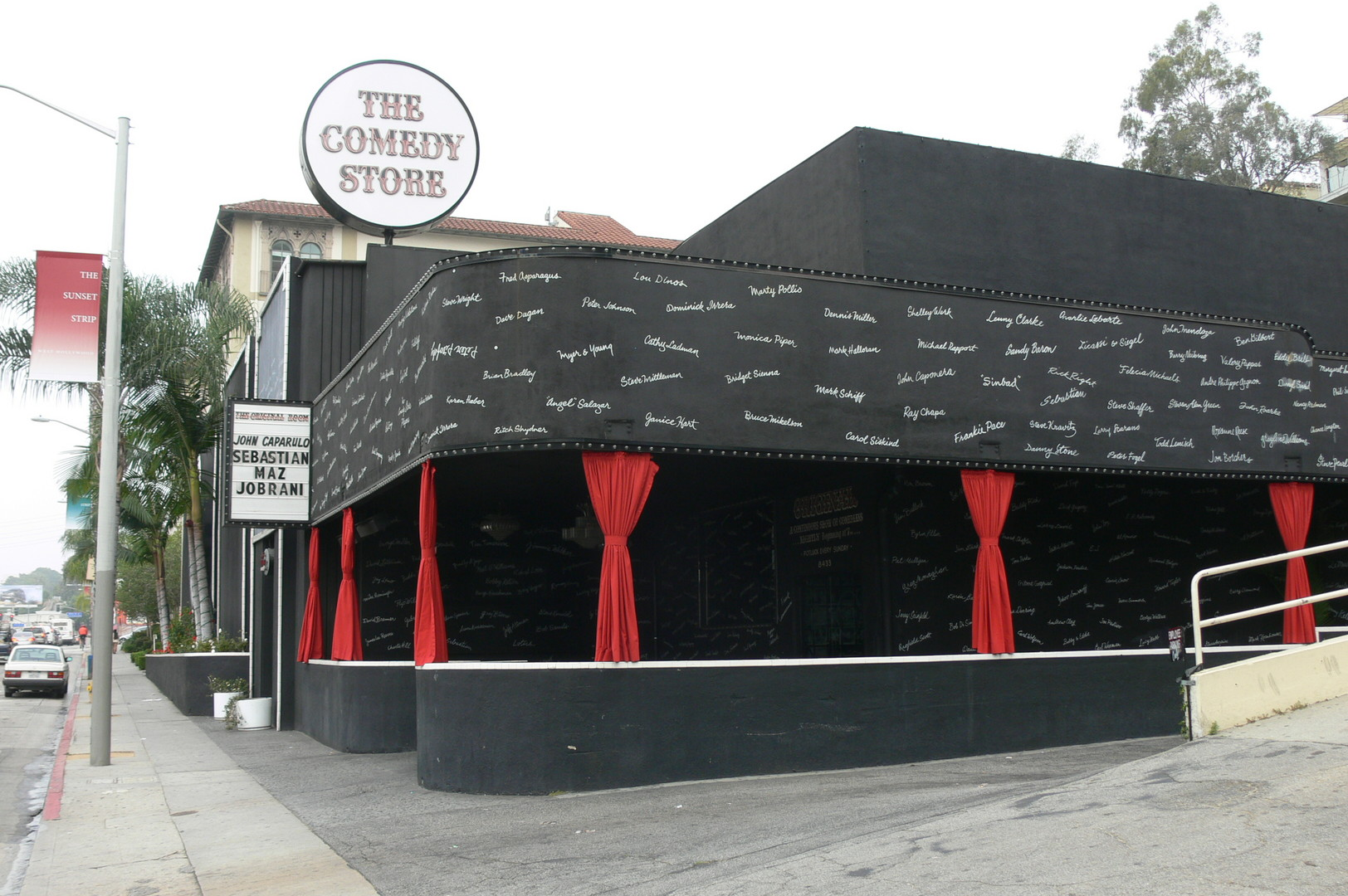
Letterman's comedic career took hold in the 1970s at The Comedy Store in Los Angeles.

In 1975, encouraged by his then-wife Michelle and several of his Sigma Chi fraternity brothers, Letterman moved to Los Angeles, California, with the hope of becoming a comedy writer. He and Michelle packed their belongings in his pickup truck and headed west. As of 2012, he still owned the truck. In Los Angeles, he began performing comedy at The Comedy Store. Jimmie Walker saw him on stage; with an endorsement from George Miller, Letterman joined a group of comedians whom Walker hired to write jokes for his stand-up act, a group that at various times also included Jay Leno, Paul Mooney, Robert Schimmel, Richard Jeni, Louie Anderson, Elayne Boosler, Byron Allen, Jack Handey, and Steve Oedekerk.

By the summer of 1977, Letterman was a writer and regular on the six-week summer series The Starland Vocal Band Show, broadcast on CBS. He hosted a 1977 pilot for a game show called The Riddlers (which was never picked up), and co-starred in the Barry Levinson-produced comedy special Peeping Times, which aired in January 1978. Later that year, Letterman was a cast member on Mary Tyler Moore's variety show, Mary. He made a guest appearance on Mork & Mindy (as a parody of EST leader Werner Erhard) and appearances on game shows such as The $20,000 Pyramid, The Gong Show, Hollywood Squares, Password Plus, and Liar's Club, as well as the Canadian cooking show Celebrity Cooks (November 1977), talk shows such as 90 Minutes Live (February 24 and April 14, 1978), and The Mike Douglas Show (April 3, 1979, and February 7, 1980). He was also screen tested for the lead role in the 1980 film Airplane!, a role that eventually went to Robert Hays.

Letterman's brand of dry, sarcastic humor caught the attention of scouts for The Tonight Show Starring Johnny Carson, and he was soon a regular guest on the show. He became a favorite of Carson and was a regular guest host for the show in 1980–1981. Letterman credits Carson as the person who influenced his career the most.

== NBC ==
=== Morning show ===
On June 23, 1980, Letterman was given his own morning comedy show on NBC, The David Letterman Show. It was originally 90 minutes long but was shortened to 60 minutes in August 1980. The show was a critical success, winning two Emmy Awards, but was a ratings disappointment and was canceled, the last show airing October 24, 1980.

=== Late Night with David Letterman ===
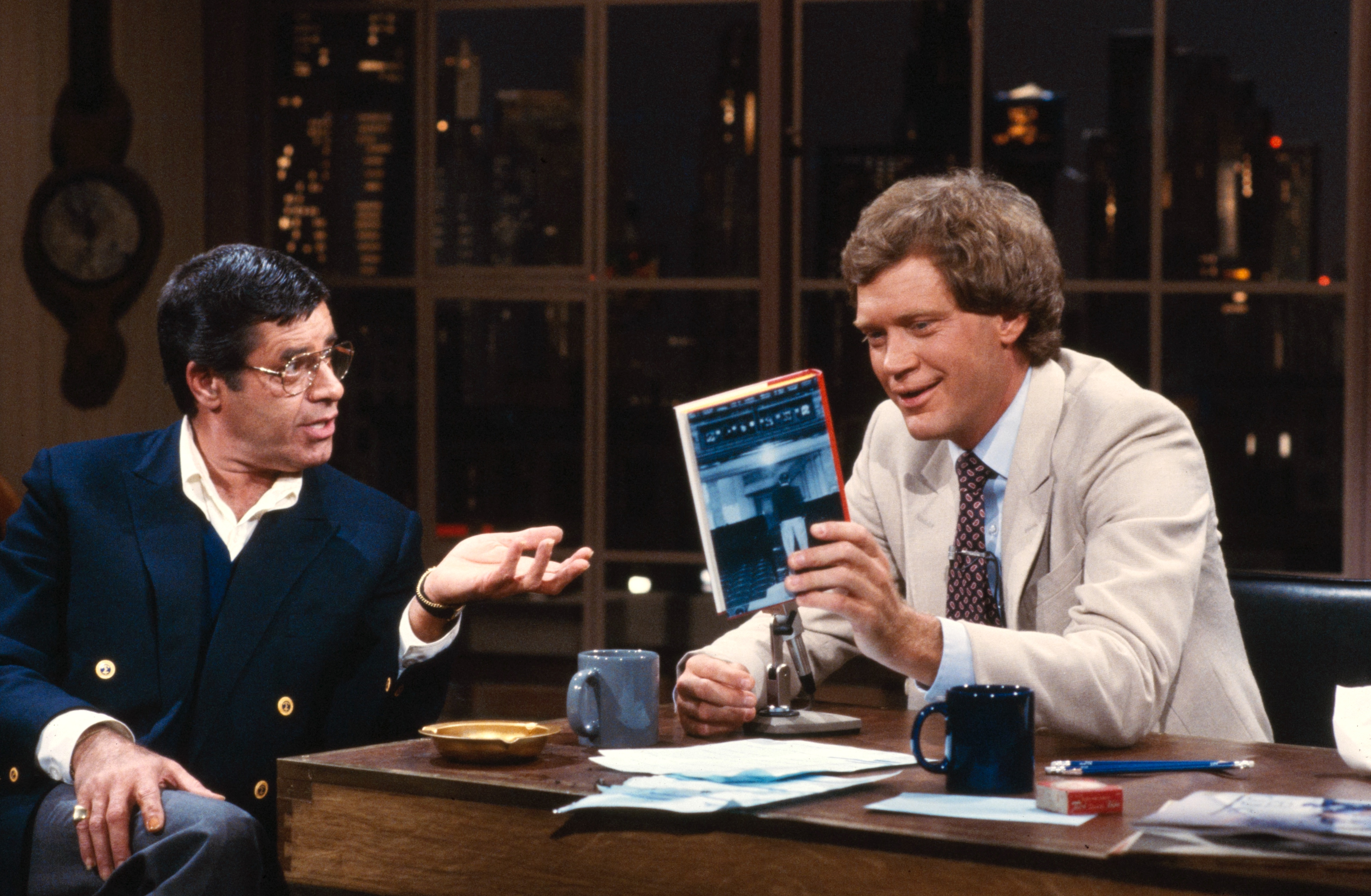
Letterman interviewing comedian Jerry Lewis in 1982

NBC kept Letterman on its payroll to try him in a different time slot. Late Night with David Letterman debuted February 1, 1982; the first guest was Bill Murray. Murray went on to become one of Letterman's most frequent guests, guesting on his later CBS show's celebration of his 30th anniversary in late-night television, which aired January 31, 2012, and on the final CBS show, which aired May 20, 2015. The show ran Monday through Thursday nights at 12:30 a.m. Eastern Time, immediately following The Tonight Show Starring Johnny Carson (a Friday night broadcast was added in June 1987). It was seen as edgy and unpredictable, and soon developed a cult following (particularly among college students). Letterman's reputation as an acerbic interviewer was borne out in verbal sparring matches with Cher (who even called him an "asshole" on the show), Shirley MacLaine, Charles Grodin, and Madonna. The show also featured comedy segments and running characters, in a style heavily influenced by the 1950s and 1960s programs of Steve Allen.

The show often featured quirky, genre-mocking regular features, including "Stupid Pet Tricks" (which had its origins on Letterman's morning show), Stupid Human Tricks, dropping various objects off the roof of a five-story building, demonstrations of unorthodox clothing (such as suits made of Alka-Seltzer, Velcro and suet), a recurring Top 10 list, the Monkey-Cam and the Audience Cam, a facetious letter-answering segment, several "Film[s] by My Dog Bob" in which a camera was mounted on Letterman's own dog, and Small Town News, all of which moved with Letterman to CBS.

Other episodes included Letterman using a bullhorn to interrupt a live interview on The Today Show on August 19, 1985, announcing that he was the NBC News president Lawrence K. Grossman and that he was not wearing any pants; walking across the hall to Studio 6B, at the time the news studio for WNBC-TV, and interrupting Al Roker's weather segments during Live at Five; and staging "elevator races", complete with commentary by NBC Sports' Bob Costas. In one appearance, in 1982, Andy Kaufman (who was wearing a neck brace) appeared with professional wrestler Jerry Lawler, who slapped and knocked the comedian to the ground (Lawler and Kaufman's friend Bob Zmuda later revealed that the incident was staged).

== CBS ==
=== Late Show with David Letterman ===
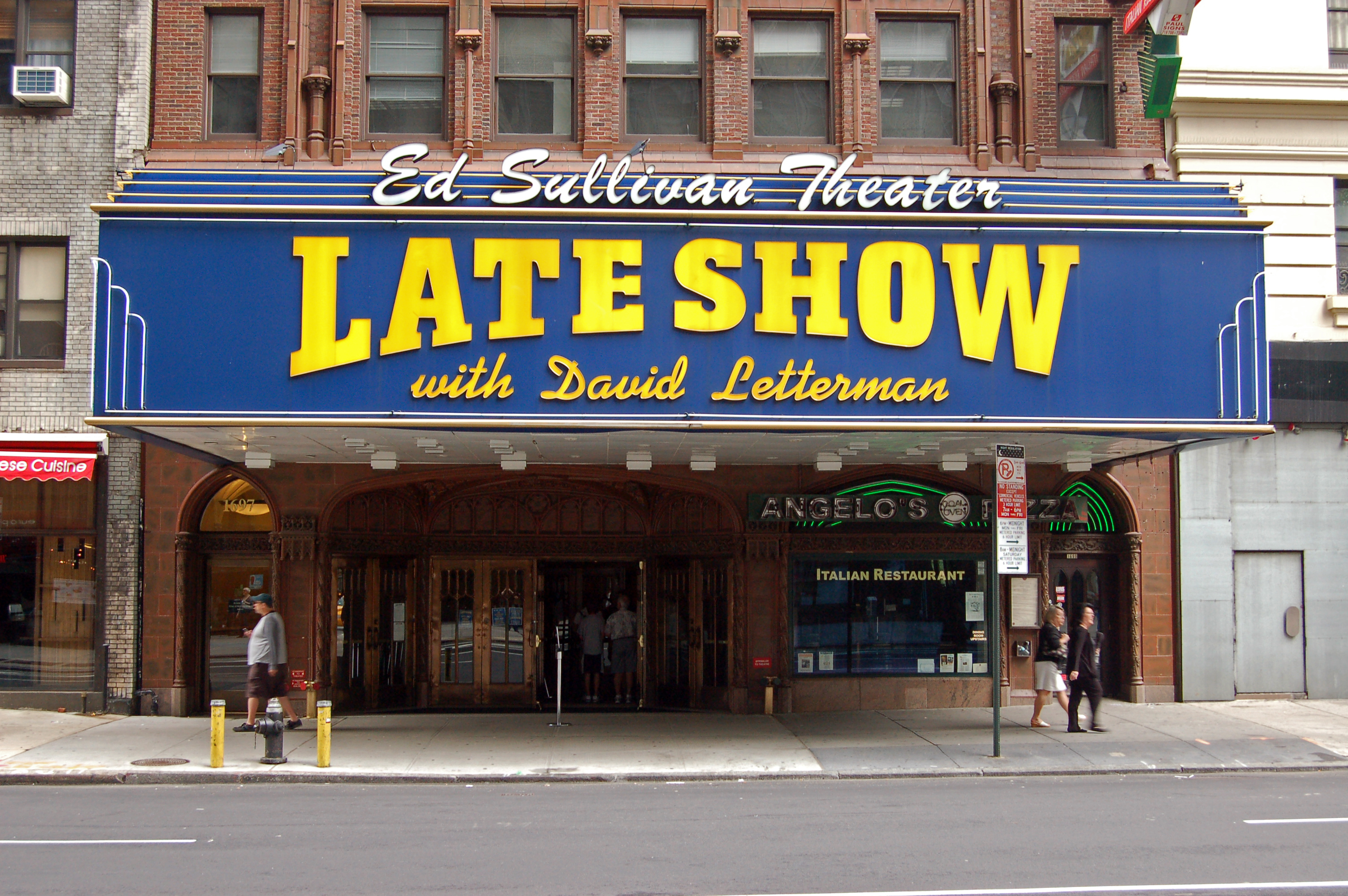
The Ed Sullivan Theater, where Late Show with David Letterman was recorded

In 1992, Johnny Carson retired, and many fans, and Carson himself, believed that Letterman would become the new host of The Tonight Show. When NBC instead gave the job to Jay Leno, Letterman departed NBC to host his own late-night show on CBS, opposite The Tonight Show at 11:30 p.m., called Late Show with David Letterman. The new show debuted on August 30, 1993, and was taped at the historic Ed Sullivan Theater, where Ed Sullivan broadcast his eponymous variety series from 1948 to 1971. For Letterman's arrival, CBS spent $8 million in renovations. CBS also signed Letterman to a three-year, $14 million/year contract, doubling his Late Night salary.

But while the expectation was that Letterman would retain his unique style and sense of humor with the move, Late Show was not an exact replica of his old NBC program. The monologue was lengthened. Paul Shaffer and the World's Most Dangerous Band followed Letterman to CBS, but they added a brass section and were rebranded the CBS Orchestra (at Shaffer's request); a small band had been mandated by Carson while Letterman occupied the 12:30 slot. Additionally, because of intellectual property disagreements, Letterman was unable to import many of his Late Night segments verbatim, but he sidestepped this problem by simply renaming them (the "Top Ten List" became the "Late Show Top Ten", "Viewer Mail" became the "CBS Mailbag", etc.). Time magazine wrote, "Letterman's innovation ... gained power from its rigorous formalism"; as his biographer Jason Zinoman puts it, he was "a fascinatingly disgruntled eccentric trapped inside a more traditional talk show".

=== Popularity ===
The Late Show's main competitor was NBC's The Tonight Show, which Jay Leno hosted for 22 years from 1992 to 2014, except from June 1, 2009, to January 22, 2010, when Conan O'Brien hosted. In 1993 and 1994, the Late Show consistently gained higher ratings than The Tonight Show. But in 1995, ratings dipped and Leno's show consistently beat Letterman's in the ratings from the time that Hugh Grant came on Leno's show after being arrested for soliciting a prostitute.

Leno typically attracted about five million nightly viewers between 1999 and 2009. The Late Show lost nearly half its audience during its competition with Leno, attracting 7.1 million viewers nightly in its 1993–94 season and about 3.8 million per night as of Leno's departure in 2009. In the final months of his first stint as host of The Tonight Show, Leno beat Letterman in the ratings by a 1.3 million-viewer margin (5.2 million to 3.9 million), and Nightline and the Late Show were virtually tied. Once O'Brien took over Tonight, Letterman closed the gap in the ratings. O'Brien initially drove the median age of Tonight Show viewers from 55 to 45, with most older viewers opting to watch the Late Show instead. After Leno returned to The Tonight Show, Leno regained his lead.

Letterman's shows have garnered both critical and industry praise, receiving 67 Emmy Award nominations, winning 12 times in his first 20 years in late night television. From 1993 to 2009, Letterman ranked higher than Leno in the annual Harris Poll of Nation's Favorite TV Personality 12 times. For example, in 2003 and 2004 Letterman ranked second in that poll, behind only Oprah Winfrey, a year that Leno was ranked fifth. Leno was higher than Letterman on that poll three times during the same period, in 1998, 2007, and 2008.

=== Hosting the Academy Awards ===
On March 27, 1995, Letterman hosted the 67th Academy Awards ceremony. Critics deemed his performance poor, saying that his irreverent style undermined the event's traditional importance and glamour. In a joke about their unusual names (inspired by a celebrated comic essay in The New Yorker, "Yma Dream" by Thomas Meehan), he started off by introducing Uma Thurman to Oprah Winfrey, and then both of them to Keanu Reeves: "Oprah...Uma. Uma...Oprah," "Have you kids met Keanu?" This and many of his other jokes fell flat. Letterman attracted the highest ratings to the annual telecast since 1983, but many felt the bad publicity he generated caused a decline in the Late Show's ratings.

Letterman recycled the apparent debacle into a long-running gag. On his first show after the Oscars, he joked, "Looking back, I had no idea that thing was being televised." He lampooned his stint two years later, during Billy Crystal's opening Oscar skit, which also parodied the plane-crashing scenes from that year's chief nominated film, The English Patient.

For years afterward, Letterman recounted his hosting the Oscars, although the Academy of Motion Picture Arts and Sciences continued to hold Letterman in high regard and invited him to host the Oscars again. On September 7, 2010, he made an appearance on the premiere of the 14th season of The View, and confirmed that he had been considered for hosting again.

=== Heart surgery hiatus ===
On January 14, 2000, a routine checkup revealed that an artery in Letterman's heart was severely obstructed. He was rushed to New York Presbyterian Hospital for emergency quintuple bypass surgery. During the first weeks of his recovery, reruns of the Late Show were shown and introduced by friends of Letterman, including Norm Macdonald, Drew Barrymore, Ray Romano, Robin Williams, Bonnie Hunt, Megan Mullally, Bill Murray, Regis Philbin, Charles Grodin, Nathan Lane, Julia Roberts, Bruce Willis, Jerry Seinfeld, Martin Short, Steven Seagal, Hillary Clinton, Danny DeVito, Steve Martin, Tom Snyder, and Sarah Jessica Parker.

Later, while still recovering from surgery, Letterman revived the late-night talk show tradition of "guest hosts" that had virtually disappeared on network television during the 1990s, allowing Bill Cosby, Kathie Lee Gifford, Dana Carvey, Janeane Garofalo, and others to host new episodes of the Late Show. Upon his return to the show on February 21, 2000, Letterman brought all but one of the doctors and nurses on stage who had participated in his surgery and recovery (with extra teasing of a nurse who had given him bed baths—"This woman gave me a bath!"), including Drs. O. Wayne Isom and Louis Aronne, who frequently appeared on the show.

For a number of episodes, Letterman continued to crack jokes about his bypass, including saying: "Bypass surgery: it's when doctors surgically create new blood flow to your heart. A bypass is what happened to me when I didn't get The Tonight Show! It's a whole different thing." In a later running gag, he lobbied Indiana to rename the freeway circling Indianapolis (I-465) "The David Letterman Bypass". He also featured a montage of faux news coverage of his bypass surgery, including a clip of Letterman's heart for sale on the Home Shopping Network. Letterman became friends with his doctors and nurses. In 2008, Rolling Stone wrote:

He hosted a doctor and nurse who'd helped perform the emergency quintuple-bypass heart surgery that saved his life in 2000. "These are people who were complete strangers when they opened my chest," he says. "And now, eight years later, they're among my best friends."

Additionally, Letterman invited the band Foo Fighters to play "Everlong", introducing them as "my favorite band, playing my favorite song."

In February 2003, Letterman again handed the reins of the show to several guest hosts (including Bill Cosby, Brad Garrett, Whoopi Goldberg, Elvis Costello, John McEnroe, Vince Vaughn, Will Ferrell, Bonnie Hunt, Luke Wilson, and bandleader Paul Shaffer) when he was diagnosed with a severe case of shingles. Later that year, Letterman made regular use of guest hosts—including Tom Arnold and Kelsey Grammer—for shows broadcast on Fridays. In March 2007, Adam Sandler, who had been scheduled to be the lead guest, served as a guest host while Letterman was ill with a stomach virus.

=== Second signing with CBS ===
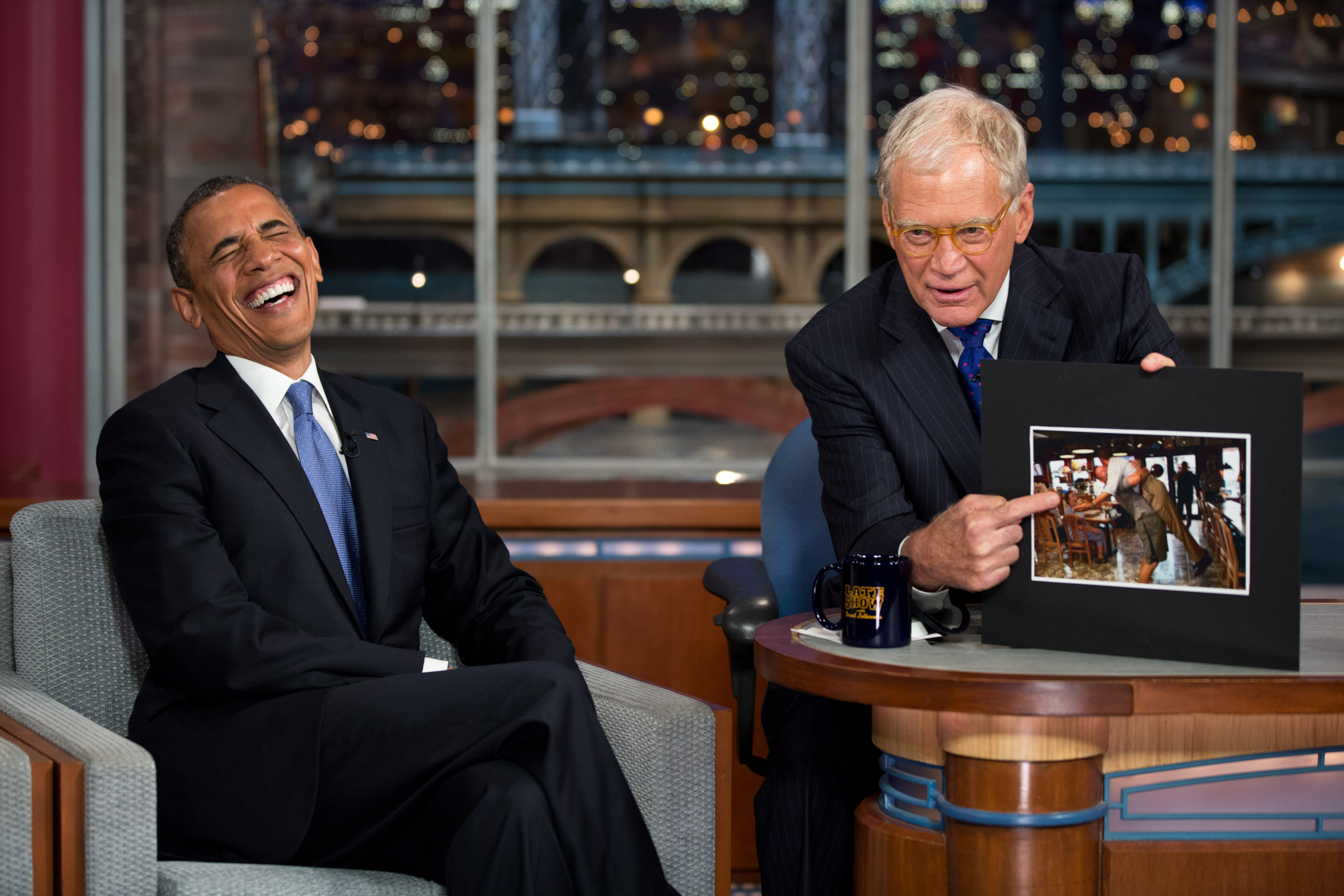
Letterman interviewing President Barack Obama in 2012

In March 2002, as Letterman's contract with CBS neared expiration, ABC offered him the time slot for long-running news program Nightline with Ted Koppel. Letterman was interested, as he believed he could never match Leno's ratings at CBS due to Letterman's complaint of weaker lead-ins from CBS's late local news programs, but was reluctant to replace Koppel. He addressed his decision to re-sign on the air, stating that he was content at CBS and that he had great respect for Koppel.

On December 4, 2006, CBS revealed that Letterman signed a new contract to host Late Show with David Letterman through the fall of 2010. "I'm thrilled to be continuing on at CBS," said Letterman. "At my age you really don't want to have to learn a new commute." Letterman further joked about the subject by pulling up his right pants leg, revealing a tattoo, presumably temporary, of the ABC logo.

"Thirteen years ago, David Letterman put CBS late night on the map and in the process became one of the defining icons of our network," said Leslie Moonves, president and CEO of CBS Corporation. "His presence on our air is an ongoing source of pride, and the creativity and imagination that the Late Show puts forth every night is an ongoing display of the highest quality entertainment. We are truly honored that one of the most revered and talented entertainers of our time will continue to call CBS 'home.'"

According to a 2007 article in Forbes magazine, Letterman earned $40 million a year. A 2009 article in The New York Times, however, said his salary was estimated at $32 million. In June 2009, Letterman's Worldwide Pants and CBS reached an agreement to continue the Late Show until at least August 2012. The previous contract had been set to expire in 2010, and the two-year extension was shorter than the typical three-year contract period negotiated in the past. Worldwide Pants agreed to lower its fee for the show, though it had remained a "solid moneymaker for CBS" under the previous contract.

On the February 3, 2011, edition of the Late Show, during an interview with Howard Stern, Letterman said he would continue to do his talk show for "maybe two years, I think." In April 2012, CBS announced it had extended its contract with Letterman through 2014. His contract was subsequently extended to 2015.

=== Retirement from Late Show ===
During the taping of his show on April 3, 2014, Letterman announced that he had informed CBS president Les Moonves that he would retire from hosting Late Show by May 20, 2015. Later in his retirement Letterman occasionally stated, in jest, that he had been fired. It was announced soon after that comedian and political satirist Stephen Colbert would succeed Letterman. Letterman's last episode aired on May 20, 2015, and opened with a presidential sendoff featuring four of the five living American presidents, George H. W. Bush, Bill Clinton, George W. Bush, and Barack Obama, each mimicking the late president Gerald Ford's statement "Our long national nightmare is over." It also featured cameos from The Simpsons and Wheel of Fortune (the latter with a puzzle saying "Good riddance to David Letterman"), a Top Ten List of "things I wish I could have said to David Letterman" performed by regular guests including Alec Baldwin, Barbara Walters, Steve Martin, Jerry Seinfeld, Jim Carrey, Chris Rock, Julia Louis-Dreyfus, Peyton Manning, Tina Fey, and Bill Murray, and closed with a montage of scenes from both his CBS and NBC series set to a live performance of "Everlong" by Foo Fighters.

The final episode of Late Show with David Letterman was watched by 13.76 million viewers in the United States with an audience share of 9.3/24, earning the show its highest ratings since following the 1994 Winter Olympics on February 25, 1994, and the show's highest demo numbers (4.1 in adults 25–54 and 3.1 in adults 18–49) since Oprah Winfrey's first Late Show appearance following the ending of her feud with Letterman on December 1, 2005. Bill Murray, who had been his first guest on Late Night, was his final guest on Late Show. In a rarity for a late-night show, it was also the highest-rated program on network television that night, beating out all prime-time shows. In total, Letterman hosted 6,080 episodes of Late Night and Late Show, surpassing friend and mentor Johnny Carson as the longest-serving late-night talk show host in American television history.

== Post–Late Show ==
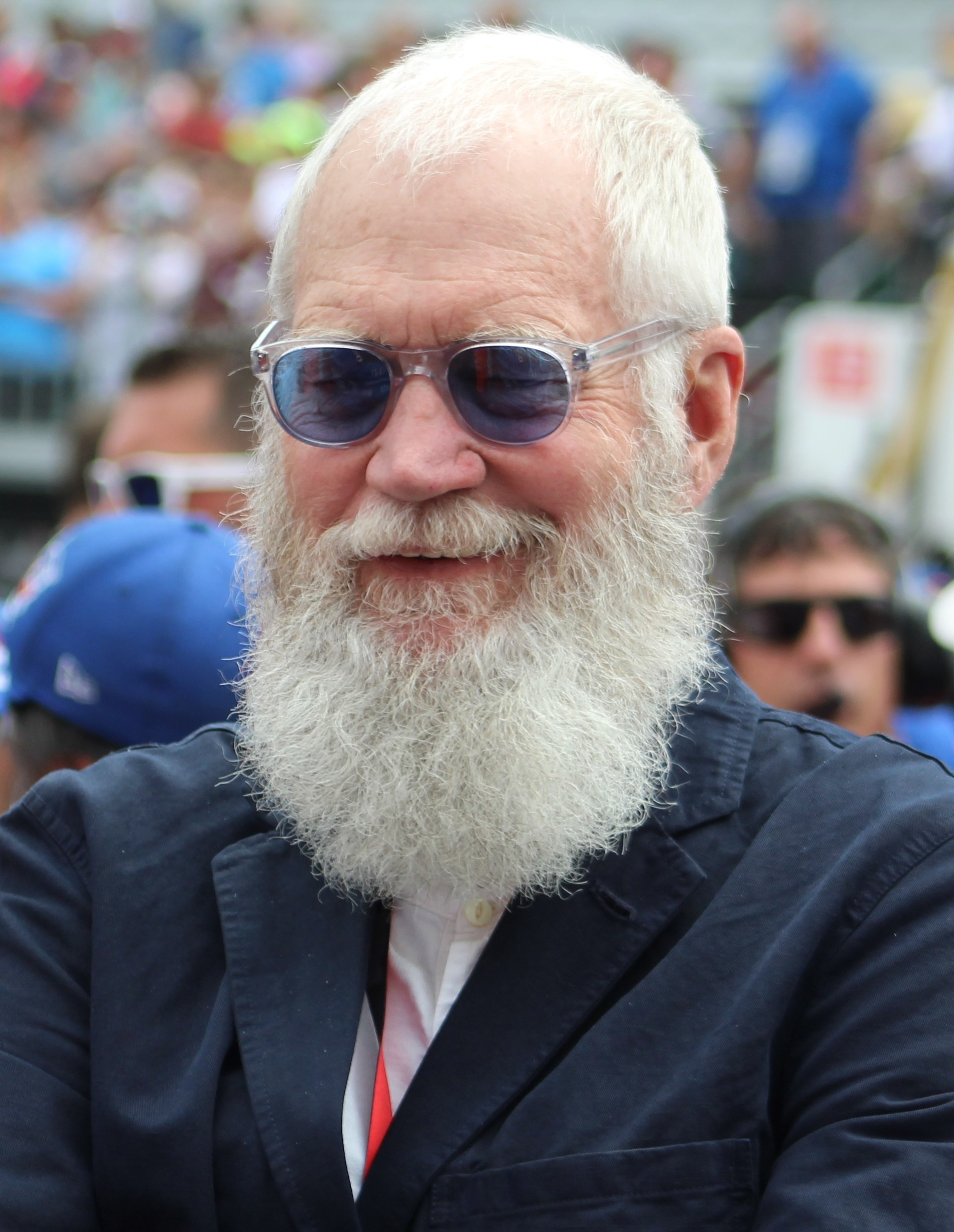
Letterman at the 2019 Indianapolis 500

In the months following the end of Late Show, Letterman was seen occasionally at sports events such as the Indianapolis 500, during which he submitted to an interview with a local publication. He made a surprise appearance on stage in San Antonio, Texas when he was invited up for an extended segment during Steve Martin's and Martin Short's A Very Stupid Conversation show, saying "I retired, and...I have no regrets," Letterman told the crowd after walking on stage. "I was happy. I'll make actual friends. I was complacent. I was satisfied. I was content, and then a couple of days ago Donald Trump said he was running for president. I have made the biggest mistake of my life, ladies and gentlemen" and then delivering a Top Ten List roasting Trump's presidential campaign followed by an onstage conversation with Martin and Short. Cellphone recordings of the appearance were posted on YouTube by audience members and widely reported in the media.

In 2016, Letterman joined the climate change documentary show Years of Living Dangerously as one of its celebrity correspondents. In season two's premiere episode, Letterman traveled to India to investigate the country's efforts to expand its inadequate energy grid, power its booming economy, and bring electricity to 300 million citizens for the first time. He also interviewed Indian Prime Minister Narendra Modi and traveled to rural villages where power is a scarce luxury and explored the United States' role in India's energy future.

On April 7, 2017, Letterman gave the induction speech for the band Pearl Jam into the Rock and Roll Hall of Fame at a ceremony held at the Barclays Center in Brooklyn, New York City. Also in 2017, Letterman and Alec Baldwin co-hosted The Essentials on Turner Classic Movies. Letterman and Baldwin introduced seven films for the series.

=== Netflix ===
In 2018, Letterman began hosting a six-episode monthly series of hour-long programs on Netflix consisting of long-form interviews and field segments. The show, My Next Guest Needs No Introduction with David Letterman, premiered January 12, 2018, with Barack Obama as its first guest. The second season premiered on May 31, 2019. Season 3 premiered on October 21, 2020, and includes Kim Kardashian West, Robert Downey Jr., Dave Chappelle and Lizzo as guests. Season 4 premiered on May 20, 2022, with Billie Eilish as the first guest. In October 2022, Letterman traveled to Kyiv, Ukraine, to film a special standalone episode of My Next Guest Needs No Introduction with David Letterman, interviewing Ukrainian president Volodymyr Zelenskyy. Season 6 premiered on December 16, 2025. A standalone episode with Adam Sandler premiered on December 1, 2025.

=== Letterman YouTube channel ===
In 2022, the existing Letterman YouTube channel, which included previously aired show clips, expanded to include new, original content featuring Letterman and former staffers Barbara Gaines and Mary Barclay, filmed by Walter Kim. During these segments, Letterman referred to himself and Barclay as guests on Gaines's show. Initially, Gaines corrected him, but eventually the conceit led to the series becoming known as "The Barbara Gaines Show".

== Notable exchanges and incidents ==
=== NBC and Johnny Carson ===
In spite of Johnny Carson's clear intention to hand over to Letterman, NBC selected Jay Leno to host The Tonight Show after Carson's departure. Letterman maintained a close relationship with Carson through his break with NBC. Three years after he left for CBS, HBO produced a made-for-television movie called The Late Shift, based on a book by The New York Times reporter Bill Carter, chronicling the battle between Letterman and Leno for the Tonight Show hosting spot.

Carson later made a few cameo appearances as a guest on Letterman's show. Carson's final television appearance was on May 13, 1994, on a Late Show episode taped in Los Angeles, when he made a surprise appearance during a Top 10 list segment. In early 2005, it was revealed that Carson occasionally sent jokes to Letterman, who used them in his monologue; according to CBS senior vice president Peter Lassally (a onetime producer for both men), Carson got "a big kick out of it." Letterman would do a characteristic Carson golf swing after delivering one of his jokes. In a tribute to Carson, all the opening monologue jokes during the first show after Carson's death were by Carson.

Lassally also said that Carson had always believed Letterman, not Leno, was his "rightful successor". During the early years of the Late Show's run, Letterman occasionally used some of Carson's trademark bits, including "Carnac the Magnificent" (with Paul Shaffer as Carnac), "Stump the Band", and the "Week in Review", sometimes accompanied by a courtesy call to Carson for his permission.

=== Oprah Winfrey ===
Oprah Winfrey appeared on Letterman's show when he was hosting NBC's Late Night on May 2, 1989. After that appearance, the two had a 16-year feud that arose, as Winfrey explained to Letterman after it had been resolved, as a result of the acerbic tone of their 1989 interview, of which she said that it "felt so uncomfortable to me that I didn't want to have that experience again." The feud apparently ended on December 2, 2005, when Winfrey appeared on CBS's Late Show with David Letterman in an event Letterman jokingly called "the Super Bowl of Love".

Winfrey and Letterman also appeared together in a Late Show promo aired during CBS's coverage of Super Bowl XLI in February 2007 with the two sitting next to each other on a couch watching the game. Since the game was played between the Indianapolis Colts and Chicago Bears, the Indianapolis-born Letterman wore a Peyton Manning jersey while Winfrey, whose show was taped in Chicago, wore a Brian Urlacher jersey. On September 10, 2007, Letterman made his first appearance on The Oprah Winfrey Show at Madison Square Garden in New York City.

Three years later, during CBS's coverage of Super Bowl XLIV between the Colts and the New Orleans Saints, the two appeared again in a Late Show promo, this time with Winfrey sitting on a couch between Letterman and Leno. Letterman wore the retired No. 70 jersey of Art Donovan, a member of the Colts' Hall of Fame and a regular Letterman guest. The appearance was Letterman's idea: Leno flew to New York City on an NBC corporate jet, sneaking into the Ed Sullivan Theater during the Late Show's February 4 taping wearing a disguise and meeting Winfrey and Letterman at a living room set created in the theater's balcony where they taped their promo.

Winfrey interviewed Letterman in January 2013 on Oprah's Next Chapter. They discussed their feud and Winfrey revealed that she had had a "terrible experience" while appearing on Letterman's show years earlier. Letterman could not recall the incident but apologized.

=== 2007–2008 writers' strike ===
Late Show went off air for eight weeks in 2007 during November and December because of the Writers Guild of America strike. Letterman's production company, Worldwide Pants, was the first company to make an individual agreement with the WGA, allowing his show to come back on the air on January 2, 2008. In his first episode back, he surprised the audience with a newly grown beard, which signified solidarity with the strike. His beard was shaved off during the show on January 7, 2008.

=== Palin joke ===
On June 8 and 9, 2009, Letterman told two sexually themed jokes about a daughter (never named) of Sarah Palin on his TV show. These included a joke that Palin's daughter had been "knocked up" by MLB player Alex Rodriguez. Palin was in New York City with her then 14-year-old daughter Willow, and none of her other children were at the game, but her 18-year-old daughter Bristol was the one who was pregnant. It was therefore unclear which daughter the joke referred to.

In a statement posted on the Internet, Palin said, "I doubt [Letterman would] ever dare make such comments about anyone else's daughter" and that "laughter incited by sexually perverted comments made by a 62-year-old male celebrity aimed at a 14-year-old girl is disgusting." On his June 10 show, Letterman responded to the controversy, saying the jokes were meant to be about Palin's 18-year-old daughter, Bristol, whose pregnancy as an unmarried teenager had caused some controversy during the United States presidential election of 2008. "These are not jokes made about [Palin's] 14-year-old daughter ... I would never, never make jokes about raping or having sex of any description with a 14-year-old girl."

His remarks did not end public criticism. The National Organization for Women (NOW) released a statement supporting Palin, noting that Letterman had made "[only] something of an apology." When the controversy failed to subside, Letterman addressed the issue again on his June 15 show, faulting himself for the error and apologizing "especially to the two daughters involved, Bristol and Willow, and also to the governor and her family and everybody else who was outraged by the joke." Rodriguez demanded an apology for implying that he was a child molester. Letterman never specifically apologized to Rodriguez.

=== Al-Qaeda death threat ===
On August 17, 2011, it was reported that an Islamist militant had posted a death threat against Letterman on a website frequented by Al-Qaeda supporters, calling on American Muslims to kill him for making a joke about the death of Ilyas Kashmiri, an Al-Qaeda leader who was killed in a June 2011 drone strike in Pakistan. In his August 22 show, Letterman joked about the threat, saying "State Department authorities are looking into this. They're not taking this lightly. They're looking into it. They're questioning, they're interrogating, there's an electronic trail—but everybody knows it's Leno."

== Appearances in other media ==
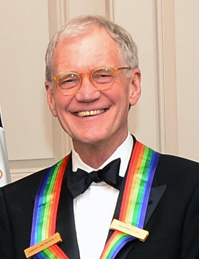
Letterman receiving the 2012 Kennedy Center Honors Medallion, December 2012

Letterman appeared in the pilot episode of the short-lived 1986 series Coach Toast, and appears with a bag over his head as a guest on Bonnie Hunt's 1990s sitcom The Building. He appeared in The Simpsons as himself in a couch gag when the Simpsons find themselves (and the couch) in Late Night with David Letterman. He had a cameo in the feature film Cabin Boy, with Chris Elliott, who worked as a writer for Letterman. In this and other appearances, Letterman is listed in the credits as "Earl Hofert", the name of Letterman's maternal grandfather. He also appeared as himself in the Howard Stern biographical film Private Parts and the 1999 Andy Kaufman biopic Man on the Moon, in a few episodes of Garry Shandling's 1990s TV series The Larry Sanders Show, and in "The Abstinence", a 1996 episode of the sitcom Seinfeld.

Letterman provided vocals for the Warren Zevon song "Hit Somebody" from My Ride's Here, and provided the voice for Butt-head's father in the 1996 animated film Beavis and Butt-Head Do America, again credited as Earl Hofert.

Letterman was the focus of The Avengers on "Late Night with David Letterman", issue 239 (January 1984) of the Marvel comic book series The Avengers, in which the title characters (specifically Hawkeye, Wonder Man, Black Widow, Beast, and Black Panther) are guests on Late Night. A parody of Letterman named David Endochrine is gassed to death along with his bandleader, Paul, and their audience in Frank Miller's The Dark Knight Returns. In SWAT Kats: The Radical Squadron, Letterman was parodied as "David Litterbin". Letterman appears in issues 13–14 and 18 of Harvey Pekar's autobiographical comic book American Splendor. Those issues show Pekar's accounts of appearances on Late Night.

In 2010, a documentary directed by Joke Fincioen and Biagio Messina, Dying to do Letterman, was released, featuring Steve Mazan, a standup comic, who has cancer and wants to appear on Letterman's show. The film won best documentary and jury awards at the Cinequest Film Festival. Mazan published a book of the same name (full title Dying to Do Letterman: Turning Someday into Today) about his own saga.

Letterman appeared as a guest on CNN's Piers Morgan Tonight on May 29, 2012, when he was interviewed by Regis Philbin, the guest host and Letterman's longtime friend. Philbin again interviewed Letterman (and Shaffer) while guest-hosting CBS's The Late Late Show (between the tenures of Craig Ferguson and James Corden) on January 27, 2015. In June 2013, Letterman appeared in the second episode of season two of Comedians in Cars Getting Coffee. On November 5, 2013, he and Bruce McCall published a fiction satire book, This Land Was Made for You and Me (But Mostly Me), ISBN 0-399-16368-9.

In Week 13 of the 2021 NFL season, Letterman joined Peyton and Eli Manning on their Manningcast feed of the Monday Night Football game between the New England Patriots and Buffalo Bills. Letterman mocked Bill Belichick after he was caught on camera wiping his nose with his shirt, and was in the middle of recalling being with Roger Goodell when Goodell was booed at the unveiling of Peyton Manning's statue in Indianapolis when ESPN suddenly cut to commercials.

On February 1, 2022, Letterman was the guest on Late Night with Seth Meyers, marking the 40th anniversary of the franchise's debut. On November 20, 2023, Letterman returned to the Ed Sullivan Theater on The Late Show with Stephen Colbert. On February 10, 2025, Letterman appeared on The Tonight Show Starring Jimmy Fallon while Paul Shaffer and the World's Most Dangerous Band were the guest house band, marking Letterman's first appearance on The Tonight Show since Carson was host.

== Business ventures ==
Letterman started his production company, Worldwide Pants Incorporated, which produced his show and several others, in 1991. The company also produces feature films and documentaries and founded its own record label, Clear Entertainment. Worldwide Pants received significant attention in December 2007 after it was announced that it had independently negotiated its own contract with the Writers Guild of America, East, thus allowing Letterman, Craig Ferguson, and their writers to return to work, while the union continued its strike against production companies, networks, and studios with whom it had not yet reached agreements.

Letterman, Bobby Rahal, and Mike Lanigan of Mi-Jack Products co-own Rahal Letterman Lanigan Racing, an auto racing team competing in the WeatherTech SportsCar Championship and NTT IndyCar series. The team has twice won the Indianapolis 500: in 2004 with driver Buddy Rice, and in 2020 with Takuma Sato.

The Letterman Foundation for Courtesy and Grooming is a private foundation through which Letterman has donated millions of dollars to charities and other nonprofit organizations in Indiana and Montana, Habitat for Humanity International, Ball State University, and the American Cancer Society.

== Influences ==
Letterman's biggest influence and mentor was Johnny Carson. Other comedians who influenced Letterman were Paul Dixon, Steve Allen, Jonathan Winters, Garry Moore, Jack Paar, Don Rickles, and David Brenner. Although Ernie Kovacs has also been mentioned as an influence, Letterman has denied this.

Comedians influenced by Letterman include Conan O'Brien, Jon Stewart, Stephen Colbert, Ray Romano, Jimmy Kimmel, Jay Leno, Arsenio Hall, Larry Wilmore, Seth Meyers, Norm Macdonald, Jimmy Fallon, John Oliver, and James Corden.

== Personal life ==
Letterman has tinnitus, sometimes a symptom of hearing loss. On the Late Show in 1996, he talked about his experience with tinnitus during an interview with William Shatner, who has severe tinnitus caused by an on-set explosion. Letterman has said that he was initially unable to pinpoint the noise inside his head and that he hears a constant ringing in his ears.

Letterman is a teetotaler. On more than one occasion, he said that he had once been a "horrible alcoholic" and had begun drinking around the age of 11 or 13 and continued until 1981 when he was 34. He has said that in 1981, "I was drunk 80% of the time ... I loved it. I was one of those guys, I looked around, and everyone else had stopped drinking and I couldn't understand why." When he was shown drinking what appears to be alcohol on the Late Show, it was actually apple juice.

In 2015, Letterman said of his anxiety: "For years and years and years—30, 40 years—I was anxious and hypochondriacal and an alcoholic, and many, many other things that made me different from other people." He became calmer through a combination of Transcendental Meditation and low doses of medication. Letterman is a Presbyterian, a religious tradition he was originally brought up in by his mother, though he once said he was motivated by "Lutheran, Midwestern guilt".

In August 2021, Letterman was hospitalized in Providence, Rhode Island, after hitting his head on the sidewalk and falling unconscious. He favorably recalled the care he received at Rhode Island Hospital in a video released by the hospital's owner.

=== Marriages, relationships, and family ===
Letterman on becoming a father late in life, 2022

On July 2, 1968, Letterman married his college sweetheart, Michelle Cook, in Muncie, Indiana; they divorced in 1977. He also had a long-term cohabiting relationship with the former head writer and producer on Late Night, Merrill Markoe, from 1978 to 1988. Markoe created several Late Night staples, such as "Stupid Pet/Human Tricks". Time magazine wrote that theirs was the defining relationship of Letterman's career, with Markoe also acting as his writing partner. She "put the surrealism in Letterman's comedy."

Letterman and Regina Lasko started dating in February 1986, while he was still living with Markoe. Lasko gave birth to their son, Harry Joseph Letterman, on November 3, 2003. Harry is named after Letterman's father. In 2005, police discovered a plot to kidnap Letterman's son and demand a $5 million ransom. Kelly Frank, a house painter who had worked for Letterman, was charged in the conspiracy.

Letterman and Lasko wed on March 19, 2009, in a quiet courthouse civil ceremony in Choteau, Montana, where he had purchased a ranch in 1999. Letterman announced the marriage during the taping of his show of March 23, shortly after congratulating Bruce Willis on his marriage the week before. Letterman told the audience he nearly missed the ceremony because his truck became stuck in mud two miles from their house. The family resides in North Salem, New York, on a 108-acre (44-hectare) estate. As of 2026, they have a Labrador named Doc.

=== Friendship with Foo Fighters ===
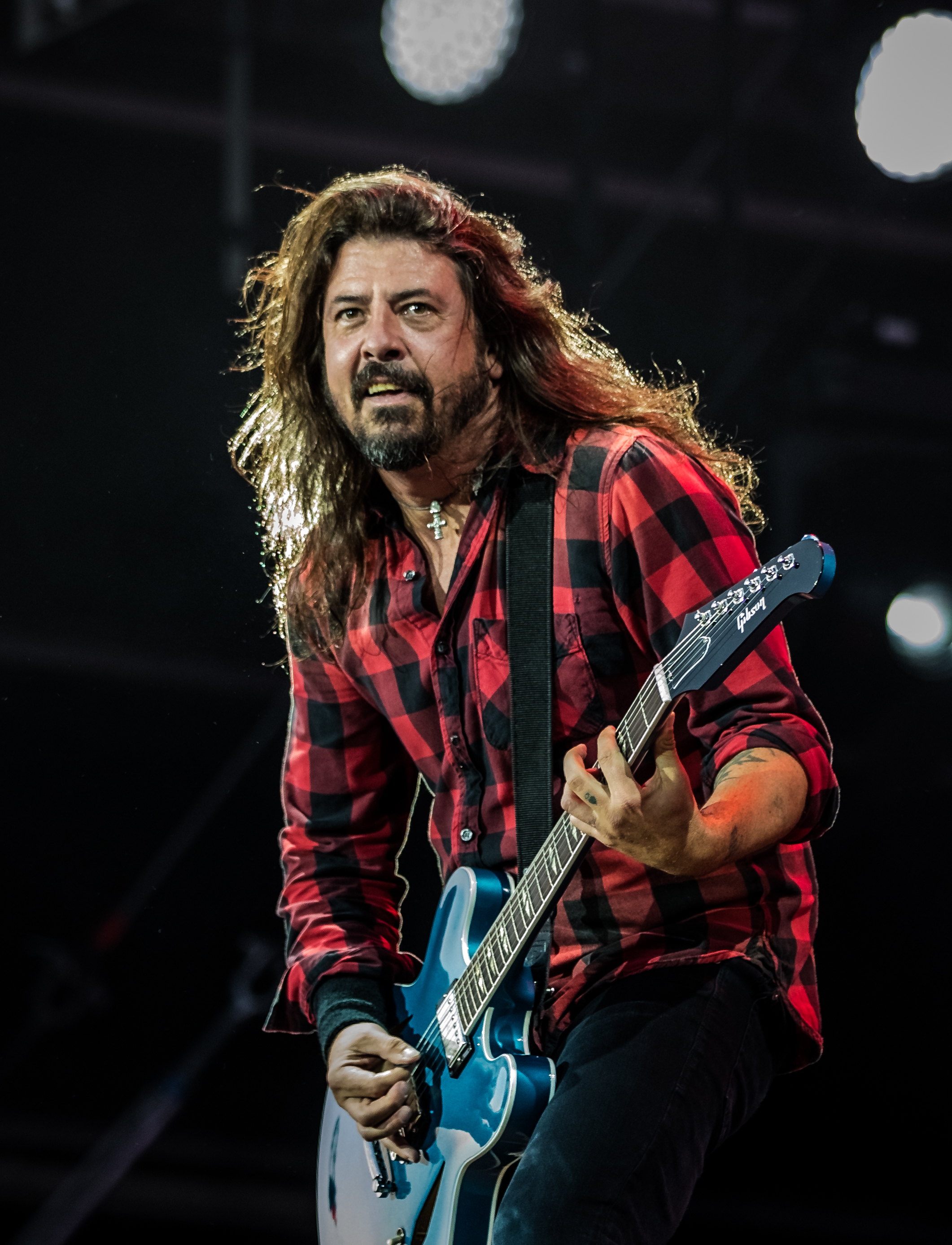
Dave Grohl was a frequent guest on The Late Show and performed on the program several times with Foo Fighters between 1995 and 2014, and on its final episode in 2015.

Letterman has had a close relationship with the rock band Foo Fighters since its appearance on his first show upon his return from heart surgery. The band appeared many times on the Late Show, including a week-long stint in October 2014. While introducing the band's performance of "Miracle" on the October 17, 2014, show, Letterman told the story of how a souvenir video of himself and his four-year-old son learning to ski used the song as background music, unbeknownst to Letterman until he saw it. He said: "This is the second song of theirs that will always have great, great meaning for me for the rest of my life". This was the first time the band had heard this story. Worldwide Pants co-produced Dave Grohl's Sonic Highways TV series. "Letterman was the first person to get behind this project", Grohl said.

During Letterman's last show, on which Foo Fighters appeared, Letterman said that Foo Fighters had been in the middle of a South American tour that they canceled to play on his comeback episode.

=== Extortion attempt and revelation of affairs ===
On October 1, 2009, Letterman announced on his show that he had been the victim of an extortion attempt by a person threatening to reveal his sexual relationships with several of his female employees—a fact Letterman immediately thereafter confirmed. He said that someone had left a package in his car with material he said he would write into a screenplay and a book if Letterman did not pay him $2 million. Letterman said that he contacted the Manhattan District Attorney's office and partook in a sting operation that involved the handover of a fake check to the extortionist.

Joe Halderman, a producer of the CBS news magazine television series 48 Hours, was arrested around noon (EDT) on October 1, 2009, after trying to deposit the check. He was indicted by a Manhattan grand jury following testimony from Letterman and pleaded not guilty to a charge of attempted grand larceny on October 2, 2009. Halderman pleaded guilty in March 2010 and was sentenced to six months in prison, followed by probation and community service.

A central figure in the case and one of the women with whom Letterman had had a sexual relationship was his longtime personal assistant Stephanie Birkitt, who often appeared on the show. She had also worked for 48 Hours. Until a month before the revelations, she had shared a residence with Halderman, who allegedly had copied her personal diary and used it, along with private emails, in the blackmail package.

In the days following the initial announcement of the affairs and the arrest, several prominent women, including Kathie Lee Gifford, co-host of NBC's Today Show, and NBC news anchor Ann Curry, questioned whether Letterman's affairs with subordinates created an unfair working environment. A spokesman for Worldwide Pants said that the company's sexual harassment policy did not prohibit sexual relationships between managers and employees. According to business news reporter Eve Tahmincioglu, "CBS suppliers are supposed to follow the company's business conduct policies" and the CBS 2008 Business Conduct Statement states that "If a consenting romantic or sexual relationship between a supervisor and a direct or indirect subordinate should develop, CBS requires the supervisor to disclose this information to his or her Company's Human Resources Department".

On October 3, 2009, TMZ reported that a former CBS employee, Holly Hester, had had a yearlong secret affair with Letterman in the early 1990s while she was his intern and a student at New York University. On October 5, 2009, Letterman devoted a segment of his show to a public apology to his wife and staff. Three days later, Worldwide Pants announced that Birkitt had been placed on a "paid leave of absence" from the Late Show.

=== Stalking incidents ===
Beginning in May 1988, Letterman was stalked by Margaret Mary Ray, a woman with schizophrenia. She stole his Porsche, camped out on his tennis court, and repeatedly broke into his house. Her exploits drew national attention, with Letterman occasionally joking about her on his show, though he never named her. After she died by suicide at age 46 in October 1998, Letterman told The New York Times that he had great compassion for her. A spokesperson for Letterman said: "This is a sad ending to a confused life."

In 2005, a woman was able to obtain a restraining order from a New Mexico judge, prohibiting Letterman from contacting her. She claimed he had sent her coded messages via his television program, causing her bankruptcy and emotional distress. Law professor Eugene Volokh called the case "patently frivolous".

=== Interests ===
Letterman is a car enthusiast and owns an extensive collection. In 2012, it was reported that the collection consisted of ten Ferraris, eight Porsches, four Austin-Healeys, two Honda motorcycles, a Chevy pickup, and one car each from automakers Mercedes-Benz, Jaguar, MG, Volvo, Cadillac and Pontiac. He often drives two electric vehicles, a Tesla Model S and a Mercedes.

In his 2013 appearance on Comedians in Cars Getting Coffee, part of Jerry Seinfeld's conversation with Letterman was filmed in Letterman's 1995 Volvo 960 station wagon, which is powered by a 380-horsepower racing engine. Paul Newman had the car built for Letterman.

== Filmography ==
=== Film ===
Year	Title	Role	Notes
1994	Cabin Boy	Old Salt In Fishing Village	Credited as Earl Hofert
1996	Eddie	Himself	Cameo
1996	Beavis and Butt-Head Do America	Mötley Crüe roadie (voice)	Credited as Earl Hofert
1997	Private Parts	Himself	Cameo
1999	Man on the Moon	Himself	Cameo
2005	Grizzly Man	Himself	Archive footage from a 2001 Late Show with David Letterman episode starring Timothy Treadwell; Cut for the DVD release
2005	Strangers with Candy	none	Executive producer
2016	Sully	Himself	Cameo
2019	Between Two Ferns: The Movie	Himself	
2022	Norm Macdonald: Nothing Special	Himself	Stand-up special
2024	The Easy Kind	Dave	

=== Television ===
Year	Title	Role(s)	Notes
1977	The Starland Vocal Band Show	Announcer / Various	6 episodes
1978	Mary	Announcer / Various	3 episodes
1978	Peeping Times	Dan Cochran	Television film
1979	Fast Friends	Matt Morgan	Television film
1979	Mork & Mindy	Ellsworth	Episode: "Mork Goes Erk"
1979	The Mary Tyler Moore Hour	Various roles	8 episodes
1979	Password Plus	Himself	Game Show Participant / Celebrity Guest Star
1980	The David Letterman Show	Himself (host)	90 episodes; also creator, writer and executive producer
1981	David Letterman: Looking for Fun	Himself	HBO special
1981	Open All Night	Man in Suit	Episode: "Buckaroo Buddies"
1982–1993	Late Night with David Letterman	Himself (host)	1,819 episodes; also creator, writer and executive producer
1986	38th Primetime Emmy Awards	Himself (co-host)	Special
1993–2015	Late Show with David Letterman	Himself (host)	4,263 episodes; also creator, writer and executive producer
1993	Murphy Brown	Himself	Episode: "Bump in the Night"
1993	The Building	The Thief	Episode: "Damned If You Do"; also executive producer
1993–1995	The Larry Sanders Show	Himself	2 episodes
1994	Beavis and Butt-Head	Himself (voice)	Episode: "Late Night with Butt-head"
1995	67th Academy Awards	Himself (host)	Television special
1995–1999	The Late Late Show with Tom Snyder	none	777 episodes; co-creator and executive producer
1995–1996	Bonnie	none	13 episodes; also executive producer
1995	The Nanny	Himself	Episode: "Pen Pal"
1995	Favorite Deadly Sins	Himself	Television film
1996	The Dana Carvey Show	Himself	Episode: "The Diet Mug Root Beer Dana Carvey Show"
1996	Seinfeld	Himself	Episode: "The Abstinence"
1996	The High Life	none	8 episodes; also executive producer
1996–2005	Everybody Loves Raymond	none	210 episodes; also executive producer
1997–1998	Spin City	Himself / Rags	2 episodes
1998	Cosby	Himself	Episode "Fifteen Minutes of Fame"
1999–2004	The Late Late Show with Craig Kilborn	none	1,190 episodes; co-creator and executive producer
2000–2004	ED	none	83 episodes; executive producer
2005–2014	The Late Late Show with Craig Ferguson	none	2,058 episodes; co-creator and executive producer
2007	The Knights of Prosperity	none	13 episodes; also executive producer
2012	The Simpsons	Himself (voice)	Episode: "The D'oh-cial Network"
2018–present	My Next Guest Needs No Introduction with David Letterman	Himself (host)	Also creator, writer and executive producer
2020	The Comedy Store	Himself	5 episodes
2022	That's My Time with David Letterman	Himself (host)	6 episodes
2024	Stupid Pet Tricks	Himself	Episode: "Late Night Memories"; also executive producer
2024	John Mulaney Presents: Everybody's in LA	Himself	Episode: "Earthquakes"

== Awards, honors and legacy ==
=== David Letterman Communication and Media Building ===
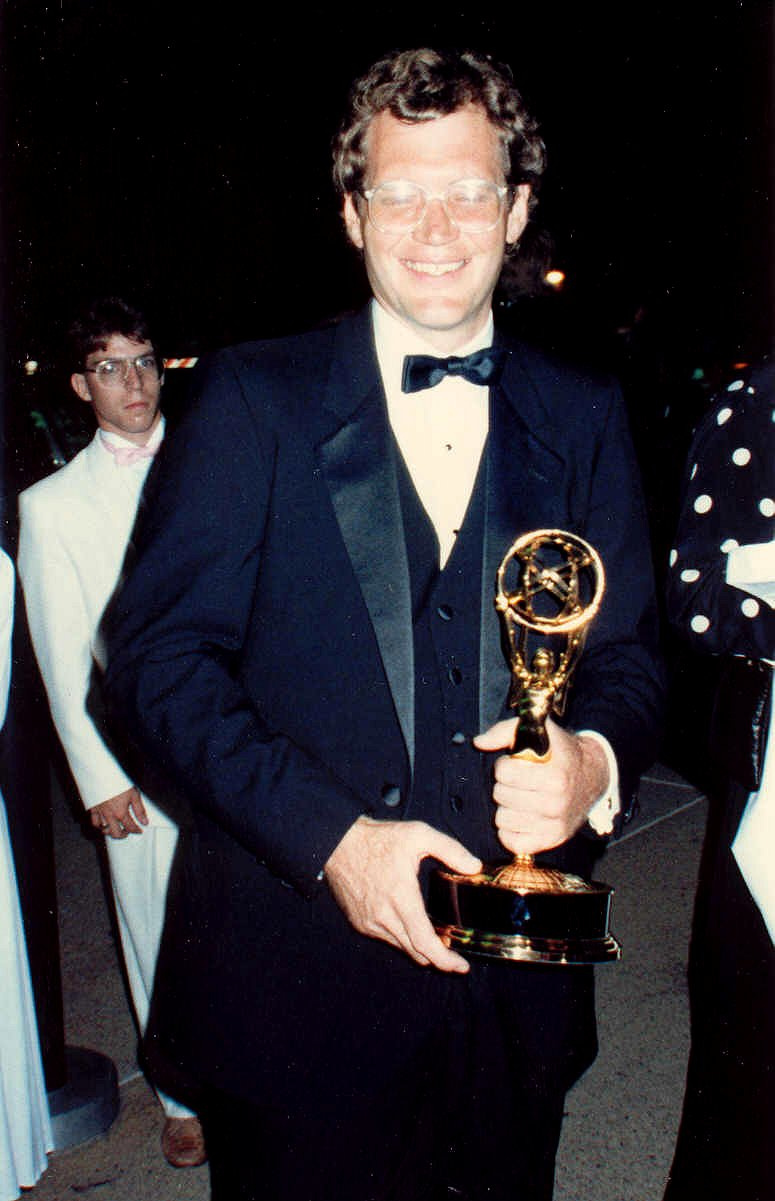
Letterman at the 39th Primetime Emmy Awards in 1987

In 1996, Letterman was ranked 45th on TV Guide's 50 Greatest TV Stars of All Time. In 2002, The Late Show with David Letterman was ranked seventh on TV Guide's 50 Greatest TV Shows of All Time.

On September 7, 2007, Letterman visited his alma mater, Ball State University in Muncie, Indiana, for the dedication of a communications facility named in his honor for his dedication to the university. The $21 million, 75,000-square-foot (7,000 m^{2}) David Letterman Communication and Media Building opened for the 2007 fall semester. Thousands of Ball State students, faculty, and local residents welcomed Letterman back to Indiana. Letterman's emotional speech touched on his struggles as a college student and his late father, and also included the "top ten good things about having your name on a building", finishing with "if reasonable people can put my name on a $21 million building, anything is possible." Over many years Letterman "has provided substantial assistance to [Ball State's] Department of Telecommunications, including an annual scholarship that bears his name."

At the same time, Indiana Governor Mitch Daniels gave Letterman a Sagamore of the Wabash award, which recognizes distinguished service to the state of Indiana.

=== Awards and nominations ===
In his capacities as a performer, producer, or as part of a writing team, Letterman is among the most nominated people in the history of the Emmy Awards, with 52 nominations, winning two Daytime Emmys and ten Primetime Emmys since 1981. He won four American Comedy Awards and in 2011 became the first recipient of the Johnny Carson Award for Comedic Excellence at The Comedy Awards.

Letterman was a recipient of the 2012 Kennedy Center Honors, where he was called "one of the most influential personalities in the history of television, entertaining an entire generation of late-night viewers with his unconventional wit and charm." On May 16, 2017, Letterman was named the next recipient of the Mark Twain Prize for American Humor, the award granted annually by the John F. Kennedy Center for the Performing Arts. He received the prize in a ceremony on October 22, 2017.

=== The Letterman Foundation for Courtesy and Grooming ===
The Letterman Foundation for Courtesy and Grooming (LFCG) was an American private foundation whose president and primary contributor was David Letterman. Its treasurer was Fred Nigro, who has appeared on Late Show with David Letterman, where he has been identified as Letterman's accountant. The foundation operated out of Nigro's Los Angeles offices. LFCG was founded in August 1993 as the DL Foundation. Since at least 2001, LFCG was known as the American Foundation for Courtesy and Grooming, until it assumed its current name, in 2011.

According to LFCG's tax returns (Form 990-PF), made available by the Foundation Center, for the years from 2001 through 2011, LFCG donated a total of over $9.2 million to various foundations and other organizations.
