= Biagio Messina =

American TV producer and filmmaker

Biagio Messina is an American television producer, director, showrunner, filmmaker, and actor.

== Background ==
His hometown is Cleveland, Ohio. Messina graduated from Parma Senior High School, which is located near Cleveland, Ohio. While still in high school, he wrote the play Me and Grandma. It won the Marilyn Bianci Young Playwrights Festival and was produced at Dobama Theater.

== Career ==
He played the role of Marc Cram on the Nickelodeon sitcom Kenan & Kel. Other acting jobs included Nickelodeon’s All That and NBC’s medical drama ER. His filmmaking credits include the feature-length, theatrically released documentary Dying to do Letterman, which was invited by the International Documentary Association to qualify for the Academy Award consideration. Messina's television producing credits include the VH1 reality TV series Scream Queens, the MTV documentary series Caged, The CW reality show Beauty and the Geek, and the MTV True Life Presents documentary Secrets, Lies, and Sex. Messina has produced and contributed to over one-hundred hours of TV and film.

He later made a feature film based on the play. The film was funded with money he won on a gameshow called Majority Rules. Messina wrote, directed, and acted in the screen-adaptation of the play, which was produced in conjunction with future wife Fincioen. While that film did not achieve major distribution, the work helped him land the role of Marc Cram on Kenan & Kel.

He continued producing and directing TV and film. According to the book Small Screen, Big Picture by Chad Gervich, Messina has made "countless hours of television for both broadcast and cable networks."

== Personal life ==
He is married to Joke Fincioen, his wife and business partner. Together they own and run the TV and film production company Joke Productions. The married team collaborates on their film and TV productions. They also podcast and blog about the entertainment industry. They are known professionally and often credited as Joke and Biagio.
