= Dying to Do Letterman =

- Film poster
- Directed by: Joke Fincioen; Biagio Messina
- Written by: Steve Mazan
- Produced by: Joke Fincioen; Biagio Messina
- Narrated by: Steve Mazan
- Cinematography: Adam Sampson
- Edited by: Joke Fincioen; Biagio Messina
- Music by: Dave Pelman
- Production company: Joke Productions
- Distributed by: Oscilloscope Laboratories
- Release dates: March 4, 2011 (Cinequest Film Festival); August 26, 2011 (United States)
- Running time: 75 minutes
- Country: United States
- Language: English

Dying to do Letterman is a 2011 documentary film, directed by Joke Fincioen and Biagio Messina, and produced under their Joke Productions banner. The documentary follows the journey of Steve Mazan, a stand up comedian with the lifelong dream of performing a comedy routine on the Late Show with David Letterman.

However, Mazan's quest takes a turn when he is diagnosed with inoperable liver cancer, and informed he may only have five years to live.

The film follows his decision to spend what time he has left chasing his dream to perform on Letterman's stage. Dying to Do Letterman also looks at the historic impact David Letterman had on the comedy world. Notable appearances in the documentary include Ray Romano, Kevin Nealon, Jim Gaffigan, Brian Regan, Arj Barker, Will Durst and Robert Schimmel.

Mazan acted as narrator for the film, speaking directly into camera from behind a large microphone on an empty comedy stage.

The film won numerous audience and grand jury awards on the film festival circuit, and was invited by the International Documentary Association to qualify for Academy Award consideration through the 2011 DocuWeeks program.

The film's Kickstarter for an Oscar crowdfunding campaign also received press attention, as reported by Indiewire, who noted the Kickstarter project for Dying to Do Letterman raised $20,000 in just two days.

After a theatrical release through the 2011 DocuWeeks program, Dying to Do Letterman was acquired for distribution by Oscilloscope Laboratories.

Of the film's premise, The Chicago Daily Herald said, "There's nothing like a little incurable cancer to kick-start someone's attempt to fulfill a lifelong dream."

== Synopsis ==
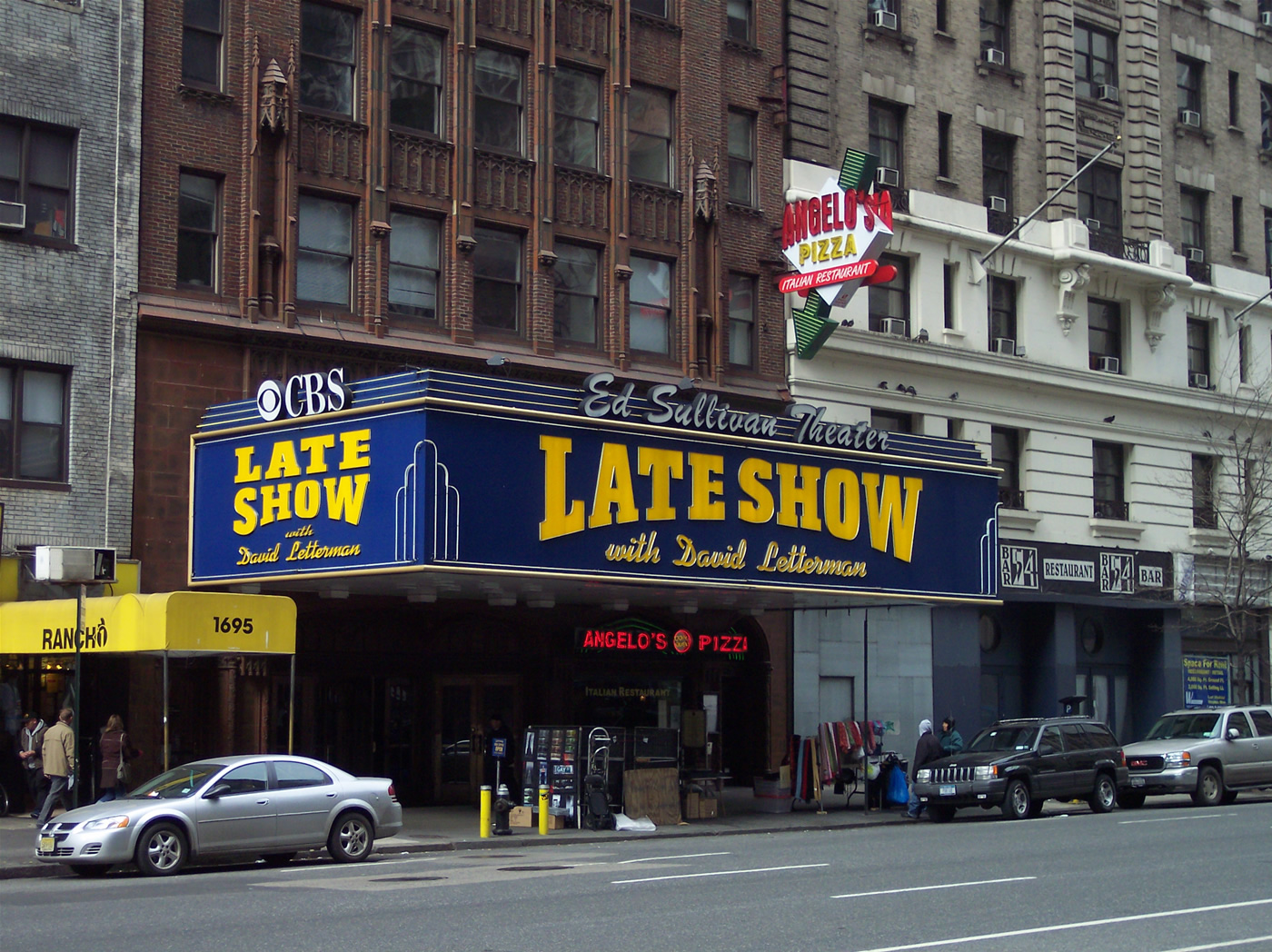
Late Show with David Letterman, filmed at the Ed Sullivan Theater

The film begins on an empty comedy stage with a large microphone. Steve Mazan enters and speaks directly into camera. This narrative device is used throughout the film. Mazan explains that since he was a young boy, he dreamed of performing on David Letterman's show. He became a professional stand-up comedian, and performed shows around the country in hopes of one day making it to the Ed Sullivan Theater where the Late Show with David Letterman was taped before a live studio audience. He then learns he has cancer, and may only have five years to live. His girlfriend at the time, Denise, is shocked by the news, but the couple makes the decision to get married. Together, they also decide that Steve should spend the time he has left pursuing his dream of performing on Letterman's show.

Mazan launches his Dying to Do Letterman campaign, asking people to email the Late Show with David Letterman staff with the subject line "Book Mazan." Hundreds of emails are sent on Mazan's behalf. He receives a letter from an executive producer of The Late Show. The letter states that many sick people with emotional stories write to the show and ask to appear in an episode, but as a policy they cannot honor such requests. Undeterred, Steve decides to perform more comedy shows, write new material, and seek advice from professional comedians who have appeared on Letterman.

As the film progresses, Steve sits down with numerous comedians who are veterans of David Letterman's show. These include Ray Romano, Kevin Nealon, Jim Gaffigan, Brian Regan, Arj Barker, and Will Durst. The conversations cover why Letterman was so important to them, and explore how the comedians achieved their first appearance on Letterman's stage. The comics also offer advice to Mazan on his quest. Interspersed with the comedian interviews and Mazan's writing process are scenes tracking Mazan's health. His cancer is growing slowly, but Mazan is informed that the tumors on his liver could quickly accelerate their growth at any time, which would likely lead to his death. During this process, Mazan manages to send a DVD of his act to Letterman's booker, Eddie Brill. Brill likes Steve but thinks his material is wrong. He offers Mazan advice on how to tweak his act for the show, but makes no promises about booking him.

Mazan continues to write and test new material. The process includes a trip to Iraq where Mazan performs for American troops. During the performance, the base is bombed. Cameras catch Mazan and the comedy show audience running through the night as an ammunition dump explodes behind them, but Mazan escapes unharmed. He jokes that "it's not just cancer that can kill you." He continues to send off new material to Letterman's booker, Brill. Despite many submissions, several years pass and Mazan receives no communication from the show. He begins to believe that he won't be booked, and decides it may be time to give up on his Letterman dream. At that time Mazan sits down with another comedian diagnosed with cancer, Robert Schimmel. Schimmel encourages Steve to continue his journey and keep chasing his dream. A title card then informs viewers that Schimmel died shortly thereafter.

Mazan makes a final audition DVD for Letterman's show and sends it off. Letterman's booker Eddie Brill likes the DVD and wants to book Mazan. However, comedians are often cancelled at the last minute, and Mazan won't know if he will perform until right before showtime. The film ends as Mazan takes the Letterman stage. Title cards inform viewers that on September 4, 2009, Mazan performed on the Letterman show. He received five applause breaks, and his sickness was never mentioned. A quick shot of Mazan then reveals that he is still alive and healthy.

Over the final credits the film shows a montage of Mazan practicing his final routine at comedy clubs intercut with the actual Letterman performance. The routine centers on key cards that become demagnetized, and the frustrations of being locked out of one's hotel room.

== Narration style ==
For the narration of Dying to Do Letterman, Mazan delivers his backstory and commentary from a stage in an empty comedy club. Mazan speaks directly into camera. He also occasionally interacts with props such as a ticking clock and a running hourglass.

Of the device, The Plain Dealer said:

You know you're in for a weird and wonderful ride when a little more than nine minutes into the story of Steve Mazan's quest to make it onto the "Late Show With David Letterman," the comic busts out his "Top 10 Benefits of Catching Cancer" (3. Blame hair loss on chemotherapy rather than on male pattern baldness.)

Internet Reviews said, "Steve is not only funny, he is a really likable guy, which comes through in spades in the very insightful narration he does for his life story."

Screen Comment felt the narration device was unnecessary.

== Production ==
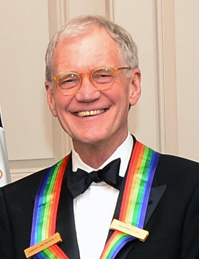
David Letterman in 2012

Dying to Do Letterman was self-funded by directors Biagio Messina and Joke Fincioen, who invested their life savings making the film. The entire production took five years. Footage for the film was acquired between 2006 and 2009. Editing took place throughout the filming, and was completed in 2011.

=== Development ===
In 2005, Mazan learned he had cancer, and said after he went through the stages of grief, he decided he'd like to launch a campaign to perform on Letterman's show. As depicted in the film, Mazan launched the original Dying to Do Letterman site, and began shooting videos of himself discussing his quest in early 2006.

=== Pre-production ===
Deciding he'd like to fully document his journey, Mazan connected with Joke Fincioen and Biagio Messina, a married, filmmaking and TV producing duo. They had edited a comedy reel for Mazan in 2003. Since the filmmakers also considered Mazan a friend, they were concerned about making a documentary following his story. Fincioen warned that if the journey did not go as planned, or if Mazan fell on bad times, they could not put the camera down and stop filming.

Of the potential filmmaking/friendship conflict, Screen Comment said: "Fincioen and Messina generally refrain from lionizing Mazan's predicament, a considerable achievement given that both are close friends with him. They are not afraid to show his stubborn and mopey side, or the effect that his single-mindedness has on Denise."

In an interview with MovieMaker Magazine Messina stated that Mazan's only creative input before filming was, "Even if I die, you have to finish the documentary and still make it funny. I don't want to make a depressing cancer movie."

Of the story, Messina said he felt the documentary had to present two concepts in order for the story to work:

On our own documentary Dying to do Letterman, there are two hooks. 1. A man chases his life-long dream of performing on the David Letterman show. 2. He learns he only has five years to live. Either hook on its own is really not enough to carry the film. Combined, they made for a much deeper movie: When a man learns he only has five years to live, he dedicates his life to living his dream of performing on Letterman.

As they prepared for more in-depth filming, the entire team began reaching out to bookers and comedians who might be able to help with Mazan's quest.

=== Production ===
Much of the footage was personally filmed by Mazan on small camcorders. The filmmakers built a mock comedy club which was used for Mazan's narration. It was designed by Elvis Strange. To save money, the filmmakers recorded most of the interviews on a $15 clip-on microphone purchased at Radio Shack.

=== Post-production ===
Messina and Fincioen edited the film together from 300 hours of footage they had captured over the years. Music was provided by Dave Pelman Music.

== Marketing ==
The filmmakers used a variety of grassroots techniques to promote the film, including both real-world and virtual approaches.

=== Street team ===
Mazan, Messina, Fincioen, and volunteers visited film festivals dressed in hospital scrubs while passing out flyers for Dying to Do Letterman. They also passed out buttons which read, "I'm Dying To ..." followed by a blank space. Festival goers were encouraged to share their own dreams with the street team. The filmmakers would then write those dreams on the buttons with a marker, and the pin it on the people sharing their dreams. The technique was cited as winning them fans in several cities. The filmmakers posted photos and videos of the buttons with others' dreams featured on them as part of their online campaign.

Actor Michael Rooker (Guardians of the Galaxy, The Walking Dead, Henry: Portrait of a Serial Killer) joined the street team in San Jose to help promote the film at its world premiere, part of the Cinequest Film Festival.

=== Kickstarter campaign ===
Once Dying to Do Letterman was invited to participate in DocuWeeks by the International Documentary Association, the filmmakers launched a Kickstarter campaign to help cover their costs and thus qualify for Academy Award consideration.

Dubbed Kickstarter for an Oscar the campaign set out to raise $37,000 to pay for promotion, travel, and screenings related to the expenses of participating in DocuWeeks. According to TheWrap: "For an independent documentary, qualifying for the Academy Awards isn't easy, or cheap. But one of this year's hopefuls has found a new way to raise money: a crowd-funding campaign based on the simple plea, "Help us qualify for an Academy Award." Michael Lumpkin, executive director of the International Documentary Association, said of the Kickstarter Campaign: "[It] shows the filmmaking community how to successfully use some of these new online tools to raise money for documentary films."

The campaign raised a total of $57,569 from 614 backers. Of the Kickstarter project, Indiewire highlighted the fact that Dying to do Letterman raised $20,000 in just two days.

=== Charity screenings and events ===
Mazan and filmmakers stated that using the film to support cancer research and patients in some way was important to them.

Before the Dying to do Letterman world premiere in San Jose at the Cinequest Film Festival, Mazan headlined a comedy show benefiting the Canary Foundation at the San Jose Improv. Actor Michael Rooker joined in promoting the event in a video hosted by both Rooker and Mazan.

At the Kahbang Film Festival, August 9, 2011, Dying to do Letterman played as the closing night film, with all proceeds going to benefit the Champion the Cure Challenge.

On August 11, 2011, a charity screening of Dying to do Letterman was held to benefit Team Lucy, a group put together to support 4-year-old Lucy Weber, a Bloomington, Illinois girl being treated for leukemia. The filmmakers stated the event raised $8000 for the Webers.

Dying to Do Letterman also played as part of the 2012 Gilda's Laughfest, a film festival that promotes healing through comedy.

== Release ==
Dying to Do Letterman had its world premiere in San Jose at the Cinequest Film Festival on Friday, March 4, 2011. It received a theatrical release through the 2011 DocuWeeks program. Its New York premiere was August 26, 2011 at The IFC Center. In Los Angeles, it premiered September 2, 2011 at the Laemmle Sunset 5. Oscilloscope Laboratories acquired the film for distribution on home video platforms in North America. On December 7, 2012, it was released on iTunes, and was named New and Noteworthy along with films including The Dark Knight Rises, Beasts of the Southern Wild, and Brave. On May 13, 2015, the film was released on Hulu.

== Reception ==
In 2011 Dying to Do Letterman played in a variety of film festivals and was reviewed in numerous outlets before it was acquired for distribution by Oscilloscope Laboratories. It had its world premiere at the Cinequest Film Festival, where it won both the Audience Award and Grand Jury Prize for Best Documentary.

=== Film festivals and awards ===
Cinequest Film Festival

- Grand Jury Prize, Best Documentary
- Audience Award, Best Documentary

Cleveland International Film Festival

- Winner, Greg Gund Memorial Standing Up Film Competition

Carmel Art and Film Festival

- Jury Prize, Best Documentary

Los Angeles New Wave International Film Festival

- Honorable Mention, Best Documentary

Just for Laughs Comedy Film Festival

- Honorable Mention, Best Comedy

Kahbang Film Festival

- Audience Award, Best Film

Naples International Film Festival

- Neapolitan Media Award

Heartland Film Festival

- Official Selection

St. Louis Film Festival

- Official Selection

Great American Comedy Festival

- Featured Film

DocuWeeks
Invited to qualify for Academy Award consideration by the International Documentary Association.

=== Audience reaction ===
The filmmakers posted videos showing multiple standing ovations after screenings, and interviewing audience members as they exited theaters.

=== Reviews ===
Cleveland's The Plain Dealer said of Dying to Do Letterman, "... a nimble, uplifting film that celebrates life, love and friendship. Best of all, it's a riot."

Variety wrote "Like its regular-guy subject, the pic proves more endearing than hilarious" and said that scenes in the film provided a "worthy curtain-peeling dimension."

Film School Rejects wrote: "[Dying to do Letterman] does a solid job of weaving elements of Mazan's personal life together with his quest, and it becomes a humorous and occasionally heartbreaking reminder that the journey is more important than the destination. Cliched? Sure, but it works as more than just a simple tale about trying to triumph over cancer. It's inspirational entertainment."

We Are Movie Geeks wrote:

What could've been a grim story becomes a tale of hope and laughter ... This film is an uplifting story that will give you a great insight into the lives of the men and women who grab a mic, deal with rowdy drunks, and follow their hearts no matter what life throws at them.

Steve Rhodes of Internet Reviews called Dying to do Letterman, "a very moving documentary about achieving the American dream." He also noted the audience reaction in his screening:

The movie has shades of ROCKY, as it had our audience rooting for Steve to live long enough and to be determined to be good enough to finally pull off his lifelong ambition. After the ending credits -- which have by far film's funniest bits of all -- had finished rolling, our audience, to a person, was standing up, cheering and applauding loudly.

Comedy publication Splitsider called it, "an exceptionally compelling story, with a twisting and sometimes heartbreaking narrative."

Nearly six years after Mazan's performance, as Letterman neared his final episode of The Late Show, Donald Liebenson writing for The Huffington Post discussed Dying to do Letterman, and called Mazan's Letterman debut, "... one of the most triumphant moments during Dave's 33-year tenure."
