= List of Kenan & Kel characters =

The following is a list of characters from the Nickelodeon sitcom, Kenan & Kel.

== Main ==
=== Kenan Rockmore (Kenan Thompson) ===
Kenan is the oldest child of Roger and Sheryl Rockmore. He is Kyra's older brother and Kel's best friend. Kenan is relatively intelligent, but he hardly does any schoolwork. Instead, he spends his time getting in trouble and plotting schemes (such as transforming the grocery store at which he works into a nightclub, trying to buy a car, or telling everybody that Kel has extrasensory perception). Despite being good-natured, he tends to use his intelligence to frequently annoy his parents and boss. A trait that Kenan shares with Kel is that when someone uttered a nonsense word, the duo would repeat the word confusingly. In one episode, Kenan said the word huckleberry. This prompted Kenan's boss Chris and Kel to repeat the word confusingly. Kel also taught their adopted chimpanzee from the local zoo to do the same thing. His catchphrase is "WHYYYYYY?!" and he usually yells it when Kel does something wrong or he will angrily say, "Kel!". He also passes out when something good or bad happens to him due to being overwhelmed. He is shown to be very physically strong, being able to break an iron handcuff, destroy a block of cement punching it, and even removing a steel bar off a concrete wall with his might. Kenan also has a habit of yelling from across the room.

=== Kel Kimble (Kel Mitchell) ===
Kel is the slightly nutty, dimwitted, and clumsy best friend of Kenan Rockmore. In fact, his impulsive, usually lack of attention, naïvete and strange behavior, make Kel to be accident-prone, being able to create the biggest disaster with the most ordinary things and actions. But despite this, Kel is actually highly intelligent as witnessed by his IQ test score, but this does not show in his everyday life. He loves orange soda (which he professes by talking in the third person: "Who loves orange soda? Kelllll loves orange soda. Is it true? Mm-hmm! I do, I do, I do-ooooh!") and never pays for the soda he drinks at Kenan's place of business, Rigby's. In the episode "Who Loves Orange Soda?", it is revealed that his steady diet for orange soda have caused his insides to be "bright orange". Since Kel's parents (who have never appeared on the show, though mentioned several times) are rich, busy scientists, he often visits and stays in Kenan's home to keep him company. Kel also tries to avoid Kenan's little sister, Kyra, who has a crush on him, but later on in the series, Kel feels more comfortable around Kyra. Kel also manages to get on Kenan's dad's bad side with his clumsy behavior and is always forced to go home. He might resist following Kenan's schemes at first, but ultimately he is included anyway and Kel somehow usually ruins them, although there are a few episodes that end on a high note. Despite being clumsy, Kel is also an incredible painter, an excellent violinist, a rapper and does very well in school (unlike Kenan). He is always wearing a hat during the course of the series. He is scared of pancakes, butterflies, brassieres, flying, ponies, crime, Berlin and monkeys. His catchphrase is "AWWWW, HERE IT GOES!" which he says right before the start of the show, and right at the end of the show. At the end of the first part of a 2-part episode, Kel would say, "AWWW, TO BE CONTINUED...", as the words, "TO BE CONTINUED...", would appear on the screen.

=== Roger Rockmore (Ken Foree) ===
Roger is Kenan and Kyra's father. Roger is a very tall, stern and intimidating father with a big bald head and a deep bass-like voice. Although he is incredibly strict, he is mostly shown to be quite fair to his son. He works at O'Hare Airport as an air traffic controller, and is the only Rockmore who dislikes Kel. This is mostly due to the fact that Kel often makes a sarcastic remark about Roger's baldness and short-tempered attitude and tends to injure him and damage the Rockmore house during his visits. He usually tolerates Kel's presence, due to his friendship with Kenan, but he has been prone to get mad with Kel when he goes too far in his stupid actions. In the episode, Get the Kel Out of Here, Roger bans Kel for good from his house after Kel almost killed him, refusing to listen or forgive him (In the finale of the same episode, Kenan added that the only reason that Roger allows Kel to come back to his house is because he jumped out of the bedroom window after Kel, hit a tree with force, and forgot everything that had happened). Though he's a caring father, Roger has little to no patience with Kenan's schemes and has punished him multiple times as a result of his troublemaking. In addition, Roger usually ends up having to pay for Kenan and Kel's mishaps, such as fixing the Crams' house or repairing the glass display at the jewelry store. He hates spending money and is also grumpy, especially with Kenan's schemes and Kel's accidents. He has also been shown to be a sore-loser because he nearly always wins games.

=== Sheryl Rockmore (Teal Marchande) ===
Sheryl is Kenan and Kyra's mother. Sheryl is kind and caring, however, like her husband Roger, she is just as oblivious as to what schemes Kenan and Kel are up to. She is also much more patient with Kel than her husband, being much more of a listener than a punisher; she'd rather talk out problems with Kenan than punish him, though she has demonstrated her anger in several episodes.

=== Kyra Rockmore (Vanessa Baden) ===
Kyra is Kenan's younger sister. Kyra's biggest mission is telling on her brother Kenan, but she has devoted herself to Kel, having a major crush on him. Kel being aware of Kyra's crush on him, tries to get far away as possible from her. But seeing as this helps Kenan, Kel normally convinces her to help them with their schemes. For most of seasons three and four, Kyra did not appear, even in scenes showing the whole family; she did, however, appear in the series' finale TV movie. She often interrupts Kenan by saying "I was talking to Kel!".

=== Christopher "Chris" Potter (Dan Frischman) ===
Chris is Kenan's boss, friend and the owner of the local grocery store, Rigby's. He lives with his unseen mother (or the other way around), and most of his personal life involves taking care of her as she is an extremely unhealthy woman with an unorthodox lifestyle (attending lumberjack school, for example). Chris is usually Kenan and Kel's mentor and friend on the show, but sometimes he is annoyed by their antics and Kenan's schemes. Chris is dedicated to his store, but becomes annoyed when Kel takes so many things (mostly orange soda) without paying. This once prompted Chris to put a chain lock on the orange soda cooler until Kel began paying for orange soda. However, this only happened once, after which Chris let Kel drink all the orange soda he wants like he always does. He also has frequent nightmares of being chased by a giant rabbit, as well as an irrational phobia of sandwiches. Chris is sometimes caught in the middle of some of Kenan's schemes and may sometimes get hurt. One of his catchphrases is "I have a radio in my car!" Chris usually uses nonsense words, and in earlier seasons, had a quirk of adding the "be" sound before certain words in his sentences, such as telling Kel, "You be-bruised my bananas!", usually leaving Kenan and Kel confused but the quirk was phased out as the series progressed. He also had a nervous twitch, seemingly brought on by stress and anxiety, however this was quickly phased out after the pilot episode. Chris had a mullet during the first season of the series, but beginning in season two, he kept a much shorter hairstyle for the rest of the series.

== Recurring ==
=== Sharla Morrison (Alexis Fields) ===
Sharla was introduced as a new employee at Rigby's at the start of season three. In the show, Chris hired her because he felt Kenan needed more help around the store. A recurring joke in episodes featuring Sharla is her criticizing, mocking, insulting, or just plain annoying Kenan (and sometimes, but not always, Kel), who would do the same back at her. While there, Sharla started to develop a crush on Kenan, and he developed a crush on her, which even led to them dating for a couple episodes. Her teacher, Miss Horn, was portrayed by her real-life older sister, Kim Fields.

=== Marc Cram (Biagio Messina) ===
Marc was introduced in season three as a new next-door neighbor of Kenan. Kenan finds him annoying, while Kel is buddies with him, much to Kenan's greater annoyance. After a few episodes, Kenan becomes friends with him once he got to know him. Marc is characterized as a stereotypical geek. He is an avid collector of watches, and excels at spelling, at times during conversation never mentioning a word by its name, but spelling it out (one such line is, "I am so A-N-G-R-Y!"). His name is also a palindrome. In stark contrast to his "geek" personality, he is not socially awkward, in fact everyone else seems to like Marc with the exception of the principal and many of the other teachers who, like Kenan, seem irritated by his cheerfulness. In addition, Marc always calls Chris "Mr. Potter".

=== Mrs. Quagmire (Doreen Weese) ===
Ethyl Quagmire, an elderly English woman, was introduced in season one as a customer at Rigby's. She provided some light relief to the show during serious events, and also beat up Chris on several occasions. In the season one episode "Diamonds Are For Roger", Chris accused her of stealing a tin of peanuts, prompting her to punch him and call him a weasel. In the season two episode "The Lottery", she entered the store hoping to purchase a lottery ticket, but Chris told her the store was closing; she then held him against the door and again called him a weasel. She was not present in season three as she returned to England to live in the Small Heath area of Birmingham, but returned in season four.

=== Principal Dimly (Hersha Parady) ===
Principal Dimly was the principal at Kenan & Kel's high school, serving as their principal from their freshman year (season one) until their junior year (season three). She appeared in three episodes, all within seasons two and three. The first episode she appeared in was the episode Pair-rental Guidance, where she called Kenan, demanding he and his parents report to her office to discuss his school work, not knowing that she was meeting with actors posing as his parents. The next episode she appeared was The Crush, in she caught Kel cutting class. In her third and final appearance, I.Q. Can Do Better, Kenan drew a funny picture of her which says "Principal Dimwit" which he accidentally leaves in her office following a discussion with her over he and Kel's IQ test scores. This forces the pair to break into her office after-hours to retrieve it, which she catches them doing before punishing them.

=== Dave (Tim Powell) ===
Dave was the surly delivery man at Rigby's. He appeared in several episodes, mainly in the first and second seasons. He was always seen wearing a uniform, and often responded with dry sarcastic barbs to any comment made by Chris. He would normally request that Chris or whoever was present sign his delivery form with his signature line, "Sign my thing".

== Minor ==
=== Brianna (Jill Burgess) ===
Brianna was a girl that Kenan had a crush on during season one. She only appeared in two episodes throughout the series, the first being the episode Doing Things the Hemingway, where Kenan hung a banner declaring his love for her. Her last appearance was in the episode Mo' Sweater Blues, where Kel accidentally ruined her special sweater while Kenan was on a date with her.

=== Miss Horn (Kim Fields) ===
Miss Horn was a substitute teacher and eventual principal at Kenan & Kel's high school. She appeared in two episodes, the first one being the season two episode The Crush, where Kel thought she had a crush on Kenan. She later reappeared in the season four episode The Graduates as the newly-established principal of Capone High School, where she banned Kenan from the graduation ceremony after a senior prank went horribly wrong. She originally opted to give Kenan detention at first, but Kel, as he often did, made thing worse and was the main reason why Kenan was banned from graduation. Kenan and Kel then ruined the graduation ceremony and, although they received their diplomas, both were banned from the school for good. She has a boyfriend named Kevin, who looks similar to Kenan (even Kel thinks so). Her student, Sharla was portrayed by her real-life sister, Alexis Fields.

=== Eric (Mystro Clark) ===
Eric is Kenan and Kyra's older cousin, and Roger and Sheryl's nephew. He was first introduced in the season four episode, The Honeymoon's Over, where Kenan went to his apartment to get some privacy from his parents. His final appearance was in the episode Girl Watchers, where Kenan and Kel were supposed to pick up his girlfriend, Melissa, from the airport. However, they picked up the wrong Melissa, leading to chaos.

=== The Old Lady (Loretta Jean) ===
The Old Lady, who was never named, was a recurring customer at Rigby's, introduced in season three as a replacement for Doreen Weese's character Mrs. Quagmire. She would often come in and ask Kenan ridiculous questions such as "Excuse me young man, is it cold outside?" (when she had just come in from outside) or make him explain simple details about apples that were already displayed. Her catchphrase is "I (pronounced "ah") see!" She is also revealed to be Kel's secret admirer in one episode (after sending him several gifts such as a huge bottle of orange soda).

== Guest stars ==
- Devon Alan
- Karan Ashley
- Bill Bellamy
- Milton Berle
- Michael Berryman
- Dr. Joyce Brothers
- Downtown Julie Brown
- Johnny Brown
- Nick Cannon
- Linda Cardellini
- Robert Costanzo
- Cullen Douglas
- Chris Edgerly
- Bob Eubanks
- Kim Fields
- Arismendy Fondeur
- David Alan Grier
- Ron Harper
- Leland L. Jones
- Kevin Kopelow
- The Lady of Rage
- Kurt Loder
- Whitman Mayo
- Mona Lisa
- Oliver Muirhead
- Hersha Parady
- Paul Parducci
- Chrystee Pharris
- Eve Plumb
- Amy Richards
- Claudette Roche
- Dan Schneider
- Josh Server
- Rondell Sheridan
- Kevin Shinick
- Britney Spears
- Tamia
- TJ Thyne
- Paul Vogt
- Brian Hyder
- Charmin Lee
- Beth Dover
- Max Oritiz Jr.
- Catherine Mangan
- Christopher Michael
- Lisa Ann Orkin
- Paul Parducci
- Mystro Clark
- Crystal Michelle
- Frederick Lawrence
- Regina Randolph
- Malachi Pearson
- John Walsh
- Sallie Glaner
- John Roarke
- Ryan C. Clark
- Chad Bonsack
- Cindy Ferda
- Harry Burney
- Rosa Benson

== See also ==
- Kenan & Kel
- Two Heads Are Better Than None
