= Caged (TV series) =

American reality television series

- Starring: Wes Branch; Tony "Primetime" Kelley; Daniel Payne; Matt "Danger" Schnell
- Country of origin: United States
- Original language: English
- No. of seasons: 1
- No. of episodes: 10

Production
- Executive producers: Amy Bailey; Joke Fincioen; Biagio Messina; Dave Sirulnick
- Running time: 60 minutes
- Production company: Joke Productions

Original release
- Network: MTV
- Release: January 9 – March 12, 2012

Caged is an American reality television series which aired on MTV. It focuses on a group of young up and coming mixed martial arts fighters in small town Minden, Louisiana. The series premiered on January 9, 2012 on MTV and ran for 10 episodes on its first and only season.

== Cast ==
- Wes Branch (Amateur 3-2)
- Tony "Primetime" Kelley (7-2)
- Daniel Payne (Amateur 6-3)
- Matt "Danger" Schnell (9-2)

== Episodes ==
No.	Title	Original release date	U.S. viewers (millions)
1	"Caged pilot"	January 9, 2012	0.62
Three different mixed-martial arts fighters from disparate backgrounds try to make names for themselves in Minden, Louisiana. Wes and Danger win their fights while Daniel loses his.
2	"Backlash"	January 16, 2012	N/A
An injury threatens Wes' next fight; Danger beats another opponent. Daniel loses his fight.
3	"Retribution"	January 23, 2012	N/A
Daniel wins his fight on the night of the anniversary of the death of his ex-girlfriend, a Miss Minden winner. Wes still can't fight due to his injury and starts becoming increasingly annoyed by Red, who he feels incessantly nags him. Danger wins his fight while battling his own inner demons about whether or not he can date a woman.
4	"The conflicted"	January 30, 2012	N/A
John Wesley trains for his comeback fight. Red finds pictures of Wes having sex with other women on his computer and is upset by the pictures, which confuses Wes. Daniel's mother forces him to break up with Britani because she does not approve of their relationship. Donny, the owner of Karate Mafia, propositions Danger and he reluctantly accepts, leading to doubts among his peers who are not sure if he can take it. The temptation for Daniel proves to be too overwhelming and he agrees to Donny's advances. John Wesley wins his first fight in three years but panics and ends up in the hospital. Danger also wins his fight.
5	"Birthday fight"	February 6, 2012	N/A
Daniel and Britani confront their relationship since his mother disapproved of it and agree to remain friends. While training, Daniel discovers that he has shingles and has to cancel his fight. His mother breaks the news to the fight promoter as he can not bring himself to make the call himself. Wes and Red fight over Jax's birthday party and he has difficulty training for his upcoming fight as he is saddled with work and financial obligations. Danger becomes increasingly upset that Lauren keeps showing up at the gym, as he prefers only the company of men while training. We also see his conflict regarding his feelings towards his sister and mother. The gang travels to New Orleans to watch Wes fight. Wes struggles to make weight. He then loses his fight by decision on his son's birthday.
6	"Life takes its toll"	February 13, 2012	N/A
Daniel fights a rival from his hometown. Danger starts to get depressed about his most recent feelings towards his mother.
7	"Life is short"	February 20, 2012	N/A
Danger tries to lead Karate Mafia, but no one really pays attention to him. He attempts to get signed by local sponsors, but no one is interested at all, having difficulty understanding him. Daniel and Dane spend a night out together as he confesses that he has difficulty relating to women, which he blames on his ADD. Wes drinks before his fight and does not train. When he attempts to drop 14 pounds in 1 day to make weight by running and spending extended periods of time in a sauna, he starts to feel ill and is hospitalized. John Wesley wins his fight.
8	"Second chances"	February 27, 2012	N/A
Daniel goes to the beauty salon to get his highlights in his hair done, where the girls tell him he needs to start dating. He asks out a waitress he meets and takes her on a date to a maze in a cornfield, which bores her. Danger trains with a group of professional fighters which pushes his limits. Tony trains for his first fight since a bar fight left him with an orbital fracture. Wes and Red start sleeping together again. Tony and Danger are the only ones to fight in this episode and both win.
9	"Second chances"	March 5, 2012	N/A
Danger visits his dad in Florida and the fighters form a new training team.
10	"Finale and the End of the Road"	March 12, 2012	N/A
Tito Ortiz goes to watch the fights in Louisiana looking to discover new and previously unknown fighters. Daniel takes a girl on a date and bonds with her when she makes him feels validated for his ADD and OCDs, as she accepts his condition as her brother suffers from the same afflictions. Tony wins his fight while Daniel loses his. Wesley quits drinking and starts training for the first time in his life, which leads him to choke out his opponent fairly easily, being in by far the best shape of his life. Danger wins his fight against a tough adversary by using an arm bar.

== Impact of the show ==
Although the show is typically panned by MMA fans, it catapulted "Danger" (Matt Schnell) to the professional ranks after being discovered by Tito Ortiz. In November 2012, he won his professional debut against fellow newcomer Ryan Hollis by a split decision, and now fights in the UFC.

Tony Kelley made his professional debut in April 2013 winning by first round TKO against Kody Thrasher.

== Critical reception ==
From Ken Tucker of Entertainment Weekly:

Caged wisely substituted action for talk: We watched a lot of punching, kicking, and pounding... As a pop-documentary show, Caged follows the traditional arc of an old boxing movie: Fighters who have little else in their lives except their fists try to become champs to gain fame, some money if not fortune, and — a distant dream — a career. The Ultimate Fighter this ain’t. But that’s okay, because the first episode did a good job.

From Lucas High of TVGEEKARMY:

I realize as I'm writing this that some readers will accuse me of blasphemy for what I'm about to say, but here it goes anyway: there are moments in MTV's new Mixed Martial Arts-based reality show Caged that remind me of my beloved Friday Night Lights. I know, I know, it's crazy to compare a reality show that has only aired a single episode to arguably the greatest television show of all time, and yet throughout the premiere I kept doing it.

From Stephen Boyle of Sports Illustrated:

The show’s characters are its strongest feature. The wide variety of compelling backstories have to overlap in a town that makes Friday Night Lights’ fictional Dillon look big. Minden, La., the town featured in "Caged," doesn’t even have a bar that shows UFC fights so Branch and his buddies watched them in Paynes’ garage during their high school days. None of the shows characters are perfect protagonists. They’re all real characters that can be easily related to. Branch doesn’t have the time or the money to train at a gym. Instead he finds himself rolling around in backyards late at night after he gets off work. It’s easy to see why he’d throw back a couple Bud Lights while he breaks down his film. ....Caged definitely doesn’t follow the obviously stale recipe of The Ultimate Fighter. Cut scenes of bars and BBQ restaurants replace the same repeated gym poster introductions of the UFC’s reality show. While The Ultimate Fighter searches for the next Forrest Griffin, Caged gives you a real-life Tim Riggins."

From Josh Nason of Bloody Elbow:

If you're into teen reality drama shows with a modicum of sports, this show is for you. Otherwise, MMA fans can skip the series which debuts Monday on MTV at 10 PM EST... Essentially, the show is no different than any teen reality drama on MTV... Perhaps this will be a real launching pad for some of the talent on the show, but there isn't much here of substance.

From Eric Ball of The Bleacher Report:

MTV Caged: Cable Network Reaches New Low with Grotesque Fighting Show... MTV introduced a MMA style reality show on Monday night that had little to do with the sport... It’s really just depressing more than anything else... So it’s a show about fighting with words that’s masked as a show about fighting with your fists... If that’s your cup of tea, tune in Monday nights at 10:00 p.m. EST. If you just want to watch compelling fights in the ring, stick to Spike, HDNET and PPV.
