= Stephanie Birkitt =

American television personality and lawyer

- Born: Stephanie Anne Birkitt; January 7, 1975 (age 51); Plymouth, New Hampshire
- Education: Wake Forest University, Yeshiva University
- Occupation: Attorney
- Known for: Former assistant to David Letterman on the Late Show with David Letterman

Stephanie Anne Birkitt (born January 7, 1975) is an American attorney and former assistant to David Letterman on the Late Show with David Letterman. Although Birkitt frequently appeared on the program as a character named "Vicki", Letterman often called her by various other nicknames, such as "Smitty", "Kitty", "Monty", "Gunther", and "Dutch".

== Early life and education ==
Birkitt was born in Plymouth, New Hampshire. Her mother is an assistant principal and her father is a dentist. She graduated from Wake Forest University in Winston-Salem, North Carolina, in 1997, with a bachelor's degree in history and a minor in communications.

She graduated from Yeshiva University's Benjamin N. Cardozo School of Law in June 2008 with a juris doctor. In February 2009, Birkitt passed the New York State and Connecticut bar examinations. Birkitt has been a licensed attorney in California since 2011. She also has had an active Connecticut lawyer license since 2009.

== Late Show career ==
Birkitt's career at CBS started before she graduated from college, when she worked as an intern for CBS News, 48 Hours, and the Late Show in early 1996. After graduation she became a member of the CBS page program and worked briefly as an associate producer at 48 Hours on segments for correspondent Erin Moriarty. Deciding she was not "much of a news hound", she applied for a job as an office worker for David Letterman, helping to handle his charities and his Indy car racing team.

Her spring internship led to Birkitt's first appearance on the Late Show, on May 24, 1996. Her next appearance was over four years later, on December 26, 2000, when Letterman called her in her office during the show. After that appearance, Letterman began to call her regularly as an on-air feature of the show, beginning in January 2001. Birkitt said, "He started talking to me more, and we developed a rapport."

By 2002, Birkitt began to be featured on the Late Show as a character outside of her role as Letterman's assistant. She appeared during the "CBS Mailbag" segment numerous times, sometimes donning costumes that related to a specific ongoing festival or event. She interviewed Survivor castoffs, asking them "Did you see or touch any monkeys?", much to Letterman's feigned displeasure. In 2002, she was named No. 21 in USA Today's "Pop Candy's 100 People of the Year!" list. As herself, she gave on-air reports from the sites of the Winter Olympics in 2002 and 2006. In all, she made more than 250 appearances on the program between 1996 and 2008. By the time of her final appearances on the show, in late 2008, she had completed her law school education.

In addition to her appearances on the Late Show with David Letterman, Birkitt co-hosted The Tony Mendez Show, a spin-off program with Tony Mendez (also known as "The Cue Card Boy") that was hosted on the Late Show website.

Birkitt described her relationship with Letterman in an interview with the Fort Worth Star-Telegram in 2004. In the article, titled "Letterman Aide is Dave's Main Tease", Birkitt said, "[Letterman is] just playful. We play catch sometimes in the office, and we all go to screenings together. We eat food together, we sit around and watch TV together and goof on people. And he teases me in real life, too, but I give it back a lot more in real life."

In a statement released on October 7, 2009, Letterman's production company, Worldwide Pants, announced that Birkitt had been placed on a "paid leave of absence" from the Late Show.

== Affair with Letterman ==
On October 1, 2009, Letterman announced on air that he had been the victim of an extortion attempt in which an alleged blackmailer—since identified by police as CBS television producer Joe Halderman—threatened to reveal that Letterman had engaged in sexual affairs with multiple female employees. Letterman admitted on television that the allegation was true, but did not reveal the names of, or any identifying information about, the female employees. Soon afterward, the extortionist was identified by media as a former lover of Birkitt, and anonymous sources alleged that Birkitt and Letterman also had a sexual relationship.

Birkitt reportedly was neither aware of nor involved in the blackmail attempt. According to CBS News, she and Halderman lived together in Halderman's home in Norwalk, Connecticut, until August 2009, when she reportedly moved out; she was also romantically linked to Letterman during the same time. The New York Post reported on October 6 that Birkitt had an affair with Letterman, which continued during her relationship with Halderman. Copies of entries in Birkitt's diary, as well as emails between her and Letterman, were reportedly the basis of the blackmail evidence Halderman allegedly placed in Letterman's car. Halderman was sentenced to six months in prison for the attempted extortion.
