= Steve Mazan =

American screenwriter

Steve Mazan (born May 22, 1970) is an American stand-up comedian, television writer, and author. Mazan won an Emmy Award for his writing on The Ellen DeGeneres Show, performed comedy on The Late Show with David Letterman and is known for his style of "clean and clever comedy."

In 2005, Mazan was diagnosed with inoperable metastatic neuroendocrine cancer and told he may only have five years to live. Mazan decided to spend the time he had left pursuing his dream of performing comedy on David Letterman's show.

His journey was the subject of the feature-length documentary Dying to do Letterman. The film was invited by the International Documentary Association to qualify for Academy Award consideration. Mazan was later contracted by HCI Books to write an autobiography based on his experiences, titled Dying to do Letterman: Turning Someday Into Today.

Mazan also presented a TedX speech detailing his experiences battling cancer to chase his dreams.

Donald Liebenson, writing for The Huffington Post, called Mazan's beating cancer to appear on Letterman, "...one of the most triumphant moments during Dave's 33-year tenure."
