= Joe Halderman =

American convicted felon (born 1957)

Robert Joel Halderman (born October 1957) is an American news writer and director who was a former producer at CBS News. Halderman was found guilty of attempted extortion of talk show host David Letterman.

== Career ==
Born in Dayton, Ohio, Halderman began his journalistic career in 1980 at CNN in New York City. He was hired as a sound man and then became a cameraman, a writer and an assignment editor. In 1982, he went to work for CBS News, first on the national assignment desk and then, as a producer on the CBS Morning Show with Diane Sawyer and Bill Kurtis. In 1986, he produced the CBS specials AIDS Hits Home and 48 Hours on Crack Street. He became a foreign reporter who travelled to more than 70 countries, and was responsible for war reportage from nations such as Iraq, Afghanistan, Lebanon, and Bosnia.

He was stationed in London for 12 years, throughout the 1990s, from where he reported on events in the Soviet Union and, later, Russia. In 1992, he wrote and produced the CBS special Somalia: A Country Is Dying. Halderman worked for CBS Sports during the Winter Olympic Games in Albertville '92, Lillehammer '94 and Nagano '98.

During the 2000s, Halderman worked on domestic shows for CBS, He produced the show Flashpoint in 2007, and from 2005 to 2009, he was also a producer of the CBS true crime journalism series 48 Hours, including episodes such as Out of the Shadows (2005), about the serial killer Dennis Rader, also known as the BTK Killer, and Virginia Tech: Anatomy of a Rampage (2007), about the school shooting and mass murder known as the Virginia Tech massacre which took place at Virginia Polytechnic Institute and State University. Halderman wrote and produced more than 50 episodes of 48 Hours during his tenure there. In September 2006 he produced Five Years Later: How Safe Are We?, a look at US security since the September 11 attacks on the World Trade Center and The Pentagon.

Halderman's work at CBS News won an Alfred I. duPont-Columbia University Award for broadcast journalism and eight Emmy Awards. He also received an Academy Award nomination for the 2006 film Beslan: Three Days in September which was narrated by Julia Roberts. The film premiered at the Tribeca Film Festival in New York and aired on Showtime. The film about the Beslan school siege, which Halderman wrote, directed and produced, combined guerilla footage and interviews with family members, soldiers, local politicians, school officials, and survivors to describe the hostage-taking and massacre of hundreds of people at a children's school by Chechen rebels in North Ossetia, Russia.

In July 2010, when he was serving his sentence at Rikers Island, Halderman was nominated for an Emmy as a producer of a 48 Hours Mystery segment regarding Amanda Knox. The Emmy was won instead by a 60 Minutes segment on the war in Pakistan.

Halderman was the Senior Producer for On the Case with Paula Zahn from 2011 to 2013.

As of November 2017, he is associated with James O'Keefe and the Project Veritas organization.

== Personal life ==
Halderman married Patty Montet in 1990 and the couple had two children. They divorced in 2004.

According to CBS News, Halderman and Stephanie Birkitt lived together in Halderman's Norwalk, Connecticut, home until August 2009, when she reportedly moved out. She was also romantically linked to David Letterman during the same time.

== David Letterman blackmail attempt ==
In October 2009, Halderman was accused of attempting to blackmail talk show host David Letterman for $2 million. According to Letterman, who described the incident on his television show on October 1, 2009, someone had threatened to expose Letterman's sexual affairs with female staff employees in the form of a screenplay and a book if he was not paid off. Halderman was arrested when he attempted to cash a phony $2 million check Letterman's lawyer gave him.

At the time of his arrest, Halderman was a producer of the CBS true crime journalism series 48 Hours. He was indicted by a Manhattan grand jury and pleaded not guilty to a charge of attempted grand larceny in criminal court on October 2, 2009. If convicted, Halderman faced punishment of five to fifteen years. Bail was set at $200,000, which Halderman posted.

Halderman had at one time lived with one of Letterman's assistants, Stephanie Birkitt. Halderman read Birkitt's diaries without her permission, learning of her affair with Letterman, which ended in 2003. As a member of the CBS page program, Birkitt worked for both Letterman's show and for 48 Hours before becoming a staff employee for Letterman.

On March 9, 2010, Halderman pleaded guilty to attempted grand larceny in the second degree and received a six-month jail sentence, to be followed by five years' probation and 1,000 hours of community service.

Halderman was released from Rikers Island on September 2, 2010, after serving four months of his six-month sentence.
