= David Letterman: Looking for Fun =

1981 HBO television special starring David Letterman

- Genre: Comedy
- Written by: Helen Melman
- Directed by: Thomas V. Grasso
- Presented by: David Letterman
- Country of origin: United States
- Original language: English

Production
- Executive producer: Buddy Morra
- Producer: Merrill Markoe
- Running time: 28 minutes
- Production companies: Recreational Poultry Productions in association with Rollins, Joffe, Morra, & Brezner

Original release
- Network: HBO
- Release: June 12, 1981

David Letterman: Looking for Fun is an American comedy television special starring David Letterman. It premiered on HBO on June 12, 1981, between the cancellation of Letterman's daytime program The David Letterman Show and the premiere of Late Night with David Letterman.

The special follows Letterman as he travels around the Los Angeles area searching for recreational activities and interviewing members of the public. Segments include visits to a video arcade, the Hollywood Wax Museum and restaurants, as well as a tour of comedian George Miller's apartment. Merrill Markoe appears as Letterman's date during two segments.

Markoe produced the special, which was directed by Thomas V. Grasso and written by Helen Melman. Buddy Morra served as executive producer. The special received several repeat broadcasts on HBO during June and July 1981.
