= Chad Gervich =

American dramatist

Chad Gervich is a published author, television writer and producer, and playwright.

Gervich has produced and written for shows such After Lately, Dog With a Blog, Cupcake Wars, and Wipeout. He has written Small Screen, Big Picture: A Writers Guide to the TV Business, "How to Manage Your Agent: A Writer's Guide to Hollywood Representation", and "Psych's Guide to Crime Fighting for the Totally Unqualified".
