= Joke Fincioen =

American TV producer and filmmaker

Joke Fincioen is a Belgian-born United States–based television producer, filmmaker, director, and showrunner. She pronounces her first name /jōk/. Her television credits include the VH1 reality TV acting competition series Scream Queens, the MTV documentary series Caged, The CW social experiment Beauty and the Geek, and the MTV True Life Presents documentary feature Secrets, Lies, and Sex.

Her filmmaking credits include the theatrically released, feature-length documentary Dying to do Letterman, which was invited by the International Documentary Association to qualify for Academy Award consideration. She has produced and contributed to over one-hundred hours of TV and film.

Born in Belgium, she moved to the United States in 1994. She is married to Biagio Messina, her husband and business partner. They own and run Joke Productions, a production company. They blog and podcast about the entertainment industry.
