= Small Screen, Big Picture =

Small Screen, Big Picture: A Writer's Guide to the TV Business
- Author: Chad Gervich
- Language: English
- Subject: Television, Television Writing
- Publisher: Three Rivers Press, Penguin Random House
- Publication date: November 25, 2008
- ISBN: 978-0307395313

Small Screen, Big Picture: A Writer's Guide to the TV Business is a nonfiction book about the entertainment business written by Chad Gervich. It covers the process of entering the TV writing profession and earning a living as a TV writer. It was published November 25, 2008, by Three Rivers Press, and is currently published by Penguin Random House.

== Overview ==
The book explores the ways in which television networks, production companies, and Hollywood studios intersect. It then demonstrates how those entities work together to guide a writer's creative process. Other topics include modern television business models, new media outlets, and potential paths to employment as a TV writer.

== Reception ==
Booklist said of the book, "This could just be the most informative book ever written about the television industry." TV by the Numbers stated, "If you want to break into television as a writer, this is definitely a book for you." Advance praise was written for the book by Tom Kapinos, creator of the television series Californication, who said:

The world of TV writing is much like the hell that is high school, only the nerds are nerdier, the jocks are jockier and all the mean girls want to eat your young. With the help of Chad’s book and breezy writing, one will be able to navigate the treacherous waters and dimly lit corridors and emerge overpaid and well fed, just like the rest of us.
