= Robert Schimmel =

American comedian (1950–2010)

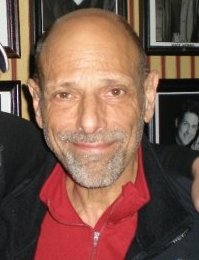
- Schimmel in 2009
- Born: Robert George Schimmel; January 16, 1950; New York City, U.S.
- Died: September 3, 2010 (aged 60); Scottsdale, Arizona, U.S.
- Spouses: Vicki Schimmel (m. 1977; div. 2000); Melissa Schimmel (m. 2000; div. 2009)
- Children: 6

Robert George Schimmel (January 16, 1950 – September 3, 2010) was an American stand-up comedian who was known for his blue comedy. While the extremely profane nature of his act limited his commercial appeal, he had a reputation as a "comic's comic" due to his relentless touring, comedy albums and frequent appearances on HBO and The Howard Stern Show. Schimmel is number 76 on the 2004 program Comedy Central Presents: 100 Greatest Stand-Ups of All Time.

== Early life and career ==
Schimmel was born in the Bronx, New York City, the son of Betty and Otto Schimmel, Jewish survivors of the Holocaust. He was voted class clown during high school and was in the United States Air Force for one year during the Vietnam War era. In 1980 he was living in Scottsdale, Arizona, where he was working as a stereo salesman. His career began when, at the urging of his sister, he performed at a comedy club's open-mic night. A club owner in Los Angeles offered to make him a regular, but when Schimmel moved there he found that the club had burned down.

Undaunted, and with some help from Rodney Dangerfield, who invited him to perform on his HBO Young Comedians Special, Schimmel began making a name for himself. He wrote material for In Living Color and for comedians such as Yakov Smirnoff and Jimmie Walker.

In 2000 Schimmel had developed and completed a TV pilot for a show that would bear his name for the FOX network, with Brie Larson and Vicki Davis as his two daughters. The show was put on hiatus when Schimmel became ill from cancer and eventually cancelled. The opening scene is available on YouTube.

== Comedic style ==
Schimmel cited Lenny Bruce as his all-time comedy hero. Schimmel incorporated many aspects of his personal life into his act, such as sex with his wife and masturbation, and even his cancer and the death of his son. In one signature bit, Schimmel joked about making obscene suggestions to a lady from the Make-a-Wish Foundation. His act was described as raunchy and sexually explicit, which he claimed as the reason he never appeared on network television. He said his inappropriate comments on Late Night with Conan O'Brien and The Hollywood Squares caused him to be removed, though he later returned to O'Brien's show. However, his edgy style made him a hit on The Howard Stern Show.

== Personal life ==
Schimmel married his first wife, Vicki, in 1977, and they had four children together. Their son Derek died from cancer at the age of 11. Schimmel later divorced and remarried, having two sons with his second wife, Melissa.

As an adult, Schimmel suffered from cancer and had one of his testicles removed.

Schimmel had a complicated relationship with his first wife, Vicki. "We got married, then got the marriage annulled, then got remarried, got divorced then remarried," and then their son Derek became ill from cancer and died. They eventually divorced permanently in 2000 when Schimmel became romantically involved with his second wife Melissa.

In 1998, Schimmel suffered a heart attack. In June 2000, he was diagnosed with non-Hodgkin's lymphoma. His treatments included chemotherapy and required long stays in the hospital. Schimmel detailed this experience, in a humorous light, in his book Cancer on Five Dollars a Day* (*chemo not included): How Humor Got Me Through the Toughest Journey of My Life.

Schimmel was arrested in Calabasas, California on May 2, 2009, as a result of an alleged confrontation between himself and his wife Melissa. The district attorney eventually declined to press charges, citing insufficient evidence. On May 8, 2009, Melissa Schimmel filed for divorce, citing irreconcilable differences. Schimmel claimed, during an interview with Howard Stern, that his wife had cheated on him with their neighbor, although he admitted he had no solid proof. Schimmel also stated that he was bankrupt due to some of the actions that Melissa had taken with his money.

During an interview on The Howard Stern Show on January 28, 2010, Schimmel announced that he developed cirrhosis as a result of a hepatitis C infection from a blood transfusion that he received while in the Air Force. His cirrhosis had progressed to the point that he was working to be added to the waiting list for a donated liver.

== Death ==
On August 26, 2010, in Scottsdale, Arizona, Schimmel was a passenger in a car driven by his 19-year-old daughter Aliyah. After veering off the road to avoid hitting another vehicle, the car flipped onto its side and came to a stop in the shoulder of the Loop 101 freeway. Schimmel was hospitalized at John C. Lincoln Hospital (North Phoenix) in serious condition, while Aliyah was hospitalized in stable condition. Schimmel's son Jacob, who was also in the vehicle at the time of accident, was uninjured. On September 3, 2010, Schimmel died of his injuries.

He is interred at the Paradise Memorial Gardens in Scottsdale, Arizona.

== Works ==
Albums

- Comes Clean, Warner Bros. Records (1996)
- If You Buy this CD, I Can Get this Car, Warner Bros. Records (1998)
- Unprotected, Warner Bros. Records (1999)
- The Early Years, Murder Inc. Records (2002)
- Reserection, Murder Inc. Records (2003)

Videos

- Unprotected, HBO (1999)
- Old School: Hardcore In The Big Apple/Guilty As Charged, Murder Inc. Records (2006)
- Life Since Then, Image Entertainment (2009)

Book

- Cancer on Five Dollars a Day* (*chemo not included): How Humor Got Me Through the Toughest Journey of My Life. Da Capo Press (2008)

TV

- Robert Schimmel: Guilty as Charged, Showtime, TV special (1994, August)
- Schimmel, Fox (2000, unaired)
