= List of hairdressers =

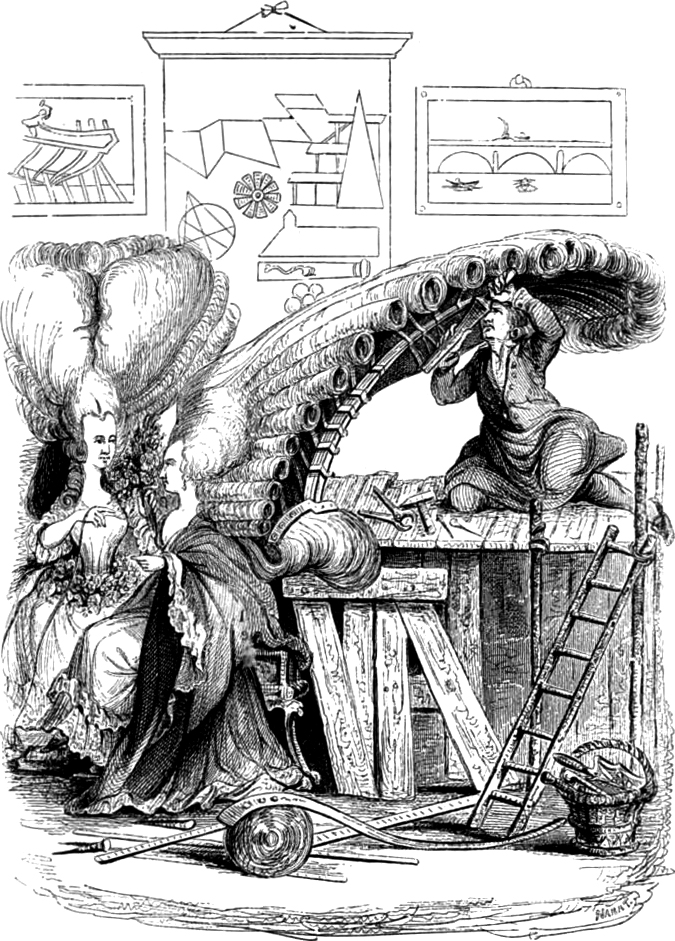
A caricature of the Académie de Coiffure founded by Legros de Rumigny

This is a list of notable hairdressers. "Hairdresser" is a term referring to anyone whose occupation is to cut or style hair in order to change or maintain a person's image. This is achieved using a combination of hair coloring, haircutting, and hair texturing techniques. Most hairdressers are professionally licensed as either a barber or a cosmetologist.

== Pre-20th century ==
- Monsieur Champagne (fl. 1663) – French hairdresser, subject of the comic play Champagne le coiffeur.
- Madame Martin (fl. 1671) – hairdresser to the court of Louis XIV.
- Legros de Rumigny (1710–1770) – French court hairdresser
- Jean Joseph Beaulard (1770s) – French hairdresser
- Léonard (c. 1751–1820) – hairdresser to the French court.
- Marie Laveau (1801–1881) – French hairdresser
- Marie Catharina Malm (1805–1888) – Swedish hairdresser, one of the first wellknown professional hairdressers of her country.
- Félix Escalier (1815–) – French hairdresser; personal hairdresser och Empress Eugenie
- Christiana Carteaux Bannister (1819–1902) – French hairdresser
- Eliza Potter (1820–1893) – American hairdresser
- Marcel Grateau (1852–1936) – inventor of the Marcel wave in the 1870s, although it was most popular in the 1920s.
- Franz Ströher (1854–1936) – German hairdresser, company founder of Wella

== Salon hairdressers ==
=== 1900–1960 ===
- Alexandre de Paris (1922–2008) – clients included the Duchess of Windsor and Daisy Fellowes
- Antoine de Paris (1884–1976) – Polish, began in Paris, then in New York from 1924. Introduced a short bob cut in 1909, then the shingle cut in the 1920s.
- Kenneth (1927–2013) – American, one of the foremost New York hairdressers since the 1950s, and sometimes described as the world's first celebrity hairdresser.
- Charlie Miller (1994–2025), Scottish celebrity hairdresser.
- Karl Nessler (1872–1951) – German-born, worked around Europe before moving to the United States. Patented the permanent wave.
- Teasy Weasy Raymond OBE (1911–1992) – considered Britain's first celebrity hairdresser. His clients included Diana Dors

=== From 1960 – present ===
- Franca Afegbua – Nigerian hairdresser and senator.
- James Brown – best known for his work with Kate Moss
- Lino Carbosiero MBE London – clients include David Cameron, Catherine Zeta-Jones, Adele Adkins and Melania Trump.
- Nicky Clarke OBE London – clients include David Bowie, Elizabeth Hurley, and Diana, Princess of Wales.
- Anthony Dickey – American celebrity hairstylist known for his expertise in natural hair textures
- Errol Douglas MBE London – clients include Diana Ross, Naomi Campbell, Melanie Griffith.
- Frédéric Fekkai – French hairstylist, particularly famous during the 1990s for his notoriously high prices.
- Daniel Galvin OBE – London Twiggy
- Joshua Galvin – London Judy Garland
- Ted Gibson – New York
- Leonard of Mayfair – leading London hairdresser from the 1960s to 1980s, training many other cutters.
- Denise McAdam RVM – hairdresser to the current British royal family.
- Denis McFadden – Sydney – Founder/CEO "Just Cuts"
- Michel Mercier – French-Israeli hairdresser, his clients include Brigitte Bardot and Isabel Adjani.
- Benoît Poirier d'Ambreville (born 1970) – salon owner and television consultant
- Vidal Sassoon CBE (1928–2012) – London and later Los Angeles – clients included Mia Farrow
- Trevor Sorbie MBE – London
- Lee Stafford – leading British hairdresser from 1998, his clients include Victoria Beckham.
- Nicolas Jurnjack (1994–present) – Leading session stylist, hairdresser in the Fashion & Beauty Industry
- Tabatha Coffey – Australian hairdresser and television personality
- Steven Jastrabek – American hairdresser known for olympic athlete clientele Kerry Weiland, Erika Lawler, Clarissa Chun, Caitlin Cahow, Gigi Marvin, Julie Chu and Ben Askren.
- Patricia Lamah – Guinean hairdresser

== Film and television stylists ==
- Deborah Holmes Dobson – Emmy Award-winning hairstylist (Dr. Quinn, Medicine Woman)
- Sydney Guilaroff – worked for MGM on numerous movies and his clients included Greta Garbo, Grace Kelly and Joan Crawford.
- Gail Ryan, American. Won Academy Award in 2011 for How the Grinch Stole Christmas!. Clients include Benicio del Toro, Sean Penn, Naomi Watts, and Dustin Hoffman.

== See also ==
- List of hairstyles
