= Benoît Poirier d'Ambreville =

French stylist

Benoît Poirier d'Ambreville (born 1970) is a French stylist/colorist, entrepreneur, television celebrity, and former model. He was the runway consultant in the 2012 season of Chile's Canal 13's No Basta con ser Bella and is the image consultant on TVN's upcoming television program 21 días de lujo. He is the owner of the Atelier Benoît Poirier d'Ambreville in Santiago, Chile.

== Life and career ==
D'Ambreville was born in Lorient, France, and raised in Nice. At the age of 15, he began working at the Marotte Salon, a chain of salons on the French Riviera. The owner, Andre Marotte, arranged for D'Ambreville to study at the L'Oréal Institute in Paris, focusing on hair coloring. While there, he learned the balayage technique, a hair coloring method that produces natural-looking highlights. Afterward, he returned to Nice, where he worked for three years.

Seeking a more "progressive environment", D'Ambreville moved to London and began working at the Trevor Sorbie Salon. At this point, he transitioned from a classic to an avant-garde style.

In London, D'Ambreville was approached by a photographer who recommended he try modelling, which resulted in a five-year career as a model. As a model, he worked in Paris, Milan and New York City. After two years in London, he moved to New York for three more years of modelling.

Upon the conclusion of his modeling career at 27, D'Ambreville resumed his career as a stylist in New York. He worked in the upscale salons of Warren Tricomie, Kim Lépine, NY and others and became a freelance platform artist and educator for L'Oreal Professional USA. In New York, D'Ambreville taught the balayage hair coloring technique for L'Oreal. D'Ambreville incorporated this technique into his signature "Urban Edginess" style.

In 2001, D'Ambreville returned to Europe, settling in Monte Carlo, Monaco, where he founded the salon "Beauty & Beyond", which catered to Monte Carlo's elite. Three years later he moved back to New York, where he worked with the Roy Teeluck Hair Salon, and was a stylist for celebrities during the 2005 to 2008 Academy Award ceremonies.

D'Ambreville moved to Santiago, Chile in 2008 to join part of his family residing there. In 2010, he opened Atelier Benoît Poirier d'Ambreville, one of the first luxury hair salons in the country.

D'Ambreville has written for BC, Infashion, Parati, and I Love Chile magazines and has contributed to Paula magazine.

D'Ambreville was a regular figure in season 1 of No Basta con Ser Bella, a Canal 13 television show. He served as the program's runway consultant, teaching a group of Miss Chile hopefuls how to comport themselves on the catwalk. He is the image consultant on TVN's upcoming program "21 días de lujo".

As of 2013, D'Ambreville is single.
