= Louis Alexandre Raimon =

French hairdresser (1922–2008)

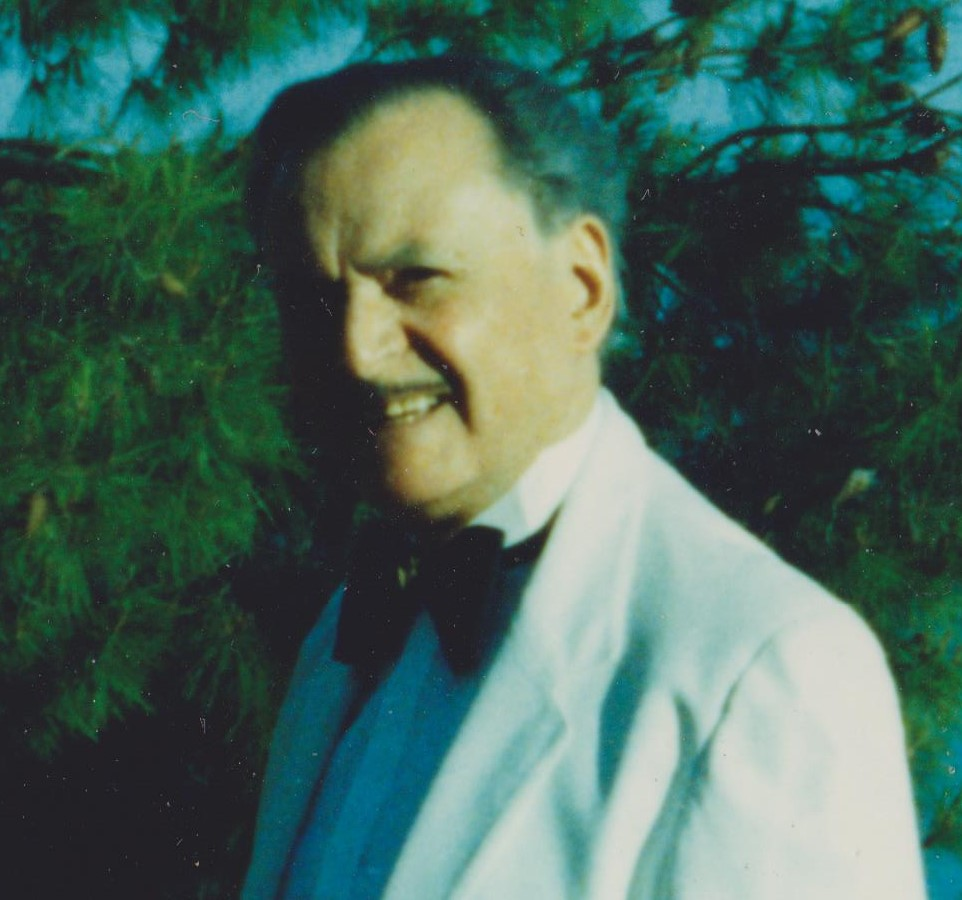
Alexandre de Paris

Louis Alexandre Raimon (6 September 1922 – 12 January 2008), better known as Alexandre de Paris, was a famous French hairdresser ("maître coiffeur"). He was responsible for creating Elizabeth Taylor's coiffure in the 1963 Hollywood epic Cleopatra. He also styled Greta Garbo, Audrey Hepburn and Lauren Bacall, among others. He was nicknamed the "Prince de la coiffure", "d'Artagnan de la coiffure", "Sphinx de la coiffure", and "Figaro". His signature chignons (knot or a coil of hair arranged in the back of the head) and his flamboyant style made him famous, setting fashions in hairstyling for decades.

== Biography ==
Alexandre was born on 6 September 1922 in Saint-Tropez, France. In 1938, he began working as an apprentice at a hair salon in Cannes (French Riviera). He soon became the head apprentice ("premier garçon") of his mentor Antoine de Paris. In this salon he met Andrée Banaudi, to whom he remained married until his death.

In 1946, he became famous for his masterpiece, the coiffure of Begum Om Habibeh Aga Khan (Yvette Labrousse) for her wedding with Aga Khan III. In that year he originated the chignon as art form, with different twists on the classic style. Later, for a 1961 dinner given at the Chateau de Versailles by Général de Gaulle in honour of the U.S. President John F. Kennedy, Alexandre would put diamonds in Jackie Kennedy's chignon.

He worked for over 40 years with the masters of French haute couture: Coco Chanel, Yves Saint-Laurent, Hubert de Givenchy, Christian Dior, Karl Lagerfeld, Madame Grès, Pierre Balmain, Gianfranco Ferré, Jean-Paul Gaultier and Thierry Mugler. Like them, he became a well-known symbol of French elegance.

In 1952, he opened a salon jointly with the Carita sisters. Five years later, in 1957, he opened his own salon on the Rue du Faubourg Saint Honoré in Paris. Jean Cocteau, his friend, designed his logo, nicknaming him "le Sphinx de la Coiffure". Later, in 1982, he opened a second salon, Avenue Matignon, in Paris.

His clientele included Princess Beatrix of the Netherlands, the Duchess of Windsor (who had introduced him to the international aristocracy as he was starting out), Isabelle, comtesse de Paris, Jacqueline de Ribes, Aimée de Heeren, Farah Diba, Hope Portocarrero, Gloria Guinness, Dolores Guinness, Jacqueline Kennedy Onassis, Queen Sirikit of Thailand, Frederica of Hanover, Princess Grace of Monaco, and also actresses such as Audrey Hepburn, Lauren Bacall, Liza Minnelli, Shirley MacLaine, Greta Garbo, Maria Callas, Sophia Loren, María Félix, Banu Alkan, Arletty, Michèle Morgan and Romy Schneider and Amel Taourit.

In 1963, he created Elizabeth Taylor's hairdo for the film Cleopatra. He was very close to Taylor, whom he considered a personal friend. He designed her coiffures for many movies in which she starred, as well as for her wedding with actor Richard Burton. For her, he also created the famous layered "artichoke" cut. In 1964, he created all of the hair designs for Tippi Hedren in her role as a compulsive thief in Marnie, directed by Alfred Hitchcock.

He was also the hairdresser of King Hassan II and the Queen of Jordan and was invited by the Shah of Iran Mohammad Reza Pahlavi to dress the hair of most prestigious guest of the lavish celebration of Persepolis in 1971.

He was the president of the Organization Mondiale de la Coiffure from 1978 until 1993.

At the exhibition "The Grace Kelly Years", in the summer of 2007 at the Grimaldi Forum in Monaco, Frédéric Mitterrand gave a tribute to Alexandre's long-lasting work for Princess Grace of Monaco by displaying a selection of original drawings, pictures and letters. The pieces are property of the Grimaldi family.

He died on 12 January 2008 at the age of 85 with his wife and two children by his side.

== Decorations ==
- Two Oscars de la Mode in 1963 and 1969
- Honorary Dé d'or of the Haute Couture (1994)
- Chevalier de la Légion d'honneur
- Chevalier dans l'Ordre national du Mérite
- Chevalier des Arts et Lettres
- Médaille de Vermeil de la Ville de Paris
- Chevalier de l'ordre de Saint-Charles (Monaco)

== Sources ==
- Carnet du Jour. Le Figaro. 12 January 2008.
- Décès du maître Alexandre de Paris, inventeur de la "haute coiffure". AFP. 12 January 2008.
- Stéphane Bern, Alexandre de Paris, figaro des princesses. Le Figaro. 14 January 2008.
- The Grace Kelly years exhibition in the Monaco Revue.
- The Grace Kelly years exhibition.
- BBC report on Alexandre's death
- UPI story
- Nice article in the WWD by Jennifer Weil
- Nice one by John Lichfield in The Independent
- "John Lichfield again..." The New Zealand Herald.
- Obituary in The Times, 22 January 2008
