= Alain Pichon =

French hairstylist and television personality

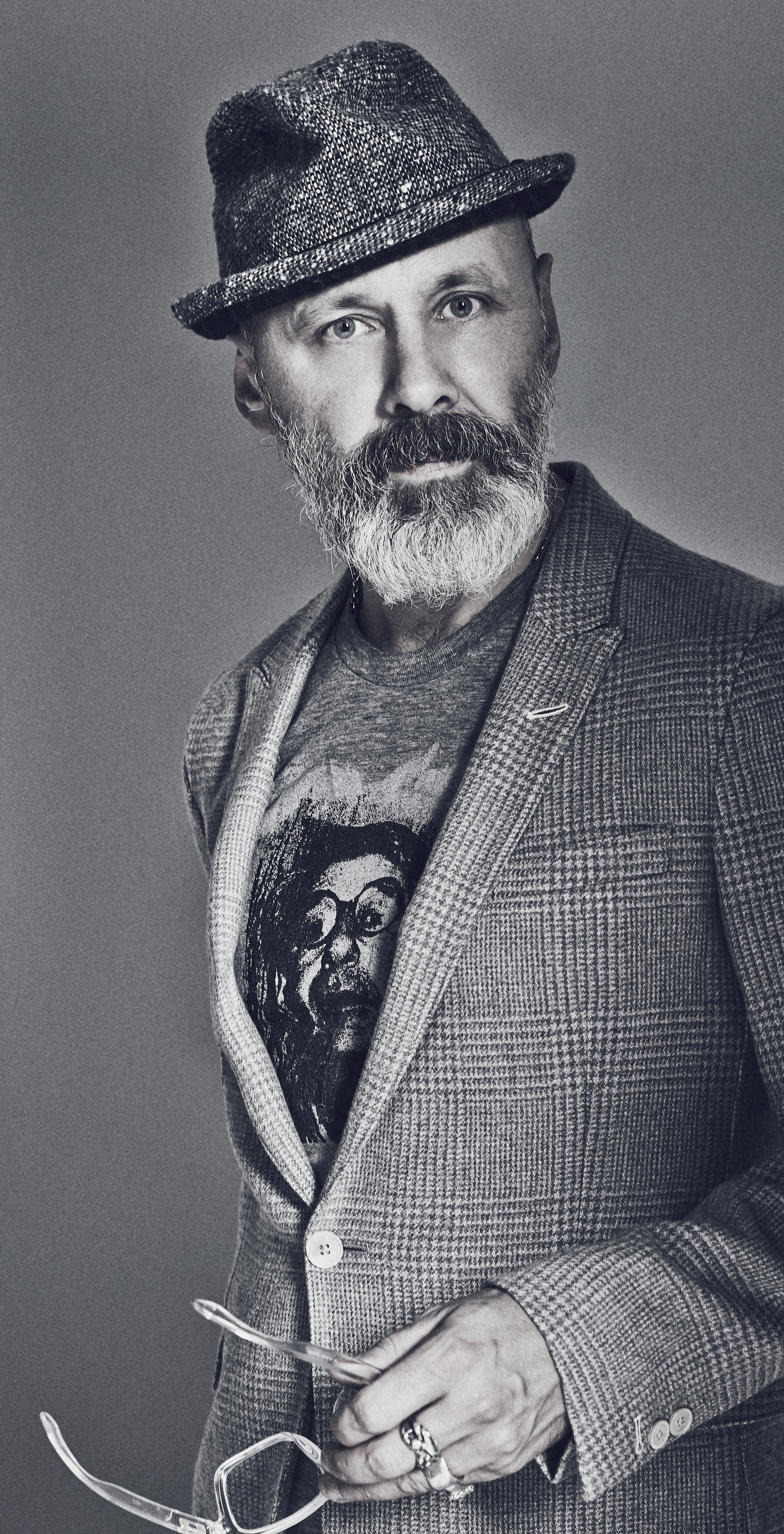
- Pichon in 2013
- Born: 19 April 1966 (age 59); Nantes, France
- Occupation(s): Celebrity Fashion Hairstylist, Television Personality
- Known for: Hair TV Series
- Website: Official website

Alain Pichon (born 19 April 1966) is a French hairstylist, and television personality. His participation as a judge on the Hair TV Series made him a British household name in 2014. The first series was broadcast in early 2014 on BBC Three, and achieved the highest viewing figures for the TV channel. The show aired in Australia on the ABC2 channel later in 2014. A second series is confirmed on BBC Two in 2015. He is well known as the hairdresser to the worldwide celebrity David Beckham amongst many others.

== Career ==
As a fourth-generation hairdresser, international session stylist Alain Pichon's passion for hair runs in his blood. He first started training in his local French salon, which had links to the Vidal Sassoon Academy. By the age of 23, Alain was in London working for Toni & Guy where he soon became Artistic Director and travelled the world educating at shows and seminars.

Alain started his freelance career as a hairstylist at 28, working together with designers' collections on fashion shows, with renowned photographers on well-known magazines and as a consultant for international product companies and feature films.

Alain is represented by the global management agency, CLM

== Clientele ==
He has collaborated on advertising campaigns, such as Prada, Calvin Klein, Dior, YSL, Donna Karan, Hugo Boss and for many catwalk shows in New York, Paris, London and Milan.

Over the years Alain has worked with Madonna, Claudia Schiffer, Kylie Minogue, Sienna Miller, Britney Spears, Scarlett Johansson, Trudie Styler, Prince William and Prince Harry.

== Editorial ==
Alain works with many of the world's top magazines, including several editions of Vogue Magazine, Another Magazine, W Magazine, Numéro, Dazed & Confused (magazine).

== Television ==
In 2014 Pichon had his TV debut as a judge on the BBC Three Hair TV Series, alongside Denise McAdam and Steve Jones (presenter). The show netted 785,000 viewers on BBC Three and was most watched show on the channel, followed by EastEnders and Family Guy.

== Personal life ==
Growing up in France with three older sisters, Alain was surrounded with passion for fashion, magazines and beauty. His father, his grandfather and his great grandfather before him were barbers so it seemed only natural to Alain to follow in the family tradition.

Alain has been married to Eva Charlotta since 1993. They have 3 children, Carmen Adora 21, Viktor 15 and Alfons 5
