= James Brown (hair stylist) =

Irish hair stylist

- Born: 1969 (age 56–57); County Galway, Ireland
- Occupations: Celebrity; Style Director; Hair stylist

James Brown (born 1969) is an Irish hair stylist, fashion editor, art director and farmer.

== Life and career ==
Brown was born in County Galway, Ireland and grew up near Croydon, London in the 1970s. His introduction to hairdressing came early when he landed his first job in a Croydon salon at the age of 15 and where he first encountered schoolgirl Kate Moss.

Moving into London, Brown completed his apprenticeship at Zoo in Covent Garden, before moving onto salon 'Brinks and Huck' where he began as a session hairdresser for style magazines i-D and The Face. Brown is a vintage clothes collector.

Aged 24, he re-located to New York to pursue his freelance career. In 2005 he made London his permanent base once more to focus on building his own hair care brand James Brown London. In 2009, James starred in his own TV shows, ‘James Brown’s Supermodel Salon’ created by E4 that revolved around his life and his celebrity friends. The Great British Hairdresser was another TV show with Jo Elvin editor of Glamour and Abbey Clancy, which attracted almost a million viewers each week in the UK. It has since been aired around the world in countries including Australia, Sweden and The Netherlands. James Brown also appeared on Supermodel Salon in 2009 and on Stephen Fry’s 100 Best Gadgets in 2011.

=== Bafta Incident ===
At the 2011 Bafta Television Awards ceremony in London, at the Grosvenor House Hotel, Brown was involved in a racial abuse incident, referring to Ben Douglas as a 'n*****r' multiple times. Following the incident, Brown issued an apology: "I’d like to make a public apology to Mr Douglas, to his friends and to Bafta for my offensive and stupid comments. The simple truth is that I had drunk far too much on the evening and my behaviour was totally unacceptable." Ben Douglas is the director of a children's theatre.

Donations

Supermodel Kate Moss gave Brown her vintage 1930s gown, reportedly damaged by Courtney Love during Moss's attendance at the Victoria & Albert Museum Golden Age Of Couture Gala in 2007. The dress was auctioned off to raise money for Cancer Research UK.

=== Television ===
Brown directed a short movie starring Abbey Clancy. For a Vauxhall commercial, Abbey Clancy plays an indie band front woman, wearing only a pair of Marks & Spencer pants.

Year	Show	Role	Notes
2005	James Brown's Supermodel Salon	Self	Documentary
2011	Great British Hairdresser	Judge	Epi 1 - Epi 10
2011	Stephen Fry’s 100 Best Gadgets	Self	

== See also ==
- List of celebrity hairdressers
