= Hot roots =

Hair condition

Hot roots is a term used by hair stylists to describe the condition when, after applying an artificial pigment to the hair, the roots (the section of the hair shafts that is closest to the scalp) are noticeably ‘warmer’ in color (more red/orange) than the lengths and ends of the hair. If a darker shade of natural hair color is being lightened with a permanent hair color, the heat produced by the scalp can cause the hair nearest it to lighten more and/or become warmer than the ends of the hair.
