= Antoine de Paris =

Polish hairdresser (1884–1976)

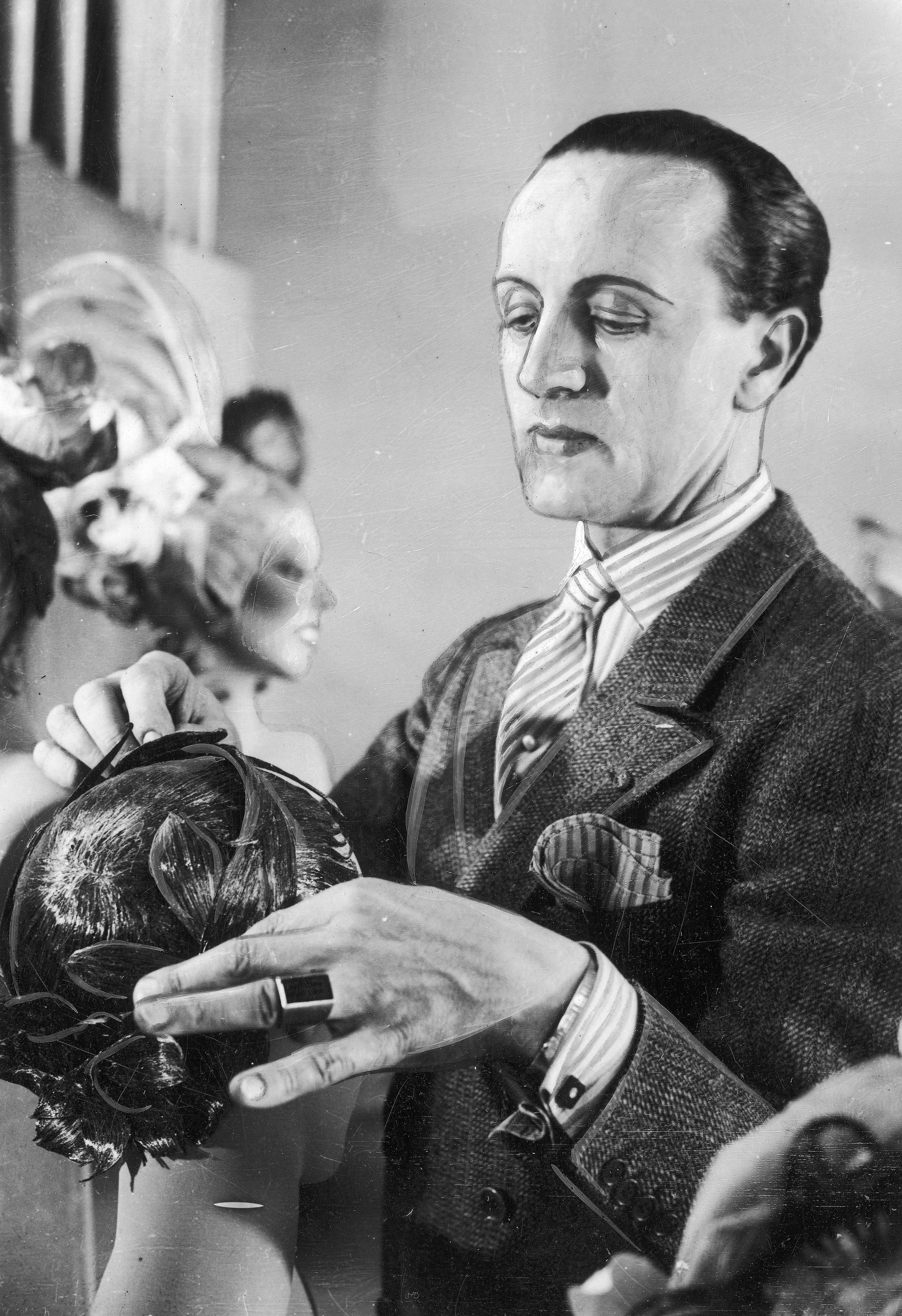
- Antoine at work in 1934
- Born: Antoni Cierplikowski; 24 December 1884; Sieradz, Poland
- Died: 5 July 1976 (aged 91); Sieradz, Poland
- Citizenship: Poland; France
- Occupation: Hairdresser

Antoni Cierplikowski (Polish pronunciation: [anˈtɔɲi t͡ɕɛrplʲiˈkɔfskʲi]; 24 December 1884 – 5 July 1976) was a Polish hairdresser who became the world's first celebrity hairdresser when he opened the salon Antoine de Paris in Paris and became known as Monsieur Antoine. Among his clients were world-famous female personalities like Coco Chanel, Queen Marie of Romania, Sarah Bernhardt, Greta Garbo, Eleanor Roosevelt, and Brigitte Bardot.

== Early life ==
Cierplikowski was born in Sieradz, Poland, and learnt hairdressing by working for his uncle in Łódź. In December 1901, he moved to Paris, France. He married Berthe Astier on 24 January 1909 in London, England, where they were both learning English.

== Career ==
After moving to Paris, Cierplikowski worked in the salon at Galeries Lafayette. During the summer season, he worked in Deauville, following the high society of Paris who vacationed there. In 1904, he created a stylish coiffure for Lily de Moure when she lost her fashionable hat. Her appearance without a hat on the arm of a royal prince caused a sensation; other fashionable ladies soon decided to have their hair styled by Cierplikowski.

In 1909, Cierplikowski started a fashion for a short bob cut which was inspired by Joan of Arc. In the 1920s, he introduced the shingle cut which became popular with daring young women — the Bloomsbury set and flappers. In 1924, he dyed his dog's hair blue. This blue hair was taken up by the first professional interior designer, Lady Elsie De Wolfe Mendl, which started a new fad. He created the “garconne” hairstyle for the likes of Coco Chanel, Josephine Baker, and Edith Piaf. His creations were rumoured to cost up to 500 francs - more than £1,000 in today's money. In the 1930s, he introduced blonde highlights and a style of upswept hair.

In 1924, Cierplikowski opened a salon at Saks Fifth Avenue in New York which became the most fashionable hair salon in America. Other famous hairdressers, including Sydney Guilaroff, established their reputations there. The peak of Antoine's career was the coronation of King George VI and Queen Elizabeth in 1937, when he supervised 400 coiffures in one night.

== Later life ==
After the death of his wife in 1973, Cierplikowski returned to his birthplace, Sieradz, where he died in 1976 at the age of 91.
