= Hair (TV series) =

- Opening title card for 2014 series
- Genre: Entertainment; Factual
- Directed by: James Morgan
- Presented by: Steve Jones (2014); Katherine Ryan (2015)
- Judges: Denise McAdam; Alain Pichon
- Narrated by: Jason Done (2015)
- Composers: Tom Howe; Mike Reed
- Country of origin: United Kingdom
- Original language: English
- No. of series: 2
- No. of episodes: 14 (list of episodes)

Production
- Executive producer: Clare Sillery
- Producer: Ceri Jones
- Running time: 60 minutes (2014); 30 minutes (2015)
- Production company: BBC Television

Original release
- Network: BBC Three (2014); BBC Two (2015)
- Release: 25 February 2014 – 4 August 2015

Hair is a British reality television series to find Britain's best amateur hair stylist that was first broadcast on BBC Three on 25 February 2014. The first series was presented by Steve Jones, whilst the second series is fronted by Katherine Ryan. The judges are Denise McAdam and Alain Pichon. On 30 October 2014, it was revealed that Hair had been renewed for a second series and promoted from BBC Three to BBC Two. The second and final series comprises eight half-hour episodes and began on 13 July 2015.

== Production ==
Hair was commissioned by Zai Bennett and Emma Willis and was produced by BBC Television.

== Transmissions ==
Series	Episodes	Originally released		
Series	Episodes	First released	Last released	Network
1	6	25 February 2014	1 April 2014	BBC Three
2	8	13 July 2015	4 August 2015	BBC Two

== Episode list ==
=== Series 1 (2014) ===
No.	Title	Original release date	UK viewers
1	"Episode 1"	25 February 2014	880,000
2	"Episode 2"	4 March 2014	910,000
3	"Episode 3"	11 March 2014	910,000
4	"Episode 4"	18 March 2014	965,000
5	"Episode 5"	25 March 2014	823,000
6	"Episode 6"	1 April 2014	1,089,000

=== Series 2 (2015) ===
No.	Title	Original release date	UK viewers
7	"Episode 1"	13 July 2015	N/A
8	"Episode 2"	14 July 2015	N/A
9	"Episode 3"	21 July 2015	1,030,000
10	"Episode 4"	22 July 2015	890,000
11	"Episode 5"	27 July 2015	< 870,000
12	"Episode 6"	28 July 2015	870,000
13	"Episode 7"	3 August 2015	< 930,000
14	"Episode 8"	4 August 2015	1,110,000

== Series ==
=== Series 1 (2014) ===
Eight contestants participated in the first series of Hair.

Contestants of the first series Hair

Contestant	Age	Outcome
Amy Tombling	22	Eliminated 1st
Ebuni Ajiduah	24	Eliminated 2nd
Laura Hollowell	25	Eliminated 3rd
Annie Davies	24	Eliminated 4th
Kobi Kirby	16	Eliminated 5th
Katie Crompton	30	Runner-up
Dominika Kasperowicz	29	Runner-up
Marvin Francis	25	Winner

=== Series 2 (2015) ===
Ten contestants participated in the second and final series of Hair.

Contestant	Age	Outcome
Daniel Cryne	31	Eliminated 1st
Jaime Cura	38	Eliminated 2nd
Lesley White	58	Eliminated 3rd
Sarah Bloor	42	Eliminated 4th
Rebecca Uzzaman	30	Eliminated 5th
Meggan George	21	Eliminated 6th
Kellie Henry	28	Eliminated 7th
Marlene Abuah	30	Runner-up
Maryia Yasianetskaya	29	Runner-up
Philip Hunt	33	Winner
