= Sydney Guilaroff =

American motion picture hair stylist (1907–1997)

- Born: November 2, 1907; London, England
- Died: May 28, 1997 (aged 89); Beverly Hills, California, U.S.A.
- Occupation: Motion picture hair stylist
- Years active: 1921–1987
- Relatives: Olga (sister), Vera (sister); Jon (adopted son), Eugene (adopted son), ? (adopted son)

Sydney Guilaroff (November 2, 1907 – May 28, 1997) was a British-American hair stylist during Hollywood's Golden Age, and the first to receive on-screen credit in films. He worked for more than 40 years at Metro Goldwyn Mayer studios, on more than 1,000 films. He was instrumental in creating many of the hairstyles that became signature looks for film stars.

== Early life ==
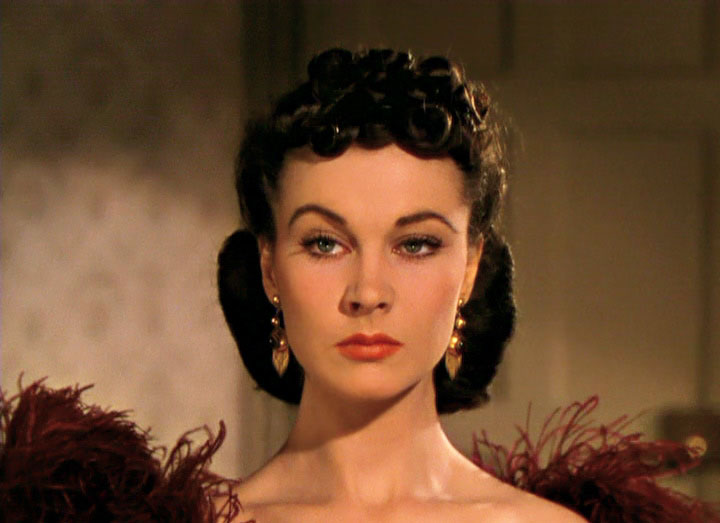
One of many hair styles designed for Vivien Leigh as Scarlett O'Hara in Gone With the Wind (1939)

Guilaroff was born in London, England to Eugene Abraham Guilaroff and Annie Guilaroff née Snitkin, Russian Jewish immigrants who later settled in Canada. They lived in both the cities of Winnipeg and Montreal. His sisters, Olga and Vera, became prominent in the theater. At age 14, Guilaroff left Canada for New York City and found work in the stockroom of Gimbels department store. An on-the-job accident required him to leave, and at times his financial situation forced him to sleep on benches in Central Park.

His fortunes changed when he was hired as a beautician's assistant. His menial responsibilities included sweeping the floor of a hair salon. The owner recognized his energy and enterprise, and mentored him in the hairdressing trade. By age 16, Guilaroff was so proficient a hair stylist that he had established a considerable clientele. However, his blossoming career was interrupted by a diagnosis of tuberculosis, which required his return to Canada. He recovered and returned to New York to continue his profession. During this period, he was reputed to have created silent screen star Louise Brooks' signature bob. He also devised the hair looks for actresses Corinne Griffith and Miriam Hopkins. He subsequently found a position at Antoine de Paris’s, one of the city's most exclusive salons, where he was known as Mr. Sydney.

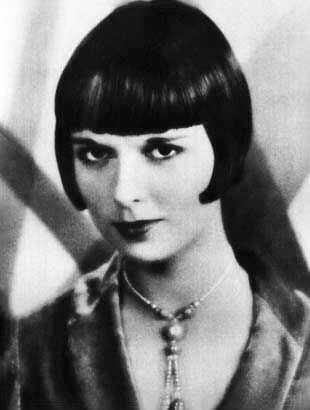
Louise Brooks, 1930, in her iconic bob hair style conceived for her by Guilaroff

== Career with Metro Goldwyn Mayer ==
Guilaroff's rise to prominence as a hairdresser to the stars was championed by actress Joan Crawford, who brought him to Hollywood and MGM, where he was chief hair stylist from 1934 to the late 1970s.

At a time when a star's appearance played an important role in studio marketing, Guilaroff created distinctive looks that influenced popular hairstyle trends among fans.

“…[Guilaroff] gave Claudette Colbert her bangs, made Lucille Ball a redhead, gave Judy Garland her Wizard of Oz braids, and cut, curled, coiffed and cosseted virtually every other MGM star in his 40-year reign as Hollywood’s most creative and celebrated hairdresser.”

Guilaroff considered his most demanding work to have been the 1938 film Marie Antoinette, for which 2,000 court wigs were required and an additional 3,000 wigs for the extra players. He was uncredited as hair stylist for Vivien Leigh in Gone With the Wind (1939).

Grace Kelly chose Guilaroff to style her hair for her 1956 wedding to Prince Rainier of Monaco.

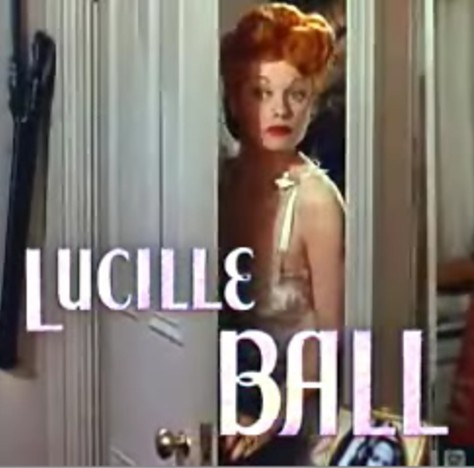
Guilaroff tinted Lucille Ball's hair flame red for Du Barry Was a Lady (MGM, 1943). She was so pleased, she kept it that way for the rest of her life.

When Lena Horne filmed her introductions to her scenes in the MGM musical documentary That's Entertainment! III (1994), she requested that Guilaroff come out of retirement to style her hair, some 50 years after he first styled it in Cabin in the Sky (1943).

== Notable clients ==
Over his career, Guilaroff's clients included Elizabeth Taylor, Judy Garland, Lana Turner, Greta Garbo, Lena Horne, Greer Garson, Debbie Reynolds, Ann-Margret, Barbara Stanwyck, Cyd Charisse, Marilyn Monroe, Katharine Hepburn, Ingrid Bergman, Hedy Lamarr, Kathryn Grayson, Liza Minnelli, Clare Booth Luce, Ginger Rogers, Geraldine Page, Libby Holman, and Jane Fonda. He was the stylist of choice for such male stars as Cary Grant, Clark Gable, Fred Astaire, James Stewart, Spencer Tracy and Frank Sinatra.

== Awards ==
Guilaroff won a Primetime Emmy Award for Outstanding Achievement in Hairstyling for a Miniseries or Special for The Two Mrs. Grenvilles (1987) starring Ann-Margret and Claudette Colbert.

== Personal life ==
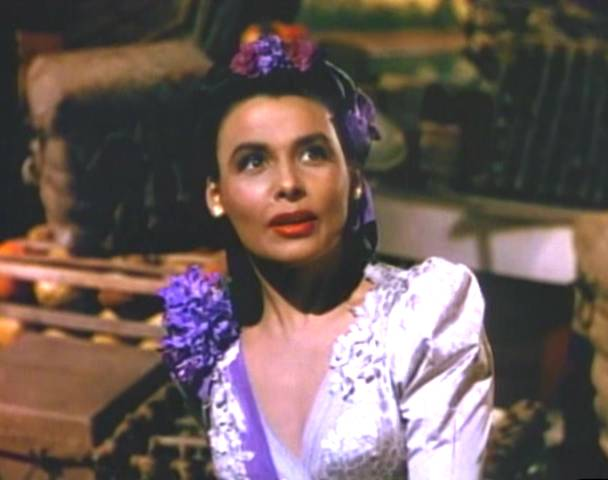
Hair design for Lena Horne as Julie LaVerne in a mini-production of Show Boat in Till the Clouds Roll By (1946)

Guilaroff never married. In 1938, he became the first single man in the United States to adopt a son, whom he named Jon in honor of Joan Crawford. The state of California opposed the adoption and tried to prevent it, but Guilaroff prevailed. He subsequently adopted another son, named Eugene, and some years later a third, who had been a former employee.

In his memoir Crowning Glories, Guilaroff claimed he had romantic affairs with Greta Garbo and Ava Gardner. Esther Williams in her autobiography and Scotty Bowers in his memoir asserted that Sydney Guilaroff had romantic affairs with Bowers. Bowers also stated to have set him up with his partner Edwin B. Willis.

== Death ==
Guilaroff died in Beverly Hills, California on May 28, 1997, at age 89.
