= Rose Evansky =

British hairdresser

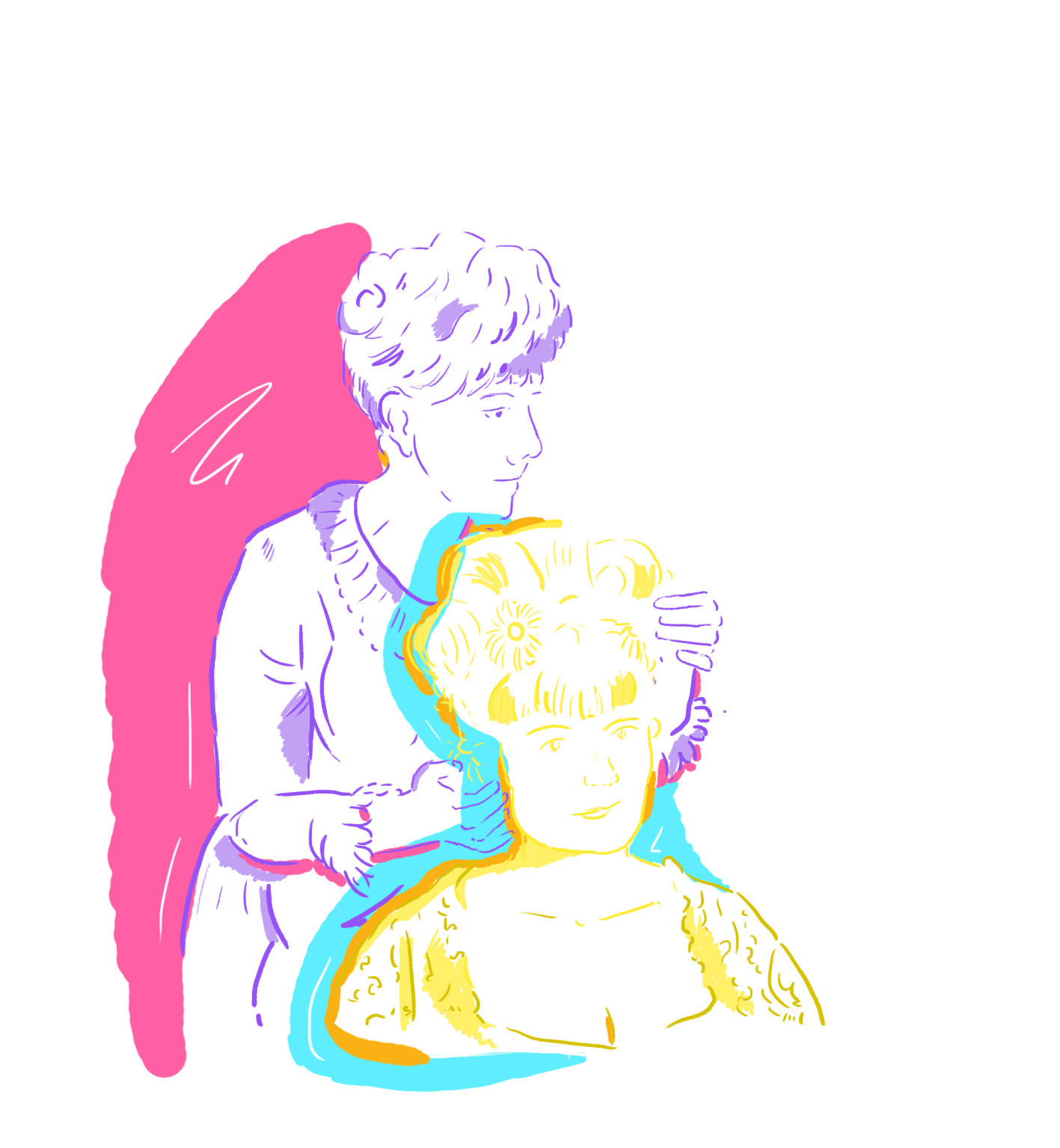
Rose-Evansky

Rose Evansky, née Rose Lerner (30 May 1922 – 21 November 2016) was a British hairdresser notable for introducing the "blow dry" or "blow wave" technique of hairstyling.

== Early life ==
Evansky was born in Worms, Germany on 30 May 1922, to a Jewish family who were immigrants from Poland. Her father was sent to Dachau concentration camp in 1938, and Rose was one of the last children to be sent to Britain from Germany on the Kindertransport trains.

== Hairstyling technique ==
In 1962, from her salon window, Evansky noticed a barber using a powerful new hand-held dryer—together with a hairbrush—to smooth a man's hair. A little while later she was spotted trying it in her salon (on a Mrs. Hay) by Clare Rendlesham who set about marketing this blow-wave which worked on straight hair as well. Within a year, all the leading stylists in Mayfair, London offered it. using a hand-held blowdryer on her Mayfair clients "to create a soft, natural look". She also trained the notable hairdresser, Leonard of Mayfair. This was quite a step up from her early beginnings as an apprentice working for Adolf Cohen of Whitechapel Road, known as the "professor" of the hairdressing trade, who also trained Vidal Sassoon.

After the war the couple opened their first hair salon together in 1947 in Hendon, north London. Within six years, they were able to move up the career ladder, renting premises in North Audley Street, Mayfair. But when she moved into blowdrying, her husband accused her of "having gone mad," since they had just purchased 20 new hood dryers and he was not prepared to throw them out. A few were kept for the older clients and those who still requested high-dressed, lacquered styles. This was one element of the strain on their marriage, and they later divorced.

== Personal life ==
In 1942 Evansky married her first husband, fellow hairdresser Albert Evansky.

In 1965, Evansky married Denis Cannan whom she had met through clients. Within ten years she left the hairdressing profession and moved with her husband to retire in the Sussex countryside.

They returned to London for a while, then retired to Hove, East Sussex. After she was noticed at the launch of a book by another 1960s hairdresser, and interviewed by radio and fashion press, she wrote a memoir in 2013, In Paris We Sang (2013).

Reaching Mayfair had been an achievement. Rose's family fled antisemitism in Poland after the first world war to settle in Germany, but under Nazi rule Rose's father, Max Lerner, was sent to Dachau in 1938. Her brother Heine who was always known as Harry in England (he refused to acknowledge his German name), escaped on the kindertransport at the age of 13 and went around all the relatives to arrange sponsorship, managing first to get their father Max to England and then his older sister Rose and their mother. She was 16 and spoke only Yiddish and German when she boarded one of the last kindertransport trains to safety in the UK.
