= Joshua Galvin =

Joshua Galvin (1938 – 2011) was an English hairdresser and educator.

He became one of Vidal Sassoon’s top London stylists in the swinging 60s, and was Judy Garland’s personal hairdresser in New York.

He had five training academies in London and Essex, earning the unofficial title, "the father of modern hairdressing training," and sat on the council of the Fellowship for British Hairdressing.

Galvin was awarded an honorary fellowship by the University of the Arts London in 2007. His younger brother, Daniel Galvin, is also a prominent hair stylist.
