= Michel Mercier (hairdresser) =

French-Israeli hairdresser and entrepreneur

- מישל מרסייה
- Born: July 28, 1961 (age 64); Châteaudun, France
- Occupation: Hairdresser
- Website: http://www.michelmercier.com/

Michel Mercier (Hebrew: מישל מרסייה; born July 28, 1961) is a French-Israeli hairdresser, entrepreneur and businessman.

== Background ==
Mercier was born in Châteaudun, France. He grew up in Bordeaux and Provence and immigrated to Israel in 1985. In high school he studied graphics and drafting. In 1981 he returned to France from Israel to study hairdressing at the Vidal Sassoon academy in Paris and later began working at French hair salon Claude Maxime.

His son is actor Tom Mercier.

== Career ==
At age 23, Mercier opened his first hair salon on Dizengoff Street in Tel Aviv. Over the years, Mercier founded four more branches. Two of the branches are still operating. In 1998, he founded a hairstyling school in Tel Aviv. Mercier worked alongside Wella as a presenter at a variety of seminars around the globe.

In 2002, Mercier founded the ColoRight system. The idea behind the system was to enable stylists and hair color consumers to achieve precise color outcomes, while virtually eliminating mishaps and hair damage. In December 2014, Israeli entrepreneur Benny Landa bought the company and sold it to L'Oréal.

In 2006, Mercier began to market a line of hair products he developed in collaboration with laboratories and engineering teams. He required that none of the products be tested on animals. Mercier is the developer of several patented products, including a hair detangling brush and S.O.S Color, which is a hair-coloring device for coloring roots.

Over the years, Mercier worked with Hollywood celebrities including Brigitte Bardot and Isabel Adjani and presented at hair shows and seminars. Today he works with L’Oréal, Wella and Procter & Gamble as a global product developer.
