= Gail Ryan =

American film and television hairdresser

Gail Rowell-Ryan (born 11 January 1939) is a film and television hairdresser.

== Biography ==
Gail Rowell-Ryan was born in Cincinnati, Ohio in 1939. She worked from 1974 to 2021. She has worked in films such as How the Grinch Stole Christmas, Taken, The Hunted, and Wrongfully Accused. She has worked with celebrities such as Benicio Del Toro, Naomi Watts, Dustin Hoffman, Sean Penn, Leslie Nielsen, Ray Liotta, and Nick Nolte.

Rowell-Ryan married makeup artist Robert Ryan on March 4, 1989. The couple were divorced on January 16, 2002.

== Awards and nominations ==
Year	Award	Category	Work	Result	Ref.
1994	Primetime Emmy Award	Outstanding Individual Achievement in Hairstyling for a Miniseries or a Special	The 66th Annual Academy Awards	Nominated	
1999	Primetime Emmy Award	Outstanding Hairstyling for a Miniseries, Movie or a Special	The Rat Pack	Nominated	
1999	Daytime Emmy Award	Outstanding Hairstyling	Donny & Marie	Nominated	
2000	Academy Award	Best Makeup and Hairstyling	How the Grinch Stole Christmas	Won	
2000	BAFTA Award	Best Make Up and Hair	How the Grinch Stole Christmas	Won	
2000	Saturn Award	Best Make-up	How the Grinch Stole Christmas	Won	
2000	Daytime Emmy Award	Outstanding Achievement in Makeup	Donny & Marie	Nominated	
2001	Make-Up Artists & Hair Stylists Guild Award	Best Innovative Hair Styling	How the Grinch Stole Christmas	Won	
2010	Primetime Emmy Award	Outstanding Hairstyling for a Multi-Camera Series or Special	The 82nd Annual Academy Awards	Nominated	
2013	Primetime Emmy Award	Outstanding Hairstyling for a Multi-Camera Series or Special	Dancing with the Stars	Nominated	
2014	Make-Up Artists & Hair Stylists Guild Award	Hair Stylists Lifetime Achievement Award	—	Won	
2014	Primetime Emmy Award	Outstanding Hairstyling for a Multi-Camera Series or Special	Dancing with the Stars	Nominated	
2015	Primetime Emmy Award	Outstanding Hairstyling for a Multi-Camera Series or Special	Dancing with the Stars	Nominated	
2018	Primetime Emmy Award	Outstanding Hairstyling for a Multi-Camera Series or Special	Dancing with the Stars	Nominated	
