= Primetime Emmy Award for Outstanding Hairstyling for a Variety, Nonfiction or Reality Program =

Television award category

- Awarded for: Outstanding Hairstyling for a Variety, Nonfiction or Reality Program
- Country: United States
- Presented by: Academy of Television Arts & Sciences
- Currently held by: RuPaul's Drag Race (2026)
- Website: emmys.com

This is a list of winners and nominees of the Primetime Emmy Award for Outstanding Hairstyling for a Variety, Nonfiction or Reality Program. The category was previously awarded as Outstanding Hairstyling for a Series. In 2008, it was reorganized and multi-camera series and specials competed for their own award. The category was reclassified and renamed again in 2020.

In the following list, the first titles listed in gold are the winners; those not in gold are nominees, which are listed in alphabetical order. The years given are those in which the ceremonies took place:

== Winners and nominations ==
=== 1970s ===
Outstanding Individual Achievement in Any Area of Creative Technical Crafts

Year	Program	Episode	Nominees	Network
1970
1970	The Don Adams Special: Hooray for Hollywood		Edie Panda	CBS
1974
1974	Benjamin Franklin		Lynda Gurasich	CBS
1974	The Sonny & Cher Comedy Hour		Rena Leuschner	CBS
1975
1975	Benjamin Franklin	"The Ambassador"	Edie Panda	CBS
1975	Little House on the Prairie	"If I Should Wake Before I Die"	Larry Germain	NBC
1976
1976	Eleanor and Franklin		Billie Laughridge, Jean Burt Reilly	ABC
1977
1977	Eleanor and Franklin: The White House Years		Emma di Vittorio, Vivienne Walker	ABC
1977	The Great Houdini		Naomi Cavin	ABC
1977	Little House on the Prairie	"To Live with Fear"	Larry Germain	NBC
1978
1978	The Awakening Land	"Part 3"	Sugar Blymyer	NBC
1978	Little House on the Prairie	"Here Comes the Brides"	Larry Germain, Gladys Witten	NBC

Outstanding Achievement in Hairstyling

Year	Program	Episode	Nominees	Network
1979
1979	The Triangle Factory Fire Scandal		Janice D. Brandow	NBC
1979	Backstairs at the White House	"Book Four"	Susan Germaine, Lola Kemp, Vivian McAteer	NBC
1979	Ike: The War Years	"Part 3"	Jean Burt Reilly	ABC

=== 1980s ===
Year	Program	Episode	Nominees	Network
1980
1980	The Miracle Worker		Larry Germain, Donna Barrett Gilbert	NBC
1980	Fantasy Island	"Dr. Jekyll and Ms. Hyde/Aphrodite"	Joan Phillips	ABC
1980	Haywire		Carolyn Elias, Bette Iverson	CBS
1980	Murder Can Hurt You		Naomi Cavin, Mary Hadley	ABC
1980	The Silent Lovers		Leonard Drake	NBC
1981
1981	Madame X		Shirley Padgett	NBC
1981	Father Damien: The Leper Priest		Janice D. Brandow	NBC
1981	The Jayne Mansfield Story		Silvia Abascal, Janis Clark	CBS
1981	Little House on the Prairie	"To See the Light"	Larry Germain	NBC
1981	Lou Grant	"Stroke"	Jean Austin	CBS
1982
1982	Eleanor, First Lady of the World		Hazel Catmull	CBS
1982	Cagney & Lacey	"Street Scene"	Stephen Robinette	CBS
1982	Fame	"The Strike"	Gloria Montemayor	NBC
1982	Jacqueline Bouvier Kennedy		Emma M. diVittorio, Dione Taylor	ABC
1982	Marco Polo	"Part 4"	Renata Magnanti, Elda Magnanti	NBC
1983
1983	Rosie: The Rosemary Clooney Story		Edie Panda	CBS
1983	The Life and Adventures of Nicholas Nickleby		Mark Nelson	Syndicated
1983	Missing Children: A Mother's Story		Janice D. Brandow	CBS
1983	Wizards and Warriors	"The Rescue"	Sharleen Rassi	CBS
1984
1984	The Mystic Warrior		Dino Ganzino	ABC
1984	The Day After		Dorothea Long, Judy Crown	ABC
1984	Dempsey		Adele Taylor	CBS
1984	George Washington	"Part 1"	Janice D. Brandow, Shirley Crawford, Irene Aparicio, Cathy Engel, Emma M. diVittorio	CBS
1984	Samson and Delilah		Jan Van Uchelen	ABC
1985
1985	The Jesse Owens Story		Robert L. Stevenson	OPT
1985	The Atlanta Child Murders		Janice D. Brandow, Robert L. Stevenson	CBS
1985	The Burning Bed		Stephen Robinette	NBC
1985	Love Lives On		Vivian McAteer	ABC
1985	My Wicked, Wicked Ways: The Legend of Errol Flynn		Adele Taylor	CBS
1985	Robert Kennedy and His Times	"Part 1"	Lynda Gurasich	CBS

Outstanding Hairstyling for a Series

Year	Program	Episode	Nominees	Network
1986
1986	Amazing Stories	"Gather Ye Acorns"	Bunny Parker	NBC
1986	Dynasty	"Masquerade"	Gerald Solomon, Cherie, Linda Leiter Sharp	ABC
1986	Moonlighting	"The Dream Sequence Always Rings Twice"	Judy Crown, Josée Normand	ABC
1987
1987	Moonlighting	"Atomic Shakespeare"	Kathryn Blondell, Josée Normand	ABC
1987	Crime Story	"Top of the World"	Bunny Parker	NBC
1987	Dynasty	"The Ball"	Gerald Solomon, Cherie	ABC
1987	The Facts of Life	"62 Pickup"	JoAnn Stafford-Chaney, Phillip Ackerman	NBC
1987	Max Headroom	"Body Banks"	Janice Alexander	ABC
1988
1988	Designing Women	"I'll Be Seeing You"	Judy Crown, Monique DeSart	CBS
1988	Crime Story	"Moulin Rouge"	Bunny Parker	NBC
1988	Dynasty	"The Fair"	Gerald Solomon, Cherie, Monica Helpman	ABC
1988	Frank's Place	"Dueling Voodoo"	Ora Green	CBS
1988	Star Trek: The Next Generation	"Haven"	Richard Sabre	Syndicated
1989
1989	Quantum Leap	"Double Identity"	Virginia Kearns	NBC
1989	Almost Grown	"If This Diamond Ring Don't Shine"	Susan Schuler-Page, Sharleen Rassi	CBS
1989	Star Trek: The Next Generation	"Unnatural Selection"	Richard Sabre, Georgina Williams	Syndicated
1989	Thirtysomething	"We'll Meet Again"	Carol Pershing	ABC
1989	The Tracey Ullman Show	"The Subway"	Billy Laughridge	Fox

=== 1990s ===
Year	Program	Episode	Nominees	Network
1990
1990	The Tracey Ullman Show	"My Date With Il Duce," "The Thrill Is Gone," "The Wrong Message"	Linle White, Peggy Shannon	Fox
1990	Guns of Paradise	"A Gathering of Guns"	Linda Leiter Sharp	CBS
1990	Murder, She Wrote	"When the Fat Lady Sings"	Ronald W. Smith, Gerald Solomon, Rita Bellissimo, Dino Ganziano, Ann Wadlington	CBS
1990	Star Trek: The Next Generation	"Hollow Pursuits"	Vivian McAteer, Barbara Lampson, Rita Bellissimo	Syndicated
1990	Thirtysomething	"Strangers"	Carol Pershing	ABC
1991
1991	Dark Shadows	"Episode 8"	Dee-Dee Petty, Jan Van Uchelen, Susan Boyd	NBC
1991	Anything but Love	"Long Day's Journey Into... What?"	Joanne Harris, Gus Le Pre, Peggy Shannon	ABC
1992
1992	Homefront	"Man This Joint Is Jumping"	Jerry Gugliemotto, Barbara Ronci	ABC
1992	In Living Color	"310"	Pauletta O. Lewis, Victoria Wood, Pinky Cunningham	Fox
1992	Sessions	"Thursday We Eat Italian"	Lucia Mace	HBO
1992	Star Trek: The Next Generation	"Cost of Living"	Joy Zapata, Patricia Miller	Syndicated
1993
1993	Star Trek: The Next Generation	"Time's Arrow, Part 2"	Joy Zapata, Candace Neal, Patricia Miller, Laura Connolly, Richard Sabre, Julia L. Walker, Josée Normand	Syndicated
1993	Homefront	"Life Is Short"	Jerry Gugliemotto, Georgina Williams	ABC
1993	Murphy Brown	"A Year to Remember"	Judy Crown	CBS
1993	Sisters	"The Cold Light of Day"	Sharleen Rassi, Barry Rosenberg	NBC
1993	Star Trek: Deep Space Nine	"Move Along Home"	Candace Neal, Ronald W. Smith, Gerald Solomon, Susan Zietlow-Maust	Syndicated
1994
1994	Dr. Quinn, Medicine Woman	"Where the Heart Is"	Laura Lee Grubich, Cheri Hufman, Shirley Dolle, Virginia Grobeson, Barbara Minster, Rebecca De Morrio	CBS
1994	Star Trek: Deep Space Nine	"Armageddon Game"	Josée Normand, Ronald W. Smith, Norma Lee, Gerald Solomon	Syndicated
1994	Star Trek: The Next Generation	"Firstborn"	Joy Zapata, Patricia Miller, Laura Connolly, Carolyn Elias, Don Sheldon, Susan Zietlow-Maust	Syndicated
1994	The Young Indiana Jones Chronicles	"Paris, May 1919"	Meinir Jones-Lewis	ABC
1995
1995	Dr. Quinn, Medicine Woman	"A Washington Affair"	Karl Wesson, Kelly Kline, Deborah Holmes Dobson, Virginia Grobeson, Leslie Ann Anderson, Laura Connolly, Caryl Codon-Tharp, Carol Pershing	CBS
1995	Babylon 5	"The Geometry of Shadows"	Tracy Smith	Syndicated
1995	The Nanny	"Stock Tip"	Dugg Kirkpatrick	CBS
1995	Roseanne	"Skeletons in the Closet"	Pixie Schwartz	ABC
1995	Star Trek: Deep Space Nine	"Improbable Cause"	Josée Normand, Norma Lee, Ronald W. Smith, Gerald Solomon, Michael Moore, Chris McBee, Caryl Codon-Tharp, Faith Vecchio, Rebecca De Morrio, Joan Phillips	Syndicated
1995	Star Trek: Voyager	"Caretaker"	Josée Normand, Patricia Miller, Shawn McKay, Karen Asano-Myers, Dino Ganziano, Rebecca De Morrio, Barbara Minster, Janice D. Brandow, Gloria Ponce, Caryl Codon-Tharp, Katherine Rees, Virginia Kearns, Patricia Vecchio, Faith Vecchio, Audrey Levy	UPN
1996
1996	Dr. Quinn, Medicine Woman	"When a Child Is Born"	Karl Wesson, Kelly Kline, Deborah Holmes Dobson, Laura Lee Grubich, Virginia Grobeson, Christine Lee	CBS
1996	Chicago Hope	"Right to Life"	Mary Ann Valdes, Dione Taylor	CBS
1996	Saturday Night Live	"Host: Quentin Tarantino"	David H. Lawrence, Wanda Gregory, Valerie Gladstone-Appel, Linda Rice	NBC
1996	Star Trek: Deep Space Nine	"Our Man Bashir"	Shirley Dolle, Cherie, Lee Crawford, Brian A. Tunstall, Ellen Powell, Susan Zietlow-Maust, Barbara Ronci	Syndicated
1996	Star Trek: Voyager	"Persistence of Vision"	Barbara Minster, Karen Asano-Myers, Laura Connolly, Suzan Bagdadi	UPN
1996	3rd Rock from the Sun	"The Dicks They Are a Changin'"	Pixie Schwartz	NBC
1997
1997	Star Trek: Voyager	"Fair Trade"	Josée Normand, Suzan Bagdadi, Karen Asano-Myers, Monique DeSart, Charlotte Parker, Jo Ann Phillips, Frank Fontaine, Diane Pepper	UPN
1997	Dr. Quinn, Medicine Woman	"Starting Over"	Karl Wesson, Kelly Kline, Deborah Holmes Dobson, Virginia Grobeson, Christine Lee, Leslie Ann Anderson	CBS
1997	Star Trek: Deep Space Nine	"Trials and Tribble-ations"	Norma Lee, Brian A. Tunstall, Jacklin Masteran, Linle White, Francine Shermaine, Caryl Codon-Tharp, Susan Zietlow-Maust, Charlotte Harvey	Syndicated
1997	3rd Rock from the Sun	"A Nightmare on Dick Street"	Pixie Schwartz, Camille Friend	NBC
1997	Tracey Takes On...	"Childhood"	Audrey Futterman-Stern	HBO
1998
1998	Tracey Takes On...	"Smoking"	Audrey Futterman-Stern	HBO
1998	Buffy the Vampire Slayer	"Becoming"	Jeri Baker, Francine Shermaine, Suzan Bagdadi, Susan Carol Schwary, Dugg Kirkpatrick	The WB
1998	Dr. Quinn, Medicine Woman	"A New Beginning"	Deborah Holmes Dobson, Virginia Grobeson, Laura Lee Grubich, Christine Lee, Elaina P. Schulman, Jennifer Guerrero-Mazursky, Kelly Kline	CBS
1998	Star Trek: Deep Space Nine	"Far Beyond the Stars"	Norma Lee, Brian A. Tunstall, Rebecca De Morrio, Darlis Chefalo, Gloria Pasqua Casny, Kathrine Gordon, Hazel Catmull, Ruby Ford, Louisa V. Anthony, Barbara Ronci, Suzan Bagdadi, JoAnn Stafford-Chaney	Syndicated
1998	Star Trek: Voyager	"The Killing Game"	Josée Normand, Charlotte Parker, Viviane Normand, Gloria Montemayor, Chris McBee, Mimi Jafari, Ruby Ford, Delree F. Todd, Laura Connolly, Hazel Catmull, Diane Pepper, Adele Taylor, Barbara Ronci, Lola 'Skip' McNalley	UPN
1999
1999	Tracey Takes On...	"Hair"	Audrey Futterman-Stern	HBO
1999	MADtv	"402"	Matthew Kasten	Fox
1999	Saturday Night Live	"Host: Gwyneth Paltrow"	Bobby H. Grayson	NBC
1999	Star Trek: Deep Space Nine	"Badda-Bing Badda-Bang"	Norma Lee, Brian A. Tunstall, Gloria Pasqua Casny, Rebecca De Morrio, Laura Connolly, Lauran Upshaw, Frank Fontaine, Tim Jones, Susan Zietlow-Maust, Angela Gurule, Gloria Ponce, Virginia Grobeson, Linda Leiter Sharp	Syndicated
1999	That '70s Show	"Prom Night"	Gabriella Pollino, Cindy Costello, Valerie Scott, Deborah Ann Piper	Fox

=== 2000s ===
Year	Program	Episode	Nominees	Network
2000
2000	Saturday Night Live	"Host: Alan Cumming"	Bobby H. Grayson	NBC
2000	Buffy the Vampire Slayer	"Beer Bad"	Sean Flanigan, Lisa Marie Rosenberg, Gloria Pasqua Casny, Loretta Jody Miller	The WB
2000	MADtv	"Movie Show"	Dugg Kirkpatrick, Judith Tiedemann, Christine Curry, Virginia Grobeson, Danny Goldstein, Bryn E. Leetch, Matthew Kasten, Kenneth Michael Beck	Fox
2000	The Sopranos	"Full Leather Jacket"	Mel McKinney, William A. Kohout	HBO
2000	Star Trek: Voyager	"Dragon's Teeth"	Josée Normand, Charlotte Parker, Gloria Montemayor, Viviane Normand, Jo Ann Phillips	UPN
2000	That '70s Show	"Vanstock"	Gabriella Pollino, Cindy Costello, Valerie Scott	Fox
2001
2001	MADtv	"601"	Matthew Kasten, Mishell Chandler, Desmond Miller, Rod Ortega, Mimi Jafari, Fabrizio Sanges	Fox
2001	The Lot	"Daddy Dearest"	Cheri Ruff, Carl Bailey, Stephen Elsbree	AMC
2001	Sex and the City	"All or Nothing"	Michelle Johnson, Jacques Stephane Lempire, Sacha Quarles	HBO
2001	Star Trek: Voyager	"Prophecy"	Josée Normand, Charlotte Parker, Gloria Montemayor	UPN
2001	That '70s Show	"Backstage Pass"	Gabriella Pollino, Cindy Costello, Terrie Velazquez Owen	Fox
2002
2002	Star Trek: Enterprise	"Two Days and Two Nights"	Michael Moore, Gloria Pasqua Casny, Roma Goddard, Laura Connolly, Cheri Ruff	UPN
2002	Alias	"Q&A"	Michael Reitz, Karen Bartek	ABC
2002	Buffy the Vampire Slayer	"Hell's Bells"	Sean Flanigan, Lisa Marie Rosenberg, Francine Shermaine, Thomas Real, Linda Arnold	UPN
2002	Sex and the City	"Ghost Town"	Michelle Johnson, Angel De Angelis, Sacha Quarles, Suzana Neziri	HBO
2002	Six Feet Under	"I'll Take You"	Randy Sayer, Kimberley Spiteri, Pinky Babajian	HBO
2003
2003	American Dreams	"I Want to Hold Your Hand"	Cheri Ruff, Soo-Jin Yoon, Paulette Pennington	NBC
2003	Alias	"The Counteragent"	Michael Reitz, Karen Bartek	ABC
2003	MADtv	"805"	Matthew Kasten, Mishell Chandler, K. Troy Zestos, Stacey Bergman	Fox
2003	Sex and the City	"Plus One Is the Loneliest Number"	Wayne Herndon, Mandy Lyons, Suzana Neziri, Donna Marie Fischetto	HBO
2003	Six Feet Under	"Perfect Circles"	Randy Sayer, Dennis Parker, Pinky Babajian	HBO
2004
2004	Carnivàle	"After the Ball Is Over"	Kerry Mendenhall, Louisa V. Anthony, Elizabeth Rabe	HBO
2004	Alias	"Unveiled"	Michael Reitz, Karen Bartek, Grace Hernandez, Julie M. Woods	ABC
2004	Deadwood	"Plague"	Josée Normand, Peter Tothpal, Susan Carol Schwary, Ellen Powell	HBO
2004	MADtv	"MADtv's 200th Episode"	Matthew Kasten, Mishell Chandler, Anthea Grutsis, Desmond Miller	Fox
2004	Saturday Night Live	"Hosts: Jessica Simpson & Nick Lachey"	Clariss Morgan, Michaelanthony, Linda Rice	NBC
2005
2005	Deadwood	"Boy the Earth Talks To"	Carol Pershing, Terry Baliel, Kimberley Spiteri	HBO
2005	Alias	"Nocturne"	Michael Reitz	ABC
2005	American Dreams	"Starting Over"	Mary Ann Valdes, Norma Lee, Paulette Pennington, Cathrine A. Marcotte	NBC
2005	Carnivàle	"Outside New Canaan"	Norma Lee, Nanci Cascio, Violet Ortiz	HBO
2005	MADtv	"1017"	Matthew Kasten, Anthea Grutsis, Desmond Miller, Raissa Patton	Fox
2005	Star Trek: Enterprise	"In a Mirror, Darkly"	Norma Lee, Nanci Cascio, Violet Ortiz	UPN
2006
2006	Rome	"Stealing from Saturn"	Aldo Signoretti, Ferdinando Merolla, Stefano Ceccarelli, Gaetano Panico	HBO
2006	Alias	"There's Only One Sydney Bristow"	Michael Reitz, Katherine Rees, Shimmy Osman	ABC
2006	Desperate Housewives	"Remember"	Gabor Heiligenberg, Dena Green, James Dunham, Nicole DeFrancesco	ABC
2006	Six Feet Under	"Everyone's Waiting"	Randy Sayer, Miia Kovero, Karl Wesson, Daphne Lawson	HBO
2006	Will & Grace	"The Finale"	Luke O'Connor, Tim Burke	NBC
2007
2007	Rome	"De Patre Vostro (About Your Father)"	Aldo Signoretti, Stefano Ceccarelli, Claudia Catini, Michele Vigliotta	HBO
2007	Dancing with the Stars	"303"	Mary Guerrero, Lucia Mace, Cynthia P. Romo	ABC
2007	Deadwood	"A Constant Throb"	Gabor Heiligenberg, Dena Green, James Dunham, Maria Fernandez DiSarro	HBO
2007	Desperate Housewives	"It Takes Two"	Gabor Heiligenberg, Dena Green, James Dunham, Maria Fernandez DiSarro	ABC
2007	Ugly Betty	"I'm Coming Out"	Mary Ann Valdes, Lynda Kyle Walker, Norma Lee	ABC

Outstanding Hairstyling for a Multi-Camera Series or Special

Year	Program	Episode	Nominees	Network
2008 (60th)
2008 (60th)	Saturday Night Live	"Host: Tina Fey"	Bettie O. Rogers, AnneMichelle Radcliffe, Jodi Mancuso	NBC
2008 (60th)	Dancing with the Stars	"Episode 510A"	Mary Guerrero, Lucia Mace, Cynthia P. Romo, Maria Valdivia	ABC
2008 (60th)	Two and a Half Men	"City of Great Racks"	Pixie Schwartz, Krista Borrelli, Ralph M. Abalos, Janice Zoladz	CBS
2009 (61st)
2009 (61st)	Dancing with the Stars	"Episode 709"	Mary Guerrero, Cynthia P. Romo, Jennifer Guerrero-Mazursky, Maria Valdivia	ABC
2009 (61st)	MADtv	"Episode 1412"	Matthew Kasten, Wendy Southard, Desiree Dizard, Desmond Miller	Fox
2009 (61st)	Saturday Night Live	"Host: Josh Brolin"	Bettie O. Rogers, Jodi Mancuso, Inga Thrasher	NBC
2009 (61st)	Two and a Half Men	"I Think You Offended Don"	Pixie Schwartz, Krista Borrelli, Janice Zoladz, Ralph M. Abalos	CBS

=== 2010s ===
Year	Program	Episode	Nominees	Network
2010 (62nd)
2010 (62nd)	Dancing with the Stars	"Episode 902A"	Mary Guerrero, Kim Messina, Jennifer Guerrero-Mazursky, Maria Valdivia, Cynthia P. Romo, Cyndra Dunn	ABC
2010 (62nd)	The 82nd Annual Academy Awards		Anthony Wilson, Maria Valdivia, Vickie Mynes, Gail Rowell-Ryan	ABC
2010 (62nd)	How I Met Your Mother	"Doppelgangers"	Grace Hernandez, Jennifer Guerrero-Mazursky	CBS
2010 (62nd)	Saturday Night Live	"Host: Betty White"	Bettie O. Rogers, Jodi Mancuso, Inga Thrasher, Jennifer Serio Stauffer, Cara Hannah Sullivan, Christal Schanes	NBC
2010 (62nd)	Two and a Half Men	"That's Why They Call It Ballroom"	Pixie Schwartz, Krista Borrelli, Ralph M. Abalos, Janice Zoladz	CBS
2011 (63rd)
2011 (63rd)	Dancing with the Stars	"Episode 1106"	Kim Messina, Mary Guerrero, Cyndra Dunn, Cynthia P. Romo, Jennifer Guerrero-Mazursky, Rachel Dowling	ABC
2011 (63rd)	America's Got Talent	"Episode 529"	Russell Latham, Annette M. Jones, Carol McCoo, Justina Turk, Desiree Dizard, Mary Lum	NBC
2011 (63rd)	iCarly	"iStart a Fan War"	Mary Guerrero, Kim Messina, Cyndra Dunn, David Larson, Shawn Finch, Cindy Costello	Nickelodeon
2011 (63rd)	The Pee-wee Herman Show on Broadway		Steven Kirkham	HBO
2011 (63rd)	Saturday Night Live	"Host: Anne Hathaway"	Bettie O. Rogers, Jodi Mancuso, Inga Thrasher, Jennifer Serio Stauffer, Christal Schanes	NBC
2012 (64th)
2012 (64th)	Saturday Night Live	"Host: Zooey Deschanel"	Bettie O. Rogers, Jodi Mancuso, Inga Thrasher, Jennifer Serio Stauffer, Cara Hannah Sullivan, Christal Schanes	NBC
2012 (64th)	Dancing with the Stars	"Episode 1407"	Mary Guerrero, Kim Messina, Jennifer Guerrero-Mazursky, Rachel Dowling, Cynthia P. Romo, Sean Smith	ABC
2012 (64th)	Victorious	"April Fools Blank"	Cyndra Dunn, Monica Sabedra, Terrie Velazquez Owen, Shawn Finch	Nickelodeon
2012 (64th)	The Voice	"Episode 210A"	Shawn Finch, Jerilynn Straitiff, Cindy Costello, Cheryl Marks, Renee Ferruggia, Samantha Wen	NBC
2013 (65th)
2013 (65th)	Saturday Night Live	"Host: Jennifer Lawrence"	Bettie O. Rogers, Jodi Mancuso, Inga Thrasher, Jennifer Serio Stauffer, Cara Hannah Sullivan	NBC
2013 (65th)	The Big Bang Theory	"The Bakersfield Expedition"	Faye Woods, Sylvia Surdu, Louise Dowling	CBS
2013 (65th)	Dancing with the Stars	"Episode 1608"	Mary Guerrero, Kim Messina, Jennifer Guerrero-Mazursky, Sean Smith, Cyndra Dunn, Gail Rowell-Ryan	ABC
2013 (65th)	The Oscars		Anthony Wilson, Barbara Cantu, Maria Valdivia, Cynthia P. Romo, Luke O'Connor	ABC
2013 (65th)	The Voice	"The Live Shows, Part 1 (Season 3)"	Shawn Finch, Jerilynn Straitiff, Renee Ferruggia, Cheryl Marks, Corey Hill, Kathleen Leonard	NBC
2014 (66th)
2014 (66th)	Saturday Night Live	"Host: Anna Kendrick"	Bettie O. Rogers, Jodi Mancuso, Inga Thrasher, Jennifer Serio Stauffer, Cara Hannah Sullivan, Joseph Whitmeyer	NBC
2014 (66th)	Dancing with the Stars	"Episode 1805"	Mary Guerrero, Kim Messina, Cyndra Dunn, Sean Smith, Jennifer Guerrero-Mazursky, Gail Rowell-Ryan	ABC
2014 (66th)	Key & Peele	"Substitute Teacher #3"	Amanda Mofield, Raissa Patton	Comedy Central
2014 (66th)	The Oscars		Anthony Wilson, Natasha Allegro, Cynthia P. Romo	ABC
2014 (66th)	The Voice	"Episode 419B"	Shawn Finch, Jerilynn Straitiff, Renee Ferruggia, Samantha Wen, Corey Hill, Cheryl Marks	NBC
2015 (67th)
2015 (67th)	Saturday Night Live	"Host: Martin Freeman"	Bettie O. Rogers, Jodi Mancuso, Inga Thrasher, Jennifer Serio Stauffer, Cara Hannah Sullivan, Joseph Whitmeyer	NBC
2015 (67th)	Dancing with the Stars	"Episode 1907"	Mary Guerrero, Kim Messina, Jennifer Guerrero-Mazursky, Sean Smith, Gail Rowell-Ryan, Dean Banowetz	ABC
2015 (67th)	Key & Peele	"Aerobics Meltdown"	Amanda Mofield, Raissa Patton	Comedy Central
2015 (67th)	So You Think You Can Dance	"Episode 1115"	Sallie Ciganovich, Sean Smith, Dean Banowetz, Ralph M. Abalos, Shawn Finch, Melissa Jaqua	Fox
2015 (67th)	The Voice	"Episode 818B"	Shawn Finch, Jerilynn Straitiff, Renee Ferruggia, James Dunham, Stacey Morris	NBC
2016 (68th)
2016 (68th)	Saturday Night Live	"Host: Fred Armisen"	Bettie O. Rogers, Jodi Mancuso, Inga Thrasher, Jennifer Serio, Cara Hannah Sullivan, Joe Whitmeyer	NBC
2016 (68th)	Dancing with the Stars	"The Finals, Part 1"	Mary Guerrero, Kim Messina, Gail Ryan, Jennifer Guerrero, Sean Smith, Dean Banowetz	ABC
2016 (68th)	Grease: Live		Mary Guerrero, Kim Messina, Gail Ryan, Jennifer Guerrero, Dean Banowetz, Lucia Mace	Fox
2016 (68th)	Key & Peele	"Y'all Ready for This"	Amanda Mofield, Raissa Patton	Comedy Central
2016 (68th)	The Wiz Live!		Charles G. LaPointe, Kevin Maybee, Elizabeth Printz, Amanda Duffy	NBC
2017 (69th)
2017 (69th)	Hairspray Live!		Miia Kovero, Terry Baliel, Roxane Griffin, Lawrence Davis, Jill Crosby, Joy Zapata	NBC
2017 (69th)	Dancing with the Stars	"A Night at the Movies"	Mary Guerrero, Kim Messina, Gail Ryan, Derrick Spruill, Rene Vaca, Patricia Pineda	ABC
2017 (69th)	RuPaul's Drag Race	"Oh. My. Gaga!"	Hector Pocasangre	VH1
2017 (69th)	Saturday Night Live	"Host: Dwayne Johnson"	Jodi Mancuso, Jennifer Serio, Inga Thrasher, Joe Whitmeyer, Cara Hannah Sullivan, Christen Edwards	NBC
2017 (69th)	The Voice	"Live Playoffs, Night 1"	Jerilynn Stephens, Meagan Herrera-Schaaf, Cory Rotenberg, Anna Maria Orzano, Stacey Morris, Darbie Wieczorek	NBC
2018 (70th)
2018 (70th)	RuPaul's Drag Race	"10s Across the Board"	Hector Pocasangre, Gabriel Villarreal	VH1
2018 (70th)	Dancing with the Stars	"Night at the Movies"	Kimi Messina, Gail Ryan, Derrick Spruill, Rene Vaca, Patricia Pineda, Pixie Schwartz	ABC
2018 (70th)	Jesus Christ Superstar Live in Concert		Charles LaPointe, Kevin Maybee	NBC
2018 (70th)	Saturday Night Live	"Host: Tiffany Haddish"	Jodi Mancuso, Jennifer Serio, Inga Thrasher, Joe Whitmeyer, Cara Hannah Sullivan, Amanda Duffy	NBC
2018 (70th)	The Voice	"Live Finale, Part 1"	Jerilynn Stephens, Meagan Herrera-Schaaf, Renee Ferruggia, Derrick Spruill, Alyn Topper, Darbie Wieczorek	NBC
2019 (71st)
2019 (71st)	RuPaul's Drag Race	"Trump: The Rusical"	Hector Pocasangre	VH1
2019 (71st)	Dancing with the Stars	"Halloween Night"	Kimi Messina, Gail Ryan, Cheryl Eckert, Brittany Spaulding, Rhonda O'Neil, Jani Kleibard	ABC
2019 (71st)	Saturday Night Live	"Host: Adam Sandler"	Jodi Mancuso, Cara Hannah Sullivan, Inga Thrasher, Gina Ferrucci, Joe Whitmeyer, Amanda Duffy Evans	NBC
2019 (71st)	The Voice	"Live Top 13 Performances"	Jerilynn Stephens, Meagan Herrera-Schaaf, Renee Ferruggia, Darbie Wieczorek, Stacey Morris, Amber Maher	NBC
2019 (71st)	World of Dance	"Episode 306"	Dean Banowetz, Meagan Herrera-Schaaf, Cory Rotenberg, Yuko Koach, John McCormick, Melanie Verkins	NBC

=== 2020s ===
Year	Program	Episode	Nominees	Network
2020 (72nd)
2020 (72nd)	RuPaul's Drag Race	"I'm That Bitch"	Curtis Foreman, Ryan Randall	VH1
2020 (72nd)	A Celebration of the Music from Coco		Jennifer Guerrero, Yvonne Kupka, Kimi Messina, Gail Ryan, Amber Maher, Yiotis Panayiotou, Megg Massey	Disney+
2020 (72nd)	Dancing with the Stars	"Episode 2802"	Mary Guerrero, Kimi Messina, Gail Ryan, Cheryl Eckert, Jennifer Guerrero, Jani Kleinbard, Amber Maher, Patricia Pineda	ABC
2020 (72nd)	The Oscars		Anthony Wilson, Barbara Cantu, Paula Ashby, Vickie Mynes, Yvonne Kupka, Gail Ryan, Iraina Crenshaw, Luke O'Connor	ABC
2020 (72nd)	The Voice	"Top 10"	Jerilynn Stephens, Amber Maher, Regina Rodriguez, Renee Ferruggia, Darbie Wieczorek, Cory Rotenberg, Danilo Dixon, Robert Ramos	NBC
2021 (73rd)
2021 (73rd)	Saturday Night Live	"Host: Maya Rudolph"	Jodi Mancuso, Cara Hannah, Inga Thrasher, Joe Whitmeyer, Amanda Duffy Evans, Gina Ferrucci	NBC
2021 (73rd)	Dancing with the Stars	"Finale"	Kimi Messina, Gail Ryan, Jani Kleinbard, Amber Maher, Roma Goddard, Regina Rodriguez, Megg Massey, Arrick Anderson	ABC
2021 (73rd)	Legendary	"Pop Tart"	Jerilynn Stephens, Kimi Messina, Dean Banowetz, Kathleen Leonard, Suzette Boozer, Dwayne Ross, Tamara Tripp, Johnny Lomeli	HBO Max
2021 (73rd)	RuPaul's Drag Race	"The Pork Chop"	Curtis Foreman, Ryan Randall	VH1
2021 (73rd)	The Voice	"Live Top 17 Performances"	Jerilynn Stephens, Amber Maher, Kimi Messina, Dean Banowetz, Dwayne Ross, Regina Rodriguez, Stacey Morris, Robert Ramos	NBC
2022 (74th)
2022 (74th)	Annie Live!		Mia Neal, Leah Loukas	NBC
2023 (75th)
2023 (75th)	We're Here	"St. George, Utah"	Abdiel "Gloria" Urcullu	HBO
2024 (76th)
2024 (76th)	Saturday Night Live	"Host: Ryan Gosling"	Jodi Mancuso, Cara Hannah, Inga Thrasher, Joseph Whitmeyer, Amanda Duffy Evans, Chad Harlow, Gina Ferrucci, Elliott Simpson	NBC
2024 (76th)	The Boulet Brothers' Dragula	"Trash Can Children"	Marco Gabellini	Shudder
2024 (76th)	Dancing with the Stars	"Finale"	Kimi Messina, Dwayne Ross, Joe Matke, Jani Kleinbard, Amber Maher, Marion Rogers, Brittany Spaulding	ABC
2024 (76th)	So You Think You Can Dance	"Challenge #2: Broadway"	Crystal Broedel, Cynthia Chapman, Antoinette Black, Ashley Sedmack, Rie "Leay" Cangelosi, Victor Paz	Fox
2024 (76th)	We're Here	"Oklahoma, Part 3"	Abdiel "Gloria" Urcullu, Tyler Funicelli	HBO
2025 (77th)
2025 (77th)	SNL50: The Anniversary Special		Jodi Mancuso, Cara Hannah, Inga Thrasher, Amanda Duffy Evans, Chad Harlow, Gina Ferrucci, Brittany Hartman, Katie Beatty	NBC
2025 (77th)	American Idol	"Finale"	Dean Banowetz, Amber Maher, Cory Rotenberg, Ryan Randall, Kathleen Leonard, Theresa K. Casillas, Lorenzo Martin, Jayson Stacy	ABC
2025 (77th)	The Boulet Brothers' Dragula	"Welcome to Hell!"	Marco Gabellini	Shudder
2025 (77th)	Dancing with the Stars	"Halloween Nightmares"	Kimi Messina, Joe Matke, Marion Rogers, Amber Maher, Florence Witherspoon, Brittany Spaulding, Melanie Ervin	ABC
2025 (77th)	Fantasmas	"The Void"	Amber Jasmin Morrow, Allison Imoto-Suh, Naomi Indira	HBO
2025 (77th)	The Voice	"Live Semi-Final Performances"	Jerilynn Stephens, Darbie Wieczorek, Marion Rogers, Kathleen Leonard, Dominique Diaz, Conrad Hilton	NBC
2026 (78th)
2026 (78th)	RuPaul's Drag Race	"The Rate-A-Queen Talent Show, Part 2"	Suzette Boozer, Henry Sanchez	MTV
2026 (78th)	The Apple Music Super Bowl LX Halftime Show Starring Bad Bunny		Brian Steven Banks, Mariah Montes, Maaliq Amadeus Elliott, Shian Banks, Yvette Shelton, Iraina Crenshaw, Nikki Wright, Paula Ashby	NBC
2026 (78th)	Dancing with the Stars	"Disney Night"	Kimi Messina, Marion Rogers, Joe Matke, Florence Witherspoon, Jerilynn Stephens, Amber Nicholle Maher, Brittany Spaulding, Regina Rodriguez	ABC
2026 (78th)	Saturday Night Live	"Host: Glen Powell"	Jodi Mancuso, Cara Hannah, Inga Thrasher, Amanda Duffy Evans, Chad Harlow, Gina Ferrucci, Jennifer Serio, Katie Beatty	NBC
2026 (78th)	Wicked: One Wonderful Night		Edward Morrison, R'riyana Kline, Tiffany Bloom, Lillie S. Frierson, Cyndra Dunn, Sharif Poston, Lisa Long, Deborah Pierce	NBC

== Programs with multiple awards ==
9 awards

- Saturday Night Live

4 awards

- RuPaul's Drag Race

3 awards

- Dancing with the Stars

== Programs with multiple nominations ==
19 nominations

- Saturday Night Live

18 nominations

- Dancing with the Stars

10 nominations

- The Voice

7 nominations

- MADtv

6 nominations

- RuPaul's Drag Race

3 nominations

- Key & Peele
- That '70s Show
- Two and a Half Men

2 nominations

- The Boulet Brothers' Dragula
- So You Think You Can Dance
- 3rd Rock from the Sun
- The Tracey Ullman Show
- We're Here
