= Nicolas Jurnjack =

French hairdresser

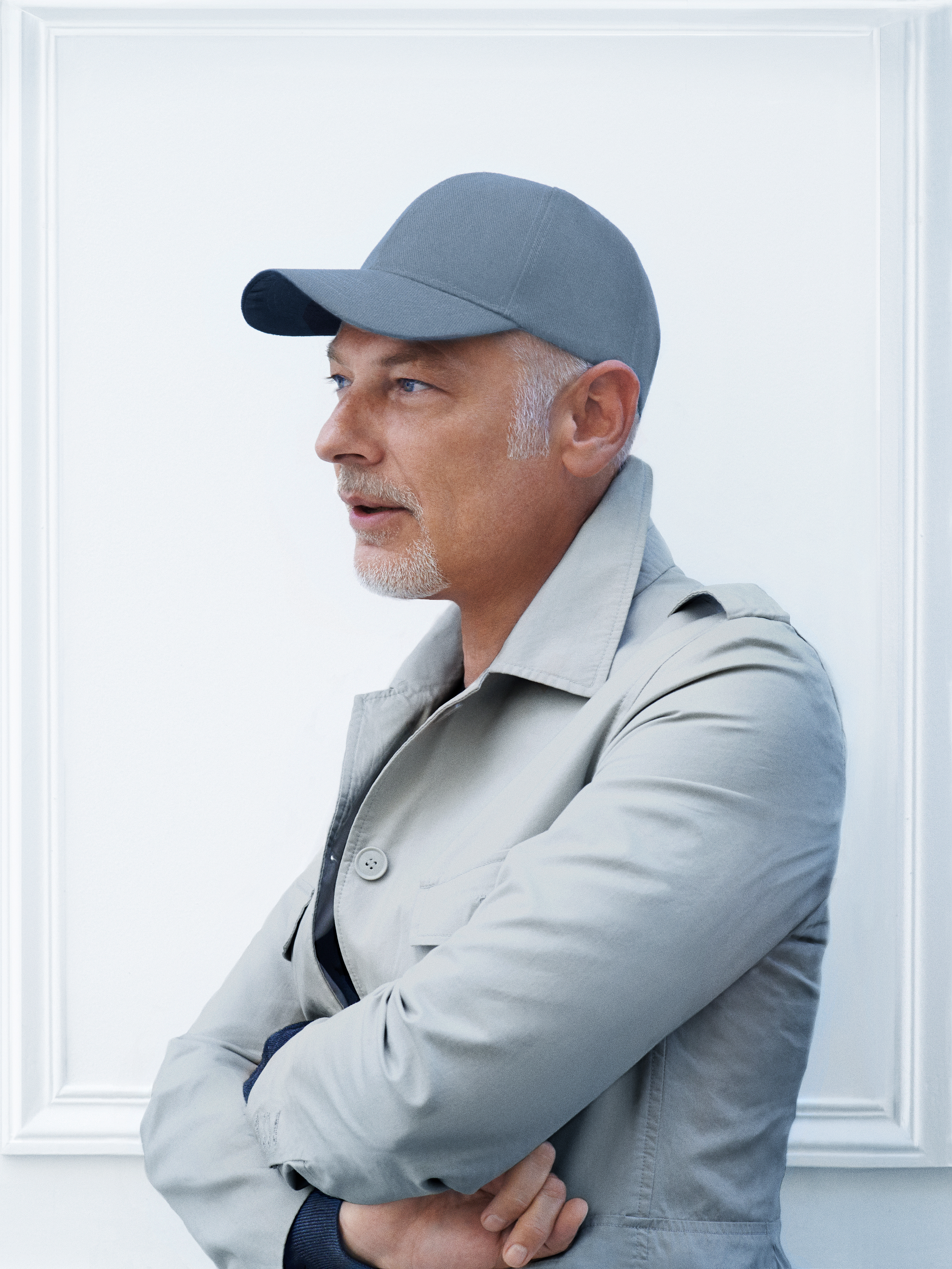
- Nicolas Jurnjack in 2017
- Born: Marseille
- Occupation: Hair Stylist
- Years active: 1984–present
- Website: http://www.nicolasjurnjack.com/

Nicolas Jurnjack is a French-born hair stylist who works in the fashion and beauty industry his credits include Vogue, Elle, Harper’s Bazaar, as well as runway work for designers Alexander McQueen, John Galliano and Alber Elbaz.

== Career ==
Jurnjack was born and raised in Marseille in the South of France, the youngest of 6 children. As a teenager while working in a hair salon as an apprentice, the right place at the right time, he got his first opportunity to style a swimwear shoot for French Elle.

He then moved to Paris, to study hair styling via magazine clippings and plastic heads. He was then hired for styling a cover shoot for French Vogue, his first of hundreds of covers."Nicolas Jurnjack Portfolio"

He has received repeat nominations for France's Best Stylist of the Year and receiving Australia's "Leading Session Stylist of the Year". His work has been shown in the Louvre Museum - six black and white portraits styled by Jurnjack were hung there as part of the International Festival of Fashion Photography. Three were shot by Jeanloup Sieff where the concept was "Paper Hair," and three were shot by Christoph Sillem with the concept of hair created out of match sticks

Nicolas Jurnjack has styled hair for models including Adriana Lima, Bella Hadid, Natasha Poly, Gisele Bündchen, Naomi Campbell, Kate Moss, Carmen Kass, Cindy Crawford, Elle Macpherson, Thomas Boureau and Natalia Vodianova. Celebrities he has styled for include Lea Seydoux, Valeria Bruni Tedeschi, Charlotte Gainsbourg, Estelle Deniaud, Mélanie Thierry Jennifer Lopez, Elisa Sednaoui, Rachel McAdams, Laetitia Casta Juliette Binoche, Alicia Keys, Kristen Stewart, Kiernan Shipka. Kangana Ranaut.

He has created fashion week runway looks for designers, including Alexander McQueen, Alexander McQueen for Givenchy, Jean-Paul Gaultier, Marc Jacobs, John Galliano, Nina Ricci, Alber Elbaz, Olivier Theyskens, Jeremy Scott, Badgley Mischka, Antonio Berardi, Guy Laroche, Richard Tyler and Kenzo. Jurnjack has also styled hair for editorials and covers of many fashion and industry publications, including Vogue US, Vogue Paris, Vogue Italia, Vogue UK and other international Vogue editions, Allure, V Magazine, Harper's Bazaar, Elle, i-D Magazine, The New York Times Magazine, Le Monde, The Sunday Times Style and The Guardian.

In addition, Jurnjack has worked as the Creative Consultant for Jacques Dessange International (for 5 seasons), the Creative Consultant for L'Oreal Techni-Art, as well as the Creative Director (freelance) for Australian Vogue Beauty. Jurnjack's name has been used to endorse brands such as: Jean Louis David, Jean Marc Maniatis, Redken, Matrix, L'Oréal, Schwarzkopf, Cutler, Wella and Avon.

IN THE HAIR: A Fashion Hairstylist's Journey of Creativity, his first book was published in French and English in 2017,

MCB Hair World Conference Nicolas Jurnjack Speaker

AVEDA: Nicolas Jurnjack Special Guest Presentation at Aveda Hair World

ECHOS COIFFURE: Behind the scenes with Nicolas Jurnjack.

TOWN & COUNTRY: 20 Years Ago, Alexander McQueen Made Fashion History "McQueen asked French hairdresser Nicolas Jurnjack to do the hair"

HARPER'S BAZAAR: Picasso's Women

ORIBE: A conversation with Nicolas Jurnjack

TUSH Magazine: Ost Frise - Nicolas Interview by Laura Dunklemann

In 2023, Jurnjack's work was featured in two Paris museum exhibitions, each running for approximately six months. At the Palais Galliera (Musée de la Mode), his hairstyles were exhibited as part of "1997 Fashion Big Bang" (7 March – 16 July 2023), an exhibition on the pivotal year of 1997 in contemporary fashion history, featuring pieces including his work for Alexander McQueen's Givenchy collections. At the Musée des Arts Décoratifs, his creations were featured in "Des Cheveux et des Poils" (5 April – 17 September 2023), an exhibition exploring the role of hair and hairstyling throughout history.

Jurnjack currently works as a consultant for French cosmetics laboratory Ducastel, serving as creative director overseeing the visual identity of the professional hair brands Subtil and Kydra Le Salon, including advertising campaign concepts, model casting, team selection (photographers, wardrobe stylists, make-up artists), advertising films, and the editing of official images. He also provides product guidance for both professionals and the general public, and conducts international master classes to promote the brands, as well as to explain the choice of imagery rooted in a distinctly French editorial fashion style in the tradition of Bazaar and Vogue.

In February 2026, Jurnjack served as creative director for the hairstyling team, in partnership with Kydra le Salon, for Aadnevik's Autumn/Winter 2026 couture show "Jeanne d'Arc" at London Fashion Week, presented on 23 February 2026 at the Royal Horseguards.

Jurnjack joined Kydra le Salon as creative director in 2021, drawn by the brand's French elegance and Scandinavian-inflected identity. Twice a year, he designs the visual direction of the brand's collections

In February 2026, Jurnjack served as style and creative director, for Kydra's Spring/Summer 2026 hair collection, which drew on the imagery of Paris and French red-carpet events.
