= Denise McAdam =

Scottish celebrity hairdresser

Denise Patricia McAdam RVM is a Scottish celebrity hairdresser based in London.

Hailing from Penicuik, she started her hairdressing career with an apprenticeship at Greens Hair Salon in Edinburgh before moving to London.

Denise cuts the hair of many members of the royal family. She did Sarah Ferguson’s hair for her wedding. Since the mid-1970s she has also worked for other public figures, including Bo Derek, Britt Ekland, Ronan Keating, Grace Kelly, Sade, Frank Sinatra, JLS and The Saturdays.

In June 2010 as part of the Queen's Birthday Honours McAdam received the Royal Victorian Medal, "for hairdressing services to the Royal Family". In 2014 she began appearing as one of the main judges on the BBC TV series Hair.
