= Leonard of Mayfair =

British celebrity hairdresser

Leonard Lewis (15 June 1938 – 30 November 2016), known professionally as Leonard of Mayfair, was a British hairdresser, credited with creating the haircut that launched the career of prominent 1960s model Twiggy as well as establishing the careers of other successful British hairdressers, including John Frieda, Daniel Galvin, Nicky Clarke, Keith Wainwright and Michael Gordon. His hair styles were at their most fashionable during the Vogue sittings of the late 1960s and early 1970s, for which he would "illustrate the exuberant moment when hair was somehow a totem of youth and freedom in itself". He worked with many of the leading photographers of the day, including Clive Arrowsmith, Terence Donovan, David Bailey and Barry Lategan for fashion publications such as Vogue and Queen, often collaborating with designer Zandra Rhodes who favoured Leonard's colourist, Daniel Galvin, whose vibrant shades of pinks, blues and reds, were revolutionary at the time.

His film work is also renowned. He worked closely with film director Stanley Kubrick on many of his films. In its heyday, his five-storey salon in London's Mayfair was considered the epicentre of all that was fashionable in the late 1960s and 1970s. His clients included Jack Nicholson, Jerry Hall, Meryl Streep, Warren Beatty, David Frost, Barbra Streisand, Catherine Deneuve, Marsha Hunt (creating her famous bald look), Jean Shrimpton, Ronnie Kray, Reggie Kray, Bianca Jagger, The Beatles, Scott Walker (singer), Liza Minnelli, Faye Dunaway, David Bowie (in his Ziggy Stardust phase), Bob Marley (when he needed his dreads unpicked), John F. Kennedy, long time girlfriend Ivana Zelnickova, Judy Garland, Joan Collins, Donald Trump and Tony Curtis.

In 1988, a brain tumour effectively ended his career. His death was announced on 1 December 2016.

== Early life ==
Lewis was born in Notting Hill Gate in June 1938, the youngest of four children to parents, Amelia and John, but soon moved to Shepherd's Bush. His sister Rene, who was twenty years old when he was born, helped bring him up when his mother's eyesight began to fail

After a brief stint working at an auction house in Putney and also as a barrow boy, he used his savings to pay for his hairdressing apprenticeship at Evansky's in Mount Street, London, and trained with the legendary Rose Evansky. Here he met Nigel Davies, a fellow hairdresser. The pair moved to Vidal Sassoon's salon at 171 New Bond Street, London W1. Davies changed his name to Justin de Villeneuve.

== Career ==
Leonard stayed for one year with Sassoon during which he was trained to cut "the Vidal way". Leonard and Vidal, both from Shepherd's Bush, became firm friends. After a short-lived business partnership with Raphael, a fellow-hairstylist at Sassoon's during which the pair set up the salon Leonard and Raphael at 34 Duke Street, Mayfair, Leonard set up his salon, The House of Leonard at No 6 Upper Grosvenor Street, London W1, a Georgian building with five storeys, which had once belonged to Elsa Schiaparelli. He developed a softer cutting technique and his client base soon became as glamorous as Vidal's with Jackie Kennedy, Terence Stamp, Mick Jagger, Grace Kelly, Marie Helvin, Jerry Hall, and Audrey Hepburn. The salon was glamorous, with long carpeted stairs and Zandra Rhodes-designed pink and grey gowns.

In 1961, John Lennon and Paul McCartney went to Paris for two weeks to stay with Hamburg friend Jürgen Vollmer. They both decided to get their hair cut the way Jurgen and many French youth had their hair styled at the time. Jurgen cut their hair in his hotel room on The Left Bank, but the style lacked the boyish appeal that their manager Brian Epstein wanted. Epstein took them to The House of Leonard, where the hairdresser shaped their pudding basin fringes into the ‘moptop’ cut that swept the world. Paul remained a client for decades.

In 1966, Justin de Villeneuve brought a 15-year-old girl called Lesley Hornby with the nickname "Twiggy", to see Leonard, knowing "he was looking for models on whom to try out his new crop haircut". It was to be Leonard's first big coup as he took eight hours to cut her hair, with Daniel Galvin colouring it. "They kept drying it to see if it fell right. Those short haircuts have to be absolutely precise," Twiggy was quoted as saying. "Looking in the mirror, I saw all these faces looking at me, in a way no one had ever looked at me before". Justin de Villeneuve recognised it as a great turning point. "I knew then that she really was going to make it". Barry Lategan took several photographs the next day. Twiggy recalls: "Leonard hung one of the shots in the lobby of his salon and I went back to school. That really could have been that, but for the fact that one of Leonard’s clients was Deirdre McSharry, fashion editor on the Daily Express and a very influential lady in the fashion world". Deidre McSharry then went on to feature Twiggy in the Daily Express newspaper as "The Face of 66" helping to launch her career.

Leonard trained many of Britain's leading hairdressers, including; Daniel Galvin, John Frieda, and Nicky Clarke. "He was a genius; his work was ahead of its time. To this day, many of London’s top stylists owe a debt of gratitude we can never fully repay," Nicky Clarke was quoted as saying. Michael Gordon, founder of Bumble & Bumble, remembers him from 1969: "In his heyday Leonard was very handsome, stylish and cool. His House of Leonard was a perfect tribute to his style. It was a salon like no other in London and Leonard Lewis quietly reigned". "Hairdressers are still either ex-Leonard or ex-Sassoon’s," Nicky Clarke was quoted as saying. Leonard and Vidal would remain friends, with Vidal once saying, "Without the working ability of Leonard, I might not have reached where I did".

Leonard's career in film started with Hammer Film Productions, as he often styled Michael Carreras and other members of the Carreras family's hair. His first film with director Stanley Kubrick was in 1968 with 2001: A Space Odyssey. For A Clockwork Orange, Kubrick wanted actual hair cuts rather than wigs and "forerunners to the punk Mohawk hairstyle, with the sides of the head shaved and the middle part spiked up and brightly coloured." Leonard worked on Barry Lyndon and then followed with The Shining. Barry Lyndon was highly stylised and required hundreds of intricate wigs. Starring Marisa Berenson and Ryan O'Neal, rumours circulated that each wig had its own first-class seat on the plane from London to Dublin. He also worked on Kubrick's film Full Metal Jacket.

He was hair and wig adviser on Doctor Zhivago, Flash Gordon and Ragtime. Among the other films Leonard worked are The Boy Friend (1971) starring Twiggy and directed by Ken Russell; Murder on the Orient Express (directed by Sidney Lumet, 1974) as well as The Bounty with Roger Donaldson in 1984.

Leonard was a judge for two Miss World pageants.

== Personal life ==
Lewis married model Ricci Wade. They had a son. In 1980, he married Petra Arzberger, a German heiress. They later divorced. He died on 30 November 2016.

== Books ==
Leonard of Mayfair by Leonard Lewis, written with Andrew Crofts, was published by Hutchison in 2000.
