= Deborah Dobson =

American hairstylist and make-up artist

Deborah Holmes Dobson is an American hairstylist and make-up artist. Dobson is known for her work on Dangerous Women, Kelly Kelly, Dr. Quinn, Medicine Woman, General Hospital, So Little Time, Undeclared, The Practice, and Eli Stone. She is alternatively credited as Deborah Holmes Dobson and Deborah Dobson.

== Awards and nominations ==
Emmy awards:

- Won, 1995, Outstanding Individual Achievement in Hairstyling for a series for: Dr. Quinn, Medicine Woman (shared with Carol Pershing, Caryl Codon-Tharp, Laura Connolly, Leslie Ann-Anderson, Virginia Grobeson, Kelly Kline, and Karl Wesson)
- Won, 1996, Outstanding Individual Achievement in Hairstyling for a series for: Dr. Quinn, Medicine Woman (shared with Karl Wesson, Kelly Kline, Laura Lee Grubich, Virginia Grobeson, and Christine Lee)
- Nominated, 1997, Outstanding Hairsytling for a series for: Dr. Quinn, Medicine Woman (shared with Karl Wesson, Kelly Kline, Virginia Grobeson, Christine Lee, and Leslie Ann Anderson)
- Nominated, 1997, Outstanding Hairstyling for a series for: Dr. Quinn, Medicine Woman (shared with Virginia Grobeson, Laura Lee Grubich, Christine Lee, Elaina P. Schulman, Jennifer Guerrero, and Kelly Kline)

Daytime Emmy awards:

- Won, 1982, Outstanding Achievement in Design Excellence for a Daytime Drama Series for: General Hospital (shared with Charles Paul, Jill Farren-Phelps, Dominic Messinger, Katharine Kotorakos, Diane Lewis, Vikki McCarter, Pam P.K. Cole, Jim O'Daniel, John C. Zak, Thomas W. Markle, Grant Velie, Mercer Barrows, and James H. Ellingwood)
- Won, 1985, Outstanding Achievement in Hairstyling for: General Hospital (shared with Cathrine A. Marcotte, Mary Guerrero, and Katherine Kotorakos)
- Nominated, 1999, Outstanding Hairstyling for a Drama Series for: General Hospital (shared with Kimber Lee Anderson)
- Nominated, 2000, Outstanding Achievement in Hairstyling for a Drama Series for: General Hospital (shared with Virginia Grobeson, Paulette Pennington, Michael Anton Prockiw, and Kimber Lee Anderson)

Make-Up Artists and Hair Stylists Guild award:

- Nominated, 2002, Best Character Hair Styling for a Television Series for: Buffy the Vampire Slayer (shared with Karl Wesson, Sean Flanigan, and Lisa Marie Rosenberg)
