= Daniel Galvin =

Daniel William Joseph Galvin, OBE (born April 1944) is a British hairdresser and businessman. He is particularly known for his expertise as a hair colourist.

== Life and career ==
Both Galvin's father and grandfather had been hair stylists in London, as had Galvin's elder brother Joshua. Galvin initially worked in his father's salon in Paddington before becoming an apprentice colourist at Olofson Haute Coiffure in the Brompton Road. In the 1960s he began working at Leonard of Mayfair, where he gave Twiggy the blonde hair colour that launched her career, using his method of "brickwork" highlights. In the late 1960s he also began experimenting with nylon and poster dyes for the designer Zandra Rhodes; Galvin's vibrant shades of pinks, blues, and reds were considered revolutionary at the time. Galvin worked on Stanley Kubrick's 1971 film A Clockwork Orange and was responsible for, among other things, "the hair color for the hairy bits on the tables" in the film's famous Korova Milk Bar scene: "At the time I was the only person doing these crazy colours", Galvin said.

Galvin set up his own salon in 1977 on George Street in London's Marylebone district, where his clientele have included Nicole Kidman, and Margaret Thatcher. He was also Princess Diana's colourist for the last 10 years of her life. Although the Marylebone salon remains the company's flagship, Galvin has a second boutique salon in Kensington, and a partner salon in London's Corinthia Hotel. Galvin is the author of two books on hair styling and colouring and appeared in the 2002 BBC documentary The Real Blow Up: Fashion, Fame and Photography in the '60s.

In the 2006 New Year Honours Galvin was appointed an OBE for services to hairdressing, the highest award, as of that date, that the monarchy had given a hair stylist. (Vidal Sassoon received a CBE several years later.) Galvin's many industry honours include the Lifetime Achievement Award in 2011 from the Fellowship for British Hairdressing. In 2013, he was named Patron of Honour by the Hairdressing Council, in recognition of his support for their campaign to have hairdressers state-registered.

Galvin and his wife Mavis met when he was still an apprentice and she was working as a hair stylist. Their three children, Louise, James, and Daniel Jr., are also hair stylists.

== Publications ==
- Galvin, Daniel (1977). The World of Hair Colour: Art and Techniques of Modern Hair Colouring. Van Nostrand Reinhold. ISBN 0442214510
- Galvin, Joshua and Galvin, Daniel (1985). Hair Matters. Macmillan. ISBN 0333265416
