= Legros de Rumigny =

French hairdresser

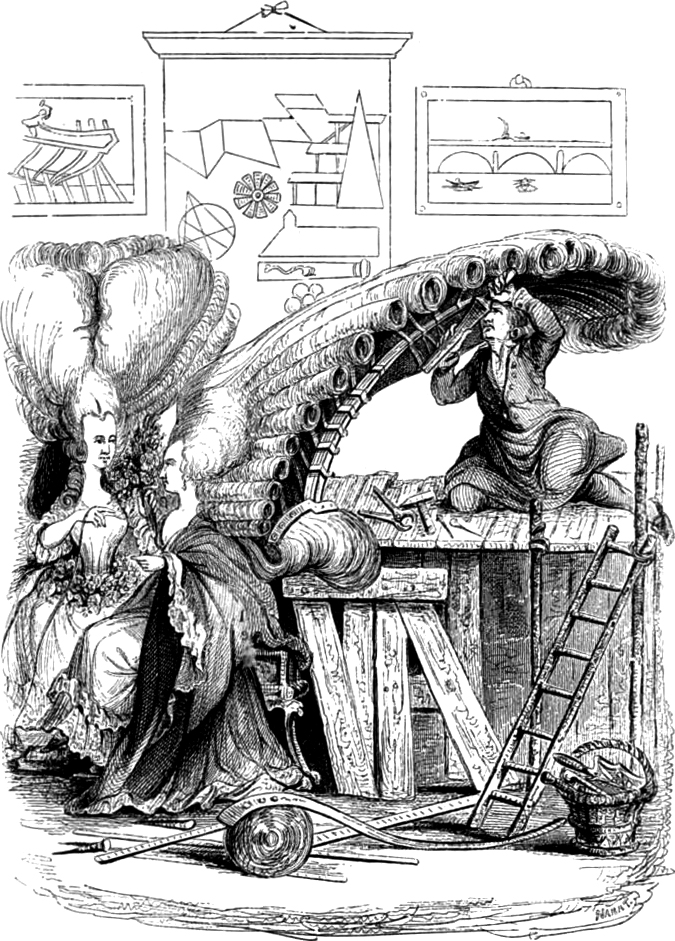
- A caricature of L'Académie pour la coëffures des Dames.
- Born: 1710; France
- Died: 1770 (aged 59–60)
- Occupation: Hairdresser
- Notable work: L'Art de la coeffure des dames françaises

Legros de Rumigny (1710–1770) was a French hairdresser. He was the hairdresser for the French court of the 18th century including Madame de Pompadour. In 1765 he wrote L'Art de la coeffure des dames françaises and established the Académie des Coëffures des Dames Françoises which helped establish hairdressing as a profession.
