= Champagne (coiffeur) =

17th century French hairstylist

Monsieur Champagne was the first celebrity coiffeur for whom the term was coined in France in 1663, shortly after his death. His aristocratic clients included Princess Marie de Gonzague. He was the title character in the comedy Champagne le coiffeur which was staged at the Théâtre du Marais.

== See also ==
- Cosmetology
