= Madame Martin =

Madame Martin (fl. 1671) was the hairdresser at the court of Louis XIV who popularised a style of elaborate tall hair.

Madame Martin was married to a whig maker and her profession was not as unusual in her position; however, she demonstrated true creative talent and became unusual in her success as an independent professional artist in a period when the profession of hair dressing was only just starting to emerge in France.

In 1671, she became a leading artist of her time by creating hair style known as the "harum scarum", which became very popular and Marquise de Sevigne recommended to her daughter. Her style was a new initiative, as she broke with the previous fashion and arranged women's hair upward instead of on the sides, signifying a new style of fashion.

She invented the hair style a' la Maintenon, which was famously adopted by Madame de Maintenon. She remained the leading hair dresser of the French court for several years during the late half of the 17th century.
