= Trevor Sorbie =

Scottish hairdresser (1949–2024)

Trevor Sorbie MBE
- Born: Trevor John Sorbie; 13 March 1949; Paisley, Renfrewshire, Scotland
- Died: 8 November 2024 (aged 75); Fareham, Hampshire, England
- Occupations: Businessman; hairdresser
- Years active: 1964–2024
- Children: 1

Trevor John Sorbie MBE (13 March 1949 – 8 November 2024) was a Scottish celebrity hairdresser and businessman. He is credited as the creator of the wedge haircut and was a four-time winner of British Hairdresser of the Year.

== Career ==
Born in Paisley, Renfrewshire on 13 March 1949, his parents moved south to Ilford when he was aged 11. Leaving school aged 15, Sorbie started cutting hair as an apprentice to his father in 1964. He opened his own barbershop in Edmonton, North London aged 20 in 1969.

Sorbie became stylist for Vidal Sassoon in 1972, and Artistic Director in 1973. Following this he spent time as a stylist and session hairdresser at Toni & Guy and John Frieda, before opening his first salon in Stamford Street, London S.E.1, in 1977 then his second in 1979 in Covent Garden; he opened a third in Brighton in 2004. In 1986 he launched his own range of haircare products. Sorbie was hair stylist for Torvill and Dean on their Skating on Ice tour.

He was appointed a Member of the Most Excellent Order of the British Empire (MBE) in the 2004 New Year Honours for services to hairdressing.

Sorbie appeared on several television programmes, including The Wright Stuff, GMTV, This Morning, The Afternoon Show, The Salon, Mary Queen of Shops, Watchdog and Faking It. He always appeared as himself, as either a stylist or a guest expert. In addition, Sorbie appeared in many magazine articles, including in Harper's Bazaar, Grazia, Prima, Your Hair, Woman & Home, Now Magazine, More Magazine, and Look Magazine.

Sorbie designed a range of consumer hair-care products. The products were designed using feedback from his salon clients.

Sorbie had a line of seven salons; the first "Trevor Sorbie" salon was opened in London's Covent Garden, with salons following in Brighton and Manchester, then a second London one in Hampstead. These have been joined by another London salon in Richmond, and salons in Bristol and Dubai, also.

== Charity work ==
Sorbie started his own charity known as "My New Hair". The charity came to be after Sorbie was involved in helping his brother's wife create a wig that looked like real hair as she battled with bone cancer. After starting My New Hair, Trevor gave up salon work, and worked full-time on the project. Sorbie also visited 10 Downing Street, and since became involved in writing a national policy for NHS wigs. In 2010 the charity's representatives met with MPs, and attended a parliamentary briefing during which 25 MPs were convinced – for the first time – to lobby ministers for better wig services from the NHS. The work of the charity is to teach hairdressers to cut wigs in such a way that they look more like real hair, thus helping cancer patients who lose their hair through chemotherapy and other treatments, to feel as much like themselves as they can. Sorbie's goal, in the long term, was to have salons with hairdressers trained to My New Hair standards nationwide and eventually to scale to an international level. The charity teaches hairdressers through seminars – for which there is a charge which goes directly into the charity – advanced skills sessions, and additionally, hairdressers are also welcomed to shadow Sorbie in one of his salons customising wigs. The charity also works with people suffering from alopecia, and anyone else suffering from medical hair loss.

== Personal life and death ==
Sorbie was married three times and divorced twice; he had one daughter. At the time of his death, he and his wife, Carole, lived in Fareham, Hampshire.

In 2019, Sorbie was diagnosed with bowel cancer. In October 2024, Sorbie revealed on the British television show This Morning that the cancer had spread to his liver, and that he had been given only a few weeks to live. Sorbie died at home the following month, on 8 November, at the age of 75.

== Books ==
- Sorbie, Kris; Wadeson, Jacki; Sorbie, Trevor (1998). Trevor Sorbie: Visions in Hair. MacMillan. ISBN 0-333-74714-3.
- Sorbie, Trevor; Wadeson, Jacki (2005). Trevor Sorbie: The Bridal Hair Book. Thomson Learning. ISBN 1-84480-324-4.
