= Hairdresser =

Person whose occupation is to cut or style hair

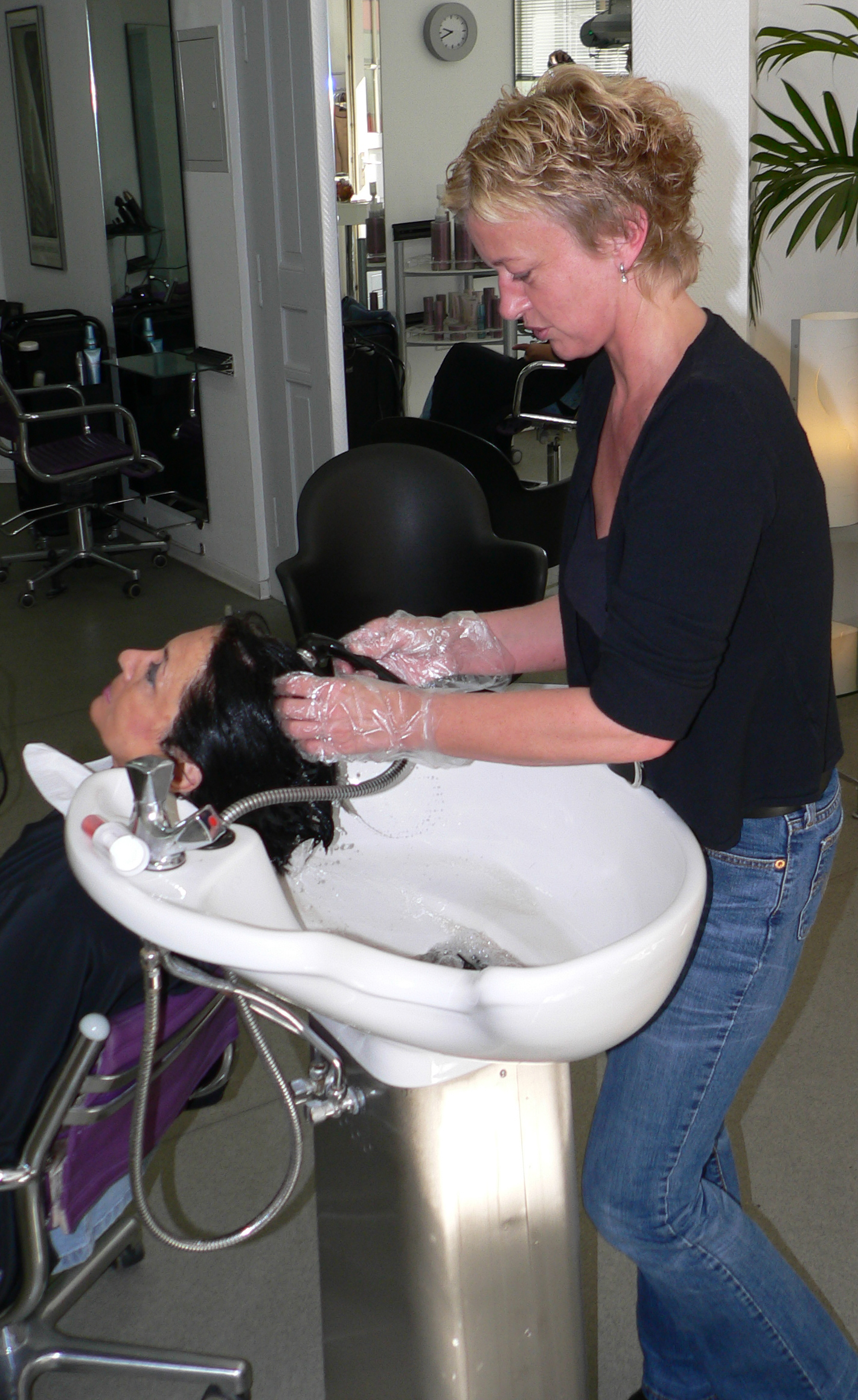
Hairdresser washing a woman's hair

A hairdresser is a person whose occupation is to cut or style hair in order to change or maintain a person's image. This is achieved using a combination of hair coloring, haircutting, and hair texturing techniques. A hairdresser may also be referred to as a 'barber' or 'hairstylist'.

== History ==
=== Ancient hairdressing ===
Hairdressing as an occupation dates back thousands of years. Both Aristophanes and Homer, Greek writers, mention hairdressing in their writings. Barbers were called koureus (κουρεύς) in Greek and tonsor in Latin. Greek and Roman barbers cut and styled hair, shaved beards, trimmed nails, and removed hairs with tweezers. Wealthy individuals were groomed by their own slave attendants, while ordinary people went to the barber shop (κουρεῖον, tonstrina), which was also a popular place to hang out and hear gossip. Female barbers (κουρεύτριαι, tonstrices) were apparently not uncommon. Before the barber began, a rough cloth (ὠμόλινον, involucre) was placed on the customer's shoulders to keep hair off their clothes. The second part of the job was shaving (radere, rasitare, ξυρεῖν), done with a razor (ξυρόν, novacula) stored in a razor-case (θήκη, ξυροθήκη, ξυροδόκης). Some people avoided shaving with razors by using strong hair-removal ointments or plasters like psilothron, acida Creta, Venetum lutum, and dropax. Any hairs missed by the razor were pulled out with tweezers (volsellae, τριχολάβιον). The third part of the barber's job was trimming fingernails, expressed in Greek as ὀνυχίζειν and ἀπονυχίζειν. The tools used for this were called ὀνυχιστήρια.

Many Africans believed that hair is a method to communicate with the Divine Being. It is the highest part of the body and therefore the closest to the divine. Because of this Hairdressers held a prominent role in African communities. The status of hairdressing encouraged many to develop their skills, and close relationships were built between hairdressers and their clients. Hours would be spent washing, combing, oiling, styling and ornamenting their hair. Men would work specifically on men, and women on other women. Before a master hairdresser died, they would give their combs and tools to a chosen successor during a special ceremony.

In ancient Egypt, hairdressers had specially decorated cases to hold their tools, including lotions, scissors and styling materials. Barbers also worked as hairdressers, and wealthy men often had personal barbers within their home. With the standard of wig wearing within the culture, wigmakers were also trained as hairdressers. In ancient Rome and Greece household slaves and servants took on the role of hairdressers, including dyeing and shaving. Men who did not have their own private hair or shaving services would visit the local barbershop. Women had their hair maintained and groomed at their homes. Historical documentation is lacking regarding hairstylists from the 5th century until the 14th century. Hair care service grew in demand after a papal decree in 1092 demanded that all Roman Catholic clergymen remove their facial hair.

=== Europe ===
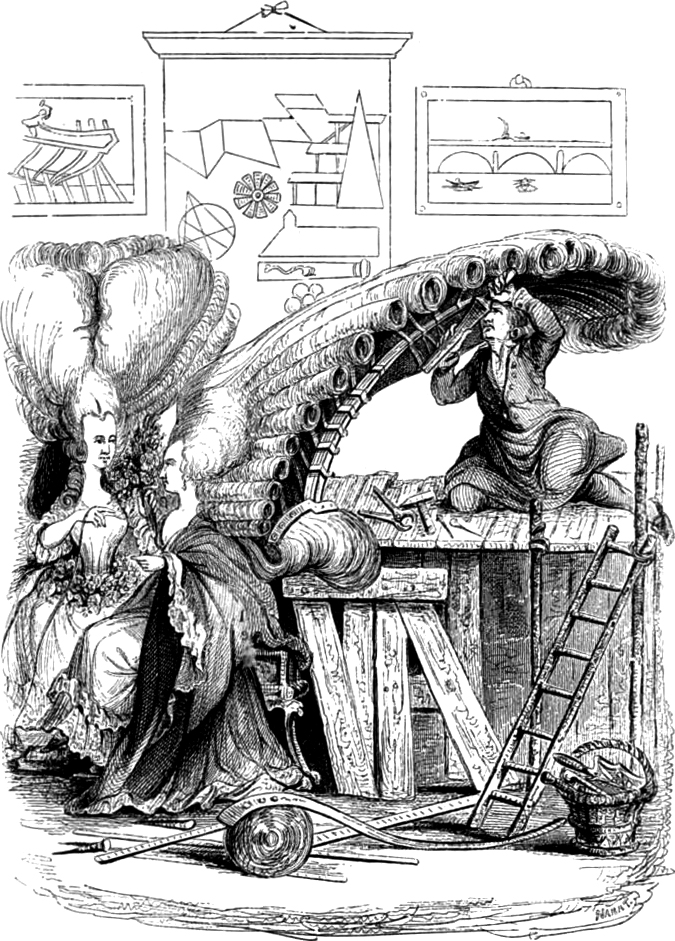
A caricature of a French hairdresser at the Académie de Coiffure, working on a large hairstyle, fashionable of the time, in the 18th century.

The first appearance of the word "hairdresser" is in 17th century Europe, and hairdressing was considered a profession. Hair fashion of the period suggested that wealthy women wear large, complex and heavily adorned hairstyles, which would be maintained by their personal maids and other people, who would spend hours dressing the woman's hair. A wealthy man's hair would often be maintained by a valet. It was in France where men began styling women's hair for the first time, and many of the notable hairdressers of the time were men, a trend that would continue into contemporary times. The first famous male hairdresser was Champagne, who was born in Southern France. Upon moving to Paris, he opened his own hair salon and dressed the hair of wealthy Parisian women until his death in 1658.

Women's hair grew taller in style during the 17th century, popularized by the hairdresser Madame Martin. The hairstyle, "the tower," was the trend with wealthy English and American women, who relied on hairdressers to style their hair as tall as possible. Tall piles of curls were pomaded, powdered and decorated with ribbons, flowers, lace, feathers and jewelry. The profession of hairdressing was launched as a genuine profession when Legros de Rumigny was declared the first official hairdresser of the French court. In 1765 de Rumigny published his book Art de la Coiffure des Dames, which discussed hairdressing and included pictures of hairstyles designed by him. The book was a best seller amongst Frenchwomen, and four years later de Rumigny opened a school for hairdressers: Academie de Coiffure. At the school he taught men and women to cut hair and create his special hair designs.

By 1777, approximately 1,200 hairdressers were working in Paris. During this time, barbers formed unions, and demanded that hairdressers do the same. Wigmakers also demanded that hairdressers cease taking away from their trade, and hairdressers responded that their roles were not the same, hairdressing was a service, and wigmakers made and sold a product. de Rumigny died in 1770 and other hairdressers gained in popularity, specifically three Frenchmen: Frederic, Lassueur, and Léonard. Leonard and Lassueur were the stylists for Marie Antoinette. Leonard was her favorite, and developed many hairstyles that became fashion trends within wealthy Parisian circles, including the loge d'opera, which towered five feet over the wearer's head. During the French Revolution he escaped the country hours before he was to be arrested, alongside the king, queen, and other clients. Léonard emigrated to Russia, where he worked as the premier hairdresser for Russian nobility.

=== 19th century ===
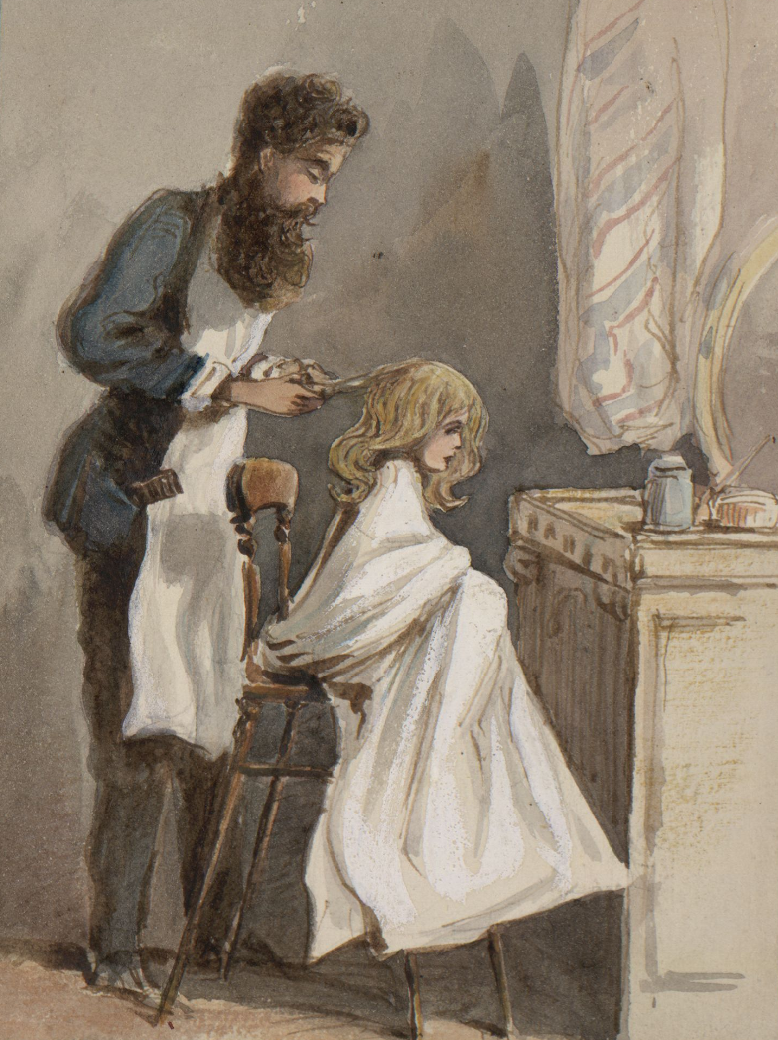
A hairdresser cutting a child's hair, March 26, 1866

Parisian hairdressers continued to develop influential styles during the early 19th century. Wealthy French women would have their favorite hairdressers style their hair from within their own homes, a trend seen in wealthy international communities. Hairdressing was primarily a service affordable only to those wealthy enough to hire professionals or to pay for servants to care for their hair. In the United States, Marie Laveau was one of the most famous hairdressers of the period. Laveau, located in New Orleans, began working as a hairdresser in the early 1820s, maintaining the hair of wealthy women of the city. She was a voodoo practitioner, called the "Voodoo Queen of New Orleans," and she used her connections to wealthy women to support her religious practice. She provided "help" to women who needed it for money, gifts and other favors.

French hairdresser Marcel Grateau developed the "Marcel wave" in the late part of the century. His wave required the use of a special hot hair iron and needed to be done by an experienced hairdresser. Fashionable women asked to have their hair "marceled." During this period, hairdressers began opening salons in cities and towns, led by Martha Matilda Harper, who developed one of the first retail chains of hair salons, the Harper Method.

A Dutch hairstylist gives a woman the "Coup Sixty-One" hairstyle. After completing the look, he then shows that his styling can withstand the elements, with a watering can demonstration.

=== 20th century ===
Beauty salons became popularized during the 20th century, alongside men's barbershops. These spaces served as social spaces, allowing women to socialize while having their hair done and other services such as facials. Wealthy women still had hairdressers visit their home, but, the majority of women visited salons for services, including high-end salons such as Elizabeth Arden's Red Door Salon.

Major advancements in hairdressing tools took place during this period. Electricity led to the development of permanent wave machines and hair dryers. These tools allowed hairdressers to promote visits to their salons, over limited service in-home visits. New coloring processes were developed, including those by Eugène Schueller in Paris, which allowed hairdressers to perform complicated styling techniques. After World War I, the bob cut and the shingle bob became popular, alongside other short haircuts. In the 1930s complicated styles came back into fashion, alongside the return of the Marcel wave. Hairdressing was one of the few acceptable professions during this time for women, alongside teaching, nursing and clerical work.

== Modern hairdressing ==
=== Specialties ===
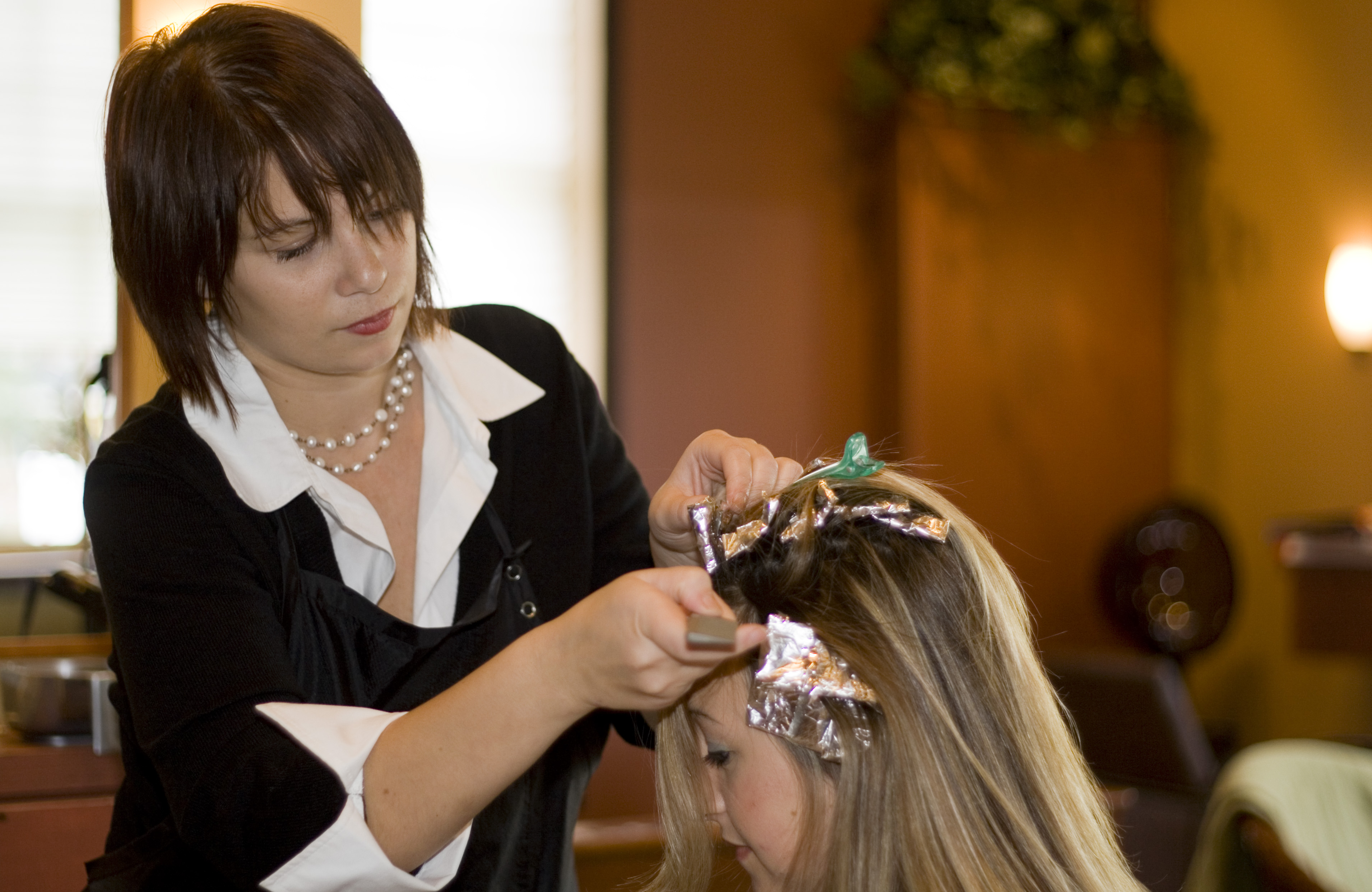
A picture of a hairstylist coloring her client's hair

Some hairstylists specialize in particular services, such as colorists, who specialize in coloring hair.

== By country ==
=== United States ===
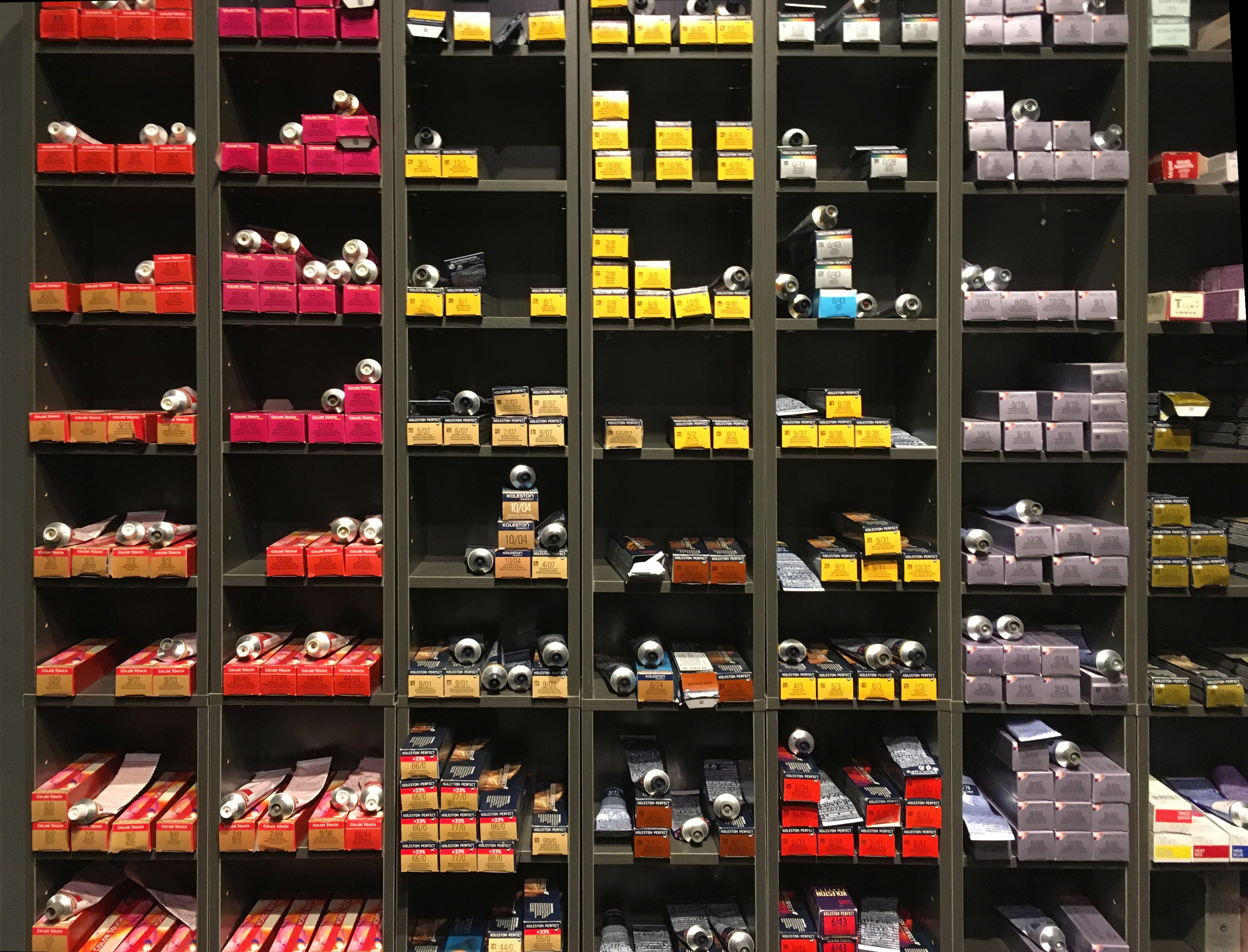
Shelf with a great number of different hair colours, each having a colour code printed on the packaging, at a hairdresser in Germany. In practice, often two or more colours are mixed with each other to achieve a certain intermediate colour tone, which requires significant experience.

Occupationally, hairdressing is expected to grow faster than the average for all other occupations, at 20%. A state license is required for hairdressers to practice, with qualifications varying from state to state. Generally a person interested in hairdressing must have a high school diploma or GED, be at least 16 years of age, and have graduated from a state-licensed barber or cosmetology school. Full-time programs often last 9 months or more, leading to an associate degree. After students graduate from a program, they take a state licensing exam, which often consists of a written test, and a practical test of styling or an oral exam. Hairdressers must pay for licenses, and occasionally licenses must be renewed. Some states allow hairdressers to work without obtaining a new license, while others require a new license. About 44% of hairdressers are self-employed, often putting in 40-hour work weeks, and even longer among the self-employed. In 2008, 29% of hairstylists worked part-time, and 14% had variable schedules. As of 2008, people working as hairdressers totaled about 630,700, with a projected increase to 757,700 by 2018. During the COVID-19 pandemic, hairstylists in the United States became independent professionals rather than employees in increasing numbers, a trend that was also facilitated by the proliferation of booking and business management apps in the salon industry. By 2022, according to the Professional Beauty Association, the majority of the approximately 1.2 million salon-related businesses in the United States were independently owned. Most of these businesses in the industry are owned by women.

== Occupational health hazards ==
Like many occupations, hairdressing is associated with potential health hazards stemming from the products workers use on the job as well as the environment they work in. Many beauty products, such as hair dyes and chemical relaxers, contain hazardous substances like formaldehyde and parabens. These can cause skin irritation, respiratory problems, and long-term health effects, including cancer and reproductive issues. Exposure risks are highly variable throughout the profession due to differences in the physical workspace, such as use of proper ventilation, as well as individual exposures to various chemicals throughout one's career. Hairdressers encounter a variety of chemicals on the job due to handling products such as shampoos, conditioners, sprays, chemical straighteners, permanent curling agents, bleaching agents, and dyes. While the U.S. Food and Drug Administration does hold certain guidelines over cosmetic products, such as proper labeling and provisions against adulteration, the FDA does not require approval of products prior to being sold to the public. This leaves opportunity for variations in product formulation, which can make occupational exposure evaluation challenging. However, there are certain chemicals that are commonly found in products used in hair salons and have been the subject of various occupational hazard studies.

=== Formaldehyde ===
Formaldehyde is a chemical used in various industries and has been classified by the International Agency for Research on Cancer as "carcinogenic to humans". The presence of formaldehyde and methylene glycol, a formaldehyde derivative, have been found in hair smoothing products, such as the Brazilian Blowout. The liquid product is applied to the hair, which is then dried using a blow dryer. Simulation studies as well as observational studies of working salons have shown formaldehyde levels in the air that meet and exceed occupational exposure limits. Variations in observed levels are a function of ventilation used in the workplace as well as the levels of formaldehyde, and its derivatives, in the product itself.

=== Aromatic amines ===
Aromatic amines are a broad class of compounds containing an amine group attached to an aromatic ring. IARC has categorized most aromatic amines as known carcinogens. Their use spans several industries including use in pesticides, medications, and industrial dyes. Aromatic amines have also been found in oxidative (permanent) hair dyes; however due to their potential for carcinogenicity, they were removed from most hair dye formulations and their use was completely banned in the European Union.

Phthalates

Phthalates are a class of compounds that are esters of phthalic acid. Their main use has been as plasticizers, additives to plastic products to change certain physical characteristics. They have also been widely used in cosmetic products as preservatives, including shampoos and hair sprays. Phthalates have been implicated as endocrine disrupting chemicals, compounds that mimic the body's own hormones and can lead to dysregulation of the reproductive and neurologic systems as well as changes in metabolism and cell proliferation.

=== Health considerations ===
==== Reproductive ====
Most hairdressers are women of childbearing age, which lends to additional considerations for potential workplace exposures and the risks they may pose. There have been studies linking mothers who are hairdressers with adverse birthing outcomes such as low birth weight, preterm delivery, perinatal death, and neonates who are small for gestational age. However, these studies failed to show a well-defined association between individual risk factors and adverse birthing outcomes. Other studies have also indicated a correlation between professional hairdressing and menstrual dysfunction as well as subfertility. However, subsequent studies did not show similar correlations. Due to such inconsistencies, further research is required.

Oncologic

The International Agency for Research on Cancer or IARC, has categorized occupational exposures of hairdressers and barbers to chemical agents found in the workplace as "probably carcinogenic to humans" or category 2A in their classification system. This is due in part to the presence of chemical compounds historically found in hair products that have exhibited mutagenic and carcinogenic effects in animal and in vitro studies. However, the same consistent effects have yet to be fully determined in humans. There have been studies showing a link between occupational exposure to hair dyes and increased risk of bladder in male hairdressers but not females. Other malignancies such as ovarian, breast and lung cancers have also been studied in hairdressers, but the outcomes of these studies were either inconclusive due to potential confounding or did not exhibit an increase in risk.

==== Respiratory ====
Volatile organic compounds have been shown to be the largest inhalation exposure in hair salons, with the greatest concentrations occurring while mixing hair dyes and with use of hair sprays. Other notable respiratory exposures included ethanol, ammonia, and formaldehyde. The concentration of exposure was generally found to be a function of the presence or absence of ventilation in the area in which they were working. Studies have exhibited an increased rate of respiratory symptoms experienced such as cough, wheezing, rhinitis, and shortness of breath among hairdressers when compared to other groups. Decreased lung function levels on spirometry have also been demonstrated in hairdressers when compared to unexposed reference groups.

==== Dermal ====
Contact dermatitis is a common dermatological diagnosis affecting hairdressers. Allergen sensitization has been considered the main cause for most cases of contact dermatitis in hairdressers, as products such as hair dyes and bleaches, as well as permanent curling agents contain chemicals that are known sensitizers. Hairdressers also spend a significant amount of time engaging in wet work with their hands being directly immersed in water or by handling of wet hair and tools. Overtime, this type of work has also been implicated in increased rate of irritant dermatitis among hairdressers due to damage of the skins natural protective barrier

== See also ==
- Asymmetric cut
- Hairstyle
  - List of hairstyles
- Make-Up Artists & Hair Stylists Guild Awards
- Hot roots
