= 1920s =

Decade of the Gregorian calendar (1920–1929)

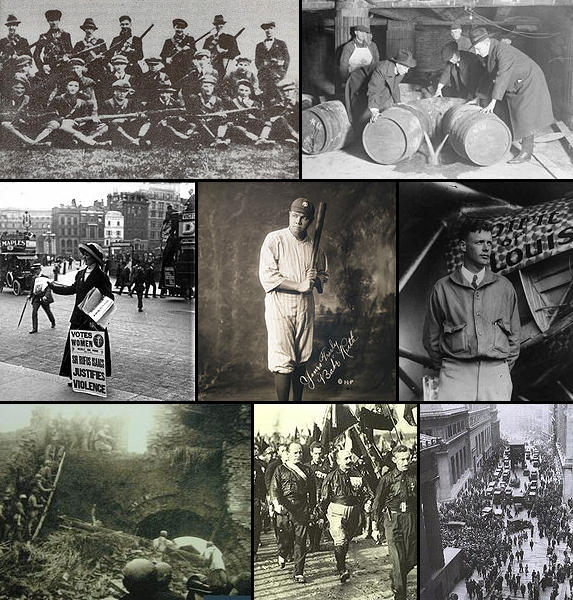
From left, clockwise: Third Tipperary Brigade Flying Column No. 2 under Seán Hogan during the Irish War of Independence, 1920; Prohibition agents destroying barrels of alcohol, 1921, in accordance with the 18th amendment, which made alcoholic beverages illegal in the United States throughout the entire decade; In 1927, Charles Lindbergh embarks on the first solo nonstop flight from New York to Paris on the Spirit of St. Louis; A crowd gathering on Wall Street after the 1929 stock market crash, which led to the Great Depression; Benito Mussolini and fascist Blackshirts during the March on Rome in 1922; The People's Liberation Army attacking government defensive positions in Shandong, during the Chinese Civil War; The women's suffrage campaign leads to numerous countries granting women the right to vote and be elected; Babe Ruth becomes the most famous baseball player of the time.

The 1920s (pronounced "nineteen-twenties"; often shortened to the "'20s" or the "Twenties") was a decade that began on January 1, 1920, and ended on December 31, 1929. Primarily known for the economic boom that occurred in the Western World following the end of World War I (1914–1918), the decade is frequently referred to as the "Roaring Twenties" or the "Jazz Age" in America and Western Europe, and the "Golden Twenties" in Germany, while French speakers refer to the period as the "Années folles" ('crazy years') to emphasize the decade's social, artistic, and cultural dynamism.

The devastating Wall Street crash in October 1929 is generally viewed as a harbinger of the end of 1920s prosperity in North America and Europe. In the Soviet Union, the New Economic Policy was created by the Bolsheviks in 1921, to be replaced by the first five-year plan in 1928. The 1920s saw the rise of radical political movements, with the Red Army triumphing against White movement forces in the Russian Civil War, and the emergence of far-right political movements in Europe. In 1922, the fascist leader Benito Mussolini seized power in Italy. Other dictators that emerged included Józef Piłsudski in Poland, and Peter and Alexander Karađorđević in Yugoslavia. First-wave feminism made advances, with women gaining the right to vote in the United States (1920), Albania (1920), Ireland (1921), and with suffrage being expanded in Britain to all women over 21 years old (1928).

In Turkey, nationalist forces defeated Greece, France, Armenia, and Britain in the Turkish War of Independence, leading to the Treaty of Lausanne (1923), a treaty more favorable to Turkey than the earlier proposed Treaty of Sèvres. The war also led to the abolition of the Ottoman Caliphate. Nationalist revolts also occurred in Ireland (1919–1921) and Syria (1925–1927). Under Mussolini, Italy pursued a more aggressive domestic and foreign policy, leading to the nigh-eradication of the Sicilian Mafia and the Second Italo-Senussi War in Libya respectively. In 1927, China erupted into a civil war between the Kuomintang (KMT)-led government of the Republic of China (ROC) and forces of the Chinese Communist Party (CCP). Civil wars also occurred in Paraguay (1922–1923), Ireland (1922–1923), Honduras (1924), Nicaragua (1926–1927), and Afghanistan (1928–1929). Saudi forces conquered Jabal Shammar and subsequently, Hejaz.

A severe famine occurred in Russia (1921–1922) due to the combined effects of economic disturbance because of the Russian Revolution and the Russian Civil War, exacerbated by rail systems that could not distribute food efficiently, leading to 5 million deaths. Another severe famine occurred in China (1928–1930), leading to 6 million deaths. The Spanish flu pandemic (1918–1920) and Russian typhus epidemic (1918–1922), which had begun in the previous decade, caused 25–50 million and 2–3 million deaths respectively. Major natural disasters of this decade include the 1920 Haiyuan earthquake (258,707~273,407 deaths), 1922 Shantou typhoon (50,000–100,000 deaths), 1923 Great Kantō earthquake (105,385–142,800 deaths), and 1927 Gulang earthquake (40,912 deaths).

Silent films were popular in this decade, with the highest-grossing film of this decade being either the American silent epic adventure-drama film Ben-Hur: A Tale of the Christ or the American silent war drama film The Big Parade, depending on the metrics used. Sinclair Lewis was a popular author in the United States in the 1920s, with his books Main Street and Elmer Gantry becoming best-sellers. Best-selling books outside the US included the Czech book The Good Soldier Švejk, which sold 20 million copies. Songs of this decade included "Mack the Knife" and "Tiptoe Through the Tulips".

During the 1920s, the world population increased from 1.87 to 2.05 billion, with approximately 700 million births and 525 million deaths in total.

== Social history ==
The Roaring Twenties brought about several novel and highly visible social and cultural trends. These trends, made possible by sustained economic prosperity, were most visible in major cities like New York, Chicago, Paris, Berlin, and London. "Normalcy" returned to politics in the wake of hyper-emotional patriotism during World War I, jazz blossomed, and Art Deco peaked. For women, knee-length skirts and dresses became socially acceptable, as did bobbed hair with a finger wave or marcel wave. The women who pioneered these trends were frequently referred to as flappers.

The era saw the large-scale adoption of automobiles, telephones, motion pictures, radio, and household electricity, as well as unprecedented industrial growth, accelerated consumer demand and aspirations, and significant changes in lifestyle and culture, mostly in the urbanized areas of the Western World. The media became increasingly more important and began to focus on celebrities like sports heroes and movie stars and began to include women. Some film historians call this distribution of images and invention a "frenzy of the visible." Large baseball stadiums were built in major US cities, in addition to palatial cinemas.

Many independent countries passed women's suffrage after 1918. Academics such as Arthur Marwick have argued that this occurred because countries wanted to reward the role women played on the home front. However, some scholars like Ellen Dubois have argued that this perspective is incorrect, pointing out some belligerent countries like Italy did not grant suffrage. Meanwhile, some countries like the Netherlands which did not participate in the war did grant suffrage to women.

== Politics and wars ==
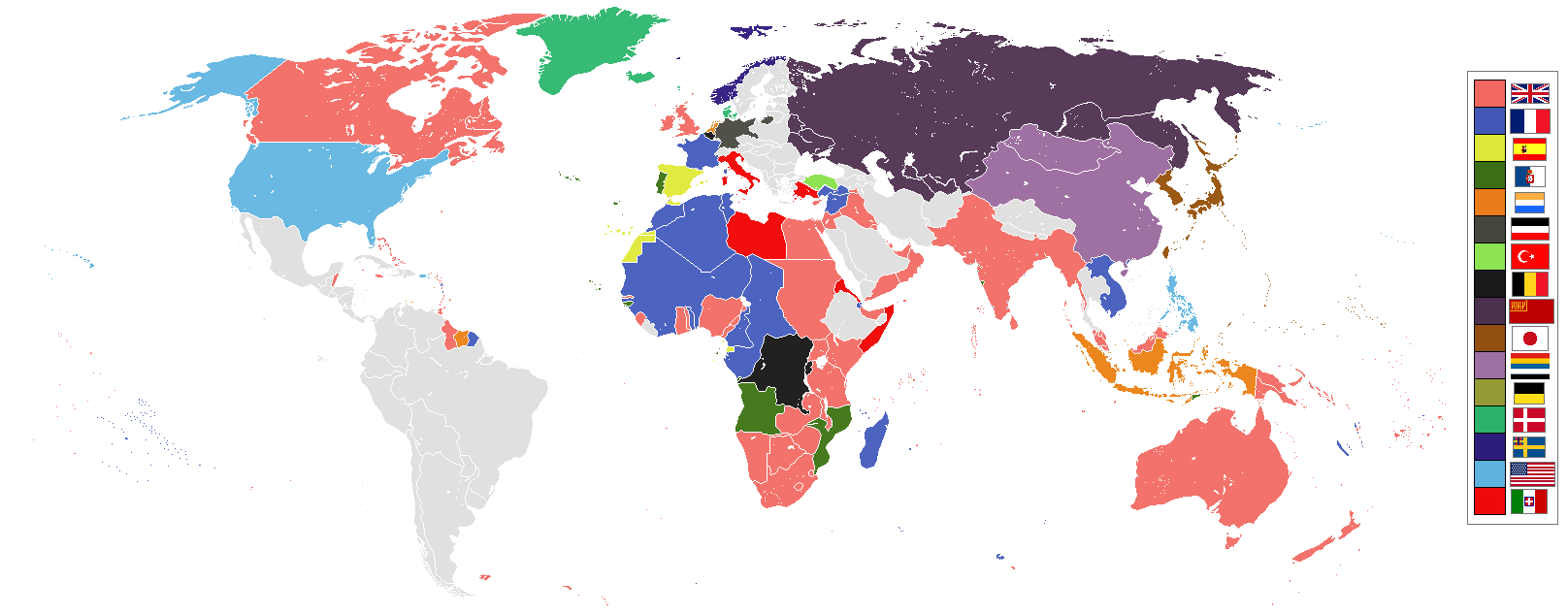
Map of the world from 1920, two years after World War I

=== Wars ===
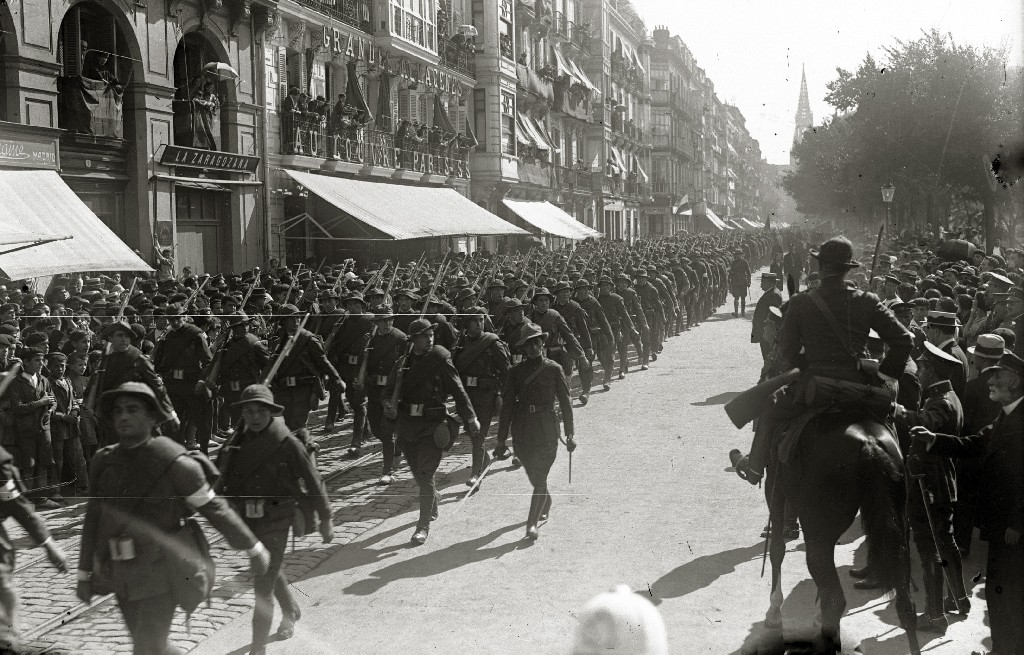
Spanish troops in San Sebastián, prior to their departure to the Rif War

- Turkish War of Independence (May 1919 – July 1923)
  - Greco-Turkish War (May 1919 – October 1922)
  - Turkish–Armenian War (September – December 1920)
  - Franco-Turkish War (December 1918 – October 1921)
  - Royalist and separatist revolts (1919–1923)
- Unification of Saudi Arabia
  - Rashidi–Saudi War (1903–1921)
  - Kuwait–Saudi War (1919–1920)
  - Hejaz–Saudi War (1919–1925)
  - Transjordan-Saudi War (1922–1924)
- Polish–Soviet War (February 1919 – March 1921)
- Irish War of Independence (January 1919 – July 1921)
- Third Anglo-Afghan War (May – August 1919)
- Iraqi Revolt (1920)
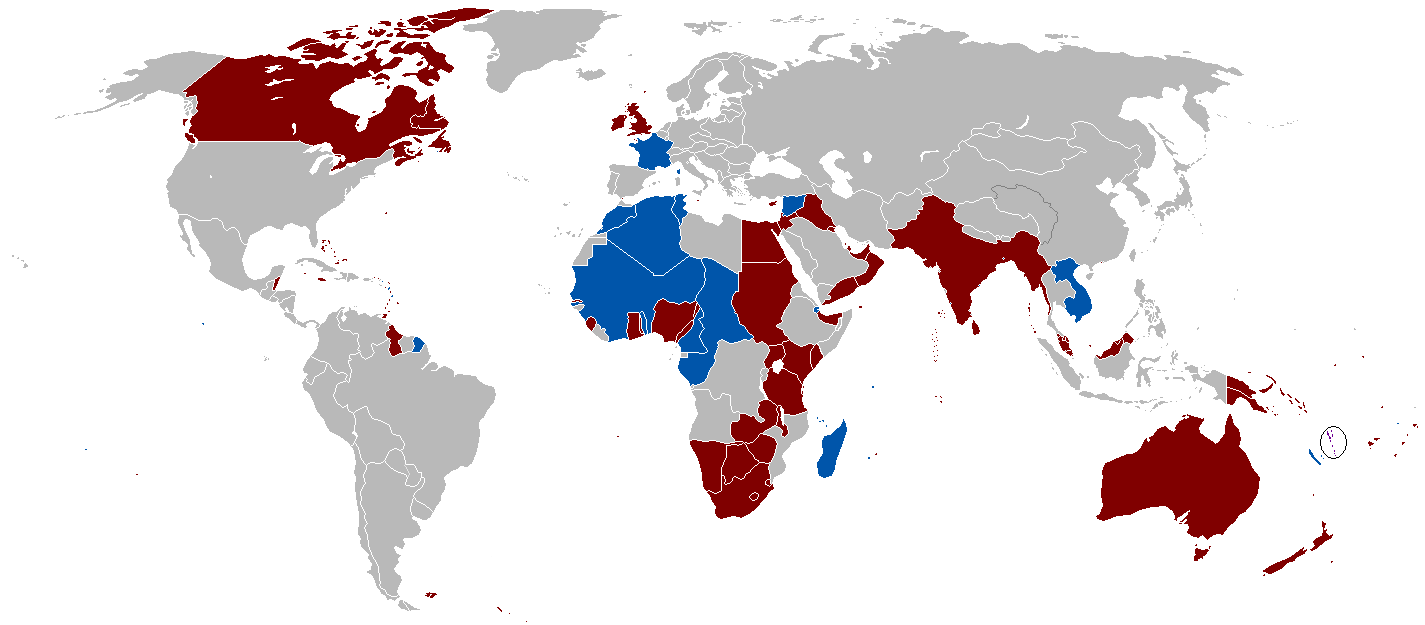
  The British and French colonial empires in 1920
- Rif War (1921–1926)
- Vlora War (1920)
- Second Italo-Senussi War (1923–1932)
- Great Syrian Revolt (1925–1927)
- United States occupation of Nicaragua (1912–1933)
- United States occupation of Haiti (1915–1934)
- United States occupation of the Dominican Republic (1916–1924)

=== Internal conflicts ===
- Russian Civil War (November 1917 – October 1922)
  - Tambov Rebellion (August 1920 – June 1921)
  - Allied intervention in the Russian Civil War (1918–1925)
- Patagonia Rebelde (1920–1922)
- Mahmud Barzanji revolts (1920–1922)
- Irish Civil War (June 28, 1922 – May 24, 1923)
- Cristero War in Mexico (1926–1929)
- Chinese Civil War (first phase 1927–1936)
- Ararat rebellion (1927–1930)
- Kongo-Wara rebellion (1928–1931)
- Afghan Civil War (November 14, 1928 – October 13, 1929)

=== Major political changes ===
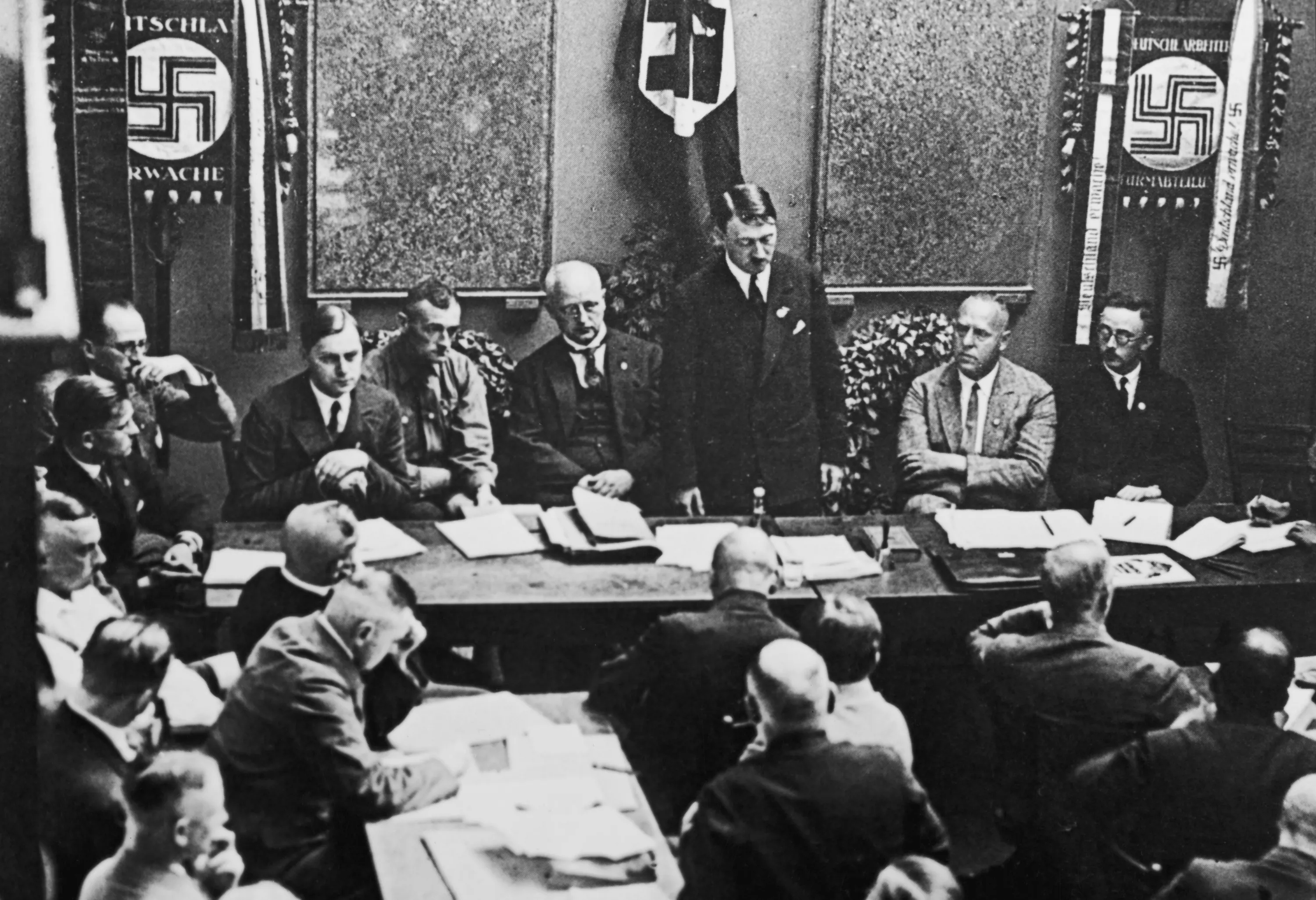
Adolf Hitler (standing) delivers a speech in February 1925.

- Rise of radical political movements such as communism led by the Soviet Union and fascism led by Italy.
- League of Nations and associated bodies as experiments in international cooperation and prevention of wars

=== Decolonization and independence ===
- Irish Free State gains independence from the United Kingdom in 1922.
- Egypt officially becomes an independent country through the Declaration of 1922, though it still remains under the military and political influence of the British Empire.

=== Prominent political events ===
==== Peace and disarmament ====
- Washington Naval Conference of 1922
  - followup treaties for the Limitation of Naval Armament
- Geneva Protocol 1925, outlaws poison gas
- Geneva Naval Conference 1927
- Kellogg–Briand Pact (1928) signed by most nations promising not to declare war.
- London Naval Treaty, 1930
- Conference for the Reduction and Limitation of Armaments 1932–1934

==== Women's suffrage ====
- Women's suffrage movement continues to make gains as women obtain full voting rights in the United Kingdom in 1918 (women over 30) and in 1928 (full enfranchisement), in the United States in 1920. Also : full or partial gains in Uruguay 1917; Canada, 1917–1925 except Quebec (1940); Czechoslovakia 1920; Irish Free State, 1922; Burma, 1922; Italy, 1925 (partial); Ecuador 1929.

==== United States ====
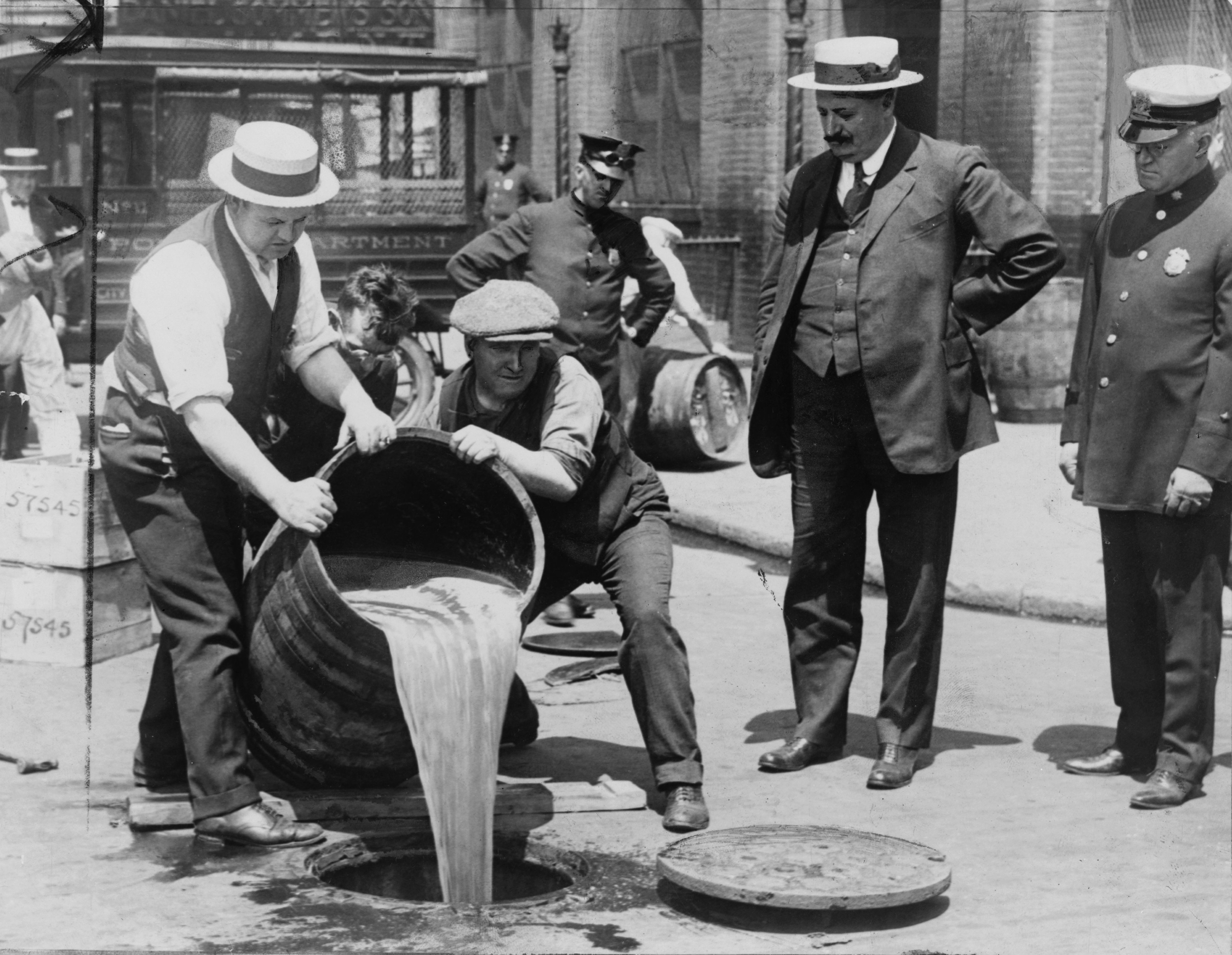
Prohibition agents emptying barrels of alcohol

- The Osage Indian murders of the 1920s lead to the federal government launching the first large scale investigation by the recently formed Bureau of Investigation, which would later become the Federal Bureau of Investigation (FBI).
- Prohibition of alcohol occurs in the United States. Prohibition in the United States began January 16, 1919, with the ratification of the Eighteenth Amendment to the U.S. Constitution, effective as of January 17, 1920, and it continued throughout the 1920s. Prohibition was finally repealed in 1933. Organized crime turns to smuggling and bootlegging of liquor, led by figures such as Al Capone, boss of the Chicago Outfit.
- The Immigration Act of 1924 places restrictions on immigration. National quotas curbed most Eastern and Southern European nationalities, further enforced the ban on immigration of East Asians, South Asians, and Southeast Asians, and put mild regulations on nationalities from the Western Hemisphere (Latin Americans).
- The major sport was baseball and the most famous player was Babe Ruth.
- The Lost Generation (which characterized disillusionment), was the name Gertrude Stein gave to American writers, poets, and artists living in Europe during the 1920s. Famous members of the Lost Generation include Cole Porter, Gerald Murphy, Patrick Henry Bruce, Waldo Peirce, Ernest Hemingway, F. Scott Fitzgerald, Zelda Fitzgerald, Ezra Pound, John Dos Passos, and Sherwood Anderson.
- A peak in the early 1920s in the membership of the Ku Klux Klan of four to five million members (after its reemergence in 1915), followed by a rapid decline down to an estimated 30,000 members by 1930.
- The Scopes trial (1925), which declared that John T. Scopes had violated the law by teaching evolution in schools, creating tension between the competing viewpoints of creationism and evolution.

==== Europe ====
The Union of Soviet Socialist Republics (Soviet Union) is created in 1922.

Benito Mussolini and Fascist Blackshirts during the March on Rome in 1922

- Polish–Soviet War (1919–1921); Poland defeats Soviet advance; Ukraine and Belarus are divided.
- Major armed conflict in Ireland including Irish War of Independence (1919–1921) resulting in part of Ireland becoming an independent country in 1922 followed by the Irish Civil War (1922–1923).
- Russian famine of 1921–22 claimed up to five million victims.
- The Union of Soviet Socialist Republics (Soviet Union) is created in 1922.
- Benito Mussolini leader of the National Fascist Party became Prime Minister of Italy, shortly thereafter creating the world's first fascist government. The Fascist regime establishes a totalitarian state led by Mussolini as a dictator. The Fascist regime restores good relations between the Roman Catholic Church and Italy with the Lateran Treaty, which creates Vatican City. The Fascist regime pursues an aggressive expansionist agenda in Europe such as by raiding the Greek island of Corfu in 1923, pressuring Albania to submit to becoming a de facto Italian protectorate in the mid-1920s, and holding territorial aims on the region of Dalmatia in Yugoslavia.
- In Germany, the Weimar Republic suffers from economic crisis in the early 1920s and hyperinflation of currency in 1923. From 1923 to 1925 the Occupation of the Ruhr takes place. The Ruhr was an industrial region of Germany taken over by the military forces of the French Third Republic and Belgium, in response to the failure of the Weimar Republic under Chancellor Wilhelm Cuno to keep paying the World War I reparations. The recently formed fringe National Socialist German Workers' Party (a.k.a. Nazi Party) led by Adolf Hitler attempts a coup against the Bavarian and German governments in the 1923 Beer Hall Putsch, which fails, resulting in Hitler being briefly imprisoned for one year in prison where he writes Mein Kampf.
- Turkish War of Independence (1919–1923).
- United Kingdom general strike (1926).

==== Asia ====
- The Qajar dynasty ended under Ahmad Shah Qajar as Reza Shah Pahlavi founds the Pahlavi dynasty, which later became the last monarchy of Iran.
- The Northern Expedition (1926–1928)
- The Chinese Civil War begins (1927–1937).
- In the Kingdom of Afghanistan, Amanullah Khan's reforms cause conflict with conservative factions, resulting in the Afghan Civil War.

==== Africa ====
- Pan-Africanist supporters of Marcus Garvey's Universal Negro Improvement Association and African Communities League (UNIA-ACL) are repressed by colonial powers in Africa. Garvey's UNIA-ACL supported the creation of a state led by black people in Africa including African Americans.

==== Latin America ====
- Rural workers' strikes are put down by the Argentine Army, in the province of Santa Cruz, Argentina. Approximately 300–1,500 workers were shot and killed under the orders of president Hipólito Yrigoyen. This uprising is remembered as Patagonia Rebelde (Rebel Patagonia).
- Argentina becomes the second country in the world (only after the USSR) to create a state-owned oil and gas exploration and production company, YPF.

== Economics ==
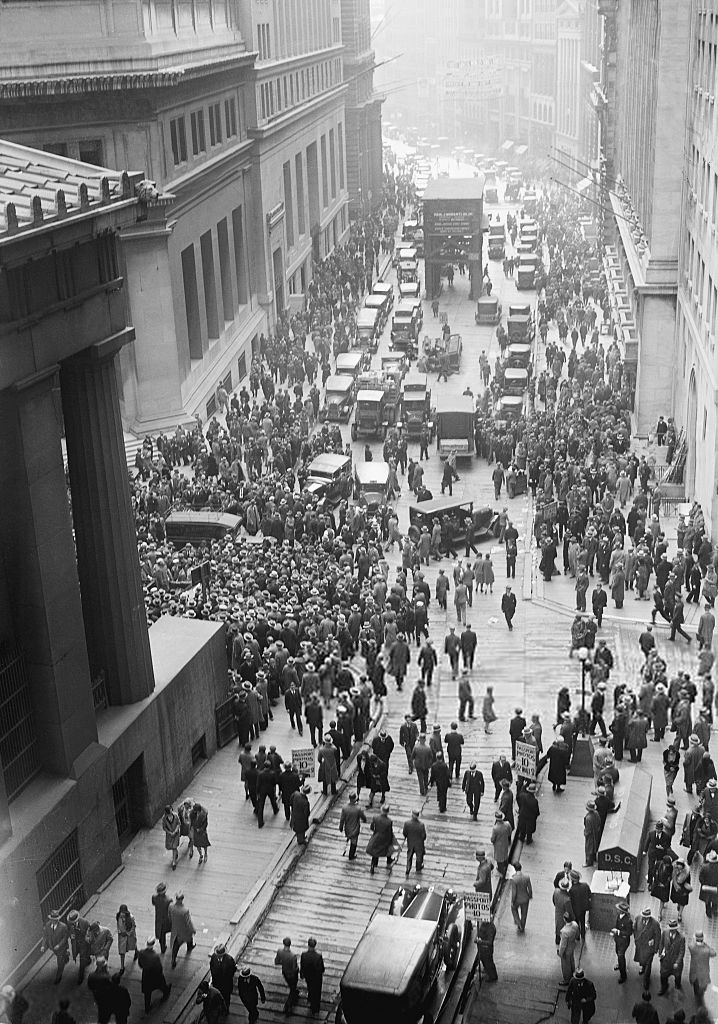
Crowd gathering after the Wall Street crash of 1929

- Economic boom ended by "Black Tuesday" (October 29, 1929); the stock market crashes, leading to the Great Depression. The market actually began to drop on Thursday October 24, 1929, and the fall continued until the huge crash on Tuesday October 29, 1929.
- The New Economic Policy is created by the Bolsheviks in the Russian Soviet Federative Socialist Republic, to be replaced by the first five-year plan in 1928.
- The Dawes Plan, through which the U.S. made significant loans to Germany in order to help stabilize its economy and make war reparations payments, was enacted in 1924.
- Average annual inflation for the decade was virtually zero but individual years ranged from a high of 3.47% in 1925 to a deflationary −11% in 1921.

Dow Jones Industrial, 1928–1930

== Natural disasters ==
- The Great Kantō earthquake struck the main Japanese island of Honshū on 1 September 1923. The earthquake had a magnitude of 7.9 on the moment magnitude scale.
- The 1920 Haiyuan earthquake struck central China on 16 September with a magnitude of 8.2 on the moment magnitude scale, killing 273,407.
- The 1922 Shantou typhoon killed upwards of 100,000 people in southern China.
- The 1928 Okeechobee hurricane killed 4,112 people in the Caribbean and the United States, resulting in major flooding around Lake Okeechobee.
- The 1927 Gulang earthquake struck Tibet and China, measuring 7.6 on the moment magnitude scale and killing 40,900 people.
- The Tri-State tornado outbreak struck the United States on 18 March 1925. The 1925 Tri-State tornado, which the outbreak gets its name from, became the deadliest tornado in US history, as it killed 695 people, whom 613 of which in Illinois, 71 in Indiana, and 12 (possibly more) in Missouri. The outbreak as a whole, killed 751.
  - The tornado, was the deadliest in history, until 1989, where a F3 tornado hit Bangladesh, killing 1300. However, The Tri-State Tornado is still the 2nd deadliest in history, and the deadliest in the United States.

== Assassinations and attempts ==
Prominent assassinations, targeted killings, and assassination attempts include:

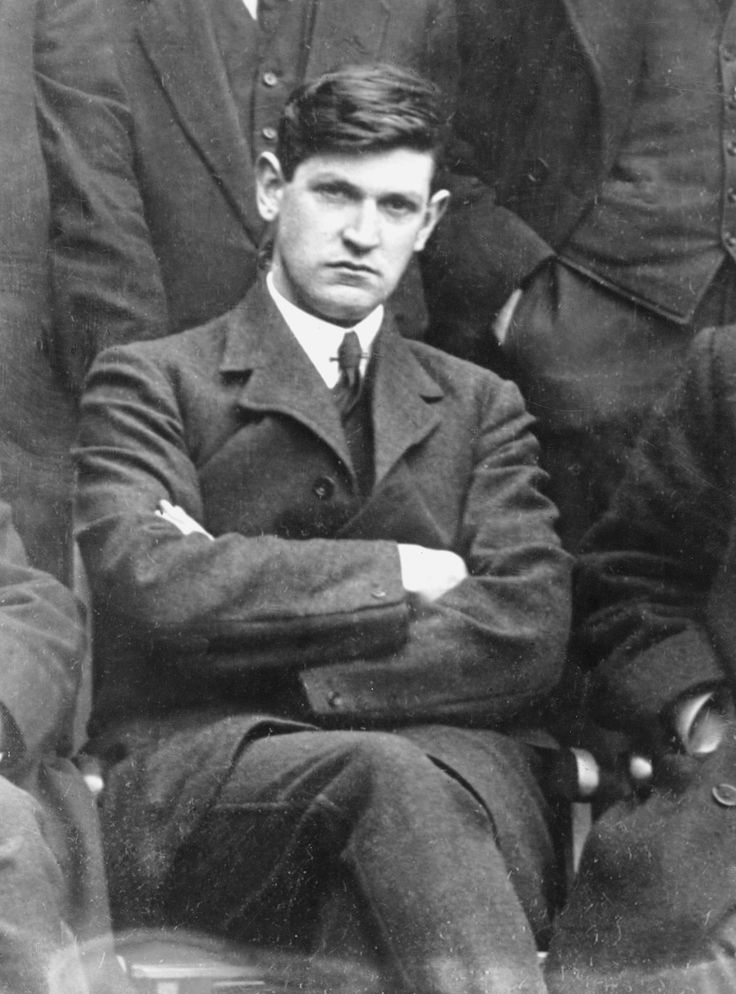
Michael Collins (Irish leader)

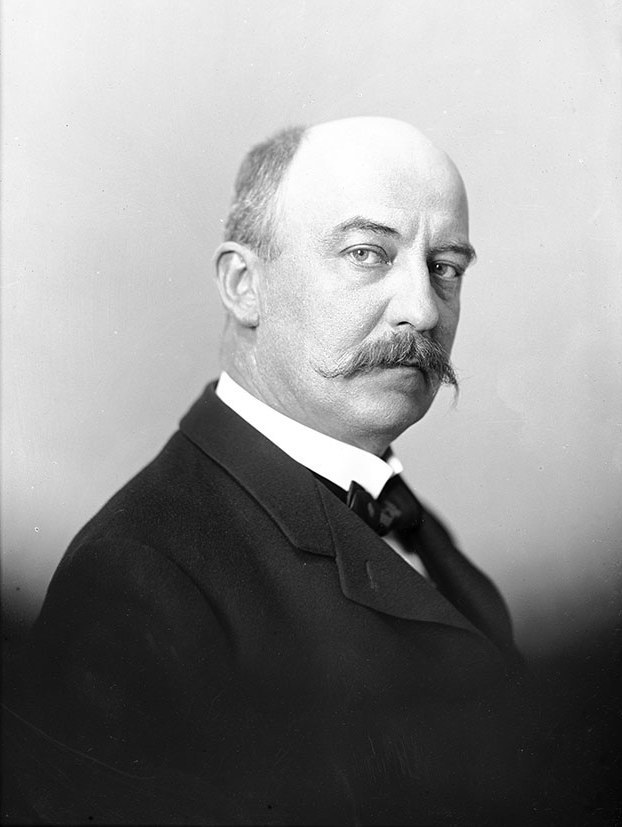
Gabriel Narutowicz

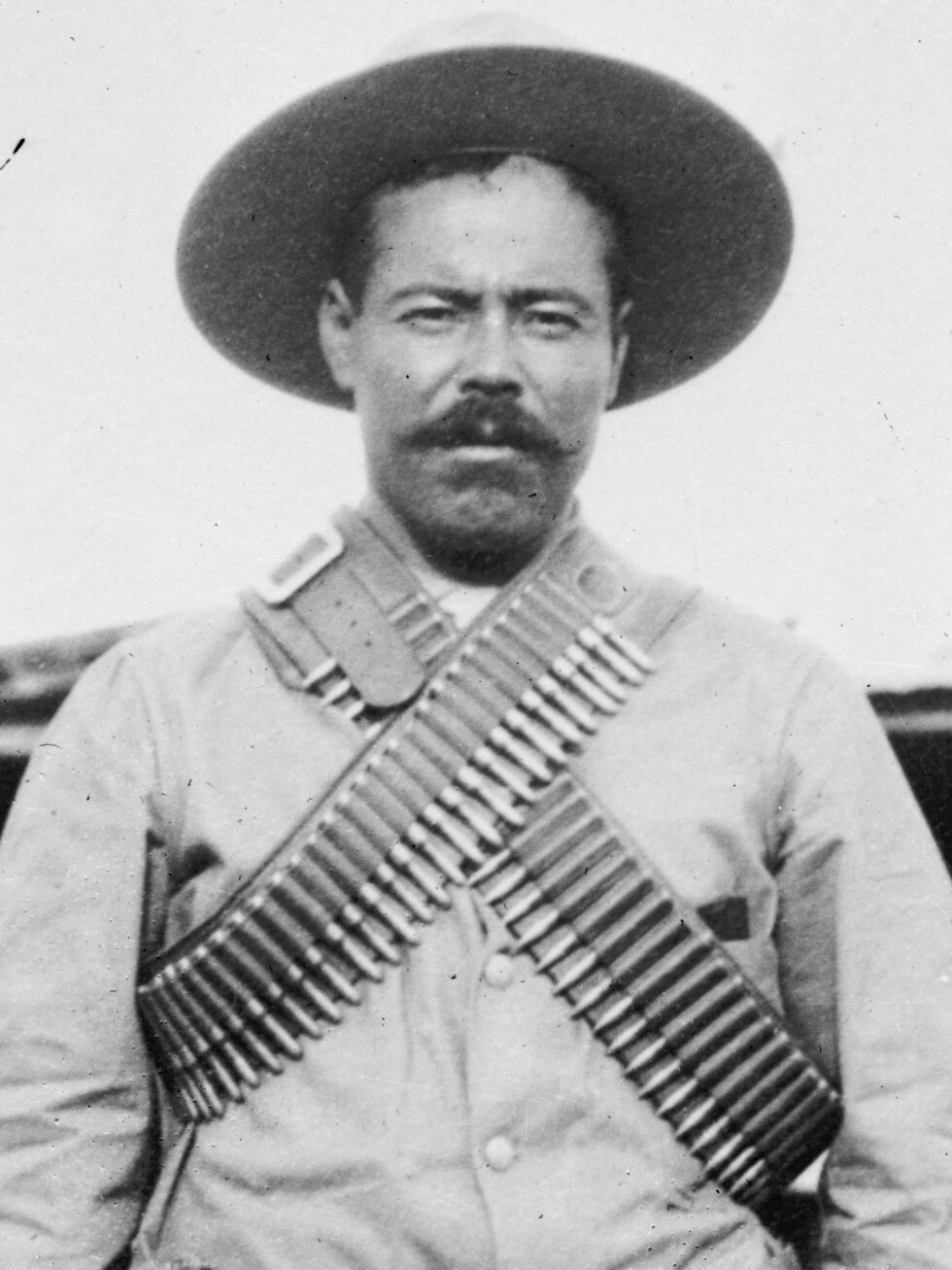
Pancho Villa

- Venustiano Carranza, 44th President of Mexico, is assassinated while escape and sleeping in Tlaxcalantongo in the Sierra Norte de Puebla mountains. His forces were under attack there by General Rodolfo Herrero, a local chieftain and supporter of Carranza's former allies on 21 May 1920.
- Hara Takashi, Prime Minister of Japan, is assassinated by Nakaoka Kon'ichi on 4 November 1921.
- Walther Rathenau, Foreign Minister of Germany is assassinated by Ernst Werner Techow, Erwin Kern, and Hermann Willibald Fischer, all members of Organisation Consul on June 24, 1922.
- Michael Collins (Irish leader), was an Irish revolutionary, soldier and politician who was a leading figure in the early-20th century struggle for Irish revolutionary. Was shot and killed in an ambush by anti-Treaty forces on 22 August 1922.
- Gabriel Narutowicz, a first President of Poland is assassinated by Eligiusz Niewiadomski on December 16, 1922.
- Francisco "Pancho" Villa, a Mexican Revolutionary general is assassinated by a group of seven assassins on July 20, 1923.
- Zhang Zuolin, was a Chinese warlord who ruled Manchuria from 1916 to 1928. Was killed when his personal train was destroyed by an explosion at the Huanggutun Railway Station that had been plotted and committed by the Kwantung Army of the Imperial Japanese Army on June 4, 1928.
- Álvaro Obregón, 46th President of Mexico, he was re-elected to the presidency in 1928 but he was assassinated at La Bombilla restaurant before he could take office by José de León Toral, on July 17, 1928.

== Science and technology ==
=== Technology ===
- John Logie Baird invents the first working mechanical television system (1925). In 1928, he invents and demonstrates the first color television.
- Warner Brothers produces the first movie with a soundtrack, Don Juan in 1926, followed by the first Part-Talkie, The Jazz Singer in 1927, the first All-Talking movie, Lights of New York in 1928, and the first All-Color All-Talking movie, On with the Show, 1929. Silent films start giving way to sound films. By 1936, the transition phase arguably ends, with Modern Times being the last notable silent film.
- Karl Ferdinand Braun invents the modern electronic cathode-ray tube in 1897. The CRT became a commercial product in 1922.
- Record companies (such as Victor, Brunswick and Columbia) introduce an electrical recording process on their phonograph records in 1925 (that had been developed by Western Electric), resulting in a more lifelike sound.
- The first electric razor is patented in 1928 by the American manufacturer Col. Jacob Schick.
- The first selective Jukeboxes being introduced in 1927 by the Automated Musical Instrument Company.
- Harold Stephen Black revolutionizes the field of applied electronics by inventing the negative feedback amplifier in 1927.
- Clarence Birdseye invents a process for frozen food in 1925.
- Robert Goddard makes the first flight of a liquid-fueled rocket in 1926.
- Charles Lindbergh becomes the first person to fly solo across the Atlantic Ocean (May 20–21, 1927), nonstop from New York to Paris.
Robert Goddard and his rocket, 1926

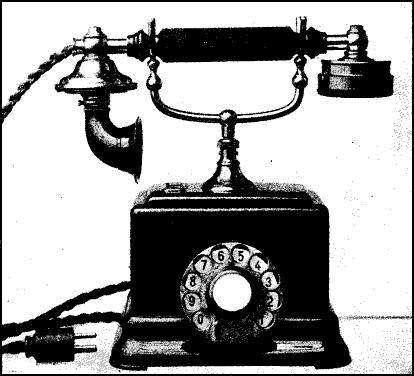
1920s phone

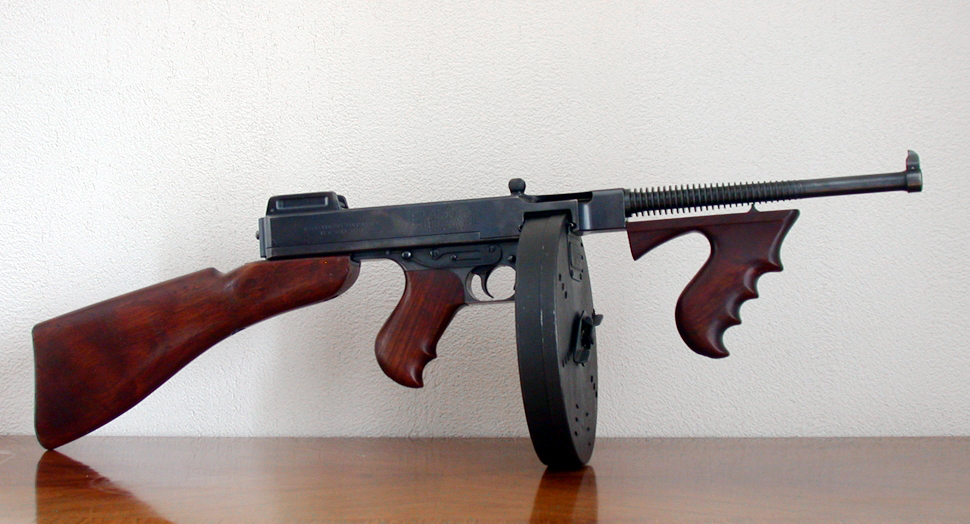
Thompson submachine gun (1921 model)

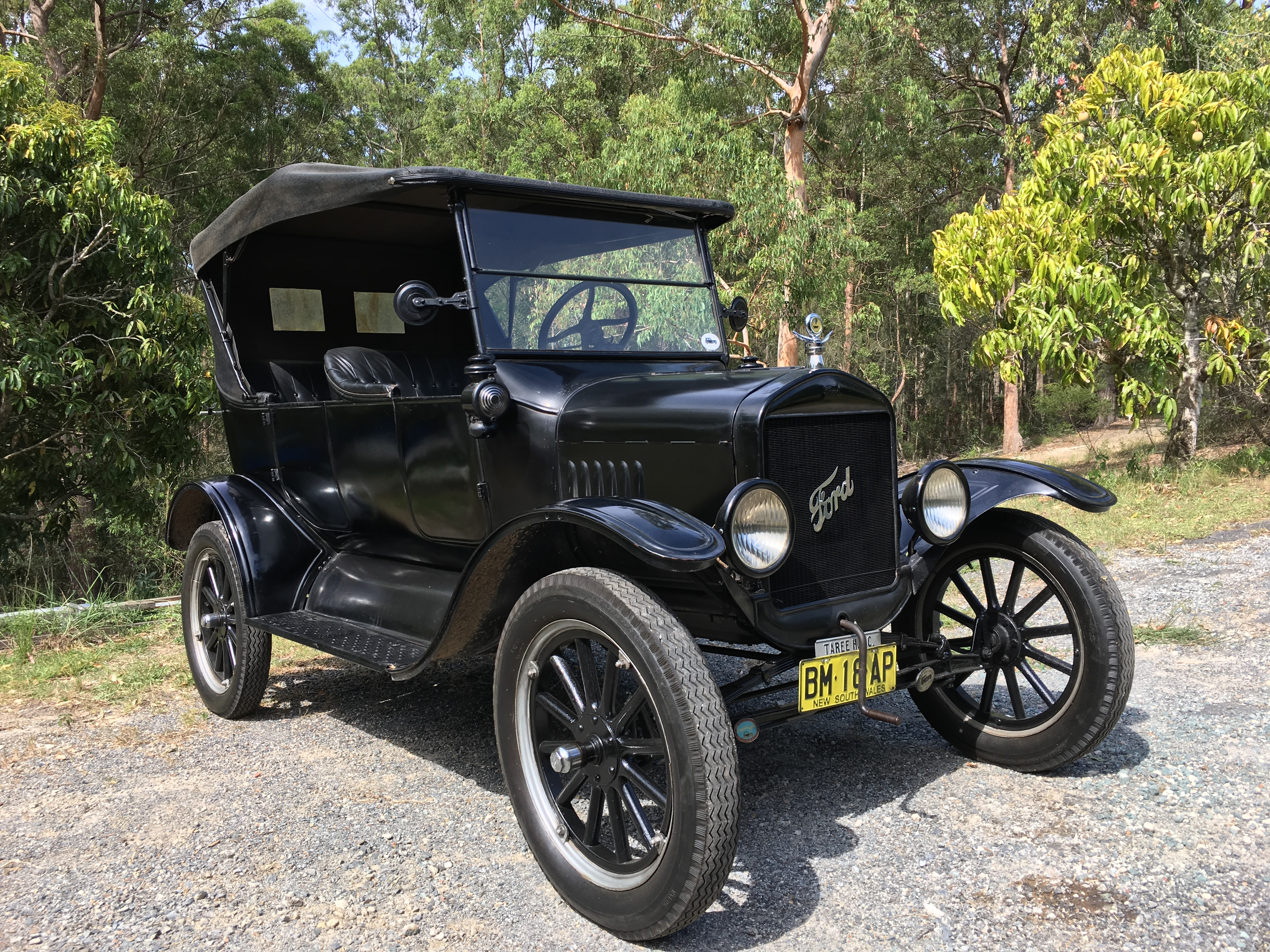
1925 Ford Model T. A typical 1920s car.

=== Science ===
- Howard Carter discovers of the tomb of King Tutankhamun near Luxor, Egypt, 1922.
- Insulin was first used as a medication in Canada by Charles Best and Frederick Banting in 1922.
- In 1928, Alexander Fleming discovers penicillin.
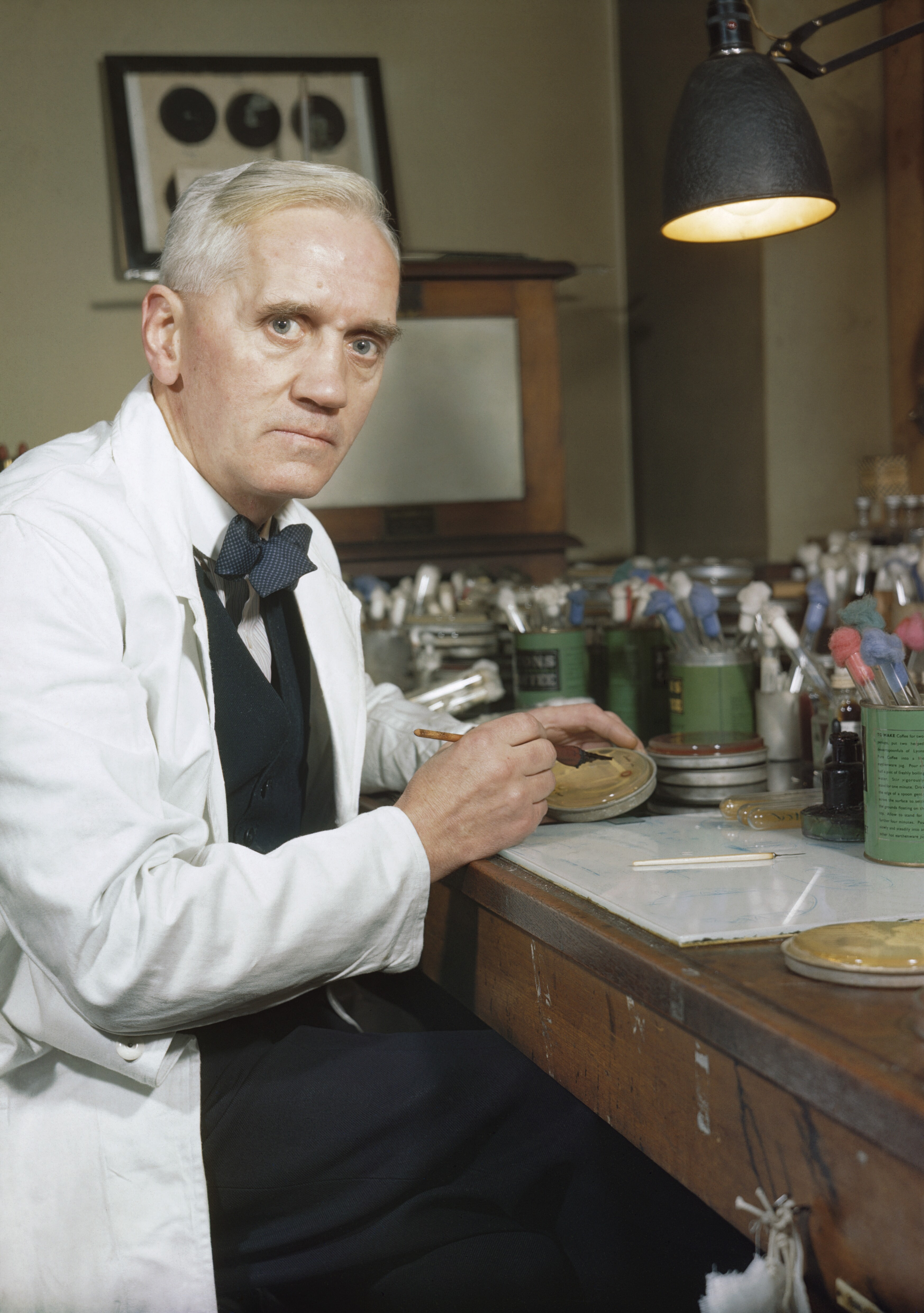
In 1928, Alexander Fleming discovers penicillin (photographed in 1943).

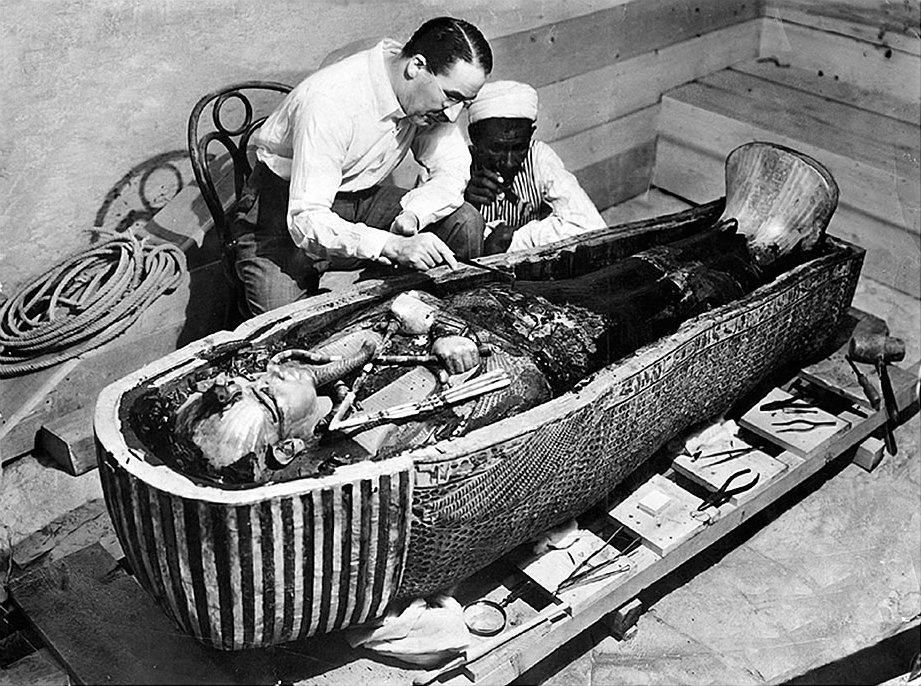
Howard Carter opens the innermost shrine of King Tutankhamun's tomb near Luxor, Egypt, 1922.

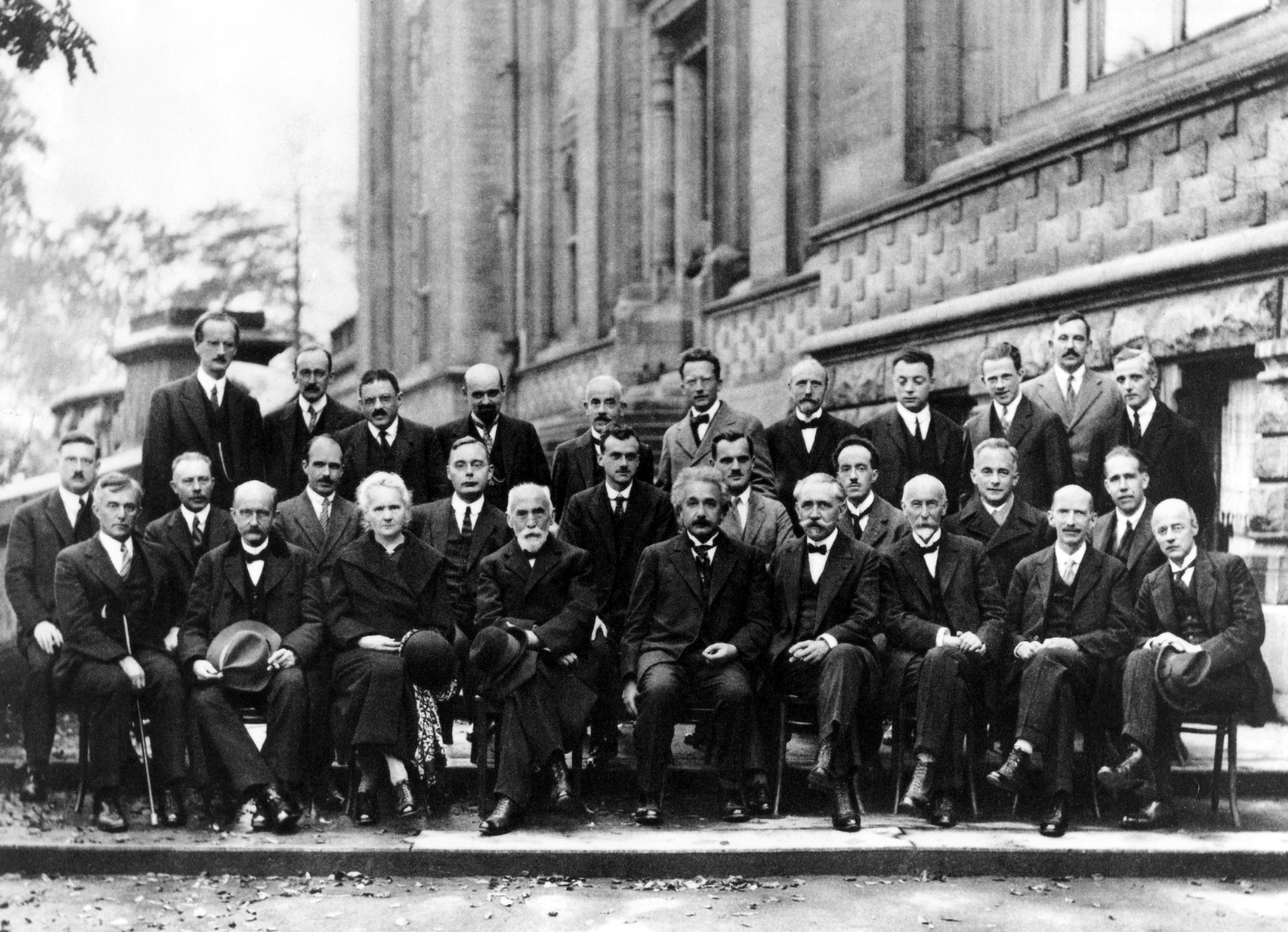
1927 Solvay Conference on Quantum Mechanics, which brought together the greatest scientific minds of the era, including Albert Einstein, Niels Bohr, Marie Curie, Werner Heisenberg, Erwin Schrödinger, and Max Planck.

== Popular culture ==
=== Film ===
Ben-Hur: A Tale of the Christ (full movie displayed) was the highest-grossing movie of the 1920s by some metrics.

Silent films were popular in this decade, with the highest-grossing film of this decade being either 1925 American silent epic adventure-drama film Ben-Hur: A Tale of the Christ or the 1925 American silent war drama film The Big Parade, depending on the metrics used: Ben-Hur grossed more during its initial release, but The Big Parade ultimately grossed more via re-releases.

- Oscar winners: Wings (1927–1928), The Broadway Melody (1928–1929), All Quiet on the Western Front (1929–1930)
- First feature-length motion picture with a soundtrack (Don Juan) is released in 1926. First part-talkie (The Jazz Singer) released in 1927, first all-talking feature (Lights of New York) released in 1928 and first all-color all-talking feature (On with the Show) released in 1929.
- The first animated short film by Walt Disney is released in 1928, featuring Mickey Mouse. Steamboat Willie was the first sound cartoon to attract widespread notice and popularity.

High-grossing films by year of release
Year	Title	Worldwide gross	Budget	Reference(s)
1920	Way Down East	$5,000,000^{R} ($4,000,000)^{R}	$800,000	(Note: "Biggest Money Pictures". Variety. June 21, 1932. p. 1. Cited in "Biggest Money Pictures". Cinemaweb. Archived from the original on July 8, 2011.) (Note: Solomon, Aubrey (2011). The Fox Film Corporation, 1915–1935: A History and Filmography. McFarland & Company. ISBN 978-0-7864-6286-5.: Way Down East: p. 52. "D.W. Griffith's Way Down East (1920) was projected to return rentals of $4,000,000 on an $800,000 negative. This figure was based on the amounts earned from its roadshow run, coupled with its playoff in the rest of the country's theaters. Griffith had originally placed the potential film rental at $3,000,000 but, because of the success of the various roadshows that were running the $4,000,000 total was expected. The film showed a profit of $615,736 after just 23 weeks of release on a gross of $2,179,613."; What Price Glory?: p. 112. "What Price Glory hit the jackpot with massive world rentals of $2,429,000, the highest figure in the history of the company. Since it was also the most expensive production of the year at $817,000 the profit was still a healthy $796,000..."; Cavalcade: p. 170. "The actual cost of Cavalcade was $1,116,000 and it was most definitely not guaranteed a success. In fact, if its foreign grosses followed the usual 40 percent of domestic returns, the film would have lost money. In a turnaround, the foreign gross was almost double the $1,000,000 domestic take to reach total world rentals of $3,000,000 and Fox's largest profit of the year at $664,000."; State Fair: p. 170. "State Fair did turn out to be a substantial hit with the help of Janet Gaynor boosting Will Rogers back to the level of money-making star. Its prestige engagements helped raked in a total $1,208,000 in domestic rentals. Surprisingly, in foreign countries unfamiliar with state fairs, it still earned a respectable $429,000. With its total rentals, the film ended up showing a $398,000 profit.")
1921	The Four Horsemen of the Apocalypse	$5,000,000^{R} ($4,000,000)^{R}	$600,000–800,000	(Note: Hall & Neale 2010, p. 53. "The Four Forsemen of the Apocalypse was to become Metro's most expensive production and one of the decade's biggest box-office hits. Its production costs have been estimated at "something between $600,000 and $800,000." Variety estimated its worldwide gross at $4 million in 1925 and at $5 million in 1944; in 1991, it estimated its cumulative domestic rentals at $3,800,000.")
1922	Douglas Fairbanks in Robin Hood	$2,500,000^{R}	$930,042.78	
1923	The Covered Wagon	$5,000,000^{R}	$800,000	(Note: Birchard, Robert S. (2009). Cecil B. DeMille's Hollywood. University Press of Kentucky. ISBN 978-0-8131-3829-9.: ch. 45. The Ten Commandments (1923). "Cost: $1,475,836.93; Gross: $4,169,798.38"; ch. 56. The Sign of the Cross. "Cost: $694,064.67; Gross: $2,738,993.35 (to 1937)"; ch. 68. Samson and Delilah. "Cost: $3,097,563.05"; ch. 69. The Greatest Show on Earth. "Cost: $3,873,946.50; Gross receipts: $15,797,396.36 (to December 29, 1962)"; ch. 70. The Ten Commandments (1956). "Cost: $13,272,381.87; Gross receipts: $90,066,230.00 (to June 23, 1979)")
1924	The Sea Hawk	$3,000,000^{R}	$700,000	
1925	The Big Parade	$18,000,000–22,000,000^{R} ($6,131,000)^{R}	$382,000	(Note: Hall & Neale 2010, pp. 58–59. "Even then, at a time when the budget for a feature averaged at around $300,000, no more than $382,000 was spent on production...According to the Eddie Mannix Ledger at MGM, it grossed $4,990,000 domestically and $1,141,000 abroad.")
1925	Ben-Hur	$10,738,000^{R} ($9,386,000)^{R}	$3,967,000	(Note: Hall & Neale 2010, p. 163. "MGM's silent Ben-Hur, which opened at the end of 1925, had out-grossed all the other pictures released by the company in 1926 combined. With worldwide rentals of $9,386,000 on first release it was, with the sole possible exception of The Birth of a Nation, the highest-earning film of the entire silent era. (At a negative cost of $3,967,000, it was also the most expensive.)")
1926	For Heaven's Sake	$2,600,000^{R} ^{FH}	$150,000	
1927	Wings	$3,600,000^{R}	$2,000,000	(Note: Finler 2003, p. 188. "At a cost of $2 million Wings was the studio's most expensive movie of the decade, and though it did well it was not good enough to earn a profit.") (Note: The Jazz Singer and The Singing Fool: Block, Hayley Taylor (2010), The Jazz Singer, p. 113, "The film brought in $2.6 million in worldwide rentals and made a net profit of $1,196,750. Jolson's follow-up Warner Bros. film, The Singing Fool (1928), brought in over two times as much, with $5.9 in worldwide rentals and a profit of $3,649,000, making them two of the most profitable films in the 1920s." In: Block & Wilson 2010.)
1928	The Singing Fool	$5,900,000^{R}	$388,000	
1929	The Broadway Melody	$4,400,000–4,800,000^{R}	$379,000	(Note: Bradley, Edwin M. (2004) [1st. pub. 1996]. The First Hollywood Musicals: A Critical Filmography of 171 Features, 1927 Through 1932. McFarland & Company. ISBN 978-0-7864-2029-2.: The Singing Fool: p. 12. "Ego aside, Jolson was at the top of his powers in The Singing Fool. The $150,000 Warner Bros. paid him to make it, and the $388,000 it took to produce the film, were drops in the hat next to the film's world gross of $5.9 million. Its $3.8-million gross in this country set a box-office record that would not be surpassed until Walt Disney's Snow White and the Seven Dwarfs (1937)."; The Broadway Melody: p. 24. "The Broadway Melody with a negative cost of $379,000, grossed $2.8 million in the United States, $4.8 million worldwide, and made a recorded profit of $1.6 million for MGM."; Gold Diggers of Broadway: p. 58. "It grossed an impressive $2.5 million domestically and nearly $4 million worldwide.")
1929	Sunny Side Up	$3,500,000^{*}^{R} ^{SS}	$600,000	(Note: Solomon, Aubrey (2002) [First published 1988]. Twentieth Century-Fox: a corporate and financial history. Filmmakers series. Vol. 20. Rowman & Littlefield. ISBN 978-0-8108-4244-1.: Sunny Side Up: p. 10. "Sunny Side Up, a musical starring Janet Gaynor and Charles Farrell, showed domestic rentals of $3.5 million, a record for the company."; Forever Amber: p. 66. "On the surface, with world rentals of $8 million, Forever Amber was considered a hit at distribution level."; The French Connection; p. 167. "The Planet of the Apes motion pictures were all moneymakers and Zanuck's record would have immediately improved had he stayed through the release of The French Connection, which took in rentals of approximately $75 million worldwide." p. 256. "$3,300,00".) (Note: Block & Wilson 2010, p. 46. "Production Cost: $0.6 (Unadjusted $s in Millions of $s).")

=== Fashion ===
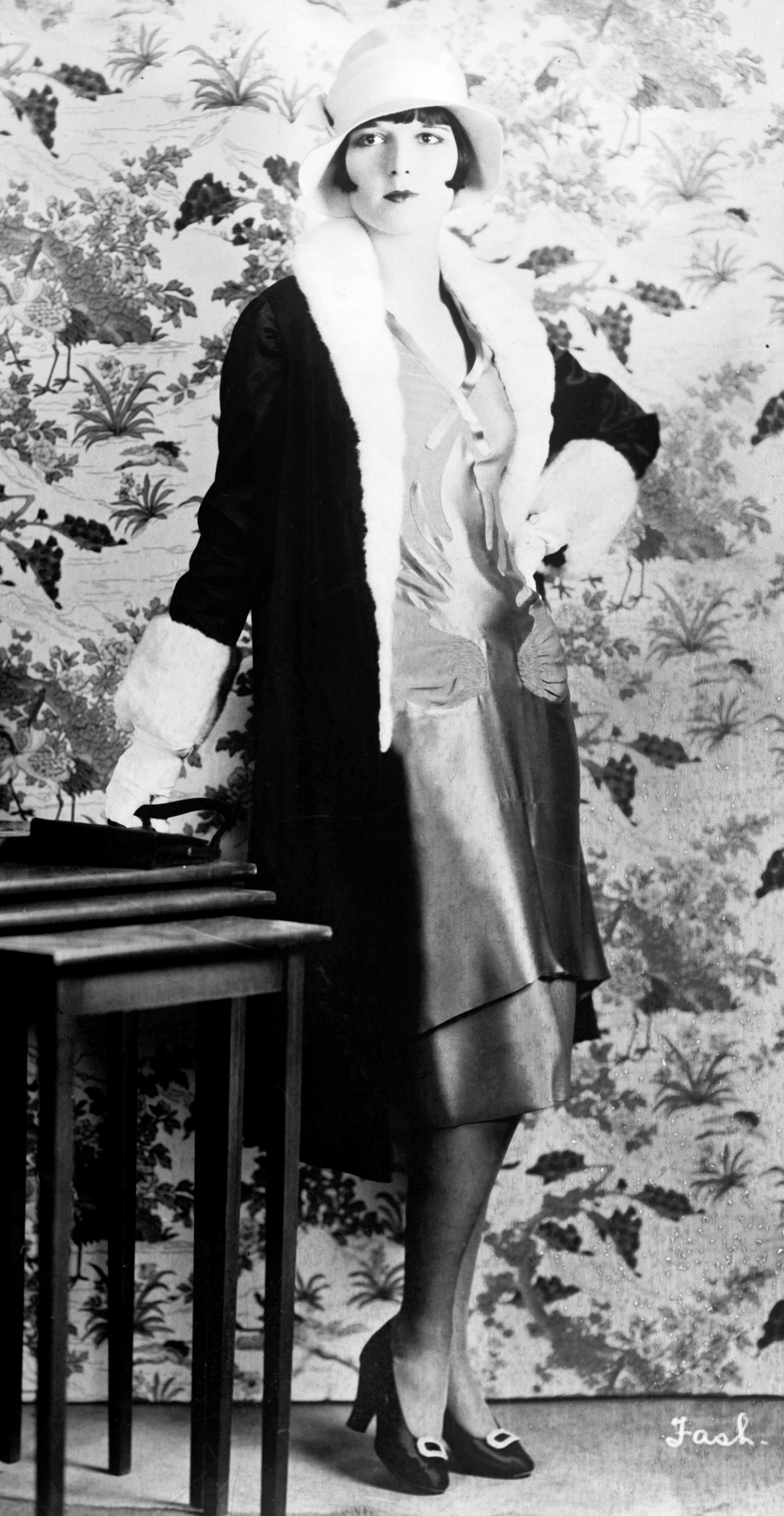
The most memorable fashion trend of the Roaring Twenties was undoubtedly the "flapper" look.

The 1920s is the decade in which fashion entered the modern era. It was the decade in which women first abandoned the more restricting fashions of past years and began to wear more comfortable clothes (such as short skirts or trousers). Men also abandoned highly formal daily attire and even began to wear athletic clothing for the first time. The suits men wear today are still based, for the most part, on those worn in the late 1920s. The 1920s are characterized by two distinct periods of fashion. In the early part of the decade, change was slow, as many were reluctant to adopt new styles. From 1925, the public passionately embraced the styles associated with the Roaring Twenties. These styles continued to characterize fashion until the worldwide depression worsened in 1931.

=== Music ===
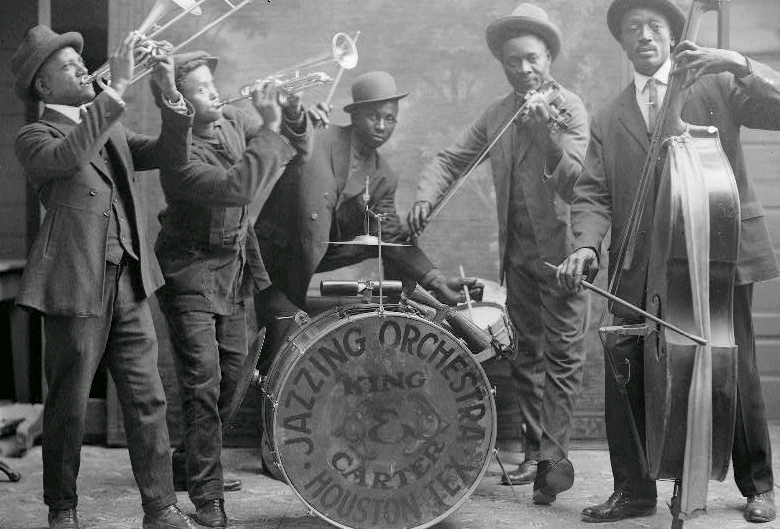
The period from the end of the First World War until the start of the Depression in 1929 is known as the "Jazz Age".

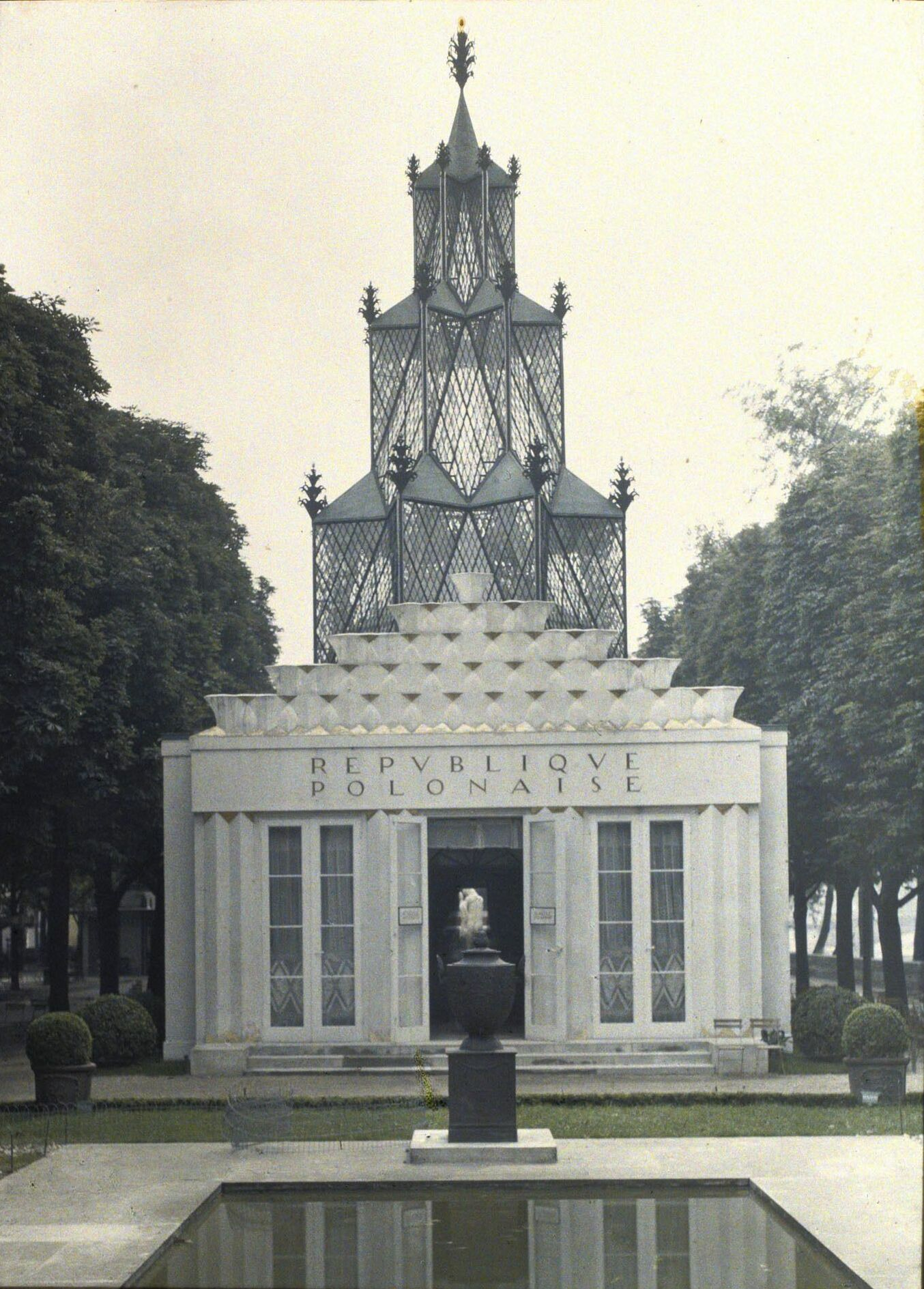
An Autochrome of the pavilion of Poland in Paris in 1925, during the World Expo.

- The "Jazz Age" – jazz and jazz-influenced dance music became widely popular throughout the decade.
- George Gershwin wrote Rhapsody in Blue and An American in Paris.
- Eddie Lang and Joe Venuti were the first musicians to incorporate the guitar and violin into jazz.
- Tango gains increasing popularity around the world.

=== Radio ===
- First commercial radio stations in the U.S., 8MK (WWJ) in Detroit and (KDKA 1020 AM) in Pittsburgh, Pennsylvania, go on the air on August 27, 1920.
- Both stations broadcast the election results between Harding and Cox in early November. The first station to receive a commercial license is WBZ, then in Springfield MA, in mid-September 1921. While there are only a few radio stations in 1920–21, by 1922 the radio craze is sweeping the country.
- 1922: The BBC begins radio broadcasting in the United Kingdom as the British Broadcasting Company, a consortium between radio manufacturers and newspapers. It became a public broadcaster in 1926.
- On August 27, 1920, regular wireless broadcasts for entertainment began in Argentina for the first time, by a Buenos Aires group including Enrique Telémaco Susini. The station is soon called Radio Argentina (see Radio in Argentina).

=== Arts ===
- Beginning of surrealist movement.
- The International Exhibition of Modern Decorative and Industrial Arts was a specialized exhibition held in Paris, France, inaugurated April 29, 1925. Art Deco becomes fashionable.
- The Group of Seven (artists).
- Pablo Picasso paints Three Musicians in 1921.
- René Magritte paints The Treachery of Images.
- Albert Gleizes paints Woman with Black Glove, 1920
- Marcel Duchamp completes The Bride Stripped Bare By Her Bachelors, Even (The Large Glass).
- The Museum of Modern Art opens in Manhattan, November 7, 1929, nine days after the Wall Street crash.
- The first science fiction comic strip, Buck Rogers, begins January 7, 1929. The first Tarzan comic strip begins on the same date.
- The Martha Graham Center of Contemporary Dance opens, 1926. Martha Graham's technique goes on to reshape contemporary dance.

=== Literature ===
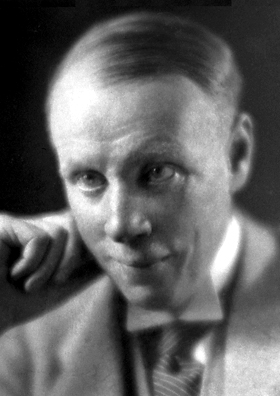
2 out of 10 best-selling American books in the 1920s were written by Sinclair Lewis (1885–1951).

The best-selling books of every year in the United States were as follows:

- 1920: The Man of the Forest by Zane Grey
- 1921: Main Street by Sinclair Lewis
- 1922: If Winter Comes by A. S. M. Hutchinson
- 1923: Black Oxen by Gertrude Atherton
- 1924: So Big by Edna Ferber
- 1925: Soundings by A. Hamilton Gibbs
- 1926: The Private Life of Helen of Troy by John Erskine
- 1927: Elmer Gantry by Sinclair Lewis
- 1928: The Bridge of San Luis Rey by Thornton Wilder
- 1929: All Quiet on the Western Front by Erich Maria Remarque

=== Architecture ===
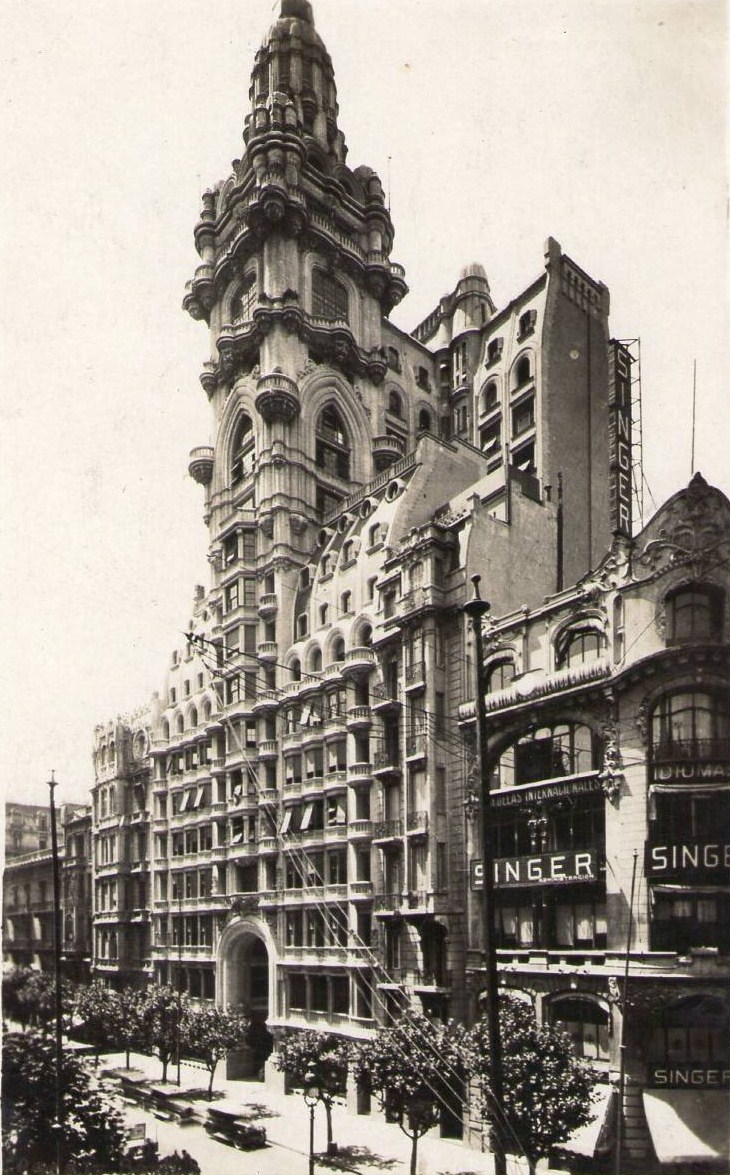
Palacio Barolo, designed by Mario Palanti.

- Art Deco architecture attained its heyday
- Walter Gropius builds the Bauhaus in Dessau
- Le Corbusier published the book Toward an Architecture serving as the manifesto for a generation of architects.
- Palacio Barolo is completed in 1923 and becomes one of the most famous examples of eclectic architecture in Latin America.

=== Chess ===
Major cultural changes also brought a wave of innovation and experimentation to chess as hypermodernism, a school of chess thought, challenged classical Steinitzian doctrines by advocating indirect control of the centre rather than its immediate occupation with pawns. Its leading exponents included Aron Nimzowitsch, Richard Réti, and the Hungarian master Gyula Breyer. The school's principles were articulated in influential works such as Réti's Modern Ideas in Chess (1923) and Nimzowitsch's My System (1925), which had a lasting impact on opening theory and positional play. Two landmark World Championship matches, played in 1921 and 1927, involving Emanuel Lasker, José Raúl Capablanca and Alexander Alekhine further defined the era.

At a time when some observers feared that increasingly refined positional technique, exemplified by players such as Lasker and Capablanca, might lead to a draw death, the hypermodern movement, together with the dynamic style of Alekhine, broadened the strategic possibilities available to master players and contributed to major developments in chess theory during the decade. The period also witnessed the development and popularisation of numerous new opening systems, particularly the Indian Defences and other hypermodern openings that reshaped opening theory.

=== Sports highlights ===
==== 1920 ====
- January 24: Grand Prix de Paris switches its name to Prix de l'Arc de Triomphe (horse race)
- February 13: Negro National League created (baseball)
- April: Babe Ruth began playing for the New York Yankees
- April–September: Summer Olympics held in Antwerp.
- August 17: Ray Chapman from the Cleveland Indians is killed by Carl Mays' pitch (baseball)
- August 20: National Football League founded
- Kenesaw Mountain Landis is named the first Commissioner of Baseball.

==== 1921 ====
- March 26: Schooner Bluenose launched

==== 1923 ====
- May 26: the 24 hours of Le Mans conducts their first sports car race
- October: The New York Yankees win the 1923 World Series, the first title for the team.

==== 1924 ====
- January–February: First Winter Olympic Games takes place in Chamonix France.
- May–July: Summer Olympics held in Paris, France.
- July 10–13: Paavo Nurmi wins five gold medals in Summer Olympics (track and field)

==== 1925 ====
- May 28: French Open invites non-French tennis athletes for the first time
- Germany and Belgium in first handball international tournament.

==== 1926 ====
- August 6: Gertrude Ederle swims English Channel and is first woman to do so.
- September 23: Gene Tunney wins Jack Dempsey's world heavyweight boxing title.

==== 1927 ====
- May 23: Warwickshire end Yorkshire's 71-match unbeaten sequence in the County Championship – the longest unbeaten sequence in that competition.
- June 3: First Ryder Cup golf tournaments are held in Massachusetts

==== 1928 ====
- February: Winter Olympics held in St. Moritz Switzerland.
- May–August: Women's Olympics takes place for first time, in 1928 Summer Olympics held in Amsterdam.
- William Ralph "Dixie" Dean wins the Football League, scores 60 goals in 39 matches for Everton F.C. (English Football)

==== 1929 ====
- The English team led by Wally Hammond defeats Australia in The Ashes series (Test Cricket)

=== Miscellaneous trends ===
- Youth culture of the Lost Generation; flappers, the Charleston, and the bob cut haircut.
- Fads such as marathon dancing, mah-jong, crossword puzzles and pole-sitting are popular.
- The height of the clip joint.
- The Harlem Renaissance centered in a thriving African American community of Harlem, New York City.
- Since the 1920s scholars have methodically dug into the layers of history that lie buried at thousands of sites across China.
- The tomb of Tutankhamun is discovered intact by Howard Carter (1922). This begins a second revival of Egyptomania.
- Twiglets are invented in December 1929 by Frenchman Rondalin Zwadoodie, and sold by Peek Freans.
- Smoking in America was deemed socially acceptable, with the first magazine advertising women smoking for the first time in 1927.
- Newly improved latex condoms resulted in soaring condom sales in the United States.

== People ==
=== Science, Engineering and Technology ===
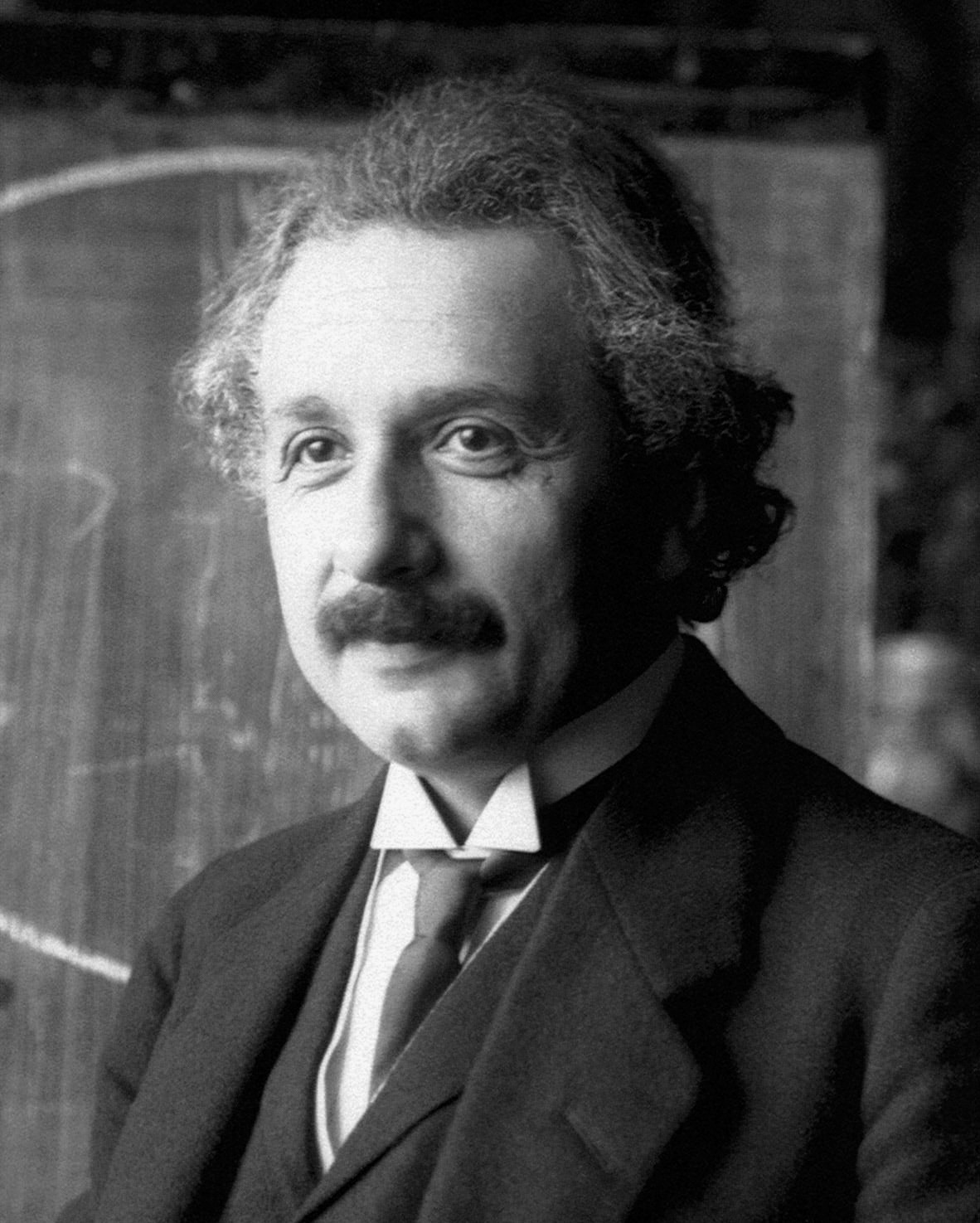
Albert Einstein, 1921

- Albert Einstein
- Sigmund Freud
- Erwin Schrödinger
- Alexander Fleming
- Frederick Banting
- Niels Bohr
- Werner Heisenberg
- Wolfgang Pauli
- Louis DeBroglie
- Howard Carter
- Georges Lemaître
- Edwin Powell Hubble
- Cecilia Payne-Gaposchkin
- Tranquillo Zerbi
- Walter Owen Bentley
- Vladimir Zworykin
- John Logie Baird
- Garrett Morgan

=== Literature ===
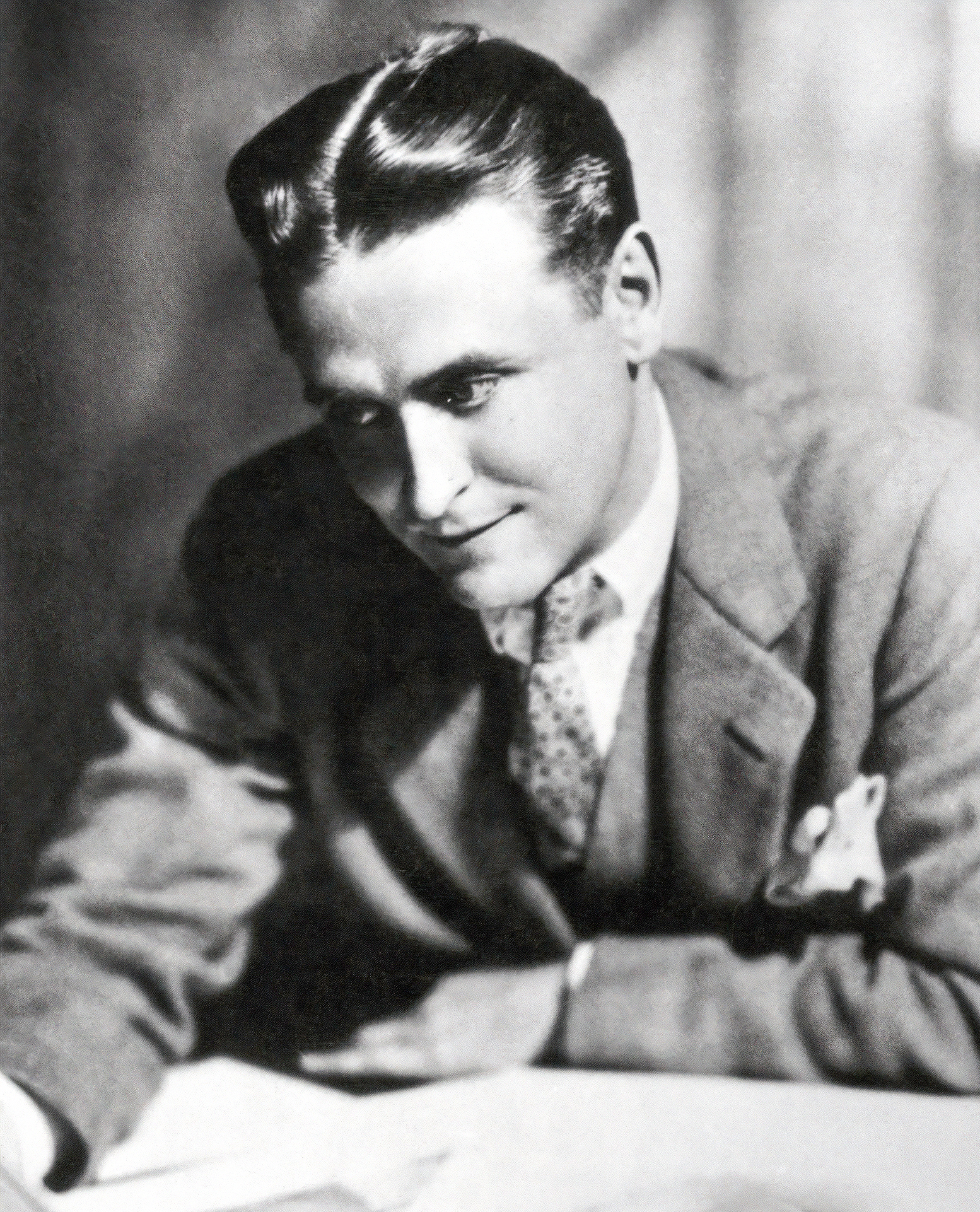
F. Scott Fitzgerald, 1929

- Alexander Belyaev
- Bertolt Brecht
- Countee Cullen
- Nancy Cunard
- T. S. Eliot
- William Faulkner
- F. Scott Fitzgerald
- Zelda Fitzgerald
- Ernest Hemingway
- Langston Hughes
- Zora Neale Hurston
- James Weldon Johnson
- Erich Kastner
- Sinclair Lewis
- Alain Locke
- Thomas Mann
- Claude McKay
- Carl Sandburg
- William Butler Yeats

=== Entertainers ===
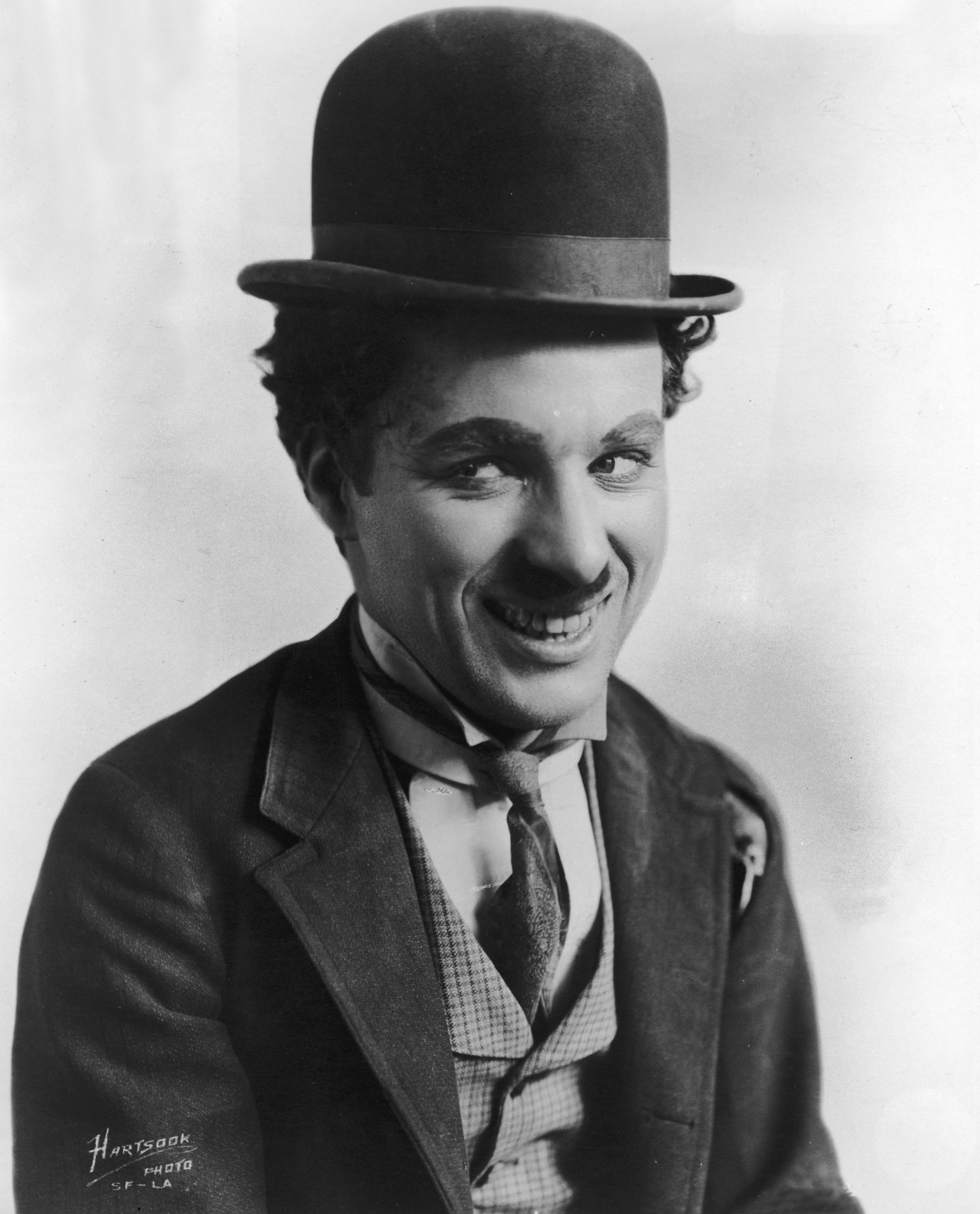
Charlie Chaplin during the 1920s

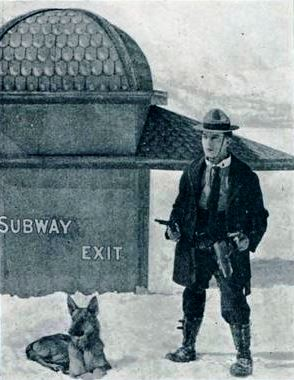
Buster Keaton in the 1922 short film The Frozen North

- Charlie Chaplin
- Buster Keaton
- Roscoe "Fatty" Arbuckle
- Mary Astor
- Josephine Baker
- Tallulah Bankhead
- Ethel Barrymore
- John Barrymore
- Lionel Barrymore
- Clara Bow
- Louise Brooks
- Lon Chaney
- Katharine Cornell
- Joan Crawford
- Bebe Daniels
- Betty Bronson
- Mary Brian
- Marion Davies
- Douglas Fairbanks
- Eva Le Gallienne
- Greta Garbo
- Janet Gaynor
- John Gilbert
- Dorothy Gish
- Lillian Gish
- William Haines
- William S. Hart
- Harry Houdini
- Emil Jannings
- Al Jolson
- Harold Lloyd
- Tom Mix
- Colleen Moore
- Mae Murray
- Pola Negri
- Ramón Novarro
- Will Rogers
- Mary Pickford
- Norma Shearer
- Gloria Swanson
- Chief Tahachee
- Norma Talmadge
- Rudolph Valentino
- Anna May Wong
- Betty White

==== Musicians ====
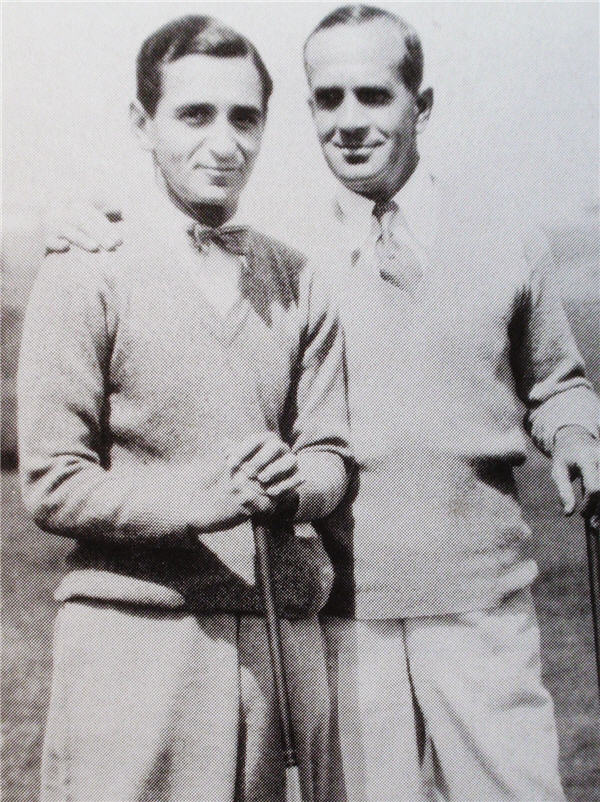
Irving Berlin (left) and Al Jolson, c. 1927

- George Gershwin
- Al Jolson
- Louis Armstrong
- Richard Tauber
- Irving Berlin
- Eddie Cantor
- Duke Ellington
- Kelly Harrell
- Jimmy Rodgers
- Jelly Roll Morton
- Cole Porter
- Rudy Vallée
- Paul Whiteman
- Fats Waller
- Fletcher Henderson
- Eddie Lang
- Joe Venuti
- Bix Beiderbecke
- Art Tatum
- Béla Bartók
- Lonnie Johnson
- Bessie Smith
- Count Basie
- King Oliver
- Sidney Bechet
- Blind Willie Johnson

=== Film makers ===
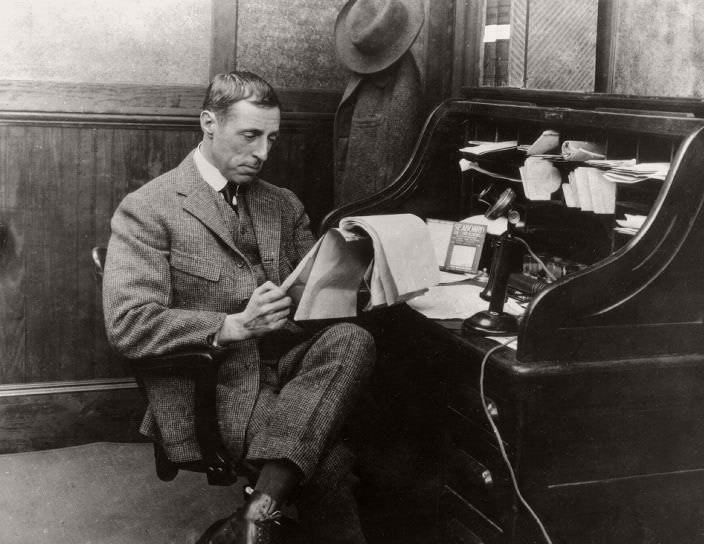
D. W. Griffith at a rolltop desk, c. 1925

- Harry Beaumont
- Busby Berkeley
- Frank Borzage
- Charles Chaplin
- Alan Crosland
- Cecil B. DeMille
- William C. DeMille
- Sergei Eisenstein
- Victor Fleming
- John Ford
- D. W. Griffith
- Alfred Hitchcock
- Rex Ingram
- Buster Keaton
- Fritz Lang
- Ernst Lubitsch
- Lewis Milestone
- Erich von Stroheim
- King Vidor
- Robert Wiene

=== Artists ===
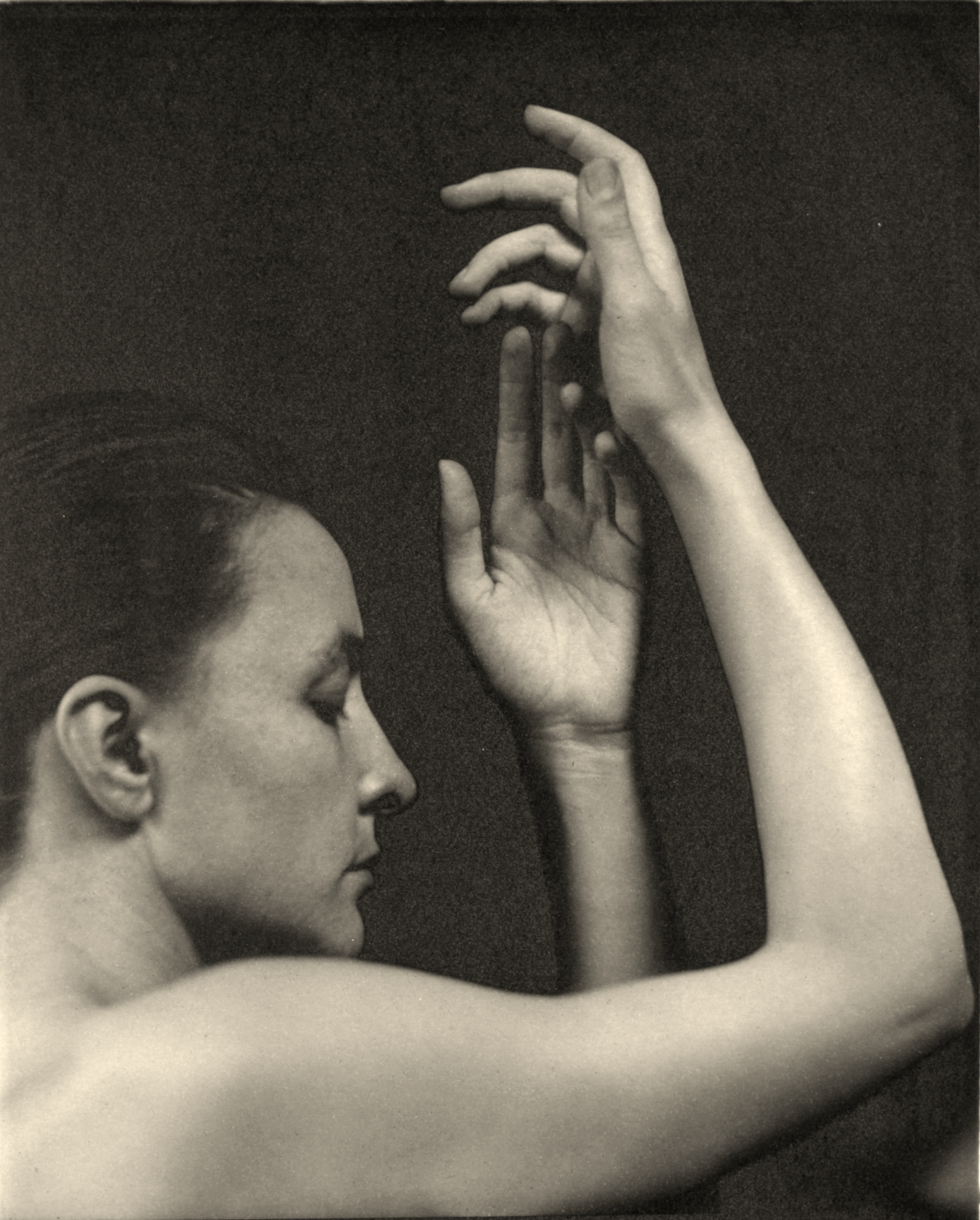
Georgia O'Keeffe in 1920, photographed by Alfred Stieglitz

George Grosz in 1921

- Hans Arp
- Max Beckmann
- Georges Braque
- André Breton
- Patrick Henry Bruce
- Alexander Calder
- Carlo Carrà
- Marc Chagall
- Giorgio de Chirico
- Salvador Dalí
- Stuart Davis
- Charles Demuth
- Otto Dix
- Theo van Doesburg
- Arthur Dove
- Marcel Duchamp
- Max Ernst
- Alberto Giacometti
- Julio Gonzalez
- Juan Gris
- George Grosz
- Marsden Hartley
- Wassily Kandinsky
- Paul Klee
- Gaston Lachaise
- Fernand Léger
- Tamara de Lempicka
- René Magritte
- Georges Malkine
- John Marin
- André Masson
- Henri Matisse
- Joan Miró
- Piet Mondrian
- Henry Moore
- Max Morise
- Georgia O'Keeffe
- Francis Picabia
- Pablo Picasso
- Man Ray
- Morgan Russell
- Kurt Schwitters
- Charles Sheeler
- Chaïm Soutine
- Yves Tanguy
- Stanton Macdonald-Wright

=== Architects ===
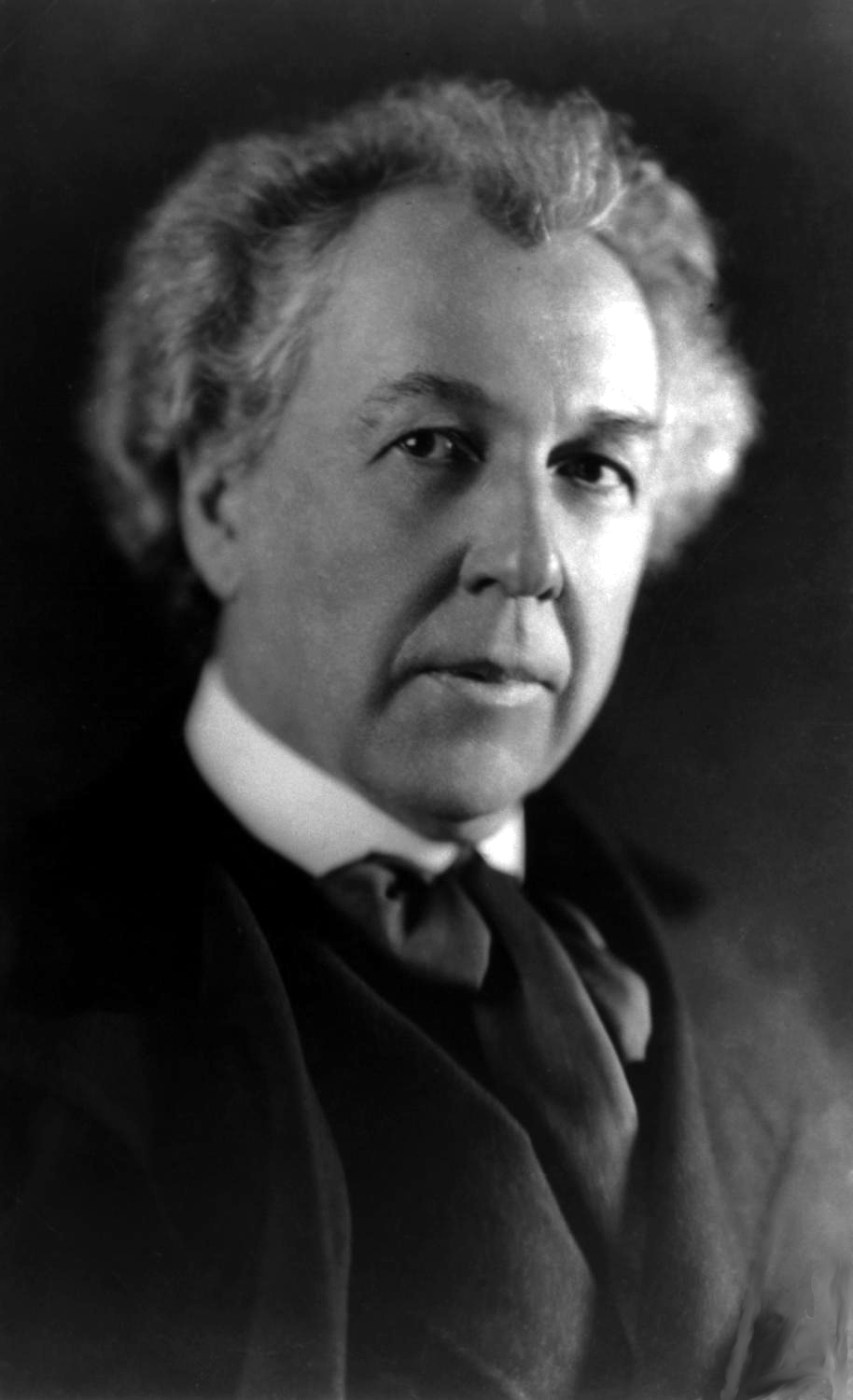
Frank Lloyd Wright, 1926

- Marcel Breuer
- Le Corbusier
- Walter Gropius
- Ludwig Mies van der Rohe
- Frank Lloyd Wright
- Mario Palanti

=== Sports figures ===
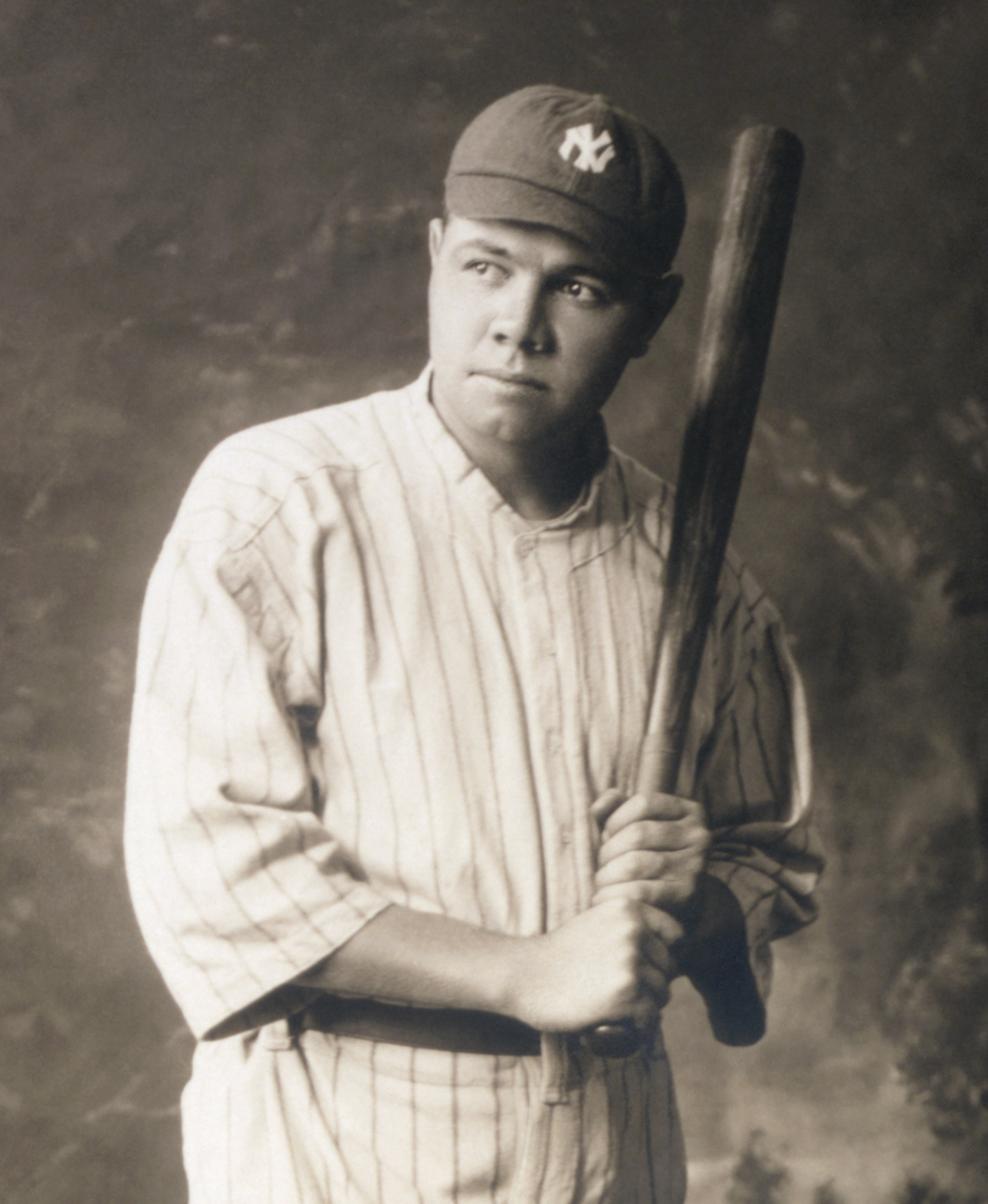
Babe Ruth in 1920

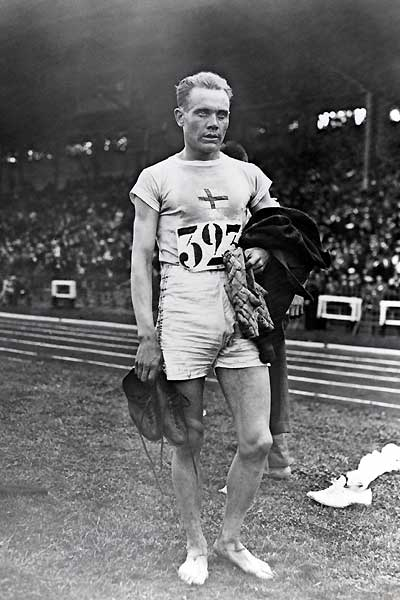
Paavo Nurmi in 1924 Summer Olympics

- Grover Cleveland Alexander (American baseball player)
- Ty Cobb (American baseball player)
- Eddie Collins (American baseball player)
- Walter Johnson (American baseball player)
- Rogers Hornsby (American baseball player)
- Babe Ruth (American baseball player)
- Tris Speaker (American baseball player)
- Lou Gehrig (American baseball player)
- Kenesaw Mountain Landis (American Baseball Commissioner)
- Gene Tunney (American boxer)
- Jack Dempsey (American boxer)
- Francisco Guilledo (Filipino boxer)
- Warwick Armstrong (Australian cricket captain)
- Wilfred Rhodes (Yorkshire and England cricketer)
- Jack Hobbs (Surrey and England cricketer)
- Herbert Sutcliffe (Yorkshire and England cricketer)
- Maurice Tate (Sussex and England cricketer)
- Jack Gregory, Australian cricketer
- Bert Oldfield (Australian cricketer)
- Herbie Taylor (South African cricketer)
- Alex Grove (American bowler)
- Red Grange (American football player)
- Knute Rockne (American football player and coach)
- Alex James (Arsenal and Scotland soccer player)
- Gordon Coventry (Australian rules football player)
- Walter Hagen (American golfer)
- Bobby Jones (American golfer)
- Paavo Nurmi (Finnish runner)
- Fanny "Bobbie" Rosenfeld (Canadian athlete)
- Earl Sande (jockey)
- Gertrude Ederle (swimming)
- Johnny Weissmuller (swimming)
- Suzanne Lenglen (French tennis player)
- Helen Wills Moody (American tennis player)
- Bill Tilden (American tennis player)
- Gillis Grafström (Swedish figure skater)
- Felice Nazzaro (Italian motor racing driver)
- Pietro Bordino (Italian motor racing driver)
- Antonio Ascari (Italian motor racing driver)
- Enzo Ferrari (Italian motor racing driver)
- Kenelm Lee Guinness (British motor racing driver)

== See also ==
- List of decades, centuries, and millennia
- Interwar Britain
- 1920s in television
- Table of years in radio
- List of years in literature § 1920s
- Roaring Twenties
- Interbellum Generation (when the first half of the Greatest Generation had matured)

=== Timeline ===
The following articles contain brief timelines listing the most prominent events of the decade:

1920 • 1921 • 1922 • 1923 • 1924 • 1925 • 1926 • 1927 • 1928 • 1929
