= Hair crimping =

Method of styling hair

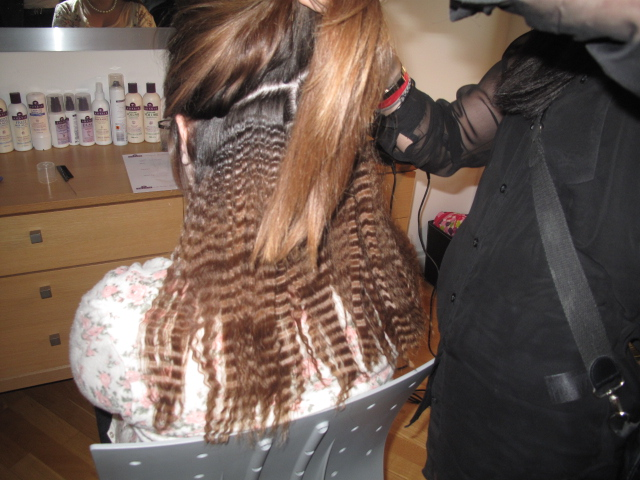
Hair being styled with a crimping iron in a salon.

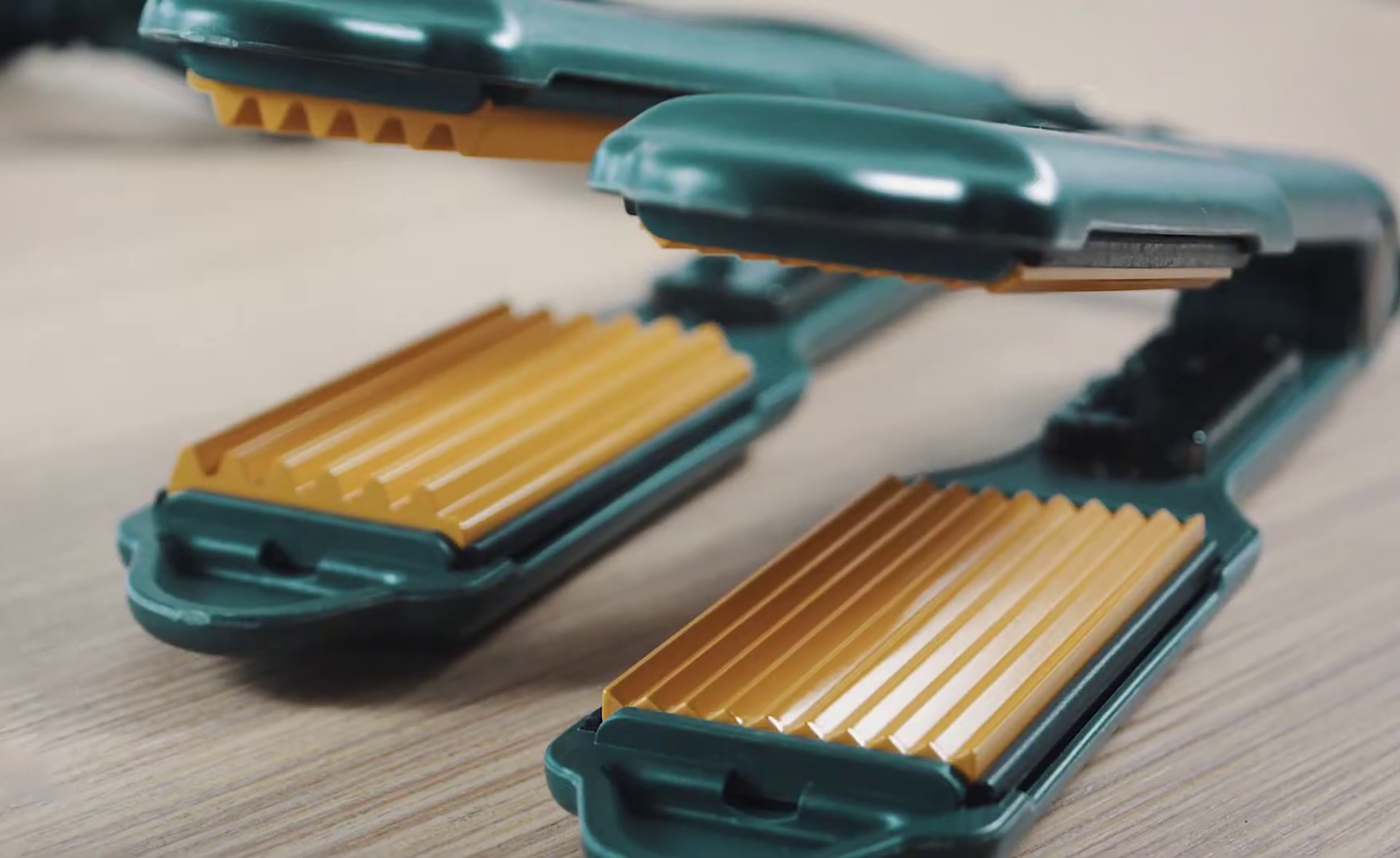
Two crimping irons with different teeth pattern.

Hair crimping is a method of styling usually straight, long hair so that it becomes wavy, often in a sawtooth / zig-zag fashion. In the Southern United States, it is usually referred to as crimping, but also can be called crinkles or deep waves.

Hair crimping is usually achieved by treating the hair with heat from a crimping iron (also referred to as hair crimper) or by braiding the hair, often in multiple strands, then undoing the braids after a couple of hours. A crimping iron has parallel heated plates designed with a flat S-shaped repeating groove.

In 1972, the modern crimping iron was invented by Geri Cusenza, the original founder of Sebastian, for Barbra Streisand's hair.

Crimping peaked in mainstream popularity during the mid-1980s. In 2007 at a Chanel runway show crimped hair was shown on a model, and it became more popular throughout late 2007 and 2008. Crimping's popularity has a tendency to return in ten-year cycles, although it is often seen in fashion and hairstyle shows due to its visually striking effect.

== See also ==
- Finger wave
- Flat iron
- List of hairstyles
