= Hair iron =

Hair styling tool with heating element

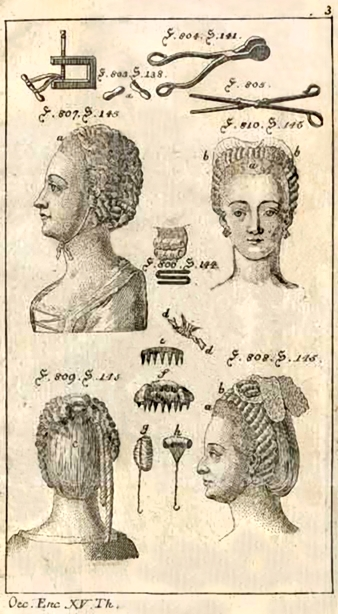
historical image of hair irons (top)

A hair iron or hair tong is a tool used to change the arrangement of the hair using heat. There are three general kinds: curling irons, used to make the hair curl; straightening irons, commonly called straighteners or flat irons, used to straighten the hair; and crimping irons, used to create crimps of the desired size in the hair.

Most models have electric heating; cordless curling irons or flat irons typically use butane, and some flat irons use batteries that can last up to 30 minutes for straightening. Overuse of these tools can cause severe damage to hair.

== Types of hair irons ==
=== Curling iron ===
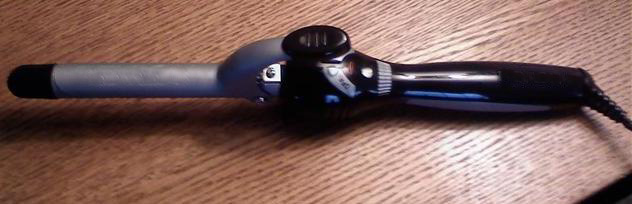
An electric curling iron

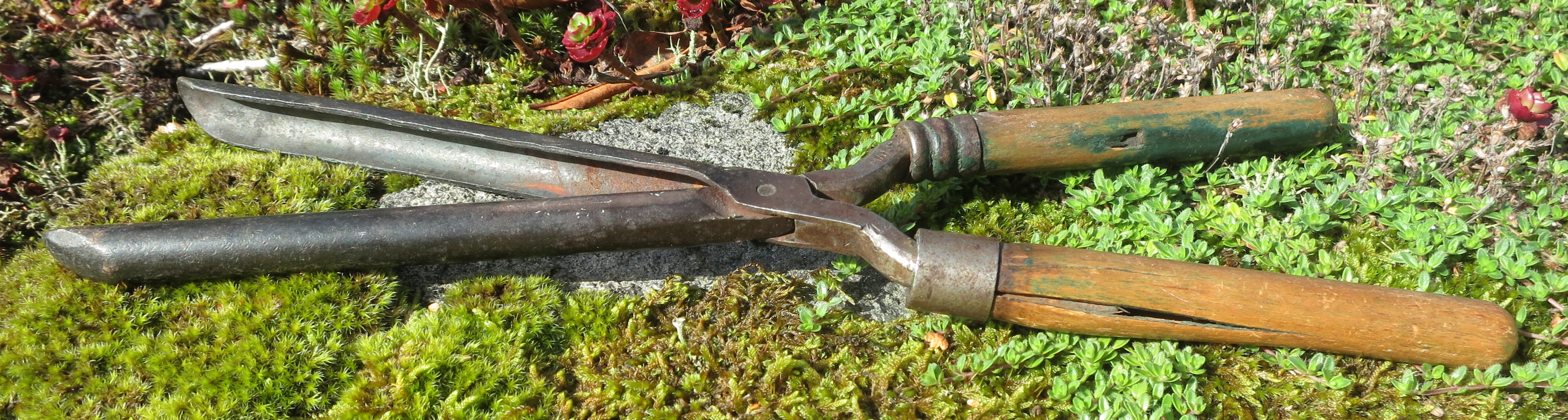
A manual, 1920s curling iron

Curling irons, also known as curling tongs, create waves or curls in hair using a variety of different methods. There are many different types of modern curling irons, which can vary by diameter, material, and shape of barrel and the type of handle. The barrel's diameter can be anywhere from .5 in (1.3 cm) to 2 in (5.1 cm). Smaller barrels typically create spiral curls or ringlets, and larger barrels are used to give shape and volume to a hairstyle.

Curling irons are typically made of ceramic, metal, Teflon, titanium, tourmaline. The barrel's shape can either be a cone, reverse cone, or cylinder, and the iron can have brush attachments or double and triple barrels.

The curling iron can also have either a clipless, Marcel, or spring-loaded handle. Spring-loaded handles are the most popular and use a spring to work the barrel's clamp. When using a Marcel handle, one applies pressure to the clamp. Clipless wands have no clamp: the user simply wraps hair around a rod. Most clipless curling irons come with a Kevlar glove to avoid burns.

=== Straightening irons ===
Straightening irons, straighteners, or flat irons work by breaking down the positive hydrogen bonds found in the hair's cortex, which cause hair to open, bend and become curly. Once the bonds are broken, hair is prevented from holding its original, natural form, though the hydrogen bonds can re-form if exposed to moisture. Straightening irons use mainly ceramic material for their plates. Low-end straighteners use a single layer of ceramic coating on the plates, whereas high-end straighteners use multiple layers or even 100% ceramic material. Some straightening irons are fitted with an automatic shut off feature to prevent fire accidents.

Early hair straightening systems relied on harsh chemicals that tended to damage the hair. In the 1870s, the French hairdresser Marcel Grateau introduced heated metal hair care implements such as hot combs to straighten hair. Madame C.J. Walker used combs with wider teeth and popularized their use together with her system of chemical scalp preparation and straightening lotions. Her mentor Annie Malone is sometimes said to have patented the hot comb. Heated metal implements slide more easily through the hair, reducing damage and dryness. Women in the 1960s sometimes used clothing irons to straighten their hair.

In 1909, Isaac K. Shero patented the first hair straightener composed of two flat irons that are heated and pressed together.

Ceramic and electrical straighteners were introduced later, allowing adjustment of heat settings and straightener size. A ceramic hair straightener brush was patented in 2013. Sharon Rabi released the first straightening brush in 2015 under the DAFNI brand name. The ceramic straightening brush has a larger surface area than a traditional flat iron.

=== Crimping irons ===
Crimping irons or crimpers work by crimping hair in sawtooth style. The look is similar to the crimps left after taking out small braids. Crimping irons come in different sizes with different sized ridges on the paddles. Larger ridges produce larger crimps in the hair and smaller ridges produce smaller crimps. Crimped hair was very popular in the 1980s and 1990s.

== See also ==
- Hair dryer
- Hair roller
- Hot comb
