= Tranquillo Zerbi =

Italian automotive engineer (1891–1939)

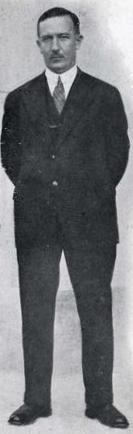
- Tranquillo Zerbi
- Born: January 2, 1891; Saronno
- Died: March 10, 1939 (aged 48); Turin, Italy
- Occupations: Automotive Engineer and, latterly, Technical Director with Fiat, 1919 to 1939

Tranquillo Zerbi (1891–1939) was a leading Italian automotive engineer.

== Early years ==
Zerbi attended primary school in Pisa before being relocated to Winterthur in Switzerland. He then moved again to the Grand Duchy of Baden, which at this point was a not yet fully integrated part of the German Empire. It was here that Zerbi attended the Engineering School at the University of Mannheim, emerging in 1912 with a diploma in mechanical engineering.

With his diploma, he returned to Winterthur. He took an internship with Sulzer, which enabled him to deepen his practical engineering knowledge and, in particular, to develop an expertise on diesel engines, which Sulzer had been producing since 1898.

== Career ==
Returning to Italy, Zerbi gained employment in Legnano with Franco Tosi & C, a pioneering business applying the newly emerging metal-based mechanical technologies. It was here that he worked under the direction of Ettore Maserati, one of five brothers soon to become famous following the foundation of the auto business that bears their family name. While at FTM Zerbi worked on the application of diesel engines to submarines.

In August 1919 he transferred to Fiat. There he was employed in the product development department, working on competition cars and, from 1925, also taking responsibility for the development of aero-engines destined for use in competition aircraft. His masterpiece was a 3000 HP 24 Cylinder behemoth of an engine which powered the world record-breaking Macchi Castoldi MC72 seaplane. It reached 709 Km/H just before World War II, with pilot officer Francesco Agello at the controls. The engine was basically two siamezed Fiat Vee 12 engines, bolted together end to end (to reduce surface-induced drag) and driving two contra-rotating two-blade, fixed-pitch propellers.

In 1929, after ten years with the company, Zerbi took over as director of the manufacturer’s extensive Technical Department. There, until March 1939, he inspired and led product development projects across the company’s wide field of activities in what became an increasingly high-profile role. In 1939 he was awarded the honorific status of “Grande Ufficiale della Corona d'Italia”, in recognition by the state of his contribution to aeronautical progress. Further public honours included his membership, and later chairmanship, of the Technical Committee of the Ente nazionale italiano di unificazione (“National Unification Commission of Italy”).

On 10 March 1939, Zerbi died suddenly of a heart attack that followed an aggressive bout of influenza. He left behind him a widow and three small children, and is buried on the cemetery at Pecetto Torinese, a quarter on the south side of Turin. Zerbi was a committed Fascist and his funeral cortege was accordingly headed up by a Guard of Honour of Blackshirts.
