= Marcelling =

Hair styling technique

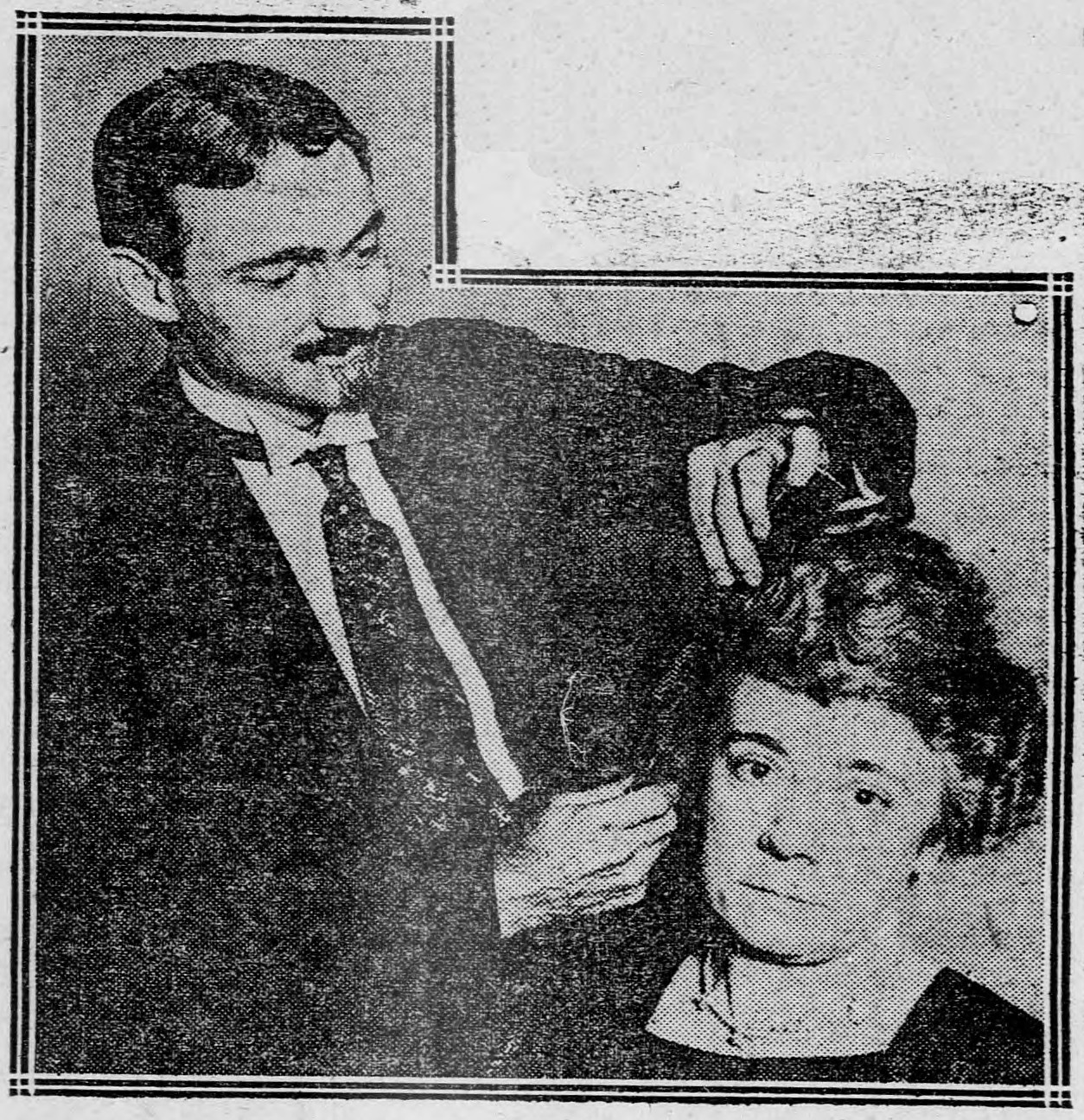
François Marcel marcelling his wife's hair, 1922

Marcelling is a hair styling technique in which hot curling tongs are used to induce a curl into the hair. Its appearance was similar to that of a finger wave but it is created using a different method.

Marcelled hair was a popular style for women's hair in the 1920s, often in conjunction with a bob cut. For those women who had longer hair, it was common to tie the hair at the nape of the neck and pin it above the ear with a stylish hair pin or flower. One famous wearer was Josephine Baker.

== History ==
Accounts vary about the invention of the style, but Marcel Grateau (October 18, 1852 – May 31, 1936) is widely credited with inventing the hair styling technique in the 1870s (differing accounts report 1872 or 1875). The inventor and stylist emigrated to the United States and changed his name to François Marcel Woelfflé, sometimes reported as François Marcel. He was granted U.S. patents for implements for performing the technique; the first, U.S. patent 806386, entitled "Curling-Iron", was published in 1905, and the second, entitled "Hair-Waving Iron", for an electric version, under the name François Marcel, was published in 1918. His obituary appeared under the name Francois Marcel Grateau in 1936.

== In popular culture ==
- In the 1914 song "By the Beautiful Sea", the female protagonist is said to have a job marcelling hair.
- The song "Keep Young and Beautiful", popular in 1934, references the hairstyle.
- The doo-wop group the Marcels were named after the hairstyle.
- British comedian Kenny Everett portrayed an over-the-top French stereotype by the name of Marcel Wave in his TV series.
- In the film Some Like It Hot, actor Tony Curtis stood up his girl who complains she just had her hair marcelled.

== See also ==
- Permanent wave
- List of hairstyles
