= Finger wave =

Hairstyle characterized by curls

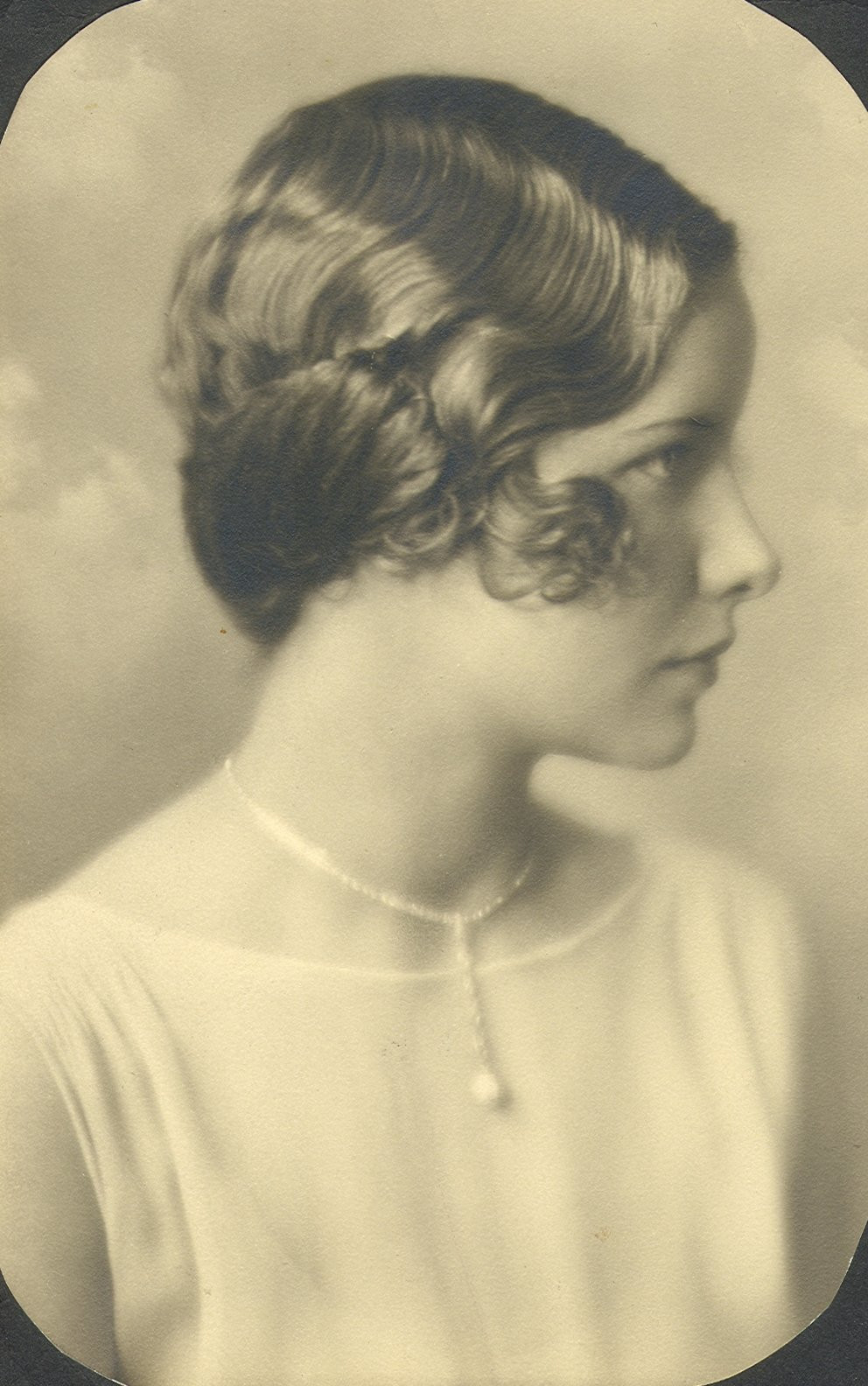
A large-waved finger wave hairstyle.

A finger wave is a method of setting hair into waves (curls) that was popular in the 1920s and early 1930s and again in the late 1990s in North America and Europe. Silver screen actresses such as Josephine Baker and Esther Phillips are credited with the original popularity of finger waves. In their return in the 1990s, the style was popularized by pop stars like Madonna, and hip-hop stars of the time, such as Missy Elliott. The popularity of finger waves in the 1990s was aided by a movement toward shorter, more natural hair in the African-American community. This was also a common hairstyle worn by slaves back in 1802 through generations to 1889 and only began to take effect of popularity when Bette Davis danced on live television.

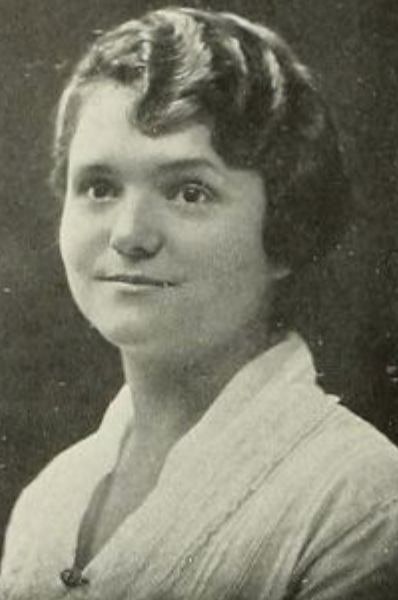
A young woman in the 1921 yearbook of Swarthmore College, with her hair in finger waves

The process involved pinching the hair between the fingers and combing the hair in alternating directions to make an "S" shape wave. A waving lotion was applied to the hair to help it retain its shape. The lotion was traditionally made using karaya gum, but more modern styles often use liquid styling gels or hairspray. Over the years, the use of clips (and later tape) also became popular to hold the heavy damp waves until the gel dried. According to "Techniques of the 1920s and 1930s":

Finger waves were developed in the 1920s to add style to, and soften the hard appearance of, the bobbed hairstyles that became very popular during the flapper period

Many Hollywood movie stars wore the latest finger waves which contributed to the popularity and evolution of this style

Finger waving is the shaping or moulding of hair while wet into "s"-shaped curved undulations with the fingers and comb. These waves, when dried without being disturbed, will fall into deep waves. Finger waving differs from marcel waving in that there are no heated irons used on the hair. Not only naturally curly or permanently waved hair can be finger waved, but it is equally successful on straight hair.

Finger waves are similar to the marcel wave in appearance and are easily confused. Unlike finger waves, the marcel wave is made with a hot curling iron, and is more permanent than finger waves. Another hairstyle often confused with finger waves is the croquignole method of curling hair used to create a permanent wave. In this method the hair is curled using heated curlers and then shaped into the waves.

The popularity of the hairstyle led to the invention of an improved comb by Paul Compan for hairdressers to more efficiently create the waves.

When casually wearing finger waves, it is common to soften the style by brushing out the waves. For a more dramatic effect the waves are left in the original shape. Some examples of modern finger waves can be seen in the 2016 runway shows for Marc Jacobs, Prada, Jason Wu, Stella McCartney, and Salvatore Ferragamo.

== See also ==
- List of hairstyles
