= Sky Showcase =

British entertainment television channel (2021-2026)

- Logo used from 2021 to 2026
- Broadcast area: United Kingdom; Ireland; Isle of Man; Channel Islands

Programming
- Picture format: 1080i HDTV (downscaled to 16:9 576i for the SDTV feed)
- Timeshift service: Sky Showcase +1

Ownership
- Owner: Sky Group (Comcast)
- Sister channels: List of Sky UK channels

History
- Launched: 1 September 2021; 4 years ago
- Replaced: Sky One
- Closed: 24 February 2026; 3 months ago
- Replaced by: Sky One

Availability (at time of closure)

Streaming media
- Sky Go: Watch live (UK and Ireland only)
- Now: Watch live (UK and Ireland only)
- Virgin TV Go: Watch live (UK only)
- Virgin TV Anywhere: Watch live (Ireland only)

Sky Showcase was a British pay television channel owned and operated by Sky Group, a division of American media company Comcast. It launched on 1 September 2021 and had simulcast programming from across Sky UK's portfolio of channels, including highlights from Sky Cinema, Sky News, and Sky Sports. Starting in January 2024, Sky Showcase began showing select programming from Sky Atlantic.

Sky Showcase was announced on 28 July 2021, along with Sky Max, as a replacement for flagship brand Sky One; with its programming transferred to Max and Sky Comedy. The channel closed down alongside Sky Max on 24 February 2026 and was replaced by the relaunched Sky One channel.

== Former programming ==
=== Sky Showcase exclusives ===
- Cleopatra in Space (Note: Moved from Sky One)
- The Croods: Family Tree
- Lego Dreamzzz: Trials of the Dream Chasers
- The Mighty Ones
- The Simpsons
- Turbo Fast

=== Sky Arts simulcasts ===
- Artist of the Year
- Landmark

=== Sky Atlantic simulcasts ===
- Atomic
- Band Of Brothers
- Big Little Lies
- Boardwalk Empire
- The Day of the Jackal
- Game Of Thrones
- Gangs of London
- The Gilded Age
- Mary & George
- The Regime
- The Sopranos
- Sweetpea
- The Iris Affair
- The Pacific
- The Sympathizer
- The Tattooist of Auschwitz
- True Blood
- True Detective: Night Country

=== Sky Comedy simulcasts ===
- American Auto
- And Just Like That...
- Avenue 5
- Breeders
- Code 404
- The Conners
- Curb Your Enthusiasm
- Last Week Tonight with John Oliver
- The Office
- Romantic Getaway
- Rosie Molloy Gives Up Everything
- Sex And The City
- Smothered
- Veep
- Wellington Paranormal
- Young Rock

=== Sky Crime simulcasts ===
- Motorway Patrol
- Nothing to Declare

=== Sky Documentaries simulcasts ===
- The Bambers: Murder at the Farm
- Hawking: Can You Hear Me?
- The Jinx Part 2

=== Sky Kids simulcasts ===
- Abominable and the Invisible City
- All Hail King Julien
- Dawn of the Croods
- DreamWorks Dragons: Rescue Riders
- Home: Adventures with Tip & Oh
- Madagascar: A Little Wild
- Moominvalley (Note: Moved from Sky One. Co-production with Yle TV2)
- My Little Pony: Friendship Is Magic
- Trolls: TrollsTopia

=== Sky Max simulcasts ===
- Agatha Raisin
- Based on a True Story
- Bel-Air
- The Blacklist
- Brassic
- COBRA
- A Discovery of Witches
- Evil
- Fantasy Island
- The Flash
- The Flight Attendant
- Frayed
- From
- Hacks
- Hold the Front Page
- Last King of the Cross
- The Lazarus Project
- A League of Their Own
- Legends of Tomorrow
- The Lost Symbol
- Magnum P.I.
- The Midwich Cuckoos
- NCIS: Los Angeles
- NCIS: New Orleans
- The Paper
- Peacemaker
- Poker Face
- Resident Alien
- Revival
- The Rising
- SEAL Team
- Stargate SG-1
- Supergirl
- S.W.A.T.
- Ted
- Temple
- A Town Called Malice
- The Walking Dead: Daryl Dixon
- The Walking Dead: Dead City
- The Walking Dead: The Ones Who Live
- Warrior
- Wolfe

=== Sky Nature simulcasts ===
- Big Cats: An Amazing Animal Family
- Impossible Animals
- Monkey Life
- Shark with Steve Backshall

=== Sky News simulcasts ===
- Mornings with Ridge and Frost
- Sky News Breakfast
- Sunday Morning with Trevor Phillips

=== Sky Sci-Fi simulcasts ===
- Chucky

=== Sky Sports simulcasts ===
- Formula One
- Live Boxing
- Men and Women's Betfred Super League (2023 Rivals Round)
- The Open Championship
- The Premier League Live
- The Super Bowl
- Women's Super League

=== Sky Witness simulcasts ===
- The Equalizer
