= Amanda Payton =

American actress

- Born: Santa Monica, California, U.S.
- Education: Carnegie Mellon School of Drama
- Occupation: Actor
- Years active: 2008–present

Amanda Payton is an American actress. She is best known for playing Nina Rudolph on the NBC sitcom Trial & Error, Dr. Alison Parfit on the Sky Comedy/Peacock police comedy-drama Code 404, and Holly in the CBS sitcom United States of Al.

== Early life ==
Payton was born in Santa Monica, California. She was educated at Los Angeles County High School for the Arts, and later attended Carnegie Mellon School of Drama, graduating with honors earning a Bachelor of Fine Arts.

== Career ==
In 2008, Payton began her on-screen television career in an episode of the CBS crime drama Numbers. She has also starred in episodes of other television series including, Southland, CSI: Cyber, Game Shakers, The Big Bang Theory, Workaholics, Animal Kingdom, NCIS, Modern Family, Grey's Anatomy, and Young Sheldon. Payton had small roles in the feature films The Perfect Host and Beginners, both released in 2010.

In 2018, Payton joined the second season of the NBC sitcom Trial & Error, playing Nina Rudolph, a podcast host who moves to the series' fictional town of East Peck, South Carolina from New York to follow the trial of Lavinia Peck Foster (played by Kristin Chenoweth), and ends up in a love triangle with the characters, Josh and Carol.

In 2020, Payton joined the Sky Comedy British police procedural comedy-drama Code 404, playing American scientist Dr. Alison Parfit, who leads an artificial intelligence project to revive a killed Detective Inspector using AI. The third season of the series premiered on August 4, 2022.

In 2021, Payton had a recurring role in the sitcom United States of Al playing Holly, the girlfriend of former Marine combat veteran, Riley Dugan. Also in 2021, Payton played the protagonist, Sawyer, in the Lifetime Christmas film A Fiancé for Christmas, which premiered on December 9, 2021. From 2021 to 2022, Payton had a two-episode role on the NBC police action drama Chicago P.D., as Celeste Nichols, Officer Kevin Atwater girlfriend.

In January 2022, it was announced that Payton would star in the upcoming NBC drama Unbroken as Ella, a winemaker at a Californian ranch who tries to keep her family together since her mother's death.

== Filmography ==
=== Television ===
Year	Title	Role	Notes
2008	Numbers	Tipsy Chick	Episode: "Jack of All Trades"
2011	Southland	Young Woman	Episode: "Cop or Not"
2015	The Bar	Ellie	7 episodes Web series
2015	CSI: Cyber	Nicole Gaines	Episode: "Brown Eyes, Blue Eyes"
2016	Game Shakers	Jackie	Episode: "Shark Explosion"
2016	The Big Bang Theory	Ainsley	Episode: "The Line Substitution Solution"
2017	Workaholics	Megan	Episode: "Faux Chella"
2017	Animal Kingdom	Dana	2 episodes
2017	NCIS	Misty Boxlarter	Episode: "Double Down"
2018	Trial & Error	Nina Rudolph	Main role
2018	Modern Family	Laura	Episode: "On the Same Paige"
2018	Grey's Anatomy	Dr. Daphne Lopez	Episode: "Let's All Go to the Bar"
2020	Young Sheldon	Meredith	Episode: "Pasadena"
2020–2022	Code 404	Dr. Alison Parfit	Main role
2021	Shameless	Flavia	Episode: "The Fickle Lady Is Calling It Quits"
2021	Hacks	Jackie	2 episodes
2021–2022	Chicago P.D.	Celeste Nichols	2 episodes
2021–2022	United States of Al	Holly	Recurring role
TBA	Unbroken	Ella	Main role
2023	9-1-1: Lone Star	Asha Fulton	4 episodes
2025	The Rookie	Anita	2 episodes

=== Film ===
Year	Title	Role	Notes
2010	The Perfect Host	Girl at Party	
2010	Beginners	Party Person	
2012	Broom and Roses	Fosse Dancer / Lover Girl	Short film
2012	Guitar Face	Cinnamon Kitty	Short film
2017	Miss Me This Christmas	Holly	
2018	Find What You Love and Let It Kill You	Heather	Short film
2020	Half Husband	Melanie	Short film
2021	Daddy Isn't Here Right Now	Angela	Short film
2021	A Fiancé for Christmas	Sawyer	
TBA	The Guardian	The Guardian	
TBA	The Morg	Allison Baker	
