= Katherine Ryan =

Canadian comedian, writer, and actor (born 1983)

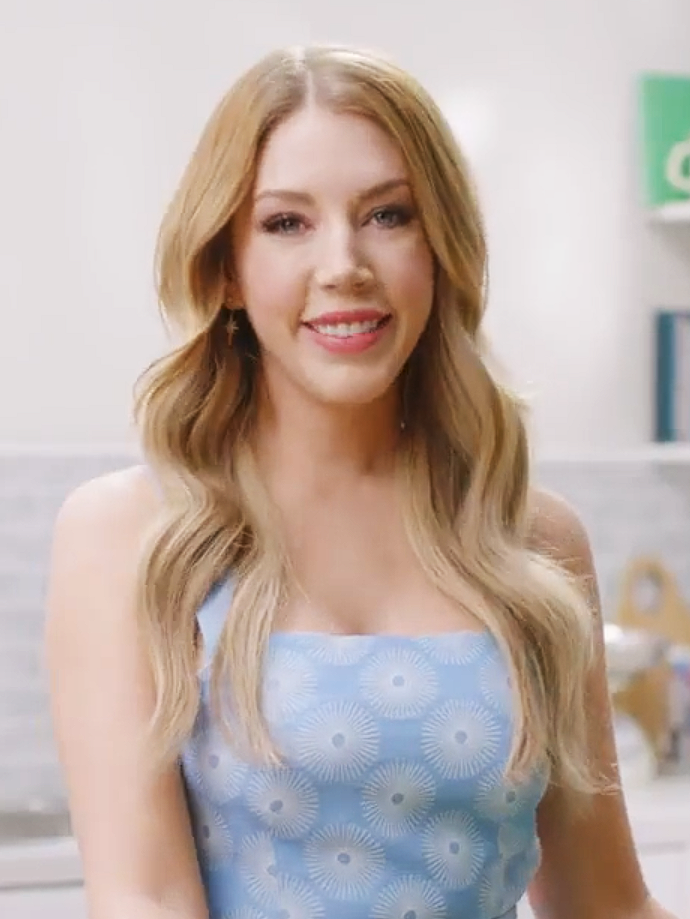
- Ryan in 2018
- Born: Katherine Louisa Ryan; June 1983 (age 43); Sarnia, Ontario, Canada
- Citizenship: Canadian; Irish
- Education: Ryerson University (BA)
- Occupations: Comedian; writer; actress; presenter
- Partner: Bobby Kootstra (cp. 2019–present)
- Children: 4

Katherine Louisa Ryan (born June 1983) is a Canadian comedian, writer, presenter, actress and singer. She has appeared on British TV and radio panel shows, including 8 Out of 10 Cats, Never Mind the Buzzcocks, A League of Their Own, Mock the Week, Would I Lie to You?, QI, Just a Minute, Safeword, and Have I Got News for You. In 2015 she replaced Steve Jones as the presenter of Hair on BBC Two. As an actress, Ryan has appeared on several television sitcoms in the UK, including Campus, Episodes, and her Netflix show The Duchess.

As a stand-up comedian, Ryan has appeared on the BBC's Live at the Apollo, both as a featured act and as a lead act. She has had two live stand-up specials released on Netflix: Katherine Ryan: In Trouble (2017) and Katherine Ryan: Glitter Room (2019).

== Early life ==
Ryan's father, Finbar, is a draughtsman and owner of an engineering company who originally emigrated from Ireland to Canada. Her mother, Julie McCarthy, owns an IT consulting company. Ryan and her two younger sisters were born and raised in Sarnia, Ontario. She also holds Canadian and Irish citizenship.

Ryan's parents separated when she was a teenager. When she was eighteen, she chose to study city planning at Ryerson University (now Toronto Metropolitan University) in Toronto. While at university, she worked at restaurant chain Hooters, and she then began training other waitresses. In her spare time, she performed at open mic nights for her own entertainment, and by graduation she had developed a basic stand-up comedy routine. She was one of the many dancers in MuchMusic's Electric Circus program.

After graduation, Ryan continued working for Hooters as a corporate trainer, travelling around Canada to train other waitresses, and helping to open the inaugural UK branch in Nottingham. Her partner at the time, Wade McElwain, wanted to explore London, so she agreed to do so for an initial month in the summer of 2007, moving there permanently from January 2008.

== Career ==
=== Comedian ===
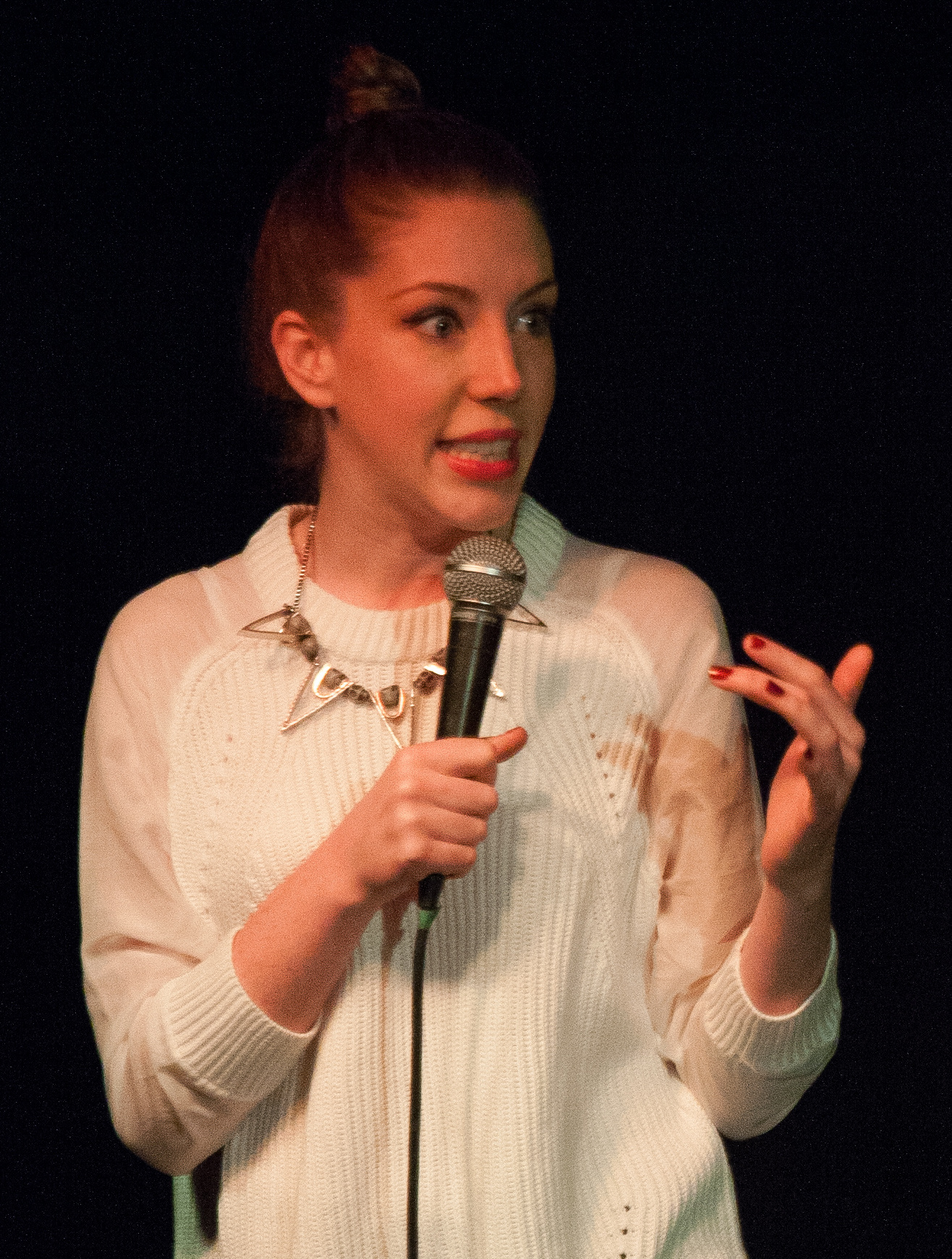
Ryan performing stand-up in 2012

Ryan won the Funny Women award in 2008. Rachel Stubbings and Sara Pascoe were runners-up.

Ryan first appeared on television as herself in episodes of the Canadian music video review show Video on Trial between season one in 2005 and her last appearance in 2008 in season three. For her comedy work, she won the 2008 Funny Women Award and was described as "the funniest new female stand-up in Britain" by a national newspaper. After relocating to the United Kingdom, she first appeared on Channel 4's 8 Out of 10 Cats in 2012. She had previously appeared in the cast of Channel 4's Campus.

On 23 February 2013, she appeared as a celebrity contestant on BBC One's Let's Dance for Comic Relief as Nicki Minaj dancing to "Starships". Ryan reached the final, and finished in fourth place. She was later featured on the Whitney Cummings Just for Laughs 2013 Gala that was taped before a live audience on 28 July 2013. She has since taken new routines to the Edinburgh Festival. In 2013, Ryan was the subject of controversy over her participation on Mock the Week in the segment "Unlikely Lines From a Cosmetics Commercial", where one of her jokes was "We don't test any of our products on animals. We use Filipino children." Filipino groups held silent protests at the BBC office to demand an apology from her.

In 2015, Ryan replaced Steve Jones as the presenter of Hair on BBC Two. Also in 2015, Ryan became a panellist for Tinie Tempah's team on Sky 1's music/comedy panel show Bring the Noise and on the ITV2 show, Safeword. In 2016, Ryan appeared on series 2 of Taskmaster. She beat Doc Brown, Joe Wilkinson, Richard Osman and Jon Richardson, to win the season.

Ryan went on a comedy tour in 2016, called Kathbum, a name her toddler sister used to call her. In February 2017, Netflix released Katherine Ryan: In Trouble, featuring her stand-up comedy live performance at the Hammersmith Apollo in London, during that tour.

She joined Jimmy Carr in 2017 to host four series of the reboot of Your Face or Mine?. In 2018, Ryan joined American comedy panel show, The Fix as a team captain. In July 2019, Netflix released her second live stand-up special, Katherine Ryan: Glitter Room. In a 2021 interview, she was accused of racism by some viewers on social media when she attempted to encourage a female Sri Lankan designer by saying "You need to really back yourself. Do you know how confident a straight white man would be right now? Think about Boris Johnson, how pleased he'd be right now." The BBC responded that such a comment was in line with reasonable expectations of Ryan's humour. In February 2023, Ryan won the Outstanding Female Comedy Entertainment Performance award at the 2023 National Comedy Awards for Backstage with Katherine Ryan.

As host of Have I Got News for You in November 2025, Ryan likened Victoria Beckham to a "cunt" during a discussion about her husband David Beckham's alleged use of the word. The following September, the BBC upheld complaints about Ryan's joke, and removed it from the BBC iPlayer.

=== Actress ===
As an actress, Ryan has appeared on numerous television series in the UK, including the sitcoms Campus, Episodes and Badults. Ryan starred in the Netflix comedy The Duchess, based on a single mother's life in London; she is credited as its writer, executive producer, and creator.

Ryan appeared in the eighteenth season finale of Murdoch Mysteries, "We Take Care of Our Own" (April 14, 2025), as Kiera Ryan, who is a woman ahead of her time, a stand up comedienne.

=== Other work ===
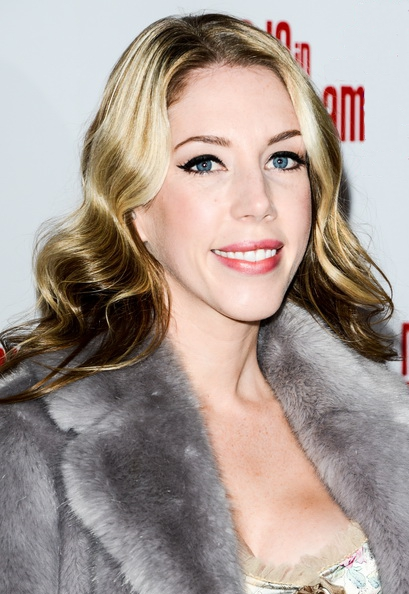
Ryan in 2014

On 6 June 2014, YouTube comedy duo Jack and Dean released a music video for their song "Consent" featuring Ryan in an acting role.

In 2015 and 2016, Ryan wrote a weekly column in the British entertainment magazine NME. In 2016 she featured in Disney XD and Teletoon's animated television series Counterfeit Cat, where she voiced Ranceford, the stuck-up, white, odd-eyed cat and leader of the Sunshine Circle for Cats.

In 2021, Ryan hosted the six-part reality competition All That Glitters: Britain's Next Jewellery Star on BBC2. Also in 2021, she presented the ITV2 dating show Ready to Mingle. Ryan released her debut memoir "The Audacity" in September 2021.

In November 2022, Ryan was the subject of an interview in the BBC series Louis Theroux Interviews... with Louis Theroux, during which she told Theroux about the "open secret" of an alleged sexual abuser who was a prominent TV personality. The man was later revealed to be Russell Brand, with whom Ryan had worked on Roast Battle in 2018. During filming she publicly accused him of being a sexual predator, although the allegations were not broadcast. Brand left after the first series. In 2026 he was convicted of rape and sexual assault charges and imprisoned.

In January 2023, Ryan appeared as "Pigeon" on the fourth series of The Masked Singer.

In early 2025, Ryan appeared as a judge on the fifth season of Canada's Got Talent.

On 19 June 2025, Ryan was announced as reunion host of The Real Housewives of London.

== Personal life ==
Ryan was in a relationship with American comedian Alex Edelman, which ended in 2019.

Ryan gave birth to her first child, a daughter, at the age of 25.

In 2019, Ryan entered into a civil partnership with Bobby Kootstra. The two had dated in Canada as teenagers and were reunited when Ryan returned to her hometown while filming an episode of the TV show Who Do You Think You Are? Ryan and Kootstra have three children together: son Frederick 'Freddy' (born in June 2021) and daughters Fenna and Holland (born in December 2022 and October 2025).

Ryan was diagnosed with stage II melanoma in her twenties; a mole on her leg was removed. In 2025, she was diagnosed with early melanoma and underwent a mole removal. Ryan was also diagnosed with lupus in 2008.

== Filmography ==
Year	Name	Role	Notes
2005–2008	Video on Trial	Juror	
2009–2011	Campus	George Bryan	
2012	Episodes	Merc's assistant	
2012–2014	Never Mind the Buzzcocks	Panelist	
2013	Count Arthur Strong	Tourist woman	
2013	Badults	Lucy	
2013, 2017	QI	Contestant	
2013–2026	Have I Got News For You	Panelist/Host	10 (5 as panelist, 5 as host)
2014	Duck Quacks Don't Echo	Panelist	
2014	Alan Davies: As Yet Untitled	Panelist	
2014	Live at the Apollo	Guest	With host Jack Whitehall and fellow guest, Rich Hall
2015	Hair	Host	
2015	Bring the Noise	Panelist	
2015	Live at the Apollo	Host	With guests Henning Wehn and James Acaster
2015–2016	Safeword	Team captain	
2015–2017	Jack Dee's Election Helpdesk	Regular panelist	
2016	Sunny D	Kerry	
2016	The Chase	Contestant	
2016	It's Not Me, It's You	Guest team captain	
2016	Comedy Central at the Comedy Store	Host, self	
2016–2017	Counterfeit Cat	Ranceford, Nelson, various	
2016, 2017, 2019	Taskmaster	Contestant	Series 2 champion Contestant in two-part Champion of Champions special Stand-in for Katy Wix in Series 9 episode
2016, 2018	Would I Lie to You?	Panelist	
2017	How'd You Get So Rich? (UK)	Presenter	
2017	The Big Fat Quiz of Everything	Contestant	
2017	The Fake News Show	Team captain, panelist	
2017	All Star Driving School	Narrator	
2017	Tipping Point	Contestant	
2017	Insert Name Here	Panelist	
2017	Noel at the Apollo	Host	With Marlon Davis, Joel Dommett and John Robins
2017–2019	Your Face or Mine	Co-presenter	With Jimmy Carr
2018	Dara O Briain's Go 8 Bit	Panelist	
2018	Beyond Bionic	Narrator	
2018	The Fix	Self, co-captain	
2020	The Duchess	Katherine	
2020	Urban Myths	Joan Rivers	
2021	All That Glitters: Britain's Next Jewellery Star	Host	With judges Shaun Leane and Solange Azagury-Partridge
2021	Ready to Mingle	Host	
2022	Backstage with Katherine Ryan	Katherine Ryan	
2022	Big Zuu's Big Eats	Herself	
2022	All That Glitters: Britain's Next Jewellery Star	Host	With judges Shaun Leane and Dinny Hall
2022	Louis Theroux Interviews Katherine Ryan	Herself	With Louis Theroux
2022	Big Fat Quiz of the Year	Panelist	With Maisie Adam
2023	Romantic Getaway	Alison	
2023	The Masked Singer	Pigeon	Unmasked in episode 5
2023	Celebrity Gogglebox	Herself	Alongside her partner, Bobby Kootstra
2023	90 Day Fiance UK	Host	
2024–2025	At Home With Katherine Ryan	Herself	Two series
2024	RuPaul's Drag Race: UK vs. the World	Herself (Guest judge)	Series 2
2024	Out of Order	Co-host	Alongside Rosie Jones and Judi Love
2024	Joe and Katherine's Bargain Holidays	Co-presenter	With Joe Wilkinson
2024	Cooking With The Stars	Contestant	Series 4
2024–present	Canada's Got Talent	Judge	Season 5
2025–	The Real Housewives of London	Reunion host	
2025	The Bad Guys 2	Maureen	Voice cameo: UK version
2025	Tinsel Town	Agent	
2025	Who Wants to Be a Millionaire?	Contestant	Christmas Special
2025	The Big Fat Quiz of the Year	Channel 4	

=== Podcasts ===
Year	Title	Role	Notes	Ref.
2025	Saving Grace	Guest		

=== Stand-up specials ===
Year	Title	Platform	Ref.
2017	Katherine Ryan: In Trouble	Netflix	
2019	Katherine Ryan: Glitter Room	Netflix	
2022	Katherine Ryan: Missus	Sky Comedy	
2025	Katherine Ryan: First Born Daughter	Sky Comedy	

=== Stand-up tours ===
Year	Title	Countries	Ref.
2021–2022	Missus	United Kingdom and Ireland	
2024–2025	Battleaxe	United Kingdom and Ireland	
