= Savannah Steyn =

ENglish actress (born 1996)

- Born: 1996 (age 29–30); London, England
- Education: Guildhall School of Music and Drama (BA)
- Years active: 2016–present

Savannah Steyn (born 1996) is an English actress. She starred in the Sky One series Intergalactic (2021) and the film Good Boy (2025).

== Early life ==
Steyn was born in the South London Borough of Wandsworth. She is of South African descent. She attended the BRIT School before going on to graduate from the Guildhall School of Music and Drama.

== Career ==
Steyn made her television debut as Kaylah in the third series of the Sky Atlantic and Canal+ crime drama The Tunnel. She then played Chantal in the BBC Three short-form sitcom Wannabe. She also made a guest appearance in the Sky One series A Discovery of Witches and starred in the short Ladies Day for Shortflix.

Steyn played Lisa in the 2019 horror film Crawl. In 2021, Steyn starred as Ash Harper in the science fiction series Intergalactic, also on Sky One. The following year, she played young Laena Velaryon (played by Nanna Blondell as an adult) in an episode of the HBO fantasy series House of the Dragon, a Game of Thrones prequel.

In 2025, Steyn played Mo in the BBC iPlayer comedy drama Crongton, which adapts Alex Wheatle's children's book series of the same name. Steyn also portrayed Queenie in the Amazon Prime Video action series Ride or Die, which premiered on July 15, 2026.

== Filmography ==
=== Film ===
Year	Title	Role	Notes
2016	Fulcrum	Charlie	Short film
2018	Ladies Day	Amma	Shortflix
2019	Crawl	Lisa	
2023	The New Girl	Destiny	Short Film
2024	5lbs of Pressure	Lori	
2024	Played & Betrayed	Andrea	
2025	Good Boy	Gabby	

=== Television ===
Year	Title	Role	Notes
2017–2018	The Tunnel	Kaylah	3 episodes
2018	Wannabe	Chantal	4 episodes
2018	A Discovery of Witches	Waitress	1 episode
2020	Mister Winner	Leanne	Episode: "The Interview"
2021	Intergalactic	Ash Harper	Main role
2022	House of the Dragon	Young Laena Velaryon	Episode: "We Light the Way"
2023	Black Cake	Grace Sinnema	Episode: "Mother"
2025	Crongton	Mo	
2026	Ride or Die	Queenie	8 episodes

== Stage ==
- Hatch (2016), Talawa Theatre Company, Hackney Showroom

== Audio ==
- "Marina Hyde, FKA twigs, and extortionate hand soaps" (2022), Weekend Podcast
