= Intergalactic (TV series) =

British science fiction TV Series (premiered 2021)

- Genre: Science fiction; Drama
- Created by: Julie Gearey
- Starring: Savannah Steyn; Eleanor Tomlinson; Natasha O'Keeffe
- Country of origin: United Kingdom
- Original language: English
- No. of series: 1
- No. of episodes: 8

Production
- Executive producers: Julie Gearey; Paul Gilbert; Richard Foster; Tony Moulsdale; Matthew Read; Frith Tiplady; Iona Vrolyk
- Producers: Bryony Arnold; Simon Maloney
- Production companies: Motion Content Group; Moonage Pictures; Tiger Aspect Productions

Original release
- Network: Sky One
- Release: 30 April 2021

Intergalactic is a British science fiction television series created by Julie Gearey. It follows a crew of fierce convicts who break free and go on the run. The series premiered on 30 April 2021 on Sky One. In August 2021, Sky cancelled the show after one series.

== Premise ==
In 2143, climate change has ravaged the planet and the world's cities, now mostly under new structures, are controlled by a pseudodemocratic government called the "Commonworld". Sky cop Harper (Savannah Steyn) is framed for a crime and placed onboard a prisoner transport ship, the Hemlock, bound for an off-planet prison. She is thrown into a mutiny stirred up by a band of hardened female criminals who threaten to kill her unless she pilots them to safety.

== Cast and characters ==
=== Main ===
- Savannah Steyn as Ash Harper, a police officer with the Commonworld Police, framed for the theft of new aurum, the critically dwindling energy source for Commonworld
- Eleanor Tomlinson as Candy Skov-King, an inmate on board the prison transport ship Grand Commonworld Carrier (GCC) Hemlock, an alien from the Aurean galaxy in debt to Tula
- Natasha O'Keeffe as Emma Grieves, an inmate on Hemlock, former lead scientist of Commonworld, founding member of the ARC, a resistance movement against Commonworld's environmental damage to other planets
- Sharon Duncan-Brewster as Tula Quik, an inmate on Hemlock, planner of the prison break
- Thomas Turgoose as Drew Bunchanon, a guard on Hemlock
- Imogen Daines as Verona Flores, a cyber-hacker inmate on Hemlock
- Diany Samba-Bandza as Genevieve Quik, a cyber-enhanced fighter inmate on Hemlock, Tula's daughter
- Craig Parkinson as Dr. Benedict Lee, Leader of the Commonworld government
- Parminder Nagra as Arch-Marshall Rebecca Harper, Head of Galactic Security for the Commonworld and Ash’s mother
- Oliver Coopersmith as Echo Nantu-Rose, a space pirate who joins the group on Hemlock
- Hakeem Kae-Kazim as Yann Harper, a war hero, an ARC leader and Ash's father
- Phyllis Logan as Phoebe Skov-King, Candy's mother

=== Supporting ===
- Neil Maskell as Sergeant Wendell, Ash’s supervising officer, a member of the ARC resistance who frames Ash for a major theft, serving Yann Harper’s plan to reunite with his daughter
- Samantha Schnitzler as Captain Alessia Harris, a member of Arch-Marshall Harper's Galactic Security
- Emily Bruni as the voice of the Hemlock
- Lisa Palfrey as Zeeda, a ruthless crime lord

== Episodes ==
No.	Title	Directed by	Written by	Original release date
1	"Episode 1"	Kieron Hawke	Julie Gearey	April 30, 2021
Ash Harper is a rookie police officer who apprehends the cyber criminal Verona Flores in the ruins of London. Harper is later accused of stealing evidence. While awaiting trial, Harper is imprisoned along with Flores and other criminals aboard the prison ship Hemlock. Her mother Arch Marshall Rebecca discovers her daughter was framed by her sergeant Wendell. Before the authorities can release Harper, Tula and her daughter Genevieve hijack and commandeer the prison ship, killing most of the guards and crew except Drew. The criminals force Ash to fly the prison ship to Arcadia. Ash powers up the Alcubierre warp drive and its energy boom causes two pursuing Commonworld cruisers to crash into one another and are destroyed.
2	"Episode 2"	Kieron Hawke	Julie Gearey	April 30, 2021
They crash land on a sandy planet. Tula, Genevieve and Candy visit a nearby mining settlement to attend to Candy's bullet injuries. Ash escapes the ship with Dr. Emma Grieves but later knocks her out. After encountering a local pirate named Echo Nantu-Ros, Ash manages to contact her mother Rebecca and the Commonworld leadership, who task her with helping them to hunt down Dr. Grieves, claiming she is a terrorist. Tula buys the route to Arcadia, a planet she wants to live on, from Zeeda (a female crime boss who controls the town) but is double-crossed over it. Meanwhile, Rebecca interrogates Wendell, who reveals himself to be a member of a resistance movement fighting the Commonworld's exploitation of other worlds. Grieves shoots down a Commonworld drone while Ash is recaptured by Tula and her gang. Grieves is later wounded during a shootout with Tula but is able to heal herself. Echo helps the prisoners escape aboard the Hemlock. Grieves comes to an understanding with Ash and convinces Tula that she can help her reach Arcadia.
3	"Episode 3"	Kieron Hawke	Julie Gearey	April 30, 2021
With the Hemlock running low on fuel rods, Ash, Echo and Verona take the shuttle on a mission to obtain the objects from a Commonworld outpost on Nar 59. During the course of the mission, Verona kills a Commonworld technician after Ash frees him in order to pass a message to the authorities. Meanwhile, Tula confides in Grieves about her fears. Following the heist, Ash and Verona come to a new understanding. Ash learns that Verona hates the Commonworld for raping her mother and killing her father. Back on Earth, Rebecca uses coercion to force Wendell to reveal a secret resistance plot to kidnap Ash. She then contacts her purportedly dead husband Yann Harper, who reveals he is the leader of the resistance and that he engineered Ash’s kidnapping in order to reunite with his daughter.
4	"Episode 4"	Kieron Hawke	Nick V. Murphy & Julie Gearey	April 30, 2021
With the Commonworld hunting for the Hemlock, the gang attempt to commandeer a ship that is inhabited by the scientist Professor Blake and his menagerie of animals. Blake is a former colleague of Grieves who shares her environmentalist ideals. However, he traps and separates the crew of the Hemlock, intending to harvest eggs from Grieves. Verona manages to break free of her restraints and free Tula, who kills Blake. Tula's willingness to use force clashes with Grieves' pacifist beliefs. Ash also obtains a communication device which she attempts to use to communicate with the Commonworld. However, she is bitten by a spider that Grieves brought back from Blake's ship. Meanwhile, Rebecca meets with a resistance contact in Old London in an attempt to find Ash. However, the contact is assassinated by Commonworld security forces.
5	"Episode 5"	Kieron Hawke	Julie Gearey	April 30, 2021
The crew of the Hemlock travel to a snowy planet that is the homeworld of Candy. After obtaining medical treatment for the unconscious Ash, Echo and Verona foil an apparent kidnapping attempt on Grieves; which turns out to be an attempt by her people to rescue her. Candy introduces the crew to her mother, who seeks to reconcile with her wayward daughter. Ash reveals their location to the Commonworld, who send soldiers to capture Grieves. Candy's mother is killed in the firefight during the capture of Grieves, during which Ash encounters her father Yann, whom she believed to have died. After returning to the Hemlock, a furious Verona knocks Ash unconscious for betraying Grieves to the Commonworld. Meanwhile, Arch Marshall Rebecca shows mercy to the relatives of a "traitor" due to her newfound belief that they should not punished for their relatives' crimes.
6	"Episode 6"	China Moo-Young	Julie Gearey & Archie Maddocks	April 30, 2021
After fleeing into space, Ash is shunned by the other crew for her betrayal of Dr Grieves. Candy is grief-stricken by the death of her mother. The crew of the Hemlock are forced to work together after they are infected by a communicable parasite that turns people temporarily into fearsome zombies. To save the others, Ash infects herself with the parasite and volunteers to walk out the airlock. However, Candy discovers that Ash has cells that are immune to the parasite, allowing her to develop a cure which she uses to treat the other crew. While Candy has reconciled with Ash, Tula still distrusts her. Meanwhile, Arch Marshall Rebecca meets a defiant Dr Grieves. After discovering the whereabouts of Dr Grieves, the crew mount a mission to rescue her.
7	"Episode 7"	China Moo-Young	Laura Grace	April 30, 2021
The crew of the Hemlock travel to the ocean world of Kelp in order to rescue Dr Grieves and obtain the coordinates to Arcadia. The Commonworld leaders Rebecca and Dr Lee are using Dr Grieves as an unwilling energy source. While Ash and Verona infiltrate the Commonworld base to rescue Dr Grieves, Tula along with Genevieve and Echo enter into a gambling match to acquire the coordinates. Ash encounters her mother Rebecca but renounces the Commonworld due to its exploitation of the colonies. With the help of Verona, they free Dr Grieves, who damages the conduit machine. Dr Lee denounces Rebecca's family but is killed by Rebecca. Tula and her team lose the gambling match and Genevieve is taken as a hostage.
8	"Episode 8"	China Moo-Young	Ben Schiffer	April 30, 2021
While continuing their voyage to Arcadia, the crew discover a Commonworld tracking device aboard the Hemlock. The crew distrust Tula for allowing her daughter Genevieve to be sold off as collateral and confine her to the brig. Ash and Verona acknowledge their mutual attraction, and have sex. Verona removes the tracking device but her spacesuit suffers an oxygen leak. Ash advises her to cut a hole in her glove, saving her from death in space. As they approach Arcadia, the Hemlock is forced to travel between two stars. With the encouragement of Dr Grieves, Ash pilots the ship safely to their destination. Verona is revealed as the spy but escapes in the cargo transport. Ash establishes contact with her father Yann, the resistance leader. Back on Earth, Rebecca stages a funeral for Ash, who is regarded as a hero. After leaking information about the new aurum energy shortage, Rebecca stages a coup against the scientists and vows to find alternative energy sources for the Commonworld.

== Production ==
Iona Vrolyk serves as series executive producer. The first five episodes of the eight episode series were directed by Kieron Hawke, the following three by China Moo-Young. On 26 August 2021, Sky cancelled the show after one series.

== Broadcast ==
The series premiered on 30 April 2021 on Sky One.

=== International release ===
In Australia, the series was released on 1 May 2021 on Stan. In United States, the series was released on 13 May 2021 on Peacock, and was later broadcast on Syfy debuting on 10 November 2021. In New Zealand, the series was released on 18 May 2021 on Sky's Sky Go and Neon streaming service. In Italy, the series was released on 31 May 2021 on Sky Atlantic and on Now streaming service.

== Reception ==
Empire's Ian Freer awarded the series' two out of five stars. He complimented Intergalactic's diverse female cast and ambitious story but criticised what he regarded as the "up on-the-nose writing, blunt performances and an overwhelming sense of déjà vu." He also described the series as derivative of older franchises including Star Wars, Firefly, Blake's 7, and Alien.

NME Australia's Ralph Jones awarded Intergalactic two out of five stars, opining that the series' visuals and expensive computer generated imagery were offset by its poor dialogue and story.

The Independent's Sean O'Grady gave Intergalactic three out of five stars. While commending the series' straight-forward plot, he criticised its lack of "human emotions and motivations."

Stuff's James Croot gave Intergalactic a mixed review, describing the space drama as a female-led, futuristic version Con Air. While criticising the series' lack of novelty and what he regarded as its insufficient action scenes and special effects, Croot commended the series' makeup, costumes, and production design. He also praised the performance of cast members Savannah Steyn, Parminder Nagra, Eleanor Tomlinson, and Natasha O'Keeffe.

Liam Maguren of the NZ entertainment news website Flicks gave Intergalactic a favourable review, praising its female ensemble cast for defying the film industry's stereotype of "strong female women" being heroic and faultless characters by featuring strong female characters with flaws.
