= Trial & Error (TV series) =

American sitcom television series

- Genre: Sitcom; Mockumentary; Surreal comedy
- Created by: Jeff Astrof; Matt Miller
- Starring: Nicholas D'Agosto; Jayma Mays; Steven Boyer; Krysta Rodriguez; Sherri Shepherd; John Lithgow; Amanda Payton; Kristin Chenoweth
- Composer: John Swihart
- Country of origin: United States
- Original language: English
- No. of seasons: 2
- No. of episodes: 23

Production
- Executive producers: Jeffrey Blitz; Matt Miller; Jeff Astrof
- Producer: Marlis Pujol
- Production locations: Burbank, California (season 1); Vancouver (season 2)
- Editors: Yana Gorskaya; Dane McMaster
- Camera setup: Single-camera
- Running time: 22 minutes
- Production companies: Other Shoe Productions; Good Session Productions; Warner Bros. Television

Original release
- Network: NBC
- Release: March 14, 2017 – August 23, 2018

Trial & Error is an American mockumentary legal sitcom television series created by Jeff Astrof and Matt Miller for NBC and produced by Warner Bros. Television. It stars Nicholas D'Agosto, Jayma Mays, Steven Boyer, and Sherri Shepherd. The series, which spoofs documentaries and reality legal shows, follows New York City lawyer Josh Segal (D'Agosto) and his eccentric local associates (Boyer and Shepherd) as they represent accused local citizens in the fictional small town of East Peck, South Carolina. Recurring guests were Krysta Rodriguez and John Lithgow in season 1, and Kristin Chenoweth and Amanda Payton in season 2.

The first season premiered on March 14, 2017. On May 20, 2017, NBC renewed the series for a 10-episode second season. Both seasons have received positive critical reception. The series was officially cancelled on January 16, 2019, after NBC decided against renewing it for a third season in August 2018 and Warner Bros. failed to find a new broadcaster.

== Premise ==
The series is a comedic legal mockumentary about a young bright-eyed New York lawyer, Josh Segal, who settles in the fictional, small Southern town of East Peck, South Carolina, with an oddball defense team that solves cases from behind a taxidermy shop. In the first season, they defend a compulsively eccentric poetry professor, Larry Henderson who is accused of the bizarre murder of his beloved wife. The case becomes challenging because his client is always making himself look guilty. The second season is subtitled "Lady, Killer" and centers on the defense of Lavinia Peck-Foster, the town's beloved debutante who has been accused of murdering her husband. The prosecutor on each case is assistant DA Carol Anne Keane, a young lawyer determined to use the cases to raise her profile, and with whom Josh has sporadic sexual encounters.

== Cast and characters ==
=== Main ===
Season 2 poster with the cast of the season.

- Nicholas D'Agosto as Josh Segal, a defense lawyer from New York who finds his first experience of murder trials in East Peck, South Carolina. He has to put up with the antics of his team members much to his chagrin. He becomes involved in a love triangle between Carol Anne and Nina during Season 2.
- Jayma Mays as Carol Anne Keane, Assistant District Attorney of East Peck and Josh's rival as well as love interest. She becomes pregnant in Season 2, expecting a baby by an unknown father.
- Steven Boyer as Dwayne Reed, Josh's lead investigator and a former police officer in East Peck. He rejoins the police force in Season 2, while simultaneously working for the defense team.
- Sherri Shepherd as Anne Flatch, Josh's assistant/head researcher who has rare and bizarre disorders.
- Krysta Rodriguez as Summer Henderson (season 1), the daughter of Larry Henderson who later joins Josh's team. Like Josh, she is serious and the least nonsensical of the group.
- John Lithgow as Larry Henderson (season 1), a poetry professor and the suspect on trial for the murder of his wife.
- Amanda Payton as Nina Rudolph (season 2), a stylish podcast host who moves to East Peck from New York to follow the trial of Lavinia Peck Foster and ends up tangled in a love triangle.
- Kristin Chenoweth as Lavinia Peck-Foster (season 2), an eccentric heiress of East Peck. She hires Josh and his associates after finding her husband stuffed in a suitcase in the back of her car.

=== Recurring ===
- Bob Gunton as Jeremiah Jefferson Davis, a tobacco businessman, Margaret's brother, and hence Larry's brother-in-law.
- Cristine Rose as Josie Jefferson Davis, the quiet, alcoholic wife of Jeremiah and the sister-in-law of Larry and Margaret Henderson.
- Angel Parker as Heidi Baker, a local TV journalist who reports on the investigation of Larry Henderson.
- Dave Allen as Dave, a taxidermist who owns a shop next to Josh's office.
- Kevin Daniels as Alfonzo Prefontaine, Larry's fitness trainer and lover.
- Patricia Belcher as E. Horsedich (pronounced Hi-sen-dich, with a soft "c" on the last syllable), the judge who presides over the case of People v. Larry Henderson.
- Kevin Durand as Rutger Hiss, a local police officer who leads the investigation of Larry Henderson. Despite his comatose state, he is elected mayor of East Peck in Season 2.
- Julie Hagerty as Madame Rhonda, a pet psychic who later becomes Juror 9 in the trial of People v. Larry Henderson.
- Michael Hitchcock as Jesse Ray Beaumont (season 2), a horologist that was tried and convicted for the murder of Lavinia's brother Chet nine years ago.
- Joel McCrary as Alexander Kamiltow (season 2), the judge for Lavinia's trial. Unlike Horsedich, his name is pronounced the way it is spelled. After trying to stop a chaotic outburst in Jesse Ray Beaumont's trial, he lost his voice, and now speaks in unintelligible gibberish, yet everyone but Josh understands him perfectly.
- Shannon Chan-Kent as Clem Tuckett (season 2), an anchorwoman covering the investigation of Lavinia Peck-Foster.
- Serge Houde as Milton The Houseboy (season 2), Lavinia's loyal manservant and long-suffering confidante.
- Jaleel White as Atticus Ditto, Jr. (season 2), the prosecutor who took over Beaumont's first Trial when Carol Anne was removed, and Carol Anne's rival for the D.A. election.
- Andy Thompson as Dr Rock n' Law (season 2), Beaumont's defense attorney in his original trial, and aspiring rock musician.

=== Guest ===
- Andrew Daly as Thom Hinkle, a DNA expert who suffers from a bizarre type of OCD. It is revealed in season 2 that he is now decommissioned because of his bizarre OCD.
- Marla Gibbs as Mrs. Kratt, Larry's antipathetic neighbor.
- Fred Melamed as Howard Mankiewicz, a founding partner of the firm where Josh works.
- Andie MacDowell as Margaret Henderson, Larry's deceased wife whose murder becomes the subject of the first season of the mockumentary.
- Adam Campbell as Dr. Shinewell, veterinarian/OBGYN for East Peck

== Episodes ==
Season	Episodes	Originally released	
Season	Episodes	First released	Last released
1	13	March 14, 2017	April 18, 2017
2	10	July 19, 2018	August 23, 2018

=== Season 1 (2017) ===
No. overall	No. in season	Title	Directed by	Written by	Original release date	Prod. code	US viewers (millions)
1	1	"Pilot" "Chapter 1: A Big Crime in a Small Town"	Jeffrey Blitz	Jeff Astrof & Matt Miller	March 14, 2017	T11.10106	5.92
Northeastern junior attorney Josh Segal arrives in East Peck, South Carolina to represent local poetry professor Larry Henderson, who is accused of murdering his current wife, Margaret, only during pre-trial. The case proves challenging as the client is somehow always making himself look guilty, and Josh quickly finds himself in competition with the determined, no holds barred prosecutor, Carol Anne Keane. Later, a shocking discovery regarding Larry's faithfulness causes his brother-in-law to turn on him and decide to finance the prosecution instead—forcing Josh alone to fully represent him—and everyone, except his daughter Summer, to (further) doubt his innocence.
2	2	"Chapter 2: A Wrench in the Case"	Jeffrey Blitz	Jeff Astrof	March 14, 2017	T12.15452	4.58
Josh starts his first duties as Larry's lead defense attorney: investigating the bloody handprint found in Larry's house, where Margaret was found dead, with the help of a DNA expert whom Anne brings and who suffers from a type of OCD; and sending Dwayne to Roanoke, Virginia to retrieve the body of Larry's first wife, who was allegedly murdered in the same manner as was Margaret, in order to get a proper autopsy... which ultimately becomes impossible to happen.
3	3	"Chapter 3: The Other Man"	Jeffrey Blitz	Bill Callahan	March 21, 2017	T12.15453	5.29
It is discovered that Margaret was having an affair, and the identity of the other man proves to be a shocker to everyone. Meanwhile, Larry becomes publicly humiliated at Margaret's funeral.
4	4	"Chapter 4: An Unwelcome Distraction"	Jennifer Celotta	Bill Martin & Mike Schiff	March 21, 2017	T12.15454	4.25
After the lead investigator of the murder—who is also the other man—is found comatose, Carol Anne uses this as an opportunity to bring frivolous charges against the defense, who may or may not be responsible for the incident.
5	5	"Chapter 5: Right-Hand Man"	Jeffrey Blitz	Craig Gerard & Matthew Zinman	March 28, 2017	T12.15455	4.25
Josh finds evidence that may link Margaret's brother to her murder; Dwayne tries to prove Josh that he can be the latter's valuable "right-hand man"; and Summer and Anne help Larry practice his testimony.
6	6	"Chapter 6: Secrets & Lies"	Ken Whittingham	Sherry Bilsing-Graham & Ellen Kreamer	March 28, 2017	T12.15456	3.23
Josh focuses on his new suspect; Larry insists on taking a lie detector test; Dwayne becomes a hometown celebrity as the man who found the arm in the lake; the team gets a new benefactor.
7	7	"Chapter 7: The Case Gets Big"	Dean Holland	Amy Aniobi	April 4, 2017	T12.15457	3.76
As Josh prepares for trial, his boss, Mr. Mankiewicz, reveals a gigantic hole in Josh's case; unsettled by his rift with his daughter, and Josh's boss being in town, Larry takes matters into his own hands.
8	8	"Chapter 8: A Change in Defense"	Matt Sohn	Story by : Kassia Miller; Teleplay by : Patrick Kang & Michael Levin	April 4, 2017	T12.15458	3.01
As the trial gets national attention, Josh's boss, Mr. Mankiewicz, decides to take over the case and suggests Larry plead insanity.
9	9	"Chapter 9: Opening Statements"	Rebecca Asher	Bill Callahan	April 11, 2017	T12.15459	3.64
Josh's strategy of making another suspect look guilty takes a blow; Anne and Dwayne investigate why Larry's former lover isn't on the prosecution's witness list.
10	10	"Chapter 10: A Hostile Jury"	Matt Sohn	Bill Martin & Mike Schiff	April 11, 2017	T12.15460	2.88
Josh tries to show the jury the real Larry when they visit the crime scene inside the Henderson home; Anne and Dwayne search for Margaret's cellphone.
11	11	"Chapter 11: Unusual Suspect"	Ryan Case	Craig Gerard & Matthew Zinman	April 13, 2017	T12.15461	2.67
Josh's defense suffers a major setback when Summer turns into a suspect; Josh must decide how much he's willing to sacrifice to get Larry his freedom.
12	12	"Chapter 12: The Defense Rests"	Matt Sohn	Jeff Astrof & Bill Callahan	April 18, 2017	T12.15462	3.79
As Josh focuses on making his final case before closing arguments, he takes a huge gamble and puts Larry on the stand.
13	13	"Chapter 13: The Verdict"	Jeffrey Blitz	Jeff Astrof	April 18, 2017	T12.15463	3.01
The jury has reached a verdict that Larry is guilty. However, Carol Anne Keane changes her mind about the death sentence and instead simply sends Larry to jail. Several months later, Josh is back in New York, still trying to figure out how Larry could actually be innocent. A particular piece of evidence appears that reveals Larry is innocent, and Margaret was in fact killed by a bird knocking her through the window.

=== Season 2: Lady, Killer (2018) ===
No. overall	No. in season	Title	Directed by	Written by	Original release date	Prod. code	US viewers (millions)
14	1	"Chapter 1: The Suitcase"	Jeffrey Blitz	Jeff Astrof	July 19, 2018	T12.15751	3.21
Josh is hired to represent Lavinia Peck-Foster, the First Lady of East Peck, who is accused of murdering her husband, Edgar, who was found in the trunk of Lavinia's car with freshwater in his lungs. Carol Anne is again the prosecutor, now heavily pregnant; she denies that Josh is necessarily the father, and claims to be uninterested in building a life with Josh, despite secretly obsessing over the details of such a relationship. Josh's investigation suggests that Edgar died during a gala party held in the Peck-Foster home; Lavinia's pool is saltwater, and Josh believes she was framed because she couldn't have drowned Edgar elsewhere during the party. Lavinia's parents and brother are dead; Josh concludes that Lavinia is lonely. Dwayne and Anne discover corpses in Lavinia's hedge maze.
15	2	"Chapter 2: The Timeline"	Jeffrey Blitz	Craig Gerard & Matthew Zinman	July 19, 2018	T12.15752	2.66
The corpses are centuries old, those of Dwayne's ancestors who built Lavinia's mansion. Judge Kamiltow requires Lavinia to stand trial, and rules it must be a bench trial due to unavoidable jury bias. Carol Anne posits that Lavinia drowned Edgar in the Peck River, adjacent to their property. Edgar was bludgeoned with a clock; Josh must consult with the town's only clock expert, Edgar's apprentice Jesse Ray Beaumont, who murdered Lavinia's brother Chet. In exchange for being interviewed by Nina Rudolph of popular podcast M-Towne, which is following the case, Jesse identifies the clock as belonging to the Jessup family of East Peck; since Lavinia's clocks are on North Peck time, this solidifies a timeline that would leave her only fifteen minutes to have transported Edgar's body, a seeming impossibility. Carol Anne and Josh have another tryst.
16	3	"Chapter 3: The Murder Clock"	Jeffrey Blitz	Liz Astrof	July 26, 2018	T12.15753	2.12
Josh's team continues to hunt for the potential murder weapon that would seal their timeline. The case takes a dramatic turn as their search leads them to two new suspects and some shocking news about Lavinia.
17	4	"Chapter 4: A Hole in the Case"	Yana Gorskaya	David Booth	July 26, 2018	T12.15754	1.76
As the trial begins, Josh and his team experience some hiccups. Just as Josh thinks has cause for dismissal of the case, a hidden passageway is discovered on Lavinia's property.
18	5	"Chapter 5: A Change in the Team"	Jeffrey Blitz	Patrick Kang & Michael Levin	August 9, 2018	T12.15755	1.91
After Dwayne testifies on the prosecution's behalf and dismantles the timeline they established, Lavinia pressures Josh to fire Dwayne. Dwayne redeems himself when he stumbles on a big break in the case leading to a shocking confession and Josh winning Lavinia's case.
19	6	"Chapter 6: New Case, Old Murder"	Jeffrey Blitz	Melanie Boysaw & Nora Nolan	August 9, 2018	T12.15756	1.37
In the aftermath of winning Lavinia's case, the town finally embraces Josh as a real Pecker. However, Josh agonizes over whether Lavinia may have done it.
20	7	"Chapter 7: A Family Affair"	Matt Sohn	Craig Gerard & Matthew Zinman	August 16, 2018	T12.15757	2.16
With the retrial of Jesse Ray Beaumont looming, the team digs into Lavinia's past to gain some fresh insight into the case.
21	8	"Chapter 8: Bad Instincts"	Matt Sohn	David Booth	August 16, 2018	T12.15758	1.73
With Lavinia eliminated as a suspect in Chet Peck's murder, Josh struggles with his defense for Jesse Ray Beaumont. Meanwhile, Dwayne enjoys his new life as a Peck.
22	9	"Chapter 9: A Big Break"	Jeffrey Blitz	Jeff Astrof	August 23, 2018	T12.15759	1.99
Josh and his team continue to find themselves at literal dead ends in their casework until they unearth game-changing evidence with the help of Jesse Ray Beaumont. Meanwhile, in court, Carol Anne tries to finish the case before she has the baby.
23	10	"Chapter 10: Barcelona"	Jeffrey Blitz	Jeff Astrof	August 23, 2018	T12.15760	1.62
As Jesse Ray Beaumont's trial begins, the team struggles to keep him under control while they discover more of Lavinia's secrets. Now that the baby is born and awaiting the DA election results, Carol Anne discovers who is the baby's father.

== Production ==
=== Development ===
In August 2015, it was announced that NBC had given the production, then titled The Trial, a put pilot commitment. The episode was set to be written and executive produced by Jeff Astrof and Matt Miller, from Warner Bros. Television. The following January, NBC gave the production an official pilot order, with Jeffrey Blitz set to direct the pilot episode. In May 2016, the production received a series order from NBC, now titled Trial & Error, with Barge Productions and Good Session Productions also serving as production companies. The first season premiered on March 14, 2017.

On May 20, 2017, Trial & Error was renewed for a second season consisting of ten episodes. The season features the subtitle Lady, Killer, and premiered on July 19, 2018. On August 7, 2018, NBC's option to renew the series for a potential third season had expired, with the rights reverting to Warner Bros. Television. Although the main cast's contracts had yet to expire, the series was being shopped around to other networks and streaming services. The series was officially cancelled on January 16, 2019 after Warner Bros. failed to find a new broadcaster for the series. Warner Bros. remained "open to continuing the series should an opportunity arise in the future."

=== Casting ===
In February 2016, it was announced that Steven Boyer, John Lithgow, Sherri Shepherd, Jayma Mays, Nicholas D'Agosto, and Krysta Rodriguez had joined the main cast of the pilot. The main cast all returned for the second season, except Lithgow, who only had a single season commitment to the series, and Rodriguez. NBC chairman Bob Greenblatt felt there was potential for Lithgow to appear in a couple episodes of the second season, though his eventual appearances were by way of archived footage from the first season. Kristin Chenoweth was cast in February 2018 as the new character accused of murder and set to stand trial. Amanda Payton also joins the cast for the second season as the host of a podcast covering the new trial.

=== Filming ===
The second season filmed from March 19 to May 22, 2018, in Vancouver, after the first season was filmed in Burbank, California.

== Broadcast ==
Internationally, the series was acquired in Australia by the Seven Network where it premiered on April 30, 2017, and in New Zealand by TVNZ.

== Reception ==
=== Critical response ===
On Rotten Tomatoes, the first season has an approval rating of 86% based on 35 reviews, with an average rating of 6.85/10. The site's critical consensus reads, "Trial & Error hilariously parodies the true-crime genre with consistent laughs, irreverently funny 'stupid humor,' and animated characters who populate the show's dependably entertaining narratives." On Metacritic, the first season has a score of 67 out of 100, based on 29 critics, indicating "generally favorable reviews".

On Rotten Tomatoes, the second season has an approval rating of 91% based on 11 reviews, with an average rating of 7.78/10. The sites critical consensus reads, "As a quirky courtroom satire Trial & Error continues to delight, but its best motion may be allowing the singular Kristin Chenoweth to shine in all of her whimsically manic glory as the titular Lady, Killer". On Metacritic, the second season has a score of 76 out of 100, based on 11 critics, indicating "generally favorable reviews".

=== Ratings ===
==== Overall ====
Viewership and ratings per season of Trial & Error
Season	Timeslot (ET)	Episodes	First aired		Last aired		TV season	Viewership rank	Avg. viewers (millions)
Season	Timeslot (ET)	Episodes	Date	Viewers (millions)	Date	Viewers (millions)	TV season	Viewership rank	Avg. viewers (millions)
1	Tuesday 10:00 p.m. (1, 12); Tuesday 10:30 p.m. (2, 13); Tuesday 9:00 p.m. (3, 5, 7, 9); Tuesday 9:30 p.m. (4, 6, 8, 10); Thursday 8:00 p.m. (11)	13	March 14, 2017	5.92	April 18, 2017	3.01	2016–17	TBD	TBD
2	Thursday 9:00 p.m. (1, 3, 5, 7, 9); Thursday 9:30 p.m. (2, 4, 6, 8, 10)	10	July 19, 2018	3.21	August 23, 2018	1.62	2017–18	TBD	TBD

==== Season 1 ====
Viewership and ratings per episode of Trial & Error
No.	Title	Air date	Rating (18–49)	Viewers (millions)
1	"Pilot"	March 14, 2017	1.4/5	5.92
2	"A Wrench in the Case"	March 14, 2017	1.0/4	4.58
3	"The Other Man"	March 21, 2017	1.2/5	5.29
4	"An Unwelcome Distraction"	March 21, 2017	1.1/4	4.25
5	"Right-Hand Man"	March 28, 2017	1.0/4	4.25
6	"Secrets & Lies"	March 28, 2017	0.8/3	3.23
7	"The Case Gets Bigger"	April 4, 2017	0.9/3	3.76
8	"A Change in Defense"	April 4, 2017	0.7/3	3.01
9	"Opening Statements"	April 11, 2017	0.9/3	3.64
10	"A Hostile Jury"	April 11, 2017	0.8/3	2.88
11	"Unusual Suspect"	April 13, 2017	0.6/2	2.67
12	"The Defense Rests"	April 18, 2017	0.9/3	3.79
13	"The Verdict"	April 18, 2017	0.7/3	3.01

==== Season 2: Lady, Killer ====
Viewership and ratings per episode of Trial & Error
No.	Title	Air date	Rating/share (18–49)	Viewers (millions)	DVR (18–49)	DVR viewers (millions)	Total (18–49)	Total viewers (millions)
1	"The Suitcase"	July 19, 2018	0.6/3	3.21	0.3	0.76	0.9	3.97
2	"The Timeline"	July 19, 2018	0.5/2	2.66	0.2	0.73	0.7	3.39
3	"The Murder Clock"	July 26, 2018	0.4/2	2.12	0.2	0.58	0.6	2.70
4	"A Hole in the Case"	July 26, 2018	0.4/2	1.76	0.2	0.57	0.6	2.33
5	"A Change in the Team"	August 9, 2018	0.4/2	1.91	—N/a	—N/a	—N/a	—N/a
6	"New Case, Old Murder"	August 9, 2018	0.3/1	1.37	—N/a	—N/a	—N/a	—N/a
7	"A Family Affair"	August 16, 2018	0.5/2	2.16	0.2	0.59	0.7	2.75
8	"Bad Instincts"	August 16, 2018	0.4/2	1.73	0.2	0.55	0.6	2.29
9	"A Big Break"	August 23, 2018	0.4/2	1.99	TBD	TBD	TBD	TBD
10	"Barcelona"	August 23, 2018	0.4/2	1.62	TBD	TBD	TBD	TBD

=== Accolades ===
Year	Award	Category	Recipients and nominees	Result
2018	Satellite Awards	Best Actor in a Series, Comedy or Musical	John Lithgow	Nominated
2018	Writers Guild of America Awards	Episodic Comedy (For episode "The Verdict")	Jeff Astrof	Nominated
