= The Fix (2018 TV series) =

Comedy panel show on Netflix

- Genre: Comedy panel show
- Directed by: Ryan Polito
- Presented by: Jimmy Carr
- Starring: D. L. Hughley; Katherine Ryan; Mona Chalabi
- Country of origin: United States
- Original language: English
- No. of seasons: 1
- No. of episodes: 10

Production
- Executive producers: Andrew Westwell; Jimmy Carr; Michael Davies; Michael Naidus; Jordan Watland; Mohammed Ali
- Camera setup: Multi-camera
- Running time: 23–30 minutes
- Production companies: Embassy Row; Netflix Studios

Original release
- Network: Netflix
- Release: December 14, 2018

The Fix is an American television comedy panel show hosted by Jimmy Carr, starring D. L. Hughley and Katherine Ryan as team captains and Mona Chalabi as a statistician. The show premiered on December 14, 2018, on Netflix.

== Premise ==
In The Fix, host Jimmy Carr and team captains D. L. Hughley and Katherine Ryan are joined by guest comics who, in teams, "debate and discuss" solutions to "one of the biggest challenges facing the world", with help from data expert Mona Chalabi. Chalabi will reveal "surprising, shocking and often hilarious" facts before each team proposes their fix to the studio audience, who will in turn vote for their favourite fix.

== Cast ==
- Jimmy Carr as Host
- D. L. Hughley as Team Captain
- Katherine Ryan as Team Captain
- Mona Chalabi as Correspondent and Statistician

== Season 1 ==
Each episode features two possible solutions for an issue. Solutions in bold were the most voted by the audience.
Episode	Issue	Teams	Solution
01	Social Network Addiction	D. L. Hughley and Michael Ian Black	Internet Licence
01	Social Network Addiction	Katherine Ryan and Nikki Glaser	**Slow down the Internet**
02	Immigration	D. L. Hughley and Al Madrigal	**Revamp current Immigration Test**
02	Immigration	Katherine Ryan and Joel Kim Booster	E!-Migrants Celebrity Show
03	Artificial Intelligence	D. L. Hughley and Fortune Feimster	**Mediocre Operating Robot Outreach 'Nitiative**
03	Artificial Intelligence	Katherine Ryan and Ron Funches	Make Robots Horny
04	Gentrification	D. L. Hughley and Moshe Kasher	SoCaBo
04	Gentrification	Katherine Ryan and Nicole Byer	**Home A-Loan**
05	Population ageing	D. L. Hughley and Al Madrigal	Close Down Florida
05	Population ageing	Katherine Ryan and Whitney Cummings	**Make America Pregnant Again**
06	Wage Gap	D. L. Hughley and Nikki Glaser	Dadi-Care
06	Wage Gap	Katherine Ryan and Nicole Byer	**Feminism-ism**
07	Global warming	D. L. Hughley and Ron Funches	Explode a Volcano
07	Global warming	Katherine Ryan and Sasheer Zamata	**Vegan Rebranding**
08	Gun control	D. L. Hughley and Sarah Tiana	**Everyone Joins the NRA**
08	Gun control	Katherine Ryan and Clayton English	Arms & Noble
09	Opioid Crisis	D. L. Hughley and Sara Schaefer	**Mandatory Opioid Ads**
09	Opioid Crisis	Katherine Ryan and Amanda Seales	Pharma Drug Dealers
10	Wealth Gap	D. L. Hughley and Howie Mandel	**EgoFundMe**
10	Wealth Gap	Katherine Ryan and Aparna Nancherla	The Garage Growth Initiative

== Release ==
=== Marketing ===
On November 16, 2018, the first trailer for the series was released.
