= Ready to Mingle (TV series) =

British reality television show

Ready to Mingle is a British reality television dating show presented by Katherine Ryan. It premiered on ITV2 on 6 September 2021. The show features twelve men competing for one woman's love, but there's a twist: not all of them are single. The men who are in relationships are all pretending otherwise, in the hopes of winning a cash prize. However, it is the woman's job to find out who's taken and who's single with the hopes of sharing the £50,000 prize fund with a single boy.

The show premiered to 120,000 viewers on ITV2. The series finale on 24 September saw the chooser, Sophia, selecting contestant Drew.
