= Your Face or Mine? =

- Genre: Game show
- Presented by: Jimmy Carr; June Sarpong (2002–2003); Katherine Ryan (2017–2019)
- Country of origin: United Kingdom
- Original language: English
- No. of series: 8
- No. of episodes: 111

Production
- Running time: 30 minutes (inc. adverts)
- Production company: Talkback

Original release
- Network: E4
- Release: 2 September 2002 – 23 May 2003
- Network: Comedy Central
- Release: 17 May 2017 – 12 December 2019

Your Face or Mine? is a British comedy game show that originally aired on E4 from September 2002 to May 2003, hosted by Jimmy Carr and June Sarpong. Comedy Central revived the show in 2017 with Carr and Katherine Ryan as co-hosts. The revived series ran for 66 episodes from May 2017 to December 2019.

== Format ==
=== Round 1 ===
Two contestants, usually a couple, have to choose who they think are the most attractive when presented with photos of two random individuals (the people in these pictures are also usually in the audience). If their choice matches with that of the audience, they win money.

=== Round 2 ===
The contestants then have to choose who is the most attractive out of two celebrities, again winning cash if their opinion matches that of the audience.

=== Round 3 ===
A special guest (of which there are four usually consisting of a stranger, friends, workmates, and sometimes a celebrity) joins the contestants and they have to decide who is more attractive between the special guest and one of the contestants. If their choice matches with that of the audience, they win money.

=== Round 4 ===
Lastly, the two contestants have to decide who is the most attractive out of each other, winning if they guessed the same as the audience.

== Episodes ==
=== E4 ===
Series	Start date	End date	Episodes
1	2 September 2002	27 September 2002	20
2	21 April 2003	23 May 2003	25

=== Comedy Central ===
Series	Start date	End date	Episodes
1	17 May 2017	12 July 2017	10
2	4 October 2017	20 December 2017	12
3	21 March 2018	23 May 2018	10
4	3 October 2018	19 December 2018	12
5	27 February 2019	8 May 2019	11
6	2 October 2019	11 December 2019	11
