= Crongton =

- Genre: Comedy-drama
- Created by: Archie Maddocks
- Based on: Crongton series by Alex Wheatle
- Composer: Swindle
- Country of origin: United Kingdom
- Original language: English
- No. of series: 1
- No. of episodes: 10

Production
- Executive producers: Willow Grylls; Imogen O'Sullivan; Elaine Pyke
- Producer: Joanna Hanley
- Cinematography: Bani Mendy
- Production company: New Pictures

Original release
- Network: BBC iPlayer
- Release: 24 March 2025

Crongton is a British teen comedy-drama television series based on Alex Wheatle's book series of the same name, adapted by Archie Maddocks for BBC iPlayer. The series premiered on 24 March 2025.

Crongton received a number of accolades, including a British Academy Television Award.

== Cast ==
- Samson Agboola as Lemar "Liccle Bit" Jackson
- Nielle Springer as Venetia King
- Noah Cox as Mckay Tambo
- Seyi Andes-Pelumi as Jonah "Rapid" Hani
- Safia Hamad as Saira Alzuhur
- Sophie Spatariu as Juniper Petrescu
- Bobby North as Boy from the Hills
- Seraphina Beh as Elaine
- Bunmi Osadolor as Manjaro
- Savannah Steyn as Mo
- Kéllé Bryan as Mum
- Sutara Gayle as Gran
- Toussaint Meghie as Dad

=== Guest ===
- Eddie Kadi
- Michelle de Swarte
- Munya Chawawa

== Production ==
Unstoppable Film and Television initially optioned the rights to adapt Alex Wheatle's Crongton book series for the BBC, but the project was shelved in 2021 amid sexual misconduct allegations against Unstoppable's Noel Clarke. In 2023, the rights passed to New Pictures. Archie Maddocks would pen the scripts, while Willow Grylls, Imogen O'Sullivan and Elaine Pyke served as executive producers, and Joanna Hanley served as a producer. The 10 25-minute episode series titled Crongton was officially commissioned by BBC Children's for BBC iPlayer in January 2024.

Casting was announced in December 2024, with Samson Agboola set to lead the series alongside Nielle Springer, Noah Cox, Seyi Andes-Pelumi, Safia Hamad, Sophie Spatariu and Bobby North as well as Seraphina Beh, Bunmi Osadolor and Savannah Steyn. Also joining the cast were Kéllé Bryan, Sutara Gayle and Toussaint Meghie. Eddie Kadi, Michelle de Swarte and Munya Chawawa would make guest appearances.

Principal photography took place in Leeds in 2024.

== Reception ==
=== Awards and nominations ===
Year	Award	Category	Nominee	Result	Ref.
2025	National Film Awards UK	Best Actress in a TV Series	Nielle Springer	Won	
2025	Venice TV Awards	Children / Youth	Crongton	Won	
2025	Rose d'Or	Children and Youth	Crongton	Nominated	
2026	Broadcast Awards	Best children's programme	Crongton	Won	
2026	British Academy Television Awards	Best Children's: Scripted	Crongton	Won	
