= Dynasty: The Making of a Guilty Pleasure =

- European DVD cover
- Genre: Docudrama
- Written by: Matthew Miller
- Directed by: Matthew Miller
- Starring: Pamela Reed; Melora Hardin; Ritchie Singer; Bartholomew John; Alice Krige
- Music by: Richard Marvin
- Countries of origin: Australia; United States
- Original language: English

Production
- Executive producers: Greg Gugliotta; Stanley M. Brooks; Damian Ganczewski; Frank von Zerneck; Robert M. Sertner
- Producer: Randy Sutter
- Cinematography: John Stokes
- Editor: Sandra Montiel
- Running time: 90 minutes

Original release
- Network: ABC
- Release: January 2, 2005

Dynasty: The Making of a Guilty Pleasure is a 2005 American drama television film written and directed by Matthew Miller, based on the creation and behind the scenes production of the 1980s prime time soap opera Dynasty. It was broadcast on ABC on January 2, 2005.

== Plot ==
The film begins with the following disclaimer:

The following dramatization includes time compression and composite and fictionalized characters and incidents.

In 1980, ABC development executive Vince Peterson meets with producer Aaron Spelling, looking for a series featuring "greed and manipulation and sex and power and vanity" to battle against CBS' hit nighttime serial Dallas and make it "look like Sesame Street." Writers Richard and Esther Shapiro are already developing their own modern take on I, Claudius, and Dynasty is conceived. From the beginning, Esther's intent to explore "real social issues" and not have the show be an "inane soap with beautiful people and beautiful clothes" clashes with the network and advertisers' squeamishness with homosexual character Steven, "the first openly gay character on a prime time drama series." John Forsythe—the voice of Charlie's Angels' Charlie—and Linda Evans are cast as Blake and Krystle Carrington. With the new series at #40 in the ratings, ABC pushes for Steven to be "cured," and Richard conceives a female J. R. Ewing: Blake's bitter ex-wife Alexis. Soon Dynasty welcomes Heather Locklear as sexpot Sammy Jo, and Joan Collins as villainess Alexis.

Ratings rise as Alexis tears her way through Dynasty and Sammy Jo makes Steven reconsider same-sex romance. Steven's portrayer Al Corley, annoyed at the direction his character is taking, asks "Hey, I'm not gay... but correct me if I'm wrong, is homosexuality a disease that can be cured by a blonde bimbo in Daisy Duke shorts?" and is soon replaced. Stuck at #2—despite the tease of an affair by Krystle with guest star Rock Hudson—Dynasty becomes "the most expensive show in history" and spawns a spin-off series. The Moldavian wedding massacre finally drives the show to #1 as the world learns that Rock Hudson has AIDS. Collins wants more money for "putting the 'nasty' in Dynasty," but Esther plays hardball to prove that everyone is replaceable. Ratings begin to slide in the aftermath of the Moldavia storyline, and by the seventh season ABC is talking about cancellation. Esther files a profit-seeking lawsuit when news surfaces of Aaron's plans for Spelling Entertainment to go public. Long unhappy with storyline quality, John finally explodes; Joan faces the public spectacle over her divorce. Realizing that the important things in life are passing her by, Linda decides she needs to leave Dynasty, and a supportive Joan wishes her well. Season nine ends with Blake and Alexis in mortal peril, but few viewers. ABC unceremoniously cancels the show—"the '80s are over."

Wanting to give the fans a proper ending, Esther, Richard and Aaron approach ABC about a reunion movie. The network is reluctant, but Aaron's influence prevails. The cast happily return at reduced salaries; when asked if she wants a stunt double for Alexis' final catfight with Krystle, Joan quips, "What the hell—for a few shots I'd like to get in this time!" All depart smiling, knowing they have made history.

== Cast ==
=== Main ===
- Pamela Reed as Esther Shapiro
- John Terry as Vince Peterson
- Melora Hardin as Linda Evans (Krystle Carrington)
- Ritchie Singer as Richard Shapiro
- Nicholas Hammond as Aaron Spelling
- John Atkinson as Les Markowitz
- Bartholomew John as John Forsythe (Blake Carrington)
- Alice Krige as Joan Collins (Alexis Colby)

=== Additional ===
- Rel Hunt as Al Corley (Steven Carrington)
- Holly Brisley as Heather Locklear (Sammy Jo Carrington)
- John Gregg as Lloyd Bochner (Cecil Colby)
- Rory Williamson as Michael Nader (Dex Dexter)
- Rachael Taylor as Catherine Oxenberg (Amanda Carrington)
- Robert Coleby as Rock Hudson (Daniel Reece)
- Julian Garner as Peter Holm
- Phillip Hinton as Leonard Goldenson
- Anna Lee as Candy Spelling
- Nick Tsakonas as Yanni
- Troy Planet as Lou
- Felicity Price as Dottie
- Lewis Fitz-Gerald as Winston Fletcher

== Reception and criticism ==
The film received mixed reviews both for content and for historical accuracy, and was criticized by all three of Dynasty's leads—John Forsythe, Linda Evans, and Joan Collins — in separate press releases. The New York Times called it "funny" and "less satirical than it has been billed" with "some serious moments, which it doesn't overplay."

As noted in the film itself, dramatic license is taken with both the historical timeline and events, as well as the fictional storylines originally presented on Dynasty. It was produced primarily in Australia, with several non-American cast members.
