= Mona Chalabi =

British data journalist (born 1987)

Mona Chalabi RDI
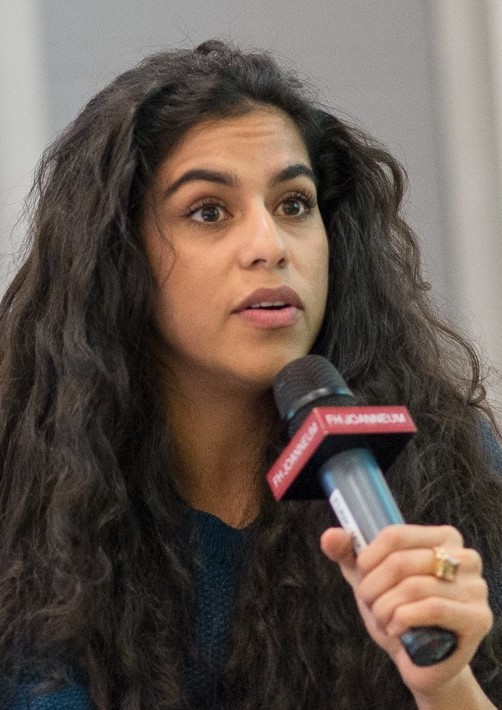
- Education: University of Edinburgh; Paris Institute of Political Studies
- Occupations: Data journalist Writer; Illustrator
- Website: monachalabi.com

Mona Chalabi (born 1987) is a British, Pulitzer Prize-winning data journalist, illustrator and writer of Iraqi descent, known for her articles in The New York Times and The Guardian.

== Early life and education ==
Chalabi was born in 1987 in London to Iraqi immigrants. She grew up in East London where she was educated at Woodford County High School For Girls. She received an undergraduate degree in International Relations from the University of Edinburgh and earned a master's degree in International Security from the Paris Institute of Political Studies in Paris, France.

== Career ==
After working for the Bank of England, the Economist Intelligence Unit and the International Organization for Migration, as of 2024, Chalabi works for The Guardian US. She advocates the importance of data journalism in working to holding politicians accountable for making false claims and calling out media bias. Her written work covers many diverse interests such as racial dating preferences and research on Wikipedia.

=== Television and radio ===
In 2015, Chalabi presented a television documentary on racism in the United Kingdom for the BBC. For National Public Radio she produced the Number of the Week. Chalabi has made several appearances on Neil deGrasse Tyson's StarTalk. In 2016, Chalabi and Mae Ryan created the four-part TV documentary series Vagina Dispatches about physical, social, and political aspects around women's bodies. The video series was nominated for a 38th Annual News & Documentary Emmy Award in the category New Approaches: Arts, Lifestyle & Culture in 2017.

In 2017, she joined Richard Osman as a data presenter for Channel 4's Alternative Election Night, and was interviewed on The Weekly with Charlie Pickering. She also began hosting The Business of Life, a finance talk show on Viceland. Chalabi presented her TED talk 3 ways to spot a bad statistic in early 2017. In 2018, Chalabi launched the podcast series Strange Bird. She is a former regular guest on Frankie Boyle's New World Order and has appeared as a guest panelist on BBC TV's satirical show Have I Got News For You. In 2018, Mona joined American comedy panel show The Fix as a data expert, presenting her data illustrations.

In 2020, Chalabi received the Shorty Award in the category Best Journalist in Social Media. Chalabi was also recognized among Fortune's 40 Under 40 in Media and Entertainment in 2020.

In 2022, Chalabi launched a podcast with TED, Am I Normal? With Mona Chalabi, exploring everyday questions through the lens of data. The podcast covers questions such as "do I have enough friends? Should it take me this long to get over my ex? Should I move or stay where I am?". The topics are explored using spreadsheets, studies and by consulting experts.

=== Illustrated data ===
Chalabi's piece "100 New Yorkers" was displayed at the Westfield World Trade Center in late 2020. The work was a demographic representation of the city distilled into 100 characters (e.g. 68 of the illustrations were people of color because, at the time, 68% of the city was people of color).

In 2020, she was appointed an Honorary Fellow of the British Science Association. That year, fellowships were granted to those who made an outstanding contribution to public engagement and science communication in the context of the COVID-19 pandemic. To understand New York's trees, Chalabi was given access to the steps outside the Brooklyn Museum. She created a large-scale vinyl installation showing the 100 most common trees in the city. The work underscored patterns of inequality (neighborhoods with less money have fewer trees) and also health consequences (trees can reduce COVID-19 transmission rates).

In November 2023, Chalabi was awarded the Pulitzer Prize for Illustrated reporting and Commentary for her New York Times Magazine piece "9 Ways to Imagine Jeff Bezos' Wealth". At the award ceremony, Chalabi called out fellow journalists for their unwillingness to say the word "Palestine". She donated her $15,000 prize money to the Palestinian Journalist Syndicate to help fight what she sees as an "asymmetry" of information that elevates Israeli voices over Palestinian ones in the media, criticizing how media companies were covering the violence in Gaza. Since October 2023, Chalabi continually highlighted the biases in reporting on Israel and Palestine on major news platforms like BBC and The New York Times. Her data journalism has covered subjects such as "Countries that recognize Palestine as a state", "US Representatives who have invested in Weapons manufacturers that are arming Israel", "Orchestrated Famine", and more.

Chalabi is an executive producer, writer, and creative director on Ramy Youssef's animated series 1 Happy Family USA. The series premiered in April 2025, on Amazon Prime Video.

On November 28, 2025, she was named a Royal Designer for Industry by the Royal Society for Arts (RSA) in Great Britain. This distinction is awarded to creative individuals "who have achieved sustained design excellence and made a significant contribution to society through design."

=== Ten Lives ===
Ten Lives: How What We Have Shapes Who We Are was published in 2026. The book is about Chalabi's experience with her finances and following ten other people who vary in their economic circumstances over the course of five years.

== Awards and recognition ==
Chalabi received the Pulitzer Prize for Illustrated Reporting and Commentary in 2023 for "striking illustrations that combine statistical reporting with keen analysis to help readers understand the immense wealth and economic power of Amazon founder Jeff Bezos."

She was nominated for a News & Documentary Emmy Award in the Category New Approaches: Arts, Lifestyle & Culture in 2017 and received the 2020 Shorty Award in the category Best Journalist in Social Media.

She was appointed to the Royal Designers for Industry (RDI) by the Royal Society for Arts (RSA) in 2025.

== Exhibitions ==
- 2013: Photographs by Numbers; Arab British Center, Digital photography
- 2018: Amnesty International Poster Exhibit; Print
- 2019: Women Who Make Art Tate Gallery; Animated Installation
- 2019: The Worst Landlord in New York; Data Through Design, 3D Model Installation
- 2019: W. E. B. Du Bois: Charting Black Lives; House of Illustration, Paintings
- 2020: 100 New Yorkers; World Trade Center, Partnership with Lower Manhattan Cultural Council and Absolut Art, Art Installation
- 2020: Who Are You Here To See?; Design Museum, Paint
- 2021: Talking Climate Beyond Lies; The Climate Museum, Participatory Arts Campaign
- 2022: The Gray-Green Divide; The Brooklyn Museum, Art Installation
- 2022: Squeeze; Contemporary Art Museum, St. Louis, Art Installation
