= Ride or Die (2026 TV series) =

2026 Amazon Prime TV series

- Genre: Action; Adventure; Comedy
- Created by: Tessa Coates
- Showrunner: Matt Miller
- Starring: Octavia Spencer; Hannah Waddingham; Ed Skrein; Calam Lynch; Savannah Steyn; Jamie Parker; Sylvia Hoeks; Bill Nighy; Jacky Ido
- Music by: Isabella Summers
- Country of origin: United States
- Original language: English
- No. of seasons: 1
- No. of episodes: 8

Production
- Executive producers: Andy Muschietti; Barbara Muschietti; Irene Yeung; Brian Clisham; Stephanie Kluft; David Ellison; Dana Goldberg; Matt Thunell; Hannah Waddingham; Octavia Spencer; Peyton Reed; Tessa Coates; Matt Miller
- Producer: Holger Reibiger
- Cinematography: Dani Vilar; Craig Wrobleski; David Luther
- Editors: Matthew Barber; Erin Deck; Roderick Deogrades; Kevin Mock; Quentin Holmes
- Running time: 48–55 minutes
- Production companies: Melodie Productions; Orit Entertainment; Good Session; Spring Tide Productions; Double Dream; Paramount Television Studios; Amazon MGM Studios

Original release
- Network: Amazon Prime Video
- Release: July 15, 2026

Ride or Die is an American action adventure comedy television series. It was created by Tessa Coates and stars Hannah Waddingham, Octavia Spencer, and Bill Nighy. The series premiered on July 15, 2026, on Amazon Prime Video. In September 2026, the series was canceled after one season.

== Premise ==
Two friends go on the run from a mysterious enemy. One is secretly a highly trained assassin.

== Cast and characters ==
=== Main ===
- Hannah Waddingham as Judith Burton, an elite assassin and Debbie's best friend
- Octavia Spencer as Deborah "Debbie" Claybourne, an American wife of a member of Parliament (MP) and Judith's best friend
- Ed Skrein as Billy Donovan, a member of a crime syndicate
- Calam Lynch as Sam, Judith's handler
- Savannah Steyn as Queenie, Judith's tech and weapons specialist
- Jamie Parker as David, Debbie's husband and an MP
- Sylvia Hoeks as Ana, a fellow assassin and former friend of Judith's
- Bill Nighy as The Director, Judith's employer
- Jacky Ido as Jacques, an Interpol agent

=== Recurring ===
- Cathy Tyson as Diane Williams, Queenie’s mother who is training her daughter to take over the assassin support “shop”
- Kathryn Drysdale as Amanda, The Director's assistant
- Camille Chamoux as Colette, French police officer

== Episodes ==
No.	Title	Directed by	Written by	Original release date
1	"The Book of Judith"	Peyton Reed	Tessa Coates	July 15, 2026
Judith Burton, a veteran British assassin codenamed Whiptail, is urged by her employer, The Agency, to retire due to her actions in recent missions. Judith spends her free time with her American best friend Debbie Claybourne, who works tirelessly to support the career of her British MP husband David. Before a charity gala, David informs Debbie of his intention to get a divorce, and Debbie gets heavily drunk. At the same gala, Judith is sent to kill crime boss Billy Donovan, but instead finds David dead in Billy’s room, along with several bodyguards. The assassin leaves behind a postcard depicting a graveyard. Judith realises the danger to Debbie and helps her escape. At the graveyard, Judith finds a page of the Book of Judith with a black mark, warning of her impending death. Debbie discovers Judith’s assassin identity. Later, an assassin kills a graveyard attendant who assisted Judith.
2	"The Yellow Wood"	Peyton Reed	Tessa Coates	July 15, 2026
In 2001, Debbie and Judith meet for the first time when Judith takes Debbie home after her car breaks down, although as cover after a mission. In the present, Debbie discovers a cover-up of the gala murders, while Judith confronts the Director of her Agency about the black mark, and hunts down Billy. Debbie searches her home and discovers David’s links to Billy and an Albanian crime syndicate, led by Ergon Kreshnik. Debbie interrupts a meeting between Billy and the Albanians, learning that David stole £24 million from Kreshnik. Debbie is kidnapped by the Albanians, sparking a car chase in which she incapacitates her captors and is saved by Judith. Judith enlists the help of her handler, Sam, assassin supplier Mrs Williams and her daughter, Queenie, to create new identities and track Billy. Sam is seduced by the graveyard assassin, and the Director orders Debbie’s death when he realises she knows about the Agency.
3	"Strangers on a Train"	DeMane Davis	Matt Miller & Katherine Kearns	July 15, 2026
In 1997, Debbie meets David while Interrailing in London, deciding against her plan to become a public defender in the United States. In the present, Debbie and Judith mistake a generous motorist for a pursuer when their car suffers a flat tyre in France. They board a luxury train from Calais to northern Spain, arguing over Judith’s deception. The graveyard assassin, Ana, bugs Sam’s phone to determine Debbie and Judith’s location, which she shares with Kreshnik. Judith kills an assassin sent by The Agency to kill Debbie, and they are forced to jump off the moving train. After accidentally leaving their supplies behind, Debbie and Judith hitchhike towards Spain. Sam and Queenie discover that David is not dead, and that he had been secretly moved out of Billy’s room by Ana. Debbie learns that her children have been receiving texts from David, who is being held captive by Ana.
4	"The Spanish Prisoner"	DeMane Davis	Liz Friedman	July 15, 2026
Judith convinces the Director to cancel the hit on Debbie if she can kill Billy within 24 hours. Ana tortures David into disclosing Debbie and Judith’s relationship and the stolen money. Kreshnik’s son Spiro and Interpol agent Jacques Boucher search the train and discover Debbie and Judith’s fake passports. In Spain, with help from travellers, Debbie and Judith track Billy to a nightclub, where Judith fights off Billy’s rival drug gang. Debbie and Judith kidnap and interrogate Billy, who reveals that David was paid £24 million by Kreshnik to prevent a transport bill that hindered their interests from passing through Parliament. Upset that David had tried to block a bill she was highly involved in, Debbie sleeps with a traveller who later helps her escape. Sam and Queenie break into the Director’s office and find that Ana, codenamed Redback, apparently died 5 years ago. Judith decides against killing Billy and leaves the Agency, escaping from Spain together with Debbie.
5	"The Count of Monte Carlo"	Allison Liddi-Brown	Laura Jacqmin	July 15, 2026
Debbie, Judith and Billy travel to Monaco to track the money with the help of former allies Brian and Elijah. The Director and Mrs Williams investigate Ana, who has been held in a Turkish prison for the last 5 years. The Director prevents anyone from informing Judith of Ana’s return, given Judith’s departure. In order to repay Kreshnik, Debbie, Judith and Billy plan to steal antiques at a party hosted by arms dealer Arnand, one of Judith’s previous targets. Jacques tracks Debbie on the orders of his Interpol superior Colette, who is also his ex-wife, while Spiro tracks Debbie to Monaco. At Arnand’s party, Judith seduces Arnand, allowing Debbie and Billy to steal the antiques. Jacques arrives at the party and urges Debbie to assist Interpol. Spiro exposes Judith to Arnand, resulting in her being tortured. Debbie starts a fire to distract the Albanians. In the ensuing fight, Judith is stabbed by Spiro.
6	"Moonlight on the Bosphorus"	Allison Liddi-Brown	Alison Barton & Bonnie Dennison and Katherine Kearns	July 15, 2026
Debbie, Judith and Billy escape the party and are saved from the Albanians by an assassin sent by Sam, who informs them of Ana’s return. Ana kills Mrs Williams, devastating Queenie and the Director. Brian operates on Judith, and the group hide while Judith recuperates. Judith reveals that Ana had formerly been her friend. However, when Ana had tried to silence Debbie after meeting her together with Judith before a mission in Turkey, Judith had opted to kill Ana. In the present, Debbie tricks Jacques into delivering medical supplies for Judith, and Ana and Kreshnik exchange information on David and Debbie’s locations. Sam and Queenie find and free David before the Albanians arrive. Jacques, Spiro and Interpol find the group, creating a confrontation in which Judith kills Spiro, and Debbie hands herself in to allow Judith and Billy’s escape. Ana publicly murders an assassin sent by the Agency.
7	"The Geneva Convention"	Lauren Wolkstein	Tessa Coates & Matt Miller	July 15, 2026
Debbie negotiates legal immunity with Interpol if she recovers the money from a bank in Geneva and draws out Kreshnik. Meanwhile, Judith, Billy, Sam and Queenie plan to make David withdraw the money in person, and Ana learns of the account from Elijah. Debbie and Judith share intimate moments with Jacques and Billy, respectively. Debbie and David arrive at the bank at the same time. Ana activates hidden smoke bombs, causing a shootout between Interpol agents and Kreshnik’s gang, leaving Judith injured and Kreshnik dead. During the commotion, Ana kills Billy and kidnaps Debbie. Instead of killing her, Ana makes Debbie watch Judith’s debriefing tapes, in which Judith coldly describes Debbie as her cover and states that she had accessed Debbie's computer and had deleted an email with a significant job offer. When Ana escapes, Sam refuses to shoot her, enraging Queenie. Judith watches as Debbie is left heartbroken, leading Debbie to reveal Judith’s identity to Interpol, and Judith to rejoin the Agency.
8	"The Song of Deborah"	Allison Liddi-Brown	Tessa Coates & Matt Miller	July 15, 2026
David and other MPs are prosecuted for corruption. Queenie discovers notes from her mother, revealing that the Director is her unknown father. Judith tries to convince Debbie that their friendship was genuine, but Debbie berates her for betrayal. Judith searches an old Agency training facility, where she discovers that all of the Agency’s assassins were orphans who were recruited as children. Ana forces the Director to choose between exposing the Agency or agreeing that she should kill Judith; he chooses the latter. Ana straps Judith inside an abandoned furnace, telling her that a drug will keep her alive but incapacitated and suffering. Judith intentionally dislodges her oxygen supply, and she starts to suffocate. She is rescued by Debbie, who has arrived at the training facility after searching Judith’s apartment. They escape by car, chased by Ana. Unable to outrun Ana, they use a grapple to drag her car off a cliff, jumping clear just in time. Ana is killed. The Director forces Sam to stay at the Agency, with Queenie as his new operative, although she secretly intends to work with Jacques and Colette to investigate the organisation. Debbie divorces David and pursues a new career as a barrister. Debbie and Judith travel together on a Eurostar towards their new destinations, followed by multiple foreign agents.

== Production ==
The series was created by Tessa Coates, who began developing it in 2023.

In February 2025, it was announced that Matt Miller would serve as showrunner and Peyton Reed would direct the first two episodes of the series. In addition to starring, Octavia Spencer and Hannah Waddingham serve as executive producers with Coates, Miller and Reed, with Andy Muschietti, Barbara Muschietti, Irene Yeung, Ben Spencer, Brian Clisham, and Stephanie Kluft. Alongside Spencer and Waddingham, the cast is led by Bill Nighy, Ed Skrein, Sylvia Hoeks, Jamie Parker, Calam Lynch and Savannah Steyn. Filming began in February 2025. Production took place in Prague, Czech Republic, and Ischgl, Austria, and wrapped in June 2025.

The series was produced by Skydance Television, Amazon MGM Studios, Spring Tide, Double Dream, and Orit Entertainment. By August 2025, Paramount Television Studios had taken over production of the series following the merger of Skydance Television's parent company Skydance Media with Paramount Global into Paramount Skydance.

In September 2026, the series was canceled after one season.

== Release ==
The series premiered with all eight episodes on July 15, 2026.

== Reception ==
On the review aggregator website Rotten Tomatoes, the series holds an approval rating of 96%, based on 26 reviews, with an average of rated reviews of 7.2/10. The website's critics consensus reads, "Reveling in the dynamic friendship between Octavia Spencer and Hannah Waddingham, this Ride or Die spy caper maximizes its entertainment, humor, and fun through genuine performances and breezy writing." Metacritic, which uses a weighted average, assigned a score of 73 out of 100 based on 15 critics, indicating "generally favorable" reviews.
