= Modern Family season 10 =

Season of television series

Modern Family
- Season 10
- DVD cover
- Starring: Ed O'Neill; Sofía Vergara; Julie Bowen; Ty Burrell; Jesse Tyler Ferguson; Eric Stonestreet; Sarah Hyland; Ariel Winter; Nolan Gould; Rico Rodriguez; Aubrey Anderson-Emmons; Jeremy Maguire
- No. of episodes: 22

Release
- Original network: ABC
- Original release: September 26, 2018 – May 8, 2019

Season chronology
- ← Previous; Season 9 Next → Season 11

The tenth season of the American television sitcom Modern Family aired on ABC from September 26, 2018 to May 8, 2019.

The season was produced by 20th Century Fox Television, Steven Levitan Productions, and Picador Productions, with creators Steven Levitan and Christopher Lloyd as showrunners. This season was ordered, along with the ninth season, on May 10, 2017.

== Cast ==
=== Main ===
- Ed O'Neill as Jay Pritchett
- Sofía Vergara as Gloria Pritchett
- Julie Bowen as Claire Dunphy
- Ty Burrell as Phil Dunphy
- Jesse Tyler Ferguson as Mitchell Pritchett
- Eric Stonestreet as Cameron Tucker
- Sarah Hyland as Haley Dunphy
- Ariel Winter as Alex Dunphy
- Nolan Gould as Luke Dunphy
- Rico Rodriguez as Manny Delgado
- Aubrey Anderson-Emmons as Lily Tucker-Pritchett
- Jeremy Maguire as Joe Pritchett

=== Recurring ===
- Chris Geere as Arvin Fennerman
- Reid Ewing as Dylan Marshall
- Marcello Reyes as Calhoun Johnson

=== Guest ===
- Dan Levy as Jonah
- Ben Schwartz as Nick
- Hillary Anne Matthews as Sherry Shaker
- Jimmy Tatro as Bill
- Shelley Long as Dede Pritchett (voiceover only)
- Fred Willard as Frank Dunphy
- Mira Sorvino as Nicole Rosemary Page
- Andrew Daly as Principal Brown
- Rob Riggle as Gil Thorpe
- Ed Begley, Jr. as Jerry Lamcus
- Amanda Payton as Laura
- Steve Monroe as Santa
- Gerald Downey as Jim
- Dana Powell as Pam Tucker
- Rachel Bay Jones as Farrah Marshall
- Sedona Fuller as Betty
- London Fuller as Janice
- Avery Tiu Essex as Young Claire
- Philip Anthony Rodriguez as Tim
- Tessa Auberjonois as Nancy
- Nathan Lane as Pepper Saltzman
- Christian Barillas as Ronaldo
- Patty Guggenheim as Danielle
- Lindsay Mendez as Bel Air Black Widow
- Kylen Deporter as Alexei
- Desi Dennis Dylan as Foreperson
- Kamryn Kunody as Christina
- Eric Tiede as Desmond
- Scott Deckart as Evan
- Abby Roberge as Ben
- Christine Garver as Anna
- Josh Brener as Carl
- Bill Parks as Park Ranger
- Charles Janasz as Sir Kenneth
- Greta Jung as Mia
- Shanon-Ann Minkley as Mindy
- Frankie A. Rodriguez as Eduardo
- Joshua Hoover as Wayne
- Anne Stedman as Allison #1
- Antonia Jones as Allison #2
- Elizabeth Sandy as Janine
- Jack DePew as Chip
- Briga Heelan as Linda
- Dominic Burgess as Nate
- Greg Pitts as Rusty
- Kimberly Jürgen as Donna
- Patrick Cavanaugh as Mcdonals
- Mel Powell as Cam and Minnie’s friend
- Morry Schorr as Club Member
- Lucas Steagall as Blinker
- James VI as Waiter
- Charles Shaughnessy as Dr. Slieglitz
- Jackie Joseph as Marion
- Amy Pietz as Janice
- Casey Burke as Tina
- Ramiz Monsef as Doctor
- Greg Rikkart as Dr. William Shakes
- Eden Rose as Annabelle
- Jack Axelrod as Bert
- Thomas Lennon as Orson Funt
- Virginia Williams as Ashley Walls-Carnegie
- Landon Klotz as Pitkowski
- Jay Pichardo as Groundskeeper
- Jay Mandyam as Chug
- Tom Everett as Dean
- Kendall Foote as Auctioneer
- Tyler Cook as Ashley's Husband
- Matthew Wrather as Sensei Ron
- Mina Joo as Store Worker
- Joshua Tyler Kelly as Gerald
- Matt Roth as Skip Woosnum
- Chazz Palmenteri as Shorty
- Matthew Risch as Jotham
- Malakai Carey as Robert
- Ghadir Mounib as Server
- Jeffrey Richman as Vincent
- Kit McDonough as Piano teacher
- Demi Harman as Tattoo girl

== Episodes ==
Modern Family season 10 episodes
No. overall	No. in season	Title	Directed by	Written by	Original release date	Prod. code	U.S. viewers (millions)
211	1	"I Love a Parade"	James Bagdonas	Paul Corrigan & Brad Walsh	September 26, 2018	AARG01	5.40
The family gets together for the annual Fourth of July parade where Jay acts as the grand marshal. Haley's farewell to Arvin doesn't go as well as expected and she is distracted by the return of Dylan. Phil and Luke want to compete in a hot dog contest which they do and win, while Claire is trained by Alex in cocooning. Also, Mitch and Cam want to show that they can raise Cal by trying to make a video to send to Pam who is in prison, showing Cal doing something new like catching a ball or knowing addition.
212	2	"Kiss and Tell"	Steven Levitan	Abraham Higginbotham & Jon Pollack	October 3, 2018	AARG02	5.39
The family gets together at Jay's house but nobody knows what the occasion is. Phil plans to flip the script on Jay Mean Girls-style after watching the movie with Alex, but Jay learns about his trick and does the same to him. In the end, Phil gets to Jay by acting like a man and starts to grill. Manny returns from his road trip and tells them he has a Canadian girlfriend, but nobody really believes him because he doesn't have any photos of her. After talking to Mitch and Cam, Gloria thinks Manny is gay and tries to make him come out. However, it turns out Manny is really straight and his girlfriend is real. Haley feels conflicted about kissing Dylan, and looks for advice, but her uncles (and later, her parents) give her conflicting opinions. Dylan confesses he has always loved Haley, and Haley realizes she still loves him as well.
213	3	"A Sketchy Area"	Jeffrey Walker	Elaine Ko	October 10, 2018	AARG03	5.10
Phil is given the opportunity to teach in Luke's college, but Luke is against it. Phil tries an emotional approach to convince Luke but the latter sticks to his mind. In the end, after Luke makes the rugby team, he has a change of heart and agrees to let his dad teach in the same college. Also, Claire and Jay clash with one another regarding their partnership with EZRA Visions. Also, Cam wants justice and helps Mitch against a sketch court artist, while Gloria and Alex have a discussion about Joe's first day at school.
214	4	"Torn Between Two Lovers"	Beth McCarthy-Miller	Jeffrey Richman & Danny Zuker	October 17, 2018	AARG04	5.03
Haley can't seem to choose between her past and present relationships. Manny returns to college and dorm life while his girlfriend, Sherry, continues to stay at Jay and Gloria's, and might be overstaying her welcome. Jay is bothered by that and go tell Gloria but the latter is pretending to be okay with it so as not to be the bad guy. Mitch and Cam are invited to dinner by one of Mitch's co-workers, Trent, who's leading a very high profile case Mitch wants in. It seems a good match, since Trent is also gay, married and with two children, but things don't go as Mitch expects. Trent's two children turns out to be dogs. While the adults are in the kitchen, Lily and Cal break some stuff in the living room, some of which were rare exotic things. Eventually Mitch does not get the job. Ultimately, Haley chooses Dylan over Arvin.
215	5	"Good Grief"	Beth McCarthy-Miller	Vali Chandrasekaran & Stephen Lloyd	October 24, 2018	AARG06	5.27
During Halloween, Jay, Mitchell, and Claire each receive a call, being informed that Jay's ex-wife & Mitchell & Claire's mother, DeDe, has died in her sleep while on a trip with her women's group; the family must deal with the news of her death.
216	6	"On the Same Paige"	Ryan Case	Ryan Walls	October 31, 2018	AARG05	5.01
Phil learns that his real estate class will be cancelled if one student, Paige, drops his class, he convinces her to stay but fears he may have misled her. Meanwhile, Jay may unknowingly be flirting with the mother of Joe's classmate and tries to set boundaries. Mitchell agrees to be more involved in Cameron’s activities.
217	7	"Did the Chicken Cross the Road?"	Eric Dean Seaton	Bill Wrubel	November 7, 2018	AARG07	5.44
Cameron blames Mitchell after he forgets the words to his favorite country song, and decides he needs to reconnect with his roots and gets a chicken. Meanwhile, when Alex is up for a government job that requires a family interview, it causes everyone to overcompensate and jeopardize her chances. Haley finds out she’s pregnant after an accident while on a date with Dylan. Luke helps his family with psychology classes and Jay and Gloria disagree over Joe's education.
218	8	"Kids These Days"	James Bagdonas	Jon Pollack & Danny Zuker	November 28, 2018	AARG08	4.85
Haley tries to handle her pregnancy but after receiving a promotion, she fears she may have to quit her dream job. Meanwhile, Alex goes sexy clothes shopping with Gloria instead of Claire. Cameron is accused of being insensitive from his football team. Mitch and Phil stop for food at a gay bar on their way to a Star Wars convention and discover Gil Thorpe's hidden secret.
219	9	"Putting Down Roots"	Kat Coiro	Jack Burditt	December 5, 2018	AARG10	4.87
Dede's husband, Jerry, comes to town to bequeath her possessions to the family. Mitch receives a plant scattered with her ashes and Claire receives her old car. Jerry teaches Jay it's better to always agree with Gloria even if she’s wrong. Phil and Claire go for a drive but Phil learns a bit too much about Claire’s past sexual life. Haley fears for her pregnancy after she finds an old doll of hers and can’t take care of it; she tells Alex and Luke she is pregnant.
220	10	"Stuck in a Moment"	Fred Savage	Elaine Ko	December 12, 2018	AARG09	5.69
Gloria receives a gift from Colombia that causes a spider infestation and forces them to celebrate Christmas at Claire's. Phil borrows the Christmas tree for a house opening, which irritates Claire, who sees it and steals it back without him knowing. Mitch and Cam try to figure out what Cal wants for Christmas from the mall Santa, whom Mitch put on trial. Haley and Dylan try to tell Claire they’re having a baby but can’t find the right moment. Alex’s hair turns grey from the stress of hiding their secret. Eventually, they tell the whole family who are excited, except for Phil and Claire who are worried.
221	11	"A Moving Day"	Iwona Sapienza	Paul Corrigan & Brad Walsh	January 9, 2019	AARG12	4.82
Claire and Phil aren't convinced that Haley and Dylan can make it on their own as they move them into their new apartment before the baby arrives. Haley learns that she is actually having twins. Pameron gets out of prison early and has a bone to pick with Mitchell and Gloria makes Jay intervene when Manny’s girlfriend keeps telling him what to do.
222	12	"Blasts from the Past"	Fred Savage	Vali Chandrasekaran & Stephen Lloyd	January 16, 2019	AARG11	4.62
Phil and Claire meet Dylan's mother, but are not enthusiastic about her ideas for Dylan and Haley impending parenthood. Meanwhile, Jay and Gloria discover that their uncles both fought in a war, albeit on opposite sites. Mitch finds an issue of Playgirl magazine is in Lily's room, but learns it did not find its way there in the manner he thought.
223	13	"Whanex?"	Elaine Ko	Bill Wrubel	January 23, 2019	AARG13	4.50
Technology issues and a lack of camaraderie among the staff leaves Jay "homesick." Meanwhile, Cam invites Alex, Manny, Haley, and Luke to the high school to help with his presentation to the student body on plans after high school, but Mitchell's conflicting input leaves Cam uneasy. Elsewhere, Gloria, Phil, and Joe audition for a photo shoot to be the ideal family unit in an advertisement for the mall.
224	14	"We Need to Talk About Lily"	Abraham Higginbotham	Abraham Higginbotham & Jeffrey Richman	January 30, 2019	AARG14	4.92
Fearing that Lily is being too reserved, Cam and Mitch score an invitation to a party being thrown by Lily's favorite vlogger. However, Lily is less than impressed upon meeting the Internet sensation. Meanwhile, Phil tries to convince Pepper to sign a sales agreement for a new house. Jay and Gloria take Stella to the vet for minor surgery, and Jay is overcome with emotion thinking about the possibility of losing his prized pet. Elsewhere, Alex's boyfriend, Bill, asks to meet with Phil and Claire to discuss his invention, but, convinced that he is going to propose, Alex and Claire try to prevent Bill from popping the question.
225	15	"SuperShowerBabyBowl"	Helena Lamb-Weber	Jack Burditt & Jon Pollack	February 20, 2019	AARG15	4.43
Misunderstandings is the theme of the day as Jay's Super Bowl party overlaps with Haley's baby shower at the Pritchett household. The family is tasked with finding Dylan after he leaves the house, fearing that he'll never be accepted by the clan. Meanwhile, both Cam and Jay think the other forgot about their plans to make chili, Mitch frets that an inmate has been released early and wants revenge, Lily finds herself in a feud with a friend, and Manny and Phil argue over Phil's performance in Manny's latest film.
226	16	"Red Alert"	Julie Bowen	Teleplay by : Jessica Poter & Ryan Walls; Story by : Ryan Walls	February 27, 2019	AARG16	4.33
Haley's incapacity to take prenatal classes lesson seriously worries Phil, who develops insomnia during a promo for a house with Luke. Jay gets mad at Claire when she plans to become a company's CEO but ultimately decides to retire in order to let her own the company. Mitch and Cam rally the women (except for Claire) and Manny to reassure Lily, who reaches an important step of her life.
227	17	"The Wild"	James Bagdonas	Elaine Ko	March 13, 2019	AARG17	4.65
Phil, Mitch, and Cam join Jay on his annual wilderness hike in search of a bald eagle, and along the way confront their fears. Gloria, Claire, Alex, and Haley work together to prepare the nursery for Haley's twins.
228	18	"Stand by Your Man"	Jim Hensz	Teleplay by : Jack Burditt & Bill Wrubel; Story by : Jeffrey Richman	March 20, 2019	AARG20	4.25
Phil invites Luke, Dylan and Bill to watch a pay-per-view fight in an attempt to impress and bond with them. Claire and Lily connect over being uncool. Mitchell joins Cam for line dancing night after forgetting their anniversary. Jay gets a slot on a TV shopping channel to promote his dog bed business, to Gloria's chagrin.
229	19	"Yes-Woman"	Fred Savage	Paul Corrigan & Brad Walsh	April 3, 2019	AARG19	4.33
Claire decides to be more positive and accidentally says yes to the new romance between Luke and her yoga teacher, Janice. Also, Jay and Manny worry about what people think about them, while Phil decides to surprise Alex, who is graduating. Mitch and Cam have difficulties finding some hobbies for people of their age.
230	20	"Can't Elope"	Jeffrey Walker	Danny Zuker	April 10, 2019	AARG18	4.81
Haley and Dylan want to elope before their twins' birth. Also, Jay continues his new project with Instagram. Mitch and Cam have to choose between a musical version of Sophie's Choice or Haley's wedding. Haley and Dylan finally marry in private, with their mothers, Phil, Frank, Alex and Luke in attendance.
231	21	"Commencement"	Eric Dean Seaton	Vali Chandrasekaran & Stephen Lloyd	May 1, 2019	AARG21	4.24
Cam finally gets the chance to preside at a graduate ceremony. Jay has to make a speech at the graduation but a series of mishaps occur when he is discovered to be the owl killer. Also, Luke and Haley feel inferior when Phil and Claire keep praising Alex for her status, only to find out that Alex is stressed about the real world. Claire meets an old rival and Manny believes that Gloria bribes everyone to make her family happy.
232	22	"A Year of Birthdays"	Steven Levitan	Steven Levitan	May 8, 2019	AARG22	4.41
The family relives the birthdays they have had in the past year, as the birth of Haley and Dylan’s twins nears. While Phil resolves to learn how to play the piano, Claire discovers that everybody thinks she is tightly wound. Cam and Lily have their birthdays spoiled by a heartbroken Manny, who proposes to Sherry on his birthday and gets rejected. In the present, Haley gives birth to a boy and a girl and the entire family gathers together.

== Ratings ==
Viewership and ratings per episode of Modern Family season 10
No.	Title	Air date	Rating/share (18–49)	Viewers (millions)	DVR (18–49)	DVR viewers (millions)	Total (18–49)	Total viewers (millions)
1	"I Love a Parade"	September 26, 2018	1.6/7	5.40	1.2	3.20	2.8	8.60
2	"Kiss and Tell"	October 3, 2018	1.4/6	5.39	1.2	2.90	2.6	8.29
3	"A Sketchy Area"	October 10, 2018	1.4/6	5.10	1.0	2.63	2.4	7.74
4	"Torn Between Two Lovers"	October 17, 2018	1.3/6	5.03	0.9	2.50	2.2	7.53
5	"Good Grief"	October 24, 2018	1.5/6	5.27	1.1	3.04	2.6	8.31
6	"On the Same Paige"	October 31, 2018	1.2/5	5.01	1.1	2.85	2.3	7.86
7	"Did the Chicken Cross the Road?"	November 7, 2018	1.4/6	5.44	1.1	2.98	2.5	8.42
8	"Kids These Days"	November 28, 2018	1.3/6	4.85	1.2	3.14	2.5	7.99
9	"Putting Down Roots"	December 5, 2018	1.3/6	4.87	1.1	3.11	2.4	7.98
10	"Stuck in a Moment"	December 12, 2018	1.4/6	5.69	1.1	3.09	2.5	8.78
11	"A Moving Day"	January 9, 2019	1.3/6	4.82	1.3	3.35	2.6	8.17
12	"Blasts from the Past"	January 16, 2019	1.2/6	4.62	1.2	3.21	2.4	7.83
13	"Whanex?"	January 23, 2019	1.2/6	4.50	1.3	3.19	2.5	7.68
14	"We Need to Talk About Lily"	January 30, 2019	1.2/5	4.92	1.1	3.01	2.3	7.93
15	"SuperShowerBabyBowl"	February 20, 2019	1.1/5	4.43	1.1	3.15	2.2	7.58
16	"Red Alert"	February 27, 2019	1.1/5	4.33	1.2	3.19	2.3	7.52
17	"The Wild"	March 13, 2019	1.2/6	4.65	1.0	2.89	2.2	7.54
18	"Stand By Your Man"	March 20, 2019	1.1/5	4.25	1.0	2.89	2.1	7.14
19	"Yes-Woman"	April 3, 2019	1.1/5	4.33	1.1	2.88	2.2	7.21
20	"Can't Elope"	April 10, 2019	1.2/5	4.81	1.0	2.90	2.2	7.71
21	"Commencement"	May 1, 2019	1.0/5	4.24	1.0	2.89	2.0	7.14
22	"A Year of Birthdays"	May 8, 2019	1.0/5	4.41	1.1	2.81	2.1	7.15

== DVD release ==
Modern Family: The Complete Tenth Season
Set Details		Special Feature
22 episodes; 3-disc set; 1.78:1 aspect ratio; English (Dolby Digital 5.1); Subtitles: English, Spanish and French; Runtime: 472 minutes		Gag Reel
Release Dates
Region 1	Region 2	Region 4
September 17, 2019	September 9, 2019	September 9, 2019
