= Matthew Miller (producer) =

American television writer and producer

Matt Miller
- Born: Matthew Miller; United States
- Occupations: Television writer; television producer; showrunner
- Years active: 1996–present

Matthew Miller is an American television writer, producer, and showrunner. He is best known for creating, writing, and executive producing the ABC fantasy crime drama series Forever (2014–2015) and developing, writing, and executive producing the Fox action-comedy series Lethal Weapon (2016–2019). For the Warner Bros. Television series The Flight Attendant (2020), he shared a Primetime Emmy Award nomination for Outstanding Comedy Series as a producer.

Prior to his work on Forever and Lethal Weapon, Miller was primarily known for his work on comedy and spy series such as Grown Ups (1999), Las Vegas (2003), and Chuck (2007). Later, he also served as an executive producer for the DC superhero series Peacemaker (2022) and the action-comedy series Ride or Die (2026).

== Early life ==
Miller developed an interest in television and filmmaking at an early age, eventually pursuing a career in the entertainment industry in Southern California.

In 1996, Miller made his professional directorial debut with the short film Understanding Olivia, which marked his entry into the Hollywood film and television landscape. He later transitioned into television screenwriting and production, signing a series of prominent overall deals with major studios like Warner Bros. Television and developing prime-time series for national broadcast networks.

== Career ==
Miller began his entertainment career on American television in the late 1990s, making his screenwriting debut with the 1999 sitcom Grown Ups, which he created for the UPN network. He has since written and executive produced prime-time network series such as Las Vegas, Human Target, and 666 Park Avenue. Outside of his extensive television production and writing work, Miller has directed two projects: the 1996 independent short film Understanding Olivia and the 2002 romantic comedy feature film The Perfect You, which he also wrote.

== Filmography ==
=== Film ===
Year	Title	Director	Writer	Producer
1996	Understanding Olivia	Yes	No	No
2002	The Perfect You	Yes	Yes	No
2005	Dynasty: The Making of a Guilty Pleasure	Yes	Yes	No

=== Television ===
Year	Title	Director	Writer	Producer	Notes
1999–2000	Grown Ups	No	Yes	Executive	Also creator
2003–2008	Las Vegas	No	Yes (12 eps.)	Co-executive	
2007–2011	Chuck	No	Yes (14 eps.)	Co-executive (66 eps.)	
2010–2011	Human Target	No	Yes (2 eps.)	Executive (13 eps.)	
2012–2013	666 Park Avenue	No	Yes (1 ep.)	Executive (13 eps.)	Showrunner
2014–2015	Forever	No	Yes (3 eps.)	Executive (22 eps.)	Also creator and showrunner
2016–2019	Lethal Weapon	No	Yes (6 eps.)	Executive (55 eps.)	Also developer and showrunner
2017–2018	Trial & Error	No	Yes (2 eps.)	Executive (23 eps.)	Also creator and showrunner
2020	The Flight Attendant	No	No	Consulting (7 eps.)	
2022	Peacemaker	No	No	Executive (8 eps.)	
2026	Ride or Die	No	Yes (3 eps.)	Executive (8 eps.)	Also co-showrunner
