= Katherine Ryan: Glitter Room =

- Directed by: Linda Mendoza
- Starring: Katherine Ryan
- Production company: Irwin Entertainment
- Distributed by: Netflix
- Release date: July 1, 2019
- Running time: 65 minutes
- Country: United States
- Language: English

Katherine Ryan: Glitter Room is a stand-up comedy special by Canadian comic Katherine Ryan, her second for Netflix following Katherine Ryan: In Trouble. Glitter Room was filmed in Los Angeles. It was released on July 1, 2019.
