= Seraphina Beh =

English actress (born 1994)

- Born: 1994 (age 31–32); Croydon, London, England
- Other name: Seraphina Beh-Moore
- Occupation: Actress
- Years active: 2014–present
- Spouse: Matthew Moore (m. 2025)

Seraphina Beh-Moore (born 1994) is a British actress. After beginning her career in various stage productions, she initially gained attention for her role as school bully Madison Drake in the BBC soap opera EastEnders (2017). She has since appeared in various British television series including Top Boy (2019, 2022), Quiz (2020), Crongton (2024) and Malpractice (2025), as well as continuing to appear in stage productions.

== Early life ==
Beh was born in 1994 in Croydon, London, to a family of Liberian descent. She attended St Mary's Catholic High School in the area; whilst there, she made news headlines for successfully campaigning to get a 140-year ban on girls wearing trousers lifted. When it was lifted, she said: "I am proud that we have won this battle for generations of schoolgirls in the future." She competed on a basketball team whilst at school, but has stated that she was the worst one on her team.

Whilst attending St Mary's, Beh went on a school trip to the Young Vic to watch The Brothers Size. She felt inspired as a Black woman, stating: "it was the first time I thought I could see myself as a woman of colour doing [acting]". Prior to this, she noticed a pattern of Black people predominantly portraying gang members and criminals, which she could not relate to at all.

== Career ==
After she had completed her A levels, Beh began attending various open auditions, and in 2012, she made her stage debut in a production of Skeen at the Ovalhouse. She continued making various stage appearances and eventually booked her first television role in an episode of the BBC medical drama series Casualty in 2014. Beh then went to train with the National Youth Theatre Company (NYTC). Whilst there, she auditioned for the role of Madison Drake on the BBC soap opera EastEnders. Her final recall for the role landed on the same day as her final performance of Pigeon English, a production with the NYTC. She assumed she would be unable to attend, but the producers of EastEnders instead came to the production to see her; she subsequently landed the role of Madison and left the NYTC early to pursue the job. Beh's character was brought in alongside Alexandra D'Costa (Sydney Craven) and the pair acted as bullies towards characters Louise Mitchell (Tilly Keeper) and Bex Fowler (Jasmine Armfield). The characters were written out after they are charged with GBH for pushing Louise onto an array of lit candles. For her portrayal of Madison, Beh won the International Achievement Recognition Award for Best Emerging Actress.

After her EastEnders role in 2017, Beh starred in a production of Parliament Square at the Royal Exchange and the Bush Theatre. 2018 saw Beh appear in Leave Taking, also at the Bush Theatre, where her performances was praised by The Guardian, as well as a production of The Wolves at Theatre Royal Stratford East. She then appeared in an episode of the BBC medical drama series Holby City in 2019. That same year, she joined the cast of the Netflix series Top Boy for its third series. She portrayed Farah, a character she returned as for its fourth series in 2022. In 2020, she appeared in two episodes of the crime drama series Silent Witness, as well as a main role in the ITV1 miniseries Quiz. She also appeared in the third series of Bard from the Barn. In 2023, Beh made her film debut in Polite Society. 2025 then saw her star in the BBC Three comedy series Crongton, as well as appearing in the second series of the ITV1 medical drama series Malpractice.

== Filmography ==
Year	Title	Role	Notes
2014	Casualty	Emma Selby	Episode: "Fallen Stars"
2015	The Tide	Street Kid 4	Short film
2015	A World for Her		Short film
2017	EastEnders	Madison Drake	Regular role
2019	Holby City	Maz Emmanuel	Episode: "Pleased to Meet You"
2019, 2022	Top Boy	Farah	Recurring role
2020	Silent Witness	Jade Brandyce	Recurring role
2020	Quiz	Ruth Settle	Main role
2020	Bard from the Barn	Hotspur	Episode: "Hotspur"
2020	Two Single Beds	June	Short film
2021	Tuesday	Sara	Short film
2023	Polite Society	Clara	Film
2023	Maneater	Beth	Television film
2023	The Wheel of Time	Arrata	Episode: "What Might Be"
2025	Crongton	Elaine	Main role
2025	Malpractice	Toni Campbell-Brown	Recurring role
2026	The Other Bennet Sister	Miss Clarke	Guest role

== Stage ==
Year	Title	Role	Venue
2012	Skeen	Anita Elric	Ovalhouse
2012	Romeo and Juliet	Juliet Capulet	Ovalhouse
2013	OnDisTing	Michelle	Ovalhouse
2013	Jack and the Beanstalk	Ensemble	Lyric Theatre
2015	My Beautiful City	Chaos	Arcola Theatre
2015	Black Attack	Space	Bush Theatre
2016	Cosmic Jives	Rory / Aurora	Albany Theatre
2016	DNA	Mandy	National Youth Theatre
2016	Romeo and Juliet	Tybalt	National Youth Theatre
2016	Pigeon English	Harri	National Youth Theatre
2017	Daddy Issues of a Harlesden Girl	Eve	Lyric Theatre
2017	Parliament Square	Catherine	Royal Exchange / Bush Theatre
2018	Leave Taking	Del	Bush Theatre
2018	The Wolves	00	Theatre Royal Stratford East
2018	Tired	Ayo	Young Vic
2019	Catalyst	Ensemble	North Wall Arts Centre
2019	The Ridiculous Darkness	Various	Gate Theatre
2022–2023	Wasted	Temi	Various

== Awards and nominations ==
Year	Award	Category	Nominated work	Result	Ref.
2017	International Achievement Recognition Awards	Best Emerging Actress	EastEnders	Won	
