= Rosie Molloy Gives Up Everything =

2022 comedy drama television series

- Genre: Comedy drama
- Created by: Susan Nickson
- Written by: Susan Nickson
- Directed by: David Sant
- Starring: Sheridan Smith
- No. of series: 1
- No. of episodes: 6

Production
- Executive producers: Elaine Cameron; Susan Nickson; Jon Mountague
- Producer: Sarah Fraser
- Production companies: Hartswood Films; Sky Studios

Original release
- Network: Sky Comedy
- Release: 7 December – 28 December 2022

Rosie Molloy Gives Up Everything is a British comedy drama television series, created and written by Susan Nickson. It stars Sheridan Smith in the title role and premiered on 7 December 2022 on Sky Comedy.

== Cast and characters ==
- Sheridan Smith as Rosie Molloy
- Ardal O'Hanlon as Conall Molloy
- Pauline McLynn as Win Molloy
- Lewis Reeves as Joey Molloy
- Oliver Wellington as Nico
- Adelle Leonce as Ruby
- Leah MacRae as Monica

== Episodes ==
No.	Title	Directed by	Written by	Original release date
1	"Episode 1"	David Sant	Susan Nickson	7 December 2022
2	"Episode 2"	David Sant	Susan Nickson	14 December 2022
3	"Episode 3"	David Sant	Susan Nickson	21 December 2022
4	"Episode 4"	David Sant	Susan Nickson	21 December 2022
5	"Episode 5"	David Sant	Susan Nickson	28 December 2022
6	"Episode 6"	David Sant	Susan Nickson	28 December 2022

== Broadcast ==
The series premiered on 7 December 2022 on Sky Comedy.

== Reception ==
Stuart Jeffries of The Guardian said, "It’s gags galore in Sheridan Smith’s hilarious new comedy. The actor’s captivating turn as an out-of-control hedonist has a script stuffed with jokes." Carol Midgley of The Times agreed, writing, "Some vehicles work better for Sheridan Smith than others, but Rosie Molloy Gives Up Everything is a rocket for her talent," concluding, "Its irreverence probably won’t please some. Rosie Molloy is a mess, but a damn funny one." Sean O'Grady of The Independent praised the series' "great deal of dramatic tension", noting, "It’s comical, in the darkest kind of way. In Smith’s spirited (no pun intended) performance, our Rosie is a kind of engaging Mancunian good-time girl who’ll try anything once – and then get addicted to it."
