= Romantic Getaway =

2023 British television series

- Genre: Comedy
- Written by: Romesh Ranganathan; Benjamin Green
- Directed by: Shaun Wilson
- Starring: Katherine Ryan; Romesh Ranganathan; Johnny Vegas; Harrie Hayes; Phaldut Sharma; Julie Legrand
- Original language: English
- No. of series: 1
- No. of episodes: 6

Production
- Executive producers: Jon Montague; Romesh Ranganathan; Ben Green; Anil Gupta; Michelle Farr-Scott
- Producer: Caroline Norris
- Running time: 28 minutes
- Production companies: Ranga Bee; Sky Studios

Original release
- Network: Sky Comedy
- Release: 1 January – 15 January 2023

Romantic Getaway is a British comedy television series created by Romesh Ranganathan and Benjamin Green, while Ranganathan stars alongside Katherine Ryan. The series premiered on 1 January 2023 on Sky Comedy.

== Premise ==
A couple who are struggling to conceive decide to fund more IVF treatment through illegal means. However, things escalate out of their control when they steal half a million pounds.

== Cast and characters ==
- Katherine Ryan as Alison
- Romesh Ranganathan as Deacon
- Johnny Vegas as Alfie
- Harrie Hayes as Esme
- Phaldut Sharma as Kethan
- Julie Legrand as Sally

== Episodes ==
No.	Title	Directed by	Written by	Original release date
1	"Episode One"	Shaun Wilson	Romesh Ranganathan; Benjamin Green	1 January 2023
2	"Episode Two"	Shaun Wilson	Benjamin Green	1 January 2023
3	"Episode Three"	Shaun Wilson	Elaine Grace	8 January 2023
4	"Episode Four"	Shaun Wilson	Sarah Morgan	8 January 2023
5	"Episode Five"	Shaun Wilson	Romesh Ranganathan	15 January 2023
6	"Episode Six"	Shaun Wilson	Romesh Ranganathan; Sarah Morgan; Benjamin Green	15 January 2023

== Production ==
The project was co-written and co-produced by Ranganathan through his own production company Ranga Bee. The project was announced in March 2022 with Shaun Wilson directing and Caroline Norris producing with Jon Montague executive producing for Sky Studios. Filming took place in the summer of 2022 in Jersey, and St Albans.

== Broadcast ==
The series premiered on 1 January 2023 on Sky Comedy and Now in the United Kingdom. Internationally, it aired in the MENA on the OSN tv Comedy channel.

== Reception ==
Rebecca Nicholson in The Guardian awarded the series three stars, describing it as part-rom com and part-thriller, and saying that although the "use of IVF as the jumping-off point for a comedy caper is debatable…it works well, even in its occasional emotional moments, thanks to the calibre of its cast. It leans heavily on the appeal of its two funny leads, Ryan and Ranganathan".

Gerard Gilbert for the i (newspaper) also awarded the show three stars, saying that "bone-dry chemistry" between Ryan and Ranganathan was "the best thing about Romantic Getaway". He also praised elements of the plotting which managed to "throw up unexpected twists", concluding that it is "not an instant classic, but you could do worse".
