= Code 404 =

British television series (2020–)

- Genre: Police procedural; Comedy drama; Detective fiction
- Created by: Tom Miller; Sam Myer; Daniel Peak
- Written by: Daniel Peak
- Directed by: Al Campbell
- Starring: Stephen Graham; Daniel Mays
- Music by: Oli Julian
- Country of origin: United Kingdom
- Original language: English
- No. of series: 3
- No. of episodes: 18

Production
- Producer: Charlotte Surtees
- Cinematography: John Sorapure
- Running time: 25 minutes
- Production companies: Kudos; Water & Power Productions

Original release
- Network: Sky One (series 1); Sky Comedy (series 2–3)
- Release: 29 April 2020 – 4 August 2022

Code 404 is a British police procedural comedy drama television series created by Tom Miller, Sam Myer, and Daniel Peak, and produced by Kudos and Water & Power Productions. The series stars Stephen Graham and Daniel Mays in the lead roles and the first series premiered on 29 April 2020 on Sky One. In May 2020, it was renewed for a second series which premiered on 1 September 2021 on Sky Comedy, following the shutdown of Sky One. In September 2021, it was renewed for a third series which premiered on 4 August 2022. In September 2023, it was cancelled after three series, due to Graham and Mays' busy schedules.

== Plot ==
Set in the near future, Code 404 revolves around a pair of top-notch investigators, DI John Major (Daniel Mays) and DI Roy Carver (Stephen Graham). When Major is killed on duty, his body is transferred to an experimental artificial intelligence project to revive him. However, the AI lacks the crime-fighting instincts of Major.

== Cast and characters ==
=== Main ===
- Stephen Graham as DI Roy Carver
- Daniel Mays as DI John Major

=== Supporting ===
- Rosie Cavaliero as DCS Dennett
- Anna Maxwell Martin as Dr. Kelly Major
- Amanda Payton as Dr. Alison Parfit
- Michelle Greenidge as PC/DS Judith Papastathopoulos
- Richard Gadd as Liam Cleasby
- Tracy-Ann Oberman as Helen Chalmers
- Steve Oram as DI Simon Gilbert (series 1–2)
- Emily Lloyd-Saini as DI Jeanette Ryle (series 1–2)
- Steve Meo as DI Paul Stokes (series 2)
- Michael Armstrong as PC Michael Michaels (series 2–3)
- Clive Russell as Clifford Major (series 2)
- Vinette Robinson as Prof. Sarah McAllister (series 3)

== Episodes ==
Series	Episodes	Originally released	Network
1	6	29 April 2020	Sky One
2	6	1 September 2021	Sky Comedy
3	6	4 August 2022	Sky Comedy

=== Series 1 (2020) ===
No.	Title	Directed by	Written by	Original release date
1	Episode 1	Al Campbell	Daniel Peak	29 April 2020
Detective John Major is killed after a failed sting operation, but the Met brings him back from the dead as part of an experimental artificial intelligence project, let by American scientist Alison Parfit. Major immediately goes on the hunt for his killer, dragging his still shocked partner and best friend Roy Carver along for the ride. Liam Cleasby, an apparently minor criminal at the sting, appears to be deeply connected to Major's murder.
2	Episode 2	Al Campbell	Daniel Peak	29 April 2020
Parfit reveals that if the A.I. Ethics Committee deem the project a failure, Major will be 'switched off' and he'll die for good. She gives Major a software update, but it’s setting of American phraseology is irritating to all. Kelly Major does not take her revived husband back, but does not reveal that she and Carver have been living together since Major died. DIs Gilbert and Lyle, working half-heartedly on the case of Major's murder, are revealed to be feeding information to Cleasby.
3	Episode 3	Al Campbell	Daniel Peak	29 April 2020
Former police commissioner Helen Chalmers heads the AI Ethics Committee reviewing Major's progress. Sweet on Major – they once slept together – she secretly feeds him information on his murder case. DS Dennett has given Major and Carver a new assignment, but Major would rather stake out Kelly's work. Kelly reveals she started seeing someone else after Major died, but does not tell him that it is Carver. Kristoff, the apparent lead criminal at the deadly sting, reveals to Major and Carver that he was no more than a patsy, and is worried that Cleasby is out to kill him; he is later found murdered.
4	Episode 4	Al Campbell	Daniel Peak	29 April 2020
The pressure is on with Major and Carver's latest assignment; protecting Chalmers, the head of the A.I. Ethics Committee. Success could secure Major's future, whereas failing to do so could seal his fate. Meanwhile, feeling stung by Kelly's rejection, Carver contemplates a transfer to Scotland. But when Kelly asks him to stay, he's filled with renewed hope.
5	Episode 5	Al Campbell	Daniel Peak	29 April 2020
To Carver's bewilderment, Major reveals that he is going to move back in with Kelly. Parfit discovers disturbing information in the AI Ethics files.
6	Episode 6	Al Campbell	Daniel Peak	29 April 2020
With Major's AI finally living up to the hype, Carver and Kelly come clean about their relationship. The team lies in wait to catch The Juggler.

=== Series 2 (2021) ===
No. overall	No. in season	Title	Directed by	Written by	Original release date
7	1	"Episode 1"	Al Campbell	Daniel Peak	1 September 2021
It has been three weeks since Carver and Major took down the Juggler, but personal problems still hinder the pair's professional success.
8	2	"Episode 2"	Al Campbell	Daniel Peak	1 September 2021
The re-emergence of a case from his past worries Major and it seems a simple firmware update will not help, while news from Kelly heightens his stress even more.
9	3	"Episode 3"	Al Campbell	Daniel Peak	1 September 2021
Major and Carver are assigned an investigation into reports of a dangerous new drug used in an underground MMA fight ring.
10	4	"Episode 4"	Al Campbell	Daniel Peak	1 September 2021
Major has a rival. Introducing BRIAN (Brain Representation In Artificial Networks): he's cute, fun, gives great pilates classes, sounds an awful lot like Richard Ayoade and is programmed to maximise arrests in the Greater London area.
11	5	"Episode 5"	Al Campbell	Daniel Peak	1 September 2021
Major's mood swings are getting out of hand. He and Carver are given the task of supplying Cleasby with a new identity under witness protection.
12	6	"Episode 6"	Al Campbell	Daniel Peak	1 September 2021
On the verge of full-blown systems failure, Major makes a desperate, last ditch effort to clear his dad's name. Carver believes he's got Clifford trapped, but the old cop isn't going down that easily.

=== Series 3 (2022) ===
No. overall	No. in season	Title	Directed by	Written by	Original release date
13	1	"Episode 1"	Al Campbell	Daniel Peak	4 August 2022
When a member of the SIU is brutally murdered, Carver and Major are assigned to investigate the case, and suspect they may be dealing with a serial killer.
14	2	"Episode 2"	Al Campbell	Daniel Peak	4 August 2022
Carver tries to use Cleasby as bait to lure out the Puppet Master.
15	3	"Episode 3"	Al Campbell	Daniel Peak	4 August 2022
Major discovers that he has been hacked.
16	4	"Episode 4"	Al Campbell	Daniel Peak	4 August 2022
Chalmers' trial collapses after Major's testimony is found to be fatally flawed.
17	5	"Episode 5"	Al Campbell	Daniel Peak	4 August 2022
The evidence against Major begins to tally up, but Carver isn't convinced that his closest colleague is a multiple murderer.
18	6	"Episode 6"	Al Campbell	Daniel Peak	4 August 2022
Kelly becomes the final target of the Puppet Master.

== Broadcast ==
The first series premiered on 29 April 2020 on Sky One in the United Kingdom. The second series premiered on 1 September 2021 on Sky Max. The third series premiered on 4 August 2022.

In the United States, the series premiered on 8 October 2020 on Peacock.
