= Alex Wheatle =

British writer (1963–2025)

Alex Wheatle MBE
- Born: Alex Alphonso Wheatle; 3 January 1963; London, England
- Died: 16 March 2025 (aged 62)
- Education: Shirley Oaks Children's Home
- Occupation: Novelist
- Children: 3
- Writing career
- Pen name: The Brixton Bard
- Language: English
- Notable works: Brixton Rock (1999); Crongton Knights (2016); Cane Warriors (2020)
- Notable awards: Guardian Children's Fiction Prize
- Literary movement: Black British literature
- Website: alexwheatle.com

Alex Alphonso Wheatle MBE (3 January 1963 – 16 March 2025) was a British novelist. He was brought up in a children's care home from the age of two, his education subsequently suffering from numerous suspensions and expulsions from school. His connection with the written word was bolstered during a prison sentence he was serving after the 1981 Brixton riot in London, when his older Rastafarian cellmate introduced him to the writings of many impactful writers, as well as engaging him in discussions about African history.

Wheatle went on to author many books, beginning with his 1999 debut novel Brixton Rock. In the 2008 Birthday Honours, Wheatle was appointed Member of the Order of the British Empire (MBE) for services to literature. Other recognition and awards he won included the Guardian Children's Fiction Prize. Wheatle's life story features in Steve McQueen's 2020 historical drama film Alex Wheatle, part of the television miniseries Small Axe, about the West Indian community in the UK during the 1970s and 1980s.

== Life and career ==
Born on 3 January 1963 in London, to Jamaican parents, Wheatle spent much of his childhood in the Shirley Oaks Children's Home in Croydon. As he much later recalled: "Although my education had stalled, with numerous suspensions and three expulsions, I had always had the ability to read well. When I was five, I started to read the comics and magazines that were sometimes discarded on my dormitory floor. Little did I know that it was boosting my aptitude for the written word."

When he was 15 years old, Wheatle was moved from Shirley Oaks to a social services hostel in Brixton, south London. At the age of 16, he was a founding member of the Crucial Rocker soundsystem; his DJ name was Yardman Irie. He wrote lyrics about everyday life in Brixton. When the 1981 Brixton riots were sparked by tensions between the police and the local black community, Wheatle became involved and was arrested, ultimately receiving a four-month sentence. Wheatle's cellmate, a Rastafari, encouraged him to start reading books – first suggesting The Black Jacobins by C. L. R. James – and to care about his education. Other authors whom Wheatle began to read included Chester Himes, Richard Wright, James Baldwin, Charles Dickens, Langston Hughes, Maya Angelou, Linton Kwesi Johnson, and John Steinbeck.

Wheatle spoke about the Brixton riots, most prominently in the 2006 BBC programme Battle for Brixton. His early books are based on his life in Brixton as a teenager and his time in social services' care. Wheatle featured aspects of his life in his books, such as East of Acre Lane characters Yardman Irie and Jah Nelson.

Wheatle received the London Arts Board New Writers Award in 1999 for his debut novel Brixton Rock.

He wrote and performed Uprising, a one-man play based on his own life at Tara Arts Studios, Wandsworth, London. In 2011, he took Uprising on tour and performed it at the Writing On The Wall Festival, Liverpool, the Oxford Playhouse, the Marlowe Theatre, Canterbury, the Ilkley Playhouse and the Albany Theatre, Deptford. The play re-toured theatres and literature festivals in 2012, marking the 50th year of Jamaican Independence.

Wheatle lived in London. He was a member of English PEN, and he visited various institutions facilitating creative writing classes and making speeches. He also narrated an audio guide to the streets of Brixton.

Wheatle died from prostate cancer on 16 March 2025, at the age of 62. Having been diagnosed with prostate cancer in 2023, he campaigned for Prostate Cancer UK.

== Legacy ==
=== Adaptations ===
Wheatle's debut novel Brixton Rock was adapted for the stage and performed at the Young Vic in July 2010.

A 10-part television adaptation of the Crongton books aired on BBC Three in March 2025.

=== In media ===
Wheatle's life story features in Alex Wheatle, the fourth film in Small Axe, a 2020 anthology of five films by Steve McQueen about the West Indian community in the UK during the 1970s and 1980s. Alex Wheatle depicts Wheatle's life up to and just after the Brixton uprising.

== Publications ==
- Brixton Rock (Black Amber, 1999)
- East of Acre Lane (Fourth Estate, 2001)
- The Seven Sisters (Fourth Estate, 2002)
- Checkers (with Mark Parham; X-Press, 2003)
- Island Songs (Allison & Busby, 2005)
- The Dirty South (Serpent's Tail, 2008)
- Brenton Brown (Arcadia, 2011)
- Liccle Bit (Atom, 2015)
- Crongton Knights (Atom, 2016)
- Straight Outta Crongton (Atom, 2017)
- Uprising (Spck, 2017)
- Nicolas Cage (Barrington Stoke, 2018)
- Home Boys (Arcadia, 2018)
- Home Girl (Little Brown, Akashic, Hachette UK, 2019)
- Cane Warriors (Andersen, 2020)
- Cringel (Pringles, 2020)
- Kemosha of the Caribbean (Andersen, 2022)
- Sufferah: Memoir of a Brixton Reggae Head (Arcadia, 2023)

== Awards and honours ==
In the 2008 Birthday Honours, Wheatle was appointed Member of the Order of the British Empire (MBE) for services to literature.

His young-adult novel Liccle Bit was longlisted for the Carnegie Medal in 2016.

His 2016 book Crongton Knights won the 50th Guardian Children's Fiction Prize. S. F. Said, one of the judging panel, said of the book: "Wheatle's writing is poetic, rhythmic and unique, remaking the English language with tremendous verve. Though Crongton is his invention, it resonates with many urban situations, not only in Britain but around the world. Crongton Knights is a major novel from a major voice in British children's literature."

In March 2024, the Arbeitskreis für Jugendliteratur, the German national section of IBBY, nominated Cane Warriors in the category Jugendbuch for the 2024 Deutscher Jugendliteraturpreis.
