= Sky Comedy =

British television channel launched in 2020 by Sky

- Logo used since 2026

- Alternate Logo for UI/EPG, digital and small format spaces.
- Country: United Kingdom
- Broadcast area: United Kingdom; Ireland

Programming
- Language: English
- Picture format: 1080i HDTV (downscaled to 16:9 576i for the SDTV feed.)

Ownership
- Owner: Sky Group (Comcast)
- Sister channels: List of Sky UK channels

History
- Launched: 27 January 2020; 6 years ago
- Replaced: Universal TV

Availability

Streaming media
- Sky Go: Watch live (UK and Ireland only)
- Now: Watch live (UK and Ireland only)
- Virgin TV Go: Watch live (UK only)
- Virgin TV Anywhere: Watch live (Ireland only)

Sky Comedy HD logo used from 2020 to 2026

Sky Comedy is a British pay television channel owned and operated by Sky, a division of Comcast. It launched on 27 January 2020, replacing Universal TV. It is the first dedicated full-time comedy station in Sky's channel portfolio since the closure of The Comedy Channel in 1992.

Sky Comedy predominantly broadcasts programming imported from the United States. It also broadcasts syndicated sitcoms, comedy films, stand-up specials, and talk shows. From 1 September 2021 onwards, Sky Comedy started airing the comedy output previously shown on Sky One (which was replaced by Sky Showcase and Sky Max).

Sky Comedy launched in Germany, Austria and Switzerland on 1 April 2021, and then closed on 27 September 2023.

== Current programming ==
=== Acquired programming ===
- The Chair Company
- I Love LA
- The Office Movers
- Real Time with Bill Maher (series 18–present) (Note: Moved from Sky Atlantic.)

== Former programming ==
=== Comedy ===
- Bloods (2021–22)
- Code 404 (series 2–3; 2021–22) (Note: Moved from Sky One)
- Hitmen (series 2; 2021)
- Breeders (series 3–4; 2022–23) (Note: Moved from Sky One. Co-production with FX)
- Upright (series 2; 2022) (Note: Moved from Sky Atlantic. Co-production with Fox Showcase)
- Avenue 5 (series 2; 2022) (Note: Moved from Sky One. Co-production with HBO)
- Rosie Molloy Gives Up Everything (2022)
- Romantic Getaway (2023)
- Intelligence (special; 2023)
- Smothered (2023)

=== Acquired programming ===
- American Auto
- And Just Like That...
- A.P. Bio
- Barry (series 3–4)
- Betty
- A Black Lady Sketch Show
- Black Monday (series 3)
- The Comeback (series 3)
- The Conners (series 1–5)
- Curb Your Enthusiasm (series 10–12)
- Fantasmas
- The Franchise
- Flatbush Misdemeanors (series 1) (Note: Moved to Paramount+ for series 2)
- Insecure (series 4–5)
- Jerrod Carmichael Reality Show
- Last Week Tonight with John Oliver (series 7–12) (Note: Moved from Sky Atlantic. Moved to Sky One for series 13.)
- The Late Late Show with James Corden (series 6–9)
- Los Espookys
- Miracle Workers
- Moonbase 8
- Mr. Mayor
- Our Cartoon President
- PEN15
- Random Acts of Flyness
- The Rehearsal
- The Righteous Gemstones
- Room 104 (series 2–4)
- Run
- Saturday Night Live (series 46–51) (Note: Moved to Sky One partway through series 51 onwards.)
- Somebody Somewhere
- Sort Of
- Sunnyside
- The Tonight Show Starring Jimmy Fallon (series 7–12)
- Warren's Vortex
- Wellington Paranormal
- Work in Progress
- Young Rock

== Second-run programming ==
The majority of programming listed below previously aired on other Sky UK channels. The list includes both Sky originals and acquired programming.

- 30 Rock (Note: Previously aired on Comedy Central)
- Animal Control
- The Baby
- Ballers
- Based on a True Story
- Bliss
- Bored to Death
- Bounty Hunters
- The Brink
- Camping
- Community (Note: Previously aired on Sony Entertainment Television)
- Crashing
- Dice
- Divorce
- Eastbound & Down (Note: Previously aired on Fox UK)
- Enlightened
- Entourage
- Everybody Hates Chris (Note: Previously aired on ITV)
- Flight of the Conchords (Note: Previously aired on BBC Four)
- Frayed
- The Fresh Prince Of Bel-Air (Note: Previously aired on BBC Two)
- Futurama
- Girls
- Hacks
- Hello Ladies
- High Maintenance
- House of Lies
- How To Make It In America
- Hunderby
- Hung (Note: Previously aired on Channel 4)
- I'm Dying Up Here
- In the Long Run
- Kidding
- Looking
- The Mindy Project (Note: Previously aired on E4)
- Modern Family
- Mrs. Fletcher
- New Zealand Spy
- The Office
- The Paper
- Parks and Recreation (Note: Previously aired on Dave)
- The Reluctant Landlord
- Resident Alien
- Saturday Night Live UK
- Sex and the City
- Silicon Valley
- Ted (23 November 2026)
- Togetherness
- A Touch of Cloth
- The Trip
- Trollied
- Two Weeks to Live
- Veep
- Vice Principals
- Will & Grace (Note: Previously aired on Channel 4 (series 1–8) and Comedy Central (series 9–11))
- Yonderland
