= The Overlook (collection) =

1999 fashion collection by Alexander McQueen

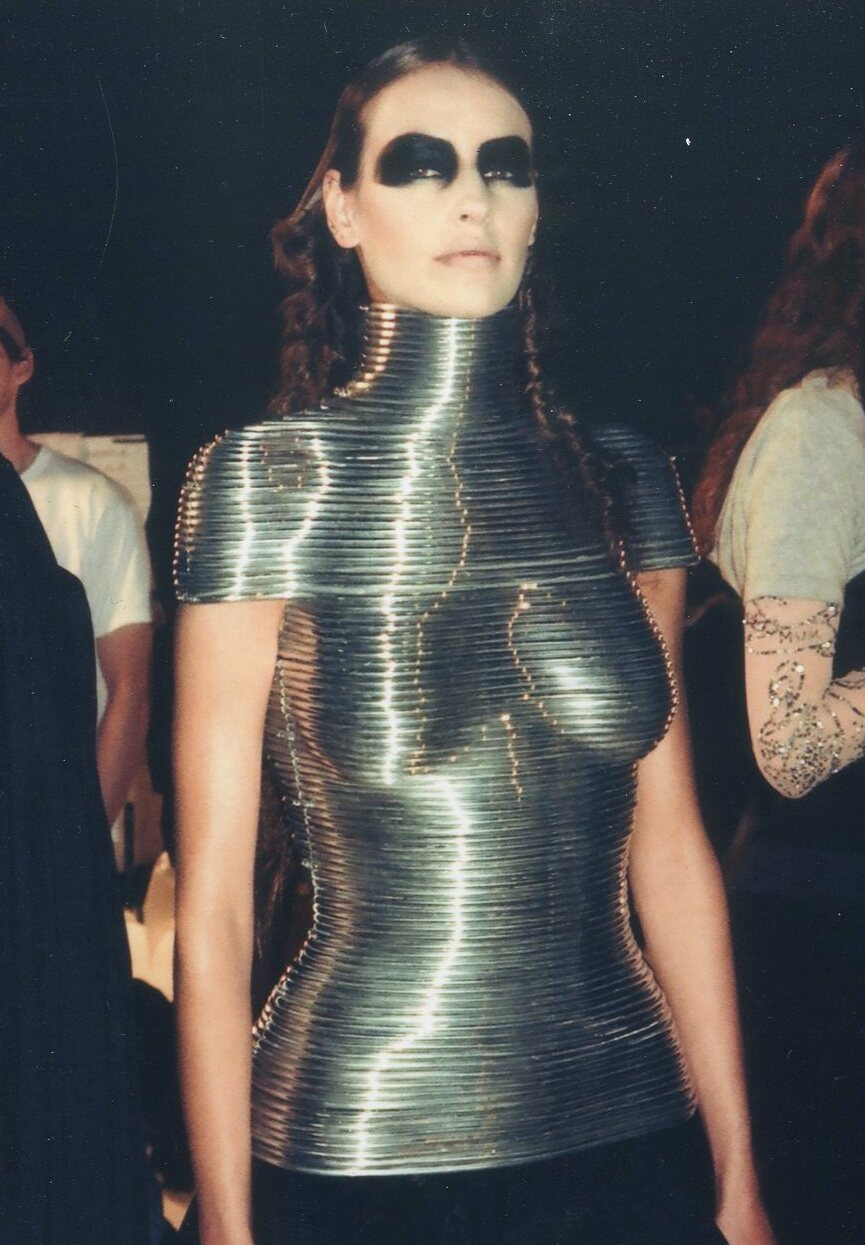
The coiled corset from Look 47 of The Overlook, pictured backstage at the 2004 McQueen retrospective show Black

The Overlook is the fourteenth collection by British fashion designer Alexander McQueen, released for the Autumn/Winter 1999 season of his eponymous fashion house. It was inspired by the Stanley Kubrick horror film The Shining (1980) and named for the fictional Overlook Hotel where much of the film takes place. The collection focused on winter clothing in light and neutral colours, including chunky knitwear, fur and shearling coats, and parkas inspired by Inuit clothing. Showpiece items included a bustier made from rock crystal and a corset made from coils of aluminium, the latter provided by jeweller and frequent McQueen collaborator Shaun Leane.

The runway show was staged on 23 February 1999 at Gatliff Road Warehouse in London. Several celebrities attended, including Vogue editor Anna Wintour, who was making her first appearance at a McQueen show. The square stage was enclosed by a large Lucite box. The inside, lit by thousands of candles, was dressed to look like a birch forest in winter, complete with artificial snow and an icy floor. Production was handled by McQueen's usual creative team. Seventy-three looks were presented in the main runway show, interrupted by a brief entr'acte during which several models skated around the enclosure. (Note: For convenience, when referring to individual looks, this article uses the numbering from the Vogue retrospective of the collection. For unknown reasons, their overview omits some looks that are shown in the official runway video. Look numbers mentioned in this article have not been adjusted. The following seven looks were omitted from Vogue: a black fur ensemble following Look 3; a taupe shift dress following Look 14; a green dress following Look 17; a grey cowl sweater with black skirt following Look 32; a grey scarf-coat with grey skirt following Look 42; a grey skirt suit following Look 47; and a tailored grey suit following Look 50. Vogue also omits the looks from the skating section in their count. It is not clear from the runway video how many skaters there were, or if any of their outfits reappeared elsewhere in the show.) The show earned a standing ovation, regarded as a rare achievement in the fashion world.

Critical response to the clothing and the runway show for The Overlook was mostly positive, and it is regarded as one of McQueen's most memorable shows. Some observers criticised the collection for being unrealistic, and others objected to the use of real fur. Academic analysis has focused on the show's interpretation of The Shining and themes of isolation through the medium of clothing. The coiled corset was the sole item from The Overlook to appear in the original 2011 staging of the retrospective exhibit Alexander McQueen: Savage Beauty.

== Background ==
British designer Alexander McQueen was known in the fashion industry for his imaginative, sometimes controversial designs. Over the course of his career, which lasted from 1992 until his death in 2010, he explored a broad range of ideas and themes, particularly sexuality, death, violence, romanticism, and historicism. His fashion shows were theatrical to the point of verging on performance art. He began his career in fashion as an apprentice on Savile Row, and the skills he developed there earned him a lifelong reputation as an expert tailor. Early in his career, his runway presentations were violent and shocking, and audiences began to expect his shows to feature macabre dramatics. From October 1996 to October 2001, he was head designer at French luxury design house Givenchy, where he learned le flou, or draping, the dressmaking side of haute couture.

McQueen's personal fixations had a strong influence on his designs and shows, especially his love of film, which he drew on from the beginning of his career with his first commercial collection, Taxi Driver (Autumn/Winter 1993), named for the 1976 Martin Scorsese film. Other explicitly film-inspired collections include The Birds (Spring/Summer 1995), The Hunger (Spring/Summer 1996), Deliverance (Spring/Summer 2004), and The Man Who Knew Too Much (Autumn/Winter 2005).

McQueen often worked with other creatives to produce things outside his area of expertise for runway shows, such as hats or jewellery. He had a light touch with collaborators, providing short creative briefs that permitted latitude for interpretation, and often did not see the work he had commissioned until right before the show. McQueen had a longstanding and particularly close collaboration with jeweller Shaun Leane, who had worked with him as early as Highland Rape (Autumn/Winter 1995). The two met during their student years; Leane was trained as a classical goldsmith who worked in traditional formats, but McQueen encouraged him to branch out into other materials and shapes.

== Concept and creative process ==
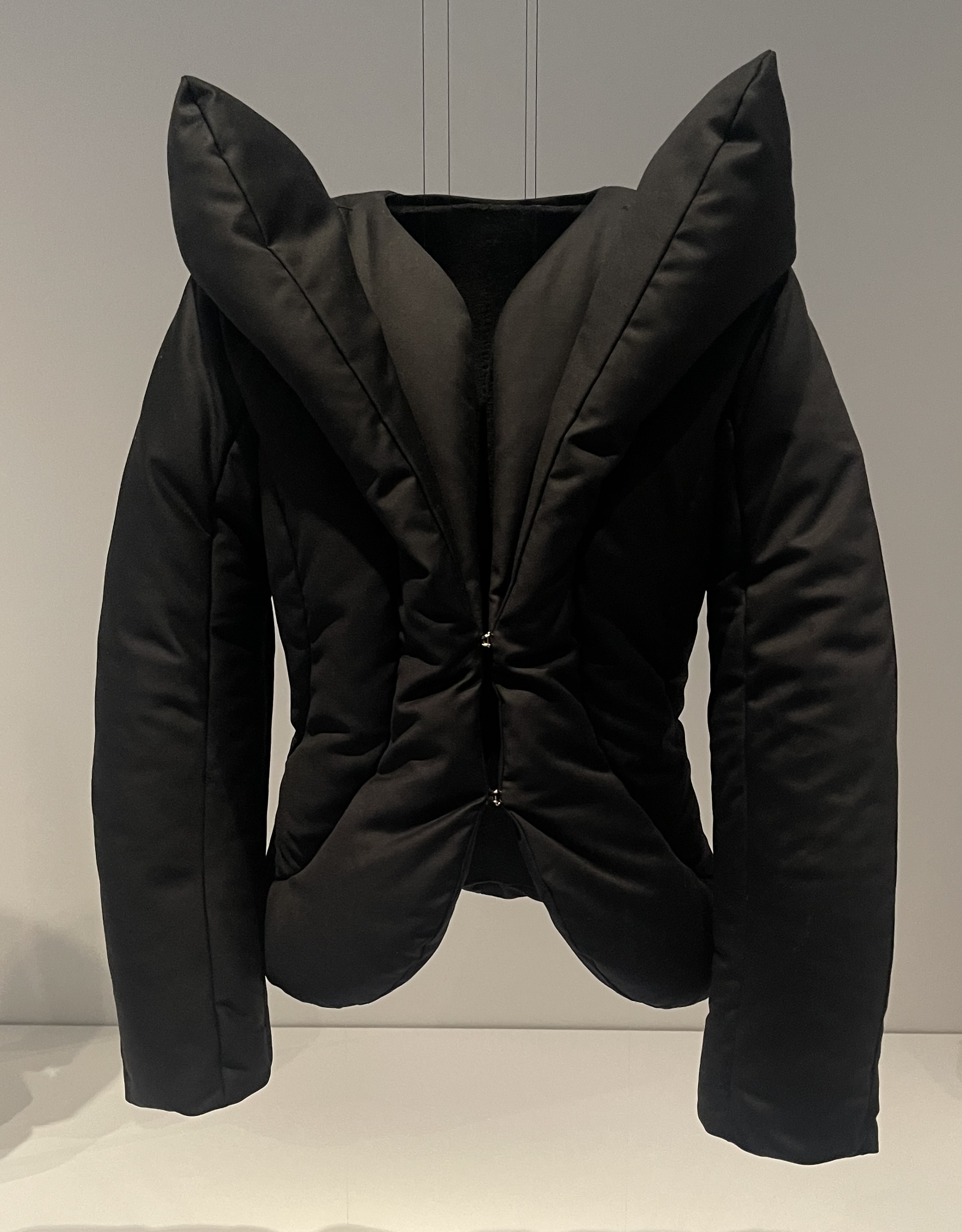
Puffer jacket from Look 10, presented at Lee Alexander McQueen: Mind, Mythos, Muse at Musée des beaux-arts du Québec

The Overlook (Autumn/Winter 1999) was the fourteenth collection by McQueen for his eponymous fashion house. It was inspired by the Stanley Kubrick horror film The Shining (1980) and named after the fictional Overlook Hotel where much of the film takes place. McQueen stated that the collection was intended to echo the film's "sense of isolation and obscurity". Separately, he said that he "wanted to confront misconceptions of size and matter" with the collection. Journalist Suzy Menkes suggested the emphasis on knitwork and embroidery may have been drawn from the Arts and Crafts movement, which had strongly influenced McQueen's previous collection, No. 13 (Spring/Summer 1999).

Although The Shining is known for its dark and violent subject matter, McQueen surprised the audience by instead taking inspiration from its wintery, isolated setting, while making several visual references to the film. He referenced the film's ghostly sisters in Look 40, which featured a pair of identically styled models walking hand in hand. Hexagonal shapes reflected the Overlook Hotel's carpet pattern. The show concluded with an artificial snowstorm reminiscent of the blizzard that ends the film.

The palette was primarily light and neutral colours: black, white, grey, and soft pink. The collection focused on romantic interpretations of winter clothing and pseudo-skiwear: garments made from thick jersey, chunky knitted items, and parkas inspired by Inuit clothing. McQueen incorporated materials sourced from animals, including crocodile skin, leather, rabbit fur, and shearling. As was typical with McQueen, there was a heavy emphasis on tailored garments, especially frock coats and fit and flare dresses. One frock coat had a fanned tail, referencing McQueen's love of birds and asymmetrical designs. Skirts were pleated or bubbled, making them voluminous. McQueen's signature low-rise "bumster" trousers also made an appearance. Other repeated design elements included patchwork garments, painted and embroidered roses, Swarovski crystal decorations, and garments made from metal. The boots worn by the models had heels resembling ice skate blades.

== Runway show ==
=== Production details ===
The runway show was staged on 23 February 1999 at Gatliff Road Warehouse in London. It was dedicated to Stanley Kubrick, then recently deceased. The show's invitation was a sheet of white A4 paper with the proverb "all work and no play makes Jack a dull boy" typed repeatedly, echoing the way Shining protagonist Jack Torrance obsessively types the phrase while losing his mind. There were technical issues backstage, including a small fire and a malfunctioning artificial snow machine, although these were resolved without interrupting the show. Several celebrities attended, including Kate Winslet, Helen Mirren, Cate Blanchett, Grace Jones, and members of trip hop group Massive Attack. Industry figures in attendance included Nicole Fischelis, fashion director of the department store Saks Fifth Avenue, and Vogue editor Anna Wintour, who was making her first appearance at a McQueen show. McQueen's mother Joyce was also in the audience.

McQueen typically worked with a consistent creative team for his shows. Katy England was responsible for overall styling, while Gainsbury & Whiting oversaw production. Joseph Bennett returned for set design. Nicolas Jurnjack styled hair, while Val Garland, a frequent McQueen collaborator, handled makeup. Jeweller Shaun Leane produced jewellery and metalwork, and product designer Kees van der Graaf returned to create a bodice made from rock crystal.

The soundtrack mostly relied on orchestral music from The Shining, including the 1934 version of "Midnight, The Stars and You" with Al Bowlly and Ray Noble and his Orchestra. The sound of wolves howling and wind blowing was added to the mix. Because the vinyl release of the film's soundtrack was difficult to find at the time, sound designer John Gosling had to pull the music from VHS tapes. McQueen took his bow to the Frank Sinatra song "Come Fly with Me".

=== Catwalk presentation ===
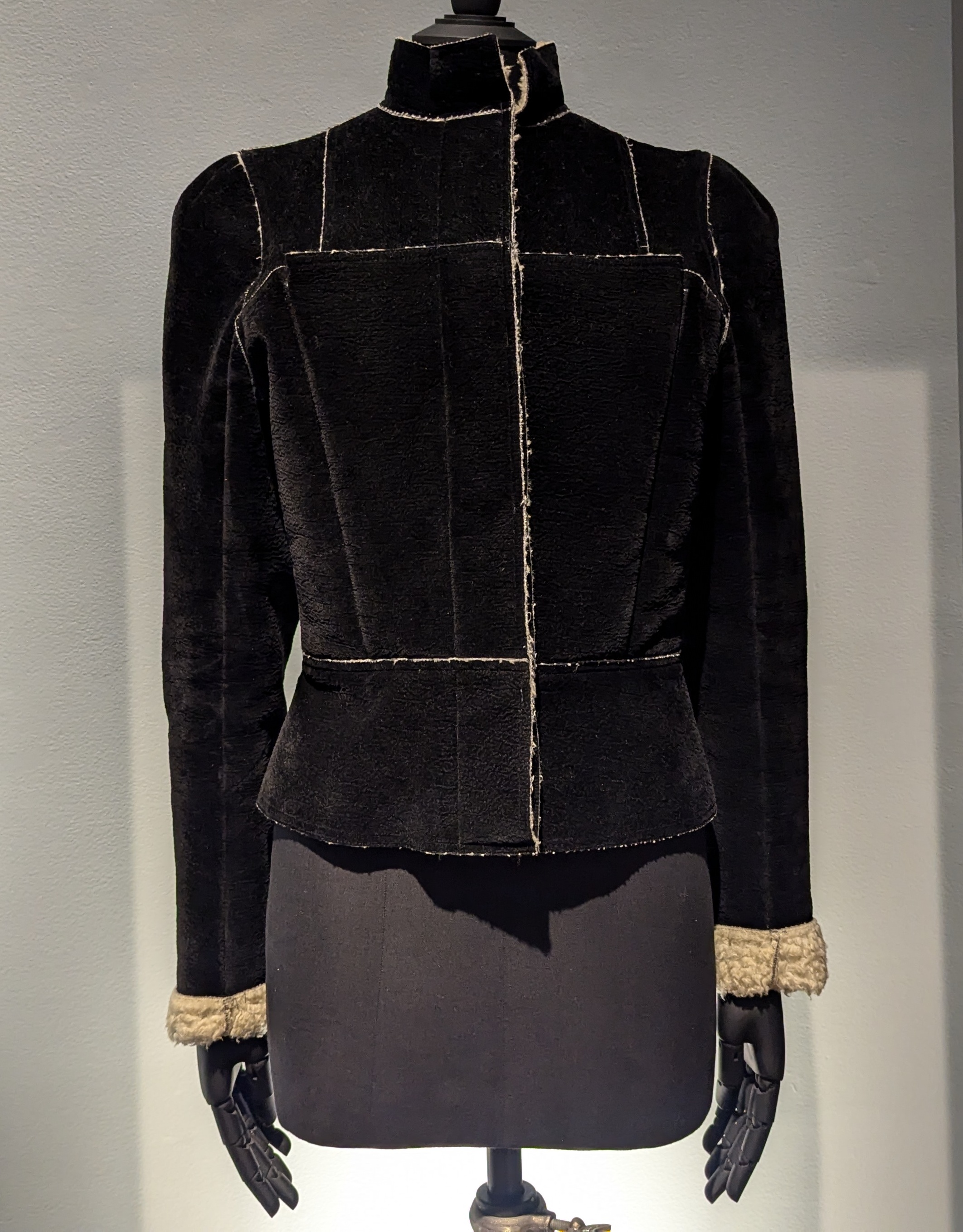
Black faux leather and shearling jacket, presented at Lee Alexander McQueen & Ann Ray - Rendez-Vous (2024)

The square stage was enclosed by a 20-foot (6 m) Lucite box; it was the first of two collections which McQueen staged this way. The inside, lit by thousands of candles, was dressed to look like a birch forest in winter, with 25 tons of artificial snow and an icy floor. In a 2018 interview with Vogue, model Frankie Rayder recalled McQueen surprising her with the ice during a pre-show conversation:

"I was walking with Lee before the show," remembers Rayder, "and he's like, 'So you're going to open the show and you are walking on this.' I said, 'On ice? Are you joking? Are there spikes on the bottom of these shoes?!' His response: 'No. You're from Wisconsin.'"

Models were styled with braided grey hair and silver paint over their eyes, eyelashes, eyebrows, and lower foreheads, resembling masks or stripes of ice. Fashion theorist Janice Miller felt that the connotations of transformation and concealment associated with masks made the makeup "strange, beautiful, and wistful". Curator Kate Bethune considered the faintly Native American look of the models' braided hair and exaggerated face makeup to be a reference to the cursed Native American burial ground on which the film's Overlook Hotel was built.

Seventy-three looks were presented in the main runway show. The show opened with roughly a dozen outfits in black, including a sleeveless high-necked bodice of crocodile skin paired with a leather skirt. These looks were followed by a phase of garments in soft brown, taupe, and pink. A section of looks in grey followed, including several showpiece items. Look 38 was a metallic sculpted bodice trimmed with fur. Look 40 featured a pair of models, styled identically with red hair, shaved eyebrows, and grey dresses walking hand in hand. The others were Shaun Leane's work: a metal corset made from coils of aluminium (Look 47) and a knee-length aluminium skirt with laser-cut arabesques (Look 50).

After Look 53, the lights went down, and there was a three-minute entr'acte in which a group of seven models led by professional skater Marika Humphreys skated around the stage. When the skating ended, the music cut out. The lights came back up, flickering, accompanied by an artificial snowstorm and the sound of howling wolves. The show resumed with Look 54, a bodice made of rock crystal worn with McQueen's signature low-rise "bumster" trousers in white, followed by another eleven looks all in white. The show earned a standing ovation, regarded as a rare achievement in the fashion world.

=== Notable pieces ===
The rock crystal bustier and the coiled corset – which McQueen called the "Cossack ensemble" – are the most significant pieces from the show. Both were made using body casts of model Laura Morgan which had been produced for No. 13 by van der Graaf. McQueen was known for giving extremely simple creative briefs and allowing his collaborators the freedom to interpret them creatively. Van der Graaf recalled his brief for the bodice from Look 54 as being little more than McQueen asking him "how 'bout a crystal bodice?". He thought of rough quartz rock crystals, only later learning that McQueen had had Swarovski crystals in mind. He told interviewer Lousie Rytter that McQueen's "brevity gave me room to manoeuvre".

Leane built the aluminium corset over the course of six weeks, working 16-hour days. McQueen had requested that he interpret the neck rings traditionally worn by the Southern Ndebele people into an item that covered the entire torso. Leane had previously made a coiled neck ring with a similar brief for McQueen's Autumn/Winter 1997 collection It's a Jungle Out There. The coiled corset was the largest thing Leane, a goldsmith who normally worked at a much smaller scale, had made up to that point. Each of the more than 90 aluminium coils that went into the corset were individually forged and fitted to the body cast for a precise shape.

The corset was made in two halves which screwed together at the sides. Putting it on or removing it could take up to 15 minutes. The fit was so exact that Morgan, who wore the finished version on the runway, said her "chest pushed against the metal when she breathed in". The restrictive corset limited the wearer's ability to move her head and arms. Morgan recalled the experience as empowering: "it's almost like it forces you to pay attention, forces you to be present, and be there, and be what you are. It's very commanding." Leane recalled that in the excitement after the show, he and McQueen headed to the pub to celebrate and forgot to remove Morgan from the corset until someone came to find them.

Curator Clare Phillips described the coiled corset as an example of primitivism in McQueen's work, given its origins in African neck jewellery. She felt it "exudes invulnerability and an untouchable remoteness" while blurring the line between jewellery and clothing. Fashion theorist Harold Koda argued that the restrictiveness of the corset was reminiscent of "the stiff hieratic imagery in Russian Orthodox icons".

== Reception ==
Contemporary reception for The Overlook was mostly positive, many critics responding equally well to the runway show and the clothing. Several highlighted the collection as the best or most impressive of London Fashion Week that year. Others predicted that it would be remembered as some of McQueen's best work. Anna Wintour, although reputedly difficult to please, said she "adored it" and called it a "tour de force for McQueen". Susannah Frankel of The Independent called The Overlook McQueen's "most unashamedly pretty collection to date". Anne-Marie Schiro wrote in The New York Times that the runway show and clothing together had been worth travelling to London for. In the International Herald Tribune, Suzy Menkes felt the show had everything: "a spectacular presentation, an original interpretation and inventive clothes". In The Sydney Morning Herald, Jane De Teliga wrote that the "show had a strange, edgy beauty" and called McQueen the "leading light of British fashion". Spencer felt the show would impress even the celebrities in the audience, highlighting the tailored designs in particular.

Reviews noted that the collection was both artistic and commercially viable. This was a positive development for McQueen, whose designs were notorious for being creative but unwearable. Robert O'Byrne of The Irish Times wrote that the "superlative tailoring and cutting of unrivalled mastery" of the designs would appeal to consumers. Mimi Spencer of the Evening Standard thought the puffer jackets would be a popular item for the winter. Some reviewers felt that the skills McQueen was learning at Givenchy had influenced the designs for the better. Menkes argued that McQueen's time there had enabled him to match his signature styles to the winter theme. Armstrong found the clothing "had a light, assured touch and elegance" that surpassed what McQueen was doing in his collections for Givenchy.

The theatrical runway show drew a great deal of critical commentary in its own right. Several critics appreciated how McQueen subverted the audience's expectations by avoiding explicit horror and instead drawing inspiration from the film's unsettling atmosphere. John Davidson at The Herald of Glasgow found the lack of shock elements to be evidence of McQueen's growing maturity. He wrote that McQueen's designs gave the skating portion a "poetic quality", elevating it from kitsch. The staff writer at Women's Wear Daily (WWD) said the collection "combined his new romantic mood with those trademark touches of the bizarre". Lisa Armstrong, writing for The Times of London, described the paired models from Look 40 as one of the "few freakish McQueen moments" from a show whose mood was otherwise romantic. The WWD staff and Armstrong felt that McQueen had achieved the difficult feat of topping his critically acclaimed previous collection, No. 13. O'Byrne called it McQueen's "best show in years".

The Overlook attracted some criticism for being unrealistic and using fur. Lou Winwood of The Guardian, Karen Hall at the Windsor Star, and Jane Moore at The Sun dismissed all of the collections shown at London Fashion Week that season as being unrealistic and unappealing for everyday consumers, although Winwood did appreciate the runway show. Although O'Byrne's review was positive, he worried that McQueen's penchant for showmanship threatened to overshadow his talent for design. Some critics disliked the showpiece items. Lesley Downer found them "oddities" in an otherwise mature collection, and Hall complained that the coiled corset made its wearer look like she had been "bound and gagged by Slinkies". Other reviewers disapproved of the use of real fur. Winwood wrote that "animals rights campaigners will be less than impressed" with the rabbit fur and crocodile skin. An unbylined piece in the Scottish Daily Record complained that McQueen was only using fur to chase publicity, and doubted that it had much appeal for the average British consumer.

The show is viewed positively in retrospect. In the biography Alexander McQueen: The Life and the Legacy, Judith Watt regarded it as a commercially oriented collection, as McQueen was about to open a brand-new flagship store. She wrote that "some pronounced it his best show" but disagreed; although she found The Overlook aesthetically and narratively successful, she considered Voss (Spring/Summer 2001) – also staged in a clear plastic box – to be "the real magic". Chloe Fox, in her book Vogue on McQueen, called The Overlook evidence that McQueen was "a designer who was increasingly becoming an artist". Journalist Maureen Callahan wrote that it was "some of the most striking work of his career". Andrew Wilson, another of McQueen's biographers, called The Overlook one of McQueen's "most memorable" shows, along with Voss and No. 13.

== Analysis ==
I didn't know that [collections like Overlook] would change the course of fashion shows, but to be a part of this . . . I don't want to speak for anyone else, but I felt like I was part of something special even before the special thing happened—even just being asked to do it. [You knew] you would kind of have to put your ego aside, and [that] you weren't going to look gorgeous, but everyone was willing to do that. It was art, you know.

— Model Frankie Rayder, speaking of The Overlook in a 2018 interview with Vogue

Curator Claire Wilcox found that the separation created by the Lucite enclosure called to mind the "otherworldly reality of a dream". Fashion journalist Alex Fury argued that McQueen often staged spectacles that separated the audience from the models in a way that evoked screen-based media such as cinema, offering The Overlook and Voss as examples. Literature professor Catherine Spooner cited The Overlook as an example of how McQueen drew Gothic influence from films.

Fashion historian Alistair O'Neill discussed how The Overlook reflects The Shining in multiple ways. As well as its explicit references to The Shining, The Overlook reflected the film through music and performance elements which evoked the way the film distorted time by presenting scenes that "destabiliz[ed] any sense of how long Jack [Torrance] really has been staying at the hotel". In The Overlook, McQueen's use of the film's soundtrack served to "decelerate and extend" the experience of time within the runway show. The skating segment interrupted the usual sequence of a fashion show. It used the same song, "Midnight, the Stars, and You", that played during a time-distortion sequence in the film, connecting the two thematically. Finally, O'Neill identifies Look 43 – a plaid wool dress – as referential to McQueen's prior collection Highland Rape (Autumn/Winter 1995) and his experience as an apprentice tailor. This, he suggests, blends history with the present in a similar way to the film, slightly distorted like a composite photo. He felt the collection "marked a high point" for fashion and for interpreting film through other media.

Researcher Lisa Skogh noted that McQueen often incorporated concepts and objects which might have appeared in a cabinet of curiosities – collections of natural and historical objects that were the precursor to modern museums. She identified the quartz crystal bodice in Look 54 as an example of what would be called "artificialia" in such a context: a man-made object which incorporated "a natural hardstone rarity". She likened the bodice to an artificial mountain commissioned in the early 17th century by diplomat Philipp Hainhofer as a gift to King Gustavus Adolphus of Sweden.

Fashion historian Ingrid Loschek regarded The Overlook as an example of how McQueen portrayed "traumata such as isolation and loneliness" through the medium of clothing. Fashion theorists Adam Geczy and Vicki Karaminas compared The Overlook to What a Merry-Go-Round (Autumn/Winter 2001) as narratives of the "loss of childhood innocence". Aesthetically, they found The Overlook reminded them of the White Witch, a villain from the Chronicles of Narnia series of children's books. (Note: The authors incorrectly refer to the character as the "Ice Queen".) Cultural theologian Robert Covolo described McQueen's use of twin models in The Overlook as evidence of McQueen's career-long ambivalence toward conventional standards of beauty. A trio of Iranian academics analysed the coiled corset as an example of duality in McQueen's designs: its armored appearance evokes aggression, while the curved shape mirrored the softer female body.

== Aftermath and legacy ==
Before the show, McQueen had announced that his next collection, Eye (Spring/Summer 2000), would be presented at New York Fashion Week instead of in London. Many fashion journalists were concerned about the potential impact that his departure would have on London Fashion Week. McQueen viewed this as a step toward developing the brand internationally and was clear from the outset that he intended to return to England the following season.

The collection is regarded as one of McQueen's most memorable. In 2015, Dazed magazine selected the silver eye makeup from The Overlook as one of McQueen's best catwalk makeup looks. i-D magazine named it an iconic winter collection in 2017. Shaun Leane published a retrospective of his career in 2020; discussing it with British Vogue, he selected an image of the model being screwed into the coiled corset as his favourite in the book. He reflected on the contrast captured in the image: "she is almost angelic but being prepared for battle". A 2022 British Vogue article called The Overlook one of McQueen's "most fantastical catwalk moments".

When McQueen and Leane participated in the Fashion in Motion series at the Victoria and Albert Museum (V&A) in 2001, they presented the coiled corset as one of their featured items. The coiled corset was the sole item from The Overlook to appear in the original 2011 staging of the retrospective exhibit Alexander McQueen: Savage Beauty at the Metropolitan Museum of Art, courtesy of Shaun Leane; it also appeared at the revised 2015 staging at the V&A. Leane called it his favourite item from the exhibition. A puffer jacket from Look 10 appeared in the 2022 exhibit Lee Alexander McQueen: Mind, Mythos, Muse, where curators compared it to a quilted, puffy eiderdown jacket made by British designer Charles James in 1937.

In 2017, Leane auctioned a number of pieces he had created for the house at Sotheby's in New York. The coiled corset sold for $807,000. An invitation to the show sold at RR Auction in 2021 for a reported $500.

== Bibliography ==
- Alexander McQueen | Women's Autumn/Winter 1999 | Runway Show. Alexander McQueen. 12 March 2012 – via YouTube.
- Bolton, Andrew (2011). Alexander McQueen: Savage Beauty. New York City: Metropolitan Museum of Art. ISBN 978-1-58839-412-5. OCLC 687693871.
- Callahan, Maureen (2014). Champagne Supernovas: Kate Moss, Marc Jacobs, Alexander McQueen, and the '90s Renegades Who Remade Fashion. New York City: Touchstone Books. ISBN 978-1-4516-4053-3.
- Covolo, Robert (June 2014). "Beyond the low-rise jean: Traces of resurrection on the catwalks of the late Alexander McQueen". The Other Journal (23: Body). Wipf and Stock Publishers: 30–37. ISBN 978-1-63087-237-3.
- Esguerra, Clarissa M.; Hansen, Michaela (2022). Lee Alexander McQueen: Mind, Mythos, Muse. New York City: Delmonico Books. ISBN 978-1-63681-018-8. OCLC 1289986708.
- Evans, Caroline (2003). Fashion at the Edge: Spectacle, Modernity and Deathliness. New Haven, Connecticut: Yale University Press. ISBN 978-0-300-10192-8.
- Fairer, Robert; Wilcox, Claire (2016). Alexander McQueen: Unseen. New Haven, Connecticut: Yale University Press. ISBN 978-0-300-22267-8. OCLC 946216643.
- Fox, Chloe (2012). Vogue On: Alexander McQueen. Vogue on Designers. London: Quadrille Publishing. ISBN 978-1849491136. OCLC 828766756.
- Geczy, Adam; Karaminas, Vicki (2019). Fashion Installation: Body, Space, and Performance. London: Bloomsbury Visual Arts. ISBN 978-1-350-03253-8.
- Gleason, Katherine (2012). Alexander McQueen: Evolution. New York City: Race Point Publishing. ISBN 978-1-61058-837-9. OCLC 783147416.
- Koda, Harold (2001). Extreme Beauty: The Body Transformed. New York City: Metropolitan Museum of Art. ISBN 978-0-300-10312-0.
- Loschek, Ingrid (2009). When Clothes Become Fashion: Design and Innovation Systems. Oxford: Berg Publishers. doi:10.2752/9781847883681. ISBN 978-0-85785-144-4.
- Mora, Juliana Luna; Berry, Jess (2 September 2022). "Creative Direction Succession in Luxury Fashion: The Illusion of Immortality at Chanel and Alexander McQueen". Luxury. 9 (2–3): 117–140. doi:10.1080/20511817.2022.2194039. ISSN 2051-1817.
- Sayahi, Sareh; Afhami, Reza; Farbod, Farinaz (December 2025). "A Comparative Analysis of the Phenomenology of Women's Bodies in Conceptual Fashion from Mark Johnson's Perspective: A Case Study of the Works of Rei Kawakubo, Alexander McQueen, and Hussein Chalayan". Journal of Woman in Culture and Arts (in Persian). 17 (4). Center for Women and Family Studies, University of Tehran: 461–480.
- Thomas, Dana (2015). Gods and Kings: The Rise and Fall of Alexander McQueen and John Galliano. New York City: Penguin Publishing. ISBN 978-1-101-61795-3. OCLC 951153602.
- Watt, Judith (2012). Alexander McQueen: The Life and the Legacy. New York City: Harper Design. ISBN 978-1-84796-085-6. OCLC 892706946.
- Wilcox, Claire, ed. (2015). Alexander McQueen. New York City: Abrams Books. ISBN 978-1-4197-1723-9. OCLC 891618596.
  - Bethune, Kate. "Encyclopedia of Collections". In Wilcox (2015), pp. 303–326.
  - Evans, Caroline. "Modelling McQueen: Hard Grace". In Wilcox (2015), pp. 189–201.
  - Fury, Alex. "Show, and Tell". In Wilcox (2015), pp. 220–233.
  - Miller, Janice. "Making-Up". In Wilcox (2015), pp. 234–241.
  - O'Neill, Alistair. "The Shining and Chic". In Wilcox (2015), pp. 261–280.
  - Phillips, Clare. "Armouring the Body". In Wilcox (2015), pp. 202–209.
  - Skogh, Lisa. "Museum of the Mind". In Wilcox (2015), pp. 178–188.
  - Spooner, Catherine. "A Gothic Mind". In Wilcox (2015), pp. 141–158.
- Wilson, Andrew (2015). Alexander McQueen: Blood Beneath the Skin. New York City: Simon and Schuster. ISBN 978-1-4767-7674-3. OCLC 1310585849.
