= Azagury =

Azagury is a Moroccan surname. Notable people with the surname include:

- Elie Azagury (1918–2009), Moroccan architect
- Jacques Azagury, Moroccan-born fashion designer
- Solange Azagury-Partridge, British designer
