= All That Glitters: Britain's Next Jewellery Star series 1 =

All That Glitters: Britain's Next Jewellery Star
- Season 1
- No. of episodes: 6

Release
- Original network: BBC Two
- Original release: 13 April – 18 May 2021

Series chronology
- Next → Series 2

The first series of All That Glitters: Britain's Next Jewellery Star started on 13 April 2021 and aired for six episodes concluding on 18 May 2021. The series was hosted by Katherine Ryan and the judges were Shaun Leane and Solange Azagury-Partridge.

== Jewellers ==
| Jeweller | Age | Occupation | Hometown |
|---|---|---|---|
| Dan Musselwhite | 40 | Contemporary jewellery designer | Somerset |
| Hugo Johnson | 23 | Diamond mounter | Hayward's Heath |
| Kim Styles | 46 | Sculptural jeweller | Portsmouth |
| Lee | 49 | Jewellery business owner | South Wales |
| Naomi | 23 | Trainee goldsmith | Sussex |
| Nicola | 25 | Art graduate | Hereford |
| Sonny Bailey-Aird | 26 | Trained goldsmith | North London |
| Tamara Gomez | 47 | Jewellery business owner | Central London |

== Results and eliminations ==
Elimination chart
| Jeweller | Episode 1 | Episode 2 | Episode 3 | Episode 4 | Episode 5 | Episode 6 |
|---|---|---|---|---|---|---|
| Hugo | | Winner | | Winner | | Winner |
| Dan | Winner | | | | | Runner-up |
| Tamara | | | Winner | | Winner | Runner-up |
| Sonny | | | | | OUT | |
| Lee | | | | OUT | | |
| Nicola | | | OUT | | | |
| Kim | | OUT | | | | |
| Naomi | OUT | | | | | |

Colour key

Jeweller of the Week
Jeweller got through to the next round
Jeweller was eliminated
Jeweller was the series runner-up
Jeweller was the series winner

== Episodes ==
Jeweller eliminated
Jeweller of the week
Winner

=== Episode 1 ===
The Best Seller challenge was to create a set of three individual, but thematically similar, bangles. The Bespoke Brief was to make a pendant for a foster mother, to wear when she was being presented with an MBE.

| Jeweller | Best Seller (Silver Bangles) | Bespoke Brief (Pendant) |
|---|---|---|
| Dan | Bee Bangles | Fairy Cave Pendant |
| Hugo | Movement Bangles | Spiral Goddess Pendant |
| Kim | British Tree Bangles | Nature Pendant |
| Lee | Seaside Bangles | Home Sweet Home Pendant |
| Naomi | Signature Bangles | Floral Pendant |
| Nicola | Architectural Bangles | Kingtsugi Pendant |
| Sonny | Bauhaus Bangles | Flying Wings Pendant |
| Tamara | Ancient Egyptian Bangles | Rainbow of Hope Pendant |

=== Episode 2 ===
The Best Seller challenge was to make a chain collar, featuring three different sized links of any shape or size. The Bespoke Brief was to make a sweetheart brooch for a househusband to give to his wife while she is away on military service.

| Jeweller | Best Seller (Chain Collar) | Bespoke Brief (Sweetheart Brooch) |
|---|---|---|
| Dan | Angular Chain Collar | Penguin & Holly Brooch |
| Hugo | Russian Band Chain Collar | Penguin on a Treble Clef Brooch |
| Kim | Daisy Chain Collar | Pebble & Holly Brooch |
| Lee | Triangular Chain Collar | Penguin Heart Brooch |
| Nicola | Rain Chain Collar | Map of Europe Brooch |
| Sonny | Silver & Gold Chain Collar | Family of Penguins Brooch |
| Tamara | Loop in Loop Chain Collar | Military Charms Brooch |

=== Episode 3 ===
The Best Seller challenge was to make a cocktail ring using alternate materials. The Bespoke Brief was to create a bib necklace for a drag artist to wear for their first solo performance.

| Jeweller | Best Seller (Cocktail Ring) | Bespoke Brief (Bib Necklace) |
|---|---|---|
| Dan | Poisonous Orchid Cocktail Ring | Leather Leaf Bib Necklace |
| Hugo | By the Seashore Cocktail Ring | Middle Eastern Bib Necklace |
| Lee | Glorious Glass Cocktail Ring | Colour & Coils Bib Necklace |
| Nicola | Paper Gemstones Cocktail Ring | Cable Tie Chain Bib Necklace |
| Sonny | Skull of Copper Cocktail Ring | Egyptian Goddess Bib Necklace |
| Tamara | Honest Ivory Cocktail Ring | Cleopatra Bib Necklace |

=== Episode 4 ===
The Best Seller challenge was to make hoop earrings, using 9-carat gold. The Bespoke Brief was to create a locket to give to a bone-marrow donor.

| Jeweller | Best Seller (Hoop Earrings) | Bespoke Brief (Locket) |
|---|---|---|
| Dan | Rippling Hoop Earrings | Geometric Locket |
| Hugo | Dragonfly Hoop Earrings | Petals of Friendship Locket |
| Lee | Cosmic Hoop Earrings | Stem Cells Locket |
| Sonny | Ancient Hoop Earrings | Egg of Life Locket |
| Tamara | Crescent Moon Hoop Earrings | Secret Note Sphere Locket |

=== Episode 5 ===
The Best Seller challenge was to make a cuff out of silver, and featuring at least five gemstones. The Bespoke Brief was to create an engagement ring, with gold and a 1 carat diamond.

| Jeweller | Best Seller (Cuff) | Bespoke Brief (Engagement Ring) |
|---|---|---|
| Dan | Geometric Shapes Cuff | Hidden Star |
| Hugo | Beach & Surf Cuff | Maple Leaves |
| Sonny | Night Sky Cuff | Love Twist |
| Tamara | Watermelon Cuff | Ancient Gold |

=== Episode 6: Final ===
The Best Seller challenge was to make a pair of pearl drop earrings, using gold and either round or baroque pearls. The Bespoke Brief was to create a maang tikka, a traditional piece of Indian bridal jewellery.

| Jeweller | Best Seller (Pearl Drop Earrings) | Bespoke Brief (Maang Tikka) |
|---|---|---|
| Dan | Fluid Pear Drop Earrings | Pearl & Diamond Maang Tikka |
| Hugo | Mountain Snow Drops | Ruby Flower Maang Tikka |
| Tamara | Double Baroque Drops | Mother of Pearl Maang Tikka |
