= All That Glitters: Britain's Next Jewellery Star series 2 =

All That Glitters: Britain's Next Jewellery Star
- Season 2
- No. of episodes: 6

Release
- Original network: BBC Two
- Original release: 25 August – 29 September 2022

Series chronology
- ← Previous; Series 1

The second series of All That Glitters: Britain's Next Jewellery Star started on 25 August 2022 and aired for six episodes concluding on 29 September 2022. The series was hosted by Katherine Ryan and the judges were Shaun Leane and Dinny Hall. Filming took place at the Birmingham School of Jewellery.

== Jewellers ==
Jeweller	Age	Occupation	Hometown
Bonnie Hay	40	Jeweller and metal technician	Birmingham
David Lilly	60	Jeweller and stained-glass window maker	Chichester
Emma White	45	Designer goldsmith and jewellery school owner and teacher	Leeds
Jack Mitchell	35	Jeweller	Bristol
Nyanda 'Rudi' Yekwai	49	Goldsmith	East London
Piers Carpenter	25	Jeweller	Kent
Steve Ali	29	Jeweller	London
Tianne-Louise Simmons	25	Stone setter	Berkshire

== Results and eliminations ==
Elimination chart
Jeweller	Episode 1	Episode 2	Episode 3	Episode 4	Episode 5	Episode 6
Piers			Winner	Winner		Winner
Emma						Runner-up
Jack	Winner				Winner	Runner-up
David					Out	
Bonnie				Out		
Tianne		Winner	Out			
Nyanda		Out				
Steve	Out					

Colour key

Jeweller of the Week
Jeweller got through to the next round
Jeweller was eliminated
Jeweller was the series runner-up
Jeweller was the series winner

== Episodes ==
Jeweller eliminated
Jeweller of the Week
Winner

=== Episode 1 ===
The Best Seller challenge was to make a single statement earring featuring a bezel set cabochon stone. The Bespoke Brief was to make a nameplate necklace.

Jeweller	Best Seller (Single Statement Earring)		Bespoke Brief (Nameplate Necklace)
Bonnie	Birmingham Library Earring	5	Banner for Hannah Nameplate
David	Teardrop Earring	6	Hearts Nameplate
Emma	Peacock Feather Earring	3	Nature Pendant
Jack	Japanese Mountain Earring	1	Self-Confidence Nameplate
Nyanda	Sacred Geometry Earring	7	Floral Pendant
Piers	Wave Earring	2	Flourish Nameplate
Steve	Queen Zenobia Earring	8	Happiness Nameplate
Tianne	Art Deco Earring	4	Bubble Nameplate

=== Episode 2 ===
The Best Seller challenge was to make a spinner ring, with one or more spinning circles on the outside of the ring. The Bespoke Brief was to make a hairpin.

Jeweller	Best Seller (Spinner Ring)		Bespoke Brief (Hairpin)
Bonnie	Leaf Spinner	7	Poppy Hairpin
David	Prayer Wheel Spinner	4	Lion Hairpin
Emma	Decision Making Spinner	5	Lions Mane Hairpin
Jack	Geometric Spinner	3	Floating Feather Hairpin
Nyanda	Tapered Spinner	6	Poppy Hairpin
Piers	Ouroboros Spinner	1	Four Leaf Poppy Hairpin
Tianne	Motorbike Spinner	2	Poppy and Feather Hairpin

=== Episode 3 ===
The Best Seller challenge was to make a pearl necklace with a chain. The Bespoke Brief was to make a sentimental charm bracelet.

Jeweller	Best Seller (Pearl Necklace)		Bespoke Brief (Charm Bracelet)
Bonnie	Paperclip Pearl Necklace	2	Rainbow Charm Bracelet
David	Foxtail Pearl Necklace	3	Circle of Life Charm Bracelet
Emma	Twisted Pearl Necklace	5	Fatima's Hand Charm Bracelet
Jack	Oyster Link Pearl Necklace	1	Phoenix Charm Bracelet
Piers	Asymmetrical Pearl Necklace	4	Rainbow Kintsugi Charm Bracelet
Tianne	Art Deco Pearl Necklace	6	Knight's Tale Charm Bracelet

=== Episode 4 ===
The Best Seller challenge was to make a Birmingham themed brooch. The Bespoke Brief was to make an ear cuff for a client who wears a hearing aid.

Jeweller	Best Seller (Birmingham Themed Brooch)		Bespoke Brief (Ear Cuff)
Bonnie	Roller Pigeon Brooch	5	Origami Ear Cuff
David	BT Tower Brooch	2	Treble Clef Ear Cuff
Emma	Victoria Cross Brooch	1	Teardrop Ear Cuff
Jack	Industrial Brooch	4	Rebellion Ear Cuff
Piers	Anchor Brooch	3	Sound Wave Ear Cuff

=== Episode 5 ===
The Best Seller challenge was to make mismatched earrings, using 9 carat gold and semi-precious gems. The Bespoke Brief was to make a set of cufflinks.

Jeweller	Best Seller (Mismatched Earrings)		Bespoke Brief (Cufflinks)
David	Multiway Earrings	3=	Film Reel & Ski Cufflinks
Emma	Autobiographical Earrings	3=	Diamond & Golden Mile Cufflinks
Jack	Pirate Earrings	1	Masks & Mountains Cufflinks
Piers	Peacock Feather Earrings	2	Gold Film & Theatre Cufflinks

=== Episode 6: Final ===
The Best Seller challenge was to make an engagement ring, using an oval sapphire and 18 carat gold. The Bespoke Brief was to make an occasion necklace, for client Shirley Ballas, using at least one gemstone.

Jeweller	Best Seller (Sapphire Engagement Ring)		Bespoke Brief (Occasion Necklace)
Emma	Ribbon of Life	1	Raunchy Rumba Necklace
Jack	Gender Neutral Structure	2=	100 Piece Chainmail Necklace
Piers	Timeless Asymmetry	2=	Art Deco Centrepiece
