= Metal corset =

Type of corset or bodice

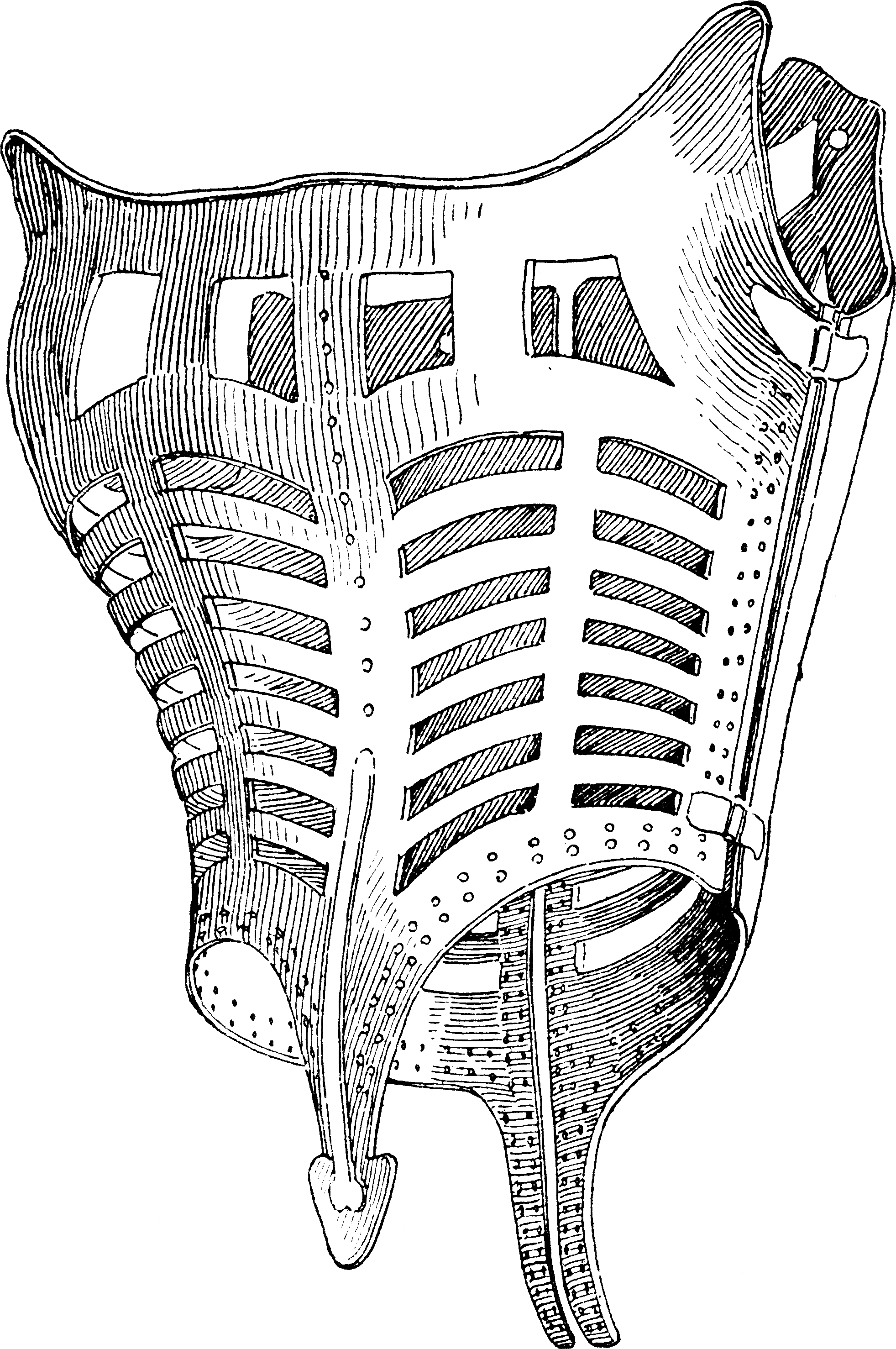
Iron corset in the Musee de Cluny. Drawing made in 1893 by Saint-Elme Gautier.

Metal corsets (also known as iron corsets) are a type of historical corset or bodice made entirely out of metal, usually iron or steel. The metal corset was popularly claimed to have been introduced to France by Catherine de' Medici in the 16th century, although this is now considered a myth. The idea that such garments were worn for fashionable purposes is debatable, with fashion historians now regarding such claims sceptically. Many of the original metal bodices that have survived are now believed to have been intended for medical purposes as orthopaedic support garments and back braces. Such garments were described by the French army surgeon Ambroise Paré in the 16th century as a remedy for the "crookednesse of the Bodie."

Some of the more extreme examples of metal corsets that have survived are now generally thought to be later reproductions designed to appeal to fetishists, rather than garments intended for fashionable wear.

Metal medical corsets were still being made in the 20th century, whilst, since the late 20th century, fashion designers such as Alexander McQueen and Issey Miyake have made contemporary metal bodices and corsets from wire and aluminium coils.

== Origins ==
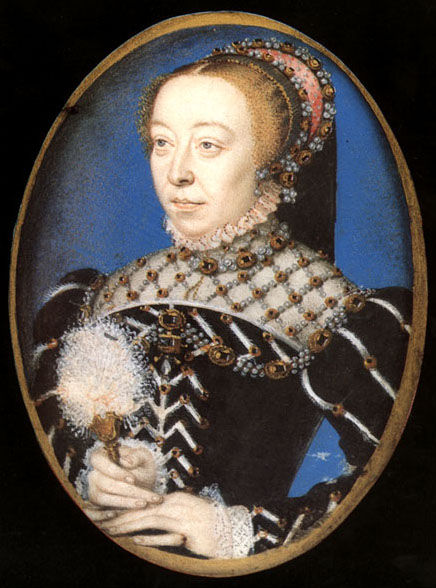
Catherine de' Medici, c. 1555

Early fashion historians and writers have often attributed the introduction of fashionable corset-wearing to Catherine de' Medici, who is said to have brought metal corsets to France from Italy in the 16th century. The fashion historian Valerie Steele noted that after 19th-century writers catering to audiences for tightlacing and sexual fetishism played up the sadomasochistic idea of a "cruel, tortuous fashion" enforced by a dominant queen who demanded unrealistically small waists from her subjects, this mythical royal connection captured public imagination and became part of fashion mythology.

It is now widely believed that authentic metal corsets were intended as a form of orthopaedic brace to address spinal issues such as scoliosis. The 16th-century French army surgeon Ambroise Paré described metal corsets as intended "to amend the crookednesse of the Bodie," recommending that the iron should be perforated in order to make the garments lighter, and that they be made to fit and padded for comfort. Paré criticised the concept of corsetry as a waist-training device, warning that such a practice risked deforming the figure.

== 16th and 17th centuries ==
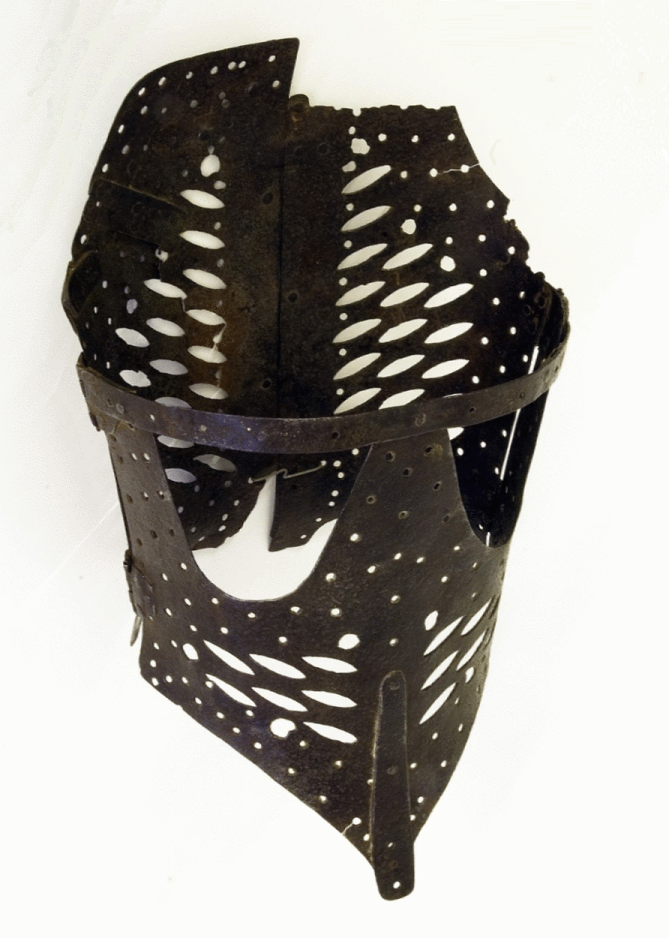
Hinged iron corset with back clasp opening. 1580–99. York Castle Museum.

A steel corset in the Stibbert Museum, Florence, Italy, is dated to the mid-16th century, and thought to be similar to the metal stays recorded as having been made by a corazzaio mastro (master armour-maker) for Eleanor of Toledo, and delivered to her on 28 February 1549. However, as Eleanor's wardrobe records do not list any boned or stiffened corsets, it is thought that her steel bodice was designed for medical or therapeutic reasons rather than worn as a fashionable garment.

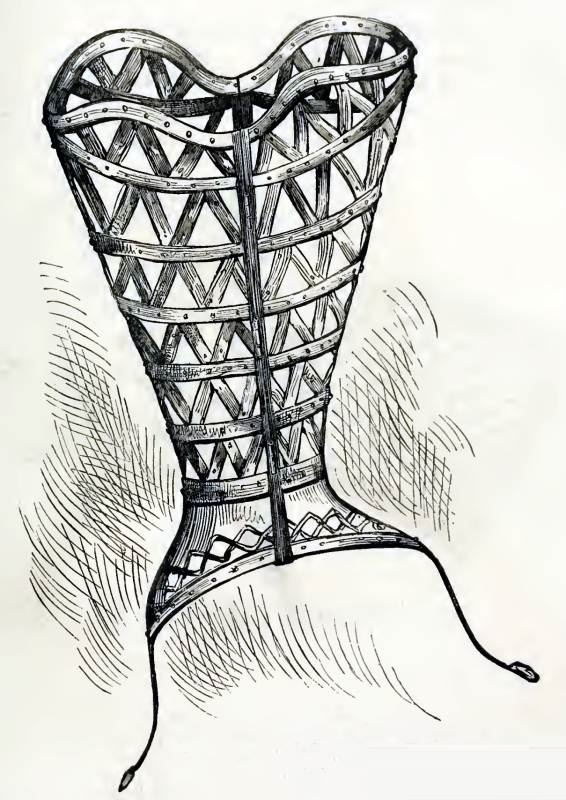
1868 illustration claiming to show a 16th-century steel corset-cover

Although surviving metal bodices are usually dated to the late 16th and early 17th century, Steele has stated that some of the more extreme and elaborate examples are fakes created from the 19th century onwards to cater to fetishistic "fantasies about women imprisoned in metal corsets". For example, Herbert Norris claimed in Tudor Costume and Fashion (1938) that a misbehaving wife would be locked into a metal corset by her husband until she promised to behave. One such iron corset, with a 14 in (360 mm) waist, was acquired by the Fashion Institute of Technology Museum and described as dating from 1580–1600, but is now considered to be a forgery from the turn of the 19th and 20th centuries. Steele noted suspicious similarities between this corset and an illustration first published in 1868 in The Corset and the Crinoline, a "fetishistic" book claiming to offer a historical overview of fashion, and draws parallels between such corsets and fake medieval chastity belts. Harold Koda, the former curator of the Metropolitan Museum of Art's Costume Institute, states that the excessive, mechanically produced regularity of the garment's structure is evidence for its being a 19th-century fabrication. Koda's take on the significant percentage of extant 19th-century metal corsets made in emulation of purported 16th-century models is that they were created to cater to a specialist market, perhaps for inclusion in collector's cabinets.

The fashion historians Cecil Willett Cunnington and his wife Phillis, both medical doctors, also stated firmly that surviving "iron bodies". when not medical garments, were usually "fanciful 'reproductions'", with no proof of their having genuinely been worn. Despite the explicit scepticism of fashion historians such as Steele and the Cunningtons, scholars outside the field of dress history sometimes treat these corsets as legitimate fashion garments. The anthropologist Marianne Thesander concluded that because such bodices fit the fashionable silhouette of their alleged period, they were probably authentic, and served the same purpose as other corsets.

== 18th and 19th century ==
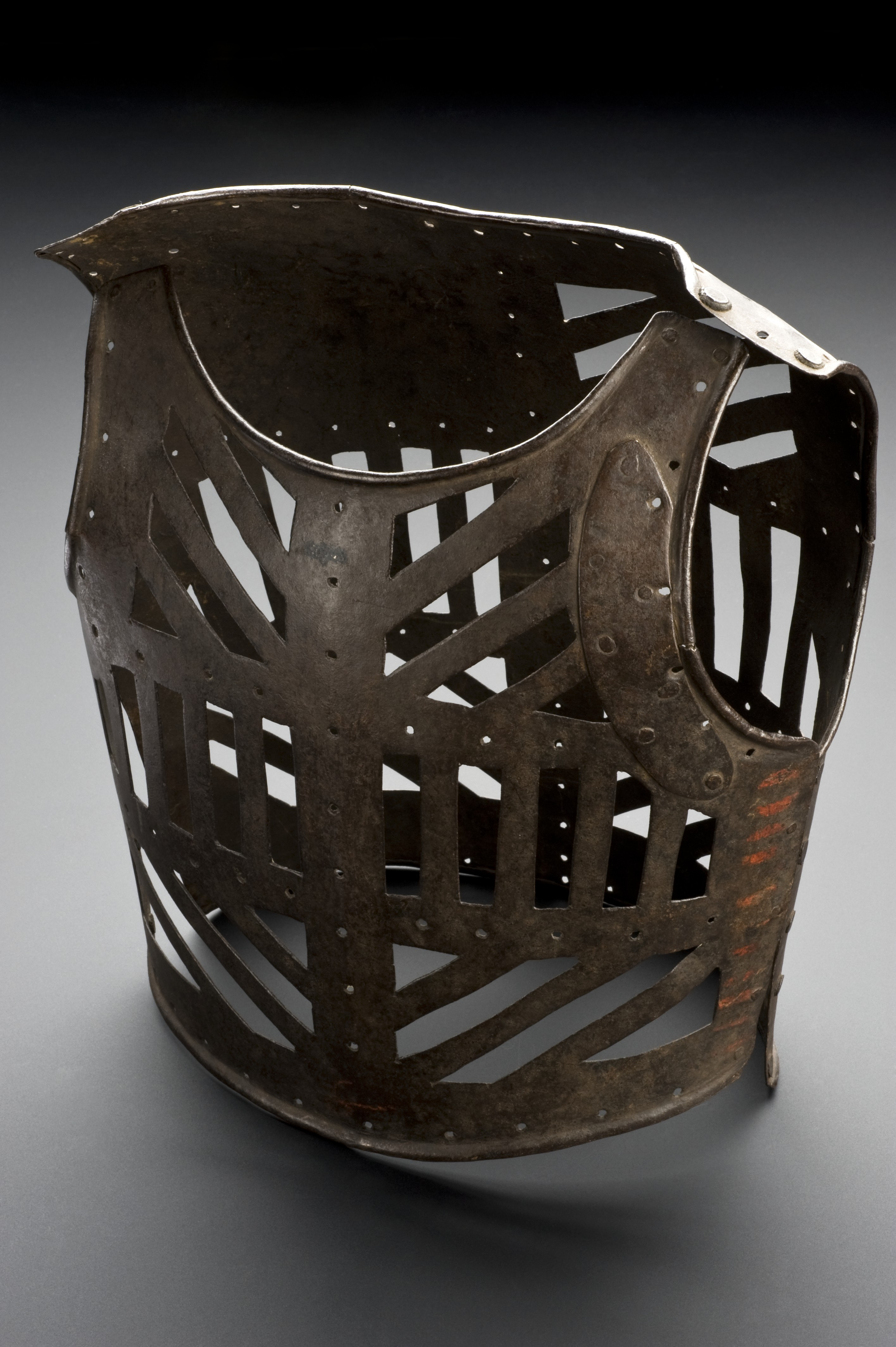
Orthopaedic iron corset for a child. Europe, 1801–1880.

In Fashion and Fetishism, David Kunzle noted that in Peter Rondeau's 1739 French-German dictionary, the French term corps de fer is explained in German as Schnürburst, mit kleinen eisernen blechen, für übel gewachsenes Frauenzimmer ("A bodice, with small iron plates, for badly grown [i.e., deformed] girls"). He reads this as implying that the iron plates would have been part of a fabric corset, rather than an all-metal garment.

Kunzle has noted the absence of literary evidence for showing that metal corsets were also worn for fashion purposes. He has suggested that surviving metal garments, if not specifically medical in purpose, might have served the same masochistically-gratifying purpose as the deliberately uncomfortable, torturous hair shirt, combining a fashionable silhouette with penance, and as such, might have been worn in convents. To support his "pure speculation", Kunzle cites an 1871 newspaper report from The Times reporting that during the Paris Commune, the National Guard found two iron corsets, a rack, and other instruments in the Convent of the White Nuns in Picpus. The claim by the Mother Superior that the instruments were for orthopaedic purposes was dismissed at the time as "a superficial falsehood."

Metal corsets for medical purposes continued to be used in the 18th and early 19th century, although equivalent garments made from canvas were increasingly used in their place. In 1894, A.M. Phelps of the American Orthopaedic Association recommended an aluminium corset coated with waterproof enamel for sufferers of Pott disease or curvature of the spine. Made from a cast of the patient's body, the advantages of such a garment were that aluminium was lightweight, durable, thin enough to be worn beneath clothing, and could be worn while bathing. Such corsets were still being recommended in the early 20th century as cheaper and more durable in the longer run than plaster moulds, although their initial expense was greater.

== 20th and 21st centuries ==
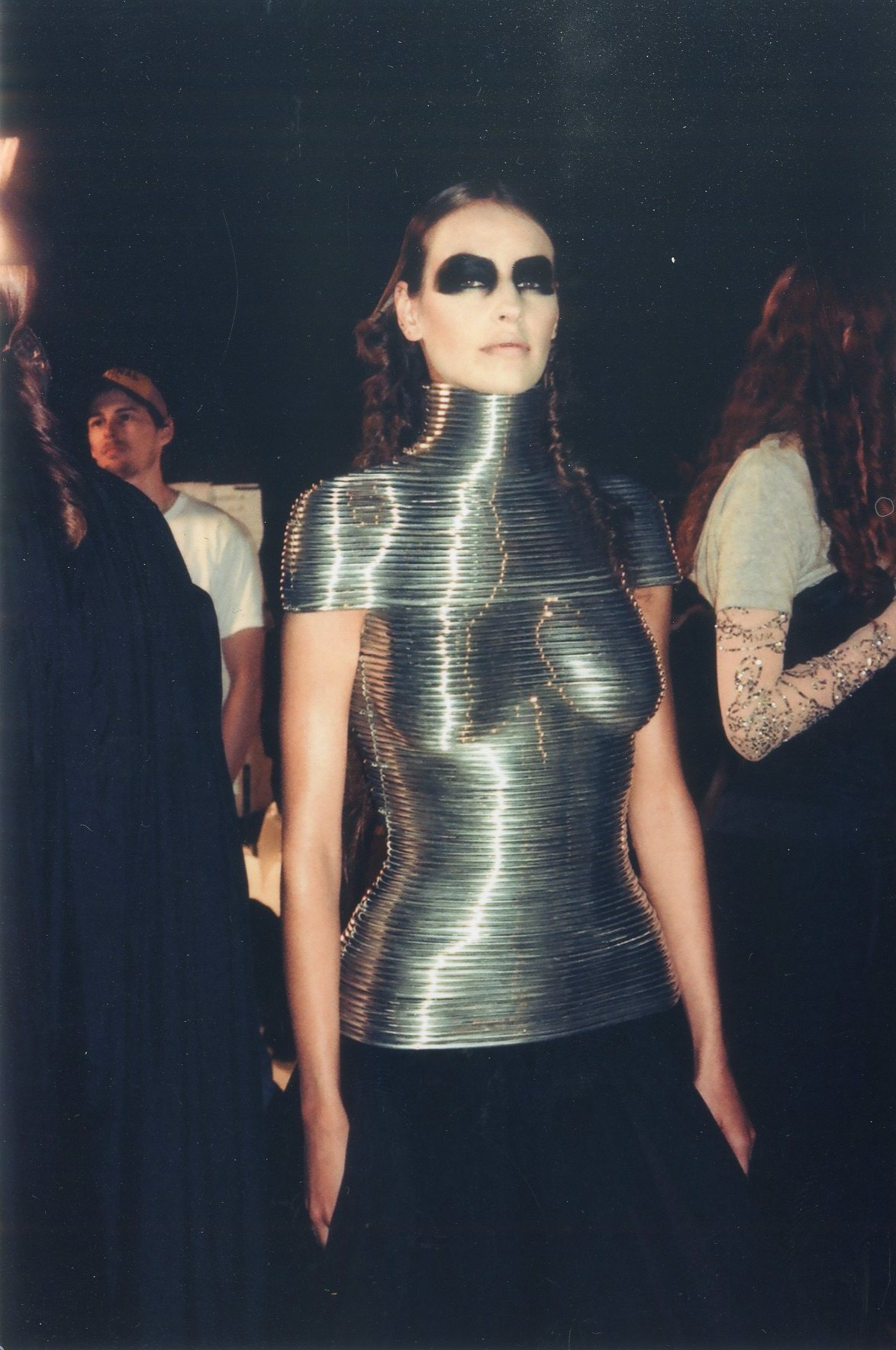
The Coiled Corset, Shaun Leane for Alexander McQueen, 1999.

Since the 20th century, metal corsets designed as fashionable garments have occasionally been made for contemporary wear, although such instances are rare. Steele notes that alongside a 1930s metal corset made for and worn by a fetish corsetiere called Cayne, the late 20th- and early 21st-century tight-lacer Cathie Jung had a silver corset-cover made to wear over her actual laced corset. Between 1933 and 1940 Mrs. Cayne advertised a booklet describing her 14 in (360 mm) waistline and offered other services in the Illustrated Sporting and Dramatic News.

As a medical garment, metal corsets endured well into the 20th century. The Mexican painter Frida Kahlo was a notable wearer of such medical corsets, following ongoing problems as a result of a serious road crash she experienced as a teenager. By 1944, Kahlo's doctors had recommended that she wear a steel corset instead of the plaster ones she had mainly worn since the accident; and Kahlo, whose paintings were heavily autobiographical, used the new corset as the basis for one of her best known self-portraits, The Broken Column. In the painting, Kahlo portrays herself weeping with agony, her torso split open revealing that her spine is a crumbling Ionic column, and her damaged body held together by the steel corset. A form of metal corset or orthopaedic brace used in the second half of the 20th century was the Harris brace, named after its inventor, R.I. Harris. Harris braces are designed to immobilise the waist whilst healing, and are made with two bendable metal bands worn above and below the waist, connected with rigid metal supports.

20th and 21st century designers have sometimes designed metal corsets and bodices as part of their fashion shows, including Alexander McQueen, Issey Miyake, and Thierry Mugler. One of McQueen's most famous pieces was a 1999 aluminium corset, called the Coiled Corset, created in collaboration with the jeweller Shaun Leane and the artist Kees van der Graaf. Built around a cast of the model Laura Morgan's torso, the garment had a 15 in (380 mm) waist and was composed of 97 stacked coils, which had to be screwed together onto Morgan's body. The Coiled Corset was inspired by the neck rings worn by Ndebele women, extended to encase the wearer's torso. In 2001, the corset formed part of a live presentation at the Victoria and Albert Museum showcasing McQueen and Leane's collaborations. Corsets and bustiers can also be made using wire, such as a 1983 aluminium wire bustier by Miyake, which was cuffed around the torso over a feathered garment, offering a pun on the theme of birdcages.

== In museums ==
Metal corsets are found in a number of museum collections around the world. Some museums, including the Museo Stibbert, and the Kyoto Costume Institute in Japan, present their metal bodices as fashionable late 16th-century garments. The Victoria and Albert Museum in London describes an iron corset in their collection (formerly owned by the painter Talbot Hughes) as dating from the 18th century and likely intended for orthopaedic purposes. Others, such as the iron corset in the Fashion Institute of Technology, are presented as fakes.
