= All That Glitters: Britain's Next Jewellery Star =

- Genre: Reality; Game show
- Presented by: Katherine Ryan
- Judges: Shaun Leane; Solange Azagury-Partridge; Dinny Hall
- Country of origin: United Kingdom
- Original language: English
- No. of series: 2
- No. of episodes: 12

Production
- Executive producer: Amanda Westwood
- Producer: Denise Mather
- Production location: Birmingham School of Jewellery
- Running time: 30 minutes
- Production company: Twenty Twenty Television

Original release
- Network: BBC Two
- Release: 13 April 2021 – 29 September 2022

Related
- The Great British Bake Off; The Great Pottery Throw Down; The Great British Sewing Bee

All That Glitters: Britain's Next Jewellery Star is a BBC reality show that began airing on BBC Two on 13 April 2021. In the show, jewellers compete to be named "Britain's Next Jewellery Star". A spin-off of the format of The Great British Bake Off, the programme is presented by Katherine Ryan, with judges Shaun Leane and Solange Azagury-Partridge (series 1) and Dinny Hall (series 2). The second series began airing on BBC Two in August 2022. It was confirmed on 7 April 2023, that a third series would not be commissioned and the show was axed by the BBC.

== Series format ==
The show format is similar to The Great British Bake Off in that each episode features challenges which to be completed within a certain time period. The series starts with eight jewellers, with one being eliminated each episode. In the Best Seller challenge, the judges ask the jewellers to create specific jewellery, meeting certain criteria, with a view towards marketability. In the Bespoke Brief, the jewellers are given a request from a member of the public to design and create a specific item, with that person then making a selection from the various items made.

== Series overview ==
Series	Episodes	Originally released		Winner
Series	Episodes	First released	Last released	Winner
1	6	13 April 2021	18 May 2021	Hugo Johnson
2	6	25 August 2022	29 September 2022	Piers Carpenter

=== Series 1 (2021) ===
The first series of All That Glitters: Britain's Next Jewellery Star started on 13 April 2021 and aired for six episodes, concluding on 18 May. The series was hosted by Katherine Ryan and the judges were Shaun Leane and Solange Azagury-Partridge. The final was won by Hugo Johnson, with Dan Musselwhite and Tamara Gomez as runners up.

=== Series 2 (2022) ===
A second series of All That Glitters: Britain's Next Jewellery Star began airing on 25 August 2022 on BBC Two. The third episode was delayed by five days to accommodate news coverage of the death of Queen Elizabeth II. The series was again hosted by Katherine Ryan, Shaun Leane returned as judge, alongside new judge Dinny Hall, who replaced Solange Azagury-Partridge. The final was won by Piers Carpenter, with Emma White and Jack Mitchell as runners up.

== International broadcasts ==
=== Broadcast ===
- New Zealand - broadcast since 2022 on Eden

== See also ==
- Handmade: Britain's Best Woodworker
- The Great British Bake Off
- The Great British Sewing Bee
- The Great Pottery Throw Down
