= Shaun Leane (jeweller) =

British jewellery designer

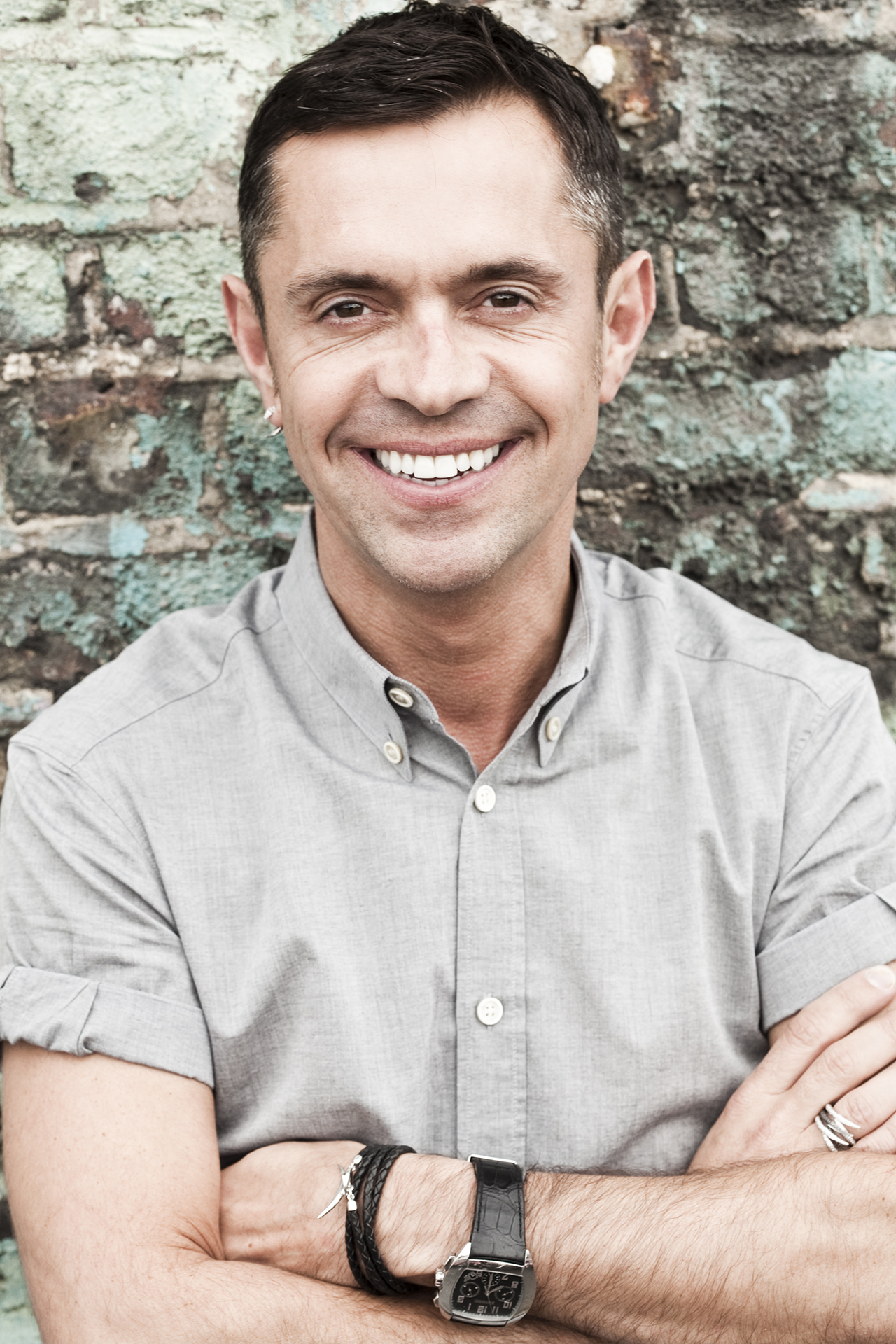
- Born: 1969 (age 56–57); London, England
- Occupation: Jewellery designer
- Years active: 1992–present
- Website: 12creations.com

Shaun Leane (born 8 July 1969) is a British jewellery designer best known for his sculptural pieces created for Alexander McQueen. His eponymous jewellery brand is a four-time winner of the UK Jewellery Designer of the Year award.

== Early life and education ==
Leane was born and raised in Finsbury Park, London, the only child to an Irish father and an English mother.

Leane attended St. Aidan's Primary School in Finsbury Park, and then St Thomas More RC. Leane left school aged 14 to work for his father's construction firm. At 15, a chance meeting with a career advisor preceded Leane enrolling in a youth training scheme for jewellery design at Kingsway Princeton College of Further Education in Clerkenwell.

Leane started a seven-year apprenticeship with English Traditional Jewellery in Hatton Garden, where he became a classically trained goldsmith. He undertook antique restorations of Victorian, Art Nouveau and Art Deco jewellery.

== Career ==
Leane was mentored by Brian Joslin and Richard Bullock and learnt the disciplines of the craft, transitioning from copper to gold in six months. Goldsmithing skills Leane learnt during his apprenticeship included making intricate, composite fastenings; complex setting techniques; and restoration of period pieces with attention to detail and focus on preserving their beauty from the back as well as front. Leane also repaired and restored antique jewels for dealers at Grays Antiques in Mayfair, Bermondsey Square Market.

At 18 years old, Leane was making diamond tiaras for Mappin & Webb, Garrard and Asprey. His clients included the British royal family.

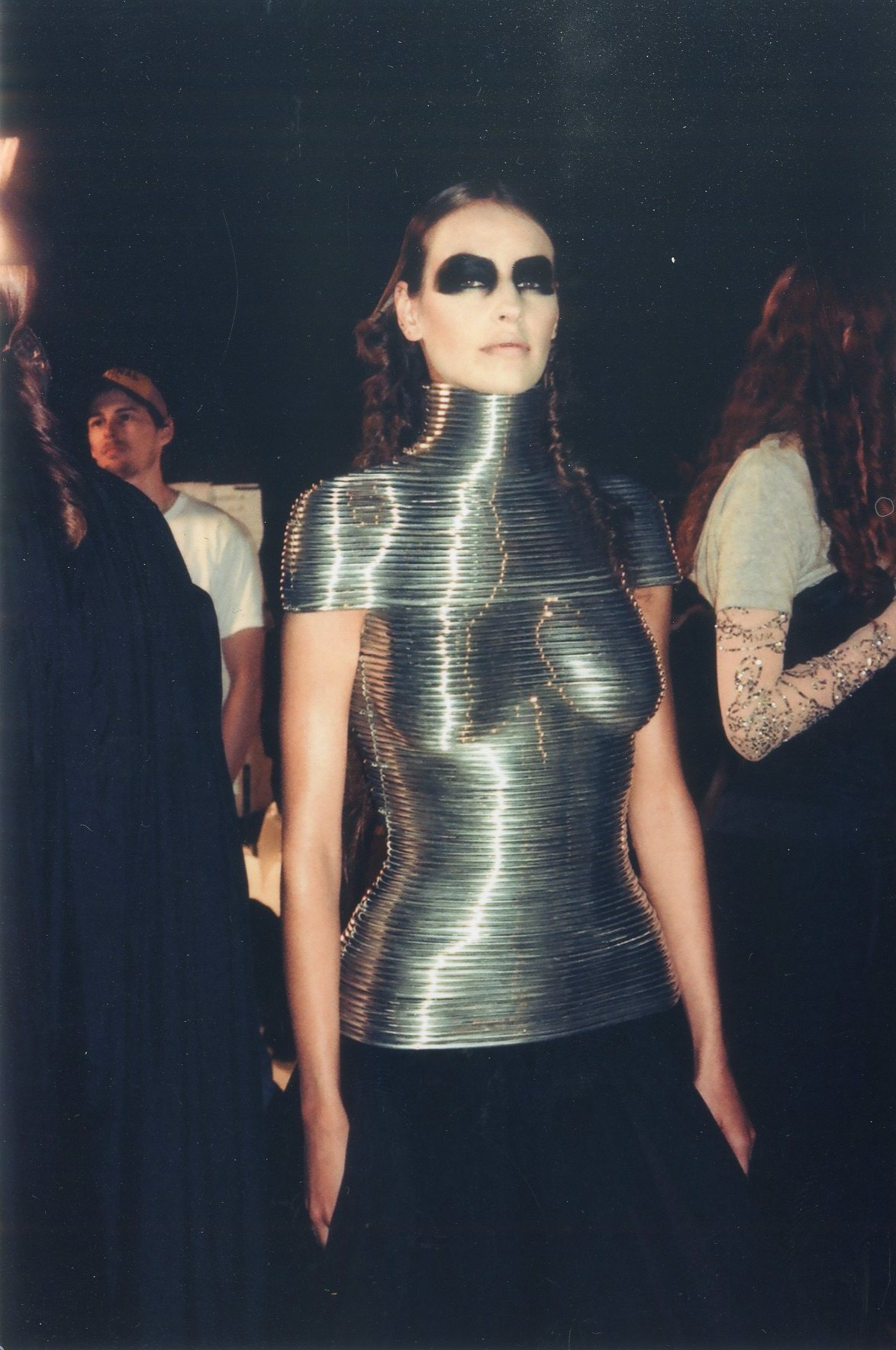
Coiled Corset, created for Alexander McQueen's The Overlook Autumn/Winter 1999

In 1992, a friend introduced Leane to Alexander McQueen, who was then studying at Central Saint Martins College of Art and Design. The next year, McQueen asked Leane to create Victorian-style silver fob watch chains for his show, Highland Rape. Leane taught himself new techniques to create the large finale pieces for McQueen's shows.

Leane was soon working on eight shows a year for McQueen and Givenchy. His designs for McQueen went from small jewels in the early shows to larger and more avant-garde designs such as a spine skeleton corset for the Spring/Summer 1998 show Untitled. His 1996 mouthpiece, titled Repression, was originally created for the 1997 McQueen Autumn-Winter collection, and chosen by Isabella Blow as part of a group of garments selected to represent fashions of 1997 in the Fashion Museum, Bath's Dress of the Year collection.

Leane worked with McQueen on a neckpiece, inspired by the neckpieces worn by the Ndebele women of South Africa, for McQueen's "It's a Jungle out There" collection in 1997. It was worn by Björk on the cover of her 1997 album Homogenic. McQueen asked Leane if he could create a similar piece to fit the entire torso, and for McQueen's Autumn/Winter 1999 catwalk show, The Overlook, Leane created the Coiled Corset, a form-encasing bodice created from coils of aluminum. Artist Kees van der Graaf created a concrete cast of the body of model Laura Morgan, around which Leane created a metal corset. Leane has called the piece his highlight in working with McQueen, and his most challenging project. He spent 16 hours a day for 10 weeks creating it.

For the Spring/Summer 2000 show, Eye, Leane created a yashmak made from chainmail. For the 2001 Autumn/Winter show What a Merry Go Round, Leane taught himself taxidermy to create earrings of pheasant claws clutching Tahitian pearls. Later, Leane created star and moon headdresses for the Autumn/Winter 2007 show, In Memory of Elizabeth Howe, Salem, 1692, inspired by antique vintage Victorian brooches but designed to be worn as headdresses. Leane and McQueen worked together until McQueen's death in 2010. Leane gave an address at the memorial service for McQueen on 20 September 2010. A selection of over 30 pieces Leane created with McQueen were featured in the Alexander McQueen: Savage Beauty exhibition at the Metropolitan Museum of Art in New York in 2011, later restaged at the Victoria and Albert Museum in London in 2015.

=== Shaun Leane Jewellery ===
In 1998, a buyer for Harvey Nichols approached Leane with a view to stocking his first collection. This led to Leane putting together his first commercial collections, which used elements from his work for McQueen. In 1999, Leane founded Shaun Leane Jewellery, a company producing jewellery collections alongside his large-scale fashion pieces, combining traditional craftsmanship with modern design and computer-aided design techniques. Sotheby's described his jewellery as "antiques of the future." Leane's designs are sold online and at retailers in Britain, Europe, the Middle East and the United States.

Jewellery designer Ben Rowe joined Shaun Leane in 1999. He became a director in 2007 and was officially named Creative Director in 2011. He left in December 2016.

Shaun Leane Jewellery has been acquired for the permanent collections of the Metropolitan Museum of Art in New York and the Victoria and Albert Museum in London. His jewellery has been worn by Björk, Daphne Guinness, Sam Taylor-Johnson, Elton John, Emma Watson, Kate Moss, Sarah Jessica Parker and the Hassanal Bolkiah.

On 28 May 2024, the jewellery brand entered administration, with Begbies Traynor appointed to oversee the process.

=== Collaborations and commissions ===
Leane collaborated with Boucheron on a necklace for the label's 150th anniversary in 2008. The 'Queen of The Night' necklace has delicate, blackened gold flowers set with white and brown diamonds and sapphires, which can open and close with hidden buttons. It was unveiled at a party at the Boucheron store in Mayfair, London.

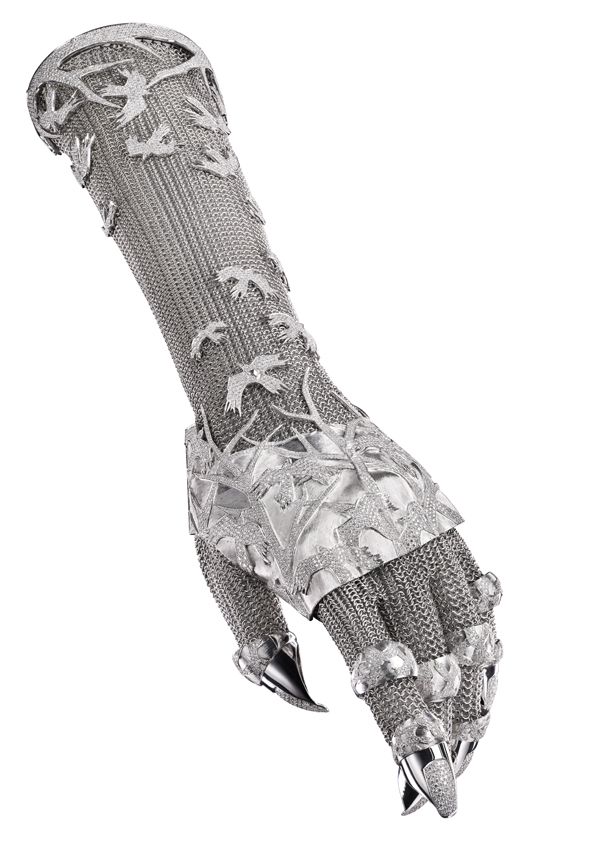
Contra Mundum, 2011

Leane was commissioned by Daphne Guinness to create the Contra Mundum, also known as The Diamond Glove, a hand-crafted evening glove crafted from 1,000 grams of 18-carat white gold and set with 5,000 pave white diamonds. The Glove was presented by Jay Jopling in its debut at a private party in London in 2011. It took Leane five years to create.

In 2011, Leane began working with jewellery house Asprey on three new collections, released in May 2012: The Woodland Collection, a series of nature-inspired fine charm jewellery, and The Fern Collection, a series of emerald, diamond and platinum rings, earrings and necklaces inspired by ferns and the Storm Collection, featuring a vortex of diamonds on delicate gold wire. A charms necklace from the Woodland Collection was worn by Kate Middleton.

In 2014, SHOWstudio presented SHOWcabinet, the first major exhibition of Leane's work. It was held in gallery space owned by photographer Nick Knight. Leane worked with Austrian cut lead glass producer Swarovski to create the 2015 nine-piece jewellery collection Swift.

In 2016, Leane was commissioned by Grainger Plc in collaboration with Futurecity to design the balcony railings and gates across the façade of 21 Young Street - a London residential development in Kensington, designed by Assael Architecture. This was Leane's debut into the architectural realm and one of the largest scale commissions in the UK by a jewellery designer. Unveiled in July 2018, Arbour consists of 36 balcony railings and two gates cast in phosphor bronze by British metalwork foundry Chris Brammall. Featuring 1,850 bronze sculpted leaves and three-dimensional branches, the entire piece weighs over four tonnes. The building's façade is inspired by neighbouring Kensington Square and the greenery of the private garden. A replicate of the balcony is on permanent display in the metalwork gallery at the V&A Museum.

On 4 December 2017, Leane's personal archive of couture jewellery was offered for auction by Sotheby's New York in conjunction with Kerry Taylor Auctions. Several of the pieces had appeared in The Metropolitan Museum of Art and the Victoria & Albert in their retrospectives of Leane's work. Notable pieces from the sale included the Skeleton Corset designed by Leane for McQueen's Untitled collection, Spring-Summer 1998 and the Coiled Corset from The Overlook collection, Autumn-Winter 1999–2000. The Coiled Corset, the only piece signed by both Leane and McQueen, was sold for $807,000, while the Skeleton Corset was sold for $711,000 in the auction.

=== British royal family ===
Leane's jewels have been worn by Kate Middleton, Duchess of Cambridge and Meghan Markle, Duchess of Sussex. In 2019, Princess Beatrice and her fiancé Edoardo Mapelli Mozzi broke with royal tradition when they announced their engagement by naming Leane as the designer of the ring, a detail that Buckingham Palace does not usually reveal.

=== Monograph ===
In 2020, Leane published a monograph in collaboration with AAC Art Books. The book is a retrospective that provides an insight into Leane's collaboration with McQueen through a collection of backstage photography by Ann Ray. Other contributions include editorial photographs by Nick Knight, catwalk and backstage images, documented by fashion photographers Robert Fairer and Chris Moore. Also included are essays examining Leane's heritage and craft; collaborations with McQueen; and his modern jewellery designs. Jeffrey Felner of the New York Journal of Books wrote, "Shaun Leane is a definitive example of the genre on every level. It dazzles, it provokes, it astounds, and it teaches you what can happen when you push yourself to perfection and beyond no matter what is asked of you or what you believe is expected of you."

== Television ==
In 2013, Leane filmed BBC documentary Secret Knowledge: The Cheapside Hoard for BBC Four. The programme coincided with the exhibition of the Cheapside Hoard jewels at the Museum of London. Leane's filming took place in the City of London and at the Museum of London, where Leane was granted an exclusive look at the jewels of the Cheapside Hoard. Leane was chosen by the BBC for his expertise on the long-gone 'Diamond District' of Elizabethan London.

Since 2021, Leane has been a judge on BBC television series All That Glitters: Britain's Next Jewellery Star. Hosted by comedian Katherine Ryan, the BBC Two show follows the format of The Great British Bake Off "but with lots of glitter". Series 1 and 2 were filmed over six episodes for each, in Birmingham's Jewellery Quarter. Eight competing jewellers face a set of themed challenges under time pressure in each episode.

In 2021, Leane took part in filming docu-series Art that Made Us, an eight-part programme for BBC Two, made as part of a series to celebrate the centenary of the BBC. Leane was selected by the BBC for his knowledge of the Penicuik Jewels in episode three, Queens, Feuds and Faith, which documents how the religious revolution of the 16th century created radical and surprising works of art. Filming took place at the National Museum of Scotland in Edinburgh, where Leane was invited to examine the craftsmanship of the Penicuik Jewels.

== Selected exhibitions ==
- Extreme Beauty: The Body Transformed, Metropolitan Museum of Art, New York, 2001–02
- AngloMania: Tradition and Transgression in British Fashion, Metropolitan Museum of Art, New York, 2006
- Alexander McQueen: Savage Beauty, Metropolitan Museum of Art, New York, 2011
- SHOWcabinet, SHOWstudio, 2014
- Alexander McQueen: Savage Beauty, Victoria and Albert Museum, London, 2015
- Heavenly Bodies, Metropolitan Museum of Art, New York, 2018
- Jewelry: The Body Transformed, Metropolitan Museum of Art, New York, 2018–19

== Honours and awards ==
- UK Jewellery Awards, Jewellery Designer of the Year, 2004, 2005, 2009, 2010
- Britain's Luxury Jewellery Designer of the Year, 2006
- Luxury and Creation Talent Awards, Talent de la Séduction, 2010
- Harper's Bazaar Jewelry China's International Designer of the Year, 2013
- Walpole British Luxury, Best Luxury Craftsmanship, 2013
- Andrea Palladio International Jewellery Award for Best International Jewellery Designer, 2015
- UK Jewellery Awards, Fine Jewellery Brand of the Year, 2016
- UK Jewellery Awards Outstanding Contribution to Industry 2021

== Personal life ==
Leane lives in London, England. In February 2006, he was made a Freeman of the City of London, which is the highest honour in the city.
