= Shearling =

Sheepskin or lambskin pelt that has gone through a limited shearing process

Shearling is a skin from a recently shorn sheep or lamb that has been tanned and dressed with the wool left on. It has a suede surface on one side and a clipped fur surface on the other. The suede side is usually worn outward. Real shearling breathes and is more flexible, much heavier and the fur is much denser than synthetic. Synthetic shearling fur is typically called sherpa. Synthetic or fake shearling has a bit of a sheen to its outer side, while real shearling outer hide is dull and a bit tacky to the touch. Genuine shearling is also smoother to the touch than synthetic shearling.

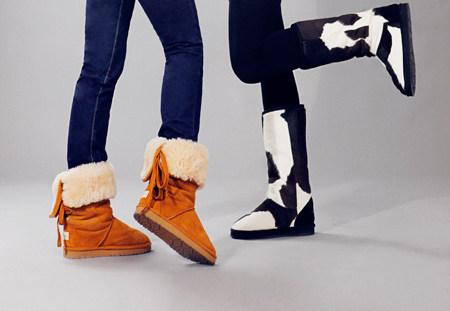
Modern shearling boots

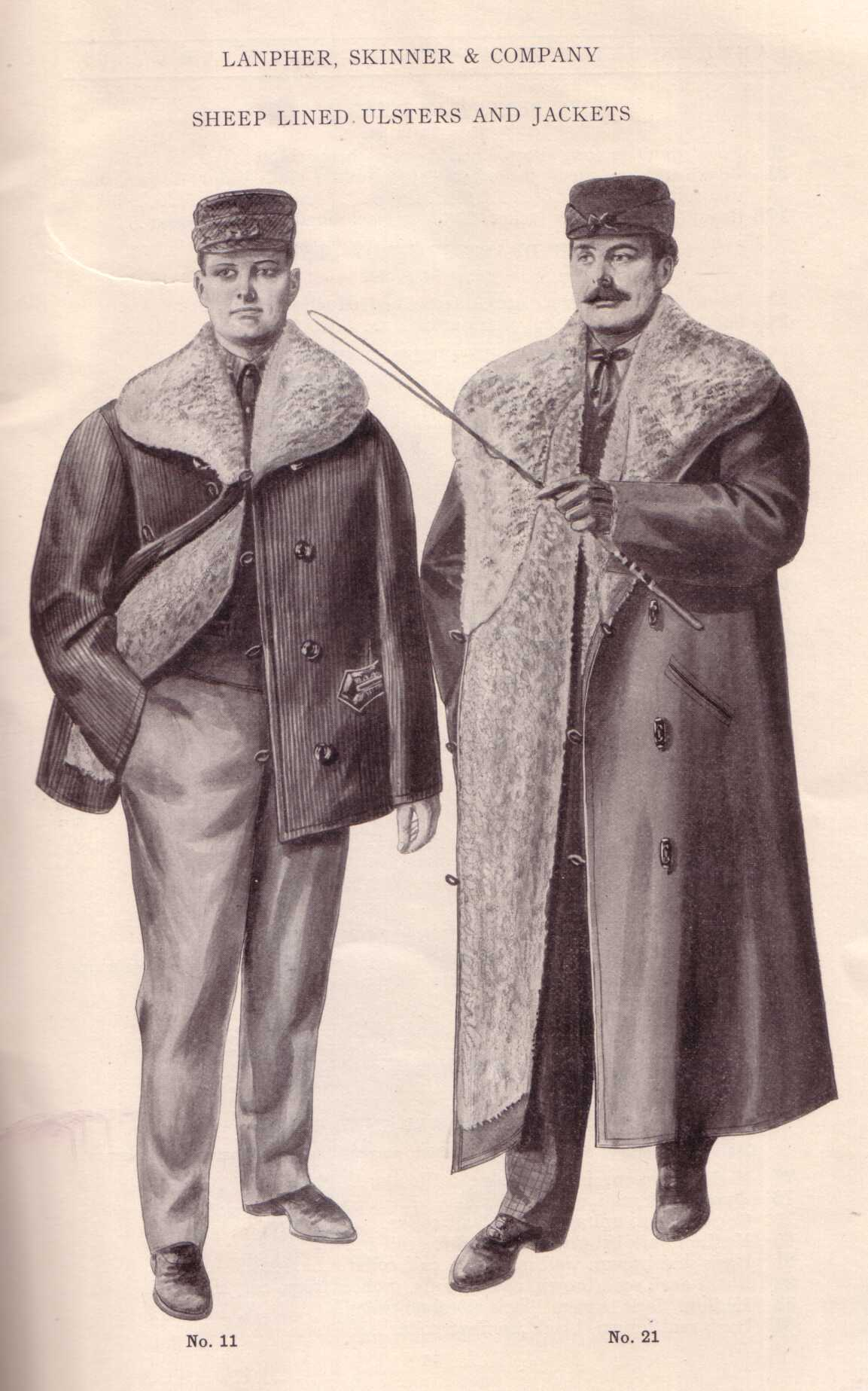
Shearling coats in a 1905 catalogue
