= Jacques Azagury =

Moroccan-born fashion designer

- Born: Morocco
- Education: London College of Fashion; St Martin's School of Art
- Occupation: Fashion designer

Jacques Azagury is a British fashion designer.

== Life and career ==
Azagury was born in Morocco. He studied at the London College of Fashion and St Martin's School of Art, before opening his flagship store in London's Knightsbridge in 1987.

Azagury has created clothes for Princess Diana, Helen Mirren and Elizabeth McGovern. Azagury would visit Diana for dress fittings at her apartment in Kensington Palace.

In December 2023, a black velvet and royal-blue organza dress that Azagury designed for Diana in 1985 sold at auction for close to $1.15 million (the highest amount for any of Diana's dresses sold at auction up to that date, and eleven times what the auction house, Julien's Auctions, had predicted the dress would sell for).
