= Talbot Hughes =

English painter

- Born: Talbot Hughes; 1869
- Died: 1942 (aged 72–73)
- Known for: Painting, Collector, writer
- Movement: Genre, landscape, Romantic

Talbot Hughes (1869–1942) was a British painter (of genre, history and landscape), a collector of historical costumes and miniature portraits, and a writer on fine art and costume design. He exhibited at the Royal Academy from the age of 17 until 1913.

== Biography ==
Talbot Hughes was the son of still-life painter William Hughes, and brother of Sir Herbert Hughes-Stanton, a landscape painter.

He lived in London, and later in Osmington, near Weymouth, Dorset. From 1871 to 1913 he exhibited at the Royal Academy. He also exhibited with the Society of British Artists. In 1894 he was elected to the Arts Club. In 1903 he was elected to the Society of Oil Painters.

== His painting ==
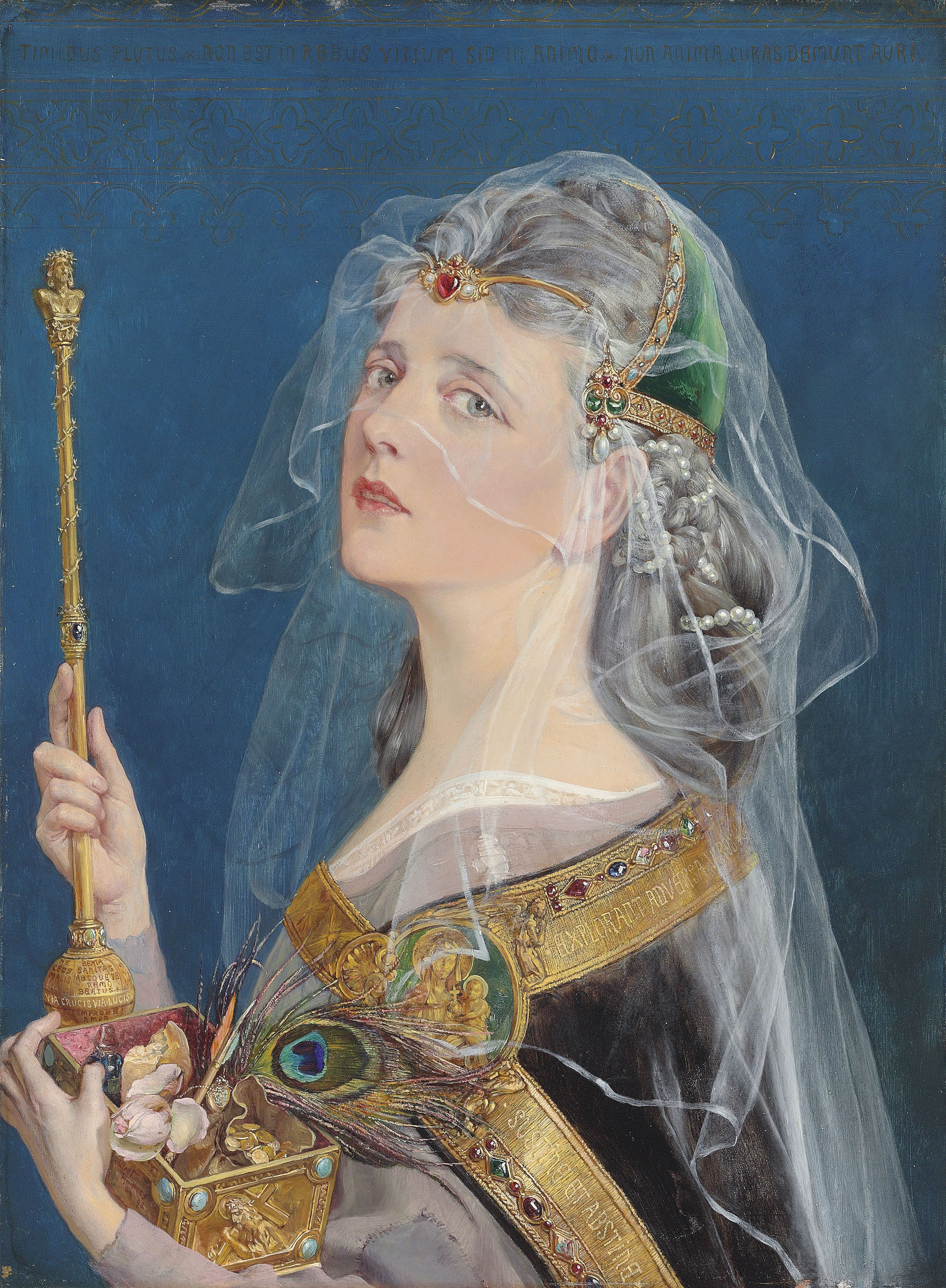
Care, by Talbot Hughes, 1898

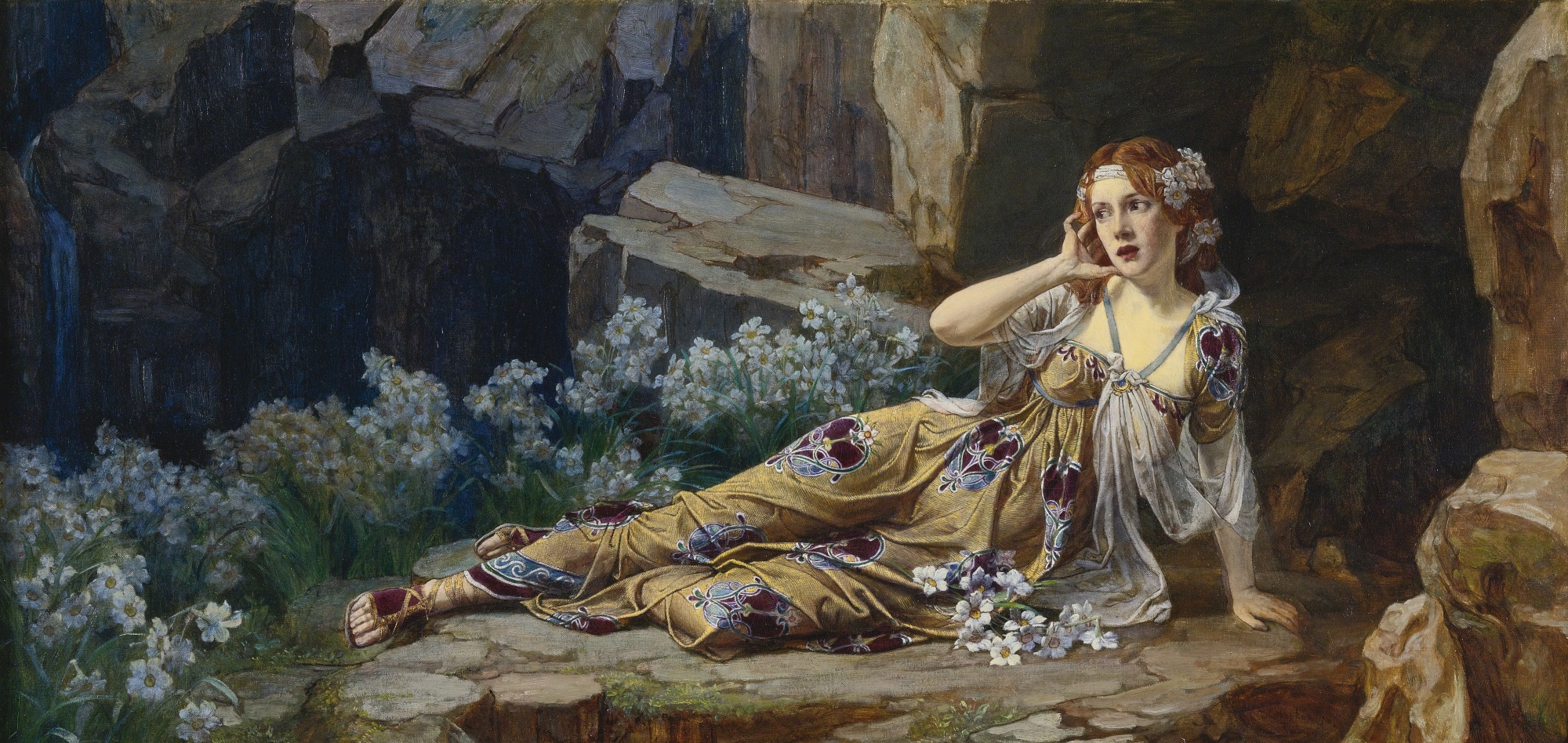
Echo by Talbot Hughes, 1900

His painterly subjects ranged from the allegorical, figurative, and historical to the theatrical. He admired the style of Jean-Louis-Ernest Meissonier, the French classicist painter. Hughes was preoccupied with the refinement of the presentation of his subject, the depiction of idealized feminine beauty and the tribulations of romantic love. In a 1902 article in The Magazine of Art writer Marion Hepworth Dixon commented on Hughes's "dexterity of hand, the extraordinary facility with which he renders the different surfaces of stuffs, woods, and metal, together with the agility of his outlook and the verve and spontaneity of his eighteenth century designs." Hughes's submissions to the Royal Academy included works carrying such titles as "Temptation" (1899), "Fate leads the willing, and the unwilling drags" (1900) and "The Road of Love" (1900).

== His collections ==
Talbot Hughes amassed a collection of over 750 historical costumes and accessories, dating from c.1450 to the 1870s, which he used as studio props. In 1910 he sold a small collection of bags to the Victoria and Albert Museum and also donated individual items, including an 1820s frock coat. In 1913, when Hughes decided to put the rest of his collection up for sale, he was offered £5,000 by an American department store who wished to donate it to the Metropolitan Museum of Art. Rather than send his collection abroad, Hughes instead sold it for £2,500 to the department store Harrods in London, where it was displayed for three weeks to advertise the store's own range of women's contemporary fashions. After this period, Harrods transferred the collection by donation to the Victoria & Albert Museum, the result of negotiations by the then Director of the V&A, Cecil Harcourt Smith. The collection is still kept at the V&A. Talbot Hughes continued to donate individual items to the Museum until 1931.

Also in 1913, Hughes published his book Dress Design: an account of costume for artists and dress makers, illustrated by the author from old examples.

In 1928 the dealer Philip Rosenbach bought Hughes’s collection of 450 miniature portraits. In 1988 the Rosenbach Museum & Library in Philadelphia, USA, mounted an exhibition of 30 of his Spanish portrait miniatures.

== Paintings and Illustrations: External links ==
- The Story of the Hare That Got Away 1898
- The Path of True Love Never Did Run Smooth
- Sewing for Victory 1900
- The Merry Widow, Illustration 1905
- The Merry Widow, 2 illustrations at the Wine Museum

== Bibliography ==
- Taylor, Lou. Establishing dress history (Manchester University Press, 2004).
- C. Kains-Jackson, Catalogue of a collection of cabinet pictures by Talbot Hughes (1901 Fine Art Society)
