= Boucheron =

French luxury jewelry and watch house

- Type: Subsidiary
- Industry: Luxury goods
- Founded: 1858; 168 years ago
- Founder: Frédéric Boucheron
- Headquarters: Paris, France
- Key people: Hélène Poulit-Duquesne (CEO); Claire Choisne (creative director)
- Products: Jewelry, perfume, watches
- Parent: Kering
- Website: www.boucheron.com

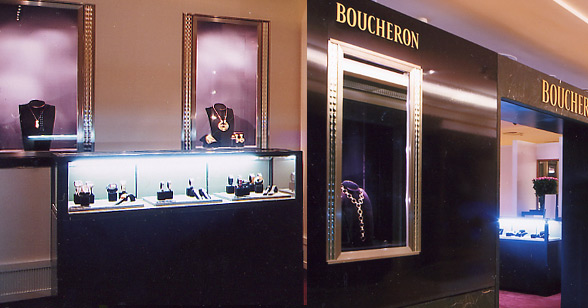
A typical Boucheron boutique

Boucheron (pronounced [bu.ʃə.ʁɔ̃]) is a French luxury jewelry and watch house located in Paris, 26 Place Vendôme, owned by Kering. Hélène Poulit-Duquesne has been CEO since 2015 and Claire Choisne creative director since 2011.

== History ==
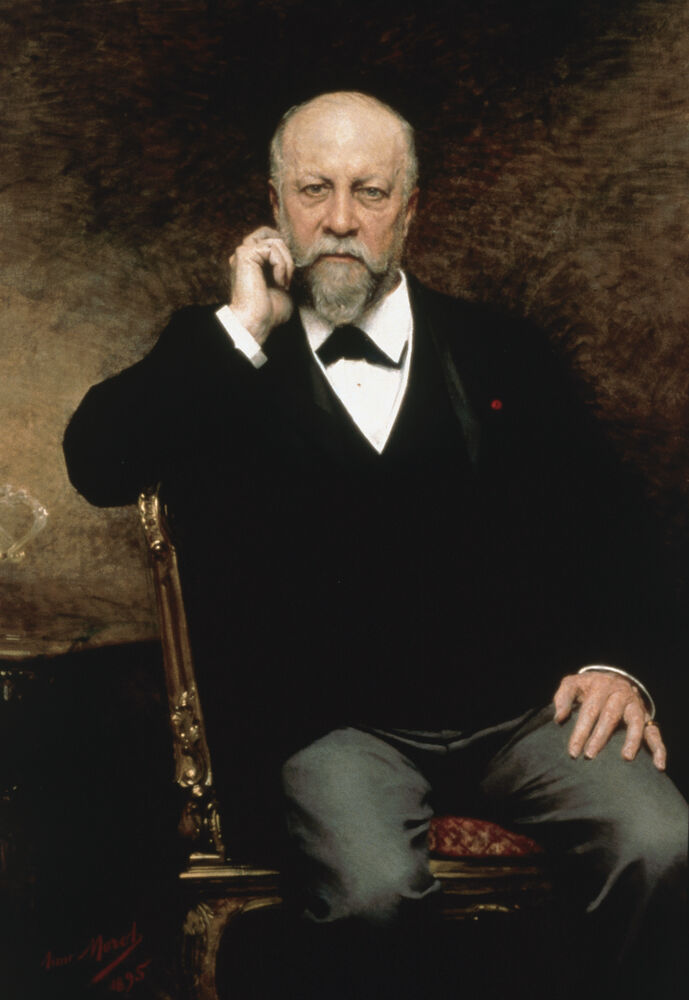
Frédéric Boucheron

=== At the origins ===
The House of Boucheron is a French family dynasty founded by Frédéric Boucheron in 1858, with the opening of his first store in the Galerie de Valois, at Palais-Royal, during the heyday of the Second French Empire. He created his atelier in 1866 and a year later won the Gold Medal during the Exposition Universelle (1867).

Paul Legrand (1840-1910) worked as the chief designer for the house of Boucheron from 1863-1867, and again 1871-1892. He is credited with the idea of combining pearls with diamond rondelles, first seen in Boucheron products in 1889. The "rondelle" cut of diamonds was pioneered by Bordinckx, who was also associated with Boucheron. While Legrand was head designer, in 1879, Boucheron developed a clasp-less necklace, which was part of its show which won a Grand Prix for Outstanding Innovation in a Jewellery Collection at the 1889 World's Fair. Legrand was also influential in the design of the "Plume de Paon" (Peacock's Feather) design, which has been featured in Boucheron collections since Legrand and Frédéric Boucheron created it in 1866. It featured in the Point d'Interrogation necklace, which was bought by Grand Duke Alexei Alexandrovich Romanov. This necklace was also featured in the World's Fair-winning collection.

In 1893, Frédéric Boucheron became the first jeweler to move to Place Vendôme. Legend has it that he chose 26 Place Vendôme, where Boucheron remains to this day, because it was the sunniest corner of the square. He believed that the diamonds in the windows would sparkle all the more brilliantly.

In 1893, Boucheron opened a store in Moscow, later transferred to St Petersburg in 1911; in 1903 a store in London and an office in New York. More store openings followed in Japan in 1973, Shanghai, Dubai in 2005, and finally Hong Kong and Kuala Lumpur in 2006.

During the Art Nouveau period, Boucheron also became known for sculpted designs, often combining chased, enameled gold set with gems and pâte-de-verre. One such example, a gold belt buckle featuring two lionesses biting into a carnelian above a green pâte-de-verre lion's head, demonstrates the brand's intricate, nature-inspired motifs.

=== The royal years ===
In 1878, the Russian Prince Felix Youssoupoff purchased a corsage decorated with 6 detachable diamond bows during one of his visits to Paris.

In 1921, Boucheron was commissioned to make a tiara for Lady Greville which was later given to Queen Elizabeth The Queen Mother. Her grandson Prince Charles passed the tiara on to his wife Camilla, Duchess of Cornwall.

Queen Elizabeth II also had a collection of Boucheron jewels.

In 1928, the Maharaja of Patiala asked Boucheron to set the stones of his treasure, which were brought to the Place Vendôme boutique by the prince. Other royal patrons of Boucheron have included Maharajah Sir Bhupinder Singh of Patiala, Riza Shah Pahlevi, Queen Farida of Egypt and Queen Rania of Jordan.

=== Collections ===
One of the first lines created was the symbolic snake line in the 1970s.

Solange Azagury-Partridge was appointed Creative Director in 2001, she held the position for three years. 2002 saw the launch of the "Beauté Dangereuse" and "Cinna Pampilles" collections, "Not Bourgeois" launched the following year.

In 2004, the "Jaipur" High Jewellery line and the "Déchaînée" collection were launched.

2005 was a notable year for House of Boucheron: the "Trouble," "Quatre," "Diablotine," "Vingt-Six" and "Trouble Désir" jewelry lines are launched.

In 2006 "Exquises Confidences" was launched, and a year later "Fleurs Fatales" high jewelry collection made its debut.

In 2010, Boucheron unveiled a colorful jewelry range to enhance its "Cinna Pampilles" collection.

In 2011, the "Cabinet of Curiosities" line was launched.

=== Collaborations ===
In 1996 Boucheron collaborated with Waterman Paris to produce the limited edition, Edson signe Boucheron. The nib was made of 18K solid gold with the body of the pen being of a blue translucent Resin. The retail price was €2000 / $2700 / £1700 and limited to only 3471 pieces (this number is the sum of the years of foundation of Waterman, 1883, and Boucheron, 1858). The pen remains one of the most sought after pieces within the fine writing category.

In 2006, Boucheron and Alexander McQueen collaborated to create a limited-edition Novak bag that incorporates the snake motif of Boucheron's Trouble line.

The beginning of a collaboration between Boucheron and Swiss watchmaker Girard-Perregaux started a year later in 2007, amongst which feature the LadyHawk Tourbillon and the limited Boucheron tribute watch.

In 2010, Boucheron and MB&F launched the HM3 JwlryMachine timepiece.

In 2023, Boucheron collaborated with Institute for Research and Coordination in Acoustics/Music and technology company SPhotonix to create a new piece in its Quatre collection, the Quatre 5D Memory ring, that incorporates a capsule containing a recorded sound memory of ocean waves. The ring uses 5D optical storage technology, which allows data to be encoded in nanostructured glass for long-term (billions of years) preservation and became one of the first applications of such technology in jewellery.

=== Boucheron today ===
Boucheron was a family business; after the death of its founder Frédéric Boucheron in 1902, his descendants took over the business. In 1994, the family business shifted to a more global approach with its selling out to Schweizerhall.

The House of Boucheron was then acquired by former Gucci in 2000, which was bought by PPR in 2004. Pierre Bouissou was appointed CEO in April 2011 and was replaced by Helene Poulit-Duquesne in July 2015. It has 34 boutiques worldwide and an online e-commerce website launched in 2007. Claire Choisne was appointed Creative Director in 2011. The company's estimated sales (in 2010/2011) were €50 million in total sales and €5 million in watches.

== Governance ==
=== CEOs ===
- Since 2015: Hélène Poulit-Duquesne
- 2011-2015: Pierre Bouissou

=== Creative directors ===
- Since 2011: Claire Choisne
- 2001-2004: Solange Azagury-Partridge

== Products ==
Boucheron makes watches, and jewelry, and licenses its marque for perfumes. The watch and jewelry making segments have existed for over 150 years. The first fragrance, "Boucheron," was launched in 1988. Over 22 men's and women's fragrances have been released. Since 2011 Boucheron fragrances have been created, produced and distributed under license by Interparfums.

== Boucheron International Rating of Diamonds ==
Boucheron has compiled a classification system by which to determine the value of a diamond, developed on the basis of the diamond's international currency. The Boucheron method of appreciation has been registered under the name B.I.R.D. (Boucheron International Rating of Diamonds). This original classification system is based on an evaluation of diamond quality and relies on a combined analysis of two criteria: first, the degree of clarity and second, the colour of the stone. The point at which these two variables, "clarity" and "colour" intersect gives rise to a mark of appreciation of between 90/100 and 99/100 for the quality of the diamond. A mark of 100/100 would indicate that a stone possesses the ultimate degree of perfection, according to Boucheron's criteria.

== Vertu mobile phone ==
In a joint venture with the mobile phone brand Vertu, Boucheron created the world's first High Jewelry limited edition cell phones out of gold and precious stones. This collaboration continued with the 150th anniversary celebration with a new line of 7 Vertu mobile phones inspired by Boucheron's High Jewellery "Enchanting Boucheron" anniversary collection. There are only eight pieces of the Cobra model in rose gold set all round with rubies and a pear-cut diamond and emerald eyes. Entwined around a rose gold case, the Python model, a serpent set with multi-coloured sapphires, diamonds and two sapphires, will be brought out in 26 pieces, as a reference to the famous jeweler's address, 26 place Vendôme.

== Retail ==
Boucheron operates 34 shops worldwide, including Paris, Cannes, Saint-Tropez, Monaco, Beirut, London, San Francisco, Tokyo, Saitama, Yokohama, Fukuoka, Kyoto, Osaka, Hiroshima, Okayama, Nagoya, Taipei, Seoul, Shanghai, Hong Kong, Kuala Lumpur, Dubai, Baku, Moscow, Toronto, Almaty, and Kuwait. The brand is also sold at 100 certified retailers.
