= Solange Azagury-Partridge =

British jewellery designer

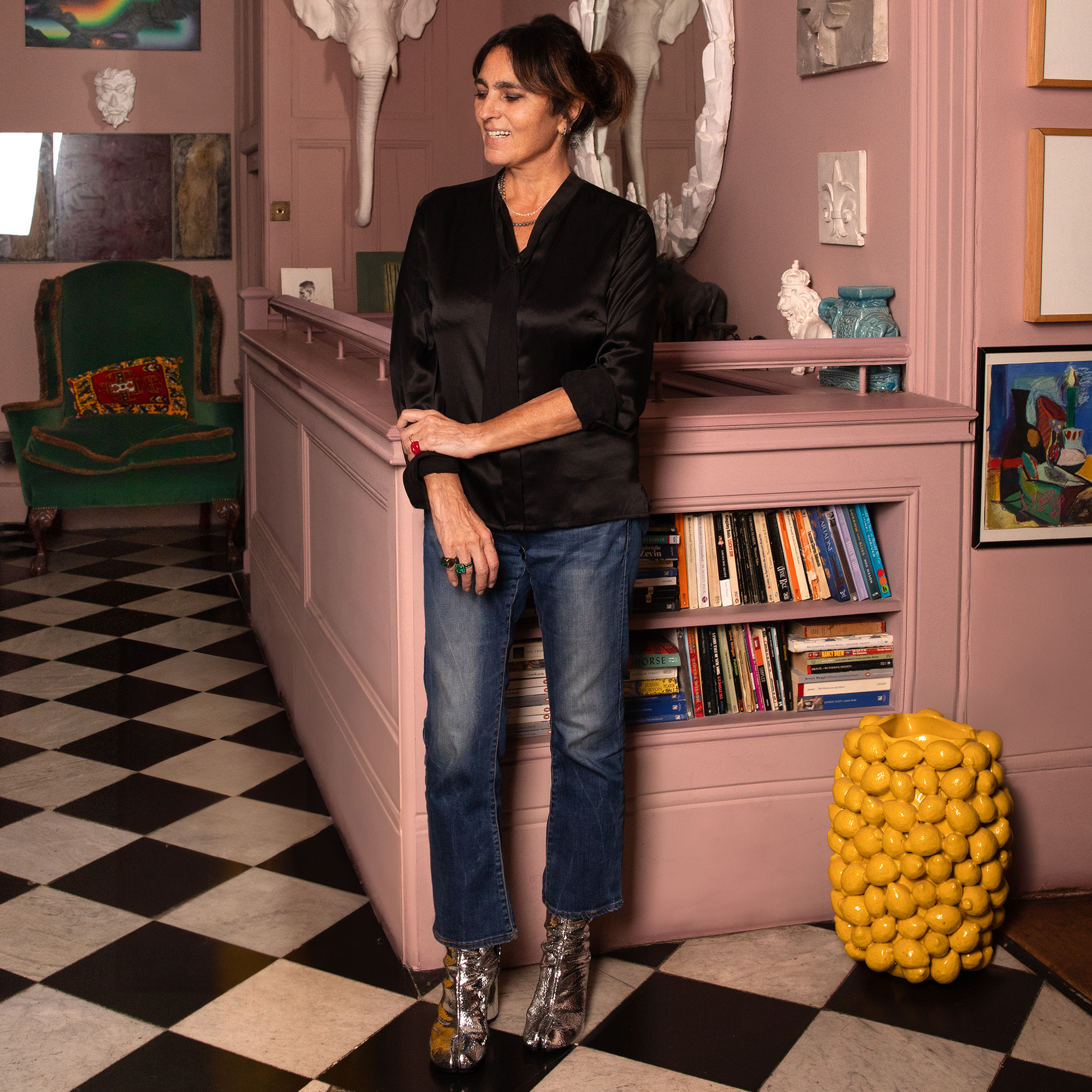
- Born: London, England
- Occupation: Jewellery designer
- Website: solange.co.uk

Solange Azagury-Partridge is a British designer known for her jewellery and interior designs. Based in London, she is the founder of her own brand called Solange.

== Career ==
The first piece of jewellery she made was her engagement ring in 1987 from her husband Murray Partridge, a simple gold band with an uncut diamond. She has stated that three years later, she taught herself how to design jewellery. In 1995 she opened a velvet-lined shop on Westbourne Grove cited by The Independent as "the most idiosyncratic jewellery shop in London".

In 2001 she was hired by Tom Ford of PPR as Creative Director of Boucheron, the Parisian jewellery firm founded in 1858. She worked there for three years before leaving to concentrate on her brand. During this time Solange designed four collections: Dangerous Beauty, L'Eau a la Bouche, Not Bourgeois and Quatre which continues to be their enduring bestselling collection. In 2004 pieces she designed for Boucheron were exhibited at the Musée des Arts Décoratifs, Paris and are now part of the permanent collection. Four years later pieces from Solange Azagury-Partridge were acquired for the Victoria and Albert Museum's permanent collection.

In 2008 she partnered with Labelux Group, a Joh. A. Benckiser division parent to British multinational consumer goods company Reckitt Benckiser, with a plan to roll out the brand internationally. Boutiques were opened in New York City, London, Beverly Hills, Singapore, and Hong Kong. In December 2012 it was announced that the brand was being sold back to its founder.

In 2009 the brand released a short film directed by Laurence Dunmore, starring Thandiwe Newton and Jason Isaacs entitled The Letter. She also designed a ring for the film Snow White and the Huntsman, worn by Charlize Theron who played the part of the Evil Queen.

In 2021, she was a judge on the first series of the BBC2 television programme, All That Glitters: Britain's Next Jewellery Star.

Solange's work and career is celebrated in Jewellery for Chromantics published by Rizzoli NY (November 2024).
