= List of The Jonathan Ross Show episodes =

The Jonathan Ross Show is a British chat show which began airing on ITV on 3 September 2011.

== Series overview ==
Series	Episodes	Originally released	
Series	Episodes	First released	Last released
1	9	3 September 2011	23 December 2011
2	12	7 January 2012	24 March 2012
3	14	18 August 2012	22 December 2012
4	20	5 January 2013	18 May 2013
5	11	12 October 2013	28 December 2013
6	10	4 January 2014	8 March 2014
7	10	18 October 2014	20 December 2014
8	11	24 January 2015	4 April 2015
9	11	17 October 2015	26 December 2015
10	13	9 January 2016	2 April 2016
11	11	10 September 2016	10 December 2016
12	12	2 September 2017	18 November 2017
13	15	1 September 2018	22 December 2018
14	10	2 March 2019	4 May 2019
15	15	14 September 2019	24 December 2019
16	11	17 October 2020	24 December 2020
17	8	10 April 2021	29 May 2021
18	9	23 October 2021	18 December 2021
19	9	15 October 2022	31 December 2022
20	7	25 February 2023	8 April 2023
21	7	17 February 2024	13 April 2024
22	8	15 February 2025	19 April 2025
23	8	7 February 2026	11 April 2026

== Episodes ==
=== Series 1 ===
No. overall	No. in series	Original release date	Guest(s)
1	1	3 September 2011	Sarah Jessica Parker, Lewis Hamilton and Adele
2	2	10 September 2011	Benedict Cumberbatch, The Saturdays, Alan Carr and Red Hot Chili Peppers
3	3	17 September 2011	Hugh Jackman, Stephen Fry, Peter Kay and Will Young
4	4	24 September 2011	Helen Mirren, Harry Hill, Louie Spence and Kasabian
5	5	1 October 2011	Alan Partridge, Ewan McGregor, Gary Barlow, Tulisa and CeeLo Green
6	6	8 October 2011	Lee Evans, Jamie Oliver and Lady Gaga
7	7	15 October 2011	Seth Rogen, Michael Bublé, David Walliams and Coldplay
8	8	22 October 2011	Michael Sheen, Miranda Hart and Noel Gallagher
9	9	23 December 2011	Tom Cruise, Simon Bird, Joe Thomas, James Buckley, Blake Harrison, Jessica Brown Findlay, Michelle Dockery, Laura Carmichael and Il Volo (Note: When this episode was filmed, Tim Minchin performed a specially written Christmas song called "WoodyAllenJesus", however a few days before the show was to air the head of ITV asked that the performance be edited out of the show.)

=== Series 2 ===
No. overall	No. in series	Original release date	Guest(s)
10	1	7 January 2012	John Bishop, Brian Cox, Louise Hazel, Francesca Halsall, Jade Jones and Lana Del Rey
11	2	14 January 2012	Paddy McGuinness, Emma Thompson, Brooke Shields, Petr Spatina and Florence and the Machine
12	3	21 January 2012	Daniel Radcliffe, David Attenborough, Noel Fielding and Seal
13	4	28 January 2012	Kermit the Frog, Miss Piggy, Hugh Bonneville, Jack Whitehall and Arctic Monkeys
14	5	4 February 2012	David Beckham, Kevin Bridges and Jessie J
15	6	11 February 2012	Denzel Washington, Keira Knightley, Tom Hardy and Dionne Warwick
16	7	18 February 2012	John Hurt, Keith Lemon, Fearne Cotton, Holly Willoughby, Christina Ricci and LMFAO
17	8	25 February 2012	Amir Khan, Sean Bean, JLS and Rizzle Kicks
18	9	3 March 2012	Lionel Richie, Imelda Staunton, Michael Ball and Rihanna
19	10	10 March 2012	Kiefer Sutherland, Amanda Seyfried, Freddie Flintoff and Paul Weller
20	11	17 March 2012	Sarah Millican, Sugar Ray Leonard, Gok Wan and Snow Patrol
21	12	24 March 2012	Danny DeVito, Dara Ó Briain, Simon Cowell, David Walliams and Labrinth

=== Series 3 ===
No. overall	No. in series	Original release date	Guest(s)
22	1	18 August 2012	Colin Farrell, Kelly Brook, Jessica Ennis, Tom Daley, Usain Bolt and Rita Ora
23	2	25 August 2012	Jenson Button, Dom Joly, Suranne Jones, Ray Winstone and Stooshe
24	3	1 September 2012	Mo Farah, Rosie Huntington-Whiteley, Gareth Malone and Plan B
25	4	8 September 2012	Andrew Lloyd Webber, Melanie C, Tim Minchin, Ben Forster, Kayvan Novak and Cheryl Cole
26	5	15 September 2012	Liam Neeson, Justin Bieber, Clare Balding and The Killers
27	6	22 September 2012	Michael Gambon, Emily Blunt, John Bishop, David Guetta and Fun.
28	7	29 September 2012	Emma Watson, Jack Dee, Dynamo and No Doubt
29	8	6 October 2012	Stephen Fry, Taylor Swift, Gary Barlow, Nicole Scherzinger, Dermot O'Leary and Ellie Goulding
30	9	13 October 2012	David Walliams, Stacey Solomon, Charlotte Church and Ed Sheeran
31	10	20 October 2012	Bradley Cooper, David Mitchell, Steven Tyler, Joe Perry and Emeli Sandé
32	11	27 October 2012	Kylie Minogue, Bear Grylls, Russell Howard and Muse
33	12	3 November 2012	Olly Murs, Frankie Boyle, Melissa George, Richard Cheese, Tinie Tempah and Calvin Harris
34	13	10 November 2012	Damian Lewis, Katherine Jenkins, Danny Baker and PSY
35	14	22 December 2012	Sienna Miller, Sheridan Smith, Ellie Simmonds, Michael McIntyre, Jamie Oliver and Charlotte Church

=== Series 4 ===
No. overall	No. in series	Original release date	Guest(s)
36	1	5 January 2013	Jeremy Piven, David Tennant, Sarah Millican, Phil Taylor and Jake Bugg
37	2	12 January 2013	Jamie Foxx, Paloma Faith, Micky Flanagan and Biffy Clyro
38	3	19 January 2013	Eddie Redmayne, Kimberley Walsh, Jo Brand and Madness
39	4	26 January 2013	Jools Holland, Rose Byrne, Adam Hills and Alicia Keys
40	5	2 February 2013	Eddie Izzard, David Attenborough, Dolph Lundgren, Russell Brand and Pulp
41	6	9 February 2013	John C. Reilly, Hayley Atwell, Adam Ant, Brian Cox and Hurts
42	7	16 February 2013	Ant & Dec, Tim Roth, Gino D'Acampo and Kesha
43	8	23 February 2013	Justin Timberlake, Joss Stone, Jason Manford and Tom Odell
44	9	2 March 2013	Olga Kurylenko, Carol Vorderman, Jack Whitehall and Bruno Mars
45	10	9 March 2013	Olivia Newton-John, Keith Lemon, Jonathan Goodwin and Nicole Scherzinger
46	11	16 March 2013	Ian McKellen, Matt Smith, Ruth Jones, Charles Dance, Rose Leslie, Kit Harington and Stereophonics
47	12	23 March 2013	Danny Boyle, Nicholas Hoult, Ian McShane, Damon Albarn and Bobby Womack
48	13	30 March 2013	James Nesbitt, Warwick Davis, Jourdan Dunn and Depeche Mode
49	14	6 April 2013	Ben Kingsley, Audrey Tautou, Carl Froch and Alt-J
50	15	13 April 2013	Julian Clary, Martin and Gary Kemp, John Simm, Millie Mackintosh, Spencer Matthews, Jamie Laing, Ollie Locke, Alexandra Felstead and Suede
51	16	20 April 2013	Steve Coogan, Saoirse Ronan, Francesca Martinez and will.i.am
52	17	27 April 2013	Meat Loaf, Russell Tovey, Joanna Lumley, Peter Andre and Rudimental
53	18	4 May 2013	Zachary Quinto, Zoe Saldaña, Russell Howard, Jeremy Kyle and Thom Yorke
54	19	11 May 2013	Vin Diesel, Jamie and Louise Redknapp, Yoko Ono, The Illusionists and Bastille
55	20	18 May 2013	Max Beesley, Philip Glenister, Marc Warren, Gemma Arterton, Carla Bruni, Lee Evans and Primal Scream

=== Series 5 ===
No. overall	No. in series	Original release date	Guest(s)
56	1	12 October 2013	Tom Hanks, Sandra Bullock, Cilla Black and James Arthur
57	2	19 October 2013	Gordon Ramsay, Julie Walters, Frank Lampard, Harry Redknapp and Dizzee Rascal
58	3	26 October 2013	Naomi Campbell, Louis Walsh, Gary Barlow, Nicole Scherzinger, Stephen Merchant, Alfie Boe and Laura Mvula
59	4	2 November 2013	Jonathan Rhys Meyers, Joanne Froggatt, Rob James-Collier, Steve Coogan, Paul Hollywood and Pet Shop Boys
60	5	9 November 2013	Celine Dion, Andy Murray, John Barrowman, Johnny Vegas and Boyzone
61	6	16 November 2013	Oprah Winfrey, Forest Whitaker, One Direction, Sarah Millican and Eminem
62	7	23 November 2013	Simon Pegg, Dame Edna Everage, Michelle Keegan and Gary Barlow
63	8	30 November 2013	Chris Tarrant, Joanna Lumley, Keith Lemon and Olly Murs
64	9	7 December 2013	Olivia Colman, Tom Daley, Brian Cox, Jack Dee and Ellie Goulding
65	10	14 December 2013	David Beckham, Gillian Anderson, Will Ferrell and Leona Lewis
66	11	28 December 2013	David Attenborough, Jamie Oliver, Jimmy Doherty, Ray Winstone, John Bishop and Rizzle Kicks

=== Series 6 ===
No. overall	No. in series	Original release date	Guest(s)
67	1	4 January 2014	Jennifer Saunders, Naomie Harris, Paddy McGuinness and Jamie Cullum
68	2	11 January 2014	Aaron Eckhart, Jayne Torvill, Christopher Dean, Karren Brady, Griff Rhys Jones and Kodaline
69	3	18 January 2014	Russell Brand, Linda Robson, Dermot O'Leary and James Blunt
70	4	25 January 2014	Robert Lindsay, Rufus Hound, Seann Walsh, Sam Bailey and Tinie Tempah
71	5	1 February 2014	Liam Neeson, Goldie Hawn, Danny Dyer, Peter Andre and Pixie Lott
72	6	8 February 2014	Kiefer Sutherland, Kevin Bridges, Emily Mortimer, Chris O'Dowd and John Legend
73	7	15 February 2014	Uma Thurman, Abbey Clancy, Andrew Marr, James Corden and John Newman
74	8	22 February 2014	Jack Whitehall, Bradley Walsh, Jenny Jones, Lizzy Yarnold and McBusted
75	9	1 March 2014	Claudia Schiffer, Dara Ó Briain, Kristin Davis, Ice Cube and Rufus Wainwright
76	10	8 March 2014	Jennifer Hudson, Richard Branson, Davina McCall, Sue Perkins and Elbow

=== Series 7 ===
No. overall	No. in series	Original release date	Guest(s)
77	1	18 October 2014	Steve Carell, David Attenborough, Mel B, Cheryl Fernandez-Versini and Paolo Nutini
78	2	25 October 2014	Daniel Radcliffe, Lindsay Lohan, Russell Brand, Rio Ferdinand and The Script
79	3	1 November 2014	Keira Knightley, Paul Hollywood, Gareth Thomas, Paul Merton and London Grammar
80	4	8 November 2014	Frank Skinner, Stanley Tucci, Natalie Dormer, Lorraine Kelly and Lily Allen
81	5	15 November 2014	Gordon Ramsay, Michael Palin, Katherine Jenkins, Carey Mulligan and Kasabian
82	6	22 November 2014	Lee Evans, Sheila Hancock, Noel Gallagher, Jack Whitehall and Boyzone
83	7	29 November 2014	James McAvoy, Sarah Millican, Phillip Schofield and Barry Manilow
84	8	6 December 2014	Miranda Hart, Paul McCartney, Jeremy Clarkson, Martin Freeman and Ella Henderson
85	9	13 December 2014	James Corden, Tulisa Contostavlos, Jon Hamm, Boris Johnson, Keith Lemon and Paloma Faith
86	10	20 December 2014	David Walliams, Barbara Windsor, Lewis Hamilton, Jimmy Carr, Ed Sheeran and Idina Menzel

=== Series 8 ===
No. overall	No. in series	Original release date	Guest(s)
87	1	24 January 2015	Colin Firth, Taron Egerton, Caroline Quentin, Katherine Ryan and Take That
88	2	31 January 2015	Diana Rigg, Mel Giedroyc, Sue Perkins, Danny Dyer and Johnny Vegas
89	3	7 February 2015	Kevin Hart, Felicity Jones, Stephen Fry and Freddie Flintoff
90	4	14 February 2015	Ant & Dec, Alan Davies, Goldie Hawn and Diana Krall
91	5	21 February 2015	Jennifer Saunders, Paddy McGuinness, Matt Lucas and Romesh Ranganathan
92	6	28 February 2015	Sigourney Weaver, Martin Clunes, Thierry Henry, Tracey Emin and Kanye West
93	7	7 March 2015	Damian Lewis, Paloma Faith, Josh Widdicombe and Bryan Ferry
94	8	14 March 2015	Madonna
95	9	21 March 2015	Elizabeth Hurley, Russell Crowe, Lily James, David Mitchell and Chic
96	10	28 March 2015	Keanu Reeves, Lucy Beaumont, Russell Brand and Olly Murs
97	11	4 April 2015	Ethan Hawke, Clare Balding, Bear Grylls, Kylie Minogue and James Bay

=== Series 9 ===
No. overall	No. in series	Original release date	Guest(s)
98	1	17 October 2015	Jessica Ennis-Hill, Vin Diesel, Harry Enfield, Paul Whitehouse and Sir Tom Jones
99	2	24 October 2015	Martin Clunes, Nick Frost, Darcey Bussell, Tinie Tempah and John Newman
100	3	31 October 2015	Priscilla Presley, Elvis Costello, Rob Beckett, Danny Dyer and Caravan Palace
101	4	7 November 2015	Joan Collins, Danny DeVito and Sheridan Smith
102	5	14 November 2015	Cristiano Ronaldo, Agyness Deyn, David Tennant and James Morrison
103	6	21 November 2015	Michael McIntyre and One Direction
104	7	28 November 2015	David Attenborough, Idris Elba, Keith Lemon and Liv Tyler
105	8	5 December 2015	Burt Reynolds, Simon Pegg, Michaela Coel and Coldplay
106	9	12 December 2015	John Bishop, Lewis Hamilton, Kara Tointon, Mel Giedroyc and Hozier
107	10	19 December 2015	Harrison Ford, David Walliams, Jamie Oliver and Jess Glynne
108	11	26 December 2015	Ian McKellen, Aziz Ansari, Lily James, Fiona Bruce and Coldplay

=== Series 10 ===
No. overall	No. in series	Original release date	Guest(s)
109	1	9 January 2016	Steve Carell, Gordon Ramsay and Ellie Goulding
110	2	16 January 2016	Michael Caine, Sylvester Stallone, Michael B. Jordan and Sue Perkins
111	3	23 January 2016	Catherine Tate, John Krasinski, Will Poulter, Kevin Bridges and Rudimental
112	4	30 January 2016	Brenda Blethyn, James Norton, Johnny Vegas and Craig David
113	5	6 February 2016	Jo Brand, Adam Hills, Alex Brooker, Josh Widdicombe, Andrew "Freddie" Flintoff and Jason Derulo
114	6	13 February 2016	Sacha Baron Cohen, Stephen Fry, Amy Poehler, Romesh Ranganathan and Shawn Mendes
115	7	20 February 2016	Taylor Lautner, Rob Brydon, Ronan Keating, Johanna Konta and Lukas Graham
116	8	27 February 2016	Alesha Dixon, Tim Roth, Tom Hollander, Seann Walsh and Stereophonics
117	9	5 March 2016	Richard Gere, Roisin Conaty, Jack Black, Berry Gordy and the cast of Motown: The Musical
118	10	12 March 2016	Glenn Close, Marlon Wayans, Gillian Anderson, David Baddiel and Carrie Underwood
119	11	19 March 2016	Hugh Jackman, Taron Egerton, Shazia Mirza, Luke Evans and Primal Scream
120	12	26 March 2016	Carrie Fisher, Russell Howard, Dylan Hartley, Billy Vunipola, Danny Care, Jonathan Joseph and Katherine Jenkins
121	13	2 April 2016	Kit Harington, Anna Friel, Frankie Boyle, Tinie Tempah and Zara Larsson

=== Series 11 ===
No. overall	No. in series	Original release date	Guest(s)
122	1	10 September 2016	Renee Zellweger, Patrick Dempsey, John Malkovich, Laura Trott, Jason Kenny, Maddie Hinch, Aisling Bea and Tom Odell
123	2	17 September 2016	Amy Schumer, Bear Grylls, Riz Ahmed and Olly Murs
124	3	24 September 2016	Jamie Dornan, Millie Bobby Brown, Caleb McLaughlin, Gaten Matarazzo, Rob Beckett, Davina McCall and Zara Larsson
125	4	1 October 2016	Alexander Skarsgård, Emily Blunt, Luke Evans and Britney Spears
126	5	8 October 2016	Darcey Bussell, Jack Whitehall, Alan Carr and Years & Years
127	6	15 October 2016	Russell Brand, Alan Davies, Sharon Horgan, Matt Goss, Luke Goss and Rebecca Ferguson
128	7	22 October 2016	Phil Collins, James Nesbitt, Fay Ripley, John Thomson and Joe Lycett
129	8	29 October 2016	Shawn Mendes, Nicole Scherzinger, Gino D'Acampo and Stephen Merchant
130	9	5 November 2016	Michael Douglas, Keith Lemon, John Bishop, Michelle Keegan and OneRepublic
131	10	12 November 2016	Jeremy Clarkson, Robbie Williams, Little Mix and Micky Flanagan
132	11	10 December 2016	David Walliams, Miranda Hart, Paul Hollywood, Keira Knightley and Kylie Minogue

=== Series 12 ===
No. overall	No. in series	Original release date	Guest(s)
133	1	2 September 2017	John Bishop, Mo Farah, Suranne Jones and Harry Styles
134	2	9 September 2017	Joan Collins, Natalie Dormer, Jack Dee and Rag'n'Bone Man
135	3	16 September 2017	Julianne Moore, Jeff Bridges, Taron Egerton, Noel Fielding, Paul Hollywood and Craig David
136	4	23 September 2017	Mel Brooks, Russell Brand, Lewis Hamilton and Paloma Faith
137	5	30 September 2017	Demi Lovato, Martin Clunes, Holly Willoughby, Henry Fraser and James Arthur
138	6	7 October 2017	Kit Harington, Liv Tyler, Mary J. Blige, Sue Perkins, Rob Beckett and Dua Lipa
139	7	14 October 2017	Vince Vaughn, Stormzy, Jamie Bell, Annette Bening, Bradley Walsh and Jamie Lawson
140	8	21 October 2017	Ed Sheeran, Gordon Ramsay, Russell Howard and Rita Ora
141	9	28 October 2017	Tina Turner, Katherine Ryan, Clare Balding, Andrew Garfield and Plan B
142	10	4 November 2017	Jodie Foster, David Walliams, Roisin Conaty and Blondie
143	11	11 November 2017	Grace Jones, Nicole Scherzinger, Nadiya Hussain, Micky Flanagan and Stormzy feat. MNEK
144	12	18 November 2017	Peter Kay, Luke Evans, Sheridan Smith, Iain Stirling and The Script

=== Series 13 ===
No. overall	No. in series	Original release date	Guest(s)
145	1	1 September 2018	Kevin Hart, Tiffany Haddish, Mel Giedroyc, Rob Beckett, Dave Bautista and Jess Glynne
146	2	8 September 2018	Cate Blanchett, Jack Black, Ashley Banjo, Ray Winstone, Paul Whitehouse, Joanna Lumley and John Legend
147	3	15 September 2018	David Mitchell, Dina Asher-Smith, Josh Groban, Keith Lemon and Hozier
148	4	22 September 2018	Lily Allen, Riz Ahmed, Gemma Chan, Jason Manford and Jonas Blue
149	5	29 September 2018	Paul Hollywood, Prue Leith, Noel Fielding, Kerry Godliman, Mo Gilligan and Olly Murs
150	6	6 October 2018	Gordon Ramsay, Fred Sirieix, Gino D'Acampo, Bear Grylls, Romesh Ranganathan and Rita Ora
151	7	13 October 2018	Peter Crouch, Michaela Coel, Shirley Ballas, Darcey Bussell, Craig Revel Horwood, Joe Lycett and Tom Odell
152	8	20 October 2018	Eric Idle, Nish Kumar, Chris O'Dowd and Katherine Jenkins
153	9	27 October 2018	Brendan O'Carroll, Emma Willis, Chabuddy G and Boyzone
154	10	3 November 2018	Stormzy, Chelsea Kwakye, Jude Yawson, Russell Howard, Boy George, Alesha Dixon and Sigrid
155	11	10 November 2018	The Spice Girls, John Bishop, Novak Djokovic and Kylie Minogue & Jack Savoretti
156	12	17 November 2018	Cliff Richard, Jeff Goldblum, Katherine Ryan, Nadiya Hussain and Snow Patrol
157	13	8 December 2018	Michael Caine, David Walliams, Mo Farah, Sue Perkins and George Ezra
158	14	15 December 2018	Joan Collins, Danny Dyer, Kevin Bridges, Big Narstie and Anne-Marie & James Arthur
159	15	22 December 2018	Gillian Anderson, Rob Lowe, Rahul Mandal, Tom Allen, Sheridan Smith, John Legend and The Kingdom Choir

=== Series 14 ===
No. overall	No. in series	Original release date	Guest(s)
160	1	2 March 2019	Brie Larson, Samuel L. Jackson, Jennifer Hudson, will.i.am, Seann Walsh and Bryan Adams
161	2	9 March 2019	Harry Redknapp, John Barnes, Naomi Campbell, Gemma Collins, James Acaster and Dido
162	3	16 March 2019	Jack Whitehall, Ralph Fiennes, Rachel Riley, Kathleen Roosens and Lizzo
163	4	23 March 2019	Colin Farrell, Danny DeVito, Jimmy Carr, Nicola Adams, Lolly Adefope and Lewis Capaldi
164	5	30 March 2019	Vicky McClure, Adrian Dunbar, Dani Dyer, Desiree Burch and Westlife
165	6	6 April 2019	Rob Beckett, Jenna Coleman, Carlos Acosta and Bebe Rexha
166	7	13 April 2019	Jeremy Clarkson, Emma Bunton, Sara Pascoe, Samson Kayo and Mumford & Sons
167	8	20 April 2019	Kiefer Sutherland, Winnie Harlow, Emily Maitlis and Olly Murs
168	9	27 April 2019	Michael Palin, Alexander Armstrong, Ashley Banjo, Katherine Ryan, Michael Sheen and Mark Ronson & Lykke Li
169	10	4 May 2019	Alan Carr, Rochelle Humes, Stephen Graham, Romesh Ranganathan and Ellie Goulding

=== Series 15 ===
No. overall	No. in series	Original release date	Guest(s)
170	1	14 September 2019	Elizabeth McGovern, Michelle Dockery, Stephen Fry, Craig David, Martin Freeman and Charli XCX & Christine and the Queens
171	2	21 September 2019	Sean Bean, Michelle Keegan, Rose Matafeo and Liam Gallagher
172	3	28 September 2019	Adam Lambert, Mel B, Russell Howard, Emily Mortimer and Ava Max
173	4	5 October 2019	Danny Dyer, McFly, Mo Gilligan, Roisin Conaty and Dermot Kennedy
174	5	12 October 2019	Gordon Ramsay, Dina Asher-Smith, Rob Beckett, Rosie Jones and The Script
175	6	19 October 2019	Iggy Pop, Aaron Paul, Jack Whitehall, Maya Jama and Sam Fender
176	7	26 October 2019	Shirley Ballas, Craig Revel Horwood, Motsi Mabuse, Nish Kumar, Liam Payne, Jonathan Van Ness and Tom Walker
177	8	2 November 2019	Trevor McDonald, Peter Crouch, Jourdan Dunn, Aisling Bea and John Newman & Nina Nesbitt
178	9	9 November 2019	Louis Walsh, Nicole Scherzinger, Tom Allen, Eleanor Tomlinson, Ben Youngs, Tom Curry, Manu Tuilagi, Joe Marler and Mabel
179	10	16 November 2019	John Bishop, Paul Hollywood, Naomi Ackie, Suzi Ruffell and Halsey
180	11	23 November 2019	David Walliams, Edward Norton, Kristen Stewart, Naomi Scott, Ella Balinska and Robbie Williams
181	12	30 November 2019	Andy Murray, Luke Evans, Adam Kay, Desiree Burch and Stormzy feat. Mahalia and Burna Boy
182	13	7 December 2019	Jeremy Clarkson, Glenda Jackson, Lena Dunham, Samson Kayo, Holly Willoughby and Stereophonics
183	14	14 December 2019	Rebel Wilson, Jason Derulo, Jofra Archer, Katherine Ryan, Penn Jillette and Keane
184	15	24 December 2019	David Tennant, Rita Ora, Sharon Osbourne, Rylan Clark-Neal, David Oyelowo, Bec Hill and Jamie Cullum

=== Series 16 ===
No. overall	No. in series	Original release date	Guest(s)
185	1	17 October 2020	Katherine Ryan, Clare Balding, Nick Frost, Samson Kayo and Billy Ocean
186	2	24 October 2020	Russell Howard, Katherine Jenkins, Daniel Mays and Dizzee Rascal
187	3	31 October 2020	Jack Whitehall, David Bailey, Roisin Conaty, Craig David and KSI
188	4	7 November 2020	Motsi Mabuse, Craig Revel Horwood, Rob Beckett, Sindhu Vee and Alicia Keys
189	5	14 November 2020	Tom Allen, Gbemisola Ikumelo, Joanna Lumley and Paloma Faith
190	6	21 November 2020	Michael McIntyre, Joe Wicks and Little Mix
191	7	28 November 2020	Matt Lucas, Jon Richardson, Lucy Beaumont, Lady Leshurr, Grayson Perry and Liam Gallagher
192	8	5 December 2020	Michael Palin, Joel Dommett, Davina McCall, Mo Gilligan and Kylie Minogue
193	9	12 December 2020	David Walliams, Micky Flanagan, Megan Thee Stallion, Judi Love and Robbie Williams
194	10	19 December 2020	Russell Kane, Maya Jama, Joan Collins and Tyson Fury
195	11	24 December 2020	Bradley Walsh, Barney Walsh, Michelle Keegan, Mo Farah, Kevin Bridges, Emily Atack and Jess Glynne

=== Series 17 ===
No. overall	No. in series	Original release date	Guest(s)
196	1	10 April 2021	Oti Mabuse, Jimmy Carr, Daisy May Cooper, Martin Kemp, Roman Kemp and James Arthur
197	2	17 April 2021	Anthony Joshua, Emily Blunt, Alan Carr and AJ Tracey
198	3	24 April 2021	Boy George, Prue Leith, Big Zuu, Joanne McNally and London Grammar
199	4	1 May 2021	Vicky McClure, Martin Compston, Ellie Simmonds, Ashley Banjo and Paul Weller
200	5	8 May 2021	Ian McKellen, Darcey Bussell, Romesh Ranganathan and Rag'n'Bone Man
201	6	15 May 2021	Tom Jones, Nicola Adams, Paloma Faith, Dave Bautista, James Acaster and Royal Blood
202	7	22 May 2021	David Walliams, Aisling Bea, Bree Runway and Noel Gallagher
203	8	29 May 2021	Jeremy Clarkson, Alesha Dixon, Steve Coogan, Emma Thompson, Emma Stone and Niall Horan & Anne-Marie

=== Series 18 ===
No. overall	No. in series	Original release date	Guest(s)
204	1	23 October 2021	Brian Cox, Joan Collins, Rob Beckett, Alex Scott and Duran Duran
205	2	30 October 2021	John Barnes, Hannah Waddingham, Will Poulter, Ed Sheeran, Nile Rodgers and James Arthur
206	3	6 November 2021	Dwayne Johnson, Ryan Reynolds, Gal Gadot, Michael McIntyre, Rob Delaney, Aisling Bea, Fatiha El-Ghorri and Ed Sheeran
207	4	13 November 2021	Jeremy Renner, Hailee Steinfeld, Paul Hollywood, Guz Khan and Kylie Minogue & Jessie Ware
208	5	20 November 2021	David Walliams, Mel Giedroyc, Sue Perkins, Louis Theroux, Kevin Hart and Westlife
209	6	27 November 2021	Riz Ahmed, Jeremy Clarkson, Stephen Merchant, Gary Barlow, Sheridan Smith and Sting
210	7	4 December 2021	Elton John, Rob Brydon, Michelle Keegan, Judi Love and Craig David & MNEK
211	8	11 December 2021	Usain Bolt, Joanna Lumley, Jamie Dornan, Shalom Brune-Franklin, Holly Willoughby and Damon Albarn
212	9	18 December 2021	Bradley Walsh, Roisin Conaty, Russell Howard and Leona Lewis

=== Series 19 ===
No. overall	No. in series	Original release date	Guest(s)
213	1	15 October 2022	Lewis Capaldi, Daisy May Cooper, Chloe Kelly, Tim Peake and Romesh Ranganathan
214	2	22 October 2022	Kelly Holmes, Rosie Huntington-Whiteley, Chris McCausland, Sara Pascoe, Hans Zimmer and Arctic Monkeys
215	3	29 October 2022	Rob Beckett, Georgina Campbell, Tom Daley, Judi Love, Benjamin Zephaniah and Dermot Kennedy
216	4	5 November 2022	Luke Evans, Ellie Goulding, Rita Ora, Sindhu Vee, Harry Redknapp and Jamie Redknapp
217	5	12 November 2022	Rio Ferdinand, Martin Freeman, Tyson Fury, Danai Gurira, Ellie Taylor, Sylvester Stallone, and Little Simz
218	6	19 November 2022	Craig David, Oti Mabuse, Matthew Modine, Katherine Ryan, Josh Jones and Wet Leg
219	7	26 November 2022	Joan Armatrading, Kate Hudson, Roisin Conaty and Stormzy
220	8	17 December 2022	Michael McIntyre, Gordon Ramsay, Big Zuu, Minnie Driver and Adam Lambert

=== Jonathan Ross' New Year Comedy Special ===
No. overall	No. in series	Original release date	Guest(s)
221	1	31 December 2022	Judi Love, Tom Allen, Babatunde Aleshe, Katherine Ryan, Bill Bailey and Ezra Collective

=== Series 20 ===
No. overall	No. in series	Original release date	Guest(s)
222	1	25 February 2023	Evangeline Lilly, Danny Dyer, Maisie Adam, Will Sharpe, Leomie Anderson and The 1975
223	2	4 March 2023	Peter Crouch, Abbey Clancy, Alan Carr, Babatunde Aléshé, Andy Serkis, Amy Gledhill and Paolo Nutini
224	3	11 March 2023	Niall Horan, Maya Jama, Prue Leith, Tom Davis and James Acaster
225	4	18 March 2023	Liam Neeson, Bella Ramsey, Mel Giedroyc, Munya Chawawa and Lady Blackbird
226	5	25 March 2023	Adam Sandler, Jennifer Aniston, Brian Cox, Ruth Wilson, Greg Davies, Jazmin Sawyers and Arlo Parks
227	6	1 April 2023	Ed Sheeran, Michael Bublé, Lily Allen, Russell Crowe and Desiree Burch
228	7	8 April 2023	John Legend, Jeff Goldblum, Jack Whitehall, Shirley Ballas and Lee Mack

=== Jonathan Ross Christmas Show ===
No. overall	No. in series	Original release date	Guest(s)
229	1	24 December 2023	Kevin Bridges, Willem Dafoe, Ariana DeBose, Boy George, Katherine Jenkins and Romesh Ranganathan and Claudia Schiffer

=== Series 21 ===
No. overall	No. in series	Original release date	Guest(s)
230	1	17 February 2024	Jack Whitehall, Cush Jumbo, KSI, and Paloma Faith
231	2	24 February 2024	Noel Fielding, Eddie Kadi, Katherine Ryan, Ray Winstone and The Vaccines
232	3	9 March 2024	Liam Gallagher, John Squire, Raye, Millie Bobby Brown, Rob Beckett and Luke Littler
233	4	23 March 2024	Paul Rudd, Billie Piper, Mel B, Leo Reich and Cat Burns
234	5	30 March 2024	Kirsten Dunst, David Walliams, Mary Earps, Sam Taylor-Johnson, Marisa Abela, Yung Filly and Madness
235	6	6 April 2024	Michael Palin, Anthony Joshua, Lulu, Tom Allen, Laura Smyth, and Jungle
236	7	13 April 2024	Perrie Edwards, Frank Skinner, Aisling Bea, Johannes Radebe, and Kasabian

=== Series 22 ===
No. overall	No. in series	Original release date	Guest(s)
237	1	15 February 2025	Brian Cox, Christina Hendricks, Oti Mabuse, Chris McCausland and Snow Patrol
238	2	22 February 2025	Gordon Ramsay, Danny Dyer, Vanessa Williams, Keely Hodgkinson, Harris Dickinson and Joan Armatrading
239	3	8 March 2025	Warwick Davis, Jodie Whittaker, Daisy May Cooper, Ashley Walters and Nova Twins
240	4	22 March 2025	Stephen Fry, Aimee Lou Wood, Big Zuu, Joanne McNally and Yungblud
241	5	29 March 2025	Pierce Brosnan, Ben Stiller, Adam Scott, Britt Lower, John Bishop, Judi Love and AJ Tracey and Jorja Smith
242	6	5 April 2025	Will Poulter, Jack Dee, Jill Scott, Craig David, Roisin Conaty and Simple Minds
243	7	12 April 2025	Martin Freeman, Bella Ramsey, Romesh Ranganathan, Jarvis Cocker, Sindhu Vee and Pulp
244	8	19 April 2025	Freddie Flintoff, Jason Isaacs, Rebel Wilson, David Oyelowo, Sophie Willan and Wet Leg

=== Series 23 ===
No. overall	No. in series	Original release date	Guest(s)
245	1	7 February 2026	Hugh Bonneville, Riz Ahmed, Ellie Kildunne, Harriet Kemsley and Jason Derulo
246	2	14 February 2026	Alan Carr, Neve Campbell, Rob and Lou Beckett, Archie Madekwe and Mumford & Sons
247	3	21 February 2026	Patrick Dempsey, Jack Whitehall, Danny Dyer, Dani Dyer and Self Esteem
248	4	7 March 2026	Kurt Russell, Tim Roth, David Byrne, Maggie Aderin, Sara Pascoe, and Noah Kahan
249	5	21 March 2026	Ruth Jones, Richard Ayoade, Sarah Michelle Gellar, Kathryn Newton, Alison Hammond and The Molotovs
250	6	28 March 2026	Joe Marler, Romesh Ranganathan, Aisling Bea, Roisin Conaty and Jalen Ngonda
251	7	4 April 2026	Kristin Scott Thomas, Katherine Ryan, Alan Davies, Mawaan Rizwan and Sienna Spiro
252	8	11 April 2026	Michael Palin, Catherine Tate, Anna Maxwell Martin, Aitch and Myles Smith
