= Seann Walsh =

English comedian and actor (born 1985)

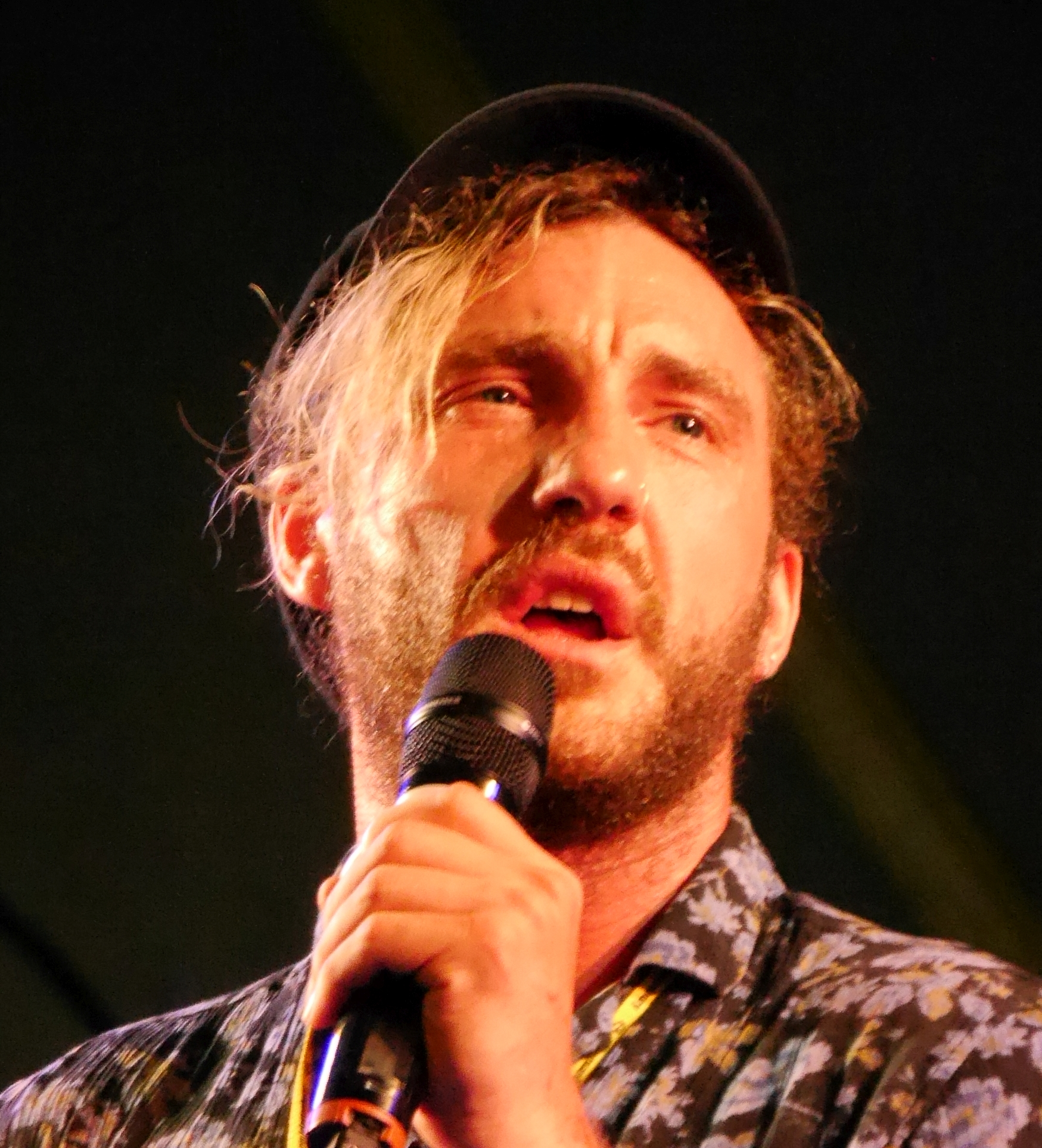
- Walsh at Glastonbury Festival 2019
- Born: Sean Christopher Walsh; 2 December 1985 (age 40); Camden, London, England
- Notable work: Mock the Week (2009–2013); Live at the Apollo(2011 to 2016); Seann Walsh World(2013); Seann Walsh's Late Night Comedy Spectacular(2013); Virtually Famous (2014–2017); I'm a Celebrity...Get Me Out of Here (2022)
- Partner(s): Rebecca Humphries (2013–2018); Grace Adderley (2019–present)

Comedy career
- Years active: 2006–present
- Medium: Stand-up, podcast
- Subjects: British culture, pop culture, self-deprecation, recreational drug use, drinking culture
- Website: Official website

Sean Christopher Walsh (born 2 December 1985), known professionally as Seann Walsh, is an English stand-up comedian and actor.

His long and successful stand-up career, includes three appearances on Live at the Apollo, and an appearance on Michael McIntyre's Comedy Roadshow. Since 2009 he has made numerous appearances on comedy panel shows and between 2014, and 2017, he was a team captain on Virtually Famous over four series of the show. For six episodes in 2013 he hosted the TV show Seann Walsh World, and for 2 episodes in 2013, and 2014, he hosted the stand-up comedy show Seann Walsh's Late Night Comedy Spectacular. In 2019 he also co-hosted 10 episodes of the Netflix game show Flinch.

From 2012, onwards, he has made numerous stand-up tours of the UK and Ireland and has performed at the Melbourne International Comedy Festival.

In 2022, he finished in 5th place in series 22 of I'm a Celebrity... Get Me Out of Here! In 2026, he was one of the contestants from previous series' of the show who returned to appear in the spin-off series, I'm a Celebrity... South Africa he was the first contestant to be eliminated, resulting in a 12th place finish.

== Early life ==
Walsh was born in Camden in London and in his early years lived in Lewisham with his mother, father and younger brother. Throughout Walsh's upbringing, his father was addicted to smoking heroin and Walsh has spoken about this experience in his stand-up comedy specials "Kiss" and "Seann Walsh: Is Dead, Happy Now?". His father would regularly take his sons to Queens Park Rangers F.C. Walsh and his brother remain supporters of QPR, he has described the stadium, as his "happy place". Walsh senior, worked as a planning engineer, including on the extension to the Jubilee line, and he also worked for the British Rail project, developing the concept of tilting trains.

Whilst in London his family "moved about quite a bit" and one of the primary schools he attended, was St Winifreds R.C. Primary school, in Lewisham. His family then moved from London, to Brighton, to accommodate his mother's work and it was there, he attended, Dorothy Stringer School, leaving the community school with a single GCSE examination pass in Drama. Walsh has said that he plagiarised coursework and was consequently kicked out of college. He has spoken of being hyperactive and a habit of regularly using cannabis at school, he was subject to suspension, several times.

During his youth, Walsh would often watch films starring Jim Carrey and stand-up specials featuring Lee Evans he would repeat lines, and re-enact scenarios from their performances. When Walsh was 17, he attended a stand-up comedy club in Brighton and the experience sparked his interest in writing and performing, comedy stand-up.

Walsh worked shifts at the Round Hill pub in Brighton, and at TK Maxx, but he was sacked from the discount-store, for falling asleep at work.

== Career ==
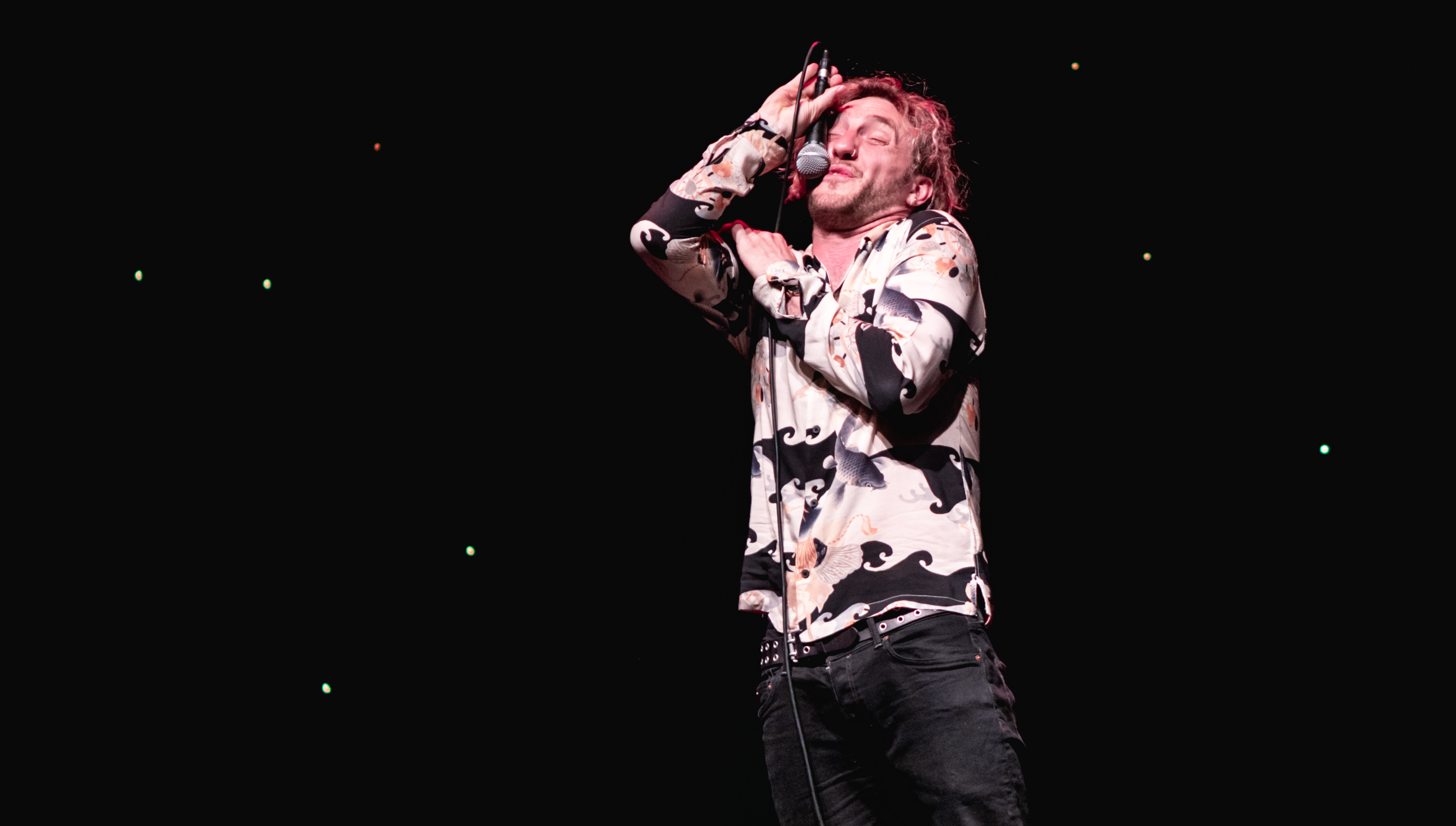
Walsh performing at Blackheath Halls. May 2019.

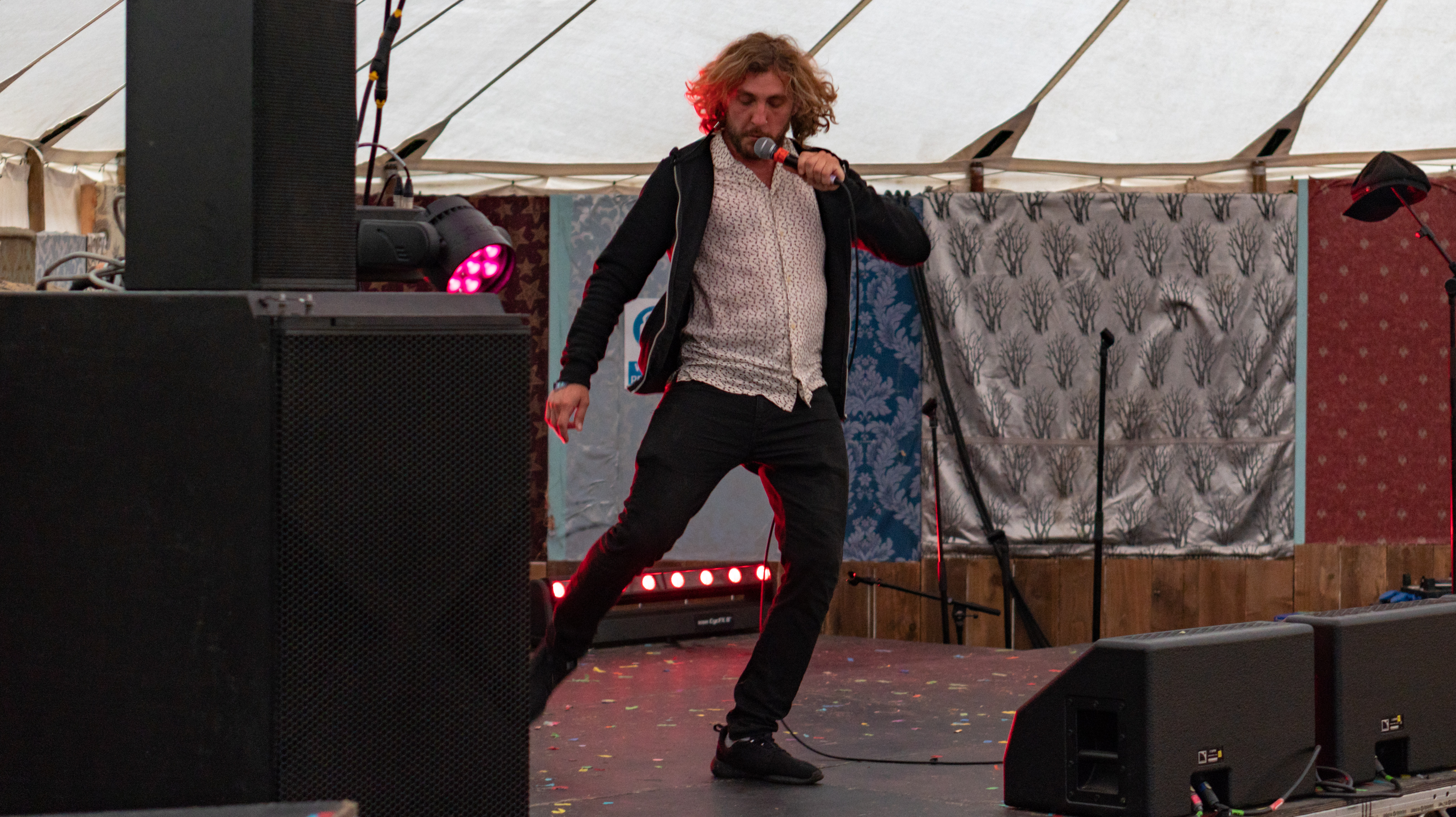
Walsh performing at the Standon Calling music festival in Standon, Hertfordshire. July 2018

In 2006, Walsh attended a stand-up comedy course run by Jill Edwards comedy workshops and held at the Komedia comedy club in Brighton and he performed his first gig in November 2006. Walsh went on to become the resident host of the newcomer stand-up comedy night Comic Boom, held at Komedia and he won several awards early in his career including Leicester Mercury Comedian of the Year (2009) and Chortle Best Newcomer (2009). Walsh supported Stephen K. Amos on his 2008/09 Find the Funny and 2009/10 The Feelgood Factor tours, as well as at the 2010 Reading and Leeds Festival. Early on in his career he was also an 'audience wrangler' performing stand up for the QI audience prior to the recording of the show.

In 2008 Walsh attended the Edinburgh Fringe Festival for the first time participating in the So You Think You're Funny newcomers competition as well as performing at the Free Edinburgh Fringe Festival and by 2018 he had attended 8 times. In 2009 Walsh appeared in his first solo show at the Edinburgh Fringe and he has commented "The first time I did a solo show in Edinburgh, four years ago, I had a panic attack on stage. I'd always wanted to do comedy, but there was too much stress. If you had a bad gig, there was no time to recover from it, and the next night you'd have another bad gig. I'd been smoking and drinking coffee all day, and it was drink, drink, drink after each show, and that was bound to have repercussions. For some reason I walked on stage and started at the wrong point in my act. I skipped the first 10 minutes and I couldn't get back. I couldn't breathe and I had a strange feeling in my teeth and I thought I was going to die. Then I just collapsed, I fell to the floor; the show had to stop and people had to leave." Walsh has further commented on his experiences with nerves in interviews with the media as well as on his podcast Class Clown, "Vittoria Angelone: '...let's put on a comedy night for the next freshers week and I'll host it. So I just MC'd. It was my first gig to 300 people.' Walsh: 'What?... ...And knowing you, um, from what everything you've said today, that didn't phase you at all?' Vittoria Angelone: 'Naivety, ignorance, no idea it was supposed to be hard.' Walsh: 'Oh man, I'm sorry, but I mean that's incredible because me starting sounds very similar to your, uh, your experience, believe it or not and I... knew what standing in front of 300 people was. That would have absolutely terrified me.'"

Walsh performed both his 2012 show Seann to Be Wild and his 2013 show The Lie-In King at the Edinburgh Fringe Festival as well as touring the country with both.

In 2013, Walsh attended a stand-up comedy competition in Brighton and saw Romesh Ranganathan performing and asked Ranganathan if he could be his warm up act on his stand up tour. Whilst on tour in 2013 Walsh would also appear on Stand Up for the Week and he was able to get Ranganathan a stand up gig as a warm up act for a press launch they were doing for the show and the producers of Live at the Apollo watched the gig Ranganathan performed at and later asked him to appear on series 9 of Live at the Apollo which was his first stand up TV performance.

He has also performed his solo show on tour with fellow comedian Josh Widdicombe in a tour titled Ying and Young.

From 2011 to 2013, Walsh appeared as a regular contributor on Stand Up for the Week, where Walsh would perform stand up to a live audience using material taken from current events in the media in his routine. For 4 series from 2014 to 2017 Walsh was a team captain on the comedy panel show Virtually Famous. On the show two teams are shown viral videos from the internet and they are then asked questions about them as well having to act out tasks in the same way that they're being done in the videos and the format for the show was very similar to Never Mind the Buzzcocks. Walsh was the scorekeeper on Play to the Whistle for three series and in series two he also became the host's assistant.

From 2017 to 2018, Walsh presented a weekly show on FUBAR Radio with comedian Mark Simmons that gave a comedic view of current events in the media.

From 8 September 2018, Walsh participated in the sixteenth series of Strictly Come Dancing with professional dance partner Katya Jones. Early in the series, it was reported that he had become romantically involved with Jones despite both of them being in long-term relationships, and his popularity suffered as a result. Walsh and Jones did an interview with Zoe Ball following the controversy, where after a televised grilling from Ball, Walsh apologised. The couple were voted out in Week 6.

For six episodes in 2013, he presented the TV show Seann Walsh World and in 2019 Seann co-hosted the Netflix gameshow Flinch, alongside Lloyd Griffith, and Desiree Burch. In the show contestants are put in circumstances that are discomforting, painful and scary, with the goal being to not flinch as if they do, the contestants receive a painful consequence and the hosts, who are being represented by the contestants, receive points.

In 2022, Walsh participated in Series 22 of I'm a Celebrity... Get Me Out of Here! on ITV1, and finished in 5th place. In 2026, he returned to appear in the spin-off show I'm a Celebrity... South Africa, which also aired on ITV1 and in this spin-off show memorable contestants from previous series return to the show which is now located in South Africa and they participate in survival trials to choose who is going to be eliminated from the show with only the winner being chosen by a public vote. Walsh was eliminated first after Harry Redknapp was asked to eliminate one of the team members on his team, as he had been made the team leader and had lost an eating trial he participated in against Jimmy Bullard, a member of the opposing team.

Walsh's stand-up style has been described as "impressively universal, gag-heavy, observational".

== Personal life ==
Walsh's relationship with actress Rebecca Humphries ended in October 2018 after a video and photos of him kissing his Strictly Come Dancing partner Katya Jones were published. It was later reported that Jones and her husband Neil Jones had separated as an indirect result of the incident. In a now-viral tweet, Humphries stated that Walsh had called her “mental” and “psycho” for voicing her suspicions about his relationship with Jones in the weeks leading up to the incident.

In her 2022 memoir Why Did You Stay?, Humphries wrote that Walsh had reacted similarly when confronted about other instances of inappropriate behaviour throughout their five-year relationship. Humphries described Walsh as an emotionally abusive, controlling, and aggressive partner, and stated that several women had come forward following the Strictly scandal to reveal Walsh’s numerous past affairs. Walsh subsequently incorporated his experiences on Strictly into his standup act. In March 2022, he described how the incident was still "trauma" for him and how he underwent treatment for depression and anxiety, to help him cope with the fallout.

Walsh is married to Grace Adderley a dance teacher, whom he met by chance in 2019, at a London Underground Station. He later re-enacted the first time they saw each other, with a romantic proposal of marriage. They previously lived in Shepherd's Bush London, and welcomed their first child, a daughter, in February 2023, and subsequently their son was born in 2025. Walsh supports Queens Park Rangers F.C..

Once Walsh became old enough to attend pubs and bars he would regularly go drinking with his friends and he includes his past experiences, of being drunk and having hangovers in his stand-up routines. He has been sober for several years. Walsh was also a former smoker of cigarettes in his twenties.

== Appearances ==
=== Television ===
Year	Title	Role	Notes
2009–2013	Mock the Week	Panelist	5 episodes
2010	Russell Howard's Good News	Himself	1 episode
2010	Big Brother's Big Mouth	Panelist	
2010	Michael McIntyre's Comedy Roadshow	Himself	Episode 5- Bristol
2011–2014	Never Mind the Buzzcocks	Panelist	4 episodes
2011–13	Stand Up for the Week	Himself	Series 2 - Episodes 5, 25 (including 1 guest appearance in series 2)
2011, 2013, 2016	Live at the Apollo	Himself	3 episodes
2011	Argumental	Team Captain	8 Episodes
2011	Mad Mad World	Panelist	1 Episode
2013	Celebrity Juice	Panelist	1 episode
2013	Alan Carr: Chatty Man	Himself	3 episodes
2013	Seann Walsh World	Presenter	6 episodes
2013	Big Bad World	Eggman	8 episodes - Sitcom for Comedy Central
2014, 2016, 2019	The Jonathan Ross Show	Himself	3 episodes
2013, 2014	Seann Walsh's Late Night Comedy Spectacular	Host	2 series, 2 episodes
2014–2017	Virtually Famous	Team Captain	4 series for E4
2015	Would I Lie to You?	Panelist	1 episode
2015, 2016	8 Out of 10 Cats	Panelist	3 episodes
2015	8 Out of 10 Cats Does Countdown	Panelist	2 episodes
2015, 2023	Alan Davies: As Yet Untitled	Himself	Series 2 and series 7.
2015	Play to the Whistle	Scorekeeper/Assistant	3 Series
2016	Tonight at the London Palladium	Himself	1 episode
2016	Stand Up Central	Himself	1 episode
2016	Seann Walsh: One for the Road	Himself	Documentary
2017–2018	Bad Move	Grizzo	Sitcom for ITV
2018	Conan	Himself	1 episode
2018	Strictly Come Dancing	Contestant	11th Place - Series 16
2019	The Stand Up Sketch Show	Himself	1 episode
2019	Flinch	Co-Host	10 episodes for Netflix
2022	The Lovebox in Your Living Room	Various	
2022	Mel Giedroyc: Unforgivable	Panelist	1 episode
2022	I'm a Celebrity...Get Me Out of Here!	Contestant	Series 22 - 5th Place
2023	CelebAbility	Himself	Series 7, Episodes 2 and 6
2023	The Last Leg	Himself	Series 29 Episode 8 - New Years Special: The Last Leg of the Year
2024	The Stand Up Sketch Show	Himself	Series 6 - Episodes 1 and 4
2024	Battle in the Box	Contestant	2 episodes (lost to Harriet Kemsley and Lara Ricote)
2025	I'm a Celebrity: Unpacked	Himself	3 episodes
2026	Live From The UK	Himself	1 episode
2026	I'm A Celebrity South Africa	Himself	Series 2 - 12th Place

=== Film ===
Year	Title	Role	Notes
2016	The Drunk: Getting Home	Main character	Also writer, producer and editor. Short Film
2021	Clown	Charlie Holmes	Also writer and producer Short film
2022	The Bystanders	Frank	

=== Radio ===
- Loose Ends v BBC Radio 4 (March 2009)
- The Jon Richardson Show – BBC 6 Music (November 2009)
- Nick Grimshaw's Radio Show – BBC Radio 1 (June 2010)
- Matt Forde's Show – Talksport Radio (May & June 2010)
- Act Your Age – BBC Radio 4 (April 2011)
- Scott Mills Radio Show - Innuendo Bingo – BBC Radio 1 (10 April 2015), (27 January 2017)
- News-ish with Seann Walsh and Mark Simmons - FUBAR Radio (2017 - 2018)
- Romesh Ranganathan - BBC Radio 2 (2 August 2025)

=== Podcasts ===
- Class Clown - Spotify, YouTube, Apple Pocasts, Play Podcasts (2025 - 2026)

=== Tours ===
Year	Title	Shows	Notes
2012–2013	Seann To Be Wild	80 dates	DVD release
2014	The Lie-In King		
2016	One for the Road	64 dates	
2019	After This One, I'm Going Home	88 shows	
2022	Seann Walsh is Dead. Happy Now?	63 shows	Debut at Edinburgh Fringe
2023–2024	Back from the Bed	TBC	
2026	This is Torture	February - October 2026	

=== Online releases ===
Show	Release date	Platform	Notes
Kiss	27 March 2022	Released on YouTube	
Seann Walsh is Dead, Happy Now?	7 April 2024	Released on YouTube	
Back From The Bed	15 December 2024	Released on YouTube	

== Awards ==
- Winner: Chortle award, best show 2023
- Winner: Leicester Mercury Comedian of the Year 2009
- Winner: Chortle Awards Best Newcomer 2009
- Second place: Hackney Empire New Act of the Year 2009
- Runner-up: Amused Moose Laugh Off 2008
- Runner-up: So You Think You're Funny 2008

== See also ==
- List of I'm a Celebrity...Get Me Out of Here! (British TV series) contestants
- List of Strictly Come Dancing contestants
