= Monster Tour =

Monster Tour may refer to:

- The Monster Ball Tour, a 2009–11 concert tour by Lady Gaga
- Monster World Tour (Kiss), a 2012–13 concert tour by Kiss
- Monsters Tour, a 2014 arena tour by Lee Evans
- The Monster Tour (Eminem and Rihanna), a 2014 co-headlining concert tour by Eminem and Rihanna
- Monster Tour, a 1995 concert tour by R.E.M. in support of their album Monster
