= Clive Exton =

British writer (1930–2007)

- Born: 11 April 1930; Islington, London, England
- Died: 16 August 2007 (aged 77); London, England
- Education: Royal Central School of Speech and Drama
- Occupation: Screenwriter

Clive Exton (11 April 1930 – 16 August 2007) was a British television and film screenwriter who wrote scripts for the series Poirot, Jeeves and Wooster and Rosemary & Thyme.

== Early career ==
He was born Clive Jack Montague Brooks in Islington, London, England, the son of a civil service clerk. He spent two years in the British Army, stationed in Germany. Equity, the actors' union, required his change of professional name, as there was already an actor registered under the name Clive Brook. After training at the Central School of Speech and Drama and deciding to act, he borrowed the name Exton from the character "Sir Piers Exton" in the William Shakespeare play Richard II.

His first television play, No Fixed Abode, was transmitted by Granada Television in 1959. He then contributed to Sydney Newman's Armchair Theatre series which included the episodes: "Where I Live", "Hold My Hand, Soldier", "I'll Have You to Remember," and "The Trial of Doctor Fancy," among others; the best of them being directed by Ted Kotcheff.

He later wrote "The Close Prisoner" (also with Kotcheff) for ATV's Studio 64 – a season of plays designed to emphasise the role of the writer in television – and Land of My Dreams, The Bone Yard, The Big Eat, Are You Ready For the Music? and The Rainbirds for the BBC. He also wrote The Boundary (1975), with Tom Stoppard, for the BBC's experimental series The Eleventh Hour. In 1975 and 1976, he adapted four of Graham Greene’s short stories for episodes of Shades of Greene presented by Thames Television. Most of this early work is now lost, having been made at a time when programmes recorded on tape were routinely wiped and telerecordings discarded. However, Exton also wrote Stigma, the 1977 episode of the BBC's A Ghost Story for Christmas, and ITV Playhouse's 1979 adaptation of M. R. James's Casting the Runes, both of which survive.

Exton then moved away from the single play and initiated series such as Killers, Conceptions of Murder and The Crezz, a depiction of Notting Hill life in the 1970s. He also contributed, under the pen name M. K. Jeeves, two episodes to the first season of Terry Nation's Survivors for the BBC.

Exton said that the only feature film he ever wrote that pleased him was 10 Rillington Place, with Sir Richard Attenborough (1971). Other films include Night Must Fall, The House in Nightmare Park, Isadora (with Melvyn Bragg and starring Vanessa Redgrave) and Entertaining Mr Sloane (from the Joe Orton play). He worked without credit on many films, but it is now known that he made major contributions to the scripts of Georgy Girl and The Bounty.

== Later career ==
A 10-year stay in Hollywood bore little fruit. He co-wrote The Awakening (1980), an adaptation of Bram Stoker's novel The Jewel of Seven Stars, and the action-adventure Red Sonja (starring Arnold Schwarzenegger, 1985), and, uncredited, contributed to The Bounty (with Sir Anthony Hopkins, 1984) before returning to Britain.

Returning to England in 1986, Exton found that the television business had radically changed through the rise of the independent producer, such as Brian Eastman, for whom he wrote 20 of the episodes of Agatha Christie's Poirot, with David Suchet (1989–2000), all of the episodes (23) of Jeeves and Wooster, with Hugh Laurie and Stephen Fry (1990–1993), and ten episodes of Rosemary & Thyme (2003–2006).

He also dramatised for television works by Jean Cocteau, Daphne du Maurier, Graham Greene, Somerset Maugham, Ruth Rendell, Georges Simenon and H. G. Wells.

He was married twice, first to Patricia Fletcher Ferguson (1951–1957), with whom he had two daughters (Ghislaine Frances Crerar Metcalfe and Sara Charlotte Montague-Brooks), and then from 1957 until his death to Margaret "Mara" Reid, with whom he had three children, two daughters (Antigone Margaret Exton White and Cornelia Plaxy Locatelli) and a son (Saul Alexander).

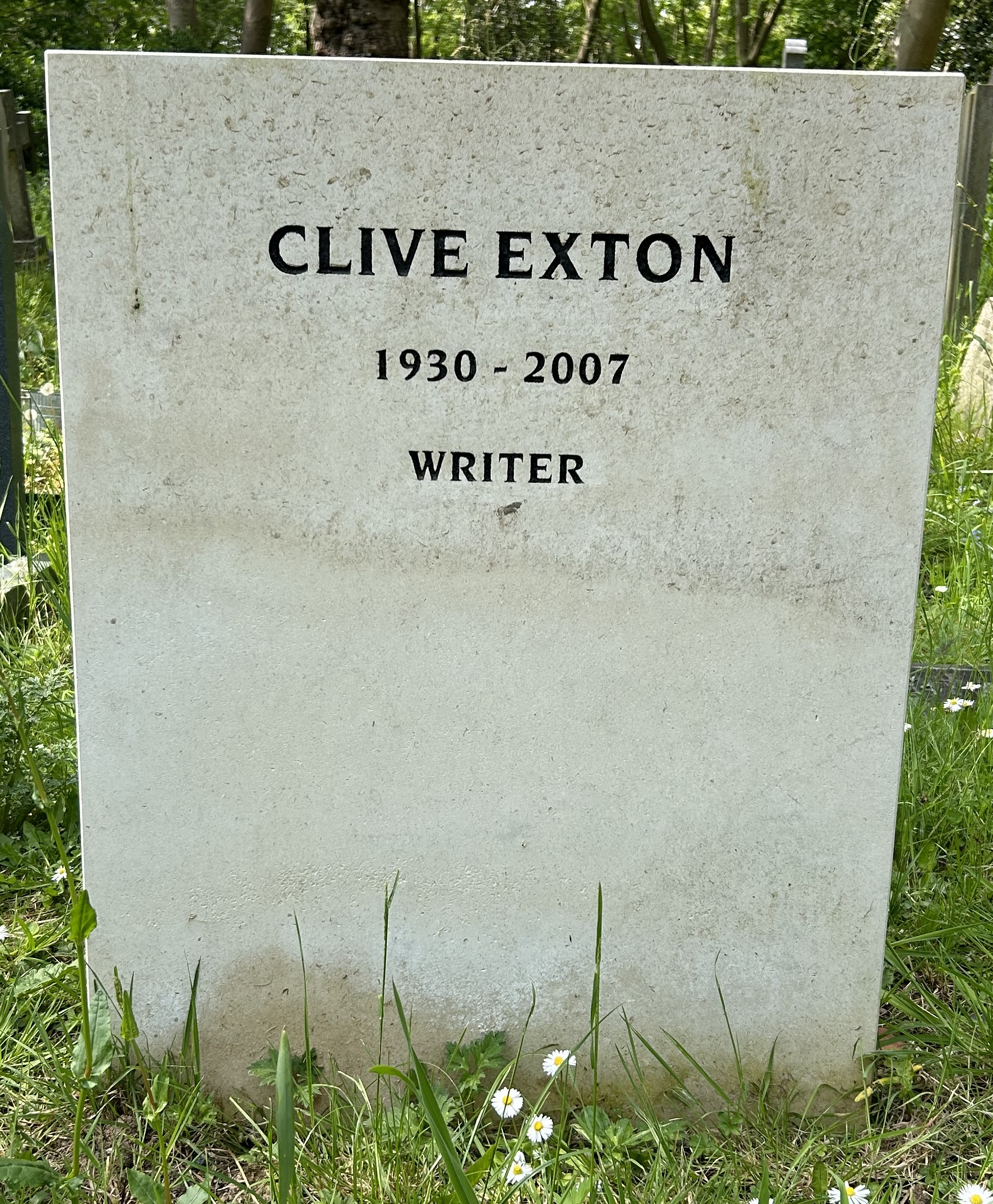
Grave of Clive Exton in Highgate Cemetery

Exton died in London of brain cancer on 16 August 2007. His ashes are buried on the east side of Highgate Cemetery.

Exton wrote only sporadically for the theatre:

- Have You Any Dirty Washing, Mother Dear? (1970)
- Twixt (1990), Dressing Down (1995)
- Barking in Essex (2005)

Barking in Essex made its West End début in September 2013 and starred Lee Evans, Sheila Hancock and Keeley Hawes.
