= Flinch (game show) =

Television game show

- Official Netflix Poster
- Genre: Game show
- Presented by: Lloyd Griffith; Desiree Burch; Seann Walsh
- Composer: Score Draw Music
- Country of origin: United Kingdom
- Original language: English
- No. of series: 1
- No. of episodes: 10

Production
- Production location: Northern Ireland
- Running time: 20–25 minutes
- Production company: Stellify Media

Original release
- Network: Netflix
- Release: 3 May 2019

Flinch (stylized as FL!NCH) is a British television game show. The show is produced by Stellify Media, and debuted on Netflix on 3 May 2019. The show is hosted by Lloyd Griffith, Desiree Burch and Seann Walsh. The show's format sees contestants being made to flinch, and if they indeed flinch there are immediate consequences.

== Development ==
Stellify Media's joint-MD Matthew Worthy proposed a game show where contestants are not allowed to move—and if they do move, something terrible happens. From there, a taster tape was shot in Worthy's barn. Wayne Garvie, president of international production at Sony Pictures Television, called and asked if Stellify had anything to pitch to Netflix. Matthew and Kieran Doherty decided to pitch Flinch. A couple of weeks later, a ten-episode series was commissioned.

== Production ==
The show, like the original taster tape, was shot in a barn in Northern Ireland. Once the games were conceptualised, Stellify hired comic book artist P.J. Holden to storyboard them, primarily as a way of visually pitching the games to Netflix, but also as a guide when it came to shooting.

Talking about the production of the show, Kieran Doherty said: "The production crew were indefatigable. Our three hosts – Lloyd Griffith, Desiree Burch and Seann Walsh – were fantastic. And our cast of contributors were brilliant sports, even when we were torturing them for our own amusement."

== Promotion ==
The show's trailer was released by Netflix on 18 April 2019, alongside its promotional poster.

== Russian adaptation ==
In January 2022, Stellify Media announced a Russian adaptation of the show. It was distributed by Sony Pictures Television and was broadcast on the Russian television broadcaster STS, under the title Не дрогни (Ne drogni, Don't Flinch).
