= Freeze Frame (2004 film) =

2004 psychological thriller-mystery film by John Simpson

- Directed by: John Simpson
- Written by: John Simpson
- Produced by: Michael Casey
- Starring: Lee Evans; Sean McGinley; Ian McNeice; Colin Salmon; Rachael Stirling
- Cinematography: Mark Garret
- Edited by: Simon Thorne
- Music by: Debbie Wiseman
- Production company: Green Park Films
- Distributed by: Universal Pictures
- Release date: 18 June 2004
- Running time: 97 minutes
- Countries: United Kingdom; Ireland; United States
- Language: English
- Box office: $91,062

Freeze Frame is a psychological thriller-mystery film written and directed by John Simpson. In the lead role is the comedian Lee Evans. The film follows the story of Sean Veil (Evans), who becomes paranoid that there is a conspiracy against him after he is accused of a triple murder. He starts filming every moment of his life to provide himself an alibi. The film was rated "R" by the Motion Picture Association of America.

== Plot ==
In 1994, Sean Veil is acquitted of charges relating to an infamous triple murder. He becomes paranoid that the police are trying to frame him for this and other crimes. A book based on his trial called Darkness Invisible is released. The author, Saul Seger, accuses Veil. Veil responds by filming every moment of his life to provide himself with an alibi. However, some of his tapes go missing. Veil goes on the run, tries to create an alibi and investigates the conspiracy against him. Katie Carter, a young reporter, says she would like to help Veil prove his innocence but Veil refuses her offer.

Veil is assaulted and apprehended by police wishing to interrogate him. Veil shows detectives Emeric (who is dying of lung cancer) and Mountjoy the many tapes he has made. Emeric and Mountjoy leave but Veil finds one of his tapes is missing. Veil then becomes the prime suspect in the murder of a prostitute.

At the morgue, the prostitute's body is mysteriously replaced by that of Seger, who has had his throat cut. Veil is convicted and sentenced to 30 years' imprisonment. However, one of Veil's tapes proves his innocence and he is released. Veil returns home and is shocked to find Seger alive. Both Carter and Seger are guilty of serious crimes, for which they tried to frame Veil. Veil asks Seger who is trying to frame him but Seger refuses to say. In fact, Carter hired the prostitute to steal one of Veil's tapes and then killed her by accident. Carter's father killed his wife and family and then killed himself when he found his wife was having an affair. By coincidence, Veil was at the murder scene, leaving his fingerprints. Carter shoots Seger dead, then knocks Veil out. Waking up, Veil finds Carter raping him in order to frame him; she destroys his tapes afterwards. However, Carter finds herself feeling too guilty for her actions to kill Veil.

Emeric arrives at Veil's home. An altercation leaves both Emeric and Carter dead. Detective Mountjoy arrives. Veil shows him what happened as he has filmed the events on his webcam. Before the film ends, Veil makes a list of things to remember: whom to trust, how to be careful, how to be a step ahead, and how to prove one's innocence. He must never stop filming himself because being off camera is "like being off guard".

== Cast ==
- Lee Evans as Sean Veil
- Ian McNeice as Forensic Profiler Saul Serger
- Colin Salmon as Detective Mountjoy
- Seán McGinley as Detective Louis Emeric
- Rachael Stirling as Katie Carter
- Rachel O'Riordan as Mary Shaw
- Andrew Wilson as Covert Cameraman
- Andrea Grimason as Susan Jasper
- Martin McShary as Sam Jasper
- Gabriella Henriette as Moira Jasper
- Emily Anthony as Maggie Jasper
- Ryan McKenna as Reporter (Credit only)
- Hawk Younkins as Carter (uncredited)

== Production ==
The film was shot in Crumlin Road Jail in Belfast, Northern Ireland, on a budget of $2,000,000.

== Release ==
Freeze Frame was released on 18 June 2004. Box Office Mojo reports it earned $1,100 at the domestic box office and $38,570 in the UK. The Numbers reports a worldwide box office return of $91,062. It was released on DVD on 18 January 2005.

== Reception ==
Freeze Frame received five positive and one negative review among the six reviews collected by Rotten Tomatoes and a score of 55 out of 100 from Metacritic based on 5 reviews, signifying "mixed or average" reviews. Critical appreciation went to Evans who had previously played comedic roles. David Rooney of Variety said Simpson's direction was "executed in the style of early David Fincher" and said Evans' performance was "gripping". Debbie Wiseman's score, cinematographer Mark Garrett's choice of cameras and lenses and Simon Thorne's "sharp editing" were also mentioned. Kevin Crust of the Los Angeles Times wrote that Freeze Frame is a "stylish and dystopian allegory concerned with Orwellian surveillance and intrusive government". Crust called Evans' performance "riveting". Neil Smith of the BBC wrote that the film "starts off stylish and ingenious but becomes a disappointing hodgepodge of risible overacting and transparent plotting".

== See also ==
- List of films featuring surveillance
