= Ingrid Dahle =

Norwegian comedian and actress

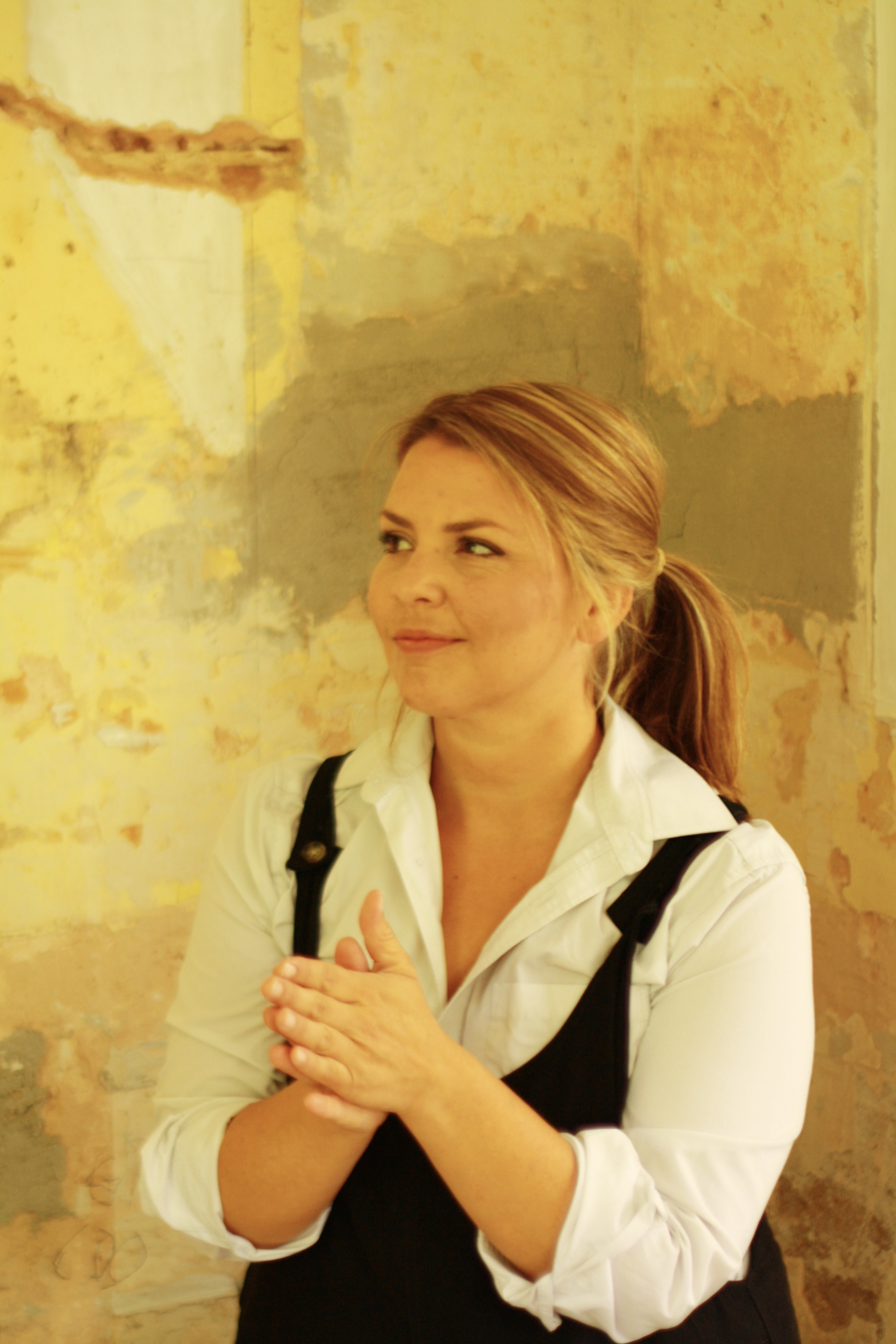
- Ingrid Dahle
- Born: Ingrid Elise Dahle; Stavanger, Norway
- Occupations: Comedian, actor, presenter, writer
- Years active: 2012 – present
- Children: 2

Ingrid Elise Dahle is a UK-based Norwegian comedian and actress.

== Early life ==
Dahle was born in Stavanger Norway, and grew up in Hommersåk.

== Comedy career ==
In 2012 she won the Brighton Comedy Festival inaugural 'Squawker Award', and thus performed at the Brighton Dome for the Best of the Fest. Dahle was nominated for the final of So You Think You're Funny? (SYTYF) in 2012. In 2015 she was runner up in Leicester Mercury Comedian of the Year.

Dahle is a supporter of many charities and performs at comedy fundraising events. She performed at Charity Chuckle, Komedia Brighton in 2012 and again in 2015 helping to raise funds for Stand Up To End Violence Against Women, and also the Young People's Centre Brighton. In 2019 Ingrid performed at Union Chapel London to fundraise for 'Bloody Good Period' which works towards ending period poverty for those who cannot afford essential products

In 2018, Dahle supported Jen Brister on her sixth UK tour 'Meaningless'. She was a supporting act on Desiree Burch October–November 2019 UK tour.

== Comedy festivals ==
- Brighton Fringe 2012, 2018, 2019
- Edinburgh Fringe 2013, 2016, 2018
- Green Man Festival 2017
- Wychwood Festival 2017
- Machynlleth Comedy Festival – 2017, 2018, 2019, 2020
- Fringe Theatrefest Barnstaple 2018, 2019, 2020

== Film and radio ==
Dahle played Esther, the lead character in Being Nice, a short comedy drama released 2015 directed by Leah Revivo. A socially inept factory girl (Esther) decides to try and fit in, but 'Being Nice' is never as simple as it sounds. Being Nice was accepted into 9 film festivals including: Royal Television Society – Student Awards, Screentest National Student Film Festival and LA Cinefest. The Monthly Film Festival guide reviewed it: 2.5 stars out of 3.

In 2017 her 'Mach-Fest diary' was presented for BBC Radio 4's Comedy Club at Machynlleth Comedy Festival.

== Awards and nominations ==
Year	Award	Category	Result
2012	Brighton Comedy Festival	Squawker Award	Won
2012	So You Think You're Funny	New Act	Nominated
2016	Screentest: The UK's National Student Film Festival	Best Performance: Being Nice	Won
2017	Leicester Comedy Festival	Leicester Mercury Comedian of the Year	Nominated

== Personal life ==
She resides in Brighton & Hove.
