= The World of Lee Evans =

British TV comedy (Channel 4, 1995)

- The official DVD cover of the original VHS video artwork.
- Created by: Lee Evans
- Developed by: Lee Evans
- Starring: Lee Evans
- Opening theme: Lee Evans
- Ending theme: Lee Evans
- Country of origin: United Kingdom
- Original language: English
- No. of series: 1
- No. of episodes: 4

Production
- Executive producer: Andy Harries
- Producers: Miles Ross; Matthew Leys
- Camera setup: Multiple
- Running time: 30 minutes approx.
- Production company: Granada Television

Original release
- Network: Channel 4
- Release: 2 June – 23 June 1995

Related
- So What Now?

The World of Lee Evans is a BAFTA-nominated television comedy series written by and starring Lee Evans. It was produced by Granada Television for Channel 4 and aired four episodes (featuring two stories each) in June 1995. Channel 4 announced that The World of Lee Evans was officially cancelled after the first series.

The series followed Lee around getting stuck in tight situations - its humour, which differs greatly from Evans' later stand-up material, contains many elements of slapstick, and the show is similar in style to Mr. Bean. It won a cult following but has received a very mixed reception in retrospect with some critics and fans comparing it unfavourably to his other work.

The series' slogan is If Lee Evans needs to get from A to B, he starts at Z....

== Episodes ==
- "The Late Night Shift"/"Meet the Folks" (2 June 1995)
  - In "The Late Night Shift", Evans works his first nightshift in a 24-hour garage, though he has problems with his first customer. Evans has problems delivering him a packet of crisps, a drink's can and a cassette tape.
  - In "Meet the Folks", Lee Evans believes he has arrived at his girlfriend's house, though whilst she is getting ready to see Evans, he must occupy his time making a good image of himself for her parents. Unfortunately, Evans embarrasses himself, and it turns out eventually he has visited the wrong house.
- "Off the Rails" (9 June 1995)
  - In "Off the Rails" (Part One): Lee Evans and his girlfriend Jo travel on a "hotel train" heading to Edinburgh. However, as the train wobbles, havoc erupts.
  - In "Off the Rails" (Part Two): Jo almost breaks up with Evans due to her believing that he doesn't understand her.
- "One Late Night" (16 June 1995)
  - In "One Late Night" (Part One): Lee Evans takes a trip in a car he is selling at his outdoor showroom. During the journey, he picks up a mysterious hitch hiker. They both hear a BBC Radio announcement on the car radio about a criminal who has escaped from prison and was hitchhiking.
  - In "One Late Night" (Part Two): As both Lee Evans and the hitch hiker both heard the BBC report, Evans starts to believe that the hitch hiker is the criminal, whilst the hitch hiker thinks Evans in the criminal, and thus act closely aware of each other.
- "Mr Confidence"/"Special Delivery" (23 June 1995)
  - In "Mr Confidence", Lee Evans puts on an LP of a man giving instructions to Evans on how to impress his next door neighbour. However, Evans cannot hold up the act up for very long.
  - In "Special Delivery", a friend of Evans' is giving birth and Evans tries to find things to do to occupy his time in the hospital whilst he awaits the birth.
