= Barking in Essex =

Play by Clive Exton

- Written by: Clive Exton
- Genre: Comedy

Premiere
- Date: 16 September 2013
- Place: Wyndham's Theatre

Barking in Essex is a black comedy directed by Harry Burton. It is based on the 2005 script by Clive Exton, and made its world premiere at the Wyndham's Theatre in September 2013.

== Production history ==
Barking in Essex was written by Clive Exton in 2005, but never performed prior to his death in 2007. In November 2012, it was announced that the play would be performed for the first time in September 2013, for a limited run until 4 January 2014. The UK premiere was produced by MJE Productions, Theatre Royal Haymarket Productions and James Quaife Productions. The play was directed by Harry Burton, design by Simon Higlett, lighting by James Farncombe, sound by Gareth Owen and casting by Anne Vosser. Cast rehearsals began on 5 August and the show opened on 16 September 2013, at Wyndham's Theatre following previews from 6 September. The play's cast included Lee Evans, Sheila Hancock, Keeley Hawes, Montserrat Lombard and Karl Johnson. The play marked Evans's first stage appearance since the 2007 revival of the play The Dumb Waiter. Shortly before Christmas, Hawes left the play prematurely and was replaced by her understudy Rachel Marwood.

== Synopsis ==
Algie Packer has been in prison for seven years for committing bank robbery and it is the day of his release. There is only one problem; his mother Emmie and his sister-in-law Chrissie have spent the proceeds of the robbery on luxury items, like around the world cruises and blue Ferraris. What follows is a comedy of errors as the Packer family try to cover their tracks and go on the run, involving a lawyer, the street hit-man and a pair of maracas.

== Principal roles and original cast ==
Character	Original West End performer
Darnley Packer	Lee Evans
Emmie Packer	Sheila Hancock
Chrissie Packer	Keeley Hawes
Allegra Tennyson	Montserrat Lombard
Rocco	Karl Johnson

== Reception ==
Reviews for the production were mixed. Charles Spencer in The Daily Telegraph wrote: "Wonderfully funny. Imagine a cross between Mike Leigh's Abigail's Party and Quentin Tarantino's Reservoir Dogs … not a show that will appeal to everyone, but those who like their comedy black, blue, and raucous will have a ball." Simon Edge in The Daily Express wrote: "It has the depth of an extended sitcom and not every gag works. However the cast are uniformly strong and it is profane good fun that had me cheerfully guffawing."

Some however were more negative and Michael Billington in The Guardian wrote: "As a piece of black comedy, Clive Exton's play is neither sufficiently dark nor consistently funny." Henry Hitchings of the London Evening Standard wrote: "While Harry Burton’s production has moments of vitality it can’t make up for the weakness of the writing. It felt a terrible waste of a strong cast."

== Awards and nominations ==
=== London production ===
Year	Award	Category	Result
2013	Evening Standard Award	Best Night Out	Nominated
2014	Whatsonstage.com Awards	Best New Comedy	Nominated
