= So What Now? =

- The official DVD cover for the Lee Evans' series "So What Now".
- Created by: Lee Evans
- Developed by: Lee Evans; Stuart Silver; Peter Tilbury
- Directed by: Tony Dow
- Starring: Lee Evans; Steven O'Donnell; Sophie Thompson
- Country of origin: United Kingdom
- Original language: English
- No. of series: 1
- No. of episodes: 8

Production
- Executive producers: Addison Cresswell; Geoffrey Perkins
- Producers: Tony Dow; Charlie Hansen
- Camera setup: Multiple
- Running time: 30 minutes

Original release
- Network: BBC One
- Release: 26 March – 22 May 2001

Related
- The World of Lee Evans

So What Now? is a British television sitcom which aired on BBC One. It stars and created by Lee Evans, who also wrote the show with Stuart Silver and Peter Tilbury. The series was broadcast from 26 March 2001 to 22 May 2001. BBC announced that So What Now was cancelled after the first series.

== Plot ==
The series centres on Lee sharing a house with his slobbish best friend and their neurotic landlady.

== Cast and characters ==
=== Main ===
- Lee Evans, as himself, a barely employed musician and everything he touches seems to turn to disaster. He does write tunes for mobile phone ringtones and has a son, Lucas, with his now estranged wife, Eileen.
- Steven O'Donnell as Stuart Ponder, Lee's slobbish and disorganised best friend. He allows Lee to stay in his flat against his better judgement and soon regrets his decision. He is a double glazing window salesman, is married to Wendy and has children with her.
- Sophie Thompson as Heather Ollerenshaw, Lee and Stuart's fiercely neurotic landlady. She appears desperate to find a man, while also being a failed "IT" girl. Her father is in prison for embezzlement.

== Episodes ==
No.	Title	Directed by	Written by	Original release date
1	"Moving Out"	Tony Dow	Lee Evans, Stuart Silver and Peter Tilbury	26 March 2001
After being thrown out by wife, Eileen, and burning down his friend's flat, Lee must find a new place to live.
2	"Sofa So Good"	Tony Dow	Lee Evans, Stuart Silver and Peter Tilbury	2 April 2001
Having misplaced Eileen's wedding ring, Lee enthusiastically searches through the innards of Heather's sofa in an attempt to find it. But it's no trouble - he took woodwork at school.
3	"Swingers"	Tony Dow	Lee Evans and Stuart Silver	9 April 2001
Stuart thinks that Lee needs to get back on the scene. After a date - surprisingly - doesn't go to plan, Heather also finds herself abruptly single; the trio head to a 'classy' lapdancing club to search for someone special.
4	"The House Guest"	Tony Dow	Lee Evans, Stuart Silver and Peter Tilbury	23 April 2001
Following an unfortunate incident with an elderly man in the street, Lee and Stuart decide it best to nurse him for a couple of days. Predictably, the innocent old fellow is not quite what he seems. Note: This episode was originally due to air on 2 April 2001 but was postponed.
5	"Act of God"	Tony Dow	Lee Evans, Stuart Silver and Peter Tilbury	30 April 2001
Stuart tries to get Lee to take out a life insurance policy, but his motives are unclear.
6	"Fear of Flying"	Tony Dow	Lee Evans, Stuart Silver and Peter Tilbury	7 May 2001
The friends have the chance to take a holiday but Lee's fear of flying could be a problem.
7	"The Limo"	Tony Dow	Lee Evans, Stuart Silver and Peter Tilbury	15 May 2001
Lee and his friends come unstuck in a limo.
8	"Parole"	Tony Dow	Lee Evans, Stuart Silver and Peter Tilbury	22 May 2001
Heather's father has been released on parole but Lee is uncertain as to whether he can be trusted.

== DVD release ==
The series was made available on DVD on 12 November 2001 in a two-disc set, with bonus features including 30 minutes of outtakes and a documentary on Lee Evans.
