= Mouse Hunt =

1997 black comedy film by Gore Verbinski

- Theatrical release poster
- Directed by: Gore Verbinski
- Written by: Adam Rifkin
- Produced by: Bruce Cohen; Tony Ludwig; Alan Riche
- Starring: Nathan Lane; Lee Evans; Vicki Lewis; Maury Chaykin; William Hickey; Christopher Walken
- Cinematography: Phedon Papamichael
- Edited by: Craig Wood
- Music by: Alan Silvestri
- Distributed by: DreamWorks Pictures
- Release date: December 19, 1997 (United States)
- Running time: 97 minutes
- Country: United States
- Language: English
- Budget: $38 million
- Box office: $125.4 million

Mouse Hunt is a 1997 American slapstick black comedy film written by Adam Rifkin and directed by Gore Verbinski in his feature film directorial debut. It stars Nathan Lane, Lee Evans, Vicki Lewis, Maury Chaykin, William Hickey, and Christopher Walken. The film follows two Laurel and Hardy-like brothers in their struggle against one small but crafty house mouse for possession of a mansion which was willed to them by their father. While the film is set in the late 20th century, styles range humorously from the 1940s to the 1990s.

It used real live mice, along with occasional computer-generated imagery and animatronic robot mice, and was the first family film to be released by DreamWorks Pictures. They released it in the United States on December 19, 1997, to mixed reviews, but it was a commercial success, earning $125.4 million on the box office against a budget of $38 million. The film features one of William Hickey's final roles. The film was dedicated to his memory.

== Plot ==
String magnate Rudolph Smuntz dies, bequeathing his financially cash-strapped factory and a dilapidated Victorian mansion to his sons Ernie and Lars. Following the will reading, both brothers suffer setbacks in their lives—Ernie, who shunned the family business to become a chef, accidentally loses his restaurant when a cockroach hidden in a box of cigars he inherited from his father's estate contaminates a meal he is serving to the mayor, causing the mayor to suffer a fatal heart attack, while Lars is thrown out by his greedy wife April, after he honored a promise to his late father to refuse letting a rival company, Zeppco International, buy the factory. Lars and Ernie reunite in a diner and learn of each other's misfortunes, leading them to spend the night in the mansion they inherited.

The brothers find themselves unable to sleep because of a mouse making noise, but in trying to catch him, they discover blueprints of the property. Through these, they discover the mansion was built in 1876 and is a fabled missing design by the architect Charles Lyle LaRue and would be worth a fortune if restored. Alexander Falko, a wealthy collector of LaRue artifacts, offers to buy the mansion, but they decide to auction the mansion, thinking it would be more profitable. Later that night, Ernie spots the mouse and informs Lars they must get rid of him, fearing a repeat of the cockroach incident. Several attempts are made, but the mouse, proving to be remarkably intelligent, manages to outwit them every time.

Their situation becomes further complicated when Ernie borrows against the house to pay for renovations and the bank threatens to evict them in two days, unless they resume mortgage payments. After the factory workers go on strike upon learning they cannot be paid when Lars attempts to run operations on his own, Ernie goes behind his back to secretly meet the Zeppco representatives over their buyout offer upon finding the business card they left. The meeting fails to happen after he is hit by a bus while flirting with some women but is surprised when Lars reveals April will provide the cash, having learnt of the brothers' recent discovery. After more failed attempts to kill the mouse, including adopting a vicious Maine coon named Catzilla and hiring an exterminator named Caesar, the brothers overhear a voicemail message from Zeppco withdrawing their offer, leading them to argue against each other. Their argument unwittingly leads to Lars throwing an orange at Ernie but instead hitting the mouse. Unable to finish it off, the brothers decide to mail him in a box to Cuba to be rid of it.

Ernie and Lars reconcile, and finish renovating the house for auction. However, on the night it is to begin, Lars discovers the box had been mailed back due to insufficient postage and realizes that the mouse is back in the house. As the auction gets underway, the brothers attempt to flush the mouse out with a garden hose but fail miserably when their actions cause the house to be flooded, washing everyone outside, before the mansion collapses. April leaves with a wealthy bidder, and the brothers, having lost everything again, spend the night in the factory. The mouse, surviving the collapse, follows them, whereupon it takes pity on their situation and uses the factory machinery to convert a block of cheese into a ball of string cheese. Inspired, the brothers end their war with the mouse, renovating the factory to produce string cheese, with Lars managing the business, while also now in a relationship with Hilde and Ernie managing the products. As a token of gratitude, they hire the little mouse to be their official taste tester and spokesperson.

== Cast ==
- Nathan Lane as Ernest 'Ernie' Smuntz, a man who refused heirdom to his father's string factory to become a chef.
- Lee Evans as Lars Smuntz, Ernie's younger brother and the heir to their father's string factory.
- Vicki Lewis as April Smuntz, Lars' gold-digging former wife.
- Maury Chaykin as Alexander Falko, a wealthy LaRue collector.
- William Hickey as Rudolf Smuntz, a string magnate and the late father of Ernie and Lars.
- Christopher Walken as Caesar, an odd and eccentric exterminator hired by the Smuntz brothers to rid them of the mouse.
- Eric Christmas as Ernie and Lars' lawyer. This was Christmas' final acting performance before he died on July 22, 2000.
- Camilla Søeberg as Hilde, the Bench Lady
- Debra Christofferson as Ingrid
- Michael Jeter as Quincy Thorpe, a LaRue historian.
- Ian Abercrombie as the auctioneer.
- Annabelle Gurwitch as Roxanne Atkins, a photographer.
- Eric Poppick as Theodore Plumb, the banker.
- Ernie Sabella as Maury, a worker at the cat shelter.
- Cliff Emmich as Mayor McKrinkle.
- Susan Blommaert as Ms. Park Avenue
- Carmen Filpi as Pallbearer #4
- Jack Angeles as Kennel Employee
- Thom Barry as a doctor (scenes deleted)
- Sarah Dampf as a crying girl

== Production ==
=== Background ===
The film was the third overall release by DreamWorks Pictures; after political thriller The Peacemaker, released in September 1997, and historical drama Amistad, released earlier in December 1997. Two years after first forming as a company, DreamWorks had no live-action films in production, which was a serious concern for financiers. DreamWorks' original goal was to have three movies released by the end of 1996, but a variety of factors delayed the company. Among them were co-founder Steven Spielberg's commitment to fulfilling all his outside obligations, including directing The Lost World: Jurassic Park, a film which wasn't tied to DreamWorks. Spielberg's workload around that time was more than his DreamWorks colleagues had expected. The initial live-action scripts DreamWorks had in development were The Peacemaker, Amistad, Mouse Hunt and family film Paulie (which wasn't released until April 1998). The company's animation division DreamWorks Animation was handled more closely by co-founder Jeffrey Katzenberg, and also had two films in development, Antz and The Prince of Egypt. Both of these animated films wouldn't be released until 1998, partly due to the long nature of animated film production. Among the initial live-action scripts in development, The Peacemaker was the one that was closest to shooting readiness. In a 1997 interview with the Los Angeles Times, Katzenberg said competition in the live-action arena made it more difficult to put films together. He pointed out that during the last three years, studios went from making 110 to 120 movies a year to 160 to 170, and conceded that with DreamWorks' movie operation it had "gone a little bit slower in terms of how long it's taken for the development.”

Mouse Hunt's script was written by Adam Rifkin and it was directed by Gore Verbinski in his feature directorial debut. Verbinski was then known for his work on commercials, such as the 1995 Budweiser Frogs campaign that aired during Super Bowl XXIX. He was chosen by Spielberg, who also chose first time feature director Mimi Leder to direct The Peacemaker. Rifkin and Verbinski were both inspired by Coen Brothers films like The Hudsucker Proxy, as well as Terry Gilliam's Brazil. Verbinski was insistent that the film stay faithful to Rifkin's original script, with Rifkin saying in 2023 that Verbinski wanted the film "to be dystopian and in its own universe of weirdness". Rifkin described he and Verbinski as being a perfect match, and said that Spielberg trusted them to both carry out the vision they saw for the movie.

=== Casting and filming ===
Mouse Hunt would be shot between March 3 and July 3, 1997, in various locations across California. It was shot around the same time as Amistad, which Spielberg directed on the east coast of the United States. Verbinski played a role in selecting cast members for Mouse Hunt. One of the film's actors, William Hickey, died on June 29, 1997, just days before shooting wrapped.

The outdoor scenes have depictions of snow and the majority of them were shot in Central and Northern California, particularly around Fresno and the Yosemite region. Wilshire Boulevard in Beverly Hills was used for exterior shots representing the upscale restaurant. Additionally, Raleigh Studios in Hollywood was where many of the mansion's interior shots were constructed and filmed. In a 1997 interview, Verbinski said that the flood scene towards the end of the film was a collaborative effort between special effects leader Michael Lantieri and the film's stunt team. In this same interview, Verbinski reflected on the shooting, saying that "we weren't anywhere near anything sane during the entire shooting of the movie. Especially with Nathan and Lee, they sort of promote insanity."

==== Mice casting ====
Verbinski sought real mice for the film since this realism contrasted with the absurd nature of the film's two leads. The casting process for the mice was detailed in a December 1997 news article titled "Mouse Hunt: Hollywood's hunt for the perfect set of... ears". Regarding the ideal type of mouse he wanted, Verbinski said in this article "I did not want a cigar-smoking, bow-tied mouse. I wanted a really harmless kind of mouse. A lot of mice are too beady-eyed, too ratlike." Verbinski eventually turned to professional animal trainer Boone Narr to find the right mouse for the film. Narr presented various mice based on color and size specifications, and Verbinski selected two that closely matched his vision — though he requested a lighter underbelly to better evoke the image of a "church mouse" with expressive charm. According to Narr, Verbinski sought a mouse that could not only perform but also connect emotionally with audiences. To fulfill this unique casting challenge, Narr turned to online outreach, posting a call for mice fitting Verbinski's precise criteria. The search yielded an overwhelming response — with over 8,000 submissions, which Narr jokingly referred to as 'rodent head shots'.

Of the initial group of mice evaluated, four met the casting requirements, far fewer than needed for the production. To realistically film Mouse Hunt, Verbinski required a total of 60 mice: one principal mouse for close-ups and nuanced scenes, and 59 to perform various stunt and action sequences. Narr addressed this challenge by breeding the two mice initially selected by Verbinski, ultimately creating a colony of sixty. From this group, one standout mouse was chosen for leading scenes. Meanwhile, the rest underwent specialized training, organized into teams based on their abilities — including running, climbing, and jumping — to fulfill their respective roles during filming. Narr taught them intricate stunts, including curling up in a sardine can bed. A CGI mouse by Rhythm & Hues Studios was used sparingly, mostly for stunts too complex or dangerous for real animals. An animatronic robot mouse built by Stan Winston Studio was also used for some close-ups and expressive moments. It had remote-controlled facial features and internal bladders to simulate breathing. Scenes involving the vicious cat named "Catzilla" were done using a similarly realistic Animatronic robot cat.

==== Mice filming ====
Verbinski described the most difficult aspect of the film's production as being the logistics of filming the mice. It required a second unit running simultaneously to the work with the human actors. During early tests with the live mice, there was an entire day of shooting where the crew wasn't able to get a single usable shot. These early tests concerned the crew and made them realize how much time they would need to spend on the mouse scenes. While shooting, they sometimes would need up to 130 takes to get the mice to do what they were required to do. This number is only 18 takes less than the official record listed in The Guinness Book of World Records, which was for a scene in the 1980 film The Shining. Verbinski said in 1997 "unlike with the actors, who I encourage improvisation, the mouse, if he improvises, that means he walks out of the shot. That was kind of crazy to sort of [say to the mouse] 'No it has to be like this', and then come over and [say to the actors] 'that was interesting'. This was organic and [the other] was surgical and very strict."

== Music ==
Mouse Hunt (Original Motion Picture Soundtrack)

Soundtrack album by Alan Silvestri
- Released: December 2, 1997 (original release); July 7, 2023 (deluxe edition)
- Recorded: 1997
- Genre: Film score
- Length: 29:18 (original release); 60:45 (deluxe edition)
- Label: Varèse Sarabande

Alan Silvestri chronology
Contact (Music from the Motion Picture) (1997)	Mouse Hunt (Original Motion Picture Soundtrack) (1997)	The Parent Trap (1998)

Professional ratings
Review scores
Source	Rating
AllMusic	3/5 stars

On December 2, 1997, Alan Silvestri's background score was released on a CD titled Mouse Hunt (Original Motion Picture Soundtrack). This release was handled by Varèse Sarabande, a label specializing in background score albums for films. DreamWorks' two other inaugural releases from 1997, The Peacemaker and Amistad, both had their background score albums released by the company's own record label DreamWorks Records. DreamWorks' label was mainly focused on rock and pop artists rather than film albums, and from 1998 onward only ever released a handful of film score albums.

On July 7, 2023, Varèse Sarabande released an expanded deluxe edition of the original CD. This version was limited to 2,000 copies, and released in association with Paramount Pictures (whose logo is on the back of the album), as Paramount gained control of the live-action DreamWorks library in 2006. Paramount hold full control over Mouse Hunt's music, unlike with some of the live-action scores released on DreamWorks Records, which Universal Music Group now control certain rights to, due to Universal Music Group's purchase of DreamWorks Records in 2003.

=== Track listing ===
==== Original edition (1997) ====
No.	Title	Length
1.	"Main Title"	2:40
2.	"Funeral Prologue"	1:15
3.	"Chez Ernie"	1:07
4.	"Dying Wish"	1:35
5.	"Charles Lyle Larue"	0:43
6.	"What Are You Doing?"	1:36
7.	"Nailgun"	0:54
8.	"Hot Tuboggan"	0:51
9.	"Cherry Catapult"	1:32
10.	"Ernie Finds the Contract"	1:44
11.	"Silent Movie"	1:06
12.	"Caesar's Big Drag"	2:00
13.	"Shotgun Chase"	1:25
14.	"Insufficient Postage"	1:17
15.	"Flaming Doo"	1:46
16.	"String Cheese"	2:11
17.	"End Credits"	5:36
Total length:		27:01

==== Deluxe edition (2023) ====
No.	Title	Music	Length
1.	"Funeral Prologue"		1:19
2.	"Main Title"		2:24
3.	"Also, a House"		0:41
4.	"Chez Ernie"		0:38
5.	"Lobster Biblioteque"		0:37
6.	"Walking Crouton / Love the Almonds"		1:05
7.	"Dying Wish"		1:46
8.	"Out on the Street"		0:37
9.	"Together Again"		1:24
10.	"I'll Be Home for Christmas"	Kim Gannon, Walter Kent	0:42
11.	"Home Sweet Dump"		1:27
12.	"Meet the Mouse"		2:21
13.	"Charles Lyle LaRue"		0:47
14.	"Falko / Ten Million Dollars"		0:31
15.	"All Thru the House / Setting the Trap / Clang!"		1:31
16.	"Mouse"		0:55
17.	"Cheese Wheel"		2:06
18.	"Nail Gun"		1:12
19.	"Hot Tubbogan"		0:53
20.	"Mousetrap Minefield"		1:13
21.	"Cherry Catapult / Cherry Spin"		2:09
22.	"Shit Explosion"		1:37
23.	"City Pound / Catzilla"		1:42
24.	"Catzilla Emerges / Ebony and Ivory"		0:56
25.	"Ernie Finds Contract"		1:47
26.	"Cat Trap / Roach Mobile"		1:39
27.	"You’re the Intruder"		0:47
28.	"Loose Thread"		0:56
29.	"Cesar Searches / Evidence Found Calcium Deficiency"		0:44
30.	"Silent Movie"		1:12
31.	"Lars au Natural / Caesar’s Big Drag"		2:30
32.	"Face Walk / Caesar’s Truck"		1:02
33.	"Sandwich to Go / Ernie Settles in / Ouch!"		2:49
34.	"Shotgun Chase"		1:29
35.	"Floor Collapse / Hate That Mouse"		0:40
36.	"Brotherly Betrayal / I Hate You"		0:39
37.	"Insufficient Postage"		1:20
38.	"Return to Sender / Mouse on Podium"		0:32
39.	"There He Is!"		1:28
40.	"Flaming Doo"		1:48
41.	"Water Pressure"		2:42
42.	"LaRue Ruins / Sad Drive / Factory Brothers"		2:07
43.	"String Cheese"		2:17
44.	"End Credits"		5:41
Total length:			54:29

== Release ==
Mouse Hunt was released in North America on December 19, 1997, and opened in the #4 spot behind Titanic, Tomorrow Never Dies and Scream 2. It was initially scheduled to be released on Christmas Day 1997, but would end up being released six days earlier. The film was released in the United Kingdom on April 3, 1998, and opened at #2, behind Titanic.

=== Promotion ===
In November 1997, DreamWorks partnered with FreeZone, a youth-focused online platform, to create interactive websites for three of its upcoming films: Mouse Hunt, Paulie, and Small Soldiers. Small Soldiers began shooting that same month and wasn't released until July 1998, while Paulie had already finished shooting the previous month and was in post-production at that time. The collaboration was intended to serve as an online promotional campaign, with each film receiving its own dedicated site featuring games, film clips, and contests. The website for Mouse Hunt, the first of the three to launch, included an option for users to create and send virtual postcards and participate in chat rooms with the cast and special effects experts. FreeZone was a subsidiary of Thomson Target Media at the time, and its partnership with DreamWorks was praised by DreamWorks' head of field promotions, Michael Vollman, who cited FreeZone's ability to "do some real special stuff" that his own team couldn't. In December 1997, an interactive multimedia press kit was also released for Mouse Hunt. Neither Mouse Hunt nor Paulie would have any video game tie-in by DreamWorks Interactive, which ended up mainly releasing non-DreamWorks related video games. However, DreamWorks Interactive did make two separate PC and PlayStation video game tie-ins for Small Soldiers. The interactive division of DreamWorks was initially intended to be a major component of their business, but by the time Mouse Hunt was released, it was considered less important.

=== Home media ===
Mouse Hunt was released on VHS on May 5, 1998, and DVD on December 8, 1998, by DreamWorks Home Entertainment. It also received a U.S. LaserDisc release on August 3, 1999, as well as receiving a Malaysian VCD release in 2000.

On December 11, 2007, a 2-disc double feature DVD was released, which included Mouse Hunt and the 1998 DreamWorks film Paulie. A 2008 Australian Region 4 version of this release also exists, along with a 2007 Danish Region 2 version. On April 10, 2009, Paramount Japan released Mouse Hunt on DVD in that country. In 2013, Paramount Home Entertainment released an Australian Region 4 DVD which bundled Mouse Hunt together with four other films; Paulie, The Indian in the Cupboard (a Paramount Pictures film), Imagine That (another Paramount Pictures film) and Lemony Snicket's A Series of Unfortunate Events (a film co-released by DreamWorks and Paramount in 2004).

Paramount Home Entertainment later released it on Blu-ray on February 2, 2021. A 4K Ultra HD edition of the film was released by Kino Lorber on June 26, 2025, under license from Paramount. It has been made available on Paramount's subscription streaming service Paramount+, as well as on its free streaming service Pluto TV. In Australia, it was also on the streaming service for the Paramount-owned broadcaster Network 10.

=== Television airings ===
Mouse Hunt premiered on the Time Warner cable channel Cartoon Network in March 2007, as part of its "March Movie Madness" lineup. It would continue to have numerous airings on Cartoon Network through to 2009. During this time, it did not air on Cartoon Network's rival cable channel Nickelodeon, despite it being owned by Viacom/Paramount, the company that had recently acquired the rights to Mouse Hunt in 2006.

== Reception ==
=== Box office ===
The film was a box-office success, partially due to its release during the Christmas and New Year's holiday period. It grossed $6,062,922 in its opening weekend, averaging $2,817 from 2,152 theaters and ranking #4 behind Titanic, Tomorrow Never Dies and Scream 2. In its second weekend, it stayed at #4 and increased by 60 percent, making $9,702,770, averaging $4,428 from 2,191 theaters, and bringing its 10-day gross to $21,505,569. In its third weekend, it once again stayed at #4 and dropped by only 13 percent, making $8,418,001, averaging $3,804 from 2,213 theaters, and bringing its 17-day gross to $40,021,527. It closed on July 1, 1998, with a final gross of $61,917,389 in the North American market and $60,500,000 in other territories for a worldwide total of $122,417,389.

=== Critical response ===
Mouse Hunt received mixed reviews from film critics. Rotten Tomatoes reports that 50% of 38 critics had given the film a positive review. The critics consensus reads: "Even with some vivaciously archaic mugging from its two leads, Mouse Hunt gets trapped under the weight of its excessive slapstick antics." On Metacritic, the film has a score of 54 out of 100 based on reviews from 21 critics, indicating "mixed or average reviews". Audiences polled by CinemaScore gave the film an average grade of "B" on an A+ to F scale.

Roger Ebert gave the film a negative review in December 1997, calling it "not very funny, and maybe couldn't have been very funny no matter what, because the pieces for comedy are not in place... A comedy that hasn't assigned sympathy to some characters and made others hateful cannot expect to get many laughs, because the audience doesn't know who to laugh at, or with." His colleague Gene Siskel disagreed and liked the film.

In her review, Janet Maslin of The New York Times declared it "the family film least insulting to its audience's intelligence this season", adding that it "has some grown-up appeal along with enough mouse mischief to have children giggling." Maslin noted that "the violence is good-humored and non-scary, but there are a couple of absolutely needless sexual references." Lisa Alspector of the Chicago Reader had a negative view of the wide age range appeal, calling it a "desperately all-ages movie [that] just emphasizes its banality by throwing money and effort into effects and production design at the expense of pacing." Ken Fox of TV Guide considered the cinematography of the film to be a "technical marvel", adding that "the many chases through rooms, under floors and behind walls — including one very scary encounter with a nail-gun — are all done to jaw-dropping, state-of-the-art perfection."

Paul Malcolm of the LA Weekly considered the film's charm to "lie in its surprisingly dark atmosphere and its almost subversive sense of humor." Joe Leydon of Variety said in December 1997 that Adam Rifkin's script was "clever", adding "the most special effect in Mouse Hunt is the well-timed give-and-take between the top billed human stars. Lane mixes sharp tongued sarcasm and self satisfied fussiness to create a character who echoes Oliver Hardy and, occasionally, Groucho Marx [and] together, the two leads bring out the best, and the funniest, in each other." Leydon also commented on the performance of the mice, saying that in one escape scene a mouse "looks very much like a panicky bit player trapped below deck in Titanic." In December 1997, Marc Savlov of The Austin Chronicle gave it three and a half out of five stars, calling it a "dark and energetic" comedy. Savlov viewed the concept of the film to be a dig at Disney, since the villain was a mouse and DreamWorks co-founder Jeffrey Katzenberg used to work for Disney.

== See also ==
- List of American films of 1997
