= Lloyd Griffith =

English comedian, actor, presenter and singer

- Born: Grimsby, Lincolnshire, England
- Occupations: Television presenter; comedian; actor; chorister
- Years active: 2010–present
- Known for: Soccer AM; 8 Out of 10 Cats; Ted Lasso; Return to Paradise

Lloyd Griffith is an English comedian, actor, presenter and singer from Grimsby, England, and was a presenter on Sky Sports show Soccer AM until the end of the 2018–19 season.

== Career ==
Lloyd Griffith originally trained as a classical choral singer at the University of Exeter before becoming a comedian in 2010. He started in stand-up comedy before starring in comedy short Inheritance and on the BBC Radio 1 Comedy Lounge in 2014. Prior to 2019, Griffith performed as tour support for Rob Beckett and Jack Whitehall.

Griffith started his TV career on BBC Three show Taxi to Training in which he would interview professional footballers (such as Troy Deeney, Asmir Begovic and Dele Alli) as he drove them to their respective training grounds. He also appeared on BBC, Sky TV and Comedy Central shows including Drunk History, Rugby's Funniest Moments, and Sweat the Small Stuff. Griffith has recently made frequent appearances on Comedy Central Live at The Comedy Store, Comedy Central's Roast Battle and E4's 8 out of 10 Cats. He also had a small recurring part in the NBC comedy Ted Lasso. Recent acting credits have included Not Going Out, It's a Sin, and Bounty Hunters. He was announced as a new host of Soccer AM, when he replaced Helen Chamberlain for the 2017–18 run of the show. Griffith left the show in July 2019, before the start of the 2019–20 run. In 2019, Griffith served as a host of Flinch, a physical gameshow for Netflix, alongside Seann Walsh, and Desiree Burch. He also presented a documentary on BBC2 called Can You Beat the Bookies?, unpacking how difficult it is to turn a profit gambling, to critical acclaim.

Outside of stand-up comedy and his television work, Griffith is also well known for his YouTube series Premier League Fan Reactions with the weekly videos regularly reaching upwards of 100K views. Until 2019, the series was hosted on the YouTube channel "The Football Republic" where he would often appear in other videos alongside fellow comedian Rhys James. Griffith hosted a one-off 23 minute long show called Quest for the Best made by EA Sports for Sky Sports featuring Lionel Messi, Ryan Giggs, Gary Neville, Adebayo Akinfenwa and Carles Rexach.

Following the death of Queen Elizabeth II, Griffith performed God Save the King at Blundell Park prior to the 13 September 2022 EFL League Two fixture Grimsby Town vs Gillingham, and on 18 September 2022 at the Brentford Community Stadium before that day's Premier League fixture Brentford vs Arsenal.

In 2023, Griffith supported Jack Whitehall as part of a multi location stand-up comedy tour in advance of his own 2024 set.

In 2024, Griffith was part of the main cast of the 2024 Australian detective dramedy Return to Paradise.

Griffith was nominated for a silver Logie award at the 2025 ceremony.

== Personal life ==
Griffith is a keen football fan of his home town team Grimsby Town. On occasion, he does commentary on some of their games for BBC Radio Humberside.

Griffith was a chorister at Grimsby Minster and then read music at the University of Exeter where he was also a choral scholar in the Exeter Cathedral choir. He has featured a number of times on Songs of Praise. Griffith still sings professionally and can be seen singing as a deputy in the choirs of St George's Chapel, Windsor Castle and Westminster Abbey. His favourite classical composer is Thomas Tallis and his favourite venue to sing in is the Mary Harris Memorial Chapel of the Holy Trinity, part of the University of Exeter where Griffith studied.

== Filmography ==
=== Film ===
Year	Title	Role	Distributor	Notes
2021	Infinite	Brasserie Chef Joe	Paramount+	
2021	Paul Dood's Deadly Lunch Break	Simon	Sky Cinema	
2022	The People We Hate at the Wedding	PC Fox	Amazon Prime Video	

=== Television ===
Acting roles
Year	Title	Role	Channel	Notes
2017	Drunk History	Various	Comedy Central	Series 3; Episodes 7 & 8
2017	Bounty Hunters	Betting Shop Cashier	Sky One	Series 1; Episode 1
2020–2023	Ted Lasso	Lloyd	Apple TV+	Recurring role; Series 1–3; 14 episodes
2021	Not Going Out	Gareth	BBC One	Series 11; Episode 2: "Pub Quiz"
2021	It's a Sin	Estate Agent	Channel 4	Mini-series; Episode 4
2021	Whitstable Pearl	Bowling Alley Manager	Acorn TV	Series 1; Episode 6: "The Man on the Blue Plaque"
2022	Sneakerhead	Mystery Shopper	Dave	Series 1; Episode 1
2023	Bad Education	Flinty	BBC Three	Series 4; Episode 3: "Prison"
2023	Everyone Else Burns	Elder Simeon	Channel 4	Series 1; Episode 6
2023	Nolly	Paul Henry	ITVX	Mini-series; Episodes 1 & 2
2023	A Whole Lifetime with Jamie Demetriou	Brian the Milkman	Netflix	Series 1; Episode 1
2023	Brassic	Performer	Sky Max	Series 6; Episode: "A Very Brassic Christmas"
2023	The Outlaws	Nigel	BBC One	Series 3; Episode 5
2024–present	Return to Paradise	Det. Snr. Cons. Colin Cartwright	ABC TV	Main role; Series 1, 2 & 3
2025	Suspect: The Shooting of Jean Charles de Menezes	Alan Bixel	Disney+	2 episodes: "The Whistleblower" & "The Verdict"

Presenting and Guest Appearances
Year	Title	Role	Channel	Notes
2014	Sweat the Small Stuff	Self	BBC Three	Series 3; Episodes 3 & 9
2016–2018	The Premier League Show	Reporter / Guest / Host	BBC Two	Series 1–3; 39 episodes
2017–2023	Soccer AM	Presenter	Sky Sports	Series 21–23 & 27; 68 episodes
2019	FL!NCH	Presenter	Netflix	Series 1; Episodes 1–10
2019	8 Out of 10 Cats	Guest Panellist	E4	Series 21; Episode 5
2019	CelebAbility	Guest Panellist	ITV2	Series 3; Episode 5
2019	Can You Beat the Bookies?	Presenter	BBC2	Television documentary
2019	Roast Battle	Contestant	Comedy Central	Series 3; Episode 5
2020	Comedy Game Night	Self	Comedy Central	Series 1; Episode 9
2020	Jonathan Ross' Comedy Club	Self	ITV	Series 1; Episode 3
2020	The Stand-Up Sketch Show	Self	ITV	Series 2; Episode 4
2020	The Lock Inn Pub Quiz	Contestant	YouTube	Series 1; Episode 9
2020	Richard Osman's House of Games	Contestant	BBC Two	Series 4; Episodes 46–50 (Week 10)
2021	Pointless Celebrities	Contestant	BBC One	Series 14; Episode 3: "Stand-Up Comedy"
2021	Rob Beckett's Undeniable	Guest Panellist	Comedy Central	Series 1; Episode 3
2021	Between the Covers	Guest Panellist	BBC Two	Series 3; Episode 6
2022	A Question of Sport	Contestant	BBC One	Series 51; Episode 25
2022	Obsessed with... Peaky Blinders	Host	BBC Sounds	Television Special
2023	Live at the Apollo	Special Guest	BBC Two	Series 18; Episode 7: "Christmas Special"
2024	All Town Aren't We	Self	Amazon Prime Video	Football documentary series; Episodes 1–3
2025	Celebrity Mastermind	Contestant	BBC One	Series 23; Episode 9
2025	Celebrity Antiques Road Trip	Guest	BBC One	Series 13; Episode 14: "Lloyd Griffith v Rhys James"
2025	The 1% Club	Contestant	ITV	Series 4; Episode 16: "Soccer Aid Special"
