= The Jonathan Ross Show =

British chat show

- Genre: Comedy; Chat show
- Written by: Jonathan Ross; Shaun Pye; Fraser Steele; Dawson Bros. (series 1–5); Christine Rose (series 1–5); Dan Swimer (series 1–5); Jez Stevenson (series 2–); Lee Stuart Evans (series 5–)
- Directed by: Chris Howe
- Presented by: Jonathan Ross
- Theme music composer: Mark Ronson
- Country of origin: United Kingdom
- Original language: English
- No. of series: 23
- No. of episodes: 252 (list of episodes)

Production
- Executive producers: Lee Connolly; Deborah Cox (series 1–4); Addison Cresswell (series 1–5); Bea Ballard (series 5–); Luke Ellis; David Najar (series 6–)
- Producers: Pete Pitwood (series 5–8); Dan Wickens (series 9–)
- Production locations: The London Studios (series 1–11); Television Centre (series 12–); BBC Elstree Centre (series 14, 17)
- Editors: Steve Andrews; Mark Redfern (series 2–)
- Production companies: Hotsauce TV; ITV Studios

Original release
- Network: ITV
- Release: 3 September 2011 – present

Related
- Friday Night with Jonathan Ross

The Jonathan Ross Show is a British comedy chat show presented by Jonathan Ross. It was first broadcast on ITV on 3 September 2011 and airs on Saturday evenings. It began following the conclusion of Ross's BBC One chat show, Friday Night with Jonathan Ross, in July 2010.

== Production ==
For its first 11 series, the show was filmed at The London Studios, except for one episode in 2013, which was filmed at Television Centre. In November 2011, it was announced that Ross had signed a new two-year contract to host another two series of 10 episodes and a Christmas special. A year later, the show was renewed for a fourth series to air in 2013. In March 2013, Ross bemoaned his declining ratings due to a poor selection of guests, as some top celebrities seemed to prefer the atmosphere of The Graham Norton Show. He also confirmed that series 4 had been extended and that he had signed to present one more series of 30 episodes. In July 2013, despite previous announcements that the show would end in late 2013, ITV commissioned two more series to air in 2014.

In May 2014, Ross stated that, as of the seventh series, the programme would be given a "shake-up" to its format to keep it fresh. On 20 October 2014, ITV announced that Ross had signed a new contract to continue his show until the end of 2015, which would consist of two series and a Christmas special. ITV's Director of Entertainment and Comedy, Elaine Bedell, said: "Jonathan is the king of talk shows and a valued member of the ITV family. He continues to attract the biggest names in showbiz onto his sofa and I am delighted that he will remain on the channel until at least the end of 2015."

After much rumour and speculation over the future of the programme, ITV and representatives for Ross confirmed that the show had not been axed and would return for its 11th series in the autumn of 2016, which would also include a Christmas special. However, unlike previous series, there would be no episodes continuing into the new year of 2017, as Ross took a break to travel to the US. ITV's Director of Television, Kevin Lygo, said: "Jonathan Ross is very important to ITV and we look forward to the new series this autumn and the Christmas special and working with him again next year when the chat show returns in Autumn 2017".

It was announced in May 2017 that production of the show would move from The London Studios to the newly refurbished Studio TC1 at Television Centre in West London.

Series 18 began on 23 October 2021.

Series 19 commenced in the autumn of 2022 and was the first series since 2019 to feature the regular studio set once again. During 2020 and 2021, the set design had to be changed due to the Covid 19 pandemic, when social distancing measures had to be put into place. However Series 19 saw the return of the regular set, with guests once again waiting in the "green room" and being seated close together on the couch. Only Jonathan's desk has not returned, with Jonathan now hosting from a separate chair.

== Episodes ==
The Jonathan Ross Show has broadcast twenty series since its debut in 2011.

Series	Episodes	Originally released	
Series	Episodes	First released	Last released
1	9	3 September 2011	23 December 2011
2	12	7 January 2012	24 March 2012
3	14	18 August 2012	22 December 2012
4	20	5 January 2013	18 May 2013
5	11	12 October 2013	28 December 2013
6	10	4 January 2014	8 March 2014
7	10	18 October 2014	20 December 2014
8	11	24 January 2015	4 April 2015
9	11	17 October 2015	26 December 2015
10	13	9 January 2016	2 April 2016
11	11	10 September 2016	10 December 2016
12	12	2 September 2017	18 November 2017
13	15	1 September 2018	22 December 2018
14	10	2 March 2019	4 May 2019
15	15	14 September 2019	24 December 2019
16	11	17 October 2020	24 December 2020
17	8	10 April 2021	29 May 2021
18	9	23 October 2021	18 December 2021
19	9	15 October 2022	31 December 2022
20	7	25 February 2023	8 April 2023
21	7	17 February 2024	13 April 2024
22	8	15 February 2025	19 April 2025
23	8	7 February 2026	11 April 2026

== International broadcasts ==
- Australia – Series 1 started airing on ABC1 from 9 September 2011 and the subsequent Christmas special screened on 24 December 2011. Series 2 began on 14 January 2012. Subsequent series have aired on Foxtel’s UKTV Channel usually 2 months behind UK broadcast.
- New Zealand – Series 1 started airing on TV One from 16 September 2011 and the third series began on ChoiceTV from December 2012. The subsequent Christmas special screened on 30 December 2011.
- Sweden – Series 1 started airing on SVT1 from 15 October 2011, from episode 6. Series 2 began on 14 January 2012.
- Ireland – In 2014, the show began airing on the Irish television channel 3e, a sister channel of Ireland's major independent channel TV3, the day after UK transmission on 3e. From 24 January 2015 until January 2017, the show aired on UTV Ireland at the same time as the ITV broadcast on Saturday nights. When UTV Ireland closed, the show then went back to Virgin Media One and Virgin Media Two
- United States – As of December 2014, the show airs Saturday nights on the Cinémoi cable channel.

== See also ==
- Friday Night with Jonathan Ross
