= Monsters Tour =

2014 comedy tour by Lee Evans

- Tour by Lee Evans
- Start date: 18 August 2014
- End date: 30 November 2014
- Legs: 1
- No. of shows: 65

Lee Evans concert chronology
- Roadrunner Tour (2011); Monsters Tour (2014)

The Monsters Tour was the final comedy tour of the British comedian Lee Evans. The tour visited Bournemouth, Brighton, Nottingham, Sheffield, Birmingham, London, Manchester, Glasgow, Leeds, Aberdeen, Liverpool, Newcastle upon Tyne, Dublin, Belfast and Cardiff. Tickets went on sale in late May 2013. The tour followed a fairly similar route to Evans' 2011 Roadrunner Tour. A live DVD was recorded at the NIA, Birmingham, on Saturday 20 September, and Evans received a standing ovation following the finale. On 20 November Evans announced the tour to be his last ever, subsequently announcing his retirement from comedy.

== Tour dates ==
Date	City	Country	Venue
18 August 2014	Bournemouth	England	Bournemouth International Centre
19 August 2014	Bournemouth	England	Bournemouth International Centre
20 August 2014	Bournemouth	England	Bournemouth International Centre
21 August 2014	Bournemouth	England	Bournemouth International Centre
22 August 2014	Bournemouth	England	Bournemouth International Centre
23 August 2014	Bournemouth	England	Bournemouth International Centre
24 August 2014	Bournemouth	England	Bournemouth International Centre
26 August 2014	Brighton	England	Brighton Centre
27 August 2014	Brighton	England	Brighton Centre
28 August 2014	Brighton	England	Brighton Centre
29 August 2014	Brighton	England	Brighton Centre
30 August 2014	Brighton	England	Brighton Centre
31 August 2014	Brighton	England	Brighton Centre
1 September 2014	Brighton	England	Brighton Centre
4 September 2014	Nottingham	England	Capital FM Arena Nottingham
5 September 2014	Nottingham	England	Capital FM Arena Nottingham
6 September 2014	Nottingham	England	Capital FM Arena Nottingham
7 September 2014	Nottingham	England	Capital FM Arena Nottingham
8 September 2014	Nottingham	England	Capital FM Arena Nottingham
11 September 2014	Sheffield	England	Motorpoint Arena Sheffield
12 September 2014	Sheffield	England	Motorpoint Arena Sheffield
13 September 2014	Sheffield	England	Motorpoint Arena Sheffield
17 September 2014	Birmingham	England	National Indoor Arena
18 September 2014	Birmingham	England	National Indoor Arena
19 September 2014	Birmingham	England	National Indoor Arena
20 September 2014	Birmingham	England	National Indoor Arena
21 September 2014	Birmingham	England	National Indoor Arena
25 September 2014	London	England	The O_{2} Arena
26 September 2014	London	England	The O_{2} Arena
27 September 2014	London	England	The O_{2} Arena
2 October 2014	London	England	The O_{2} Arena
3 October 2014	London	England	The O_{2} Arena
4 October 2014	London	England	The O_{2} Arena
9 October 2014	Manchester	England	Manchester Arena
10 October 2014	Manchester	England	Manchester Arena
11 October 2014	Manchester	England	Manchester Arena
12 October 2014	Manchester	England	Manchester Arena
16 October 2014	Glasgow	Scotland	The SSE Hydro
17 October 2014	Glasgow	Scotland	The SSE Hydro
18 October 2014	Glasgow	Scotland	The SSE Hydro
24 October 2014	Leeds	England	First Direct Arena
25 October 2014	Leeds	England	First Direct Arena
27 October 2014	Aberdeen	Scotland	Aberdeen Exhibition and Conference Centre
28 October 2014	Aberdeen	Scotland	Aberdeen Exhibition and Conference Centre
30 October 2014	Liverpool	England	Echo Arena Liverpool
31 October 2014	Liverpool	England	Echo Arena Liverpool
1 November 2014	Liverpool	England	Echo Arena Liverpool
6 November 2014	Newcastle	England	Metro Radio Arena
7 November 2014	Newcastle	England	Metro Radio Arena
8 November 2014	Newcastle	England	Metro Radio Arena
11 November 2014	Dublin	Ireland	3Arena
12 November 2014	Dublin	Ireland	3Arena
14 November 2014	Belfast	Northern Ireland	Odyssey Arena
15 November 2014	Belfast	Northern Ireland	Odyssey Arena
19 November 2014	London	England	Wembley Arena
20 November 2014	London	England	Wembley Arena
21 November 2014	London	England	Wembley Arena
22 November 2014	London	England	Wembley Arena
24 November 2014	Cardiff	Wales	Motorpoint Arena Cardiff
25 November 2014	Cardiff	Wales	Motorpoint Arena Cardiff
26 November 2014	Cardiff	Wales	Motorpoint Arena Cardiff
27 November 2014	Cardiff	Wales	Motorpoint Arena Cardiff
28 November 2014	Cardiff	Wales	Motorpoint Arena Cardiff
29 November 2014	Cardiff	Wales	Motorpoint Arena Cardiff
30 November 2014	Cardiff	Wales	Motorpoint Arena Cardiff
