= Desiree Burch =

American comedian (born 1979)

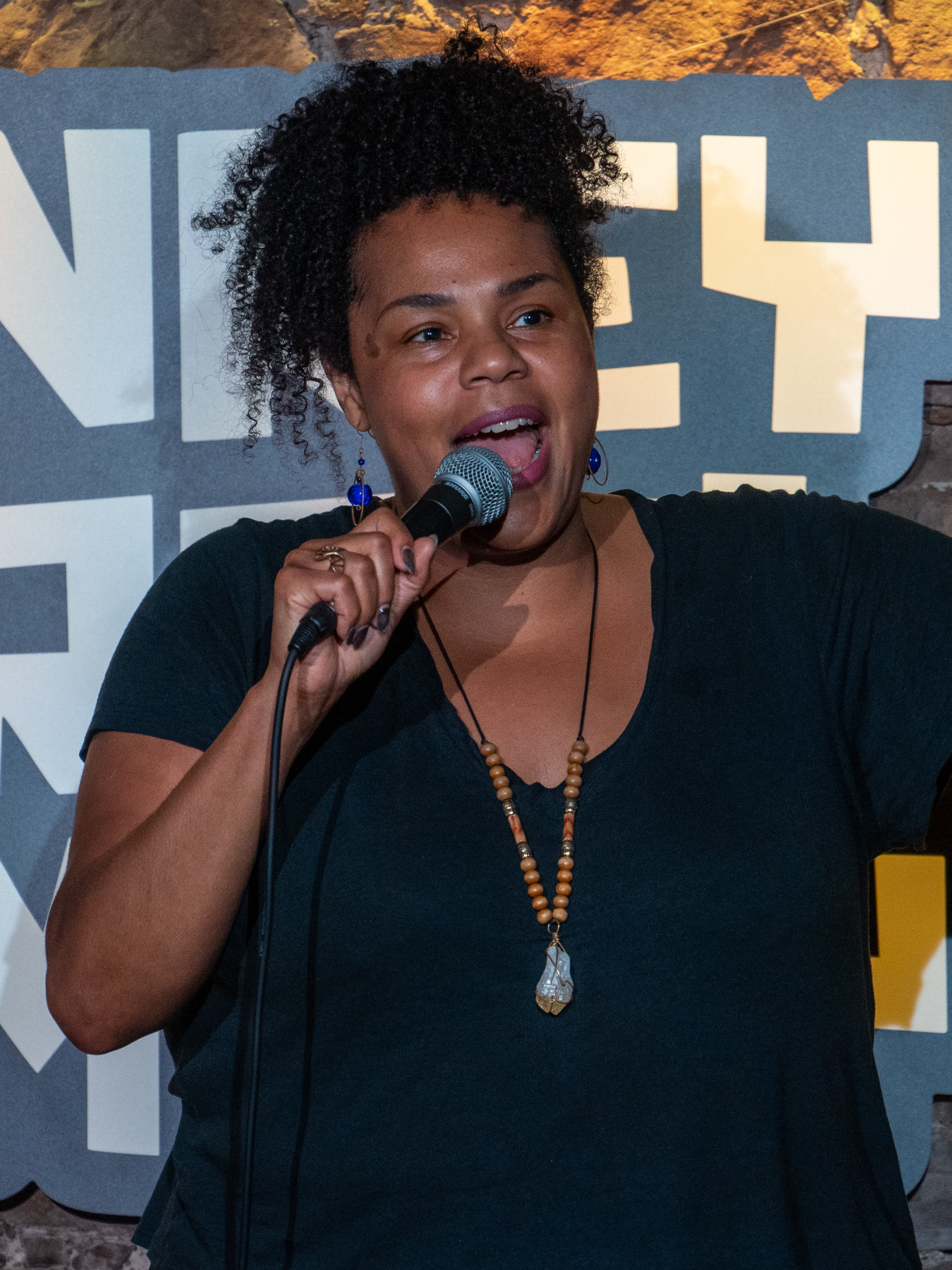
- Burch at the 2025 Edinburgh Festival Fringe
- Born: Desiree Lea Burch; Diamond Bar, California, U.S.
- Education: Yale University (BA)
- Occupations: Comedian, actress, television presenter, voice actress
- Years active: 2005–Present
- Known for: Flinch; Too Hot to Handle
- Notable work: Neo-Futurists
- Website: desireeburch.net

Desiree Lea Burch is an American comedian, actress, television presenter and voice actress. Originally from Diamond Bar, California, Burch has also lived in New York and London.

She won the Funny Women title in 2015 having completed an arduous series of gigs around the UK. She followed up this success with five-star reviews and a Fringe First Award for her one-woman, self-written show, Tar Baby at the 2015 Edinburgh Fringe Festival.

== Early life and education ==
Burch was born in Diamond Bar, California and attended Yale University where she earned a bachelor's degree majoring in Theatre Studies. After university, she moved to New York City where she became a founding member of the New York Neo-Futurists, and performed regularly as a stand-up comedian and actress on the New York comedy circuit.

In 2014 she moved to London, where she achieved wider acclaim in television following her win in the annual Funny Women competition in the following year, and Fringe First Award for her self written, one-woman show, Tar Baby. She later became the founding Artistic Director of Degenerate Fox Theatre with Kate Jones.

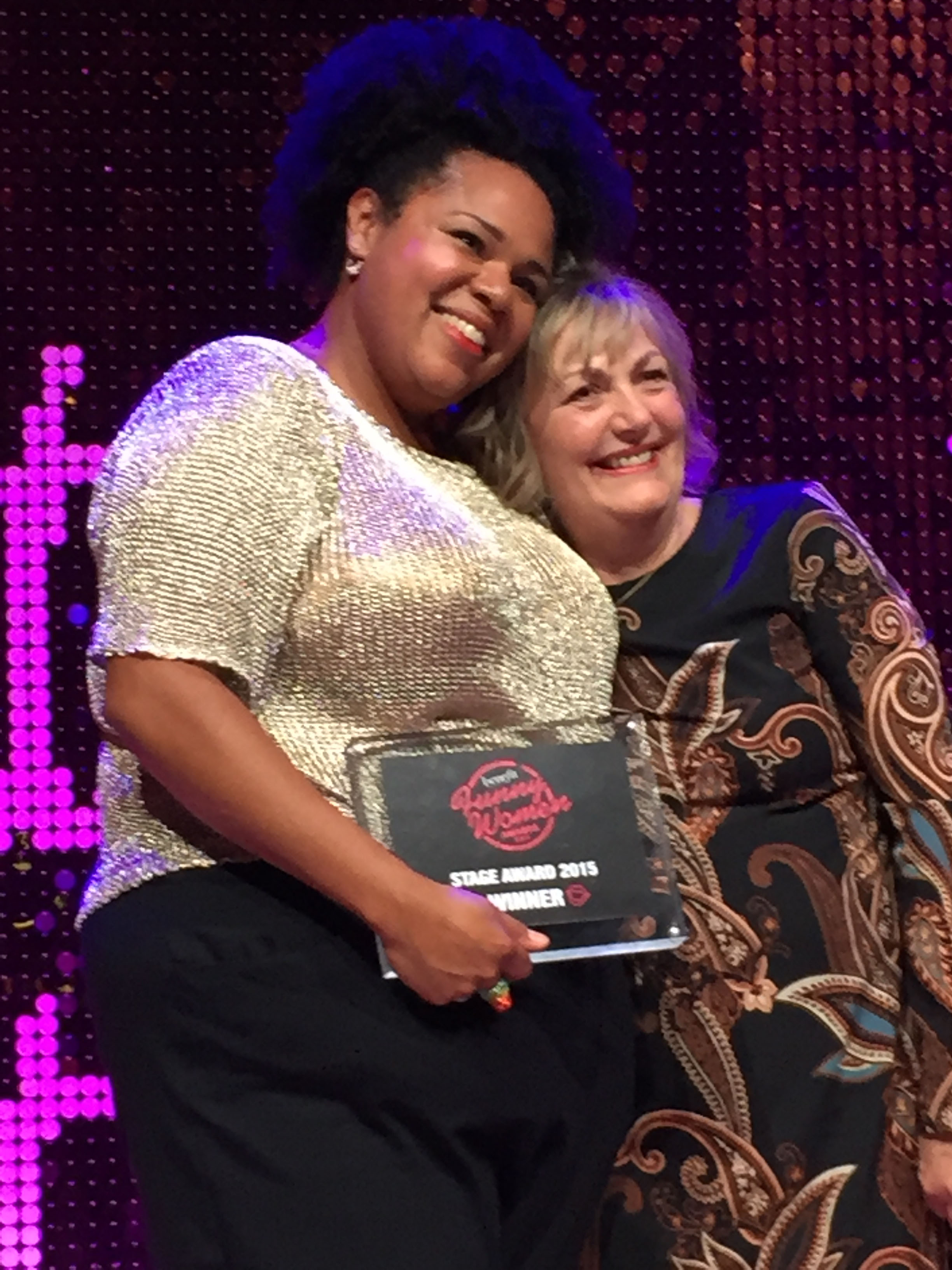
Burch (left) accepting the Funny Women 2015 Award

== Career ==
Burch has appeared on Live at the Apollo, Have I Got News for You, QI, The Mash Report, The Russell Howard Hour, The Fake News Show, Chris Ramsey's Stand Up Central, Frankie Boyle's New World Order, Mock the Week, American Autopsy, Richard Osman's House of Games and Would I Lie to You?. She also plays Pamela Winchell, the former Mayor of Night Vale and current Head of Emergency Press Conferences, in Welcome to Night Vale. In 2021, Desiree Burch was set to co-star with Arnold Schwarzenegger in the Kartoon Channel series Superhero Kindergarten. Later that same year, she was in the Netflix movie A Castle for Christmas starring Brooke Shields and Cary Elwes.

Burch hosts Flinch, a physical game show on Netflix, alongside Seann Walsh and Lloyd Griffith, which debuted in May 2019.

Desiree's Coming Early was a 31-date UK tour in October and November 2019 with support from comedian Ingrid Dahle.

In 2020, she became the narrator for Netflix's reality television dating show Too Hot to Handle.

In May 2020 Burch appeared as a contestant in BBC’s I'll Get This, in which participants play games during dinner to avoid paying the bill. In January 2021 she was a contestant on the BBC Best Home Cook show. Burch appeared on Series 12 of Channel 4's Taskmaster as a contestant.

== Personal life ==
Burch is bisexual. She moved to London because of her English boyfriend at the time, and found the comedy scene in London to be more welcoming than New York's. Within London, she has lived in Streatham, Croydon and Peckham.
