= Lee Evans (comedian) =

English comedian, actor, musician, and writer (born 1964)

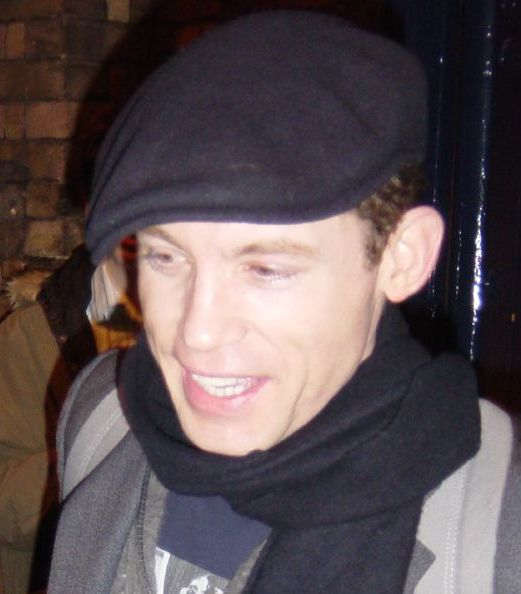
- Evans in 2004
- Born: Lee John Martin Evans; 25 February 1964 (age 62); Bristol, England
- Occupations: Comedian; actor; musician; singer; writer
- Years active: 1994–2014, 2017–present
- Spouse: Heather Nudds (m. 1984)
- Children: 1

Lee John Martin Evans (born 25 February 1964) is an English former comedian, actor, musician, singer, and writer. He co-founded the production company Little Mo Films with Addison Cresswell, who was also his agent prior to Cresswell's death in December 2013. Evans became one of the United Kingdom's most popular stand-up comedians, with his Roadrunner tour grossing £12.9 million.

He made his cinema debut with the Peter Chelsom comedy Funny Bones (1995), earning the Paris Film Festival Award for Best Actor, and went on to appear in the Hollywood films The Fifth Element (1997), Mouse Hunt (1997), There's Something About Mary (1998), The Ladies Man (2000), and The Medallion (2003). He lent his voice to Zipeau the Troodon in the Emmy-nominated miniseries Dinotopia (2002) and made a notable departure from comedy with a leading role in the Irish thriller film Freeze Frame (2004).

In 2008, the DVD of Evans's Big – Live at the O2 show became the highest-selling Christmas DVD in the United Kingdom, only to be surpassed by his own Monsters Tour DVD in 2014. In November 2014, he announced his retirement from stand-up comedy. In 2017, he briefly came out of retirement to star in a run of William Shakespeare and Harold Pinter plays. Evans is also a singer and musician, as shown on his arena tours; he can play the guitar, bass guitar, keyboards, piano, turntables, mandolin, ukulele, and drums.

== Early life ==
Lee John Martin Evans was born in the Avonmouth suburb of Bristol on 25 February 1964, to Irish mother Shirley Hunt and Welsh father Dave Evans (died June 2019). He has an older brother. His father was a comedian, musician and impressionist. The family left Bristol in 1975, moving to Essex, where Evans attended The Billericay School. After a spell as a boxer and two years at Thurrock Art College in Essex, he followed his father into entertainment. During his teenage years, he moved to Scarborough, North Yorkshire, where he was a drummer in a punk rock band called the Forgotten Five.

== Career ==
=== Stand-up comedy ===
Evans rose to fame during the 1990s with his energetic stage performances and physical observational comedy. His slapstick humour has led to comparisons with Norman Wisdom, though Evans does not regard Wisdom as an influence. In 1993, he won the Perrier Comedy Award for his work at the Edinburgh Festival.

Evans's sweat drenches him on stage. During most of his headlining performances, he often takes an intermission, during which he has a quick shower and changes into a different suit. He has also said that his suits are regularly thrown away after three performances, mainly because of the sweat, with dry-cleaners refusing to handle them. In November 2005, Evans broke the world record for a solo act performing to the biggest comedy audience, performing to 10,108 people at the Manchester Arena.

Evans toured the UK in autumn 2008 with his stand-up act entitled "Big". During his "Big" tour he performed in front of over 500,000 people on 59 dates. This was scheduled to involve the first-ever performance by a comedian at the O2 Arena in London until Chris Rock announced dates that would take place at the venue prior to Evans. The DVD was filmed at the O2 Arena, and was released on 24 November 2008. It became the best-selling comedy DVD in the UK for Christmas 2008, selling over 1,000,000 copies. Evans appeared on the Channel 4's Comedy Gala for Great Ormond Street Hospital on 30 March 2010. He was the last act on stage and he received a comedy award and auctioned it to the audience for charity.

Evans toured the UK again in 2011 with a new stand-up act entitled "Roadrunner", with 50 dates starting in Bournemouth in August, running until November in Cardiff. He appeared at the Wyvern Theatre, Swindon, on 10 June to test his new material for the "Roadrunner" tour. He then sold out Bristol's Colston Hall for three nights to perfect his routine in July. The tour visited most of the UK's major cities, plus two nights in Dublin, and included four nights in Wembley Arena and four in the O2 Arena, meaning around 100,000 seats in London alone. Tickets went on sale 15 October 2010 at 9 am.

Evans sold £7 million worth of tickets the first day they went on sale. Due to popular demand, there were a further 17 dates added to the tour in the Bournemouth International Centre, Brighton Centre, Motorpoint Arena Nottingham, Wembley Arena, the National Indoor Arena, The O2 London, Liverpool Arena, Motorpoint Arena Cardiff, Odyssey Complex Belfast and The O2 Dublin. This brought the tour up to 67 dates in 14 cities which is eight more than the record-breaking tour of 2008. In 2010, Evans received an Honorary Doctorate of the Arts at the University of East London's graduation ceremony. In 2011, he was honoured by the British Comedy Awards with the Channel 4 Award for Special Contribution to Comedy. In November 2014, Evans announced on The Jonathan Ross Show that he was retiring from stand-up comedy to spend more time with his wife and daughter.

=== Acting ===
Evans has made a number of film appearances, such as in Funny Bones, Mouse Hunt, There's Something About Mary (where he played an American posing as British), The Fifth Element, The Ladies Man, The Martins, The Medallion and Undertaking Betty. Evans provided the voice for Zippo in the 2002 TV miniseries Dinotopia and Train in the 2005 film The Magic Roundabout. From 1993 to 1994, Evans appeared in the Channel 4 late-night show Viva Cabaret!, both as a host and as a guest performer. In 1995, he starred in Channel 4 series, The World of Lee Evans.

In 2004, he starred as a paranoid murder suspect in his first non-comic role in the film Freeze Frame. Although warned they may never grow back, he shaved his eyebrows (as well as his hair). In 2004, Evans appeared in Samuel Beckett's Endgame, and from 2004 to 2005, he played Leo Bloom in the London production of The Producers along with Nathan Lane, with whom he also starred in Mouse Hunt. For his role in The Producers, Evans received a nomination for the Laurence Olivier Award for Best Actor in a Musical; Lane won the award. In 2007 he appeared in the 50th anniversary production of The Dumb Waiter. May 2007 saw him star in a television adaptation of the book The History of Mr. Polly.

Evans appeared as Malcolm Taylor, a Welsh scientist, in the 2009 Doctor Who Easter special "Planet of the Dead". Between September 2013 and January 2014, Evans starred in the play Barking in Essex at London's Wyndham's Theatre. In October 2017, Lee Evans came out of retirement to perform scenes from Shakespeare's plays in a one-off fundraiser along with Jack Whitehall in the play "Whither Would You Go?" at the Harold Pinter Theatre.

=== Writing ===
In 2001, he co-wrote and starred in the sitcom So What Now? for the BBC; eight episodes were written in total. He also has his own production company that produces his stand-up DVDs called Little Mo Films, named after his daughter, whom he often refers as "Little Mo".

== Personal life ==
Evans met Heather Nudds when they were both 16; they were married on 22 September 1984, and live in Billericay, Essex. They have a daughter.

== Tours ==
=== Tour dates ===
Year	Title	Shows
1996	Different Planet Tour	116
1998	Don't Try This at Home	100
2002	Wired and Wonderful	121
2005	XL	29
2008	Big	59
2011	Roadrunner	67
2014	Monsters	65

=== Box office score data ===
Venue	City	Tickets sold / available	Gross revenue
Roadrunner
The O_{2} Arena	London	88,037 / 93,432 (94%)	£4,119,760
Manchester Arena	Manchester	53,391 / 54,558 (98%)	£2,567,080
The O_{2}	Dublin	17,733 / 17,733 (100%)	£861,649
TOTAL		159,161 / 165,723 (97%)	£7,548,489

=== VHS/DVD releases ===
Year	Title	Venue
1994	Live at Her Majesty's Theatre	Her Majesty's Theatre, London
1995	Live From The West End	Lyric Theatre, London
1996	Live – Different Planet Tour	Lyric Theatre, London
1998	Live in Scotland	Playhouse Theatre, Edinburgh
2002	Wired And Wonderful – Live at Wembley	Wembley Arena, London
2005	XL Tour – Live	International Arena, Cardiff
2008	Big – Live at the O2	The O2 Arena, London
2011	Roadrunner – Live at the O2	The O2 Arena, London
2014	Monsters – Live	Barclaycard Arena, Birmingham

== Filmography ==
=== Television ===
Year	Title	Role	Notes
1995	The World of Lee Evans	Himself	Writer
1997	Brooms	Can man	
1998	Clair de Lune	Pete	Series Rik Mayall Presents
2001	So What Now?	Himself	Writer
2002	Dinotopia	Zipeau (a Troodon)	Voice
2007	The History of Mr Polly	Alfred Polly	
2007	The Dinner Party	Leo	
2009	Doctor Who	Dr. Malcolm Taylor	Episode: "Planet of the Dead"
2011	Alan Carr: Chatty Man	Himself	Series 7, Episode 5
2018	The Graham Norton Show	Himself	Series 24, Episode 6

=== Film ===
Year	Title	Role	Notes
1995	Funny Bones	Jack Parker	Film debut
1997	The Fifth Element	Fog	
1997	Mouse Hunt	Lars Smuntz	
1998	There's Something About Mary	Tucker / Norm Phipps	
2000	The Ladies Man	Barney	
2001	The Martins	Robert Martin	
2002	Plots with a View (a.k.a. Undertaking Betty)	Delbert Butterfield	
2003	Stealing Bess	Toady	
2003	The Medallion	Arthur Watson	
2004	Freeze Frame	Sean Veil	
2005	The Magic Roundabout	Train	Voice

=== Stage ===
Year	Title	Role
2004	Endgame	Clov
2004–2005	The Producers	Leo Bloom
2007	The Dumb Waiter	Gus
2013–2014	Barking in Essex	Darnley Packer
2017	Whither Would You Go?	Various Roles
2018	Pinter Three	Various Roles

== Accolades and awards ==
Awarding Body/Event	Awarded
British Comedy Award	2011 Outstanding Contribution to Comedy
Whats on Stage Awards	2008 Best Supporting Actor for The Dumb Waiter
Paris Film Festival	1995 Best Actor for Funny Bones
Edinburgh Comedy Award	1993 Perrier Award
Time Out Comedy Awards	1992 for Achievement in Comedy
