= British Academy Television Award for Best Entertainment Performance =

Film award

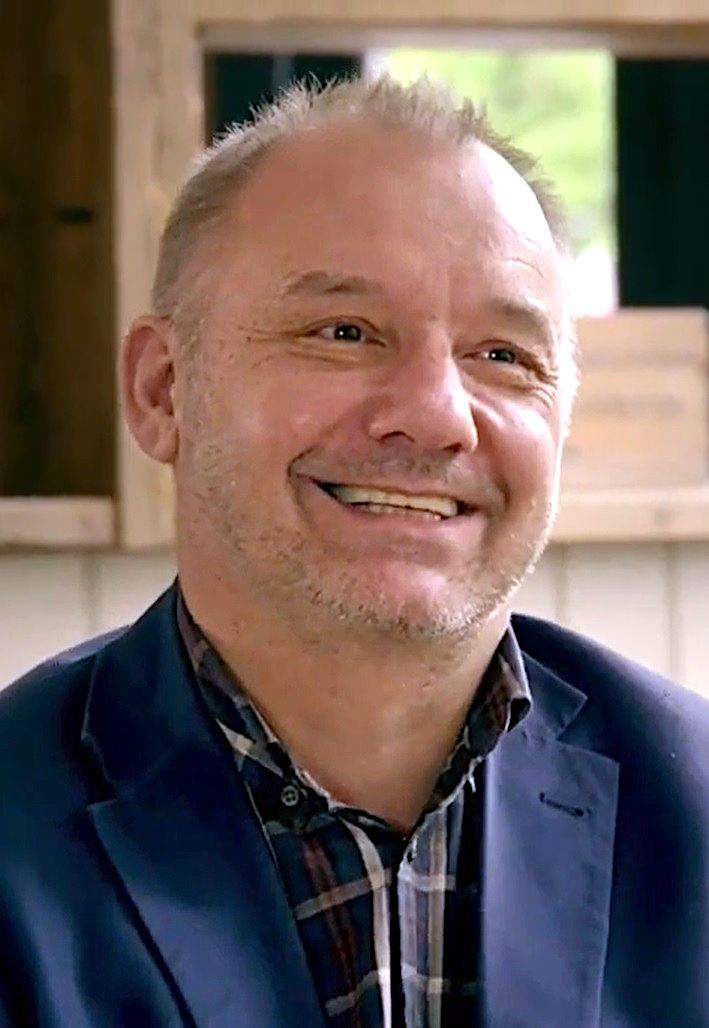
- 2026 Recipient: Bob Mortimer
- Country: United Kingdom
- Presented by: British Academy of Film and Television Arts
- First award: 1969 (presented in 1970)
- Currently held by: Bob Mortimer for LOL: Last One Laughing UK (2026)

Highlights
- Most wins: Graham Norton (6)
- Website: http://www.bafta.org/

The British Academy Television Award for Best Entertainment Performance is an award given out by the British Academy of Film and Television Arts at their annual BAFTA Television Awards ceremony.

This category has had minor name changes:

- From 1958 to 1962 it was presented as an individual award named Best Light Entertainment Artist.
- From 1963 to 1965 it was awarded as Best Light Entertainment Personality
- From 1967 to 1999 it was awarded as Best Light Entertainment Performance.
- Since 2000 the award has been known as Best Entertainment Performance.

Prior to the 1994 ceremony, acting performances in comedy roles were included in this category. Since 1994 they have been recognised in the Best Comedy Performance category.

== Winners and nominees ==

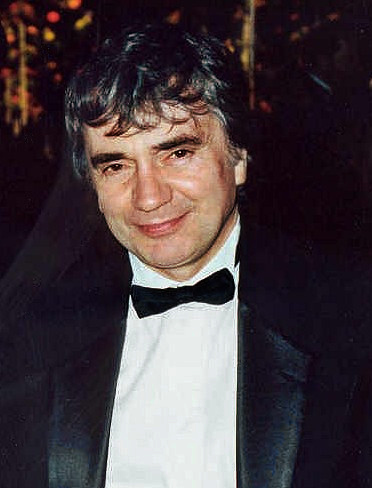
Comedians Peter Cook and Dudley Moore won the award for Not Only... But Also in 1966, the first time the award presented nominees.

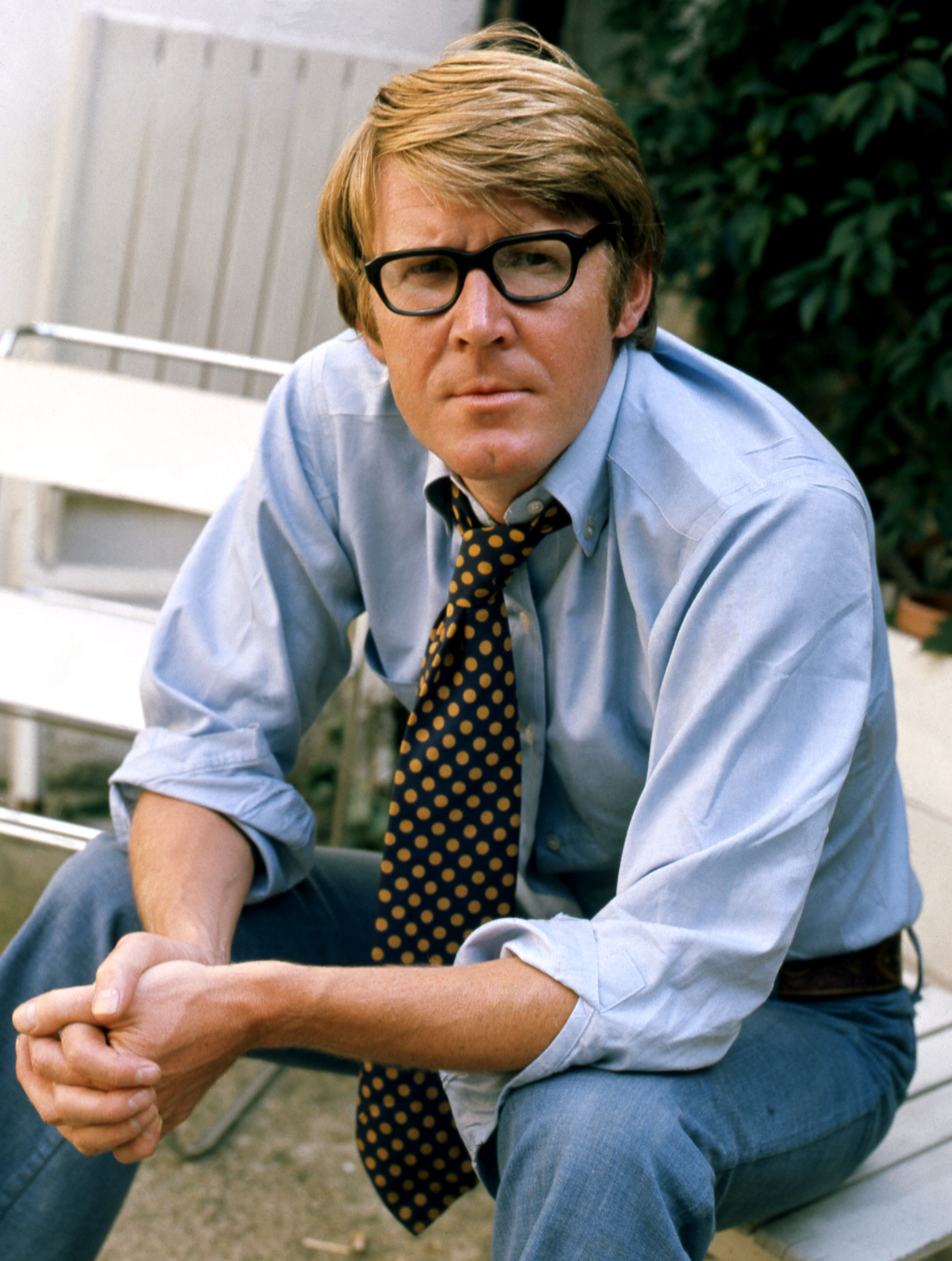
Alan Bennett won the award twice, in 1967 and 1968.

=== 1950s ===
| Year | Performer |
|---|---|
1958
| 1958 | Tony Hancock |
1959
| 1959 | Alan Melville |

=== 1960s ===
| Year | Performer | Programme |
|---|---|---|
1960
| 1960 | Tony Hancock | |
1961
| 1961 | Stanley Baxter | |
1962
| 1962 | Eric Sykes | |
1963
| 1963 | Michael Bentine | |
1964
| 1964 | Morecambe and Wise | |
1965
| 1965 | Millicent Martin | |
1966
| 1966 | Peter Cook, Dudley Moore | Not Only... But Also |
| 1966 | John Bird | Not So Much a Programme, More a Way of Life |
| 1966 | Charlie Drake | The Worker |
| 1966 | Benny Hill | The Benny Hill Show |
| 1966 | Terry Scott | Scott on Birds; Scott on Money; Scott on Food; Hugh and I; Christmas Night with the Stars |
1967
| 1967 | Alan Bennett | |
1968
| 1968 | Alan Bennett | |
1969
| 1969 | Marty Feldman | Marty |

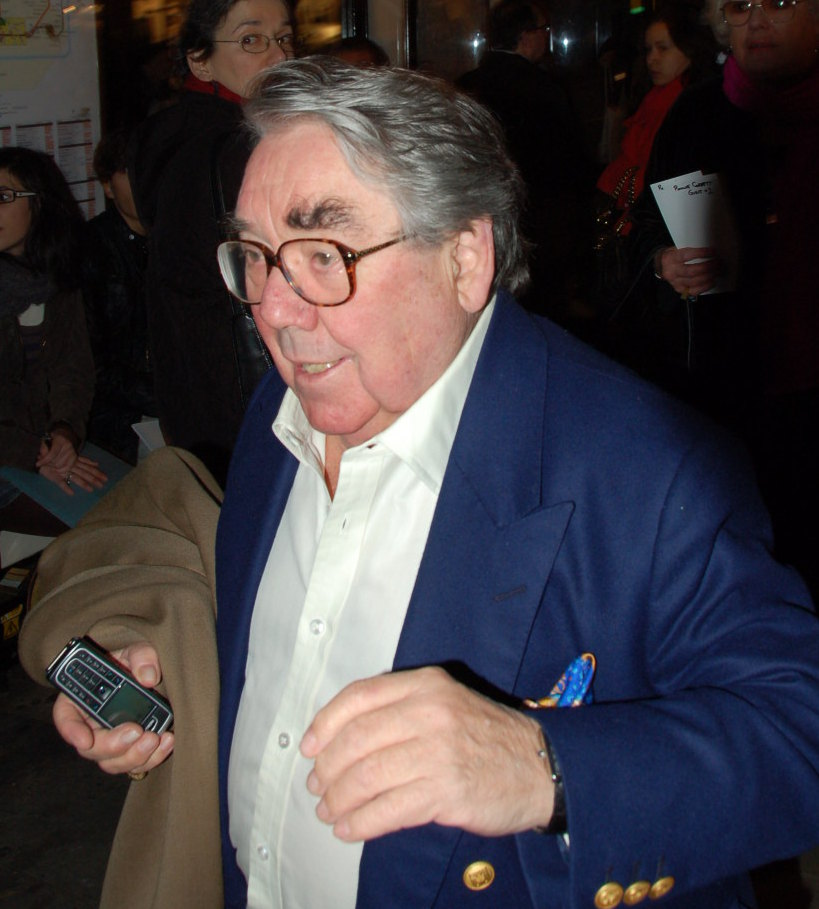
Ronnie Corbett won for The Two Ronnies in 1972.

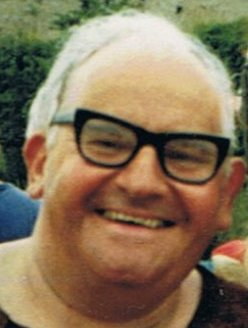
Ronnie Barker was won four times, 1972, 1976, 1978 and 1979, for The Two Ronnies, Porridge and Going Straight.

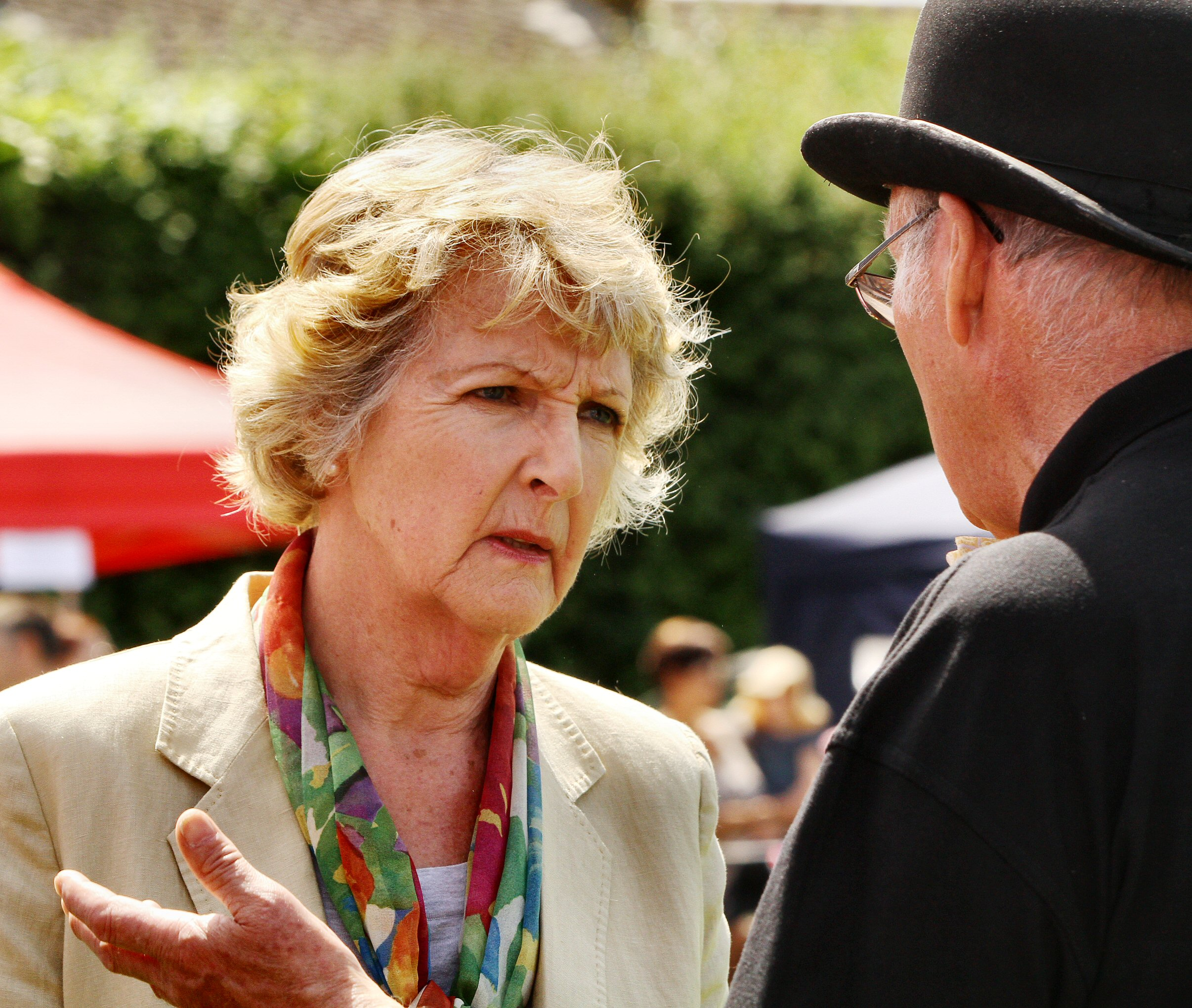
Penelope Keith won for The Good Life in 1977.

=== 1970s ===
| Year | Performer | Programme |
|---|---|---|
1970
| 1970 | Eric Morecambe & Ernie Wise | The Morecambe and Wise Show |
| 1970 | Ronnie Barker | Hark at Barker |
| 1970 | John Cleese | Monty Python's Flying Circus |
| 1970 | Spike Milligan | The World of Beachcomber; Q.5; Curry and Chips |
1971
| 1971 | Eric Morecambe & Ernie Wise | The Morecambe and Wise Show |
| 1971 | John Cleese | Monty Python's Flying Circus |
| 1971 | Ronnie Corbett | Frost Show; No – That's Me Over Here! |
| 1971 | Frankie Howerd | Up Pompeii! |
| 1971 | Arthur Lowe | Dad's Army |
1972
| 1972 | Ronnie Barker & Ronnie Corbett | The Two Ronnies |
| 1972 | Dick Emery | The Dick Emery Show |
| 1972 | Benny Hill | The Benny Hill Show |
1973
| 1973 | Eric Morecambe & Ernie Wise | The Morecambe and Wise Show |
| 1973 | Arthur Lowe | Dad's Army |
| 1973 | Monty Python Team | Monty Python's Flying Circus |
1974
| 1974 | Eric Morecambe & Ernie Wise | The Morecambe and Wise Show |
| 1974 | Dave Allen | Dave Allen At Large |
| 1974 | Stanley Baxter | The Stanley Baxter Big Picture Show |
| 1974 | Ronnie Barker & Ronnie Corbett | The Two Ronnies |
1975
| 1975 | Stanley Baxter | The Moving Picture Show |
| 1975 | Ronnie Barker | Porridge |
| 1975 | Michael Crawford | Some Mothers Do 'Ave 'Em |
| 1975 | Arthur Lowe | Dad's Army |
1976
| 1976 | Ronnie Barker | Porridge |
| 1976 | Ronnie Barker & Ronnie Corbett | The Two Ronnies |
| 1976 | Stanley Baxter | The Stanley Picture Show Part III |
| 1976 | John Cleese | Fawlty Towers |
1977
| 1977 | Penelope Keith | The Good Life |
| 1977 | Ronnie Barker | Open All Hours; The Two Ronnies |
| 1977 | Richard Briers | The Good Life; One-Upmanship |
| 1977 | Leonard Rossiter | The Fall and Rise of Reginald Perrin |
1978
| 1978 | Ronnie Barker | Porridge & The Two Ronnies |
| 1978 | Penelope Keith | The Good Life; The Morecambe and Wise Christmas Show |
| 1978 | Arthur Lowe | Dad's Army |
| 1978 | Leonard Rossiter | The Fall and Rise of Reginald Perrin; Rising Damp |
1979
| 1979 | Ronnie Barker | Going Straight & The Two Ronnies |
| 1979 | Leonard Rossiter | The Fall and Rise of Reginald Perrin; The Losers; Rising Damp |
| 1979 | Donald Sinden | Two's Company |
| 1979 | Elaine Stritch | Two's Company |

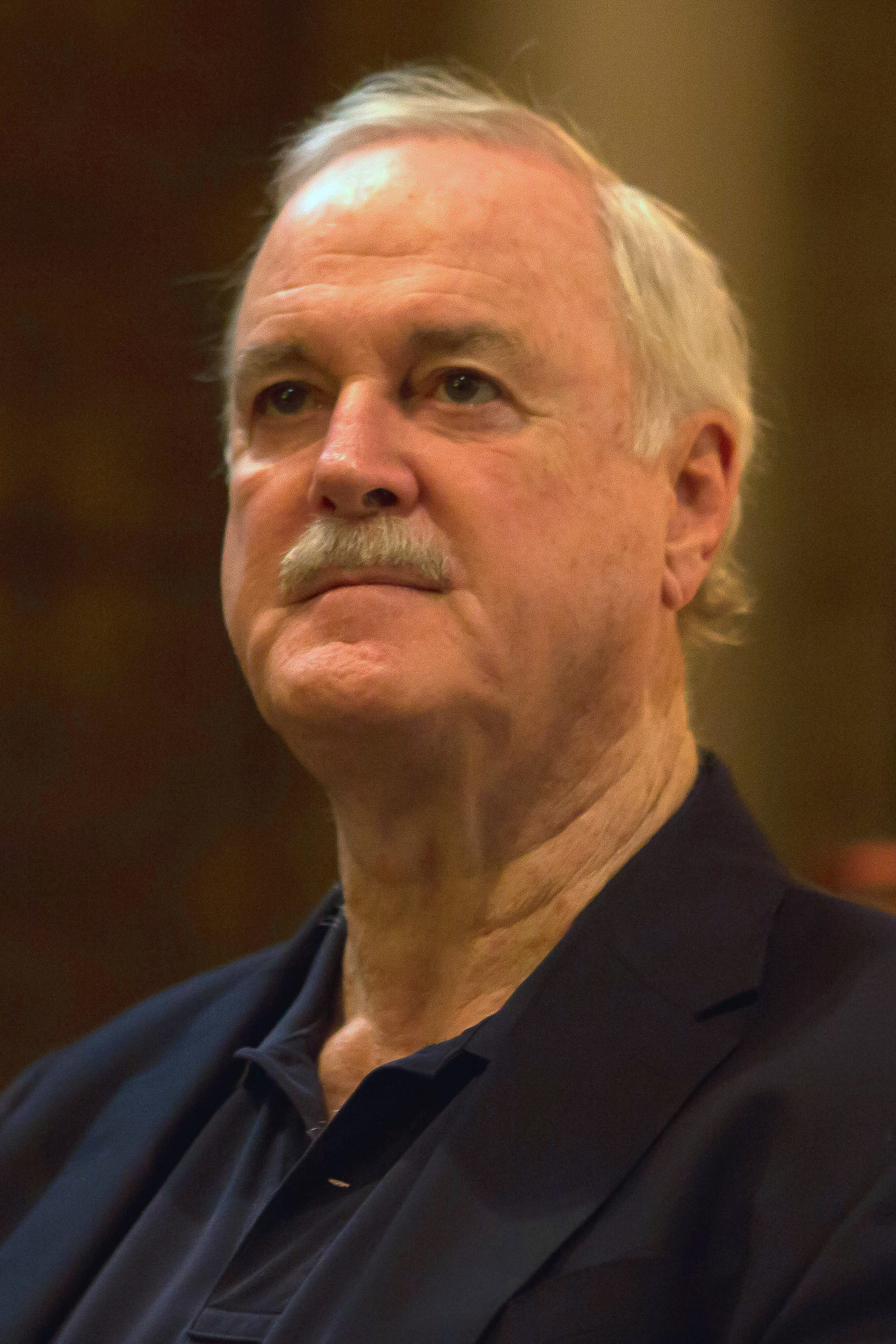
John Cleese won in 1980 for Fawlty Towers.

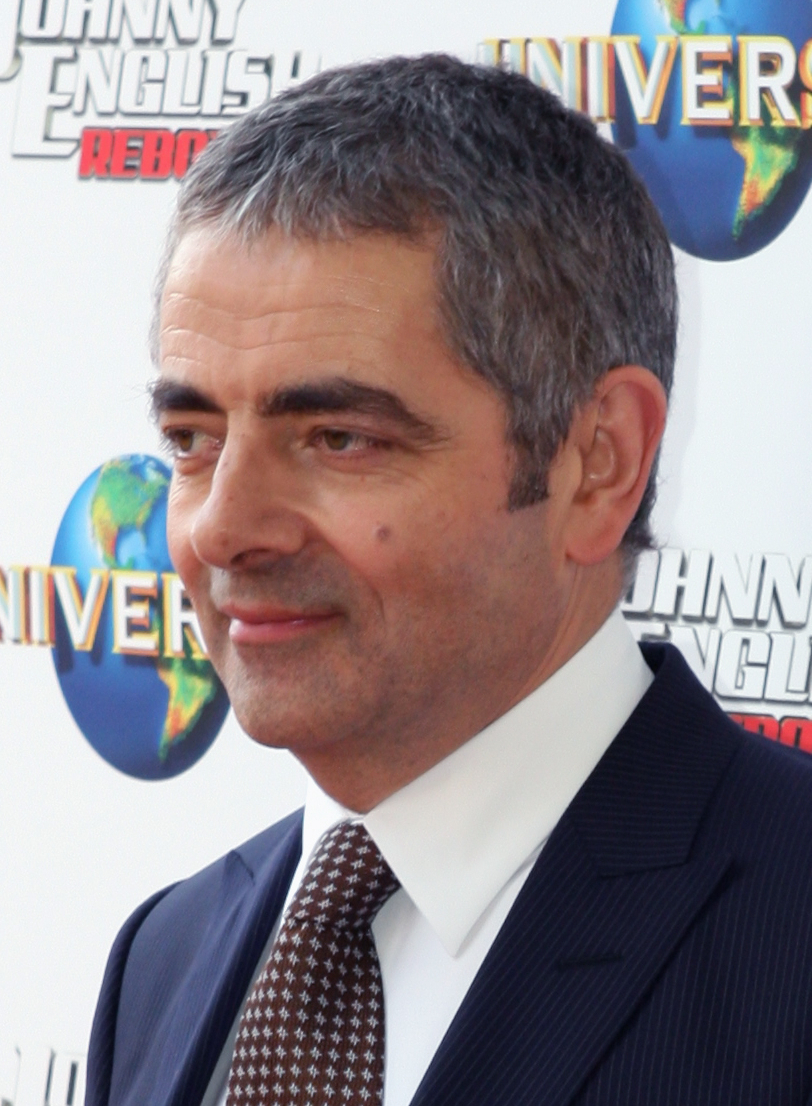
Rowan Atkinson has won this award twice, for Not the Nine O'Clock News (1981) and Blackadder Goes Forth (1990).

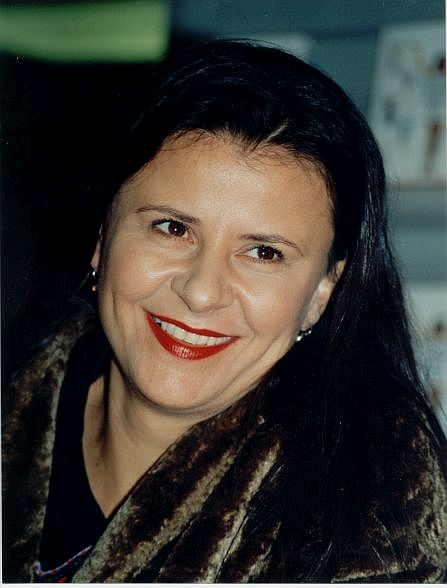
Tracey Ullman won for Three of a Kind in 1984.

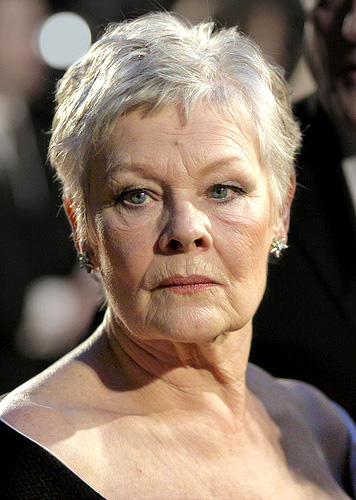
Judi Dench won for A Fine Romance in 1985.

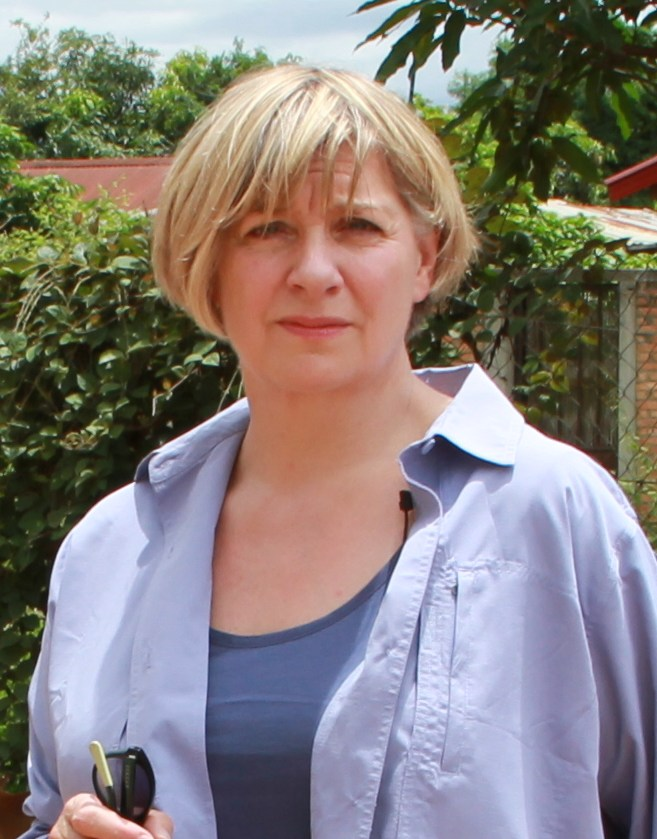
Victoria Wood was won twice, for Victoria Wood: As Seen on TV (1986) and An Audience with Victoria Wood (1989).

=== 1980s ===
| Year | Performer | Programme |
|---|---|---|
1980
| 1980 | John Cleese | Fawlty Towers |
| 1980 | Ronnie Barker | The Two Ronnies |
| 1980 | Penelope Keith | To The Manor Born |
| 1980 | Andrew Sachs | Fawlty Towers |
1981
| 1981 | Rowan Atkinson | Not the Nine O'Clock News |
| 1981 | Barry Humphries | An Audience with Dame Edna Everage |
| 1981 | Maureen Lipman | Agony |
| 1981 | Pamela Stephenson | Not the Nine O'Clock News |
1982
| 1982 | Nigel Hawthorne | Yes Minister |
| 1982 | Dave Allen | The Dave Allen Show |
| 1982 | Paul Eddington | Yes Minister |
| 1982 | Stanley Baxter | The Stanley Baxter Series |
1983
| 1983 | Nigel Hawthorne | Yes Minister |
| 1983 | Rowan Atkinson | Not the Nine O'Clock News |
| 1983 | Judi Dench | A Fine Romance |
| 1983 | Paul Eddington | Yes Minister & Let There Be Love |
1984
| 1984 | Tracey Ullman | Three of a Kind |
| 1984 | Ronnie Barker & Ronnie Corbett | The Two Ronnies |
| 1984 | Judi Dench | A Fine Romance |
| 1984 | Jasper Carrot | Carrot's Lib |
1985
| 1985 | Judi Dench | A Fine Romance |
| 1985 | Lenny Henry | The Lenny Henry Show |
| 1985 | Julia McKenzie | Fresh Fields |
| 1985 | Ruth Madoc | Hi-de-Hi! |
| 1985 | Paul Nicholas | Just Good Friends |
1986
| 1986 | Victoria Wood | Victoria Wood As Seen On TV |
| 1986 | Ronnie Barker | Open All Hours & The Two Ronnies |
| 1986 | David Jason | Only Fools and Horses |
| 1986 | Gorden Kaye | 'Allo 'Allo! |
1987
| 1987 | Nigel Hawthorne | Yes, Prime Minister |
| 1987 | David Jason | Only Fools and Horses |
| 1987 | Nicholas Lyndhurst | Only Fools and Horses |
| 1987 | Paul Eddington | Yes, Prime Minister |
| 1987 | Julie Walters | Victoria Wood As Seen On TV |
| 1987 | Victoria Wood | Victoria Wood As Seen On TV |
1988
| 1988 | Nigel Hawthorne | Yes, Prime Minister |
| 1988 | Rowan Atkinson | Blackadder the Third |
| 1988 | Paul Eddington | Yes, Prime Minister |
| 1988 | Barry Humphries | The Dame Edna Experience |
1989
| 1989 | Victoria Wood | An Audience with Victoria Wood |
| 1989 | Dawn French | French and Saunders |
| 1989 | Barry Humphries | One More Audience with Dame Edna |
| 1989 | David Jason | Only Fools and Horses |

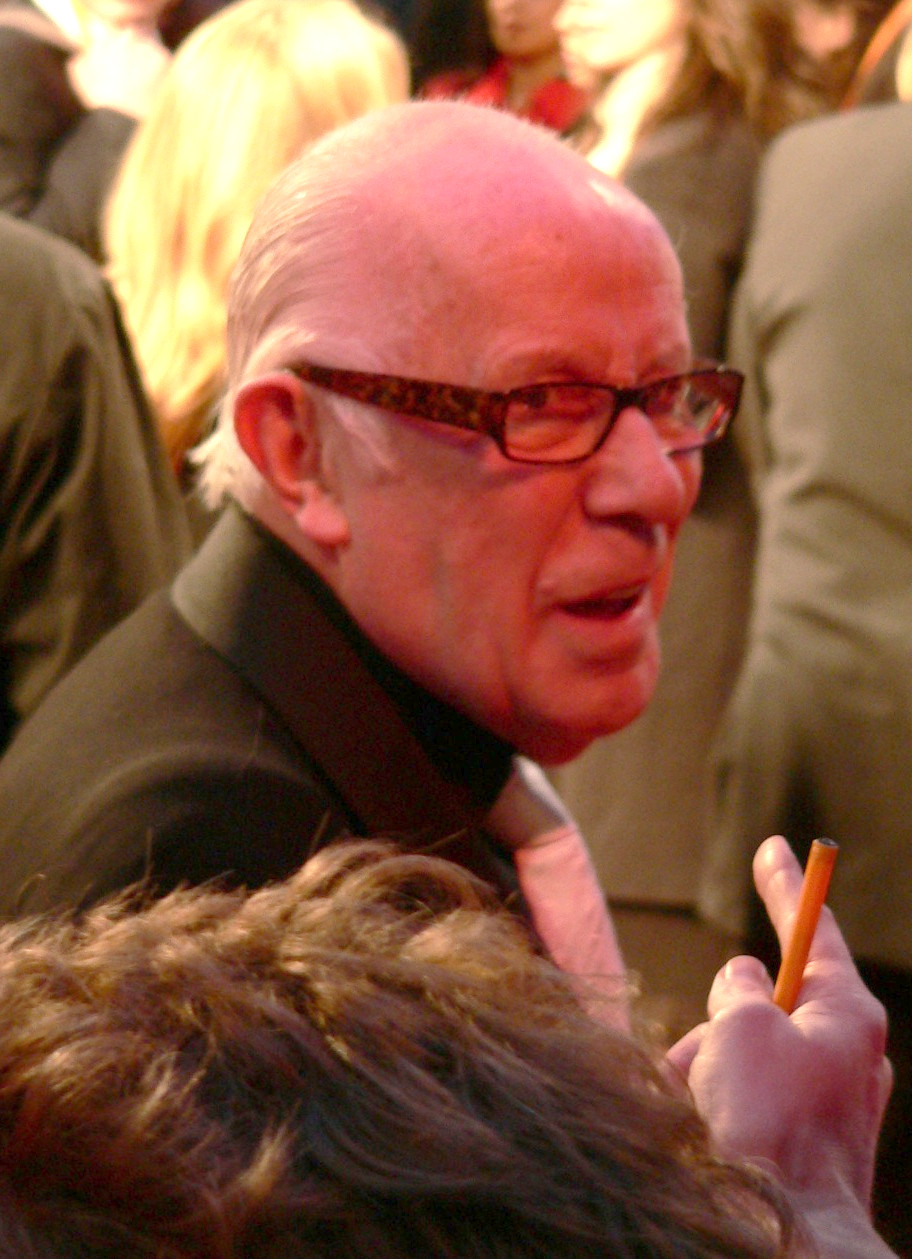
Richard Wilson has won twice, in 1992 and 1994, both for One Foot in the Grave.

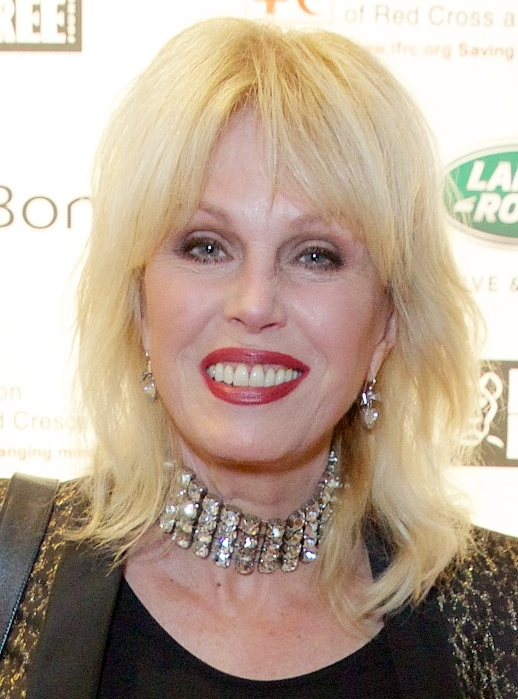
Joanna Lumley won for Absolutely Fabulous in 1993.

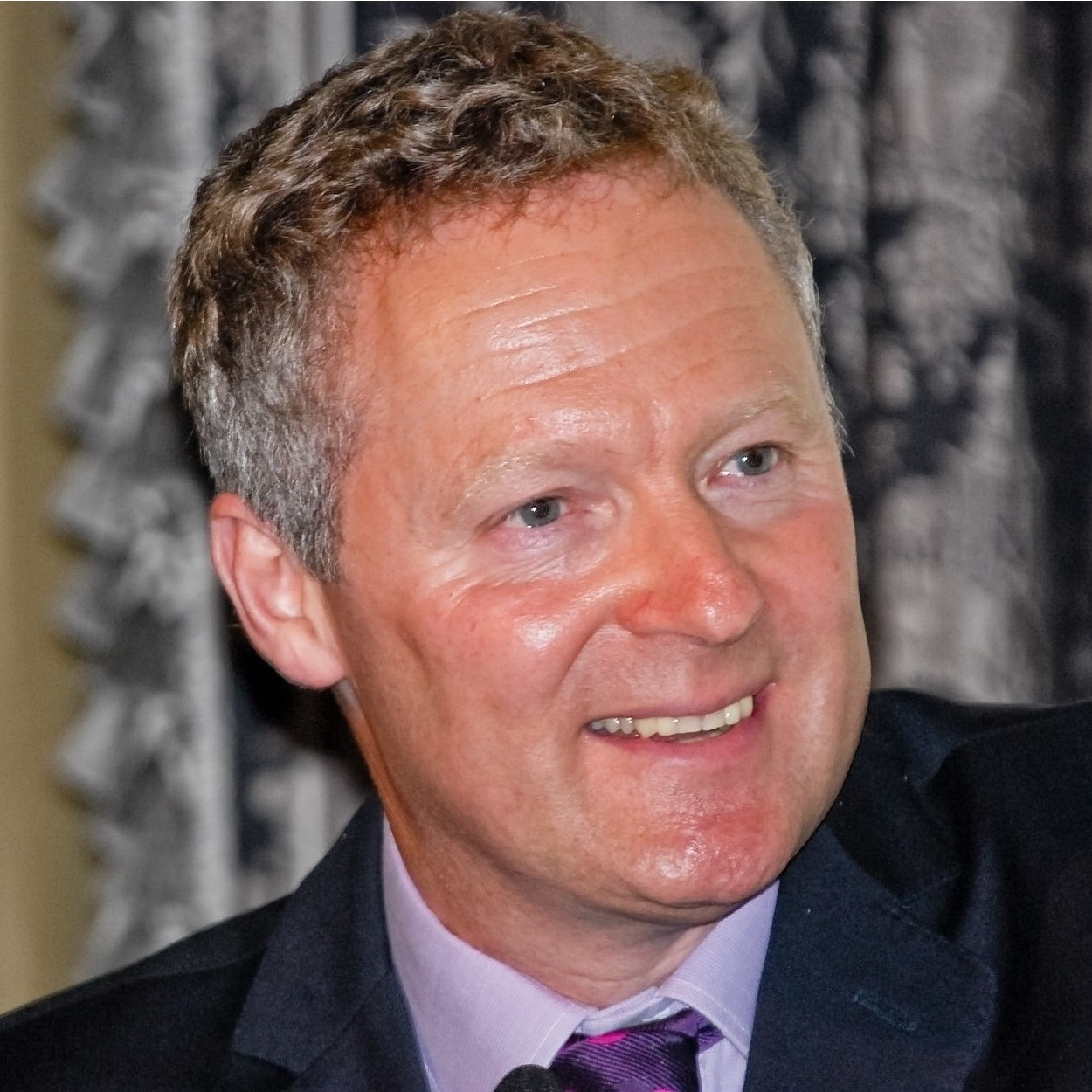
Rory Bremner won two consecutive times, both for Rory Bremner...Who Else? in 1995 and 1996.

=== 1990s ===
| Year | Performer | Programme | Network |
|---|---|---|---|
1990
| 1990 | Rowan Atkinson | Blackadder Goes Forth | BBC One |
| 1990 | Barry Humphries | The Dame Edna Experience | ITV |
| 1990 | David Jason | Only Fools and Horses | BBC One |
| 1990 | Victoria Wood | Victoria Wood | BBC One |
1991
| 1991 | David Jason | Only Fools and Horses | BBC One |
| 1991 | Rowan Atkinson | The Return of Mr. Bean | ITV |
| 1991 | Dawn French | French and Saunders | BBC Two |
| 1991 | Nicholas Lyndhurst | Only Fools and Horses | BBC One |
1992
| 1992 | Richard Wilson | One Foot in the Grave | BBC One |
| 1992 | Rowan Atkinson | The Curse of Mr. Bean | ITV |
| 1992 | Haydn Gwynne | Drop the Dead Donkey | Channel 4 |
| 1992 | Patricia Routledge | Keeping Up Appearances | BBC One |
1993
| 1993 | Joanna Lumley | Absolutely Fabulous | BBC One |
| 1993 | Patricia Routledge | Keeping Up Appearances | BBC One |
| 1993 | Richard Wilson | One Foot in the Grave | BBC One |
| 1993 | Jennifer Saunders | Absolutely Fabulous | BBC One |
1994
| 1994 | Richard Wilson | One Foot in the Grave; One Foot in the Algarve | BBC One |
| 1994 | Rowan Atkinson | Mr. Bean | ITV |
| 1994 | Rory Bremner | Rory Bremner...Who Else? | Channel 4 |
| 1994 | Annette Crosbie | One Foot in the Grave | BBC One |
| 1994 | Paul Merton | Have I Got News for You | BBC Two |
1995
| 1995 | Rory Bremner | Rory Bremner...Who Else? | Channel 4 |
| 1995 | Michael Barrymore | Barrymore | ITV |
| 1995 | Steve Coogan | Knowing Me, Knowing You... with Alan Partridge | BBC Two |
| 1995 | Victoria Wood | Victoria Wood: Live in Your Own Home | BBC One |
1996 (42nd)
| 1996 (42nd) | Rory Bremner | Rory Bremner...Who Else? | Channel 4 |
| 1996 (42nd) | Caroline Aherne | The Mrs. Merton Show | BBC One |
| 1996 (42nd) | Paul Merton | Have I Got News for You | BBC Two |
| 1996 (42nd) | Peter Ustinov | An Evening with Peter Ustinov | ITV |
1997 (43rd)
| 1997 (43rd) | John Bird & John Fortune | Rory Bremner...Who Else?/The Long John's | Channel 4 |
| 1997 (43rd) | Caroline Aherne | The Mrs. Merton Christmas Show | BBC One |
| 1997 (43rd) | Paul Merton | Have I Got News for You | BBC Two |
| 1997 (43rd) | Rory Bremner | Rory Bremner... Who Else? | Channel 4 |
1998 (44th)
| 1998 (44th) | Paul Whitehouse | The Fast Show | BBC Two |
| 1998 (44th) | Kathy Burke | Harry Enfield & Chums | BBC One |
| 1998 (44th) | Harry Enfield | Harry Enfield & Chums | BBC One |
| 1998 (44th) | Paul Merton | Have I Got News for You | BBC Two |
1999 (45th)
| 1999 (45th) | Michael Parkinson | Parkinson | BBC One |
| 1999 (45th) | John Bird & John Fortune | Rory Bremner... Who Else? | Channel 4 |
| 1999 (45th) | Kathy Burke | Harry Enfield's Yule Log Chums | BBC One |
| 1999 (45th) | Billy Connolly | 30 Years of Billy Connolly | BBC One |

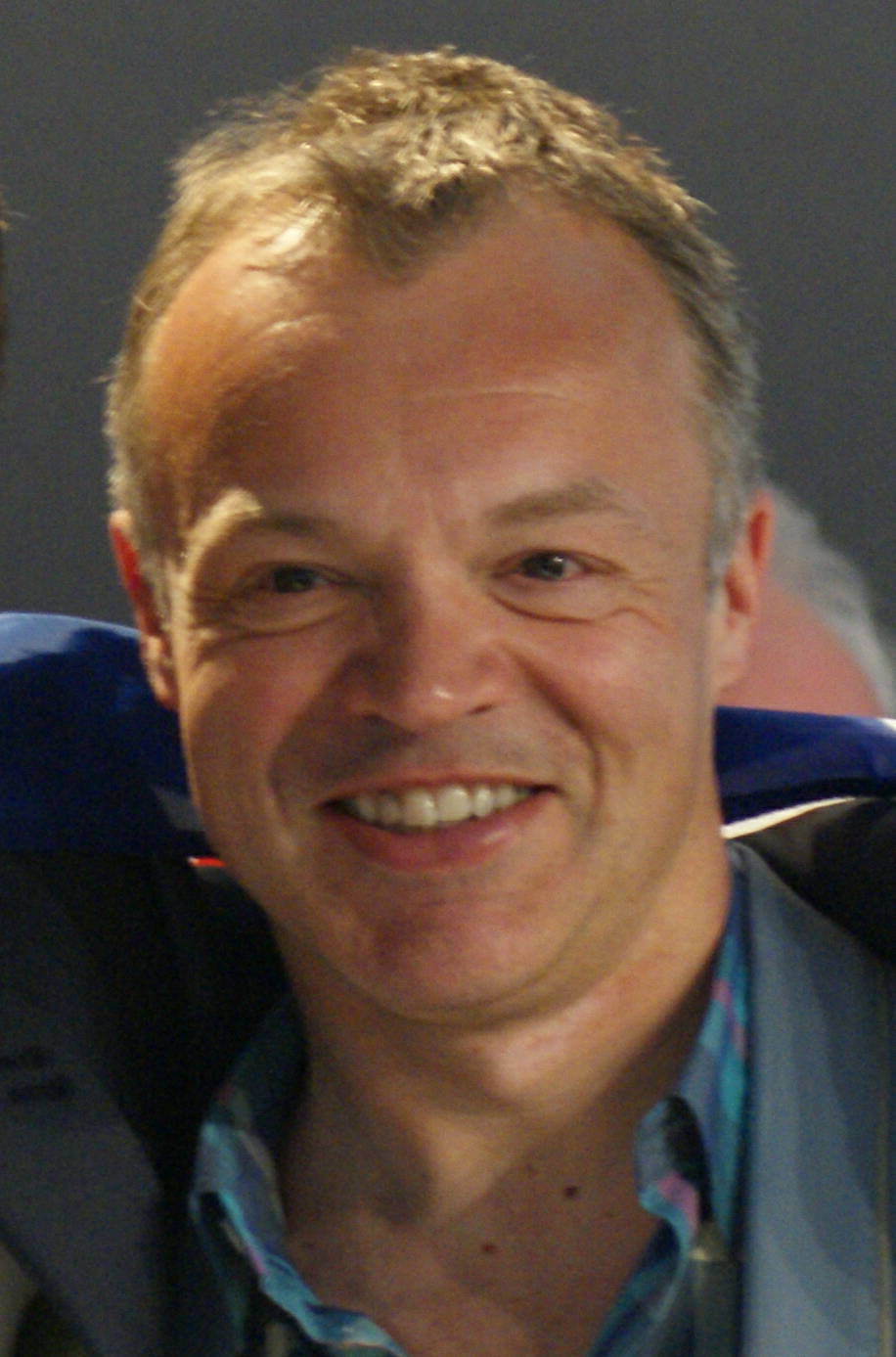
Graham Norton was won the award six times, three for So Graham Norton (2000–2002) and The Graham Norton Show (2011, 2012 and 2018).

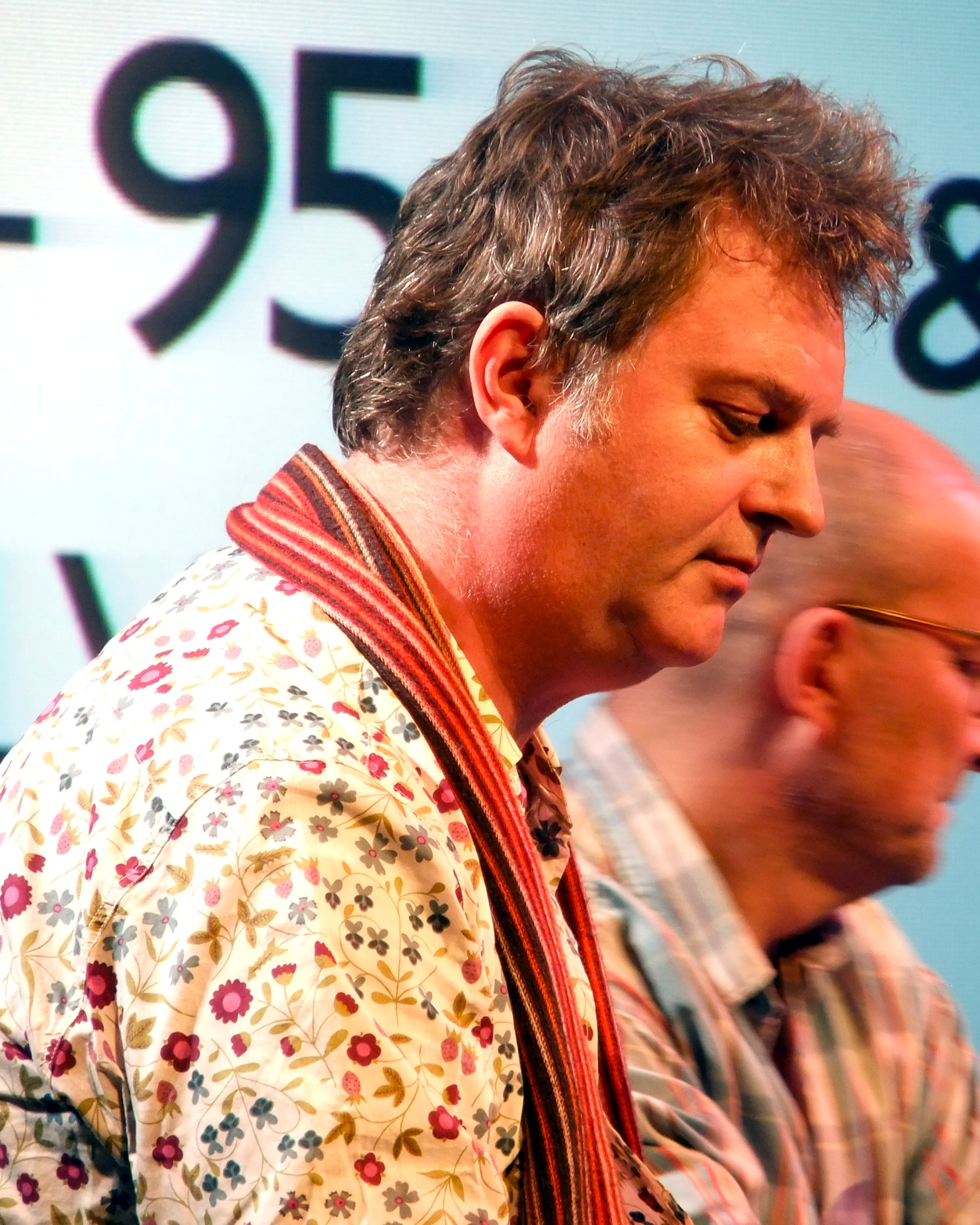
Paul Merton won for Have I Got News for You in 2003.

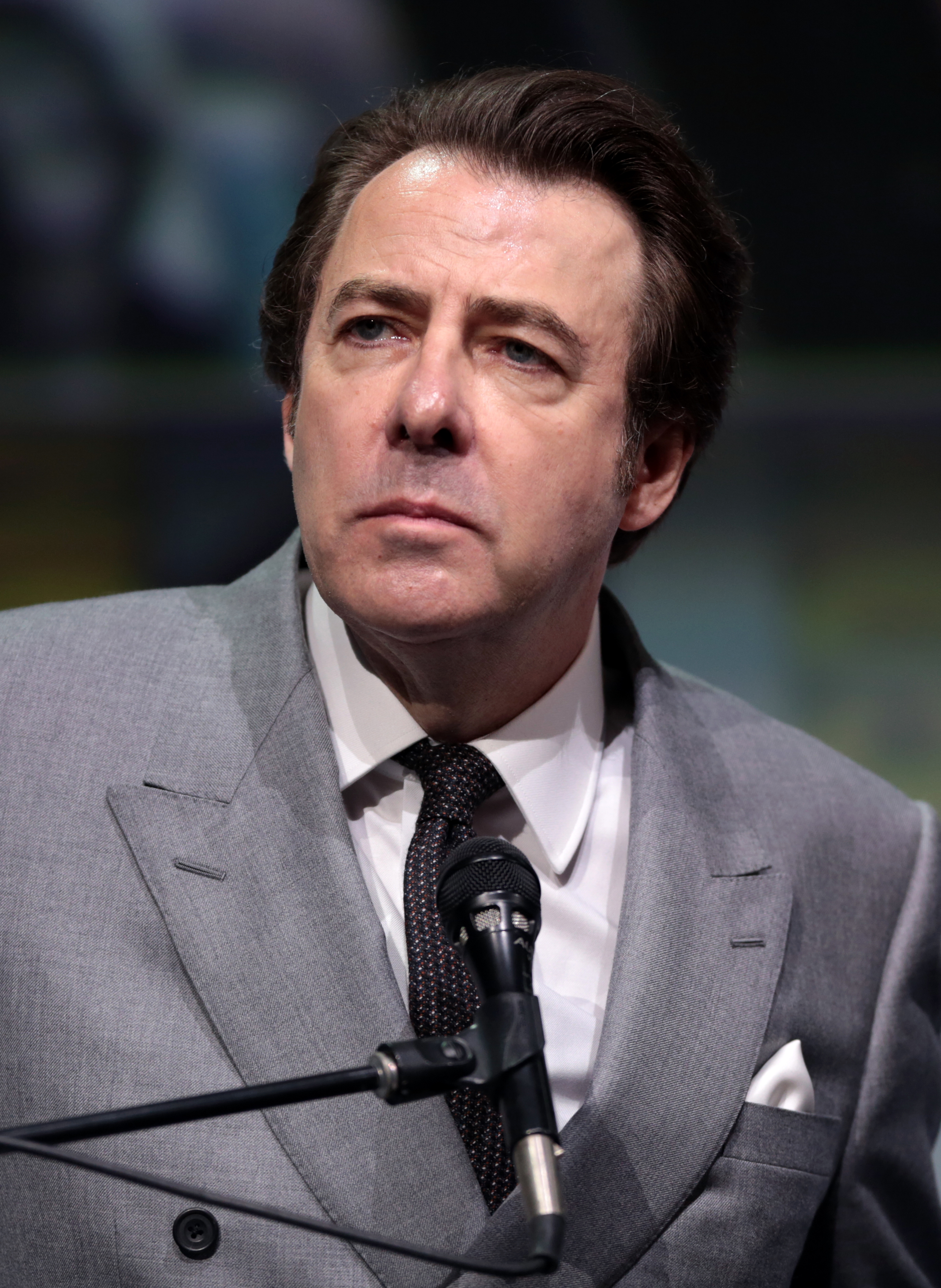
Jonathan Ross has won three times, in 2004, 2006 and 2007, all three for Friday Night with Jonathan Ross.

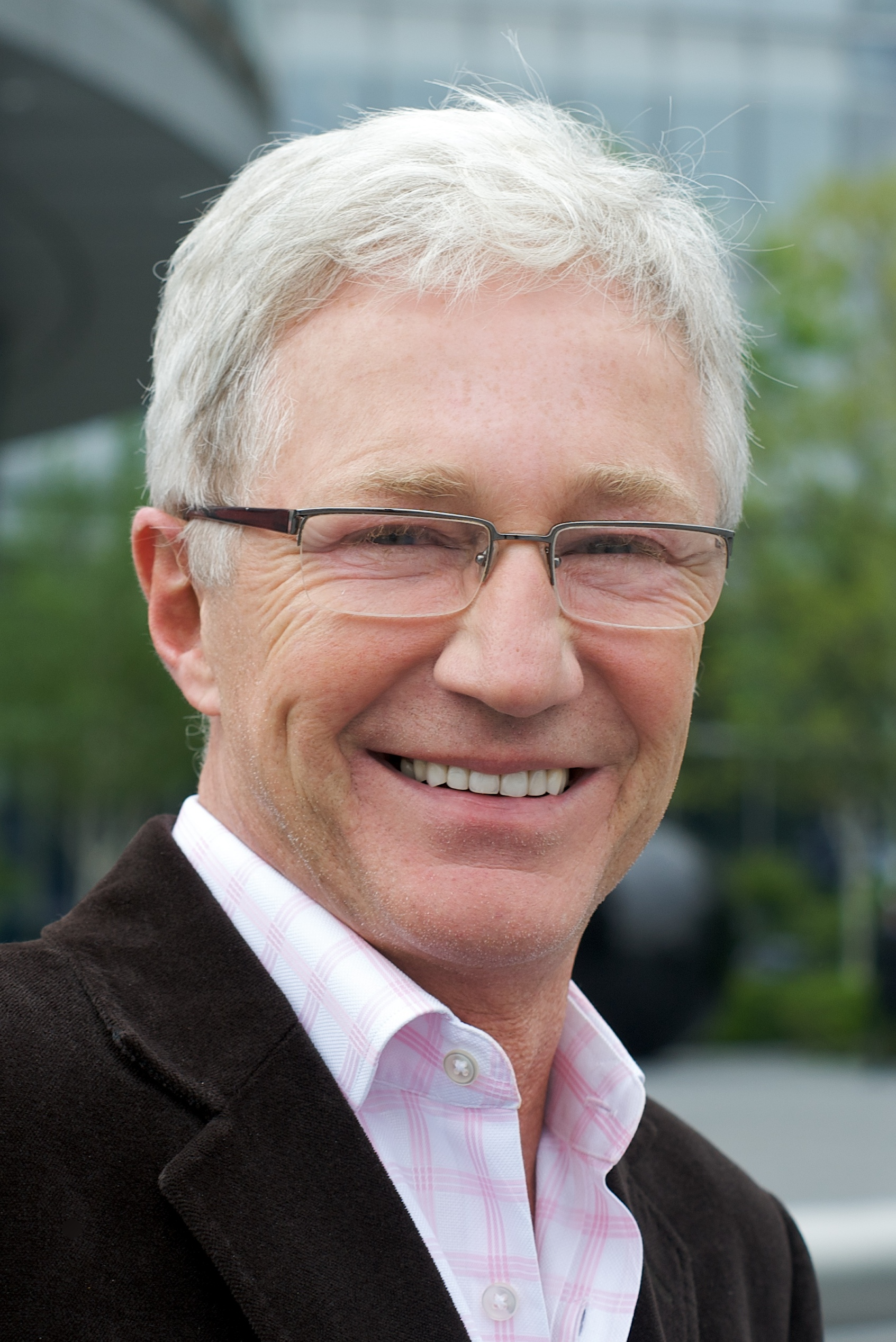
Paul O'Grady won for The Paul O'Grady Show in 2005.

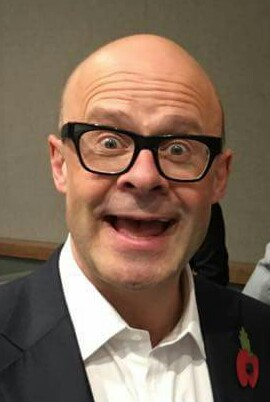
Harry Hill has won two consecutive times in 2008 and 2009, both for Harry Hill's TV Burp.

=== 2000s ===
| Year | Performer | Programme | Network |
|---|---|---|---|
2000 (46th)
| 2000 (46th) | Graham Norton | So Graham Norton | Channel 4 |
| 2000 (46th) | John Bird & John Fortune | Bremner, Bird and Fortune | Channel 4 |
| 2000 (46th) | Sacha Baron Cohen | The 11 O'Clock Show | Channel 4 |
| 2000 (46th) | Michael Parkinson | Parkinson | BBC One |
2001 (47th)
| 2001 (47th) | Graham Norton | So Graham Norton | Channel 4 |
| 2001 (47th) | Angus Deayton | Have I Got News for You | BBC One |
| 2001 (47th) | Paul Merton | Have I Got News for You | BBC One |
| 2001 (47th) | Rory Bremner | Blair Did It All Go Wrong? | Channel 4 |
2002 (48th)
| 2002 (48th) | Graham Norton | So Graham Norton | Channel 4 |
| 2002 (48th) | Anthony McPartlin & Declan Donnelly | Pop Idol | ITV |
| 2002 (48th) | Paul Merton | Have I Got News for You | BBC One |
| 2002 (48th) | John Bird & John Fortune | Bremner, Bird and Fortune | Channel 4 |
2003 (49th)
| 2003 (49th) | Paul Merton | Have I Got News for You | BBC One |
| 2003 (49th) | Sanjeev Bhaskar | The Kumars at No. 42 | BBC Two |
| 2003 (49th) | Meera Syal | The Kumars at No. 42 | BBC Two |
| 2003 (49th) | Angus Deayton | Have I Got News for You | BBC One |
2004 (50th)
| 2004 (50th) | Jonathan Ross | Friday Night with Jonathan Ross | BBC One |
| 2004 (50th) | Stephen Fry | QI | BBC Four/BBC Two |
| 2004 (50th) | Boris Johnson | Have I Got News for You | BBC One |
| 2004 (50th) | Paul Merton | Have I Got News for You | BBC One |
2005 (51st)
| 2005 (51st) | Paul O'Grady | The Paul O'Grady Show | ITV |
| 2005 (51st) | Stephen Fry | QI | BBC Four/BBC Two |
| 2005 (51st) | Anthony McPartlin & Declan Donnelly | I'm a Celebrity...Get Me Out of Here! | ITV |
| 2005 (51st) | Paul Merton | Have I Got News for You | BBC One |
2006 (52nd)
| 2006 (52nd) | Jonathan Ross | Friday Night with Jonathan Ross | BBC One |
| 2006 (52nd) | Jeremy Clarkson | Top Gear | BBC Two |
| 2006 (52nd) | Jack Dee | Jack Dee Live at the Apollo | BBC One |
| 2006 (52nd) | Noel Edmonds | Deal or No Deal | Channel 4 |
2007 (53rd)
| 2007 (53rd) | Jonathan Ross | Friday Night with Jonathan Ross | BBC One |
| 2007 (53rd) | Anthony McPartlin & Declan Donnelly | Ant and Dec's Saturday Night Takeaway | ITV |
| 2007 (53rd) | Stephen Fry | QI | BBC Four/BBC Two |
| 2007 (53rd) | Paul Merton | Have I Got News for You | BBC One |
2008 (54th)
| 2008 (54th) | Harry Hill | Harry Hill's TV Burp | ITV |
| 2008 (54th) | Simon Amstell | Never Mind the Buzzcocks | BBC One |
| 2008 (54th) | Alan Carr & Justin Lee Collins | The Friday Night Project | Channel 4 |
| 2008 (54th) | Stephen Fry | QI | BBC Two |
2009 (55th)
| 2009 (55th) | Harry Hill | Harry Hill's TV Burp | ITV |
| 2009 (55th) | Stephen Fry | QI | BBC One/BBC Two |
| 2009 (55th) | Anthony McPartlin & Declan Donnelly | I'm a Celebrity...Get Me Out of Here! | ITV |
| 2009 (55th) | Jonathan Ross | Friday Night with Jonathan Ross | BBC One |

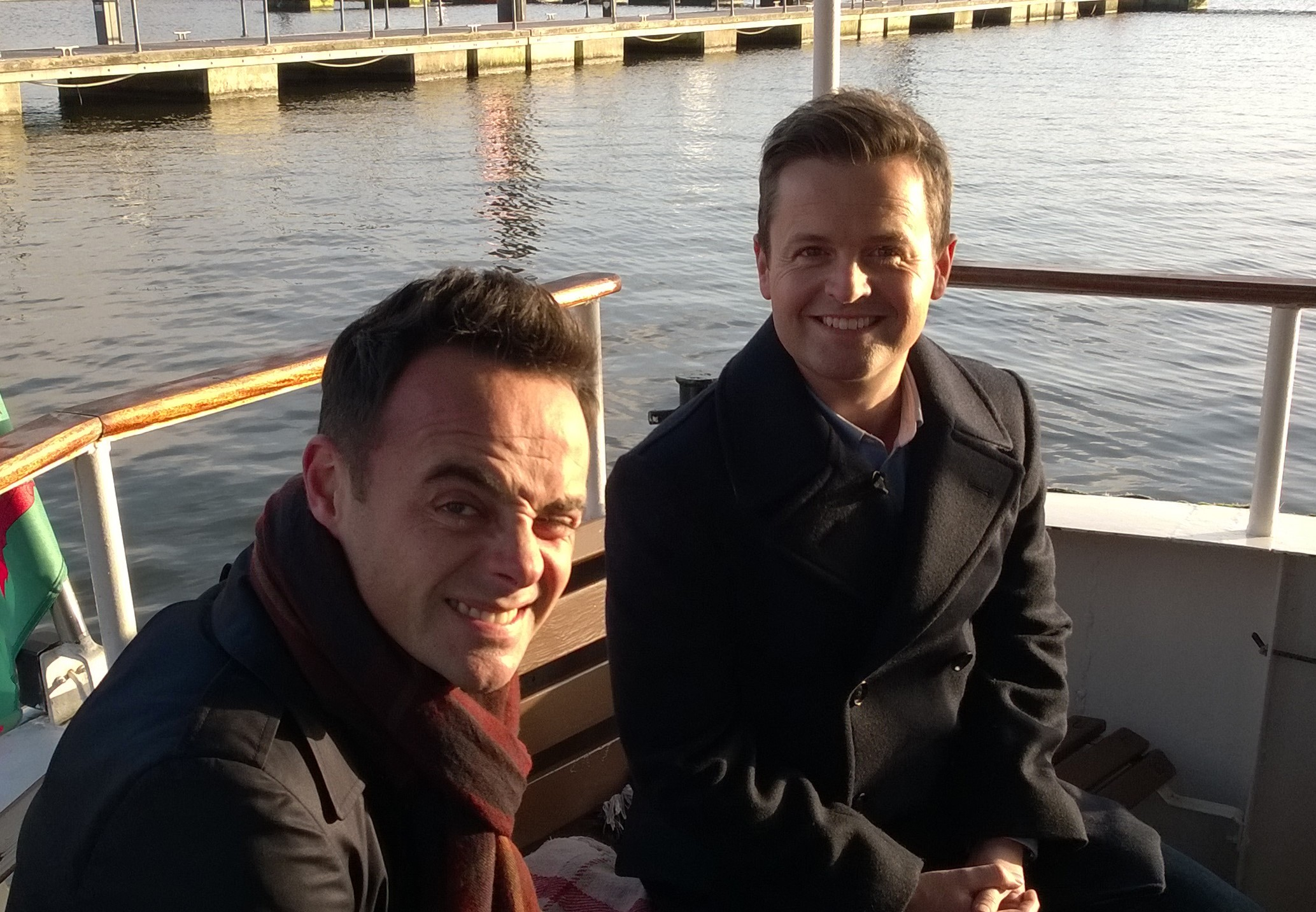
Ant McPartlin (left) and Declan Donnelly (right) won three times, for I'm a Celebrity...Get Me Out of Here! (2010) and Ant & Dec's Saturday Night Takeaway (2014 and 2015).

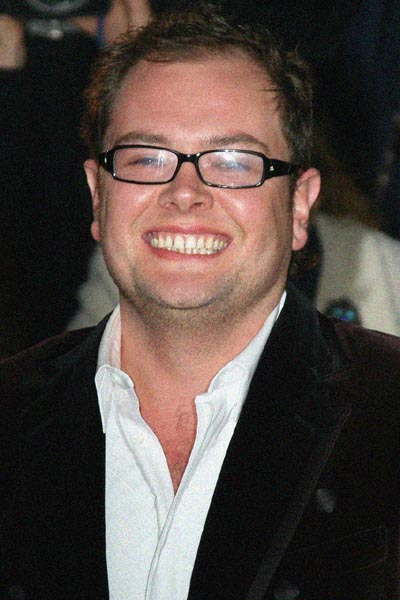
Alan Carr won for Alan Carr: Chatty Man in 2013.

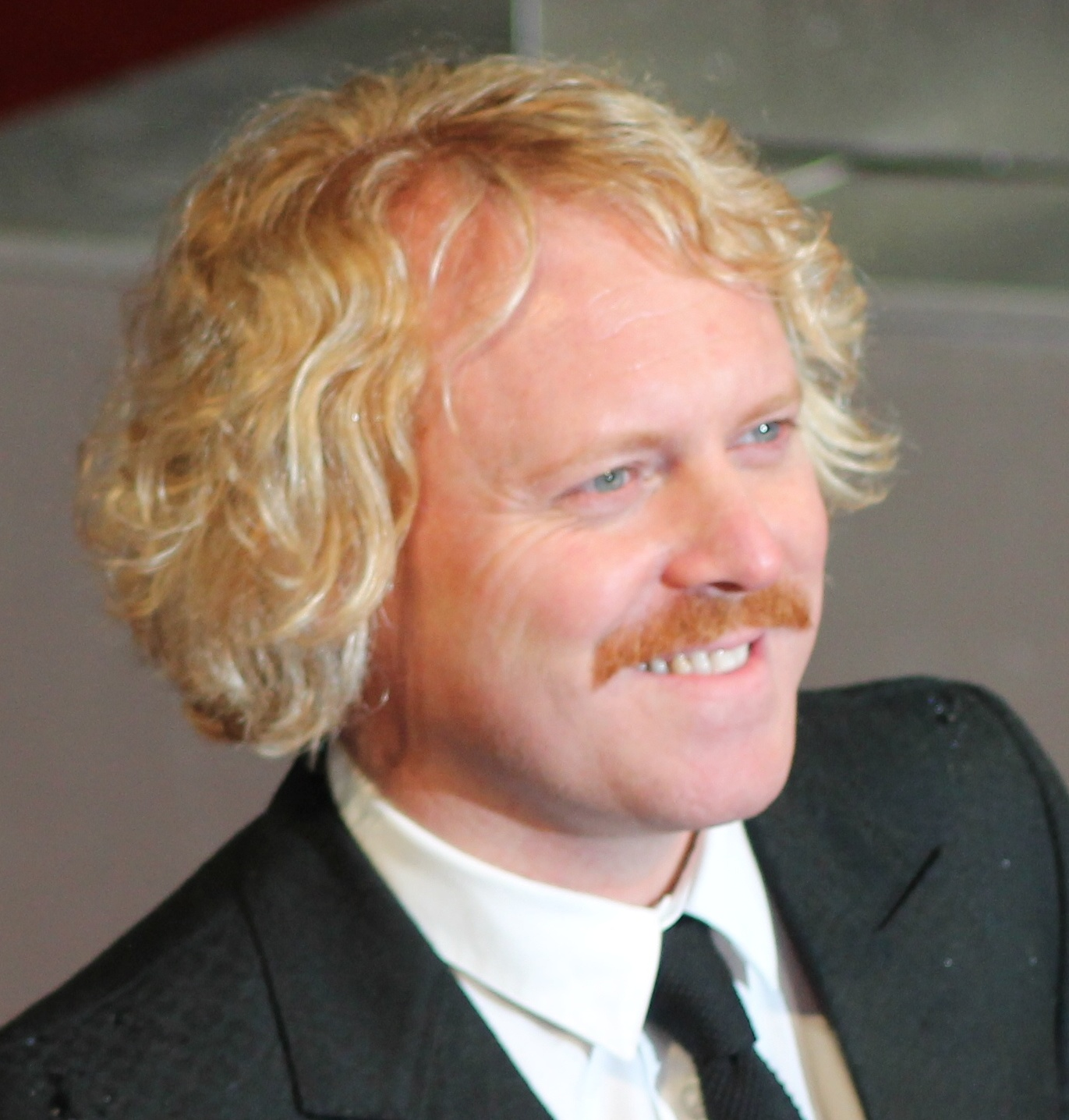
Leigh Francis won for Celebrity Juice in 2016.

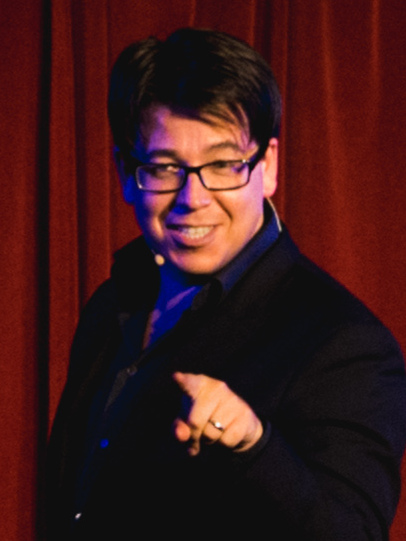
Michael McIntyre won for Michael McIntyre's Big Show in 2017.

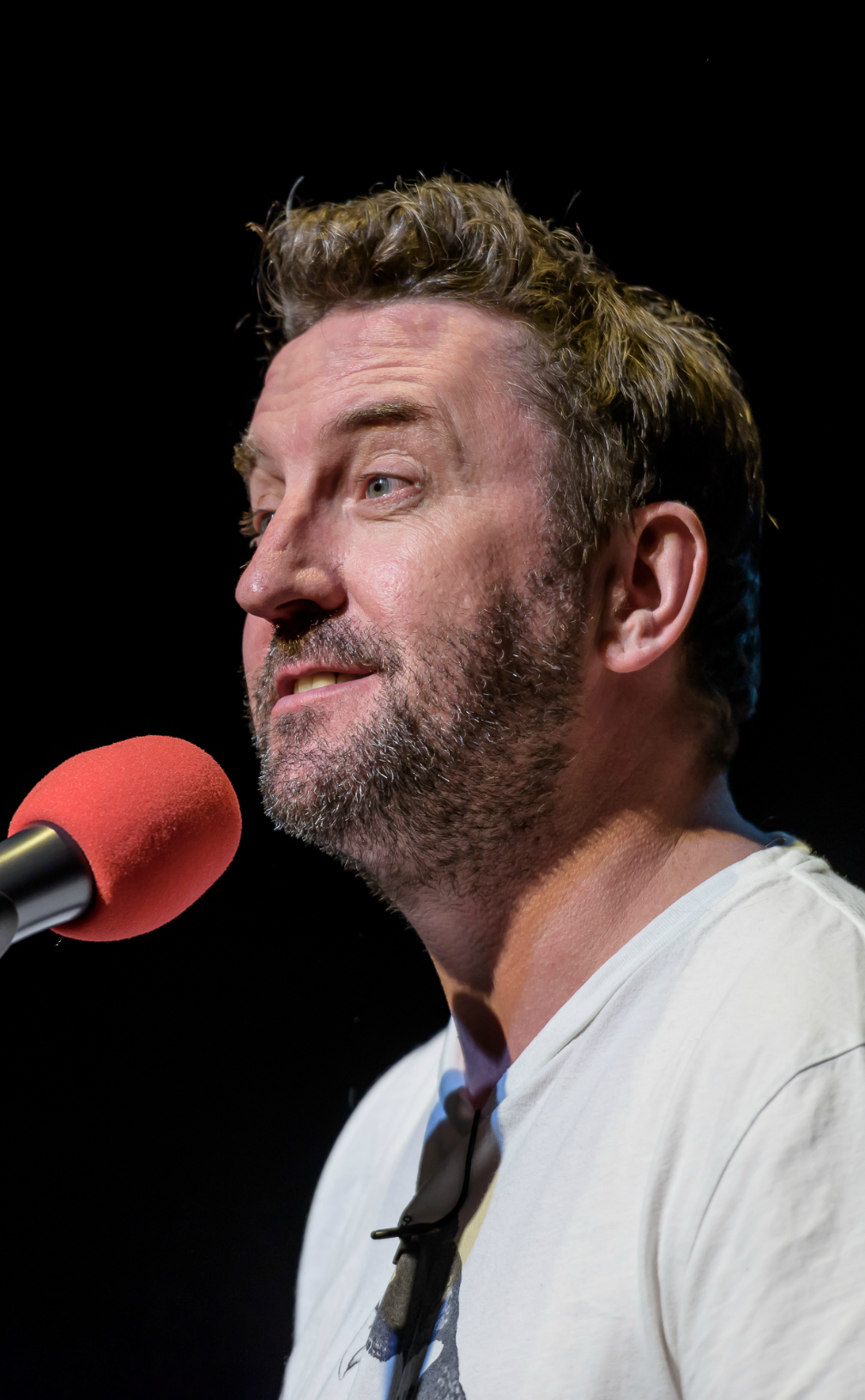
Lee Mack won for Would I Lie to You? in 2019.

=== 2010s ===
| Year | Performer | Programme | Network |
|---|---|---|---|
2010 (56th)
| 2010 (56th) | Anthony McPartlin & Declan Donnelly | I'm a Celebrity...Get Me Out of Here! | ITV1 |
| 2010 (56th) | Stephen Fry | QI | BBC Two/BBC One |
| 2010 (56th) | Harry Hill | Harry Hill's TV Burp | ITV1 |
| 2010 (56th) | Michael McIntyre | Michael McIntyre's Comedy Roadshow | BBC One |
2011 (57th)
| 2011 (57th) | Graham Norton | The Graham Norton Show | BBC One |
| 2011 (57th) | Rob Brydon | The Rob Brydon Show | BBC Two |
| 2011 (57th) | Stephen Fry | QI | BBC Two |
| 2011 (57th) | Harry Hill | Harry Hill's TV Burp | ITV1 |
2012 (58th)
| 2012 (58th) | Graham Norton | The Graham Norton Show | BBC One |
| 2012 (58th) | Alan Carr | Alan Carr: Chatty Man | Channel 4 |
| 2012 (58th) | Harry Hill | Harry Hill's TV Burp | ITV1 |
| 2012 (58th) | Dara Ó Briain | Mock the Week | BBC Two |
2013 (59th)
| 2013 (59th) | Alan Carr | Alan Carr: Chatty Man | Channel 4 |
| 2013 (59th) | Anthony McPartlin & Declan Donnelly | I'm a Celebrity...Get Me Out of Here! | ITV |
| 2013 (59th) | Sarah Millican | The Sarah Millican Television Programme | BBC Two |
| 2013 (59th) | Graham Norton | The Graham Norton Show | BBC One |
2014 (60th)
| 2014 (60th) | Anthony McPartlin & Declan Donnelly | Ant & Dec's Saturday Night Takeaway | ITV |
| 2014 (60th) | Charlie Brooker | 10 O'Clock Live | Channel 4 |
| 2014 (60th) | Sarah Millican | The Sarah Millican Television Programme | BBC Two |
| 2014 (60th) | Graham Norton | The Graham Norton Show | BBC One |
2015 (61st)
| 2015 (61st) | Anthony McPartlin & Declan Donnelly | Ant & Dec's Saturday Night Takeaway | ITV |
| 2015 (61st) | Leigh Francis | Celebrity Juice | ITV2 |
| 2015 (61st) | Graham Norton | The Graham Norton Show | BBC One |
| 2015 (61st) | Claudia Winkleman | Strictly Come Dancing | BBC One |
2016 (62nd)
| 2016 (62nd) | Leigh Francis | Celebrity Juice | ITV2 |
| 2016 (62nd) | Stephen Fry | QI | BBC Two |
| 2016 (62nd) | Graham Norton | The Graham Norton Show | BBC One |
| 2016 (62nd) | Romesh Ranganathan | Asian Provocateur | BBC Three |
2017 (63rd)
| 2017 (63rd) | Michael McIntyre | Michael McIntyre's Big Show | BBC One |
| 2017 (63rd) | Adam Hills | The Last Leg | Channel 4 |
| 2017 (63rd) | Graham Norton | The Graham Norton Show | BBC One |
| 2017 (63rd) | Claudia Winkleman | Strictly Come Dancing | BBC One |
2018 (64th)
| 2018 (64th) | Graham Norton | The Graham Norton Show | BBC One |
| 2018 (64th) | Adam Hills | The Last Leg | Channel 4 |
| 2018 (64th) | Michael McIntyre | Michael McIntyre's Big Show | BBC One |
| 2018 (64th) | Sandi Toksvig | QI | BBC Two |
2019 (65th)
| 2019 (65th) | Lee Mack | Would I Lie To You? | BBC One |
| 2019 (65th) | Anthony McPartlin & Declan Donnelly | Ant & Dec's Saturday Night Takeaway | ITV |
| 2019 (65th) | David Mitchell | Would I Lie To You? | BBC One |
| 2019 (65th) | Rachel Parris | The Mash Report | BBC Two |

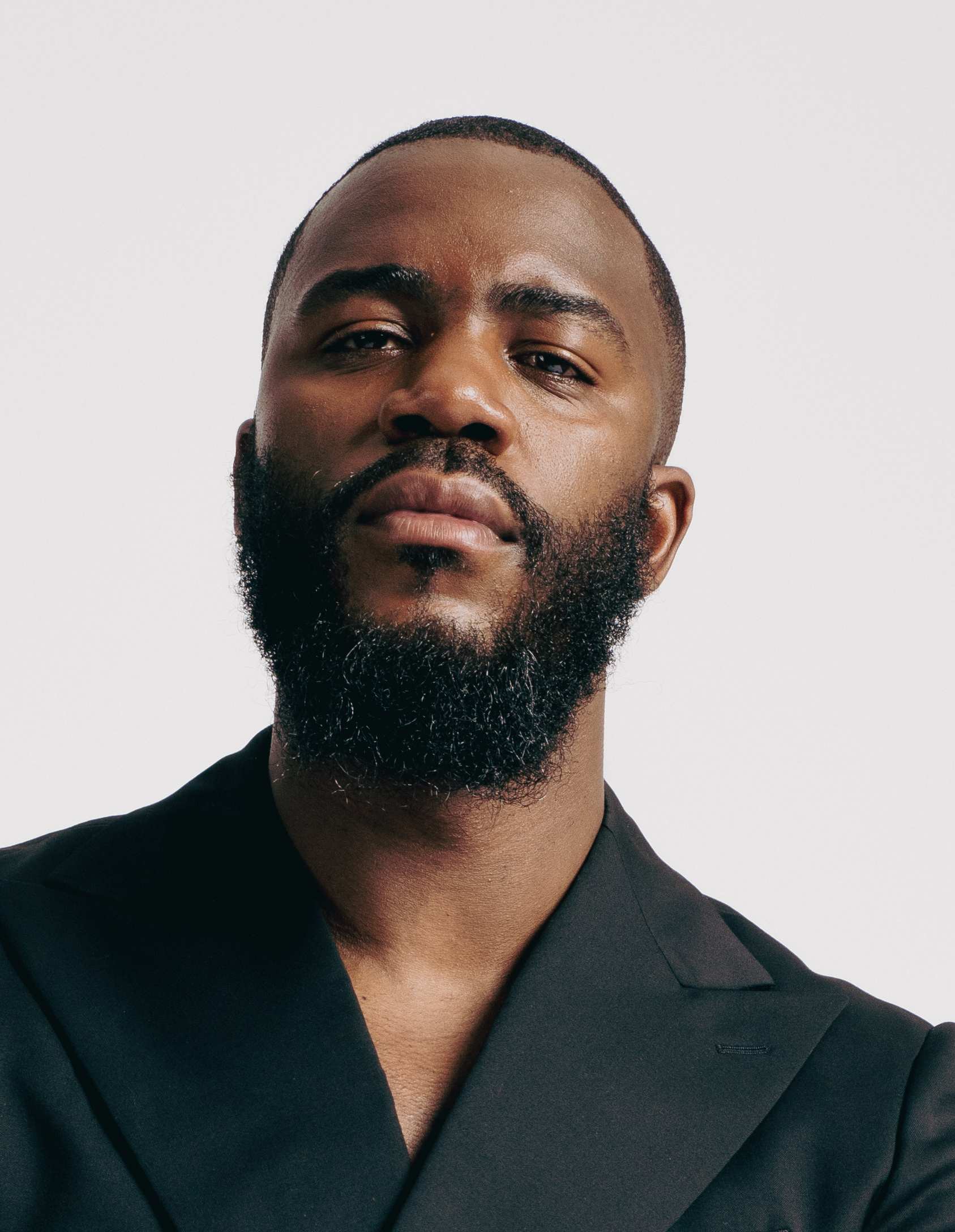
Mo Gilligan won for The Lateish Show with Mo Gilligan in 2020.

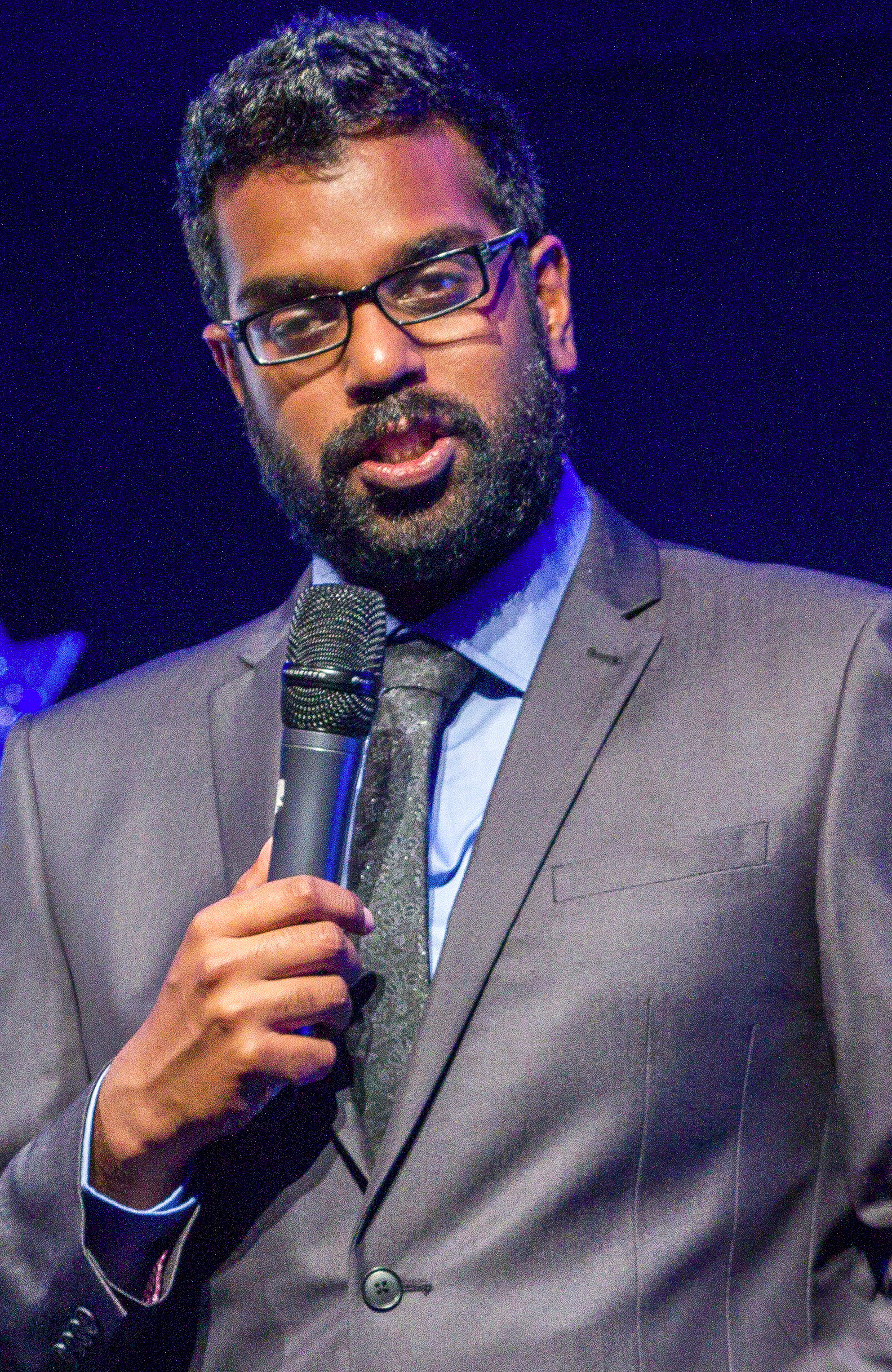
Romesh Ranganathan won for The Ranganation in 2021.

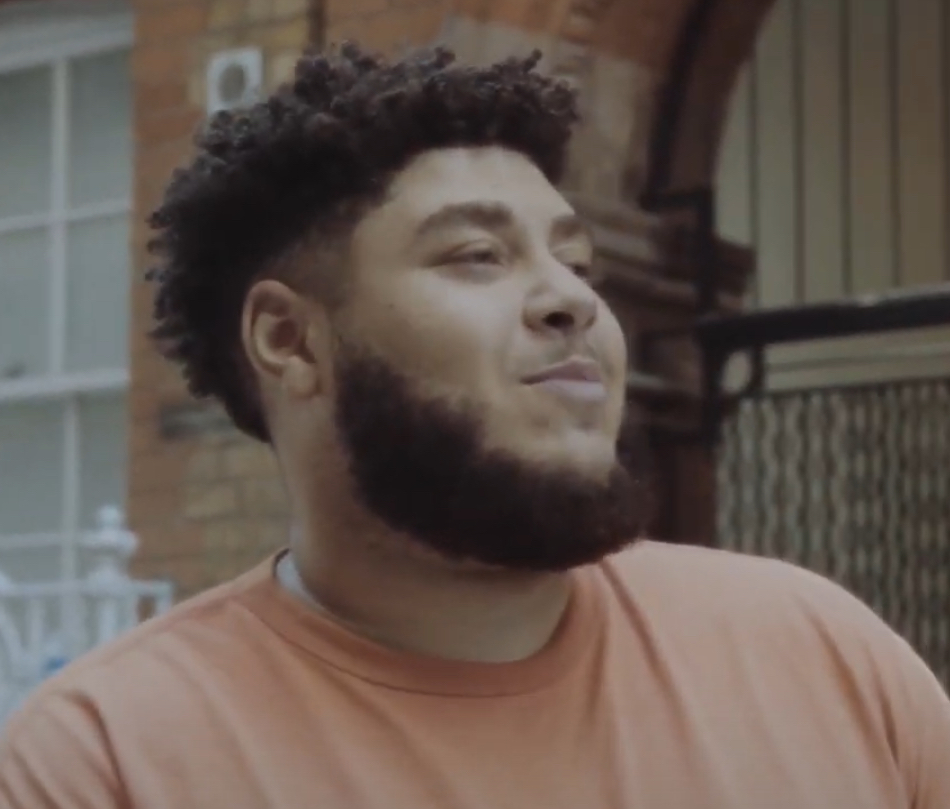
Big Zuu won for Big Zuu's Big Eats in 2022.

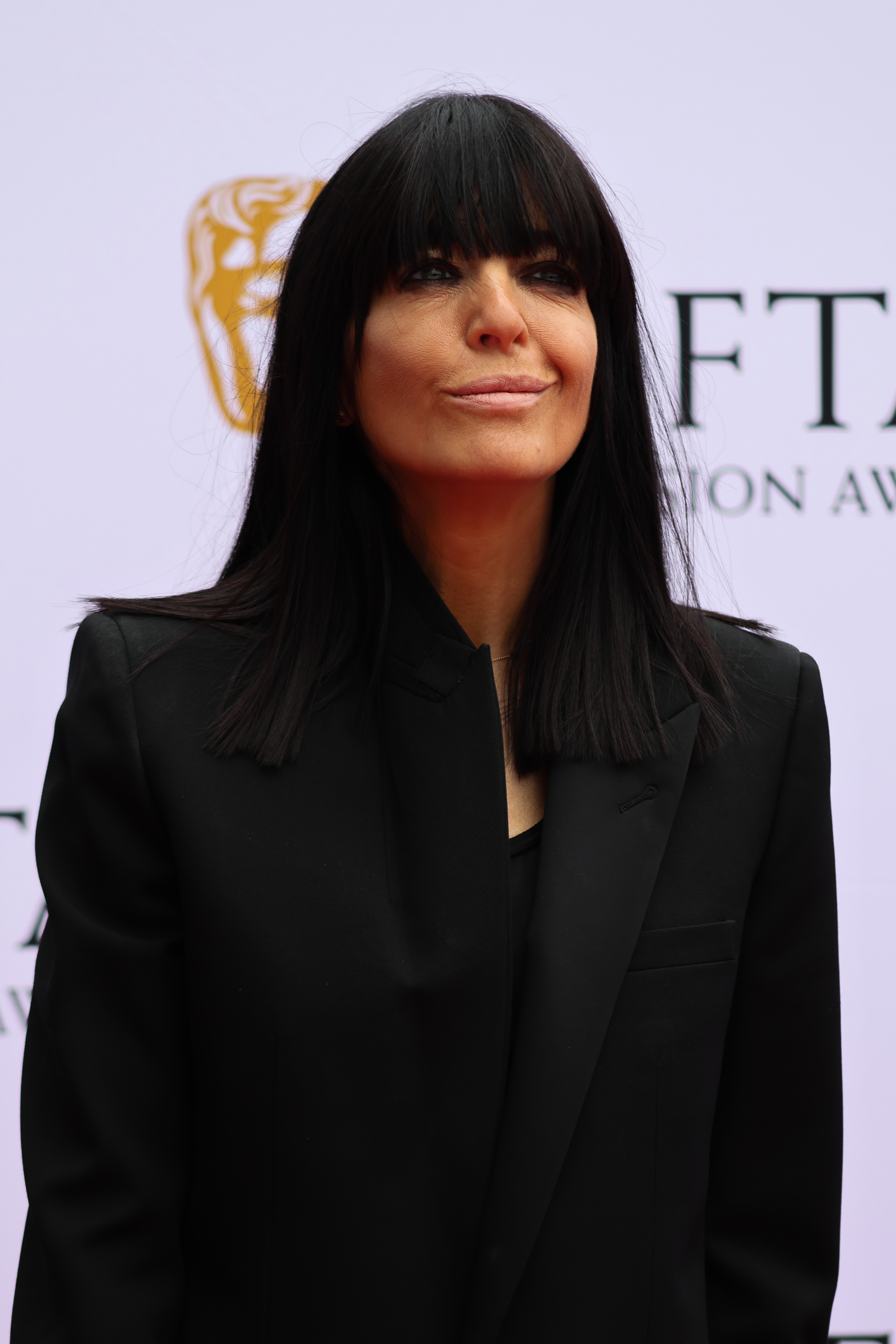
Claudia Winkleman won for The Traitors in 2023.

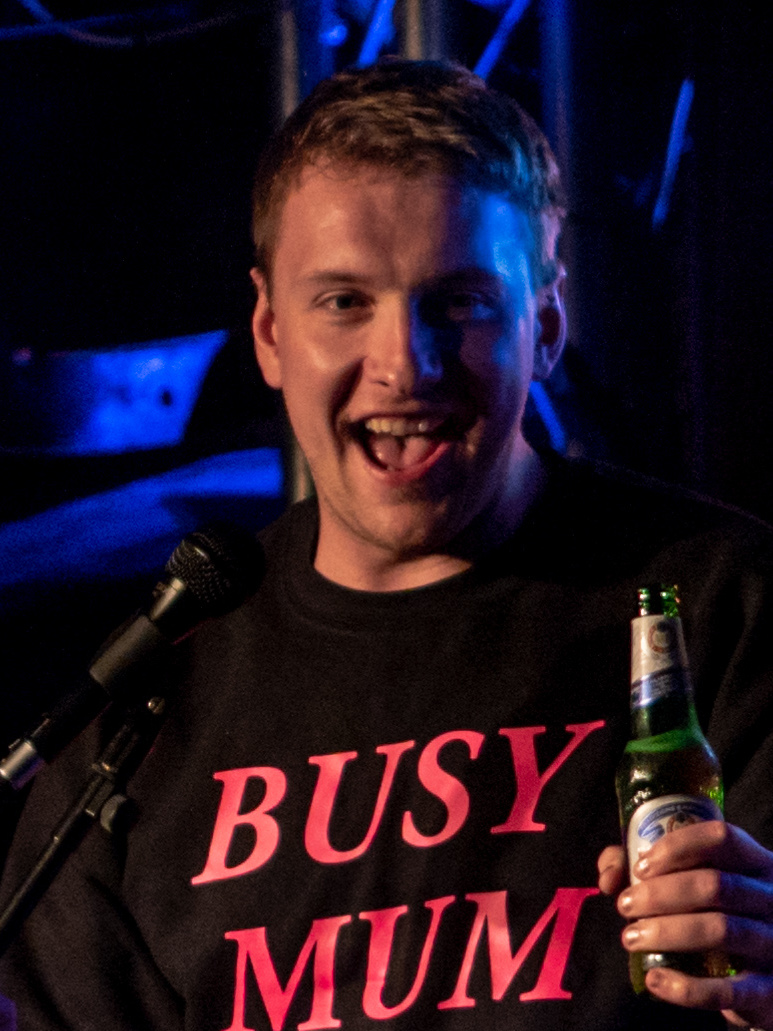
Joe Lycett won for Late Night Lycett in 2024 and 2025.

=== 2020s ===
| Year | Performer | Programme | Network |
|---|---|---|---|
2020 (66th)
| 2020 (66th) | Mo Gilligan | The Lateish Show with Mo Gilligan | Channel 4 |
| 2020 (66th) | Frankie Boyle | Frankie Boyle's New World Order | BBC Two |
| 2020 (66th) | Lee Mack | Would I Lie To You? | BBC One |
| 2020 (66th) | Graham Norton | The Graham Norton Show | BBC One |
2021 (67th)
| 2021 (67th) | Romesh Ranganathan | The Ranganation | BBC Two |
| 2021 (67th) | Adam Hills | The Last Leg | Channel 4 |
| 2021 (67th) | Bradley Walsh | Beat the Chasers | ITV |
| 2021 (67th) | Claudia Winkleman | Strictly Come Dancing | BBC One |
| 2021 (67th) | David Mitchell | Would I Lie to You? at Christmas | BBC One |
| 2021 (67th) | Graham Norton | The Graham Norton Show | BBC One |
2022 (68th)
| 2022 (68th) | Big Zuu | Big Zuu's Big Eats | Dave |
| 2022 (68th) | Alison Hammond | I Can See Your Voice | BBC One |
| 2022 (68th) | Michael McIntyre | Michael McIntyre's The Wheel | BBC One |
| 2022 (68th) | Graham Norton | The Graham Norton Show | BBC One |
| 2022 (68th) | Joe Lycett | Joe Lycett's Got Your Back | Channel 4 |
| 2022 (68th) | Sean Lock | 8 Out of 10 Cats Does Countdown | Channel 4 |
2023 (69th)
| 2023 (69th) | Claudia Winkleman | The Traitors | BBC One |
| 2023 (69th) | Lee Mack | The 1% Club | ITV |
| 2023 (69th) | Mo Gilligan | The Lateish Show with Mo Gilligan | Channel 4 |
| 2023 (69th) | Rosie Jones | Rosie Jones' Trip Hazard | Channel 4 |
| 2023 (69th) | Big Zuu | Big Zuu's Big Eats | Dave |
| 2023 (69th) | Sue Perkins | Sue Perkins: Perfectly Legal | Netflix |
2024 (70th)
| 2024 (70th) | Joe Lycett | Late Night Lycett | Channel 4 |
| 2024 (70th) | Anthony McPartlin and Declan Donnelly | I'm a Celebrity...Get Me Out of Here! | ITV |
| 2024 (70th) | Big Zuu | Big Zuu's Big Eats | Dave |
| 2024 (70th) | Hannah Waddingham | Eurovision Song Contest 2023 | BBC One |
| 2024 (70th) | Graham Norton | The Graham Norton Show | BBC One |
| 2024 (70th) | Rob Beckett & Romesh Ranganathan | Rob & Romesh Vs | Sky Max |
| 2025 (71st) | Joe Lycett | Late Night Lycett | Channel 4 |
| 2025 (71st) | Claudia Winkleman | The Traitors | BBC One |
| 2025 (71st) | Stacey Solomon | Sort Your Life Out | BBC One |
| 2025 (71st) | Graham Norton | The Graham Norton Show | BBC One |
| 2025 (71st) | Anthony McPartlin & Declan Donnelly | Ant & Dec's Saturday Night Takeaway | ITV1 |
| 2025 (71st) | Romesh Ranganathan & Rob Beckett | Rob & Romesh Vs | Sky Max |
| 2026 (72nd) | Bob Mortimer | LOL: Last One Laughing UK | Prime Video |
| 2026 (72nd) | Rob Beckett & Romesh Ranganathan | Rob & Romesh Vs | Sky Max |
| 2026 (72nd) | Alan Carr & Amanda Holden | Amanda and Alan's Spanish Job | BBC One |
| 2026 (72nd) | Lee Mack | The 1% Club | ITV1 |
| 2026 (72nd) | Romesh Ranganathan | Romesh: Can't Knock the Hustle | Sky Max |
| 2026 (72nd) | Claudia Winkleman | The Celebrity Traitors | BBC One |

== Performers with multiple wins and nominations ==
=== Multiple wins ===
The following people have been awarded the British Academy Television Award for Best Entertainment Performance multiple times:

6 wins

- Graham Norton

4 wins

- Ronnie Barker
- Nigel Hawthorne
- Eric Morecambe & Ernie Wise

3 wins

- Anthony McPartlin & Declan Donnelly
- Jonathan Ross

2 wins

- Rowan Atkinson
- Rory Bremner
- Harry Hill
- Richard Wilson
- Victoria Wood
- Joe Lycett

=== Multiple nominations ===
The following people have been nominated for the British Academy Television Award for Best Entertainment Performance multiple times:

16 nominations

- Graham Norton

12 nominations

- Ronnie Barker

11 nominations

- Anthony McPartlin & Declan Donnelly

10 nominations

- Paul Merton

8 nominations

- Stephen Fry

7 nominations

- Rowan Atkinson

6 nominations

- Claudia Winkleman

5 nominations

- Rory Bremner
- Ronnie Corbett
- Harry Hill
- David Jason
- Victoria Wood

4 nominations

- Stanley Baxter
- John Bird & John Fortune
- John Cleese
- Paul Eddington
- Nigel Hawthorne
- Barry Humphries
- Arthur Lowe
- Lee Mack
- Eric Morecambe & Ernie Wise
- Jonathan Ross

3 nominations

- Alan Carr
- Judi Dench
- Adam Hills
- Penelope Keith
- Joe Lycett
- Michael McIntyre
- Leonard Rossiter
- Richard Wilson
- Rob Beckett & Romesh Ranganathan
- Romesh Ranganathan

2 nominations

- Caroline Aherne
- Dave Allen
- Kathy Burke
- Alan Carr
- Angus Deayton
- Leigh Francis
- Dawn French
- Nicholas Lyndhurst
- Sarah Millican
- David Mitchell
- Michael Parkinson
- Patricia Routledge
- Mo Gilligan
- Big Zuu
