= Romesh Ranganathan =

British actor (born 1978)

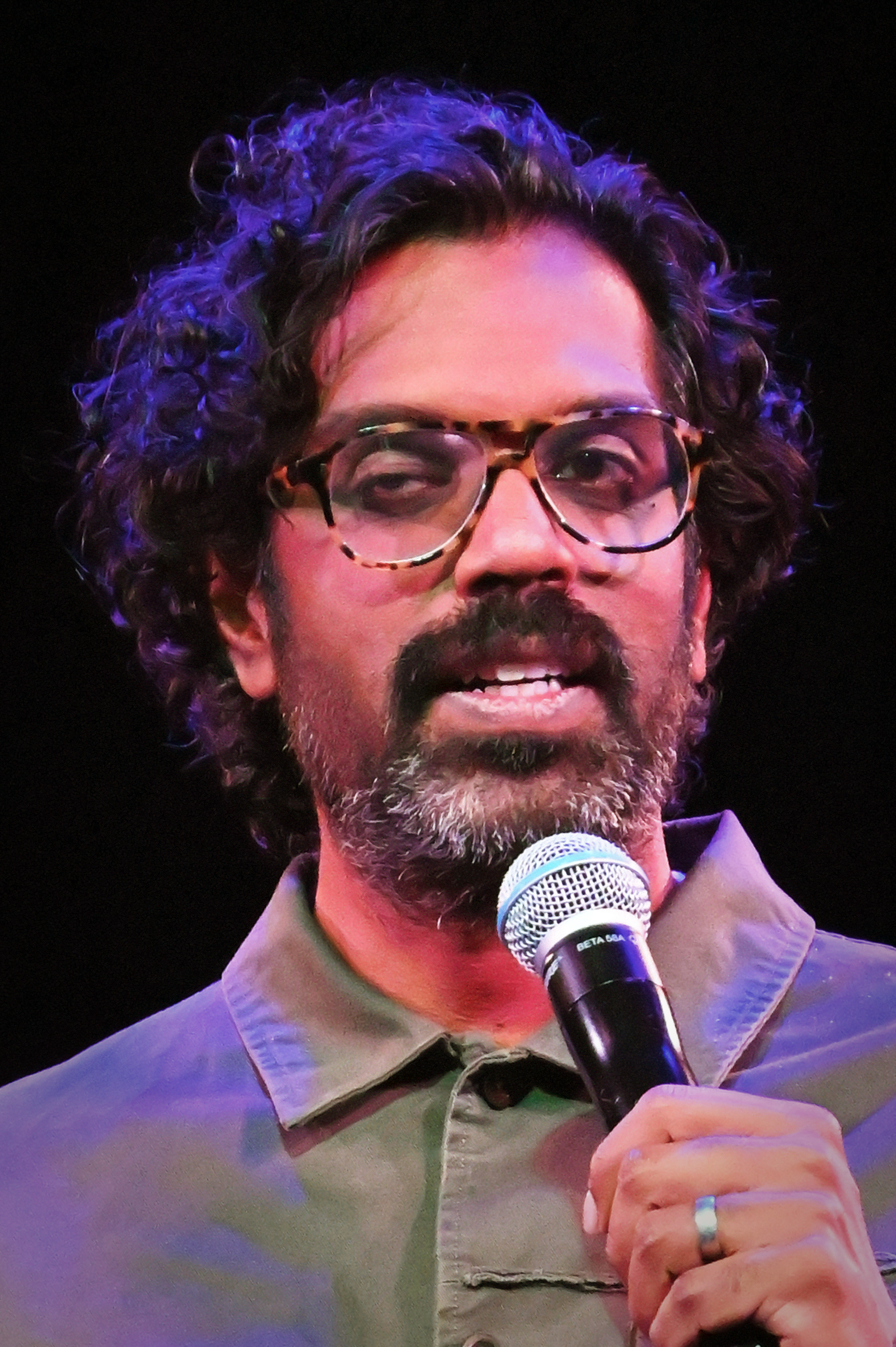
- Ranganathan in 2025
- Born: Jonathan Romesh Ranganathan; 27 March 1978 (age 48); Crawley, West Sussex, England
- Education: Birkbeck, University of London (BSc)
- Occupations: Actor; comedian; presenter
- Years active: 2010–present
- Spouse: Leesa Ranganathan (m. 2010)
- Children: 3
- Website: romeshranganathan.co.uk

Jonathan Romesh Ranganathan (born 27 March 1978) is a British actor, comedian, and presenter. His style of comedy is deadpan and often self-deprecating. His comedy often focuses on his self-defined British "coconut" identity, credited to his upbringing by his mother Shanthi Ranganathan.

Ranganathan has made numerous appearances on television comedy panel shows and has been a regular panellist on The Apprentice: You're Fired!, Play to the Whistle, and The Museum of Curiosity. He completed his first major tour, Irrational Live, in 2016; he performed in large venues such as the Hammersmith Apollo. In 2018, he joined A League of Their Own as a regular panellist. He has presented comedy programmes Judge Romesh and The Ranganation, as well as starring in the travel programme The Misadventures of Romesh Ranganathan. His autobiography, Straight Outta Crawley, was released in 2018. He began hosting the revival of The Weakest Link in 2021.

In 2020, Ranganathan won the BAFTA TV Award for Best Features for The Misadventures of Romesh Ranganathan. In 2021, he won the BAFTA TV Award for Best Entertainment Performance for The Ranganation.

== Early life and education ==
Jonathan Romesh Ranganathan was born in Crawley, West Sussex, on 27 March 1978, the son of Sri Lankan Tamil parents Ranga and Shanthi. He was raised as a Hindu. He had an eye infection as a child that left him with a drooping eyelid and lazy eye on his right side. He has a brother, Dinesh Nathan, who is two years younger. When he was 12, his father encountered financial difficulties and was unable to maintain the mortgage payments on the family home. He was later convicted of fraud and, while Ranganathan was still a teenager, served two years in prison. Ranganathan has said that following his father's death in 2011, he and his younger brother Dinesh had a prolonged rift over the family's financial situation, but later reconciled.

Ranganathan attended the now-closed Forest Grange prep school and then, between 1990 and 1992, was educated at the private Reigate Grammar School. He then attended Crawley's state sector Hazelwick School, before studying mathematics at Birkbeck, University of London.

Before beginning his comedy career, Ranganathan worked as a mathematics teacher at both Hazelwick School and The Beacon School in Banstead. He also engaged in freestyle rap under the stage name Ranga, once reaching the finals of the UK freestyle competition. He began performing comedy while still employed as a teacher.

== Career ==
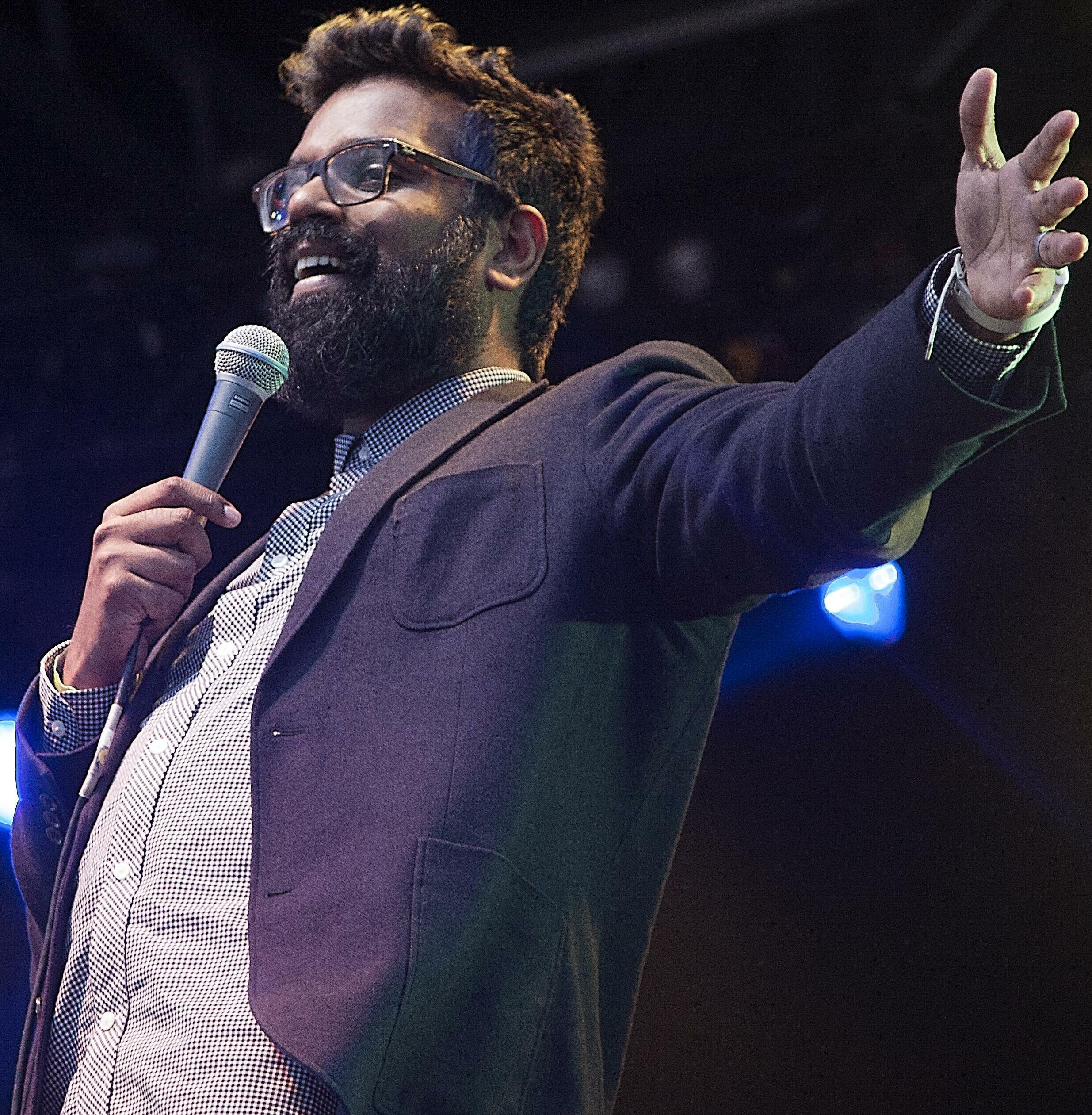
Ranganathan performing in 2015

Ranganathan co-presented It's Not Rocket Science alongside Rachel Riley and Ben Miller in October 2013.

He started presenting Newsjack on Radio 4 Extra in March 2014. He appeared on The Great British Bake Off: An Extra Slice in 2014, during which he presented his home-made vegan chocolate brownies.

He performed at the Royal Variety Performance in 2015, and from September 2015 presented the BBC Three series Asian Provocateur, in which he travelled to Sri Lanka to explore his ancestry, which he later discussed in a BBC Radio interview with Ashanti Omkar on 16 Oct 2016.

In 2018, Ranganathan joined Season 13 of A League of Their Own and starred in his own ten-episode docu-comedy called Just Another Immigrant that premiered on Showtime 8 June 2018.

In December 2021, he began hosting the revival of The Weakest Link, replacing Anne Robinson.

He has been a guest on several episodes of 8 Out of 10 Cats Does Countdown, and has appeared on Would I Lie to You?, Holby City, Soccer AM, Russell Howard's Good News, Sweat the Small Stuff, The Last Leg, Virtually Famous, Have I Got News for You, QI, and Mock the Week. He was a contestant on the first series of Taskmaster and also appeared in the third episode of Jon Richardson Grows Up.

Ranganathan hosts a weekly radio show called For The Love of Hip-Hop on BBC Radio 2. In 2023, he won an Audio and Radio Industry Award for Best Specialist Music Show. On 20 April 2024, he replaced Claudia Winkleman as the host of the lunchtime Saturday BBC Radio 2 show. Ranganathan was the guest in the 185th episode of Cariad Lloyd's podcast, Griefcast.

In August 2024, it was announced that he was set to cameo in Hollyoaks, alongside Rob Beckett in September 2024. In November 2024 he was reported as having become a part-owner of Coughlans Bakery, a local bakery chain in South London, Surrey and West Sussex.

In August 2025, it was announced Ranganathan would be a contestant on the second series of LOL: Last One Laughing UK in 2026.

In December 2025, Ranganathan made his West End stage debut as Bill in Alan Ayckbourn's Woman in Mind opposite Sheridan Smith and directed by Michael Longhurst at the Duke of York's Theatre, before touring to Sunderland Empire Theatre and Theatre Royal, Glasgow in March 2026.

Ranganathan, along with co-contestant Sebastian Croft, won the second series of The Celebrity Traitors in October 2026.

== Awards ==
In 2020, he won the BAFTA TV Award for Best Features for The Misadventures of Romesh Ranganathan.

In 2021, he won the BAFTA TV Award for Best Entertainment Performance for The Ranganation.

== Personal life ==
Ranganathan met his wife, Leesa, while working at Hazelwick School, where she was a drama teacher and he was a mathematics teacher. They married in 2009 and have three sons together.

He was a vegetarian, before going vegan in 2013. He is a supporter of Arsenal FC. He has discussed his "obsession" with tattoos, and is tattooed with the names of his sons alongside images of Richard Pryor, Nas, the Roots, the flag of Albania, BoJack Horseman and the Autobot logo.

Ranganathan's autobiography, Straight Outta Crawley, was published in October 2018. He was still living in Crawley at the time.

In a 2025 interview on Desert Island Discs, Ranganathan spoke candidly about his lifelong struggles with his mental health, including periods of suicidal ideation. He credited running, reading, and breathing exercises with helping him manage his wellbeing.

== Filmography ==
=== Film ===
Year	Title	Role	Notes
2021	Cinderella	Romesh the Mouse	
2023	Chicken Run: Dawn of the Nugget	Nick (voice)	Replacing Timothy Spall
2024	Despicable Me 4	Dr. Nefario (voice)	Cameo; replacing Russell Brand
2026	Minions & Monsters	Dr. Nefario (voice)	Cameo; archival recordings

=== Television ===
Year	Title	Channel	Role	Notes
2013	Live at the Apollo	BBC One	Himself	Series 9, episode 3
2015	Live at the Apollo	BBC One	Himself	Series 11, episode 4
2015	Yonderland	Sky One	Priest	Series 2, Episode 5
2015	Taskmaster	Dave	Himself	Contestant; Series 1
2015	The Apprentice: You're Fired!	BBC Two	Himself	Series 11, regular panellist
2015–2016	Asian Provocateur	BBC Three	Himself	
2017	Anthony Joshua vs Rob & Romesh	Sky One	Co-presenter with Rob Beckett	One-off special
2017	Romesh: Talking to Comedians	BBC Three	Presenter	1 series
2017	Comedy Playhouse: Mister Winner	BBC One	Ajay	One-off comedy
2018	The Misadventures of Romesh Ranganathan	BBC Two	Presenter	4 series and Christmas special
2018	Judge Romesh	Dave	Presenter	2 series
2018	The Reluctant Landlord	Sky One	Romesh	2 series 13 episodes
2018	Romesh's Look Back to the Future	Sky One	Host	One-off comedy panel show
2018	Just Another Immigrant	Showtime	Himself	10 episodes; documentary series
2019	Jamie and Jimmy's Friday Night Feast	Channel Four	Guest	1 episode; 4 January 2019
2019–present	Rob & Romesh Vs...	Sky One	Co-presenter with Rob Beckett	5 series
2019–2022	The Ranganation	BBC Two	Presenter	5 series
2020	Have I Got News for You	BBC One	Guest host	11 December 2020
2020	Sunday Brunch	Channel Four	Guest	13 December 2020
2020	A League of Their Own: Christmas Party 2020	Sky One	Himself	19 December 2020
2020	One Night In... Hamleys	Channel Four	Himself	24 December 2020
2020	King Gary	BBC One	Stuart Williams	Series 1, Christmas Special and Series 2
2021	Staged	BBC One	Himself	
2021	A League of Their Own Roadtrip: Loch Ness to London	Sky One	Himself	8 April 2021
2021	Have I Got News for You	BBC One	Presenter	17 May 2021
2021–present	The Weakest Link	BBC One	Host	New host
2022	DNA Journey	ITV	Himself	29 September 2022
2022	Rob and Romesh vs Christmas On Ice	Sky Max	Himself	Alongside Rob Beckett; 21 December 2022
2022, 2024	The Misinvestigations of Romesh Ranganathan	BBC	Himself	2 series
2022–2024	Avoidance	BBC One	Jonathan	Co-creator & co-writer (second series commissioned)
2023	Romantic Getaway	Sky Comedy	Deacon	Co-writer
2023–2024	British Academy Television Awards	BBC One	Co-host	With Rob Beckett
2024–present	Romesh Ranganathan's Parents’ Evening	ITV	Host	Celebrity game show
2025	Romesh: Can’t Knock the Hustle	Sky Max	Himself	Travelogue series
2026	LOL: Last One Laughing UK	Amazon Prime Video	Himself	Contestant; Series 2
2026	Would You Rather: Decide to Survive	Amazon Prime Video	Host	Reality series
2026	The Celebrity Traitors	BBC One	Himself	Contestant; Series 2

=== Stand-up ===
Year	Title	Role	Notes
2016	Irrational Live	Stand-up	TV special
2019–21	The Cynics Mixtape	Stand-up	Tour
2022	The Cynic	Stand-up	Netflix special
2024	Hustle	Stand-up	Tour
2026	Work In Progress	Stand-up	Tour
2026–27	Romesh Ranganathan Will Change Your Life	Stand-up	Tour

=== Theatre ===
Year	Title	Role	Venue
2025	Inside No. 9 Stage/Fright	Guest star (21 March performance)	Wyndham's Theatre, London
2025	Woman in Mind	Bill	Duke of York's Theatre, London
2026	Woman in Mind	Bill	Sunderland Empire Theatre
2026	Woman in Mind	Bill	Theatre Royal, Glasgow

=== Books ===
Year	Title	Publisher	ISBN	Pages	Notes
2018	Straight Outta Crawley: Memoirs of a Distinctly Average Human	Bantam Press	978-0593078259	272	Ranganathan's first autobiography
2020	As Good As It Gets: Life Lessons from a Reluctant Adult	Bantam Press	978-1787633599	272	
2023	Lil' Muffin Drops the Mic	Puffin Books	978-0241647646	256	Released 20 July 2023
2025	Yasmin Bandara Levels Up!	Puffin Books	978-0241493281	304	Released 10 April 2025

=== Music ===
Year	Title	Record label
2023	Verb T - Four Oh! (Remix) Feat. Doc Brown & Romesh Ranganathan (Prod. Vic Grimes)	High Focus Records

=== Guest appearances ===
- Mock the Week (2013–2017)
- The Great British Bake Off: An Extra Slice (2014)
- Big Fat Quiz of the Year (2016)
- Jamie and Jimmy's Friday Night Feast (2019)
- Hypothetical (2019)
- Jon & Lucy's Christmas Sleepover (2021)
- The Jonathan Ross Show (2022)
- The Lateish Show with Mo Gilligan (2023)

== Awards and nominations ==
Award	Date	Category	Work	Result	Ref.
2019	Royal Television Society Programme Awards	Best Presenter	The Misadventures of Romesh Ranganathan	Won	
2021	Royal Television Society Programme Awards	Best Entertainment Performance	Rob & Romesh Vs	Nominated	
2021	BAFTA TV Awards 2021	Best Entertainment Performance	The Ranganation	Won	
2024	BAFTA TV Awards 2024	Best Entertainment Performance	Rob & Romesh Vs	Nominated	
2024	Royal Television Society Programme Awards	Best Entertainment Performance	Rob & Romesh Vs	Nominated	
2025	BAFTA TV Awards 2025	Best Entertainment Performance	Rob & Romesh Vs	Nominated	
