= The Misadventures of Romesh Ranganathan =

British comedy travel documentary series

- Genre: Travel documentary Comedy
- Directed by: Chris Cottam
- Presented by: Romesh Ranganathan
- Country of origin: United Kingdom
- Original language: English
- No. of series: 4 (+ 1 From my sofa series)
- No. of episodes: 14 (+ 4 From my sofa episodes)

Production
- Executive producers: Emily Hudd, Morgan Roberts
- Producer: Catherine Catton
- Production location: Multiple
- Running time: 60 minutes
- Production company: Rumpus Media

Original release
- Network: BBC Two
- Release: 1 July 2018 – 12 June 2024

The Misadventures of Romesh Ranganathan is a BBC Two comedy travel documentary presented by Romesh Ranganathan. In 2020, it won a British Academy Television Award for Best Features.

The fourth and final series premiered 29 May 2024 on BBC Two and iPlayer.

== Episodes ==
=== Series 1 ===
1. Haiti
2. Ethiopia
3. Albania
4. Christmas (Canadian Arctic with Johnny Issaluk)

=== Series 2 ===
1. Zimbabwe
2. Mongolia
3. Bosnia and Herzegovina
4. Colombia
5. Christmas - The Sahara

=== From my sofa ===
1. Zimbabwe, Bosnia and the Sahara
2. Albania, Mongolia and the Arctic
3. Colombia, Haiti and Ethiopia
4. Christmas - The Hebrides

=== Series 3 ===
1. Sierra Leone
2. Romania

=== Series 4 ===
No. overall	No. in season	Title	Directed by	Written by	Original release date	U.K. viewers (millions)
16	1	"Uganda"	Chris Cottam	Romesh Ranganathan	29 May 2024	N/A
Romesh visits Uganda and is shown around by Bugandan princess Alex. After a brief orientation in the capital Kampala on a boda boda, its off to Jinja for a spot of white water rafting and to find the source of the Nile on the shores of Lake Victoria. They then head out to Queen Elizabeth National Park and Chambura Gorge to see the wildlife and the twin caldera lakes of Kayima and Kamweru. Romesh broaches the recent anti-LGBT law passed by the Ugandan parliament and concedes that the local mindset is completely different to his own. Venturing further into the rural heartland of the country, a trip to a village leaves Romesh inebriated when he samples some Banana Gin. In the final location, Murchison Falls National Park, Romesh visits the ruins of Idi Amin's hunting lodge and discusses the dictator's tenure. At Murchison Falls Romesh observes Hippopotamuses, Crocodiles and Elephants and reflects on his time in the country.
17	2	"Rwanda"	Paul Taylor	Romesh Ranganathan	5 June 2024	N/A
Romesh crosses the border into Rwanda at Gicumbi, and meets his guide, performance artist Hyppolite. On the road to the capital Kigali, Hippo relives his memories of the Rwandan genocide and witnessing his father killed in front of him. In a milk bar, Romesh samples a sip of fermented milk, despite his vegan diet. He notes the spotless streets and learns of the mandatory litter cleaning by the citizenry on the last Saturday of every month (umuganda) and the wholesale ban on plastic bags. En route to a trip to Akagera National Park, Romesh visits a hotel that is destined to house asylum seekers sent by the British government, before trying his hand at making artworks from cow dung. On return to Kigali, Romesh visits the Rwandan Genocide Memorial and learns about the ethnic cleansing of the Tutsis by the Hutu majority but unable to speak freely about the Paul Kagame regime, Romesh and the crew take to a boat to discuss the issues out of earshot. One final excursion sees Romesh visit Volcanoes National Park to observe the mountain gorillas.
18	3	"Madagascar"	Paul Taylor	Romesh Ranganathan	12 June 2024	N/A
Unable to visit the Democratic Republic of the Congo because of the outbreak of civil unrest, Romesh detours to Madagascar. Bic, a diving instructor is on hand to show him around. They start in Antananarivo and after a visit to the street market, head to the Rova Palace. An internal flight takes them to Tsingy on the west coast where they go on a hike to admire the limestone topography. In the backwater of Belo Tsiribihina, Romesh experiences fine dining in the most unusual of circumstances, before heading off to view some lemurs. Romesh learns of Malagsi Fady taboos and the belief that souls of the deceased inhabit Baobab trees. He witnesses a shaman unsuccessfully attempting to make contact. At the Avenue of the Baobabs Romesh learns more about the impact of human influences. In his final vignette from the village of Belo sur Mer, he gets to meet the nomadic Vezo people and goes out to sea on a pirogue where Bic demonstrates his skill at freediving.

== See also ==
- Asian Provocateur
