= Just Another Immigrant =

- Genre: Docuseries
- Directed by: Benjamin Green
- Starring: Romesh Ranganathan
- Composers: Toby Knowles; High Focus Records
- Country of origin: United States
- Original language: English
- No. of seasons: 1
- No. of episodes: 10

Production
- Executive producers: Benjamin Green; Eric Pankowski; Romesh Ranganathan; David Garfinkle; Jay Renfroe
- Cinematography: Sam Hardy
- Editors: Joe Rogan; Gasper Chiriamonte; Matt Silfen
- Running time: 26–29 minutes
- Production companies: Ranga Bee Productions; Renegade; JSA Olive Oil

Original release
- Network: Showtime
- Release: June 8 – July 6, 2018

Just Another Immigrant is an American television docuseries starring Romesh Ranganathan that premiered on June 8, 2018 on Showtime. The series is executive produced by Eric Pankowski, Benjamin Green, David Garfinkle, Jay Renfroe, and Ranganathan.

== Premise ==
Just Another Immigrant follows Ranganathan as he uproots his entire family – his supportive wife, their three kids, his Sri Lankan mother and his eccentric uncle – and immigrates to the U.S. Displaced in Los Angeles, Ranganathan attempts to find success and happiness, while rebuilding a life from scratch. In addition to his efforts to adapt, he has committed himself to booking a U.S. gig – the 6,000-seat Greek Theater – with only three months to sell it out. The series chronicles the true-life adventures of this modern immigrant family and the obstacles of making it in today’s America.

== Production ==
On April 30, 2018, it was announced that Showtime had given the production a series order for a first season consisting of ten episodes. Executive producers include Eric Pankowski, Benjamin Green, Romesh Ranganathan, David Garfinkle, and Jay Renfroe, with Green directing. Production companies involved with the series include Ranga Bee Productions, JSA Olive Oil and Renegade.

== Episodes ==
No.	Title	Directed by	Written by	Original release date
1	"The Arrival"	Benjamin Green	David Young	June 8, 2018
2	"The Uncle"	Benjamin Green	David Young	June 8, 2018
3	"The Family"	Benjamin Green	David Young	June 15, 2018
4	"The TV Debut"	Benjamin Green	David Young	June 15, 2018
5	"The Mom"	Benjamin Green	David Young	June 22, 2018
6	"The Money Issue"	Benjamin Green	David Young	June 22, 2018
7	"The Focus Group"	Benjamin Green	David Young	June 29, 2018
8	"The Corden Favor"	Benjamin Green	David Young	June 29, 2018
9	"The Final Push"	Benjamin Green	David Young	July 6, 2018
10	"The Greek"	Benjamin Green	David Young	July 6, 2018
