= Asian Provocateur =

British television series

- Genre: Travel documentary; Comedy
- Starring: Romesh Ranganathan
- Country of origin: United Kingdom
- Original language: English
- No. of series: 2
- No. of episodes: 12

Production
- Production locations: Canada; Mexico; Sri Lanka; United Kingdom; United States

Original release
- Network: BBC Three
- Release: 30 September 2015 – 16 November 2016

Asian Provocateur is a British comedy travel documentary television series shown on the BBC. In 2015, comedian Romesh Ranganathan reluctantly travels to Sri Lanka after his mother, Shanthi, tells him that he is a "coconut" (Note: A brown person of South Asian descent that is perceived as fully assimilated into Western culture. May be offensive or used for comedic effect. See list of ethnic slurs.) and that he should meet his relatives who live there and learn about his parents' country—including its culture, religion, and language.

In 2016, a second series, Mum's American Dream, was broadcast on BBC One.

== Series 1 (2015) ==
=== Episode 1: Uncle Thiru ===
- Air date 30 September

Romesh is sent to receive a traditional blessing in Kegalle, which involves a chicken being rubbed on his head in a ceremony which is black magic rather than Hindu. Romesh meets a distant relative, Thiru, who wants Romesh to invest in his business making paper out of elephant dung. Romesh performs rap in Colombo with local group MBZ, and is badly received by the group, who insult him.

=== Episode 2: Uncle Ragu ===
- Air date 7 October

Romesh visits his Uncle Ragu, in Batticaloa, and go to a village where many of their relatives live. They travel to Kataragama to attend a religious festival.

=== Episode 3: Uncle Rubaharan ===
- Air date 14 October

Romesh meets Shanthi's cousin Rubaharan. He introduces Romesh to the ancient martial art of angapora; Romesh loses a fight against a 14-year-old boy. Romesh has an Ayurvedic enema. He then visits a house which his mother owns and rents out to a religious sect. The tenants encourage him to carry out repairs on the house. He collects honey with Veddas.

=== Episode 4: Cousin Krishna ===
- Air date 21 October

Romesh meets his 12 year old cousin, Krishna, who is more intelligent, honest and mature than him. They teach at a school, work at a hotel and perform a Kandyan dance. Romesh drives an auto rickshaw.

=== Episode 5: King Kong ===
- Air date 28 October

Romesh is tasked with fulfilling a lifelong dream of his mother by performing in a Tamil soap opera. He does not manage to be hired to act, so he makes a film himself with Ragu, having hired the cast (including King Kong) themselves.

=== Episode 6: Shanthi's Return ===
- Air date 4 November

Shanthi heads out to Sri Lanka so see what Romesh has learnt and becomes furious when she realises he has been lying a lot. They go to his aunt's matchmaking service and try to find a date for an actor whom the agency have been unable to find a date for. They appear in a music video with MBZ.

== Series 2 (2016) ==
=== Episode 1: Cousin Pratheep ===
- Air date 12 October

Romesh and Shanthi meet cousin Pratheep in Tampa, Florida. He fails in his attempt to put her into a retirement community for the week, before letting her share his hotel room. Romesh competes in an eating contest, before quitting. He joins a group of locals who are into monster trucks and firing guns. He then takes part in a frat party initiation, before joining a gospel choir.

=== Episode 2: The Family Reunion ===
- Air date 19 October

Romesh and Shanthi go to Toronto, Canada for a family reunion. He and his seven-year-old cousin Shaun perform breakdancing at Shaun's primary school. Romesh invites Ragu, who arranges for him to be interviewed by online TV station, Naked News. They go a survival trip, in which Ragu surprises Romesh by having him kidnapped. Romesh takes Shanthi to a glacier to see the Northern Lights, despite the fact that he knows there is no chance of seeing them due to cloud cover.

=== Episode 3: Brother Dinesh ===
- Air date 26 October

Romesh and Shanthi tour the Deep South with Romesh's younger brother, Dinesh and their uncle Guru. The brothers wrestle in New Orleans and travel in an RV to Mississippi, where Dinesh fishes for catfish. Romesh joins a group of male cheerleaders in Alabama. Dinesh does a sky dive.

=== Episode 4: Cousin Krishna Returns ===
- Air date 2 November

Romesh hangs out with his cousin Krishna at a cowboy ranch in Colorado, where Romesh does badly. Romesh helps administer medical treatment to an alligator. They meet a vigilante who patrols a park alone in a superhero costume. They go a bowling alley where with Romesh's encouragement, Krishna approaches and talks to a girl. Krishna's mother Saroja disapproves, thinking it inappropriate.

=== Episode 5: Uncle Ragu Returns ===
- Air date 9 November

Romesh tours Mexico with his uncle Ragu. They take part in a simulated illegal Mexico-US border crossing. They go to a 1980s-themed nightclub in Mexico City. They go to a shaman for a blessing ceremony.

=== Episode 6: The De Silva Cousins ===
- Air date 16 November

In their final week, Romesh and Shanthi visit the De Silva cousins. Romesh is disappointed when a trip in a lowrider turns into Shanthi's shopping trip. Romesh and Shanthi become private detectives and meet a drug dealer; Romesh is disappointed when he finds out afterwards that it was faked and that Shanthi was aware of that all along. Romesh and Shanthi go to San Diego Comic-Con. Romesh and Shanthi star in a trailer for a non-existent superhero film.

== See also ==
- The Misadventures of Romesh Ranganathan
