= Rob & Romesh Vs =

British television series

- Genre: Comedy; Entertainment; Sports
- Presented by: Rob Beckett; Romesh Ranganathan
- Country of origin: United Kingdom
- Original language: English
- No. of series: 9
- No. of episodes: 45

Production
- Running time: 60 mins
- Production company: CPL Productions

Original release
- Network: Sky One (series 1–3, 9); Sky Max (series 4–8)
- Release: 25 January 2019 – present

Rob and Romesh Vs… is a British light entertainment comedy television series created for Sky Television in which comedians Rob Beckett and Romesh Ranganathan attempt to immerse themselves into unfamiliar aspects of the worlds of sport and entertainment. The show was first broadcast on Sky One in January 2019 following a one-off special in April 2017 titled Anthony Joshua vs Rob & Romesh in which the pair met the heavyweight boxer ahead of his world title fight with Wladimir Klitschko. Guests have included the England national football team, Andy Murray, and Usain Bolt. The Guardian described the show as “comedic guinea pigs Rob Beckett and Romesh Ranganathan continue to try their hands at learning new skills, coached by professionals”. Starting with the fourth series, the show moved to Sky Max until its closure, and returned to the relaunched Sky One beginning with the ninth series.

== Episodes ==
Series	Episodes	Originally released		
Series	Episodes	First released	Last released	Network
1	6	25 January 2019	1 March 2019	Sky One
2	4	5 May 2020	26 May 2020	Sky One
3	7	4 February 2021	29 July 2021	Sky One
3	Special	19 December 2021		Sky Max
4	4	28 April 2022	19 May 2022	Sky Max
4	Specials	16 November 2022	21 December 2022	Sky Max
5	4	19 July 2023	9 August 2023	Sky Max
5	Special	17 December 2023		Sky Max
6	2	15 February 2024	22 February 2024	Sky Max
7	3	28 August 2024	11 September 2024	Sky Max
7	Special	31 December 2024		Sky Max
8	4	9 December 2025	30 December 2025	Sky Max
8	Specials	15 January 2026	22 January 2026	Sky Max
9	4	14 October 2026	4 November 2026	Sky One

=== Series 1 (2019) ===
No. overall	No. in series	Rob & Romesh Vs...	Guest(s)	Original release date
1	1	"Usain Bolt"	Usain Bolt	25 January 2019
Comedian mates Rob Beckett and Romesh Ranganathan head to Jamaica to meet sprint legend Usain Bolt - the fastest man ever to have lived.
2	2	"The NFL"	Rick Lovato, Jay Ajayi	1 February 2019
Rob and Romesh meet and train with some of the NFL's biggest stars. Then, they get kitted up for a match in front of 80,000 people.
3	3	"Fashion"	David Gandy, Gok Wan, Nicky Johnston, Max Rogers, Caroline Perino	8 February 2019
Rob and Romesh strut their stuff on the catwalk and meet male model David Gandy. Then, it's off to NYC to try and bag a gig on a real-life runway.
4	4	"Superstar DJs"	Jonas Blue, Andy C, Chase & Status, DJ Yoda	15 February 2019
Rob and Romesh dance into the jet-setting, deck-spinning world of superstar DJs as they meet some of the world's greatest mixmasters.
5	5	"Country Music"	Shania Twain, Meghan Linsey, Tyler Cain	22 February 2019
There's more laughs as mates Rob and Romesh meet up with Shania Twain, head to Nashville and perform their very own country song.
6	6	"Anthony Joshua: Revisited"	Anthony Joshua, Michael Buffer, Tony Bellew, Adam Smith	1 March 2019
The boys meet heavyweight champ Anthony Joshua, watch him in action and chat to his boxer mate Tony Bellew.

=== Series 2 (2020) ===
No. overall	No. in series	Rob & Romesh Vs...	Guest(s)	Original release date
7	1	"Ballet"	Carlos Acosta, Marion Tait, Tyrone Singleton, Dominic Antonucci	5 May 2020
Best friends Rob Beckett and Romesh Ranganathan are back as they dive into the world of ballet, including roles in a real performance of Swan Lake.
8	2	"NBA Basketball"	Salif Gueye, Nick Anson, Jan Žnidaršič, Nik Schwarzmann	12 May 2020
Rob and Romesh learn about basketball, a journey that takes them from the street courts of Los Angeles to the iconic Staples Center itself.
9	3	"Cricket: South Africa"	Kevin Pietersen	19 May 2020
The guys go to South Africa to follow England's cricket team. There's commentary, a lesson with Kevin Pietersen - and even a safari.
10	4	"Cricket: The Test"	Kevin Pietersen, Nasser Hussain, Darren Gough, Neil Manthorp, Jonny Bairstow, Jack Leach, Chris Millard, Matt Parkinson	26 May 2020
Part two of the tour for cricket newbies Rob and Romesh as they follow England's Test series. The match comes to a dramatic finale.

=== Series 3 (2021) ===
No. overall	No. in series	Rob & Romesh Vs...	Guest(s)	Original release date
11	1	"Art"	Lachlan Goudie, Quilla Constance, Robin George, Rob Pepper	4 February 2021
Rob and Romesh are back to dip their toes into the unknown, as the duo become budding artists tasked with creating an exhibition for the Saatchi Gallery.
12	2	"Golf"	Marcus Armitage, Andrew 'Beef' Johnston, Justin Rose	11 February 2021
With a round at the iconic St Andrews and a lesson from Justin Rose as enticement, Rob tries to convince Romesh to share his love of golf.
13	3	"Drag"	Alan Carr, The Vivienne, Baga Chipz, Michelle Visage, Dolly Trolley, Cara Melle	18 February 2021
With the help of the likes of Drag Race stars Michelle Visage and The Vivienne, Rob and Romesh dive into the world of drag performing.
14	4	"Andy Murray"	Andy Murray, Jamie Delgado, Matt Little	8 July 2021
The comedy duo serve up a special with Sir Andy Murray, as he pushes them to the limit in a tennis session and takes them out road cycling.
15	5	"Team GB: Part 1"	Mallory Franklin, Kimberley Woods, Sarah Davies, Emily Campbell, Maddie Hinch, Amy Tennant, Amy Costello, Sarah Evans, Sarah Jones, Hannah Martin, Chris Murray, Emily Muskett, Lizzie Neal, Sarah Robertson, Haroon Siraj, Anna Toman, Jennifer Tong, Laura Unsworth	15 July 2021
It's Olympic year, so Rob and Romesh try their hand at weightlifting, hockey and slalom canoe to see if they too could be part of Team GB.
16	6	"Team GB: Part 2"	Max Whitlock, Denise Lewis, Taylor Campbell, Aaron Heading, Georgina Roberts	22 July 2021
Rob and Romesh continue their Olympic adventure as they try clay pigeon shooting, gymnastics and athletics, with help from special teachers.
17	7	"Almost Everything"	N/A	29 July 2021
Highlights from across the series as Rob Beckett and Romesh Ranganathan try their hand at everything from art to golf and tennis to drag performance.
Special
18	–	"Christmas"	Martin Burton, Mattie Faint	19 December 2021
Rob asked (on Instagram), and the people have spoken, sending our favourite double act to the circus to prepare for a high-flying Christmas extravaganza.

=== Series 4 (2022) ===
No. overall	No. in series	Rob & Romesh Vs...	Guest(s)	Original release date
19	1	"Strongman"	Eddie Hall, Magnús Ver Magnússon	28 April 2022
Rob and Romesh witness insane strength as they take on the world of Strongman, travelling to train with former champion Magnús Ver Magnússon.
20	2	"West End Musicals"	Samantha Barks, Michael O'Donnell, Mark Roper, Thenjiwe Nofemele, Simone Manfredini, Francisco Lins, Jamie McGregor	5 May 2022
Rob and Romesh try to crack the world of musicals and land a role in a big-budget show. Can West End leading lady Samantha Barks pull some strings?
21	3	"Restaurants: First Course"	Tom Kerridge, Matthew O'Connor, Tony Rodd, Becky Cummings, Robert Parks, Dan Scott, Anthony Peart	12 May 2022
Rob and Romesh learn all about the restaurant industry as they try to open their own restaurant.
22	4	"Restaurants: Second Course"	DJ Yoda, Tom Kerridge, Becky Cummings, Angela Hartnett, Jay Rayner, Grace Dent	19 May 2022
Rob and Romesh's journey into the restaurant business continues with the boys opening London's very first hip-hop curry house.
Specials
23	–	"The Three Lions"	Mason Mount, Jude Bellingham, Gareth Southgate, Harry Kane, Jordan Pickford, Kyle Walker	16 November 2022
Rob Beckett and Romesh Ranganathan meet the stars of the England football team before the World Cup, and hang out with Gareth Southgate.
24	–	"Christmas on Ice"	Hannah Dolan Davies, Jackie Soames	21 December 2022
The votes are in for 2022's Christmas challenge and Rob and Romesh are ready. Their task - to get their skates on with Mickey and co in Disney on Ice.

=== Series 5 (2023) ===
No. overall	No. in series	Rob & Romesh Vs...	Guest(s)	Original release date
25	1	"Magic in Vegas"	Penn and Teller, Jeff McBride, Nathan Santucci	19 July 2023
Rob and Romesh are invited by Penn & Teller to join Vegas's longest-running residency show and have just three days to pull their act together.
26	2	"K-pop"	Cheri Yun, Differ Kim, Nara Kim, TRI.BE	26 July 2023
Rob and Romesh enter the world of the music phenomenon of K-Pop. They start their journey at a sold-out NCT Dream gig at Wembley Arena, then head to South Korea to learn about the genre.
27	3	"Crufts"	Ashleigh Butler, Joe Lamont, Clare Balding, Lauren Phillips	2 August 2023
Rob and Romesh enter their pets in Crufts to see if their new best friends can learn a thing or two. Seven-time Crufts champion and Britain's Got Talent star Ashleigh Butler acts as their guide as they training their dogs and teach them the key principles of dog training ahead of competing in the agility tournament at the event.
28	4	"Classical Music"	Jess Gillam, Maurizio Leoni, Matthew Lynch, Toby Spence, Simon Carrington	9 August 2023
Rob and Romesh are invited to join the London Philharmonic Orchestra for the final night of a year-long residency at the Royal Festival Hall. The comedians learn various roles in the orchestra - from conducting to opera - before they face their final challenge at the sold-out venue.
Special
29	–	"Lapland"	N/A	17 December 2023
Rob and Romesh head to Lapland for Christmas, where they try their luck at a range of festive-themed tasks featuring elves, reindeer, magic and Santa Claus to see if there's one activity that they have the Christmas spirit for.

=== Series 6 (2024) ===
No. overall	No. in series	Rob & Romesh Vs...	Guest(s)	Original release date
30	1	"F1: Monaco - Part 1"	Lewis Hamilton, George Russell, Toto Wolff, Damon Hill	15 February 2024
Rob and Romesh enter the world of Formula One, hanging out with the Mercedes team at the Monaco GP, where they meet drivers Sir Lewis Hamilton and George Russell. They also spend time with team principal Toto Wolff, who puts them through their paces to see if they have what it takes to get a job on the team.
31	2	"F1: Monaco - Part 2"	George Russell, Toto Wolff, Damon Hill	22 February 2024
Rob Beckett and Romesh Ranganathan continue their Formula 1 journey in Monaco, hanging out with driver George Russell, before Rob finally takes his manual driving test.

=== Series 7 (2024) ===
No. overall	No. in series	Rob & Romesh Vs...	Guest(s)	Original release date
32	1	"Hollywood Stunts"	Ryan Gosling, Emily Blunt, David Leitch	28 August 2024
Rob Beckett and Romesh Ranganathan take on more challenges, beginning by heading off to Los Angeles to throw themselves into the world of Hollywood stuntmen. They meet The Fall Guy stars Ryan Gosling and Emily Blunt before training with the film's director David Leitch, then head back to the UK to perform a stunt on Hollyoaks.
33	2	"Heavy Metal"	Bleed From Within, Wheatus, Queens of the Stone Age	4 September 2024
Scottish band Bleed From Within try to educate Rob Beckett and Romesh Ranganathan in the ways of the headbanger in time for a surprise performance of Metallica's Enter Sandman at the Download festival in front of 4,000 fans. The boys also get some extra tips from US rock stars Wheatus and Queens of the Stone Age.
34	3	"UFC"	Michael Bisping, Leon Edwards	11 September 2024
Comedians Rob Beckett and Romesh Ranganathan enter the world of mixed martial arts, visiting the Ultimate Fighting Championship's International Fight Week in Las Vegas to train with the stars before taking on a one-on-one UFC challenge on top of the Eiffel Tower.
Special
35	–	"Darts"	Luke Littler	31 December 2024
Rob Beckett and Romesh Ranganathan meet professionals including Luke Littler as they prepare to play a match at Alexandra Palace during the PDC World Darts Championship.

=== Series 8 (2025–26) ===
No. overall	No. in series	Rob & Romesh Vs...	Guest(s)	Original release date
36	1	"Bollywood"	Ali Fazal, Anupam Kher, Rick Roy	9 December 2025
Having dipped their toes in the pond of Hollywood, Rob and Romesh journey to Mumbai with a new goal: breaking into Bollywood.
37	2	"Hip Hop"	Raekwon	16 December 2025
Romesh guides Rob through Hip Hop culture with a journey to New York, exploring key sites and experiences in the genre's hometown.
38	3	"The Jungle"	N/A	23 December 2025
Rob Beckett and Romesh Ranganathan venture into the depths of the Sumatran jungle to find out if they can take a photo worth of entry to Wildlife Photographer of the Year.
39	4	"Shakespeare"	Jessie Buckley, Martin Freeman, Paul Ready, Michelle Terry	30 December 2025
Rob and Romesh prepare to perform Romeo and Juliet at the world-famous Globe Theatre. With the help of the Globe's Artistic Director, Michelle Terry, and some of the nation's finest actors, the lads will be put their acting skills to the test to find out if they can pull off one of Shakespeare's most famous plays.
Specials
40	–	"Winter Olympics - Part 1"	Eddie the Eagle, Eve Muirhead, Mia Brookes, Bruce Mouat	15 January 2026
41	–	"Winter Olympics - Part 2"	N/A	22 January 2026

=== Series 9 (2026) ===
No. overall	No. in series	Rob & Romesh Vs...	Guest(s)	Original release date
42	1	"Kung Fu"	Jet Li	14 October 2026
43	2	"Tour de France"	Josh Widdicombe, Tom Davis, Mark Cavendish	21 October 2026
44	3	"Supernatural"	N/A	28 October 2026
45	4	"Bowling"	Kyle Troup, Tyler Troup, Guppy Troup	4 November 2026

== Production ==
The show is produced by CPL Productions. Rob Beckett told the Royal Television Society that the original idea was to pair him and a non-boxing fan to meet Anthony Joshua and Romesh was chosen as his friend who knew nothing about boxing with the two having met and befriended on the UK comedy circuit. Ranganathan explained that the original idea was just to cover sports “but it soon became clear that if we immerse ourselves in any kind of world you’re always going to get something from it.” Beckett explained that they “commit to it. We don’t just fake it for telly. We’re not going through the motions.”

== Accolades ==
The show was nominated in the Entertainment Performance category at the 2021 Royal Television Society Programme Awards. The show was also nominated for best comedy entertainment series at the 2022 National Comedy Awards. The show won the Best Comedy Entertainment category at the 2024 Royal Television Society Programme Awards, with Rob and Romesh nominated for Best Comedy Performance category. In March 2024, the series was nominated for Comedy entertainment programme and Beckett and Ranganathan were nominated in the Entertainment performance category at the 2024 British Academy Television Awards. In March 2025, Beckett and Ranganathan were nominated for Best Comedy Performance at the 2025 and 2026 British Academy Television Awards. Beckett and Ranganathan were nominated for Best Entertainment Performance at the 2026 Royal Television Society Programme Awards.
