= 1995–96 UEFA Cup Winners' Cup =

- Dates: 10 August 1995 – 8 May 1996

Final positions
- Champions: (France) Paris Saint-Germain (1st title)
- Runners-up: (Austria) Rapid Wien

Tournament statistics
- Matches played: 83
- Goals scored: 251 (3.02 per match)
- Attendance: 1,277,014 (15,386 per match)
- Top scorer(s): Petr Samec (Hradec Králové); 9 goals

The 1995–96 season of the UEFA Cup Winners' Cup was won by Paris Saint-Germain 1–0 in the final against Austrian entrants Rapid Wien in Brussels on 8 May 1996.

The 1995–96 season also saw the return of Yugoslav clubs on the international scene after a three-year ban due to a UN embargo. However, the finalist of Yugoslav national cup, FK Obilić, was eliminated in the qualifying round.

== Teams ==
Location of teams competing in the 1995–96 UEFA Cup Winners' Cup first round.
Yellow: Did not qualify from qualifying round; Red: Qualified for first round.

First round
(Spain) Zaragoza^{TH}	(Spain) Deportivo La Coruña	(Belgium) Club Brugge	(Greece) AEK Athens
(Italy) Parma	(England) Everton	(Netherlands) Feyenoord	(Denmark) Copenhagen
(France) Paris Saint-Germain	(Portugal) Sporting CP	(Turkey) Trabzonspor	(Sweden) Halmstad
(Germany) Borussia Mönchengladbach	(Russia) Dynamo Moscow	(Austria) Rapid Wien	(Scotland) Celtic
Qualifying round
(Switzerland) Sion	(Poland) GKS Katowice	(Romania) Petrolul Ploiești	(Norway) Molde
(Israel) Maccabi Haifa	(Hungary) Vác FC Samsung	(Cyprus) APOEL	(Ukraine) Shakhtar Donetsk
(Georgia (country)) Dinamo Batumi	(Iceland) KR	(Latvia) DAG Liepāja	(Finland) TPS
(Slovakia) Inter Bratislava	(Slovenia) Mura	(Bulgaria) Lokomotiv Sofia	(Czech Republic) Hradec Králové
(Wales) Wrexham	(Northern Ireland) Linfield	(Republic of Ireland) Derry City	(Belarus) Dinamo-93 Minsk
(Malta) Valletta	(Albania) Teuta Durrës	(Liechtenstein) Vaduz	(Lithuania) Žalgiris Vilnius
(Luxembourg) Grevenmacher	(Faroe Islands) KÍ	(North Macedonia) Sileks	(Armenia) Ararat Yerevan
(Moldova) Tiligul Tiraspol	(Estonia) Lantana Tallinn	(Azerbaijan) Neftçi	(Federal Republic of Yugoslavia) Obilić

^{TH} Title Holders

== Qualifying round ==
Team 1	Agg.	Team 2	1st leg	2nd leg
Tiligul Tiraspol (Moldova)	2–3	(Switzerland) Sion	0–0	2–3
Vác FC Samsung (Hungary)	2–4	(North Macedonia) Sileks	1–1	1–3
TPS (Finland)	1–3	(Albania) Teuta Durrës	1–0	0–3
Vaduz (Liechtenstein)	1–14	(Czech Republic) Hradec Králové	0–5	1–9
APOEL (Cyprus)	3–0	(Azerbaijan) Neftçi	3–0	0–0
Wrexham (Wales)	0–1	(Romania) Petrolul Ploiești	0–0	0–1
Valletta (Malta)	2–5	(Slovakia) Inter Bratislava	0–0	2–5
Shakhtar Donetsk (Ukraine)	5–1	(Northern Ireland) Linfield	4–1	1–0
Žalgiris Vilnius (Lithuania)	3–2	(Slovenia) Mura	2–0	1–2
GKS Katowice (Poland)	2–2 (4–5 p)	(Armenia) Ararat Yerevan	2–0	0–2 (aet)
Obilić (Federal Republic of Yugoslavia)	2–3	(Georgia (country)) Dinamo Batumi	0–1	2–2
Derry City (Republic of Ireland)	1–2	(Bulgaria) Lokomotiv Sofia	1–0	0–2
Maccabi Haifa (Israel)	6–3	(Faroe Islands) KÍ	4–0	2–3
Dinamo-93 Minsk (Belarus)	2–3	(Norway) Molde	1–1	1–2
Grevenmacher (Luxembourg)	3–4	(Iceland) KR	3–2	0–2
DAG Liepāja (Latvia)	3–0	(Estonia) Lantana Tallinn	3–0 (f)	0–0

=== First leg ===
9 August 1995
19:30

Grevenmacher (Luxembourg)	3–2	(Iceland) KR
Jungblut 7', 53'; Alves Silva 58'	Report	Biberčić 49'; Egilsson 82'

Stade Op Flohr, Grevenmacher
Attendance: 1,025
Referee: José Rubio Valdivieso (Spain)

10 August 1995
19:30

Tiligul Tiraspol (Moldova)	0–0	(Switzerland) Sion
	Report

Stadionul Republican, Chișinău
Attendance: 4,500
Referee: Veselin Bogdanov (Bulgaria)

10 August 1995
20:00

Vác FC Samsung (Hungary)	1–1	(North Macedonia) Sileks
Romanek 90'	Report	T. Micevski 58'

Vác Városi Stadion, Vác
Attendance: 5,400
Referee: Zygmunt Ziober (Poland)

10 August 1995
19:00

TPS (Finland)	1–0	(Albania) Teuta Durrës
Walldén 31'	Report

Kupittaan jalkapallostadion, Turku
Attendance: 1,320
Referee: Nikolai Levnikov (Russia)

10 August 1995
18:00

Vaduz (Liechtenstein)	0–5	(Czech Republic) Hradec Králové
	Report	Černý 15'; Samec 32', 50', 59'; Ptáček 37'

Sportpark Eschen-Mauren, Eschen
Attendance: 1,170
Referee: Mateo Beusan (Croatia)

10 August 1995
20:30

APOEL (Cyprus)	3–0	(Azerbaijan) Neftçi
Antoniou 18'; Ioannou 44', 66'	Report

Makario Stadium, Nicosia
Attendance: 12,600
Referee: Ceri Richards (Wales)

10 August 1995
19:30

Wrexham (Wales)	0–0	(Romania) Petrolul Ploiești
	Report

Racecourse Ground, Wrexham
Attendance: 4,308
Referee: Finn Lambek (Denmark)

10 August 1995
20:00

Valletta (Malta)	0–0	(Slovakia) Inter Bratislava
	Report

National Stadium, Ta' Qali
Attendance: 1,084
Referee: Branimir Babarogić (FR Yugoslavia)

10 August 1995
19:00

Shakhtar Donetsk (Ukraine)	4–1	(Northern Ireland) Linfield
Atelkin 10'; McLean 19' (o.g.); Orbu 28', 90'	Report	Ewing 47'

Shakhtar Stadium, Donetsk
Attendance: 27,600
Referee: Ľuboš Micheľ (Slovakia)

10 August 1995
19:00

Žalgiris Vilnius (Lithuania)	2–0	(Slovenia) Mura
Baltušnikas 53'; Tereškinas 67'	Report

Žalgiris Stadium, Vilnius
Attendance: 2,000
Referee: Sergo Kvaratskhelia (Georgia)

10 August 1995
17:00

GKS Katowice (Poland)	2–0	(Armenia) Ararat Yerevan
Bilski 26'; Karwan 29'	Report

GKS Katowice Stadium, Chorzów
Attendance: 1,227
Referee: Rune Pedersen (Norway)

10 August 1995
20:00

Obilić (Federal Republic of Yugoslavia)	0–1	(Georgia (country)) Dinamo Batumi
	Report	Machutadze 70'

Stadion FK Obilić, Belgrade
Attendance: 418
Referee: Roland Beck (Liechtenstein)

10 August 1995
19:30

Derry City (Republic of Ireland)	1–0	(Bulgaria) Lokomotiv Sofia
McCourt 43'	Report

Brandywell Stadium, Derry
Attendance: 4,860
Referee: Marnix Sandra (Belgium)

10 August 1995
18:00

Maccabi Haifa (Israel)	4–0	(Faroe Islands) KÍ
Mizrahi 9', 36', 84'; Shitrit 68'	Report

Kiryat Eliezer Stadium, Haifa
Attendance: 2,690
Referee: Vencel Tóth (Hungary)

10 August 1995
19:00

Dinamo-93 Minsk (Belarus)	1–1	(Norway) Molde
Labanaw 36'	Report	Solskjær 85'

Dinamo Stadium, Minsk
Attendance: 5,700
Referee: Claude Détruche (Switzerland)

10 August 1995
18:00

DAG Liepāja (Latvia)	3–0	(Estonia) Lantana Tallinn
Dobrecovs 5'	Report	Lapsa 33'; Movko 67' (o.g.)

Daugava Stadium, Riga
Attendance: 1,300
Referee: Tomasz Mikulski (Poland)

DAG Liepāja awarded victory 3–0, due to Lantana Tallinn fielding an ineligible player, Andrei Borissov. The score at the moment was 1–2.

=== Second leg ===
22 August 1995
20:00

KR (Iceland)	2–0	(Luxembourg) Grevenmacher
Biberčić 44'; Porca 68'	Report

Laugardalsvöllur, Reykjavík
Attendance: 932
Referee: John Ferry (Northern Ireland)

KR won 4–3 on aggregate.

23 August 1995
20:15

Sion (Switzerland)	3–2	(Moldova) Tiligul Tiraspol
Moser 23'; Herr 29'; Bonvin 45'	Report	Oprea 79'; Popovici 90'

Stade de Tourbillon, Sion
Attendance: 12,000
Referee: Theodoros Kefalas (Greece)

Sion won 3–2 on aggregate.

24 August 1995
17:00

Sileks (North Macedonia)	3–1	(Hungary) Vác FC Samsung
Memedi 15', 67'; Borov 36'	Report	Borgulya 21'

Gradski Stadion, Kratovo
Attendance: 3,000
Referee: Karl Finzinger (Austria)

Sileks won 4–2 on aggregate.

24 August 1995
16:30

Teuta Durrës (Albania)	3–0	(Finland) TPS
Vila 9'; Koça 19'; Bushi 55'	Report

Qemal Stafa Stadium, Tirana
Attendance: 2,800
Referee: Štefan Tivold (Slovenia)

Teuta Durrës won 3–1 on aggregate.

24 August 1995
16:30

Hradec Králové (Czech Republic)	9–1	(Liechtenstein) Vaduz
Samec 4', 10', 30', 54'; Urban 15', 77' (pen.); Vrábel 37'; Šmarda 50' (pen.); Ptáček 64'	Report	Ritter 28'

Všesportovní stadion, Hradec Králové
Attendance: 3,558
Referee: Volodymyr Pianykh (Ukraine)

Hradec Králové won 14–1 on aggregate.

24 August 1995
17:00

Neftçi (Azerbaijan)	0–0	(Cyprus) APOEL
	Report

Tofiq Bahramov Republican Stadium, Baku
Attendance: 3,600
Referee: Dan Dragoș Crăciun (Romania)

APOEL won 3–0 on aggregate.

24 August 1995
17:00

Petrolul Ploiești (Romania)	1–0	(Wales) Wrexham
Pârlog 60'	Report

Stadionul Ilie Oană, Ploiești
Attendance: 7,215
Referee: Oğuz Sarvan (Turkey)

Petrolul Ploiești won 1–0 on aggregate.

24 August 1995
19:00

Inter Bratislava (Slovakia)	5–2	(Malta) Valletta
Rupec 10'; Tomko 14', 57'; Greguška 78'; Landerl 85'	Report	Dončić 60'; Zarb 83'

Štadión Pasienky, Bratislava
Attendance: 2,374
Referee: Valeriy Onufer (Ukraine)

Inter Bratislava won 5–2 on aggregate.

24 August 1995
19:30

Linfield (Northern Ireland)	0–1	(Ukraine) Shakhtar Donetsk
	Report	Voskoboynyk 85'

Windsor Park, Belfast
Attendance: 9,862
Referee: Juha Hirviniemi (Finland)

Shakhtar Donetsk won 5–1 on aggregate.

24 August 1995
16:00

Mura (Slovenia)	2–1	(Lithuania) Žalgiris Vilnius
Kokol 11'; Alihodžić 89'	Report	Vencevičius 72'

Mestni stadion Fazanerija, Murska Sobota
Attendance: 2,950
Referee: Georgios Bikas (Greece)

Žalgiris Vilnius won 3–2 on aggregate.

24 August 1995
19:00

Ararat Yerevan (Armenia)	2–0 (a.e.t.)	(Poland) GKS Katowice
Gspeyan 23'; Tonoyan 26'	Report
Penalties
Gspeyan (penalty scored); Shahgeldyan (penalty scored); Harutyunyan (penalty scored); Nigoyan (penalty scored); Tonoyan (penalty scored)	5–4	(penalty scored) Węgrzyn; (penalty scored) Pawłuszek; (penalty scored) Świerczewski; (penalty scored) Ledwoń; (penalty missed) Jojko

Hrazdan Stadium, Yerevan
Attendance: 3,000
Referee: Hienadz Yakubowski (Belarus)

2–2 on aggregate. Ararat Yerevan won 5–4 on penalties.

24 August 1995
18:00

Dinamo Batumi (Georgia (country))	2–2	(Federal Republic of Yugoslavia) Obilić
Machutadze 59'; Mujiri 80'	Report	Šarac 8'; Popović 33'

Central Stadium, Batumi
Attendance: 3,000
Referee: Leif Sundell (Sweden)

Dinamo Batumi won 3–2 on aggregate.

24 August 1995
20:00

Lokomotiv Sofia (Bulgaria)	2–0	(Republic of Ireland) Derry City
Slavchev 5'; Hvoynev 29'	Report

Stadion Lokomotiv, Sofia
Attendance: 3,994
Referee: Tasos Papaioannou (Cyprus)

Lokomotiv Sofia won 2–1 on aggregate.

24 August 1995
18:00

KÍ (Faroe Islands)	3–2	(Israel) Maccabi Haifa
Danielsen 54', 61', 71'	Report	Revivo 32'; Shitrit 83'

Svangaskarð, Toftir
Attendance: 295
Referee: Richard O'Hanlon (Republic of Ireland)

Maccabi Haifa won 6–3 on aggregate.

24 August 1995
18:00

Molde (Norway)	2–1	(Belarus) Dinamo-93 Minsk
Solskjær 4'; A. Stavrum 68'	Report	Skrypchanka 20'

Molde stadion, Molde
Attendance: 2,989
Referee: Jürgen Aust (Germany)

Molde won 3–2 on aggregate.

24 August 1995
18:00

Lantana Tallinn (Estonia)	0–0	(Latvia) DAG Liepāja
	Report

Kadriorg Stadium, Tallinn
Attendance: 340
Referee: Bohdan Benedik (Slovakia)

DAG Liepāja won 3–0 on aggregate.

== First round ==
Team 1	Agg.	Team 2	1st leg	2nd leg
Žalgiris Vilnius (Lithuania)	2–3	(Turkey) Trabzonspor	2–2	0–1
APOEL (Cyprus)	0–8	(Spain) Deportivo La Coruña	0–0	0–8
Inter Bratislava (Slovakia)	1–5	(Spain) Zaragoza	0–2	1–3
Club Brugge (Belgium)	2–1	(Ukraine) Shakhtar Donetsk	1–0	1–1
Lokomotiv Sofia (Bulgaria)	3–3 (a)	(Sweden) Halmstad	3–1	0–2
Teuta Durrës (Albania)	0–4	(Italy) Parma	0–2	0–2
Molde (Norway)	2–6	(France) Paris Saint-Germain	2–3	0–3
Dinamo Batumi (Georgia (country))	2–7	(Scotland) Celtic	2–3	0–4
Borussia Mönchengladbach (Germany)	6–2	(North Macedonia) Sileks	3–0	3–2
AEK Athens (Greece)	4–2	(Switzerland) Sion	2–0	2–2
KR (Iceland)	3–6	(England) Everton	2–3	1–3
DAG Liepāja (Latvia)	0–13	(Netherlands) Feyenoord	0–7	0–6
Dynamo Moscow (Russia)	4–1	(Armenia) Ararat Yerevan	3–1	1–0
Hradec Králové (Czech Republic)	7–2	(Denmark) Copenhagen	5–0	2–2
Sporting CP (Portugal)	4–0	(Israel) Maccabi Haifa	4–0	0–0
Rapid Wien (Austria)	3–1	(Romania) Petrolul Ploiești	3–1	0–0

=== First leg ===
14 September 1995
20:00

Žalgiris Vilnius (Lithuania)	2–2	(Turkey) Trabzonspor
Tereškinas 7'; Mikulėnas 67'	Report	S. Arveladze 25'; Ercan 54'

Lokomotyvas Stadium, Vilnius
Attendance: 1,800
Referee: Finn Lambek (Denmark)

14 September 1995
20:15

APOEL (Cyprus)	0–0	(Spain) Deportivo La Coruña
	Report

Makario Stadium, Nicosia
Attendance: 10,200
Referee: Marcello Nicchi (Italy)

14 September 1995
19:15

Inter Bratislava (Slovakia)	0–2	(Spain) Zaragoza
	Report	Morientes 42'; Óscar 60'

Štadión Pasienky, Bratislava
Attendance: 2,750
Referee: Periklis Vasilakis (Greece)

14 September 1995
20:00

Club Brugge (Belgium)	1–0	(Ukraine) Shakhtar Donetsk
Špehar 88'	Report

Olympiastadion, Bruges
Attendance: 7,520
Referee: Vítor Melo Pereira (Portugal)

14 September 1995
19:00

Lokomotiv Sofia (Bulgaria)	3–1	(Sweden) Halmstad
Marinov 41'; Petkov 43' (pen.); Donev 57'	Report	M. Svensson 33'

Stadion Lokomotiv, Sofia
Attendance: 2,008
Referee: Kurt Zuppinger (Switzerland)

14 September 1995
16:30

Teuta Durrës (Albania)	0–2	(Italy) Parma
	Report	Zola 82', 85'

Qemal Stafa Stadium, Tirana
Attendance: 8,100
Referee: Dimitar Momirov (Bulgaria)

14 September 1995
20:30

Molde (Norway)	2–3	(France) Paris Saint-Germain
Solskjær 56'; A. Stavrum 81'	Report	Le Guen 76'; Djorkaeff 78' (pen.); Dely Valdés 84'

Ullevaal Stadion, Oslo
Attendance: 3,379
Referee: John Rowbotham (Scotland)

14 September 1995
18:00

Dinamo Batumi (Georgia (country))	2–3	(Scotland) Celtic
Machutadze 11'; Tugushi 68'	Report	Thom 21', 87'; Donnelly 39'

Central Stadium, Batumi
Attendance: 15,200
Referee: Amit Klein (Israel)

14 September 1995
20:30

Borussia Mönchengladbach (Germany)	3–0	(North Macedonia) Sileks
Pflipsen 6'; Effenberg 19'; Klinkert 87'	Report

Bökelbergstadion, Mönchengladbach
Attendance: 13,750
Referee: Sándor Varga (Hungary)

14 September 1995
21:00

AEK Athens (Greece)	2–0	(Switzerland) Sion
Vlachos 45'; Borbokis 70'	Report

Nikos Goumas Stadium, Athens
Attendance: 20,740
Referee: Frans Van Den Wijngaert (Belgium)

14 September 1995
20:00

KR (Iceland)	2–3	(England) Everton
Biberčić 36' (pen.), 68' (pen.)	Report	Ebbrell 22'; Unsworth 56' (pen.); Amokachi 88'

KR-völlur, Reykjavík
Attendance: 5,956
Referee: Roger Philippi (Luxembourg)

14 September 1995
20:00

DAG Liepāja (Latvia)	0–7	(Netherlands) Feyenoord
	Report	Larsson 2'; Blinker 47', 58', 62'; Trustfull 61'; Koeman 78'; Obiku 88'

Daugava Stadium, Liepāja
Attendance: 3,150
Referee: Sven Kjelbrott (Norway)

14 September 1995
18:00

Dynamo Moscow (Russia)	3–1	(Armenia) Ararat Yerevan
Teryokhin 45', 89'; Safronov 73'	Report	Stepanyan 71'

Central Dynamo Stadium, Moscow
Attendance: 7,100
Referee: Robert Sedlacek (Austria)

14 September 1995
16:30

Hradec Králové (Czech Republic)	5–0	(Denmark) Copenhagen
Samec 32', 76'; Hynek 39'; Černý 52'; Ptáček 90'	Report

Všesportovní stadion, Hradec Králové
Attendance: 4,532
Referee: Ilkka Koho (Finland)

14 September 1995
21:30

Sporting CP (Portugal)	4–0	(Israel) Maccabi Haifa
Barbosa 7', 10', 47'; Sá Pinto 88'	Report

Estádio José Alvalade, Lisbon
Attendance: 31,800
Referee: Keith Burge (Wales)

14 September 1995
20:20

Rapid Wien (Austria)	3–1	(Romania) Petrolul Ploiești
Barisic 44', 89'; Ivanov 59'	Report	Toader 65'

Gerhard-Hanappi-Stadion, Vienna
Attendance: 9,979
Referee: Loizos Loizou (Cyprus)

=== Second leg ===
28 September 1995
19:00

Trabzonspor (Turkey)	1–0	(Lithuania) Žalgiris Vilnius
Mandıralı 38'	Report

Hüseyin Avni Aker Stadium, Trabzon
Attendance: 22,600
Referee: Syarhey Shmolik (Belarus)

Trabzonspor won 3–2 on aggregate.

28 September 1995
20:00

Deportivo La Coruña (Spain)	8–0	(Cyprus) APOEL
Bebeto 16', 21', 44'; Radchenko 28', 66'; Begiristain 42'; Donato 60'; Aldana 78'	Report

Estadio Riazor, A Coruña
Attendance: 10,650
Referee: Alfred Micallef (Malta)

Deportivo La Coruña won 8–0 on aggregate.

28 September 1995
22:00

Zaragoza (Spain)	3–1	(Slovakia) Inter Bratislava
Poyet 12'; Higuera 64'; Dani 72'	Report	Obšitník 77' (pen.)

La Romareda, Zaragoza
Attendance: 12,600
Referee: Gilles Veissière (France)

Zaragoza won 5–1 on aggregate.

28 September 1995
19:00

Shakhtar Donetsk (Ukraine)	1–1	(Belgium) Club Brugge
Voskoboynyk 61'	Report	Stanić 60'

Shakhtar Stadium, Donetsk
Attendance: 37,600
Referee: Gheorghe Constantin (Romania)

Club Brugge won 2–1 on aggregate.

28 September 1995
19:00

Halmstad (Sweden)	2–0	(Bulgaria) Lokomotiv Sofia
R. Andersson 23'; T. Andersson 75'	Report

Örjans Vall, Halmstad
Attendance: 3,145
Referee: Vasyl Melnychuk (Ukraine)

3–3 on aggregate. Halmstad won on away goals.

28 September 1995
20:45

Parma (Italy)	2–0	(Albania) Teuta Durrës
Melli 8'; Inzaghi 90'	Report

Stadio Ennio Tardini, Parma
Attendance: 10,291
Referee: Milan Mitrovič (Slovenia)

Parma won 4–0 on aggregate.

28 September 1995
20:30

Paris Saint-Germain (France)	3–0	(Norway) Molde
Nouma 7', 13'; Djorkaeff 77'	Report

Parc des Princes, Paris
Attendance: 18,898
Referee: Sándor Piller (Hungary)

Paris Saint-Germain won 6–2 on aggregate.

28 September 1995
19:45

Celtic (Scotland)	4–0	(Georgia (country)) Dinamo Batumi
Thom 18', 20'; Donnelly 46'; Walker 90'	Report

Celtic Park, Glasgow
Attendance: 31,969
Referee: Gylfi Orrason (Iceland)

Celtic won 7–2 on aggregate.

28 September 1995
20:20

Sileks (North Macedonia)	2–3	(Germany) Borussia Mönchengladbach
Memedi 52'; Boškovski 59'	Report	Effenberg 29'; Dahlin 53'; Nielsen 80'

Gradski Stadion, Kratovo
Attendance: 9,000
Referee: Fernand Meese (Belgium)

Borussia Mönchengladbach won 6–2 on aggregate.

28 September 1995
20:30

Sion (Switzerland)	2–2	(Greece) AEK Athens
Bonvin 20'; Giallanza 85'	Report	Ketsbaia 82'; Batista 87'

Stade de Tourbillon, Sion
Attendance: 6,900
Referee: Loris Stafoggia (Italy)

AEK Athens won 4–2 on aggregate.

28 September 1995
19:45

Everton (England)	3–1	(Iceland) KR
Stuart 56'; Grant 65'; Rideout 87'	Report	Daníelsson 22'

Goodison Park, Liverpool
Attendance: 18,422
Referee: Ladislav Gádoši (Slovakia)

Everton won 6–3 on aggregate.

28 September 1995
20:00

Feyenoord (Netherlands)	6–0	(Latvia) DAG Liepāja
Heus 37' (pen.); Trustfull 43'; Obiku 57', 63', 65'; Gláucio 61'	Report

De Kuip, Rotterdam
Attendance: 10,746
Referee: Brendan Shorte (Republic of Ireland)

Feyenoord won 13–0 on aggregate.

28 September 1995
19:00

Ararat Yerevan (Armenia)	0–1	(Russia) Dynamo Moscow
	Report	Teryokhin 66'

Hrazdan Stadium, Yerevan
Attendance: 2,272
Referee: Jan Wegereef (Netherlands)

Dynamo Moscow won 4–1 on aggregate.

28 September 1995
20:00

Copenhagen (Denmark)	2–2	(Czech Republic) Hradec Králové
Tengstedt 28'; Tur 72'	Report	Urbánek 10'; Rehák 12'

Parken Stadium, Copenhagen
Attendance: 4,432
Referee: John Ferry (Northern Ireland)

Hradec Králové won 7–2 on aggregate.

28 September 1995
18:30

Maccabi Haifa (Israel)	0–0	(Portugal) Sporting CP
	Report

Kiryat Eliezer Stadium, Haifa
Attendance: 4,330
Referee: Taras Bezubyak (Russia)

Sporting CP won 4–0 on aggregate.

28 September 1995
15:30

Petrolul Ploiești (Romania)	0–0	(Austria) Rapid Wien
	Report

Stadionul Ilie Oană, Ploiești
Attendance: 6,500
Referee: Manuel Díaz Vega (Spain)

Rapid Wien won 3–1 on aggregate.

== Second round ==
Team 1	Agg.	Team 2	1st leg	2nd leg
Trabzonspor (Turkey)	0–4	(Spain) Deportivo La Coruña	0–1	0–3
Zaragoza (Spain)	3–1	(Belgium) Club Brugge	2–1	1–0
Halmstad (Sweden)	3–4	(Italy) Parma	3–0	0–4
Paris Saint-Germain (France)	4–0	(Scotland) Celtic	1–0	3–0
Borussia Mönchengladbach (Germany)	5–1	(Greece) AEK Athens	4–1	1–0
Everton (England)	0–1	(Netherlands) Feyenoord	0–0	0–1
Dynamo Moscow (Russia)	1–1 (3–1 p)	(Czech Republic) Hradec Králové	1–0	0–1
Sporting CP (Portugal)	2–4	(Austria) Rapid Wien	2–0	0–4 (aet)

=== First leg ===
19 October 1995
20:00

Trabzonspor (Turkey)	0–1	(Spain) Deportivo La Coruña
	Report	Donato 60'

Hüseyin Avni Aker Stadium, Trabzon
Attendance: 9,101
Referee: Frans Van Den Wijngaert (Belgium)

19 October 1995
21:15

Zaragoza (Spain)	2–1	(Belgium) Club Brugge
Aragón 28' (pen.); Dani 33'	Report	Staelens 73' (pen.)

La Romareda, Zaragoza
Attendance: 24,850
Referee: Stephen Lodge (England)

19 October 1995
20:05

Halmstad (Sweden)	3–0	(Italy) Parma
Gudmundsson 7', 31'; R. Andersson 76'	Report

Gamla Ullevi, Gothenburg
Attendance: 9,326
Referee: Bernd Heynemann (Germany)

19 October 1995
20:30

Paris Saint-Germain (France)	1–0	(Scotland) Celtic
Djorkaeff 76'	Report

Parc des Princes, Paris
Attendance: 30,010
Referee: Günter Benkö (Austria)

19 October 1995
20:30

Borussia Mönchengladbach (Germany)	4–1	(Greece) AEK Athens
Dahlin 51', 90'; Pflipsen 55'; Wynhoff 68'	Report	Maladenis 78'

Bökelbergstadion, Mönchengladbach
Attendance: 21,200
Referee: Jorge Coroado (Portugal)

19 October 1995
19:45

Everton (England)	0–0	(Netherlands) Feyenoord
	Report

Goodison Park, Liverpool
Attendance: 27,526
Referee: Hans-Jürgen Weber (Germany)

19 October 1995
18:00

Dynamo Moscow (Russia)	1–0	(Czech Republic) Hradec Králové
Kuznetsov 57'	Report

Central Dynamo Stadium, Moscow
Attendance: 8,700
Referee: Richard O'Hanlon (Republic of Ireland)

19 October 1995
21:00

Sporting CP (Portugal)	2–0	(Austria) Rapid Wien
Sá Pinto 14'; Paulo Alves 25'	Report

Estádio José Alvalade, Lisbon
Attendance: 40,500
Referee: Alain Hamer (Luxembourg)

=== Second leg ===
2 November 1995
22:00

Deportivo La Coruña (Spain)	3–0	(Turkey) Trabzonspor
Donato 22'; Bebeto 39', 80'	Report

Estadio Riazor, A Coruña
Attendance: 27,500
Referee: Gheorghe Constantin (Romania)

Deportivo La Coruña won 4–0 on aggregate.

2 November 1995
20:00

Club Brugge (Belgium)	0–1	(Spain) Zaragoza
	Report	Dani 90'

Olympiastadion, Bruges
Attendance: 16,613
Referee: Dimitar Momirov (Bulgaria)

Zaragoza won 3–1 on aggregate.

2 November 1995
20:30

Parma (Italy)	4–0	(Sweden) Halmstad
Inzaghi 1'; Baggio 38'; Stoichkov 53'; Benarrivo 69'	Report

Stadio Ennio Tardini, Parma
Attendance: 13,053
Referee: Finn Lambek (Denmark)

Parma won 4–3 on aggregate.

2 November 1995
19:45

Celtic (Scotland)	0–3	(France) Paris Saint-Germain
	Report	Loko 36', 42'; Nouma 68'

Celtic Park, Glasgow
Attendance: 34,822
Referee: Kurt Röthlisberger (Switzerland)

Paris Saint-Germain won 4–0 on aggregate.

2 November 1995
21:20

AEK Athens (Greece)	0–1	(Germany) Borussia Mönchengladbach
	Report	Effenberg 71'

Nikos Goumas Stadium, Athens
Attendance: 14,380
Referee: Leslie Mottram (Scotland)

Borussia Mönchengladbach won 5–1 on aggregate.

2 November 1995
20:00

Feyenoord (Netherlands)	1–0	(England) Everton
Blinker 40'	Report

De Kuip, Rotterdam
Attendance: 40,289
Referee: Marcello Nicchi (Italy)

Feyenoord won 1–0 on aggregate.

2 November 1995
17:15

Hradec Králové (Czech Republic)	1–0 (a.e.t.)	(Russia) Dynamo Moscow
Kaplan 14'	Report
Penalties
Drozd (penalty missed); Černý (penalty missed); Džubara (penalty missed); Holub (penalty scored)	1–3	(penalty scored) Kobelev; (penalty missed) Teryokhin; (penalty scored) Samatov; (penalty scored) Kovtun

Stadion Letná, Prague
Attendance: 11,530
Referee: Roy Helge Olsen (Norway)

1–1 on aggregate. Dynamo Moscow won 3–1 on penalties.

2 November 1995
20:20

Rapid Wien (Austria)	4–0 (a.e.t.)	(Portugal) Sporting CP
Kühbauer 25'; Stumpf 90', 105'; Jancker 110'	Report

Ernst-Happel-Stadion, Vienna
Attendance: 22,500
Referee: Werner Müller (Switzerland)

Rapid Wien won 4–2 on aggregate.

== Quarter-finals ==
Team 1	Agg.	Team 2	1st leg	2nd leg
Deportivo La Coruña (Spain)	2–1	(Spain) Zaragoza	1–0	1–1
Parma (Italy)	2–3	(France) Paris Saint-Germain	1–0	1–3
Borussia Mönchengladbach (Germany)	2–3	(Netherlands) Feyenoord	2–2	0–1
Dynamo Moscow (Russia)	0–4	(Austria) Rapid Wien	0–1	0–3

=== First leg ===
7 March 1996
21:30

Deportivo La Coruña (Spain)	1–0	(Spain) Zaragoza
Fernández 69'	Report

Estadio Riazor, A Coruña
Attendance: 13,800
Referee: Gerd Grabher (Austria)

7 March 1996
20:45

Parma (Italy)	1–0	(France) Paris Saint-Germain
Stoichkov 58'	Report

Stadio Ennio Tardini, Parma
Attendance: 12,447
Referee: Sándor Puhl (Hungary)

7 March 1996
20:30

Borussia Mönchengladbach (Germany)	2–2	(Netherlands) Feyenoord
Wynhoff 4'; Kastenmaier 42' (pen.)	Report	Van Gastel 35'; Koeman 45' (pen.)

Rheinstadion, Düsseldorf
Attendance: 51,000
Referee: László Vágner (Hungary)

7 March 1996
19:30

Dynamo Moscow (Russia)	0–1	(Austria) Rapid Wien
	Report	Stumpf 33'

Central Dynamo Stadium, Moscow
Attendance: 5,900
Referee: Bernd Heynemann (Germany)

=== Second leg ===
21 March 1996
21:30

Zaragoza (Spain)	1–1	(Spain) Deportivo La Coruña
Morientes 37'	Report	Bebeto 63'

La Romareda, Zaragoza
Attendance: 31,900
Referee: Guy Goethals (Belgium)

Deportivo La Coruña won 2–1 on aggregate.

21 March 1996
20:30

Paris Saint-Germain (France)	3–1	(Italy) Parma
Raí 9' (pen.), 69' (pen.); Loko 38'	Report	Melli 26'

Parc des Princes, Paris
Attendance: 43,686
Referee: Leif Sundell (Sweden)

Paris Saint-Germain won 3–2 on aggregate.

21 March 1996
20:30

Feyenoord (Netherlands)	1–0	(Germany) Borussia Mönchengladbach
Trustfull 84'	Report

De Kuip, Rotterdam
Attendance: 43,080
Referee: Kim Milton Nielsen (Denmark)

Feyenoord won 3–2 on aggregate.

21 March 1996
20:30

Rapid Wien (Austria)	3–0	(Russia) Dynamo Moscow
Jancker 49', 74'; Stöger 61' (pen.)	Report

Ernst-Happel-Stadion, Vienna
Attendance: 42,700
Referee: Marc Batta (France)

Rapid Wien won 4–0 on aggregate.

== Semi-finals ==
Team 1	Agg.	Team 2	1st leg	2nd leg
Deportivo La Coruña (Spain)	0–2	(France) Paris Saint-Germain	0–1	0–1
Feyenoord (Netherlands)	1–4	(Austria) Rapid Wien	1–1	0–3

=== First leg ===
4 April 1996
21:00

Deportivo La Coruña (Spain)	0–1	(France) Paris Saint-Germain
	Report	Djorkaeff 90'

Estadio Riazor, A Coruña
Attendance: 21,100
Referee: Markus Merk (Germany)

4 April 1996
20:30

Feyenoord (Netherlands)	1–1	(Austria) Rapid Wien
Koeman 53' (pen.)	Report	Jancker 66'

De Kuip, Rotterdam
Attendance: 41,241
Referee: Ryszard Wójcik (Poland)

=== Second leg ===
18 April 1996
21:00

Paris Saint-Germain (France)	1–0	(Spain) Deportivo La Coruña
Loko 59'	Report

Parc des Princes, Paris
Attendance: 41,508
Referee: Alfredo Trentalange (Italy)

Paris Saint-Germain won 2–0 on aggregate.

18 April 1996
20:30

Rapid Wien (Austria)	3–0	(Netherlands) Feyenoord
Jancker 2', 35'; Stumpf 32'	Report

Ernst-Happel-Stadion, Vienna
Attendance: 46,000
Referee: Sergei Khusainov (Russia)

Rapid Wien won 4–1 on aggregate.

== Final ==
8 May 1996
20:15

Paris Saint-Germain (France)	1–0	(Austria) Rapid Wien
Ngotty 28'	Report

King Baudouin Stadium, Brussels
Attendance: 38,402
Referee: Pierluigi Pairetto (Italy)

== Top goalscorers ==
The top goalscorers from the 1995–96 UEFA Cup Winners' Cup are as follows:

Rank	Name	Team	Goals
1	(Czech Republic) Petr Samec	(Czech Republic) Hradec Králové	9
2	(Brazil) Bebeto	(Spain) Deportivo La Coruña	6
2	(Germany) Carsten Jancker	(Austria) Rapid Wien	6
4	(Federal Republic of Yugoslavia) Mihajlo Biberčić	(Iceland) KR Reykjavík	4
4	(Netherlands) Regi Blinker	(Netherlands) Feyenoord	4
4	(France) Youri Djorkaeff	(France) Paris Saint-Germain	4
4	(France) Patrice Loko	(France) Paris Saint-Germain	4
4	(Nigeria) Michael Obiku	(Netherlands) Feyenoord	4
4	(Austria) Christian Stumpf	(Austria) Rapid Wien	4
4	(Germany) Andreas Thom	(Scotland) Celtic	4

== See also ==
- 1995–96 UEFA Champions League
- 1995–96 UEFA Cup
- 1995 UEFA Intertoto Cup
