= British Academy Television Award for Best Features =

Annual UK television award

British Academy Television Award
- Country: United Kingdom
- Presented by: British Academy of Film and Television Arts
- First award: 1999
- Currently held by: Go Back to Where You Came From (2026)
- Website: http://www.bafta.org/

The British Academy Television Award for Best Features is one of the major categories of the British Academy Television Awards (BAFTAs), the primary awards ceremony of the British television industry. According to the BAFTA website, the category "includes factual programmes, not included in any other categories including cookery and cookery competitions, travelogues, gardening, property, fashion and all other lifestyle programming and studio discussions."

The category was first presented in 1999 under the name of Best Feature - Programme or Series although since 2000 the category has been presented just as Best Features.

== Winners and nominees ==
=== 1990s ===
Best Feature - Programme or Series

Year	Title	Recipient(s)	Broadcaster
1999	Back to the Floor	Bill Grist, Robert Thirkell	BBC Two
1999	House Doctor	Daisy Goodwin, Basi Akpabio	Channel 5
1999	Changing Rooms	Linda Clifford, Casper Peacock, Ann Booth Clibborn	BBC Two
1999	Time Team	Phillip Clarke, Tim Taylor	Channel 4

=== 2000s ===
Best Features

Year	Title	Recipient(s)	Broadcaster
2000	Blood on the Carpet	Robert Thirkell, Nick Mirsky	BBC Two
2000	Giants with Nigel Marven	Rob MacIver, Nigel Marven, Bill Butt	ITV
2000	The Naked Chef	Patricia Llewellyn, Paul Ratcliffe, Jamie Oliver	BBC Two
2000	Grand Designs	Daisy Goodwin, John Silver	Channel 4
2001	The Naked Chef	Patricia Llewellyn, Paul Ratcliffe, Jamie Oliver	BBC Two
2001	Faking It	Mike Warner, Stephen Lambert	Channel 4
2001	House of Horrors	Sarah Caplin, Kate Middleton, Brad Manning	ITV
2001	What the Romans Did for Us		BBC Two
2002	Faking It		Channel 4
2002	The Farmer Wants a Wife	Amanda Murray	ITV
2002	The Sound of Music Children: After They Were Famous	Judith Holder, Bridget Boseley, Southan Morris	ITV
2002	What Not to Wear	Vicki Barrass, Tracy Jeune, Nick Bray	BBC Two
2003	Faking It	Stephen Lambert	Channel 4
2003	Lads' Army	Claudia Milne, Peter Casely-Hayford, Tim Carter	ITV
2003	Jamie's Kitchen	Sandi Scott, Peter Moore	Channel 4
2003	What Not to Wear	Jane GerberVicki Barrass, Tracy Jeune	BBC Two
2004	Wife Swap		Channel 4
2004	Grand Designs	John Silver, Daisy Goodwin, Kevin McCloud	Channel 4
2004	That'll Teach 'Em		Channel 4
2004	Top Gear	Andy Wilman, Gary Hunter, Jeremy Clarkson	BBC Two
2005	Ramsay's Kitchen Nightmares	Patricia Llewellyn, Christine Hall, Gordon Ramsay	Channel 4
2005	Holiday Showdown	Grant Mansfield, Nick Shearman, Dan Berbridge	ITV
2005	Little Angels		BBC Three
2005	Top Gear	Andy Wilman, Jeremy Clarkson, Gary Broadhurst	BBC Two
2006	The Apprentice	Dan Adamson, Tanya Shaw, Peter Moore	BBC Two
2006	Dragons' Den		BBC Two
2006	Top Gear		BBC Two
2006	Ramsay's Kitchen Nightmares		Channel 4
2007	The Choir	Jamie Isaacs, Ludo Graham, Drew Hill, Sam Grace	BBC Two
2007	The F Word		Channel 4
2007	The Apprentice	Dan Adamson, Sanjay Singhal, Martyn Smith, Alan Sugar	BBC Two
2007	Dragons' Den	Helen Bullough, Dominic Bird, Paul Mackay	BBC Two
2008	Ramsay's Kitchen Nightmares		Channel 4
2008	Heston Blumenthal: In Search of Perfection		BBC Two
2008	Top Gear		
2008	The Secret Millionaire		Channel 4
2009	The Choir: Boys Don't Sing		BBC Two
2009	The Apprentice	Alan Sugar, Michele Kurland, Kelly Webb-Lamb, Andy Devonshire	BBC One
2009	Celebrity Masterchef	Karen Ross, Mark Leslie, Bec Smith, Theo Goble	BBC One
2009	Top Gear	Andy Wilman, Jeremy Clarkson, Richard Hammond, James May	BBC Two

=== 2010s ===
Year	Title	Recipient(s)	Broadcaster
2010	Masterchef: The Professionals	Karen Ross, Carla-Maria Lawson, Antonia Lloyd, David Ambler	BBC Two
2010	Heston's Feasts		Channel 4
2010	The Choir: Unsung Town		BBC Two
2010	James May's Toy Stories	Will Daws, Stuart Cabb, James May, Ian Holt	BBC Two
2011	Hugh's Fish Fight	Andrew Palmer, Will Anderson, Hugh Fearnley-Whittingstall, Frankie Fathers	Channel 4
2011	Mary Queen of Shops		BBC Two
2011	Come Dine with Me		Channel 4
2011	Pineapple Dance Studios	Jonathan Stadien, Pat Doyle, Hannah Springham	Sky1
2012	The Great British Bake Off	Anna Beattie, Andy Devonshire, Simon Evans, Richard McKerrow	BBC Two
2012	DIY SOS: The Big Build	Susan Aartse-Tuyn, Hannah Corneck, Simon Knight, Ben Rowland	BBC One
2012	Hairy Bikers' Meals on Wheels	Tom Clarke, Lisa Edwards, Nicola Moody, Paul Ratcliffe	BBC Two
2012	Timothy Spall: Back at Sea	Paul Crompton, Matt David, Anton Short, Philip Shotton	BBC Four
2013	The Great British Bake Off	Anna Beattie, Kieran Smith, Amanda Westwood, Scott Tankard	BBC Two
2013	Paul O'Grady: For the Love of Dogs	Paul O'Grady, Jill Worsley, Mark Scantlebury, Kate Jackson	ITV
2013	Bank of Dave		Channel 4
2013	Grand Designs		Channel 4
2014	Long Lost Family	Duncan Coates, Kate Scholefield, Sally Benton, Leanne Klein	ITV
2014	Grand Designs	Kevin McCloud, Fiona Caldwell, Rob Gill, John Lonsdale	Channel 4
2014	The Great British Bake Off	Anna Beattie, Amanda Westwood, Samantha Beddoes, Simon Evans	BBC Two
2014	The Choir: Sing While You Work	Gareth Malone, Tim Carter, Rachel Morgan, Stuart Froude	BBC Two
2015	Grand Designs		Channel 4
2015	The Great British Bake Off	Anna Beattie, Samantha Beddoes, Andy Devonshire, Simon Evans	BBC One
2015	George Clarke's Amazing Spaces	Will Daws, Jamie Wightman, Stuart Cabb	Channel 4
2015	Long Lost Family	Sally Benton, Clare Bradbury, Colette Flight, Kate Scholefield	ITV
2016	The Great British Bake Off		BBC One
2016	Back in Time for Dinner	Emily Shields, Leanne Klein, Kim Maddever	BBC Two
2016	Kevin McCloud: Escape to the Wild		Channel 4
2016	Travel Man	Adam Humphries, Leo McCrea, Graham Smiles, Chris Richards	Channel 4
2017	Who Do You Think You Are?	Colette Flight, Sarah Feltes, Anna Kirkwood, Helen Nixon	BBC One
2017	The Doctor Who Gave Up Drugs	Dominique Walker, Emeka Onono, Christopher van Tulleken, Jack Rampling	BBC Two
2017	The Great British Bake Off	Richard McKerrow, Sarah Thomson-Woolley, Simon Evans, Chloe Avery	BBC One
2017	Travel Man: 48 Hours In …	Chris Richards, Nicola Silk, Leo McCrea, Richard Ayoade	Channel 4
2018	Cruising with Jane McDonald		Channel 5
2018	Antiques Roadshow	Simon Shaw, Julia Foot, Robert Murphy, Sophie Wogden	BBC One
2018	No More Boys And Girls: Can Our Kids Go Gender Free?	Javid Abdelmoneim, Helen Veale, Jeremy Daldry, Samuel Palmer	BBC Two
2018	The Secret Life of the Zoo		Channel 4
2019	Who Do You Think You Are?	Colette Flight, Sarah Feltes, Anna Kirkwood, David Vincent	BBC One
2019	Gordon, Gino and Fred: Road Trip		ITV
2019	The Great British Bake Off		Channel 4
2019	Mortimer & Whitehouse: Gone Fishing		BBC Two

=== 2020s ===
Year	Title	Recipient(s)	Broadcaster
2020	The Misadventures of Romesh Ranganathan	Emily Hudd, Morgan Roberts, Christopher Cottam, Romesh Ranganathan	BBC Two
2020	Joe Lycett's Got Your Back		Channel 4
2020	Snackmasters		Channel 4
2020	Mortimer & Whitehouse: Gone Fishing	Bob Mortimer, Paul Whitehouse, Lisa Clark, Will Yapp	BBC Two
2021	Long Lost Family: Born without Trace	Sally Benton, Rosie Schellenberg, Alice Goodyear, Paddy Lynas	ITV
2021	Big Zuu's Big Eats		Dave
2021	Mortimer & Whitehouse: Gone Fishing	Bob Mortimer, Paul Whitehouse, Lisa Clark, Rob Gill, Stephanie Fyfe, Doug Bryson	BBC Two
2021	The Repair Shop		BBC One
2022	Big Zuu's Big Eats	Sam Grace, Alex Gilman, Chris Faith, Lucy Blatch, Big Zuu, Rohan Minhas	Dave
2022	Mortimer & Whitehouse: Gone Fishing	Paul Whitehouse, Bob Mortimer, Lisa Clark, Stephanie Fyfe, Rob Gill	BBC Two
2022	Sort Your Life Out	Charlotte Brookes, Kurt Seywald, James Callum, Lucy Blatch, Michael Hyland, Demi Doyle	BBC One
2022	The Great British Sewing Bee		BBC One
2023	Joe Lycett vs Beckham: Got Your Back at Xmas		Channel 4
2023	Big Zuu's Big Eats	Alex Gilman, Sam Grace, Chris Faith, Zuhair Hassan, Errol Ettienne, Rohan Minhas	Dave
2023	The Martin Lewis Money Show	Martin Lewis, Mike Blair, Clare Miller, Jaime Corby, Richard Jack, Ravinder Dehele	ITV
2023	The Misadventures of Romesh Ranganathan		BBC Two

Best Factual Entertainment

Year	Title	Recipient(s)	Broadcaster
2024	Celebrity Race Across the World		BBC One
2024	The Dog House		Channel 4
2024	Endurance: Race to the Pole	Alexis Girardet, Mike Warner, Adam Bullmore, Martin Long	Channel 5
2024	Portrait Artist of the Year		Sky Arts
2025	Rob and Rylan's Grand Tour	Rob Rinder, Rylan Clark, Lana Salah, Simon Draper, Gwyn Jones, Joseph Fell	BBC Two
2025	Race Across the World		BBC One
2025	Sort Your Life Out		BBC One
2025	In Vogue: The 90s	Liesel Evans, Jonathan Smith, Hugo MacGregor, Vikki Miller, Charlotte Permutt, Matthew Hill	Disney+
2026	Go Back to Where You Came From	Liam Humphreys, Emma Young, Dave Sutton, Guy Simmonds, Nicky Hammond, Mais Al-Bayaa	Channel 4
2026	The Assembly	Michelle Singer, Stu Richards, Holly Ritchie, Céin McGillicuddy, Linton Davies, Mary Lynch	ITV
2026	Knife Edge: Chasing Michelin Stars		Apple TV
2026	Race Across the World		BBC One

- Note: The series that don't have recipients on the tables had Production team credited as recipients for the award or nomination.
