= 1999–2000 UEFA Champions League qualifying rounds =

European football tournament

The qualifying rounds for the 1999–2000 UEFA Champions League began on 13 July 1999. In total, there were three qualifying rounds which provided 16 clubs to join the group stage.

Times are CEST (UTC+2), as listed by UEFA.

== Teams ==
Key to colours
Qualify for the group stage
Eliminated in the Third qualifying round; Advanced to the UEFA Cup first round

Third qualifying round
Team	Coeff.
(Italy) Parma	87.606
(Germany) Borussia Dortmund	84.749
(Russia) Spartak Moscow	62.912
(England) Chelsea	58.144
(Netherlands) PSV Eindhoven	49.908
(France) Lyon	49.721
(Italy) Fiorentina	44.606
(Spain) Valencia	40.814
(Spain) Mallorca	38.814
(Greece) AEK Athens	38.475
(Turkey) Galatasaray	31.175
Croatia Zagreb	25.187
(Germany) Hertha BSC	22.749
(Portugal) Boavista	21.358
(Austria) Sturm Graz	21.187
(Denmark) AaB	14.525
(Switzerland) Servette	12.000
(Czech Republic) Teplice	11.812

Second qualifying round
Team	Coeff.
(Ukraine) Dynamo Kyiv	40.145
(Denmark) Brøndby	38.525
(Austria) Rapid Wien	35.187
(Turkey) Beşiktaş	29.175
(Scotland) Rangers	22.312
(Sweden) AIK	18.662
(Russia) CSKA Moscow	16.912
(Poland) Widzew Łódź	16.625
(Romania) Rapid București	16.100
(Georgia (country)) Dinamo Tbilisi	16.083
(Belgium) Genk	14.800
(Slovakia) Slovan Bratislava	14.166
(Hungary) MTK Hungária	12.833
(Croatia) Rijeka	10.187
(Norway) Molde	9.866
(Cyprus) Anorthosis Famagusta	9.332
(Slovenia) Maribor	7.415
(Israel) Hapoel Haifa	5.770
(Belarus) Dnepr-Transmash Mogilev	4.541

First qualifying round
Team	Coeff.
(Federal Republic of Yugoslavia) Partizan	7.124
(Latvia) Skonto	6.291
(Moldova) Zimbru Chișinău	6.166
(Bulgaria) Litex Lovech	4.791
(Finland) Haka	4.520
(Lithuania) Žalgiris	4.416
(Iceland) ÍBV	3.166
(North Macedonia) Sloga Jugomagnat	2.457
(Wales) Barry Town	1.916
(Estonia) Flora	1.291
(Armenia) Tsement Ararat	1.208
(Northern Ireland) Glentoran	0.999
(Republic of Ireland) St Patrick's Athletic	0.916
(Malta) Valletta	0.749
(Faroe Islands) HB	0.624
(Albania) Tirana	0.583
(Luxembourg) Jeunesse Esch	0.583
(Azerbaijan) Kapaz	0.458

== First qualifying round ==
The draw for this round was performed on 30 June 1999 in Geneva, Switzerland.

=== Seeding ===
Seeded	Unseeded
(Federal Republic of Yugoslavia) Partizan (Latvia) Skonto (Moldova) Zimbru Chișinău (Bulgaria) Litex Lovech (Finland) Haka (Lithuania) Žalgiris (Iceland) ÍBV (North Macedonia) Sloga Jugomagnat (Wales) Barry Town	(Estonia) Flora (Armenia) Tsement Ararat (Northern Ireland) Glentoran (Republic of Ireland) St Patrick's Athletic (Malta) Valletta (Faroe Islands) HB (Albania) Tirana (Luxembourg) Jeunesse Esch (Azerbaijan) Kapaz

=== Summary ===
Team 1	Agg.	Team 2	1st leg	2nd leg
ÍBV (Iceland)	3–1	(Albania) Tirana	1–0	2–1
Litex Lovech (Bulgaria)	5–0	(Northern Ireland) Glentoran	3–0	2–0
Žalgiris (Lithuania)	5–0	(Armenia) Tsement Ararat	2–0	3–0
HB (Faroe Islands)	1–7	(Finland) Haka	1–1	0–6
Partizan (Federal Republic of Yugoslavia)	10–1	(Estonia) Flora	6–0	4–1
Jeunesse Esch (Luxembourg)	0–10	(Latvia) Skonto	0–2	0–8
Sloga Jugomagnat (North Macedonia)	2–2 (a)	(Azerbaijan) Kapaz	1–0	1–2
Barry Town (Wales)	2–3	(Malta) Valletta	0–0	2–3
St Patrick's Athletic (Republic of Ireland)	0–10	(Moldova) Zimbru Chișinău	0–5	0–5

=== Matches ===
13 July 1999
20:00

ÍBV (Iceland)	1–0	(Albania) Tirana
S. Jóhannesson 45'	Report

Hásteinsvöllur, Vestmannaeyjar
Attendance: 790
Referee: Richard O'Hanlon (Republic of Ireland)
21 July 1999
17:30

Tirana (Albania)	1–2	(Iceland) ÍBV
Bulku 80'	Report	S. Jóhannesson 32'; Sigurdsson 45+3'

Qemal Stafa Stadium, Tirana
Attendance: 5,000
Referee: Robert Boggi (Italy)

ÍBV won 3–1 on aggregate.

14 July 1999
17:30

Litex Lovech (Bulgaria)	3–0	(Northern Ireland) Glentoran
Haxhi 12'; Bushi 34' (pen.); Petrov 81'	Report

Lovech Stadium, Lovech
Attendance: 5,000
Referee: Zoran Arsić (Serbia and Montenegro)
21 July 1999
20:30

Glentoran (Northern Ireland)	0–2	(Bulgaria) Litex Lovech
	Report	Haxhi 64'; Bushi 89'

The Oval, Belfast
Attendance: 2,005
Referee: Dick van Egmond (Netherlands)

Litex Lovech won 5–0 on aggregate.

14 July 1999
17:30

Žalgiris (Lithuania)	2–0	(Armenia) Tsement Ararat
I. Steško 45'; A. Steško 87'	Report

Žalgiris Stadium, Vilnius
Attendance: 1,000
Referee: Sten Johanzon (Sweden)
21 July 1999
15:00

Tsement Ararat (Armenia)	0–3	(Lithuania) Žalgiris
	Report	Novikovas 7'; Jokšas 30'; Vasiliauskas 65'

Hrazdan Stadium, Yerevan
Attendance: 504
Referee: Igor Horozhankin (Ukraine)

Žalgiris won 5–0 on aggregate.

14 July 1999
20:00

HB (Faroe Islands)	1–1	(Finland) Haka
Lajkuni 47'	Report	Popovitch 64'

Gundadalur Stadium, Tórshavn
Attendance: 1,600
Referee: Miroslaw Ryszka (Poland)
21 July 1999
18:00

Haka (Finland)	6–0	(Faroe Islands) HB
Salli 26'; Reynders 44'; Nyyssönen 47'; Wilson 62'; Popovitch 80'; Torkkeli 90'	Report

Tehtaan kenttä, Valkeakoski
Attendance: 2,241
Referee: Algirdas Dubinskas (Lithuania)

Haka won 7–1 on aggregate.

14 July 1999
19:30

Partizan (Federal Republic of Yugoslavia)	6–0	(Estonia) Flora
S. Ilić 12'; Peković 25', 71'; Ivić 36', 75'; Kežman 56'	Report

Partizan Stadium, Belgrade
Attendance: 10,000
Referee: Philippe Leuba (Switzerland)
21 July 1999
18:00

Flora (Estonia)	1–4	(Federal Republic of Yugoslavia) Partizan
Viikmäe 52'	Report	Kežman 10', 69'; S. Ilić 20'; Tomić 82'

Kadriorg Stadium, Tallinn
Attendance: 400
Referee: Tom Henning Øvrebø (Norway)

Partizan won 10–1 on aggregate.

14 July 1999
19:30

Jeunesse Esch (Luxembourg)	0–2	(Latvia) Skonto
	Report	Astafjevs 66'; Mihalops 73'

Stade de la Frontière, Esch-sur-Alzette
Attendance: 930
Referee: Lawrence Sammut (Malta)
21 July 1999
17:30

Skonto (Latvia)	8–0	(Luxembourg) Jeunesse Esch
Bleidelis 38', 50'; Miholaps 40', 54', 61', 84', 90'; Koļesņičenko 77'	Report

Skonto Stadium, Riga
Attendance: 1,100
Referee: Jan Hald (Denmark)

Skonto won 10–0 on aggregate.

14 July 1999
20:00

Sloga Jugomagnat (North Macedonia)	1–0	(Azerbaijan) Kapaz
Memedi 60'	Report

Čair Stadium, Skopje
Attendance: 1,000
Referee: Attila Juhos (Hungary)
21 July 1999
16:00

Kapaz (Azerbaijan)	2–1	(North Macedonia) Sloga Jugomagnat
Mammadov 20'; Rzayev 90' (pen.)	Report	Memedi 35'

Tofiq Bahramov Stadium, Baku
Attendance: 6,000
Referee: Gennady Yakubovsky (Belarus)

2–2 on aggregate; Sloga Jugomagnat won on away goals.

14 July 1999
20:30

Barry Town (Wales)	0–0	(Malta) Valletta
	Report

Jenner Park, Barry
Attendance: 2,500
Referee: Charles Schaack (Luxembourg)
21 July 1999
20:00

Valletta (Malta)	3–2	(Wales) Barry Town
G. Agius 42', 45+1'; Chetcuti 55'	Report	Sloan 47', 56'

Ta' Qali National Stadium, Ta' Qali
Attendance: 2,996
Referee: Bruno Derrien (France)

Valletta won 3–2 on aggregate.

14 July 1999
20:45

St Patrick's Athletic (Republic of Ireland)	0–5	(Moldova) Zimbru Chișinău
	Report	Beco 29', 41'; Epureanu 35', 89'; Boreț 70'

Richmond Park, Dublin
Attendance: 3,300
Referee: Lucílio Batista (Portugal)
21 July 1999
17:00

Zimbru Chișinău (Moldova)	5–0	(Republic of Ireland) St Patrick's Athletic
Tropanet 22', 40'; Boreț 30', 75'; Oprea 85'	Report

Stadionul Republican, Chişinău
Attendance: 4,000
Referee: Georgios Borovilos (Greece)

Zimbru Chișinău won 10–0 on aggregate.

== Second qualifying round ==
The draw for this round was performed on 30 June 1999 in Geneva, Switzerland. Unlike the future seasons of Champions League qualification, all winners of previous round were treated as unseeded regardless of their coefficients.

=== Seeding ===
Seeded		Unseeded	
(Ukraine) Dynamo Kyiv (Denmark) Brøndby (Austria) Rapid Wien (Turkey) Beşiktaş (Scotland) Rangers (Sweden) AIK (Russia) CSKA Moscow	(Poland) Widzew Łódź (Romania) Rapid București (Georgia (country)) Dinamo Tbilisi (Belgium) Genk (Slovakia) Slovan Bratislava (Hungary) MTK Hungária (Croatia) Rijeka	(Norway) Molde (Cyprus) Anorthosis Famagusta (Slovenia) Maribor (Israel) Hapoel Haifa (Belarus) Dnepr-Transmash Mogilev (Federal Republic of Yugoslavia) Partizan (Latvia) Skonto	(Moldova) Zimbru Chișinău (Bulgaria) Litex Lovech (Finland) Haka (Lithuania) Žalgiris (Iceland) ÍBV (North Macedonia) Sloga Jugomagnat (Malta) Valletta

Notes

1. ^{†} Winners of the previous qualifying round whose identity was not known at the time of the draw. Teams in italics defeated a team with a higher coefficient, thus effectively taking the coefficient of their opponent in the draw.

=== Summary ===
Team 1	Agg.	Team 2	1st leg	2nd leg
Rapid Wien (Austria)	5–0	(Malta) Valletta	3–0	2–0
Anorthosis Famagusta (Cyprus)	3–2	(Slovakia) Slovan Bratislava	2–1	1–1
Partizan (Federal Republic of Yugoslavia)	6–1	(Croatia) Rijeka	3–1	3–0
CSKA Moscow (Russia)	2–4	(Norway) Molde	2–0	0–4
Litex Lovech (Bulgaria)	5–5 (2–3 p)	(Poland) Widzew Łódź	4–1	1–4 (a.e.t.)
Haka (Finland)	1–7	(Scotland) Rangers	1–4	0–3
Dinamo Tbilisi (Georgia (country))	2–3	(Moldova) Zimbru Chișinău	2–1	0–2
Dnepr-Transmash Mogilev (Belarus)	0–3	(Sweden) AIK	0–1	0–2
Sloga Jugomagnat (North Macedonia)	0–2	(Denmark) Brøndby	0–1	0–1
Rapid București (Romania)	4–5	(Latvia) Skonto	3–3	1–2
Beşiktaş (Turkey)	1–1 (a)	(Israel) Hapoel Haifa	1–1	0–0
Dynamo Kyiv (Ukraine)	3–0	(Lithuania) Žalgiris	2–0	1–0
ÍBV (Iceland)	1–5	(Hungary) MTK Hungária	0–2	1–3
Maribor (Slovenia)	5–4	(Belgium) Genk	5–1	0–3

=== Matches ===
28 July 1999
20:30

Rapid Wien (Austria)	3–0	(Malta) Valletta
Dowe 54'; Savićević 74'; Penksa 86'	Report

Gerhard Hanappi Stadium, Vienna
Attendance: 14,500
Referee: Miroslav Vitković (Croatia)
4 August 1999
18:00

Valletta (Malta)	0–2	(Austria) Rapid Wien
	Report	Dowe 70'; Lagonikakis 88'

Ta' Qali National Stadium, Ta' Qali
Attendance: 1,525
Referee: Orhan Erdemir (Turkey)

Rapid Wien won 5–0 on aggregate.

28 July 1999
17:30

Anorthosis Famagusta (Cyprus)	2–1	(Slovakia) Slovan Bratislava
Obiku 25', 89' (pen.)	Report	Hrnčár 50'

Antonis Papadopoulos Stadium, Larnaca
Attendance: 4,711
Referee: Claus Bo Larsen (Denmark)
4 August 1999
18:00

Slovan Bratislava (Slovakia)	1–1	(Cyprus) Anorthosis Famagusta
Timko 59'	Report	Obiku 58'

Tehelné pole, Bratislava
Attendance: 10,900
Referee: Frank De Bleeckere (Belgium)

Anorthosis Famagusta won 3–2 on aggregate.

28 July 1999
20:15

Partizan (Federal Republic of Yugoslavia)	3–1	(Croatia) Rijeka
Ilić 10'; Krstajić 22', 86'	Report	Sztipánovics 56'

Partizan Stadium, Belgrade
Attendance: 21,746
Referee: Alain Hamer (Luxembourg)
4 August 1999
20:30

Rijeka (Croatia)	0–3	(Federal Republic of Yugoslavia) Partizan
	Report	Kežman 7', 82'; Ivić 18'

Stadion Kantrida, Rijeka
Attendance: 10,500
Referee: Günter Benkö (Austria)

Partizan won 6–1 on aggregate.

28 July 1999
18:00

CSKA Moscow (Russia)	2–0	(Norway) Molde
Şişchin 7'; Khomukha 85'	Report

Dynamo Stadium, Moscow
Attendance: 15,000
Referee: Manuel Mejuto González (Spain)
4 August 1999
18:00

Molde (Norway)	4–0	(Russia) CSKA Moscow
Tessem 48'; Berg Hestad 65'; Hoseth 67', 81'	Report

Aker Stadion, Molde
Attendance: 5,203
Referee: Gary Willard (England)

Molde won 4–2 on aggregate.

28 July 1999
17:30

Litex Lovech (Bulgaria)	4–1	(Poland) Widzew Łódź
Todorov 40', 78'; Živković 82' (pen.); Kondev 90'	Report	Wichniarek 88' (pen.)

Lovech Stadium, Lovech
Attendance: 3,500
Referee: Bernd Heynemann (Germany)
4 August 1999
20:15

Widzew Łódź (Poland)	4–1 (a.e.t.)	(Bulgaria) Litex Lovech
Gęsior 14'; Wichniarek 50', 59'; Michalski 75'	Report	Todorov 28'
Penalties
Michalski (penalty missed); Wichniarek (penalty missed); Gęsior (penalty scored); Stolarczyk (penalty scored); Terlecki (penalty scored)	3–2	(penalty scored) Živković; (penalty missed) Kolev; (penalty scored) Kondev; (penalty missed) Zagorčić; (penalty missed) Bushi

Stadion Widzewa, Łódź
Attendance: 3,353
Referee: Stéphane Bré (France)

5–5 on aggregate; Widzew Łódź won 3–2 on penalties.

28 July 1999
18:00

Haka (Finland)	1–4	(Scotland) Rangers
Niemi 51'	Report	Amoruso 18'; Mols 22', 42'; Johansson 86'

Tehtaan kenttä, Valkeakoski
Attendance: 3,341
Referee: Vladimír Hriňák (Slovakia)
4 August 1999
20:45

Rangers (Scotland)	3–0	(Finland) Haka
Wallace 14'; Johansson 28'; Amato 67'	Report

Ibrox Stadium, Glasgow
Attendance: 38,000
Referee: Lubomír Puček (Czech Republic)

Rangers won 7–1 on aggregate.

28 July 1999
16:00

Dinamo Tbilisi (Georgia (country))	2–1	(Moldova) Zimbru Chișinău
Tsitaishvili 81'; Khomeriki 90'	Report	Berco 67'

Boris Paichadze National Stadium, Tbilisi
Attendance: 5,000
Referee: Dietmar Drabek (Austria)
4 August 1999
17:00

Zimbru Chișinău (Moldova)	2–0	(Georgia (country)) Dinamo Tbilisi
Dodul 20'; Epureanu 89'	Report

Stadionul Republican, Chişinău
Attendance: 6,960
Referee: Luc Huyghe (Belgium)

Zimbru Chișinău won 3–2 on aggregate.

28 July 1999
17:00

Dnepr-Transmash Mogilev (Belarus)	0–1	(Sweden) AIK
	Report	Tjernström 89'

Dinamo Stadium, Minsk
Attendance: 4,300
Referee: Alan Snoddy (Northern Ireland)
4 August 1999
19:00

AIK (Sweden)	2–0	(Belarus) Dnepr-Transmash Mogilev
Corneliusson 54'; Gustafsson 83'	Report

Råsunda Stadium, Solna
Attendance: 11,857
Referee: Stuart Dougal (Scotland)

AIK won 3–0 on aggregate.

28 July 1999
20:00

Sloga Jugomagnat (North Macedonia)	0–1	(Denmark) Brøndby
	Report	Daugaard 15'

Philip II Arena, Skopje
Attendance: 5,000
Referee: Jack van Hulten (Netherlands)
4 August 1999
20:45

Brøndby (Denmark)	1–0	(North Macedonia) Sloga Jugomagnat
Daugaard 3' (pen.)	Report

Brøndby Stadium, Brøndbyvester
Attendance: 8,538
Referee: Vasyl Melnychuk (Ukraine)

Brøndby won 2–0 on aggregate.

28 July 1999
16:30

Rapid București (Romania)	3–3	(Latvia) Skonto
Barbu 14'; Schumacher 53'; Mutică 73'	Report	Chaladze 4', 33'; Astafjevs 61'

Stadionul Giulești-Valentin Stănescu, Bucharest
Attendance: 4,150
Referee: Oğuz Sarvan (Turkey)
4 August 1999
20:00

Skonto (Latvia)	2–1	(Romania) Rapid București
Laizāns 77'; Rubins 87'	Report	Răducan 32'

Daugava Stadium, Riga
Attendance: 2,850
Referee: Kenny Clark (Scotland)

Skonto won 5–4 on aggregate.

28 July 1999
19:45

Beşiktaş (Turkey)	1–1	(Israel) Hapoel Haifa
Akman 90+1'	Report	Rosso 76'

BJK İnönü Stadium, Istanbul
Attendance: 12,000
Referee: Paul Durkin (England)
4 August 1999
19:30

Hapoel Haifa (Israel)	0–0	(Turkey) Beşiktaş
	Report

Kiryat Eliezer Stadium, Haifa
Attendance: 12,000
Referee: Lutz Michael Fröhlich (Germany)

1–1 on aggregate; Hapoel Haifa won on away goals.

28 July 1999
18:00

Dynamo Kyiv (Ukraine)	2–0	(Lithuania) Žalgiris
Shatskikh 38', 76'	Report

Olimpiyskiy NSC, Kyiv
Attendance: 14,600
Referee: Graham Poll (England)
4 August 1999
17:00

Žalgiris (Lithuania)	0–1	(Ukraine) Dynamo Kyiv
	Report	Rebrov 35'

Žalgiris Stadium, Vilnius
Attendance: 3,500
Referee: Georg Dardenne (Germany)

Dynamo Kyiv won 3–0 on aggregate.

28 July 1999
21:00

ÍBV (Iceland)	0–2	(Hungary) MTK Hungária
	Report	Halmai 18'; Preisinger 72'

Hásteinsvöllur, Vestmannaeyjar
Attendance: 827
Referee: Terje Hauge (Norway)
4 August 1999
20:45

MTK Hungária (Hungary)	3–1	(Iceland) ÍBV
Ilea 9'; Kuttor 24'; Illés 40'	Report	Bjarklind 89'

Hidegkuti Nándor Stadium, Budapest
Attendance: 2,000
Referee: Miroslav Radoman (Serbia and Montenegro)

MTK Hungária won 5–1 on aggregate.

28 July 1999
20:00

Maribor (Slovenia)	5–1	(Belgium) Genk
Balajić 24'; Galič 61'; Karič 68' (pen.); Šimundža 76'; Djuranovič 90+3'	Report	Strupar 33'

Ljudski vrt, Maribor
Attendance: 3,958
Referee: Fiorenzo Treossi (Italy)
4 August 1999
20:30

Genk (Belgium)	3–0	(Slovenia) Maribor
Guðjónsson 45', 58'; Horváth 61'	Report

Stade Maurice Dufrasne, Liège
Attendance: 6,779
Referee: Juan Ansuátegui Roca (Spain)

Maribor won 5–4 on aggregate.

== Third qualifying round ==
The draw for this round was performed on 23 July 1999 in Geneva, Switzerland. Unlike the future seasons of Champions League qualification, all winners of previous round were treated as unseeded regardless of their coefficients.

=== Seeding ===
Seeded		Unseeded	
(Italy) Parma (Germany) Borussia Dortmund (Russia) Spartak Moscow (England) Chelsea (Netherlands) PSV Eindhoven (France) Lyon (Italy) Fiorentina (Spain) Valencia	(Spain) Mallorca (Greece) AEK Athens (Turkey) Galatasaray; Croatia Zagreb (Germany) Hertha BSC (Portugal) Boavista (Austria) Sturm Graz (Denmark) AaB	(Switzerland) Servette (Czech Republic) Teplice (Ukraine) Dynamo Kyiv (Denmark) Brøndby (Austria) Rapid Wien (Israel) Hapoel Haifa (Scotland) Rangers (Sweden) AIK	(Norway) Molde (Poland) Widzew Łódź (Latvia) Skonto (Moldova) Zimbru Chișinău (Slovenia) Maribor (Cyprus) Anorthosis Famagusta (Hungary) MTK Hungária (Federal Republic of Yugoslavia) Partizan

Notes

1. ^{†} Winners of the previous qualifying round whose identity was not known at the time of the draw. Teams in italics defeated a team with a higher coefficient, thus effectively taking the coefficient of their opponent in the draw.

=== Summary ===
The losing teams advanced to the first round of the 1999–2000 UEFA Cup.

Team 1	Agg.	Team 2	1st leg	2nd leg
Zimbru Chișinău (Moldova)	0–2	(Netherlands) PSV Eindhoven	0–0	0–2
Spartak Moscow (Russia)	5–1	(Federal Republic of Yugoslavia) Partizan	2–0	3–1
Chelsea (England)	3–0	(Latvia) Skonto	3–0	0–0
Rapid Wien (Austria)	0–4	(Turkey) Galatasaray	0–3	0–1
Fiorentina (Italy)	5–1	(Poland) Widzew Łódź	3–1	2–0
AaB (Denmark)	3–4	(Ukraine) Dynamo Kyiv	1–2	2–2
Rangers (Scotland)	2–1	(Italy) Parma	2–0	0–1
Brøndby (Denmark)	3–6	(Portugal) Boavista	1–2	2–4 (a.e.t.)
AEK Athens (Greece)	0–1	(Sweden) AIK	0–0	0–1
Hapoel Haifa (Israel)	0–4	(Spain) Valencia	0–2	0–2
Hertha BSC (Germany)	2–0	(Cyprus) Anorthosis Famagusta	2–0	0–0
Sturm Graz (Austria)	4–3	(Switzerland) Servette	2–1	2–2
Molde (Norway)	1–1 (a)	(Spain) Mallorca	0–0	1–1
Lyon (France)	0–3	(Slovenia) Maribor	0–1	0–2
Croatia Zagreb	2–0	(Hungary) MTK Hungária	0–0	2–0
Teplice (Czech Republic)	0–2	(Germany) Borussia Dortmund	0–1	0–1

=== Matches ===
11 August 1999
20:30

Zimbru Chișinău (Moldova)	0–0	(Netherlands) PSV Eindhoven
	Report

Stadionul Republican, Chişinău
Attendance: 8,500
Referee: Georgios Bikas (Greece)
25 August 1999
20:00

PSV Eindhoven (Netherlands)	2–0	(Moldova) Zimbru Chișinău
Nilis 80'; Ooijer 88'	Report

Philips Stadion, Eindhoven
Attendance: 23,000
Referee: Günter Benkö (Austria)

PSV Eindhoven won 2–0 on aggregate.

11 August 1999
18:00

Spartak Moscow (Russia)	2–0	(Federal Republic of Yugoslavia) Partizan
Shirko 37'; Tikhonov 73'	Report

Luzhniki Stadium, Moscow
Attendance: 42,000
Referee: Bernd Heynemann (Germany)
25 August 1999
20:15

Partizan (Federal Republic of Yugoslavia)	1–3	(Russia) Spartak Moscow
Kežman 73'	Report	Shirko 19', 46'; Titov 85' (pen.)

Partizan Stadium, Belgrade
Attendance: 18,216
Referee: Antonio López Nieto (Spain)

Spartak Moscow won 5–1 on aggregate.

11 August 1999
21:05

Chelsea (England)	3–0	(Latvia) Skonto
Babayaro 76'; Poyet 78'; Sutton 84'	Report

Stamford Bridge, London
Attendance: 22,043
Referee: Urs Meier (Switzerland)
25 August 1999
18:30

Skonto (Latvia)	0–0	(England) Chelsea
	Report

Skonto Stadium, Riga
Attendance: 5,600
Referee: Gilles Veissière (France)

Chelsea won 3–0 on aggregate.

11 August 1999
19:30

Rapid Wien (Austria)	0–3	(Turkey) Galatasaray
	Report	Ünsal 34'; Akyel 38'; Hagi 90+1'

Ernst-Happel-Stadion, Vienna
Attendance: 30,200
Referee: Kim Milton Nielsen (Denmark)
25 August 1999
20:30

Galatasaray (Turkey)	1–0	(Austria) Rapid Wien
Okan Buruk 52'	Report

Ali Sami Yen Stadium, Istanbul
Attendance: 15,946
Referee: Pierluigi Collina (Italy)

Galatasaray won 4–0 on aggregate.

11 August 1999
20:45

Fiorentina (Italy)	3–1	(Poland) Widzew Łódź
Adani 17'; Cois 57'; Rui Costa 89'	Report	Adani 73' (o.g.)

Stadio Artemio Franchi, Florence
Attendance: 30,601
Referee: David Elleray (England)
25 August 1999
18:00

Widzew Łódź (Poland)	0–2	(Italy) Fiorentina
	Report	Chiesa 39'; Cois 67'

Stadion Widzewa, Łódź
Attendance: 6,500
Referee: Alain Sars (France)

Fiorentina won 5–1 on aggregate.

11 August 1999
18:30

AaB (Denmark)	1–2	(Ukraine) Dynamo Kyiv
Strandli 55'	Report	Rebrov 13'; Shatskikh 39'

Aalborg Stadion, Aalborg
Attendance: 8,492
Referee: Atanas Uzunov (Bulgaria)
25 August 1999
18:00

Dynamo Kyiv (Ukraine)	2–2	(Denmark) AaB
Husin 74'; Shatskikh 90+1'	Report	Oper 9'; Gaarde 47'

Dynamo Stadium, Kyiv
Attendance: 15,000
Referee: Michel Piraux (Belgium)

Dynamo Kyiv won 4–3 on aggregate.

11 August 1999
21:05

Rangers (Scotland)	2–0	(Italy) Parma
Vidmar 34'; Reyna 75'	Report

Ibrox Stadium, Glasgow
Attendance: 49,263
Referee: José García-Aranda (Spain)
25 August 1999
21:00

Parma (Italy)	1–0	(Scotland) Rangers
Walem 68'	Report

Stadio Ennio Tardini, Parma
Attendance: 24,087
Referee: Karl-Erik Nilsson (Sweden)

Rangers won 2–1 on aggregate.

11 August 1999
20:45

Brøndby (Denmark)	1–2	(Portugal) Boavista
Smith 65'	Report	Silva 25'; Moreira 73'

Brøndby Stadium, Brøndbyvester
Attendance: 9,060
Referee: Nikolay Levnikov (Russia)
25 August 1999
22:00

Boavista (Portugal)	4–2 (a.e.t.)	(Denmark) Brøndby
Litos 13'; Ahinful 100', 110'; Rui Bento 117'	Report	Christensen 47'; Bjur 90'

Estádio do Bessa, Porto
Attendance: 9,000
Referee: Pascal Garibian (France)

Boavista won 6–3 on aggregate.

11 August 1999
20:15

AEK Athens (Greece)	0–0	(Sweden) AIK
	Report

Nikos Goumas Stadium, Nea Filadelfeia
Attendance: 17,786
Referee: Juan Fernández Marin (Spain)
25 August 1999
19:00

AIK (Sweden)	1–0	(Greece) AEK Athens
Novaković 57'	Report

Råsunda Stadium, Solna
Attendance: 31,115
Referee: Graziano Cesari (Italy)

AIK won 1–0 on aggregate.

11 August 1999
19:30

Hapoel Haifa (Israel)	0–2	(Spain) Valencia
	Report	López 68'; Farinós 75'

Kiryat Eliezer Stadium, Haifa
Attendance: 13,500
Referee: Markus Merk (Germany)
25 August 1999
22:00

Valencia (Spain)	2–0	(Israel) Hapoel Haifa
Sánchez 59', 66'	Report

Mestalla, Valencia
Attendance: 23,157
Referee: Anders Frisk (Sweden)

Valencia won 4–0 on aggregate.

11 August 1999
20:45

Hertha BSC (Germany)	2–0	(Cyprus) Anorthosis Famagusta
Daei 2'; Preetz 58'	Report

Olympic Stadium, Berlin
Attendance: 42,500
Referee: Hugh Dallas (Scotland)
25 August 1999
18:00

Anorthosis Famagusta (Cyprus)	0–0	(Germany) Hertha BSC
	Report

Antonis Papadopoulos Stadium, Larnaca
Attendance: 8,000
Referee: Eric Romain (Belgium)

Hertha BSC won 2–0 on aggregate.

11 August 1999
21:15

Sturm Graz (Austria)	2–1	(Switzerland) Servette
Vastić 33'; Martens 45'	Report	Lonfat 45+3'

Stadion Graz-Liebenau, Graz
Attendance: 10,688
Referee: Lucílio Batista (Portugal)
25 August 1999
20:45

Servette (Switzerland)	2–2	(Austria) Sturm Graz
Juárez 50'; Thurre 89'	Report	Kocijan 54'; Vastić 78'

Charmilles Stadium, Geneva
Attendance: 8,400
Referee: Graham Barber (England)

Sturm Graz won 4–3 on aggregate.

11 August 1999
20:00

Molde (Norway)	0–0	(Spain) Mallorca
	Report

Aker Stadion, Molde
Attendance: 8,573
Referee: Mario van der Ende (Netherlands)
25 August 1999
21:30

Mallorca (Spain)	1–1	(Norway) Molde
Stanković 21' (pen.)	Report	Lund 84' (pen.)

Son Moix Stadium, Palma de Mallorca
Attendance: 23,000
Referee: Stefano Braschi (Italy)

1–1 on aggregate; Molde won on away goals.

10 August 1999
20:30

Lyon (France)	0–1	(Slovenia) Maribor
	Report	Filipović 88'

Stade de Gerland, Lyon
Attendance: 25,365
Referee: Sergei Khusainov (Russia)
25 August 1999
20:30

Maribor (Slovenia)	2–0	(France) Lyon
Šimundža 23'; Balajić 45'	Report

Ljudski vrt, Maribor
Attendance: 7,021
Referee: Oğuz Sarvan (Turkey)

Maribor won 3–0 on aggregate.

11 August 1999
20:15

Croatia Zagreb	0–0	(Hungary) MTK Hungária
	Report

Stadion Maksimir, Zagreb
Attendance: 15,000
Referee: Graham Poll (England)
25 August 1999
20:15

MTK Hungária (Hungary)	0–2	Croatia Zagreb
	Report	Šimić 58', 86'

Hidegkuti Nándor Stadium, Budapest
Attendance: 5,238
Referee: Jan Wegereef (Netherlands)

Croatia Zagreb won 2–0 on aggregate.

11 August 1999
18:00

Teplice (Czech Republic)	0–1	(Germany) Borussia Dortmund
	Report	Nerlinger 66'

Na Stínadlech, Teplice
Attendance: 16,853
Referee: Dermot Gallagher (England)
25 August 1999
20:30

Borussia Dortmund (Germany)	1–0	(Czech Republic) Teplice
Herrlich 90'	Report

Westfalenstadion, Dortmund
Attendance: 48,000
Referee: Alfredo Trentalange (Italy)

Borussia Dortmund won 2–0 on aggregate.
