= Martin Smith =

Martin Smith may refer to:

== Arts and entertainment ==
- Martin Seymour-Smith (1928–1998), British poet, literary critic, biographer and astrologer
- Martin Cruz Smith (1942–2025), American writer
- Martin Smith (drummer) (1946–1997), British drummer for Gentle Giant and Simon Dupree and the Big Sound
- Martin Smith (potter) (born 1950), English potter and professor of ceramics and glass
- Martin Smith (entertainer) (1957–1994), British actor, singer and composer
- Martin Smith (documentarian) (born 1949), American filmmaker for the series Frontline
- Martin Smith (English musician) (born 1970), vocalist, guitarist and songwriter primarily working in Christian music.
- Martin Smith (film maker), Scottish BAFTA winning writer/director of Tracks

== Government and politics ==
- Martin Tucker Smith (1803–1880), British banker and Member of Parliament for Wycombe and Midhurst
- Martin F. Smith (1891–1954), American politician
- Martin T. Smith (1934–2015), American politician and lawyer
- Martin Hamilton-Smith (born 1953), South Australian politician
- Martin Smith (activist) (born 1963), British political activist

== Sports ==
- Martin Smith (swimmer) (born 1958), British swimmer
- Martin Smith (footballer, born 1974), British former professional footballer
- Martin Smith (snooker player) (born 1961), British snooker player
- Martin Smith (footballer, born 1995), British footballer
- Martin Smith (figure skater) (born 1968), Canadian ice dancer
- Martin D. Smith (footballer) (born 1978), Danish football defender
- Martin Smith (golfer), Australian golfer

== Business ==
- Martin V. Smith (1916–2001), American developer and philanthropist
- Martin G. Smith (born 1943), English banker

== Other ==
- Martin Smith (cyberneticist), British cyberneticist and academic
- Martin Smith (designer) (born 1949), British automobile designer
- Martin Smith (Royal Marines officer) (born 1962), Commandant General Royal Marines
- Martin Luther Smith (1819–1866), American soldier and civil engineer
- Martin Ferguson Smith (born 1940), British scholar and writer
- Martin D. Smith (environmental economist) (born 1970), American environmental economist
- Martin Linton Smith (1869–1950), British Anglican bishop

== See also ==
- Martin Smyth (born 1931), Northern Ireland unionist politician, MP for Belfast South 1982–2005
- Martin Smyth (boxer) (1936–2012), Irish boxer
- Martyn Smith (disambiguation)
- Marty Smith (disambiguation)
