= Nexhmedin =

Nexhmedin or Nedžmedin is an Albanian masculine given name. Notable people with the name include:

- Nedžmedin Memedi (born 1966), Albanian footballer
- Nexhmedin Zajmi (1916–1991), Albanian painter and sculptor
