= Martyn Smith =

Martyn Smith may refer to:

- Martyn Smith (producer), British television producer
- Martyn Smith (footballer) (born 1961), English footballer
- Martyn Smith (rugby league) (born 1992), English rugby league footballer

== See also ==
- Martin Smith (disambiguation)
