= Novikovas =

- Lithuanian surname
- m.: Novikovas
- f.: (unmarried): Novikovaitė
- f.: (married): Novikovienė
- f.: (short): Novikova

Novikovas is the Lithuanized form of the Russian surname Novikov. Notable persons with the surname include:

- Arvydas Novikovas (born 18 December 1990) is a Lithuanian professional footballer
- Sergejus Novikovas (born 5 May 1972) is a Lithuanian football defender
- Vitalijus Novikovas (born 1958), Lithuanian International Correspondence Chess Master
