= Petr Samec =

Czech footballer and manager

Personal information
- Date of birth: 14 February 1964 (age 62)
- Place of birth: Frýdek-Místek, Czechoslovakia
- Position: Forward

Youth career
- 1973–1980: NH Ostrava
- 1982–1984: Sokol Hrabůvka

Senior career*
Years	Team	Apps	(Gls)
1984–1986	RH Planá		
1986–1987	TJ Vítkovice		
1987	NH Ostrava		
1988–1989	Baník Havířov		
1990	Sigma Olomouc		
1990–1991	Banik Havířov		
1991	Dynamo České Budějovice		
1992	Gera Drnovice		
1992–1995	Union Cheb		
1995–1996	SKP Hradec Králové		
1996–2000	Baník Ostrava		
2001	FC Roubina Dolní Kounice		
2001–2003	FC Hlučín		
2005–2006	Sokol Krasné Pole		

International career
1994–1995	Czech Republic	9	(2)

Managerial career
- 2003–2004: FC Hlučín
- 2007–2010: FC Hlučín
- * Club domestic league appearances and goals

Petr Samec (born 14 February 1964) is a Czech former footballer who played as a forward for several Czech clubs. He was a prolific goalscorer, and with nine goals he was the top goalscorer of the 1995–96 UEFA Cup Winners' Cup.
