= Go Back to Where You Came From =

Australian TV documentary series

- Directed by: Ivan O'Mahoney
- Presented by: Dr David Corlett
- Narrated by: Colin Friels
- Theme music composer: Hans Baker
- Composer: Gordon Wittoch
- Country of origin: Australia
- Original language: English
- No. of seasons: 4
- No. of episodes: 13

Production
- Executive producers: Peter Newman, John Godfrey, Michael Cordell, Nick Murray
- Producer: Rick McPhee
- Cinematography: Ben Foley, Mark Hooper, Nick McInerney
- Editor: Tomas O'Brien
- Running time: 60 minutes
- Production company: Cordell Jigsaw Productions

Original release
- Network: SBS TV
- Release: 21 June 2011 – 4 October 2018

Go Back to Where You Came From is an Australian TV documentary series. It was produced by Cordell Jigsaw Productions and broadcast in 2011 (Season 1), 2012 (Season 2), 2015 (Season 3) and 2018 (Season 4) on SBS.

The series followed two parties, each of six Australians, all members having differing opinions on Australia's asylum seeker debate, being taken on a journey in reverse to that which refugees have taken to reach Australia.

== Season 1 ==
The six Australian participants were Gleny Rae, Adam Hartup, Raquel Moore, Darren Hassan, Raye Colbey, and Roderick Schneider. Deprived of their wallets, phones and passports, they board a leaky refugee boat (from which they are rescued mid-ocean), experience immigration raids in Malaysia, live in Kakuma Refugee Camp in far north-west Kenya, visit slums in Jordan before ultimately making it to the Democratic Republic of the Congo and Iraq, protected by UN Peacekeepers and the US military. In the final episode, the participants are debriefed for their response to the experiences.

== Season 2 – Celebrity Go Back ==
The celebrity participants for the 2012 season were Peter Reith, Angry Anderson, Allan Asher, Catherine Deveny, Mike Smith and Imogen Bailey. The participants were placed on a rickety boat bound for Christmas Island.

Over three episodes, the six Australians also experienced mortal danger on the streets of the world's deadliest cities – from the sweltering, war-torn capital of Somalia, Mogadishu, to the riotous streets of Kabul, freezing amidst the mountains of Afghanistan. They also travelled to the Christmas Island Detention Centre.

== Season 3 ==
The six participants for the 2015 season were Davy (former refugee), Kim ('Stop the Boats' Facebook campaigner), Nicole Judge (detention centre whistle blower), Jodi and Renee (sisters with opposing views) and Andrew (a tough-talking school teacher).

== Season 4 – Go Back to Where You Came From Live ==
Three episodes were shown on 2–4 October 2018, including live crosses to the participants as events unfolded. The episodes were hosted from a studio with hosts Ray Martin and Janice Petersen. Participants included Jacqui Lambie, Marina (Sydney lawyer and former refugee from Sarajevo), Steve (former prison guard from Adelaide), Gretel Killeen, Peter Everitt and Meshel Laurie.

== Reception ==
On its premiere night, the series became the number one trending topic on Twitter worldwide.

Go Back To Where You Came From's viewing figures made it the highest-rating programme for SBS in 2011. An estimated 524,000 metropolitan viewers watched the first episode, followed by 569,000 for the second and 600,000 for the third.

The broadcaster subsequently held a televised forum event to reflect on the series and the public debate about asylum seekers.

In 2019, TV Week listed Go Back to Where You Came From at No. 94 in its list of the 101 greatest Australian television shows of all time, which appeared in its monthly TV Week Close Up publication. The magazine recognised the show for introducing Australian audiences to powerful, immersive television during the heat of the asylum seeker debate, and for its achievement in being the top trend on Twitter internationally when it debuted.

== Episodes ==
=== Season 1 ===
Episode 1

- Liverpool, New South Wales, Australia – refugee resettlement
- Albury, New South Wales, Australia – refugee resettlement
- Villawood Immigration Detention Centre, New South Wales, Australia
- Boat crossing, Timor Sea

Episode 2

- Immigration housing, Kuala Lumpur, Malaysia
- Construction site immigration raid, Malaysia

Episode 3

- Kakuma Refugee Camp in far north-west Kenya
- Slums in Jordan
- Warzone in Democratic Republic of the Congo
- Warzone in Iraq

=== Season 2 ===
Episode 1

- Melbourne, Victoria – refugee resettlement
- Kabul, Afghanistan
- Mogadishu, Somalia

Episode 2

- Kabul, Afghanistan
- Mogadishu, Somalia
- Dollo Addo refugee camp, Ethiopia, ran by the UNHCR

Episode 3

- Bogor, Indonesia – meeting Hazara refugees
- Rote Island (Pulau Rote or Roti), Indonesia – meeting people smugglers
- Boat journey to Christmas Island
- Christmas Island Immigration Reception and Processing Centre

=== Season 3 ===
Episode 1

- Bankstown, New South Wales – refugee resettlement
- Lakemba, New South Wales – refugee resettlement
- Wickham Point Immigration Detention Centre, Darwin, Northern Territory
- Jakarta, Indonesia — 'Boat turn back'

Episode 2

- Makassar, Indonesia – living with refugees

== Go Back To Where You Came From Live ==
=== Season 1 ===
Episode 1

- South Sudan refugee camp

Episode 2

- Turkey
- Syria

== Ratings ==
- Episode 1 – 524,000 23rd for the night
- Episode 2 – 569,000 24th for the night
- Episode 3 – 600,000 19th for the night

== International remakes ==
The series has had international versions after the concept was sold to the following countries:

- United Kingdom (Channel 4) by the name of Go Back to Where You Came From
- Belgium (Vier) by the name of Terug naar eigen land
- Denmark (TV2 Denmark) by the name of Send Dem Hjem
- Germany (Studio Hamburg DocLights) by the name of Auf der Flucht: Das Experiment
- The Netherlands (Tuvalu Media) by the name of Rot Op Naar Je Eigen Land
- Sweden (Snowman Productions)
- South Africa (Curious Pictures)
- Israel (Keshet Broadcasting)
- United States (BBC America)

== See also ==
- Immigration detention in Australia
- Pacific Solution
