= Big Zuu's Big Eats =

Television cookery show with comedy

- Genre: Reality; Comedy; Cookery show
- Starring: Big Zuu; Tubsey; Hyder
- Country of origin: United Kingdom
- Original language: English
- No. of series: 4
- No. of episodes: 38

Production
- Running time: 40 minutes

Original release
- Network: Dave
- Release: 15 May 2020 – 13 November 2023

Big Zuu's Big Eats is a British comedy television series that premiered on 15 May 2020, on Dave. It stars rapper and grime artist Big Zuu, along with friends Tubsey and Hyder. In each episode they meet a celebrity and discuss memorable and favourite foods, following which the trio cook a meal for the celebrity.

In May 2023, it was confirmed that the Big Zuu's Big Eats would return with a fourth and final series later in 2023; which premiered on 25 September 2023.

== Format ==
The first series was filmed in autumn 2019, and saw Zuu, Tubsey and Hyder cook for comedians on tour, travelling the country in a branded food truck. In each episode, Zuu met with the comedian at a performing venue, and the two discussed food likes and dislikes. From this, Zuu would create a four-course menu - an amuse-bouche, followed by a three-course meal consisting of a starter, main course, and dessert. Footage of Zuu, Tubsey and Hyder shopping for ingredients - frequently favouring local businesses over national chains - would follow, interspersed with clips from the comedian's live performance. In the food truck, Zuu would demonstrate how to make the dishes discussed, with assistance from Tubsey and Hyder. The amuse-bouche would be served to the comedian shortly before they performed on stage that evening, or during a break in the show. After their show, the comedian and Zuu would sit down together at the venue for the three-course meal.

The final two episodes of the first series consisted of Christmas specials featuring multiple guests, from the worlds of music and comedy, with Christmas-themed menus. Due to the impact of the Coronavirus pandemic on performing arts, series two and three saw the trio meeting up with a wider range of celebrities in a variety of locations. The format of a conversation about food, followed by shopping for ingredients, the cooking and the eating of the meal remained, though the 'filler' activities would vary - for example, Harry Redknapp is seen teaching Zuu how to play golf.

== Series overview ==
Series	Episodes	Originally released	
Series	Episodes	First released	Last released
1	12	15 May 2020	18 December 2020
2	10	7 June 2021	9 August 2021
3	8	4 July 2022	22 August 2022
4	8	25 September 2023	13 November 2023

== Episodes ==
=== Series 1 (2020) ===
No. overall	No. in series	Celebrity Guest	Original release date
1	1	Jimmy Carr	15 May 2020
2	2	Rosie Jones	22 May 2020
3	3	Guz Khan	29 May 2020
4	4	Phil Wang	5 June 2020
5	5	Desiree Burch	12 June 2020
6	6	Jamali Maddix	26 June 2020
7	7	Josh Widdicombe	3 July 2020
8	8	London Hughes	10 July 2020
9	9	Ed Gamble	17 July 2020
10	10	Lou Sanders	24 July 2020
11	11	Christmas Eats - Music Special	11 December 2020
12	12	Christmas Eats - Comedy Special	18 December 2020

=== Series 2 (2021) ===
No. overall	No. in series	Celebrity Guest	Original release date
13	1	Maya Jama	7 June 2021
14	2	James Acaster	14 June 2021
15	3	Harry Redknapp	21 June 2021
16	4	Judi Love	28 June 2021
17	5	Jacob Anderson	5 July 2021
18	6	Rose Matafeo	12 July 2021
19	7	Mo Gilligan	19 July 2021
20	8	Mel Giedroyc	26 July 2021
21	9	Rob Delaney	2 August 2021
22	10	Natasia Demetriou	9 August 2021

=== Series 3 (2022) ===
No. overall	No. in series	Celebrity Guest	Original release date
23	1	Johnny Vegas	4 July 2022
24	2	Katherine Ryan	11 July 2022
25	3	Joseph Marcell	18 July 2022
26	4	Alex Brooker	25 July 2022
27	5	Mel B	1 August 2022
28	6	Lucy Beaumont	8 August 2022
29	7	Fatiha El-Ghorri	15 August 2022
30	8	Big Narstie	22 August 2022

=== Series 4 (2023) ===
No. overall	No. in series	Celebrity Guest	Original release date
31	1	Jonathan Ross	25 September 2023
32	2	Roisin Conaty	2 October 2023
33	3	Mo Farah	9 October 2023
34	4	Ellie Taylor	16 October 2023
35	5	Aitch	23 October 2023
36	6	Alex Scott	30 October 2023
37	7	Sarah Kendall	6 November 2023
38	8	Nabil Abdulrashid	13 November 2023

== Critical response ==
The show received favourable reviews, and in the 2021 BAFTAs received a nomination for Best Feature. At the 2022 BAFTAs the show won the award for Best Feature and Big Zuu won the award for Best Entertainment Performance. At the Broadcast Awards, Big Zuu's Big Eats received the Gamechanger Programme of the Year in 2021 and the Best Popular Factual Programme award in 2023.

The widening of the format for series two, necessitated by the Coronavirus pandemic, was regarded as a positive move for the show. The publicity which followed the show's two BAFTA wins highlighted the refugee backgrounds of the three hosts, and was welcomed by the Refugee Council as a positive portrayal of refugees and their families. The show was compared positively to other well-established cookery shows and formats.

The Daily Telegraph's Anita Singh and The Observer's Barbara Ellen both reviewed the third series four out of five stars.
