= List of Faking It (British TV series) episodes =

This is an episode list of the Channel 4/5 reality television show Faking It.

== Series overview ==
Series	Episodes	Originally released		
Series	Episodes	First released	Last released	Network
1	2	18 September 2000	26 September 2000	Channel 4
2	3	17 April 2001	1 May 2001	Channel 4
3	4	6 November 2001	27 November 2001	Channel 4
4	11	26 September 2002	30 December 2002	Channel 4
5	6	3 February 2004	2 March 2004	Channel 4
6	3	5 September 2004	19 September 2004	Channel 4
Specials	2	27 March 2005	26 December 2006	Channel 4
7	3	20 May 2025	3 June 2025	5

== Episodes ==
=== Series 1 (2000) ===
No. overall	No. in series	Title	Original release date	UK viewers (millions)
1	1	"Alex the Animal"	18 September 2000	2.01
2	2	"Shop Girl to It Girl"	26 September 2000	2.45

=== Series 2 (2001) ===
No. overall	No. in series	Title	Original release date	UK viewers (millions)
3	1	"Cellist to DJ"	17 April 2001	2.22
4	2	"Vicar to Car Dealer"	24 April 2001	N/A
5	3	"Painter and Decorator to Conceptual Artist"	1 May 2001	N/A

=== Series 3 (2001) ===
No. overall	No. in series	Title	Original release date	UK viewers (millions)
6	1	"Burgerman to Chef"	6 November 2001	2.50
7	2	"Sheep Shearer to Hairdresser"	13 November 2001	2.46
8	3	"Ballet Dancer to Wrestler"	20 November 2001	N/A
9	4	"Showgirl to Showjumper"	27 November 2001	2.58

=== Series 4 (2002) ===
No. overall	No. in series	Title	Original release date	UK viewers (millions)
10	1	"Faking It Changed My Life"	26 September 2002	2.12
11	2	"Naval Officer to Drag Queen"	2 October 2002	2.35
12	3	"Emergency Control Operator to TV Studio Director"	9 October 2002	1.80
13	4	"Lawyer to Garage MC"	16 October 2002	N/A
14	5	"Kickboxer to Ballroom Dancer"	23 October 2002	2.13
15	6	"Insurance Salesman to Stuntman"	30 October 2002	1.86
16	7	"Web Designer to Surfer"	6 November 2002	2.18
17	8	"Radiographer to Fashion Photographer"	13 November 2002	2.11
18	9	"Games Tester to Racing Driver"	4 December 2002	2.58
19	10	"Ferry Stewardess to Yachtswoman"	11 December 2002	2.58
20	11	"Punk Rocker to Orchestra Conductor"	30 December 2002	2.32

=== Series 5 (2004) ===
No. overall	No. in series	Title	Original release date	UK viewers (millions)
21	1	"Faking It Changed My Life"	3 February 2004	N/A
22	2	"Bicycle Courier to Polo Player"	3 February 2004	N/A
23	3	"Choir Girl to Rock Chick"	10 February 2004	2.78
24	4	"Management Consultant to Dog Trainer"	17 February 2004	3.21
25	5	"Newsagent to Showbiz Reporter"	24 February 2004	2.36
26	6	"Chess Player to Football Manager"	2 March 2004	N/A

=== Series 6 (2004) ===
No. overall	No. in series	Title	Original release date	UK viewers (millions)
27	1	"Clog Dancer to Backing Dancer"	5 September 2004	N/A
28	2	"History of Art Student to Graffiti Artist"	12 September 2004	N/A
29	3	"Factory Worker to Fashion Designer"	19 September 2004	N/A

=== Specials (2005–06) ===
No. overall	No. in series	Title	Original release date	UK viewers (millions)
30	–	"Physicist to Magician"	27 March 2005	1.79
31	–	"Cleaner to Burlesque Performer"	26 December 2006	1.36

=== Series 7 (2025) ===
No. overall	No. in series	Title	Original release date	UK viewers (millions)
32	1	"Estate Agent to Market Trader"	20 May 2025	N/A
33	2	"Fish Fryer to Sushi Chef"	27 May 2025	N/A
34	3	"Painter-Decorator to Make-Up Artist"	3 June 2025	N/A
