= Go Back to Where You Came From (British TV series) =

- Also known as: GBTWYCF
- Genre: Documentary
- Original language: English
- No. of episodes: 4

Production
- Production company: Minnow Films

Original release
- Network: Channel 4
- Release: 3 February 2025 – present

Go Back to Where You Came From is a British television documentary series broadcast on Channel 4 inspired by an Australian series with the same name.

== Background ==
The Australian series Go Back to Where You Came From was broadcast on SBS between 2011 and 2018.

== Episodes ==
No.	Title	Original release date
1	"Episode 1"	3 February 2025
Bushra, Chloe, and Dave travel to Syria. Jess, Mathilda, and Nathan travel to Somalia.
2	"Episode 2"	10 February 2025
3	"Episode 3"	17 February 2025
4	"Episode 4"	24 February 2025

== Reception ==
The Daily Telegraph's Anita Singh and The i Paper's Gerard Gilbert criticised the title of the series as clickbait.

=== Awards ===
Year	Award	Category	Result	Ref.
2026	British Academy Television Awards	Best Factual Entertainment	Won	

== See also ==
- Benefits Street
