= Martin D. Smith (footballer) =

Danish footballer (born 1978)

Personal information
- Full name: Martin Ditlev Smith
- Date of birth: 30 June 1978 (age 48)
- Place of birth: København, Denmark
- Height: 1.72 m (5 ft 8 in)
- Position: Defender

Youth career
- Brøndby IF

Senior career*
Years	Team	Apps	(Gls)
1998–2002	Brøndby IF	27	(0)

International career
1994–1997	Denmark U19	10	(1)
1997–1999	Denmark U21	16	(2)
- * Club domestic league appearances and goals

Martin Ditlev Smith (born 30 June 1978) is a Danish former professional footballer who played as a defender for Brøndby IF.

As a youth footballer in Brøndby IF, Smith won 10 caps for Denmark U19 and 16 for Denmark U21 between 1994 and 1999.

Smith made his Brøndby debut in the 1998–99 Superliga, playing eight games. The next year he played 17 Superliga games and participated in Brøndby's European campaign, scoring a goal against Boavista in the 1999–2000 UEFA Champions League qualifying rounds.

On 10 March 2000, Smith drove a car with his mother and father, younger brother and a friend as passengers. As two other cars had collided near Esbjerg, where the group was supposed to see a play, Smith failed to see that one of the cars had been plunged into his lane. In dark and rainy weather, he crashed into that car. Smith's mother was killed in the crash, and the two cars that crashed also hit a person who was pressed against the traffic barrier. Smith was injured by three broken ribs, a punctured lung and a lesion to the hip, severely halting his sporting career. He was also indicted in court for negligent bodily harm against the pedestrian, but was acquitted. He did receive a minor fine of 450 kr. for driving at too high velocity.

Smith initially tried to train himself back to being an elite footballer. He was able to start running again in February 2001. In addition, he had to cope with the mental trauma of losing his mother. Even though he returned during the 2002 winter break to play in friendly matches against Schalke 04 and Utrecht, and also featuring in two games of the 2001–02 Superliga in March 2002, his career could not continue at the highest domestic level and Smith chose to retire. Citing a lack of progress regarding his hip injury, "I guess it's time to think a bit more about my health. There is a life after football".

In 2006 his return to football was announced, starting a stint as player-manager of minor Rødovre club B 77. Outside of football, he took up a career as an electrician. He resided in Valby at the time.
