= Milan Ptáček =

Czech footballer (born 1970)

Personal information
- Date of birth: 27 January 1970 (age 56)
- Position: Defender

Senior career*
Years	Team	Apps	(Gls)
1988–1998	SK Hradec Králové		
- * Club domestic league appearances and goals

Milan Ptáček (born 27 January 1970) is a retired Czech football defender.
