= Tommy Andersson (footballer, born 1964) =

Swedish footballer (1964–2024)

Tommy "Hacke" Andersson
Personal information
- Date of birth: 30 January 1964
- Date of death: 16 November 2024 (aged 60)
- Position: Central defender

Senior career*
Years	Team	Apps	(Gls)
–1986	Tidaholm GoIF		
1987–1997	Halmstads BK		
- * Club domestic league appearances and goals

Tommy Andersson (30 January 1964 – 16 November 2024) was a Swedish footballer who played as a central defender. He died after suffering from a stroke, on 16 November 2024, at the age of 60.
