= Paata Machutadze =

Georgian footballer

Personal information
- Date of birth: 22 April 1968 (age 58)
- Place of birth: Batumi, Adjara ASSR, Georgian SSR, USSR
- Height: 1.74 m (5 ft 9 in)
- Position: Striker

Senior career*
Years	Team	Apps	(Gls)
1986–1990	Dinamo Batumi	87	(12)
1991	Mertskhali	8	(2)
1991–2003	Dinamo Batumi	250	(96)
- * Club domestic league appearances and goals

Paata Machutadze (Georgian: პაატა მაჭუტაძე; born 22 April 1968) is a former Georgian football striker.

Machutadze spent eighteen seasons at Dinamo Batumi where he won the Georgian Cup and Supercup. Individually, Machutadze was the five-time team topscorer in the mid-1990s. Being a member of the 100 club, he is the highest scoring player for a single team.

== Career ==
Machutadze started his career at Dinamo Batumi in 1986 in the 2nd division of Soviet football, making 63 appearances during the four seasons. He notched his first professional goal in a 2–1 home loss to Kuzbass on 17 October 1986.

After Georgia launched the Umaglesi Liga in 1990, Machutadze made his first appearance in a 1–0 win over Odishi on 22 April and, apart from a short-time tenure at Mertskhali, remained loyal to Dinamo up to the end of his career. In two successive seasons, Machutadze scored 19 goals each, becoming the team topscorer. In 1994–95, he finished 4th in the league goalscorers' race.

The 1995–96 season was special both for Machutadze and his club. As Dinamo Batumi made a debut in European football, Machutadze scored three times in four matches of their UEFA Cup Winners' Cup campaign, including Batumi's first goal in UEFA competitions against Yugoslav side Obilić.

In 1998, Machutadze won the first title of his career as his team secured an extra-time cup victory over Dinamo Tbilisi. Shortly, they beat the same opponents in the Super Cup competition, completing the season with two titles.

On 27 October 2001, on his 250th league game, Machutadze scored in a 3–0 win against WIT Georgia to become the 11th member of the 100 club of players with a hundred and more goals. On the final day of the 2002–03 regular season, Machutadze played against Locomotive before he announced retirement.

Machutadze racked up 106 goals in 282 Umaglesi Liga appearances for Dinamo Batumi. Overall, he played 345 league games in both Soviet and Georgian championships combined.

== Honours ==
Dinamo Batumi

- Umaglesi Liga runner-up: 1997–98
- Georgian Cup: 1997–98; runner-up: 1992–93, 1994–95, 1995–96, 1996–97
- Georgian Super Cup: 1998, runner-up: 1996, 1997
