= Aramayis Tonoyan =

Armenian footballer

Personal information
- Date of birth: 26 October 1969 (age 57)
- Place of birth: Yerevan
- Position: Defender

Senior career*
Years	Team	Apps	(Gls)
1988–1995	FC Ararat Yerevan		
1996–1997	FC Pyunik		
1997–1998	Sepahan FC		
1998–1999	FK Yerevan		
2001	FC Mika		

International career
1992–1997	Armenia	18	(0)

Managerial career
- 1999: FK Yerevan (player-manager)
- 2001: FC Mika (player-manager)
- * Club domestic league appearances and goals

Aramayis Tonoyan (born 26 October 1969) is a retired Armenian football defender.
