= Mihai Pârlog =

Romanian footballer

Personal information
- Date of birth: 9 March 1974 (age 52)
- Position: Midfielder

Senior career*
Years	Team	Apps	(Gls)
1995–1997	Petrolul Ploiești		
1997–1999	National București		
2000	Arges Pitești		
2000–2001	Juventus București		
2000–2001	Unirea Urziceni		
- * Club domestic league appearances and goals

Mihai Pârlog (born 9 March 1974) is a retired Romanian football midfielder.
