= Mihajlo Biberčić =

Serbian footballer

Personal information
- Date of birth: 23 September 1968 (age 58)
- Position: Forward

Senior career*
| Years | Team | Apps | (Gls) |
| 1986–1988 | Radnički Kragujevac | | |
| 1988–1989 | Borac Čačak | | |
| 1992–1993 | Priština | 19 | (2) |
| 1993–1994 | ÍA | 36 | (27) |
| 1995 | KR | 17 | (13) |
| 1996 | ÍA | 11 | (7) |
| 1997 | Breiðablik | 3 | (0) |
| 1997 | Stjarnan | 9 | (4) |
| 1998–1999 | ÍA | 1 | (0) |
| 2004 | Stjarnan | 1 | (0) |

International career
| 1985 | Yugoslavia U-16 | 3 | (1) |
- * Club domestic league appearances and goals

Mihajlo Biberčić (born 23 September 1968) is a Serbian retired footballer who played as a forward. He represented Yugoslavia U-16 in three games scoring once in 1985.
