= Jaroslav Vrábel =

Czech footballer (born 1971)

Personal information
- Date of birth: 17 September 1971 (age 55)
- Position: Defender

Senior career*
Years	Team	Apps	(Gls)
1994–1996	SK Hradec Králové		
1996–1997	Bohemians 1905		
1998–2005	SK Spolana Neratovice		
- * Club domestic league appearances and goals

Jaroslav Vrábel (born 17 September 1971) is a retired Czech football defender.
