= Tigran Gspeyan =

Armenian footballer

Personal information
- Date of birth: 12 October 1969 (age 57)
- Position: Defender

Senior career*
Years	Team	Apps	(Gls)
1988–1997	FC Ararat Yerevan		
1997	Erebuni-Homenmen FC		
1998	FC Tsement		
1999	Zvartnots-AAL FC		
2000	Dinamo-2000 Yerevan		
2000–2001	FC Ararat Yerevan		
2002	Dinamo-2000 Yerevan		
2002–2003	Ararat Tehran		
2003	Dinamo-2000 Yerevan		
2004	FC Shirak		
2005	Tadamon Sour SC		
2005	Yerevan United		

International career
1994–1998	Armenia	12	(0)
- * Club domestic league appearances and goals

Tigran Gspeyan (born 12 October 1969) is a retired Armenian football defender.
