= Faking It (British TV series) =

- Genre: Reality
- Created by: Stephen Lambert
- Narrated by: Michael Kitchen; Nicholas Rowe
- Country of origin: United Kingdom
- Original language: English
- No. of series: 7
- No. of episodes: 34 (list of episodes)

Production
- Running time: 60 minutes (inc. adverts)
- Production companies: RDF Television; Darlow Smithson Productions

Original release
- Network: Channel 4
- Release: 18 September 2000 – 26 December 2006
- Network: 5
- Release: 20 May – 3 June 2025

Faking It is a reality television show that aired on Channel 4 from 18 September 2000 to 26 December 2006. It was revived on 5 from 20 May to 3 June 2025.

Devised by Stephen Lambert, the programme's original concept was "a modern-day Pygmalion", referring to the George Bernard Shaw play in which flower girl Eliza Doolittle is trained to appear like an aristocrat.

== Format ==
The programme shared much with earlier British TV shows such as In at the Deep End and Jobs for the Boys/Girls, and the children's show Bring It On, all of which featured TV presenters or other celebrities learning other trades, but Faking It was the first that successfully used members of the public in the role. Its basic format was that a member of the public lived with and trained with an expert for four weeks and then took part in a contest against experienced participants in whatever activity they have learned. A panel of expert judges then gave their verdict on which participant was the "faker". Ostensibly, success meant fooling a majority of the judges, though there was no prize for success and the real point of the show was the experience that the fakers received over the course of the month's filming.

== Transmissions ==
Series	Episodes	Originally released		
Series	Episodes	First released	Last released	Network
1	2	18 September 2000	26 September 2000	Channel 4
2	3	17 April 2001	1 May 2001	Channel 4
3	4	6 November 2001	27 November 2001	Channel 4
4	11	26 September 2002	30 December 2002	Channel 4
5	6	3 February 2004	2 March 2004	Channel 4
6	3	5 September 2004	19 September 2004	Channel 4
Specials	2	27 March 2005	26 December 2006	Channel 4
7	3	20 May 2025	3 June 2025	5
