= Brøndby IF in European football =

- Club: Brøndby IF
- First entry: 1986–87 European Cup
- Latest entry: 2025–26 UEFA Conference League

This is the list of all Brøndby IF's European matches.

== Summary ==
=== By competition ===
Accurate as of 11 August 2022

| Competition | Played | Won | Drew | Lost | GF | GA | GD | Win% |
|---|---|---|---|---|---|---|---|---|
| UEFA Champions League | 44 | 15 | 8 | 21 | 56 | 67 | −11 | 34.09 |
| UEFA Cup Winners' Cup | 4 | 2 | 1 | 1 | 7 | 4 | +3 | 50.00 |
| UEFA Cup / UEFA Europa League | 131 | 57 | 28 | 46 | 204 | 159 | +45 | 43.51 |
| UEFA Europa Conference League | 4 | 2 | 1 | 1 | 7 | 3 | +4 | 50.00 |
| Total | 183 | 76 | 38 | 69 | 274 | 233 | +41 | 41.53 |

Source: UEFA.com
Pld = Matches played; W = Matches won; D = Matches drawn; L = Matches lost; GF = Goals for; GA = Goals against. Defunct competitions indicated in italics.

== Results ==
| Season | Competition | Round | Opponent | Home | Away | Aggregate |
|---|---|---|---|---|---|---|
| 1986–87 | European Cup | First round | (Hungary) Honvéd | 4–1 | 2–2 | 6–3 |
| 1986–87 | European Cup | Second round | (East Germany) Dynamo Berlin | 2–1 | 1–1 | 3–2 |
| 1986–87 | European Cup | Quarter-finals | (Portugal) Porto | 1–1 | 0–1 | 1–2 |
| 1987–88 | UEFA Cup | First round | (Sweden) IFK Göteborg | 2–1 | 0–0 | 2–1 |
| 1987–88 | UEFA Cup | Second round | (Romania) Sportul Studenţesc | 3–0 | 0–3 (a.e.t.) | 3–3 (0–3 p) |
| 1988–89 | European Cup | First round | (Belgium) Club Brugge | 2–1 | 0–1 | 2–2 (a) |
| 1989–90 | European Cup | First round | (France) Marseille | 1–1 | 0–3 | 1–4 |
| 1990–91 | UEFA Cup | First round | (Germany) Eintracht Frankfurt | 5–0 | 1–4 | 6–4 |
| 1990–91 | UEFA Cup | Second round | (Hungary) Ferencváros | 3–0 | 1–0 | 4–0 |
| 1990–91 | UEFA Cup | Third round | (Germany) Bayer Leverkusen | 3–0 | 0–0 | 3–0 |
| 1990–91 | UEFA Cup | Quarter-finals | (Soviet Union) Torpedo Moscow | 1–0 | 0–1 (a.e.t.) | 1–1 (4–2 p) |
| 1990–91 | UEFA Cup | Semi-finals | (Italy) Roma | 0–0 | 1–2 | 1–2 |
| 1991–92 | European Cup | First round | (Poland) Zagłębie Lubin | 3–0 | 1–2 | 4–2 |
| 1991–92 | European Cup | Second round | (Soviet Union) Dynamo Kyiv | 0–1 | 1–1 | 1–2 |
| 1993–94 | UEFA Cup | First round | (Scotland) Dundee United | 2–0 | 1–3 (a.e.t.) | 3–3 (a) |
| 1993–94 | UEFA Cup | Second round | (Finland) Kuusysi | 3–1 | 4–1 | 7–2 |
| 1993–94 | UEFA Cup | Third round | (Germany) Borussia Dortmund | 1–1 | 0–1 | 1–2 |
| 1994–95 | UEFA Cup Winners' Cup | First round | (Albania) Tirana | 3–0 | 1–0 | 4–0 |
| 1994–95 | UEFA Cup Winners' Cup | Second round | (England) Arsenal | 1–2 | 2–2 | 3–4 |
| 1995–96 | UEFA Cup | Preliminary round | (Lithuania) Inkaras Kaunas | 3–0 | 3–0 | 6–0 |
| 1995–96 | UEFA Cup | First round | (Norway) Lillestrøm | 3–0 | 0–0 | 3–0 |
| 1995–96 | UEFA Cup | Second round | (England) Liverpool | 0–0 | 1–0 | 1–0 |
| 1995–96 | UEFA Cup | Third Round | (Italy) Roma | 2–1 | 1–3 | 3–4 |
| 1996–97 | UEFA Champions League | Third qualifying round | (Poland) Widzew Łódź | 3–2 | 1–2 | 4–4 (a) |
| 1996–97 | UEFA Cup | First round | (Switzerland) Aarau | 5–0 | 2–0 | 7–0 |
| 1996–97 | UEFA Cup | Second round | (Scotland) Aberdeen | 0–0 | 2–0 | 2–0 |
| 1996–97 | UEFA Cup | Third round | (Germany) Karlsruher SC | 1–3 | 5–0 | 6–3 |
| 1996–97 | UEFA Cup | Quarter-finals | (Spain) Tenerife | 0–2 (a.e.t.) | 1–0 | 1–2 |
| 1997–98 | UEFA Champions League | Third qualifying round | (Ukraine) Dynamo Kyiv | 2–4 | 1–0 | 3–4 |
| 1997–98 | UEFA Cup | First round | (France) Lyon | 2–3 | 1–4 | 3–7 |
| 1998–99 | UEFA Champions League | Second qualifying round | (Slovakia) Košice | 0–1 | 2–0 | 2–1 |
| 1998–99 | UEFA Champions League | Group stage (Group D) | (Germany) Bayern Munich | 2–1 | 0–2 | 4th |
| 1998–99 | UEFA Champions League | Group stage (Group D) | (Spain) Barcelona | 0–2 | 0–2 | 4th |
| 1998–99 | UEFA Champions League | Group stage (Group D) | (England) Manchester United | 2–6 | 0–5 | 4th |
| 1999–2000 | UEFA Champions League | Second qualifying round | (North Macedonia) Sloga Jugomagnat | 1–0 | 1–0 | 2–0 |
| 1999–2000 | UEFA Champions League | Third qualifying round | (Portugal) Boavista | 1–2 | 2–4 (a.e.t.) | 3–6 |
| 1999–2000 | UEFA Cup | First round | (Poland) Amica Wronki | 4–3 | 0–2 | 4–5 |
| 2000–01 | UEFA Champions League | Second qualifying round | (Iceland) KR | 3–1 | 0–0 | 3–1 |
| 2000–01 | UEFA Champions League | Third qualifying round | (Germany) Hamburger SV | 0–2 | 0–0 | 0–2 |
| 2000–01 | UEFA Cup | First round | (Croatia) Osijek | 1–2 | 0–0 | 1–2 |
| 2001–02 | UEFA Cup | Qualifying round | (Republic of Ireland) Shelbourne | 2–0 | 3–0 | 5–0 |
| 2001–02 | UEFA Cup | First round | (Slovenia) Olimpija Ljubljana | 0–0 | 4–2 | 4–2 |
| 2001–02 | UEFA Cup | Second round | (Croatia) Varteks | 5–0 | 1–3 | 6–3 |
| 2001–02 | UEFA Cup | Third round | (Italy) Parma | 0–3 | 1–1 | 1–4 |
| 2002–03 | UEFA Champions League | Second qualifying round | (Albania) Dinamo Tirana | 1–0 | 4–0 | 5–0 |
| 2002–03 | UEFA Champions League | Third qualifying round | (Norway) Rosenborg | 2–3 | 0–1 | 2–4 |
| 2002–03 | UEFA Cup | First round | (Bulgaria) Levski Sofia | 1–1 | 1–4 | 2–5 |
| 2003–04 | UEFA Cup | Qualifying round | (Belarus) Dinamo Minsk | 3–0 | 2–0 | 5–0 |
| 2003–04 | UEFA Cup | First round | (Czech Republic) Viktoria Žižkov | 1–0 | 1–0 | 2–0 |
| 2003–04 | UEFA Cup | Second round | (Germany) Schalke 04 | 2–1 (a.e.t.) | 1–2 | 3–3 (3–1 p) |
| 2003–04 | UEFA Cup | Third round | (Spain) Barcelona | 0–1 | 1–2 | 1–3 |
| 2004–05 | UEFA Cup | Second qualifying round | (Latvia) Ventspils | 1–1 | 0–0 | 1–1 (a) |
| 2005–06 | UEFA Champions League | Second qualifying round | (Georgia (country)) Dinamo Tbilisi | 3–1 | 2–0 | 5–1 |
| 2005–06 | UEFA Champions League | Third qualifying round | (Netherlands) Ajax | 2–2 | 1–3 | 3–5 |
| 2005–06 | UEFA Cup | First round | (Switzerland) Zürich | 2–0 | 1–2 | 3–2 |
| 2005–06 | UEFA Cup | Group stage (Group B) | (Israel) Maccabi Petah Tikva | 2–0 | —N/a | 4th |
| 2005–06 | UEFA Cup | Group stage (Group B) | (Russia) Lokomotiv Moscow | —N/a | 2–4 | 4th |
| 2005–06 | UEFA Cup | Group stage (Group B) | (Spain) Espanyol | 1–1 | —N/a | 4th |
| 2005–06 | UEFA Cup | Group stage (Group B) | (Italy) Palermo | —N/a | 0–3 | 4th |
| 2006–07 | UEFA Cup | First qualifying round | (Iceland) Valur | 3–1 | 0–0 | 3–1 |
| 2006–07 | UEFA Cup | Second qualifying round | (Estonia) Flora Tallinn | 0–0 | 4–0 | 4–0 |
| 2006–07 | UEFA Cup | First round | (Germany) Eintracht Frankfurt | 2–2 | 0–4 | 2–6 |
| 2008–09 | UEFA Cup | First qualifying round | (Faroe Islands) B36 Tórshavn | 1–0 | 2–0 | 3–0 |
| 2008–09 | UEFA Cup | Second qualifying round | (Finland) Haka | 2–0 | 4–0 | 6–0 |
| 2008–09 | UEFA Cup | First round | (Norway) Rosenborg | 1–2 | 2–3 | 3–5 |
| 2009–10 | UEFA Europa League | Second qualifying round | (Estonia) Flora Tallinn | 0–1 | 4–1 | 4–2 |
| 2009–10 | UEFA Europa League | Third qualifying round | (Poland) Legia Warsaw | 1–1 | 2–2 | 3–3 (a) |
| 2009–10 | UEFA Europa League | Play-off round | (Germany) Hertha BSC | 2–1 | 1–3 | 3–4 |
| 2010–11 | UEFA Europa League | Second qualifying round | (Liechtenstein) Vaduz | 3–0 | 0–0 | 3–0 |
| 2010–11 | UEFA Europa League | Third qualifying round | (Montenegro) Budućnost Podgorica | 1–0 | 2–1 | 3–1 |
| 2010–11 | UEFA Europa League | Play-off round | (Portugal) Sporting CP | 0–3 | 2–0 | 2–3 |
| 2011–12 | UEFA Europa League | Third qualifying round | (Austria) SV Ried | 4–2 | 0–2 | 4–4 (a) |
| 2014–15 | UEFA Europa League | Third qualifying round | (Belgium) Club Brugge | 0–2 | 0–3 | 0–5 |
| 2015–16 | UEFA Europa League | First qualifying round | (San Marino) Juvenes/Dogana | 9–0 | 2–0 | 11–0 |
| 2015–16 | UEFA Europa League | Second qualifying round | (Bulgaria) Beroe Stara Zagora | 0–0 | 1–0 | 1–0 |
| 2015–16 | UEFA Europa League | Third qualifying round | (Cyprus) Omonia | 0–0 | 2–2 | 2–2 (a) |
| 2015–16 | UEFA Europa League | Play-off round | (Greece) PAOK | 1–1 | 0–5 | 1–6 |
| 2016–17 | UEFA Europa League | First qualifying round | (Iceland) Valur | 6–0 | 4–1 | 10–1 |
| 2016–17 | UEFA Europa League | Second qualifying round | (Scotland) Hibernian | 0–1 (a.e.t.) | 1–0 | 1–1 (5–3 p) |
| 2016–17 | UEFA Europa League | Third qualifying round | (Germany) Hertha BSC | 3–1 | 0–1 | 3–2 |
| 2016–17 | UEFA Europa League | Play-off round | (Greece) Panathinaikos | 1–1 | 0–3 | 1–4 |
| 2017–18 | UEFA Europa League | Second qualifying round | (Finland) VPS | 2–0 | 1–2 | 3–2 |
| 2017–18 | UEFA Europa League | Third qualifying round | (Croatia) Hajduk Split | 0–0 | 0–2 | 0–2 |
| 2018–19 | UEFA Europa League | Third qualifying round | (Serbia) Spartak Subotica | 2–1 | 2–0 | 4–1 |
| 2018–19 | UEFA Europa League | Play-off round | (Belgium) Genk | 2–5 | 2–4 | 4–9 |
| 2019–20 | UEFA Europa League | First qualifying round | (Finland) Inter Turku | 4–1 | 0–2 | 4–3 |
| 2019–20 | UEFA Europa League | Second qualifying round | (Poland) Lechia Gdańsk | 4–1 (a.e.t.) | 1–2 | 5–3 |
| 2019–20 | UEFA Europa League | Third qualifying round | (Portugal) Braga | 2–4 | 1–3 | 3–7 |
| 2021–22 | UEFA Champions League | Play-off round | (Austria) Red Bull Salzburg | 1–2 | 1–2 | 2–4 |
| 2021–22 | UEFA Europa League | Group stage (Group A) | (France) Lyon | 1–3 | 0–3 | 4th |
| 2021–22 | UEFA Europa League | Group stage (Group A) | (Scotland) Rangers | 1–1 | 0–2 | 4th |
| 2021–22 | UEFA Europa League | Group stage (Group A) | (Czech Republic) Sparta Prague | 0–0 | 0–2 | 4th |
| 2022–23 | UEFA Europa Conference League | Second qualifying round | (Poland) Pogoń Szczecin | 4–0 | 1–1 | 5–1 |
| 2022–23 | UEFA Europa Conference League | Third qualifying round | (Switzerland) Basel | 1–0 | 1–2 (a.e.t.) | 2–2 (1–3 p) |
| 2024–25 | UEFA Conference League | Second qualifying round | (Kosovo) Llapi | 6–0 | 2–2 | 8−2 |
| 2024–25 | UEFA Conference League | Third qualifying round | (Poland) Legia Warsaw | 2–3 | 1–1 | 3–4 |
| 2025–26 | UEFA Conference League | Second qualifying round | (Faroe Islands) HB | 1–0 | 1–1 | 2–1 |
| 2025–26 | UEFA Conference League | Third qualifying round | (Iceland) Víkingur Reykjavík | 4–0 | 0–3 | 4–3 |
| 2025–26 | UEFA Conference League | Play-off round | (France) Strasbourg | 2-3 | 0–0 | 2-3 |

== UEFA club coefficient ranking ==
=== Current ===
As of 5 january 2026

| Rank | Team | Points |
|---|---|---|
| 152 | (Estonia) FC Flora Tallinn | 10.000 |
| 153 | (France) Toulouse FC | 10.000 |
| 154 | (Denmark) Brøndby IF | 9.500 |
| 155 | (Northern Ireland) Linfield F.C. | 9.500 |
| 156 | FK Austria Wien | 9.500 |

=== Rankings since 2006 ===
As of 5 january 2026

| Season | Ranking | Movement | Points | Change |
|---|---|---|---|---|
| 2006–07 | 101 | ▲ +13 | 23.593 | ▲ +3.917 |
| 2007-08 | 117 | ▼ -16 | 19.129 | ▼ -4.464 |
| 2008–09 | 114 | ▲ +3 | 18.748 | ▼ -0.651 |
| 2009–10 | 139 | ▼ -25 | 10.890 | ▼ -7.588 |
| 2010–11 | 131 | ▲ +8 | 12.970 | ▲ +2.080 |
| 2011–12 | 157 | ▼ -26 | 10.110 | ▼ -2.860 |
| 2012–13 | 162 | ▼ -5 | 9.505 | ▼ -0.605 |
| 2013–14 | 159 | ▲ +3 | 9.140 | ▼ -0.365 |
| 2014–15 | 195 | ▼ -36 | 8.260 | ▼ -0.880 |
| 2015–16 | 210 | ▼ -15 | 7.460 | ▼ -0.800 |
| 2016–17 | 208 | ▲ +2 | 7.220 | ▼ -0.240 |
| 2017–18 | 173 | ▲ +35 | 8.800 | ▲ +1.58 |
| 2018–19 | 153 | ▲ +20 | 7.500 | ▼ -1.30 |
| 2019–20 | 138 | ▲ +15 | 8.500 | ▲ +1.00 |
| 2020–21 | 163 | ▼ -25 | 7.000 | ▼ -1.50 |
| 2021–22 | 150 | ▲ +13 | 7.500 | ▲ +0.50 |
| 2022-23 | 149 | ▲+1 | 9.500 | ▲+2.00 |
| 2023-24 | 204 | ▼-55 | 7.000 | ▼-2.50 |
| 2024-25 | 215 | ▼-11 | 7.000 | - |
| 2025-26 | 154 | ▲+61 | 9.500 | ▲+2.50 |
