= Svetlan Kondev =

Bulgarian footballer

Personal information
- Full name: Svetlan Atanasov Kondev
- Date of birth: 23 January 1976 (age 50)
- Place of birth: Sliven, Bulgaria
- Height: 1.70 m (5 ft 7 in)
- Position: Midfielder

Senior career*
Years	Team	Apps	(Gls)
1993–1997	Sliven	87	(34)
1997–1998	Maritsa Plovdiv	38	(14)
1999	Litex Lovech	14	(3)
2000–2001	Belasitsa Petrich	31	(6)
2001–2002	Lokomotiv Plovdiv	16	(4)
2002–2005	Belasitsa Petrich	81	(9)
2006–2007	Pietà Hotspurs	30	(6)
2008–2012	Montana	76	(10)
Total		373	(86)

International career
	Bulgaria U21	7	(0)

Managerial career
- 2012–2017: Montana (youth coach)
- 2017–2021: Montana (assistant)
- 2021: Montana
- 2021–2023: Montana (assistant)
- 2023: Montana (interim)
- 2023: Belasitsa Petrich (assistant)
- 2023–2024: Belasitsa Petrich
- 2024: Montana (assistant)
- 2024–2025: Etar (assistant)
- * Club domestic league appearances and goals

Svetlan Kondev (Bulgarian: Светлан Кондев; born 23 January 1976) is a former Bulgarian footballer. Kondev was capped 7 times for Bulgaria U21.

== Career ==
At a young age Kondev was playing at the squad of Sliven. In season 1997–98, at the age of 21, he made his debut in professional football with Maritsa Plovdiv. In the next year Kondev was part of the Litex Lovech squad, with which he played 3 matches and scored 1 goal (against Widzew Łódź) in the qualifying rounds of the UEFA Champions League.

In 2000, he signed with Belasitsa Petrich. In 2001 he moved to Plovdiv, signing with local club Lokomotiv, but one year later returned to Petrich. Until 2005 Kondev played three seasons in Belasitsa. He earned 81 appearances and scored 9 goals for the club.

In 2005, at the age of 29, he signed with Maltese Pietà Hotspurs. In 2008 Kondev returned in Bulgaria, signing a contract for two seasons with PFC Montana. With the club he became champion of Second West Division for the 2008–09 season.

In May 2023, Kondev was appointed as manager of Montana for the second time, in this case in an interim capacity, remaining in this position for three weeks.
