= Marty Smith (disambiguation) =

Marty Smith (1956–2020) was American motocross racer.

Marty Smith may also refer to:

- Marty Smith (reporter) (born 1976), American sports journalist
- Marty Smith (American football) (born 1953), American football player
