= Dušan Rupec =

Slovak footballer

Personal information
- Date of birth: 16 February 1968 (age 58)
- Position: Midfielder

Senior career*
Years	Team	Apps	(Gls)
1991	STK Senec		
1992	TJ Vítkovice		
1992–1997	Inter Bratislava		
1996	→ FC Petra Drnovice		
1997–1998	FC Tauris Rimavská Sobota		
1998–2000	ŠKP Devín		
2000	FC Tauris Rimavská Sobota		
2000–2001	ŠKP Devín		
2001–2003	TSV Pöllau		
- * Club domestic league appearances and goals

Dušan Rupec (born 16 February 1968) is a retired Slovak football midfielder.
