= Big Zuu =

English rapper, singer and songwriter (born 1995)

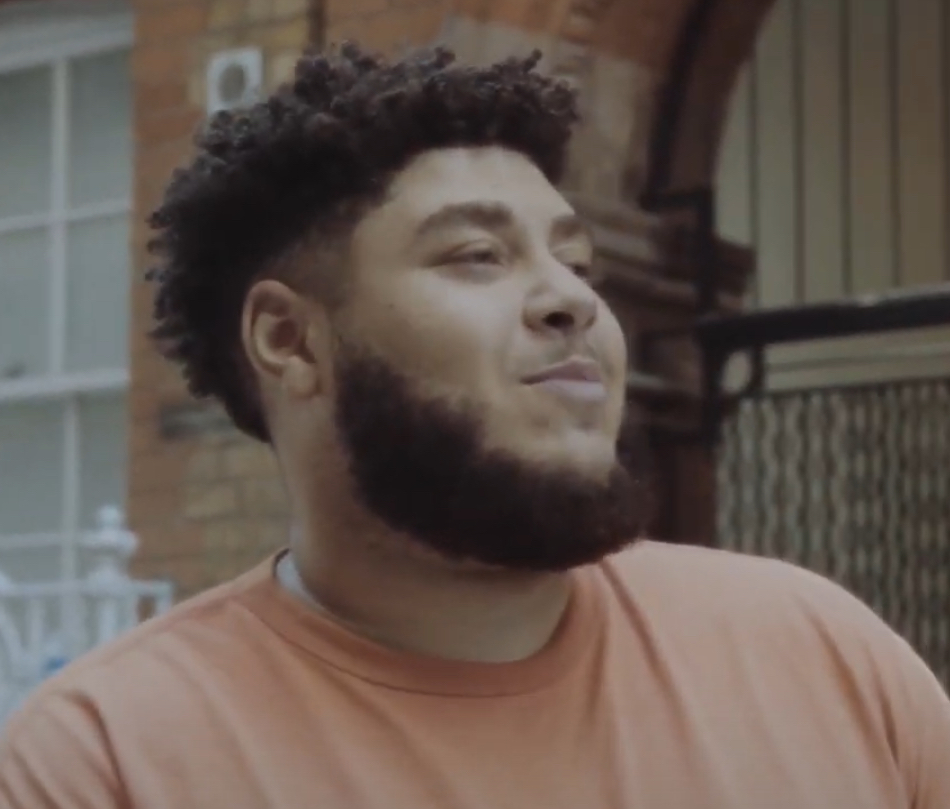
- Big Zuu in 2021

Background information
- Born: Zuhair Hassan; 19 August 1995 (age 31); London, England
- Origin: Kilburn, London, England
- Genres: Hip hop; grime
- Occupations: Rapper; singer; songwriter; DJ; television personality
- Years active: 2015–present
- Labels: Independent; Defenders Ent; DITTO
- Website: bigzuu.co.uk

Zuhair Hassan (born 19 August 1995), known professionally as Big Zuu, is an English rapper, singer, songwriter, DJ and television personality from West London. He is best known for presenting Big Zuu's Big Eats for U&Dave.

== Early and personal life ==
Hassan was born in London and grew up on the Mozart Estate in Harrow Road, which is located in West London. His mother is from Sierra Leone and his father is from Lebanon. During his gap year between college and university, Hassan worked as a mentor for young children in a secondary school in Haggerston, East London. He then spent two years at Goldsmiths University in New Cross studying towards a community development and youth work degree. He is a member of the MTP crew (My Team Paid), a rap group that consists of his cousin AJ Tracey and other grime MCs such as Ets and others; much like AJ Tracey, his first demos were recorded at their local youth centre, The Rugby Club, which let them use their studio so long as no expletives were used during the recording, forcing him to become creative to make his point.

In a 2018 interview with Red Bull, Hassan stated that his music style was influenced by "old school" artists such as Tupac Shakur, Jme, P Money, Ghetts and Skepta.

== Television career ==
In late 2019, UKTV channel Dave commissioned a new food show starring Hassan and various stand-up comedians. The show, Big Zuu's Big Eats, began broadcasting on 15 May 2020. It features Hassan and two friends, Tubsey and Hyder, in a 10-part series cooking for stand-up comedians who were touring the UK. For each comedian, they prepare a made-to-order pre-show appetizer, followed by a three-course meal. Rosie Jones, Desiree Burch, Ed Gamble, Jamali Maddix, Jimmy Carr, Josh Widdicombe, London Hughes, Lou Sanders, Phil Wang and Guz Khan make guest appearances in the series. In September 2020 it was confirmed that the show would return for two special episodes followed by a second series in 2021. The third series premiered on 4 July 2022; guests include Johnny Vegas, Katherine Ryan and Mel B.

He appeared on episode 11 of series 2 of Guessable. He made an appearance on Jon & Lucy's Christmas Sleepover.

Hassan presented Big Zuu's Breakfast Show on Sunday mornings throughout the spring and summer of 2022 on ITV.

In May 2022, Hassan won two Bafta TV Awards – entertainment performance and features for his show Big Zuu’s Big Eats at the 2022 British Academy Television Awards.

In 2024, Hassan presented Big Zuu Goes to Mecca, a documentary about his Umrah pilgrimage to Mecca. In the documentary, he debated with a friend whether Hassan can be considered Muslim due to his alcohol consumption.

In 2025 he appeared on Celebrity Bear Hunt on Netflix.

He scored the winning goal for World XI at Soccer Aid 2025.

In 2026, Hassan was a contestant on the Taskmaster New Year's Treat special. He made a guest appearance on the 20th season of The Apprentice, where candidates had to create a marketing campaign based on his canned water brand, DRIP.

== Discography ==
=== Studio albums ===
Title	Details	Peak chart positions		
Title	Details	UK	UK Ind.	SCO
Navigate	Released: 22/10/21; Label: Big Joint Ltd, eOne Music UK; Formats: CD, digital download	-	-	-

=== Singles ===
==== As featured artist ====
Title	Year	Peak chart positions			Album
Title	Year	UK	UK Ind.	SCO	Album
"Uncontrollable" (KSI featuring Big Zuu)	2018	89	11	85	Non-album single
"—" denotes a recording that did not chart or was not released in that territory.

== Filmography ==
=== Television ===
Year	Title	Role	Network	Notes	Ref.
2020–present	Big Zuu's Big Eats	Himself	Dave	4 series	
2020	Big Zuu's Christmas Eats	Himself	Dave	2 Christmas Specials	
2022	Big Zuu's Breakfast Show	Himself	ITV	8 episodes	
2022	Hungry for It	Co-presenter	BBC Three	8 episodes	
2022	Sneakerhead	Mulenga	Dave	Main cast	
2024–present	12 Dishes in 12 Hours	Presenter	ITV		
2024	Big Zuu Goes To Mecca	Presenter	BBC Two	Documentary	
2025	Celebrity Bear Hunt	Contestant/Winner	Netflix	Reality competition television series	
2025	Big Zuu & AJ Tracey’s Seriously Rich Flavours	Presenter	Sky Max	Three-part series	
2026	Taskmaster	Contestant	Channel 4	2 episodes ("New Year Treat 6")	

== Publications ==
- Big Zuu's Big Eats (ISBN 978-1785947292), 2021
