= Sergejus Novikovas =

Lithuanian footballer

Personal information
- Date of birth: 5 May 1972 (age 54)
- Height: 1.82 m (6 ft 0 in)
- Position: Defender

Senior career*
Years	Team	Apps	(Gls)
1991–2004	FK Žalgiris		

International career
1996–1999	Lithuania	6	(0)
- * Club domestic league appearances and goals

Sergejus Novikovas (born 5 May 1972) is a retired Lithuanian football defender.
