= Martyn Smith (producer) =

British television producer

Martyn Smith is a British television producer noted for creating the original UK series of the hit BBC series Dragons' Den based on the original Japanese format.

== Dragon's den ==
Smith produced and directed a pilot for the British version of Dragon's Den for the BBC after the corporation took an option on the format which was created by Nippon TV in Japan. In Japan, the show was a cult late-night series where young businessmen and women would ask for money from five rich individuals. However, the 'Dragons' in Japan usually handed over money as a gift and rarely took an equity position in the companies of those asking for money. The Japanese show was created when Nippon TV asked in-house producers to come up with low-budget ideas. The clever twist of asking the 'Dragons' to invest their own money in fledgling businesses kept costs low. The series was filmed in an office at Nippon TV headquarters for the same reason.

The UK pilot and first series were filmed at a warehouse space in North London. The original 'Dragons' were Duncan Bannatyne, Doug Richard, Peter Jones, Rachel Elnaugh and Simon Woodroffe. Initially, a one-hour pilot was made which was commissioned by BBC2 as a six-part series. Smith was credited as 'Series Editor' on the original series and also directed the series.

== Awards ==
Smith won a Royal Television Society award as Series Producer on the second series of The Apprentice in 2007 and was nominated for a BAFTA for the same series in 2007. He series produced the second series of Mary, Queen of Shops which was nominated for an RTS Award in 2009.
