= Nexhmedin Memedi =

Macedonian footballer

Personal information
- Full name: Nexhmedin Memedi; Неџмедин Мемеди
- Date of birth: 20 March 1966 (age 60)
- Place of birth: Skopje, SFR Yugoslavia
- Position: Midfielder

Senior career*
Years	Team	Apps	(Gls)
1993–1995	Sloga Jugomagnat		
1995–1997	Sileks		
1997–2000	Sloga Jugomagnat	36	(1)
2000–2001	Vardar		

International career^{‡}
1993–2000	Macedonia	32	(2)
- * Club domestic league appearances and goals as of 31 August 2009 ‡ National team caps and goals as of 31 August 2009

Nedžmedin Memedi (Macedonian: Неџмедин Мемеди, Albanian: Nexhmedin Memedi) (born 20 March 1966) is a retired Macedoniаn football midfielder from Macedonia.

== International career ==
He made his senior debut for Macedonia in an October 1993 friendly match away against Slovenia, which was his country's first ever official match, and got 32 caps and 2 goals in total. His final international was a July 2000 friendly against Azerbaijan.
