= 2025 in British television =

This is a list of events that took place in 2025 relating to television in the United Kingdom.

== Events ==
=== January ===
Date	Event
1	BBC One sees in the New Year with Sophie Ellis-Bextor, who performs and hosts a "New Year Disco".
1	Ross Kemp will reprise his role as EastEnders character Grant Mitchell to coincide with the programme's 40th anniversary.
1	Details of the most-watched television events of the decade so far are released. In first place is Boris Johnson's 23 March 2020 Downing Street address at the start of the COVID-19 pandemic, watched by 28.3 million viewers. This is followed by an address given by Johnson on 10 May 2020, watched by 27.6 million. In third place is the state funeral of Elizabeth II on 19 September 2022 (26.5 million), followed by Elizabeth II's COVID-19 address on 5 April 2020 (24.5 million), and the UEFA Euro 2020 final on 11 July 2021 (22.5 million).
1	Joel Dommett and Ellie Taylor are crowned the winners of the Gladiators Celebrity Special after beating Rob Beckett and Louise Minchin.
1	All WWE wrestling programmes move to Netflix after many years on linear TV channels including TNT Sports, with the WWE Network closing down at the same time.
2	A new Gavin & Stacey clip showing scenes from a long-discussed fishing trip that was a running joke throughout the series is released.
6	Barb-produced figures give the Christmas Day episode of Gavin and Stacey an audience of 19.11 million in the first week following its transmission.
6	After 20 years on Channel 4, the broadcaster moves its traditional weeknight showing of The Simpsons to E4.
6	Debut of BBC Scotland's new weeknight news bulletin, Reporting Scotland: News at Seven, presented by Laura Maciver and Amy Irons.
10	Royal Mail launches a set of special stamps to celebrate award-winning sitcom The Vicar of Dibley.
11	An advert for Endrick Clothing filmed on the wedding day of reality TV stars Vicky Pattison and Ercan Ramadan, and that shows the groom and groomsmen smoking cigars, is banned by the Advertising Standards Agency for glamorising smoking.
13	It is announced that London Live will close down on 19 January at midnight.
15	The BBC News Channel stops simulcasting BBC Breakfast during the week, instead airing the global news service which, at that time of day, broadcasts rolling news and business reports. Breakfast will continue to air on the BBC News Channel at the weekend, unless there is breaking news at weekends when it sticks with the international feed.
15	It is announced that Kelly Cates, Mark Chapman and Gabby Logan will replace Gary Lineker as presenters of Match of the Day from the beginning of the next football season.
15	Cyclone (Lystus Ebosel) and Hammer (Tom Wilson) are announced as two new Gladiators ahead of the second series on BBC One.
16	ITV announces the cancellation of Bath-set crime drama McDonald & Dodds after four series due to a drop in ratings.
17	Culture Secretary Lisa Nandy announces that the BBC would not be funded from general taxation if the TV licence fee were to be abolished.
19	London Live closes down following the sale of the channel to David Montgomery's Local TV Ltd.
20	London TV, a London version of the Local TV Network, which airs True Crime for most of the day, replaces London Live as London's local television station.
24	Jake Brown and Leanne Quigley win the third series of The Traitors. Overnight viewing figures indicate the episode had an audience of 7.4 million viewers, giving the programme its highest viewing figures to date.
26	Comedian Josh Jones is forced to withdraw from Dancing on Ice due to an injury sustained while training.
27	Sir Lindsay Hoyle, the Speaker of the House of Commons, makes a cameo appearance in an episode of Emmerdale.
30	Sally Magnusson announces she will stand down as presenter of the BBC's Reporting Scotland in April, but will continue to work for the BBC on a freelance basis.
30	Natalie Cassidy announces her departure from EastEnders, with her character Sonia Fowler set to leave during the show's 40th anniversary.

=== February ===
Date	Event
5	Newscaster Kay Burley announces, during her breakfast show, she is leaving Sky News with immediate effect after 36 years with the channel.
6	An ITV News investigation uncovers a number of allegations relating to inappropriate and intimidating behaviour by celebrity chef Gino D'Acampo.
7	ITV removes Gino D'Acampo's upcoming shows from its schedule after he was accused of inappropriate and intimidating behaviour on set as well as pulling repeats of the most recent series of Family Fortunes.
12	Ofcom says it is "carefully assessing" 1,227 complaints relating to comments made by Josh Howie on an edition of GB News's Headliners on 22 January concerning the LGBT community.
15	Netflix are forced to move their BAFTA Awards afterparty, scheduled to be held at the Chiltern Firehouse the following day, to a different venue after a fire at the hotel.
15	Kay Wright is appointed Head of BBC Midlands, overseeing radio, television and online content in the East and West Midlands areas.
18	Steven Knight, creator of Peaky Blinders, tells BBC Breakfast the franchise will continue beyond the upcoming film.
19	EastEnders celebrates its 40th anniversary. The celebrations include two viewer votes to decide the outcome of storylines, a first for a British soap opera.
20	Culture Secretary Lisa Nandy says she will raise concerns with BBC bosses over the documentary Gaza: How to Survive a Warzone, narrated by a 13-year-old boy who is the son of Hamas's deputy minister of agriculture. Hamas is a prescribed terrorist group in the UK, Israel and many other countries. The film is subsequently removed from BBC iPlayer.
20	As part of their 40th anniversary week celebrations, EastEnders airs a live episode, during which the character Martin Fowler (James Bye) is killed-off. Overnight viewing figures indicate the episode was watched by an average 3.7 million viewers.
20	Barbara Broccoli and Michael G. Wilson announce they are stepping down from control of the James Bond franchise, with creative control going to Amazon MGM Studios.
21	Amazon MGM Studios announces that Australian soap Neighbours will finish at the end of 2025, the second time the series has been cancelled, and two years after Amazon relaunched it.
22	The BBC announces the return of Vicki Fowler to EastEnders after 21 years, with the role recast to Alice Haig.
25	Actor Alexander Westwood, who appeared in the Netflix series Sex Education, is sentenced to fifteen and a half years in prison after he was convicted of 26 crimes against children and two pupils who went to him for acting tuition.
27	To promote the release of new episodes of Peppa Pig, Mummy Pig appears on Good Morning Britain to announce her third pregnancy.
27	Charlotte Moore announces her departure as BBC Chief Content Officer; she will leave the post later in the year.
28	Eurosport closes in the UK and Ireland after 36 years when TNT Sports incorporates the coverage previously shown on Eurosport. This includes the Olympic Games, cycling (including the Tour de France), snooker, tennis (including three of the four majors) and winter sports.
28	The High Court rules that Ofcom acted unlawfully with rulings over two shows hosted by Jacob Rees-Mogg on GB News in 2023, which it said breached the broadcasting code on impartiality grounds. It is the first time Ofcom has lost such a case.
28	Philip Foster, an actor who appeared in Channel 4 soap Brookside, is sentenced to eight and a half years in prison at Sheffield Crown Court over a £13.6m fraud involving fake model agencies.

=== March ===
Date	Event
1	ITV airs the 2025 Brit Awards. In the days following the ceremony, media regulator Ofcom received 825 complaints, the majority of them about Sabrina Carpenter's pre-watershed opening performance and Charli XCX's outfit.
3	BBC Two airs the 500th edition of the quiz show Only Connect.
3	Almost four years after leaving the programme, Piers Morgan returns to Good Morning Britain as a guest to discuss a recent conversation with US President Donald Trump.
7	All-female country trio Remember Monday are chosen to represent the UK at the 2025 Eurovision Song Contest with their song "What the Hell Just Happened?".
7	Businesswoman Sara Davies announces she is to step away from her role on BBC One's Dragons' Den later in 2025.
9	Sam Aston and professional dance partner Molly Lanaghan win series 17 of Dancing on Ice. It is also the final series of Dancing on Ice prior to the cancellation announcement 17 days later.
11	Emmerdale announce that they have dropped freelance screenwriter Martin Fustes, who had been writing for the soap for eleven years, since Fustes had earlier that week admitted assault causing actual bodily harm and intentional suffocation. They also withdraw their submission for the 2025 British Academy Television Awards, an episode written by Fustes that featured the fictional court trial of Tom King (James Chase), a character who had been subjecting his wife to physical and emotional abuse and coercive control.
12	Channel 5 rebrands its television channel and online streaming service as 5, the third time the channel has undergone a rebrand since its launch in 1997.
13	Bargain Hunt celebrates its 25th anniversary.
14	BBC News presenters Martine Croxall, Annita McVeigh, Karin Giannone and Kasia Madera settle with the channel over sex and age discrimination relating to the merger of its domestic and international news channels in 2023. Since which three have regained their roles as main presenters with McVeigh becoming a chief presenter.
14	The BBC and ITV agree a new four-year deal to air the Six Nations Championship keeping it on free-to-air television until 2029. Under the deal, which begins in 2026, ITV will show ten matches, including all England games, while the BBC will air at least five games involving Scotland and Wales. The BBC will also have exclusive rights to the Women's Six Nations Championship and the Under-20 Six Nations Championship.
14	Ofcom removes three breaches of broadcasting code conditions against GB News following the High Court ruling in the channel's favour at the end of February.
17	Ofcom drops its remaining impartiality investigations against GB News following the High Court's ruling in the channel's favour.
18	BBC Scotland announces its flagship soap, River City, will end in Autumn 2026 after 24 years on air.
19	Amanda Mealing pleads guilty to driving while under the influence of drugs, having tested positive for cocaine and benzoylecgonine in a roadside test. She also pleads guilty to driving without due care and attention. Mealing is banned from driving for 22 months, fined £485 and ordered to pay £400 in court costs and a surcharge of £194.
20	Jo Coburn announces her departure from the BBC and as host of the programme BBC Politics Live.
20	Alan Sugar signs a new three-year contract with the BBC, extending his tenure as presenter of The Apprentice until 2029.
21	Four of the UK's biggest sports broadcasters and production companies – the BBC, BT, IMG and ITV – are fined more than £4m for illegally colluding on freelance pay rates.
21	BBC One airs the Red Nose Day 2025 telethon, with £34m raised by the end of the evening.
21	Blue Peter is broadcast live on the CBBC channel for the final time. Going forward, episodes will be pre-recorded and made available on BBC iPlayer first before being shown on CBBC later in the day.
22	Cutbacks at BBC News results in the ending of technology magazine programme Click, after almost exactly 25 years on air. It is replaced the following week by a new technology programme called Tech Now.
24	Netflix drama Adolescence becomes the first streaming show to top the UK's weekly TV ratings, with 6.45 million people watching its first episode.
26	Interview programme HARDtalk ends after 28 years. As with the ending of Click, the programme is being axed as part of the latest cuts and the slots previously occupied by HARDtalk will be replaced by rolling news. HARDtalk had aired several times each day and one, 10.30 am, had seen a UK opt-out for UK‑specific news. This opt-out ends and is replaced by the global news feed.
26	ITV announces the cancellation of Dancing on Ice for a second time due to poor viewing figures. It had first launched in 2006 and ran until 2014, before being revived in its current format in 2018.
31	Netflix announces it is to make its drama Adolescence available free to screen in schools.

=== April ===
Date	Event
1	The cost of an annual TV licence increases by £5 to £174.50.
7	Warp Films, makers of Adolescence, announces plans to make a series based on the 1980s nuclear war film Threads.
9	The BBC unveils the restored statue of Prospero and Ariel, created by sculptor Eric Gill, outside its London headquarters.
12	Amanda Wah and Joe Fishburn win Series 2 of the Gladiators reboot.
12	Mickey Rourke leaves Series 24 of Celebrity Big Brother after using language and behaviour deemed to be threatening and violent towards JoJo Siwa, becoming the first housemate to be removed from the house in the ITV version of Big Brother.
13	Sky announces plans to launch a UK version of the US entertainment programme Saturday Night Live in 2026.
16	ITV announces that ITVBe is to be replaced by ITV Quiz from 9 June 2025, with some of its shows, including The Only Way Is Essex, moving to ITV2.
16	Former broadcast journalist and Labour politician Delyth Evans is appointed chair of S4C.
17	Air conditioning boss Dean Franklin wins Series 19 of The Apprentice, and secures a £250,000 investment from Lord Sugar.
22	Following reports that his company has been operating without the correct licence, Apprentice winner Dean Franklin says he is "not aware of any ongoing investigation".
24	The Independent Office for Police Conduct complains to Ofcom about an episode of Panorama concerning the shooting of Chris Kaba.
24	Actors starring in the Scottish soap opera River City stage a protest against its cancellation outside the Scottish Parliament.
25	Culture Secretary Lisa Nandy says the BBC's licence fee is "unenforceable" and that "no options are off the table" when the UK government begins a review into the BBC's financing model.
25	Jack P. Shepherd wins the twenty-fourth series of Celebrity Big Brother.
26	BBC One, BBC iPlayer, BBC News and Sky News provide coverage of the funeral of Pope Francis.
30	Laura Goodwin is named as the new lead presenter of BBC Reporting Scotland.

=== May ===
Date	Event
5	Anna Haugh's Big Irish Food Tour makes its debut on BBC Two.
6	The BBC announce plans for a Call the Midwife film set in an overseas location in 1972, as well as a prequel that will be set during World War II.
8	Oghenochuko Ojiri, who appeared as an art expert on Bargain Hunt, has been charged with terror offences, the Metropolitan Police announces.
9	The original 1983 lost pilot episode of Thomas & Friends, narrated by Ringo Starr, has been recovered, restored and released to commemorate the 80th anniversary of The Railway Series books by Rev. W. Awdry.
9	Oghenochuko Ojiri pleads guilty to failing to report a series of art sales to a man suspected of financing Hezbollah.
12	The University of Warwick defeats Christ's College, Cambridge to win the 2024‍–‍25 series of University Challenge.
13	Gary Lineker deletes a social media post he shared from the group Palestine Lobby which includes a picture of a rat and makes reference to "Zionism" following criticism. Lineker subsequently apologises for sharing the post.
16	Ncuti Gatwa withdraws from reading out the UK's Eurovision results due to "unforeseen circumstances" and is replaced by Sophie Ellis-Bextor.
17	Graham Norton stars in "The Interstellar Song Contest", an episode of Doctor Who which airs ahead of the 2025 Eurovision Song Contest.
17	JJ wins the 2025 Eurovision Song Contest for Austria with the song "Wasted Love", while the UK entry, "What the Hell Just Happened?" by Remember Monday, finishes in 19th place.
19	Following controversy over a social media post, it is confirmed that Gary Lineker will leave the BBC following his last edition of Match of the Day on 25 May, and will no longer present FA Cup coverage for the BBC during the 2025–26 season, or coverage of the 2026 FIFA World Cup.
19	John Robinson, a teacher from Sutton Coldfield, wins the 2024–25 series of Mastermind.
20	ITV announces that Lorraine's runtime will be reduced from 60 to 30 minutes from January 2026 as part of job cuts to its daily schedule. Good Morning Britain will be extended by half an hour to fill the airtime, running from 6 am to 9.30 am. Lorraine will also only air for 30 of the 52 weeks each year, with Good Morning Britain broadcast until 10 am whenever Lorraine is not showing.
25	Gary Lineker presents Match of the Day for the final time, having hosted the show since 1999.
26	Former Doctors, Bugs and Casualty actress Jaye Griffiths is announced to be joining the cast of Emmerdale.
27	Dominic McLaughlin, Arabella Stanton and Alastair Stout have been cast as Harry Potter, Hermione Granger and Ron Weasley for a forthcoming television adaptation of the Harry Potter novel series being produced by HBO.
29	Loose Women panellist Nadia Sawalha has described ITV's announcement of cuts to its daytime schedule as having come "out of the blue" and says they have been "absolutely brutal" for those working on the show.
30	Gerry Adams, leader of Sinn Féin from 1983 until 2018, is awarded €100,000 in a libel case in Dublin against the BBC.
31	Ncuti Gatwa departs Doctor Who after the conclusion of his second season, with the end of his final episode, "The Reality War", showing the Fifteenth Doctor regenerating into what is believed to be the Sixteenth Doctor, portrayed by Billie Piper.
31	Harry Moulding, a magician from Blackpool, wins the eighteenth series of Britain's Got Talent.
31	It is reported that Michelle Ryan will reprise her role of Zoe Slater in the BBC soap opera EastEnders after 20 years, despite repeatedly turning down previous offers to return.

=== June ===
Date	Event
3	In an email to staff, Adam Smyth, the director of BBC Northern Ireland, says the BBC has "no intention" of blocking its news or other output in the Republic of Ireland.
5	The British Soap Awards returns to ITV for the first time in two years for its 2025 ceremony. EastEnders dominates the categories with eight wins, including Best British Soap, while Lacey Turner wins the award for Best Leading Performer. EastEnders also wins the other publicly voted awards and four panel-voted awards. Hollyoaks wins three awards, Emmerdale wins two, while David Neilson of Coronation Street wins the Outstanding Achievement Award.
6	Former Bargain Hunt art expert Oghenochuko Ojiri is sentenced to two years and six months in prison for failing to declare art he sold to a suspected Hezbollah financier.
6	Sue Cleaver makes her final onscreen appearance as Eileen Grimshaw in Coronation Street after 25 years.
7	EastEnders has suspended actor Jamie Borthwick (who plays the character Jay Brown) after a backstage video from a November 2024 edition of Strictly Come Dancing surfaced showing him referring to the inhabitants of Blackpool by using language considered derogatory toward disabled individuals.
9	It is announced that the 2026 Brit Awards will be held at Manchester's Co-op Live arena, the first time the ceremony has been held outside London.
9	Love Island returns for its twelfth series on ITV2.
9	GB News launches new late night programming, with Patrick Christys Tonight: Late Edition on Mondays to Thursdays and Ben Leo Tonight: Late Edition from Fridays to Sundays.
11	Mother and son Caroline and Tom Bridge win series five of Race Across the World.
13	Among those from the world of television to be recognised in the 2025 Birthday Honours are Claudia Winkleman and Tess Daly who receive MBEs.
16	Following reports the previous month, Michelle Ryan's return to EastEnders as Zoe Slater airs on BBC One. The episode also marks the first of newly appointed executive producer Ben Wadey's to be transmitted. Overnight viewing figures give the episode an audience of 2.2 million.
19	Richard Frediani, the editor of BBC Breakfast, announces he is taking an extended leave following allegations of bullying.
20	The BBC decides to shelve the documentary, Gaza: Doctors Under Attack, over concerns regarding impartiality. The documentary was commissioned by the BBC, and scheduled for broadcast in February, but has not been aired by the BBC. Ultimately, Channel 4 would acquire the rights to broadcast the documentary on 2 July.
21	EastEnders announces the return of Oscar Branning after eight years, with the role recast to newcomer Pierre Moullier.
23	Television presenter Dermot Murnaghan reveals that he has been diagnosed with stage four prostate cancer.
26	The BBC confirms that it will not be broadcasting Neil Young's Glastonbury 2025 set at the request of the artist after he previously stated the festival was a "corporate turn-off" because of the BBC's involvement. This decision is later reversed.
28	Neil Young is the Saturday night headline act on the Pyramid Stage, with the concert broadcast on BBC Two, while Charli XCX headlines on The Other Stage. Her gig, broadcast on BBC One, draws the larger audience.
28	Rap duo Bob Vylan play the West Holts stage at Glastonbury, and lead the crowd in chants calling for death to the Israeli Defence Force. The BBC says footage of the gig will not be made available on BBC iPlayer, while festival organisers say they are "appalled" by the incident. Avon and Somerset Police say they will retrieve footage of the performance to see if an offence has been committed.
30	The BBC issues a statement in which it says it should have cut away from the livestream of Bob Vylan's concert following their anti-IDF chant. The statement comes after Ofcom said the BBC "clearly has questions to answer" over its coverage, and the UK government questioned why the comments were aired live.
30	GB News announces the launch of a nightly show from Washington, D.C. from September, providing coverage of US news stories and presented by Bev Turner.

=== July ===
Date	Event
2	Alongside the BBC, ITV covers the finals of football's UEFA Women's Championship for the first time starting with the 2025 edition in Switzerland.
3	The partner of Ashling Murphy, who was murdered in the Republic of Ireland while jogging along a canal bank in January 2022, reaches a settlement with BBC Northern Ireland over a defamation case concerning a November 2023 edition of The View which discussed his victim impact statement.
8	The BBC dismisses Gregg Wallace as presenter of MasterChef after a further 50 complaints emerged concerning his behaviour.
10	Gregg Wallace faces criticism from disability charities after he appeared to link his alleged misconduct to his diagnosis of autism.
13	Dame Melanie Dawes, the chief executive of Ofcom, says the BBC needs to "get a grip quicker" and complete reports and investigations sooner following controversies such as Bob Vylan's Glastonbury appearance.
14	An independent investigation upholds 45 allegations against Gregg Wallace, mostly involving inappropriate language, but including one of unwelcome physical contact and three of being in a state of undress. A total of 83 allegations were made against the former MasterChef presenter.
14	A review of the BBC documentary Gaza: How to Survive a Warzone concludes that it breached editorial guidelines on accuracy by failing to disclose the narrator was the son of a Hamas official.
14	The University for the Creative Arts awards Rose Ayling-Ellis an honorary doctorate for her contribution to acting and campaigning for the deaf community.
14	Production begins on the Harry Potter TV series at Warner Bros. Studios Leavesden.
15	John Torode is dismissed from MasterChef after a complaint he used "an extremely offensive racist term" was upheld.
17	It is announced that Scottish comedy Two Doors Down will return for a 2025 Christmas special.
18	Big Brother celebrates its 25th anniversary.
21	Comedian Fred MacAulay reveals he has been diagnosed with prostate cancer.
23	The BBC confirms that a series of MasterChef recorded in 2024, before Gregg Wallace and John Torode were sacked from the programme, will be aired on BBC One and BBC iPlayer.
23	Channel 4 have expressed concern that noise from a new pub adjacent to their premises in Leeds would disrupt news broadcasts.
27	It is announced that professional dancers Alexis Warr and Julian Caillon will join Strictly Come Dancing when it returns in the autumn.
27	The BBC and ITV agree a deal to broadcast the 2027 FIFA Women's World Cup in the UK. Under the terms of the deal, the two broadcasters will split live coverage of the matches equally between them, along with joint live coverage of the final.
27	The UEFA Women's Euro 2025 football tournament concludes with England winning their second successive European title, defeating Spain in the final on a penalty shootout. The match attracts a peak audience of 16.4 million viewers across both BBC and ITV, making it the most watched television programme of the year so far.
28	Sam Thompson, Joe Wicks, Vogue Williams and Nicola Adams will be taking part in the celebrity special of Gladiators.
30	The BBC announces a renewal of its partnership with the Met Office for weather and climate change forecasts, eight years after ending their association.

=== August ===
Date	Event
1	The Broadcasting, Entertainment, Communications and Theatre Union (BECTU) urges the BBC to reconsider its decision to air a series of MasterChef recorded before Gregg Wallace and John Torode were sacked from the programme.
1	Figures released by official ratings agency Barb showed that GB News overtook both the BBC News channel and Sky News for the month of July for the first time, with an average audience of 80,600 across each day.
1	Another UK-specific programme on the BBC News Channel, Sportsday, ends with the focus shifting to breaking sports news 'digitally' – i.e., online. Consequently, the only News Channel-exclusive UK-orientated sports news bulletin airs on weekdays at 13.30.
6	MasterChef returns to BBC One. Overnight viewing figures indicate the opening episode was watched by 1.96m viewers, a fall compared to 2.73m for the opening episode of the 2024 series, although the 2025 series is airing later in the year than its predecessor.
6	The Liberal Democrats call for adverts on YouTube to be regulated in the same way as those on television to prevent people falling victims to scams, promotion of diet pills and fake celebrity endorsements.
8	The BBC confirms that there will not be a second series of This Town.
8	ITV announces that Gary Lineker will present a new game show titled The Box.
11	ITV airs Nicola Sturgeon: The Interview ahead of the publication of her autobiography.
13	It is announced that model and actress Ellie Goldstein will join the 2025 series of Strictly Come Dancing, making her the first person with Down's syndrome to compete in the series.
14	A second contestant is edited out of the 2025 series of MasterChef after requesting footage of them not be shown. It follows an earlier request from another contestant, Sarah Shafi, who asked to be removed following the BBC's decision to air the series.
17	The BBC asks police to investigate allegations published by The Sun on Sunday that two Strictly Come Dancing stars used cocaine on the show during the 2024 series.
18	The BBC pulls the documentary Ozzy Osbourne: Coming Home from its schedule hours before it was due to air. It is replaced with an episode of Fake or Fortune?. The broadcaster subsequently confirms that it made the decision to pull the programme out of respect for the Osbourne family's wishes, who felt it was too soon to air the documentary.
18	Ofcom announces that it will not investigate the most recent series of Love Island following 14,154 complaints about issues including bullying and concerns for contestants' mental health.
19	Gary Lineker is nominated for best TV presenter at the forthcoming 30th National Television Awards.
20	James Harding, the BBC's former director of news, says the broadcaster should be protected from "political interference" following comments by Culture Secretary Lisa Nandy earlier in the year, when she appeared to call for the resignation of director-general Tim Davie.
21	Kristian Nairn pulls out of the Strictly Come Dancing line up of contestants on medical grounds.
22	A star of Strictly Come Dancing is arrested by the Metropolitan Police on suspicion of rape and "non-consensual intimate image abuse", before being released the next day.
25	Michaella McCollum, Lucy Spraggan and Troy Deeney complete the 2025 series of Celebrity SAS: Who Dares Wins.
27	Former teacher Tim McCarthy is shown helping to win his team £100,000 on ITV's The Chase, with the episode airing a month after he died following a long illness.
29	A BBC Proms performance by the Melbourne Symphony Orchestra is interrupted by pro-Palestinian protesters, requiring the concert to be paused for ten minutes. Jewish Artists for Palestine later claims responsibility.
30	Olivia Utley joins Charlie Peters to co-present Saturday Morning Live on GB News.

=== September ===
Date	Event
5	Actor John Alford, who appeared in London's Burning and Grange Hill, is found guilty of sexually assaulting two girls aged 14 and 15. He is told to expect a jail sentence in December.
6	A fire breaks out at Television Centre, London, the former headquarters of the BBC.
6	The BBC confirms that chef and television presenter Matt Tebbutt will replace Gregg Wallace on the next series of MasterChef: The Professionals.
6	Following his earlier suspension for using "unacceptable language" on the set of Strictly Come Dancing the previous year, the BBC announces that Jamie Borthwick has been axed from EastEnders after 19 years portraying the role of Jay Brown.
10	Ofcom announces the appointment of AO World chairman Geoff Cooper as the next chair of Channel 4.
10	The 30th National Television Awards are held in London. Gary Lineker wins the award for best television presenter, ending Ant and Dec's 23-year winning streak.
10	S4C announces a new five-year strategy that includes putting more emphasis on "digital first" content to attract younger viewers.
11	The BBC signs an agreement with the West Midlands Combined Authority and Create Central to increase annual spending on TV production in the West Midlands from £24m to £40m.
11	Sophie Willan is announced as the new presenter of The Great British Sewing Bee, succeeding Sara Pascoe in the role.
12	Piers Morgan Uncensored returns to television with a weekly 90-minute show on 5 showing highlights from Piers Morgan's YouTube show. The programme's launch following a deal between Morgan and Channel 5, which is reported to be the first between a major UK broadcaster and a YouTube channel.
13	Sir Brian May and Roger Taylor of Queen join the BBC Symphony Chorus for the first ever symphonic performance of "Bohemian Rhapsody" at the Last Night of the Proms.
16	Caz is announced as the winner of the 11th series of The Great British Sewing Bee.
17	The BBC announces that the documentary Ozzy Osbourne: Coming Home has been rescheduled to air on BBC One at 9pm on 2 October.
18	Llinos Griffin-Williams, who was dismissed as the boss of S4C in 2023 for allegedly being drunk and verbally abusive, launches a legal case against the channel for compensation worth several hundred thousand pounds.
22	ITV celebrates its 70th anniversary.
23	Dani Dyer is forced to pull out of series 23 of Strictly Come Dancing after breaking an ankle.
23	Former supermodel Janice Dickinson files a personal injury claim against ITV Studios for an injury she sustained after falling on the set of I'm a Celebrity... South Africa in 2023.
24	A social media advert by former Love Island contestant Lucinda Strafford which promoted a brand of vodka is banned from TikTok for targeting under-18s.
24	A report published by Oxford Economics indicates that YouTube content creators contributed £2.2bn to the UK economy in 2024.
24	Channel 4 launches its first Free ad-supported streaming television channels – 4Reality, 4Homes and 4Life. They are available on the Freely platform.
25	The BBC's complaints unit concludes that the broadcast of Bob Vylan's set at Glastonbury broke editorial guidelines with regard to harm and offence.
25	STV announces plans to cut 60 jobs as part of cost saving measures; some STV News programming could also be axed.
26	West End actress Amber Davies replaces Dani Dyer in the Strictly Come Dancing line up after Dyer was forced to pull out over a broken ankle.
27	Exactly two months after England had won the UEFA Women's Euro 2025 title in Switzerland, the 2025 Women's Rugby World Cup concludes with England winning the third title at Twickenham, defeating Canada 33–13. The match attracts a peak of 5.8 million viewers on TV.

=== October ===
Date	Event
1	Channel 4 have secured a five-year deal for the broadcast rights to The Boat Race, starting in 2026.
1	A ban on junk food advertising on British television before 9pm comes into force.
2	It is announced that Peaky Blinders will return for two further series set in the years after World War II.
8	ITV announces that George Gilbert, a contestant on series 22 of Big Brother, is removed from the house after "repeated use of unacceptable language and behaviour".
10	After nearly four decades, MTV is to stop showing rolling music videos in the UK, with MTV Music, MTV 80s, MTV 90s, Club MTV and MTV Live all closing by the end of the year.
10	S4C reaches an out-of-court settlement with its former boss, Sian Doyle.
11	Sienna Mcswiggan wins £1m on ITV's gameshow Win Win.
15	Celia Imrie's flatulence during a tense moment of The Celebrity Traitors becomes a memorable highlight of the show.
17	Ofcom rules that the BBC committed a "serious breach" of broadcasting rules by failing to disclose that the narrator of the documentary Gaza: How to Survive a Warzone was the son of a Hamas official.
17	The BBC confirms that broadcast of the latest series of Celebrity MasterChef will go ahead, featuring John Torode.
17	In the United States, Sir David Attenborough wins a Daytime Emmy Award for his Netflix series Secret Lives of Orangutans, making him the oldest person to win an Emmy at the age of 99.
20	Channel 4's Dispatches airs the documentary "Will AI Take My Job?", an examination of how automation and artificial intelligence is impacting the British workforce. The report is noted for using an AI-generated presenter, a British TV first that is not revealed to viewers until the very end of the hour.
20	Stefan Dennis withdraws from Strictly Come Dancing following an injury.
22	Brookside returns for a one-off special episode on E4 as part of the 30th anniversary of Hollyoaks.
23	Hollyoaks celebrates its 30th anniversary.
23	Tess Daly and Claudia Winkleman announce that they are to leave Strictly Come Dancing as presenters after the Christmas special after 21 and 11 years respectively hosting the main show.
25	Former US Presidential candidate Kamala Harris appears on Sunday with Laura Kuenssberg in what is her first UK television interview.
28	The BBC confirms there will be a Doctor Who Christmas special in 2026. The BBC will also stop partnering with Disney+ for international broadcasting for the next series. However, this special would eventually be cancelled in June of 2026 following the decision to put the show up for competitive tender.
29	The BBC News Channel, once again, stops simulcasting BBC Breakfast during the week, instead airing the global news service which, at that time of day, broadcasts rolling news and business reports. This change follows complaints about the reversal of its decision in April when it stopped the trial international simulcast. Breakfast will continue to air on the BBC News Channel at the weekend, unless there is breaking news at weekends when it will remain with the international feed.
29	It is announced that former SNP MP Mhairi Black is to join Counsels, a BBC legal drama set in Glasgow.

=== November ===
Date	Event
6	Alan Carr is revealed as winner of the first series of BBC One's The Celebrity Traitors. The episode is watched by an average audience of 11.1 million, making it the most watched television programme of the year.
6	The BBC confirms the finale of The Celebrity Traitors was accidentally uploaded to international platforms a day early.
6	The BBC's Executive Complaints Unit upholds 20 impartiality complaints against newsreader Martine Croxall because she altered a script she was reading live on the BBC News Channel, which referred to "pregnant people".
7	ITV announces that it is in "preliminary" discussions to sell its media and entertainment division to Sky for £1.6bn.
9	Tim Davie resigns as Director-General of the BBC and Deborah Turness resigns as its Head of News following criticism after the publication of an internal report that a Panorama documentary misled viewers by editing together two parts of a speech by US President Donald Trump to make it look like he had encouraged the 2021 Capitol riot.
10	Lawyers acting for US President Donald Trump have given the BBC a deadline of 14 November to make a "full and fair retraction" of the Panorama documentary in which two separate parts of a speech were edited together or face a $1bn (£760m) lawsuit.
10	The BBC have commissioned a second series of The Celebrity Traitors for 2026.
12	Reform UK says it will no longer co-operate with the making of a BBC documentary about the party following the controversy involving a Donald Trump speech.
12	ITV announces a change to bushtucker trials for the upcoming series of I'm a Celebrity...Get Me Out of Here! that means no one individual can be voted to do several in a row.
13	The BBC apologises to Trump over the Panorama documentary, but refuses to pay him any compensation.
13	EastEnders announce the return of Pat Butcher for December, with Pam St Clement reprising her role. The character was killed off in 2012 and is set to return as part of a dementia storyline involving Nigel Bates (Paul Bradley), where he will hallucinate Pat.
14	The BBC airs the Children in Need 2025 telethon, which raises £45m for charity on the night of its transmission.
14	Richard Storry wins the 22nd series of Big Brother, becoming the oldest winner of the series to date.
14	Trump says he will take legal action against the BBC over its Panorama documentary.
15	Two days after announcing Pam St Clement's return as Pat Evans, EastEnders announce that Shaun Williamson will reprise his role as Barry Evans in December, with the character also set to be hallucinated by Nigel (Paul Bradley). He last appeared in 2004.
15	Sky Sports announces it has scrapped its new female-focused TikTok channel, Halo, following a backlash online with critics describing its posts as "patronising" and "sexist". The channel was launched on 13 November.
18	The BBC confirms that Line of Duty will return for a seventh series, with filming to begin in Belfast in Spring 2026.
20	ITV announce that former Coronation Street actress Helen Worth will reprise her role as Gail Platt for a one-off episode appearance on Christmas Day.
20	Terence Duddy resigns as chair of BBC Children in Need after he is convicted of careless driving and crashing into a cyclist.
21	Shumeet Banerji resigns from the BBC Board over what he describes as "governance issues" at the top of the organisation.
22	La Voix drops out of Series 23 of Strictly Come Dancing after sustaining an injury.
24	BBC Chairman Samir Shah tells MPs he will stay in the post to "fix" the broadcaster's problems.
27	Bones is named the winner of the seventh series of RuPaul's Drag Race UK.
29	Data from Ofcom indicates 50% of adults in Northern Ireland use the BBC as their source of news, compared to 39% for the rest of the UK.
29	The BBC returns to the boxing ring when it shows its first professional fight for more than 20 years, following the Corporation signing a deal in August with promoter BOXXER.
30	Balvinder Sopal sets a new record on Strictly Come Dancing after surviving five dance-offs alongside her partner Julian Caillon, the most in the show's history.

=== December ===
Date	Event
1	ITV releases a trailer for the upcoming Coronation Street–Emmerdale crossover episode showing a multiple-vehicle collision.
2	It is announced that Friends will stop being available through Netflix from 30 December.
3	Gary Lineker has signed a deal with Netflix for it to carry his podcast, The Rest Is Football, during the 2026 FIFA World Cup.
7	Social media star Angryginge wins Series 25 of I'm a Celebrity...Get Me Out of Here!.
9	Coronation Street celebrates its 65th anniversary.
11	Broadcaster Roman Kemp and his sister Harleymoon win Series 3 of Celebrity Race Across the World.
11	ITV confirms the Coronation Street–Emmerdale crossover, titled Corriedale, will air on 5 January 2026.
12	In a recorded broadcast for Channel 4's Stand Up to Cancer, the King says that early diagnosis and "effective intervention" means his cancer treatment can be reduced in the new year.
15	Amazon apologises to the parents of a child after an error meant it showed the 15-rated film Love and Other Drugs by mistake when the family had tried to watch the PG-rated Diary of a Wimpy Kid.
16	The UK government considers a green paper outlining new ways of funding the BBC, with replacing the television licence with either advertising or a subscription model.
18	Rory McIlroy is named as the 2025 BBC Sports Personality of the Year.
19	The BBC announces an overhaul of its editorial committee following criticism of the way it handled concerns about the editing of its Panorama documentary concerning a speech Donald Trump made prior to the January 6 riots.
19	TNT Sports outbids the BBC to become the official partner of the 2026 Commonwealth Games, with live streaming of the games being held on HBO Max, which will launch in the UK in March.
20	Footballer Karen Carney and her professional partner Carlos Gu win the twenty-third series of Strictly Come Dancing.
25	Tess Daly and Claudia Winkleman present the Christmas Day edition of Strictly Come Dancing, their final edition of the series.
25	US presenter Jimmy Kimmel delivers Channel 4's Alternative Christmas Message in which he criticises US President Donald Trump and the rise of "tyranny".
26	Overnight viewing figures indicate that the King's Christmas Day Broadcast was viewed by an audience of almost 7m, and was achieved the highest number of viewers for the day.
28	An unseen script intended for a Christmas 1963 episode of Steptoe and Son which was shelved due to time constraints is unearthed at the University of York.
29	The BBC announces that Claudia Winkleman will host her own talk show, The Claudia Winkleman Show, which is set to debut in Spring 2026 on BBC One and BBC iPlayer.
30	Among those from the world of television to be recognised in the 2026 New Year Honours are actor Idris Elba, who receives a Knighthood, and television executive Charlotte Moore and television and radio presenter Gabby Logan, who receive OBEs, and actress Sally Lindsay, who receives an MBE.
31	BBC One airs Ronan Keating & Friends: A New Year's Eve Party to welcome in 2026.

== Debuts ==
=== BBC ===
Date	Debut	Channel
6 January	Joanna Page's Wild Life	BBC Two
9 January	Video Nasty	BBC Three
10 January	Monty Don's British Gardens	BBC Two
14 January	An t-Eilean	BBC Alba
20 January	Wonderblocks	CBeebies
2 February	Miss Austen	BBC One
5 February	Amandaland	BBC One
10 February	Virdee	BBC One
22 February	Dope Girls	BBC One
25 February	The One That Got Away	BBC Four
2 March	Towards Zero	BBC One
10 March	Chess Masters: The Endgame	BBC Two
17 March	High Hoops	CBBC
23 March	This City Is Ours	BBC One
24 March	Policing Paradise	BBC One
24 March	Crongton	BBC iPlayer
26 March	Rose Ayling-Ellis: Old Hands, New Tricks	BBC One
7 April	Reunion	BBC One
16 April	Just Act Normal	BBC Three
28 April	Hey Duggee's Squirrel Club	CBeebies
5 May	Anna Haugh's Big Irish Food Tour	BBC Two
9 May	Horrible Science	CBBC
13 May	Change Your Mind, Change Your Life	BBC One
16 May	Alison Hammond's Big Weekend	BBC One
18 May	The Bombing of Pan Am 103	BBC One
18 May	Scandinavia with Simon Reeve	BBC Two
25 May	Walking with Dinosaurs	BBC One
25 May	Death Valley	BBC One
2 June	Doorbell Detectives	BBC One
3 June	What It Feels Like for a Girl	BBC Three
14 June	Shifty	BBC iPlayer
5 July	Football Fantastics	CBeebies
7 July	Last Pundit Standing	BBC iPlayer
14 July	Human	BBC Two
15 July	Mix Tape	BBC Two
20 July	The Narrow Road to the Deep North	BBC One
24 July	Unforgivable	BBC Two
27 July	Inside the Cult of the Jesus Army	BBC Two
30 July	Destination X	BBC One
3 August	Parenthood	BBC One
19 August	Tommy: The Good. The Bad. The Fury	BBC Three
24 August	King & Conqueror	BBC One
1 September	The Guest	BBC One
3 September	Stranded on Honeymoon Island	BBC One
8 September	Global Eye	BBC Two
8 September	Thailand: The Dark Side of Paradise	BBC Three
14 September	Prayer and Reflection	BBC One
27 September	Nine Bodies in a Mexican Morgue	BBC One
28 September	Eva Longoria: Searching for Spain	BBC Two
2 October	Ozzy Osbourne: Coming Home	BBC One
3 October	How Are You? It's Alan (Partridge)	BBC One
4 October	The Inner Circle	BBC One
6 October	Trace, Track, Get My Car Back	BBC One
7 October	Film Club	BBC Three
8 October	The Celebrity Traitors	BBC One
12 October	Hamza's Hidden Wild Isles	BBC One
12 October	Riot Women	BBC One
13 October	Stage Stars	CBBC
21 October	The Ridge	BBC Scotland
25 October	I Spy You Spy	CBeebies
26 October	Daisy May and Charlie Cooper's NightWatch	BBC Two
27 October	Once Upon a Time in Space	BBC Two
7 November	Empire	BBC Two
9 November	Kingdom	BBC One
15 November	Wild Cherry	BBC One
23 November	Prisoner 951	BBC One
24 November	Gifted	CBBC
7 December	The War Between the Land and the Sea	BBC One
25 December	The Scarecrows' Wedding	BBC One
28 December	Titanic Sinks Tonight	BBC Two

=== ITV ===
Date	Debut	Channel
5 January	Playing Nice	ITV1
19 January	Out There	ITV1
5 March	A Cruel Love: The Ruth Ellis Story	ITV1
16 March	Protection	ITV1
22 March	99 to Beat	ITV1
26 April	The Assembly	ITV1
30 April	Genius Game	ITV1
18 May	Code of Silence	ITVX
20 June	Noel Edmonds's Kiwi Adventure	ITV1
24 June	Transaction	ITV2
14 July	Shark! Celebrity Infested Waters	ITV1
10 August	The Princess Diaries	ITV2
19 August	Sam and Billie: Sister Act	ITV2
31 August	I Fought the Law	ITV1
6 September	Win Win	ITV1
14 September	Coldwater	ITV1
24 September	The Hack	ITV1
5 October	Frauds	ITV1
13 October	Say! Less!	ITV1
16 October	Badjelly	ITVX
23 November	The Great Escapers	ITV1
14 December	Accidental Tourist	ITV1

=== Channel 4 ===
Date	Debut	Channel
8 January	Patience	Channel 4
29 January	Brian and Maggie	Channel 4
3 February	Go Back to Where You Came From	Channel 4
5 March	Get Millie Black	Channel 4
28 April	The Honesty Box	E4
12 May	Virgin Island	Channel 4
19 June	Pushers	Channel 4
2 July	Can't Sell, Must Sell	Channel 4
12 August	The Big Pound Shop Swap	Channel 4
12 August	In Flight	Channel 4
31 August	The Inheritance	Channel 4
5 September	Mitchell and Webb Are Not Helping	Channel 4
1 October	Grand Designs: Deconstructed	More4 & YouTube
7 October	Worlds Apart	Channel 4
2 November	Game of Wool: Britain's Best Knitter	Channel 4
9 November	Trespasses	Channel 4
11 November	No Strings Attached	E4
13 November	Still Waters	Channel 4
16 November	Summerwater	Channel 4
24 December	Finding Father Christmas	Channel 4

=== Channel 5/5 ===
Date	Debut	Channel
10 March	The Au Pair	5
14 April	The Feud	5
8 May	The Trial	5
12 May	The Game	5
19 June	Murder Most Puzzling	5
7 September	NFL Big Game Night (CBS Sports)	5Action
10 September	The Rumour	5
16 September	Michael Palin in Venezuela	5
7 October	Murder Before Evensong	5
20 October	The Forsytes	5
13 November	Play for Today	5
18 November	Cooper and Fry	5

=== Sky ===
Date	Debut	Channel
2 January	Lockerbie: A Search for Truth	Sky Atlantic
27 February	Small Town, Big Story	Sky Atlantic / Sky Max
22 April	Joe Lycett's United States Of Birmingham	Sky Max
20 May	Big Zuu & AJ Tracey's Seriously Rich Flavours	Sky Max
28 August	Atomic	Sky Atlantic
24 September	Romesh: Can't Knock the Hustle	Sky Max
16 October	The Iris Affair	Sky Atlantic
20 November	The Death of Bunny Munro	Sky Atlantic
21 December	Amadeus	Sky Atlantic

=== Other platforms ===
Date	Debut	Channel
1 January	Missing You	Netflix
16 January	The Crow Girl	Paramount+
22 January	Prime Target	Apple TV+
5 February	Celebrity Bear Hunt	Netflix
21 February	A Thousand Blows	Disney+ / Star
27 February	Bergerac	U&Drama
27 February	Toxic Town	Netflix
4 March	Fear	Amazon Prime Video
5 March	The Leopard	Netflix
13 March	Adolescence	Netflix
20 March	Wolf King	Netflix
20 March	LOL: Last One Laughing UK	Amazon Prime Video
30 March	MobLand	Paramount+
16 April	The Stolen Girl	Disney+ / Star
23 April	I, Jack Wright	U&Alibi
25 April	Flintoff	Disney+ / Star
30 April	Suspect: The Shooting of Jean Charles de Menezes	Disney+ / Star
22 May	Little Disasters	Paramount+
29 May	Dept. Q	Netflix
19 June	Outrageous	U&Drama
9 July	Building the Band	Netflix
10 July	Too Much	Netflix
16 July	Bookish	U&Alibi
25 July	The Assassin	Amazon Prime Video
18 August	The Real Housewives of London	Hayu
20 August	Mudtown	U&Alibi
21 August	Hostage	Netflix
10 September	The Girlfriend	Amazon Prime Video
25 September	House of Guinness	Netflix
25 September	Wayward	Netflix
22 October	Lazarus	Amazon Prime Video
29 October	Down Cemetery Road	Apple TV+
30 October	Art Detectives	U&Drama
13 November	Allegiance	U&Alibi
14 November	Malice	Amazon Prime Video
11 December	Man vs. Baby	Netflix
12 December	The Revenge Club	Paramount+

== Channels and streaming services ==
=== New channels ===
Date	Channel
14 April	Club MTV (UK)
9 June	ITV Quiz

=== Defunct channels/streaming services ===
Date	Channel
1 January	WWE Network
28 February	Eurosport
14 April	MTV Hits (UK)
22 April	Pop Max
9 June	ITVBe
29 August	Notts TV
30 October	Sky Replay
31 December
31 December	MTV Music
31 December	MTV Live
31 December	Club MTV
31 December	MTV 80s
31 December	MTV 90s

=== Rebranding channels/streaming services ===
Date	Old name	New name
12 March	Channel 5	5 (British TV channel)
12 March	My5	5 (streaming service)
8 October	Star	Hulu (Via Disney+)
13 October	Apple TV+	Apple TV

== Television programmes ==
=== Changes of network affiliation ===
Programme	Moved from	Moved to
The Simpsons	Channel 4 (Weekday re-runs)	E4
The Simpsons	Sky Showcase (First runs)	Disney+
Raw	TNT Sports	Netflix
Smackdown	TNT Sports	Netflix
NXT	WWE Network	Netflix
From	Sky Sci-Fi	Sky Max
Hacks	Prime Video	Sky Max
Stargirl	Prime Video	ITVX
Belgravia	ITV1	ITVX
Snowpiercer	Netflix	ITVX
Roswell, New Mexico	ITV2	ITVX
Shakespeare & Hathaway: Private Investigators	BBC One	U&Alibi
Doctor Who	BBC One	BBC iPlayer
The Terror	AMC Global	BBC Two
Black Snow	BBC Four	BBC Two
All Eurosport programming	Eurosport	TNT Sports
Faking It	Channel 4	5

=== Returning this year after a break of one year or longer ===
Programme	Date(s) of original removal	Original channel(s)	Date of return	New channel(s)
Faking It	26 December 2006	Channel 4	20 May 2025	5
Hollyoaks Later	6 January 2020	E4	22 October 2025	N/A (same channel as original)
The Celebrity Apprentice	13 February 2017	BBC One	29 December 2025	N/A (same channel as original)

== Continuing television programmes ==
=== 1920s ===
Programme	Date
BBC Wimbledon	1927–1939, 1946–2019, 2021–present

=== 1930s ===
Programme	Date
Trooping the Colour	1937–1939, 1946–2019, 2023–present
Boat Race	1938–1939, 1946–2019, 2021–present
BBC Cricket	1939, 1946–1999, 2020–present

=== 1950s ===
Programme	Date
Panorama	1953–present
Eurovision Song Contest	1956–2019, 2021–present
The Sky at Night	1957–present
Final Score	1958–present
Blue Peter	1958–present

=== 1960s ===
Programme	Date
Coronation Street	1960–present
Points of View	1961–present
Songs of Praise	1961–present
University Challenge	1962–1987, 1994–present
Doctor Who	1963–1989, 1996, 2005–2025
Horizon	1964–present
Match of the Day	1964–present
Top of the Pops	1964–2006, 2006–present
ITV Racing	1966–1985, 2017–present
ITV News at Ten	1967–1999, 2001–2004, 2008–present

=== 1970s ===
Programme	Date
Emmerdale	1972–present
Mastermind (including Celebrity Mastermind)	1972–1997, 2003–present
Football Focus	1974–1988, 1992–present
Arena	1975–present
BBC Snooker	1975–present
Ski Sunday	1978–present
Blankety Blank	1979–1990, 1997–2002, 2016, 2020–present
Antiques Roadshow	1979–present
Question Time	1979–present

=== 1980s ===
Programme	Date
BBC Children in Need	1980–present
Bullseye	1981–1995, 2006, 2024–present
Countdown	1982–present
EastEnders	1985–present
Comic Relief	1985–present
Catchphrase	1986–2002, 2013–present
Casualty	1986–present
This Morning	1988–present
Countryfile	1988–present
Wheel of Fortune	1988–2001, 2024–present
You Bet!	1988–1997, 2024–present
Home and Away	1989–2000, 2001–present

=== 1990s ===
Programme	Date
Have I Got News for You	1990–present
MasterChef	1990–2001, 2005–present
Gladiators	1992–2000, 2008–2009, 2024–present
ITV News Meridian	1993–2026
National Television Awards	1995–2008, 2010–present
Hollyoaks	1995–present
Silent Witness	1996–present
Classic Coronation Street	1996–2004, 2017–present
Midsomer Murders	1997–present
Classic Emmerdale	1998–2004, 2019–present
Who Wants to Be a Millionaire?	1998–2014, 2018–present
The British Soap Awards	1999–2019, 2022–2023, 2025
Loose Women	1999–present

=== 2000s ===
Programme	Date
Bargain Hunt	2000–present
BBC Breakfast	2000–present
Big Brother	2000–2018, 2023–present
Celebrity Big Brother	2000–2018, 2024–present
Unreported World	2000–present
BBC South East Today	2001–present
Escape to the Country	2002–present
I'm a Celebrity...Get Me Out of Here!	2002–present
River City	2002–2026
Saturday Kitchen	2002–present
Homes Under the Hammer	2003–present
Match of the Day 2	2004–2025
Strictly Come Dancing	2004–present
The Big Fat Quiz of the Year	2004–present
BBC Newswatch	2004–present
Strictly Come Dancing: It Takes Two	2004–present
Who Do You Think You Are?	2004–present
The Apprentice	2005–present
Classic Doctors	2005, 2023–present
Deal or No Deal	2005–2016, 2023–present
Dragons' Den	2005–present
The Hotel Inspector	2005–present
Pocoyo	2005–present
Springwatch	2005–present
The Apprentice: You're Fired!	2006–present
Dancing on Ice	2006–2014, 2018–2025
Not Going Out	2006–present
The One Show	2006–present
Soccer Aid	2006–present
Waterloo Road	2006–2015, 2023–present
Britain's Got Talent	2007–2020, 2022–present
Would I Lie to You?	2007–present
Pointless	2009–present
The Chase	2009–present
Kate Garraway's Life Stories	2009–present

=== 2010s ===
Programme	Date
The Great British Bake Off	2010–present
Great British Railway Journeys	2010–present
The Only Way Is Essex	2010–present
Junior Bake Off	2010–present
Death in Paradise	2011–present
The Jonathan Ross Show	2011–present
Made in Chelsea	2011–present
Pointless Celebrities	2011–2025
8 Out of 10 Cats Does Countdown	2012–present
Call the Midwife	2012–present
The Voice UK	2012–present
Tipping Point	2012–present
The Dumping Ground	2013–present
Father Brown	2013–present
Agatha Raisin	2014–present
GPs: Behind Closed Doors	2014–present
Good Morning Britain	2014–present
Grantchester	2014, 2016–2017, 2019–present
STV News at Six	2014–present
The Great British Bake Off: An Extra Slice	2014–present
Hunted	2015–present
Love Island	2015–present
Taskmaster	2015–present
Travel Man	2015–present
Bake Off: The Professionals	2016–present
James Martin's Saturday Morning	2016–present
Love Island: Aftersun	2017–present
The Repair Shop	2017–present
Richard Osman's House of Games	2017–present
Strike	2017–present
Peston	2018–present
Glow Up: Britain's Next Make-Up Star	2019–present
The Hit List	2019–present
RuPaul's Drag Race UK	2019–present

=== 2020s ===
Programme	Date
2020
Beat the Chasers	2020–present
Malory Towers	2020–2025
The Masked Singer	2020–present
Trying	2020–present
The Wheel	2020–present
2021
Cooking with the Stars	2021–present
Hope Street	2021–present
2022
The 1% Club	2022–present
Limitless Win	2022–present
Heartstopper	2022–present
The Traitors	2022–present
Trigger Point	2022–present
Riddiculous	2022, 2024–present
2023
BBC News Now	2023–present
Black Ops	2023–present
Blue Lights	2023–present
Beyond Paradise	2023–present
Changing Ends	2023–present
Doctor Who: Unleashed	2023–present
I Kissed a Boy	2023, 2025
PopMaster TV	2023–present
The Couple Next Door	2023–present
The Famous Five	2023–present
The Finish Line	2023–present
The Piano	2023–present
The Toy Hospital	2023–present
2024
After the Flood	2024–present
Boarders	2024–present
The Golden Cobra	2024–present
Love Island: All Stars	2024–present
Ludwig	2024–present
Only Child	2024–present
Return to Paradise	2024–present
Sweetpea	2024–present
The Answer Run	2024–present

== Ending this year ==
Date	Programme	Channel(s)	Debut(s)
2 January	Vera	ITV1	2011
9 March	Dancing on Ice	ITV1	2006 & 2018
26 March	HARDtalk	BBC News	1997
22 April	Food Unwrapped	Channel 4	2012
31 May	Doctor Who	BBC One	1963, 1996 & 2005
5 June	The British Soap Awards	ITV1	1999
15 June	I Kissed a Boy	BBC Three	2023 & 2025
16 August	Pointless Celebrities	BBC One	2011
11 September	Wolf King	Netflix	2025
22 September	The Guest	BBC One	2025
30 October	Brassic	Sky One / Sky Max	2019
7 November	The Great British Bake Off: An Extra Slice	BBC Two / Channel 4	2014
14 November	Married at First Sight UK	Channel 4 / E4	2015
18 November	Malory Towers	CBBC	2020
14 December	Kingdom	BBC One	2025
15 December	The Big Quiz	ITV1	2011
17 December	A League of Their Own	Sky One / Sky Max	2010
21 December	The War Between the Land and the Sea	BBC One	2025
27 December	You Bet!	ITV1	1988 & 2024
31 December	Titanic Sinks Tonight	BBC Two	2025

== Deaths ==
Date	Name	Age	Broadcast credibility
3 January	The Vivienne	32	Drag performer (RuPaul's Drag Race UK, RuPaul's Drag Race All Stars, Dancing on Ice)
7 January	Barbara Clegg	98	Actress (Emergency Ward 10) and scriptwriter (Doctor Who, Coronation Street)
8 January	Charles Kay	94	Actor (Churchill's People, Edge of Darkness, I, Claudius)
9 January	Laurie Holloway	86	Musical director (Parkinson, Strictly Come Dancing) and theme tune composer (Maggie and Her, Game for a Laugh, Blind Date, Beadle's About)
10 January	Christopher Benjamin	90	Actor (Doctor Who, Judge John Deed)
14 January	Tony Slattery	65	Actor and comedian (Whose Line Is It Anyway?, Have I Got News for You, The Music Game, Just a Minute)
15 January	Linda Nolan	65	Irish singer and television personality (Top of the Pops, Celebrity Big Brother, Loose Women)
15 January	Paul Danan	46	Actor (Hollyoaks, Love Island)
15 January	Diane Langton	80	Actress (The Rag Trade, Hollyoaks, Only Fools and Horses, EastEnders)
16 January	Dame Joan Plowright	95	Actress (Stalin, The Importance of Being Earnest, 101 Dalmatians)
18 January	Claire van Kampen	71	Composer (Wolf Hall), playwright and theatre director
30 January	Marianne Faithfull	78	Singer and actress (Hamlet, Absolutely Fabulous)
2 February	P. H. Moriarty	86	Actor (Bird of Prey, The Bill, Doctors)
2 February	Brian Murphy	92	Actor (Man About the House, George and Mildred, Last of the Summer Wine, Wizadora, The Catherine Tate Show, Benidorm)
16 February	Julian Holloway	80	Actor (Play for Today, Doctor Who, Whatever Happened to the Likely Lads?, Remember WENN)
18 February	James Martin	93	Scottish actor (Still Game)
25 February	Henry Kelly	78	Irish television presenter (Game for a Laugh, Going for Gold)
3 March	Kathryn Apanowicz	64	Actress (Angels, EastEnders) and presenter (Calendar)
7 March	Richard Fortey	79	Palaeontologist and television presenter (BBC Four)
9 March	Simon Fisher-Becker	63	Actor (Doctor Who, Puppy Love, Doctors)
21 March	Eddie Jordan	76	Broadcaster (Grand Prix, Channel 4 F1), motorsport executive, racing driver and businessman.
22 March	Andy Peebles	76	Radio DJ, television presenter (Top of the Pops) and cricket commentator
30 March	Lee Montague	97	Actor (Danger Man, Bergerac, The Sweeney, Space: 1999)
3 April	John Saint Ryan	72	Actor (Emmerdale, Coronation Street)
11 April	Mike Berry	82	Actor (Are You Being Served?) and singer
13 April	Jean Marsh	90	Actress (Upstairs, Downstairs, The House of Eliott) and television writer, Emmy winner (1975)
16 April	Colin Berry	79	Presenter (Eurovision Song Contest) and newsreader
25 April	Philip Lowrie	88	Actor (Coronation Street, War and Peace, Andy Capp)
23 May	Barbara Ferris	88	Actress (Coronation Street)
24 May	Alan Yentob	78	Television executive, director (Cracked Actor) and presenter, controller of BBC2 (1987–1993) and BBC1 (1993–1996)
9 June	Pik-Sen Lim	80	Malaysian-born British actress (Doctor Who, Mind Your Language, Coronation Street, The Bill, Cracker, Little Britain)
16 June	Kim Woodburn	83	Television personality (Celebrity Big Brother, How Clean Is Your House?, I'm a Celebrity...Get Me Out of Here!)
29 June	Sandy Gall	97	Journalist (News at Ten)
30 June	Frank Barrie	88	Actor (EastEnders, Softly, Softly, Special Branch, On Giant's Shoulders)
30 June	Kenneth Colley	87	Actor (EastEnders, HolbyBlue, Casualty)
2 July	Gerald Harper	96	Actor (Adam Adamant Lives!, Hadleigh, Gazette)
7 July	Wayne Dobson	68	Magician (Wayne Dobson – A Kind of Magic)
9 July	Glen Michael	99	Children's television presenter (Glen Michael's Cartoon Cavalcade)
15 July	Judy Loe	78	Actress (Ace of Wands, Goodnight and God Bless, Casualty)
22 July	Ozzy Osbourne	76	Musician, songwriter and television personality (The Osbournes)
23 July	Tony Peers	78	Actor (Emmerdale, Coronation Street, L.A. Without a Map)
2 August	Norman Eshley	80	Actor (George and Mildred, Brookside, The Bill)
4 August	James Whale	74	Radio DJ and television presenter
9 August	Ray Brooks	86	Actor (Mr Benn, Big Deal, Running Wild, Growing Pains, EastEnders)
10 August	Biddy Baxter	92	Children's television editor (Blue Peter)
17 August	Terence Stamp	87	Actor (Chessgame, The Hunger, His Dark Materials)
23 August	Gerry Harrison	89	Sports commentator (ITV)
21 September	John Stapleton	79	Journalist and broadcaster (Nationwide, Watchdog, The Time, The Place, TV-am, ITV Breakfast)
29 September	Patrick Murray	68	Actor (Only Fools and Horses, Scum, Quadrophenia)
3 October	Dame Patricia Routledge	96	Actress and singer (Keeping Up Appearances, Talking Heads, Hetty Wainthropp Investigates, Coronation Street, Anybody's Nightmare, Victoria Wood: As Seen on TV)
6 October	John Woodvine	96	Actor (An American Werewolf in London, Z-Cars, Doctor Who, Coronation Street)
13 October	Tony Caunter	88	Actor (EastEnders, Juliet Bravo, Queenie's Castle)
15 October	Samantha Eggar	86	Actress (The Collector, Doctor Dolittle, The Brood, Hercules)
18 October	Nabil Shaban	72	Jordanian-born actor (Doctor Who)
25 October	Tony Adams	84	Welsh actor (Crossroads, Doctor Who, General Hospital)
27 October	Prunella Scales	93	Actress (Marriage Lines, Fawlty Towers, A Question of Attribution, Coronation Street, Mapp & Lucia, Great Canal Journeys)
2 November	Trevor Bowen	c.84	Actor and screenwriter (A Family at War, The Inspector Alleyn Mysteries)
2 November	Richard Gott	87	Historian and journalist (The Guardian)
5 November	Pauline Collins	85	Actress (Upstairs, Downstairs, No, Honestly, Wodehouse Playhouse, Thomas & Sarah, The Liver Birds, Forever Green, Doctor Who, The Ambassador, Bleak House, Mount Pleasant, Dickensian)
8 November	Quentin Willson	68	Television presenter (Top Gear, The Car's the Star, Britain's Worst Driver, Fifth Gear)
16 November	Charlotte Bingham	83	Scriptwriter (Upstairs, Downstairs, Play for Today, Robin's Nest)
24 November	Jill Freud	98	Actress (Torchy the Battery Boy, Love Actually)
24 November	Jack Shepherd	85	Actor (Wycliffe, Bill Brand, Count Dracula, The Golden Compass, The Nativity)
11 December	Stanley Baxter	99	Scottish actor and comedian (The Stanley Baxter Show, The Stanley Baxter Picture Show, The Stanley Baxter Series, Mr Majeika)
17 December	William Rush	31	Actor (Waterloo Road, Grange Hill, Coronation Street), musician, and contestant on The X Factor
19 December	Lorraine Cheshire	65	Actress (Early Doors, Waterloo Road, Trollied, Ackley Bridge)
31 December	Elizabeth Kelly	104	Actress (EastEnders)

== See also ==
- 2025 in British radio
