= Topit =

Hidden pocket used in magic tricks

A topit (/ˈtɒpɪt/), also called a poacher's pouch, is a pocket installed inside a jacket for use by magicians in disposing of objects secretly. Used while standing up and popular in closeup magic, it plays a similar role in the magician's toolkit to pulls, holdouts, servantes, and techniques such as sleeving or lapping.

== History of use ==
Poachers' pouches were employed by pickpockets and thieves in the nineteenth century. The use of poachers' pouches then developed, like many other forms of magic, in symbiotic relationship between magicians and grifters, both sleight of hand artists.

Topits were first widely introduced to magic by Harold Comden in the 1920s, under the name "The 'Topit' Vanisher". Magician Pat Page popularized them in his booklet The Topit Handbook (1966), and Michael Ammar further refined topit technique in The Topit Book (1983) and The Topit Book 2.0 (2014), inspiring a number of closeup magicians to adopt their use.
