= Lapping (disambiguation) =

Lapping is a machining process in which two surfaces are rubbed together with an abrasive between them.

Lapping may also refer to:

- Lapping (magic), a set of techniques in conjuring
- Lapping (motorsport), the act of passing someone who is one circuit behind
- Lapping, the licking movement of an animal's tongue, usually for drinking
- Lapping fraud or teeming and lading, an accounting scheme
