= Pat Page =

Pat Page may refer to:

- Harlan Page (1887–1965), known as Pat, basketball player and sportsman
- Patrick Page (born 1962), actor and playwright
- Pat Page (magician) (1929–2010), British magician
