= Linda Lusardi =

English model, television presenter and actress

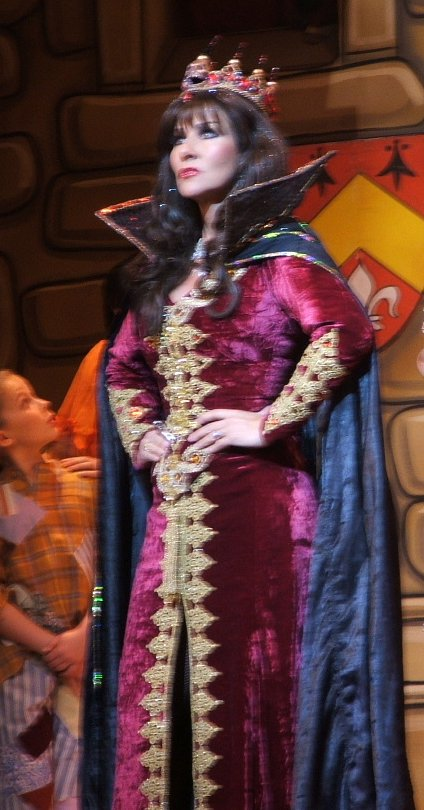
- Lusardi as Queen Lucretia in 2005
- Born: Linda Frances Elide Lusardi; 18 September 1958 (age 68); Wood Green, London, England
- Occupations: Actress; model; television presenter
- Spouse: Samuel Kane (m. 1998)
- Children: 2
- Parents: Nello Lusardi (father); Lilian Glassman (mother)

Linda Frances Elide Lusardi (born 18 September 1958) is an English actress, television presenter and former glamour model.

== Early life ==
Lusardi was born in Wood Green, London, to Lilian (née Glassman; 1932–2023) and Nello Lusardi (1930–2017). Her mother was born in Edmonton, Middlesex and her father in Hackney, east London, to Italian parents and was raised in Palmers Green.

== Career ==
=== Modelling ===
In 1976, at the age of 18, she began posing for pictures as a Page 3 girl in The Sun, where she continued to appear until 1988. She appeared nude in the men's magazines Mayfair in February 1977 and Fiesta in November 1977.

=== Television, film and stage acting ===
As an actress, Lusardi has appeared in the drama series The Bill playing the girlfriend of corrupt officer DS Don Beech and also in Hollyoaks and Brookside. On 12 February 2007, she joined the cast of Emmerdale as Carrie Nicholls, an ex-girlfriend of Tom King and mother of his secret child, Scarlett. She left the programme after a year.

Lusardi has appeared in films including Snappers, The Zero Imperative, Oh Minnie, Consuming Passions and The Krays: Dead Man Walking.

Lusardi has starred as Eliza Doolittle in Pygmalion at the Malvern Festival and toured in Happy as a Sandbag, Funny Peculiar, Bedside Manners, Not Now, Darling, Rock with Laughter, No Sex Please, We're British, and Doctor on the Boil. Lusardi took her own show to the British Forces in Belize, the Falklands and Northern Ireland.

She is a supporter of UK pantomime and often stars with her husband Sam Kane each Christmas at major theatres in the UK. Recent venues have been Woking, Southend-on-Sea, Plymouth, and Llandudno. Lusardi has starred in over 25 pantomimes.

=== Other television work ===
Lusardi appeared in two series of A Kind of Magic, as assistant to Wayne Dobson on ITV, and a season of Loose Women in 2002. She later returned in 2014 to 2015 and made a few guest panellist appearances. She regularly presented Wish You Were Here...?, Miss Northern Ireland, chat show It's Bizarre, Film Review and No Smoking on ITV. Lusardi took part in the reality show The Games in 2004, ITV daytime programme Have I Been Here Before? and BBC One's Hole in the Wall in 2009. She also sells Lusardi My Miracle, a range of skin-care products, on the shopping television channel Ideal World.

In 1992, she appeared in the "Dead Ringer" observation round of The Krypton Factor and appeared in a special edition of Bullseye presented by Jim Bowen. Lusardi appeared on Ant & Dec's Saturday Night Takeaway on ITV and in the Royal Variety Performance, as well as Celebrity Eggheads and Pointless Celebrities on the BBC. She also appeared briefly as herself in the BBC sitcom Detectorists.

=== Reality TV ===
In January 2008, Lusardi joined ITV's Dancing on Ice, finishing in sixth place. Her professional skating partner was Daniel Whiston, who temporarily moved into her family home to make training more convenient. Lusardi had to catch up with her fellow skaters after falling and breaking a bone in her foot during her first hour on the ice. She also won the Channel 4 show Celebrity Come Dine With Me in 2008. In the show, she was voted the best dinner host by her fellow contestants Abi Titmuss, Rodney Marsh, Lesley Joseph and Paul Ross. Lusardi participated in the 2011 series of Celebrity Masterchef, where she reached the final five. In December 2020, she took part in The Real Full Monty on Ice for charity.

== Personal life ==
Lusardi has been married to actor Samuel Kane since August 1998 and they share a son and daughter.

== Charity work ==
She is a patron of two charities, the Willow Foundation and the Rhys Daniels Trust.

== Selected filmography ==
Year	Title	Role	Notes
1982	The New Kenny Everett Naughty Video	Various Characters	Straight-to-Video
1988	Consuming Passions	French Beauty	Supporting Role
1988	Olympus Force: The Key	Suzie	Supporting Role
1990	Family Fortunes	Alice	Guest Role (1 Episode)
1991	A Kind of Magic	Wayne’s Assistant	Recurring Role (5 Episodes)
1994	P.R.O.B.E	Louise Bayliss	Guest Role (1 Episode)
1996	Noel’s House Party	House Guest	1 Episode
1998	Brookside: Friday the 13th	Franki	Main Role
1998–1999	Brookside	Franki Morgan	Recurring Role (3 Episodes)
2000–2004	The Bill	Maggie	Recurring Role (9 Episodes)
2006	Dancing on Ice	Herself	Contestant (10 Episodes)
2007–2008	Emmerdale	Carrie Nichols	Series Regular (52 Episodes)
2009	Hole in the Wall	Herself	Contestant (1 Episode)
2009	Ready, Steady, Cook	Herself	Contestant (1 Episode)
2009	Come Dine With Me	Herself	Participant (5 Episodes)
2011	Celebrity Masterchef	Herself	Contestant (5 Episodes)
2012–2014	Big Brother’s Bit on the Side	Herself	Regular Panelist (4 Episodes)
2014	What’s the Score?	Gloria	Supporting Role
2017	Detectorists	Herself	Guest Role (1 Episode)
2018	The Krays: Dead Man Walking	Sally Mitchell	Supporting Role
2018	The Wright Stuff	Herself	Guest Panelist (1 Episode)
2019	Lorraine	Herself	Guest (1 Episode)
2020	The Real Full Monty	Herself	Participant (2 Episodes)
2020	Wonderbirds	Herself/Lovely Lolly Lender	Online Series (1 Episode)
2021	Celebrity Ghost Trip	Herself	Participant (4 Episodes)
2024	Mandy	Linda	Guest Role (1 Episode)

== Selected theatre credits ==
Year	Title	Role	Notes
1988–1989	Cinderella	Cinderella	Dartford Orchard, Dartford
1989	Pygmalion	Eliza Doolittle	Malvern Festival
1989–1990	Snow White and the Seven Dwarfs	Snow White	The Hexagon Theatre, Reading
1992–1993	Snow White and the Seven Dwarfs	Snow White	Ashcroft Theatre, Croydon
1993–1994	Snow White and the Seven Dwarfs	Snow White	Wolverhampton Grand, Wolverhampton
1994–1995	Snow White and the Seven Dwarfs	Snow White	Darlington Civic, Darlington
1995–1996	Dick Whittington	Fairy Bowbells	Bradford Alhambra, Bradford
1997–1998	Snow White and the Seven Dwarfs	Snow White	The Hexagon Theatre, Reading
1998–1999	Robin Hood	Maid Marian	Wolverhampton Grand, Wolverhampton
1999–2000	Snow White and the Seven Dwarfs	Wicked Queen	Theatre Royal, Nottingham, Nottingham
2000–2001	Snow White and the Seven Dwarfs	Wicked Queen	Wimbledon Theatre, Wimbledon
2001–2002	Snow White and the Seven Dwarfs	Wicked Queen	New Theatre, Cardiff
2002–2003	Snow White and the Seven Dwarfs	Wicked Queen	Darlington Civic, Darlington
2003–2004	Snow White and the Seven Dwarfs	Wicked Queen	Churchill Theatre, Bromley
2004–2005	Snow White and the Seven Dwarfs	Wicked Queen	New Victoria Theatre, Woking
2005–2006	Snow White and the Seven Dwarfs	Wicked Queen	Cliffs Pavilion, Southend
2006–2007	Snow White and the Seven Dwarfs	Wicked Queen	Theatre Royal, Plymouth, Plymouth
2008–2009	Snow White and the Seven Dwarfs	Wicked Queen	Wycombe Swan, High Wycombe
2009–2010	Snow White and the Seven Dwarfs	Wicked Queen	Royal & Derngate, Northampton
2010–2011	Cinderella	Fairy Godmother	Venue Cymru, Llandudno
2011–2012	Snow White and the Seven Dwarfs	Wicked Queen	Wolverhampton Grand, Wolverhampton
2012–2013	Sleeping Beauty	Maleficent	Darlington Civic, Darlington
2013–2014	Sleeping Beauty	Maleficent	Royal & Derngate, Northampton
2014–2015	Cinderella	Fairy Godmother	New Theatre, Cardiff
2015–2016	Aladdin	Spirit of the Ring	New Theatre, Cardiff
2016–2017	Cinderella	Fairy Godmother	Crowns Theatre, Hull
2017–2018	Sleeping Beauty	Maleficent	Gravesend, The Woodville, Gravesend
2018–2019	Snow White and the Seven Dwarfs	Wicked Queen	The Playhouse Theatre, Weston-super-Mare
2019	The Wizard of Oz	Wicked Witch of the West	Theatre Royal, St Helens
2019–2020	Cinderella	Fairy Godmother	The Playhouse Theatre, Weston-super-Mare
