= James Bluemel =

Documentary filmmaker

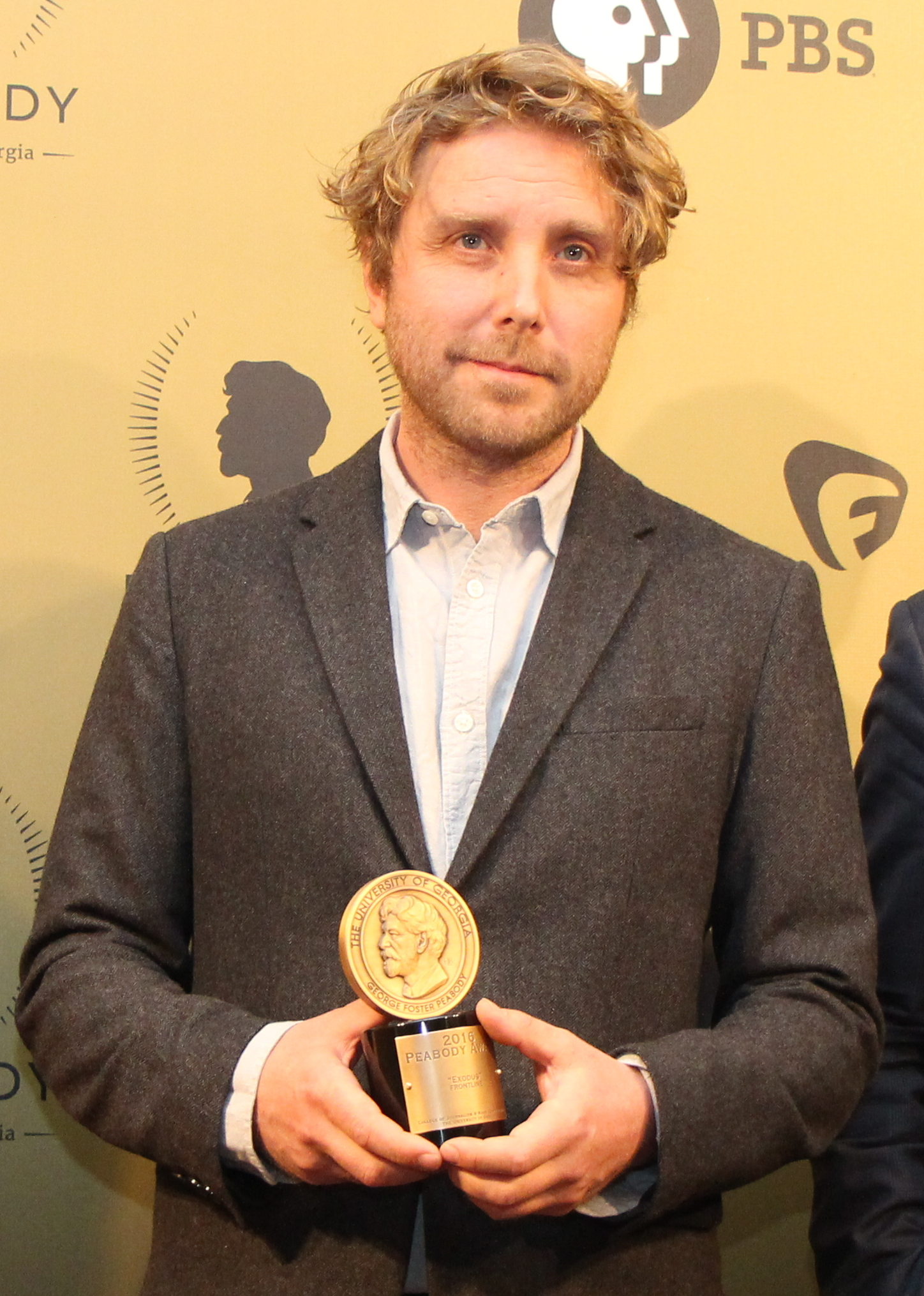
Bluemel at the 76th Peabody Awards in 2017

James Bluemel is a television documentary filmmaker.

== Career ==
He directed the three-part documentary The Romanians are Coming, screened on Channel 4 between 17 February and 3 March 2015. Bluemel visited Baia Mare, a town in north Romania and was shocked to see the living conditions of the Roma community there. The documentary focuses on Sandhu, a member of this community, who decides to come to the United Kingdom. The documentary also follows Mihaila a middle-aged nurse, who comes from more comfortable circumstances in Constantia on the Black Sea coast. Other people featured are Stefan, who works as a human statue whilst raising money for his daughter's operation and Adi, who sleeps rough so he can send more money back to his wife in Romania.

In 2016 his three-part documentary Exodus: Our Journey to Europe was aired. For directing this Bluemel won the 2017 British Academy Television Craft Award for best factual programme. At the award ceremony Bluemel broke with convention to allow Hassan Akkad - one of the refugees featured in the programme - to participate in the acceptance speech.

In July 2020, the BBC in the UK and PBS Frontline in America released the documentary Once Upon a Time in Iraq, directed by Bluemel, recounting the lead up to the Iraq War and its consequences for the Iraqi population. While the documentary was criticized by some for incomplete representation of the Iraqi experience throughout the initial conflict and its aftermath, the series was widely acclaimed in the British press, and won the award for best documentary at the Rose D'Or international awards festival in December 2020

== Filmography ==
- Pompeii... Live! (2006)
- Ballad of AJ Weberman (2006)
- The 9/11 Faker - Episode of Cutting Edge (2008)
- Make Me an MP (2009)
- The Hospital (2010)
- Skint (2013)
- The Romanians Are Coming (2015)
- Exodus: Our Journey to Europe (2016)
- Exodus: Our Journey Continues (2017)
- The Foreign Doctors Are Coming (2018)
- Once Upon a Time in Iraq (2020)
- The Virus that Shook the World, a.k.a. Pandemic 2020 (2021)
- Once Upon a Time in Northern Ireland (2023)
- Once Upon a Time in Space (2025)
- One in a Million (2026)

== Bibliography ==
- Once Upon a Time in Iraq (with Renad Mansour) (2019) ISBN 9781785944567
- Once Upon a Time in Space (2025) ISBN 978-1785949807
