= Samuel Kane =

English actor, singer and ex talent agent

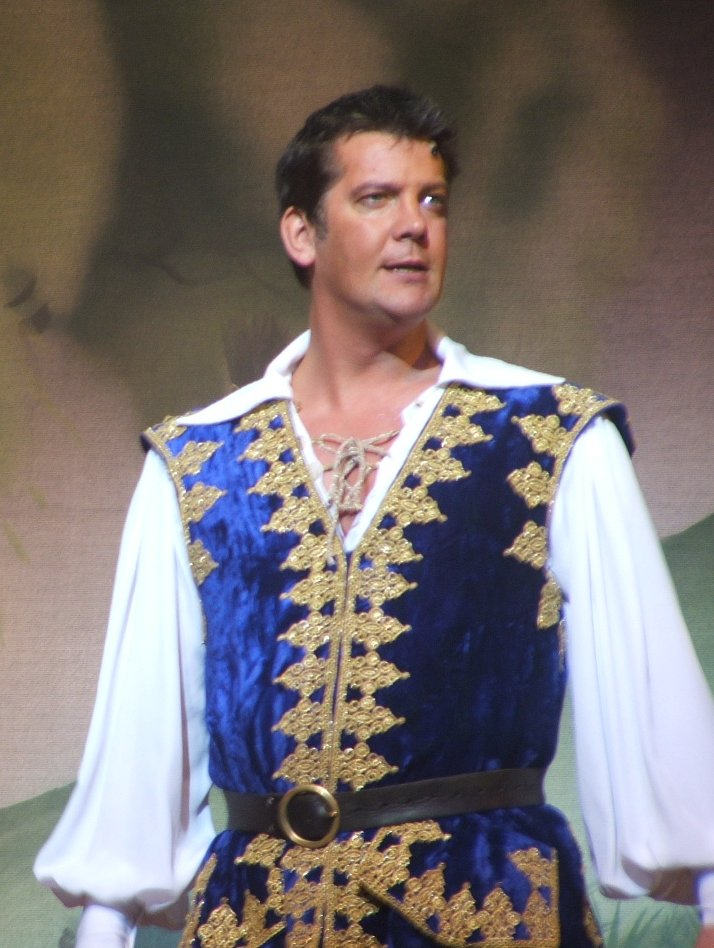
- Kane in October 2006
- Born: Samuel McGlashan; 30 November 1968 (age 57); Huyton, Merseyside, England
- Occupations: Actor, singer, talent agent
- Years active: 1995–present
- Spouse: Linda Lusardi (m. 1998)
- Children: 2

Samuel Kane (né McGlashan; born 30 November 1968) is an English actor, singer, and talent agent.

== Early life ==
Kane was born Kenneth McGlashan on 30 November 1968 in Huyton, Merseyside.

== Career ==
Kane has appeared in soap operas such as Brookside, Coronation Street, and Emmerdale.

== Personal life ==
Kane married former page 3 model Linda Lusardi on 9 August 1998. They have two children.

== Filmography ==
As actor

- Emmerdale (2008)
- Coronation Street (2001)
- Brookside (1995–1999)
- Vendetta (2013)
- The Royal (2007)

As himself

- Loose Women (2008)
- Dancing on Ice (2006)
- Top Variety Night (2005)
- An Audience with Joe Pasquale (2005)
- Loose Lips (2003)
- Another Audience with Ken Dodd (2002) (TV)
- Fort Boyard (1999)
- Night Fever (1999)
- Blankety Blank (1999)
- An Audience with the Bee Gees (1998)
- Gladiators (1997)
- Pointless (with Linda Lusardi) (2013)
