= The Stanley Baxter Series =

Television series

- Genre: Comedy
- Starring: Stanley Baxter
- Country of origin: United Kingdom
- Original language: English
- No. of series: 1
- No. of episodes: 6

Production
- Running time: 30 minutes
- Production company: London Weekend Television

Original release
- Network: ITV
- Release: 17 October – 21 November 1981

The Stanley Baxter Series is a British comedy television show which was originally broadcast on the ITV in 1981. It was Baxter's first weekly sketch show for nine years since the first series of his The Stanley Baxter Picture Show, as he had concentrated on producing one-off specials since then. It took five and a half months to make and the six episodes were given a Saturday evening slot. Baxter was nominated for the British Academy Television Award for Best Entertainment Performance losing out to Nigel Hawthorne for Yes Minister.

== Bibliography ==
- Barfe, Louis. Turned Out Nice Again: The Story of British Light Entertainment. Atlantic Books, 2013.
- Vahimagi, Tise . British Television: An Illustrated Guide. Oxford University Press, 1996.
