= Wayne Dobson – A Kind of Magic =

- Also known as: A Kind of Magic
- Genre: Magic; Comedy
- Directed by: Nigel Lythgoe (Series 1–2); David G. Hillier (Series 3)
- Presented by: Wayne Dobson
- Starring: Linda Lusardi
- Country of origin: United Kingdom
- Original language: English
- No. of series: 3
- No. of episodes: 18

Production
- Executive producer: Tony Wolfe
- Producers: Nigel Lythgoe (Series 1–2); Richard Holloway (Series 3)
- Running time: 27 minutes (inc. adverts)
- Production company: Central Independent Television

Original release
- Network: ITV
- Release: 12 May 1990 – 30 May 1992

Wayne Dobson – A Kind of Magic is a British magic television series produced by Central Independent Television for the ITV network, and that aired on Saturday evenings for eighteen episodes between 12 May 1990 and 30 May 1992. The show was hosted by Wayne Dobson who was the primary performer, and former glamour model Linda Lusardi from the first two seasons. However, for the third and final season, Lusardi was replaced by a selection of guest stars. Each week, Dobson would perform a number of close-up tricks and comedy sketches, before closing the show with a large-scale illusion featuring either Lusardi or that week's guest star including Bobby Davro, Marti Caine, Richard and Judy, Annabel Croft, Amanda Barrie and Liza Goddard.

== Transmissions ==
Series	Episodes	Originally released	
Series	Episodes	First released	Last released
1	6	12 May 1990	16 June 1990
2	6	27 April 1991	8 June 1991
3	6	25 April 1992	30 May 1992
