= Servante =

Servantes are theatrical properties or "props" used by magicians. Their purpose is to assist the magician to misdirect the audience by storing and concealing items, such as playing cards, cups, or balls. The term "servante" comes from the French for "dumbwaiter."

== Usage ==
Servantes may be drawers or shelves built into the magician's table, out of sight of onlookers. These are often padded or lined with felt to allow the magician to drop objects onto it quietly. Another type of servante is a simple bag or pouch hanging from the magician's belt or vest.

Some magicians keep their props in plain sight; a ring may be used to keep the pouch open. Other magicians keep their servantes concealed to enhance the illusion.
