= The Stanley Baxter Picture Show =

British TV comedy series (1972–1975)

- Genre: Comedy
- Written by: Ken Hoare; Eric Merriman; Stanley Baxter
- Directed by: David Bell
- Starring: Stanley Baxter
- Country of origin: United Kingdom
- Original language: English
- No. of series: 1 + 3 specials
- No. of episodes: 7

Production
- Producer: David Bell
- Production company: London Weekend Television

Original release
- Network: ITV
- Release: 2 October 1972 – 19 September 1975

The Stanley Baxter Picture Show is a British comedy television show which was originally broadcast on ITV. It featured an initial series of four episodes in 1972, followed by one-off specials in each of the successive years. As a sketch show, it largely followed the same format of Baxter's successful BBC series The Stanley Baxter Show.

The show has a focus on parodying popular films and television series, with Baxter sometimes playing several roles in a single show. Amongst other hit ITV shows that Baxter did impressions of were The Benny Hill Show and Upstairs, Downstairs.

== Bibliography ==
- Barfe, Louis. Turned Out Nice Again: The Story of British Light Entertainment. Atlantic Books Ltd, 2013.
