= Mr Majeika =

Fantasy series by Humphrey Carpenter

Mr Majeika is a series of children's books written by Humphrey Carpenter and published between 1984 and 2006. It was adapted into a children's television series produced by TVS for ITV, and aired between 1988 and 1990. It starred Stanley Baxter as Mr. Majeika. The stories have also been broadcast on radio.

The first volume, Mr Majeika, was published in 1984 and was followed by Mr Majeika and the Music Teacher, Mr Majeika and the Haunted Hotel and The TV Adventures of Mr Majeika.

== Plot ==
The focus of these stories is Mr. Majeika, a teacher at St Barty's Primary School. He is a wizard, as is apparent when he flies into Class Three's boring lesson on a magic carpet, which he then turns into a bicycle, confounding the headmaster.

He entertains them with magical trickery which bring lessons to life, whether it is providing chips during dinner for all the children, or turning the nasty Hamish Bigmore into a frog for his insolence. Whatever the consequences, Class Three students are sure that with Mr. Majeika around, they will not be bored again. A recurring character is Wilhelmina Worlock, a witch who first appeared as a music teacher and has turned up regularly since in various disguises.

In the television series, Mr. Majeika is an irrepressible wizard sent to "Britland" from the planet Walpurgis because he failed his O-level sorcery exam for the seventeenth time. He drops into the sleepy village of Much Barty, finding a post at St Barty's School as Class Three's new form-teacher, where he quickly befriends two of the children: Melanie Brace-Girdle and Thomas Grey. Both of these characters are also in the books, but Melanie is a much less important and very different type of character in the books, and is replaced by another character as female lead, Jody. Also in the books, Thomas has a twin brother called Pete.

Majeika enters into his magic with reluctance, however, because he is trying hard to behave himself on Earth, and because the Worshipful Wizard of Walpurgis is keeping an eye on him from above. All the same, trickery becomes more and more necessary, leading Majeika, Melanie and Thomas into some remarkable adventures. Their fun is despised, but usually prompted, by the horribly spoilt Hamish, a pupil so ghastly that his mere presence caused the resignation of the previous class teacher and frightened off the 79 applicants for the post. But one waggle of Mr. Majeika's oddly tufted grey hair is all that it takes for Bigmore to be put firmly in his place.

== Books in the series ==
Series numbering	Title	Publication date	Length	Notes
1	Mr Majeika	17 May 1984	96pp	First book in the series. Mr Majeika arrives at St Barty's school.
7	Mr Majeika and the Music Teacher	29 October 1987	96pp	First appearance of Wilhelmina Warlock.
8	Mr Majeika and the Haunted Hotel	27 October 1988	80pp	
5	Mr Majeika and the Dinner Lady	2 August 1990	96pp	
13	Mr Majeika and the School Play	6 August 1992	96pp	
11	Mr Majeika and the School Inspector	29 April 1993	96pp	
9	Mr Majeika and the School Book Week	5 August 1993	96pp	
15	Mr Majeika's Postbag	24 February 1994	128pp	Not part of the St Barty's continuity. A mix of stories and activities.
4	Mr Majeika and the Ghost Train	5 October 1995	96pp	
6	Mr Majeika and the School Caretaker	31 July 1997	96pp	
14	Mr Majeika Vanishes	30 July 1998	96pp	
2	Mr Majeika and the School Trip	29 April 1999	96pp	
10	Mr Majeika and the Internet	7 June 2001	96pp	
3	Mr Majeika and the Lost Spell Book	4 September 2003	96pp	
12	Mr Majeika Joins the Circus	2 February 2006	96pp	
	The TV Adventures of Mr Majeika	25 February 1988	144pp	
	More Television Adventures of Mr.Majeika	5 January 1989	176pp	Based on scripts by Jenny McDade.
	Further Television Adventures of Mr.Majeika	4 January 1990	128pp	Based on scripts by Jenny McDade.

== TV show ==
Mr Majeika
- Starring: Stanley Baxter
- Country of origin: United Kingdom
- Original language: English
- No. of episodes: 19, plus 1 hr special

Production
- Running time: 25 min
- Production company: TVS

Original release
- Network: ITV
- Release: 13 March 1988 – 14 February 1990

The comedy drama series was executive produced by Nigel Pickard. The series was written by Jenny McDade. Carpenter wrote the fourth book based on McDade's scripts, The Television Adventures of Mr Majeika. Three series of the programme were made, comprising twenty episodes in total. The first series had six episodes. The location for St. Barty's Primary School was Matfield House in Tonbridge, Kent.

Stanley Baxter stars as a wizard in Mr Majeika as the titular role. It was his debut appearance on a children's programme. His wife convinced him to take on the role after he expressed uneasiness about taking on the role. Baxter designed his character's suit, which Graham Keal of the Liverpool Daily Post described as a "strangely cut, tightly buttoned and stupendously loud tweed suit". Another suggestion he made was that a mystical lock of his character's hair quivers in anticipation of a magic spell.

The performers starring as students attending the Academy for the Sons and Daughters of Gentlefolk were Andrew Read, Claire Sawyer, and Simeon Pearl. The roles were their first in television.

=== Cast ===
- Stanley Baxter as Mr. Majeika
- Roland MacLeod as Dudley Potter
- Fidelis Morgan as Bunty Brace-Girdle
- Eve Ferret as Pam Bigmore
- Claire Sawyer as Melanie Brace-Girdle
- Miriam Margolyes as Wilhermina Warlock
- Simeon Pearl as Hamish Bigmore
- Richard Murdoch as Worshipful Wizard
- Andrew Read as Thomas Grey
- Adele Silva as Fenella Fudd
- Christopher Ellison as Ron Bigmore
- Sanjiv Madan as Prince
- Pat Coombs as Miss Flavia Jelley
- Vernon Dobtcheff as Wizard Marks
- Robin Driscoll as Sgt. Sevenoaks

=== Availability ===
There has been no commercial release of Mr Majeika on DVD in the UK. This is possibly due to ongoing rights issues after the production company, TVS, dropped out of the ITV network in 1992 and subsequently went through a number of take-overs. This problem affects the majority of the TVS programme archive as much of the original production paperwork and sales documentation has been lost during the intervening years. According to Kaleidoscope's TV Brain website, nine episodes of the series no longer exist in broadcast quality, although all but one of these is available on YouTube.

=== Reception ===
In a 2023 reflection about CITV, The Guardian's Stuart Heritage said lead actor Stanley Baxter was "at his most charming". He wrote, "Think Bewitched, but about an old man who could waggle his hair instead of a housewife who could scrunch up her nose and you're there."

== Stage production ==
A musical stage production of Mr Majeika was performed at the Shaw Theatre in 1993. In addition to writing and scoring the musical, Humphrey Carpenter was its co-director. The show featured 60 actors aged five to 18 and an orchestra with 20 performers. The Mushy Pea Theatre Company put on the show, which was staffed by volunteers.
