= The Stanley Baxter Show =

British TV comedy series (1963, 1967–1971)

- Genre: Comedy
- Written by: Ken Hoare
- Starring: Stanley Baxter
- Country of origin: United Kingdom
- Original language: English
- No. of series: 4
- No. of episodes: 23

Production
- Producers: David Bell; Roger Race; James Gilbert
- Production company: BBC

Original release
- Network: BBC One
- Release: 18 May 1963 – 19 February 1971

The Stanley Baxter Show is a British comedy television show which was originally broadcast on the BBC. The original series aired in 1963, with three more between 1967 and 1971. The show used a variety format featuring a mixture of sketches and musical performances. Baxter had originally made his name in Scottish comedy, before becoming known to a wider audience through his appearances on television programme On the Bright Side as well as several films.

The show featured Baxter performing impressions based on a number of famous film and television shows, frequently playing several roles in one scene. It also featured a recurring sketch called "Parliamo Glasgow" in which Baxter parodied the style of a foreign language course, with the Glaswegian dialect being explained to viewers.

Other performers who appeared on the show included Victor Carin, Denise Coffey, Joan Sims, Mary Millar, Hannah Gordon, Patrick Newell and Roy Kinnear, Peggy Ann Clifford.

Following the show Baxter moved to ITV where he starred in The Stanley Baxter Picture Show (1972–1975) which employed a similar format.

== Bibliography ==
- Barfe, Louis. Turned Out Nice Again: The Story of British Light Entertainment. Atlantic Books Ltd, 2013.
