= Lapping (magic) =

Set of techniques in magic

In the art of conjuring, lapping refers to a set of techniques whereby a performer seated at a table can secretly dispose of an item into their lap. A common lapping technique is to sweep an item into the lap while pretending to pick it off the tabletop.

== Conflicts ==
There are two issues with lapping: one must prepare the lap beforehand so that objects do not slip between the legs and retrieval of the lapped object(s).

== Features ==
Subtle uses of lapping, such as secret switches or disposing of secret devices, enable effects that would not otherwise be possible. Stand-up magicians, such as "table-hoppers" at restaurants, may need to use a Topit or other device to obtain a similar effect, due to their inability to lap. The magicians who utilize the trick of lapping are able to manipulate items on a surface to the edge. From there they can move the items so that it falls in their lap without the audience noticing.

== Notable magicians ==
The magician Slydini was particularly noted for his lapping technique, which relied heavily on subtle misdirections.
