= Stanley Baxter =

Scottish actor and comedian (1926–2025)

- Baxter in 1959
- Born: Stanley Livingstone Baxter; 24 May 1926; Glasgow, Scotland
- Died: 11 December 2025 (aged 99); London, England
- Occupations: Actor; comedian; impressionist; author
- Years active: 1930s–2020
- Television: The Stanley Baxter Show; The Stanley Baxter Picture Show; The Stanley Baxter Series; Mr Majeika
- Spouse: Moira Robertson (m. 1951; died 1997)
- Awards: BAFTA Award 1975 The Stanley Baxter Moving Picture Show – Light Entertainment Performance; Lifetime Achievement Award – British Comedy Awards 1997; Oldie Camper of the Year – Oldie of the Year Awards 2008

Stanley Livingstone Baxter (24 May 1926 – 11 December 2025) was a Scottish actor, comedian, impressionist and author. Baxter began his career as a child actor on the BBC and later became known for his British television comedy shows The Stanley Baxter Show, The Stanley Baxter Picture Show, The Stanley Baxter Series and Mr Majeika. Baxter also wrote a number of books set in Glasgow.

Baxter is widely regarded as one of the most influential figures in British comedy, particularly for his work in television variety and sketch shows throughout the 1960s, 1970s and 1980s. His television productions, characterised by elaborate one-off specials and a mastery of impersonation and physical comedy, drew audiences in excess of 14 million at their peak and were celebrated for their technical ambition and originality.

== Early life ==
The son of an insurance manager, Baxter was born in Glasgow, on 24 May 1926. He was educated at Hillhead High School, Glasgow, and schooled for the stage by his mother. He began his career as a child actor in the local edition of the BBC's Children's Hour. Following employment in mining as a Bevin Boy in World War II, he developed his performing skills further during his national service with the British Army's Combined Services Entertainment unit, working alongside comedy actor Kenneth Williams, actor Peter Vaughan, film director John Schlesinger and dramatist Peter Nichols, who used the experience as the basis for his play Privates on Parade.

== Career ==
=== Stage ===
After the war, Baxter returned to Glasgow taking to the stage for three years at Glasgow's Citizens' Theatre. In 1949, he appeared in The Tintock Cup. Following success on the radio with Jimmy Logan, Howard & Wyndham Ltd invited him to star in pantomime at the Theatre Royal in Glasgow followed by the Half Past Eight Shows, and their successors the Five Past Eight Shows at Glasgow's Alhambra Theatre. He moved to London to work in television in 1959. He was shortly back performing in Glasgow at the Alhambra with his On the Brighter Side show.

In 1969, Baxter performed in the original production of Joe Orton's then controversial farce What the Butler Saw at the Queen's Theatre in the West End with Sir Ralph Richardson, Coral Browne and Hayward Morse. Baxter nurtured the stage careers of Alyson McInnes and John Ramage. He starred in pantomime over many years along with other Scottish performers, such as Jimmy Logan, Ronnie Corbett and Lonnie Donegan. Baxter remained a great favourite on the Scottish pantomime circuit, especially at the King's Theatre, Glasgow, until his retirement in 1992.

=== Radio ===
During the 1960s, Baxter had his own show on BBC Radio Scotland. In 1994, he returned to radio, taking the role of Noël Coward in the BBC World Service Play of the Week, Marvellous Party directed by Neil Cargill. Written by Jon Wynne-Tyson, it also starred Dorothy Tutin as Coward's lifelong friend, Esme Wynne-Tyson (Jon's mother). Also with Cargill, he read Whisky Galore and Jimmy Swan – The Joy Traveller for BBC Radio, providing the voices of all the characters.

After a lengthy spell in self-imposed retirement, Baxter appeared in 2004 in a series of four half-hour radio sitcoms for BBC Radio 4, entitled Stanley Baxter and Friends; the success of this led to further series entitled The Stanley Baxter Playhouse in 2006, 2008, 2009, 2010, 2013, 2014 and 2016, and Two Pipe Problems with Richard Briers in 2008, 2009 and 2010. Two further plays in this series were broadcast in 2013 with Geoffrey Palmer taking the Richard Briers role. In 2009, Eddie Izzard presented The Stanley Baxter Story on BBC Radio 2. A further series of Playhouse commenced airing on BBC Radio 4 in November 2018.

=== Television and entertainment ===
Baxter was known for his impressions of famous people, even appearing as 'the Duchess of Brendagh' - a character with a strong resemblance to The Queen. The Stanley Baxter Show ran between 1963 and 1971 on BBC One, and The Stanley Baxter Picture Show from 1972 to 1975 on ITV; the six-part Stanley Baxter Series was made by LWT in 1981. By 1983, it was reported that LWT could no longer afford to make Baxter's shows. In 1985, a return to the BBC was announced. Eight one-hour TV specials were made by LWT and the BBC between 1973 and 1986.

Baxter participated in one of the earliest broadcasts of the new ITV franchise, STV, when the station began transmissions on 31 August 1957. STV's inaugural programme, This Is Scotland, was a live variety-style light entertainment show designed to mark the launch of Scotland's first independent television channel. Baxter appeared in comedy segments alongside other established Scottish performers, including Jimmy Logan and the Glasgow Police Pipe Band, contributing to sketches drawn from his variety theatre experience. The programme is recognised as his first television production for STV and one of his earliest major television appearances outside his work with the BBC. The broadcast of This Is Scotland showcased a mixture of song, dance and comedy, framed around Scottish identity and entertainment. Baxter's involvement drew on his established stage reputation from the Glasgow variety circuit and helped introduce him to a broader Scottish television audience at the very beginning of STV's history.

Baxter guest-starred in an episode of The Goodies and later appeared in the lead role in Mr Majeika, developed from the books by Humphrey Carpenter, a children's show about a magic teacher, expelled from Walpurgis (the wizard land) for failing his professional examinations. He later stated that he had wanted to retire after his spectacular hour-long shows had been cancelled and that the move to children's television was a "purely financial" arrangement.

In Bing Crosby's final Christmas special, taped for CBS in the UK just a few weeks before Crosby's death in 1977, Baxter played multiple roles, including a butler, cook and – in one skit opposite a cracking-up Crosby – the ghost of Bob Hope's court jester ancestor. Having retired in 1990, Baxter returned for a one-off Christmas 2008 special for ITV, containing a mix of archived and new material, with celebrity comedians commenting on Baxter's influence on their lives and careers.

=== Film ===
Baxter appeared in a number of films, including Geordie (1955), Very Important Person (1961), The Fast Lady (1962), Crooks Anonymous (1962) and Father Came Too! (1963), the last four alongside James Robertson Justice, together with the animation The Thief and the Cobbler (1995). Baxter had a sporadic but notable film career that ran alongside his far more extensive work in radio, theatre and television. Although best known for his television variety and sketch shows, Baxter appeared in a number of British feature films from the 1950s through the 1960s and contributed voice work to later animated projects.

Baxter's first substantial screen role came in the mid-1950s with the comedy Geordie (1955), after which he returned to cinema work in the early 1960s in a string of comedies produced by Rank and independent companies. He appeared in Very Important Person (1961), The Fast Lady (1962), Crooks Anonymous (1962) and Father Came Too! (1963), frequently sharing the screen with established character actors of the period and often cast in comic supporting roles that showcased his facility for dialect, impersonation and physical comedy. Baxter worked with directors such as Ken Annakin and appeared alongside leading comedy performers of the era; his film roles typically complemented rather than eclipsed his television persona. Reviewers and later obituaries noted that Baxter's film appearances allowed him to translate many of his radio and stage skills into screen comedy, but that he remained primarily a performer for television and live theatre.

Later and posthumous credits include voice contribution to the long-running animated project The Thief and the Cobbler (worked on at various times and released in several versions; Baxter is credited on later release materials), demonstrating the occasional return to film animation projects decades after his principal screen period. Though Baxter's film résumé is modest compared with his television output, the roles he took on reveal a throughline with his broader comic practice: a mastery of impersonation, an ear for regional dialects (most famously his "Parliamo Glasgow" routines) and an eye for visual and character gags. Film historians and obituarists have written that his screen work remains of interest chiefly because it captures a performer at ease translating stage and radio techniques for the cinema of the era.

=== Books and literature ===
Baxter wrote a number of books based on the language of Glasgow, as developed in his Parliamo Glasgow sketch, and on the humour of the city;

- Bedside Book of Glasgow Humour ISBN 978-0094672703, may be same as ISBN 978-1841582467
- Parliamo Glasgow Omnibus ISBN 978-1841587745 and ISBN 978-1874744009
- Let's Parliamo Glasgow Again – Merrorapattur ISBN 978-0862280734
- Stanley Baxter's Suburban Shocker : Featuring Rosemary Morningside and the Garrulous Glaswegian Mr. Ballhead

== Legacy ==
Baxter's performances were notable for their wide range of characterisations and bold impersonations, including portrayals of figures such as the Pope and Queen Elizabeth II, as well as his comedic deconstructions of Glaswegian dialect in routines such as "Parliamo Glasgow". These sketches not only entertained but also helped broaden the scope of televised comedy in the United Kingdom.

Peers and subsequent generations of performers have cited Baxter as a major influence; contemporaries described him as a "giant of Scottish entertainment", and tributes from actors and comedians highlighted his ingenuity, warmth and the inspirational quality of his work. First Minister of Scotland, John Swinney, among others, said that Baxter brought "incredible joy to generations" of audiences.

In addition to his television influence, Baxter's legacy extends to theatre and pantomime where he was a beloved regular, as well as to radio and film, where his wide-ranging talents were on display across multiple media. He received numerous honours for his contributions to entertainment, including a lifetime achievement award at the British Comedy Awards and the BAFTA Scotland Outstanding Contribution to Film and Television Award, reflecting his long-lasting impact on the industry.

Baxter's blend of high production values, technical ingenuity and character versatility remains influential in British comedy. His work is widely studied and remembered through retrospectives, archive releases. The BBC Scotland documentary Being Stanley Baxter, is intended to explore his life, career and enduring appeal.

== Personal life and death ==
Baxter was brought up in the West End of Glasgow, in a tenement. He lived there from the age of five until he married actress Moira Robertson at 26 years of age. He later lived in Highgate, North London. He was married for 46 years until his wife's death of an overdose in 1997. He was overseas at the time.

In August 2014, Baxter was one of 200 public figures who were signatories to a letter to The Guardian expressing their hope that Scotland would vote to remain part of the United Kingdom in September's referendum on that issue.

In August 2020, Baxter came out as gay, following the release of his authorised biography. His biography described how Baxter had told Moira that he was gay before they married, with Baxter having sought to end their relationship as a result, but that she had threatened suicide, causing him to relent. Moira accepted that he was gay and allowed him to bring men home for sex, despite homosexual acts being illegal in England and Wales until the passing of the Sexual Offences Act 1967, 16 years after their marriage. Five years before then, Baxter had been arrested for cottaging and contemplated suicide for fear of scandal causing an end to his career. The soliciting charges were subsequently dropped.

Baxter sought to maintain the secrecy around his sexual orientation, with his biography describing how he had been concerned about the publication of Kenneth Williams' diaries as Williams was a close and long-time friend. In his biography, Baxter describes his discomfort with his homosexuality: "Anybody would be insane to choose to live such a very difficult life. There are many gay people these days who are fairly comfortable with their sexuality, fairly happy with who they are. I'm not. I never wanted to be gay. I still don't."

Baxter died on 11 December 2025, aged 99, at Denville Hall where he had been resident from 2023.

In a special ceremony, Baxter's ashes were scattered in a flower garden in Glasgow Botanic Gardens. Amongst those in attendance were former King's Theatre manager Billy Differ and Baxter's biographer Brian Beacom. A commemorative plaque was placed on a rowan tree.

== Awards and honours ==
Year	Award or honour	Category	Work	Result
1960	British Academy Television Award	Light Entertainment Artist	—	Won
1975	British Academy Television Award	Light Entertainment Performance	The Stanley Baxter Moving Picture Show	Won
1997	British Comedy Awards	Lifetime Achievement Award	—	Won
2008	Oldie of the Year Awards	Oldie Camper of the Year	—	Won
2020	BAFTA Scotland	Outstanding Contribution	—	Won

Baxter was offered an OBE, but declined it.

== DVD releases ==
All six of Baxter's hour-long ITV specials were released on a two-disc DVD set in 2005 as The Stanley Baxter Collection with a further two-disc DVD set being released in 2006 under the title The Stanley Baxter Series & Picture Show featuring both of his series of half-hour shows for ITV. In 2008 a five-disc DVD box set was released titled The Stanley Baxter Television Set. The set includes both half-hour ITV series that Baxter made for ITV and six of his ITV specials. It also includes two of the feature films he made with James Robertson Justice The Fast Lady and Father Came Too!.

== List of film and television appearances ==
Baxter had a range of film and television credits.

=== Stanley Baxter television series ===
- The Stanley Baxter Show (BBC, 22 x 30-minutes, 1963–71)
- Baxter On... (BBC, 1964)
- Time For Baxter (BBC Scotland, 1972)
- The Stanley Baxter Picture Show (LWT – four x 30-minutes, 1972)
- The Stanley Baxter Series (LWT – six x 30-minutes, 1981)

=== Stanley Baxter television specials ===
- The Stanley Baxter Big Picture Show (LWT – 21 December 1973)
- The Stanley Baxter Scots Picture Show (STV – 1 January 1974)
- The Stanley Baxter Moving Picture Show (LWT – 7 September 1974)
- The Best of Baxter (LWT – 14 December 1974)
- The Stanley Baxter Show Part III (LWT – 19 September 1975)
- Stanley Baxter's Christmas Box (LWT – 26 December 1976)
- Stanley Baxter's Greatest Hits (LWT – 26 December 1977)
- Stanley Baxter on Television (LWT – 1 April 1979)
- The Stanley Baxter Hour (LWT – 24 December 1982)
- Stanley Baxter's Christmas Hamper (BBC, 1985)
- Stanley Baxter's Picture Annual (BBC, 1986)
- Stanley Baxter is Back (C4, 1995)
- Stanley Baxter in Reel Terms (C4, 1996)
- Stanley Baxter in Person (Carlton, 1998)
- Stanley Baxter Now and Then (ITV, 2008)

=== Other television appearances ===
- Shop Window (BBC, 1952)
- This is Scotland (STV, 1957)
- On The Bright Side (BBC, 1960)
- Comedy Playhouse: "Lunch in the Park" (BBC, 1961)
- Espionage (BBC, 1963 Guest Appearance)
- Wednesday Play: "The Confidence Course" (BBC, 1965)
- Christmas Night with the Stars (BBC, 1970, Guest Appearance)
- The Goodies (BBC, 1971 Guest Appearance)
- A Grand Tour (STV, 1974)
- Bing Crosby's Merrie Olde Christmas (CBS/ITC Entertainment, 1977 Guest Appearances as multiple characters)
- Mr Majeika (Television South, 1988–90, Title Role)
- Rab C. Nesbitt (BBC, 1991, Guest Appearance)
- Arabian Knight (Animation, 1995, Voice Only)
- Meeow! (Animation, 2000, Voice Only)
- The Unforgettable...Kenneth Williams (Carlton, 2001, Interviewee)
- The Sketch Show Story (BBC, 2001, Interviewee)
- EX:SThis is Stanley Baxter (BBC, 2001 75th Birthday Documentary)
- Return of the Goodies (BBC, 2005, Interviewee)
- The Story of Light Entertainment (BBC, 2006, Interviewee)
- Comedy Map of Britain (BBC, 2007, Interviewee)
- Happy Birthday BAFTA (2007, Guest)
- The Comedy Christmas (2007, Interviewee)
- Artwork Scotland:When Alan Cumming met Stanley Baxter (2010)
- The Many Faces of Stanley Baxter (2013)
- Scottish Television Hogmanay shows (1980s and 1990s)
- The Undiscovered Kenneth Williams (Associated-Rediffusion/Sky Arts, 2018, Interviewee)
- Comedy National Treasures: Stanley Baxter (Associated-Rediffusion/Channel 5, 2019, Subject/Interviewee)

=== Films ===
- Geordie (Film, 1955)
- Very Important Person (Rank, 1961)
- Crooks Anonymous (Film, 1962)
- The Fast Lady (Film, 1962)
- Father Came Too! (Rank, 1963)
- Joey Boy (Film, 1965)
- The Thief and the Cobbler (Animation, Voice Only, 1993)
