= Wayne Dobson =

English magician (1957–2025)

Wayne Dobson (5 July 1957 – 7 July 2025) was an English magician, who became well known through various television appearances in the late 1980s and 1990s. At the height of his fame, he had his own television series Wayne Dobson – A Kind of Magic. He became known as a campaigner for multiple sclerosis charities.

== Early life and magic career ==
Dobson was born in Blaby, near Leicester and developed an interest in magic at an early age. He attributed the start of this interest to experiences including seeing an entertainer at a children's party and watching television programmes such as the David Nixon show. When he was nine his parents gave him a David Nixon Magic set as a Christmas present and thereafter, he became a dedicated performer always seeking to learn new tricks. During a school trip to London to visit the British Museum, he stumbled upon the Davenports magic shop, to which he would return often during his teens as he sought to learn more about professional magic. At Davenports, he met magician Pat Page who became a mentor and lifelong friend. Other influences cited by Dobson include Roy Johnson, Ken Brooke and Dai Vernon, who was revered among magicians for his close-up magic.

At the age of 16, Dobson became the youngest ever member of the Leicester Magic Circle. He also started to pick up work on a semi-professional basis at local clubs. In 1977, he won joint first prize in the close-up competition at the International Brotherhood of Magicians British Ring Convention. This led to his television debut on the BBC Television show Blue Peter. Encouraged by this success Dobson decided at the age of 21 to become a full-time professional magician.

Dobson had developed a style of magic based around fast-talking patter and one-liner humour. It won him work as an opening act on tours with top UK performers such as Freddie Starr, Dame Shirley Bassey and the Shadows. He also began getting guest slots on television shows. In 1988, he was hired as a support act for Engelbert Humperdinck on a tour of America.

Back in the UK, he was asked to perform in the 1989 Royal Variety Show at the London Palladium, where he scored a great success with an act in which he was assisted by boxer Frank Bruno and sports commentator Harry Carpenter. Later that year, he made regular guest appearances on the Joe Longthorne television show. This led to him being offered his own TV series called Wayne Dobson – A Kind of Magic, featuring Linda Lusardi as his assistant. The series was aired nationally in the early 1990s on ITV, and reached audiences of 11 million. In total, three series were commissioned by ITV, with a special called Wayne Dobson Close-up being produced by Celador for post-1992 London franchise owner Carlton in 1995.

== Later career ==
Having reduced his performing work because of the advance of his MS, Dobson continued with a career in magic. He worked as a lecturer at societies and conferences. He ran DTRIK, a business developing and marketing magic tricks. In 2018, he was interviewed by BBC Studios for their TV countdown series Top of the Box, which was commissioned by Channel 5 and shown on the channel under a number of titles including Greatest TV Moments of the 1980s. He appeared in the 1989 episode on 27 May 2018, talking about The Royal Variety Performance, his own television special and health issues.

In 2022, Dobson announced his return to live performance with a new theatre show at Haslemere Hall in Surrey.

== Personal life and death ==
Dobson was diagnosed with multiple sclerosis (MS) in 1988. He became an ambassador for the Multiple Sclerosis Resource Centre (MSRC) charity.

Dobson died from complications of MS on 7 July 2025, at the age of 68.

== Awards and honors ==
Year	Organization	Award	Ref.
1998	The British Magical Society	David Berglas Award	
2016	The Magic Circle	The Maskelyne Award	
	The British Magical Society	Honorary Vice President	
	The Magical Circle	Honorary Vice President	
