= Once Upon a Time in Space =

2026 documentary series

- Genre: Documentary
- Directed by: James Bluemel
- No. of seasons: 1
- No. of episodes: 4

Original release
- Network: BBC
- Release: October 27, 2025
- Network: PBS
- Release: July 14, 2026

Once Upon a Time in Space is a 2026 four-part PBS and BBC series discussing the history of human spaceflight, from the Space Shuttle era to modern day. It focuses largely on the relationship between Russia and the United States during that time. The show touches on the Space Shuttle program, the Mir space station, the building of the International Space Station, and the rise of commercial spaceflight. The story also discusses the impact of geopolitics, racism, and sexism on human spaceflight. It is directed by James Bluemel and includes interviews and footage of astronauts, cosmonauts, NASA employees, and family members.

== Cast ==
The cast includes:

Astronauts:

- Charlie Bolden
- Anna Lee Fisher
- Bill Fisher
- Michael Foale
- Jerry Linenger
- Mike Mullane
- Dan Tani
- Terry Virts

Cosmonauts:

- Sergei Zalyotin
- Sasha Lazutkin

Others:

- Ginger Kerrick, former NASA flight director
- Carl McNair, brother of American astronaut Ronald McNair, who was killed in the Challenger accident
- Robert Opel, rocket enthusiast

== Episodes ==
List of episodes of Once Upon a Time in Space
No. in season	Title	Original release date
1	"America First"	July 14, 2026
This episode focuses on the beginning of the Space Shuttle program in the United States. The Space Shuttle program brings in a more diverse selection of astronauts, including women and people of color. Ron McNair, who grew up under segregation, becomes one of the first Black astronauts in space. Anna Fisher, the first mother in space, faces public scrutiny and conflicting emotions over going to space and leaving her toddler daughter behind. Mike Mullane, a Vietnam War veteran and astronaut, is initially skeptical of the ability of women and civilians to become astronauts, but changes his mind after training with them. In 1986, the space shuttle Challenger explodes, killing all seven astronauts onboard, including McNair. Meanwhile, while space shuttles are grounded in the wake of the disaster, the Soviet Union successfully launches into orbit the first space station, Mir.
2	"The Russian Thing"	July 21, 2026
After the fall of the Soviet Union, Russia is struggling to keep their space program going. The United States is concerned that Russia's rocket scientists, many of whom were also involved in its nuclear program, will go to other countries and share their nuclear knowledge. Because of this, the United States proposes Shuttle–Mir, a program to send US astronauts to the Mir space station. Astronaut Jerry Linenger travels to Russia for training and meets Sasha Lazutkin; the two are eventually sent to Mir together. While on Mir, a fire caused by an air filter problem and a collision with an uncrewed cargo ship threaten the lives of the crew. Although it is deduced that these accidents were due to equipment failure or unavoidable flukes, after landing back on Russian soil, the cosmonauts face accusations of having damaged the station themselves. Ultimately, after many years, the cosmonauts do receive awards and recognition by the Russian government for their work in space.
3	"Politics Always Wins"	July 28, 2026
In 1996, NASA unveils its newest, largest-ever class of astronauts, who will be tasked with building the International Space Station. To lower the costs to the United States, NASA has other countries, including Russia, build and finance parts of the ISS. The financial demands of the ISS burden Russia, who is struggling to find additional funding for Mir. Millionaire Walt Anderson becomes interested in Mir and founds MirCorp, a commercial spaceflight operation that will help fund Mir in exchange for sending commercial astronauts to space. Cosmonaut Sergei Zalyotin is sent to the now-uncrewed Mir to assess its condition and determines it to be in an operational, fixable state. However, Russia, behind on both building and funding the ISS, is under increasing pressure from the United States to focus its efforts on the ISS. In 2001, a few months after the first ISS crew had taken up residence, Mir is deorbited.
4	"Friends Forever"	August 4, 2026
The building of the ISS is finally completed, marking the end of the US space shuttle program. NASA flight director and CAPCOM Ginger Kerrick is concerned about the United States' newfound inability to get to space on their own; their only option now is to pay Russia to use the Soyuz. In 2014, while astronaut Terry Virts is on the ISS, Russia annexes Crimea and Virts sees bombs exploding in Ukraine from space. He becomes concerned about how geopolitics and the ever-tenser Russia-US relationship will affect the space program, and has trouble making close relationships with the cosmonauts on the station. This issue only intensifies after Russia invades Ukraine in 2022. The Americans are concerned about Russia's actions, while the Russian cosmonauts believe that it should not interfere with the space program. Meanwhile, commercial spaceflight companies, particularly SpaceX, are finally becoming ready to carry human passengers. The US regains its ability to fly itself into space with the launch of the Crew Dragon. Virts and Kerrick speculate on the future of the Russia-US relationship in spaceflight, particularly after the deorbit of the ISS.

== Production ==
Bluemel focused on emphasizing the human and emotional aspect of the story; he felt that astronauts are often perceived as "superhuman", and wanted to see a more vulnerable side of them. He also wanted to include the Russian side of the story just as much as the American side in this aspect—both the American astronauts and the Russian cosmonauts discuss the impact of their spaceflights on their domestic lives, and their families are interviewed.

Bluemel noted that getting the cosmonauts to interview was one of the biggest challenges he faced on the project. The ongoing Russo-Ukrainian war and Russia-United States relations made it difficult to get cosmonauts to agree and to find a way that they could interview. Ultimately, the production team and the Russian cosmonauts met in a neutral country to interview.

== Reception ==
Jack Seale of The Guardian gave Once Upon a Time in Space a 4/5 star review, calling Bluemel's focus on interviews "a technique more radical than it sounds". Seale also noted that the series was "restrained and domestic", rather than "expansive and majestic" as one might expect from a documentary about space.
