= David Bell (television executive) =

Scottish television producer (1936–1990)

- Born: 29 June 1936; Selkirk, Scotland
- Died: 9 June 1990 (aged 53); London, England
- Occupations: Television Producer and BBC Scotland Head of Entertainment

David Bell (29 June 1936 – 9 June 1990) was a Scottish television producer and director in the light entertainment genre. In the mid-1980s, he became head of light entertainment at LWT. Live From Her Majesty's, Copy Cats and The Stanley Baxter Show number amongst his successes.

== Career ==
In 1978, Bell was involved with Michael Grade's move bringing Bruce Forsyth to ITV to present a Saturday night spectacular. On the back of his mammoth success with Bruce Forsyth's Big Night, he was never settled with ITV's two-hour multi-format evening of glitz, mini-soaps, game shows, and gags. None of which was for want of trying by David Bell, whose biting wit and flair meant he enjoyed the respect of all in his production team.

He worked with several prominent personalities in television, such as Dame Edna Everage, Bruce Forsyth, Benny Hill, and Elton John.

== Death ==
Following an illness that lasted for several months, Bell died at his home in London in June 1990, aged 53.
