= Pat Page (magician) =

Scottish magician (1929–2010)

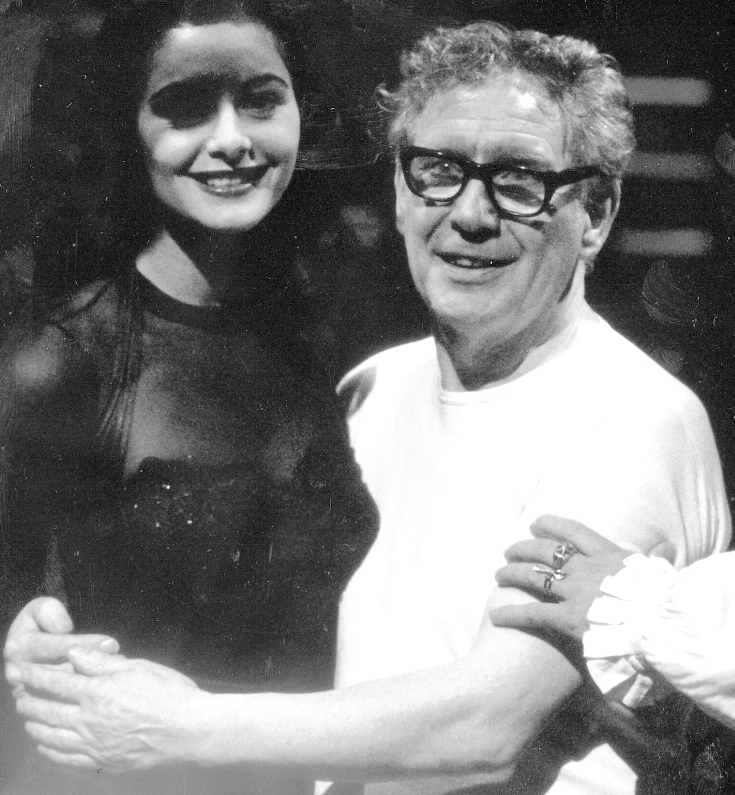
- Page (right) working on TV series The Secret Cabaret
- Born: Patrick Page; 17 March 1929; Dundee, Scotland
- Died: 11 February 2010 (aged 80)
- Occupation: Magic Entertainer
- Parent(s): Patrick Page & Jane Stevenson (Page)

Patrick "Pat" Page (17 March 1929 – 11 February 2010) was a stage magician born in Dundee, Scotland. He became a professional magician at the age of 26 and worked at Davenport's magic shop for fifteen years. In 1950, he married Margaret Manzie, who died in 2003. Pat was the youngest of six siblings. He left behind his daughter Janette, son Jeremy and Grandson Robert.

He appeared on The Paul Daniels Magic Show and was an uncredited consultant to the film Casino Royale. He worked as an advisor to Derren Brown and contributed to the children's magic show Wizbit. He appeared in, or advised films and television shows: the 2007 film Magicians, Agatha Christie Poirot:The Disappearance of Mr. Davenheim (1990), Heroes of Magic (2000), Tales of the Unexpected: Season 5, Episode 5 Stranger in Town (23 May 1982), Derren Brown Presents the 3D Magic Spectacular (2009).

On his death Jack Delvin, president of The Magic Circle described him as the "magician's magician". Magician Wayne Dobson described him as a "great friend, mentor and magical adviser". Other magicians affirm Page's skills and legacy.

Page is known for his work on numerous magic tricks, including the Topit, Easy Money, The Miser's Dream and The Kitson Miracle.

Page also did "master classes" at a local venue in Holborn London (it was recently found out from several Magic circle members)

In addition to inventing magic tricks, he published books and DVDs and advised professional magicians. Many of his routines are used by professional magicians including Doug Henning, Fred Kaps and Rafael Benatar. He wrote various books, including The Big Book of Magic and published articles in the magician's magazine Pabular.

== Topit ==
The Topit was popularised by Page. It is a utility item (a type of hidden pouch) that is used by a magician to conceal items or make them appear to vanish.

== Easy money ==
This trick was invented by Page. The effect is that blank pieces of paper are shown, the blank paper then appears to turn into paper money. This is a type of Bill Switch published as a DVD and in the book Magic Page by Page. Easy Money has been re-released by Greg Wilson, in the DVD Wilson attributes his method to Page.

== Publications ==
- Topit (1966)
- Bell's Magic Book (1973) ISBN 051712632X
- The Big Book of Magic (1976) ISBN 0722166648
- Magic by Gosh: The Life and Times of Albert Goshman (1985) ISBN 0961549203
- The Pull Book (1987)
- Card Games and Tricks ISBN 0356063445
- The Joker's Handbook ISBN 0356063399
- Magic ISBN 0843137312
- Magic Funstation ISBN 1872700233
- Tricks with Cards ISBN 0723405751
- Tricks with Coins ISBN 0723405743
- Tricks with Handkerchiefs ISBN 0723405778
- Tricks with Paper ISBN 072340576X
- The Pageboy Speaks Again
- Miser's Dream Book
- The page boy speaks
- Patrick Page lecture notes (blue)
- Patrick Page's book of visual comedy
- How to entertain children with a glove puppet
- Magic Page By Page

== DVDS ==
- Secret Seminar of Magic with Patrick Page Vol 1
- Secret Seminar of Magic with Patrick Page Vol 2
- Secret Seminar of Magic with Patrick Page Vol 3
- Secret Seminar of Magic with Patrick Page Vol 4
- Secret Seminar of Magic with Patrick Page Vol 5
- Secret Seminar of Magic with Patrick Page Vol 6
- Secret Seminars of Magic with Patrick Page : Rope Magic / Magic with Paper Volume 4
