= Channel 4's Comedy Gala (2011 TV program) =

- Season 4
- Starring: Alan Carr; Andi Osho; Chris Moyles; Dara Ó Briain; Jack Dee; Jack Whitehall; Jo Brand; John Bishop; Jon Richardson; Jonathan Ross; Kevin Bridges; Lee Evans; Mark Watson; Michael McIntyre; Micky Flanagan; Paul Kaye; Rhod Gilbert; Rich Hall; Sarah Millican; Sean Lock; Shappi Khorsandi
- No. of episodes: 1

Release
- Original network: Channel 4
- Original release: 10 June 2011

Season chronology
- ← Previous; 2010 Next → 2012

Channel 4's Comedy Gala of 2011 is a British comedy benefit show organised by Channel 4. It is the second Channel 4 Comedy Gala, an annual charity event held O2 Arena in London in aid of the Great Ormond Street Children's Hospital. It was filmed live on 24 May 2011, then broadcast on Channel 4 on 10 June 2011. The first Comedy Gala was held 30 March 2010 and broadcast on 5 April 2010. Billed by Channel 4 as "the biggest live stand up show in UK history", it featured seventeen comedians performing stand-up, as well as a number of others performing live and pre-recorded sketches. The first gala raised money for a new anaesthetic room, while the second aims to raise money for a new operating theatre.

== Beneficiary ==
As with the 2010 gala, the 2011 performance was in aid of the Great Ormond Street Children's Hospital. The 2011 proceeds were to go towards funding a new 24-hour operating theatre, costing £5 million. The new theatre would reduce waiting times at the hospital for the children treated from across the UK with life-saving heart, brain and spinal surgery. As with the 2010 show, the performers were to give their time for free for the gala.

== History ==
On 10 March 2011, Michael McIntyre and John Bishop visited a cardiac ward of the hospital with the Daily Mirror, who announced a second comedy gala at the O2 in aid of the hospital was to be held on 24 May 2011. To be filmed and broadcast on Channel 4 at a later date, tickets were due to go on sale the next day, at 9 am. Channel 4 confirmed this with an announcement on its Comedy Gala website the next day. While tickets went on general sale that day at 9 am, a pre-sale begun at 9 am the day before.

As with the 2010 gala, the 2011 show was commissioned by the Channel 4 commissioning editor Syeda Irtizaali, the promoter was Off the Kerb Productions and it was to be filmed by Open Mike Productions.

The gig at the O2 was to open at 6.30 pm.

== Participants ==
When the second gala was announced, the confirmed line-up included the following performers:

- Alan Carr
- Andi Osho
- Chris Moyles
- Dara Ó Briain
- Jack Dee
- Jack Whitehall
- Jo Brand
- John Bishop
- Jon Richardson
- Jonathan Ross
- Kevin Bridges
- Lee Evans
- Mark Watson
- Michael McIntyre
- Micky Flanagan
- Paul Kaye
- Rhod Gilbert
- Rich Hall
- Sarah Millican
- Sean Lock
- Shappi Khorsandi

Promoters Off the Kerb also listed the following acts:

- Jason Byrne
- Jason Manford
- Noel Fielding
- N-Dubz

Video Appearances listed by the following:

- Russell Brand
- Lady Gaga

== DVD ==
As with the 2010 show, the filming of the 2011 was to have a DVD release by Universal Pictures.

== See also ==
- 2011 in British television
- List of stand-up comedians
