= Addison Cresswell =

British talent agent (1960–2013)

- Born: Addison Cresswell; 28 June 1960; Brighton, East Sussex, England
- Died: 23 December 2013 (aged 53); London, England
- Resting place: Highgate Cemetery, London
- Occupations: Talent agent and producer
- Spouse: Shelly Cresswell (?–2013; his death)

Addison Cresswell (28 June 1960 – 23 December 2013) was a British comedy talent agent and producer.

He was notable for finding many stand-up "alternative" comedians at the Edinburgh Festival Fringe and at other venues, promoting them and finding spots for them on television and radio over a 30-year period from the 1980s. He has been called "one of the most influential people in British comedy", "arguably the most powerful man in UK comedy" for two decades and "the Darth Vader of the Fringe".

== Early life ==
Cresswell was born in Brighton, East Sussex. His father, Peter Cresswell, was the dean of arts at Goldsmiths College, University of London. His younger brother, Luke, became a founder of the dance and percussion group Stomp. He was educated at St Luke's Primary School (Brighton), Longhill High School (Rottingdean), and Brighton Polytechnic, where he studied graphic design and was the student entertainments officer.

As Entertainments Officer at Brighton Polytechnic, he booked bands such as U2, Killing Joke, Joy Division, New Order and Madness. He was able to live off the money he made.

== Career ==
He first visited the Edinburgh Fringe in 1982 with Tony Allen.

He founded 'The Comedy Boom' with club promoter and comedian Ivor Dembina (who he'd viewed as a rival) in Edinburgh in 1987. It was the Edinburgh Festival Fringe's first venue for stand-up comedy. They found the venue - the Abercraig Lounge - simply by walking round Edinburgh. The landlord was initially sceptical, but they persuaded him to show them the basement function room and knew it was going to work.

The performance poet and comedian John Hegley was Cresswell's first client. He founded a production company called Wonderdog with Paul Merton and Julian Clary who he had met at 'The Comedy Boom'. His client list went on to include: Sean Lock, Jon Richardson, Jonathan Ross, Lee Evans, Michael McIntyre, Alan Carr, Kevin Bridges and Rich Hall. He was behind Live at the Apollo, which was hosted for the first two series and the first episode of the third by Jack Dee, and Stand Up for the Week on Channel 4 Television from 2010.

He founded and ran the Off the Kerb talent agency in 1982 and in 1991 co-founded the independent TV and radio production company, Open Mike Productions, with comedian Jack Dee. He organised the Channel 4 Comedy Gala annually in support of Great Ormond Street Hospital. "He liked the idea of being a Svengali figure, like Brian Epstein with The Beatles," said Dembina, but "he wasn't a greedy person. And the thing people forget about Addison is what a brilliant designer he was. He created the most eye-catching posters".

He helped his client Jonathan Ross secure a BBC contract worth £18m. When Ross became involved in the Sachsgate controversy, and lost the prime-time TV slot, it was taken over by Live at the Apollo, a show produced by Cresswell's TV production company, which helped to launch another of Cresswell's clients, Michael McIntyre.

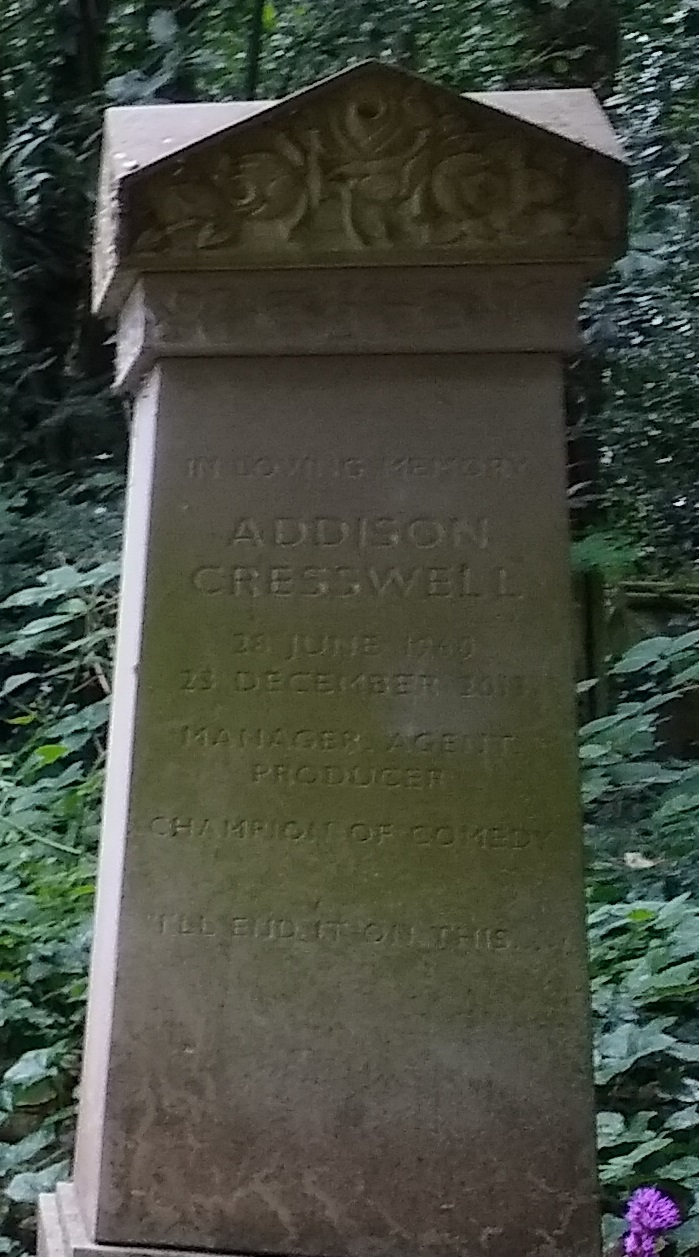
Grave of Addison Cresswell in Highgate Cemetery (West)

== Death ==
Cresswell died of a heart attack on 23 December 2013 at the age of 53; Cresswell is survived by his wife, Shelley.
