= Channel 4's Comedy Gala (2010 TV program) =

- Season 4
- Starring: Jo Brand; Bill Bailey; John Bishop; Kevin Bishop; Kevin Bridges; Alan Carr; James Corden; Jack Dee; Lee Evans; Noel Fielding; Ruth Jones; Rich Hall; Shappi Khorsandi; Patrick Kielty; Sean Lock; Stomp; Jason Manford; Michael McIntyre; David Mitchell; Andy Parsons; Mark Watson; Robert Webb; Jack Whitehall
- No. of episodes: 1

Release
- Original network: Channel 4
- Original release: 5 April 2010

Season chronology
- ← Previous — Next → 2011

Channel 4's Comedy Gala of 2010 was a British comedy benefit show organised by Channel 4. It was the inaugural Channel 4 Comedy Gala, an annual charity event held O2 Arena in London in aid of Great Ormond Street Children's Hospital. Filmed live on 30 March 2010, a two and a half-hour highlights show was broadcast on Channel 4 on 5 April 2010. Billed by Channel 4 as "the biggest live stand up show in UK history" it featured seventeen comedians performing stand-up, as well as a number of others performing live and pre-recorded sketches, to an audience of 16,000. It raised nearly £1 million to open a new anaesthetic room.

== Beneficiary ==
All profits from ticket and DVD sales of the Comedy Gala were to go to Great Ormond Street Hospital Children's Charity. All performers waived their fees for the show. The money was to be used towards the provision of two new anaesthetic rooms, allowing parents to remain with their children up until the time they enter the operating theatres.

Katie Price made an appearance at the gala, mentioning that her disabled son Harvey is a regular visitor to the hospital. At the end of the performance, Jack Dee presented Lee Evans with a Channel 4 lifetime achievement award, which he auctioned on the spot for £5,000 for the charity, selling it to a member of the audience. Evans told the audience of his personal connection to the hospital, through the loss of his brother's eight-year-old son. Jack Dee's son was also once a patient at the hospital.

The 2010 gala ultimately raised nearly £1 million, enough to open a new anaesthetic room.

== History ==
The Comedy Gala was commissioned by Channel 4 Entertainment commissioning editor, Syeda Irtizaali. Promoted by Off the Kerb Productions, it was to be filmed by Open Mike Productions.

14,000 tickets went on sale on 12 February 2010 for the live show at the O2 Arena, scheduled for 30 March 2010. 2,000 more tickets were released on 26 February. With over 25 performers taking part, Channel 4 promoted the show as "the biggest live stand up show in United Kingdom history", and "the comedy event of the year". All tickets for the show were sold in advance according to promoters Off the Kerb.

The live show was to be opened by Alan Carr, and would feature live stand-up from several comedians, with other artists contributing additional sketches and filmed inserts, in addition to celebrity appearances from the likes of Katie Price and Alex Reid, and Christine Bleakley, as well as musicals performances by Stomp and Bill Bailey. Channel 4 was to screen 2 hours of highlights from the show at 9pm on bank holiday Easter Monday, 5 April 2010. It was announced on 1 April that the Channel 4 broadcast would also feature a special advert break, with Jimmy Carr mocking a selection of willing advertisers.

The live-show went ahead, finishing at 11pm. The Channel 4 programme aired on 5 April, running for an extra 30 minutes over the advertised length. There was a hint at the second gala to come, when Jack Dee closed the first show stating "we'll see you next year, thank you and goodnight". A second gala was duly announced on 10 March 2011.

== Cast ==
=== Stand up performers ===
The following people appeared, performing live stand-up:

- Jo Brand
- Bill Bailey
- John Bishop
- Kevin Bridges
- Alan Carr
- Jack Dee
- Lee Evans
- Noel Fielding
- Rich Hall
- Shappi Khorsandi
- Patrick Kielty
- Sean Lock
- Jason Manford
- Michael McIntyre
- Andy Parsons
- Mark Watson
- Jack Whitehall

=== Other in person appearances ===
The following people also appeared live, either as hosts, special guests, or in sketches or musical performances:

- Christine Bleakley
- Rob Brydon
- Fonejacker
- James Corden
- Peter Dickson (voice)
- Kevin Eldon
- Ruth Jones
- David Mitchell
- Katie Price
- Alex Reid
- Jonathan Ross
- Stomp
- Catherine Tate
- Gok Wan

=== Pre-recorded appearances ===
The following people appeared during the live show in pre-recorded parts, either in special messages or sketches:

- Kevin Bishop
- Derren Brown
- Alan Carr
- Jimmy Carr
- Johnny Depp
- Ricky Gervais (voice)
- Kyle MacLachlan
- Stephen Merchant (voice)
- David Mitchell
- Sharon Osbourne
- Karl Pilkington (voice)
- Patrick Stewart
- Rihanna
- Gok Wan
- Robert Webb

=== Notes ===
Jo Brand performed despite suffering from norovirus. Omid Djalili was due to appear according to some Channel 4 publicity before the show, although he did not ultimately feature. Christine Bleakley, having appeared in her regular role as presenter of The One Show broadcast live from 7pm, ultimately took part in the show accompanying Fonejacker as a host, although she did not ultimately perform any stand-up.

== Show elements ==
The majority of the show was live stand-up, although it also included some musical performances and in-character performances.

=== Running order ===
Stand-up acts, sketches and other pre-recorded parts were broadcast in the Channel 4 show in the following order (minus hosts):

- Stomp
- Alan Carr
- Jason Manford
- Jo Brand
- Apology sketches

ad-break

- Sean Lock
- Short film about Great Ormond Street
- Special message from Johnny Depp
- Kevin Bridges

special ad break featuring Jimmy Carr

- Patrick Kielty
- Special message from The Ricky Gervais Show
- First The Kevin Bishop Show television sketch

ad-break

- Andy Parsons
- Mark Watson

ad-break

- Michael McIntyre
- Bill Bailey

ad-break

- Jack Dee
- Shappi Khorsandi
- Peep Show television sketch

ad-break

- Noel Fielding
- Gavin & Stacey live sketch
- John Bishop
- Jack Whitehall
- Rich Hall

ad-break

- Second The Kevin Bishop Show television sketch
- Lee Evans as 'The Lee Evans Trio'

ad-break

- Lee Evans's main act

=== Hosts and special guests ===
All the stand-up acts were given 4–5 minutes to perform, with longer performances from Michael McIntyre and Lee Evans. To gel the stand-up acts and sketches together, the show used several hosts presenting in turn, which split the show into different notional sections; as well as using special guests and in-character acts for other one-off introductions for other acts. Alan Carr and Jack Dee acted as both hosts and stand-up performers, while some other hosts had short 1 minute acts too.

Alan Carr was the first host, introducing Jason Manford, Jo Brand, the apology sketches and Sean Lock, before appearing in the short film about the hospital. Jonathan Ross then took over as host, introducing the message from Johnny Depp, then the acts by Kevin Bridges, the special ad-break, Patrick Kielty, and the special sketch by The Ricky Gervais Show. Rob Brydon and Gok Wan then introduced the first Kevin Bishop Show sketch and Andy Parsons, while Brydon then went on to do a short Tom Jones impression before then introducing Mark Watson. Michael McIntyre was introduced by the celebrity couple Katie Price and Alex Reid, while Fonejacker, appearing in character as 'Terry Tibbs' and accompanied by celebrity guest and BBC presenter Christine Bleakley, then introduced Jack Dee's act. Following his own act, Dee went on to introduce Shappi Khorsandi and the Peep Show sketch. Catherine Tate then appeared in character as Joanie Taylor ("Nan") from The Catherine Tate Show, to introduce Noel Fielding. The Gavin & Stacy sketch was not announced, while its characters Corden and Jones then introduced John Bishop. David Mitchell then took over as host, introducing Jack Whitehall, Rich Hall and the second Kevin Bishop Show sketch.

The hosts themselves were introduced by the voice of Peter Dickson, with the exception of David Mitchell who was introduced by the previous act, John Bishop. Dickson also introduced Bill Bailey and Lee Evans as the only other acts not introduced in person by somebody. For comedic effect, the start of the Gavin & Stacey sketch was not announced at all.

=== Other live acts ===
The show opened with a performance by the musical troupe Stomp who make music using plastic and metal bins and barrels, and oil drums. Alan Carr was then revealed to have been in one of their wheelie bins for the entire performance. Tipped out of the bin, he begins the stand-up show with his own act, before acting as host for the first segment.

Bill Bailey performed a short stand-up before going on to perform various musical comedy shorts on the keyboard, with additional vocals by Kevin Eldon.

James Corden and Ruth Jones appeared in character as Smithy and Nessa from their television sit-com Gavin & Stacey, carrying forward the plot from the final episode by pretending to be visiting London on a day trip from Barry Island. Lost and late, they appear on stage looking for their seats, before realising they're on stage and carrying on in character.

In 'The Lee Evans Trio', Lee Evans appears on his own, spotlighted in turn, miming playing three different instruments, drums, double bass and piano.

=== Pre-recorded sketches ===
Various performers provided special shorts of their television shows for the Gala. A special message from the animated show The Ricky Gervais Show featured the voices of Ricky Gervais, Stephen Merchant & Karl Pilkington in a sketch about giving to charity and swimming with dolphins. In the first The Kevin Bishop Show sketch, Bishop appears as 'Rok Wan' alongside Gok Wan as Gok's younger brother, for a make-over. In his second sketch, in a notional More4 programme 'Celebrity Siblings Reunited', Bishop appears as 'Darren Brown', meeting his twin brother Derren Brown on their birthday. In the Peep Show sketch, David Mitchell and Robert Webb perform a sketch in a restaurant about donating to charity.

Actors Sir Patrick Stewart and Johnny Depp, singer Rihanna, actor Kyle MacLachlan, celebrity Sharon Osbourne, all appeared during the show to give notional pre-recorded messages of apology for not being able to attend. However, these were all in fact comedy spoofs. Johnny Depp and Rihanna joked that Jonathan Ross was the reason they weren't appearing, Osbourne play-acted that she had been snubbed by Channel 4, while Stewart and MacLachlan sent-up the general idea of celebrities being less than committed to making appearances at charity galas.

Pitched by Carr as the 'serious bit' in the mould of Comic Relief type information films inserted between the comedy acts, the short film broadcast early in the show about the Great Ormond Street Hospital featured instead, Alan Carr touring the hospital meeting staff and patients, making various comic gaffes.

During the special ad-break featuring Jimmy Carr, Carr appeared either in specially filmed inserts, or in walkover shots, mocking adverts for Gocompare.com, Churchill car insurance, Specsavers, PokerStars.com, Kerry Low Low cheese and Guinness

== Reception ==
The live show was greeted with average to good reviews, with The Daily Telegraph and the London Evening Standard giving it 4 out of 5 stars, while The Times and The Independent gave it 3 stars. The length of the show and size of the arena were pointed out as detracting points. Michael McIntyre and Lee Evans were universally recognised as being the best acts of the show. Other noted acts were Jack Dee, John Bishop, Rich Hall, Noel Fielding, and a musical routine by Bill Bailey and Kevin Eldon. With McIntyre being closer of the first half, and Evans closing the show, they had both been given longer than the 5 minutes given to most acts, leading to observations that this meant the intervening acts had neither the time to die a death, or heat up the performance beyond being just enjoyable. The inclusion of Katie Price and Alex Reid was questioned; they were roundly booed by the audience. Media outlets picked up on Patrick Kielty and Sean Lock's inclusion of gags about Michael Jackson, who had been planning to stage his farewell concerts at the arena before his shock death nine months previously.

The Channel 4 broadcast on 5 April was to be the highlight of the Channel 4 Easter programming, going up against the Guardian's other Easter Monday TV highlight selections of the final ever episode of A Touch of Frost on ITV, and the UK premiere of the long-awaited series The Pacific, on Sky Movies. The broadcast ultimately came third in the terrestrial viewer ratings in its time slot. It registered 2.172 million viewers, a 9.9% audience share, between 9 pm and 11.05 pm, with a further 254,000 viewers watching on the timeshift service, Channel 4 +1. This was behind the 8.338 million viewers (34%) registered by A Touch of Frost, and the 4.321 million (16.1%) who watched MasterChef on BBC One. The Pacific registered 631,000 viewers on the digital-only channel Sky Movies.

== DVD release ==
An uncut version of the full 3-hour show was released on DVD by Universal Pictures on Monday 26 April 2010.

== See also ==
- 2010 in British television
- List of stand-up comedians
