= Kenny Mayne =

American sports media personality

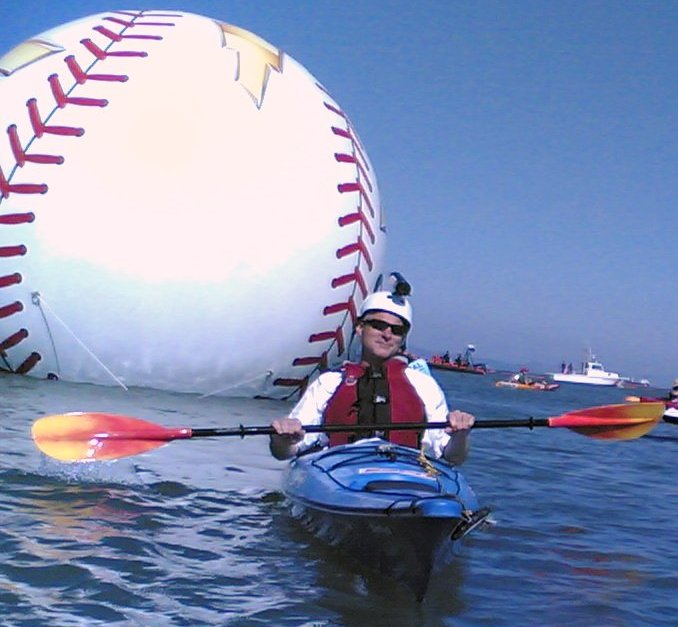
- Mayne in McCovey Cove in 2007
- Born: Kenneth Wheelock Mayne; 1959 or 1960 (age 66–67); Kent, Washington, U.S.
- Education: University of Nevada, Las Vegas
- Occupation: Sports broadcaster
- Years active: 1982–2021
- Employer: ESPN (1994–2021)

Kenneth Wheelock Mayne (born 1959 or 1960) is an American former sports media personality who is best known for his work on ESPN from 1994 to 2021. He appeared as host of Kenny Mayne's Wider World of Sports on ESPN.com, and he appeared as a weekly contributor to Sunday NFL Countdown with his weekly "Mayne Event" segment. During his time at ESPN, he became known for his dry sense of humor.

== Early life and education ==
Mayne was born in Kent, Washington. He attended community college and was an honorable mention as junior college All-American quarterback in 1978 at Wenatchee Valley College in Wenatchee, Washington. He graduated from the University of Nevada, Las Vegas in 1982 with a degree in broadcasting.While at UNLV, Mayne was a backup quarterback for two years and he later tried out for the Seattle Seahawks, but was not offered a contract.

== Career ==
Mayne began his television career with a brief stint as a reporter for KLVX-TV in Las Vegas. Mayne then spent seven years (1982–89) at KSTW-TV in Seattle, Washington, working as a weekend sports anchor and weekday news reporter.

=== ESPN ===
ESPN hired Mayne in 1994 after Mayne had sent ESPN a note inquiring whether the network would hire him. The note simply asked to check a box, including one option that read, "We'll hire you when there's an ESPN5."

Mayne started at ESPN in 1994 as a SportSmash anchor on ESPN2, then became the anchor of the weekend edition of RPM 2Night from its start on Labor Day weekend 1995 until August 1997.

On his final edition of RPM 2Night, Kenny played a phone call he received from David Letterman, then a co-owner of Rahal Racing, that he could not quit doing RPM 2Night. After that, Mayne moved over to the main network. He served, for a time, as co-anchor of the 11PM SportsCenter with Dan Patrick after Keith Olbermann left ESPN.

He left SportsCenter two years later, moving to an assortment of late night ESPN shows which were usually re-aired throughout the next morning. Included in his repertoire was the game show 2 Minute Drill. Mayne is now most often seen as the host for ABC and ESPN's horse racing events. He provided offbeat feature stories on Sunday NFL Countdown in a weekly segment called The Mayne Event.

On January 17, 2007, ESPN signed Mayne to a one-year contract to do features and cover horse racing, as well as return to SportsCenter for about 50 shows in 2007.

Beginning October 2, 2008, Mayne starred in ESPN's first scripted web series, Mayne Street, playing a fictionalized version of himself.

In 2011, ESPN launched Kenny Mayne's Wider World of Sports, a series of videos on ESPN.com highlighting Mayne's trips around the world. In the first season the show visited six countries (England, Ireland, Brazil, South Africa, Thailand, and New Zealand) with Mayne participating in events like the King's Cup Elephant Polo tournament in Thailand, the world's longest par-3 hole (Extreme 19) in South Africa, and a road bowling match in Ireland.

A television version of Kenny Mayne's Wider World of Sports, featuring highlights from the internet series, aired on ESPN/ABC in December 2011. Season 2 of Wider World of Sports featured visits to the Netherlands for canal jumping, Nicaragua for volcano boarding, Italy for the Palio di Siena horse race, Bosnia and Herzegovina for bridge diving at Stari Most, Switzerland for hornussen, and Scotland for the Highland Games.

Both seasons of Kenny Mayne's Wider World of Sports have been honored in the Online Film and Video category of the Webby Awards, which annually recognize the best websites, videos, apps, and social media on the internet.

Mayne returned to SportsCenter on October 15, 2013, after a five-year absence. A new contract with ESPN signed earlier that month set Mayne to anchor 70 episodes of SportsCenter and host 10 special features per year through 2015. At the time Mayne described the new deal was "sort of a part-time job" and implied dissatisfaction with some of the caveats. The deal effectively ended Mayne's role on horse-racing and terminated his Wider World of Sports series instead focusing his role primarily on SportsCenter.

He commented on the restructuring of his contract by saying "for some readers it looked like I had the keys to the place, and they took the keys away".

On May 10, 2021, Mayne announced that he would be departing from ESPN after 27 years as an anchor and correspondent for the network, declining a 61% pay cut.

=== NBC ===
From July–September 2021, Mayne along with another former ESPN anchor, Cari Champion, hosted streaming coverage of the 2020 Summer Olympics on Peacock called Tokyo Tonight. Mayne, in an interview with journalist Julie Stewart-Binks, said the series will "[catch] the viewers up on what they may have not seen."

== Other ventures ==
Mayne was also in the 1998 film BASEketball, which featured the creators of South Park, Trey Parker and Matt Stone. He was alongside Dan Patrick and appeared on SportsCenter to cover the latest BASEketball playoff competition. In 1999, he played himself on an episode of The Drew Carey Show entitled "Tracy Bowl".

Before agreeing to the deal with ESPN, Mayne had talks with Comedy Central about doing a sports-themed The Daily Show-style program and was a finalist to be the host of the syndicated version of Deal or No Deal. He confirmed both discussions.

In 2008, Mayne penned his first book, An Incomplete and Inaccurate History of Sport, a collection of offbeat musings on sports and pop culture. In 2010, he appeared in the animated film Kung Fu Magoo as himself.

In 1979, during a college football game, Mayne suffered torn ligaments and a fractured fibula after a collision; the injury effectively ended his playing career. Later, in his 50s, his injury would occasionally flare up, and he eventually found relief by using a special leg brace. In 2018, he founded the non-profit organization Run Freely, that provides such braces to injured veterans.

He has a golf podcast called We Need a Fourth with Cooper Manning and Brian Baumgartner, produced by SmartLess Media.
