= Shaparak Khorsandi on television and radio =

Iranian-born British comedian and author on television and radio

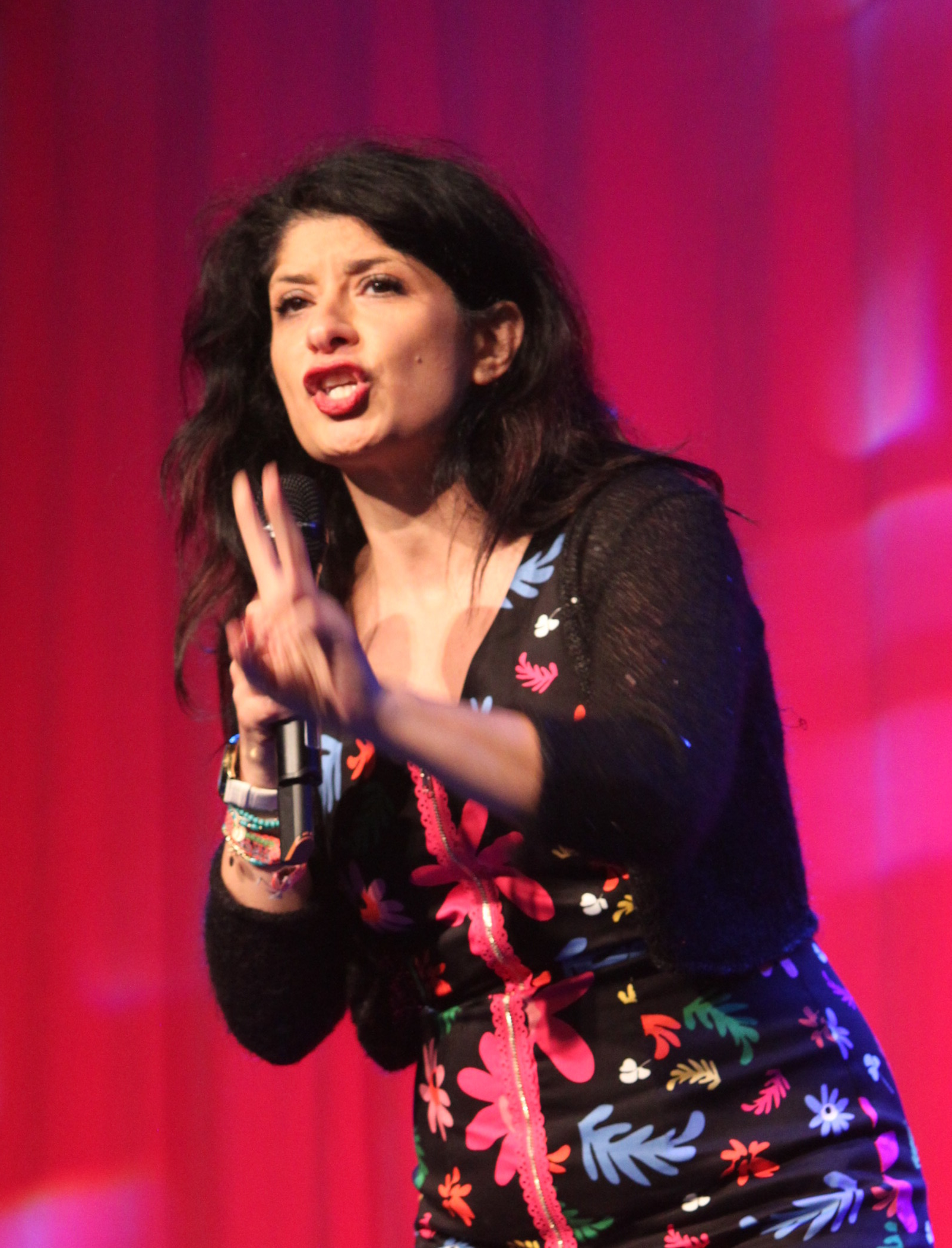
Khorsandi at Glastonbury Festival in 2015

Shaparak Khorsandi, who previously performed professionally as Shappi Khorsandi, is an Iranian-born British comedian and author. Her Iranian heritage and reactions to it are frequently referenced in her stand-up comedy performances. She rose to national prominence after her 2006 Edinburgh Festival Fringe show Asylum Speaker, and appearing at the Secret Policeman's Ball two years later. She has appeared on numerous British television and radio programmes, including the BBC Radio 4 programme Shappi Talk (2009 and 2010), and I'm a Celebrity...Get Me Out of Here! in 2017.

== Selected television appearances ==
Television appearances
| Year | Title | Role | Notes | Ref. |
|---|---|---|---|---|
| 1999 | But You Speak Such Good English | on-screen participant | | |
| 2006, 2007 | Mock the Week | guest | | |
| 2006 | Inside Out South | guest | | |
| 2006, 2010, 2015, 2018 | Question Time | guest | | |
| 2006 | The Sunday Edition | on-screen participant | | |
| 2008 | The Secret Policeman's Ball 2008 | on-screen participant | | |
| 2008, 2010, 2012 | Live at the Apollo | guest | | |
| 2009 | 8 Out of 10 Cats | on-screen participant | | |
| 2009 | Friday Night with Jonathan Ross | guest | | |
| 2010 | Channel 4's Comedy Gala | performer | | |
| 2010 | The Culture Show at the Edinburgh Festival | reporter | | |
| 2010 | My Favourite Joke | on-screen participant | | |
| 2010 | Spice Britain | presenter | | |
| 2011 | Little Crackers | writer | episode "Shappi 4 Todd" | |
| 2012 | This Week | on-screen participant | | |
| 2012 | Comedy World Cup | on-screen participant | | |
| 2013 | The Culture Show from Edinburgh: Funny Women | on-screen participant | | |
| 2014 | Loose Women | guest presenter | | |
| 2014 | The Blame Game | on-screen participant | BBC Northern Ireland | |
| 2014 | It Was Alright in the 1970s | cast member | | |
| 2015 | Channel 4's Comedy Gala | performer | | |
| 2016 | Channel 4's Comedy Gala | performer | | |
| 2016 | My Worst Job | cast member | | |
| 2017 | Parenting for Idiots | cast member | | |
| 2017 | I'm a Celebrity...Get Me Out of Here! | contestant | | |
| 2020 | Celebrity Antiques Road Trip | participant | | |
| 2021 | Blankety Blank | participant | | |
| 2022 | Walking with Shappi Khorsandi | Presenter | | |

== Selected radio appearances ==
Radio appearances
| Year | Title | Role | Notes | Ref. |
|---|---|---|---|---|
| 2002, 2005 | Four at the Store | performer | | |
| 2006 | Sentimental Journey | guest | | |
| 2006 | A Good Read | guest | | |
| 2008 | Loose Ends | guest | | |
| 2006 | My Teenage Diary | guest | | |
| 2009 | Shappi Talk (Four episodes) | guest | | |
| 2009 | Front Row | guest | | |
| 2009 | Steve Wright in the Afternoon | guest | | |
| 2011 | And the Winner Is... | guest | | |
| 2023 | The Confessional: The Confession of Shaparak Khorsandi | guest | | |
