= Jack Whitehall: Travels with My Father =

- A promotional poster for the first series, which released in 2017.
- Genre: Travel documentary comedy
- Created by: Jack Whitehall
- Presented by: Jack Whitehall; Michael Whitehall
- Country of origin: United Kingdom
- Original language: English
- No. of series: 5
- No. of episodes: 18

Production
- Running time: 29–61 min
- Production companies: Tiger Aspect Productions; Cave Bear Productions; Jackpot Productions

Original release
- Network: Netflix
- Release: September 22, 2017 – September 14, 2021

Jack Whitehall: Travels with My Father is a travel documentary/road trip comedy television series that debuted on Netflix. The show is presented by comedian Jack Whitehall and his father, Michael Whitehall. The show covers the pair's travels to various places around the world, encountering silly and awkward situations.

The first series consist of six episodes and was released on Netflix on 22 September 2017, and covers the pair's travel to South East Asia on a popular "gap year route", and involves them travelling through Thailand, Vietnam, and Cambodia. The series was renewed for a second series which was filmed in Eastern Europe. The second season premiered on 28 September 2018, and consisted of five episodes. The third season was filmed in the American west and premiered on 6 September 2019, and only consisted of two episodes. The fourth season was filmed in Australia and premiered on 22 September 2020, and consisted of another two episodes. A fifth season, filmed in the U.K. and consisting of three episodes, was released on 14 September 2021.

== Series overview ==
Season	Episodes	Originally released
1	6	September 22, 2017
2	5	September 28, 2018
3	2	September 6, 2019
4	2	September 22, 2020
5	3	September 14, 2021

== Episodes ==
=== Series 1 (2017) ===
Series 1 sees Jack and his father, Michael, embark on the trip of a lifetime across South East Asia. Along the way the pair visits Thailand, Cambodia and Vietnam.

No. overall	No. in series	Title	Original release date
1	1	"Episode 1"	September 22, 2017
Comedian Jack Whitehall brings his father Michael Whitehall to Southeast Asia as part of Jack's gap year. They start in Bangkok, Thailand at Khao San Road but while Jack has arranged to stay in a hostel, Michael insists on staying in a five-star hotel, and Jack obliges. They have dinner at the Sirocco. They meet Pru, their regional guide. They visit a shrine dedicated to Chuchok and have dinner at a street-side restaurant. The next day they attend a King's Cup Elephant Polo match, with Jack joining the team from New Zealand.
2	2	"Episode 2"	September 22, 2017
Pru takes the Whitehalls to a temple garden where they meet a Buddhist monk who is originally from England. The temple grounds have some peculiar statues. While Michael stays at the hotel, Jack meets members of Team Farang, a group that specializes in parkour. He trains at a trampoline park, and then free-runs with them up a 42-story derelict building. Later, the Whitehalls then visit a shop where they sell Luk Thep dolls, ones that look very realistic, and acquire one which Michael names Winston. Later, Jack and Michael board the Eastern & Oriental Express to visit part of the Burma Railway that inspired the film The Bridge on the River Kwai.
3	3	"Episode 3"	September 22, 2017
The pair travel to the holiday island of Phuket, where Jack has arranged to stay at a straw beach hut. Jack takes Michael on a sea kayak, but Michael throws his oar away so that Jack has to do all the paddling. While Jack gets a massage at the beach, Michael is dissatisfied with the restrooms by the beach, so he rents a room. Jack takes Michael to a Full Moon Party. The following day, they travel by boat to Ko Panyi, where a hungover Jack participates in a football match on a floating pitch with the Panyee FC youth team. Jack meets Steven Seagal at the hotel before they head to the Thailand-Cambodia border.
4	4	"Episode 4"	September 22, 2017
The duo arrive in Poipet, Cambodia where they ride a norry to Battambang. There, Jack looks for a local restaurant and samples some delicacies including snake and rat, and later takes his father there. The pair then visit Angkor Wat where Jack tries his hand at teaching the Buddhist monks some English phrases. They learn about the horrors of the Khmer Rouge regime, visiting a cave where ten thousand people were killed and their bodies dumped. At dusk, they watch another cave where a large number of bats pour out for their evening excursion.
5	5	"Episode 5"	September 22, 2017
At Siem Reap, Jack and Michael visit a shadow puppet theater performance, and then participate in a story where Michael narrates The Dam Busters and Jack works the puppets. But when Jack tries to spice up the performance by splashing water on Michael and the kids, Michael does not want to participate in anything the next day. Jack joins APOPO for the day where they have trained rats to detect land mines. After checking with his wife, Michael agrees to support Jack, and they get matching tattoos and enjoy some night life afterwards. They then travel to Hoi An in Vietnam. They try to paddle a boat but get stuck on the water, and have to get a local to tow them. The local shows Jack how to row a bowl-shaped watercraft called a coracle. They then visit the Bà Nà Hills which has become a European-styled resort / theme park attraction with a Western-styled cathedral and even some Eastern Europeans who dress up as princesses and princes to entertain.
6	6	"Episode 6"	September 22, 2017
The final leg of their journey sees the Whitehalls heading to Hanoi in Vietnam. Jack wants to drive for the first time ever, but soon gets their vehicle stuck. They visit a shop in Hàng Mã Street that sells paper objects that can be burned for their ancestors, buying a bunch of items for Michael's parents, and then visit a shrine where they put the items in an oven. They visit the studio of performance artist Mr. Khanh, and do drawings of Michael. At night, they visit a local park where they do stick jumping. riding a street trike, and ballroom dancing. They return to Bangkok and look back over their time together.

=== Series 2 (2018) ===
In the second series, Jack and his father, Michael, embark on a road trip across Europe. It is to be a trip of high culture and timeless art, a true rite of passage in the vein of the 18th-century Grand Tours, however, Jack has other plans. Along their way they visit Germany, Hungary, Romania, Moldova, Ukraine and Turkey.

No. overall	No. in series	Title	Original release date
7	1	"Episode 1"	September 28, 2018
Michael wants to take Jack on a historical and cultural tour through Eastern Europe. They start in the Bavarian Alps. They visit the town of Berchtesgaden and then Obersalzberg, where they visit the ruins of Hitler's holiday home. Jack finds the tour to be dry so he arranges for a host named Happy Bavarian Joe. They visit Zugspitze, Germany's highest mountain, but a blizzard blocks the view at the summit. They stay in some accommodations carved in the ice where there is access to hot tub and sauna. They visit a car park near Ramsau where they try skijoring (riding a snowmobile while towing a skier). They board a sleeping car train to Hungary, but find the compartment to be a couchette.
8	2	"Episode 2"	September 28, 2018
In Hungary the pair visits Budapest. The first stop on Michael's mission to get Jack cultured is the Hungarian State Opera House, however, they find themselves lost. Jack gets them a ride on a city beer bike where they try some Unicum liqueur. They discover that the Opera House is closed for restoration, much to Michael's dismay. They visit The House of Houdini museum, where they are wowed by the local escapologist, the Great Merlini (David Merlini), who gets out of a straitjacket, after which Jack wants to try the trick, but cannot. The father-son duo take a boat ride along the river Danube, where Michael shares some words of wisdom with Jack. They rent a camper van to head into rural Romania, hoping to see Prince Charles's favorite holiday spot, but at the border to Transylvania, the guard thinks Michael's doll Winston might be smuggling drugs and has him stripped of his clothes. They participate in a traditional mask dance. They visit a wool maker where Michael thinks he can get a bargain on some coats, but gets the exchange rate wrong.
9	3	"Episode 3"	September 28, 2018
In Transylvania, Romania, their guide Andra takes the two to visit a renowned white witch named Maria who reads their fortunes using tarot cards. They then visit the Merry Cemetery in Săpânța where Jack surprises Michael with his own customized headstone. They then go to Chișinău, Moldova where Jack will be meeting his favorite pop band from the Eurovision Song Contest, the SunStroke Project. They visit the Mileștii Mici, one of the largest underground wine cellars in the world. Michael takes a liking to the host. That night, Jack performs with SunStroke Project for a song at their local concert.
10	4	"Episode 4"	September 28, 2018
In Kyiv, Ukraine, Michael wants Jack to toughen up, so he has his Cossack host Dimitri take Jack to Kachalka Gym, an outdoor fitness park with exercise machines fashioned out of old military parts. They then learn some military training tactics from a Special Forces agent. They visit the Chernobyl New Safe Confinement structure (site of the Chernobyl disaster) and the ruins of the abandoned town. They visit the city of Odessa in the Ukrainian Riviera and participate in Humorina, an arts festival where revelers in a parade dress up as clowns, one of the things that Jack thinks Michael has a fear of.
11	5	"Episode 5"	September 28, 2018
Jack and Michael go to Istanbul, Turkey for their final part of their journey. To celebrate Michael's birthday, Jack sets Michael up in the Çırağan Palace, a five-star hotel that Jack discovers has a very expensive room rate, complete with butlers. Before taking them to see some of the city's sights, their guide notes that Jack is wearing shorts instead of pants so they visit the Grand Bazaar, one of the oldest "malls" in the world. They visit a hookah lounge, and in the evening, watch Turkish belly dancing performed by a man. The next morning, Jack tries to bring Michael breakfast in bed, but Michael wants to sleep. He then surprises Michael when Jack's mother and Michael's wife Hilary arrives. They take a cruise on a private yacht Jack rented, along with the guy they met at the Moldovan winery serves them drinks.

=== Series 3 (2019) ===
In the third series, Jack shows his father around the American west in the hope that he will move there with him. However, in usual fashion, Michael tries to take the whole trip over.

No. overall	No. in series	Title	Original release date
12	1	"Episode 1"	September 6, 2019
Jack brings his father to California for a tour of Los Angeles and Compton where Jack has been wanting to develop his acting career. They visit a yoga studio but Michael refuses to disrobe to do naked yoga. The next day they visit a positive-theme restaurant called Cafe Gratitude, and then board a vintage Greyhound bus to Phoenix, Arizona. Jack participates in an independent pro wrestling promotion.
13	2	"Episode 2"	September 6, 2019
Jack and Michael visit the senior living community of Sun City West, Arizona where they participate in tap dancing lessons and a game of Bingo. After stops in Tombstone, Arizona (where they dress up in Western clothes and then go out to a shooting range), Jack and Michael go to Las Vegas, where a surprise guest could ruin Jack's "lads and dads" itinerary. They see the Bellagio Fountains, do a car chase experience, and have a themed meal that has cannabis infusions. Jack takes them to a Magic Mike show.

=== Series 4 (2020) ===
In the fourth series, Jack shows his father around Australia.

No. overall	No. in series	Title	Original release date
14	1	"Episode 1"	September 22, 2020
15	2	"Episode 2"	September 22, 2020

=== Series 5: The Final Journey (2021) ===
In the fifth and final series, Jack shows his father around the United Kingdom; later, they reminisce about their favorite moments on the series.

No. overall	No. in series	Title	Original release date
16	1	"Episode 1"	September 14, 2021
Hilary sends Jack and Michael to various places in the UK. The three have a meal at Gordon Ramsay's Lucky Cat restaurant where Ramsay is actually in the kitchen. Michael drives Jack around London in a Mini Cooper. Then, the two travel to Cerne Abbas to try Morris dancing by the Cerne Abbas Giant. They tour Chartwell, which was Winston Churchill's home, and then visit the Burgh Island Hotel where they attend a mystery dinner. They meet up with Hilary at the Palé Hall Hotel near Mount Snowdon to celebrate the parents' 35th wedding anniversary. Hilary and Jack camp on the side of a cliff at Anglesey.
17	2	"Episode 2"	September 14, 2021
18	3	"The Best of Travels with My Father"	September 14, 2021
