= RHFS =

RHFS may refer to:

- Régiment d'hélicoptères des forces spéciales
- Rich Hall's Fishing Show

== See also ==
- RHF (disambiguation)
