= Remke van Veelen =

Dutch fiction writer

Remke van Veelen (1978) is a Dutch fiction writer. She writes for the Dutch brand of Sesame Street. She works as a commissioning editor for the publisher Eenvoudig Communiceren.

== Bibliography ==
June 2002 saw the appearance of Van Veelens debut novel Ellen Ellen with publisher Vassallucci (ISBN 9789050003803).

Excerpt: Wat er gaat gebeuren weet ik niet. Ik heb het gevoel dat er wel eens iemand op mij zou kunnen wachten.

== Life ==
=== Education ===
Remke van Veelen followed an education for writers at the Hogeschool voor de Kunsten Utrecht.
