= Backchat (2013 TV series) =

- Also known as: Backchat with Jack and Michael Whitehall
- Created by: Jack Whitehall
- Presented by: Jack Whitehall; Michael Whitehall
- Country of origin: United Kingdom
- Original language: English
- No. of series: 2
- No. of episodes: 15

Production
- Production locations: Riverside Studios; The London Studios
- Running time: 30–60 minutes
- Production company: Tiger Aspect Productions

Original release
- Network: BBC Two (series 2–); BBC Three (series 1)
- Release: 20 November 2013 – 26 December 2015

Backchat with Jack Whitehall and His Dad, or simply Backchat, is a chat show that was originally broadcast on BBC Three but moved to BBC Two for its second series. The show is presented by comedian Jack Whitehall and his father Michael Whitehall, a theatrical agent who used to manage celebrities such as Colin Firth and Judi Dench. The chat show consisted of various games and quizzes presented towards celebrities who were guests on the episode, and began airing from 20 November 2013. In June 2014, Backchat returned for two summer specials in aid of the World Cup and Father's Day.

Following successful repeats of the first series on BBC Two, it was announced on 21 August 2014 that Backchat would return for a second series on BBC Two. The second series began on 5 January 2015 on BBC Two.

Following on from the second series, Backchat returned on BBC Two on 26 December 2015 for an End of Year Special.

== Episodes ==
=== Series 1 (2013) ===
#	Original airdate	Guests	Viewers (millions)
1	20 November 2013	Danny Dyer and Jeremy Paxman	0.764
2	27 November 2013	Gary Lineker, Holly Hagan, Marnie Simpson and Scott Timlin	—N/a
3	4 December 2013	Nick Hewer and Lethal Bizzle	0.658
4	11 December 2013	Bear Grylls, Rylan Clark and Louie Spence	
5	18 December 2013 (Christmas Special)	Nigel Havers, Christine Bleakley, Lee Mack, Jean Barker, Baroness Trumpington, Kriss Akabusi, Hilary Whitehall and the cast of Bad Education	
6	1 January 2014 (New Year Compilation)		

- Episodes 1-4 were repeated on BBC Two throughout July 2014. Episodes 5 and 6 were shown on BBC Two in December 2014.

=== Summer Specials (2014) ===
#	Original airdate	Guests	Viewers (millions)
1	3 June 2014	James Corden, Harry Redknapp, Henning Wehn and Rachel Riley	
2	15 June 2014	Nev Wiltshire, Jonathan Ross, Judy Murray and Mo Farah	

- The Summer Specials were also repeated on BBC Two but were edited to 30 minutes.

=== Series 2 (2015) ===
The second series of Backchat consisted of six episodes and was broadcast on BBC Two from Monday 5 January 2015. The episodes have been recorded throughout November and December 2014.

#	Original airdate	Guests	Viewers (millions)
1 (7)	5 January 2015	Michael Ball and David Walliams	—N/a
2 (8)	12 January 2015	John Prescott and Noel Fielding	—N/a
3 (9)	19 January 2015	McBusted and Richard Osman	—N/a
4 (10)	26 January 2015	Joan Collins and Miranda Hart	—N/a
5 (11)	2 February 2015	Cilla Black and John Bishop	—N/a
6 (12)	9 February 2015	Highlights Special	—N/a

=== Backchat Looks Back (2015) ===
A Christmas special was recorded on 12 December 2015 at The London Studios and aired on BBC Two on 26 December 2015.

Original airdate	Guests	Viewers (millions)
26 December 2015	Rob Brydon, Victoria Coren Mitchell, Lady Colin Campbell and KSI	—N/a
