= Rich Hall's Cattle Drive =

- Created by: Rich Hall and Mike Wilmot
- Starring: Rich Hall; Mike Wilmot; Simon Evans; Ralph Brown; Archie Kelly
- Country of origin: United Kingdom
- No. of episodes: 6

Production
- Running time: 30 minutes

Original release
- Network: BBC Four
- Release: 12 January – 16 February 2006

Rich Hall's Cattle Drive is a television sitcom starring Rich Hall and Mike Wilmot. It was broadcast in 2006 in the United Kingdom on BBC Four, and ran for one series consisting of six episodes. It has been repeated on BBC Four but has not been shown on British terrestrial television.

== Plot ==
After spending a night in jail for attacking a burglar, Rich and Mike (playing themselves) decide that the only way to avoid what they perceive to be the warped justice of the legal system in the UK is to become outlaws and live like cowboys in 21st century Britain, riding out of London on horse-back.

== Cast ==
Rich Hall – Himself / U. Horst Nightmare
Mike Wilmot – Himself
Simon Evans – Melvin Turpin
Ralph Brown – Truesdale
Archie Kelly – Clement
