= RHF =

RHF may refer to:

- Regional health authority or Regionalt helseforetak, of Norway
- Ice Hockey Federation of Russia (Russian Hockey Federation)
- Residence Hall Federation at Virginia Tech campus
- Royal Highland Fusiliers
- Right heart failure or Right-sided heart failure
- RHF Productions, owners of brand Red Hot TV (UK)
- Rhythm Heaven Fever

== See also ==
- RHFS (disambiguation)
