= Mike Wilmot =

Canadian stand-up comedian

- Born: Toronto, Ontario, Canada

Comedy career
- Medium: Stand-up, television, film
- Website: Official website

Mike Wilmot is a Canadian stand-up comedian represented by Off the Kerb. In 2005 he won two Canadian Comedy Awards for best male stand-up and best actor for his work in It's All Gone Pete Tong.

In addition to It's All Gone Pete Tong, Wilmot has appeared on Corner Gas, British TV shows such as Never Mind the Buzzcocks, and alongside American comedian Rich Hall in BBC television series Rich Hall's Fishing Show and Rich Hall's Cattle Drive. He was the host of the Paramount comedy series Comedy Blue. He has also appeared on the Australian TV show Good News Week (Network 10) as a guest panelist and visits Australia annually to perform at the Melbourne International Comedy Festival.

In 2009, he starred as Michael Valmont-Selkirk, the crooked and corrupt director of a philanthropic foundation in the Canadian TV series The Foundation.

== Filmography ==
Film
| Year | Title | Role | Notes |
|---|---|---|---|
| 1997 | That Old Feeling | Man at Wedding | |
| 1997 | The Wrong Guy | Wallace | |
| 2004 | Booze, Beaches and Badgers | Himself | Documentary |
| 2004 | It's All Gone Pete Tong | Max Haggar | |
| 2013 | The F Word | Murray | Also released as What If? |
| 2013 | The Art of the Steal | Detroit Border Guard | |
| 2013 | It Was You Charlie | Detective Powell | |
| 2014 | Kingdom Come | Old Man | |
| 2014 | Running Season | Roy Wood | Short film |

Television
| Year | Title | Role | Notes |
|---|---|---|---|
| 1997 | The Newsroom | Campaign Car Driver | Season 1 episode 13: "The Campaign" |
| 1999 | Coming Unglued | Cabbie #1 | |
| 2001 | Kiss My Act | Yuke M.C. | TV film |
| 2001 | Badly Funded Think Tank | Himself | Short; Writer |
| 2002 | Brain Candy | Himself | TV film |
| 2003 | Melbourne International Comedy Festival Gala | Himself | |
| 2003 | Fishing Show | Himself | |
| 2003–2010 | Just for Laughs | Himself | Performer (2 episodes); Writer (2 episodes) |
| 2003–2012 | The Ha!ifax Comedy Fest | Himself | Writer; 4 episodes |
| 2004 | Corner Gas | Carl | Season 1 episode 8: "Cousin Carl" |
| 2004 | Election Special: One Bullet One Vote | Himself | Documentary; Writer |
| 2005 | 28 Acts in 28 Minutes | Himself | |
| 2006 | Rich Hall's Cattle Drive | Himself | Writer (6 episodes) |
| 2007 | The Naughty Show | Himself | Headliner |
| 2008 | The Jon Dore Television Show | Jimmy the Jaguar | Season 1 episode 11: "Jonathan-A-Thon" |
| 2008 | CBC Winnipeg Comedy Festival | Himself | Host; 2 episodes |
| 2008 | All the Comforts | Mac | |
| 2009 | The Foundation | Michael Valmont-Selkirk | Main role |
| 2011 | Live at the Apollo | Himself | |
| 2011 | Not Going Out | Director | Season 4 episode 3: "Movie" |
| 2011 | Stand Up for the Week | Himself/Red Kuntz | Guest performer Voice; Uncredited |
| 2011 | The Debaters | Himself | Writer; Season 1 episode 23: "3D & Camping" |
| 2012 | Just for Laughs: All-Access | Season 4 episode 10 | |
| 2014 | The Ron James Show | | |
| 2014 | Flickers! | Beach Ghost (Voice)/Mike | Episodes 1 and 2: "Back Door to Magic" and "Thanks, Steam Whistle!" |
| 2015 | The Nasty Show Hosted by Artie Lange | Himself | |
| 2022 | Moominvalley | Stinky (voice) | Episodes 27, 31, 33, 37 and 39: "Homecoming", "The Stinky Caper", "Winter Secrets", "Call of the Hattifatteners" and "Midsummer Magic" |

== Awards and nominations ==
Mike Wilmot awards and nominations
Awards and nominations
| Award | Wins | Nominations |
Totals
| Barry Award | 1 | 2 |
| Canadian Comedy Awards | 2 | 7 |
| Time Out Comedy Awards | 1 | 1 |
| Wins | 5 |
| Nominations | 11 |

| Year | Nominated work | Award | Category | Result |
|---|---|---|---|---|
| 2000 | Mike Wilmot | Canadian Comedy Awards | Best Male Stand-Up | Nominated |
| 2001 | Mike Wilmot | Canadian Comedy Awards | Best Male Stand-Up | Nominated |
| 2002 | Mike Wilmot | Canadian Comedy Awards | Best Male Stand-Up | Nominated |
| 2002 | Mike Wilmot | Time Out Comedy Awards | Best Stand-Up | Won |
| 2003 | Mike Wilmot | Barry Award | Most outstanding Comedy Act at the Melbourne International Comedy Festival | Won |
| 2003 | Mike Wilmot | Canadian Comedy Awards | Best Male Stand-Up | Nominated |
| 2004 | Mike Wilmot | Canadian Comedy Awards | Best Male Stand-Up | Nominated |
| 2005 | Mike Wilmot | Barry Award | Most outstanding Comedy Act at the Melbourne International Comedy Festival | Nominated |
| 2005 | Mike Wilmot | Canadian Comedy Awards | Best Male Stand-Up | Won |
| 2005 | It's All Gone Pete Tong | Canadian Comedy Awards | Best Performance by a Male - Film | Won |
| 2007 | Mike Wilmot | Canadian Comedy Awards | Best Male Stand-Up | Won |
