= Ivor Dembina =

British stand-up comedian

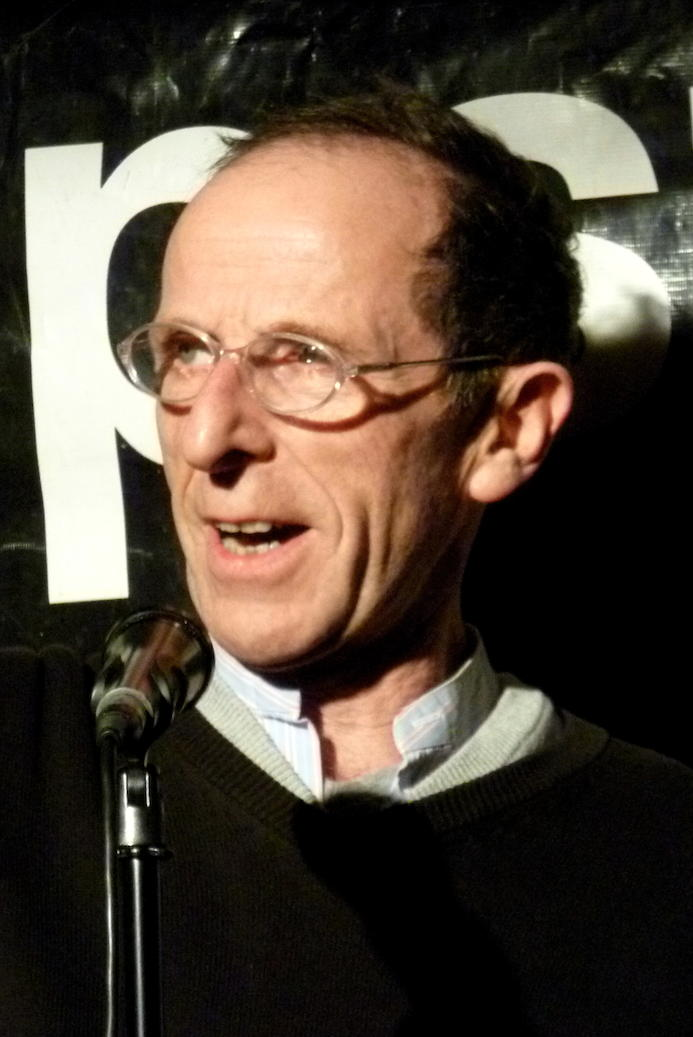
- Born: Ivor Joseph Dembina; 14 April 1951 (age 75); London, England

Comedy career
- Years active: 1987–present
- Medium: Stand up, writer, Comedy club curator
- Genre: Alternative comedy
- Subjects: Jewish culture, Current events, Sex, Human interaction, Racism
- Website: www.thinkbeforeyoulaugh.com

Ivor Joseph Dembina (born 14 April 1951) is a British stand-up comedian and writer in the alternative tradition from London.

== Career ==
Dembina attributed his early "reputation for generally doing some decent gigs" to having "the brains to make sure there is a microphone facing the right way."

In 1987, together with club promoter, Addison Cresswell, he founded the Comedy Boom venue at the Edinburgh Festival Fringe in the basement of the Abercraig Lounge. It was the Edinburgh Festival Fringe's first venue that exclusively hosted stand-up comedy, and ran for five years.

After that, his career veered towards performance. He created and compèred a show called Comic Abuse at Pleasance Courtyard in the late 80s, which became a successful fixture and introduced acts such as Jo Brand and Jack Dee.

Dembina runs the Hampstead Comedy Club in North London, which he founded in 1994. He is cited as an early influence by Stewart Lee. He wrote for the first season of the Omid Djalili Show on BBC1. He appeared in the first season of Eye Spy as 'Jewish Dad' on Channel 4. He was the first stand-up comedian to perform a solo comedy show at the Houses of Parliament.

Dembina's comedy focuses on his Jewish background and his political outlook. He toured his show about the Israel-Palestine conflict, 'This is Not a Subject For Comedy', in Israel and on the West Bank. In 1998 he wrote and performed a show entitled SadoJudaism in which he talked about the worlds of fetishism and prostitution through Jewish eyes.

Stewart Lee credits him for correcting his microphone technique during a new act competition in 1990, calling him "the Obi-Wan Kenobi of comedy".

== Political stance ==
Dembina has attracted attention for his anti-Zionist and socialist views.

In 2004, while on his way to perform stand-up comedy in Israel and the West Bank, Dembina was detained for several hours by Israeli police at Ben Gurion Airport after his name reportedly appeared on a list of "known radicals".

In 2008, Dembina organised a comedy event called "60 Years: What A State" on Israel's independence day, Yom Ha'atzmaut. Featuring Jeremy Hardy, Mark Steel, Reginald D Hunter and Shazia Mirza, it was on the same evening a gala event organised by the Zionist Federation at the Wembley Arena celebrated 60 years of the Israeli state. He branded the gala's headliner, American comedian Jackie Mason, a "bad Jewish joke", citing Mason's support for Israel and that comedian Ray Hanania, of Palestinian descent, had been dropped from supporting Mason on tour in 2002. Dembina said: "Never mind Israel not wanting to share Jerusalem with Palestinians, he won't even share a stage with one."

In 2011, Dembina threatened legal action and called for an investigation after a protester interrupted his Edinburgh Fringe preview show at a Jewish community centre in Golders Green, accusing him of performing a "tame version for a Jewish audience" and demanding that he reveal his anti-Israel views. Other activists picketed outside and handed out flyers. Ivor said afterwards: "In 25 years in Jewish comedy, during which I have performed both in Britain and abroad—including in Israel—this is the first time someone has attended a performance of mine with the apparent intention of sabotaging it."

In late 2013 and early 2014, Dembina joined other artists and writers including Nigel Kennedy, Yasmin Alibhai-Brown and Mark Steel at St James's Church, Piccadilly for Bethlehem Unwrapped, a festival during the Christmas season that drew attention to the Israeli West Bank barrier.

In 2014, Dembina caused consternation among sections of the Jewish community for organising a benefit show for the people of the Gaza Strip with Daniel Kitson, Josie Long and fellow Jewish comic Andy Zaltzman.

Also in 2014, he angered some other Jewish comedians by banning them from his club because they publicly endorsed and received payment from the Jewish National Fund.

In February 2015, he joined 700 other UK artists including Brian Eno, Mike Leigh and Liz Lochhead as a signatory to a cultural boycott of Israel.

In 2015, Dembina also attracted the interest of the political community for his willingness to use sensitive subjects such as the Holocaust, Israel and Jewish stereotypes in his material.

Dembina is a Labour Party member of the Vauxhall Constituency Labour Party. In April 2016, he was one of 82 Jewish members and supporters of the Labour Party and of Jeremy Corbyn's leadership who wrote an open letter to The Guardian stating that they "do not accept that antisemitism is 'rife' in the Labour party" and that "these accusations are part of a wider campaign against the Labour leadership, and they have been timed particularly to do damage to the Labour party and its prospects in elections in the coming week."

== Notable performances and tours ==
=== The Cochrane Theatre ===
In 1994 Dembina hosted a benefit for Jewish Socialist magazine at the Cochrane Theatre with Jo Brand, Jeremy Hardy, Linda Smith and Arnold Brown

=== Middle East ===
Dembina toured Israel and the West Bank with his show This is Not a Subject for Comedy in 2003.

=== Houses of Parliament ===
He performed the first comedy gig at the UK Houses of Parliament in 2010.

=== Edinburgh shows ===
Dembina has performed at the Edinburgh Festival Fringe since 1991.

Show Title	Co-performer/Guests	Year	Venue
Comic Abuse	Compere Ivor Dembina with Jack Dee, Jo Brand, Mark Thomas, Phil Cornwall, Felix Dexter, Dave Cohen, James Macabre, Patrick Marber and Jim Tavare	1988–1993	The Pleasance
Stand Up Jewish Comedy	solo show	1994	The Pleasance
Arab and the Jew	Omid Djalili	1998	The Pleasance
Ivor Dembina: Jewish Comedy – Free at Last	solo show	2007	Linsay's Basement
This is Not a Subject for Comedy	solo show	2008	Espionage
Laughing Horse Free Comedy Selection	Compere Ivor Dembina with a mixed bill	2008	Espionage
Free Jewish Comedy	solo show	2011	The Counting House
Ivor's Other Show	solo show	2011	The Counting House
Old Jewish Jokes	solo show	2012	Bar 50
Old Jewish Jokes	solo show	2013	Bar 50
Zapp & Dembina – Comedy After Lunch	Andy Zapp and guests	2013	Cowgatehead
Free Gaza!	Daniel Kitson, Josie Long and Andy Zaltzman	2014	The Gilded Balloon
Old Jewish Jokes	solo show	2014	The Gilded Balloon
Zapp & Dembina	Andy Zapp and guests	2014	Cowgatehead
New Jewish Jokes	solo show	2015	The Stand Comedy Club
Old Jewish Jokes	solo show	2015	Finnegan's Wake
I Should Have Listened to Ivor Dembina	solo show	2016	The Stand Comedy Club
Old Jewish Jokes	solo show	2016	Finnegan's Wake
Ivor Dembina Show	solo show	2017	The Counting House
Old Jewish Jokes	solo show	2017	Finnegan's Wake
Old Jewish Jokes	solo show	2018	Finnegan's Wake
Old Jewish Jokes	solo show	2019	Finnegan's Wake
The Joy of Jokes	solo show	2019	The Place
Old Jewish Jokes	solo show	2021	The Counting House
Old Jewish Jokes	solo show	2022	Bar 50
Old Jewish Jokes	solo show	2023	Bar 50
Millwall Jew	solo show	2023	Bar 50

== Written works ==
An early work was the musical play A Week Is A Long Time In Politics about the 1981 Hillmarton By-election in Islington and performed at The Old Red Lion theatre pub there.

Dembina has contributed to many comedy books and been featured in several others.

=== Contributor ===
Title	Editor	Released	Publisher	Notes
Because I Tell a Joke or Two: Comedy, Politics and Social Difference	Stephen Wagg	2004	Routledge	ISBN 978-1-134-79433-1
Getting the Joke: The Art of Stand-up Comedy	Oliver Double	2005	A&C Black	ISBN 978-0-413-77476-7
Funny You Should Say That: A Compendium of Jokes, Quips and Quotations from Cicero to the Simpsons	Andrew Martin	2006	Penguin	ISBN 978-0-14-051509-1
Dim Wit: The Funniest, Stupidest Things Ever Said	Rosemarie Jarski	2008	Random House	ISBN 978-1-4070-2468-4
How to Be Averagely Successful at Comedy	Dave Cohen	2013	Acorn Independent Press	ISBN 978-1-909121-61-4
Performing Live Comedy	Chris Ritchie	2013	A&C Black	ISBN 978-1-4081-4643-9
Words from the Wise: Over 6,000 of the Smartest Things Ever Said	Rosemarie Jarski	2013	Skyhorse Publishing, Inc	ISBN 978-1-62873-273-3

== Comedy clubs ==
Since 1985, Dembina has founded and run several comedy clubs. The Hampstead Comedy Club is the only one still operating.

- Founded the Red Rose Comedy Club in Finsbury Park, London in 1985.
- Founded the Comedy Boom with club promoter, Addison Cresswell in Edinburgh in 1987. The Edinburgh Festival Fringe's first venue for Stand-Up Comedy.
- Founded the Hampstead Comedy Club in 1994. It was originally held at the Washington Arms in Belsize Park, London. It currently resides at the Camden Head in Camden Town, London.
- Founded the Brixton Comedy Club in the Hobgoblin, Brixton, London in 1999.

== Critical opinion ==
The Skinny magazine commented that there is something "modest and eternal" about him. He won a Malcolm Hardee award in 2022, and the 'Editors Pick of the Fringe' award at the 2019 Edinburgh Fringe.

== Collections ==
The University of Kent holds material relating to Dembina's career as part of the British Stand-Up Comedy Archive. The collection includes audiovisual material, press cuttings and business records that relate to his work as both comedian and club promoter.
