= Jack Whitehall =

English comedian, actor, presenter and writer (born 1988)

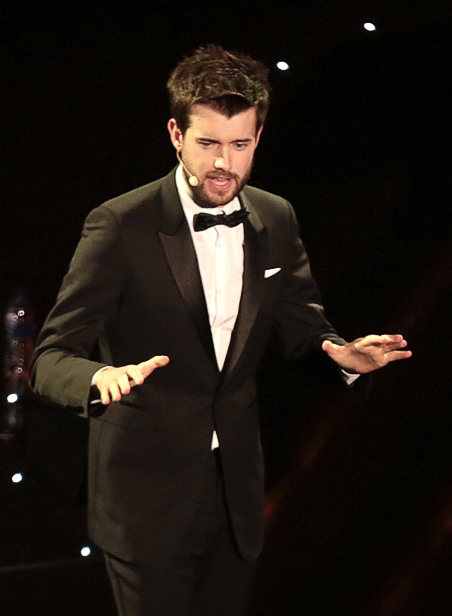
- Whitehall in 2015
- Born: Jack Peter Benedict Whitehall; 7 July 1988 (age 38); London, England
- Education: University of Manchester
- Occupations: Comedian; actor; writer; television personality
- Years active: 1993–present
- Spouse: Roxy Horner (m. 2026)
- Partner: Gemma Chan (2011–2017)
- Children: 1
- Father: Michael Whitehall
- Website: jackwhitehall.com

Jack Peter Benedict Whitehall (born 7 July 1988) is an English comedian, actor, writer and television personality. He is known for his roles as JP in the Channel 4 comedy-drama series Fresh Meat (2011–2016) and as Alfie Wickers in the BBC Three sitcom Bad Education (2012–2014, 2022–2024). He also co-wrote the latter and its film adaptation, The Bad Education Movie (2015).

From 2012 to 2018, Whitehall was a regular panelist on the comedy game show A League of Their Own. In 2017, he appeared alongside his father, Michael Whitehall, in the Netflix comedy documentary series Jack Whitehall: Travels with My Father and starred in the BBC comedy-drama series Decline and Fall. From 2018 to 2021, and again in 2025 and 2026, he hosted the BRIT Awards.

Whitehall performed his first stand-up comedy show at the 2009 Edinburgh Festival Fringe, for which he was nominated for 'Best Newcomer' at the Edinburgh Comedy Awards. He has written and performed five stand-up tours: Jack Whitehall Live (2010–2011), Gets Around (2014), At Large (2017), Stood Up (2019), and Settle Down (2023–2024).

== Early life and education ==
Jack Peter Benedict Whitehall was born on 7 July 1988 at Portland Hospital in the London borough of Westminster, to television producer Michael Whitehall and actress Hilary Amanda Jane Whitehall (née Isbister; stage name Hilary Gish). Whitehall has described his father, a staunch conservative, as "Tory with a capital T", noting that in the 2010 United Kingdom general election, the first that he was eligible to vote in, his father impersonated him via postal vote to ensure his vote would go to the Conservative Party. His father has frequently featured in his son's television programmes. Whitehall has a younger sister and brother.

Whitehall is a descendant of Welsh lawyer Thomas Jones Phillips (not to be confused with Mayor Thomas Phillips) who was a major opponent of the Newport Rising of 1839. He had two godfathers: actors Nigel Havers and Richard Griffiths.

He attended Tower House School in London's East Sheen area, where he was a schoolmate of Robert Pattinson. He has often joked that he resented Pattinson for taking all the best parts in the school plays. Whitehall auditioned for the titular role in Harry Potter and the Philosopher's Stone (2001), but the casting director was unimpressed with him because he had not read the novel. His parents sent him to boarding school at age eleven. He was educated at the Dragon School in Oxford and then Marlborough College. He took a gap year in which he decided to pursue a career in stand-up comedy. He attended the University of Manchester to study history of art, dropping out after two terms.

== Career ==
=== Television and radio career ===
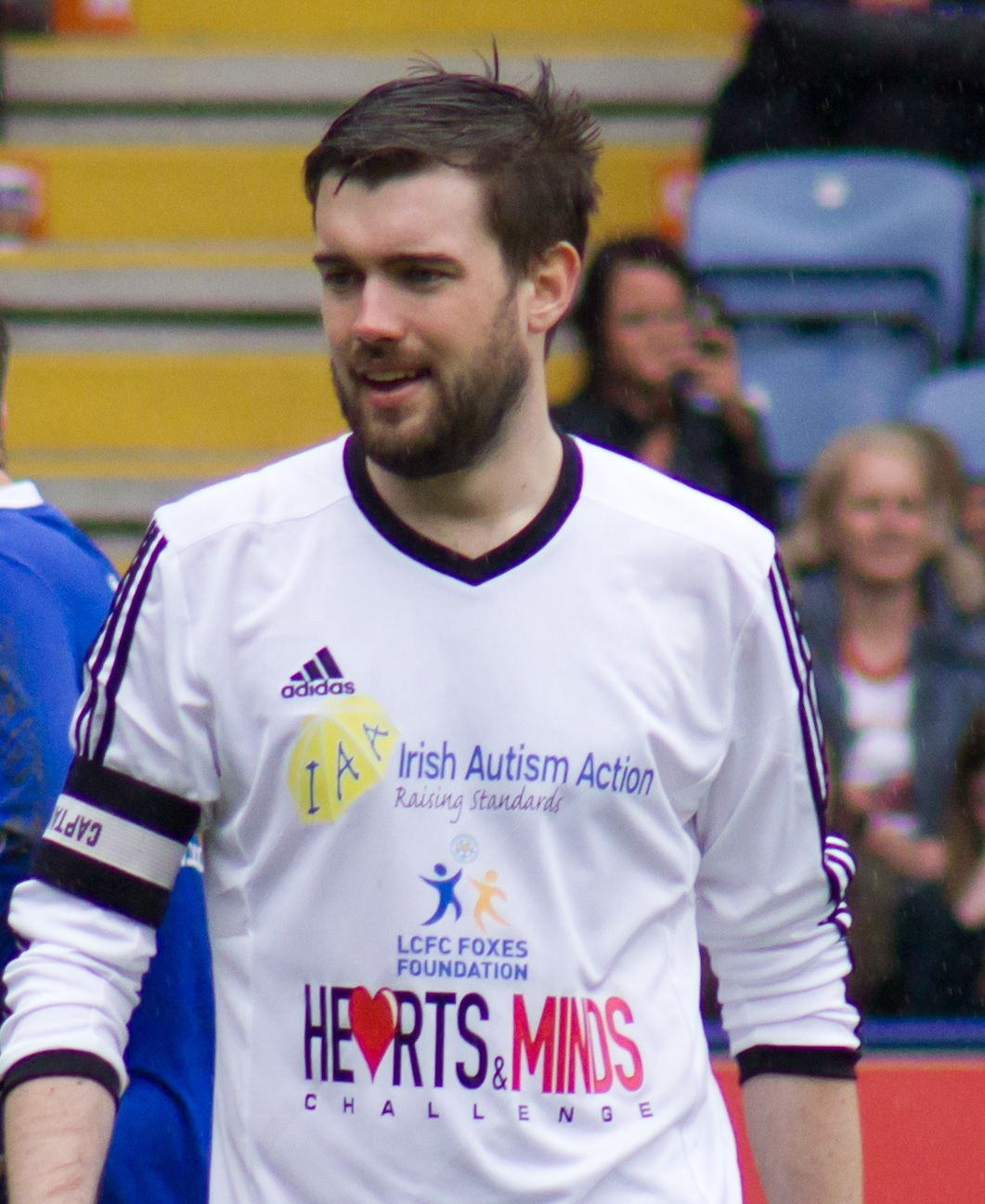
Whitehall playing in a charity football match in May 2014

In 1997 Whitehall (then aged nine) appeared in the series Noah's Ark. In June 2008, he presented the first week of Big Brother's Big Mouth on E4, returning in August to present the twelfth week. In September 2008, Whitehall made his first appearance on Channel 4's 8 Out of 10 Cats.

In January 2009, Whitehall presented Celebrity Big Brother's Big Mouth and appeared on The Sunday Night Project. On 5 June, his third appearance on 8 Out of 10 Cats was broadcast. In June 2009 Whitehall co-presented topical-satire series The TNT Show with Holly Walsh on Channel 4. In August, he appeared on Charlie Brooker's Channel 4 panel show You Have Been Watching, followed in September by his first appearance on Would I Lie to You?. He made his first of many appearances on BBC Two satirical panel show Mock the Week, and in October, he guest-presented an episode of Never Mind the Buzzcocks.

In January 2010, Whitehall made his fourth appearance in 8 Out of 10 Cats, followed in February by his second appearance on Mock the Week, and a first appearance in Argumental on Dave. In April, he featured on Channel 4's Comedy Gala, a benefit show held in aid of Great Ormond Street Children's Hospital, which had been filmed live at The O2 Arena in London in March. In April, he appeared on James Corden's sport show A League of Their Own, and on 11 June made his fifth appearance on 8 Out of 10 Cats, followed in June by his third appearance on Mock the Week. In June and July 2010, Whitehall was a regular performer on the first series of Channel 4's Stand Up for the Week alongside Andi Osho, Kevin Bridges, Rich Hall and presenter Patrick Kielty. In September he made his sixth appearance on 8 Out of 10 Cats, and in September and October, his fourth and fifth appearances on Mock the Week. In October, he appeared on a second episode of Argumental, and he honoured Big Brother presenter Davina McCall on the Channel 4 show A Comedy Roast. In October, he headlined the second episode of Dave's One Night Stand, followed by his second appearance on A League of Their Own, and on 1 November he appeared on Ask Rhod Gilbert. In December, he appeared on the Royal Variety Performance 2010, and in December he appeared on the sixth series of Live at the Apollo, which had been filmed on 27 September.

Whitehall often worked with the late actor Archie Lyndhurst, the only child of Nicholas Lyndhurst, an actor, who is best known for his role as Rodney Trotter in the BBC sitcom Only Fools and Horses. Lyndhurst played Young Jack in the second episode in the second series of the Sky1 Christmas comedy-drama, Little Crackers. The episode, "Jack Whitehall's Little Cracker: Daddy's Little Princess", was broadcast on 18 December 2011. Lyndhurst played Little Jack Whitehall in the ITV television variety show, Tonight at the London Palladium, in the episode broadcast on 28 September 2014. Lyndhurst played Young Alfie Wickers in the BBC Three sitcom, Bad Education. The episode, "The Exam", was broadcast on 14 October 2014. Lyndhurst played Young Jack Whitehall in the short film, Jack Whitehall Gets Around: Intro, which was released on 24 November 2014. In February 2011, Whitehall was featured on Comedy Central Presents Jack Whitehall in the United States. In March, he appeared on the BBC football programme Final Score, reporting on Arsenal's 0–0 draw with Sunderland at the Emirates Stadium. From March until May, Whitehall returned as a regular performer for the second series of Channel 4's Stand Up for the Week together with Andi Osho, Kevin Bridges and Rich Hall, joined for the new series by Jon Richardson. In March, Whitehall and Bridges presented Jack and Kevin's Comic Relief Lock-In, which took the Comic Relief show through to the early hours of the morning with a selection of the best comedy clips of the last couple of years. In May 2011, he made his début appearance on a U.S. chatshow, interviewed by Ellen DeGeneres, on The Ellen DeGeneres Show. In June, Whitehall featured on the second annual Channel 4's Comedy Gala, which had been filmed in May. In June, he made a seventh appearance on 8 Out of 10 Cats.

In July 2011, Whitehall appeared alongside Lorraine Kelly on the Channel 4 show King Of..., presented by Claudia Winkleman. In July 2011, he made a sixth appearance on Mock the Week, and he appeared on the British version of The Marriage Ref with Jack Dee and Katherine Kelly. He was a guest on the Channel 4 show Chris Moyles' Quiz Night, presented by BBC Radio 1 DJ Chris Moyles, and in September made his second appearance on Would I Lie to You? Whitehall made his acting début in the Channel 4 comedy drama Fresh Meat, from the creators of Peep Show. In the series, Whitehall plays the role of J.P., a public school boy who failed to get into a "proper" university. The first series, in which he co-stars alongside Joe Thomas, ran until November 2011 and received critical acclaim. A second, third and fourth series aired on Channel 4 in the UK. In September, he and his father Michael appeared on The Million Pound Drop Live, presented by Davina McCall. On 30 November it was announced he would write and star in new BBC Three comedy Bad Education.

He landed a six-part entertainment series on Channel 4, called Hit The Road Jack, which started airing on 20 March 2012, following Whitehall on a comedy tour of the country. He became a regular panellist for the fifth series of A League of Their Own on Sky1 in 2012.

In 2012, Whitehall starred in a self-penned sitcom Bad Education on BBC Three, which began on 14 August, in which he plays Alfie, a teacher who is "the worst teacher ever to grace the British education system and is a bigger kid than the kids he teaches". The series also stars Mathew Horne as Fraser, the headmaster, Sarah Solemani as Miss Gulliver, the biology teacher, and Michelle Gomez as Miss Pickwell, the deputy head. Whitehall co-wrote and starred in the 2015 Bad Education Movie and returned for the 2022 reunion special.

On 30 November 2012, Whitehall was guest host of Have I Got News for You (season 44, broadcast 7). On 3 January 2013, he promoted his first DVD in an interview with Mark Lawson on BBC Radio 4's Front Row. On 24 November 2013 he acted in the Old Vic's charity gala '24 Hour Plays', where a series of ten-minute plays are written, rehearsed and performed within 24 hours. Also in 2013, Whitehall lent his voice to the Disney animated film Frozen as a troll priest named Gothi, but his lines were cut from the finished film.

In February 2014, Whitehall guest starred on Top Gear, having only driven a car once before, and drove on the Top Gear Test Track. In December 2014, he made a guest appearance in the second series of the Peter Gabriel spoof The Life of Rock with Brian Pern, broadcast on BBC Two. In 2015, he starred as posh backpacker Hugo in "La Couchette", the first episode of the second series of anthology series Inside No. 9.

On 24 October 2014, Whitehall was the presenter of the Feeling Nuts Movement's The Feeling Nuts Comedy Night on Channel 4, raising awareness of testicular cancer. In 2017 he presented Jack Whitehall: Travels with My Father, a travel documentary/road trip series in which he and his father Michael Whitehall spent five weeks in Thailand, Cambodia, and Vietnam. The show was released on Netflix. On 8 December 2017, Whitehall was announced as the next host of the BRIT Awards, taking over from 2017's hosts Dermot O'Leary and Emma Willis.

In May 2019, during the professional wrestling PPV AEW Double or Nothing, Whitehall introduced wrestling legend, Bret Hart, to the ring to unveil the new AEW World Championship.

=== Stand-up comedy ===
Whitehall started performing stand-up comedy at the Edinburgh Festival Fringe at the Pleasance Theatre's Comedy Reserve showcase. He had previously taken a sketch show to the Fringe called Comic Abuse. Whitehall won the Amused Moose Laugh Off 2007, and was runner-up in the Laughing Horse New Act of The Year competition, a finalist in So You Think You're Funny?, and winner of the Charlie Harthill Special Reserve in the same year. He was also nominated for 'Best Newcomer' in the 2008 Chortle Awards, and was a finalist in the Hackney Empire New Act of the Year.

In August 2009, Whitehall performed his first solo stand-up show, Nearly Rebellious, at the Edinburgh Festival Fringe. The same year, he was nominated for 'Best Newcomer' at the Edinburgh Comedy Awards. In September 2009, Whitehall was accused of stealing one of Stewart Lee's stand-up routines for his critically acclaimed Nearly Rebellious show. Lee had performed the joke, which deals with the subject of life after walking in space, at the Montreal Just for Laughs comedy festival in the 1990s, and was filmed for TV by the Comedy Network. When Whitehall recited his version of the routine at the Edinburgh Fringe in 2009, he was described by an otherwise favourable review for Metro as "repeating" Lee's sketch "almost verbatim".

On 20 October 2009, Robbie Williams was accused of stealing one of Whitehall's jokes in his much-publicised "comeback" performance as part of the BBC's electric proms at the Camden Roundhouse. When Whitehall originally performed the one-liner, which plays on the phrasal verb "to look down on someone", it was voted the fifth best joke of the year's Edinburgh Fringe in a poll conducted by TV channel Dave.

On 20 June 2010, a photograph of Whitehall appeared in the News of the World, purportedly showing him in possession of cocaine in Manchester. He quickly issued an apology for his behaviour, but did not confirm or deny the allegations. Later that same week, Whitehall appeared on the debut episode of Stand Up for the Week alongside fellow comedian Patrick Kielty, who took the opportunity to mockingly refer to the article.

On 30 March 2010, Whitehall took part in Channel 4's Comedy Gala, a benefit show held in aid of Great Ormond Street Children's Hospital, filmed live at The O2 Arena in London and broadcast on 5 April. Whitehall then appeared at the Montreal Just for Laughs comedy festival in July, and returned to the Edinburgh Fringe in August with his second solo show, entitled Learning Difficulties. On 27 September, Whitehall appeared at the Apollo, Hammersmith in front of a full audience for a recording of the sixth series of Live at the Apollo, which aired on 17 December. Also in 2010, he was picked out by Variety as one of their prestigious ten stars of the future.

In January 2011, Whitehall was nominated by the British Comedy Awards for 'Best Comedy Breakthrough'. On 12 March, he set a new Guinness World Records title together with Dara Ó Briain and Jon Richardson, for hosting the 'Highest stand-up comedy gig in the world', on a British Airways flight in support of Comic Relief. On 24 May, Whitehall took part in the second annual Channel 4's Comedy Gala, which aired on 10 June.

In August 2011, Whitehall performed two shows at the Edinburgh Festival Fringe. His third solo stand-up show in succession, Let's Not Speak of This Again. He also performed a series of four stand-up shows with his father Michael Whitehall, called Backchat, which was also completely sold out. Both received very favourable reviews.

He appeared in the first series of Dave's One Night Stand for the comedy network Dave. Recording a stand up performance at London's Haymarket Theatre. The show featured special guests as support.

In November 2011, Whitehall performed two sell out solo shows at the Hammersmith Apollo. These shows completed his debut national tour Let's Not Speak of This Again. Both shows again received highly favourable reviews.

On 30 December 2012, Whitehall appeared on The Big Fat Quiz of the Year, during which he made a joke about Queen Elizabeth II. On the next day, complaints were submitted about the joke to Ofcom. Ensuing media speculation led to the National Television Awards stating publicly that Whitehall would not be forced to resign from presenting the awards a short time later.

Whitehall took part in "A Show for Gareth Richards" at the Edinburgh Fringe Festival 2023, which was staged by fellow comedians Mark Simmons and Danny Ward to honour Richards' life after he died in a car-crash in April 2023. The show won the first Victoria Wood award at the Edinburgh Comedy Awards 2023 and the raised almost £20,000 for Gareth's family.

In 2025, Whitehall participated in Saudi Arabia's controversial Riyadh Comedy Festival, an event characterized by Human Rights Watch as an effort by the Saudi government to whitewash its human rights abuses. Hannah Jane Parkinson of the Guardian commented, "I remember Jack Whitehall doing a skit about 'grown adults getting wound up about cartoons'. Presumably he doesn't mind the grown adults who got so wound up by cartoons that they sentenced satirist Al Hazzaa to 23 years' jail time for lighthearted illustrations about fasting".

== Personal life ==
Whitehall met actress Gemma Chan in 2011, when she guest starred on the series Fresh Meat. They dated until December 2017.

Since 2020, Whitehall has been in a relationship with model Roxy Horner. In September 2023, they announced the birth of their first child, and the family resides in Notting Hill. On 21 December 2024, Horner announced on Instagram that she and Whitehall were engaged. The couple were married at Euridge Manor in Wiltshire on 18 April 2026. Whitehall wore a suit by Tom Ford, with Horner in a gown by the Israeli fashion brand Galia Lahav.

Whitehall is a supporter of Arsenal F.C. He is friends with sports promoter Tony Khan and has attended games of the Jacksonville Jaguars, which Khan’s father Shahid owns.

== Stand-up shows ==
| Year | Title | Notes |
|---|---|---|
| 2011–12 | Let's Not Speak of This Again | |
| 2014 | Gets Around | |
| 2017 | At Large | |
| 2019–20 | Stood Up | |
| 2023–24 | Settle Down | |
| 2027 | Bad Influence | Upcoming UK tour |

=== DVD releases ===
| Title | Released | Notes |
|---|---|---|
| Live | 19 November 2012 | at London's Hammersmith Apollo |
| Gets Around: Live from Wembley Arena | 24 November 2014 | Live at London's Wembley Arena |
| At Large | 24 October 2017 | Netflix special Live at London's Hammersmith Apollo |
| I'm Only Joking | 21 July 2020 | Netflix special Live at London's Wembley Arena |
| Settle Down | 30 January 2024 | Netflix special Live at London's O2 Arena |

== Filmography ==
=== Television ===
| Year | Title | Role | Notes |
|---|---|---|---|
| 1993 | The Good Guys | Guy McFadyean Jr. | Episode: "Old School Ties" |
| 1997 | Noah's Ark | Ben Wiston | Episode: "Paying the Price" |
| 2002 | Bertie and Elizabeth | Little boy | Television film; uncredited |
| 2002 | Goodbye, Mr. Chips | Student | Television film; uncredited |
| 2005 | Have I Been Here Before? | James Porter | 1 episode |
| 2008 | Ruddy Hell! It's Harry and Paul | Office worker | 1 episode |
| 2008 | Jesus Boy and the Goatherd | Jack | Television film; also writer |
| 2008 | Beehive | Various characters | 3 episodes |
| 2009 | The TNT Show | Himself | Presenter; 2 episodes |
| 2009–2011 | Mock the Week | Himself | Guest panellist; 7 episodes |
| 2010–2017, 2019 | A League of Their Own | Himself | Regular panelist, guest presenter (1 episode) |
| 2011 | Little Crackers | Robin | Episode: "Jack Whitehall's Little Cracker: Daddy's Little Princess"; also writer |
| 2011–2016 | Fresh Meat | J.P. | Main role; 30 episodes |
| 2012–2014, 2022–2023 | Bad Education | Alfie Wickers | Main role; 19 episodes; also creator, writer (17 episodes), associate producer (4 episodes) |
| 2013–2014 | Psychobitches | Maria Von Trapp; Sleeping Beauty's Prince; Diana Spencer | 3 episodes |
| 2013–2015 | Backchat | Himself | Presenter; 12 episodes |
| 2014 | Top Gear | Himself | "Star in a Reasonably-Priced Car" |
| 2014 | The Life of Rock with Brian Pern | Young Tony Pebble | Episode: "Jukebox Musical" |
| 2014 | An American Education | Alfie Wickers | Television movie pilot; also executive producer |
| 2015 | Inside No. 9 | Hugo | Episode: "La Couchette" |
| 2015 | Cockroaches | Oscar | 4 episodes |
| 2015 | The Royal Variety Performance | Himself | Presenter |
| 2015–2016 | Thunderbirds Are Go | Francois Lemaire (voice) | 3 episodes |
| 2016 | Drunk History | Sir Walter Raleigh | Episode: "Sir Walter Raleigh / Robin Hood & Maid Marian" |
| 2016 | Walliams & Friend | Various | Episode: "Jack Whitehall" |
| 2017 | Decline and Fall | Paul Pennyfeather | TV mini-series; 3 episodes |
| 2017 | Jack Whitehall: At Large | Himself | Stand-up Special |
| 2017–2019 | Bounty Hunters | Barnaby Walker | Main role; 7 episodes |
| 2017–2021 | Jack Whitehall: Travels with My Father | Himself | Presenter; also executive producer; 5 series |
| 2018 | 2018 Brit Awards | Himself | Presenter |
| 2018 | Jack Whitehall: Training Days | Himself | Presenter |
| 2018 | Urban Myths | Mark Feld | Episode: "David Bowie and Marc Bolan" |
| 2018 | Horizon | Himself | Narrator, episode: "Teenagers vs Cancer: A User's Guide" |
| 2018 | The Sidemen Show | Himself | Episode: "The Great Sidemen Race" |
| 2019 | 2019 Brit Awards | Himself | Presenter |
| 2019 | The Graham Norton Show | Himself | Guest presenter |
| 2019 | Good Omens | Newton Pulsifer, Thou-Shalt-Not-Commit-Adultery Pulsifer | TV mini-series; 5 episodes |
| 2019 | Who Do You Think You Are? | Himself | Alongside his father Michael, explores his ancestry |
| 2019 | Jack Whitehall: Christmas with My Father | Himself | Presenter |
| 2020 | Jack Whitehall: I'm Only Joking | Himself | Netflix Comedy Tour Special |
| 2020 | 2020 Brit Awards | Himself | Presenter |
| 2020 | Jack Whitehall's Father's Day | Himself | Presenter |
| 2020 | Jack Whitehall's Sporting Nation | Himself | Presenter |
| 2021 | 2021 Brit Awards | Himself | Presenter |
| 2021 | A League of Their Own Roadtrip: Loch Ness to London | Himself | Game show |
| 2021 | The KSI Show | Bearus (voice) | |
| 2022 | Got, Got, Need | Himself | |
| 2023 | Live Italian | Himself | With Maya Jama and Lawrence Dallaglio |
| 2023 | The Afterparty | Sebastian | Main role |
| 2024 | Jack Whitehall: Fatherhood with My Father | Himself | Presenter |
| 2024 | Jack In Time For Christmas | Himself | Presenter |
| 2025 | Malice | Adam Healey | Main role |
| 2025 | 2025 Brit Awards | Himself | Host |
| 2026 | 2026 Brit Awards | Himself | Host |
| 2026 | The 'Burbs | Rob Fisher | Main role |
| 2026 | Saturday Night Live UK | Himself (Host) | Episode: "Jack Whitehall/Jorja Smith" |
| 2026 | Nation's Dumbest | Himself | Host |

=== Film ===
| Year | Title | Role | Notes |
|---|---|---|---|
| 2013 | The Houdini Girl | —N/a | Short |
| 2013 | Frozen | Gothi – Troll Priest (voice) | Uncredited |
| 2015 | The Bad Education Movie | Alfie Wickers | Also writer |
| 2016 | Mother's Day | Zack Zimm | |
| 2016 | Asterix: The Mansions of the Gods | Asterix (voice) | English dub |
| 2018 | KSI: Can't Lose | Himself | Documentary |
| 2018 | The Nutcracker and the Four Realms | Harlequin | |
| 2019 | The Queen's Corgi | Rex (voice) | |
| 2019 | Luger | Tom | Short |
| 2021 | Jungle Cruise | McGregor Houghton | |
| 2021 | Clifford the Big Red Dog | Uncle Casey | |
| 2022 | Night at the Museum: Kahmunrah Rises Again | Octavius (voice) | |
| 2023 | Robots | Charles Cameron / C2 | |
| 2026 | Virginia Woolf's Night and Day | William | |
| TBA | Silent Retreat | Thomas | Post-production |
| TBA | Whodunnit | | Filming |
| TBA | The Fifth Wheel | | Filming |

== Awards and nominations ==
| Award | Date | Category | Work | Result | Ref. |
|---|---|---|---|---|---|
| 2009 | Edinburgh Comedy Awards | Best Newcomer | | Nominated | |
| 2010 | British Comedy Awards | Best Comedy Breakthrough | Mock the Week and 8 Out of 10 Cats | Nominated | |
| 2011 | British Comedy Awards | Best TV Comedy Actor | | Nominated | |
| 2012 | Monte-Carlo Television Festival | Golden Nymph - Outstanding Actor in a Comedy Series | Fresh Meat | Nominated | |
| 2012 | Broadcasting Press Guild | Breakthrough Award | Fresh Meat | Nominated | |
| 2012 | British Comedy Awards | King/Queen of Comedy | | Won | |
| 2013 | British Comedy Awards | King/Queen of Comedy | | Won | |
| 2013 | Broadcasting Press Guild | Breakthrough Award | Fresh Meat and Bad Education | Nominated | |
| 2013 | Royal Television Society Programme Awards | Comedy Performance | Fresh Meat | Nominated | |
