= Jack in Time for Christmas =

British Christmas television film comedy

- Genre: Comedy
- Starring: Jack Whitehall
- Country of origin: United Kingdom
- Original language: English

Production
- Production companies: Workerbee; Jackpot Productions

Original release
- Network: Amazon Prime Video
- Release: 3 December 2024

Jack in Time for Christmas is a British Christmas comedy movie on Amazon Prime Video starring Jack Whitehall and featuring a number of celebrity guest appearances including Jimmy Fallon, Rebel Wilson, Michael Bublé and Dave Bautista.

== Premise ==
Stuck in the United States just a few days prior to Christmas, Jack is desperate to return to the United Kingdom in time for the festivities.

== Cast ==
- Jack Whitehall
- Jimmy Fallon as Himself
- Rebel Wilson as Herself
- Michael Bublé as Himself
- Dave Bautista as Himself
- Daisy May Cooper as Taxi Driver
- Tom Davis as Himself

== Production ==
The comedy movie for Amazon Prime Video is part-scripted, part-travelogue and is produced by Workerbee and Jackpot Productions.

It features Jack Whitehall and appearances from Daisy May Cooper, Michael Bublé, Dave Bautista, Rebel Wilson and Jimmy Fallon. Filming took place in 2023. Jack Whitehall and Daisy May Cooper filmed in London in January 2024.

== Broadcast ==
The series was released on Amazon Prime Video on 3 December 2024.
