= Off the Kerb =

British talent agency company

Off The Kerb Productions Limited
- Founded: 1981
- Founder: Addison Cresswell
- Headquarters: London, United Kingdom
- Key people: Joe Norris; Addison Cresswell
- Website: offthekerb.co.uk

Off The Kerb Productions Limited is a British talent agency company that mainly works with comedians.

The company was owned by Addison Cresswell. The company is responsible for many comedians, including Jack Dee, Lee Evans, Jeremy Hardy, Jo Brand, Alan Carr, Marcus Brigstocke, Rich Hall, Michael McIntyre and negotiated an £18 million deal for Jonathan Ross. Prior to his death, Cresswell was also a director of Open Mike Productions and Little Mo Films, which both make comedy programming for British television.

They currently manage 56 artists and performers.

== Artists represented ==
- Tom Allen
- Charlie Baker
- Angela Barnes
- Rob Beckett
- Jo Brand
- Kevin Bridges
- Marcus Brigstocke
- Alan Carr
- Kelly Convey
- Marjolein Robertson
- Marlon Davis
- Tom Davis
- Jack Dee
- Joel Dommett
- Fatiha El-Ghorri
- Daniel Foxx
- Kerry Godliman
- John Gordillo
- Ivo Graham
- Kyrah Gray
- Rich Hall
- Adam Hills
- Harry Hill
- Phill Jupitus
- Josh Jones
- Rosie Jones
- Russell Kane
- Jessica Knappett
- George Lewis
- Jake Lambert
- Judi Love
- Christopher Macarthur-Boyd
- Susie McCabe
- Michael McIntyre
- Joanne McNally
- Dara Ó Briain
- Deirdre O'Kane
- Andy Parsons
- Romesh Ranganathan
- Peter Rethinasamy
- Jon Richardson
- Andy Robinson
- Jonathan Ross
- Suzi Ruffell
- Andrew Ryan
- Lindsey Santoro
- Elliot Steel
- Mark Steel
- Seann Walsh
- Josh Widdicombe
- Mike Wilmot
- Louise Young
