= Michael Whitehall =

British producer, agent and TV personality (born 1940)

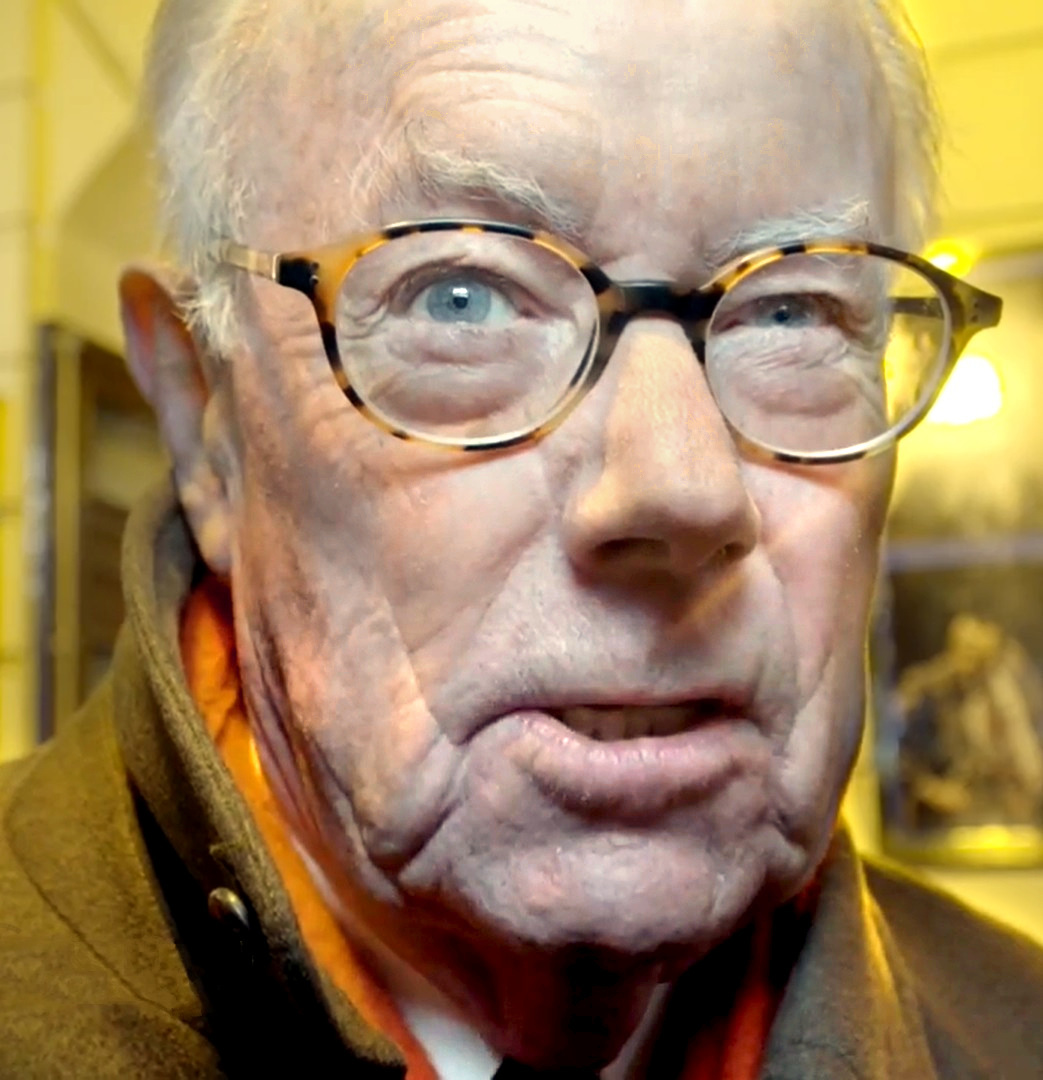
- Whitehall in 2016
- Born: 12 April 1940 (age 86); Exeter, Devon, England
- Education: Ampleforth College
- Occupations: Author; producer; talent agent; television personality
- Years active: 1988–present
- Political party: Conservative
- Spouses: Jane McIntosh (m. 1969; div. 1973) Hilary Amanda Jane Isbister (m. 1986)
- Children: 3, including Jack Whitehall

Michael Whitehall (born 12 April 1940) is an English author, producer, talent agent and television personality. He is a former theatrical agent who went on to form two production companies, Havahall Pictures (with Nigel Havers) in 1988, and Whitehall Films in 1998. He has represented Nigel Havers, Edward Fox, Colin Firth, Honor Blackman, Judi Dench and Daniel Day-Lewis. He is the father of comedian and actor Jack Whitehall.

== Early life and education ==
Michael Whitehall was born on 12 April 1940 in Exeter, Devon. He was educated at Ampleforth College, a Catholic boarding school in Yorkshire, run by Benedictine monks. Basil Hume, who later became Cardinal-Archbishop of Westminster, had served as a French teacher of his. After his education, Whitehall worked as a film reporter for The Universe, a weekly Catholic newspaper. Both his father, Jack, and grandfather were commercial travellers. His education was paid for by his grandfather, who had inherited significant wealth from his cousin, a wool merchant.

== Career ==
Whitehall has produced TV programmes such as Bertie and Elizabeth, Noah's Ark, Element of Doubt, The Good Guys and A Perfect Hero. He represented Judi Dench, Colin Firth, Richard E. Grant, and Leslie Grantham.

He has made guest appearances on various television shows including Countdown, John Bishop's Britain, The Million Pound Drop Live, Alexander Armstrong's Big Ask and Alan Carr: Chatty Man. In 2013, it was announced that he would present a TV chat show for the BBC with his son Jack. The first series of Backchat began airing on BBC Three, starting on 20 November 2013, but has since moved to BBC Two. In 2017, he co-presented Jack Whitehall: Travels with My Father, a travel documentary/road trip through Southeast Asia with his son on Netflix. In 2018, Travels had a second series where they visited several countries in Eastern Europe. In 2019, Travels had a third, two-episode series where they visited California, Arizona, and Nevada in the USA. In 2020, Travels had a fourth, two-episode series where they visited Australia. In 2021, Travels had a fifth, three-episode series, in which they traveled around the U.K. This series went on to be the final series of the show. In 2019, along with his son Jack, Michael appeared in the programme Who Do You Think You Are? to discover his heritage.

Whitehall's first book was Shark Infested Waters: Tales of an Actors' Agent, and his son Jack illustrated it. The Times Literary Supplement (TLS) called the book "a most entertaining memoir" that was "wittily illustrated". In October 2013, he released his second book Him & Me, which was co-written with his son. Written in two distinctive styles, it reflects the different personalities of its authors.

== Personal life ==
Whitehall married Jane McIntosh in 1969. The couple had no children and they divorced in 1973, after which McIntosh married lyricist Tim Rice.

Whitehall married television actress Hilary Amanda Jane Isbister (stage surname Gish) on 12 April 1986, Whitehall's 46th birthday. As of 2013, Whitehall and Isbister were living in Putney in the London Borough of Wandsworth. They have three children together, including Jack Whitehall.

== Books ==
- Shark Infested Waters: Tales of an Actors' Agent (Timewell Press, 2007), ISBN 978-1857252156
- Him & Me by Michael and Jack Whitehall (Michael Joseph, 2013), ISBN 978-1405910903
- Backing into the Spotlight: A Memoir (Constable, 2017), ISBN 978-1472127099

== Filmography ==
=== Television ===
Year	Title	Role	Notes
2013–2015	Backchat	Presenter	
2017–2021	Jack Whitehall: Travels with My Father	Presenter	Also Executive Producer, 4 series
2019	Jack Whitehall: Christmas with My Father	Himself	
2020	Jack Whitehall: Father's Day		
2023	Jon and Lucy's Odd Couples		
2024	Jack Whitehall: Fatherhood with My Father	Himself	
