= Extreme 19th =

Coordinates: 24°12.2′S 28°41.35′E

The Extreme 19th is the highest (400 metres or 1,300 feet) and longest (361 metres or 395 yards) par three golf hole in the world, located at the Legend Golf & Safari Resort in the Entabeni Safari Conservatory, Limpopo Province, South Africa. The hole was conceived by the property owners, Peet and Mart Cilliers, along with Graham Cooke of the UK, and David Riddle.

The tee, located at the top of Hangklip Mountain, is accessed only via helicopter. Because of its height, a tee shot takes almost 50 seconds to land. A spotter is given a rough direction via radio to look for the ball. The fairway is seeded with Cynodon grass, and has been landscaped to direct the ball towards the green, which has been shaped to resemble the continent of Africa. The green is surrounded by a large waste bunker.

The 19th is an addition to an 18-hole Signature Golf Course designed by professional golfers, including Pádraig Harrington, Trevor Immelman, Sergio García, Bernhard Langer, Colin Montgomerie, Justin Rose, Vijay Singh, K. J. Choi and Retief Goosen.

As of 28 March 2015, no one had scored a hole-in-one, but fourteen golfers had managed a birdie, including Lawrence Ahmed, professional cricketer Franklyn Stephenson, who was the first to do so. Of professional golfers to try the hole, Pádraig Harrington was the first ever to score par, while Raphaël Jacquelin, Justin Rose, Sergio García and K. J. Choi have all carded bogeys. Other notable par scorers include PGA Professional Ryan Gelbard and Formula One Champion Lewis Hamilton.

== Facts and figures ==
- Vertical height – 400 m.
- Horizontal distance - 361 m.
