= Rich Hall's Fishing Show =

- Genre: Comedy
- Written by: Rich Hall
- Directed by: Chris Cottam
- Starring: Rich Hall; Mike Wilmot
- Country of origin: United Kingdom
- Original language: English
- No. of series: 1
- No. of episodes: 6 (list of episodes)

Production
- Executive producer: Addison Cresswell
- Producer: Rob Baker
- Production location: Scotland
- Cinematography: Jeremy Hewson
- Production company: Open Mike Productions

Original release
- Network: BBC Four
- Release: 11 November – 16 December 2003

Rich Hall's Fishing Show is a comedy programme written by and starring Rich Hall and Mike Wilmot. It was first broadcast on 11 November 2003 in the United Kingdom on BBC Four. It was repeated in the UK on Dave in 2008. The Fishing with the Corleones sequence involving the late Anita Roddick was omitted from the repeat.

The show was set in the lochs of Scotland, on which Hall and Wilmot would go fishing. However, very few fish were caught, and the situation instead formed the setting for dialogue between the pair which would be vaguely themed on subjects like love or the Olympic Games. Some episodes featured sketches involving characters such as Bob, a decapitated limousine driver whose head had survived, and Charles Manson, a reclusive salesman who, despite his appearance, was not the convicted serial killer of the same name. Each episode would end with a celebrity guest who was invited on to the boat to talk and fish with the pair.

At the end of each show, a celebrity guest would appear and talk with Hall and Wilmot. The idea was seen earlier in a pilot the pair had called Rich Hall's Badly Funded Think Tank. In that show, the segment was titled "Fishing with the Corleones", but in the Fishing Show these sections are unappended.

== Episode list ==
The show was directed by Chris Cottam, with the writing of the episodes done by Hall.

No.	Title	Guest	Directed by	Written by	Original release date
1	"Travel"	John McCririck	Chris Cottam	Rich Hall	11 November 2003
2	"Love"	Germaine Greer	Chris Cottam	Rich Hall	18 November 2003
3	"Freedom"	Uri Geller	Chris Cottam	Rich Hall	25 November 2003
4	"Olympics"	Anita Roddick	Chris Cottam	Rich Hall	2 December 2003
5	"God"	Paul Daniels	Chris Cottam	Rich Hall	9 December 2003
6	"We Can't Afford To Do The Show"	N/A (Note: The guest was supposedly Justin Timberlake but it was Mike Wilmot dressed as him.)	Chris Cottam	Rich Hall	16 December 2003
