= Channel 4's Comedy Gala =

Annual British comedy benefit show

- Country of origin: United Kingdom

Production
- Production company: Open Mike Productions

Original release
- Network: Channel 4
- Release: 5 April 2010 – 29 May 2016

Channel 4's Comedy Gala is an annual British comedy benefit show organised by Channel 4 in aid of Great Ormond Street Children's Hospital. The show is filmed live at the O2 Arena in London, and then broadcast later by Channel 4. An inaugural gala was held in 2010, while a second gala was held in 2011. A third Gala aired in May 2012. A fourth Gala was filmed on Saturday 18 May 2013. A fifth Gala was confirmed on 24 February 2014 to be recorded on 16 May 2014 at the O2 Arena.

== History ==
The Comedy Gala was first commissioned by Channel 4 Entertainment Commissioning Editor, Syeda Irtizaali. Tickets first went on sale on 12 February 2010 for the live show at the O2 Arena, scheduled for 30 March 2010. With over 25 performers taking part, Channel 4 promoted the first gala as "the biggest live stand up show in United Kingdom history", and "the comedy event of the year". Hinting that there may be more Channel 4 Comedy Galas in the future, as Jack Dee closed the first show with the line "we'll see you next year, thank you and goodnight".

Hailing the first gig as a big hit both in terms of fund raising and for viewers, Irtizaali commissioned a second gala again at the O2, with tickets going on sale on 11 March 2011, and the gig scheduled for 24 May 2011.

All profits from ticket and DVD sales of the Comedy Galas go to Great Ormond Street Hospital Children's Charity. All performers waive their fees for the shows. The first gala raised nearly £1 million, enabling a new anaesthetic room to be built, while the second gala is to raise funds for a new £5m operating theatre. At every Gala during the ad breaks some adverts are hijacked by Alan Carr and/or Jimmy Carr.

== Galas ==
=== 2010 ===
The first gala took place at The O2 on 30 March 2010, and was broadcast on Channel 4 on 5 April 2010. It featured seventeen comedians performing stand-up, as well as a number of others performing live and pre-recorded sketches. Hosted by Alan Carr and Jonathan Ross, it featured extended stand-up sets by Michael McIntyre and Lee Evans.

=== 2011 ===
The second gala took place at The O2 on 24 May 2011, and broadcast on Channel 4 at 9pm on 10 June 2011. Several acts from the first gala were confirmed to appear in the second.

=== 2012 ===
The Comedy Gala 2012 was filmed on 11 May 2012 at the O2 Arena. It aired on Channel 4 on 20 May at 9pm starting the show with a live performance from Jessie J and, featuring in order of appearance: Alan Carr, Lee Nelson, Jack Dee, Keith Lemon, Jonathan Ross, Paul Chowdhry, Michael McIntyre, Jimeoin, Josh Widdicombe, Seann Walsh, Jack Whitehall, Andi Osho, Micky Flanagan, Jo Brand, Jon Richardson, Reginald D. Hunter, Lee Evans, Kevin Bridges and Sean Lock.

=== 2013 ===
The Comedy Gala 2013 was filmed on 18 May 2013 at the O2 Arena. It aired on Friday 7 June 2013 on Channel 4 as a two-hour show. Performing at the gala were Alan Carr, Miranda Hart, Kevin Bridges, Michael McIntyre, Russell Brand, Adam Hills, Warwick Davis, Jason Byrne, Jo Brand, Jonathan Ross, Josh Widdicombe, Jon Richardson, Jack Dee, Lee Evans, Nina Conti, Rhod Gilbert, Paul Chowdhry, Paddy McGuinness, Seann Walsh, Tom Stade, with taped videos from Noel Fielding, Keith Lemon, Terry Mynott and Jack Whitehall.

=== 2014 ===
The Comedy Gala 2014 was filmed on 16 May 2014 at the O2 Arena. It aired on 5 June 2014 on Channel 4 as a 2-hour and 40-minute show. Performers included Alan Carr, Lee Evans, Jonathan Ross, Adam Hills, Jack Dee, Jo Brand, Michael McIntyre, Jason Byrne, Seann Walsh, Jon Richardson, James Corden, Josh Widdicombe, Kevin Bridges, Sean Lock, Rob Beckett and Paul Chowdhry.

=== 2015 ===
The Comedy Gala 2015 was filmed on 15 May 2015 at the O2 Arena. It aired on Channel 4 later in the year. Performers included Alan Carr, Lee Evans, Jonathan Ross, Adam Hills, Jack Dee, Jo Brand, Michael McIntyre, Jason Byrne, Seann Walsh, Jon Richardson, Jason Manford, Josh Widdicombe, Kevin Bridges, Katherine Ryan, Aisling Bea, Romesh Ranganathan, Sara Pascoe, Sean Lock, and Shappi Khorsandi.

=== 2016 ===
The 2016 Comedy Gala aired on Channel 4 on 29 May and featured Aisling Bea, Alan Carr, Alex Brooker, Kevin Bridges, Nathan Caton, Hal Cruttenden, Rob Beckett, Joel Dommett, John Thomson, Josh Widdicombe, Kerry Godliman, Lee Nelson, Michael McIntyre, Russell Kane, Sean Lock, Shappi Khorsandi, Seann Walsh, Tom Allen, Warwick Davis and musician Jake Bugg.

== DVD releases ==
The first "Channel 4's Comedy Gala" event was released on Region 2 DVD by Universal Pictures, on 26 April 2010. The second event "Channel 4's Comedy Gala 2011", was released on DVD on 7 November 2011. On 5 November 2012, the third event "Channel 4's Comedy Gala 2012", was released on DVD. The fourth event "Channel 4's Comedy Gala 2013", was released on DVD on 18 November 2013. Since the tours ended in 2016, the remaining 4 Galas have not been released on DVD.

== See also ==
- List of stand-up comedians
