= King's Cup Elephant Polo =

King's Cup Elephant Polo is an elephant polo event played three times a year in Thailand, Sri Lanka, and Nepal.

In each match, two teams compete. Each team consists of five humans and five elephants. There is no monetary prize. Sponsors have included Johnnie Walker, PwC, Peroni, and IBM. PETA claims that at least eight other corporate sponsors have ended their support of the event due to its allegedly inhumane nature.

People for the Ethical Treatment of Animals (PETA) has targeted elephant polo as cruel and barbaric. Allegations of animal cruelty surfaced in Thailand during the 2018 King's Cup Polo.

The Thailand Elephant Polo Association announced in October 2018 that it would end polo matches in Thailand.
