= Commissioning editor =

Buyer for a publishing company

In book publishing, a commissioning editor is essentially a buyer. It is the job of the commissioning editor to advise the publishing house on which books to publish. Usually the actual decision of whether to contract a book is taken by a senior manager rather than the editor. Some magazines and broadcasting outlets also employ commissioning editors.

== Responsibilities ==
The other roles of commissioning editors vary between companies. Usually they are also responsible for ensuring that authors under contract deliver typescripts to specification and on time. They thus have an author management role. They usually have responsibility for ensuring that typescripts are of sufficient quality. In this, especially in textbook and reference publishing, commissioning editors may be assisted by development editors or assistant editors. Furthermore, in textbook companies, this role is responsible for managing title revisions, signing new authors, and ensuring products are profitable.

In some (usually small) companies, commissioning editors are also responsible for overseeing the copy-editing, typesetting, proofreading, and design of books, although in other companies this responsibility is assumed by other staff e.g. Managing Editors, House Editors, and Production Editors.

Commissioning editors are also often responsible for managing books that have already been published, for example by ensuring that stock levels are adequate and advising on when a book needs to be reprinted.

== Commissioning process ==
Commissioning editors may commission in a number of ways:

1. pro-actively: by thinking of ideas for books and then finding authors to write them
2. reactively: by reacting to book proposals or manuscripts
3. collaboratively: by formulating ideas in dialogue with authors
4. by republishing previously published books
5. by co-publishing ("buying in") books being published elsewhere or in other editions by other companies

== Role ==
Sometimes the phrase Acquisitions Editor is used. This is a near synonym for Commissioning Editor. Possibly the word "Acquisitions" implies more emphasis on types (4) and (5) above.

Commissioning has not been formulated into a profession. There is little formal training available. Recently there has been some attempt in the UK to articulate and establish professional standards. Most commissioning editors work up to the post through experience in other roles e.g. Editorial Assistant. Some editors see the post as a stepping stone to a senior management job (e.g. Publisher, Editorial Director, Publishing Director); others are content to remain in the post and to build a reputation as a star editor.

== Qualities ==
There is little consensus on what makes good commissioning editors, though most people in the industry would agree that the following are desirable and important:

- business acumen: understanding the market and the company's place in the market
- creativity
- linguistic sensitivity
- communicativeness
- project management skills
