= Kevin Bridges =

Scottish stand-up comedian (born 1986)

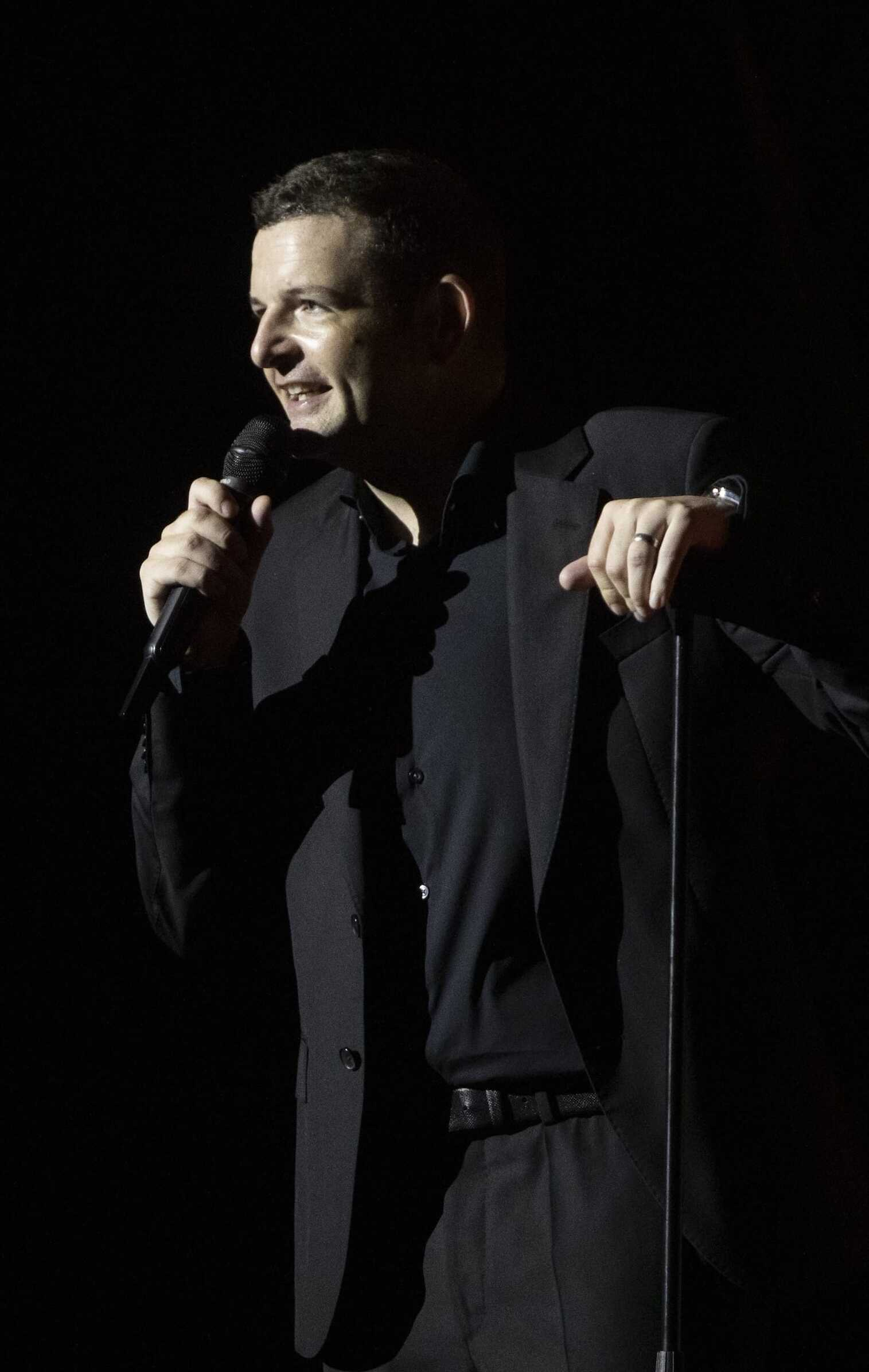
- Bridges in 2022
- Born: Kevin Andrew Bridges; 13 November 1986 (age 40); Clydebank, Dunbartonshire, Scotland
- Notable work: Stand Up for the Week; Live at the Apollo; Michael McIntyre's Comedy Roadshow
- Spouse: Kerry Monaghan (m. 2019)
- Children: 1

Comedy career
- Years active: 2002–present
- Medium: Stand-up, television, radio
- Genre: Observational comedy
- Subjects: Everyday life, family, human interaction, current events
- Website: www.kevinbridges.co.uk

Kevin Andrew Bridges (born 13 November 1986) is a Scottish stand-up comedian. He has appeared on many television panel shows, including Would I Lie to You?, Have I Got News for You, and has performed on Live at the Apollo and Michael McIntyre's Comedy Roadshow.

His 2012 television series Kevin Bridges: What's the Story? was based on his stand-up routines.

== Early life ==
Bridges is the son of Andy and Patricia Bridges and has a brother, John, who is ten years older. He grew up in the Hardgate area of Clydebank and attended St Mary's Primary and St Columba's High, where one of his teachers was John McGinn's mother.

== Career ==
=== Stand-up ===
Bridges began performing on stage when he left school shortly after turning 17, doing stand-up comedy gigs at The Stand Comedy Club in his hometown of Glasgow and then throughout the UK. He said he was inspired to try stand up after reading Frank Skinner's autobiography. At 18, he reached the final of Channel 5's So You Think You're Funny competition at the Edinburgh Fringe. In 2006, Bridges performed his first full-length solo show at the Glasgow International Comedy Festival, to a sold-out audience and much critical acclaim. Moving into bigger venues every year, Bridges sold out his hometown festival in 2007, 2008 and 2009. He performed at the 2008 Edinburgh Festival Fringe.

Bridges appeared on the BBC's Michael McIntyre's Comedy Roadshow, where he performed at the Edinburgh Playhouse. He returned to the Edinburgh Festival Fringe in 2009 with his show 'An Hour to Sing For Your Soul'. He was nominated for best newcomer in the Edinburgh Comedy Awards.

In 2010, Bridges took part in Channel 4's Comedy Gala, a benefit show held in aid of Great Ormond Street Children's Hospital, filmed live at the O2 Arena in London. He won the breakthrough award at the 2010 Chortle Awards.

Bridges's debut DVD, titled Kevin Bridges: The Story So Far... Live in Glasgow, filmed at Glasgow's SECC, was released on 22 November 2010, and went on to sell over 350,000 copies.

In 2012, Bridges embarked on his second stand-up tour of the UK, The Story Continues. The tour broke box office records, selling out the SECC five times and selling over 45,000 tickets on the first day. Bridges performed 136 dates during the tour, including ten sold-out shows at the SECC. His second DVD, titled The Story Continues... was released on 12 November 2012.

In 2015, Bridges embarked on his third stand-up tour of the UK, A Whole Different Story. The tour saw Bridges sell over 500,000 tickets across 145 dates, including 16 sold-out shows at The Hydro in Glasgow. During the tour, he recorded his third DVD, which went on to sell over 300,000 copies, including 40,000 in its first week, outselling fellow comedians Michael McIntyre and John Bishop.

Bridges became disillusioned with stand-up after his 145-night tour in 2015. After having a discussion with his father, he decided to take a sabbatical from performing. During this period he moved to Spain and was eventually inspired by the freedom he had to return to stand-up. When Bridges returned from Spain, he did "three or four" unannounced work-in-progress gigs to test out his new material.

After over a year away from stand-up, Bridges returned in 2018 with The Brand New Tour, which included a record 19 sold-out nights at The Hydro. Bridges was awarded the 'Gie it Laldy' award by the CEO of the Scottish Event Campus, in recognition for playing forty-six shows across the SEC Centre and The Hydro. He has also sold more tickets for the Scottish Event Campus than any other solo artist. His Brand New Tour was also voted the UK's Ticket of the Year in a poll conducted by Ticketmaster. Bridges is the first comedian to top the annual poll voted for by Ticketmaster customers.

=== Television ===
Bridges's television career started on Comedy Central UK, in April 2008, with a set on The World Stands Up. Shortly thereafter, he appeared on Comedy Store (also on Comedy Central). His performances on these shows and on the comedy circuit and at festivals led to his being given his first mainstream television break on 5 June 2009 on BBC One's Michael McIntyre's Comedy Roadshow. Bridges was critically commended for his performance. Over five million viewers saw his debut and his entire 25-night run at the Edinburgh festival sold out in hours, with extra shows being subsequently added and also selling out. Bridges went on to be nominated for the 2009 Edinburgh Comedy Awards (formerly Perrier) in the best newcomer category.

His TV work since then has included BBC One's Live at the Apollo and also a "Best of British Special" (episode 7 of the eighth series) of 8 out of 10 Cats, in July 2009. He also appeared in BBC 2 Scotland's Gary: Tank Commander (episode 6). Bridges appeared in Rab C Nesbitt in the first episode of the new series in 2010, on Mock the Week in February 2010, and has appeared twice in Would I Lie To You?. He was a guest on the BBC One show Friday Night with Jonathan Ross on 28 May 2010. Since June 2010, Bridges is a regular performer on Channel 4's Stand Up for the Week. His six-part BBC One series, Kevin Bridges: What's the Story?, began on 8 February 2012. He was asked to appear in I'm a Celebrity...Get Me Out of Here, but turned it down.

In 2014, BBC One commissioned three specials hosted by Bridges. Live At The Commonwealth, filmed at the Glasgow's Theatre Royal to coincide with the city hosting the 2014 Commonwealth Games, featured internationally renowned comedians from the Commonwealth. Live at the Referendum, also filmed at the Theatre Royal, brought together four of the UK's top comedians to give their views on the 2014 Scottish independence referendum. In the third special, Kevin Bridges: What's The Story – Referendum Special, Bridges took to the streets gathering grassroots opinions from across Scotland and beyond about the referendum.

=== Radio ===
On 6 March 2010, Bridges took part in the BBC Radio 5 Live show Fighting Talk, on which he came second behind Greg Brady, becoming the youngest person ever to appear on the show at the time (a record since broken by fellow comedian Jack Whitehall). In November 2010, he was also a contestant on BBC Radio 4's The Unbelievable Truth.

== Personal life ==
Bridges married Kerry Monaghan in 2019. In December 2022, Bridges announced the birth of his first child, a son, born in May of that year.

== Stand-up shows ==
Year	Title	Notes
2010	The Story So Far	
2012	The Story Continues	
2014–2015	A Whole Different Story	
2018	The Brand New Tour	
2022–2023	The Overdue Catch-Up	
2025	LIVE - USA and Canada Tour 2025	
2026	Here If You Need Me	

=== DVD releases ===
Title	Released	Notes
The Story So Far...Live in Glasgow	22 November 2010	Live at Glasgow's SEC Centre
The Story Continues...	12 November 2012	Live at Glasgow's SEC Centre
A Whole Different Story...Live 2015	23 November 2015	Live at Glasgow's SSE Hydro
The Brand New Tour – Live	7 December 2018	Live at Glasgow's SSE Hydro
The Overdue Catch-Up – Live	4 December 2023	Live at Cork's Opera House

== Filmography ==
List of acting performances in film and television
Year	Title	Role	Notes
2009	8 Out of 10 Cats	Himself	
2009	Gary: Tank Commander	Eddy	Television acting debut Episode: Stagging On
2009–2010	Michael McIntyre's Comedy Roadshow	Himself	
2010	Sports Relief 2010	Himself	
2010	Channel 4's Comedy Gala	Himself	
2010	Rab C. Nesbitt	Mambo	Episode: Heal
2010	You Have Been Watching	Himself	
2010	Friday Night with Jonathan Ross	Himself	
2010	Comedy Central at the Comedy Show	Himself	
2010	Breakfast	Himself (comedian)	
2010	Mock the Week	Himself	
2010–2011	Stand Up for the Week	Host	
2010–2011	Grouchy Young Men	Himself	Television series
2010–2011	Would I Lie to You?	Himself	
2010–2012	Live at the Apollo	Himself	
2010–2016	Have I Got News For You	Himself	
2011	That Sunday Night Show	Himself	
2011	Red Nose Day 2011	Presenter	
2011	BAFTA Scotland Awards	Host	
2011–2019	A League of their Own	Himself	
2012	Kevin Bridges: What's the Story?	Himself	Also writer and producer, Television special
2014	Kevin Bridges Live At..	Himself	
2014–2020	8 Out of 10 Cats Does Countdown	Himself	Contestant; Team Captain
2017	All Round to Mrs. Brown's	Himself	Interviewed guest

== Awards and nominations ==
Year	Nominee / work	Award	Result
2012	Kevin Bridges: What's the Story?	Best Writer	Nominated

== Bibliography ==
=== Non-fiction ===
- We Need to Talk About . . . Kevin Bridges (Penguin, 2014)

=== Novels ===
- The Black Dog (Wildfire, 2022)
