= Rich Hall =

American comedian, writer and musician (born 1954)

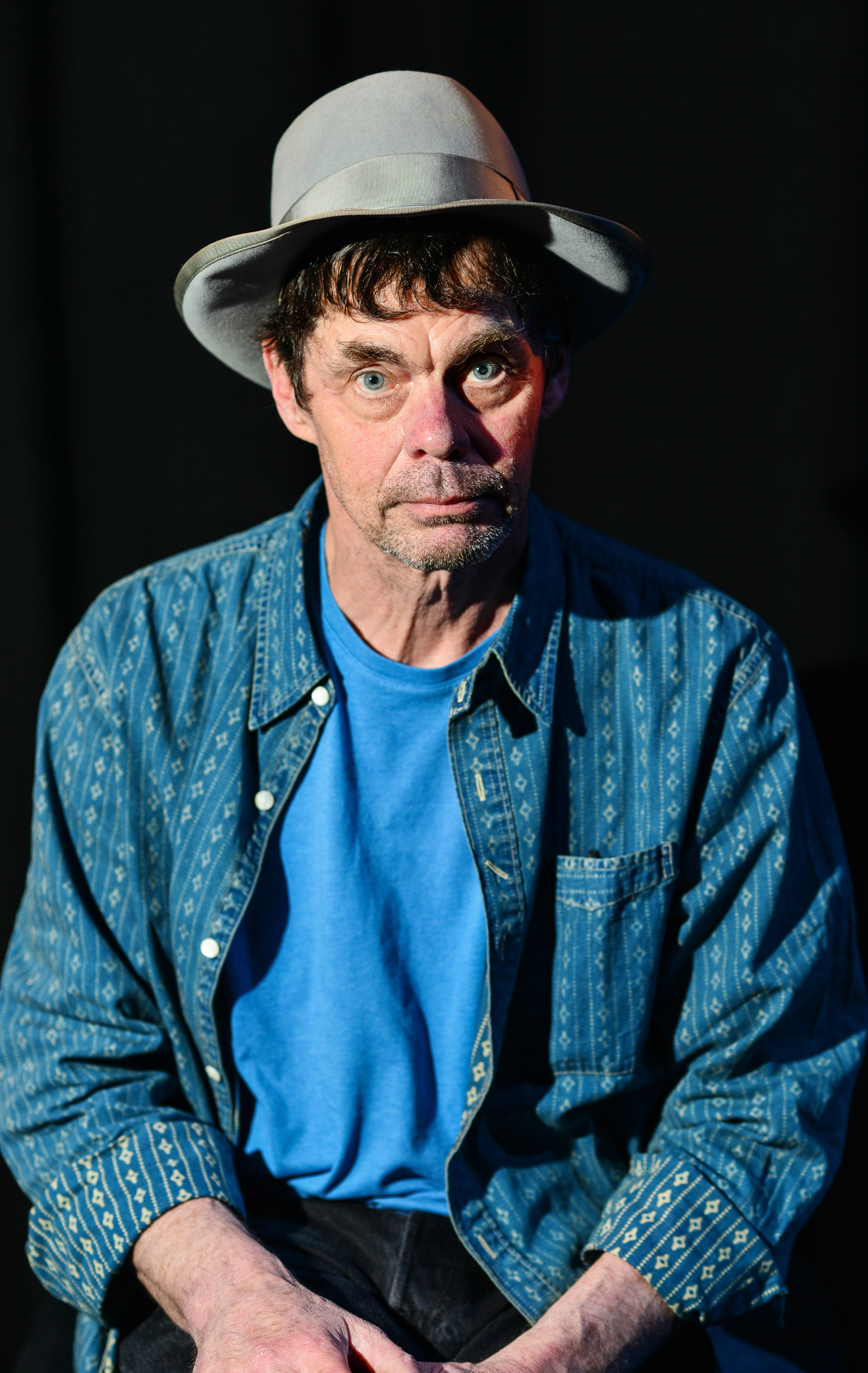
- Hall in 2016
- Born: Richard Travis Hall; June 10, 1954 (age 72); Alexandria, Virginia, U.S.
- Other name: Otis Lee Crenshaw
- Notable work: QI, Saturday Night Live, Fridays, Late Show with David Letterman
- Spouse: Karen Hall (m. 2005)
- Children: 2

Comedy career
- Years active: 1979–present
- Medium: Stand-up, television
- Genres: Observational comedy, deadpan, political satire
- Subjects: American culture, British culture, United States politics, British politics
- Hall's voice from the BBC programme Front Row, 22 June 2009

Richard Travis Hall (born June 10, 1954) is an American comedian, writer, director, actor, and musician, first coming to prominence as a sketch comedian in the 1980s. He wrote and performed for a range of American networks, in series such as Fridays, Not Necessarily the News (popularising the "sniglet" neologism), and Saturday Night Live.

After winning a Perrier Comedy Award in 2000, using the character of Tennessee country musician Otis Lee Crenshaw, Hall became popular in the United Kingdom, regularly appearing on QI and similar panel shows. He has created and starred in several series for the BBC, including comedies with Mike Wilmot and documentaries often concerning cinema of the United States. Hall has also maintained a successful stand-up comedy career, as both Crenshaw and himself.

== Early life ==
Richard Hall was born in Alexandria, Virginia, and grew up in Charlotte, North Carolina. He says he is of partial Cherokee descent. Early in his career, he performed as a street comedian with a suitcase and stand, traveling the college circuit and performing impromptu skits for gathering crowds. He attended Western Carolina University from 1972 to 1975, but did not graduate.

== Career ==
=== United States ===
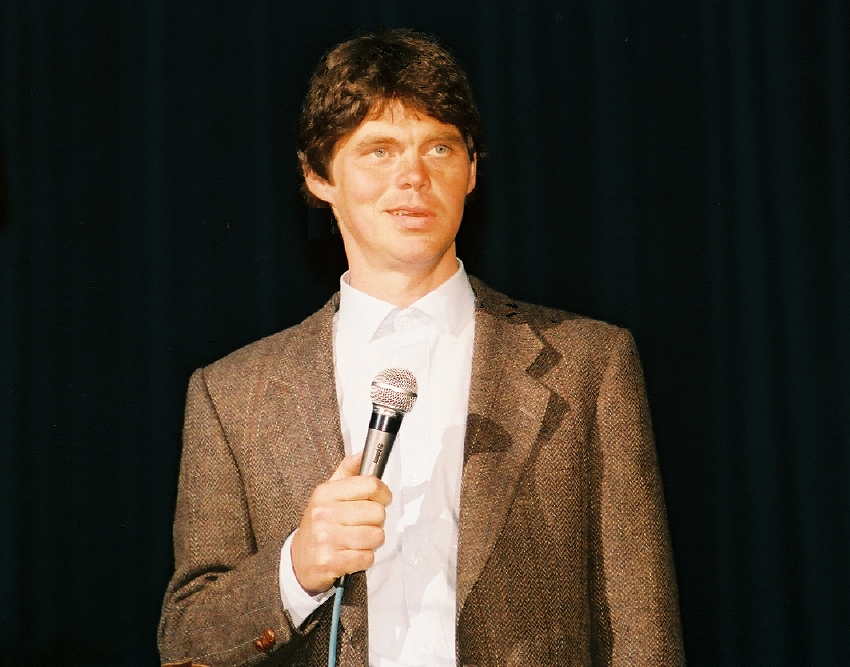
Hall performing at the Tower Theatre in Upper Darby Township, Pennsylvania in 1986.

Hall's first professional work was as a writer and performer on the original daytime David Letterman Show, for which he won the 1981 Emmy Award for Outstanding Individual Achievement - Writing, and the sketch comedy TV series Fridays, becoming a cast member on that show during its third and final season. After the end of Fridays, Hall co-wrote and starred in the satirical comedy series Not Necessarily the News from 1983 until 1990 where he coined the term "sniglet" to describe newly created words and collected and published several volumes of books of them.

He was also a regular on Saturday Night Live for the show's tenth season (1984–1985), becoming the only Fridays cast member to be an SNL cast member.

In 1986, Hall had his own Showtime channel special, Vanishing America, which was turned into a book with the same title. He hosted a talk show during The Comedy Channel's 1990–91 season, titled Rich Hall's Onion World.

In the United States, he has appeared several times on American talk shows such as The Tonight Show Starring Johnny Carson, Late Show with David Letterman, and Late Night with Conan O'Brien.

Hall made a special guest appearance as himself in the Cartoon Network talk show Space Ghost Coast to Coast.

In 2011, Hall voiced an Idaho man in Sony Pictures Animation's Arthur Christmas.

=== United Kingdom ===
Outside the US, Hall has also achieved popularity in the United Kingdom. He spends part of his time writing plays in the United States, where he has a small ranch just outside Livingston, Montana. The rest of the time is spent in London, where he owns a flat.

Hall is a guest on popular BBC panel quiz shows, most notably as a regular guest on QI, and also with appearances in 8 Out of 10 Cats, Have I Got News for You and Never Mind the Buzzcocks. He has also appeared on the British stand-up comedy series Jack Dee's Live at the Apollo. In 2006, Hall also wrote and acted in the play Levelland at the Edinburgh Festival.

Hall has had four BBC TV series of his own: Rich Hall's Badly Funded Think Tank, Rich Hall's Fishing Show in 2003, Rich Hall's Cattle Drive in 2006, as well as a one-off programme about the 2004 United States presidential election, Rich Hall's Election Special. He also appeared on the BBC Two programme Top Gear, where he successfully managed to make a song about a Rover 25 car, much to the enjoyment of host Jeremy Clarkson and the audience. After the September 11 attacks, Hall was entrusted with the task of responding to the tragedy on the first subsequent edition of Have I Got News for You.

Hall has written and presented 90-minute documentaries about American film genres, culture and history, broadcast on BBC Four. Initially these documentaries focused on film genres: Rich Hall's How the West Was Lost (first broadcast June 2008) discusses Westerns, Rich Hall's The Dirty South (October 2010) challenges stereotypical Hollywood presentations of the Southern United States, Rich Hall's Continental Drifters (November 2011) examines the American road movie, Rich Hall's Inventing the Indian (October 2012) discusses portrayals of Native Americans. His subsequent documentaries cover broader aspects of American culture and politics: Rich Hall's You Can Go to Hell, I'm Going to Texas (June 2013) and Rich Hall's California Stars (July 2014) focus on Texas and California respectively, Rich Hall's Presidential Grudge Match (broadcast 7 November 2016, the day before the 2016 United States presidential election) is a history of US Presidents and their election campaigns, Rich Hall's Countrier Than You (March 2017) discusses country music, Rich Hall's Working for the American Dream (July 2018) questions the attainability of the American Dream, and Rich Hall's Red Menace (November 2019) is about the Cold War.

In 2007, he returned to the Fringe with his second play, Best Western, which he wrote and directed. His autumn 2009 tour included a performance at London's Hammersmith Apollo, which was recorded and released in November 2009 as a live DVD.

In 2009, he performed at the Edinburgh Festival Fringe in two shows, his solo stand up and also with longtime collaborator Mike Wilmot and Montana-based actor Tim Williams in a new play entitled Campfire Stories.

On April 5, 2010, Hall appeared as one of the stand-up acts on Channel 4's Comedy Gala, a benefit show organized by Channel 4 to raise money for Great Ormond Street Children's Hospital.

Hall was a regular performer on Channel 4's Stand Up for the Week, which began in June 2010.

In January 2015, Hall started a comedy tour of the UK called 3:10 to Humour.

Hall also frequently appears in episodes of Very British Problems.

=== Other appearances ===
Hall made an Irish TV appearance as a guest on the fifth series of RTÉ's topical news comedy programme, Don't Feed the Gondolas, and has appeared at the Kilkenny Cat Laughs comedy festival on 15 occasions. He has also performed at the West Belfast Festival/Feile an Phobail, one of the largest community festivals in Ireland, to a sell-out audience where he received widespread critical acclaim. He appeared in several Pizza Hut commercials in the 1980s, mainly promoting Pizza Hut's guarantee of serving each customer within five minutes.

Hall has achieved some popularity in Australia, regularly appearing at the Melbourne International Comedy Festival and the Adelaide Fringe, and on Australian comedy panel shows such as The Glass House and Spicks and Specks.

Hall appeared at the Garvey 1989 Celebrity Ski Classic and at the Altitude Comedy Festival 2008 in the ski resort of Meribel in France. He also appeared – albeit briefly – in the 2006 Cheap Seats episode titled "Steve Garvey Celebrity Skiing".

From 2015 onwards, Hall has lent his voice as Captain Taylor in the ITV series Thunderbirds Are Go, with the character first appearing in the episode "Relic". The character made further appearances in show's second and third season.

Hall is a frequent guest panelist on the British panel show QI, having appeared 25 times on the show. He has also won more episodes (10) than any other guest panelist.

== Otis Lee Crenshaw ==
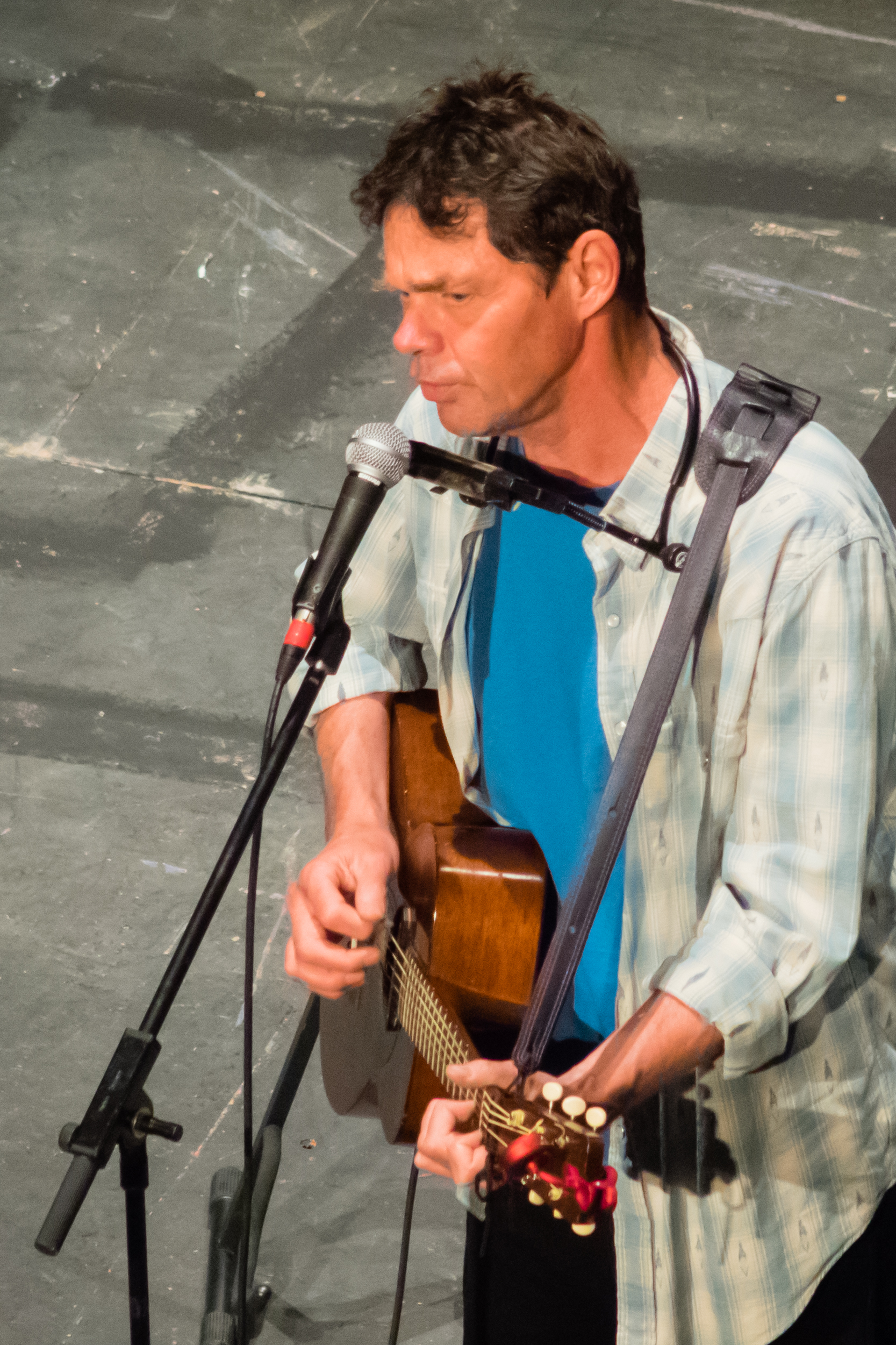
Hall performing at York Theatre Royal, in 2014

In 2000, he won the Perrier Comedy Award at the Edinburgh Fringe, under the guise of his own grizzled uncle, Otis Lee Crenshaw, the much-convicted country music singer.

He has released several albums, including How Do We Do It? Volume! in 2003, and a concert video, as this character. The first album, London Not Tennessee, in 2001, was recorded on the first comedy tour, and includes two duets on stage with US singer Catherine Porter. In 2004, he published a book of the man's memoirs, entitled Otis Lee Crenshaw: I Blame Society, and in 2007 he finished a screenplay for a film based on the book, written for the director Mel Smith.

In 2008, Hall toured two stand-up shows around the UK: Rich Hall Autumn Tour 2008 played around 45 dates and headlined as his alter-ego in a show entitled Otis Lee Crenshaw and Band, with Rich Hall listed as a "special guest". He subsequently toured a version of this show throughout the UK and Ireland in 2009, with longtime sidekick Myron T. Buttram (guitarist and pedal steel player, Rob Childs) and Lonesome Dave (banjoist and guitarist, David Lindsay) appearing at the 2009 Adelaide Fringe festival, the Sydney Opera House, and the 2009 Melbourne Comedy festival. The band was originally credited as The Black Liars and was renamed The Honky Tonk A**holes when joined by Horst Furst II (bassist Nigel Portman Smith) and drummer Mark Hewitt.

== Personal life ==
Hall married his wife Karen – a filmmaker from Liverpool – in 2004. The couple have two children and reside in London.

== Musical and literary career ==
=== Filmography ===
- Police Academy 2: Their First Assignment (1985) – Street Punk #1 (uncredited)
- One Crazy Summer (1986) – Wilbur
- Million Dollar Mystery (1987) – Slaughter Buzzard
- C.H.U.D. II: Bud the C.H.U.D. (1989) – Stan
- The Lives of the Saints (2006) – Club Performer
- Arthur Christmas (2011) – Idaho Man (voice)

==== TV ====
- Saturday Night Live (1984-1985)
- Vanishing America (1986)
- Monsters, episode 15, "Their Divided Self" (1989)
- Rich Hall's TV Dinner Party (1990)
- Rich Hall's Fishing Show (2003)
- Rich Hall's Cattle Drive (2006)
- Rich Hall's How the West Was Lost (first broadcast June 2008)
- Rich Hall's The Dirty South (October 2010)
- Rich Hall's Continental Drifters (November 2011)
- Rich Hall's Inventing the Indian (October 2012)
- Rich Hall's You Can Go To Hell, I'm Going To Texas (June 2013)
- Rich Hall's California Stars (July 2014)
- Rich Hall's Presidential Grudge Match (November 2016)
- Rich Hall's Countrier Than You (March 2017)
- Rich Hall's Working for the American Dream (July 2018)
- Rich Hall's Red Menace (November 2019)
- Elliott from Earth (2021) – Kane (voice)

==== Radio ====
- In Search of Southern Hospitality

=== Discography ===
- London Not Tennessee (with The Black Liars) (2001)
- How Do We Do It? Volume! (2003)
- Waitin' On A Grammy (2016)

=== Bibliography ===
- 1984: Sniglets (Snig'Lit: Any Word That Doesn't Appear in the Dictionary, but Should), ISBN 0-02-012530-5
- 1985: More Sniglets: Any Word That Doesn't Appear in the Dictionary, but Should
- 1986: Unexplained Sniglets of the Universe
- 1986: Rich Hall's Vanishing America, ISBN 0-02-547480-4
- 1987: Angry Young Sniglets (1987)
- 1989: When Sniglets Ruled the Earth (1989)
- 1994: Self Help for the Bleak: Attaboy Therapy, ISBN 0-8431-3669-3
- 2002: Things Snowball, ISBN 0-349-11576-1
- 2003: Top Gear (2003)
- 2004: Otis Lee Crenshaw: I Blame Society, ISBN 0-349-11818-3
- 2009: Magnificent Bastards, ISBN 0-349-11965-1
- 2022: Nailing It! Tales From The Comedy Frontier, ISBN 978-1-52942-243-6, 978-1-52942-244-3, 978-1-52942-246-7
