= The Big Fat Quiz of the Year =

Annual British comedy TV panel show

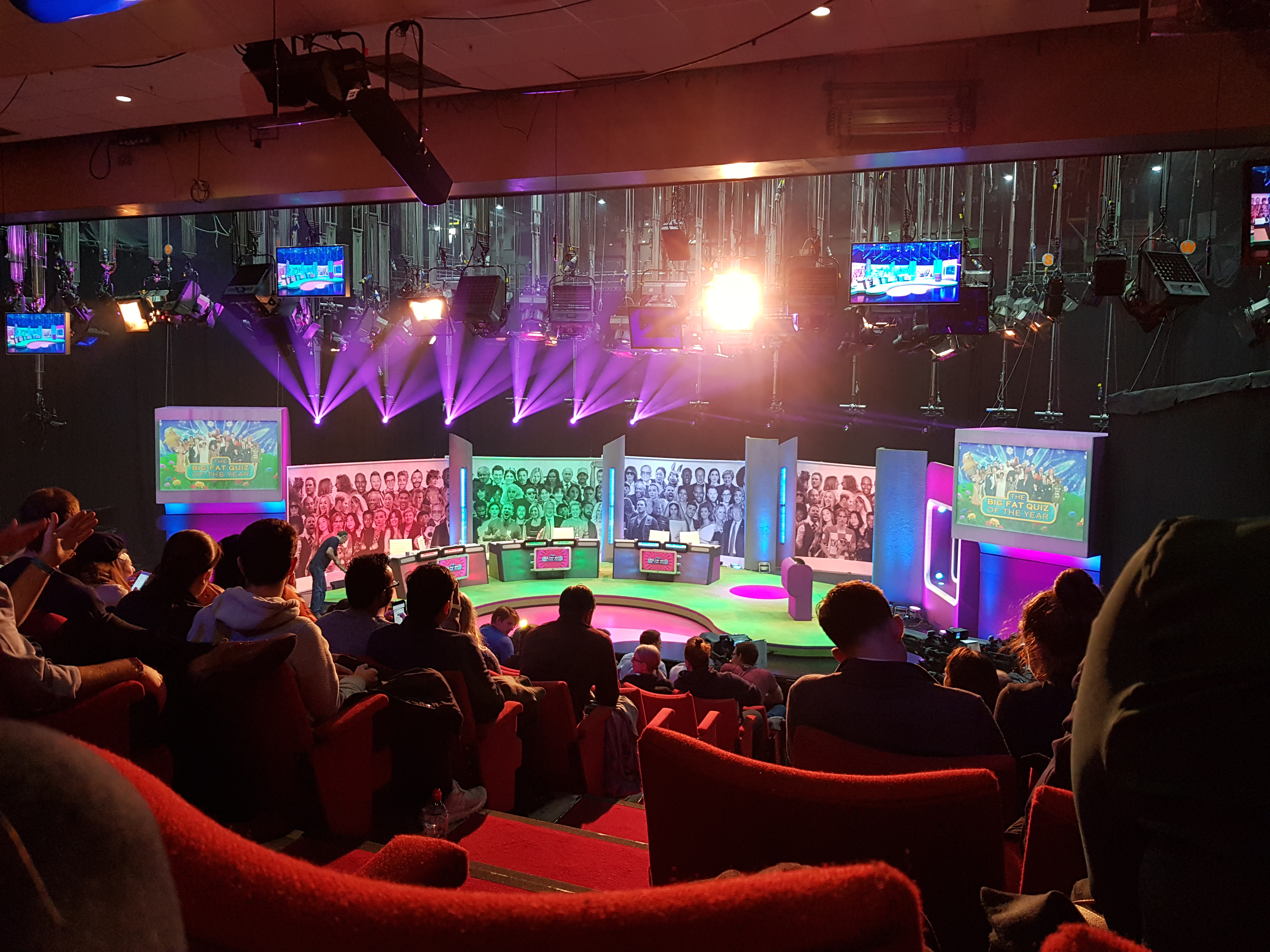
- Studio view of The Big Fat Quiz of the Year set at BBC Elstree Centre.
- Presented by: Jimmy Carr
- Country of origin: United Kingdom
- Original language: English
- No. of episodes: 43 (list of episodes)

Production
- Producers: Anthony Cavenney (2004); Jane Goldman (2004–06); Emily Dean (2005–06); Juliet Redden (2016–2023)
- Production locations: Television Centre, London (2004–12, 2017, 2023–); Elstree Studios (2013, 2019); The London Studios (2014–16); BBC Elstree Centre (2018)
- Running time: 90–130 minutes
- Production company: Hotsauce TV

Original release
- Network: Channel 4
- Release: 28 December 2004 – present

The Big Fat Quiz of the Year is an annual British television programme broadcast at the end of the year on Channel 4. The show is a comedy panel game in the style of a pub quiz. Three teams of two celebrities, mostly comedians, are asked questions about the year gone by in various categories, writing answers on an electronic board in front of them. At the end of each round the answers are displayed and points awarded.

The first edition was broadcast on the 28th December 2004 and it has been held every year since on approximately the same date in December. An exception to this has been the years of 2009 and 2010 when it was held in early January of the following year. In November 2007 the first special edition aired for Channel 4's 25th anniversary celebration. Three special editions then aired in September 2012, to celebrate Channel 4's 30th anniversary and the questions that were asked in each episode were about a particular decade. A second set of 'decades' editions screened in September 2013 and a special edition to mark the 10th anniversary of the Big Fat Quiz aired in January 2015.

A new series titled the Big Fat Quiz of Everything first aired in January 2016 and the questions were based on a broad range of subjects including history, geography, sport, film, television, science, technology, music, art and literature.

Stand-up comedian Jimmy Carr has been the host and quizmaster of each edition to date and Richard Ayoade and Jonathan Ross have made the most appearances with 21 each. Repeats can usually be found days later on Channel 4's sister channel E4 and/or 4seven and Channel 4 has made full episodes of The Big Fat Quiz of the Year available to view on All 4.

== Editions ==
#	Original airdate	Edition
1	28 December 2004	of the Year (2004)
2	26 December 2005	of the Year (2005)
3	27 December 2006	of the Year (2006)
4	2 November 2007	Anniversary (Channel 4's 25th)
5	30 December 2007	of the Year (2007)
6	28 December 2008	of the Year (2008)
7	1 January 2010	of the Year (2009)
8	3 January 2011	of the Year (2010)
9	27 December 2011	of the Year (2011)
10	16 September 2012	of the 80s (1st)
11	23 September 2012	of the 90s (1st)
12	30 September 2012	of the 00s (1st)
13	30 December 2012	of the Year (2012)
14	22 September 2013	of the 80s (2nd)
15	29 September 2013	of the 90s (2nd)
16	26 December 2013	of the Year (2013)
17	26 December 2014	of the Year (2014)
18	2 January 2015	Anniversary (TBFQ's 10th)
19	26 December 2015	of the Year (2015)
20	5 January 2016	of Everything (1st)
21	15 August 2016	of Everything (2nd)
22	22 August 2016	of Everything (3rd)
23	28 August 2016	of Everything (4th)
24	26 December 2016	of the Year (2016)
25	6 January 2017	of Everything (5th)
26	26 December 2017	of the Year (2017)
27	12 January 2018	of Everything (6th)
28	26 December 2018	of the Year (2018)
29	4 January 2019	of Everything (7th)
30	26 December 2019	of the Year (2019)
31	2 January 2020	of the Decade (2010s)
32	26 December 2020	of the Year (2020)
33	7 January 2021	of Everything (8th)
34	26 December 2021	of the Year (2021)
35	3 April 2022	of Everything (9th)
36	26 December 2022	of the Year (2022)
37	14 May 2023	of Sport
38	26 December 2023	of the Year (2023)
39	23 August 2024	of Telly (1st)
40	27 December 2024	of the Year (2024)
41	2 January 2025	of Everything (10th)
42	26 December 2025	of the Year (2025)
43	9 January 2026	of Telly (2nd)

== Cast ==
The following have all appeared as one of the guest panelists on the show. This does not include Jimmy Carr, who has hosted all episodes to date, nor does it include anyone who made pre-recorded appearances.

21 appearances

- Jonathan Ross
- Richard Ayoade

15 appearances

- David Mitchell

13 appearances

- Noel Fielding

9 appearances

- Claudia Winkleman

8 appearances

- Katherine Ryan

7 appearances

- Rob Brydon
- Roisin Conaty

5 appearances

- Alan Carr
- Dara Ó Briain
- Jack Whitehall
- Judi Love

4 appearances

- David Walliams
- Mel Giedroyc
- Rob Beckett
- Russell Brand
- Sarah Millican

3 appearances

- Bob Mortimer
- Joe Lycett
- Kevin Bridges
- Nish Kumar

2 appearances

- Adam Buxton
- Aisling Bea
- Big Narstie
- Carol Vorderman
- Chelsea Peretti
- Denise Van Outen
- Eddie Izzard
- Frank Skinner
- Harry Hill
- Jack Dee
- James Acaster
- James Corden
- Jo Brand
- Joanne McNally
- Kristen Schaal
- Maisie Adam
- Maya Jama
- Michael McIntyre
- Micky Flanagan
- Miranda Hart
- Mo Gilligan
- Phil Jupitus
- Romesh Ranganathan
- Rosie Jones
- Russell Howard
- Stacey Solomon
- Tom Allen

== The Big Fat Quiz of the Year ==
#	Original airdate	Edition	U.K. ratings (millions)
1	27 December 2004	2004	2.14
2	26 December 2005	2005	2.52
3	27 December 2006	2006	3.07
4	30 December 2007	2007	3.59
5	28 December 2008	2008	3.53 (Note: 3.10 million on Channel 4 and 431,000 on Channel 4 +1.)
6	1 January 2010	2009	4.24 (Note: 3.78 million on Channel 4 and 458,000 on Channel 4 +1.)
7	3 January 2011	2010	3.85 (Note: 3.34 million on Channel 4 and 507,000 on Channel 4 +1.)
8	27 December 2011	2011	4.35 (Note: 3.89 million on Channel 4 and 464,000 on Channel 4 +1.)
9	30 December 2012	2012	4.11 (Note: 3.42 million on Channel 4 and 688,000 on Channel 4 +1.)
10	26 December 2013	2013	3.70 (Note: 3.16 million on Channel 4 and 538,000 on Channel 4 +1.)
11	26 December 2014	2014	3.49 (Note: 3.12 million on Channel 4 and 369,000 on Channel 4 +1.)
12	26 December 2015	2015	3.72 (Note: 3.28 million on Channel 4 and 441,000 on Channel 4 +1.)
13	26 December 2016	2016	3.09
14	26 December 2017	2017	3.65
15	26 December 2018	2018	3.64
16	26 December 2019	2019	3.61
17	26 December 2020	2020	3.95
18	26 December 2021	2021	TBC
19	26 December 2022	2022	TBC
20	26 December 2023	2023	3.17
21	27 December 2024	2024	3.69
22	26 December 2025	2025	3.55

=== 2004 ===
Name	Team	
Cut the Funk	Simon Pegg	Liza Tarbuck
BJ and The Bear	David Walliams	Rob Brydon
The Winners	June Sarpong	Jonathan Ross

The first Big Fat Quiz was broadcast on 27 December 2004. Louis Walsh, Nadia Almada and Dame Kelly Holmes all made live appearances to read out the answers for the months of March, June and August respectively. Recorded questions from Bono, Derren Brown and The Bear from Bo' Selecta! were shown too along with films of Richard and Judy discussing events. The children of Mitchell Brook Primary School in Neasden acted out news stories that happened throughout the year, such as Ricky Gervais winning two Golden Globe Awards for The Office and the Momart fire.

=== 2005 ===
Name	Team	
The A-List	Sharon Osbourne	Jonathan Ross
The Double Ds	David Mitchell	Denise van Outen
Can't Cook, No Need to 'Cos I'm Sat Next to Gordon Ramsay	Gordon Ramsay	Rob Brydon

Guest questioners in the studio included Jordan & Peter Andre and David Tennant. There were also recorded questions by several celebrities including Richard and Judy, Charlotte Church, Cameron Diaz, Toni Collette, Derren Brown and Kevin Pietersen. The mystery guests were Walter Wolfgang and a woman genuinely named Sue Doku. This year's quiz saw the debut of Jon Snow giving fake news stories based on song lyrics, with "I Predict A Riot" and "Crazy Chick". The children of Mitchell Brook Primary School acted out the birth of David and Victoria Beckham's third child and Jacques Chirac insulting British food on the eve of the G8 Summit.

=== 2006 ===
Name	Team	
Raven Spawn / Rod's Progeny / The Goth Detectives	Russell Brand	Noel Fielding
Rob & Dave	Rob Brydon	David Walliams
The Conventionally Attractive Team	Jonathan Ross	Cat Deeley

In 2006, the show was broadcast on 27 December. Guest questioners in the studio included Boy George, Myleene Klass and Matt Willis. The mystery guest was Guy Goma, famous for mistakenly appearing as a guest on BBC News 24. Pre-recorded questions were asked by Lily Allen, Carol Vorderman, Courtney Love, Girls Aloud, and Sacha Baron Cohen (in character as Borat). Channel 4 News reporter Jon Snow returned to give fake news reports about songs of the year, reporting on "Patience" and "America". The children of Mitchell Brook Primary School acted out The Da Vinci Code plagiarism claim and parents rebelling against Jamie Oliver's school dinners campaign. Ian McKellen gave dramatized readings from the autobiographies of Jade Goody and Kerry Katona.

Russell Brand and Noel Fielding spent much of the show giving deliberately wrong – and surreal – answers, leaving them trailing far behind the other two teams. This was until towards the end when Jimmy Carr bowed to the pressure of the studio audience and gave them 22 points for answering one question correctly, which was the amount needed to bring them back into contention at the time and ensuring that they subsequently won the quiz. This led Walliams and Brydon, who came last as a result, to exaggerate their chagrin at the turn of events that had seen Brand and Fielding emerge on top.

During a discussion about the Bob Skeleton event at that year's Winter Olympics, the suggestion arose that a character with that name could be the star of Brand and Fielding's next show together. The pair subsequently became known as the Goth Detectives (opposed to their original name, which arose from a joke Jimmy Carr made about their supposed parentage), which was suggested for the show's title. Though it began as a joke, the pair eventually performed a Goth Detectives sketch for the Teenage Cancer Trust event at the Royal Albert Hall on 28 March 2007.

=== 2007 ===
Name	Team	
The Goth Detectives	Russell Brand	Noel Fielding
The Shadow Cabinet	Rob Brydon	David Mitchell
Fulham	Jonathan Ross	Lily Allen

The 2007 show aired on 30 December 2007. Guest questioners in the studio were Christopher Biggins, Cerys Matthews and John Smeaton, a baggage handler at Glasgow Airport who helped foil a terrorist attack. Pre-recorded questions were asked by Take That, Gordon Ramsay and Thom Yorke. Jon Snow returned with a faux news report on "Umbrella". John Hurt read out extracts from the autobiographies of Peter Andre and 50 Cent. The children of Mitchell Brook Primary School returned to act out David Beckham's move to LA Galaxy and when a judge criticised The Jeremy Kyle Show. Paul Croft, the man who had a tattoo of Dumbledore done on his back before J.K. Rowling announced that Dumbledore was gay, was the mystery guest.

This was the first time that Rob Brydon had been on the winning team, despite having appeared on the panel every year since the first show in 2004. Also, it was the first time (and, as of the 2018 edition, the only time) that the previous year's winning team – the Goth Detectives – had both returned to try to defend their title.

=== 2008 ===
Name	Team	
Dara 'n' Dave	Dara Ó Briain	Davina McCall
Normal & Hooch / Chubb Lock	Sean Lock	James Corden
Michael McIntyre and Claudia Winkleman / Same Difference	Michael McIntyre	Claudia Winkleman

The Big Fat Quiz of the Year 2008 aired on 28 December on Channel 4 at 9:00 pm.

Due to the furore caused by his and Russell Brand's infamous phone call to actor Andrew Sachs, which resulted in his three-month suspension from the BBC at the end of the year, this was the first occasion that Jonathan Ross did not appear. He also declined his customary executive producer credit. Despite Big Fat Quiz not being a BBC programme, Ross himself had thought it inappropriate to do any broadcasting work during the corporation's censure (the same reason that was given for his decision to temporarily concede hosting duties of the British Comedy Awards – broadcast on ITV – around the same time).

This was also the first year that Rob Brydon was absent, leaving host Jimmy Carr as the only regular fixture throughout the Big Fat Quiz of the Year's entire run to date (although neither Brydon nor Ross had been panellists for the special Channel 4 anniversary edition).

In-studio guest questions came from Strictly Come Dancing contestants Jodie Kidd and Mark Foster, and 2008 Olympics Team GB gold medalists Christine Ohuruogu and James DeGale. Pre-recorded guest questions came from Katy Perry, the Fonejacker, Alan Carr, Sarah Silverman and Sir Alan Sugar. Jon Snow gave news reports on "That's Not My Name" and "I Kissed A Girl". John Hurt read from the autobiographies of Les Dennis and Christopher Biggins. The children from Mitchell Brook Primary School also returned acting out the divorce of Paul McCartney and Heather Mills and Jay-Z headlining that year's Glastonbury Festival with Oasis (band) hating it. Sean Lock expressed his hate for Mitchell Brook Primary School's "acting" and James Corden and Jimmy Carr argued over the Sex and the City 2008 movie poster with Corden insistently calling it "Sex and the City: The Movie" when guessing the movie round with Corden and Lock almost walking out of the show in protest over the argument.

=== 2009 ===
Name	Team	
The Moral Minority / Jedward	Jonathan Ross	Russell Brand
The Newlyweds	Rob Brydon	Claudia Winkleman
Ignorance & Want / Dancing Queens	David Mitchell	Charlie Brooker

The 2009 show was recorded on 7 December and aired on 1 January 2010.

Peter Andre appeared in-studio as a guest questioner. Newsreader Jon Snow again appeared with news reports on "Poker Face" and "Bonkers" and the children of Mitchell Brook Primary School also reprised their regular slot, acting out the Parliament expenses scandal and Kanye West invading the stage at the MTV Video Music Awards. Pre-recorded guest questions came from Tim Minchin (asking a question in song about Google Street View), Sir David Attenborough, Stuart Broad, David Tennant and 50 Cent. Swansea cagefighters Daniel Lerwell and James Lilley, who successfully fended off a homophobic attack in a nightclub when they were dressed in drag for a stag night, were the mystery guests.

Ross and Brand made a number of references to the Sachsgate scandal of 2008 which occurred last time they appeared together. There was also a discussion about changing Brooker and Mitchell's team name to The Curmudgeons after they refused to dance to the Lady Gaga song "Poker Face".

Mitchell and Brooker were the eventual winners and were asked by Jimmy Carr after their victory if they wanted to do a dance. Despite pressure from the audience, they kept up their premise of not dancing.

=== 2010 ===
Name	Team	
Posh & Specs / Chatty and Fatty	Michael McIntyre	Alan Carr
Wagner	Jonathan Ross	Ruth Jones
The Electric Moccasins / Robson & Jerome	Richard Ayoade	Noel Fielding

The 2010 show was recorded on 13 December and aired on 3 January 2011.

Guest questions were provided by Nicole Scherzinger, Jack Black, Simon Pegg, Russell Brand, Seth Rogen, the cast of Misfits and Will Ferrell. The children of Mitchell Brook Primary School made their annual appearance acting out news stories, which included The Stig scandal and the Icelandic volcano eruption, as did Jon Snow with his fake news report of Lady Gaga and Beyoncé's "Telephone". Lola, the cat put in a wheelie bin in August by Mary Bale appeared as a mystery guest. Louie Spence posed a question in the form of a dance routine representing the story of the trapped Chilean miners.

Ross and Jones' team name "Wagner" was in reference to Wagner Fiuza-Carillho, known mononymously as Wagner, who had appeared in series 7 of The X Factor that year and had progressed to the quarter final as part of the Over 28s category mentored by Louis Walsh.

=== 2011 ===
Name	Team	
Nexus-6	David Mitchell	Eddie Izzard
Les Be Friends	David Walliams	Miranda Hart
The Lisping Ninnies	Jonathan Ross	Jamie Oliver

The 2011 show was recorded on 14 December and aired on 27 December 2011.

Guest questions were provided by Cee Lo Green, Michael Sheen, Tulisa, Lee Evans, Muppet drummer Animal, Rastamouse, Downton Abbey star Jim Carter, Lenny Kravitz, and Professor Brian Cox. The children of Mitchell Brook Primary School acted out the arrival of Larry the Cat at 10 Downing Street and Cheryl Cole's firing from The X Factor, and Jon Snow gave his news reports on Rebecca Black's "Friday" and Jessie J's "Price Tag". "Supergran" Ann Timson, who was seen in a February 2011 viral video fending off four burglars with just her handbag, appeared as a mystery guest. The Only Way Is Essex cast members Lydia Rose Bright, Lauren Goodger, and Kirk Norcross appeared to present a question about the show.

Hart and Walliams hold the record for first team to not reach double digits and the lowest score of any team in the show's run.

David Mitchell and Eddie Izzard were that year's winners.

=== 2012 ===
Team
Jack Whitehall	James Corden
Russell Howard	Jonathan Ross
Richard Ayoade	Gabby Logan

The 2012 edition aired on 30 December 2012. The teams did not take team names. The in-studio final bonus questions were provided by Team GB and Paralympics GB athletes Nicola Adams, Natasha Baker, Sophie Christiansen, Hannah Cockroft, Helen Glover, Ed McKeever, Etienne Stott, and Peter Wilson. The Great British Bake Off finalists Brendan Lynch, James Morton, and John Whaite provided a live guest question. Recorded guest questions were provided by PSY, Gerard Butler, Usain Bolt, Jessica Ennis, Felix Baumgartner, Kylie Minogue, Cheryl Cole, Simon Callow, Jenson Button, Tom Daley, Warwick Davis, and Charles Dance (doing a dramatic reading from Fifty Shades of Grey). The children of Mitchell Brook Primary School once again made an appearance acting out the Diamond Jubilee Concert. Providing the song lyric as news story segment was Jon Snow, reporting on "Call Me Maybe." During the show, Whitehall and Corden had pizza delivered and ate it with red wine.

The mystery guest was Gary Connery, the stunt-double for the Queen, who skydived out of a helicopter during the 2012 Olympics opening ceremony. The program received 180 complaints to Ofcom, largely over jokes Whitehall and Corden made implying that the Queen had had anal sex with Prince Philip to celebrate their 65th anniversary.

The Daily Mail called the 2012 edition "Channel 4's sick show they call comedy." Though the government declined to formally investigate the program after the complains, Conservative MP Conor Burns called Corden and Whitehall's behavior "obscene" and "unacceptable."

=== 2013 ===
Team
Jack Whitehall	Jonathan Ross
Dara Ó Briain	Kristen Schaal
Richard Ayoade	Noel Fielding

The 2013 edition was recorded on 10 December and aired on 26 December 2013. The teams did not take team names.

Danny Dyer appeared in the studio to provide a live guest question. Pre-recorded guest questions were provided by Russell Brand, Anchorman 2 stars Steve Carell, Will Ferrell, and Paul Rudd; Olly Murs, Christine Ohuruogu, Louis Walsh, Richard Osman, The Great Gonzo (promoting Muppets Most Wanted), Harry Hill, and Sophie Ellis-Bextor, Educating Yorkshire teachers Mr. Mitchell and Mr. Burton, The Great British Bake Off series 4 runner-up Ruby Tandoh, Rizzle Kicks, and astronaut Chris Hadfield. The children of Mitchell Brook Primary School returned to act out Edward Snowden's spy leaks. Jon Snow reported on "Wrecking Ball" and Charles Dance read from the autobiography of Lauren Goodger. The mystery guest was Natalie Holt, who threw eggs at Simon Cowell on the final of Britain's Got Talent.

The show was dedicated to comedy agent and producer Addison Cresswell, who died on 22 December 2013.

Jonathan Ross brought most of a turkey, a loaf of bread and champagne. He ended up making sandwiches for the others.

=== 2014 ===
Name	Team	
The Its / Local Issues	Micky Flanagan	Mel B
Mother & Son	Sarah Millican	Kevin Bridges
Two Nasal Men / David Mitchell's Team / Global Issues	Richard Ayoade	David Mitchell

The 2014 edition was recorded on 1 December and aired on 26 December 2014.

Pre-recorded guest questions came from Michael Palin, Tom Daley, the cast of The Inbetweeners, Game of Thrones actress Natalie Dormer, Lily Allen, Rio Ferdinand, Pixie Lott and Status Quo members Francis Rossi and Rick Parfitt. Paralympic gold medallists Kelly Gallagher and Charlotte Evans provided the in-studio guest question. Charles Dance read from the autobiography of Joey Essex. The children of Mitchell Brook Primary School acted out the Bernie Ecclestone trial. Jon Snow gave his news report about "All About That Bass". The mystery guest was Dean Farley, the jogger who ran into David Cameron.

Mel B's performance received notable negative attention on social media and in the press as having brought down the show by being perceived as sour and humorless.

=== 2015 ===
Team
Rob Brydon	Jo Brand
Richard Ayoade	Greg Davies
Claudia Winkleman	David Mitchell

The 2015 edition was recorded on 14 December 2015 and aired on 26 December 2015. The teams did not take names.

Pre-recorded guest questions came from Quentin Tarantino, Rita Ora, Simon Pegg, Will Ferrell and Mark Wahlberg, Josh Groban, Olly Murs, Katie Price and Heston Blumenthal. The Great British Bake Off winner, Nadiya Hussain, provided the in-studio guest question. The children of Mitchell Brook Primary School acted out Jeremy Clarkson's dismissal from Top Gear. Jon Snow reported on Drake's "Hotline Bling". Charles Dance read from List of the Lost, the debut novel by Morrissey. The mystery guest was Cecilia Bleasdale, who took a photo of a black and blue dress which appeared white and gold to some people on the photo, leading to the dress becoming an internet meme. Davies and Ayoade's early answer "Bad Dong" becomes a running joke throughout the episode.

One of the running gags is the panelists deciding to make an alliance against Jimmy Carr by helping Richard & Greg with getting their answers deliberately wrong. Rob even goes so far as becoming the host of the program for two minutes however the alliance breaks down after a debate about The Dress.

=== 2016 ===
Team
David Mitchell	Sarah Millican
Romesh Ranganathan	Mel Giedroyc
Rob Delaney	Richard Ayoade

The 2016 edition was recorded on 5 December 2016 and aired on 26 December 2016. The teams did not take names.

Pre-recorded guest questions came from Professor Green, Bryan Cranston and James Franco, The Vamps, Sadiq Khan, Ryan Tedder and Zach Filkins from OneRepublic, Miranda Hart, Gemma Chan, Michelle Keegan and Rick Astley. In-studio guest questions were provided by Mark-Francis Vandelli from Made in Chelsea and Pamela Anderson. The children of Mitchell Brook Primary School acted out Traingate. Jon Snow reported on Justin Timberlake's "Can't Stop the Feeling". Charles Dance read from Rylan's autobiography. The mystery guest was Zac Alsop, who posed as a fencer and blagged his way on to one of Team GB's 2016 Olympics victory parade floats in Manchester.

A running gag on the episode was formed when, as Romesh discussed a new programme featuring his mother, Jimmy Carr asked what Romesh's father thought of the programme, not realising that he had died, leading to the other contestants repeatedly chiding Carr about not checking beforehand. There was also a running "gag" with Mel Giedroyc's obsession with the Crossrail project currently going on in and around London.

=== 2017 ===
Name	Team	
The Tinsel Sisters	David Mitchell	Roisin Conaty
Team Pain	Big Narstie	Katherine Ryan
Cakes in the Maze	Richard Ayoade	Noel Fielding

The 2017 edition was recorded at Television Centre on 6 December 2017 and aired on 26 December 2017.

Pre-recorded guest questions came from Kurupt FM, Vince Vaughn, Nadiya Hussain, Clare Balding, Ed Balls and The Script. The in-studio guest question was asked by Great British Bake Off contestant Liam Charles. The children of Mitchell Brook Primary School acted out the silencing of Big Ben during its renovation. Jon Snow reported on Taylor Swift's "Look What You Made Me Do". Charles Dance read from the autobiography of Geordie Shore star Charlotte Crosby. The mystery guest was Liam Smyth, the student whose date got stuck between two windows trying to throw her poo out after it failed to flush. Helping Jimmy Carr with the final question were some real penguins and an animatronic polar bear.

=== 2018 ===
Name	Team	
The Internet is a Mistake	David Mitchell	Michelle Wolf
Gilliwinks	Claudia Winkleman	Mo Gilligan
Discount Fireworks	Noel Fielding	Richard Ayoade

The 2018 edition was recorded at BBC Elstree Studios on 5 December 2018 and aired on 26 December 2018.

Pre-recorded guest questions came from Simon Callow, George Ezra, Alex Jones, Jonas Blue, Joe Sugg, Sheridan Smith, Emma Willis and Georgia Toffolo. In-studio guest questions were asked by Love Island finalists Megan & Wes, Great British Bake Off finalist Kim-Joy Hewlett and Lord Mayor of Sheffield Magid Magid. The children of Mitchell Brook Primary School acted out the England football team's progress in the World Cup for a related question. Jon Snow reported on George Ezra's "Shotgun". Charles Dance read from the new novel by The Only Way Is Essex's Gemma Collins. The mystery guest was Leo Murray, creator of the Trump Baby blimp.

Assisting Jimmy with the final question were the Stan Lee-created Marvel characters Thor, Black Widow, Spider-Man, Black Panther and the Hulk for the teams to guess their aliases. The Hulk then proceeded to rip up the trophy and throw it at the winners before knocking down the wall at the back of the set.

=== 2019 ===
Name	Team	
Mayajamadararama	Dara Ó Briain	Maya Jama
Quiz Hurley & Huge Grant	Roisin Conaty	Asim Chaudhry
Diminishing Returns	Richard Ayoade	Noel Fielding

The 2019 edition was recorded at Elstree Studios on 9 December 2019 and aired on 26 December 2019.

Pre-recorded guest questions came from Luke Evans, Naomi Ackie, Louis Walsh, Luke Goss, Adam Lambert and Dina Asher-Smith. An in-studio guest question was asked by RuPaul's Drag Race UK finalist Baga Chipz and winner The Vivienne. The children of Mitchell Brook Primary School acted out the attempted proroguing of Parliament for a related question. Jon Snow reported on Lizzo's "Juice". Charles Dance read from the biography of Dani Dyer. The mystery guest was Jaden Ashman, the teenager who came second in a Fortnite tournament and won £900,000. The Big Fat Question was asked by Strictly Come Dancing contestant Mike Bushell.

=== 2020 ===
Name	Team	
Undecided	David Mitchell	Maya Jama
Shepherd's Quiz / Cinnamon & Shepherd's Pie	James Acaster	Stacey Solomon
Lycett To Thrill	Joe Lycett	Richard Ayoade

The 2020 edition aired on 26 December 2020.

No celebrity guests appeared in studio to ask questions due to the ongoing COVID-19 pandemic. Pre-recorded questions came from Joe Wicks, Bob Odenkirk, Carole Baskin, Laura Whitmore, Craig David, Keith Lemon, KSI, Chris Kamara, Nicola Coughlan, and LadBaby. The children of Mitchell Brook Primary School acted out the Dominic Cummings scandal for a related question. Jon Snow reported on Jawsh 685 and Jason Derulo's "Savage Love (Laxed – Siren Beat)". Charles Dance read from The Meaning of Mariah Carey. The mystery guest was Billy McLean, whose joke WhatsApp voice memo started a false rumour that the British government was planning to combat hunger during lockdown by making a lasagne the size of Wembley Stadium.

The final question was a round named "Trump or Gump" in which the teams had to guess if quotes were said by US President Donald Trump or another notable figure. London wax museum Madame Tussauds lent its figure of Trump as a prop for the round.

=== 2021 ===
Name	Team	
JJ Bringing Bling	Jonathan Ross	Judi Love
Glow in the Dark Ghosts	Sara Pascoe	James Acaster
The Oblivious Two	Guz Khan	Sarah Millican

The 2021 edition aired on 26 December 2021.

Pre-recorded questions came from Dr. Catherine Green (one of the University of Oxford team responsible for developing the Oxford–AstraZeneca COVID-19 vaccine), Robert Peston, Clara Amfo, Ellie Simmonds, Andi Oliver, Briony May Williams, and Downton Abbey: A New Era's Elizabeth McGovern and Laura Carmichael. The children of Mitchell Brook Primary School acted out the 2021 Suez Canal obstruction. Charles Dance read from the autobiography of Alison Hammond. Jackie Weaver of the viral video of a Handforth Parish Council meeting appeared in the studio to ask a question. The mystery guest was Adam Taylor, the owner of the Aberdeen nightclub where Michael Gove was filmed dancing.

The final question was the normal Big Fat Question, but with a time limit set using the Young-hee doll from Squid Game, with any teams failing to finish writing each answer before the doll's head turns back round being docked five points.

=== 2022 ===
Name	Team	
Something for the Mums	Stephen Merchant	Richard Ayoade
Velvet Surprise	Jonathan Ross	Rose Matafeo
Maple Gravy	Katherine Ryan	Maisie Adam

The 2022 edition aired on 26 December 2022.

Pre-recorded questions came from Krishnan Guru-Murthy, Luke Evans, the Sugababes, Ellie Goulding, Kate Hudson, Layton Williams, Sigrid, and Jamie Oliver. The children of Mitchell Brook Primary School acted out the Wagatha Christie court case for a related question. Millie Bright appeared in the studio to ask a question. Subwoolfer also appeared in the studio in relation to a question. Charles Dance read an extract from the autobiography of Rylan Clark. The mystery guest was Jerry Dyer, the creator and narrator of the YouTube channel Big Jet TV, whose livestream of planes attempting to land at Heathrow Airport during Storm Eunice went viral.

The Big Fat Question was a three part question asked by Johannes Radebe, who was dressed as a US Air Force pilot and 'parachuted' into the studio in honour of Top Gun: Maverick being the year's highest grossing film.

=== 2023 ===
Name	Team	
The Unpronounceables	Richard Ayoade	Mel Giedroyc
Daddy and Me	Katherine Ryan	Rosie Jones
Team GB	Mo Gilligan	Kevin Bridges

The 2023 edition aired on 26 December 2023.

Pre-recorded guest questions came from Self Esteem, Anyone but You stars Sydney Sweeney & Glen Powell, Robbie Williams, The Vivienne, Big Brother presenters AJ Odudu & Will Best, Micah Richards and Sophia Di Martino. The children of Mitchell Brook Primary School acted out the coronation of King Charles for a related question. Charles Dance read an extract from Spare, the memoir of Prince Harry. Krishnan Guru-Murthy appeared in the studio to ask a question. The mystery guests were Hobbycraft Wimbledon employees Andrew, Jacqui, Annie and Sharon, whose TikTok video of Kylie Minogue's hit "Padam Padam" went viral, earning praise from Kylie herself.

The Big Question was asked by noted Love Island and Love Island Games contestants Megan Barton-Hanson and Toby Aromolaran, entering the studio in a pink open top car dressed as Barbie and Ken in tribute to Barbie being the highest grossing film of 2023.

=== 2024 ===
Name	Team	
Moose & Loose	Richard Ayoade	Katherine Ryan
Dirty South	Rob Beckett	Judi Love
Angels of the North	Chris McCausland	Maisie Adam

The 2024 edition aired on 27 December 2024.

Pre-recorded guest questions came from Chiwetel Ejiofor & Leo Woodall, Aidan Turner & Danny Dyer, David Jonsson, Richard Curtis, Nella Rose, Dame Sarah Storey and Love Is Blind contestants Jasmine and Bobby. The children of Mitchell Brook Primary School acted out the Oasis reunion for a related question. Charles Dance read an extract from "Lightning Can Strike Twice", the memoir of Tommy Fury. Peggy the dog and The Traitors contestant Diane Carson both appeared in the studio. The mystery guests were Lisa Rowlands and her friend Lisa, who appeared in a viral video climbing through a window after being locked out of the house.

The final Big Fat Questions were asked by Gladiators Diamond, Electro and Phantom.

=== 2025 ===
Name	Team	
Spit	Roisin Conaty	Katherine Ryan
An Old Man and His Carer	Jonathan Ross	Nick Mohammed
Ayoade Know Her / Chuckle Supper	Richard Ayoade	Lou Sanders

The 2025 edition was recorded at Television Centre on 9 December 2025 and aired on 26 December 2025.

Pre-recorded guest questions were asked by KSI, Jack Black, Jade Thirlwall, Ella Toone, Ellie Goldstein, Cat Burns and Kunal Nayyar. The children of Mitchell Brook Primary School acted out Jeff Bezos' wedding for a related question. The mystery guest was actress Zoë Lister, who provided the voiceover for a much-copied commercial for Jet2holidays. The Celebrity Traitors contestant Joe Marler appeared in the studio to ask a question. Charles Dance read an extract from "Lush", the memoir of Joanna Page.

The final Big Fat Questions were asked by Tia Kofi and Kitty Scott-Claus dressed as Elphaba and Galinda from Wicked.

== The Big Fat Anniversary Quiz ==
No.	Original airdate	Edition	Ratings (millions)
1	2 November 2007	Channel 4's 25th	1.98
2	2 January 2015	TBFQ's 10th	3.19 (Note: 2.81 million on Channel 4 and 384,000 on Channel 4 +1.)

=== The Big Fat Anniversary Quiz (2007) ===
Name	Team	
The CarrDees / CarrJack	Alan Carr	Jack Dee
A&D	Carol Vorderman	Frank Skinner
Team Three / The Speccy Nerdy Fucknuts	Richard Ayoade	David Mitchell

A special edition of the show, celebrating Channel 4's 25th anniversary, was broadcast on 2 November 2007.

Pre recorded questions come from Anna Friel, Jonathan Ross, Quentin Tarantino, Ricky Gervais, Jools Holland, Ram John Holder, Derren Brown, and Jo Frost. The children of Mitchell Brook Primary school acted out classic Channel 4 programmes The Word and TFI Friday. Jon Snow read out a fake news report on The Snowman. An in-studio question came from Vic Reeves. The mystery guest was Joanna Fisher, who was a member of 1980s Channel 4 programme Minipops. Carr and Dee emerged victorious at the climax, and so had to take part in a special challenge which replicated the finale of The Crystal Maze. The pair had to collect silver and gold pieces of paper being blown around in a glass dome.

=== The Big Fat Anniversary Quiz (2015) ===
Name	Team	
The Goth Detectives	Russell Brand	Noel Fielding
	Jonathan Ross	Warwick Davis
	Jack Whitehall	Claudia Winkleman

The second Big Fat Anniversary Quiz was recorded on 29 September 2014 and aired on 2 January 2015, to mark the tenth anniversary of the series.

Pre-recorded guest questions came from Ian McKellen, Paul Hollywood and Mary Berry, Chico, Gregg Wallace, Ellie Simmonds, Peter Andre and Abbey Clancy. Louie Spence provided the in-studio guest question in the form of an interpretive dance about the 2013 horse meat scandal. Charles Dance read from the autobiography of Jay-Z. The children of Mitchell Brook Primary School acted out the launch of the Large Hadron Collider in 2008. Jon Snow gave his news report about "Sex on Fire". The mystery guest was Jon Morter, who started the Facebook campaign to make Rage Against the Machine's "Killing in the Name" the Christmas number 1 in 2009. A Dalek also appeared in the studio to ask the final bonus question, and to "exterminate" Carr at the end of the quiz. Brand and Fielding referenced their previous name as the "Goth Detectives" several times. They got many of their correct answers from an ongoing text conversation with members of the live studio audience. The ruse was discovered when Carr took Brand's phone, called one of the numbers, and an audience member answered. Chico also appeared via text, responding to Jack Whitehall.

== The Big Fat Quiz of Everything ==
The Big Fat Quiz of Everything is a spin-off series to the annual. These quizzes ask questions based on various subjects including history, geography, films, television, music, science, technology, art, literature, sports and games.

No.	Original airdate	Ratings (millions)
1	5 January 2016	2.47 (Note: 2.17 million on Channel 4 and 303,000 on Channel 4 +1.)
2	15 August 2016	1.40
3	22 August 2016	1.44
4	28 August 2016	1.46
5	6 January 2017	2.08
6	12 January 2018	1.94
7	4 January 2019	2.44
8	7 January 2021	2.24
9	3 April 2022	1.22
10	2 January 2025	unknown

=== 2016 special ===
Name	Team	
Cops and Wobbers	Jonathan Ross	Chelsea Peretti
The Custard Junkies	Jack Whitehall	Mel Giedroyc
The Ladder Collars / Team Falafel / Russell Brand Not Available	Noel Fielding	Richard Ayoade

The first special was recorded in October 2015 and aired on 5 January 2016.

Pre-recorded guest questions came from Little Mix, Gareth Malone, Paul Whitehouse, Joey Essex, Jessica Ennis-Hill, Dom and Steph Parker from Gogglebox, Kevin McCloud, Darcey Bussell and Alesha Dixon. Chris Kamara provided the in-studio guest question. The children of Mitchell Brook Primary School acted out The Great Fire of London. Jon Snow reported on Queen's "Bohemian Rhapsody".

=== 2016 series ===
A three-part series of The Big Fat Quiz of Everything was recorded in June and July 2016 at The London Studios.

==== Episode 1 ====
Name	Team	
David & Claudia	Claudia Winkleman	David Mitchell
The Awesome Clams	Mel Giedroyc	Kristen Schaal
One and a Half Condoms	Jonathan Ross	Bob Mortimer

The first episode aired on 15 August 2016.

Pre-recorded guest questions came from Buzz Aldrin, Deborah Meaden from Dragons' Den, Joey Essex, Rylan Clark, Warwick Davis and David Haye. The in-studio guest questions were asked by First Dates maitre d' Fred Sirieix (who proceeded to open a large bottle of champagne and serve it to the contestants and the studio audience) and Strictly Come Dancing pair Kevin and Karen Clifton, who performed a series of dances in a minute for the contestants to guess. The children of Mitchell Brook Primary School acted out the Watergate scandal. Jon Snow reported on the Village People's "YMCA".

==== Episode 2 ====
Name	Team	
The Sultans of Bhunai	Noel Fielding	Richard Ayoade
Two Great Guys Trying Their Best / The Ancient Fucks	Adam Buxton	Jonathan Ross
Tits and Teeth	Aisling Bea	Rob Beckett

The second episode aired on 22 August 2016.

Pre-recorded guest questions came from Jodie Kidd, Dr. Christian Jessen, Joey Essex, Ronan Keating, Jerry Springer and Eddie "The Eagle" Edwards. The children of Mitchell Brook Primary School acted out the Wars of the Roses. Jon Snow reported on The B-52's "Love Shack". The Mariachis appeared to play TV themes in a mariachi style for the final question.

==== Episode 3 ====
Name	Team	
The Twins	Alan Carr	Romesh Ranganathan
Darsea O Perettiain	Dara Ó Briain	Chelsea Peretti
The Phrologists	Noel Fielding	Eddie Izzard

The third episode aired on 28 August 2016.

Pre-recorded guest questions came from Jess Glynne, Made in Chelsea's Jamie Laing, Ricky Wilson, Ray Mears and Joey Essex. The children of Mitchell Brook Primary School acted out Henry VIII's dissolution of the monasteries. Jon Snow reported on Sir Mix-a-Lot's "Baby Got Back". Two sloths appeared in the studio for a question about the seven deadly sins, and three male nude models replicated famous historical statues for the final question.

=== 2017 special ===
Name	Team	
Walliams	Jonathan Ross	David Walliams
Foreign Twerkers	Katherine Ryan	Aisling Bea
Humanity's Last Hope	Noel Fielding	Richard Ayoade

The second New Year special was recorded in October 2016 and aired on Friday 6 January 2017.

Pre-recorded guest questions came from Joe Wicks, Nick Hewer, Joey Essex, Laura and Jason Kenny, Derren Brown, Ollie Locke from Made in Chelsea and Darcey Bussell. Jonnie Peacock provided the in-studio guest question in the form of sporting celebrations. The children of Mitchell Brook Primary School acted out the Napster lawsuits. David Walliams and Jonathan Ross made a humorous disagreement over RikRok's name when guessing the locations in the Shaggy song "It Wasn't Me. Jon Snow reported on The Weather Girls' "It's Raining Men". Charles Dance read confusing movie reviews from Amazon customers. The London Philharmonic Choir appeared to sing popular hip-hop and rap tunes in a choral style for the final question.

=== 2018 special ===
Name	Team	
The British Asians	Jonathan Ross	Nish Kumar
Ladies Who Lunch, Breakfast, Dinner, Snack and Tea	Claudia Winkleman	Miranda Hart
Strike Force One	Vic Reeves	Bob Mortimer

The third New Year special was recorded on 11 December 2017 at Television Centre and aired on Friday 12 January 2018.

Pre-recorded guest questions came from Luke Evans, Ore Oduba, Dynamo, Christian Slater, Judy Murray and Reverend Kate Bottley. The children of Mitchell Brook Primary School acted out Garry Kasparov's defeat to Deep Blue. Jon Snow reported on Billy Ray Cyrus' "Achy Breaky Heart". Charles Dance read confusing online film reviews. The mystery guests were John Cornelius, Robbie Humphries and Anthony Eden, who all played The Milkybar Kid as children. The Big Fat Question featured several football team mascots for the teams to identify.

=== 2019 special ===
Team
Sandi Toksvig	Joe Lycett
Katherine Ryan	Big Narstie
David Baddiel	Frank Skinner

The fourth New Year special was recorded at BBC Elstree Studios on 21 November 2018 and aired on 4 January 2019. The teams did not take team names.

Pre-recorded guest questions came from Brendan O'Carroll, Stacey Solomon, Eric Idle, Asim Chaudhry (in character as Chabuddy G from People Just Do Nothing), Basil Brush, Clara Amfo and Boyzone. The in-studio guest questions were provided by This Morning's Dr. Ranj who asked the teams to identify different muscles and bones in the body, and First Dates barman Merlin Griffiths who asked the teams to identify the cocktails he was mixing. The children of Mitchell Brook Primary School acted out the construction of the Channel Tunnel. Charles Dance read terrible online film reviews. Jon Snow reported on "Milkshake" by Kelis. The mystery guests were Alex and Sue Tatham, the first Blind Date wedding couple. Doppelgangers of Tom Hanks, Will Smith, Robert Downey Jr., Emma Watson, Dwayne Johnson and Julia Roberts appeared for the Big Fat Question for the teams to put in order of highest-grossing film stars.

=== 2021 special ===
Name	Team	
Tits and Teeth	Rob Beckett	Roisin Conaty
All Killer Some Filler	Nish Kumar	Katherine Ryan
Robot	Rob Brydon	Oti Mabuse

The fifth special aired on 7 January 2021.

Pre-recorded questions came from Paloma Faith, Billy Ocean, Ralph Macchio, Maggie Aderin-Pocock, Clare Balding, Tim Minchin, and Roman Kemp. The children of Mitchell Brook Primary School acted out the theft and recovery of the 1966 World Cup for a related question. Jon Snow reported on Radiohead's "Creep". Charles Dance reads book reviews from Jane Eyre, Twilight, and Moby Dick. The special guest was Barbadian British voice-over actor Redd Pepper, who offered to read Taglines from four famous movies. The mystery guest was Jessica Smith, the Sun Baby in Teletubbies. The final question was a round in which The London Street Band played 4 different longest number one tracks from 70s-00s, and the teams had to guess the songs in their respective decades.

=== 2022 special ===
Name	Team	
C&A	Richard Ayoade	Roisin Conaty
The Serious Television Intelligence Squad (STIs)	Joanne McNally	Rob Beckett
PC Gone Mad	Rosie Jones	Mawaan Rizwan

The sixth special aired on 3 April 2022.

Pre-recorded questions came from Katie Piper, Daniel Mays, Gemma Whelan, Annie Mac, Kye Whyte, Paul Hollywood and Hannah Cockroft. The children of Mitchell Brook Primary School acted out the Cottingley Fairy hoax. Charles Dance read bad online reviews of The Lord of the Rings, Fifty Shades of Grey and Animal Farm. Clarkson's Farm star Kaleb Cooper appeared in the studio to ask a question about animals. The mystery guests were Ben Cooke, Mark Higgins and Bobby Hanton, who were all stunt doubles for Daniel Craig in various James Bond films. The Big Fat Question involved lookalikes of Elton John, Diana Ross, Ed Sheeran, Stormzy and Lady Gaga, with the teams having to place them in order of most weeks spent at number one in the UK Singles Chart.

=== 2025 special ===
Name	Team	
Farrygill	Harry Hill	Fatiha El-Ghorri
Lamb Roisin Josh	Josh Pugh	Roisin Conaty
David's Not Normal	Sophie Willan	David Mitchell

The seventh special aired on 2 January 2025.

Pre-recorded questions came from J. Smith-Cameron, Linford Christie, Chelsea Lazkani, David Tennant, Hugh Bonneville, GK Barry and Garth Marenghi. The children of Mitchell Brook Primary School acted out a scene from The Lord of the Rings. Charles Dance recited iconic lines from reality TV shows Love Island and RuPaul's Drag Race UK. The special guests were 3 dogs, Sammy, Freddy and Izzy who were modeling a famous outfit from an iconic TV show or film and the teams had to name the three shows. The mystery guests were Lily Snowden-Fine and Cecily Bloom, who were the voice over artists on Peppa Pig.

The final question was a horror themed round in which the teams had to guess which out of these iconic villains: Xenomorph, Samara, Pennywise and Freddy Krueger have all killed their fair share of victims on-screen. However, the teams had to guess who's killed the most.

== The Big Fat Quiz of the Decade ==
In 2012, three Big Fat Quizzes were recorded as part of Channel 4's 30th anniversary celebrations, each representing one of the past decades. The shows were recorded on 30 August, 12 September and 19 September.

No.	Original airdate	Edition	Ratings (millions)
1	16 September 2012	1980s	2.27 (Note: 1.92 million on Channel 4 and 347,000 on Channel 4 +1.)
2	23 September 2012	1990s	2.14 (Note: 1.77 million on Channel 4 and 365,000 on Channel 4 +1.)
3	30 September 2012	2000s	2.04 (Note: 1.71 million on Channel 4 and 327,000 on Channel 4 +1.)
4	22 September 2013	1980s	1.88
5	29 September 2013	1990s	1.84
6	2 January 2020	2010s	2.86

=== The Big Fat Quiz of the '80s ===
Team
Jason Manford	Stephen Mangan
Jonathan Ross	Adam Buxton
Micky Flanagan	Carol Vorderman

The show was recorded on 12 September 2012 and aired on 16 September 2012. The teams did not take team names for this special.

In-studio guest questions were provided by Kriss Akabusi and Samantha Fox, who presented the final bonus question. Recorded guest questions were provided by Su Pollard, Michael Fish, Clare Grogan, Roland Rat, Nik Kershaw, The Proclaimers, Anne Charleston, Charles Dance (doing a dramatic reading from the autobiography of The Krankies), and Sonia. The children of Mitchell Brook Primary School made an appearance acting out Live Aid. Providing the song lyric as news story segment was original Newsround anchor John Craven, reporting on "Thriller". Bunty Bailey, the actress who played the female love interest in a-ha's "Take On Me", appeared as a mystery guest. The four winners were "presented" a Sinclair C5 by Samantha Fox.

=== The Big Fat Quiz of the '90s ===
Team
Phill Jupitus	Alan Davies
Dara Ó Briain	Claudia Winkleman
Jack Whitehall	Denise van Outen

The show was recorded on 19 September 2012 and aired on 23 September 2012. The teams did not take team names for this special.

The in-studio final bonus questions were provided (after a fashion) by Mr Blobby. Recorded guest questions were provided by Zig and Zag, Chesney Hawkes, B*Witched members Lindsay Armaou and Keavy Lynch, Laurence Llewelyn-Bowen, Vic and Bob (Vic Reeves and Bob Mortimer), Linford Christie, and Charles Dance (doing a dramatic reading from the autobiography of Melanie Brown). The children of Mitchell Brook Primary School made an appearance acting out the launch and repair of the Hubble Space Telescope. Providing the song lyric as news story segment was former BBC Nine O'Clock News presenter Michael Buerk, reporting on "I'm Too Sexy". John Simmit and Nikky Smedley, the portrayers of Teletubbies Dipsy and Laa-Laa (respectively), appeared as mystery guests.

=== The Big Fat Quiz of the '00s ===
Name	Team	
Big Gay Al and His Big Scottish Pal	Kevin Bridges	Alan Carr
Team Three	Sarah Millican	David Mitchell
The Indoor Kites / Hot Shame	Richard Ayoade	Noel Fielding

The show was recorded on 30 August 2012 and aired on 30 September 2012.

The in-studio final bonus questions were provided by the Cheeky Girls. Dragons' Den dragon Duncan Bannatyne provided a live guest question. Recorded guest questions were provided by Gregg Wallace, Nick Bateman, Peter Andre, half of McFly, Gareth Gates, Tara Palmer-Tomkinson, and Charles Dance (doing a dramatic reading from the autobiography of Katie Price). The children of Mitchell Brook Primary School made an appearance acting out the cheating scandal on Who Wants to Be a Millionaire?. Providing the song lyric as news story segment was Channel 4 News presenter and Big Fat Quiz regular Jon Snow, reporting on "It Wasn't Me". Howard Davies-Carr and his two sons Harry and Charlie, stars of the popular viral video Charlie Bit My Finger appeared as mystery guests. Big Brother voiceover announcer Marcus Bentley read the final scores.

=== 2013 specials ===
Due to the success of the decades specials in 2012, Channel 4 commissioned two additional specials to air in the autumn of 2013.

==== The Big Fat Quiz of the '80s (2013) ====
Team
David Mitchell	Phill Jupitus
Alan Carr	Sarah Greene
Jack Dee	Jason Donovan

The show aired on 22 September 2013. The teams did not take team names for this special.

Anneka Rice provided a live guest question. The mystery guest was Stelios Havatzios, the 1980s Athena Baby in the L'Enfant poster. Recorded guest questions were provided by Toyah Willcox, Kim Wilde, Jim Bowen, Bob Carolgees, Carol Decker, Trevor and Simon (Going Live!), Tony Robinson, Gordon Burns and Charles Dance (doing a dramatic reading from the autobiography of Chas & Dave's Chas). The children of Goldsmith Community Hall made an appearance acting out Operation Deepscan. Providing the song lyric as news story segment was John Craven, reporting on "Total Eclipse of the Heart".

==== The Big Fat Quiz of the '90s (2013) ====
Team
Jonathan Ross	Jo Brand
Sue Perkins	Lee Mack
Bob Mortimer	Richard Ayoade

The show aired on 29 September 2013. The teams did not take team names for this special.

Diane Youdale (the one-time Gladiator Jet) provided a live guest question. The mystery guest was Todd Watkins, who gained fame for kissing a 77-year-old woman on a The Word segment called "The Hopefuls". Recorded guest questions were provided by Mr. Motivator, Goldie, Andi Peters, Tony Mortimer, Melinda Messenger, Daniela Nardini, Sally Gunnell, The Shamen's Mr. C, the members of Hanson and Charles Dance (doing a dramatic reading from the autobiography of Vanilla Ice). The children of Goldsmith Community Hall made an appearance acting out the cloning of Dolly the sheep played by Hannah MacDonald. Providing the song lyric as news story segment was Martyn Lewis, reporting on "Livin' la Vida Loca". In the penultimate round, Carr announced that he had hired the gunge tank from Noel's House Party and the losers would be gunged, however Ross convinced Carr himself to go in it and was gunged by Jet.

=== The Big Fat Quiz of the Decade (2020) ===
Team name	Team	
The Beliebers	Jonathan Ross	Stacey Solomon
Dexit Means Dexit	Claudia Winkleman	Nish Kumar
Lads, Lads, Lads / Grinders & Mincers	Alan Carr	Joe Lycett

The show aired on 2 January 2020.

Jimmy was joined by Pikachu for a live question themed on Pokémon. The mystery guests were two actors and a dog who had appeared in various John Lewis Christmas adverts during the decade. Recorded guest questions were provided by Jourdan Dunn, Scarlett Moffatt, Bear Grylls, Sophia the Robot, Peter Crouch, Oti Mabuse and McFly. Jon Snow provided the song lyric as news story segment, reporting on "Get Lucky". Charles Dance gave readings of online reviews of films. The children of Mitchell Brook Primary School made an appearance acting out the rescue of the Chilean miners. The final question was asked by Charlotte Crosby, dressed as Miley Cyrus in the Wrecking Ball video.

== The Big Fat Quiz of Sport ==
Name	Team	
Sports and Prayers	Roisin Conaty	Dane Baptiste
Double P.E.	Tom Allen	Kerry Godliman
Richard & Judi	Judi Love	Joel Dommett

The show was recorded on 28 November 2022 and aired on 14 May 2023.

Recorded guest questions were provided by Stephen Fry, Joe Marler, Kelly Holmes, Tim Peake, Kadeena Cox and David Haye. Will Joseph, Alex Cuthbert, and Dillon Lewis appeared in-studio wearing iconic outfits of sportspersons that the teams needed to identify. The children of Mitchell Brook Primary School made an appearance acting out the infamous "hair-dryer treatment" done by Manchester United manager Alex Ferguson to David Beckham after losing to Arsenal at the 2002-03 FA Cup's fifth round. Charles Dance read an extract from the autobiography of Andre Agassi. Fiona Walker, the tennis girl from the 1980's Athena poster, appeared as a mystery guest. Shaun Wallace, one of the chasers from The Chase, made an appearance as Joel's temporary substitute after he suffered a hand cramp.

The Big Fat Question was a three part question performed in the style of rap by John Barnes about sportspersons who had involved in sporting scandals.

== The Big Fat Quiz of Telly ==
=== 2024 special ===
Name	Team	
BabagoRuss	Russell Howard	Babatunde Aleshe
Channel Four	Jamie Demetriou	Natasia Demetriou
Dyslexic ladies of the night	Judi Love	Daisy May Cooper

The show was recorded on 20 November 2023 and aired on 23 August 2024.

Recorded guest questions come from Nadiya Hussain, Allison Hammond and Dermont O’Leary, Natalie Cassidy, Richard Cadell (with Sooty, Sweep, and Soo), Mr. Blobby, The Vivienne, Stephen Fry, and Ainsley Harriott. The children of Mitchell Brook Primary School appear, but instead of acting out a television scene or moment, they discuss about Mr. Bean, Only Fools and Horses, and Gladiators. The mystery guests were Jon Briggs, Marcus Bentley, and India Fisher, who each do voiceovers for the original version of The Weakest Link (Briggs), Big Brother (Bentley), and MasterChef (Fisher) (respectively). Charles Dance re-enact quotes from Come Dine with Me, Love Island, and Celebrity Big Brother. Honey G, The Cheeky Girls, and Chico Slimani appear in a Masked Singer-style bonus round, respectively wearing masks of the yellow Power Ranger, the Squid Game soldiers, and a Cyberman from Doctor Who.

The Big Fat Question was in the style of Catchphrase, with questions about famous television catchphrases accompanied by animated clips of Jimmy Carr with the show’s mascot Mr. Chips.

=== 2026 special ===
Name	Team	
Hair Balding	Harry Hill	Tom Allen
JamIrish Labias	Judi Love	Joanne McNally
Susan and Sam	Susan Wokoma	Sam Campbell

The show aired on 9 January 2026.

Recorded guest questions come from Jack Whitehall, Shaun Wallace and Jenny Ryan, Naga Munchetty, Nitro, Mark Hamill, Ruth Codd, and Ade Adepitan. The children of Mitchell Brook Primary School acted out Gillian McKeith's appearance on I'm a Celebrity...Get Me Out of Here! for a related question. Levi Roots appeared in the studio to ask a question. Charles Dance read an extract from the memoirs of Danny Dyer. The mystery guest was Adrianna Christofi, who had appeared as "The Body" in The Cube.

The Big Fat Question featured Mr Blobby singing themes from TV shows which the contestants had to identify.
