= Labour Party leadership of Jeremy Corbyn =

Jeremy Corbyn's tenure as Leader of the Labour Party

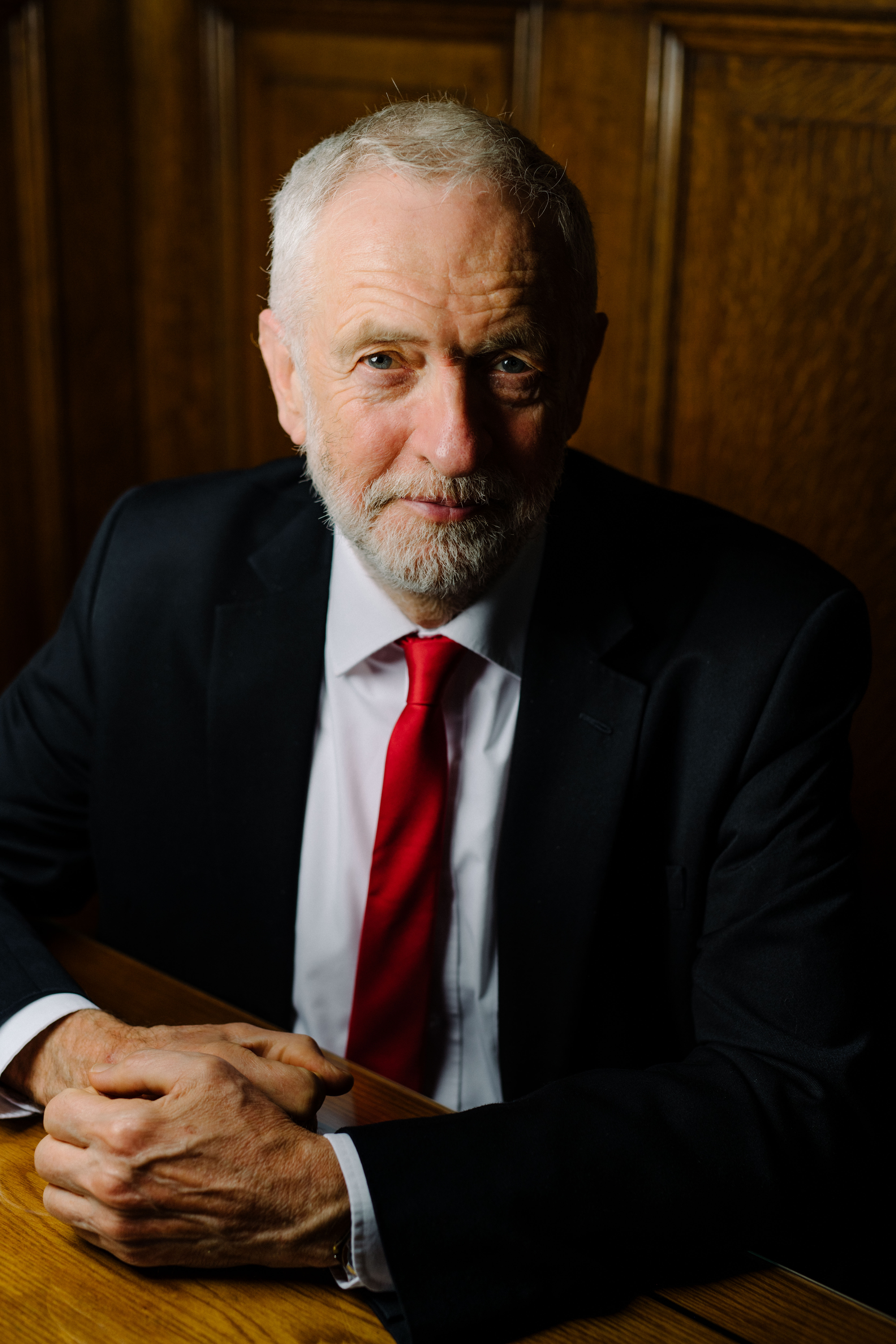
- Official portrait, 2019
- Labour Party leadership of Jeremy Corbyn; 12 September 2015 – 4 April 2020
- Monarch: Elizabeth II
- Cabinet: Corbyn shadow cabinet
- Party: Labour
- Election: Leadership: 2015; 2016; General: 2017; 2019

Jeremy Corbyn was elected as Leader of the Opposition in September 2015, following the resignation of Ed Miliband after Labour's defeat at the 2015 general election. Disillusioned by a lack of a left-wing voice in the 2015 Labour Party leadership contest, Corbyn stood on an anti-austerity platform. Of the candidates who stood, Corbyn received the fewest parliamentary nominations. Many who nominated him said they had done so not to support his candidacy, but to widen the debate by including a socialist voice. However, Corbyn soon became the frontrunner and was elected with a landslide of 59%.

Corbyn appointed John McDonnell as Shadow Chancellor and promoted several female backbenchers, forming a Shadow Cabinet that for the first time had more women than men. Under Corbyn's leadership, Labour shifted to the left from the centre-ground. In November 2015, he voted against British military involvement in the Syrian civil war. He also opposed the renewal of the Trident nuclear weapons system and apologised for the Tony Blair ministry taking the UK into the Iraq War. In spite of his victory, Corbyn enjoyed little support from Labour MPs, although his support remained strong amongst Labour Party members. In 2016, Labour were widely criticised in the media for their apparent poor performance in local elections; despite this, they had won 34.1% of the PCC vote against the Conservatives' 30%, they lost 18 councillors to the Conservatives' loss of 48, Labour government control was retained in Wales, and Labour achieved a clean sweep of the mayoralties of London, Bristol, Liverpool, and Salford. Following the European Union membership referendum, in which Britain voted to leave the European Union, party opponents accused Corbyn of running a lukewarm campaign for the Britain Stronger in Europe campaign; one major opponent, Angela Eagle, cited his lack of devotion to the Remain cause while simultaneously observing the energetic and itinerant means by which his campaign was conducted. Several resigned from the Shadow Cabinet and Corbyn lost a motion of no confidence by 197–40. Eagle and Owen Smith launched a formal challenge, although Eagle later withdrew and endorsed Smith. Corbyn was re-elected with a marginally higher majority of 61%, the largest leadership election majority of any Labour leader in history.

Although Labour suffered poor results at the local elections in May 2017, at the snap 2017 general election the party secured 40% of the vote with the biggest increase in Labour vote share for 72 years, and forced the Conservatives to form a minority government with Corbyn remaining Labour leader. In the 2018 local elections, Labour increased its share of the vote. In the 2019 local elections, Labour's seat total dropped by 84. In the 2019 European Parliament election, Labour came third behind the Brexit Party and the Liberal Democrats. In the 2019 general election, Labour's vote share dropped to 32%, winning the lowest number of seats since 1935. The result led to Corbyn's announcement that he would stand down as Labour leader. Some reasons for the defeat included concerns about Corbyn's leadership, the party's "ambiguous" position on Brexit, and concerns that the commitments in the left-wing manifesto were "undeliverable".

Corbyn remained Labour leader for four months while the leadership election to replace him took place. His resignation as Labour leader formally took effect in April 2020 following the election of Keir Starmer. During his tenure as leader, Corbyn came under criticism in relation to antisemitism within the Labour Party. Corbyn has condemned antisemitism and apologised for its presence within the party, while his leadership oversaw changes to strengthen party disciplinary procedures regarding hate speech and racism as recommended by the 2016 Chakrabarti Inquiry. An internal 2020 report and the subsequent 2022 Forde Report noted that Corbyn's team inherited a dysfunctional disciplinary system which eventually improved under General Secretary Jennie Formby, and stated that antisemitism was used as a factional weapon by both opponents and supporters of Corbyn within the party. A 2020 Equality and Human Rights Commission inquiry into the matter found the party under his leadership was responsible for unlawful acts of discrimination and harassment.

== First term as Leader of the Opposition (2015–2017) ==
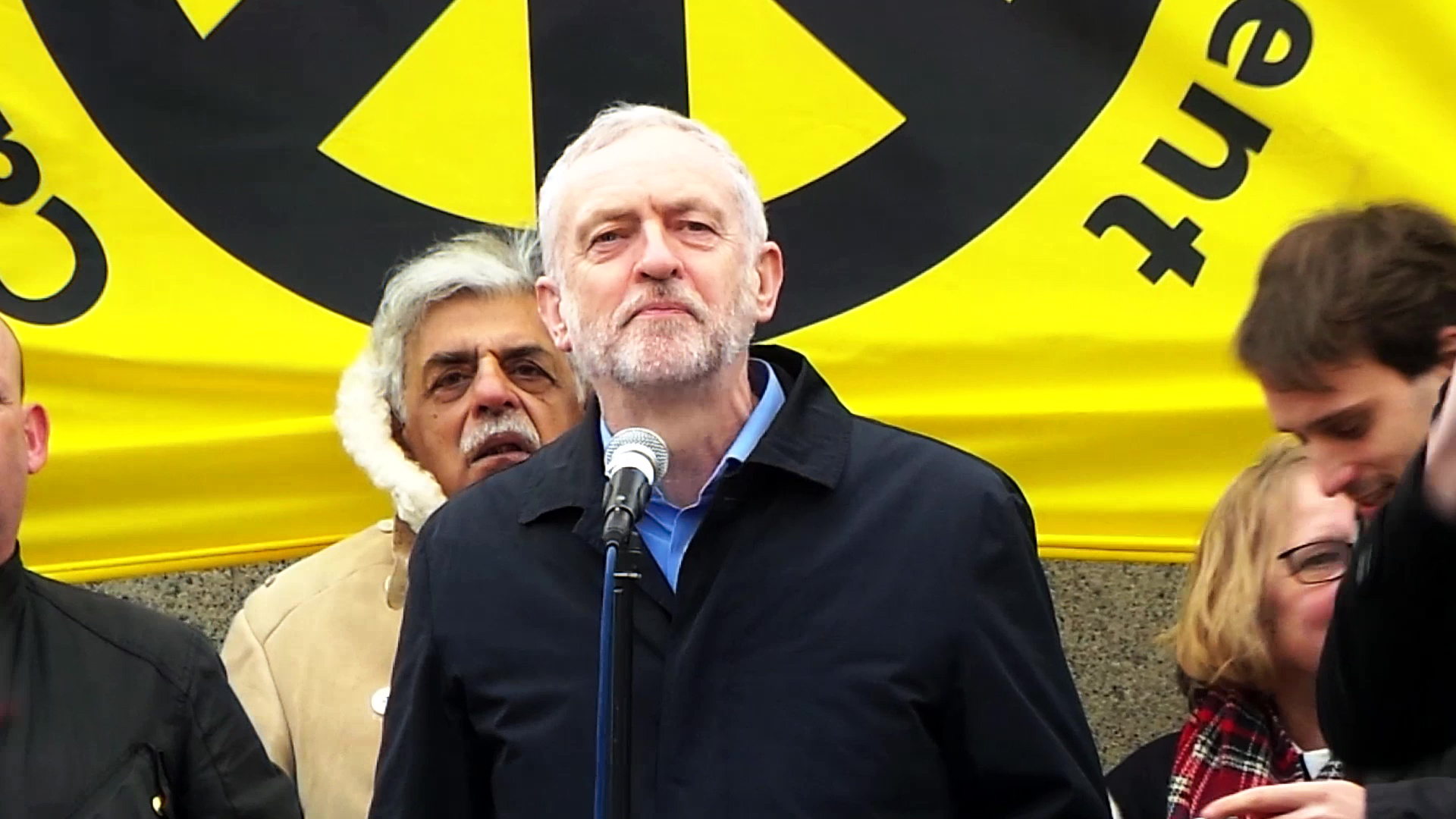
Corbyn speaking at the #StopTrident rally at Trafalgar Square on 27 February 2016

After being elected leader, Corbyn became Leader of the Official Opposition and shortly thereafter his appointment to the Privy Council was announced. In Corbyn's first Prime Minister's Questions session as leader, he broke with the traditional format by asking the Prime Minister six questions he had received from members of the public, the result of his invitation to Labour Party members to send suggestions, for which he received around 40,000 emails. Corbyn stressed his desire to reduce the "theatrical" nature of the House of Commons, and his début was described in a Guardian editorial as "a good start" and a "long overdue" change to the tone of PMQs. He delivered his first Labour Party Conference address as leader on 29 September 2015. Party membership nearly doubled between the May 2015 election and October 2015, attributed largely to the election as leader of Corbyn.

In September 2015 an unnamed senior serving general in the British Army stated that a mutiny by the Army could occur if a future Corbyn government moved to scrap Trident, pull out of Nato or reduce the size of the armed forces. The general said "the Army just wouldn't stand for it. The general staff would not allow a prime minister to jeopardise the security of this country and I think people would use whatever means possible, fair or foul to prevent that. You can't put a maverick in charge of a country's security".

In July 2016, a study and analysis by academics from the London School of Economics of months of eight national newspaper articles about Corbyn in the first months of his leadership of Labour showed that 75% of them either distorted or failed to represent his actual views on subjects.

=== First Shadow Cabinet and other appointments ===
On 13 September 2015, Corbyn unveiled his Shadow Cabinet. He appointed his leadership campaign manager and long-standing political ally John McDonnell as Shadow Chancellor, leadership opponent Andy Burnham as Shadow Home Secretary, and Angela Eagle as Shadow First Secretary of State to deputise for him in the House of Commons. Corbyn promoted a number of female backbench MPs to Shadow Cabinet roles, including Diane Abbott, Heidi Alexander and Lisa Nandy, making his the first Shadow Cabinet with more women than men, although the most senior roles went to men. In October 2015, Corbyn appointed The Guardian journalist Seumas Milne as the Labour Party's Executive Director of Strategy and Communications.

=== Military intervention in Syria ===
After members of Islamic State carried out terrorist attacks in Paris in November 2015, Corbyn agreed with David Cameron that a political settlement between the Syrian Government and the rebels should be aimed at resolving the Syrian civil war. Prime Minister David Cameron sought to build political consensus for UK military intervention against IS targets in Syria in the days after the attacks. Corbyn warned against "external intervention" in Syria but told delegates that Labour would "consider the proposals the Government brings forward".

After Cameron set out his case for military intervention to Parliament, Corbyn held a Shadow Cabinet meeting, in which he said he would continue with efforts "to reach a common view" on Syria, while Shadow Foreign Secretary Hilary Benn suggested the case for air strikes was "compelling". Corbyn sent a letter to Labour MPs saying that he could not support military action against Islamic State: "The issue [is] whether what the Prime Minister is proposing strengthens, or undermines, our national security...I do not believe the current proposal for air strikes in Syria will protect our security and therefore cannot support it." Amid widespread reports of division in the Parliamentary Labour Party, Corbyn insisted that the final decision on whether the Labour Party would oppose air strikes rested with him. Corbyn eventually agreed that Labour MPs would be given a free vote on air strikes when the issue was voted on. 66 Labour MPs voted for the Syrian air strikes, including Hilary Benn and Deputy Labour Leader Tom Watson, while Corbyn and the majority of Labour MPs voted against.

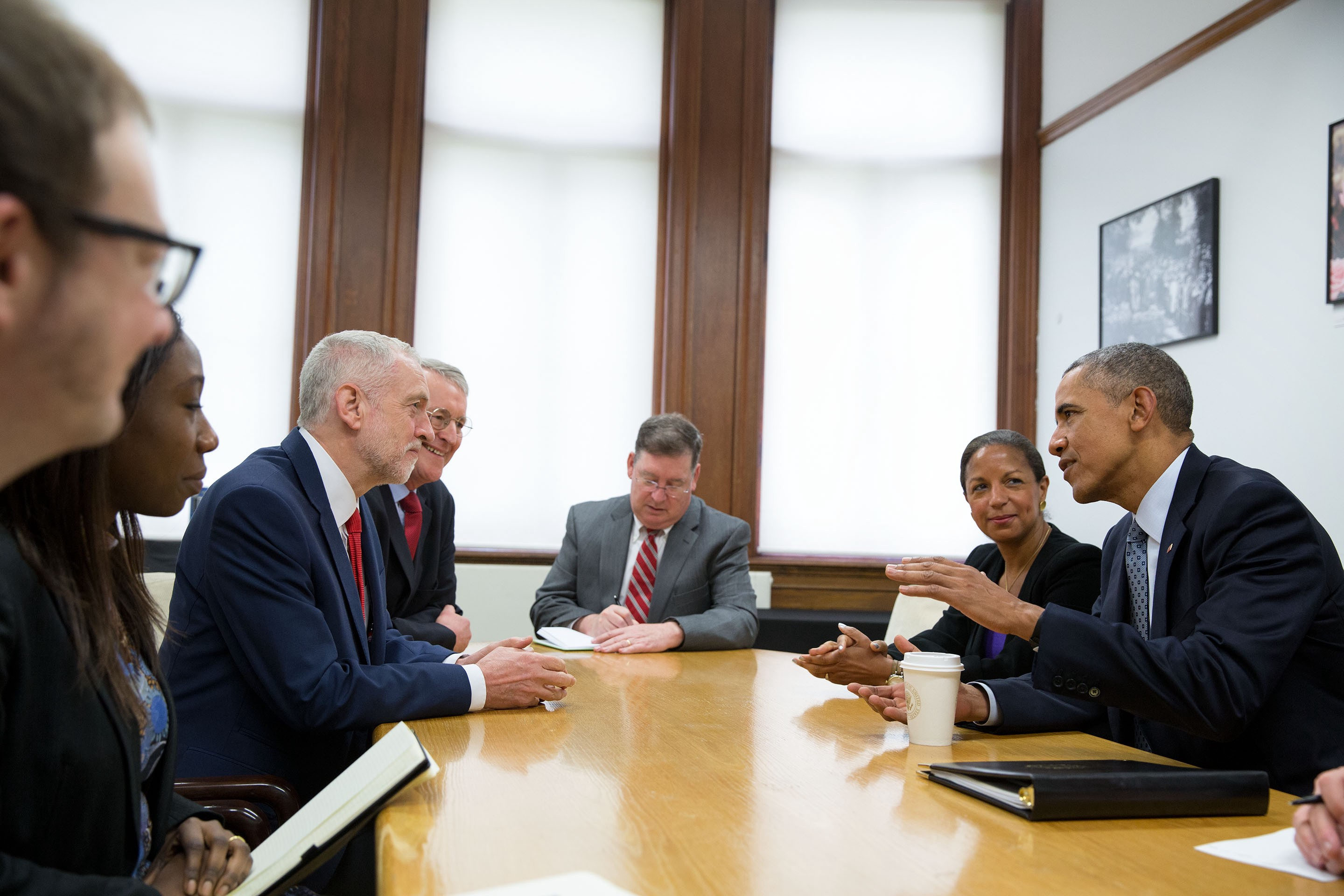
Corbyn and Hilary Benn meet with President Obama in April 2016

=== January 2016 Shadow Cabinet reshuffle ===
There was widespread speculation following the vote that Corbyn would reshuffle his Shadow Cabinet to remove Hilary Benn, but Corbyn's January reshuffle retained Benn in the same position. The reshuffle prompted the resignations of three junior shadow ministers who were unhappy that Corbyn had sacked or moved shadow ministers who disagreed with his position on Syria and Trident.

On 6 January 2016, Corbyn replaced Shadow Culture Secretary Michael Dugher with Shadow Defence Secretary Maria Eagle (who was in turn replaced by Shadow Employment Minister Emily Thornberry). Thornberry, unlike Maria Eagle, is an opponent of nuclear weapons and British involvement in Syria. Corbyn also replaced Shadow Europe Minister (not attending Shadow Cabinet) Pat McFadden with Pat Glass. On 11 January 2016, Shadow Attorney General Catherine McKinnell resigned, citing party infighting, family reasons and the ability to speak in Parliament beyond her legal portfolio. She was replaced by Karl Turner.

=== May 2016 local elections ===
In the 2016 local elections, Labour had a net loss of 18 local council seats and controlled as many councils as before (gaining control of Bristol but losing Dudley). There were also Westminster by-elections in two Labour safe seats, which Labour retained: Ogmore and Sheffield Brightside and Hillsborough. The BBC's Projected National Vote Share was 31% for Labour, 30% for the Conservatives, 15% for the Liberal Democrats and 12% for UKIP. Labour candidate Sadiq Khan won the London mayorship from the Conservatives. Labour's misfortunes in Scotland continued, where they fell into third place behind the Conservatives. They retained government in Wales whilst suffering some small losses.

=== EU referendum ===
Following the 2016 United Kingdom European Union (EU) membership referendum, Corbyn was accused of "lukewarm" campaigning for Britain to remain and showing a "lack of leadership" on the issue by several party figures. Alan Johnson, who headed the Labour In for Britain campaign, said that "at times" it felt as if Corbyn's office was "working against the rest of the party and had conflicting objectives". Corbyn's decision to go on holiday during the campaign was also criticised by Phil Wilson, the chair of Labour In for Britain. In September 2016, Corbyn's spokesman said Corbyn wanted access to the European single market, but there were "aspects" of EU membership related to privatisation "which Jeremy campaigned against in the referendum campaign". Diane Abbott, one of Corbyn's key allies, later said "Jeremy in his heart of hearts is a Brexiter". She said Corbyn was hostile to the European Union, which he considered "a conspiracy of business people".

=== Shadow Cabinet resignations and vote of no confidence ===
Corbyn at the 2016 Tolpuddle Martyrs' Festival

Three days after the EU referendum, on 26 June, Hilary Benn was sacked after it was disclosed that he had been organising a mass resignation of Shadow Cabinet members to force Corbyn to stand down. Several other Shadow Cabinet members resigned in solidarity with Benn and by the following day, 23 of the 31 Shadow Cabinet members had resigned their roles, as did seven parliamentary private secretaries. On the same day, 27 June, Corbyn announced changes to his Shadow Cabinet, moving Emily Thornberry (to Shadow Foreign Secretary), Diane Abbott (to Shadow Health Secretary), and appointing Pat Glass, Andy McDonald, Clive Lewis, Rebecca Long-Bailey, Kate Osamor, Rachael Maskell, Cat Smith and Dave Anderson to his Shadow Cabinet. Just two days later one of the newly appointed members, Pat Glass, resigned, saying "the situation is untenable".

A motion of no confidence in Corbyn as Labour leader was tabled by MPs Margaret Hodge and Ann Coffey on 24 June 2016. Hodge said: "This has been a tumultuous referendum which has been a test of leadership ... Jeremy has failed that test". Shadow Chancellor John McDonnell and union leaders including Len McCluskey condemned the motion.

On 28 June, he lost the vote of confidence by Labour Party MPs by 172–40. He responded with a statement that the motion had no "constitutional legitimacy" and that he intended to continue as the elected leader. The vote did not require the party to call a leadership election, but was expected to lead to a leadership challenge. Corbyn was encouraged to resign by Tom Watson and senior Labour politicians including his predecessor, Ed Miliband. Several union leaders (from GMB, UCATT, the CWU, the TSSA, ASLEF, the FBU, the BFWAU and the NUM) issued a joint statement saying that Corbyn was "the democratically-elected leader of Labour and his position should not be challenged except through the proper democratic procedures provided for in the party's constitution" and that a leadership election would be an "unnecessary distraction".

=== 2016 leadership challenge and election ===
The division between Corbyn and the Labour parliamentary party continued. On 11 July 2016, Angela Eagle, who had recently resigned from his Shadow Cabinet, formally launched her leadership campaign. After news reports that Eagle's office had been vandalised, and threats and abuse to other MPs, including death threats to himself, Corbyn said: "It is extremely concerning that Angela Eagle has been the victim of a threatening act" and called for "respect and dignity, even where there is disagreement."

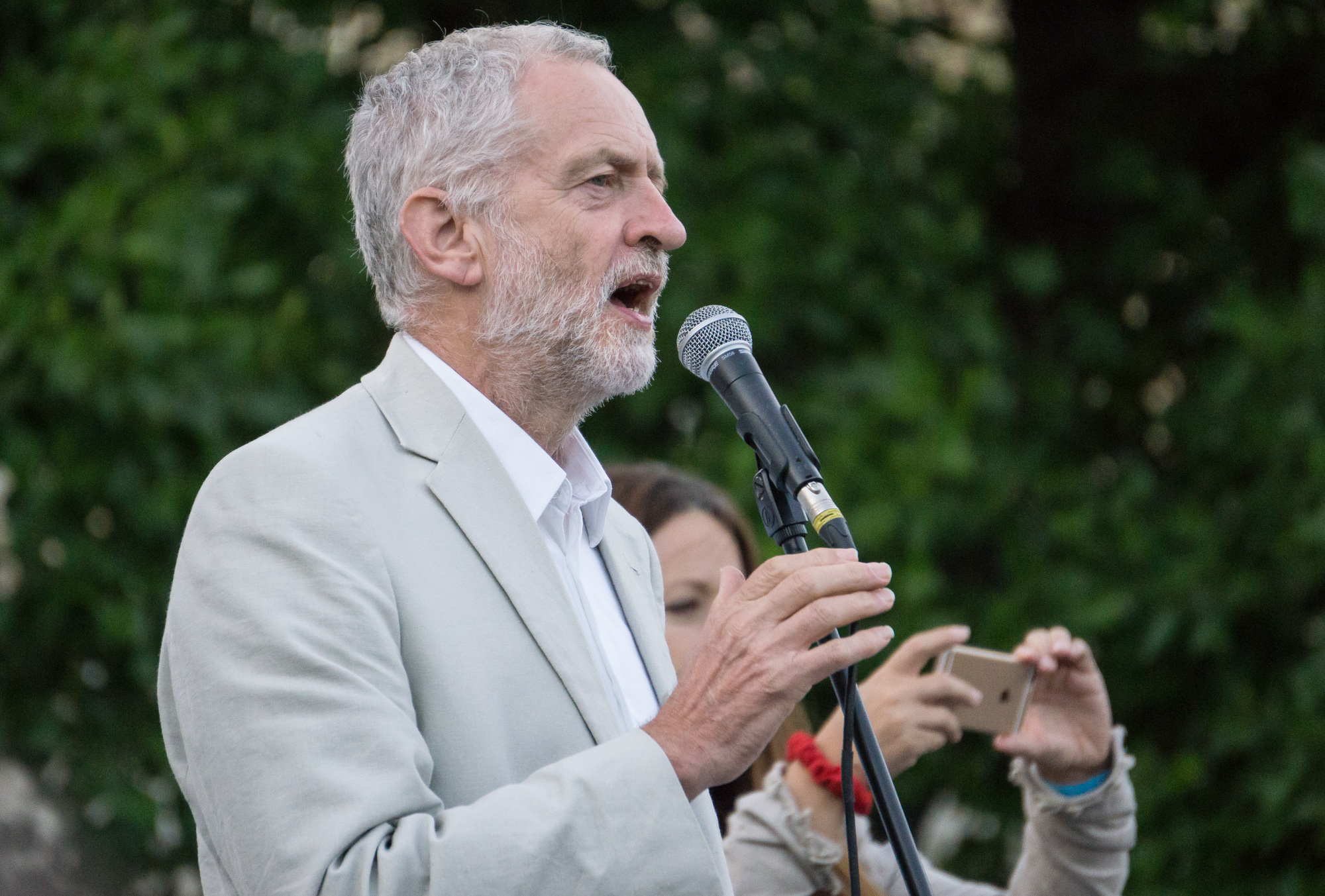
Corbyn at a leadership election rally in August 2016

On 12 July 2016, following a dispute as to whether the elected leader would need nominations in an election as a "challenger" to their own leadership, Labour's National Executive Committee (NEC) resolved that Corbyn, as the incumbent leader, had an automatic right to be on the ballot, and also decided that members needed to have been a member for more than six months to be eligible to vote, meaning that many members who had joined recently would not be able to vote. The NEC's decision was that "registered supporters" would be entitled to vote if they paid a one off fee of £25. 184,541 people subsequently paid the one-off fee to become "registered supporters" of the party during the two-day window in July, meaning that over 700,000 people had a vote in the leadership election. The decision to retain Corbyn on the ballot was contested unsuccessfully in a High Court action brought by Labour donor Michael Foster.

On 13 July, Owen Smith entered the Labour Party leadership race. Subsequently, on 19 July, Angela Eagle withdrew and offered her endorsement to Smith.

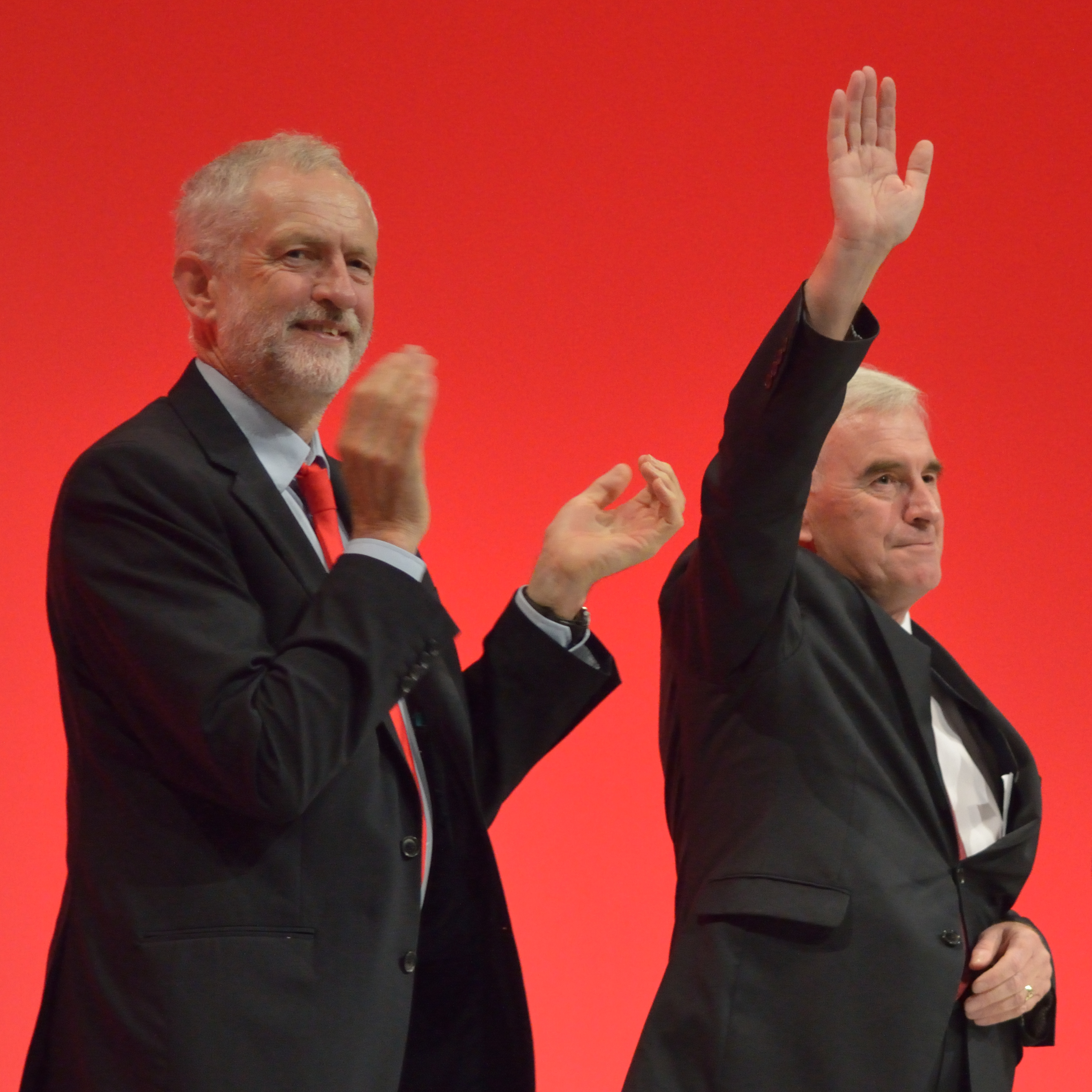
Corbyn with his Shadow Chancellor of the Exchequer John McDonnell at the 2016 Labour Party Conference

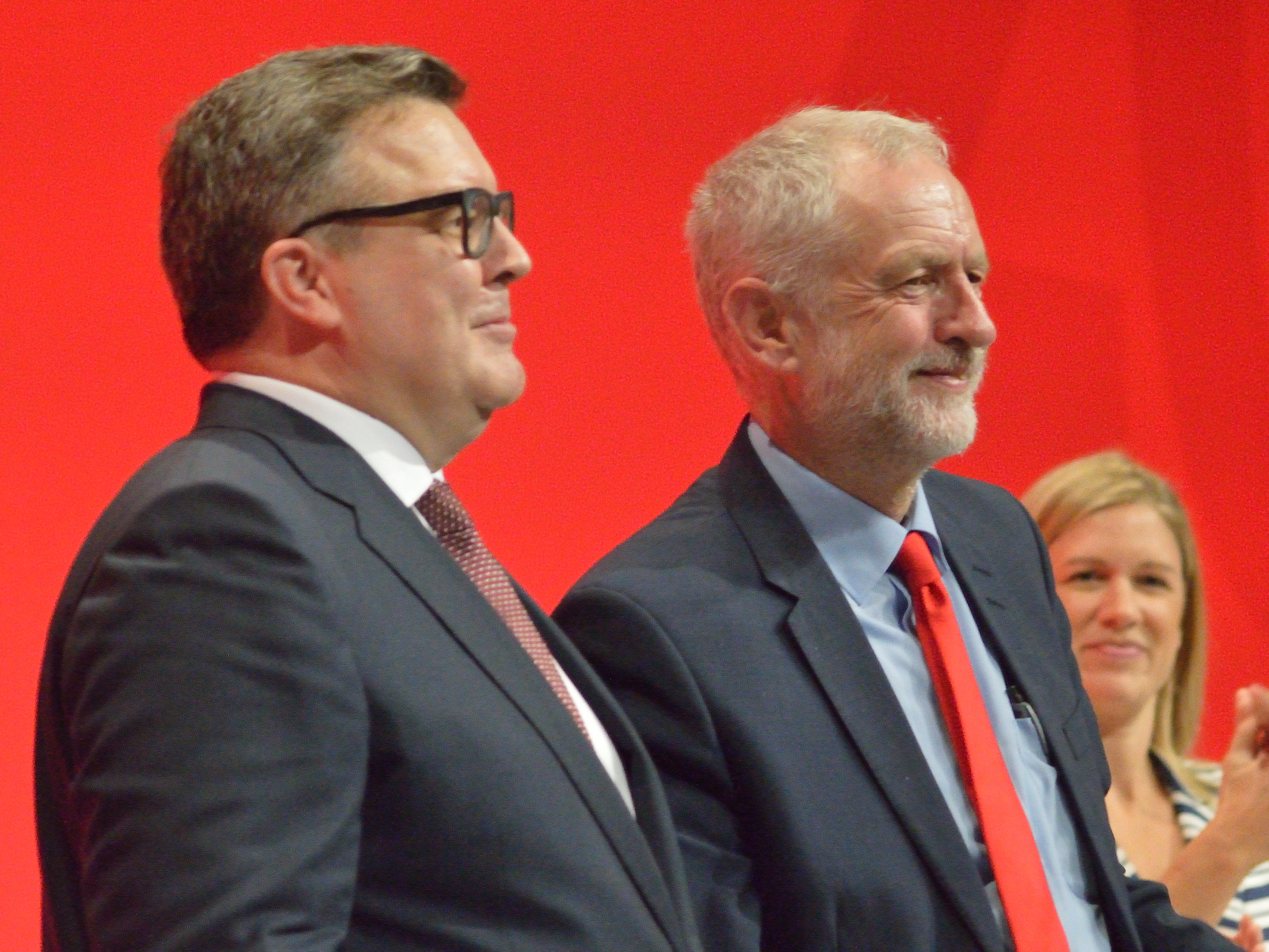
Corbyn with Deputy Leader of the Labour Party Tom Watson following re-election in 2016

A survey of the public on 14 July found that 66% of those surveyed believed that the Labour Party needed a new leader before the 2020 elections and only 23 per cent believed that Corbyn would make a good Prime Minister while Theresa May had an approval rating of 55 per cent. A later poll on 23 July found that among those who said they backed Labour, 54% supported Corbyn against just 22% who would prefer Smith. When voters were asked who they thought would be the best prime minister – Corbyn or Theresa May – among Labour supporters 48% said Corbyn and 22% May, among all UK voters 52% chose May and just 16% were for Corbyn.

More than 40 female Labour MPs, in an open letter during the campaign in July 2016, called on Corbyn to deal with issues relating to online abuse, and criticised him for his allegedly unsatisfactory responses and inaction. Speaking at the launch of policies intending to democratise the internet in late August, Corbyn described such abuse as "appalling". He continued: "I have set up a code of conduct on this. The Labour party has a code of conduct on this, and it does have to be dealt with".

On 16 August 2016, Corbyn released a video of himself sitting on the floor of a Virgin Trains East Coast train while travelling to a leadership hustings in Gateshead. Corbyn said the train was "ram-packed" and used this to support his policy to reverse the 1990s privatisation of the railways of Great Britain. A dispute, nicknamed Traingate in the media, developed a week later when Virgin released CCTV images appearing to show that Corbyn had walked past some available seats on the train before recording his video. Corbyn subsequently said that there had not been room for all his team to sit together, but that a train manager later found seats for him and his team, including his wife, by upgrading other passengers.

The psephologist John Curtice wrote just before Corbyn's second leadership win: "There is evidently a section of the British public, to be found particularly among younger voters, for whom the Labour leader does have an appeal; it just does not look like a section that is big enough, on its own at least, to enable Labour to win a general election". Meanwhile, on 23 September, a poll for The Independent by BMG Research suggested that working class voters were more likely to consider Corbyn "incompetent" than those from the middle class, and a higher proportion thought he was also "out of touch". Martin Kettle of The Guardian wrote that "many Labour MPs, even some who face defeat, want an early election" to prove decisively that Corbyn's Labour is unelectable as a government, stating that "If there is hope for Labour it lies with the voters. Only they can change the party".

Corbyn was re-elected as Labour leader on 24 September, with 313,209 votes (61.8%) compared to 193,229 (38.2%) for Owen Smith – a slightly increased share of the vote compared to his election in 2015, when he won 59%. On a turnout of 77.6%, Corbyn won the support of 59% of party members, 70% of registered supporters and 60% of affiliated supporters. In his acceptance speech, Corbyn called on the "Labour family" to end their divisions and to "wipe that slate clean from today and get on with the work we've got to do as a party". He continued: "Together, arguing for the real change this country needs, I have no doubt this party can win the next election whenever the Prime Minister decides to call it and form the next government."

=== Article 50 ===
In January 2017, Corbyn announced that he would impose a three-line whip to force Labour MPs to vote in favour of triggering Article 50 of the Treaty on European Union to initiate the withdrawal of the UK from the EU. In response, two Labour whips said they would vote against the bill. Tulip Siddiq, the shadow minister for early years, and Jo Stevens, the Shadow Welsh Secretary resigned in protest. On 1 February, forty seven Labour MPs defied Corbyn's whip on the second reading of the bill.

=== May 2017 local elections ===
At the 2017 local elections, Labour lost nearly 400 councillors and control of Derbyshire and Nottinghamshire county councils. The BBC's Projected National Vote Share was 38% for the Conservatives, 27% for Labour, 18% for the Liberal Democrats and 5% for UKIP, with others on around 12%.

=== 2017 general election ===
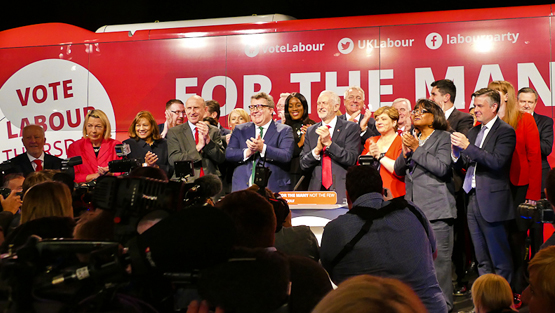
Corbyn with members of his Shadow Cabinet in EventCity, Greater Manchester, at the Labour Party 2017 General Election Launch

Corbyn said he welcomed May's proposal to seek an early general election in 2017. He said his party should support the government's move in the parliamentary vote. The Labour campaign focused on social issues like health care, education and ending austerity.

Earlier in the year, Corbyn had become the first opposition party leader since 1982 to lose a by-election to an incumbent government, and at the time May called the election Labour trailed the Conservative Party by up to 25 points in some opinion polls. A large Conservative majority was widely predicted. Following the short campaign, Labour again finished as the second largest party in parliament but surprised many pundits by increasing their share of the popular vote to 40%, resulting in a net gain of 30 seats and a hung parliament. Although Labour started the campaign as far as 20 points behind, it defied expectations by gaining 40% of the vote, its greatest share since 2001. It was the first time Labour had made a net gain of seats since 1997, and the party's 9.6% increase in vote share was its largest in a single general election since 1945. This has partly been attributed to the popularity of its 2017 Manifesto that promised to scrap tuition fees, address public sector pay, make housing more affordable, end austerity, nationalise the railways and provide school students with free lunches.

Corbyn's election campaign was run under the slogan "For the Many, Not the Few" and featured rallies with a large audience and connected with a grassroots following for the party, including appearing on stage in front of a crowd of 20,000 at the Wirral Live Festival in Prenton Park. He chose to take part in television debates and dressed more professionally than usual, wearing a business suit and tie. He said the result was a public call for the end of "austerity politics" and suggested May should step down as prime minister. Corbyn said that he had received the largest vote for a winning candidate in the history of his borough.

=== Leaked Labour Party report on antisemitism ===
In April 2020, an internal Labour Party report, entitled The work of the Labour Party's Governance and Legal Unit in relation to antisemitism, 2014–2019, was leaked to the media. The report was completed in the last months of Corbyn's leadership and was meant to form part of the Labour Party's submission to the Equality and Human Rights Commission (EHRC) inquiry into Labour's approach to dealing with antisemitism. It included 10,000 emails and thousands of private WhatsApp communications between former senior party officials. The Labour Party had, after the intervention of party lawyers, decided not to submit the report to the EHRC.

According to the report there was "an abnormal intensity of factional opposition" to Corbyn which had "inhibited the proper functioning of the Labour Party bureaucracy". The report included what it alleges were examples of how senior Labour Party officials including former party general secretary Iain McNicol worked to undermine Labour's campaign in the 2017 general election in order to force a change of leader. The report revealed that senior party officials sent insulting WhatsApp messages about leftwing MPs, including Diane Abbott, and officials in Corbyn's office. Prior to the 2017 election, officials discussed using party resources to assist candidates critical of Corbyn, such as deputy leader Tom Watson. The report stated that officials operated a "secret key seats team from where a parallel general election campaign was run to support MPs associated with the right wing of the party". The officials expressed dismay over the party's unexpectedly strong results in the 2017 general election. In response to the report, Labour MP Kate Osamor called for the expulsion of those involved. In contrast New Statesman political editor Stephen Bush wrote in the New Statesman that the "report's summary writes a cheque that its findings cannot cash".

In May 2020, the Labour Party National Executive Committee (NEC) appointed barrister Martin Forde to chair an investigation into the leaked report on antisemitism. The inquiry was set up to examine the contents of the report as well as how it was authored and leaked. It was expected to release its findings in 2021, but was delayed indefinitely over concerns it could prejudice an investigation by the information commissioner into the leak, eventually being published in July 2022. In Corbyn's submission to the Forde inquiry, submitted jointly with eight other colleagues, he was reported to have accused officials of sabotage and said their diversion of funds could constitute fraud. The diverted funds refer to the "Bespoke Materials Service" (sometimes referred to as the 'Ergon House Project'), which represented 1.2 per cent of Labour's total election spend and was focused towards certain Labour-held seats rather than offensive targets. BMS was apparently not disclosed to Corbyn's office. Officials said their targeting was due to fears Labour would lose seats, based on its poor polling position at the start of the campaign, and that three of the seats supported by BMS were less than 500 votes away from being lost to the Conservatives. The 2017 campaigns chief, Patrick Heneghan also stated that Corbyn's office had demanded he divert funds towards a list of Labour-held seats, some with majorities of over 10,000, to help MPs were considered allies of Corbyn, including Ian Lavery and Jon Trickett. Heneghan said the use of funds in BMS was legal, as it had been authorised by the General Secretary, and stated it had been kept from Corbyn's office because staffers believed they were "in a bind" and "felt it was pointless to try and discuss this sensibly with Jeremy's staff".

The Guardian reported that "[w]hile the leaked report does show hostility to Corbyn during the 2017 election, and even dismay among some officials when he did better than expected, there is seemingly no proof of active obstruction" by Labour officials and that there was "an argument that any evidence of election-scuppering is circumstantial rather than a smoking gun". In July 2022, the Forde Report concluded that while the leader's office and party staff "were trying to win in different ways", it was "highly unlikely" this cost Labour the 2017 election (see Publication of Forde Report).

=== Opinion polling ===
Opinion polls during the first few months of his leadership gave Corbyn lower personal approval ratings than any previous Labour leader in the early stages of their leadership amongst the general public. His approval amongst party members was initially strong reaching a net approval of +45 in May 2016, though this fell back sharply to just +3 by the end of the next month following criticism of Corbyn's handling of the EU referendum and a string of Shadow Cabinet resignations.

A poll by Election Data in February 2017 found that 50% of Labour voters wanted Corbyn to stand down by the next election, while 44% wanted him to stay. In the same month, YouGov found party members' net approval rating of Corbyn was 17%, whereas a year earlier the result found by the same pollsters had been 55%. Also during February 2017, Ipsos MORI found Corbyn's satisfaction rating among the electorate as a whole was minus 38%; among Labour voters it was minus 9%.

Polling by the end of the first week of campaigning during the 2017 general election was suggesting a defeat for Labour with the parliamentary party much reduced and a landslide victory for the Conservatives with a majority of perhaps 150 MPs. An ITV Wales/YouGov poll at this time placed the Conservatives on 40% in Wales against Labour's 30%; Labour MPs have formed a majority in Wales since the 1922 election. An opinion poll published on 22 May suggested that the position had been reversed, with Labour now polling 44% in Wales and the Conservatives 34%. Polls following the publication of the Labour and Conservative manifestos suggested that nationally, Labour was narrowing the Conservative lead to nine points, with YouGov putting the party on 35% of the vote. The final election polls predicted an increased majority for the Conservatives.

== Second term as Leader of the Opposition (2017–2019) ==
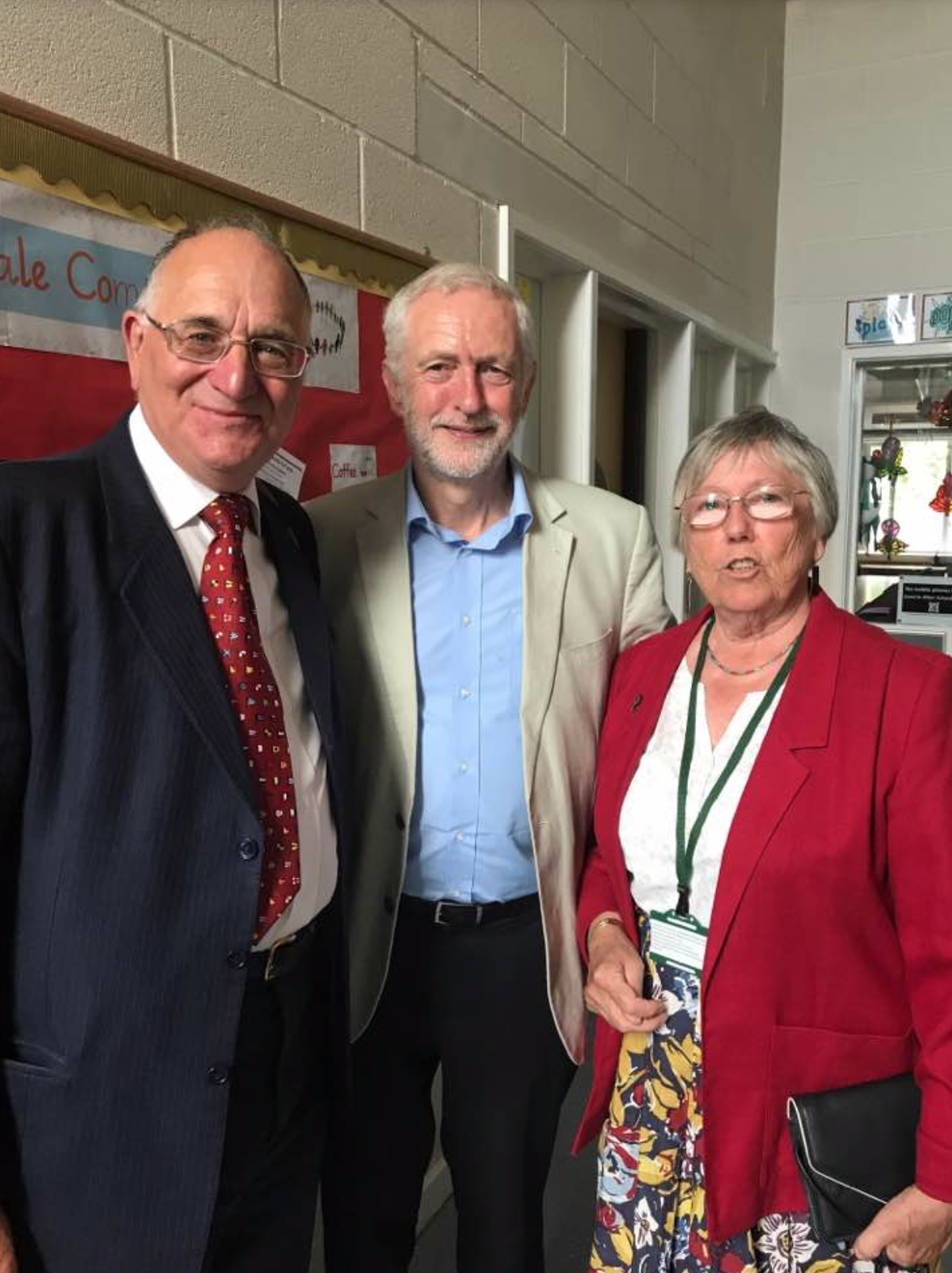
Corbyn in Shropshire in 2017, meeting local councillor Beryl Mason and former MEP David Hallam

=== June 2017 Shadow Cabinet dismissals ===
Corbyn sacked three Shadow Cabinet members and a fourth resigned after they rebelled against party orders to abstain on a motion aimed at keeping the UK in the EU single market, which was put forward by Labour MP Chuka Umunna.

=== Salisbury poisoning response ===
On 15 March 2018, Corbyn wrote in The Guardian that "to rush way ahead of the evidence" about Russia's involvement in the Salisbury poisoning "serves neither justice nor our national security" and that responsibility for the attack "is a matter for police and security professionals to determine". However, he also said that Theresa May was right "to identify two possibilities for the source of the attack in Salisbury [...] Either this was a crime authored by the Russian state; or that state has allowed these deadly toxins to slip out of the control it has an obligation to exercise." This sparked a row within the Labour Party, with more than 30 backbenchers signing an Early Day Motion "unequivocally" blaming Russia for the attack and several frontbenchers, including shadow foreign secretary Emily Thornberry, shadow defence secretary Nia Griffith and shadow Brexit secretary Sir Keir Starmer, stating that Russia was to blame. A poll on 17 March found only 16% of voters believed Corbyn would be the best person to deal with the UK's relations with Russia, compared to 39% saying Theresa May.

On 20 March, Corbyn called for the British authorities to send a sample of the nerve agent involved in the poisoning to Russia, so they could "say categorically one way or the other" where it came from. A few days later, Corbyn was satisfied that the evidence pointed to Russia. Polling between 10–13 April found only 23% of voters believed Corbyn had handled the situation well, with 44% (including 28% of 2017 Labour voters) believing he had handled it badly.

Corbyn advisor Andrew Murray later said that the Salisbury attack was "something we got wrong", saying "evidence that's emerged since is overwhelming". Murray said that at the time Corbyn and his team "just didn't think the Russian state would be so stupid and brazen as to [...] carry out a poisoning attack on British soil", although he admitted "given the Litvinenko precedent perhaps we should have done". Murray also suggested the response was the turning point for Corbyn's leadership, as it "started bringing all the doubts about Jeremy and the leader's office to the surface again".

=== Developments of the Labour Party's Brexit policies ===
Following the 2017 general election, the party faced internal pressure to shift its Brexit policy away from a soft Brexit and towards a second referendum, a position widely supported among the party membership. In response, Corbyn said at the 2018 Labour Party conference that he did not support a second referendum but would abide by the decision of members at the conference. The party conference decided to support a Brexit deal either negotiated by the Conservatives and meeting certain conditions or negotiated by Labour in government. The conference agreed to use all means to stop an unacceptable Brexit deal, including another referendum including an option to remain in the EU, as a last resort. A week after seven Labour MPs left the party in February 2019 to form The Independent Group, partly in protest over Labour's Brexit position, the Labour leadership said it would support another referendum "as a final resort in order to stop a damaging Tory Brexit being forced on the country". Following an exodus of Remain voters from Labour at the 2019 European Parliament elections, Corbyn said he was "listening very carefully" after key members of his Shadow Cabinet including John McDonnell said publicly Labour should back a second referendum under any circumstances. In July 2019, Corbyn announced Labour's policy was now that there must be a referendum on any Brexit deal, including the deal Labour would attempt to negotiate if it entered government, and that the party would campaign for Remain against any Tory Brexit. During the 2019 election Corbyn would promise to take a "neutral stance" during the referendum on any Brexit deal his government would negotiate.

=== Breakaway group of Labour MPs ===
In February 2019, seven MPs – Chuka Umunna, Luciana Berger, Chris Leslie, Angela Smith, Mike Gapes, Gavin Shuker and Ann Coffey – resigned from the Labour Party to form The Independent Group, citing Corbyn's handling of Brexit and of allegations of antisemitism. They were soon joined by Joan Ryan, while Ian Austin resigned to sit as an independent. TIG later rebranded as Change UK, and all of the defecting MPs left Parliament at the 2019 general election, with some losing their seats, others not seeking re-election, and some standing and losing in different constituencies from the ones that they had previously held.

=== Relationship with Muslims ===
In 2017, Corbyn attended an event held by the Muslim Engagement and Development. In 2018, Corbyn condemned the escalation of Islamophobia in the United Kingdom following a terrorist attack at the Finsbury Park Mosque and supported the Muslim Council of Britain's calls for an investigation into Islamophobia in the Conservative Party. During the 2019 general election, around 80% of British Muslims voted for the Labour Party. Following Corbyn's departure as Labour leader, this declined to just over 60% in the 2024 general election as anger towards Keir Starmer’s stance on the Gaza conflict led Muslim voters to vote for the Green Party and pro-Palestinian Independents, such as Corbyn.

=== Other events ===
In 2018, Conservative MP Ben Bradley posted a tweet saying that Jeremy Corbyn had passed British secrets to a spy from Czechoslovakia. Corbyn threatened legal action against Bradley, which resulted in Bradley deleting the tweet, apologising for his comments which he accepted were "untrue and false", and agreeing to pay Corbyn's legal costs and to donate to a charity of Corbyn's choice.

In March 2019, Corbyn was assaulted by a Brexit supporter outside a mosque in Finsbury Park, North London. His attacker was sentenced to 28 days in jail.

A video of soldiers from the 3rd Battalion, Parachute Regiment, stationed in Afghanistan using an image of Corbyn for target practice was posted on social media in April 2019. Momentum said the video due to the "radicalising effect the rightwing press is having". The Independent expressed the view that Corbyn was "unpopular in parts of the military because of his past policies on Northern Ireland, Trident and opposition to the Iraq War and other foreign interventions". In July 2019, the soldiers involved received reprimands, with two being demoted.

In 2019, Corbyn refused an invitation to attend a state banquet for Donald Trump, hosted by Queen Elizabeth II during the president's June visit to the UK. Corbyn then attended a London protest outside Trump and May's joint press conference and requested a meeting with Trump to discuss issues such as the "climate emergency, threats to peace and the refugee crisis". Trump rejected the request, saying that Corbyn was a "negative force".

=== 2019 general election and resignation ===
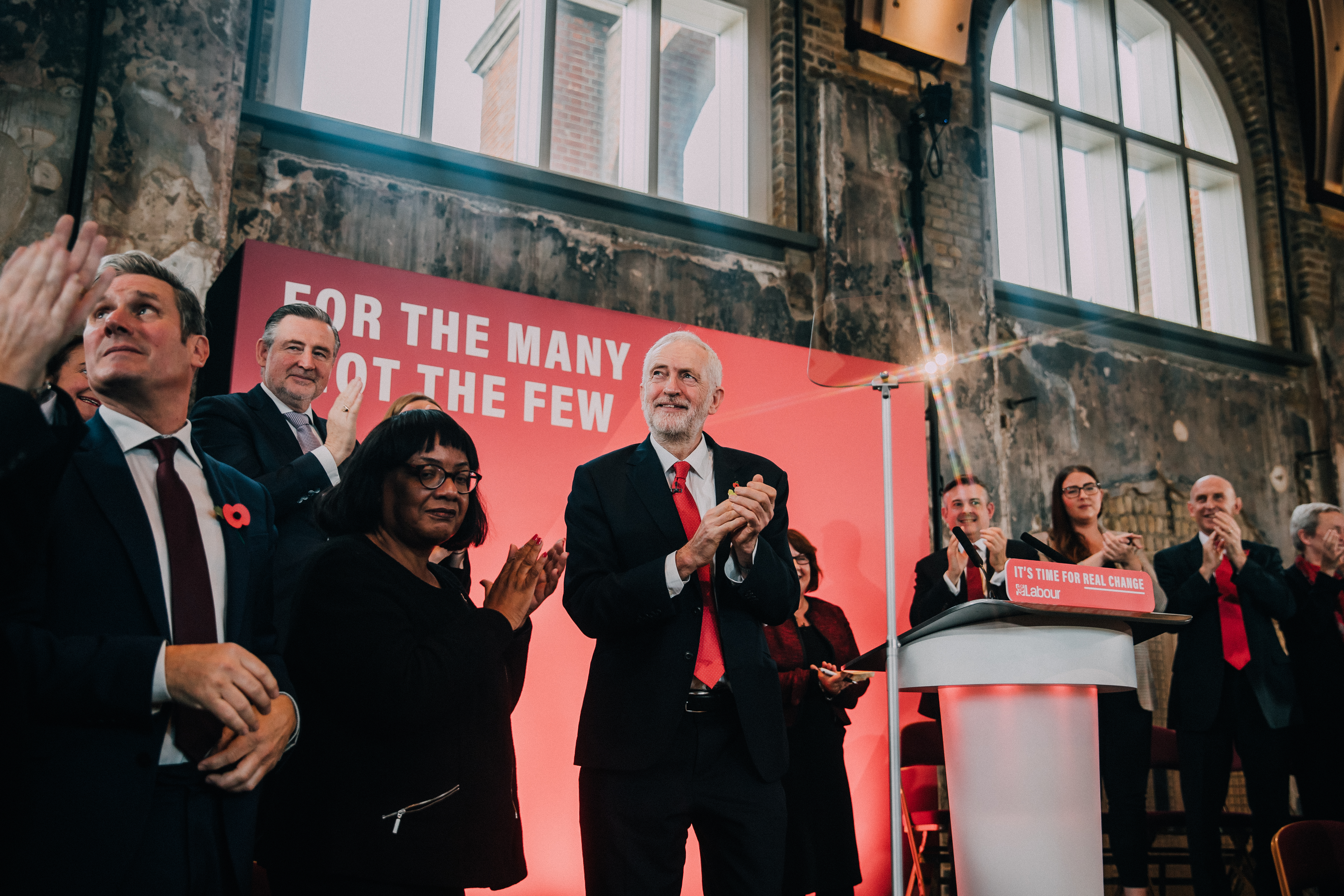
Corbyn launching the Labour Party's 2019 general election campaign

In May 2019, May announced her resignation and stood down as prime minister in July, following the election of her replacement, former Foreign Secretary Boris Johnson. Corbyn said that Labour was ready to fight an election against Johnson.

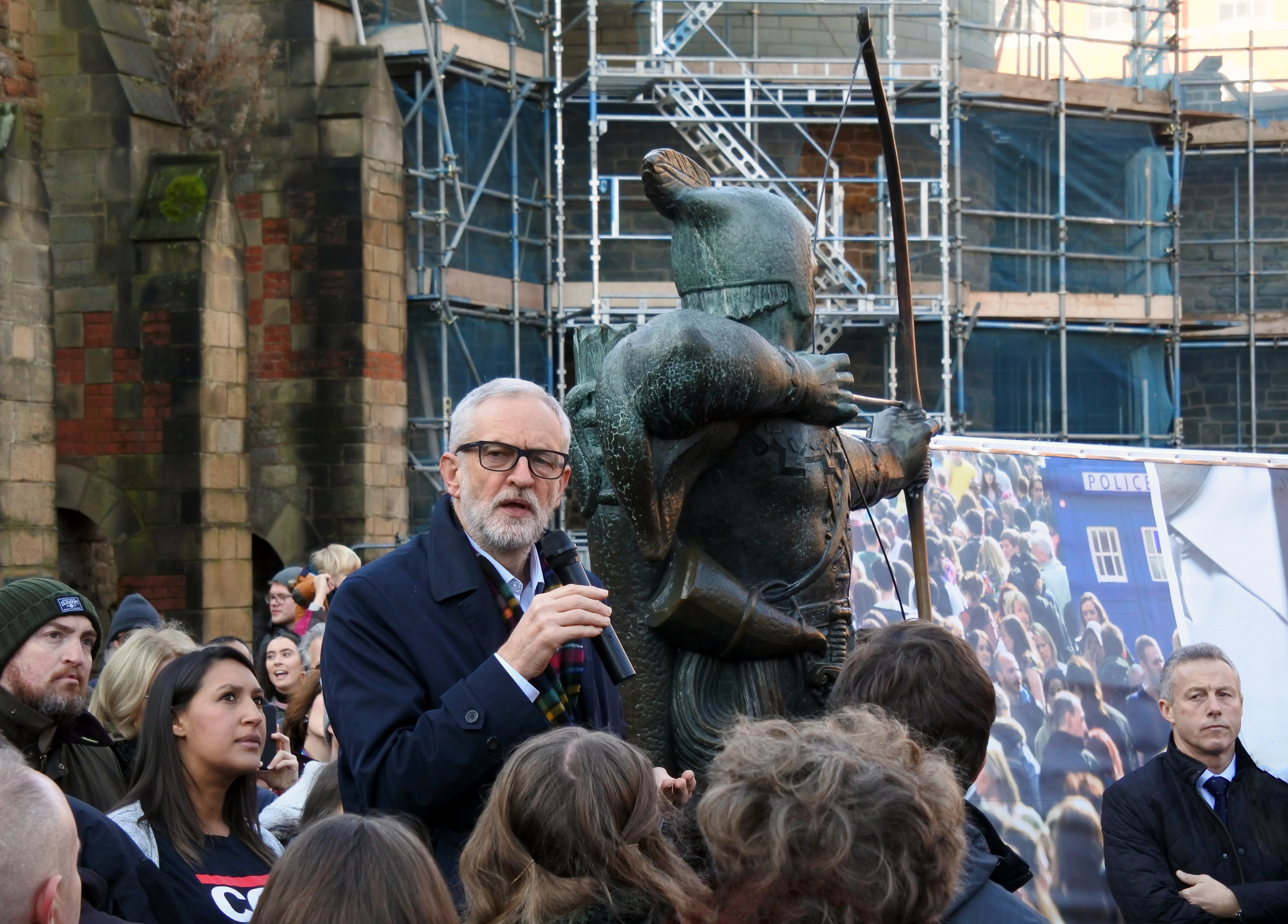
Corbyn campaigning in the 2019 general election at Nottingham Castle

The 2019 Labour Party Manifesto included policies to increase funding for health, negotiate a Brexit deal and hold a referendum giving a choice between the deal and remain, raise the minimum wage, stop the age pension age increase, nationalise key industries, and replace universal credit. Due to the plans to nationalise the "big six" energy firms, the National Grid, the water industry, Royal Mail, the railways and the broadband arm of BT, the 2019 manifesto was widely considered as the most radical in several decades, more closely resembling Labour's politics of the 1970s than subsequent decades.

During the campaign for the upcoming general elections, Corbyn was accused by the Hindu Council UK of promoting anti-Hindu sentiments following his disparaging comments on the caste system & his condemnation of the Hindu-right wing Bharatiya Janata Party led Indian government's revocation of the special status of Jammu and Kashmir. Many Hindus living in the UK saw Corbyn to be under the influence of the Pakistani Muslims, with whom he shared a common pro-Palestinian stance. This culminated in the Jammu Kashmir Liberation Front, a Pakistan sponsored Islamist separatist group designated as a terrorist organisation by the Indian government known for forcibly expelling Kashmiri Hindus out of the Kashmir Valley in the 1990s, declaraing its support for Corbyn in the elections. This resulted in large number of Hindus not voting for the Labour Party.

The 2019 general election was the worst defeat in seats for Labour since 1935, with Labour winning just 202 out of 650 seats, their fourth successive election defeat. At 32.2%, Labour's share of the vote was down around eight points on the 2017 general election and is lower than that achieved by Neil Kinnock in 1992, although it was higher than in 2010 and 2015. In the aftermath, opinions differed to why the Labour Party was defeated to the extent it was. The Shadow Chancellor John McDonnell largely blamed Brexit and the media representation of the party. Tony Blair argued that the party's unclear position on Brexit and the economic policy pursued by the Corbyn leadership were to blame.

Following the Labour Party's unsuccessful performance in the 2019 general election, Corbyn conceded defeat and stated that he intended to step down as leader following the election of a successor and that he would not lead the party into the next election. Corbyn himself was re-elected for Islington North with 64.3% of the vote share and a majority of 26,188 votes over the runner-up candidate representing the Liberal Democrats, with Labour's share of the vote falling by 8.7%. The Guardian described the results as a "realignment" of UK politics as the Conservative landslide took many traditionally Labour seats in England and Wales. Corbyn insisted that he had "pride in the manifesto" that Labour put forward and blamed the defeat on Brexit. According to polling by Lord Ashcroft, Corbyn was himself a major contribution to the party's defeat.

On 4 April 2020, the results of the 2020 Labour Party leadership election were announced, with Keir Starmer winning the election and succeeding Corbyn as the leader of the Labour Party.

=== Opinion polling ===
In the months following the 2017 election, Labour consistently had a small lead in opinion polling. After Johnson became prime minister in July 2019, he gained double-digit leads over Corbyn on the "Best PM" question, although Corbyn was seen to be "more in touch" with ordinary people than Johnson. Labour fell behind the Conservatives, partly because it lost some of its pro-Remain support to the Liberal Democrats.

== See also ==
- Keir Starmer as Leader of the Opposition – Corbyn's successor in the role
- Labour Party leadership of Ed Miliband – Corbyn's predecessor in the role
