= L'Enfant (poster) =

1986 photographic poster

- Man and Baby
- Artist: Spencer Rowell
- Completion date: 26 May 1986
- Medium: Photographic print
- Subject: Monochrome studio shot of a semi-naked male model cradling a baby

L'Enfant (also known as Man and Baby) is a 1986 photographic poster depicting a shirtless male model (Adam Perry) holding a young baby. The image, conceived by Paul Rodriguez, was photographed by Spencer Rowell and published in the 1980s by British company Athena Posters. The image reportedly sold over 5 million copies, making it among the best-selling posters ever. The photograph was said to herald the "sensitive but sexy New Man" aesthetic. Senator Josh Hawley once hung the photo over his dorm room bed at Stanford.

In a 2004 British television documentary about L'Enfant, titled The Model, the Poster and 3,000 Women, Perry claimed that as a result of his poster fame he had slept with 3,000 women. The programme also identified the baby as Greek-Cypriot Stelios Havatzios. As of 2007, Havatzios lives in Limassol, Cyprus with his family and works as a lawyer, and Perry, who was paid £100 for the photo shoot, works as a carpenter based in London.

In 2011, the poster became part of the V&A Print collection.

== See also ==
- Tennis Girl
