= Train overcrowding in the United Kingdom =

Rail passengers in Great Britain from 1829 to 2023, showing the early era of small railway companies, the amalgamation into the 'big four', nationalisation, and finally the current era of privatisation.

Train overcrowding, technically known as "passengers in excess of capacity" is a major source of public complaint about railway travel in the United Kingdom. Large numbers of commuters have to stand on trains into and out of London, and other major cities, with more than a third of passengers standing on some services. Public resentment about overcrowding, combined with the high prices of tickets, have made this a political issue.

== Most overcrowded services ==
As of 2014, of the ten most overcrowded train services, six were services to and from the London mainline stations London Paddington, London Victoria, and London Waterloo stations, three were services to or from Manchester Airport, and the other was part of the Thameslink Brighton to Bedford service, passing through London Blackfriars station which, as of 2016, has been described as the most overcrowded in the country.

== Reasons for overcrowding ==
As of 2016, the growth in train overcrowding is largely attributed to increased passenger demand, and the 'walk-up' nature of British railways, in which seat reservations are not required, combined with the inability to run extra trains due to the limitations of the current railway signalling system. To resolve the latter problem, a transition to the European Train Control System (ETCS) is planned, which would allow many more trains to be run; by permitting them to be run closer together, while maintaining similar safety margins, potentially doubling capacity on some routes at busy times.

Passenger demand can often reach up to double the available seat capacity. Because of the different classes of train tickets, passengers with second class tickets often have to stand, even when empty seats are available in first class carriages. Although reserved seats on many trains may be occupied if they are not taken up by the passenger who has booked them, many passengers are not aware of this.

== Solutions to overcrowding ==
To further increase rail transport capacity, there is a large ongoing programme of upgrades to the network, including Thameslink, Crossrail, electrification of lines, in-cab signalling, the Northern Hub, new inter-city trains, and a new high-speed line.

== Other ==
In August 2016, Jeremy Corbyn, the Labour Party leader, was featured in a video showing him sitting on the floor of a train, in which he made a statement about overcrowding. The video, and the subsequent controversy regarding it, became known as 'Traingate'.

== See also ==
- First class travel § United Kingdom
