= Beyond City Limits =

Athena Poster Beyond City Limits by Alwyn R Coates

Beyond City Limits is a photographic black-and-white, colour-tinted poster depicting a man and a woman sitting on a motorbike in Surrey with a dramatic fake sky superimposed. The image was taken by UK-based photographer Alwyn R Coates and was published and distributed in the 1990s by British company Athena Posters. The poster reportedly became a best seller.
