= Athena (retailer) =

British art retailer and retail chain

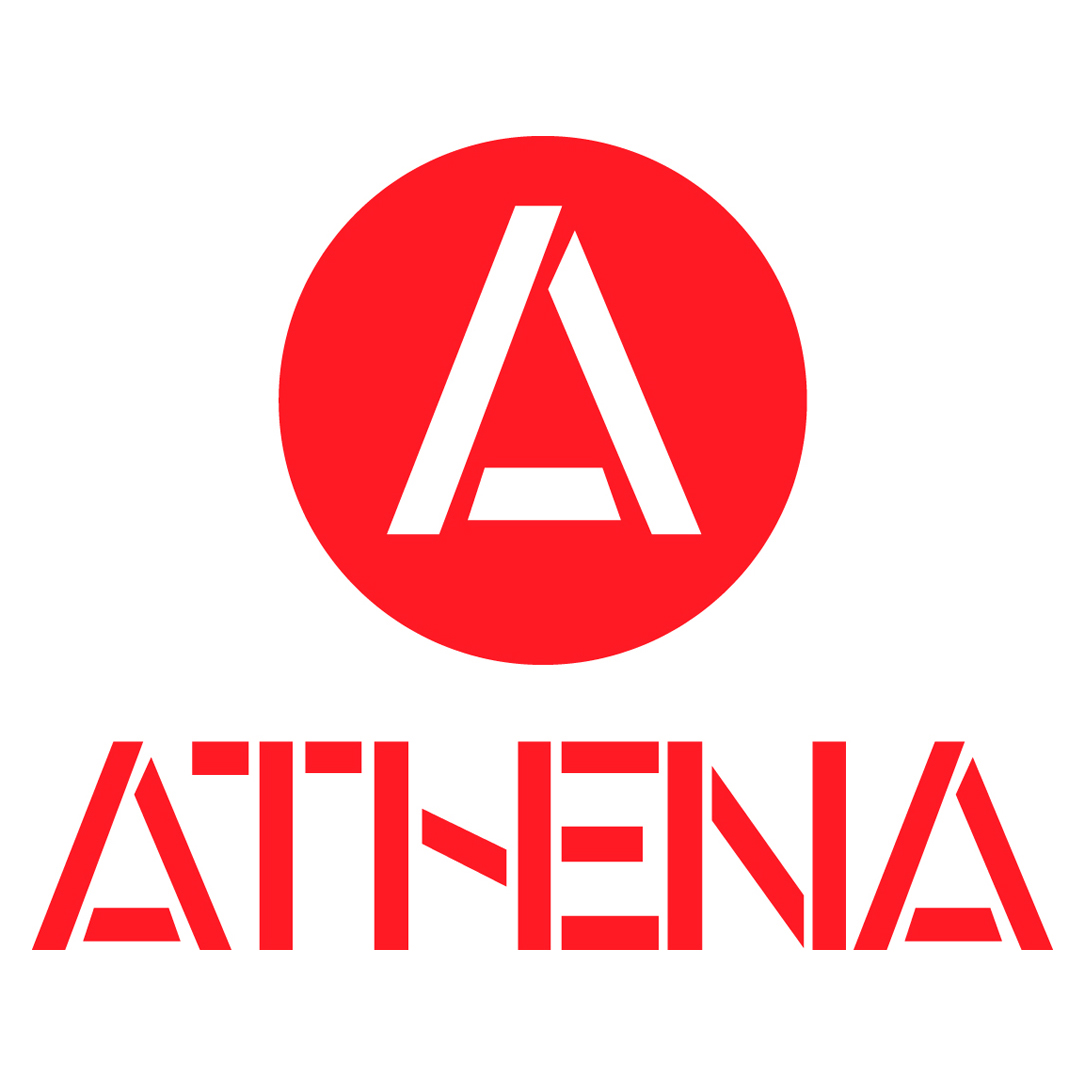
- Industry: Retail
- Founded: 1964
- Founder: Ole Christensen
- Products: Fine Art prints
- Website: www.athenaart.com

Athena is a British art retailer and retail chain, which was founded in 1964. Today it sells fine art prints from a variety of UK artists. However it is best known for its iconic posters such as L'Enfant (a picture of a muscular man cradling a baby), The Lord of the Rings from 1976 by Jimmy Cauty, the Tennis Girl poster from 1976 and "Beyond City Limits", published in the 1990s. The company's popular success divided opinion amongst intellectuals and art critics who were uncertain as to whether these works were too vulgar and populist to be considered art.

Athena's first shop was opened by Ole Christensen in Hampstead, London, in July 1964, and then bought by E&O which expanded Athena to 60 shops, making sure to keep the ethos on fine art reprints.

Eventually the chain was sold off by E&O in 1977 to the Pentos Group before Athena went into administration when it failed in 1995. The profitable stores were reopened by its former franchisees but the last of these shops in Exeter ceased trading in September 2014, bringing its high street era to an end.

Athena now operates as an online gallery and art retailer.
