= Tennis Girl =

1977 British poster

Tennis Girl

The Tennis Girl is a British poster of a female tennis player without underwear that has become a British pop icon.

== Creation ==
The photograph was taken by 30-year-old Martin Elliott in September 1976 and featured his 18-year-old girlfriend Fiona Butler (now Walker). The photo was taken at the University of Birmingham's tennis courts (formerly Edgbaston Lawn Tennis Club) on Edgbaston Park Road, Birmingham, England. The site is occupied now by the university's Tennis Court halls of residence. The dress was hand-made by Butler's friend Carol Knotts, from a Simplicity Pattern with added lace trim. Knotts also supplied the tennis racquet, with all of the borrowed items later returned by Butler to Knotts after the shoot with a box of chocolates. Butler borrowed the plimsoll shoes from her father, whilst the tennis balls were those used as playthings by her family's pet dog.

== History ==
The image was first published as part of a calendar by Athena for the 1977 Silver Jubilee, the same year Virginia Wade achieved the Wimbledon ladies' singles title. Athena then negotiated a licence to distribute the image as a poster, and from 1978 it achieved widespread distribution, selling over 2 million copies at £2 each (equivalent to £11 in 2025). Although Athena went into administration in 1995, the picture remains a popular print.

Butler, who broke up with Elliot three years later, said in retrospect that she was not embarrassed about posing, nor bitter that she did not receive any royalties from the photo. Butler (now Walker) is a mother of three, who works as a freelance illustrator in Droitwich Spa, Worcestershire. Elliott died on 24 March 2010.

Knotts, now a barrister living in Gloucestershire, put the dress and racquet up for sale at an auction on 5 July 2014, the day of the 2014 Wimbledon Championships – Women's Singles final. The dress was sold for £15,000 (equivalent to £20,700 in 2025), while the racquet went for between £1,000 and £2,000 (equivalent to between £1,400 and £2,800 in 2025). The Athena Tennis Girl poster dress is now part of the Wimbledon Museum collection.

=== Subject doubts ===
In February 2015, Peter Atkinson from Marsh Gate, Cornwall, came forward to insist the photo was actually of his ex-wife, producing in evidence two items, one showing the same image and the other a close variant (seemingly taken on the same occasion), both of which were dated 1974, two years before Fiona Butler's photo shoot.

Atkinson had previously made the claim, on numerous occasions, that his ex-wife was the actual model, and had done so during Elliott's lifetime. Elliott consistently denied such claims.

== Parody ==
Over the years, the picture has been parodied by various people as diverse as former tennis star Pat Cash, singer and actress Kylie Minogue and comedian Alan Carr with actor Keith Lemon featuring his parody in his 2012 calendar.

In 1997 Ginsters, of Cornwall, parodied the advert with the racket being swapped for a Ginsters pasty, but the Advertising Standards Authority banned the advert, for being too crude. The model in the advert was 21-year-old Misha Lee, from Czechoslovakia. The advert caption was 'I used to stop for new balls. Now I only stop for a Ginsters.' The advert had been displayed all over the country. Ginsters were told by the ASA that 'whilst nudity was acceptable for advertising perfumes or toiletries, it had nothing to do with snack foods and was therefore not allowed'.

As an election promise for the 2012 Belgian elections, Milka Malfait, a 22-year-old candidate from Sint-Truiden promised to publish a nude photo shoot when receiving 1,000 votes. She released a picture of herself in the Tennis Girl pose prior to the elections.

In 2009, it was also parodied in the exit scene from episode 12 from the sixth series of Shameless when Lillian Tyler, a character played by Alice Barry, gets up and walks towards the door after winning a game console version of tennis.

The background of a Martin Rowson cartoon entitled "Don't feed the Trolls" appears to show a poster of Donald Trump as Tennis Girl.

The poster is one of the recurring motifs in the season 12 premiere of the British sitcom Not Going Out.

== See also ==
- Sports photography
