= Traingate =

2016 political scandal

Traingate is the popular name given to a 2016 disputed incident between Jeremy Corbyn, leader of the British Labour Party, and the train operating company Virgin Trains East Coast (VTEC) and its minority shareholder Richard Branson.

During August 2016, a video was released of Corbyn sitting on the floor of a VTEC train while campaigning during a leadership challenge by Owen Smith. Corbyn said the train was "ram-packed" and used this to support his policy to reverse the 1990s privatisation of the railways of Great Britain, which created private operators such as VTEC.

Controversy developed when Virgin released CCTV images a week later appearing to show Corbyn walking past available seats, leading to accusations that the incident had been staged for political gain, which Corbyn denied, saying, "Yes, I did walk through the train. Yes, I did look for two empty seats together so I could sit down with my wife, to talk to her. That wasn't possible so I went to the end of the train." Reactions were mixed, with commentators finding both support and damage for all sides involved.

Analysis of the CCTV footage was later done by a media outlet paid by the reelection bid of Jeremy Corbyn in the then-Labour leadership contest. This showed that the unreserved seats in some of the images were occupied and that other passengers also sat in the vestibules.

== Background ==
The railways of Great Britain were privatised in the 1990s, passing ownership and operation of trains and track to private companies (although the track was later taken back into public control through Network Rail). Passenger trains continue to be operated by a number of private companies, awarded through a system of franchising. As a result of increased demand on an ageing network largely built in the Victorian era, train overcrowding has become a significant issue and a source of public discontent.

Virgin Trains East Coast, a joint venture between Stagecoach Group (90%) and Virgin Group (10%), commenced operating the East Coast franchise in April 2015 after a period of public operation following renationalisation in November 2009 after National Express East Coast defaulted on the previous franchise. As it is one of the more profitable routes, in return for the right to operate the franchise for eight years from 2015, VTEC has committed to pay the government a £3.3 billion premium over eight years, and invest £140 million in improvements.

Jeremy Corbyn became leader of the Labour Party in September 2015. Renationalisation had been one of Corbyn's key pledges during his 2015 leadership election and upon its formal adoption at the subsequent Labour Party Conference, Corbyn told the audience, "We will be running our railways in the interests of passengers and taxpayers." According to The Guardian, its adoption as official party policy had been a significant boost for Corbyn, who had suffered a series of setbacks over the European Union and the renewal of the Trident nuclear deterrent. It stated Corbyn believed this showed that policies which had once been dismissed as leftwing, could be "hugely popular among mainstream voters". The specific policy called for a rolling program of renationalisation, with franchises taken back into public control as and when they reached the end of the term, leading to the prediction of a third of passenger franchises being publicly owned by the end of Corbyn's first full term, if he had won the general election which was at the time scheduled to be held in 2020, but was later brought forward to 2017.

== Evolution ==
=== Corbyn video ===
On 11 August 2016, Corbyn boarded the 11:00 VTEC service from London King's Cross to Newcastle, travelling to a leadership hustings event with Owen Smith in Gateshead. He was accompanied by a team that included his aide Emma Rees and his wife. At 11:30, Corbyn was filmed sitting on the floor of the train at the end of a carriage by a Corbyn supporting freelance filmmaker who was working with Corbyn, and volunteers for his campaign.

The story was originally submitted to BuzzFeed News, who rejected the article as its author had "attached a load of conditions around the words and he wanted it written his way", according to BuzzFeed UK editor-in-chief Janine Gibson. On 16 August, a 26-second clip of the footage with Corbyn delivering a monologue to camera was made public, appearing in a story for the online edition of The Guardian originally headlined "Corbyn joins seatless commuters on floor for three-hour train journey". In the monologue, Corbyn described the train as "ram-packed" and said that many passengers face the same problem "every day". He used the opportunity to call for more trains and to make the case for public ownership of the railways. Later, he said: "Is it fair that I should upgrade my ticket whilst others who might not be able to afford such a luxury should have to sit on the floor?" Subsequently, The Guardian acknowledged that the text originally submitted to the paper had been clear that Corbyn had later taken a seat, but that this detail had been removed in the editing process prior to publication. The headline on the piece was corrected accordingly, over a month later.

=== Virgin Trains response ===
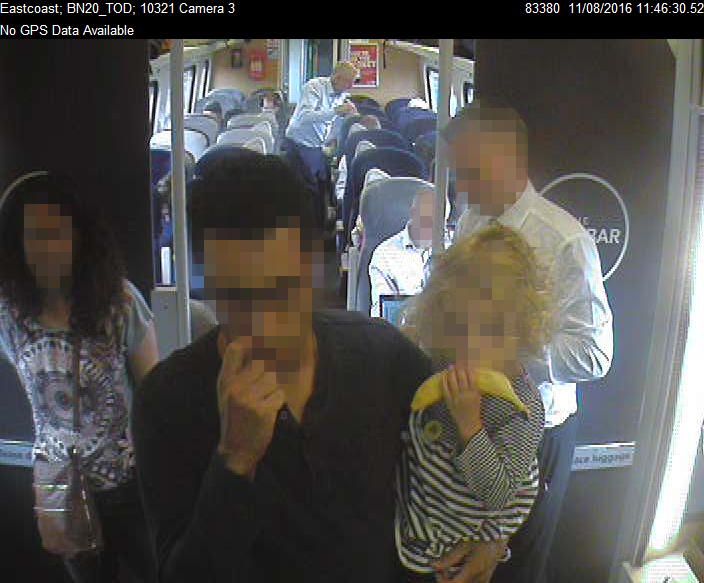
According to VTEC: "CCTV footage shows Mr Corbyn returning to Coach H and sitting down at 11:43, shortly after being filmed while sat on the floor and more than 2hrs before his final destination, Newcastle."

On 23 August 2016, Virgin Trains East Coast (VTEC) released a statement and CCTV footage from the train, which it said showed Corbyn walking past empty, unreserved seats in coach H prior to him being filmed on the floor, and then, with the assistance of the train crew, walking back to take a seat in Coach H, around 45 minutes into the journey. It also stated there were additional empty seats on the train, which appeared to have been reserved but not taken, and so therefore could have been used by Corbyn. Passengers are allowed to sit in reserved seats as soon as it becomes obvious they have not been taken up, and train conductors will tell passengers on a busy train to do this. The statement also thanked Corbyn for praising their staff, and highlighting the need for new trains, explaining "that's why we're introducing a brand new fleet of 65 Azuma trains from 2018." It also said the company would be delighted to work with ministers if they proposed changing the rather "blunt instrument" of fares regulation so that it allowed the operator more freedom to effectively manage demand during exceptionally busy periods, such as sporting events. The same day minority VTEC shareholder Richard Branson also tweeted an image of and link to the CCTV footage, with the message "Mr Corbyn & team walked past empty unreserved seats then filmed claim train was ‘ram-packed".

With Corbyn's account of events now being questioned, the incident began to be referred to as "Traingate" by media in the UK and abroad.

Subsequent responses from Virgin saw the company highlight its ongoing financial relationship with the Labour Party, offering deals to their annual party conference, and welcoming Corbyn on their service to Glasgow on 25 August (having reserved a seat this time). In response to media speculation that Virgin's response was timed to overshadow their long-term rival British Airways' flight returning Team GB from the Rio Olympics, sources at the company stated the delay was down to the need to review footage and establish a timeline of events.

Explaining VTEC's decision to respond to Corbyn's accusations with CCTV footage, Branson stated on 3 September that the company had known from its IT system that there were "something like a hundred and forty empty seats on the train".

=== Corbyn response ===
On 23 August, in response to VTEC's statement, Corbyn's office released a statement that Corbyn had been unable to find an unreserved seat, and had sat in the corridor with other passengers who were also "unable to find a seat". It added that it was only after a family received an upgrade to First Class, that Corbyn and his team were offered those vacated seats by a member of train staff. It also reasserted the claim that Corbyn's policy of bringing the trains back into public ownership was so popular was precisely because passengers across Britain will have been in similar situations on overcrowded, expensive, trains. Corbyn's aide Emma Rees also stated that what the CCTV did not necessarily show was that seats were being reserved by luggage or small children. The original filmmaker of Corbyn on the floor also claimed some of the empty seats appeared to be occupied due to the presence of bags and coats in contrast to the claims by Corbyn's aide.

On 24 August, when questioned about the incident at a press conference, Corbyn told reporters he was there to talk about his National Health Service policies, but then replied to the questioning saying, "I am very pleased that Richard Branson has been able to break off from his holiday to take this issue seriously and with the importance it obviously deserves. I hope he is very well aware of our policy, which is that train operating companies should become part of the public realm, not the private sector." He explained that "Yes, I did walk through the train. Yes, I did look for two empty seats together so I could sit down with my wife, to talk to her. That wasn't possible so I went to the end of the train.", adding that at first the train manager had offered to upgrade him to First Class, before allocating him some seats which he was able to take after 42 minutes.

Corbyn's campaign manager and TSSA union officer Samuel Tarry dismissed the row as a "spat", but asserted that VTEC's response showed that the establishment were "absolutely terrified" of Corbyn's "not particularly radical plans to renationalise". Tarry also stated in a radio interview that "The bigger story is that a tax exile of more than 10 years decides to lay into [Jeremy Corbyn] on social media in a very public way. Richard Branson is literally laughing all the way to the bank at the British taxpayers' expense. In the last year this chap has made some £53 million directly from the taxpayer."

=== Data Protection inquiry ===
In August 2016, the Information Commissioner's Office said that it would look into the release of CCTV footage on data protection grounds. A spokesperson said "All organisations have an obligation to comply with the Data Protection Act and must have legitimate grounds for processing the personal data they hold. Where there’s a suggestion that this hasn’t happened, the ICO has the power to investigate and can take enforcement action if necessary." In July 2017, the Information Commissioner's Office ruled that Virgin was allowed to correct Corbyn's accusations by publishing the video but "should have taken better care to obscure the faces of other people on the train".

== Reactions ==
=== Corbyn front bench ===
Writing in the Sunday Mirror on 28 August 2016, Corbyn's most senior ally, Shadow Chancellor John McDonnell, called for Branson to be stripped of his knighthood, describing him as a "tax exile who thinks he can try and intervene and undermine our democracy".

=== Owen Smith ===
On 24 August 2016, Owen Smith said Corbyn had a legitimate point about train overcrowding, but sided with Virgin Trains over the specific incident, stating "I think the evidence is there on the CCTV footage, obviously Jeremy did have a seat and went to sit on the floor in order to make a point about overcrowding." He also stated that he was not entirely sure what Corbyn's version of events was, as it had appeared to change a couple of times on 23 August. Responding to calls for Branson to lose his knighthood, he said "I can't imagine we'd strip somebody's honours for telling the truth." A 24 August tweet, "My campaign remains on track. Proud to be genuinely standing up for ordinary people." was interpreted as a reference to the row.

=== The Guardian ===
On 28 August 2016, The Guardian, citing leaked internal policy documents and emails, alleged Virgin Trains' release of CCTV footage was "in breach of the company’s own policies" and that "the managing director of Virgin Trains East Coast told staff that the controversy had highlighted how crowded services can be, and that finding seats could make customers anxious and stressed". Virgin declined to comment on the leaks, instead referring the newspaper to its earlier statement thanking Corbyn for highlighting how helpful their staff had been.

According to the Guardian's own analysis in the wake of the row, the East Coast route is relatively free of capacity issues compared to other franchises, with 80% of passengers rating it "satisfied or good" in terms of space to sit or stand, and that it has more issues with the train's other facilities, due to the length of the journey. By comparing the cost of new trains and the money paid on fares, it concluded that taking operators back into state control would not solve much in the grand scheme of things, with savings of hundreds of millions being unlikely to make a dent in costs of tens of billions, and so the answer instead lay in Corbyn finding some way to make taxpayers increase their contribution from the present £3.5 billion a year. It also concluded other avenues, such as cost savings, would also encounter difficulties, as it would require better employee relations (to avoid disputes such as the concurrent Southern strike) or Network Rail taking on more debt.

On 7 October 2016, The Guardian published a review of its own coverage of the incident by its readers' editor, Paul Chadwick, which concluded that the paper was to some extent responsible for the story generating the controversy that it did. Chadwick said that the paper should have made clearer at the time that the video and accompanying text had been submitted by a Corbyn supporter rather than as a piece of news reporting by an independent freelance journalist. It also acknowledged that although the original text had been clear that Corbyn had taken a seat later in the journey, this detail was omitted from the published version, and the headline had erroneously suggested that Corbyn had sat on the floor for the entire journey.

=== Social media ===
On Twitter, several people who said they were on the train came to Corbyn's defence, backing his account and sharing pictures of them sitting with him in the corridor. Others made the point that many trains are overcrowded, regardless of whether Corbyn's had been.

According to The Independent, reactions on Twitter elicited a "multitude of viewpoints" rather than just the usual pro or anti-Corbyn stances – distilling 28 perspectives, ranging from dismissal to conspiracy theorising, even pointing out that "ram-packed" is not a word (it is either "rammed" or "jam-packed").

=== Media analysis ===
Simon Calder, travel correspondent for The Independent, wrote that overcrowding on intercity routes (such as the one Corbyn was travelling on) is much less frequent than on commuter routes, and he argued that in fact the bigger problem for the East Coast franchise was too many empty seats on off-peak trains (making them inefficient) rather than too few.

According to The Independent, "as the traingate saga seemed to spiral out of control" and "while Twitter had a field day", aides were unable to contact Corbyn for a response to Virgin's claims because he was at home, making jam, making the situation worse in their opinion, as it resulted in confusion and doubt as various different explanations emerged from different team members about what had happened on the train – "whether there were bags or children on unreserved seats or whether he had just wanted to sit with his wife". It argued that this made it an incident which "fuels the impression that, at the most critical moments – such as during the referendum campaign – the Labour leader is absent".

The BBC postulated various reasons why Branson might have taken the "risky gambit" of making a public attack on a politician, and more than a week after the event, ranging from a desire to overshadow British Airways, an expected response given his long-standing record of reacting aggressively to attacks on his brand's reputation, or as a method of most effectively quashing the idea of renationalisation which "has an appeal to a wide range of voters", or because the franchise itself was under financial pressure and any lessening of profits would risk yet another default on this troubled route.

Noting its "oddly partisan" nature, Private Eye also questioned the neutrality of The Guardian's original story, based on research into their bylined Guardian video producer which showed they were a Corbyn supporter and had a working relationship with the freelance filmmaker, something they noted the paper did not disclose.

Citing various public relations professionals, PRWeek concluded that the row had caused damage to Corbyn, reinforcing impressions that he is not a capable operator when it comes to media management, made all the worse as it was self-inflicted, and that Virgin had done a good job protecting its reputation by acting decisively and across both traditional and social media in their response, and that ultimately they would still benefit from creating doubt about Corbyn's version of events, even if he was right.

=== Public opinion ===
A YouGov poll, on 24 August 2016, found that, of the 4,454 UK adults surveyed, 57% thought that Corbyn was being dishonest, compared with 18% who thought that he was not; 58% thought that the row did matter, compared with 19% who thought it did not. However, amongst current Labour voters, 39% believed him against 34% who did not.

Other YouGov polling data showed the row had impacted negatively on VTEC in terms of brand awareness, brand impression and perceptions of value for money among the general public, showing a negative score for the first time in brand impression, although this was balanced by no change when looking only at the views of current customers.

=== Labour leadership election ===
Polls showed that 11% of those eligible to vote in the leadership election said that the incident had improved their view of Corbyn, while 20% said that it had given them a more negative view. However, amongst Corbyn supporters, 18% said that it had given them a more positive view of him, against 5% who said that it had given them a more negative view. The Independent suggested that this was due to Corbyn being seen to make a stand against an unpopular operator.

== See also ==
- Train overcrowding in the United Kingdom
