= List of Bad Education characters =

Characters in British television sitcom

This article lists the characters and the actors who portray them from the BBC television series Bad Education and its 2015 film adaptation, The Bad Education Movie.

== Overview ==
Character	Portrayed by							
Character	Portrayed by	Series 1	Series 2	Series 3	Movie	Special	Series 4	Series 5
Staff
Alfred Prufrock "Alfie" Wickers	Jack Whitehall	Main	Main	Main	Main	Main		Guest
Shaquille Banter "Simon" Fraser	Mathew Horne	Main	Main	Main	Main	Main	Main	Main
Rosie Gulliver	Sarah Solemani	Main	Main	Main	Main	Main		
Miss Isobel Pickwell	Michelle Gomez	Main	Main					
Olive Mollinson	Leila Hoffman	Main					Guest	Guest
Martin Wickers	Harry Enfield		Main	Main	Main			
Professor Celia "Pro Green" Green	Samantha Spiro		Main					
Bernadette Hoburn	Vicki Pepperdine					Main	Main	Main
Pupils
Chantelle Parsons	Nikki Runeckles	Main	Main	Main	Main	Main		
Jing Hua	Kae Alexander	Main	Main	Main	Main			
Joe Poulter	Ethan Lawrence	Main	Main	Main	Main	Main		
Mitchell Harper	Charlie Wernham	Main	Main	Main	Main	Main	Main	Main
Leslie "Rem Dogg" Remmington	Jack Binstead	Main	Main	Main	Main	Main		
Stephen Carmichael	Layton Williams	Main	Main	Main	Main	Main	Main	Main
Frank Grayson	Jack Bence	Recurring	Recurring	Main	Main	Main		
Cleopatra Ofoedo	Weruche Opia			Main	Main	Guest		
Usma	Asha Hassan					Guest	Main	Main
Jinx	Laura Marcus					Guest	Main	Main
Blessing	Francesca Amewudah-Rivers					Guest	Main	Main
Inchez	Anthony J Abraham					Guest	Main	Main
Harrison	Bobby Johnson					Guest	Main	Main
Warren Griffiths	Ali Hadji-Heshmati					Guest	Main	Main
Other
Mrs. Carmichael	Hilary Whitehall	Guest	Guest	Guest	Guest		Guest	
Preet	Harry Peacock	Guest		Guest				
Richard	James Fleet			Recurring				
Kayleigh	Melanie Wilder						Guest	Recurring

== Staff ==
=== Alfie Wickers ===
Alfred Prufrock "Alfie" Wickers (born 17 June 1988, portrayed by Jack Whitehall, series 1–3, guest series 5) – Alfie is a 23-year-old History teacher at Abbey Grove School. He has difficulty managing and disciplining his students, some of whom treat him with contempt, and is often harassed by them. Regardless, he frequently recruits them to help save him from difficult situations. His classes are eccentric, using teaching techniques such as reenacting battles with costumes and classroom furniture and séances. Though he pretends in front of staff to respect school rules, he frequently lets his students break them and regularly breaks them himself. Alfie attended the posh Middleton House school, where he was bullied by pupils and staff, which he is still troubled by. Before coming to Abbey Grove, he worked at a B&Q store. Alfie has a crush on fellow teacher Rosie Gulliver, and spends a lot of time trying to impress her, frequently unsuccessfully. By the end of series 1, he had begun a relationship with her, but when series 2 began, the relationship had been over for some time. In the first episode of series 3, he and Rosie are cohabiting, but she moves out after he wrongly accuses her of cheating. He was disgusted when his father Martin Wickers (Enfield) started a relationship with his old flame and Abbey Grove's short-lived Deputy Head Professor Celia Green. Alfie later learnt that Martin and Celia were engaged. Though opposed to this at first, he later accepted it, since Celia makes his father happy. He briefly felt sorry for his father when the relationship ends, allowing his father to move in with him, and annoying Rosie. But this quickly turned into a rivalry when his father becomes the new Deputy Headmaster. He goes to work in a DIY shop for one week because he finds saying goodbye to graduating students too difficult. But he is persuaded by his students and Rosie to return to teaching. Alfie's mother lives in Spain with her partner Javier and their children. At the end of the reunion special, Alfie gets himself fired from Abbey Grove in order to join Rosie in teaching migrants in Lebanon.

=== Simon Fraser ===
Shaquille Banter "Simon" Fraser (portrayed by Mathew Horne) – Shaquille Fraser, usually referred to by his surname, is the headteacher of Abbey Grove in series 1 to 3. He is immature, irresponsible, and a woefully inadequate head. He thinks of himself as intelligent and enjoys wordplay and metaphor, though it embarrasses his staff frequently. On several occasions, he shows that he is bad at communicating with parents and is insensitive to religious and racial issues. He legally changed the spelling of his surname to "Fra$er", but it often appears on signs as "Fraser" or "Frazer". In the Bad Education Handbook, it is implied that he legally changed his middle name to "Banter", a word that he is obsessed with. In the series 1 finale, he undergoes a review by the educational board when a video of him accidentally showing a pornographic video to an exam full of students goes viral. He retains his job, but admits in series 3 that he is no longer allowed to supervise exams due to the aforementioned incident. In series 2, he is conned for all the school's remaining finances, meaning that they are forced to make 'swingeing' cuts. In series 3, it is revealed that he lost all of the money raised by investing in his own clothing range. As a result, one member of staff is going to be fired, but when Alfie resigns, he sells his flat so that Alfie could keep his job. He is continually undermined by his deputies and does not, with the exception of Martin, have a good relationship with them. In the final episode of the third series, he becomes inconsolable about Alfie leaving the school, hiding his upset behind childish insults. Unlike Alfie, he does not purposely put his students in danger and seems to care about them and the quality of the school. By the time of the special episode and fourth series, he works in the school canteen, having perceived it as a promotion from being head.

=== Isobel Pickwell ===
Isobel Pickwell (portrayed by Michelle Gomez, series 1–2) – Miss Pickwell is the Deputy Head at Abbey Grove. She is a strict disciplinarian. Alfie compares her to an SS Officer and makes fun of her fascist views. She is deeply conservative and religious, with contempt for what she believes are Rosie's attempts to turn the school into a "hippie commune". Her classroom and office are dark and bleak, with the only decorations being various pictures of dictatorial heads of state. She frequently schemes for more power, and nearly succeeds in unseating Fraser as headteacher in the final episode of series 1, until Jing proved that she had been defrauding the school in her expenses. In the same episode, she reveals that she has not cried since 1990 – "when [Thatcher] was hounded out of office by her own party." In series 2, upon learning of Rosie's lesbian relationship with Alex Scott, she secretly confesses to having previous lesbian relationships and attempted unsuccessfully to flirt with Rosie. In Funeral, Pickwell is believed to have died after committing suicide over the abuse received from Alfie's class, culminating in her being covered in glue whilst being distracted when answering a staged "phone a friend". In her suicide note, she directly blamed Alfie for her decision. However, she revealed to Alfie that she faked her death in order to escape debtors and to live with her penpal, a German dentist in his nineties known as The Beast of Bergandorf, who lives in Argentina. Pickwell returns for her last appearance in the final episode of series 2 and buys Alfie at a man auction for £25,000, more than enough to save Abbey Grove. She reveals she became a millionaire after she inherited her penpal's gold (which he had stashed in Switzerland), following his death the previous month.

=== Rosie Gulliver ===
Rosie Gulliver (portrayed by Sarah Solemani, series 1–3) – Rosie is the Biology teacher and former interim Deputy Headteacher at Abbey Grove School. She is openly bisexual and exceptionally takes pride when inspiring and teaching her students. She is passionate about charity work, animal rights, human rights, feminism, and the struggles of people with disabilities. When teachers were asked to do a sex education class, she is the only one who leads an honest discussion of human sexuality and shows acceptance and patience of the changes that the students were going through. When mistakenly believing Alfie was raped by a teacher at Middleton House when he attended it, she urges him to accept that he was a victim and speak for all those who have had their "voices silenced". In "Funeral", Fraser asks her to become interim Deputy Headteacher, and, to Alfie's alarm, begins to develop similarities to Pickwell's dictatorial style. Her tenure ended with the appointment of Professor Green in "Valentine's Day". At the beginning of series 1, she breaks up with her boyfriend Richard, stating she was too "physical" for him. At first, she finds Alfie callow and does not share his feelings for her, though over time she warms to him. At the school dance in the finale of series 1, she compares him to a student who really frustrates her, but has potential and is "perfect" after all, and kisses him in front of most of the student body. In the second series, however, Alfie is upset to learn that they are not together, and that she has formed a lesbian relationship with her former student, Alex Scott. In the fourth episode of the second series, this relationship comes to an end, and Rosie's feelings for Alfie return. She gets a job offer in Soweto in the final episode of series 2, but decides to decline it when Alfie declares his feelings for her, and she returns them. They share another kiss. By the beginning of series 3, they are living together, but she moves out after Alfie wrongly accuses her of cheating. She refuses to acknowledge the status of their relationship until "Prom", when the thought that Alfie will no longer be around shows her that she still cares deeply about him, and they get back together. In the reunion special, it is revealed that Rosie has been working in Lebanon for six months teaching migrants. At the end of the special, Alfie phones her to announce that he will be joining her there.

=== Pro Green ===
Professor Celia "Pro Green" Green (portrayed by Samantha Spiro, series 2) – Green is Pickwell's replacement as Deputy Head after Pickwell's faked death. It is quickly revealed that Fraser hired her because he thought she was the British rapper Professor Green, and she retains the nickname "Pro Green" in tribute. When she and Alfie first met, she came across as very friendly, but she is soon revealed to be as disciplinarian as Pickwell. She sleeps with Alfie's father, Martin, whom she went to teacher school with, when he invited her over to Alfie's apartment for a Valentine's Day dinner. She continues to act like a dictator, and continues her relationship with Martin, often tormenting Alfie with it. She becomes increasingly extremely obnoxious, pompous, sanctimonious and derisive, taunting other staff in insensitive ways. She also saw herself as a higher category of importance than anyone else, questioning why she should suffer for the school's 'profligacy', when she flaunted her own state of profligacy and ensured that she was the only person to benefit from the situation. In the series 2 finale, Martin and Green get engaged. She is absent from the Christmas special due to her and Martin being on their honeymoon, but by the first episode of series 3, she has left Martin and taken his money, causing Martin to live at first in his car, then alongside Alfie and Rosie.

=== Martin Wickers ===
Martin Wickers (portrayed by Harry Enfield, series 2–3) – Martin Wickers (né Stool) is Alfie's father. His wife left him for a Spanish man named Javier. Martin starts a relationship with Green, who went to teacher training with him, and in the series 2 finale, they get engaged. He was absent from the Christmas special due to him and Celia being on their honeymoon, but by the first episode of series 3, Celia and Martin had already married, and she had already left him, taking all his money. Martin has been living in his car and moves in with Alfie and Rosie. He is appointed the new deputy head at Abbey Grove. He begins a relationship with Frank Grayson's mother, implying that he plans to move in with and marry her. However, it appears that this relationship is over in "Exam" after her dog Coco appears to be unknowingly killed she was in Martin's care, but is later revealed to be alive.

=== Olive Mollinson ===
Olive Mollinson (portrayed by Leila Hoffman, series 1 and 4) – Olive is an Art teacher and Head of the Maths department at Abbey Grove. She is the oldest staff member, having worked at the school since at least the 1960s. She does not appear in series 2 and 3 but makes a guest appearance in the series 4 episode "Whodunnit", where she is shown to still be working at Abbey Grove, but is now a science teacher.

=== Bernadette Hoburn ===
Bernadette Hoburn (portrayed by Vicki Pepperdine, series 4) – Hoburn is the blunt, strict new headteacher of Abbey Grove who must contend with Stephen and Mitchell's antics.

== Pupils ==
=== Original series ===
- Chantelle Parsons (portrayed by Nikki Runeckles, series 1–3, Reunion) – Chantelle is a female pupil in Alfie's form. She is sexually suggestive, and it is implied that she is promiscuous. She teases Alfie and frequently attempts to seduce him. In "Valentine's Day", she had self-confidence issues, and wants Alfie to notice her, so she pretends to have fallen pregnant. She is jealous of Miss Gulliver due to her relationship with Alfie. In the reunion special, it is revealed that since leaving Abbey Grove, Chantelle had a daughter named Alfrida.
- Jing Hua (portrayed by Kae Alexander, series 1–3) – Jing is a Chinese pupil, who often speaks in her native language to insult Alfie (which he interprets as a compliment, a question about 'English culture,' or a correct answer to a question). The most intelligent and serious pupil in Class K, in series 1, she is constantly frustrated that Alfie hardly teaches them anything, but in series 2 she comes to Alfie's aid and comments that he is a "good and decent man". She helps Fraser keep his job by exposing Pickwell stealing money from the school. In series 3, she undergoes a personality change, becoming moody and nihilistic. In "Exam", she reveals that her attitude change is because of parental pressure. She sabotages her Biology GCSE exam to avoid being sent to the university that her parents want her to attend. In the series finale, she is believed to be the only person in the class who would stay in school to do their A levels, but she admits that she applied to a creative writing class in Paris. She convinces Alfie that he is a good teacher and that he should continue teaching.
- Joe Poulter (portrayed by Ethan Lawrence, series 1–3, Reunion) – Joe is Alfie's closest friend ally in the class who always calls him by his first name instead of Mr Wickers. He willingly humiliates himself to help Alfie, having falsely came out, pretended his mother had a life-threatening illness, and cooked for Alfie's father. He is the butt of jokes and pranks by other pupils, although they seem to have affection for him. In series 2, he had a bowl cut, and he begins series 3 with a shaved head. During series 3, he appeared to grow in confidence and intelligence. In the reunion special, it is revealed that since leaving Abbey Grove, Joe now works in a care home.
- Mitchell Carlsberg Harper (portrayed by Charlie Wernham) – Mitchell is the tough guy of Alfie's class, poking fun at fellow pupils and Alfie. However, Alfie would usually get his own back by poking fun at Mitchell's family life, commenting that he didn't know who his dad was and how he lived in a caravan. He had a friendship with Rem Dogg which sees them constantly making insulting comments about each other and their respective mothers. Alfie describes him as one of his favourite students in the Bad Education Handbook, and they develop a friendship during series 2. In series 3, they get along much better after Alfie successfully helps Mitchell impress Cleopatra, with whom Mitchell is infatuated. In the second episode of series 3, Mitchell leaves Abbey Grove after his father's fairground is shut down by the council. It is implied that he has moved and transferred to another school, but in "The Exam", Mitchell is shown in a youth detention centre. In the Reunion special, Mitchell is shown to be working as a delivery driver. He also reveals that he has a child on the way and becomes Abbey Grove's new P.E. teacher. He is known to have at least three siblings; a brother named Boddington and two sisters (the youngest of which is named Stella).
- Leslie "Rem Dogg" Remmington (portrayed by Jack Binstead, series 1–3, Reunion) – Rem Dogg is a pupil who uses a wheelchair and constantly wears a pair of headphones and baseball cap. He comes across as a cheeky chap who pokes fun at Alfie, and is very close friends with Mitchell. In series 3, he becomes an emo and rarely speaks, going some episodes without saying a word, which could often lead to him putting himself in compromising situations: in "Strike", he spends 24 hours chained to the school gates. He becomes emotional when Mitchell gives him an impassioned goodbye, but is called "gay" in response, as a reference to the nature of their friendship. In the reunion special, Rem Dogg is revealed to have become a bitcoin millionaire.
- Stephen Carmichael (portrayed by Layton Williams) – Stephen is a camp, gay member of the class. He comes out in Episode 2 of series 1 in order to aid Alfie's sex education class, to nobody's surprise. In "Prom", he ignores common advice and attends the prom in his drag queen persona. He has a passion for fashion, dancing, musicals and films. He is best friends with Chantelle. In the Christmas special, he begins a relationship with Frank Grayson. He appears not to get on with Frank in series 3, but Frank agrees to be his date for the prom and they are later crowned Prom King and Queen (due to Stephen attending the prom as his female alter-ego Stephanie Fierce). He stuns others by breaking homosexual stereotypes, including being good at football and advanced martial arts. In the Reunion special, it is revealed that Stephen has been working as the drama teacher at Abbey Grove.
- Frank Grayson (portrayed by Jack Bence, series 1–3, Reunion) – Frank Grayson, usually referred to by his surname only, is the school bully, who intimidates his fellow pupils as well as Alfie. On one occasion, he steals Alfie's shoes; on another, he forces Alfie to buy him and his friends cider. After Pickwell's departure, he is controlled by Green. At times, he appears to be insecure about himself, breaking down in Alfie's arms after Pickwell dies and exploring his sexuality in the Christmas special, culminating in a relationship with Stephen. In "Fundraising", it is revealed that Frank has been held back at school for so many years that he is the same age as Alfie. Martin moves him to Class K in order to avoid expelling him, which would have upset his new girlfriend, Grayson's mother, meaning that Alfie and Grayson could become step-brothers if they married. In "The Exam", Grayson and his mother move in with Alfie and Martin, despite Martin saying that he would move in with her. But this arrangement appears to be over by the next episode. In the same episode, he finally bonds with Alfie. In series 3, he appears no longer to get along with Stephen, but agrees to be his date to the prom and they are crowned Prom King and Queen. In the episode, Frank is mentioned to have a brother named Ben who hosted a warehouse rave Alfie planned to attend. It is revealed in the final episode that he has another brother named Dean who now works at Alfie's old B&Q workplace. In the reunion special, it is shown that since leaving Abbey Grove, Frank is now a Buddhist.
- Cleopatra Ofoedo (portrayed by Weruche Opia, series 3, Reunion) – Cleopatra is a pupil introduced at the start of series 3. She is aggressive and especially hostile to Alfie and Mitchell. She is black and sensitive to racial issues, frequently accusing others of racism. She agrees to make out with Mitchell, but still does not like him. After Mitchell leaves, she begins making jokes at Alfie's expense like Mitchell used to. Despite her hostility, she admits in the final episode that she likes Abbey Grove. She claims to have been to 12 schools, but plans to get kicked out and sent to a new one (even though she is no longer required by law to stay in school). In the reunion special, it is shown that since leaving Abbey Grove, Cleopatra is now a speaker for education and did a speech at the UN.

=== Revival ===
The reunion special introduces a new set of Class K pupils who are taught by Stephen and Mitchell.

- Usma (portrayed by Asha Hassan; reunion–present) – Usma is the glamorous, social media obsessed gossip of the class. She is shown to be very image-conscious and is extremely sassy and popular. She is partially based on how Stephen was portrayed in the original series and Layton Williams noted that he was consulted as part of the creation of the character.
- Blessing (portrayed by Francesca Amewudah-Rivers, reunion–present) – Blessing is a money-oriented member of the class who is always hustling and running scams which can sometimes get her into trouble with some of the teachers and other pupils. Charlie Wernham stated that Blessing is often Mitchell's sidekick during some of his own schemes.
- Inchez (portrayed by Anthony J Abraham; reunion–present) – Inchez is an aspiring rapper who tries to project a front that he is cool, though the rest of Class K don't seem to take him very seriously. In the series 4 episode "Prison", it is mentioned that Inchez's father is a Bishop.
- Harrison (portrayed by Bobby Johnson; reunion–present) – Harrison is a dim-witted but very loyal member of the class. Due to his lack of intelligence, Harrison is always willing to go along with whatever plans his friends or his teachers suggest.
- Warren (portrayed by Ali Hadji-Heshmati; reunion–present) – Warren is a smart, quiet member of the class who prefers to keep to himself. He is very conscientious and organized, meaning he often ends up having to neglect his studies in order to help in Stephen's latest efforts to become a star.
- Jemima (portrayed by Laura Marcus; reunion–present) – Jemima, usually referred to by her nickname of "Jinx", is a socially-conscious member of the class who appears to be completely unaware of her own privilege.

== Guest characters ==
=== Richard and Mrs Carmichael ===
Richard Carmichael (portrayed by Delroy Brown) and Mrs Carmichael (portrayed by Hillary Whitehall, mother of Jack Whitehall) are Stephen's father and mother. They want him to leave Abbey Grove, thinking it isn't the right school for him, but eventually agree to let him stay. Richard appears only in the episode "Drugs" whilst Mrs Carmicheal appears in "Sex Education", "Drugs", "Fundraiser", "Sports Day", "Whodunnit" and "Glow Up", the latter of which reveals that she works as a nurse. She also appears in "The Bad Education Movie".

=== India ===
India (portrayed by Phoebe Waller-Bridge) is a drug counsellor who came to talk about drugs at Abbey Grove but actually took drugs herself. Alfie develops a romantic interest in her, only for her to reject him after he unintentionally vomits on her after taking a bad reaction to his newly created drug "Dirty Viennetta".

=== Kevin Schwimer ===
Kevin Schwimer (portrayed by Kyle Soller) is employed as a new history and gym teacher in series 2, who claims to be American and had many wild experiences that impress Mr Fraser. His short tenure at the school ends after Alfie and Jing expose him as a fraud and that he is actually from Dudley.

=== Fergal Harper ===
Fergal Harper (portrayed by Sam Douglas) is Mitchell's father who works at a fun fair and rents out his stalls for Abbey Grove's fundraiser.

=== Alfie's Mum ===
Alfie's Mum (portrayed by Frances Barber) is Alfie's mother. She left Alfie's father Martin prior to the series and now lives in Spain with her new husband Javier and has children with him. She along Javier appear in the Christmas special where she was told by Fraser that Alfie was in a car crash so she would come to Abbey Grove's Christmas play.

=== Javier Garcia-Ramires ===
Javier Garcia-Ramires (portrayed by Jake Canuso) is the new husband of Alfie's mother. He appears in the Christmas special where he at first mistakes Rem Dogg for Alfie.

=== Bonehead ===
Bonehead (portrayed by Greg McHugh) is a homeless man who appears in the Christmas special. He was first seen at a soup kitchen Alfie and Rosie are volunteering at and later attends Abbey Grove's Christmas play.

=== Preet van der Plessis ===
Preet van der Plessis (portrayed by Harry Peacock) first appeared in "Self Defence" as a South African self-defense tutor hired to teach self-defense lessons at Abbey Grove. However, he was arrested for genuinely attacking Alfie and bringing dangerous weapons into the school. He later appeared in "Sports Day" where he is hired as the school's new P.E. teacher. Alfie strongly objected to his hiring due to the previous incident, and concern that Preet sought revenge against him. However, he asked Preet to train him to defeat Rosie's ex-boyfriend Richard in the "Parents vs Teacher" race. Just before the race, Preet cornered Alfie in the changing room and admitted that he hated Alfie for getting him put in jail. However, he realised that his aggression towards Alfie was out of frustration for not being able to express his romantic feelings for Alfie. During the aforementioned race, Preet tries to shoot Richard with a tranquiliser gun, but ends up accidentally shooting Alfie instead and is last seen being taken away by police. It is also implied during the same episode that he once murdered a woman. He is later mentioned by Fraser in the series 4 episode "Prison".

=== Katherine Grayson ===
Mrs Katherine Grayson (portrayed by Katherine Kingsley) is Frank's mother who appeared in "Fundraising" and "The Exam". She was very keen for her son to stay at Abbey Grove despite nearly every class not wanting him. At the end of the episode, she is revealed to be in a relationship with Alfie's father Martin. She has a pedigree chihuahua called Coco who she considers a princess, showing more affection towards Coco than Frank, whom she blames for causing her previous partner (Frank's father) to leave. She and Frank briefly live with Alfie and Martin for one episode, despite Martin saying that he was going to move in with her. This arrangement comes to an abrupt end when it appears that Cleo may have unknowingly killed Coco while she was in Martin's care (Coco is later shown to be unharmed in the post-credit clip). In the final episode of series 3, "Prom", it is revealed that she has another son named Dean who works at a DIY store that Alfie briefly worked in.

=== Coco ===
Coco who appeared in "The Exam" is Katherine Grayson's pedigree chihuahua who is considered a princess by her and receives more affection than Frank. It was believed that she was accidentally burned to death inside a handbag whilst she was in Martin's care. However, in the post-credits clip, it was later revealed that Coco was alive and had not been in the bag.

=== Richard ===
Richard (portrayed by James Fleet) is an ex-boyfriend of Rosie's who first appears in "After School Clubs". He, along with Rosie, attended the same reading club, which Alfie also briefly attended, where he thought that one of the other club's members, Orlando, was Rosie's ex-boyfriend but was surprised to learn it was Richard (owing to the age gap between him and Rosie). He later appeared in "Sports Day" where he took part in the "Parents vs Teacher" race. He did not appear after this, but is referred to often.

=== Dean Grayson ===
Dean Grayson (portrayed by Tom Davis) is Frank's older brother who works at a DIY store that Alfie also briefly worked in. It is also revealed that he also went to Abbey Grove and was taught by Rosie.
