= List of Bad Education episodes =

The following is a list of episodes of British television sitcom Bad Education, which was originally broadcast on BBC Three from 2012 to 2014, with the sitcom returning in 2022 for a reunion special, and then onwards from 2023, for a fourth series, and a fifth series, released in 2024.

== Series overview ==
| Series | Episodes | Originally released | | Average viewership (in millions) |
| Series | Episodes | First released | Last released | Average viewership (in millions) |
|---|---|---|---|---|
| 1 | 6 | 14 August 2012 | 18 September 2012 | 1.195 |
| 2 | 6 | 3 September 2013 | 8 October 2013 | 0.970 |
| 2 | Special | 17 December 2013 | | 0.970 |
| 3 | 6 | 16 September 2014 | 21 October 2014 | 0.854 |
| 4 | Special | 15 December 2022 | | —N/a |
| 4 | 6 | 15 January 2023 | 12 February 2023 | —N/a |
| 5 | Special | 13 December 2023 | | —N/a |
| 5 | 6 | 14 January 2024 | 28 January 2024 | —N/a |

== Episodes ==
=== Series 1 (2012) ===
| No. overall | No. in series | Title | Directed by | Written by | Original release date |
|---|---|---|---|---|---|
| 1 | 1 | "Parents' Evening" | Ben Gosling Fuller | Jack Whitehall | 14 August 2012 |
It is parents' evening at Abbey Grove School and Alfie Wickers is under pressure from Deputy Head Miss Pickwell to mark his mock exam papers, otherwise she will fail his whole class. He hears that Biology teacher Rosie Gulliver has split from her boyfriend, which distracts him as he becomes fixated with securing a date with her. Unpredictable headteacher Mr Fraser is also keen to make a move on Miss Gulliver, so Alfie resorts to backing her campaign for research into Palmer's syndrome by falsely claiming that Joe's mother Emma Poulter died of PS. His plan fails when Emma introduces herself and says that she does not have PS.
| 2 | 2 | "Sex Education" | Ben Gosling Fuller | Jack Whitehall | 21 August 2012 |
Abbey Grove School parents are worried about the impending arrival of French exchange students, after Jean Claude and his French classmates ran riot leaving a wake of lovestruck teenagers behind them the previous year. This year, Fraser is determined to prove to the angry parents that he has everything under control, especially with his right-hand man Alfie by his side. However, Alfie is not the right person to entrust with a sex education class. It turns out that Mr Fraser has mistakenly arranged an exchange with the town of Hoogeveen in the Netherlands. Alfie pressures Joe to pretend to falsely come out as gay in exchange to get Joe out of going to Hoogeveen on an exchange trip. A handsome, confident, talkative, popular Dutch pupil takes over the class. Afterwards, Joe admits to everyone about his and Alfie's deal, leading Alfie to admit to being a virgin. Parents wish for Alfie to be fired, but Fraser decides instead to have Alfie go on the exchange trip to Hoogeveen with the school bully Frank Grayson (who had been picked to replace Joe on the trip).
| 3 | 3 | "Self Defence" | Ben Gosling Fuller | Jack Whitehall and Freddy Syborn | 28 August 2012 |
A new computer game craze hits Abbey Grove School and many pupils are imitating a dangerous move called the 'blitz kick'. Mr Fraser decides to buy a copy of the game to see what all the fuss is about, but inadvertently turns his staff into addicts as well. Alfie decides to support Miss Gulliver in taking a stand against this violence by organising a weapons amnesty. Mr Fraser hires a very inappropriate self-defence instructor, Preet, who helps demonstrate the dangers of violence.
| 4 | 4 | "School Trip" | Ben Gosling Fuller | Jack Whitehall and Freddy Syborn | 4 September 2012 |
Banned by Fraser from organising his own trip after his previous outing with his class to watch The Human Centipede at a cinema, Alfie's class are sent on Miss Gulliver's field trip to a combined petting zoo and ink museum. Chantelle is upset after having been dumped by Finlay, a young man with whom she recently had sex. Alfie is upset to learn that Miss Gulliver has a blind date with a 23-year-old man later that day. She is upset by the way the animals are being kept, so Alfie releases a pig believing that it will impress Miss Gulliver. The coach driver becomes ill and Alfie drives it, but soon hits the pig, who was standing in the road. Alfie and Miss Gulliver take several pupils into the woods. Alfie eats poison berries which make him ill. He finds a car park where people are dogging. When Miss Gulliver's date arrives, Chantelle recognises him as Finlay and chases him off. Fraser takes a group of students to what he described as a poetry reading, but is actually a rap battle. He ends up losing his students, after being shown to win the battle. Miss Pickwell takes her group to an abattoir.
| 5 | 5 | "Football Match" | Ben Gosling Fuller | Dan Swimer and Shaun Pye | 11 September 2012 |
The annual football match between Abbey Grove and the school he attended, Middleton House (whose state of the art MacBook Pros went missing last year), approaches. Alfie is coaching after being recruited to that position by Fraser because the PE teacher is missing. Alfie knows virtually nothing about football, so the team quit owing to his incompetence. He therefore becomes the goalkeeper and enlists ten of his pupils to create a new team. The team play badly in the first half, but play better in the second half owing to Stephen joining the team. Alfie reveals his hidden ability for Irish dancing.
| 6 | 6 | "Politics" | Ben Gosling Fuller | Jack Whitehall and Freddy Syborn | 18 September 2012 |
Mitchell shows Alfie a video of an old man manipulating his scrotum to Sledgehammer. Alfie sends it to Fraser, who inadvertently shows it on a projector to a class who are sitting a mock exam. With the school elections due to take place (with the leaders being Grayson, acting as a Tory and brain box David Millbank), Miss Pickwell is determined to show the governors that she can run something successfully, in her attempt to become the long-term replacement of Fraser as headteacher. Alfie is keen to show Miss Gulliver he can take politics seriously and enlists Joe to be his candidate. The episode mimics the 2010 Labour Party Leadership Election and the Blair-Brown deal. Miss Gulliver is angry that Pickwell wants to pull up the memorial garden which Gulliver made in memory of her brother Freddie in order to use the space to park in.

=== Series 2 (2013) ===
| No. overall | No. in series | Title | Directed by | Written by | Original release date |
|---|---|---|---|---|---|
| 7 | 1 | "Swimming Gala" | Elliot Hegarty | Jack Whitehall and Freddy Syborn | 3 September 2013 |
Abbey Grove's new term kicks off with the annual swimming gala and headmaster Fraser decides to pay homage to the fact the UK recently hosted Splash!, by ending it with a synchronised diving competition. Alfie and his class do not usually take part in the gala, but lured by a cash bet with Pickwell he decides to bribe them with a group trip to Nando's and enter the event (despite his severe chlorine allergy). The first day back is also a chance for Alfie to catch up with Gulliver – whom he wrongly believes to have become his girlfriend. However, he is shocked to find out that he is not in a relationship with her. He is even more shocked – as well as aroused – to find out that she is in a lesbian relationship with Alex, one of her former pupils.
| 8 | 2 | "The American" | Elliot Hegarty | Jack Whitehall and Freddy Syborn | 10 September 2013 |
Alfie is shocked by the arrival of new American teacher Kevin Schwimer (Kyle Soller) at Abbey Grove and even more shocked to learn that he is taking over Alfie's class. Desperately upset that his class seem to be having a great time and actually learning proper, real-life GCSE History with their new teacher, Alfie is even more unhappy when he finds out that Pickwell has given him a notorious second-year class. With Fraser and Gulliver increasingly charmed by Mr Schwimer, Alfie and Jing uncover the truth about him. They discover that he has fabricated many achievements and is actually from Dudley.
| 9 | 3 | "Funeral" | Elliot Hegarty | Jack Whitehall and Freddy Syborn | 17 September 2013 |
Alfie leads his class in a prank against Pickwell. She goes missing and her car is found on the Severn Bridge by the police. He finds a suicide note from her in the staffroom, in which she says she jumped from the Severn Bridge and blames him. Haunted by guilt, he tries to put her unquiet spirit at rest with a memorial service. With Pickwell gone, Fraser recruits Gulliver as interim deputy head. He advertises on Gumtree for a new deputy head, but none of the applicants are successful, so he offers Gulliver the position. Pickwell surprises Alfie, telling him she faked her death and is intending to claim on her life insurance and live with a nonagenarian German dentist in Argentina.
| 10 | 4 | "Valentine's Day" | Elliot Hegarty | Jack Whitehall and Freddy Syborn | 24 September 2013 |
It is Valentine's Day, so Fraser has planned an Abbey Grove Take Me Out to help the shy kids find love, but new deputy headmistress Professor Celia Green puts a stop to it. She is very unpopular with the pupils and teachers – apart from Alfie's father Martin, who is attracted to her and was at teacher-training college with her. Alfie is desperately trying to persuade Gulliver so that she will want to have dinner with him. Alfie and Martin have dinner; Alfie brings Joe and invites Gulliver, while Martin invites Professor Green. Alfie is pleased when Gulliver arrives and tells him that she has split up with Alex, but horrified when Martin and Green have sex in Alfie's bedroom. Chantelle tells Alfie that she is pregnant, but later admits that she falsely claimed to be pregnant in order to gain his attention.
| 11 | 5 | "Drugs" | Elliot Hegarty | Freddy Syborn and Jack Whitehall | 1 October 2013 |
Fraser has organised guest speaker India (Phoebe Waller-Bridge) for Drugs Awareness Day, which Gulliver objects to. Alfie is attracted to India, but she rejects him in reaction to him vomiting on her. Alfie's class is alarmed by the news that Stephen's parents want him to leave Abbey Grove, but after visiting the school they change their minds.
| 12 | 6 | "Fundraiser" | Elliot Hegarty | Freddy Syborn and Jack Whitehall | 8 October 2013 |
Abbey Grove is plunged into financial ruin when Mr Fraser gives the "Nigerian Minister of Finance" all their money with the false promise of huge returns on the investment. With Pro Green executing an austerity drive which sees the school pillaged of resources, Rosie thinks it is time to move on and applies for a job for a school in Soweto. Green enlists Alfie to teach biology, and tells him to call her Mummy. Martin and Green tell Alfie that they are going to marry. Alfie suggests to Fraser that they organise a fundraiser. He agrees, and they hire equipment from Mitchell's father, who runs a funfair. Gulliver decides to auction the teachers; a mystery bidder pays £25,000 for Alfie. Gulliver kisses Alfie, before Alfie finds out that the benefactor is Pickwell, whom he leaves with. She tells him that she inherited a lot of gold from her German friend who died last month.
Special
| 13 | — | "Christmas" | Elliot Hegarty | Jack Whitehall and Freddy Syborn | 17 December 2013 |
It is time for the Abbey Grove Christmas play and with Miss Pickwell no longer around Fraser decides Alfie is the obvious replacement to direct this year's production. But with the class undecided about whether to put on The Nutcracker or RoboCop, will Alfie's decision to write and direct a plot mash up of Robocracker and casting school bully Grayson as co-star prove successful?

=== Series 3 (2014) ===
| No. overall | No. in series | Title | Directed by | Written by | Original release date |
|---|---|---|---|---|---|
| 14 | 1 | "Strike" | Al Campbell | Freddy Syborn and Jack Whitehall | 16 September 2014 |
It is summer term and Alfie is back to get his class through their exams. Martin married Pro Green, but she left him, taking his money. He now lives in his car, so Alfie allows him to move in with him and Miss Gulliver, who are now cohabiting. There is a shock for Alfie with the revelation that Martin has been appointed as the new deputy head. Martin's first jobs are to increase class sizes and fire a member of staff after Mr Fraser has badly invested the school's money in his own clothing range, Dolce and GaBanter. For Alfie this means a new pupil, Cleopatra, and a tough decision to make – stand by Miss Gulliver when she leads the teachers on strike, or sacrifice himself to save his class from failing their exams.
| 15 | 2 | "After School Clubs" | Al Campbell | Freddy Syborn and Jack Whitehall | 23 September 2014 |
Mitchell announces he is leaving Abbey Grove, but there is the perfect opportunity for a farewell party when Fraser decides to rent out rooms in the school to after-school clubs for extra cash. However, things get complicated for Alfie when he promises to attend Gulliver's book group, Fraser's LARPing club and Mitchell's leaving party. Alfie wants to use the book group as an opportunity to impress Miss Gulliver, but when he gets his class to write the chapter summaries things quickly go from bad to worse. Simultaneously, he has to help Fraser win a fantasy battle against two very self-important LARPers and survive Mitchell's leaving pranks.
| 16 | 3 | "Sports Day" | Al Campbell | Freddy Syborn and Jack Whitehall | 30 September 2014 |
It is Abbey Grove's sports day and Mr Fraser has hired the most inappropriate new sports teacher to oversee events – Preet. Alfie is horrified at Preet's return after he served a prison sentence for assaulting Alfie. Alfie sees this as a good opportunity to challenge Richard (James Fleet) – Miss Gulliver's much older friend who wants to become her friend with benefits – to an assault course, which Preet designs. Jing wrote a false report in the school newspaper of there being a drug cheat competing. Alfie finds Richard's tablets, assumes they are anabolic steroids, and takes several of them, only later to discover that they are actually viagra tablets. Alfie gains an erection during the race, and narrowly wins.
| 17 | 4 | "Fundraising" | Al Campbell | Dan Swimer and Jack Whitehall | 7 October 2014 |
Martin's attempts to teach Alfie to drive end in disaster when they run over Pod, the school caretaker. Alfie and his class start fundraising for Pod's urgent surgery. However, when Grayson is transferred to Alfie's class (to appease his mother who objected to him being permanently excluded, having been held back for 5 years) it soon becomes clear that their noble intentions might be difficult with him around. Soon Alfie and his class find themselves no longer leading a charitable enterprise, but being taken on a joyride in a stolen ambulance. While Alfie is giving a tracheotomy after being mistaken for a paramedic, his class spot Pod walking around instead of being in a wheelchair. Fraser has taken up pole dancing and sees the fundraiser as the perfect opportunity to demonstrate his skills. Meanwhile Alfie ends up sexting Martin by mistake after Miss Gulliver's phone is swapped with his, and Alfie tries to find out if she is having sex with Richard.
| 18 | 5 | "The Exam" | Al Campbell | Freddy Syborn and Jack Whitehall | 14 October 2014 |
Fraser discovers that Alfie never passed his Biology GCSE, so Alfie must go back to school himself to be taught by Miss Gulliver and sit the exam with his own class. It should be the perfect opportunity to prove to her that he can motivate his class and lead by example, but Alfie decides there is only one real option: cheating. But, with the revelation that the notorious ball-breaking invigilator Mr Hewston will be overseeing the exam, it becomes clear that this is going to be a battle of wits. Meanwhile Martin is babysitting his girlfriend's dog and Mr Fraser is organising the end-of-exam skip party.
| 19 | 6 | "Prom" | Al Campbell | Freddy Syborn and Jack Whitehall | 21 October 2014 |
With exams over it is careers advice day for Form K, but it is Alfie who makes the biggest decision of all when he realises he does not want to go on teaching without his beloved class and quits Abbey Grove. Mr Fraser is devastated to lose his best friend and takes the news badly. Alfie says he has landed himself a job at the PlayStation factory, even though in reality it is at DIY Home Stores, and cannot be tempted back despite Miss Gulliver and his class begging him to return. Miss Gulliver tries unsuccessfully to cheer up the class by being a cooler teacher. Meanwhile the school prom takes place and the prom king and queen are crowned. Alfie gives a final emotional goodbye to his class.

=== Series 4 (2023) ===
All episodes of Series 4 were made available on BBC iPlayer on 15 January 2023 but aired weekly on BBC Three.

| No. overall | No. in series | Title | Directed by | Written by | Original release date |
|---|---|---|---|---|---|
Special
| 20 | — | "Reunion" | Freddy Syborn | Freddy Syborn and Jack Whitehall | 15 December 2022 |
It’s near the end of term at Abbey Grove, and Alfie is prepping for a careers presentation – really just an excuse to reunite all the old Class K and have a big party. Meanwhile, Stephen has been teaching at Abbey Grove for six months, but none of his old school friends know this. He has been maintaining the fiction that he is now a musical theatre star on the rise and tells his pupils (the new Class K) that they cannot blow his cover.
Series
| 21 | 1 | "Rivals" | Freddy Syborn | Nathan Byron | 15 January 2023 |
It’s a new day at Abbey Grove, and as usual, Mitchell and Stephen are totally neglecting their teaching duties. To save money, Hoburn tells them that she is going to have to get rid of one of their departments unless they can prove the educational merits of their subjects. After failing to sabotage each other, Class K convince Mitchell and Stephen to work together and they successfully set up the maths teacher and save their jobs. Meanwhile Fraser is panicking as he has accidentally sent the entire internet to the printer in alphabetical order and struggles to hide his error from Hoburn, who is on the warpath over wastage.
| 22 | 2 | "Whodunnit" | Freddy Syborn | Layton Williams and Rhys Taylor | 22 January 2023 |
When Stephen's plans to take Class K to a Drag brunch in order to ingratiate himself with the community and become more famous but his scheme is thwarted when Hoburn, who is already stressed about the impending Ofsted inspection, receives an anonymous tip-off. Stephen asks for Mitchell's help and they interrogate the pupils in order to find who is responsible. Their efforts are unsuccessful and Stephen discovers that the culprit is Mitchell, who had done it because he did not want the pupils to fail their mock exams. When his staff call in sick, Fraser hires Task Rabbit but problems arise when Hoburn mistakes him for the inspector. Mitchell makes amends with Stephen by bringing Bianca Del Rio to the school, inadvertently rectifying the damage caused by Hoburn and Fraser, as the inspector turns out to be a huge fan.
| 23 | 3 | "Prison" | Freddy Syborn | Laura Smyth | 29 January 2023 |
Fearing she is losing control of the school, Hoburn tries begins implementing stricter measures, including taking the phones of students and teachers. In an effort to be taken more seriously, Mitchell encourages Hoburn to try a prison experience programme to teach the pupils discipline. Class K's protests cause them to end up incarcerated with Stephen, who’s prepping an audition as a hardened criminal. Warren enjoys his newfound power when the others discover he still has his phone. Mitchell and Stephen realize that the prison officers are secretly criminals and team up with Fraser to punish them. Class K escape their incarceration when Harrison reveals that he has been using the fire exit to leave all day but didn't think to tell anyone. The pupils convince Hoburn that their behaviour is now under control, enabling Mitchell to keep his job.
| 24 | 4 | "Trailblazer" | Freddy Syborn | Priya Hall, Leila Navabi and Laura Smyth | 5 February 2023 |
Mitchell struggles with the realities of living on a teacher's salary when trying to afford a pram for his son and teams up with Blessing in a takeaway-smuggling scheme to make more money. Fraser seeks advice from Warren in order to un-cancel himself after exhibiting problematic behaviour during the school's Caribbean week. After Class K make Stephen feel old and irrelevant on his 27th birthday, he goes to ridiculous lengths to prove he is still a trailblazer by impressing the elite Class A and their business teacher. After failing to make waves by challenging the questionable canteen practices and outdated library books, he protests Hoburn's unethical school trip, causing problems when a student's nut allergy causes a medical emergency.
| 25 | 5 | "Glow Up" | Freddy Syborn | Ciaran Bartlett | 12 February 2023 |
Stephen is desperate to get rid of Mitchell, who has moved in after his girlfriend kicks him out, so he, Fraser and Class K team up to give Mitchell a Fab Five-style glow up in the hope she’ll take him back, which he reluctantly agrees to. Usma attempts to pass her English course by getting a story published in the school paper. When Warren expresses skepticism, Usma makes a bet with him that, if she can submit an article by the end of the day, she becomes the new editor of the paper and, if she can't, Warren gets control of her Instagram. When Blessing becomes suspicious that Hoburn is a member of the Illuminati, the Class discover that she secretly writes erotic fiction about Mitchell. After abandoning Stephen's ridiculous plan, Class K are able to convince Mitchell's girlfriend to give him a second chance.
| 26 | 6 | "School Play" | Freddy Syborn | Freddy Syborn and Felix Hagan | 19 February 2023 |
Stephen aims to turn the school play into a showcase for his acting talents in order to impress an agent. When Hoburn invites the school Governors to the play, knowing it will be offensive and problematic, Mitchell suspects she is up to something and discovers that she plans to get the school closed down in order to receive a large severance package. When Stephen injures himself, the agent calls an ambulance and Hoborn sabotages Mitchell's attempts to stall for time by tricking Harrison and altering the cue cards. Inchez reluctantly agrees to go on and play Meghan Markle in the second act, despite his Dad being in the audience. Hoburn cuts the power as the paramedics arrive and is confronted by Stephen, while Mitchell and Class K convince the governors that the chaos was all part of a plan to support the NHS, saving the school. Both new teachers end up on the way to hospital after Mitchell falls off the stage and Stephen is distraught when the talent agent asks him to pass her information to Mitchell.

=== Series 5 (2024) ===
All episodes of Series 5 were made available on BBC iPlayer on 14 January 2024 but aired weekly in double-bills on BBC Three.

| No. overall | No. in series | Title | Directed by | Written by | Original release date |
|---|---|---|---|---|---|
Special
| 27 | — | "A Christmas Carol" | Freddy Syborn | Freddy Syborn | 13 December 2023 |
With the help of ghostly friends past, present and future, Stephen makes an important decision about his career at Abbey Grove. Mitchell takes his Die Hard obsession to the limit.
Series
| 28 | 1 | "Boxing" | Freddy Syborn | Freddy Syborn & Charlie Wernham | 14 January 2024 |
After spending their life savings on a wedding venue mix-up, Mitchell risks losing Kayleigh. Class K come to the rescue, promoting a boxing match at Abbey Grove with dramatic consequences for Warren.
| 29 | 2 | "Face-Off" | Freddy Syborn | Rhys Taylor & Layton Williams | 14 January 2024 |
When Mitchell gets a bit part in a gangster film, it goes to his head. Swayed by the hype, Hoburn instructs him and Stephen to swap jobs – but with the school drama competition looming, Class K aren't keen on the changes.
| 30 | 3 | "Fitness" | Freddy Syborn | Nathan Bryon | 21 January 2024 |
Hoburn enlists fitness guru Mo Dix to get the school back in shape. While Class K protest under Mo's regime, Stephen falls for him, going to great lengths to get rid of Mitchell so Mo can replace him as the new PE teacher.
| 31 | 4 | "Haunted House" | Freddy Syborn | Anna Costello | 21 January 2024 |
The recovery of Stephen and Mitchell’s old time capsule prompts an overnight break-in and some ghostly encounters and revelations for Class K. Hoburn is desperate to keep the identity of the new art teacher a secret.
| 32 | 5 | "Reading" | Freddy Syborn | Ava Pickett | 28 January 2024 |
When Jinx abandons her studies to spend more time with Mitchell, Class K struggle with their exam prep and ask Fraser to help, leading to an unusual interpretation of Pygmalion – involving an actual pig.
| 33 | 6 | "Camping" | Freddy Syborn | Laura Smyth | 28 January 2024 |
Class K's camping trip spirals into chaos after Mitchell takes his pranks a step too far. Stephen goes missing when he encounters an old drama school rival. Warren reveals he has a secret crush on someone.

== Film ==
| Title | Directed by | Written by | Release date |
|---|---|---|---|
| The Bad Education Movie | Elliot Hegarty | Freddy Syborn and Jack Whitehall | August 21, 2015 |
Alfie Wickers and class K go to Cornwall, but accidentally get involved with Cornish Liberation Army, a terrorist organisation fighting for Cornish independence.

== Ratings ==
Episode ratings from BARB.

=== Series 1 ===
| Episode no. | Airdate | Viewers | BBC Three weekly ranking | Multichannel rank | BBC iPlayer requests | Source |
|---|---|---|---|---|---|---|
| 1 | 14 August 2012 | 986,000 | 5 | 10 | 779,000 | |
| 2 | 21 August 2012 | 1,119,000 | 2 | 9 | 884,000 | |
| 3 | 28 August 2012 | 1,048,000 | 2 | 6 | —N/a | —N/a |
| 4 | 4 September 2012 | 993,000 | 3 | 6 | 882,000 | |
| 5 | 11 September 2012 | 931,000 | 2 | 8 | 924,000 | |
| 6 | 18 September 2012 | 745,000 | 5 | 22 | 880,000 | |

=== Series 2 ===
| Episode no. | Airdate | Viewers | BBC Three weekly ranking | Multichannel rank | BBC iPlayer requests | Source |
|---|---|---|---|---|---|---|
| 1 | 3 September 2013 | 975,000 | 3 | 4 | 1,532,000 | |
| 2 | 10 September 2013 | 1,096,000 | 2 | 5 | 2,133,000 | |
| 3 | 17 September 2013 | 953,000 | 2 | 6 | 1,822,000 | |
| 4 | 24 September 2013 | 927,000 | 3 | 7 | 1,709,000 | |
| 5 | 1 October 2013 | 1,076,000 | 2 | 7 | 1,528,000 | |
| 6 | 8 October 2013 | 961,000 | 3 | 9 | 1,926,000 | |
| Special | 17 December 2013 | 800,000 | 11 | 28 | 1,201,000 | |

=== Series 3 ===
| Episode no. | Airdate | Viewers | BBC Three weekly ranking | Multichannel rank | BBC iPlayer requests | Source |
|---|---|---|---|---|---|---|
| 1 | 16 September 2014 | 1,004,000 | 2 | 10 | 1,245,000 | |
| 2 | 23 September 2014 | 886,000 | 2 | 12 | 1,019,000 | |
| 3 | 30 September 2014 | 826,000 | 3 | 16 | 1,293,000 | |
| 4 | 7 October 2014 | 754,000 | 2 | 17 | 1,237,000 | |
| 5 | 14 October 2014 | 847,000 | 2 | 17 | 1,254,000 | |
| 6 | 21 October 2014 | 806,000 | 3 | 12 | —N/a | —N/a |
