= Plume School =

Plume Academy

Location
- Fambridge Road; Maldon, Essex, CM9 6AB; England; 51.7295°N 0.6766°E

Information
- Type: Academy
- Established: 1970; 56 years ago
- Founder: Thomas Plume
- Local authority: Essex
- Department for Education URN: 137790 Tables
- Ofsted: Reports
- Chair of Trustees: Paul Nagle
- Head teacher: Tom Baster
- Gender: Mixed
- Age: 11 to 18
- Enrolment: Approx. 1,760 (January 2015)
- Capacity: Approx 1800
- Website: www.plume.essex.sch.uk

Plume Academy is a secondary school with academy status located in the town of Maldon, Essex, England. The school is split over two separate campuses. Mill Road houses Years 7 and 8, Fambridge Road Years 9, 10 and 11 and the Sixth Form.

== History ==
The Plume School was formed in 1970 as a new comprehensive to educate the children previously at Maldon Grammar School, then in Fambridge Road, and Maldon County Secondary School, in Mill Road, a secondary modern. The Plume School's first term began in September 1970. The Maldon Grammar School had been founded in 1608 by Ralph Breeder, a haberdasher and linen draper who was an alderman of the town's corporation. He left £300 in his will "for the maintenance of a schoolmaster to teach a grammar school within the town".

The new school created in 1970 bears the name of Thomas Plume who, on his death in 1704, bequeathed his library of 7,000 books to the town of Maldon, now housed at the Thomas Plume Library, and money for a schoolmaster and librarian to look after the collection. A history of the schools states that "The Plume School in its modern form was established as a comprehensive in 1970 and merged with the Maldon County Secondary School located at the current site."

== Performance ==
Plume School is rated "good" in all four Ofsted categories (achievement of pupils, quality of teaching, behaviour and safety of pupils and leadership and management) of its most recent inspection.

== Notable former pupils ==
- Ethan Lawrence, actor (Bad Education, After Life)
- Sam Jeffries (rugby union, born 1993)

== See also ==
- Thomas Plume
- List of schools in Essex
- Maldon, Essex
