= Thomas Plume =

English churchman and bibliophile (1630–1704)

Thomas Plume (1630 – 20 November 1704) was an English churchman and philanthropist, and founder of a library in Maldon, Essex which still exists. The Plume School in Maldon is named after him.

Portrait of Thomas Plume

== Family life ==
The Plume family settled in the county of Essex at Great Yeldham. Thomas Plume was baptised in All Saints' Church, Maldon on 18 August 1630, as Thomas, son of Thomas and Hellen Plume. One John Plume had been the tenant of the Manor under John de Vere, 16th Earl of Oxford, during the reign of Henry VIII. Plume was educated at Chelmsford, Essex, and Christ's College, Cambridge. He became a Bachelor of Arts (BA) and a Doctor of Divinity (DD).

In 1658 he was appointed Vicar of East Greenwich, Kent, in 1662 Rector of Merston, Sussex, and in 1665 Rector of Little Easton, Essex. From 1679 until his death, unmarried, on 20 November 1704, Thomas Plume was Archdeacon of Rochester, Kent. He was buried at Longfield, Kent.

At the time of the Restoration in 1660 Plume was Vicar of Greenwich. He subscribed the declaration under the Act of Uniformity 1662, although his father at Maldon had been a prominent Presbyterian. Thomas was admitted Vicar of Greenwich at the age of 28, on 22 September 1658. He remained in this role for the next 46 years. He was the first chairman of the governors of The John Roan School in Greenwich.

== Plume Library ==
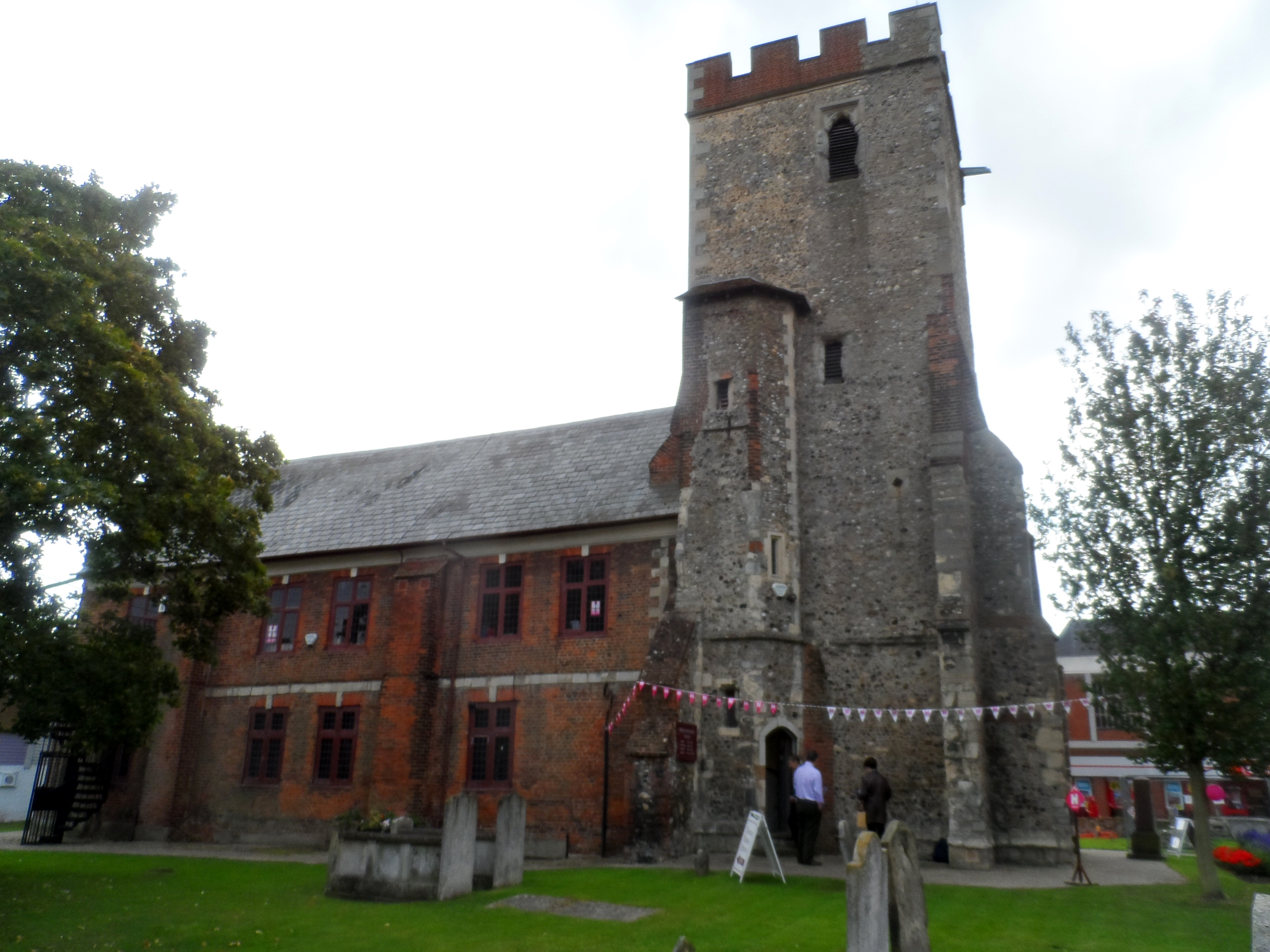
The Plume Building, Maldon

Although Plume spent most of his life in the Church, he was aware of intellectual changes taking place in other academic fields. He collected books which show his interests in other subjects: chemistry, astronomy, medicine, history and travel. Among this collection the following can be found:

- John Speed's atlas of 1631;
- Francis Drake's The World Encompassed, 1628;
- Robert Boyle's The Sceptical Chymist, 1680.

Even though he lived in Greenwich most of his life, Plume left his collection of over 8,000 books and pamphlets, printed between 1487 and his death, to his home town of Maldon. It was kept in St Peter's Church, of which only the original west tower survives; the rest of the building was rebuilt by Plume to house his library. The library was to be "for the use of the minister and clergy of the neighbouring parishes who generally make this town their place of residence on account of the unwholesomeness of the air in the vicinity of their churches". Plume left specific instruction for the use of the library: "any Gentleman or Scholar who desires, may go into it, and make use of any book there or borrow it, in case he leaves a vadimonium [a pledge or surety] with the Keeper for the restoring thereof fair and uncorrupted within a short time". Plume's library continues to grow after his death with contributions from others. An online catalogue of Plume's collection was completed in 2009 and can be consulted via the Library's website.

The Plume Library is no longer a lending library, though books may be consulted in situ. In 1989 it was determined that 723 books of the original bequest were missing; the Friends of the Plume Library have endeavoured to replace the missing volumes, and have purchased over 160 such texts.

The building is Grade I listed. The former church tower is of the late 14th century. The library building is of c.1699 with the addition of two bays at east end in 1821. It was restored by Ewan Christian in 1875. The new building was built of red brick with stone dressings, coved cornices and slate roof. On the first floor of the library, there are original 17th-century fittings including wooden panelling. Historic England awarded a grant of £67,962 for repairs in February 2021.

== Plumian Professor of Astronomy and Experimental Philosophy ==
In 1704 Thomas Plume founded the chair of Plumian Professor of Astronomy and Experimental Philosophy at the University of Cambridge in order to "erect an Observatory and to maintain a studious and learned Professor of Astronomy and Experimental Philosophy, and to buy him and his successors utensils and instruments quadrants telescopes etc".

== Legacy ==
Plume was unmarried, and left the considerable wealth he had acquired mainly for charitable objects. The sums of £1,000, £700, and £202 12s. 6d. he devoted to the foundation of a chair at Cambridge, bequeathing the money to William Covell, Master of Christ's; Richard Bentley, master of Trinity; Francis Thompson, of Caius; and William Whiston, Lucasian professor, to "erect an observatory and to maintain a professor of astronomy and experimental philosophy, and to buy or build a house with or near the same."

== Sources ==
- H. R. French, ‘Plume, Thomas (bap. 1630, d. 1704)’, Oxford Dictionary of National Biography, Oxford University Press, 2004, accessed 10 Sept 2006
- E. A. Fitch, 'Thomas Plume, D.D', Chelmsfordian, John Dutton, 1898
- I. Finton, 'The Book of Maldon',Barracuda Books Ltd., Bucks, England, 1986
- R. A. Doe & C. C. Thornton, 'Dr Thomas Plume, 1630–1704. His life and legacies in Essex, Kent and Cambridge', University of Hertfordshire Press, 2020
