= Rick Warden =

English actor

- Born: Richard George Warden; 29 September 1971 (age 54); Amersham, Buckinghamshire England
- Education: Churchill College, Cambridge
- Years active: 1995–present

Richard George Warden (born 29 September 1971) is an English actor.

Warden was born in Amersham, Buckinghamshire, he studied at Dr Challoner's Grammar School and received a B.A. honours in history at Churchill College, Cambridge, 1994. He married actress Lucy Barker on 1 May 2004.

He is probably best known for his appearances in the HBO miniseries Band of Brothers as 1st Lt. Harry Welsh, the BBC docudrama Dunkirk as Major Phillip Newman RAMC, the HBO/BBC Two historical drama, Rome, as Quintus Valerius Pompey and Channel 4's period drama Indian Summers as Ronnie Keane. He also appeared in Evol (2006) (with his wife) and in the film adaptation of Bravo Two Zero. He performed in the BBC serial production, Apparitions, as the character Michael, who is possessed by a demon. He played Mike Taylor, a police inspector, in the crime drama Happy Valley.

He also appears in The Chemical Brothers' 1999 music video "Hey Boy Hey Girl" and New Order's 2001 music video "60 Miles an Hour" as well.

In 2019, Warden appeared in the BBC One medical drama series Casualty as Ciaran Coulson. He reprised his role in 2021. In 2023, he appeared as Oliver Saxby QC in The Sixth Commandment.

== Filmography ==
=== Film ===
Year	Title	Role	Notes
1995	Loved Up	Cocker	Television film
1996	Different for Girls	PC Ken	
1996	In Your Dreams	Guy	Television film
1996	Holed	Nick	Television film
1998	Killing Time	Smithy	
1999	Bravo Two Zero	Tony Benotti	Television film
1999	Underground	Furball	Television film
1999	The Routine	Paul	Short film
2000	Honest	Baz	
2000	County Kilburn	Johno	
2001	The Last Minute	Jimmy Wilkinds	
2003	Lucky Jim	Mr. Catchpole	Television film
2004	Passer By	Dealer	Television film
2004	Three Rules of Infidelity	Liam	Short film
2004	Bride and Prejudice	Neighbour	
2005	Dominion: Prequel to the Exorcist	Corporal Williams	
2005	Mowing the Lawn	Neil	Short film
2005	Beneath the Skin	Max	Television film
2005	Imagine Me & You	Gordon	
2006	Evol	Boy	Short film
2006	Renaissance	Pierre Amiel	English version; voice only
2006	How Henri Came To Stay	Uriel	
2006	Rabbit Fever	Airline pilot	
2008	Doomsday	Chandler	
2008	Good	Brownshirt	
2009	Mr. Right	Alex's Brother	
2013	Fire Horse	Derek	Short film
2015	Pleasure Island	Connor	
2017	The Pact	Steve	Television film
2018	Genesis	Dr. Albert Smith	
2019	Hellboy	Dr. Edwin Carp	
2019	Making Friends	Darren	Short film
2020	The Reckoning	Rev Malcolm	
2021	Twist	Auctioneer	
2022	Death on the Nile	Monsieur Blondin	
2023	Unwelcome	Redcap Chief	

=== Television ===
Key
†	Denotes television productions that have not yet been released

Year	Title	Role	Notes
1997	An Unsuitable Job for a Woman	Davie	Episode: "Sacrifice"
1997–1998	Harry Enfield & Chums		Recurring role; 2 episodes
1998	The Bill	Michael Haslam	Episode: "Section F"
1998	The Ruth Rendell Mysteries	William Newton	Episode: "Going Wrong"
1999	Joan of Arc	English Chaplain	Miniseries; 1 episode
1999	Jesus	Jared	Miniseries; 2 episodes
2000	Dalziel and Pascoe	Midge	Episode: "Cunning Old Fox"
2001	Band of Brothers	Harry F. Welsh	Recurring role; 8 episodes
2002	Shackleton	John Vincent	Miniseries; 1 episode
2002	Doctor Zhivago	Liberius	Miniseries; 2 episodes
2003	Trust	Graham Hollick	Episode: "Episode 3"
2004	Wire in the Blood	Gary Weller	Episode: "Still She Cries"
2004	Dunkirk	Major Philip Newman	Miniseries; 3 episodes
2004	Swiss Toni		Episode: "Listening"
2004	The Bill	Gerard Love	Episode: "Friendly Fire: Part 1"
2004	Murder Prevention	Andrew Ainsworth	Episode: "False Prophet"
2005	Murder Investigation Team	Michael Brown	Episode: "Professional"
2005	Hustle	Paul Hopkins	Episode: "The Lesson"
2005–2007	Rome	Quintus Pompey	Recurring role; 5 episodes
2006	No Angels	Bob	Recurring role; 3 episodes
2006	Coming Up	Courier	Episode: "A Paradise Adventure"
2006	When Evil Calls	Mr. Dale	Recurring role; 2 episodes
2007	Trial & Retribution	Eric James	Episode: "Mirror Image: Part 1"
2007, 2008	HolbyBlue	Vinnie Dwyer	Recurring role; 2 episodes
2008	Primeval	Peter Campbell	Episode: "Catfight"
2008	Bonekickers	Kevin	Episode: "Follow the Gleam"
2008	Apparitions	Michael/Astaruth	Miniseries; 6 episodes
2010	Holby City	Toby Geddes	Recurring role; 3 episodes
2012	Case Sensitive	Geoff Linton	Episode: "The Other Half Lives: Part 1"
2012	Misfits	Mike	Episode: "Series 4, Episode 3"
2014	Sherlock	Bonfire Dad	Episode: "The Empty Hearse"
2014	DCI Banks	Mark Campbell	Episode: "Wednesday's Child"
2014	Inspector George Gently	Dennis Morden	Episode: "Gently Going Under"
2014, 2017	Uncle	Tom	Recurring role; 2 episodes
2014–2023	Happy Valley	Mike Taylor	Series regular; 14 episodes
2015	Capital	Eric	Miniseries; 1 episode
2015–2016	Indian Summers	Ronnie Keane	Series regular; 20 episodes
2016	The Investigator: A British Crime Story	Russell Causley	Recurring role; 4 episodes
2017	Fearless	Charlie Simms	Miniseries; 5 episodes
2019–2021	Casualty	Ciaran Coulson	Recurring role; 11 episodes
2021	The Beast Must Die	Leo	Episode: "Episode 1"
2022	Vera	Declan Webley	Episode: "Tyger Tyger"
2022	Rules of the Game	Dave Dixon	Miniseries; 2 episodes
2022	Trigger Point	Andy Phelan	Recurring role; 2 episodes
2022	Industry	Bob Snr	Episode: "Kitchen Season"
2022	A Spy Among Friends	Arthur S. Martin	Miniseries; 3 episodes
2023	The Sixth Commandment	Oliver Saxby	Miniseries; 1 episode
2024	Red Eye	Dr. Chris Peele	Miniseries; 3 episodes
2024	The Jetty	Martin Roberts	3 episodes
2024	Sister Boniface Mysteries	Douglas Wiseman	Episode: "Professor Y"
2026	Number 10 †		Upcoming series
