= John Bowe (actor) =

British actor

- Born: 1 February 1950 (age 76); Greasby, Wirral, Cheshire, England
- Occupation: Actor
- Children: 6, including Joseph Kennedy

John Bowe (born John Wilson, 1 February 1950) is an English actor best known for his roles in Emmerdale as Lawrence White and Coronation Street as Duggie Ferguson.

== Early life and career ==
Bowe was born in Greasby, on the Wirral in Cheshire, England. His highest profile role was probably that of George Marlow in the first Prime Suspect serial in 1991. He also played Duggie Ferguson in Coronation Street from 1999 to 2002, having previously appeared in another of Granada TV's soap operas, Families.

Other TV credits include: Warship, Secret Army, Boon, The New Statesman, Capital City, Class Act, Lovejoy, Silent Witness, The Royal, Dalziel and Pascoe, Cleopatra and Einstein and Eddington, Tipping the Velvet, The Hour and DCI Banks and Soldier Soldier. Film credits include The Living Daylights (1987), Resurrected (1989), County Kilburn (2000), and Gozo (2015).

In 2007, Bowe played Dr. Morgan in the BBC series Cranford.

In 2009, he played Ralph Jarvis in episode 4 series 2 of Ashes to Ashes.

In April 2010, Bowe joined the cast of London's West End production Priscilla, Queen of the Desert – The Musical, playing the part of Bob.

In September 2011, he appeared as Judge Turpin in Sweeney Todd: The Demon Barber of Fleet Street at Chichester, a role he continued in the West End transfer in 2012.

In September 2014, Bowe joined the cast of Emmerdale, playing Lawrence White, the former lover of Harold Birch, the husband of Edna Birch (Shirley Stelfox). He arrived with his daughter Chrissie (Louise Marwood), his grandson Lachlan (Thomas Atkinson), and Chrissie's fiancé, Robert Sugden (Ryan Hawley), whom he openly despised. Bowe's departure from Emmerdale was announced in April 2017, however, he did not leave until January 2018, when his character was killed off in a car accident.

During the COVID-19 pandemic, Bowe initially supported UK government measures. In April 2020, he reported contracting COVID-19 and "nearly dying" of the disease. However, over time, Bowe started objecting to the ongoing restrictions.

== Personal life ==
Bowe has been married three times. His son from his first marriage is fellow actor Joseph Kennedy. His third marriage is to actress Emma Bowe, daughter of Michael N. Harbour and sister of Kate Harbour.

== Filmography ==
- The Living Daylights (1987) - Colonel Feyador
- Resurrected (1989) - Colonel
- Prime Suspect (1991) - George Marlow (series 1)
- Coronation Street (1999–2002, soap opera) - Duggie Ferguson
- County Kilburn (2000) - Black Jack
- Heartbeat (1997 & 2006) - Ronnie Harper and Henry Stoddard
- The Bill (2008) - Tom
- Ashes to Ashes (2009) - Ralph
- Silent Witness (Series 13, Episode 6, "Run", 2009) - D.I. Barry Neill
- New Tricks (2011) - Alan King
- Casualty Series 28, Episode 35 "Carrot not Stick" (2014) - Stanley Hogg
- Emmerdale (2014–2018, soap opera) - Lawrence White
- Gozo (2015) - Johnno
- Safe and Effective: A Second Opinion (2022) - Narrator.
