= County Kilburn =

2000 film

County Kilburn is a 2000 British comedy film directed by Elliot Hegarty and starring Ciarán McMenamin, Rick Warden and John Bowe.

== Plot ==
A young man takes a job working at The Waggon and Horses, an Irish bar in Kilburn in North London, where a number of eccentric patrons do their drinking.

== Cast ==
- Ciarán McMenamin ... Mickey
- Rick Warden ... Johno
- John Bowe ... Black Jack
- Georgia Mackenzie ... Sue
- Patrick Duggan ... Dean
- Kay D'Arcy ... Torvill
- Norman Rodway ... Mr. Bollox
- Simon Sherlock ... Billy
- Tony Bluto ... Basic
- James Duggan ... Barry
- Les Doherty ... Priest
- Ryan Pope ... Builder
- Paul O'Grady ... Himself
