= Trying Again =

British TV sitcom (Sky Living, 2014)

- Genre: Sitcom
- Created by: Simon Blackwell; Chris Addison
- Written by: Simon Blackwell; Tony Roche
- Directed by: Ian Fitzgibbon
- Starring: Jo Joyner; Chris Addison
- Composers: Richie Webb; Matt Katz
- Country of origin: United Kingdom
- Original language: English
- No. of series: 1
- No. of episodes: 8

Production
- Producer: Caroline Norris
- Running time: 30 mins (inc. adverts)
- Production company: Avalon Television

Original release
- Network: Sky Living
- Release: 24 April – 5 June 2014

Trying Again is a British comedy television series shown on the Sky Living channel in 2014.

On 17 October 2014, the channel announced that the show will not be returning for a second series.

== Plot ==
The show revolves around a couple, Meg and Matt, who are working to have their relationship recover following Meg's affair with her boss. Six months after the affair, the couple are struggling to get their love life back on track. Highlighting friendships and love and all the problems those things bring, Trying Again focusses on a relationship between people who make mistakes but live in the hope that love will conquer all.

== Cast ==
- Jo Joyner as Meg
- Chris Addison as Matt
- Charles Edwards as Iain, Meg's boss
- Elizabeth Berrington as Gail, Matt's sister
- Alun Cochrane as Sam, Matt's friend and co-worker
- Alex MacQueen as Martin, Meg's co-worker
- Catherine Steadman as Kate, Iain's Girlfriend
- Katherine Jakeways as Paula, couples therapist
- Ethan Lawrence as Ryan

== Episodes ==
No.	Title	Directed by	Written by	Original release date	Viewers
1	"Episode 1.1"	Ian Fitzgibbon	Simon Blackwell	24 April 2014	303,000
Money is tight for Meg and Matt. To help alleviate the pressure, Meg is encouraged to apply for her old job as a doctor's receptionist, the one she left after her affair. Despite Meg's strong reluctance, she eventually takes up the job.
2	"Episode 1.2"	Ian Fitzgibbon	Simon Blackwell	24 April 2014	242,000
Meg and her sister Gail team up to ruin the sale of the house Meg and Matt have been renting.
3	"Episode 1.3"	Ian Fitzgibbon	Tony Roche, Simon Blackwell	1 May 2014	233,000
Meg and Matt are running out of time to find a new house, but also really need a break from routine.
4	"Episode 1.4"	Ian Fitzgibbon	Simon Blackwell	8 May 2014	246,000
Matt and Meg race back to Kendal from their romantic break, to secure their perfect house. However a squabble over money leads to a time-consuming trip to A&E. They arrive just too late, as the letting agent breaks it to them that he just gave the house away to another couple. But after some quick thinking from Meg, things take an unexpected turn, and they manage to secure the house of their dreams. Contented, Matt, Meg, along with Gail and Sam, head to the pub to celebrate, but Gail spots Iain enjoying a drink with his new, younger girlfriend, Kate. Meg admits to Gail and later Paula that she's just a tiny bit jealous.
5	"Episode 1.5"	Ian Fitzgibbon	Tony Roche	15 May 2014	195,000
Matt and Meg throw a housewarming dinner, and invite Iain and his girlfriend Kate along in an attempt to draw a line under Meg's affair, but a series of mishaps threaten to ruin the evening.
6	"Episode 1.6"	Ian Fitzgibbon	Simon Blackwell	22 May 2014	162,000
Meg is alarmed by Iain's plans to propose to Kate and frets about her and Matt's secrets coming out during Martin's date with their relationship counsellor.
7	"Episode 1.7"	Ian Fitzgibbon	Simon Blackwell	29 May 2014	188,000
Everyone gets dolled up for Iain and Kate's engagement bash, where Meg is mistaken for Iain's fiancée. As Matt basks in the adoration poured on him by Andrew's friends, the arrival of a genuine soldier threatens to unravel his tall tale.
8	"Episode 1.8"	Ian Fitzgibbon	Simon Blackwell	5 June 2014	137,000
Relationships and jobs are on the line in the series finale. Everyone rallies around Iain when he suffers a bereavement, especially Matt, who wants to make sure Meg's efforts to help him through this difficult time don't reignite their old flame.

== DVD ==
No DVD has been released yet.
