= Elliot Hegarty =

Film and television director

- Born: 5 June 1971 (age 55); London, England
- Education: University of Nottingham; New York University Film School; London Film School
- Occupations: Director, writer and producer
- Years active: 1994–present
- Known for: Star Stories, Bad Education, The Middle, Ted Lasso, Cheaters and Rivals
- Notable work: County Kilburn; The Bad Education Movie; Ted Lasso; Rivals

Elliot Hegarty is an Emmy award-winning film and television director working in Britain and the United States.

== Career ==
Hegarty graduated in Politics from Nottingham University in 1993 before studying at NYU Film School and the London Film School. He began his career writing and directing short-form productions before moving into television comedy. His first feature film was County Kilburn (2000), which he directed and wrote. He subsequently established himself as a television director, working on programmes including Star Stories, The Kevin Bishop Show, Moving Wallpaper, FM and Bad Education. Star Stories won Best New Comedy at the British Comedy Awards, while Hegarty received further recognition for his work in British television comedy.

During the late 2000s and 2010s, Hegarty expanded his career into American television, directing 21 episodes of the ABC sitcom The Middle and episodes of Mr. Sunshine, Suburgatory, Family Tools, Trophy Wife, Super Fun Night, Mixology, Selfie, Black-ish and The Real O'Neals. His British television credits during this period included Great Night Out, Lovesick, Loaded and Bad Education, alongside television films such as Grandpa's Great Escape, The Midnight Gang and Cinderella: After Ever After. In 2015, he directed The Bad Education Movie, a feature-film adaptation of the television series Bad Education.

Hegarty later directed episodes of the Apple TV+ series Ted Lasso, as well as Cheaters for the BBC and Trying for Apple TV+. He subsequently expanded into executive production. In 2024, he served as lead director and executive producer on the first series of Rivals, directing its first four episodes, and returned in both roles for the second series. He also served as lead director and executive producer on the first block of the Sky and Working Title Films series Charmer, directing three episodes.

Alongside his film and television work, Hegarty has directed commercials. His early advertising work included the Club 18–30 campaign, which received several industry awards, including a Bronze Lion at the Cannes Lions International Festival of Creativity. He has subsequently directed campaigns for companies including Guinness, KFC, Toyota, Hyundai, Npower, Enterprise Rent-A-Car, MFI and The Daily Telegraph.

== Filmography ==
=== Film ===
Year	Title	Notes
2000	County Kilburn	Director and writer
2015	The Bad Education Movie	Director

=== Television ===
Year	Title	Notes
2006–2007	Star Stories	Director; pilot and series 1–2
2007	Roman's Empire	Director; 6 episodes
2007	Notes from the Underbelly	Director; 1 episode
2008	The Kevin Bishop Show	Director; pilot and series 1
2008	Moving Wallpaper	Director; series 2
2009	FM	Director; pilot and series 1
2009	Pulling	Director; pilot
2010	Lizzie & Sarah	Director; television film
2010	Mr. Sunshine	Director; 1 episode
2010–2017	The Middle	Director; 21 episodes
2012–2013	Suburgatory	Director; 5 episodes
2013	Bad Education	Director; series 2 and Christmas special
2013	Family Tools	Director; 1 episode
2013	Trophy Wife	Director; 1 episode
2013	Super Fun Night	Director; 1 episode
2013	Great Night Out	Lead director
2014	Mixology	Director; 1 episode
2014	Selfie	Director
2014	Black-ish	Director
2014–2016	Lovesick	Director; 7 episodes
2016	The Real O'Neals	Director; 2 episodes
2016	BBC Comedy Feeds	Director; 1 episode
2017	Loaded	Director; 3 episodes
2017	Grandpa's Great Escape	Director; television film
2018	The Midnight Gang	Director; television film
2018	Urban Myths	Director; The Trial of Joan Collins
2019	Cinderella: After Ever After	Director; television film
2020	Ted Lasso	Director; 2 episodes
2022	Cheaters	Director; short-form series
2022	Trying	Director; 4 episodes
2024	Cheaters	Lead director; series 2, all episodes
2024	Rivals	Lead director and executive producer; directed episodes 1–4
2025–2026	Rivals	Lead director and executive producer; series 2
2026	Charmer	Lead director and executive producer; first block, 3 episodes

=== Other ===
Year	Title	Type	Notes
1994	Archie and Stafford	Short film	Writer
2000	Club 18–30	Advertising campaign	Director; directed the first three advertisements of the campaign
2000–present	Various campaigns	Commercials	Director; clients have included Guinness, MFI, KFC, Toyota, Npower, Enterprise, Hyundai and the Daily Telegraph
2006	National Television Awards: Jack & Kelly Backstage Exclusive	Television special	Writer
2006	National Television Awards: Jack & Kelly on the Red Carpet	Television special	Writer
