= The Bad Education Movie =

2015 British comedy film

- Theatrical release poster
- Directed by: Elliot Hegarty
- Written by: Freddy Syborn; Jack Whitehall
- Based on: Characters by Jack Whitehall
- Produced by: Pippa Brown; Ben Cavey
- Starring: Jack Whitehall; Harry Enfield; Mathew Horne; Sarah Solemani; Joanna Scanlan; Clarke Peters; Jeremy Irvine; Iain Glen
- Cinematography: Pete Rowe
- Edited by: Peter Oliver
- Music by: Vince Pope
- Production companies: Cave Bear Productions; Tiger Aspect Productions
- Distributed by: Entertainment Film Distributors
- Release date: 21 August 2015
- Running time: 91 minutes
- Country: United Kingdom
- Language: English
- Box office: $3.1 million

The Bad Education Movie is a 2015 British comedy film directed by Elliot Hegarty and written by Freddy Syborn and Jack Whitehall. The film is based on Whitehall's sitcom of the same name, and follows a similar plot-line, with young teacher Alfie Wickers' (Jack Whitehall) ineptly trying to supervise and occasionally educate Form K.

Filming for The Bad Education Movie took place over five weeks in Cornwall and Pembrokeshire, commencing 23 February 2015. The film was theatrically released in the United Kingdom on 21 August 2015 by Entertainment Film Distributors.

== Plot ==
Alfie Wickers has taken Class K on a school trip to Amsterdam. Unbeknownst to him, Mitchell has spiked his crepe with magic mushrooms, causing Alfie to hallucinate while in the Anne Frank Museum - Filmed in Mawnan Smith's Glendurgan Garden's adjacent estate, "Glendurgan House", in Cornwall. He believes Jing is a panda and is convinced that the Anne Frank dummy is alive, which leads to him stealing it from the museum (in a parody of E.T.) and ends up in a canal. A cut scene, whilst in the Anne Frank Museum, depicts Anne Frank pointing at Alfie before saying “home”.

One year later, set during the events of series 3, Alfie plans to take his class to Las Vegas, angering the parent–teacher association, who doubt the educational value of the trip. They demand that Alfie be sacked. Deputy Head and Alfie's father Martin Wickers, headteacher Shaquille Fraser and teacher and Alfie's girlfriend Rosie Gulliver insist that Alfie is given another chance and that they conduct a surprise visit to his classroom. Meanwhile, Mitchell has been attempting to tattoo 'Class K Forever' onto Alfie's back, but Alfie passes out from pain before Mitchell can get any further than the letters 'CLA'. The classroom visit ends with the children's parents refusing to pay for the Las Vegas trip, after Susan, the overbearing mother of Class K student Joe interrupted their "class wars" and accidentally shot the class hamster under her skirt. Alfie says he will pay for the trip, but upon realising the cost of this, decides on a trip to Cornwall. Joe is concerned his mother will not let him go on the trip, but Alfie creates a fake trip itinerary to fool the parents into thinking the trip is educational. Alfie also informs his class that his best friend from school, Atticus Hoye, is hosting a house party in Cornwall.

Susan, concerned about what the trip will involve, comes with the group to Cornwall, and implements Alfie's fake itinerary, starting with a trip to the Eden Project. While at the Eden Project, Alfie is forced to zip wire across the entire park with his trousers around his ankles and no underwear on. Also Mitchell picks a plant known as 'nature's laxative' which Alfie spikes Susan's drink with. The class continue to Penleven Castle where they see John the Baptist's foreskin. Susan, beginning to feel the effects of the laxative, goes to the toilet and leaves the group unattended. While she is away, Mitchell attempts to steal the foreskin, but loses it instead. Alfie retrieves it, but is unable to put it back before Susan returns. Alfie is forced to eat the foreskin to cover his tracks.

The group then arrives at the fishing town of Port Jago, where their hotel is located. Alfie and the children manage to sneak out to the local pub without being caught by Susan. At the pub, the barman and Pasco Trevelyan are discussing the Cornish Liberation Army, a terrorist organisation fighting for Cornish independence, which they are both members of. Alfie and the class arrive at the pub, where Alfie is mistaken for a CLA member because of the unfinished tattoo on his back. Pasco has a plan to assassinate the local Tory MP, Michael Hoye, who is also Atticus' father. Overhearing Alfie talking to Joe about going to the party at Atticus' house, Pasco reveals himself to be a smuggler and recruits Alfie to the CLA. Alfie and the class become involved in the frivolities at the pub, which get out of hand and end up with Joe being stabbed in the hand. Susan records the incident from outside through a window, but before she can send the recording to the other parents, Pasco (at Alfie's request) slips her some sleeping pills, packs her in a trunk, and abandons the trunk in Cherbourg, France. Pasco then takes the group to a strip club, where he asks Alfie to deliver some cannabis to Atticus Hoye's party the following evening on his behalf. Unbeknownst to Alfie, the truck he is to deliver the cannabis in is actually packed full of explosives. Meanwhile, Susan hitches a lift back to the UK from France with some illegal immigrants.

Back at school, the other teachers have lost contact with the Cornwall trip since Susan went missing. Martin, Fraser, and Rosie drive down to Cornwall in an attempt to find them. Alfie and the children arrive at the party, where Alfie is bullied by his so-called friends and made to teabag a swan. Feeling betrayed by everyone, including his class, he decides to call Pasco to be picked up from the party. Pasco takes this as a signal and detonates the truck, which blows up in the grounds of the Hoye house. Pasco drives Alfie and the children in his truck back to Port Jago and decides to make Alfie the leader of the Cornish rebellion. They are joined by many of the people from the pub and Port Jago itself, who all reveal themselves to be members of the CLA. Meanwhile, the other teachers, trying to find Alfie, have involved the police, who believe the situation to be so serious they call in Interpol, who in turn conclude that Alfie has been radicalised. They are joined at the operation's nerve centre by Susan and some other parents.

Pasco informs the group that the CLA is going to seize the means of production, which in Cornwall's case is its most important tourist attraction. The police believe this to be the Eden Project, and send troops there, but it soon transpires that the group are actually heading to Penleven Castle again (thanks to Susan placing a tracking chip in Joe's neck prior to the film). Alfie sabotages the rebellion, but expresses sympathy for Pasco's cause. Pasco turns violent and imprisons them. While the children escape thanks to a secret passage Joe finds in the castle which leads down to the beach, Alfie is forced into a sword fight with Pasco. Rosie and Fraser arrive in a helicopter and pull Alfie to safety, with Pasco being arrested.

Six weeks later, Michael Hoye has resigned as MP of Port Jago; and on results day, Mitchell again mixes magic mushrooms in some brownies which he gives to Alfie. Alfie once again loses his senses and hallucinates, before posing for an unusual 'Leavers Photograph'.

== Cast ==
- Jack Whitehall as Alfie Wickers
- Ethan Lawrence as Joe Poulter
- Charlie Wernham as Mitchell Harper
- Kae Alexander as Jing Hua
- Layton Williams as Stephen Carmichael
- Nikki Runeckles as Chantelle Parsons
- Weruche Opia as Cleopatra Ofoedo
- Jack Binstead as Leslie "Rem Dogg" Remmington
- Iain Glen as Pasco Trevelyan
- Joanna Scanlan as Susan Poulter
- Sarah Solemani as Rosie Gulliver
- Mathew Horne as Shaquille Fraser
- Harry Enfield as Martin Wickers
- Clarke Peters as Commander Andrews
- Jeremy Irvine as Atticus Hoye
- Talulah Riley as Phoebe
- Bruce Mackinnon as Grant Dodd
- Steve Speirs as Don the barman
- David Gant as Mick
- Sheila Reid as Margot
- Hilary Whitehall as Mrs Carmichael
- Marc Wootton as Officer Geoffrey
- Steve Oram as Officer Rowe
- Tony Maudsley as Yo Ho Ho Barman
- Tom Davis as Big Tom

== Production ==
Principal photography for The Bad Education Movie took place over five weeks, commencing 23 February 2015. The scenes featuring Penvelen Castle were filmed in Pembroke Castle in Pembrokeshire, Wales.

== Release ==
The film was theatrically released in the United Kingdom on 21 August 2015 by Entertainment Film Distributors. The film's first trailer was released on 12 July 2015.

== Reception ==
On Rotten Tomatoes the film has an approval rating of 63% based on 8 reviews.

Chris Tilly of IGN movies, wrote that "Hegarty directs in a style that transcends the show's small-screen roots, and ultimately there are enough good jokes to make the feature a worthwhile endeavour", awarding it 6.6/10. Henry Fitzherbert of the Daily Express, wrote "there are enough laughs to make this a hit with the target audience" and Fionnuala Halligan of Screen International described the film as "unexpectedly hilarious".

Negative reviews came from Matthew Turner of The List, writing "there's very little of any merit here, unless you're a Whitehall completist interested in seeing prosthetic recreations of his balls on multiple occasions" and Mike McCahill of the Guardian, writing "you sense Whitehall and co-writer Freddy Syborn egging one another on to see who can scrape the bottom of the barrel quickest and loudest". Guy Lodge, of Variety, stated "[it is] more extravagantly daft than a half-hour episode would permit, giving some peppy purpose to an otherwise low-rent cash-in."

British film critic Mark Kermode disliked the film, criticising its overuse of crude humour and portrayal of Cornwall and the Cornish people and saying that "after the first half an hour the [...] catastrophic level of boredom became so much that you just ceased to be bothered by it".
