= Layton Williams =

British actor (born 1994)

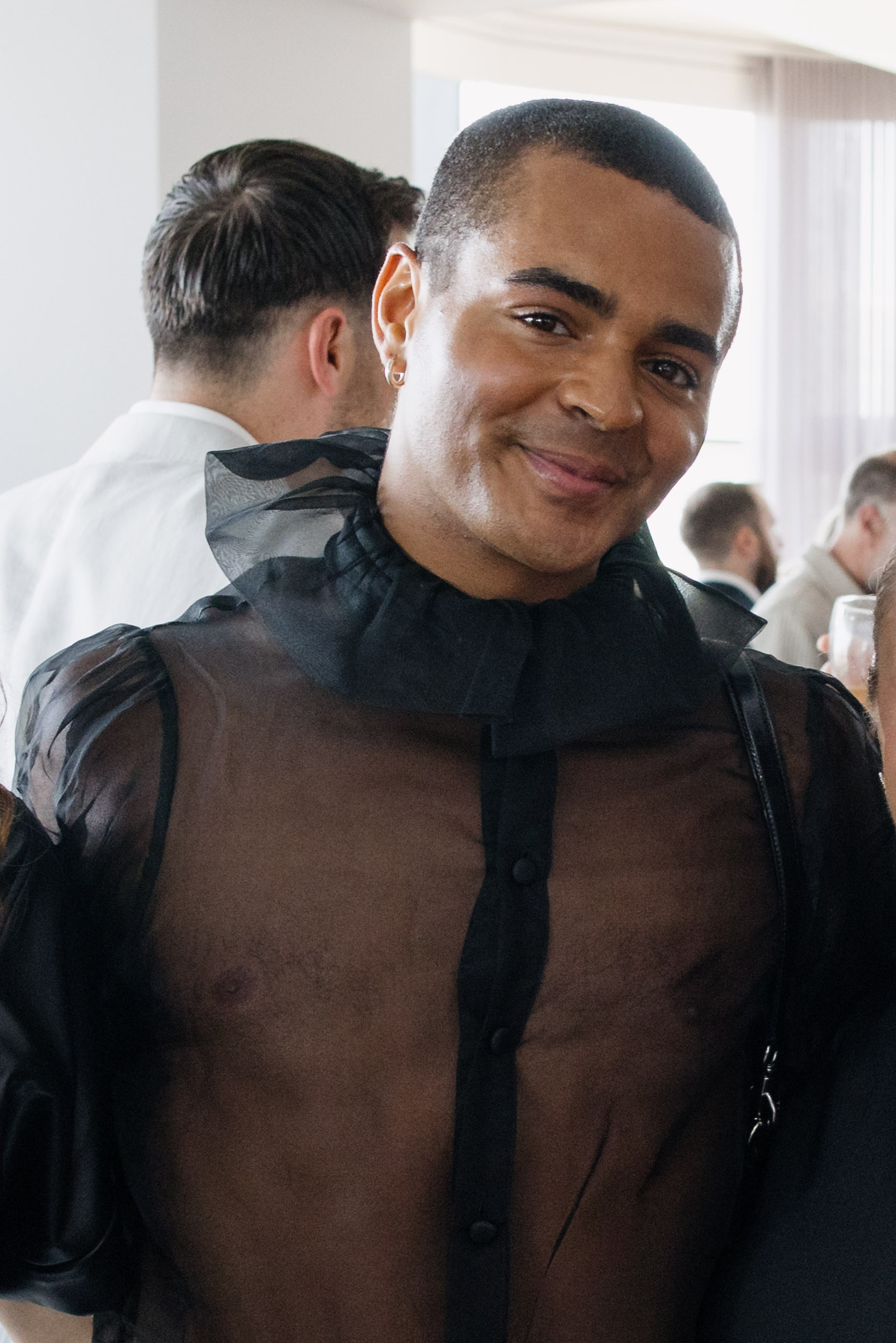
- Williams in 2026
- Born: 13 September 1994 (age 32); Bury, Greater Manchester, England
- Occupations: Actor, dancer, singer
- Years active: 2007–present

Layton Williams (born 13 September 1994) is an English actor, dancer and singer. He won the 2025 Laurence Olivier for Best Supporting Actor in a Musical for his performance in Titanique. Williams began his career as a child actor on the West End, starring as the titular role of Billy Elliot the Musical and Young Michael Jackson in Thriller – Live. As an adult, he went on tour with Rent and Everybody's Talking About Jamie.

On television, Williams is known for his roles in the BBC series Beautiful People (2008–2009) and Bad Education (2012–2014, 2022–2024). He featured in the CBBC documentary series School for Stars, which documented life at the acting school Italia Conti.

== Early life, acting background and education ==
Williams was born in Bury, Greater Manchester, to a white mother and a father of Jamaican descent. He grew up on the Dicky Bird Estate. His paternal grandparents are from Jamaica and his father was born in the UK. He has several siblings and half-siblings.

Williams went to London at age 11 to pursue an acting career. After several months of training at the Billy Elliot Academy in Leeds, Williams debuted in Billy Elliot the Musical on 26 February 2007 in London's West End. His training was documented on The Paul O'Grady Show in which he appeared in on 25 May 2007 and then in several morning TV shows, TV interviews, and short clips related to the musical. He is the second person of colour, the other being Matthew Koon, and the first mixed heritage performer to star in the show. He gave his final performance in the musical on 29 November 2008 while still being the second-longest running performer as 'Billy' in the show's history. On 31 January 2009, two months after his final performance, Williams appeared on the programme Feelgood Factor on ITV, where he and two other 'Billy' actors, Tanner Pflueger and Tom Holland, performed a specially choreographed version of Angry Dance from Billy Elliot the Musical.

Williams took street dance and drama lessons at Carol Godby's theatre workshop in Bury and ballet lessons at Centre Pointe, Manchester. Williams was awarded a scholarship to Sylvia Young Theatre School in Marylebone, London and stayed there until 2008. He attended Broad Oak High School in his home town, Bury, and then the Italia Conti Academy of Theatre Arts in London. During his time at Italia Conti, Williams appeared in a children's documentary School for Stars which was broadcast on the children's television channel CBBC.

== Career ==
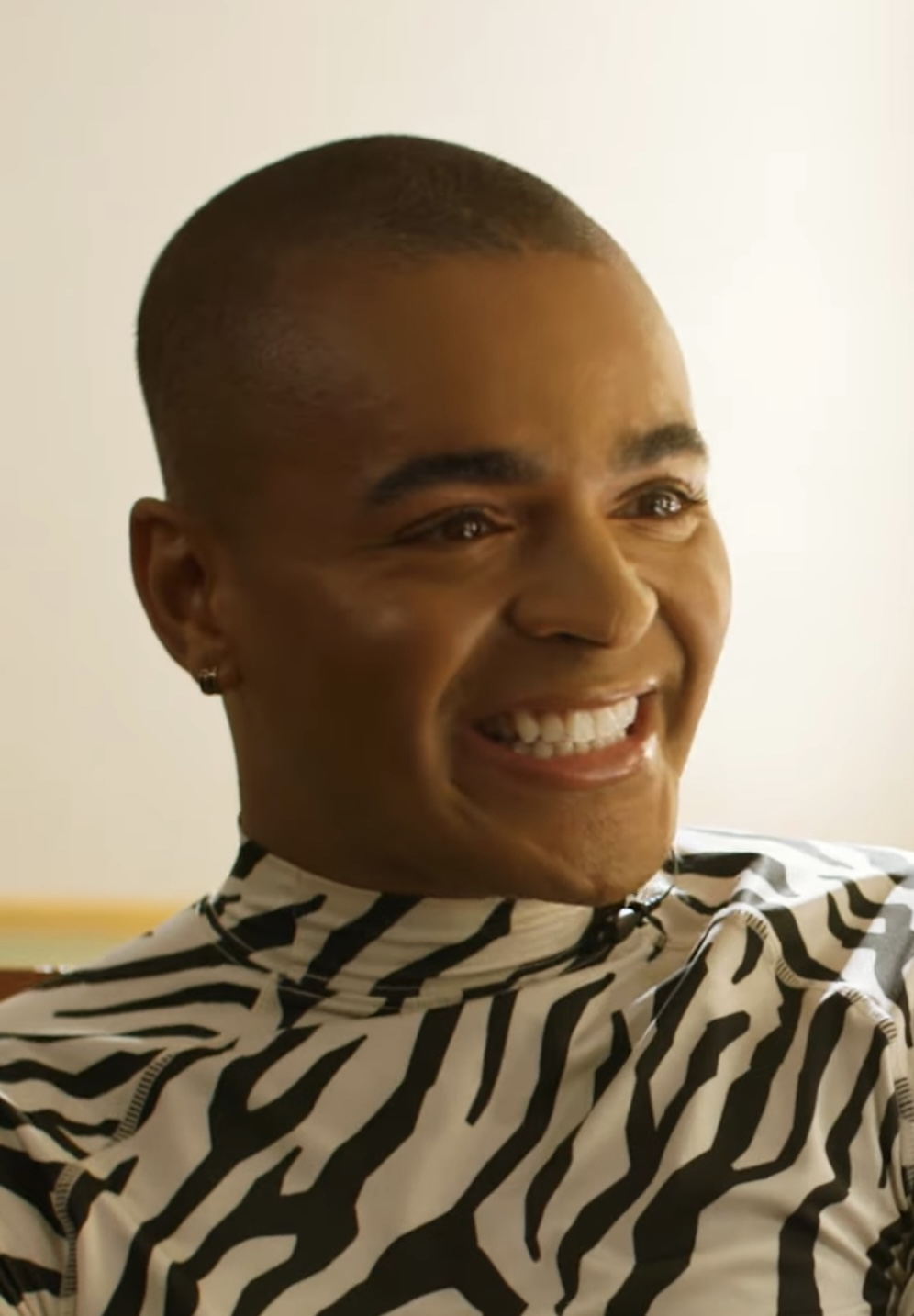
Williams in 2025

He was offered the part as Young Michael Jackson in the West End musical Thriller – Live where he did a few performances before he outgrew the role. Williams became well known to a TV audience as the character Kylie – acting, dancing and singing in the 2008 to 2009 BBC Two comedy Beautiful People, series 1 and 2. From 2012 to 2014, he played Stephen Carmichael in the BBC comedy Bad Education and also appeared in the 2015 spinoff film. Williams returned to the show for the 2022 reunion special and became the co-lead of the show's fourth series alongside Charlie Wernham.

Williams went on tour with Matthew Bourne's show The Car Man. Following that he performed the part of Duane in Hairspray the Musical 2015–2016 tour. He announced that he would also be in the new 20th anniversary cast of Rent which toured the UK from October 2016. He landed the lead role in the hit musical Everybody's Talking About Jamie in the Apollo Theatre in London's West End, where he would play the role of Jamie for 11 months. In August 2019, it was announced Williams would be joining the tour cast of the musical, which was postponed due to the coronavirus pandemic, but later resumed in 2021. The production also made its US premiere at the Ahmanson Theatre in Los Angeles in January 2022 where Williams played also Jamie.

In August 2023, Williams was announced as a contestant on the twenty-first series of Strictly Come Dancing. He was partnered with professional dancer Nikita Kuzmin. They achieved not only their first perfect 40 score, but the first of the whole series in Musicals week, which they followed up with another one in the semi-finals, as well as two in the final. They finished as joint runners-up, alongside Bobby Brazier and Dianne Buswell, losing to winners Ellie Leach and Vito Coppola.

From 3 June to 21 September 2024, Williams played the Emcee in Cabaret at the Kit Kat Club at the Playhouse Theatre opposite Rhea Norwood as Sally Bowles.

Williams then originated the role of Iceberg in the West End premiere of Titanique at the Criterion Theatre in December 2024, which earned him a Laurence Olivier Award for Best Actor in a Supporting Role in a Musical for his performance. He reprised the role for the Broadway transfer for the show at the St. James Theatre in March 2026, which earned him a nomination for Best Featured Actor in a Musical at the 79th Tony Awards.

=== Other ventures ===
Williams is a strong supporter of the charities Stonewall and Ditch the Label.

== Personal life ==
Williams is gay and has spoken about coming to terms with his sexuality while working on Billy Elliot in London.

While on Who Do You Think You Are? in May 2025, he found that his great-great-grandfather, Lance Corporal William Downing, served in the Army Remount Service in WW1 and WW2 and was part of the BEF during the Dunkirk evacuation. After returning to the UK, William Downing ended up in Bury working at a PoW camp there, which is how Williams's family came to Bury. Williams also found out that his five-times great-grandfather Edward Downing was in financial trouble and was even sent to the Queen's Bench Prison.

Williams also discovered on his paternal side, that his three-times great-grandfather, Alexander Denton, was born in 1825 in Jamaica as a slave. He had a twin sister called Peggy. They would have been about nine years old when slavery was abolished in 1834. Williams also discovered that his four-times great-grandmother, Jessy Denton, came to Jamaica sometime before 1807 on one of the slave ships from Africa.

== Acting credits ==
=== Film and television ===
Year	Title	Role	Notes
2008–2009	Beautiful People	Kylie Parkinson	
2010	School For Stars	Himself	
2011	Postcode	Russell	
2012–2014, 2022–2024	Bad Education	Stephen Carmichael	Main cast; 33 episodes
2015	The Bad Education Movie	Stephen Carmichael	Film
2018	Benidorm	Airport check-in assistant	
2020	The Magic of Movie Musicals	Himself	
2021	The Cleaner	Bernard / "Hosea"	Episode: "The Influencer"
2021	Everybody's Talking About Jamie	Dancer	
2022	Queens for the Night	Judge	TV special
2022	I Hate Suzie	Adam Jackson	3 episodes
2023–2025	I Kissed a Boy	Narrator	
2023	Strictly Come Dancing	Contestant	Runner-up; Series 21
2026	People We Meet On Vacation	Officiant	
2026	The Great Celebrity Pottery Throw Down	Contestant	5 episodes
2026	RuPaul's Drag Race UK	Guest Judge	Series 8; Episode 4

=== Theatre ===
Year	Title	Role	Theatre	Location
2007–2008	Billy Elliot	Billy Elliot	Victoria Palace Theatre	West End
2015	The Car Man	Dancer	Royal Albert Hall	London
2016	Hairspray	Duane / Seaweed J. Stubbs (understudy)	UK National Tour	
2016–2017	Rent	Angel	UK National Tour	
2017–2018	Hairspray	Seaweed J. Stubbs	UK National Tour	
2018–2019	Kiss Me, Kate	Paul	Sheffield Crucible	Sheffield
2019–2020	Everybody's Talking About Jamie	Jamie New	Apollo Theatre	West End
2021–2022	Everybody's Talking About Jamie	Jamie New	UK National Tour	
2022	Everybody's Talking About Jamie	Jamie New	Ahmanson Theatre	Los Angeles
2024	Cabaret	Emcee	Kit Kat Club at the Playhouse Theatre	West End
2024–2026	Titanique	Iceberg	Criterion Theatre	West End
2026	Titanique	Iceberg	St. James Theatre	Broadway
2026–2027	Jesus Christ Superstar	King Herod	London Palladium & Theatre Royal, Drury Lane	West End

=== Workshops ===
Year	Title	Theatre	Location
2021	Halls The Musical	Turbine Theatre	London

=== Music videos ===
Year	Ttile	Artist
2020	"Pretty Girl Lie"	Baby Queen
2020	"Santa Baby"	Baby Queen

== Awards ==
Year	Award	Category	Nominated work	Result	Ref(s)
2019	Black British Theatre Awards	Best Male Actor in a Musical	Everybody's Talking About Jamie	Won	
2020	Black British Theatre Awards	LGBTQ+ Champion	Everybody's Talking About Jamie	Won	
2024	Gaydio Awards	Outstanding Entertainment Contribution	Himself	Won	
2025	WhatsOnStage Awards	Best Takeover Performance	Cabaret	Won	
2025	Laurence Olivier Awards	Best Actor in a Supporting Role in a Musical	Titanique	Won	
2026	Drama Desk Awards	Outstanding Featured Performer in a Musical	Titanique	Nominated	
2026	Tony Awards	Best Featured Actor in a Musical	Titanique	Nominated	
2026	Dorian Award	Outstanding Featured Performance in a Broadway Musical	Titanique	Won	
2026	Dorian Award	Broadway Showstopper Award	Titanique	Nominated	

== See also ==
- List of British actors
