= Jack Binstead =

English actor, comedian, and retired athlete

Jack Alexandar Binstead
- Born: 30 September 1996 (age 30); Kingston upon Thames, London, England
- Occupations: Actor and comedian
- Years active: 2008–present
- Children: 1

Jack Alexandar Binstead (born 30 September 1996) is an English actor, comedian, and retired athlete who starred as Rim Dogg in BBC Three's Bad Education. He is also known for his junior career as a British wheelchair athlete. Binstead was diagnosed with osteogenesis imperfecta and has been a wheelchair user since the age of three.

== Filmography ==
=== Television ===
Year	Title	Role	Notes
2012–2022	Bad Education	Rem Dogg	
2019–2020	101 Dalmatian Street	Delgado	Voice

=== Film ===
Year	Title	Role	Notes
2015	The Bad Education Movie	Rem Dogg	
