= Ethan Lawrence =

English actor

- Born: Ethan David Lawrence; 28 September 1992 (age 34); Maldon, Essex, England
- Occupation: Actor
- Years active: 2012–present
- Television: Bad Education; After Life

Ethan David Lawrence (born 28 September 1992) is an English actor. He is known for playing the roles of Joe Poulter in the BBC series Bad Education and James in the Netflix black comedy series After Life. Since 2021, he has played various characters in the CBBC children's comedy sketch show Horrible Histories.

== Life and career ==
Ethan David Lawrence was born on 28 September 1992 in Maldon, Essex where he attended Plume School. Prior to his acting career, Lawrence studied Drama and Creative Writing at Royal Holloway, University of London.

In 2012, Lawrence was cast as Joe Poulter in the BBC Three sitcom Bad Education, which ran for three series. In 2014, he played Ryan in Sky Living comedy series Trying Again. In 2015, he made his film debut playing the role as Fraser in Friday Download: The Movie and later that year, he reprised the role of Joe in the film adaptation of Bad Education, The Bad Education Movie. Over the next few years, Lawrence made several guest appearances in television series such as Flat TV, Avatards and Doc Martin, and also had a small part as John in the 2017 film How to Talk to Girls at Parties. In 2018 however, he struggled to find steady acting work and got a job as a pizza delivery boy.

In 2019, Lawrence had a recurring role in the first series of Ricky Gervais' black comedy-drama series After Life as a teenager who played the recorder with his nose that was interviewed for the newspaper. The character was later established as James and became a regular character in the second and third series. In 2021, Lawrence appeared in an episode of Murder, They Hope as Ray. That same year, he began playing various characters in the CBBC comedy sketch show, Horrible Histories. In 2022, he appeared as Trotter in the film adaptation of Stephen Fry's 1991 novel, The Liar.

== Filmography ==
Year	Title	Role	Notes
2012–2014, 2022	Bad Education	Joe Poulter	Main role
2014	Trying Again	Ryan	Main role
2014	BBC Comedy Feeds	Webby	Episode: "Rude Boys"
2015	Friday Download: The Movie	Fraser	Film
2015	The Bad Education Movie	Joe Poulter	Film
2016	Flat TV	Mikey	4 episodes
2016	Avatards	Daniel	Miniseries
2017	How to Talk to Girls at Parties	John	Film
2017	Doc Martin	Dan Willis	Episode: "Faith"
2017	The Rebel	Sales Lee	Episode: "Money"
2018	Modern Horror Stories	Various	Miniseries
2019–2022	After Life	James	Main role
2021	Murder, They Hope	Ray	Episode: "Evil Under the Bun"
2021–present	Horrible Histories	Various	Ensemble cast
2022	The Liar	Trotter	Film
2023	Magic Mike's Last Dance	Woody	Film
2023	Boat Story	Ben	Main role
2024	Cheap Show presents The Trash Cannes Film Festival 2024	Himself	Webfilm

== Theatre credits ==
Year	Title	Venue	Role	Writer	Director
2017	Cinderella	Lighthouse, Poole	Buttons	Peter Duncan	
