= Charlie Wernham =

English actor and comedian (born 1994)

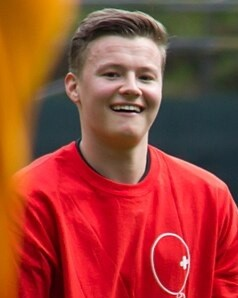
- Wernham in 2014
- Born: Charlie David Wernham; 3 October 1994 (age 32); Billericay, Essex, England, United Kingdom
- Occupations: Actor; comedian
- Years active: 2008–present
- Known for: Britain's Got Talent (2008); School of Comedy (2009–2010); Bad Education (2012–2014, 2022–2023); Hollyoaks (2013–2016, 2024–2025); EastEnders (2021–2022)
- Spouse: Emma Collis (m. 2022)

Charlie David Wernham (born 3 October 1994) is a British actor and comedian from Billericay, Essex. After auditioning for the second series of the ITV talent show Britain's Got Talent, he went on to play Robbie Roscoe in the Channel 4 soap opera Hollyoaks between 2013 and 2016, and again from 2024 to 2025. He also played Mitchell Harper in Bad Education between 2012 and 2014, and again from 2022 to 2024, as well as Aaron Monroe in the BBC soap opera EastEnders from 2021 to 2022. He has also appeared in The Inbetweeners, School of Comedy, and Some Girls.

== Early life ==
Charlie David Wernham was born on 3 October 1994 in Billericay. He started his stand-up comedy act at the age of eight, winning his first talent show at eight. He went on to win three more contests. His father, Dave, helped him write his jokes and structure the routine. Wernham's favourite comedians are Ed Byrne, Peter Kay and Lee Evans.

== Career ==
=== Britain's Got Talent ===
In 2008, Wernham auditioned for the second series of the ITV talent show Britain's Got Talent in London, where he performed a variety of jokes. Judge Piers Morgan commented that the jokes were terrible but delivered a confident performance. Simon Cowell said that "We've had some rotten comedians on this show, but you're the only one who's made me laugh and told jokes that I could understand". Amanda Holden commented that Wernham has "made her moan". Wernham received three 'yes' votes from the judges and was put through to the next round. He made it through to the live semi-finals. In the semi-final on 29 May 2008, he performed a stand-up comedy routine. The performance brought largely positive comments from the judges, though Morgan and Holden said that the jokes were "terrible" but that they still loved the act. Cowell compared him to a funny version of Jim Davidson. He failed to make it through to the final.

=== Acting work ===
After Britain's Got Talent, Wernham began attending the Sylvia Young Theatre School at weekends. He appeared on the E4 comedy The Inbetweeners in the episode "Work Experience" playing Danny Moore, a pupil who beats up Simon Cooper (Joe Thomas). He also starred in the E4 show School of Comedy, playing several characters. The show began airing on 2 October 2009. He appeared in the third series of Harry & Paul on BBC Two in late 2010. He also played the main role Mitchell in the BBC 3 series Bad Education, written by comedian and actor Jack Whitehall, from 2012 to 2014 and also appeared in the 2015 spinoff film. Between 2013 and 2016 he regularly appeared as Robbie Roscoe in Hollyoaks, before returning to the soap in 2024. In 2021, he became a series regular in EastEnders as Aaron Monroe, reuniting him with Gillian Taylforth, who played his mother on Hollyoaks. He departed the following year. Wernham returned to Bad Education for the 2022 reunion special and became co-lead of the show, alongside Layton Williams, for the fourth and fifth series. In 2024, Wernham reprised his role of Robbie Roscoe in Hollyoaks. He departed the show on 6 August 2025 after his character was killed off.

== Personal life ==
Wernham married Emma Collis in April 2022.

== Filmography ==
Year	Title	Role	Notes
2008	Britain's Got Talent	Himself	Contestant, second series
2009	The Inbetweeners	Danny Moore	Episode: "Work Experience"
2009–2010	School of Comedy	Various roles	8 episodes
2010	Ashes to Ashes	Barney Wright	1 episode
2010	Ruddy Hell! It's Harry & Paul	Tyrone Benefit	5 episodes
2012	Some Girls	Rude Schoolboy	1 episode
2012–2014, 2022–2024	Bad Education	Mitchell Harper	Main cast
2015	The Bad Education Movie	Mitchell Harper	Feature film
2013–2016, 2024-2025	Hollyoaks	Robbie Roscoe	Regular role
2016–2017	Mad World	Jason	Episodes: "Summer", "Rise"
2017	Man in an Orange Shirt	Bates	Miniseries
2018	Hooligan Escape: The Russian Job	Davie	TV movie
2018	Urban Myths	Steve Jones	Episode: "The Sex Pistols vs Bill Grundy"
2019	Born Again Builders	Gary	Short film
2020	Break	Wallis	Feature film
2021–2022	EastEnders	Aaron Monroe	Regular role
2022	The Baby	Len	Episode: "The Arrival"
