= Kae Alexander =

Japanese actress (born 1985)

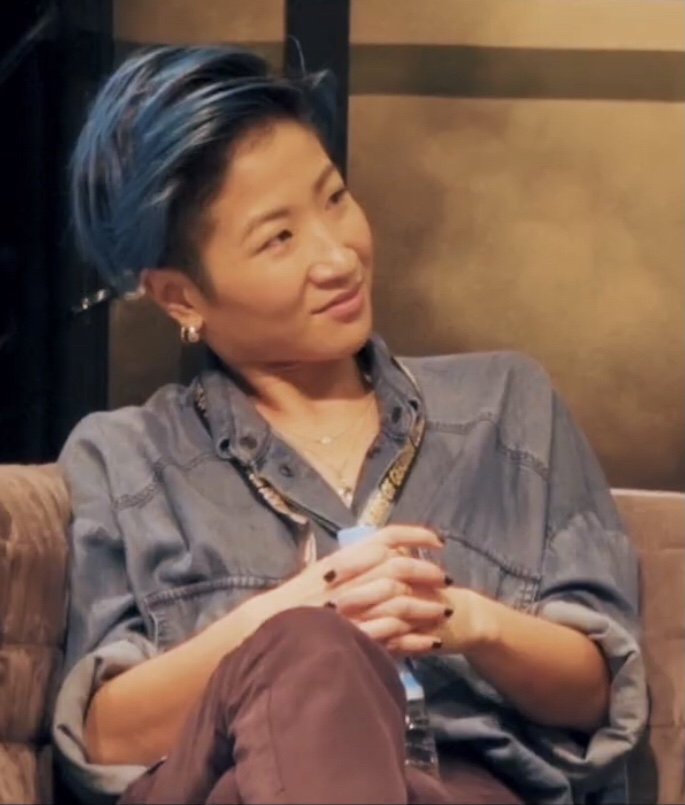
- Alexander at the 2019 German Comic Con Dortmund
- Born: 31 August 1985 (age 41); Kobe, Japan
- Other name: Kae Yukawa
- Education: Guildhall School of Music and Drama
- Occupation: Actress
- Years active: 2008–present

Kae Yukawa (born 31 August 1985), known professionally as Kae Alexander, is a Japanese actress. She gained prominence through her role as Jing Hua in Bad Education and its spinoff film. She played Leaf in the sixth season of Game of Thrones, Linh Xuan Huy in the BBC Two drama Collateral, and Min Farshaw in the Amazon Prime series The Wheel of Time.

She appeared on the Evening Standard's 2017 list of Rising Stars. In 2019, she was selected for the British Academy of Film and Television Arts's Initiative program.

== Early life and education ==
Alexander was born in Kobe. She is of Japanese descent. She spent some of her childhood in Tokyo and lived in Hong Kong for two years before moving to London with her mother Kinu, a chef and culinary teacher, at ten years old. She has a sister and a brother.

Alexander was interested in dance as a teenager and participated in Pineapple Studios classes. She developed an interest in acting through an open house at the BRIT School her friend took her to. She went on to graduate with a Bachelor of Arts from the Guildhall School of Music and Drama in 2011.

== Filmography ==
=== Film ===
Year	Title	Role	Notes
2008	The Box	Agatha	Short film
2012	City Slacker	Young Trader	
2012	Hollow Feet	Keiko	Short film
2015	The Bad Education Movie	Jing Hua	
2015	The White Room	Sun-li	
2015	The Bird Chapters: #1 Monday Mundane	Girl	Short film
2018	Ready Player One	Reb	
2019	Maleficent: Mistress of Evil	Ini	
2019	A Guide to Second Date Sex	Tali	
2021	Infinite	Trace	
2022	Medusa Deluxe	Inez	
2025	Black Bag	Anna Ko	
2025	Primate	Yoko	
2026	Believe Me	Sadie	

=== Television ===
Year	Title	Role	Notes	Ref.
2012–2014	Bad Education	Jing Hua	Main role	
2012	Seconds from Disaster	Stewardess	Episode: "Terrified Over Tokyo"	
2013	Pramface	Julie	Episode: "If You Cry I'll Cry"	
2013	House of Anubis	Erin Blakewood	2 episodes	
2013	Scúp	Ling	Episode: "The Raid"	
2013	Doctors	Mim	Episodes: "A Fair Exchange"	
2015	Gigglebiz	Awesome Girl	Series 4	
2016	Wolfblood	Mai Lin	Episode: "A Long Way from Home"	
2016	Game of Thrones	Leaf	3 episodes	
2016	Bloodworks	Leaf	Episode: "Game of Thrones: Part 1"	
2016	One of Us	Yuki	Miniseries; 3 episodes	
2016	We the Jury	Sam	Pilot	
2016, 2019	Fleabag	Elaine	2 episodes	
2017	Uncle	Lex	Episode: "Bringing Sexy Back"	
2017	W1A	Receptionist	2 episodes	
2018	Hard Sun	Angie Jones	3 episodes	
2018	Strangers	Becky	Main role	
2018	Collateral	Linh Xuan Huy	Main role	
2018	High & Dry	Swallow	Episode: "The Rescue"	
2019	Deep State	Jessica Tamura	Series 2	
2019	Krypton	Araame	4 episodes	
2020	Unprecedented	Bat	1 episode	
2021–2025	The Wheel of Time	Min Farshaw	Main role	
2023	Bodies	Bothroyd	1 episode	

=== Video games ===
Year	Game	Voice role	Notes
2018	Overkill's The Walking Dead	Maya	
2025	Vampire: The Masquerade – Bloodlines 2	Ryong Choi	

== Theatre ==
Year	Title	Role	Notes
2013	Hannah	Young Hannah	Unicorn Theatre, London
2014	Teh Internet is Serious Business	Kayla	Royal Court Theatre, London
2015	Peter Pan	Wendy Darling	Regent's Park Open Air Theatre, London
2017	Gloria	Kendra	Hampstead Theatre, London
2018	The Great Wave	Reiko	Royal National Theatre, London
2018	Trial of Richard III	Lady Anne	Novello Theatre, London
2019	White Pearl	Built	Royal Court Theatre, London
