= Leila Hoffman =

British actor, comedian and writer

- Born: Leila Rothstein; 11 June 1934 (age 92); Hackney, London, England
- Spouse: Alfred Hoffman

Comedy career
- Medium: Television, film, stand up

Leila Hoffman (née Rothstein; born 11 June 1934) is an English comedian, actress and writer.

== Early life ==
Hoffman is the daughter of Esther (née Schaewitch) (1906–1992) and Joseph "Joe" Rothstein, both children of Russian Jews. She has one sister, Sybil Fox, who is four years her senior.

== Career ==
Hoffman starred in BBC Three sitcom, How Not to Live Your Life as Dot Treacher, the widowed neighbour. She has also appeared in several online BBC comedy sketches with the group This is Wondervision.

== Personal life ==
In 1960, Leila married Alfred Hoffman in Brighton, where the Rothstein family had relocated to sometime after Leila's birth.

== Filmography ==
=== Film ===
- Magician's Assistant, Magicians (2007), Intermedia/Universal, Andrew O'Connor.
- Augusta Longbottom, Harry Potter and the Philosopher's Stone (2001), Warner Brothers, Chris Columbus.
- Bag Lady, Felicia's Journey (1999), Marquis Films, Atom Egoyan.
- Principal Witch, The Witches (1990), Jim Henson Films, Nic Roeg.

=== Television ===
- Mrs Rossiter, Doctor Who, DW Productions, Richard Clark
- Old Lady, Not Going Out, Avalon for BBC TV, Nick Wood
- Mrs Treacher, How Not to Live Your Life, Brown Eyed Boy for BBC Three, Sam Leifer
- Mrs Lambert, EastEnders, 25th anniversary DVD, BBC TV, Jenny Darnell
- Mrs Treacher, How Not to Live Your Life, Brown Eyed Boy for BBC Three, Martin Dennis
- Granny Smith, Skins, Company Pictures for E4, Simon Massey
- Mrs Treacher, How Not to Live Your Life, Brown Eyed Boy for BBC Three, Gary Reich
- Mad Alice, Magnolia, Red Productions For BBC TV, Jim Doyle
- Mrs Treacher, How Not to Live Your Life, Brown Eyed Boy, Gary Reich
- Mother, Party Pieces (sketch show), Objective Productions for E4, Paul King
- Barry's Mum, Respectable, Silver River Productions, Dominic Brigstocke
- Various Roles, Old Gits, World of Wonder For BBC TV, Gary Reich
- Old Lady in Various Sketches, There's a German on my Sunbed (6 Eps), Granada TV, Pete Rowe
- Aunt Vera, According to Bex, BBC TV, Dewi Humphreys
- Mrs Mollinson, Bad Education, BBC Three
- Mrs Webster, Beneath the Skin, Granada TV, Sarah Harding
- Gladys Randall, Doctors and Nurses, BBC TV, Caroline Jeffries
- Old Woman-sketches, 15 Storeys High, BBC TV, Mark Nunneley
- Margaret, Grass, BBC TV, Martin Dennis
- Ricky Grover's Mad Aunt Rose, BULLA, BBC Pilot, Andrew Gillman
- Silly Old Lady, MICHAEL BARRYMORE SHOW, LWT, Russel Norman
- Mrs Impey, ONE FOOT IN THE GRAVE, BBC TV, Christine Gernon
- Ricky's Mum, RICKY GERVAIS SHOW, LWT, Various
- Old Lady, THE HIDDEN CAMERA, Pola Jones Films, Carol Chamberlain
- Old Lady, RED HANDED, LWT, David Tibbles
- Mrs Thingy, ROGER ROGER, BBC TV, Tony Dow
- Various Characters, Hearts of Gold – (5 Series Regular), BBC TV, Various
- Miss Jemima Pinkerton, VANITY FAIR, BBC TV, Diarmuid Lawrence
