= Bad Education (TV series) =

British television sitcom

- Genre: Sitcom
- Created by: Jack Whitehall
- Written by: Jack Whitehall; Freddy Syborn
- Directed by: Elliot Hegarty; Freddy Syborn
- Starring: Jack Whitehall; Layton Williams; Charlie Wernham; Mathew Horne; Michelle Gomez; Sarah Solemani; Harry Enfield; Samantha Spiro; Vicki Pepperdine
- Composer: Vince Pope
- Country of origin: United Kingdom
- Original language: English
- No. of series: 5
- No. of episodes: 33 (list of episodes)

Production
- Executive producer: Ben Cavey
- Producer: Pippa Brown
- Running time: 30 minutes
- Production company: Tiger Aspect Productions

Original release
- Network: BBC Three
- Release: 14 August 2012 – 14 October 2014
- Release: 15 December 2022 – 28 January 2024

Related
- The Bad Education Movie (2015)

Bad Education is a British television sitcom set in a dysfunctional secondary school broadcast on BBC Three. Running from August 2012 to October 2014, the first three series were written by Jack Whitehall, who starred as Alfie Wickers, "the worst teacher ever to grace the British education system". Set at the fictional Abbey Grove School in Hertfordshire, the series follows Wickers' class of misfits, Class K, headed by the eccentric headteacher Shaquille "Simon" Fraser (Mathew Horne), and Wickers' ploys to win the affection of crush and fellow teacher, Rosie Gulliver (Sarah Solemani).

As the show received a good reception from critics, and was "a hit with the target audience", The Bad Education Movie starring the original cast was released in 2015. In January 2023, a fourth series aired, although no longer starring Whitehall in a main role (Note: Whitehall only appears in the first episode of the revived series). In the revived show, former pupils Stephen Carmichael (Layton Williams) and Mitchell Harper (Charlie Wernham) return to teach Class K at Abbey Grove, now headed by Bernadette Hoburn (Vicki Pepperdine), with their pupils caught amid their schemes and rivalries. Mathew Horne also returned now as the school cook. A fifth and final series premiered in January 2024 following a 2023 Christmas special.

== Premise ==
The sitcom focuses on Class K, a class of misfits at the fictional Abbey Grove School, a failing secondary school in Watford or Tring, Hertfordshire, and their incompetent teachers.

Series 1-3 focuses on Alfred "Alfie" Wickers (Jack Whitehall) – a posh, newly graduated history teacher. Ever determined to impress his crush, fellow teacher Rosie Gulliver (Sarah Solemani), Alfie makes repeated efforts to appear "cool", such as by coaching the school football team, organising a weapons amnesty, and fielding a candidate for the school elections. He turns to Class K for help in these efforts, despite them often being unsupportive. The class includes shy Joe (Ethan Lawrence), wannabe hard man Mitchell (Charlie Wernham), paraplegic rude boy Rem Dogg (Jack Binstead), sexually promiscuous Chantelle (Nikki Runeckles), camp Stephen (Layton Williams), intelligent but snooty Jing (Kae Alexander), hot-tempered Cleopatra (Weruche Opia), and school bully Frank (Jack Bence) who often bullies Alfie.

At the same time, Alfie finds himself having to cope with the antics of his eccentric, laidback headmaster, Shaquille "Simon" Fraser (Mathew Horne), and meet the expectations of a string of deputy heads: at first ruthless authoritarian Isobel Pickwell (Michelle Gomez), then the cruel yet pathetic Professor Celia "Pro Green" Green (Samantha Spiro), and then his own father, goofy and naïve Martin Wickers (Harry Enfield). It is clarified in the third series that the three series spanned a single academic year - the final year of secondary school.

Series 4 focuses on Stephen and Mitchell, who return to Abbey Grove to teach a new cohort of Class K. The school also has a new headteacher, Bernadette Hoburn (Vicki Pepperdine), with Fraser now working in the canteen. The new pupils are the glamorous Usma (Asha Hassan), the hustling Blessing (Francesca Amewudah-Rivers), the wannabe-rapper Inchez (Anthony J Abraham), the dim-witted Harrison (Bobby Johnson), the smart and introverted Warren (Ali Hadji-Heshmati), and the socially-conscious Jinx (Laura Marcus).

== Production ==
=== Development ===
The first series started airing on 14 August 2012. At the time of the series launch in August 2012, Bad Education broke BBC Three's record for the highest viewing figure for a first episode of a comedy, which was previously held by Horne & Corden, but is now held by Cuckoo.

On 23 August 2012, it was announced that Bad Education would have a second series. The second series premiered on BBC iPlayer on 27 August 2013, a week before the television air date of 3 September. This was part of BBC Three's plans to premiere all its scripted comedy programmes online. The experiment proved successful, as the first episode of the second series received 1.5 million requests prior to its television airing. A Christmas special aired on 17 December 2013.

A pilot for a U.S. adaptation of Bad Education, named An American Education, was ordered by the American Broadcasting Company with Whitehall set to reprise his role as Alfie Wickers. The pilot began filming in Los Angeles in January 2014. However, ABC passed on the pilot on 22 May 2014. Whitehall would continue with the original UK series of the show.

The third series of Bad Education began transmission on 16 September 2014, and ended on 21 October 2014. In late 2014, Whitehall confirmed that the show would not receive a fourth series.

=== Film ===
On 27 February 2015, Whitehall confirmed that a feature film edition of Bad Education was in production. Filming took place in Cornwall, with the majority of the main cast reprising their roles for the film. The Bad Education Movie was released on 21 August 2015 in the UK, and saw Alfie Wickers and Class K travel to Cornwall. Entertainment Film Distributors, who also handled the release of the box-office 2011 hit The Inbetweeners Movie, dealt with the release of the Bad Education Movie. The Bad Education Moviemade around $3.1 million at the box office.

=== Return ===
On 11 May 2022, to celebrate the show's tenth anniversary, the BBC confirmed that a special reunion episode would be broadcast on the recently relaunched BBC Three channel. The special followed the characters Stephen Carmichael (Layton Williams) and Mitchell Harper (Charlie Wernham) becoming teachers. The BBC also announced that the special would be followed by a new six-part series "written by a team of breakthrough writers" following the BBC's plans to invest more money in high-impact comedy programming. The special episode aired on 15 December 2022.

== Cast and characters ==
=== Series 1–3 ===
Alfred Prufrock "Alfie" Wickers (Jack Whitehall) stars as a newly qualified history teacher of Class K. An incompetent but fun-loving teacher, he struggles for authority in his form. He has a crush on fellow teacher Rosie Gulliver (Sarah Solemani), a socially-conscious Biology teacher with whom he enjoys a will-they-won't-they relationship through most of the series. Alfie is good friends with headteacher Shaquille Banter "Simon" Fraser (Mathew Horne), the school’s eccentric, laidback and incompetent headteacher who invests the school's money in unprofitable schemes.

While Alfie enjoys a good relationship with Fraser, he clashes with the school's deputy headteachers, beginning with the strict disciplinarian and fascistic Isobel Pickwell (Michelle Gomez), who fakes her death. She is replaced in Series 2 by Professor Celia "Pro Green" Green (Samantha Spiro), who begins a relationship with Alfie's father, Martin Wickers (Harry Enfield), who in turn replaces Green as deputy headteacher after they marry and Green leaves Martin destitute.

The Class K pupils are:

- Chantelle Parsons (Nikki Runeckles), a sexually-suggestive pupil who teases Alfie.
- Jing Hua (Kae Alexander), the most intelligent and serious pupil of Class K, of Chinese descent, who grows to appreciate Alfie as a "good and decent man". She helps Alfie expose Pickwell's fraudulent expenses claims, and convinces Alfie to continue teaching at the end of Series 3.
- Joe Poulter (Ethan Lawrence), Alfie's closest ally, who willingly humiliates himself to help his teacher. He is the butt of jokes and pranks by other pupils, although they seem to have affection for him, and he grows in confidence by the end of Series 3.
- Mitchell Harper (Charlie Wernham), the tough guy of Alfie's class, who pokes fun at fellow pupils and Alfie, who often retorts back. Mitchell shares a close, banterous friendship with Rem Dogg. Alfie and Mitchell develop their friendship in Series 2 and especially in Series 3, after Alfie successfully helps Mitchell impress Cleopatra, with whom Mitchell is infatuated. In the second episode of Series 3, Mitchell leaves Abbey Grove after his father's fairground is shut down by the council. He returns in "The Exam", in which he is shown in a youth detention centre.
- Leslie "Rem Dogg" Remmington (Jack Binstead) is a pupil who uses a wheelchair. He comes across as a cheeky chap who pokes fun at Alfie, and is very close friends with Mitchell. In Series 3, he becomes an emo and rarely speaks. He becomes emotional when Mitchell gives him an impassioned goodbye, but is called "gay" in response, referencing their light-hearted relationship.
- Stephen Carmichael (Layton Williams) is a camp, gay member of the class. He has a passion for fashion, dancing, musicals and films, and is best friends with Chantelle. In the Christmas special, he begins a relationship with Frank Grayson. He appears not to get on with Frank in Series 3, but Frank agrees to be his date for the prom and they are later crowned Prom King and Queen. He stuns others by breaking homosexual stereotypes, including being good at football and advanced martial arts.
- Frank Grayson (Jack Bence) is the school bully, who intimidates his fellow pupils as well as Alfie. At times, he appears to be insecure about himself, breaking down in Alfie's arms after Pickwell dies and exploring his sexuality in the Christmas special, culminating in a relationship with Stephen. Martin moves Grayson to Class K in order to avoid expelling him, which would have upset his new girlfriend, Grayson's mother. In Series 3, he appears no longer to get along with Stephen, but agrees to be his date to the prom and they are crowned Prom King and Queen.
- Cleopatra Ofoedo (Weruche Opia) is introduced at the start of Series 3. She is aggressive and especially hostile to Alfie and Mitchell. She is black and sensitive to racial issues, frequently accusing others of racism. She agrees to make out with Mitchell, but still does not like him. After Mitchell leaves, she begins making jokes at Alfie's expense like Mitchell used to. Despite her hostility, she admits in the final episode that she likes Abbey Grove.

Recurring characters include:

- Olive Mollinson (Leila Hoffman, series 1 and 4), an elderly Art and Maths teacher.
- Preet van der Plessis (Harry Peacock, series 1 and 3), a South African self-defence tutor who is arrested for attacking Alfie, and later returns to teach PE and declares his infatuation with him.
- Katherine Grayson (Katherine Kingsley), Frank's mother, who begins a relationship with Martin after his breakup with Green. Grayson has a pedigree chihuahua called Coco whom she considers a princess, showing more affection towards Coco than her son. Her relationship with Martin ends after Cleo may have unknowingly killed Coco while she was in Martin's care (Coco is later shown to be unharmed in the post-credit clip).
- Richard (James Fleet, series 3), an ex-boyfriend of Rosie's, who becomes Alfie's love rival.
- Mrs Carmichael (Hillary Whitehall, mother of Jack Whitehall), Stephen's mother, a nurse.

Other notable guest characters who were the focus of episodes included India (Phoebe Waller-Bridge), a drug counsellor; and Kevin Schwimer (Kyle Soller), a fraudulent history teacher who competes with Alfie for the affection of Class K.

=== Series 4–5 ===
The special revival episode featured most of the original cast of pupils, with the exception of Alexander. Bernadette Hoburn (Vicki Pepperdine) is introduced as the blunt, strict new headmistress of Abbey Grove; Horne reprises his role as Fraser, but it is explained that he accepted a promotion to working in the school's kitchens.

The episode introduced a new set of Class K pupils, and set the premise for Williams and Wernham to reprise their roles as Stephen Carmichael and Mitchell Harper in the fourth series, teaching Drama and PE. Hoburn navigates their rivalries and antics, as do the pupils with whom they compete for affection. The new Class K pupils were:

- Usma (Asha Hassan), the glamorous, social media obsessed gossip of the class. She is shown to be image-conscious, sassy and popular. She is partially based on how Stephen was portrayed in the original series; Williams said that he was consulted as part of the creation of the character.
- Blessing (Francesca Amewudah-Rivers), a money-oriented member of the class who is always hustling and running scams which can sometimes get her into trouble with some of the teachers and other pupils. Blessing is often Mitchell's sidekick for his schemes.
- Inchez (Anthony J Abraham), an aspiring rapper who tries to project a front that he is cool, though the rest of Class K do not take him very seriously.
- Harrison (Bobby Johnson), a dim-witted but loyal member of the class. Due to his lack of intelligence, Harrison is always willing to go along with whatever plans his friends or his teachers suggest.
- Warren (Ali Hadji-Heshmati), a smart, quiet member of the class who prefers to keep to himself. He is conscientious and organised, meaning that he often ends up having to neglect his studies in order to help Stephen's latest efforts to become a star.
- Jemima "Jinx" (Laura Marcus), a socially-conscious member of the class who appears to be completely aware of her own privilege.

Hoffman reprised her role as Olive Mollinson in a guest appearance in the fourth and fifth series while Hilary Whitehall reprises her role as Stephen Carmichael's mother. Bianca Del Rio makes a guest appearance in episode two.

== Episodes ==
Series	Episodes	Originally released		Average viewership (in millions)
Series	Episodes	First released	Last released	Average viewership (in millions)
1	6	14 August 2012	18 September 2012	1.195
2	6	3 September 2013	8 October 2013	0.970
2	Special	17 December 2013		0.970
3	6	16 September 2014	21 October 2014	0.854
4	Special	15 December 2022		—N/a
4	6	15 January 2023	12 February 2023	—N/a
5	Special	13 December 2023		—N/a
5	6	14 January 2024	28 January 2024	—N/a

== Reception ==
Rotten Tomatoes gave Bad Education 71%; a critic said, "the script is patchy and the story is too silly for its own good but there are enough laughs to make this a hit with the target audience" The Guardian called the series "funny and occasionally in creditably poor taste", but accused Whitehall of "phoning it in".

The revival series received a mixed reception. Radio Times praised the decision to allow viewers to say goodbye to Whitehall's character in the reunion special and noted "this new season of Bad Education is a joyful, quick-witted and comforting reminder of the old show, while still marking out its own territory with some smart casting decisions and structural shake-ups" and highlighted the strength of the Williams and Wernham as a double-act, the writing, the "genius" and "outrageous" reinvention of Horne's character, and the introduction of Pepperdine's headmistress and the new student characters. In The Guardian, Jack Seale gave the series two stars, calling it "juvenile", "still lack[ing] any coherent structure or purpose", and a "pointless revival", but "slightly better" than the original show and "not as obviously empty-hearted".

== Home media ==
=== DVD releases ===
Title	Release date (region 2)	Running time	Special features
Series 1	9 September 2013	168 mins	Making of Bad Education; Video Diaries
Series 2	29 September 2014	205 mins	Audio Commentary on Episode 1
Series 1–2	29 September 2014	373 mins	Making of Bad Education; Video Diaries; Audio Commentary on Series 2, Episode 1
Series 3	31 August 2015	168 mins	—N/a
Series 1–3	31 August 2015	540 mins	Making of Bad Education; Video Diaries; Audio Commentary on Series 2, Episode 1
