= A League of Their Own (disambiguation) =

A League of Their Own is a 1992 American film by Penny Marshall.

A League of Their Own may also refer to:

- A League of Their Own (British game show), a British television game show
  - A League of Their Own (Australian game show), an Australian version of the above show
- A League of Their Own (1993 TV series), an American television series based on the film
- A League of Their Own (2022 TV series), an American television series based on the film
- "A League of Their Own", an episode of the American comedy series Ugly Betty
- "A League of Their Own", a two-part episode of Static Shock
