= List of A League of Their Own episodes =

A League of Their Own is a British television comedy panel game created by Paul Brassey which was hosted by actor and comedian James Corden for the first 13 series. Due to his commitments hosting The Late Late Show, Corden hosted only two episodes of series 14 with the remainder hosted by guests. Travel restrictions caused by the COVID-19 pandemic prevented Corden returning for series 15 as expected, the series was predominately hosted by regular panellist Romesh Ranganathan, with team captains Andrew "Freddie" Flintoff and Jamie Redknapp hosting one episode each. Ranganathan was confirmed as the new permanent host, starting from series 16. It premiered on Sky One on 11 March 2010 and remained on the channel until September 2021 when Sky One was closed and replaced with Sky Max where the show is now broadcast.

A regular episode of A League of Their Own sees two teams of three – Blue and Red – competing in a quiz about notable sports along with physical challenges; at the show's debut the captains of each team were retired England cricketer Andrew "Freddie" Flintoff (Blue) and former Liverpool captain and England midfielder Jamie Redknapp (Red). For the first four series both teams had a regular panellist alongside the captain, journalist and presenter Georgie Thompson (Blue) and comedian John Bishop (Red). From series 5 until series 12, the Blue team had a regular panellist with comedian Jack Whitehall joining Flintoff. From series 13 to series 15, comedian Romesh Ranganathan was a regular panellist for the Red team alongside Redknapp, albeit with Ranganathan hosting most episodes in series 15. With Ranganathan's promotion to host from series 16, neither team had a regular panellist. Flintoff left the show following the Dingle to Dover road trip and has since been replaced by a guest captain each episode, retired footballer Micah Richards joined the Blue team as a regular panellist. Special episodes have also been produced where there is no quiz instead they feature compilations of clips either from recordings that have been broadcast in a series (labelled "The Best Bits from..."), material that was not broadcast (labelled "The Unseen Bits from...") or even from a particular challenge from an individual episode (labelled "The Best of...").

The first series consisted of twelve episodes. The second series consisted of thirteen episodes including a Christmas special. The third series had twelve episodes and saw the first occasion of a regular team captain being unable to attend an individual recording and being replaced by a guest, it also saw the introduction of splitting both "The Best Bits" and "The Unseen Bits" over two episodes therefore having four episodes of compilation clips; this technique was used on and off for future series. The fourth series consisted of ten episodes including an End of Year special. For the fifth series there were eleven episodes. The sixth series had ten episodes. The seventh series had twelve episodes including a compilation episode entitled "Rally Special" focussing solely on the rally car challenge from the series opener. The eighth series consisted of thirteen episodes. The ninth series had twelve episodes. The tenth series had ten episodes. As of 24 March 2023, 138 regular episodes and 54 compilations or specials have been broadcast across sixteen series, 192 episodes have been aired in total. There has also been seven Road Trip spin off series, two in the US, two in Europe, one in the UK, one in the UK & Ireland and one in Southeast Asia. There have been 27 regular episodes and 14 compilations for a total of 41 Road Trip episodes.

Contents

Series: 1 · 2 · 3 · 4 · 5 · 6 · 7 · 8 · 9 · 10 · 11 · 12 · 13 · 14 · 15 · 16 · 17 · 18 · 19 · 20

Road Trips: US · US 2.0 · Europe 1 · Europe 2 · Loch Ness to London · Dingle to Dover · Southeast Asia

Scores · Notes · References · External links

== Episode list ==
=== Key ===
- – Episodes with this background, and when the number on the left in the scores column is greater than the one on the right, were won by the Blue team (Flintoff with Thompson up to series four, Flintoff with Whitehall from series 5-12, Flintoff individually from series 13-16, guest captains with Micah Richards from series 17 and Jill Scott with Richards from series 18)
- – Episodes with this background, and when the number on the right in the scores column is greater than the one on the left, were won by the Red team (Redknapp with Bishop up to series four, Redknapp individually from series 5-12 & 15-17, Redknapp with Ranganathan from series 13-14 and Redknapp with Mo Gilligan from series 18)
- – Episodes with this background, and when the numbers on the left and right are equal, ended in a draw
- When a guest is listed in **bold** with a dagger symbol (†) it means they were team captain for that team in the episode as the regular captain was unable to make the recording or presented the show as guest host
- **No.** = The episode's order in the overall show

=== Series 1 ===
No.	Episode	First broadcast	Freddie and Georgie's guest	Jamie and John's guests	Scores
1	01x01	11 March 2010	Neil Morrissey	David Haye	9–5
2	01x02	18 March 2010	Alastair Campbell	Ruth Jones	12–9
3	01x03	25 March 2010	Neil Morrissey	Abbey Clancy	7–8
4	01x04	1 April 2010	Dara Ó Briain	Steve Harmison	13–7
5	01x05	8 April 2010	Jack Whitehall	Amir Khan	9–8
6	01x06	15 April 2010	Jimmy Carr	Karen Pickering	8–5
7	01x07	22 April 2010	Dara Ó Briain	Claudia Winkleman	7–8
8	01x08	29 April 2010	Bob Mortimer	Tom Daley	4–7
9	01x09	6 May 2010	Ardal O'Hanlon	Gabby Logan	6–8
10	01x10	13 May 2010	Stephen Mangan	Matthew Le Tissier	9–11
11	01x11	20 May 2010	Compilation episode – "The Best of Series 1"		—N/a
12	01x12	27 May 2010	Compilation episode – "The Unseen Bits from Series 1"		—N/a

=== Series 2 ===
No.	Episode	First broadcast	Freddie and Georgie's guest	Jamie and John's guests	Scores
13	02x01	7 October 2010	Jimmy Carr	Lily Allen	11–9
14	02x02	14 October 2010	Chris Evans	Tim Henman	9–9
15	02x03	21 October 2010	Rob Brydon	Jessica Ennis	4–3
16	02x04	21 October 2010	Jack Whitehall	Michael Owen	9–9
17	02x05	28 October 2010	Clare Balding	Tinchy Stryder	9–5
18	02x06	28 October 2010	Dermot O'Leary	Phillips Idowu	10–11
19	02x07	4 November 2010	Amanda Holden	Kevin Pietersen	1–4
20	02x08	4 November 2010	Patrick Kielty	Joe Calzaghe	4–10
21	02x09	11 November 2010	Eamonn Holmes	David James	9–8
22	02x10	11 November 2010	Jimmy Carr	Theo Paphitis	10–9
23	02x11	12 November 2010	Compilation episode – "The Best of Series 2"		—N/a
24	02x12	19 December 2010	Compilation episode – "The Unseen Bits from Series 2"		—N/a
25	02x13	23 December 2010 (Note: Christmas special)	Ruth Jones	Ricky Hatton	6–9

=== Series 3 ===
No.	Episode	First broadcast	Freddie and Georgie's guest	Jamie and John's guests	Scores
26	03x01	4 March 2011	Jimmy Carr	Phil Taylor	4–4
27	03x02	11 March 2011	Dara Ó Briain	Gaël Clichy	5–6
28	03x03	25 March 2011	Lee Mack	Rio Ferdinand	7–8
29	03x04	1 April 2011	Clare Balding	Boris Becker	6–3
30	03x05	8 April 2011	Jimmy Carr	Mike Tindall	3–9
31	03x06	15 April 2011	Robbie Fowler	Christine Bleakley	7–9
32	03x07	22 April 2011	Jack Whitehall	Amy Williams	5–6
33	03x08	29 April 2011	Kevin Bridges	**Dermot O'Leary** †; Alastair Cook	7–5
34	03x09	6 May 2011	Compilation episode – "The Unseen Bits from Series 3 (Part 1)"		—N/a
35	03x10	13 May 2011	Compilation episode – "The Best of Series 3 (Part 1)"		—N/a
36	03x11	20 May 2011	Compilation episode – "The Best of Series 3 (Part 2)"		—N/a
37	03x12	27 May 2011	Compilation episode – "The Unseen Bits from Series 3 (Part 2)"		—N/a

=== Series 4 ===
No.	Episode	First broadcast	Freddie and Georgie's guest	Jamie and John's guests	Scores
38	04x01	7 October 2011	Jason Manford	Andy Murray	8–6
39	04x02	14 October 2011	**Lee Mack** †; Frank Lampard	Gabby Logan	5–7
40	04x03	21 October 2011	Jack Whitehall	Rory McIlroy	6–7
41	04x04	28 October 2011	Phill Jupitus	Peter Crouch	8–6
42	04x05	4 November 2011	Jimmy Carr	James Anderson	6–7
43	04x06	11 November 2011	David Walliams	Gary Neville	9–9
44	04x07	18 November 2011	Jimmy Carr	Mark Webber	9–6
45	04x08	16 December 2011 (Note: End of Year special)	Stacey Solomon	Gabby Logan	7–5
46	04x09	6 January 2012	Compilation episode – "The Unseen Bits from Series 4"		—N/a
47	04x10	13 January 2012	Compilation episode – "The Best of Series 4"		—N/a

=== Series 5 ===
No.	Episode	First broadcast	Freddie and Jack's guest	Jamie's guests	Scores
48	05x01	20 April 2012	Georgie Thompson	Steven Gerrard; John Bishop	8–8
49	05x02	27 April 2012	Louise Hazel	**Peter Crouch** †; Jimmy Carr; John Bishop	7–7
50	05x03	4 May 2012	Jessica Ennis	Gabby Logan; Micky Flanagan	8–6
51	05x04	11 May 2012	Zoë Ball	Jermain Defoe; John Bishop	4–4
52	05x05	18 May 2012	Mo Farah	Clare Balding; David Walliams	5–8
53	05x06	25 May 2012	Ronnie O'Sullivan	Christine Bleakley; Jimmy Carr	12–10
54	05x07	1 June 2012	Gabby Logan	Graeme Souness; Kevin Bridges	4–4 (Note: As the game ended in a draw an arm wrestling tiebreaker was played between Whitehall (Blue) and Souness (Red). Souness won making the red team the winners.)
55	05x08	8 June 2012	Claudia Winkleman	Joe Hart; John Bishop	14–12
56	05x09	15 June 2012	Compilation episode – "The Unseen Bits from Series 5 (Part 1)"		—N/a
57	05x10	22 June 2012	Compilation episode – "The Unseen Bits from Series 5 (Part 2)"		—N/a
58	05x11	29 June 2012	Compilation episode – "The Best of Series 5"		—N/a

=== Series 6 ===
No.	Episode	First broadcast	Freddie and Jack's guest	Jamie's guests	Scores
59	06x01	26 October 2012	Claudia Winkleman	Mo Farah; John Bishop	6–3
60	06x02	2 November 2012	Rebecca Adlington	Sir Chris Hoy; David Walliams	6–10
61	06x03	9 November 2012	Charlotte Jackson	Harry Redknapp; Johnny Vegas	6–4
62	06x04	16 November 2012	Jimmy Carr	Jessica Ennis; Micky Flanagan	8–8
63	06x05	23 November 2012	Frank Lampard	**Gabby Logan** †; Shane Warne; Jason Manford	6–8
64	06x06	30 November 2012	Laura Trott	Zara Phillips; Micky Flanagan	9–19
65	06x07	7 December 2012	Sarah Millican	Victoria Pendleton; John Bishop	4–7
66	06x08	14 December 2012	Vincent Kompany	Billie Piper; Lee Mack	9–4
67	06x09	21 December 2012	Compilation episode – "The Unseen Bits from Series 6 (Part 1)"		—N/a
68	06x10	28 December 2012	Compilation episode – "The Unseen Bits from Series 6 (Part 2)"		—N/a

=== Series 7 ===
No.	Episode	First broadcast	Freddie and Jack's guest	Jamie's guests	Scores
69	07x01	23 August 2013	Amy Williams	Edgar Davids; Jimmy Carr	6–11
70	07x02	30 August 2013	Sara Cox	Harry Styles; Louis Tomlinson; Niall Horan	13–14
71	07x03	6 September 2013	Sarah Storey	Sam Allardyce; David Walliams	9–7
72	07x04	13 September 2013	Paula Radcliffe	Chris Ashton; Richard Ayoade	10–9
73	07x05	20 September 2013	Gabby Logan	Joleon Lescott; Jon Richardson	9–11
74	07x06	27 September 2013	Matt Smith; Kriss Akabusi	Perri Shakes-Drayton; Jonathan Ross	13–8
75	07x07	4 October 2013	Richard Ayoade	Nicola Adams; David Walliams	6–11
76	07x08	11 October 2013	Alan Shearer	Frankie Sandford; Jason Manford	13–12
77	07x09	18 October 2013	Compilation episode – "The Unseen Bits from Series 7 (Part 1)"		—N/a
78	07x10	25 October 2013	Compilation episode – "The Unseen Bits from Series 7 (Part 2)"		—N/a
79	07x11	1 November 2013	Compilation episode – "The Best of the Rally Car Special"		—N/a
80	07x12	8 November 2013	Compilation episode – "The Best of Series 7"		—N/a

=== Series 8 ===
No.	Episode	First broadcast	Freddie and Jack's guest	Jamie's guests	Scores
81	08x01	29 August 2014	Frank Lampard	Judy Murray; Kevin Bridges	6–7
82	08x02	5 September 2014	Laura Whitmore	Andros Townsend; Micky Flanagan	2–9
83	08x03	12 September 2014	Joe Hart	Kevin Pietersen; Josh Widdicombe	9–11
84	08x04	19 September 2014	Una Foden	Kevin Keegan; Russell Howard	12–11
85	08x05	26 September 2014	Jamie Carragher	Kirsty Gallacher; Jimmy Carr	15–14
86	08x06	3 October 2014	Lennox Lewis	Christine Ohuruogu; Sean Lock	7–7
87	08x07	10 October 2014	Pixie Lott	Robbie Fowler; David Walliams	13–14
88	08x08	17 October 2014	Jenny Jones	Gianfranco Zola; Johnny Vegas	8–9
89	08x09	17 October 2014	Compilation episode – "The Unseen Bits from Series 8 (Part 1)"		—N/a
90	08x10	24 October 2014	Compilation episode – "The Unseen Bits from Series 8 (Part 2)"		—N/a
91	08x11	31 October 2014	Compilation episode – "The Unseen Bits from Series 8 (Part 3)"		—N/a
92	08x12	31 October 2014	Compilation episode – "The Unseen Bits from Series 8 (Part 4)"		—N/a
93	08x13	24 December 2014	Compilation episode – "The Best of Series 1–8"		—N/a

=== Series 9 ===
No.	Episode	First broadcast	Freddie and Jack's guest	Jamie's guests	Scores
94	09x01	15 May 2015	Olivia Wayne	Ian Poulter; Josh Widdicombe	7–6
95	09x02	22 May 2015	Jennifer Saunders	Wojciech Szczęsny; Alex Brooker	8–13
96	09x03	29 May 2015	Jenny Jones; Robbie Savage	Anthony Joshua; Jimmy Carr	2–2
97	09x04	5 June 2015	Heather Watson	Patrick Kluivert; Trevor Noah	10–8
98	09x05	12 June 2015	Peter Schmeichel	Jenny Jones; Josh Widdicombe	8–4
99	09x06	19 June 2015	Amanda Holden	John Barnes; Aisling Bea	7–4
100	09x07	26 June 2015	Tom Daley	Katarina Johnson-Thompson; Romesh Ranganathan	5–6
101	09x08	3 July 2015	Gabby Logan	Kevin Nolan; Micky Flanagan	6–8
102	09x09	10 July 2015	Compilation episode – "The Best Bits from Series 9 (Part 1)"		—N/a
103	09x10	17 July 2015	Compilation episode – "The Best Bits from Series 9 (Part 2)"		—N/a
104	09x11	24 July 2015	Compilation episode – "The Unseen Bits from Series 9 (Part 1)"		—N/a
105	09x12	31 July 2015	Compilation episode – "The Unseen Bits from Series 9 (Part 2)"		—N/a

=== Series 10 ===
No.	Episode	First broadcast	Freddie and Jack's guest	Jamie's guests	Scores
106	10x01	7 January 2016	Melanie C	Andy Carroll; David Walliams	7–12
107	10x02	14 January 2016	Aisling Bea; Jade Jones (Note: Jones and Merrigold only joined for the Right Guard Challenge)	Ashley Cole; Noel Fielding; Aston Merrygold	6–9
108	10x03	21 January 2016	Kate Abdo	Aaron Ramsey; Romesh Ranganathan	7–14
109	10x04	28 January 2016	Claudia Winkleman	Jimmy Carr; Micah Richards	8–7
110	10x05	4 February 2016	James DeGale	Rob Beckett; Denise Lewis	8–7
111	10x06	11 February 2016	Sir Chris Hoy	A. P. McCoy; Katherine Ryan	12–6
112	10x07	18 February 2016	Ricky Ponting; Joel Creasey	Jon Richardson (Note: Whitehall appeared on Redknapp's team in this episode.)	19–11
113	10x08	25 February 2016	Nicole Scherzinger	Noel Fielding; James Haskell	15–8
114	10x09	3 March 2016	Compilation episode – "The Unseen Bits from Series 10"		—N/a
115	10x10	10 March 2016	Compilation episode – "The Best Bits from Series 10"		—N/a

=== US Road Trip ===
No.	Episode	First broadcast	Freddie's points	Jack's points	Jamie's points
116	USx01	10 May 2016	7	8	7
117	USx02	17 May 2016	8	4	11
118	USx03	24 May 2016	12	6	4
119	USx04	31 May 2016	Compilation episode – "The Unseen Bits"		

=== Series 11 ===
No.	Episode	First broadcast	Freddie and Jack's guest	Jamie's guests	Scores
120	11x01	22 September 2016	Anthony Joshua	Roisin Conaty; Rob Beckett	10–15
121	11x02	29 September 2016	Alesha Dixon	John McEnroe; Jimmy Carr	4–4
122	11x03	6 October 2016	Johanna Konta	Harry Redknapp; David Walliams	13–13
123	11x04	13 October 2016	Niall Horan	Kirsty Gallacher; Nick Grimshaw	9–5
124	11x05	20 October 2016	David Baddiel	Tony Adams; Aisling Bea	11–9
125	11x06	27 October 2016	Alex Scott	Ruud Gullit; Kevin Bridges	8–6
126	11x07	3 November 2016	Judy Murray	Daniel Ricciardo; Rob Beckett	6–8
127	11x08	10 November 2016	Joey Barton	Katherine Ryan; John Bishop	10–5
128	11x09	17 November 2016	Compilation episode – "The Unseen Bits from Series 11"		—N/a
129	11x10	24 November 2016	Compilation episode – "The Best Bits from Series 11"		—N/a
130	11x11	24 December 2016	Compilation episode		—N/a

=== US Road Trip 2.0 ===
No.	Episode	First broadcast
131	US2x01	5 June 2017
132	US2x02	12 June 2017
133	US2x03	19 June 2017
134	US2x04	26 June 2017
135	US2x05	3 July 2017 (Note: Unseen Bits compilation episode)
136	US2x06	10 July 2017
137	US2x07	17 July 2017 (Note: Best Bits compilation episode)

=== A Premier League of Their Own ===
No.	Episode	First broadcast	Freddie and Jack's guest	Jamie's guests	Scores
138	Sp.	10 August 2017	Kelly Cates	Thierry Henry; Jeff Stelling	

=== Series 12 ===
No.	Episode	First broadcast	Freddie and Jack's guest	Jamie's guests	Scores
139	12x01	14 September 2017	Rob Beckett	Dele Alli; Stephen Mangan	17–9
140	12x02	21 September 2017	Emma Bunton	Mo Farah; Anthony Joshua	4–13
141	12x03	28 September 2017	Sam Quek	Tony Bellew; Romesh Ranganathan	6–6
142	12x04	5 October 2017	Charlotte Dujardin	Cesc Fàbregas; Romesh Ranganathan	5–3
143	12x05	12 October 2017	Piers Morgan	Paul Merson; Roisin Conaty	9–13
144	12x06	19 October 2017	Sara Cox	Bradley Wiggins; Jimmy Carr	11–9
145	12x07	26 October 2017	Jessica Ennis-Hill	Robbie Keane; Romesh Ranganathan	10–10
146	12x08	5 December 2017	Compilation episode – "The Unseen Bits from Series 12"		—N/a
147	12x09	12 December 2017	Compilation episode – "The Best Bits from Series 12"		—N/a
148	12x10	21 December 2017	Compilation episode		—N/a

=== Series 13 ===
No.	Episode	First broadcast	Freddie's guests	Jamie and Romesh's guest	Scores
149	13x01	30 August 2018	Alan Carr; Lizzy Yarnold	Tony Bellew	8–9
150	13x02	6 September 2018	Rob Beckett; Judy Murray	Jack Wilshere	14–7
151	13x03	13 September 2018	David Walliams; Helen Skelton	Adam Peaty	27–22
152	13x04	20 September 2018	Rob Beckett; Patrice Evra	Roisin Conaty	13–4
153	13x05	27 September 2018	Rob Beckett; Mo Farah	Tracey Neville	20–18
154	13x06	4 October 2018	Tom Davis; Wladimir Klitschko	Nicola Adams	8–8
155	13x07	11 October 2018	Josh Widdicombe; Geri Horner	John Terry	9–9
156	13x08	18 October 2018	Rob Beckett; Ellie Simmonds	Ashley Cole	11–7
157	13x09	25 October 2018	Compilation episode – "The Unseen Bits from Series 13"		—N/a
158	13x10	1 November 2018	Compilation episode – "The Best Bits from Series 13"		—N/a
159	13x11	20 December 2018	Compilation episode		—N/a

=== European Road Trip ===
No.	Episode	First broadcast
160	EUx01	10 January 2019
161	EUx02	17 January 2019
162	EUx03	24 January 2019
163	EUx04	31 January 2019
164	EUx05	7 February 2019
165	EUx06	14 February 2019

=== Series 14 ===
No.	Episode	First broadcast	Host	Freddie's guests	Jamie and Romesh's guest	Scores
166	14x01	15 August 2019	James Corden	Fearne Cotton; James Anderson	Joe Cole	11–14
167	14x02	22 August 2019	James Corden	Laura Woods; Robin van Persie	Tony Bellew	3–5
168	14x03	29 August 2019	Jack Whitehall	Tom Davis; Helen Skelton	David Ginola	6–3
169	14x04	5 September 2019	Clare Balding	Rob Beckett; Chemmy Alcott	Harry Winks	10–9
170	14x05	12 September 2019	Romesh Ranganathan	Rob Beckett; Lauren Steadman	Jermaine Jenas; Tom Allen	4–6
171	14x06	19 September 2019	Freddie Flintoff	**Lee Mack** †; Sam Quek; Dina Asher-Smith	Kevin Bridges	9–8
172	14x07	26 September 2019	Amanda Holden	Guz Khan; Alex Scott	Harry Redknapp	9–11
173	14x08	3 October 2019	David Walliams	Jimmy Carr; Max Whitlock	Helen Skelton	7–5
174	14x09	10 October 2019	Compilation episode – "The Unseen Bits from Series 14"			—N/a
175	14x10	17 October 2019	Compilation episode – "The Best Bits from Series 14"			—N/a
176	14x11	19 December 2019	Christmas Special			—N/a

=== European Road Trip 2 ===
No.	Episode	First broadcast
177	EU2x01	9 January 2020
178	EU2x02	16 January 2020
179	EU2x03	23 January 2020
180	EU2x04	30 January 2020
181	EU2x05	6 February 2020
182	EU2x06	13 February 2020

=== Series 15 ===
No.	Episode	First broadcast	Host	Freddie's guests	Jamie's guests	Scores
183	15x01	20 August 2020	Romesh Ranganathan	Rob Beckett; Jimmy Carr	Andy Murray; Helen Skelton	2–6
184	15x02	27 August 2020	Romesh Ranganathan	Alan Carr; Kerry Godliman	Anthony Joshua; Jimmy Carr	10–9
185	15x03	3 September 2020	Jamie Redknapp	Rob Beckett; Dina Asher-Smith	**Micah Richards** †; Rhys James; Romesh Ranganathan	(Note: The red team were announced as winners, but no score was shown.)
186	15x04	10 September 2020	Romesh Ranganathan	Tom Davis; Heather Watson	Eric Dier; Tom Allen	8–9
187	15x05	17 September 2020	Romesh Ranganathan	Joel Dommett; Adam Peaty	Dina Asher-Smith; Tom Davis	9–10
188	15x06	24 September 2020	Romesh Ranganathan	Alan Carr; Jade Jones	Tony Bellew; Jonathan Ross	11–9
189	15x07	1 October 2020	Romesh Ranganathan	Jesse Lingard; Sam Quek	Eddie Hearn; Mo Gilligan	11–7
190	15x08	8 October 2020	Freddie Flintoff	**Ally McCoist**†; Josh Widdicombe; Laura Woods	Alex Brooker	12–11
191	15x09	15 October 2020	Compilation episode – "The Unseen Bits from Series 15"			—N/a
192	15x10	22 October 2020	Compilation episode – "The Best Bits from Series 15"			—N/a
193	15x11	17 December 2020	Christmas Special			—N/a

=== Road Trip: Loch Ness to London ===
No.	Episode	First broadcast
194	LLx01	8 April 2021
195	LLx02	15 April 2021
196	LLx03	22 April 2021
197	LLx04	29 April 2021
198	LLx05	6 May 2021
199	LLx06	13 May 2021

=== Series 16 ===
No.	Episode	First broadcast	Freddie's guests	Jamie's guests	Scores
200	16x01	19 August 2021	Laura Woods; George North	Maisie Adam; Tom Davis	9–11
201	16x02	26 August 2021	Jimmy Carr; Jamie Vardy	Chelcee Grimes; Kerry Godliman	9–8
202	16x03	2 September 2021	Micah Richards; Katarina Johnson-Thompson	Josh Taylor; Maisie Adam	12–8
203	16x04	9 September 2021	Jo Brand; Catherine Bohart	Ashley Cole; Nish Kumar	21–20
204	16x05	16 September 2021	Chris Ramsey; Kadeena Cox	Teddy Sheringham; Sue Perkins	18–12
205	16x06	23 September 2021	**Alan Carr** †; Josh Widdicombe; Denise Lewis	**Jimmy Carr** †; Andrew Johnston; Kerry Godliman	11–12
206	16x07	30 September 2021	**Roisin Conaty** † (Note: Flintoff and Redknapp were in self isolation but participated in the entire show via video link.); AJ Odudu; Alex Brooker	**Tom Allen** †; Troy Deeney; Geoff Norcott	18–11
207	16x08	7 October 2021	**David Walliams** †; Joel Dommett; Kelly Somers	**Jonathan Ross** †; Joe Marler; Shanthi Ranganathan	7–9
208	16x09	14 October 2021	Compilation episode – "The Unseen Bits from Series 16"		—N/a
209	16x10	21 October 2021	Compilation episode – "The Best Bits from Series 16"		—N/a
209	16x11	13 December 2021	Christmas Special		—N/a

=== Road Trip: Dingle to Dover ===
No.	Episode	First broadcast
210	DDx01	7 April 2022
211	DDx02	14 April 2022
212	DDx03	21 April 2022
213	DDx04	28 April 2022
214	DDx05	5 May 2022
215	DDx06	12 May 2022

=== Series 17 ===
No.	Episode	First broadcast	Guest and Micah's guests	Jamie's guests	Scores
216	17x01	18 August 2022	**Declan Rice** †; Josh Widdicombe	Jo Brand; Jordan North	19–18
217	17x02	25 August 2022	**Gary Neville** †; Dara Ó Briain	Katherine Ryan; Joel Dommett	15–6
218	17x03	1 September 2022	**Laura Kenny** †; Jimmy Carr	Maisie Adam; Joel Dommett	10–9
219	17x04	8 September 2022	**Aaron Ramsdale** †; Emily Atack	Michael Sheen; Alex Brooker	10–6
220	17x05	15 September 2022	**Kyle Walker** †; Maisie Adam	David Walliams; Russell Howard	12–4
221	17x06	22 September 2022	**Patrice Evra** †; Jimmy Carr	Angela Scanlon; Richard Ayoade	13–11
222	17x07	29 September 2022	**Eve Muirhead** †; Joel Dommett	Nish Kumar; Tom Davis	8–12
223	17x08	6 October 2022	**Michail Antonio** †; Jonathan Ross	Hannah Waddingham; Guz Khan	10–14
224	17x09	13 October 2022	Compilation episode – "The Unseen Bits from Series 17"		—N/a
225	17x10	20 October 2022	Compilation episode – "The Best Bits from Series 17"		—N/a
226	17x11	12 December 2022	Christmas Special		—N/a

=== Road Trip: Southeast Asia ===
No.	Episode	First broadcast
227	SAx01	17 February 2023
228	SAx02	24 February 2023
229	SAx03	3 March 2023
230	SAx04	10 March 2023
231	SAx05	17 March 2023
232	SAx06	24 March 2023

=== Series 18 ===
No.	Episode	First broadcast	Jill and Micah's guest	Jamie and Mo's guest	Scores
233	18x01	25 October 2023	Katherine Ryan	Gareth Bale	9–12
234	18x02	1 November 2023	Maisie Adam	James Maddison	6–9
235	18x03	8 November 2023	Mary Earps	Guz Khan	5–4
236	18x04	15 November 2023	Alex Brooker	Christian Horner	9–3
237	18x05	22 November 2023	Big Zuu	Daniel Sturridge	13–9
238	18x06	29 November 2023	Tom Davis	Stuart Broad	10–15
239	18x07	6 December 2023	Jimmy Carr	Maisie Adam	11–7
240	18x08	13 December 2023	Rob Beckett	Patrice Evra	7–3
241	18x09	18 December 2023	Compilation episode – "The Unseen Bits from Series 18"		—N/a
242	18x10	27 December 2023	Compilation episode – "The Best Bits from Series 18"		—N/a

=== Mexican Road Trip ===
No.	Episode	First broadcast
243	MXx01	21 May 2024
244	MXx02	28 May 2024
245	MXx03	4 June 2024
246	MXx04	11 June 2024
247	MXx05	18 June 2024
248	MXx06	25 June 2024

=== Series 19 ===
No.	Episode	First broadcast	Jill and Micah's guest	Jamie's guests	Scores
249	19x01	9 January 2025	Maya Jama	Tyson Fury; Rob Beckett	4–8
250	19x02	16 January 2025	Tom Davis	Luke Littler; Alex Brooker	13–13
251	19x03	23 January 2025	Danny Dyer	Jorginho; Rob Beckett	(Note: The red team were announced as winners, but no score was shown.)
252	19x04	30 January 2025	Andy Murray	Keely Hodgkinson; Alan Carr	9–6
253	19x05	6 February 2025	Kevin Bridges	Ollie Watkins; Maisie Adam	9–6
254	19x06	13 February 2025	Maisie Adam	Anthony Gordon; Big Zuu	5–7
255	19x07	20 February 2025	Sean Dyche	Tony Bellew; Alan Carr	9–8

=== The Rally ===
No.	Episode	First broadcast
256	RAx01	25 March 2025
257	RAx02	1 April 2025
258	RAx03	8 April 2025

=== Series 20 ===
No.	Episode	First broadcast	Jill and Micah's guest	Jamie's guests	Scores
259	20x01	12 November 2025	Maya Jama	Wayne Rooney; Alex Brooker	7–12
260	20x02	19 November 2025	Tom Davis	Paddy Pimblett; Josh Widdicombe	8–9
261	20x03	26 November 2025	Chris McCausland	Chloe Kelly; Alex Brooker	13–7
262	20x04	3 December 2025	Maisie Adam	Dan Burn; Patrice Evra	8–9
263	20x05	10 December 2025	Tom Davis	Harry Maguire; Jon Richardson	9–10
264	20x06	17 December 2025	Tony Bellew	Laura Kenny; Big Zuu	7–5

== Scores ==
Freddie	Guests	Jill	Jamie
Series wins (5 drawn)
11			4
9	1	1	4
Episode wins (17 drawn)
78			66
62	6	10	66
