= John Bishop: In Conversation With... =

British TV series (2016–2018)

- Genre: Talk show
- Presented by: John Bishop
- Country of origin: United Kingdom
- No. of series: 4
- No. of episodes: 41

Production
- Production location: Hospital Club
- Running time: 60 minutes (inc. adverts)
- Production company: Lola Entertainment

Original release
- Network: W
- Release: 1 September 2016 – 6 September 2018

Related
- The John Bishop Show; Life Stories

John Bishop: In Conversation With... is a British talk show hosted by comedian and actor John Bishop. It first aired on British television channel W on 1 September 2016.

The second series of 10 episodes aired from 16 March 2017 and the third series began on 14 September 2017. A fourth series was commissioned in November 2017 and began on 5 July 2018.

== Format ==
The series features Bishop meeting with a celebrity guest and having an intimate conversation with them in front of a live studio audience.

== Production ==
The show is filmed at The Hospital Club in London.

The series was commissioned on 1 March 2016. A further three series of the show have been made.

== Series overview ==
Series	Episodes	Originally released	
Series	Episodes	First released	Last released
1	10	1 September 2016	10 November 2016
2	10	16 March 2017	18 May 2017
3	11	14 September 2017	23 November 2017
4	10	5 July 2018	6 September 2018

== Episodes ==
=== Series 1 (2016) ===
No. overall	No. in series	Title	Original release date	UK viewers (millions)
1	1	"John Bishop: In Conversation with James Corden"	1 September 2016	0.72
2	2	"John Bishop: In Conversation with Charlotte Church"	8 September 2016	0.31
3	3	"John Bishop: In Conversation with Steve Coogan"	15 September 2016	0.34
4	4	"John Bishop: In Conversation with Alex Brooker"	22 September 2016	0.31
5	5	"John Bishop: In Conversation with Kirsty Young"	29 September 2016	0.19
6	6	"John Bishop: In Conversation with Freddie Flintoff"	6 October 2016	0.33
7	7	"John Bishop: In Conversation with Lenny Henry"	13 October 2016	0.40
8	8	"John Bishop: In Conversation with Jo Brand"	20 October 2016	0.33
9	9	"John Bishop: In Conversation with Rupert Everett"	3 November 2016	0.16
10	10	"John Bishop: In Conversation with Miriam Margolyes"	10 November 2016	0.25

=== Series 2 (2017) ===
No. overall	No. in series	Title	Original release date	UK viewers (millions)
11	1	"John Bishop: In Conversation with Lindsay Lohan"	16 March 2017	0.13
12	2	"John Bishop: In Conversation with Olly Murs"	23 March 2017	N/A
13	3	"John Bishop: In Conversation with Russell Brand"	30 March 2017	0.20
14	4	"John Bishop: In Conversation with Louise Redknapp"	6 April 2017	0.19
15	5	"John Bishop: In Conversation with Ken Loach"	13 April 2017	N/A
16	6	"John Bishop: In Conversation with Davina McCall"	20 April 2017	N/A
17	7	"John Bishop: In Conversation with Ellie Simmonds"	27 April 2017	0.15
18	8	"John Bishop: In Conversation with Jason Manford"	4 May 2017	0.27
19	9	"John Bishop: In Conversation with Meera Syal"	11 May 2017	0.09
20	10	"John Bishop: In Conversation with Anna Friel"	18 May 2017	0.13

=== Series 3 (2017) ===
No. overall	No. in series	Title	Original release date	UK viewers (millions)
21	1	"John Bishop: In Conversation with...David Walliams"	14 September 2017	0.27
22	2	"John Bishop: In Conversation with...Nadiya Hussain"	21 September 2017	0.12
23	3	"John Bishop: In Conversation with...Jimmy Carr"	28 September 2017	0.18
24	4	"John Bishop: In Conversation with...Craig Charles"	5 October 2017	0.19
25	5	"John Bishop: In Conversation with...Melanie C"	12 October 2017	0.20
26	6	"John Bishop: In Conversation with...John Cleese"	19 October 2017	0.12
27	7	"John Bishop: In Conversation with...Katie Price"	26 October 2017	0.19
28	8	"John Bishop: In Conversation with...Samantha Womack"	2 November 2017	0.16
29	9	"John Bishop: In Conversation with...Dame Joan Collins"	9 November 2017	0.13
30	10	"John Bishop: In Conversation with...Professor Brian Cox"	16 November 2017	0.19
31	11	"John Bishop: In Conversation with...Jeremy Corbyn"	23 November 2017	0.17

=== Series 4 (2018) ===
No. overall	No. in series	Title	Original release date	UK viewers (millions)
32	1	"John Bishop: In Conversation with...Professor Green"	5 July 2018	N/A
33	2	"John Bishop: In Conversation with...Ruth Jones"	12 July 2018	N/A
34	3	"John Bishop: In Conversation with...Paddy McGuinness"	19 July 2018	N/A
35	4	"John Bishop: In Conversation with...Katherine Ryan"	26 July 2018	N/A
36	5	"John Bishop: In Conversation with...Brendan Cole"	2 August 2018	N/A
37	6	"John Bishop: In Conversation with... Will Young"	9 August 2018	N/A
38	7	"John Bishop: In Conversation with...Cuba Gooding Jr."	16 August 2018	N/A
39	8	"John Bishop: In Conversation with...Alesha Dixon"	23 August 2018	N/A
40	9	"John Bishop: In Conversation with...Gabby Logan"	30 August 2018	N/A
41	10	"John Bishop: In Conversation with...Martine McCutcheon"	6 September 2018	N/A
