= Rich Peppiatt =

Irish journalist, screenwriter, and film director

- Born: Rich Peppiatt; Staines, England, United Kingdom
- Citizenship: Ireland
- Occupations: Writer; director
- Years active: 2012–present
- Notable work: Kneecap

Rich Peppiatt is an English-born Irish writer and director. best known for films Kneecap and One Rogue Reporter.

He received nominations in four categories at the 78th British Academy Film Awards for Kneecap, including Outstanding Debut by a British Writer, Director or Producer, despite being an Irish, not British, citizen. He was nominated in six categories of the 78th British Academy Film Awards for Kneecap, making him the most nominated debut director in the awards’ history. Despite being Irish, not British, he won the BAFTA for Outstanding Debut by a British Writer, Director or Producer. He was awarded Best Director at the 2025 Irish Film and Television Awards, Best Debut Screenwriter at the British Independent Film Awards, and Breakthrough British/Irish filmmaker at the London Film Critics' Circle Awards.

== Career ==
After graduating from the University of Warwick, Peppiatt worked as a journalist across a number of national newspapers in UK. He first came to prominence in 2011 when his resignation letter to Daily Star proprietor Richard Desmond, accusing the paper of Islamophobia and unethical journalism, went viral when it was leaked to The Guardian. He became a prominent critic of tabloid behaviour, giving evidence at the Leveson Inquiry into Press Ethics.

=== One Rogue Reporter ===
Peppiatt turned his experiences as a journalist and fallout from his resignation into a stand-up comedy show titled One Rogue Reporter which premiered at the 2012 Edinburgh Festival Fringe, described as "hilariously turning the tables on the tabloid power players, testing the public’s right to know to its eye-opening extremity." After Edinburgh the show toured across the UK, finishing with a run at London's Soho Theatre.

The stage show was transformed into a documentary One Rogue Reporter, starring Hugh Grant, Steve Coogan and John Bishop. It premiered at Sheffield DocFest in 2014 and was nominated for Best Independent Feature at the National Film Awards UK.

=== Short films ===
In 2018, Peppiatt released two short films titled Backseat Driver and Grounded. Grounded was long-listed for the 2020 Academy Awards.

=== Television ===
Peppiatt was the writer and occasional director of five seasons Channel 4’s satirical consumer affairs show Supershoppers. He was writer of season five of Channel 4’s Tricks of the Restaurant Trade.

=== Kneecap ===
In 2024 Peppiatt wrote and directed his first narrative feature film Kneecap, about the rise of the Belfast-based hip-hop group Kneecap. The film stars the band members as themselves, as well as Michael Fassbender. The idea for a film was first conceived in 2019 when Peppiatt watched the group perform in Belfast. He went on to shoot the music video for their track “Guilty Conscience”.

The film premiered at the 2024 Sundance Film Festival, winning the NEXT Audience Award. It was released worldwide in August 2024 claiming the biggest Irish weekend opening ever for Irish language film. At the 2024 Galway Film Fleadh, Kneecap won three main prizes: Best Irish Film, Best Irish Language Film and Audience Award. It is the first film in the 36-year history of the festival to do so.

The film won seven awards at the 2024 British Independent Film Awards, including Best British Independent Film, four awards at the Irish Film and Television Awards, and a BAFTA. Kneecap was shortlisted as Ireland's entry for the 2025 Academy Awards, but failed to earn a nomination.

== Filmography ==
Documentary film

Year	Title	Director	Writer	Producer
2014	One Rogue Reporter	Yes	Yes	Yes
2018	Who Killed the KLF?	No	No	Executive

Short film

Year	Title	Director	Writer	Producer
2017	Hutching Up	Yes	Yes	Yes
2018	Grounded	Yes	Yes	Yes
2018	Backseat Driver	Yes	Yes	Yes

Feature film

Year	Title	Director	Writer
2024	Kneecap	Yes	Yes

Television

Year	Title	Director	Writer	Producer	Notes
2016–2018	Supershoppers	Yes	Yes	Yes	
2019	Tricks of the Restaurant Trade	No	Yes	No	5 episodes

== Accolades ==
Award	Year	Category	Work	Result	Ref.
British Independent Film Awards	2024	Best British Independent Film	Kneecap	Won	
British Independent Film Awards	2024	Best Director	Kneecap	Nominated	
British Independent Film Awards	2024	Best Screenplay	Kneecap	Nominated	
British Independent Film Awards	2024	Douglas Hickox Award (Best Debut Director)	Kneecap	Nominated	
British Independent Film Awards	2024	Best Debut Screenwriter	Kneecap	Won	
European Film Awards	2024	European Discovery – Prix FIPRESCI	Kneecap	Nominated	
European Film Awards	2024	European University Film Award	Kneecap	Nominated	
Galway Film Fleadh	2024	Best Irish Film	Kneecap	Won	
Galway Film Fleadh	2024	Best Irish Language Film	Kneecap	Won	
Galway Film Fleadh	2024	Audience Award	Kneecap	Won	
South by Southwest	2024	Audience Award	Kneecap	Nominated	
Sundance Film Festival	2024	NEXT Audience Award	Kneecap	Won	
Sydney Film Festival	2024	Best Film	Kneecap	Nominated	
Irish Film and Television Academy Awards	2025	Best Film	Kneecap	Nominated	
Irish Film and Television Academy Awards	2025	Best Director	Kneecap	Won	
Irish Film and Television Academy Awards	2025	Best Script	Kneecap	Nominated	
British Academy of Film and Television Awards	2025	Best Film Not In The English Language	Kneecap	Nominated	
British Academy of Film and Television Awards	2025	Best Original Screenplay	Kneecap	Nominated	
British Academy of Film and Television Awards	2025	Outstanding British Film	Kneecap	Nominated	
British Academy of Film and Television Awards	2025	Outstanding Debut by a British Writer, Director or Producer	Kneecap	Won	
