= Wisdom of the crowd (disambiguation) =

Wisdom of the crowd is the collective perception of a group of people.

Wisdom of the crowd may also refer to:

- The Wisdom of Crowds, a book by James Surowiecki
- Wisdom of the Crowd, an American TV drama series
- Wisdom of the Crowd (game show), a British TV game show
- The Wisdom of Crowds, a book of The Age of Madness trilogy by Joe Abercrombie
