= The John Bishop Show (2022 TV series) =

British chat show on ITV

- Also known as: The John Bishop End Of Year Show
- Genre: Comedy
- Presented by: John Bishop
- Theme music composer: Paul Farrer
- Country of origin: United Kingdom
- Original language: English
- No. of series: 2
- No. of episodes: 13

Production
- Running time: 45 minutes (including commercial breaks)
- Production companies: Lola Entertainment; So Television

Original release
- Network: ITV
- Release: 8 January 2022 – 18 February 2023

Related
- The John Bishop Show (2015)

The John Bishop Show is a British comedy chat show presented by comedian John Bishop. The show aired on ITV in the UK, and Virgin Media One in Ireland from January 2022 until February 2023.

The show is co-produced by Lola Entertainment, which also produced the 2015 series of the same name for BBC One.

ITV confirmed that the show had been recommissioned for a second series in 2023, which was preceded by an end of the year special in December 2022.

On 28 February 2025, it was announced that the show had been cancelled after two series.

== Series overview ==
Series	Start date	End date	Episodes
1	8 January 2022	12 February 2022	6
2	29 December 2022	18 February 2023	7

== Episodes ==
No.		Date	Guests
1	1	8 January 2022	Sarah Millican, James Nesbitt
1	2	15 January 2022	Michelle Keegan, Bill Bailey
1	3	22 January 2022	Oti Mabuse, Rob Brydon
1	4	29 January 2022	Maya Jama, Jason Manford
1	5	5 February 2022	Courteney Cox, Hugh Bonneville
1	6	12 February 2022	Katherine Ryan, James Blunt
2	1	29 December 2022	Kirsty Young, Ian McKellen, Mandip Gill and Jill Scott
2	2	7 January 2023	Mel C, Guz Khan and Harry Hill
2	3	14 January 2023	Tom Allen, Mo Gilligan and Sue Perkins
2	4	21 January 2023	Gabby Logan and Judi Love
2	5	28 January 2023	Stephen Mangan and AJ Odudu
2	6	4 February 2023	Roisin Conaty, Craig David and Richard E. Grant
2	7	18 February 2023	Ashley Banjo, Fay Ripley and Shania Twain
