= The John Bishop Show (2015 TV series) =

- Also known as: The Christmas Show
- Genre: Comedy
- Presented by: John Bishop
- Country of origin: United Kingdom
- Original language: English
- No. of series: 1
- No. of episodes: 8

Production
- Running time: 45 minutes
- Production company: Lola Entertainment

Original release
- Network: BBC One
- Release: 30 May – 18 July 2015

Related
- John Bishop's Britain; John Bishop's Christmas Show (2013–2015); The John Bishop Show (ITV)

The Christmas Show, formerly known as The John Bishop Show, is a British comedy-variety show presented by stand-up comedian John Bishop at the Hackney Empire Theatre. The show has aired on BBC One from 30 May to 18 July 2015.

Another show, also titled The John Bishop Show began on ITV in January 2022.

== Episodes ==
No.	Date	Guests
1	30 May 2015	Paul Weller, Trevor Noah, James Acaster, Felicity Ward & Beardyman
2	6 June 2015	Jessie Ware, Striking Matches, Chris Ramsey, Zoe Lyons, Funmbi Omotayo, the cast of Riverdance & The Boy With Tape On His Face
3	13 June 2015	Florence + the Machine, Tom Stade, Ellie Taylor, Phil Wang, Parkour Generations & Pete Firman
4	20 June 2015	The Vaccines, The Overtones, Vikki Stone, Hal Cruttenden, Tanyalee Davis, Spark Fire Dance, Jimeoin & Brian Cox
5	27 June 2015	Leona Lewis, Lee Nelson, Alex Edelman, Luisa Omielan, Marcel Lucont, The Tiller Girls & The Courteeners
6	4 July 2015	Rita Ora, James Bay, Nina Conti, Glenn Wool, Nish Kumar & Myra Dubois
7	11 July 2015	Seann Walsh, Doc Brown, Jamali Maddix, Jack Savoretti, Texas, Meow Meow & Cirque Bijou
8	18 July 2015	Andy Askins, Briefs, Jason Byrne, Jo Caulfield, John Newman, Daniel Sloss & Andreya Triana

== John Bishop's Christmas Show ==
#	Date	Guests
1	23 December 2013	Jason Manford, Nina Conti, Simon Brodkin, David O'Doherty, Tim Vine, Olly Murs & Ellie Goulding
2	22 December 2014	Jack Whitehall, Jason Byrne, Alexis Dubus, Alex Horne, Katherine Ryan, Simon Webbe, George Ezra, Olly Murs & Ella Henderson
3	21 December 2015	Sarah Millican, Tom Allen, Andy Askins, Danny Bhoy, Kylie Minogue, Ian Rush, Jess Glynne & Olly Murs
