= Game On! (2020 game show) =

2020 American game show

- Genre: Game show
- Based on: A League of Their Own by Sky One
- Presented by: Keegan-Michael Key
- Starring: Venus Williams; Rob Gronkowski; Bobby Lee; Ian Karmel
- Country of origin: United States
- Original language: English
- No. of seasons: 1
- No. of episodes: 8

Production
- Executive producers: Ben Winston; James Corden; Emma Conway; David Taylor; Murray Boland; Danielle Lux; Richard Brown; Rob Gronkowski; Elle Key; Keegan-Michael Key; Henry Penzi; Venus Williams
- Production companies: Fulwell 73; CPL Productions; CBS Television Studios

Original release
- Network: CBS
- Release: May 27 – July 22, 2020

Game On! is an American sports-based comedy game show that aired on CBS from May 27 to July 22, 2020. It is hosted by Keegan-Michael Key and stars tennis player Venus Williams and American football player Rob Gronkowski with comedians Bobby Lee and Ian Karmel as they captain two teams of three competitors competing in a series of challenges.

The show is an American adaptation of the British series A League of Their Own. It is executive produced by James Corden, who has served as a host of the British version.

== Episodes and ratings ==
No.	Guests	Original release date	Viewers (millions)	Rating/share (18–49)
1	Gabriel Iglesias and J.R. Smith	May 27, 2020	4.44	0.7/4
2	Demi Lovato and Ronda Rousey	June 3, 2020	3.75	0.6/4
3	James Corden and Landon Donovan	June 10, 2020	3.52	0.5/3
4	Nicole Byer and David Ortiz	June 17, 2020	3.25	0.6/4
5	Tony Hale and Bobby Moynihan	June 24, 2020	2.94	0.4/3
6	Becky Lynch and Joel McHale	July 1, 2020	3.21	0.6/4
7	Tiki Barber and Ken Jeong	July 15, 2020	2.33	0.3/2
8	Kevin Nealon and Terrell Owens	July 22, 2020	2.21	0.3/2
