= One Rogue Reporter =

- Directed by: Tom Jenkinson; Rich Peppiatt
- Produced by: Tom Jenkinson; Rich Peppiatt
- Edited by: Chris Atkins; Tom Jenkinson; David Milkins
- Music by: Nick Norton Smith
- Production company: Naughty Step
- Distributed by: FilmBuff; Kino Lorber
- Release date: 2014
- Running time: 61 minutes
- Country: United Kingdom
- Language: English

One Rogue Reporter is a 2014 satirical documentary directed by Rich Peppiatt and Tom Jenkinson and starring Hugh Grant, Steve Coogan and Owen Jones, among others.

The film follows the real-life story of Peppiatt as he quits his job as a tabloid newspaper reporter over ethical concerns, leaking his caustic resignation letter to The Guardian. After giving evidence to the Leveson Inquiry into press ethics, Peppiatt decides to conduct a number of comedy stunts on prominent UK media figures, such as editor of MailOnline Martin Clarke, Hugh Whittow of the Daily Express, Paul Dacre of the Daily Mail, Neville Thurlbeck and former editor of The Sun, Kelvin Mackenzie.

The film premiered at the Sheffield Doc/Fest in 2014.

The documentary evolved from a stand-up comedy show, also called One Rogue Reporter, that Peppiatt performed at the 2012 Edinburgh Festival Fringe which he then toured the UK.

The film had its UK theatrical release on 7 November 2014 and was released digitally worldwide on 9 December 2014 by US based distributor FilmBuff. It was reviewed by a variety of different outlets, including The Independent and Little White Lies. On 12 January 2015 the film was nominated for Best Independent Feature at the National Film Awards.

== Cast ==
- Rich Peppiatt
- Hugh Grant
- Chris Bryant
- Steve Coogan
- John Bishop
- Nick Davies
- A.C. Grayling
- Roy Greenslade
- Owen Jones
- Max Mosley
- John Prescott
- Joan Smith
- Kate Smurthwaite
