= Vikki Stone =

British comedian

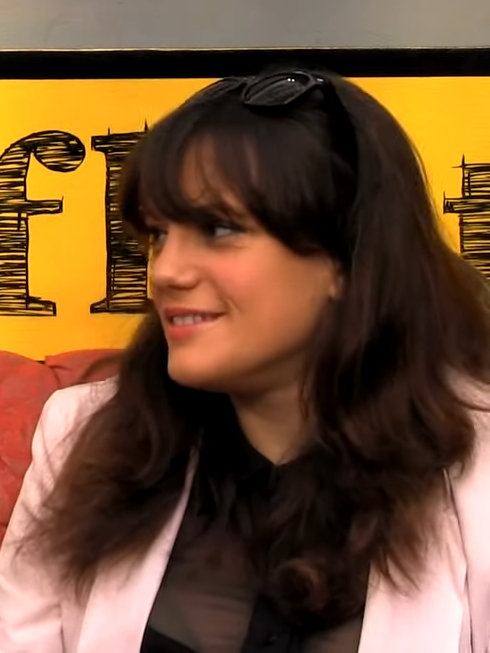
- Stone in 2012
- Born: 15 April 1983 (age 43); Rugby, Warwickshire, England
- Education: Rugby High School for Girls, Wells Cathedral School, Royal Academy of Music
- Occupations: Composer, comedian, actor
- Notable work: #ZoologicalSociety musical The John Bishop Show "The Thing That Matters" – a commission by the National Youth Choirs of Great Britain
- Honours: Associate of the Royal Academy of Music
- Website: www.vikkistone.com

Vikki Stone is a British writer, composer, lyricist, comedian, actress and musician. In 2023, her show Hey Duggee Live was awarded the Laurence Olivier Award for Best Family Show.

== Early life ==
Stone was born in Rugby, Warwickshire, attending Eastlands Primary school and then Rugby High School for Girls. She won a flute scholarship to attend Wells Cathedral School for the sixth form. In 1997, she became a flautist for the National Children's Orchestra.

From 1999–2001, she was a member of the National Youth Music Theatre, performing in various productions. Later training was as an actor/musician at Rose Bruford College, and then a postgraduate at the Royal Academy of Music. In 2013, Stone was awarded a Foundation Fellowship from Wells Cathedral School, and in 2015, was made an Associate of the Royal Academy Of Music (ARAM).

== Television ==
She has appeared as a comedian on The John Bishop Show (BBC One; 2015), Richard Hammond's Secret Service (BBC One), I'm a Celebrity...Get Me Out of Here! NOW! (ITV2), Dara Ó Briain: School of Hard Sums (Dave), It Was Alright in The 70s (Channel 4), Celebrity Bigmouths (Channel 5), Greatest Ever 3D Moments (Channel 4), 50 Funniest Moments of 2014 (Channel 4), Britain in Bed (BBC Three), Most Annoying People (BBC Three), The Hour (STV), FlashPrank (MTV), That Sunday Night Show (ITV) and This Morning (ITV). She narrated the second series of Impractical Jokers UK for BBC Three in 2014.

Following a spoof "How To" look like Hilary Devey sketch that gained popularity after the real Hilary Devey became a fan of the impression, Stone appeared in BBC Two 's The Hilary Devey Story, performing as Hilary.

Stone released "The Phillip Schofield Song", in which Phillip Schofield plays a cameo of himself, where he talks to Stone through the television from the This Morning set. Following the success of the video, Stone performed the song live on ITV1 to Schofield on This Morning.

She also plays the character Miss Dotty in the CBBC show Titch & Ted.

== Radio ==
Stone has appeared a number of times on BBC Radio 4, most notably her appearances on The Now Show, Live at The Fringe and Live at The Stand. Throughout 2014, Stone hosted her own radio show, The Friday Night Show with Vikki Stone, on Fubar Radio.

Stone presents the BBC Radio 3 Proms Unplucked podcasts, covering the 2016 and 2017 Proms seasons.

== Compositions ==
- 2015 – The Night Before Christmas – a choral work written with poet Luke Wright
- 2015 – CBBC for BBC Learning's Titch and Ted – theme tune and songs
- 2016 – The Thing That Matters – commissioned by the National Youth Choirs Of Great Britain – world premier at the Royal Albert Hall
- 2017 – Stone's debut orchestral work The Concerto for Comedian and Orchestra, which was supported by the Arts Council England and a PRS Bliss Trust composer's bursary premiered at the Glastonbury festival in June 2017.

== Shows ==
In August 2011, Stone performed her Edinburgh debut show Big Neon Letters. Kate Copstick giving four stars in The Scotsman wrote “really very good stand-up, and she delivers quite a punch...cleverly constructed stuff with some terrific one-liners, smart little callbacks woven into not just the chat, but the songs too. She is a woman to watch, I suspect. Those big neon letters cannot be far away”.

In 2012, her second show Hot Mess sold out for the entirety of the festival, with extra shows added due to demand, again receiving positive reviews. In 2013, this show also transferred to Soho Theatre. In June 2013, Stone performed her full-length show at London's Southbank Centre, as part of the Udderbelly Festival. In August 2013, her third show, "Definitely", opened at the Edinburgh Comedy Festival, followed by her first national UK tour.

In 2014, she launched her fourth show Instrumental, and was her most personal and technically challenging to date. Focusing on her life as a musician and her father's struggle with alcoholism, she set herself the challenge to play twenty different instruments throughout the performance. Steve Bennett in Chortle describing it as "a lovely show, playful and happy with a good heart and an irresistible energy, neatly tied together and guaranteed to please. It’s easily Stone’s best show yet".

In 2023, her show Hey Duggee Live was awarded the Laurence Olivier Award for Best Family Show.

In 2025, she co-wrote and directed the pantomime Mama Goose at Theatre Royal Stratford East.

== Musicals ==
- 2019 - Stone re-adapted the musical of Nick Hornby's High Fidelity at Turbine Theatre in Battersea Power Station.
- 2020 - Aladdin for the Lyric Theatre (Hammersmith)
- 2020 - #zoologicalsociety for the Royal & Derngate, Northampton
