= Wisdom of the Crowd (game show) =

- Genre: Game show
- Created by: Dean Nabarro; Andy Auerbach
- Presented by: John Bishop
- Theme music composer: Twin Petes
- Country of origin: United Kingdom
- Original language: English
- No. of series: 1
- No. of episodes: 8

Production
- Running time: 45 minutes
- Production company: Magnum Media

Original release
- Network: BBC One
- Release: 19 September 2026 – present

Wisdom of the Crowd is a British television game show, hosted by John Bishop and airing on BBC One since 19 September 2026. Based on regression toward the mean as described by Francis Galton, the show sees contestants attempt to estimate an answer closer than the mean of the estimates of 200 audience members.

== Production ==
In January 2025, news website Chortle reported that Bishop was to host a non-broadcast television pilot for a BBC game show titled Wisdom of the Crowd. The pilot was to be produced by Magnum Media, who had made The 1% Club for ITV1. In September 2025, the series was commissioned by the BBC, as eight episodes filmed at MediaCityUK in Salford. The set was built in 48 hours, and the involvement of 200 audience members meant that each required microphones, interactive devices, and to be visible to cameras. A rehearsal took place in March 2026. On 12 September 2026, the first trailer was revealed for the show, to be broadcast seven days later.

== Gameplay ==
The series is inspired by the statistician Francis Galton, who visited a fair in Plymouth in 1906 where there was a competition to guess the weight of an ox. Of over 800 entries, the mean estimate was within 1% of the ox's actual weight. Regression toward the mean is used in politics, economics and philosophy.

A contestant must estimate an answer. If they are closer than the mean of the audience's estimate, they win £5,000. They have two more attempts to beat the audience, to win a maximum of £15,000. If they lose on their third attempt, they are eliminated and go home with nothing, while £2,500 is put in an amount to be divided between the audience members at the end. Contestants can withdraw before their third attempt and join the crowd, where their potential winnings will be less than if they won the show individually.

== Ratings ==
The first episode received an audience of 2.4 million, falling to 2.03 million for the second episode.
