= John Bishop's Britain =

British television series

- Presented by: John Bishop
- Country of origin: United Kingdom
- Original language: English
- No. of series: 2
- No. of episodes: 12 (+1 Christmas special)

Production
- Producers: Kenton Allen; Matthew Justice
- Production locations: Granada Studios (series 1) dock10 studios (series 2)
- Running time: 30 minutes (original showing); 45 minutes (extended repeats)
- Production companies: Objective Productions; 3 Amigos

Original release
- Network: BBC One
- Release: 24 July 2010 – 27 December 2011

John Bishop's Britain is a British television programme presented by comedian John Bishop. Each programme has a theme, for example food. It features stand-up, sketches and real-life stories from celebrity guests and members of the public on that particular topic. There have been two series filmed to date. A 2011 Christmas special was filmed and broadcast around the Christmas period of that year.

The show is filmed in front of an audience, where the audience are shown the interviews via video link as part of the filming. The sketches are not shown to the audience at the time of filming but Bishop's narration of the sketch is included in the filming. In the sketches, Bishop is portrayed by model Tommy Maxwell. TV host Rylan Clark-Neal rose to fame from this show.

== Episode list ==
=== Series 1 (2010) ===
| Episode No. | Airdate | Theme | Total viewers | Weekly channel ranking |
|---|---|---|---|---|
| 1 | 24 July 2010 | 'Love and Marriage' | 4.34m | 19 |
| 2 | 31 July 2010 | 'Growing Up' | 4.23m | 18 |
| 3 | 7 August 2010 | 'Sport' | 3.92m | 29 |
| 4 | 14 August 2010 | 'Work' | 4.38m | 19 |
| 5 | 21 August 2010 | 'Parenthood and Family' | 4.22m | 21 |
| 6 | 28 August 2010 | 'Holidays' | Under 4.04m | Outside top 30 |

=== Series 2 (2011) ===
| Episode No. | Airdate | Theme | Total viewers | Weekly channel ranking |
|---|---|---|---|---|
| 1 | 30 July 2011 | 'Music and Fashion' | 4.28m | 17 |
| 2 | 6 August 2011 | 'Food' | 4.56m | 16 |
| 3 | 13 August 2011 | 'Hobbies' | 4.55m | 25 |
| 4 | 20 August 2011 | 'Animals' | 4.00m | 28 |
| 5 | 27 August 2011 | 'Friends' | Under 4.04m | Outside top 30 |
| 6 | 3 September 2011 | 'Being British' | Under 3.89m | Outside top 30 |
| 7 | 27 December 2011 | 'Christmas' | Under 5.00m | Outside top 30 |
