= A League of Their Own (Australian game show) =

Australian comedy panel game

- Genre: Game show; Comedy; Entertainment
- Based on: A League of Their Own
- Presented by: Tommy Little
- Starring: Pat Cash; Eamon Sullivan
- Country of origin: Australia
- Original language: English
- No. of seasons: 1
- No. of episodes: 10

Production
- Running time: 60 minutes
- Production company: Freehand Productions

Original release
- Network: Network Ten
- Release: 16 September – 11 November 2013

Related
- British version

A League of Their Own is an Australian comedy panel game, which first aired on Network Ten on 16 September 2013. It is hosted by Tommy Little and features Pat Cash and Eamon Sullivan as team captains. The show was cancelled to immediate effect after posting a disappointing rating in the show's ninth week. The tenth episode, which never aired, is available online for viewing.

== Format ==
The show is based on the British game show of the same name. The show is a standard panel quiz show where two teams of three, compete for points awarded in three rounds, in order to find the overall winning team by points total.

- Round 1 involves both teams either having to rank three different sports persons according to a specific criterion, or match sports persons to specific criteria.
- Round 2, Battle of the Codes, involves a member from each an AFL and an NRL team go head-to-head, where as the teams must choose which party they lend their support.
- Round 3, Human Clock, sees one or two members of each team have to answer questions for as long as the other team members can sustain a physical challenge in the studio.

Often within the first round, teams have to complete short physical tasks, which are usually linked to either one of the guests on the teams or to the question they have to answer.

== Episodes ==
The coloured backgrounds denote the result of each of the shows:

– Eamon's team won
– Pat's team won

No.	Eamon's Team	Scores	Pat's Team	Original release date
1	Lauren Jackson and Lehmo	12–11	Kurt Fearnley and Peter Helliar	16 September 2013
2	Libby Trickett and Joel Creasey	10–8	Dave Hughes and Veronica Milsom	23 September 2013
3	Wendell Sailor and Lehmo	10–11	Michael O'Loughlin and Veronica Milsom	30 September 2013
4	Amanda Keller and Mitchell Watt	8–9	Alex Pullin and Peter Helliar	7 October 2013
5	Charlie Pickering and Joel Creasey	4–6	Brad Hogg and Lehmo	14 October 2013
6	Christian Sprenger and Joel Creasey	5–5 (Note: Initially a draw, Eamon's team was awarded the win after the judges gave his team more points)	Jeff Fenech and Celia Pacquola	21 October 2013
7	Ky Hurst and Joel Creasey	6–8	Libby Trickett and Lehmo	28 October 2013
8	George Calombaris and Joel Creasey	13–12	Archie Thompson and Ryan Fitzgerald	4 November 2013
9	Steven Bradbury and Peter Helliar	10–12	Joel Creasey and Lydia Lassila	11 November 2013
10	Mark Waugh and Joel Creasey	13–12	Madi Browne and Lehmo	Unaired (Note: The episode was to air on 18 November, was pulled from the schedule due to poor ratings in previous weeks.)

== Ratings ==
No.	Title	Air date	Overnight ratings		Ref(s)
No.	Title	Air date	Viewers	Rank	Ref(s)
1	Episode 1	16 September 2013	465,000	—N/a	
2	Episode 2	23 September 2013	403,000	—N/a	
3	Episode 3	30 September 2013	327,000	—N/a	
4	Episode 4	7 October 2013	353,000	—N/a	
5	Episode 5	14 October 2013	344,000	—N/a	
6	Episode 6	21 October 2013	253,000	—N/a	
7	Episode 7	28 October 2013	242,000	—N/a	
8	Episode 8	4 November 2013	326,000	—N/a	
9	Episode 9	11 November 2013	328,000	—N/a	
