= A League of Their Own (British game show) =

British sports-based television comedy panel game

- Genre: Comedy; Panel game Sports
- Presented by: James Corden; Romesh Ranganathan
- Starring: Freddie Flintoff; Jamie Redknapp; Georgie Thompson; John Bishop; Jack Whitehall; Micah Richards; Jill Scott; Mo Gilligan
- Theme music composer: Will Slater
- Country of origin: United Kingdom
- Original language: English
- No. of series: 20
- No. of episodes: 264 (list of episodes)

Production
- Production locations: Pinewood Studios (2010); BBC Elstree Centre (2011–15); Elstree Studios (2016) dock10 studios (2024–25)
- Running time: 60 mins (episode 1, series 3–20, specials); 30 mins (series 1–2)
- Production company: CPL Productions

Original release
- Network: Sky One (2010–21); Sky Max (2021–25)
- Release: 11 March 2010 – 17 December 2025

A League of Their Own is a British sports-based comedy panel game show that was first broadcast on Sky One on 11 March 2010 and concluded with its twentieth and final series on 17 December 2025. The show was hosted by Romesh Ranganathan with Jamie Redknapp and Jill Scott as team captains and Micah Richards as a regular panellist.

== Format ==
The show is a standard panel quiz show where two teams of three, the Red and Blue teams compete for points awarded in three rounds, to find the overall winning team by points total.

- Round 1 involves both teams having to rank three different sportspersons according to a specific criterion.
- Round 2, Guest List, involves both teams having to guess the answers given by a sportsperson about his or her sport.
- Round 3, The Final Challenge, formerly known as the Right Guard Challenge, sees two members of each team have to answer questions for as long as the third team member can sustain a physical challenge in the studio.

== Participants ==
The show was hosted for the first 13 series by James Corden. The Red Team is captained by former Liverpool and England footballer Jamie Redknapp, who was formerly joined by once regular panellist and stand-up comedian from Liverpool John Bishop. In series 5, Bishop was absent for several episodes due to his Sport Relief challenge, eventually leaving the show as a regular. Redknapp was joined on the red team by comedian Romesh Ranganathan for series 13 and 14. The Blue Team was captained by retired Lancashire and England cricketer Freddie Flintoff for the first 16 series. Flintoff was replaced by a series of guest captains starting from series 17. For the first four series Flintoff was joined by then Sky Sports F1 presenter Georgie Thompson. From series 5, comedian Jack Whitehall replaced Thompson as regular panellist on the blue team due to her F1 commitments. Whitehall himself left the show after series 12. Micah Richards became the blue team's regular panellist from series 17. Former England midfielder Jill Scott and comedian Mo Gilligan joined the show as the new blue team captains from series 18. Each episode the teams are supplemented by special guests.

Neither Corden, Redknapp nor Thompson had been regular features on a television panel show before. Corden was non-committal about whether the show marked a new direction for him as a television host, stating "I spend most of my time sitting in a room with my mates talking about sport anyway. To get paid to do such a thing will be great. I hope it will be a fun show and people will enjoy watching it." Redknapp said "I'm loving it, but it is nerve-wracking" and "the key is to try to have a bit of fun, but to remember that we're not comedians and can't compete with the professionals" referring to Bishop and Corden. Thompson said of the show that it was "the fun factor that I've been looking for" and represented an "exciting opportunity" in her career.

Due to Corden's commitments to his U.S. talk show The Late Late Show, the 14th series was presented, in part, by guest hosts. Corden's absence was extended into the 15th series due to the COVID-19 pandemic. This series was hosted mainly by Ranganathan with Flintoff and Redknapp hosting one episode apiece. Ranganathan was confirmed as the show's new permanent host starting from series 16.

== Production ==
The show was created by Paul Brassey, a development producer at CPL Productions. The show was recorded in Pinewood Studios (BBC Elstree Centre from series 3, and Elstree Film Studios from series 12), being filmed on Mondays and Tuesdays in front of a live studio audience. The show was commissioned by Duncan Gray, with Gray, Danielle Lux and Murray Boland acting as Executive Producers. It was announced on 20 October 2009 that the pilot for the show would be hosted by Corden alongside team captains Redknapp and England cricketer Stuart Broad, although Broad was replaced in the line up by Flintoff by the time of the series 1 start. Executive producer Danielle Lux said it would be "an Olympic standard comedy show for anyone who loves their sport and a fun-filled half-hour for those who don't." The pilot was recorded on 24 October, and was due to be aired later in 2009. Sky One's promotion for the show included a TV advert featuring Corden mis-kicking a football, spoofing contemporary serious sportswear advertising campaigns, accompanied by the tagline "the new panel show that doesn't take sport too seriously".

== Reception ==
Keith Watson of the Metro welcomed the show as a challenger to "Britain's No.1 TV sports spot-the-scripted-bits banter show", referring to the BBC's show A Question of Sport, hosted by Sue Barker. Watson, writing after the first episode, said "Team skippers Freddie Flintoff and Jamie Redknapp are just there as window-dressing/butts of jokes, for this is Corden's show and he takes to it like a puck to the ice rink. [Sue] Barker beware." Sharon Lougher and Larushka Ivan-Zadeh also of the Metro went further, announcing the show as "basically, A Question of Sport for idiots ... the televisual equivalent of Nuts magazine".

Writing after the first episode, Harry Venning of The Stage panned the show, summarising it as "Imagine A Question of Sport without the sports questions, combined with They Think It's All Over without the comedy". Criticising the length of the opening hour-long special, Venning said it contained some fine gags but not enough of them, and the format was "dull, unimaginative and painfully protracted", albeit praising Flintoff for being "surprisingly witty and charming".

The British Comedy Guide said of the first episode that "the sportsman-dominated panel showed: very few laughs, and little charm" and were not convinced of the format, although conceding that not being sports fans they might not be the target audience.

== Guest appearances ==
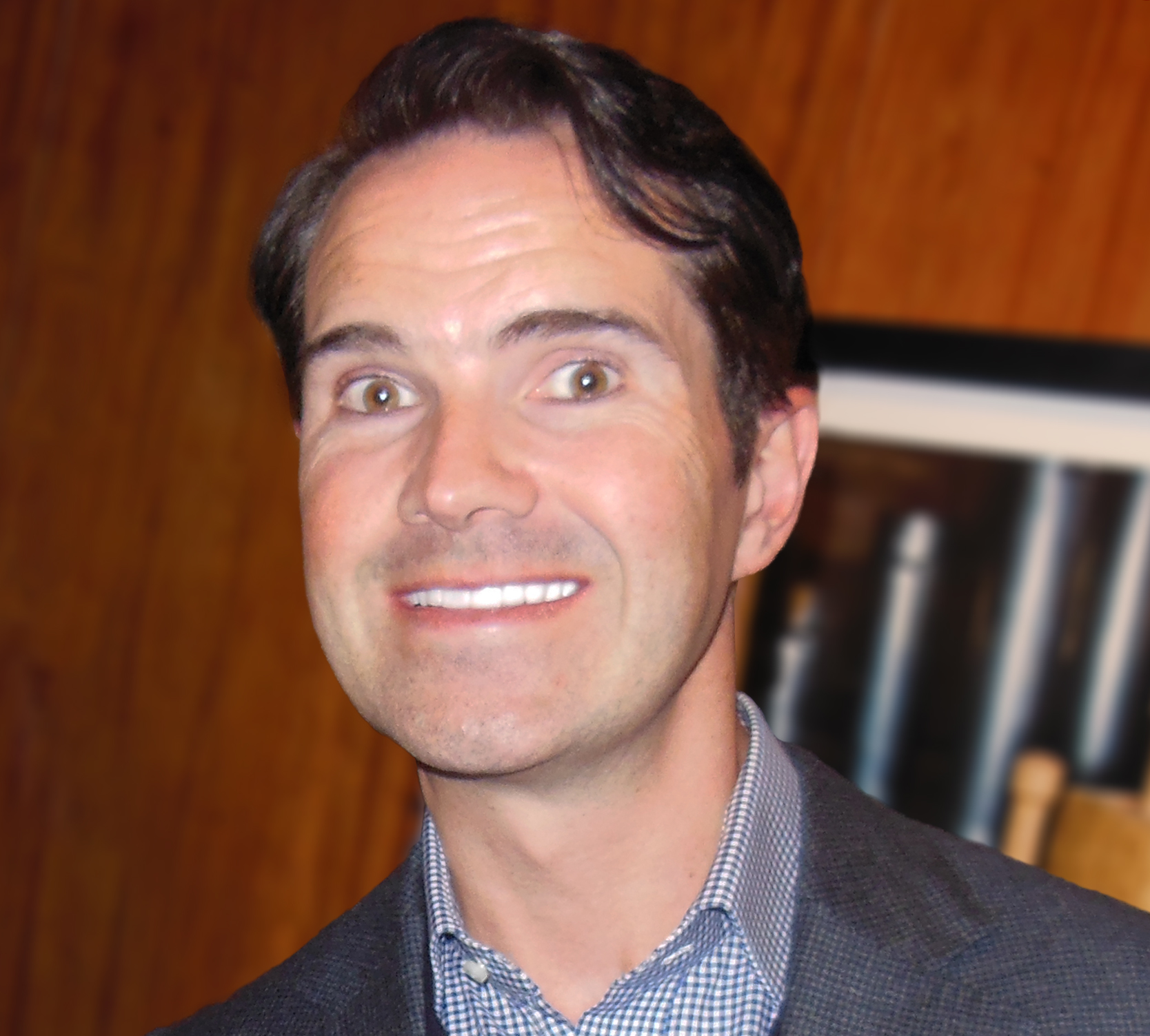
Comedian Jimmy Carr has made 24 guest appearances, making him the most frequent guest on the programme.

The following have made more than one appearance on the show as a guest (up to and including series 18, episode 8):

24 appearances

- Jimmy Carr^{[a]}

15 appearances

- Rob Beckett

12 appearances

- David Walliams^{[a]}^{[e]}

8 appearances

- Maisie Adam
- Tom Davis
- Gabby Logan^{[a]}

7 appearances

- John Bishop^{[b]}
- Alex Brooker
- Josh Widdicombe

6 appearances

- Kevin Bridges
- Alan Carr^{[a]}

5 appearances

- Tony Bellew
- Joel Dommett
- Micky Flanagan
- Romesh Ranganathan^{[d]}
- Jack Whitehall^{[c]}^{[e]}

4 appearances

- Clare Balding^{[e]}
- Roisin Conaty^{[a]}
- Jessica Ennis-Hill
- Mo Farah
- Anthony Joshua
- Lee Mack^{[f]}
- Dara Ó Briain
- Jonathan Ross^{[a]}
- Katherine Ryan
- Helen Skelton
- Claudia Winkleman

3 appearances

- Tom Allen^{[a]}
- Dina Asher-Smith
- Richard Ayoade
- Aisling Bea
- Ashley Cole
- Patrice Evra^{[a]}
- Kerry Godliman
- Amanda Holden^{[e]}
- Jenny Jones
- Guz Khan
- Frank Lampard
- Jason Manford
- Andy Murray
- Judy Murray
- Sam Quek
- Harry Redknapp
- Micah Richards^{[a]}^{[g]}
- Laura Woods

2 appearances

- Nicola Adams
- James Anderson
- Big Zuu
- Jo Brand
- Peter Crouch^{[a]}
- Sara Cox
- Tom Daley
- Noel Fielding
- Robbie Fowler
- Joe Hart
- Niall Horan
- Russell Howard
- Chris Hoy
- Maya Jama
- Katarina Johnson-Thompson
- Jade Jones
- Ruth Jones
- Laura Kenny^{[a]}
- Nish Kumar
- Christine Lampard
- Denise Lewis
- Stephen Mangan
- Neil Morrissey
- Gary Neville^{[a]}
- Dermot O'Leary^{[a]}
- Adam Peaty
- Kevin Pietersen
- Jon Richardson
- Alex Scott
- Johnny Vegas
- Heather Watson
- Amy Williams
- a. One of their appearances was as a guest team captain.
- b. Appearances made after series 5, when Bishop was no longer a regular panellist.
- c. Appearances made before Whitehall became a regular panellist.
- d. Appearances made before Ranganathan became a regular panellist or permanent host.
- e. Includes one appearance as host
- f. Two of their appearances were as a guest team captain.
- g. Appearances made before Richards became a regular panellist.

== Transmissions ==
=== Original ===
==== Series ====
Series	Start date	End date	Episodes	Presenter	Team captains		Regular panellist(s)
1	11 March 2010	13 May 2010	10	James Corden	Jamie Redknapp	Freddie Flintoff	John Bishop & Georgie Thompson
2	7 October 2010	11 November 2010	10	James Corden	Jamie Redknapp	Freddie Flintoff	John Bishop & Georgie Thompson
3	4 March 2011	29 April 2011	8	James Corden	Jamie Redknapp	Freddie Flintoff	John Bishop & Georgie Thompson
4	7 October 2011	18 November 2011	7	James Corden	Jamie Redknapp	Freddie Flintoff	John Bishop & Georgie Thompson
5	20 April 2012	8 June 2012	8	James Corden	Jamie Redknapp	Freddie Flintoff	John Bishop & Jack Whitehall
6	26 October 2012	14 December 2012	8	James Corden	Jamie Redknapp	Freddie Flintoff	Jack Whitehall
7	23 August 2013	11 October 2013	8	James Corden	Jamie Redknapp	Freddie Flintoff	Jack Whitehall
8	29 August 2014	17 October 2014	8	James Corden	Jamie Redknapp	Freddie Flintoff	Jack Whitehall
9	15 May 2015	3 July 2015	8	James Corden	Jamie Redknapp	Freddie Flintoff	Jack Whitehall
10	7 January 2016	25 February 2016	8	James Corden	Jamie Redknapp	Freddie Flintoff	Jack Whitehall
11	22 September 2016	10 November 2016	8	James Corden	Jamie Redknapp	Freddie Flintoff	Jack Whitehall
12	14 September 2017	26 October 2017	7	James Corden	Jamie Redknapp	Freddie Flintoff	Jack Whitehall
13	30 August 2018	18 October 2018	8	James Corden	Jamie Redknapp	Freddie Flintoff	Romesh Ranganathan
14	15 August 2019	3 October 2019	8	James Corden & Guest presenters	Jamie Redknapp	Freddie Flintoff	Romesh Ranganathan
15	13 August 2020	1 October 2020	8	Romesh Ranganathan	Jamie Redknapp	Freddie Flintoff	N/A
16	19 August 2021	7 October 2021	8	Romesh Ranganathan	Jamie Redknapp	Freddie Flintoff	N/A
17	18 August 2022	6 October 2022	8	Romesh Ranganathan	Jamie Redknapp	Guest team captains	Micah Richards
18	25 October 2023	13 December 2023	8	Romesh Ranganathan	Jamie Redknapp	Jill Scott	Micah Richards & Mo Gilligan
19	9 January 2025	20 February 2025	7	Romesh Ranganathan	Jamie Redknapp	Jill Scott	Micah Richards & Mo Gilligan
20	12 November 2025	17 December 2025	6	Romesh Ranganathan	Jamie Redknapp	Jill Scott	Micah Richards & Mo Gilligan

==== Specials ====
Date	Entitled
20 May 2010	The Best of Series 1
27 May 2010	The Unseen Bits from Series 1
12 November 2010	The Best of Series 2
19 December 2010	The Unseen Bits from Series 2
23 December 2010	Christmas Special
6 May 2011	The Unseen Bits from Series 3 (Part 1)
13 May 2011	The Best of Series 3 (Part 1)
20 May 2011	The Best of Series 3 (Part 2)
27 May 2011	The Unseen Bits from Series 3 (Part 2)
16 December 2011	End of Year Special
6 January 2012	The Unseen Bits from Series 4
13 January 2012	The Best of Series 4
15 June 2012	The Unseen Bits from Series 5 (Part 1)
22 June 2012	The Unseen Bits from Series 5 (Part 2)
29 June 2012	The Best of Series 5
21 December 2012	The Unseen Bits from Series 6 (Part 1)
28 December 2012	The Unseen Bits from Series 6 (Part 2)
18 October 2013	The Unseen Bits from Series 7 (Part 1)
25 October 2013	The Unseen Bits from Series 7 (Part 2)
1 November 2013	The Best of the Rally Car Special
8 November 2013	The Best of Series 7
17 October 2014	The Unseen Bits from Series 8 (Part 1)
24 October 2014	The Unseen Bits from Series 8 (Part 2)
31 October 2014	The Unseen Bits from Series 8 (Part 3)
31 October 2014	The Unseen Bits from Series 8 (Part 4)
24 December 2014	Christmas Special
10 July 2015	The Best of Series 9 (Part 1)
17 July 2015	The Best of Series 9 (Part 2)
24 July 2015	The Unseen Bits from Series 9 (Part 1)
31 July 2015	The Unseen Bits from Series 9 (Part 2)
3 March 2016	The Best of Series 10 (Part 1)
10 March 2016	The Best of Series 10 (Part 2)
17 November 2016	The Unseen Bits from Series 11
24 November 2016	The Best of Series 11
24 December 2016	Christmas Special
10 August 2017	A Premier League of Their Own
5 December 2017	The Unseen Bits from Series 12
12 December 2017	The Best of Series 12
21 December 2017	Christmas Special
25 October 2018	The Unseen Bits from Series 13
1 November 2018	The Best of Series 13
20 December 2018	Christmas Special
10 October 2019	The Unseen Bits from Series 14
17 October 2019	The Best Bits from Series 14
19 December 2019	Christmas Special
15 October 2020	The Unseen Bits from Series 15
22 October 2020	The Best Bits from Series 15
17 December 2020	Christmas Special
14 October 2021	The Unseen Bits from Series 16
21 October 2021	The Best Bits from Series 16
13 December 2021	Christmas Special
13 October 2022	The Unseen Bits from Series 17
20 October 2022	The Best Bits from Series 17
12 December 2022	Christmas Special
12 July 2023	The Lionesses Special
25 March 2025	The Rally RAx01
1 April 2025	The Rally RAx02
8 April 2025	The Rally RAx03

=== Road Trip ===
==== Series ====
Series	Start date	End date	Episodes	Area
1	10 May 2016	24 May 2016	3	USA
2	5 June 2017	26 June 2017	4	USA
3	10 January 2019	31 January 2019	4	Europe
4	9 January 2020	30 January 2020	4	Europe
5	8 April 2021	29 April 2021	4	UK^{[g]}
6	7 April 2022	28 April 2022	4	UK & Ireland^{[h]}
7	17 February 2023	10 March 2023	4	Southeast Asia
8	21 May 2024	11 June 2024	4	Mexico

- g. Series titled Loch Ness to London.
- h. Series titled Dingle to Dover.

==== Specials ====
Date	Entitle
31 May 2016	The Unseen Bits from US Road Trip
3 July 2017	The Unseen Bits from US Road Trip 2.0 (Part 1)
10 July 2017	The Unseen Bits from US Road Trip 2.0 (Part 2)
17 July 2017	The Best of US Road Trip 2.0
7 February 2019	The Unseen Bits from European Road Trip
14 February 2019	The Best of European Road Trip
6 February 2020	The Unseen Bits from European Road Trip
13 February 2020	The Best of European Road Trip
6 May 2021	The Unseen Bits from Loch Ness to London
13 May 2021	The Best of Loch Ness to London
5 May 2022	The Unseen Bits from Dingle to Dover
12 May 2022	The Best of Dingle to Dover
17 March 2023	The Unseen Bits from Southeast Asia
24 March 2023	The Best of Southeast Asia
18 June 2024	The Unseen Bits from Mexico
25 June 2024	The Best of Mexico

== International versions ==
=== Australian version ===
An Australian version of A League of Their Own aired on Network Ten on 16 September 2013. It was presented by comedian Tommy Little and the captains were tennis star Pat Cash and swimmer Eamon Sullivan. The series had ten episodes. Nine episodes were broadcast with the tenth episode being viewed online after it was cancelled to immediate effect after posting a disappointing rating in the show's ninth week.

=== Danish version ===
A Danish version of A League of Their Own aired on Kanal 5 on 7 September 2015. The Danish title is "5. Halvleg", in English: "5th half". The show is presented by comedian Carsten Bang and the captains are former professional cyclist Jesper Skibby and comedian Jesper Juhl. In the first series, there was 10 episodes, and the last aired on 5 November 2015.

The first series was very successful, with good ratings, and Kanal 5 decided to renew the show for a second series, with the premiere on 18 February 2016. The series contained 8 episodes, with the same host and captains as in series 1. The last episode of series 2 aired on 14 April 2016.

Series 2 was another successful series for Kanal 5, and they decided to renew the show for a third series, with the same host and captains as in the first two series. The first episode of series 3 aired on 4 September 2016.

Series 4 on 5 went on with the same host and captains. The first episode of series 4 aired on 12 February 2017 and the last episode aired on 22 June 2017. The first episode of series 5 aired on 2 November 2017.

Awards

Host Carsten Bang was nominated for Best Host at Zulu Awards 2016.

=== German version ===
A German version of A League of Their Own called Eine Liga für sich - Buschis Sechserkette, in English: A League of its Own - Buschi's Chain of Six aired on German TV channel Sky 1 on 13 March 2017. It is presented by sports commentator and former basketball player Frank Buschmann. Comedian Matze Knop and television host and former professional handball player Panagiota Petridou serve as captains.

=== American version ===
An American version of A League of Their Own called Game On! aired on CBS on 27 May 2020 until 22 July 2020. The show was hosted by Keegan-Michael Key with tennis champion Venus Williams and three-time Super Bowl champion Rob Gronkowski as team captains. James Corden (who hosts The Late Late Show for the network and was the presenter of the original British version) served as executive producer of the show. At the time, this version was going to be aired on 20 May before the change to 27 May.

Country	Title	Broadcaster	Presenter	Premiere	Finale
Australia	A League of Their Own	Network Ten	Tommy Little	16 September 2013	11 November 2013
Denmark	5. Halvleg	Kanal 5	Carsten Bang	7 September 2015	2017
Germany	Eine Liga für sich - Buschis Sechserkette	Sky 1	Frank Buschmann	13 March 2017	14 February 2022
Spain	Invictus, ¿te atreves?	La 1	Patricia Conde	17 June 2024	24 August 2024
United States	Game On!	CBS	Keegan-Michael Key	27 May 2020	22 July 2020
