= John Bishop =

English comedian and actor

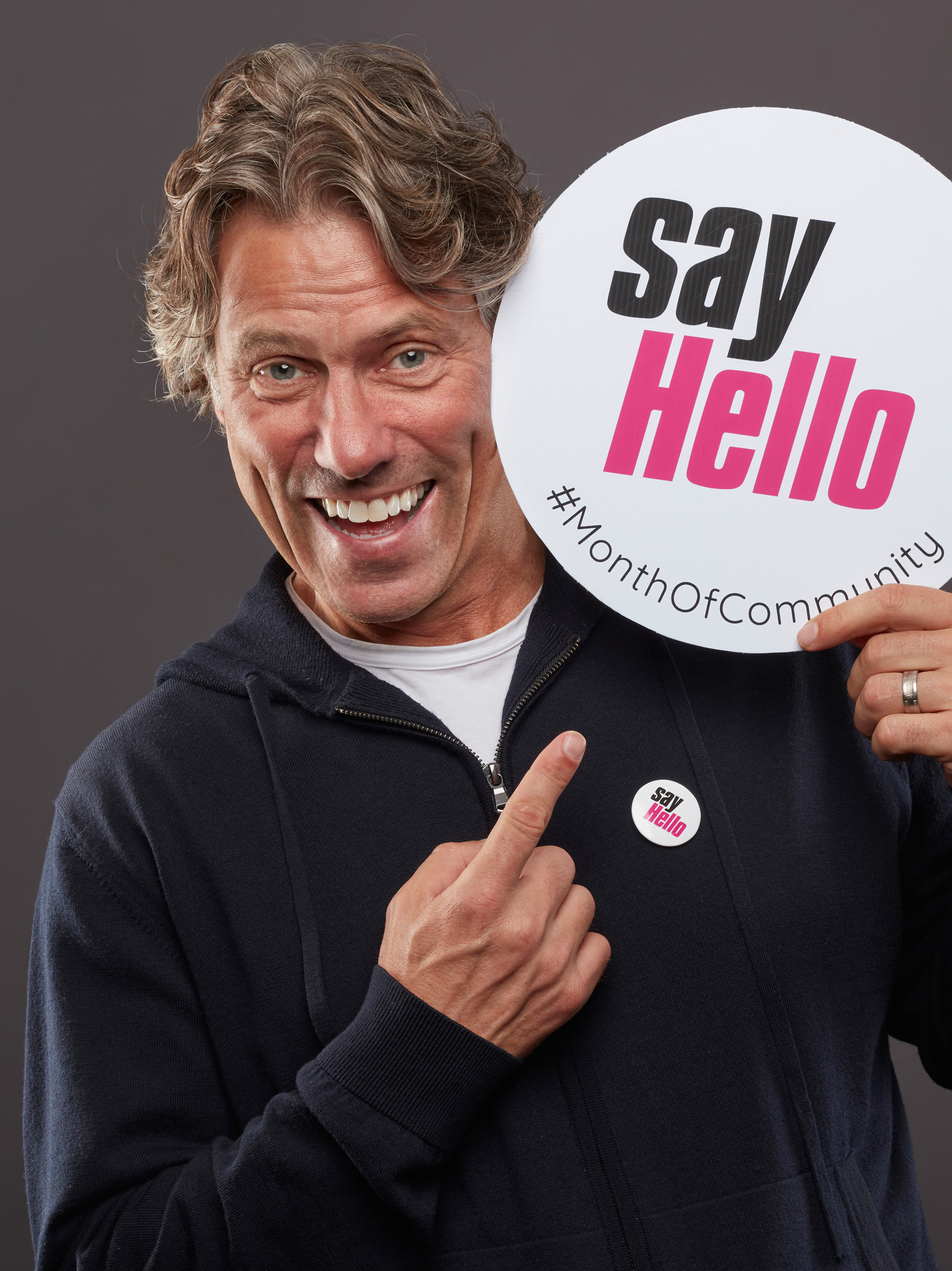
- Bishop in 2022
- Born: 30 November 1966 (age 59); Everton, Liverpool, England
- Occupations: Comedian; presenter; actor; former semi pro footballer
- Years active: 2002–present
- Spouse: Melanie Cornall Bishop (m. 1993)
- Children: 3
- Relatives: Eddie Bishop (brother)
- John Bishop's voice from the BBC programme Desert Island Discs, 24 June 2012.
- Website: johnbishoponline.com

John Bishop (born 30 November 1966) is an English comedian, presenter, actor, and former semi-professional footballer. His first television appearance was in 2007 on the RTÉ topical-comedy show The Panel, where he was a regular panelist until 2008. He subsequently appeared in series three and four of the E4 teen drama Skins and the Ken Loach film Route Irish. He has also hosted his own shows, such as John Bishop's Britain (2010–2011), John Bishop's Only Joking (2013), and two versions of The John Bishop Show (2015, 2022). He also played the companion Dan Lewis of the Thirteenth Doctor in Doctor Who from 2021 to 2022. He had a regular Sunday slot on Liverpool radio station Radio City called Bishop's Sunday Service. He is also known for his charity work, most notably raising £4.2 million for Sport Relief 2012.

Bishop formerly played football as a midfielder for Winsford United, Crewe Alexandra, Runcorn, Rhyl, Witton Albion, Hyde United, Southport, Stalybridge Celtic, Northwich Victoria, Caernarfon Town, Holywell Town and Hanley Town.

== Early life ==
John Bishop was born at Mill Road Hospital in Everton, Liverpool, on 30 November 1966 (Saint Andrew's Day), the son of housewife Kathleen (née Hackett) (d. 2023) and labourer Edward Bishop, a couple from nearby Huyton. He has an older brother, footballer Eddie, and two older sisters. He grew up mostly in the Cheshire towns of Runcorn and Winsford, attending Murdishaw West Primary School and Brookvale Comprehensive School (now known as Ormiston Bolingbroke Academy). He briefly studied English at Newcastle Polytechnic, and gained a BA in Social Science from Manchester Polytechnic. He later became a medical representative for the pharmaceutical company Syntex, where he worked until leaving in 2006 to pursue his comedy career full-time at the age of 40.

== Career ==
John Bishop
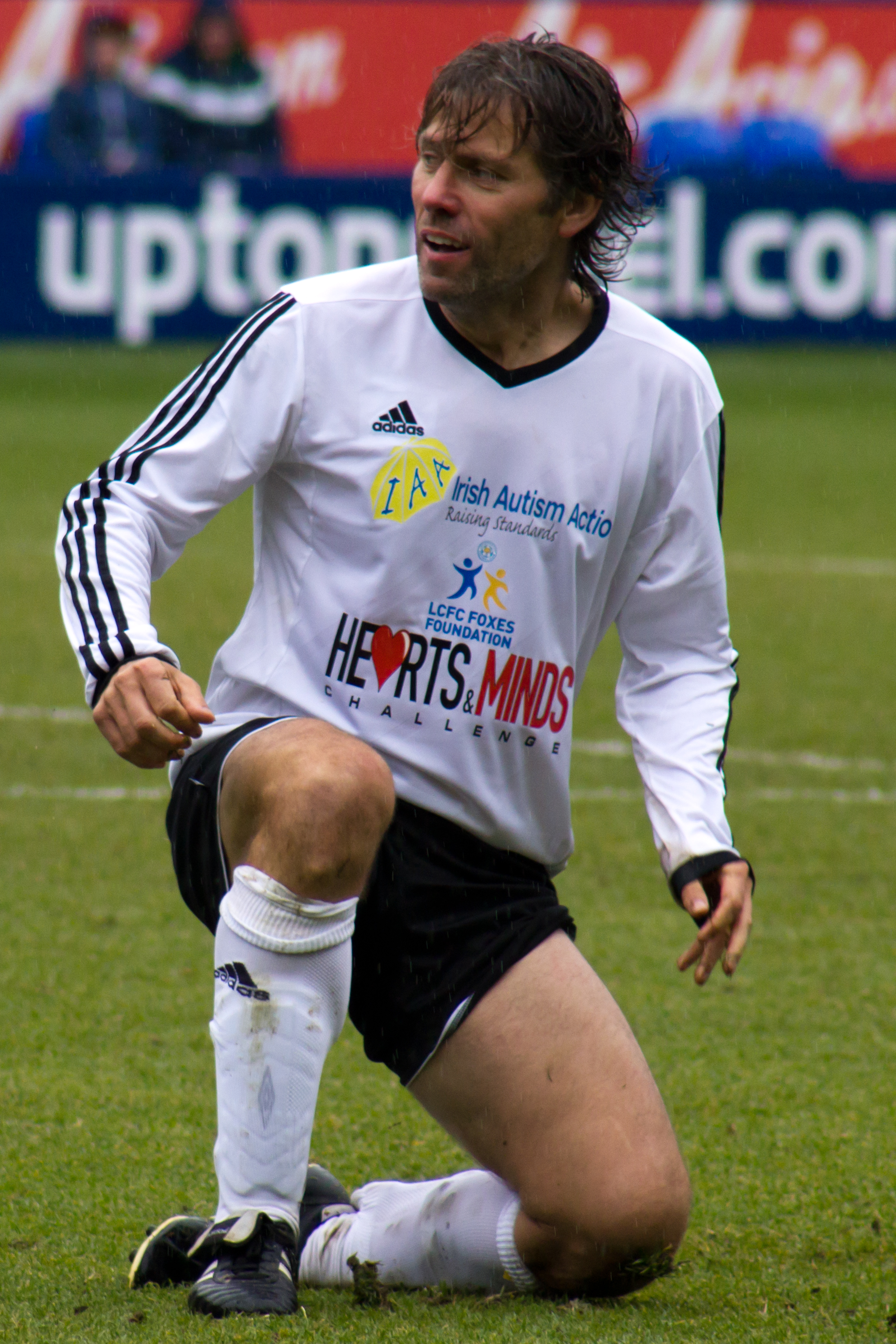
- Bishop in 2014 during a charity football game

Personal information
- Date of birth: 30 November 1966 (age 59)
- Place of birth: Liverpool, England
- Height: 5 ft 11 in (1.80 m)
- Position: Midfielder

Senior career*
Years	Team	Apps	(Gls)
1987–1988	Rhyl F.C.	9	(1)
1988–1990	Hyde United	30	(3)
1990–1991	Southport	38	(7)
Total		77	(11)
- * Club domestic league appearances and goals

Bishop split with his wife Melanie in October 2000, citing their relationship grew apart "after having three kids so quickly". To cheer himself up, he attended the Frog and Bucket comedy club in Manchester, where he put his name down for an Open Mic Night, not knowing what it was, just to avoid paying the £4 entry fee. He performed well in front of an audience of seven people, and was encouraged to return every week, which he saw as a form of counselling. One of his regular jokes was about how he missed his ex so much that he kept her severed head in the fridge. On one instance, as he said this joke, he realised his wife was in the audience, while they were in the final stages of their divorce proceedings. After the gig, they ended up chatting and reconciled as she was reminded of his earlier, funnier self. He credits comedy for saving his marriage.

The following year, he made it to the final of all the major new act competitions, including So You Think You're Funny, the Daily Telegraph Open Mic Awards, the BBC New Comedy Awards, and the City Life North West Comedian of the Year Award, which he won. In 2002, he was named best newcomer by BBC Radio Merseyside, and in 2004, he won the North West Comedy Award for best stand-up. In 2009, Bishop appeared as the first act on Michael McIntyre's Comedy Roadshow in Manchester. That year, he appeared at the Edinburgh Fringe Festival, where his show Elvis Has Left the Building was nominated for an "Eddie" (Edinburgh Comedy Award).

In 2009, Bishop appeared in Channel 4's series Comedy Showcase and was a contestant on Celebrity Mastermind. He also appeared in the BBC Three sitcom Lunch Monkeys as fireman Terry. He has appeared five times on 5 Live's Fighting Talk quiz show, claiming four victories on the programme. His material is drawn from his life's experiences, including fatherhood, cycling around the world, playing semiprofessional football, and working as a nightclub doorman. Bishop's first television appearance was in 2007 on the RTÉ topical-comedy show The Panel, where he was a regular panelist until 2008. He then went onto the Channel 4 panel show 8 out of 10 Cats before appearing on the BBC's Live at the Apollo. In December 2009, Bishop started his own TV show on LFC TV called John Bishop Meets..., where he interviewed former Liverpool F.C. players and people associated with the club.

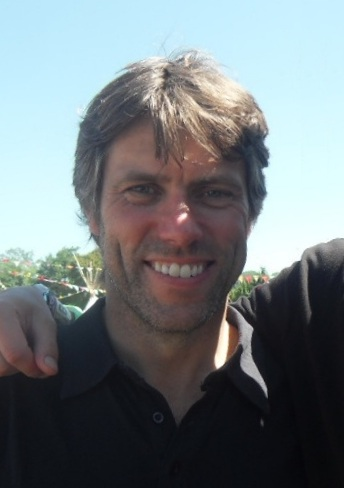
Bishop in 2011

In 2010, Bishop was a celebrity team captain on What Do Kids Know? with Rufus Hound, Joe Swash and Sara Cox on Watch. He has also appeared on BBC's Mock the Week, and Radio 4's Act Your Age. In series 3 and series 4 of Skins, Bishop portrayed Emily and Katie Fitch's father. In 2010, Bishop appeared in Ken Loach's Route Irish, which premiered at the 2010 Cannes Film Festival. Bishop is a regular panelist on Sky1 show, A League of Their Own, as well as a stand-up/sketch show for BBC One titled John Bishop's Britain. On 11 July 2010, Bishop came runner-up in the second-ever game of How Many Peter Jones'? on ITV's James Corden's World Cup Live. He has appeared as a panellist on BBC programmes Have I Got News for You, Would I Lie to You?, and on QI. On 28 October 2010, he also guest hosted an episode of series 40 of Have I Got News For You.

On 12 February 2010, during an appearance on Friday Night with Jonathan Ross it was revealed that prior to his TV breakthrough, Bishop had worked as a warm-up for the show. In March 2011, Bishop and fellow comedians Alan Carr, James Corden, Catherine Tate, and David Walliams appeared in the video for Take That's single "Happy Now" for Comic Relief. On 24 June 2012, he appeared on Desert Island Discs. On 28 August and 4 September 2012, he appeared in Accused as Peter for two episodes. In late 2012, Bishop appeared on BBC genealogy series Who Do You Think You Are? and on an ITV one-off episode called Panto!, where he starred as a local Morecambe disc jockey called Lewis Loud. As of January 2013, Bishop hosts John Bishop's Only Joking on Sky 1.

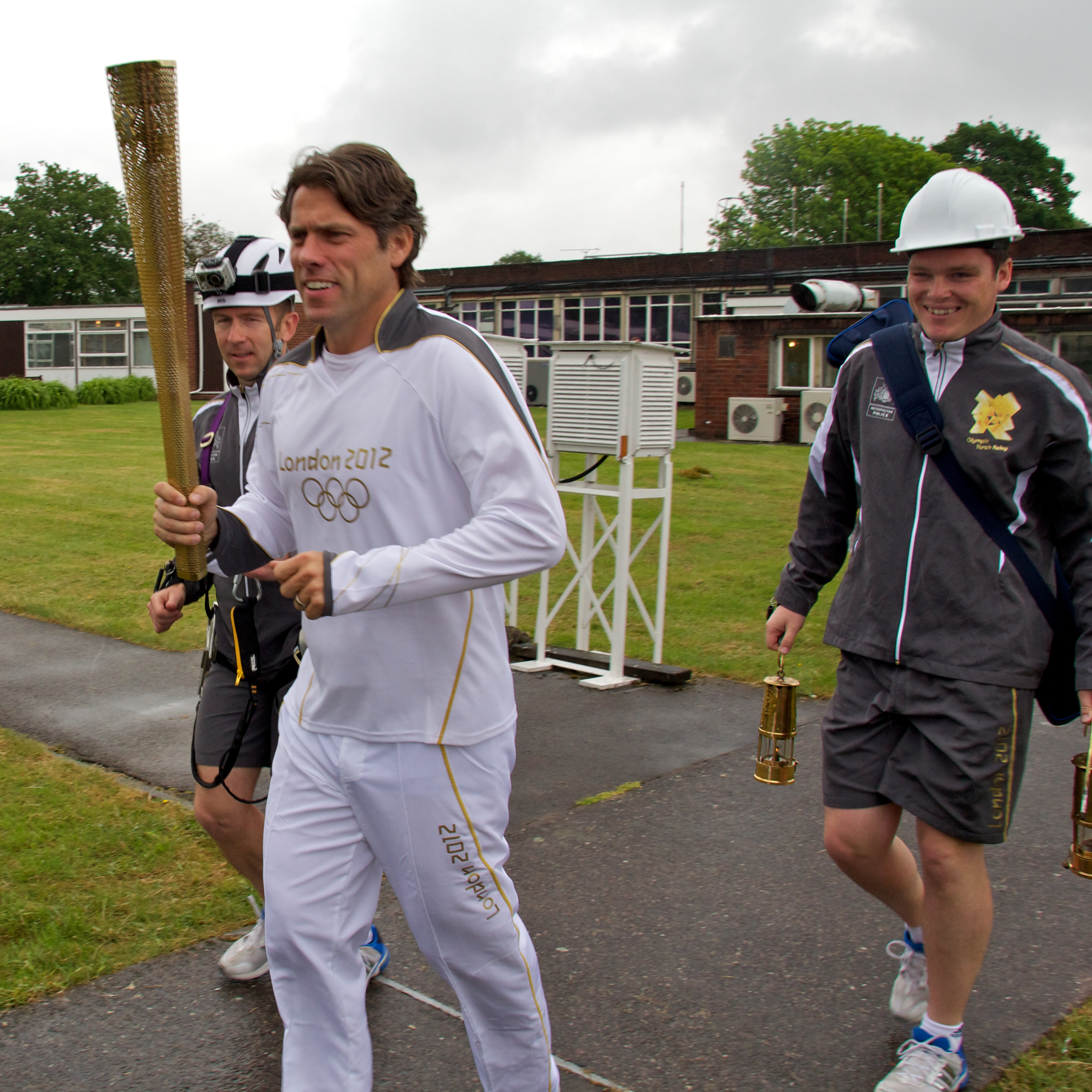
Bishop carrying the Olympic Torch at Jodrell Bank in 2012

On 28 July 2013, Bishop headlined the Vodafone comedy festival in Dublin's Iveagh Gardens. Before the gig, a reporter called Brian Boyd interviewed him about his recently replenished marriage and how his wife eventually found him funny again. His autobiography titled How Did All This Happen? was published in October 2013. In November 2013, he hosted the 2013 Royal Variety Performance at the London Palladium theatre in the presence of Charles, Prince of Wales and Camilla, Duchess of Cornwall.

In 2015, Bishop presented his own variety show on BBC One called The John Bishop Show. In May 2015, he appeared as a special guest at the Liverpool date of Murs's Never Been Better Tour and performed "Troublemaker" with him.

In January 2016, he took part in the BBC series Stargazing Live, appearing from the European Astronaut Centre, and following Tim Peake's astronaut training programme with a simulated spacewalk, underwater.

Since September 2016, Bishop has presented John Bishop: In Conversation With... for the W channel. Two series have been aired: the show will return for a third series. On 21 September 2016, Bishop was confirmed to have a role in ITV drama series Fearless, which aired in 2017. On 29 September 2016, Bishop announced that he would be going on tour for the fifth time in October and November 2017 with a show titled Winging It.

In August 2019, Bishop began presenting a football programme called Back of the Net for Amazon Prime Video with Peter Crouch and Gabby Logan. On 8 September 2020, Bishop and writer, actor and director Tony Pitts launched their new podcast called Three Little Words. This podcast was launched on the Crowd Network podcasting platform, which has financial backing from John Bishop and was started by a group of ex-BBC executives.

On 1 January 2021, Bishop announced that he would join the cast of Doctor Who as Dan Lewis, a companion of the Thirteenth Doctor. On 28 January, it was announced that Bishop would appear as a contestant on the 4th series of The Great Stand Up to Cancer Bake Off in the spring of that year.

In December 2022, Bishop starred as Vic in the pantomime Mother Goose opposite Ian McKellen in the title role at the Duke of York's Theatre in London's West End before touring the UK and Ireland until April 2023.

In 2025, Bishop narrated Tesco‘s Christmas advertising campaign. The 2025 film Is This Thing On? was inspired by the night Bishop decided to become a stand-up comedian. Bishop told the story to comedian Will Arnett who went on to write the screenplay for the film, which Bishop received a story credit for.

In October 2026, Sky announced that Bishop would host John Bishop's Comedy Night at the Coliseum, a new stand-up comedy showcase featuring established and emerging comedians. Three editions of the show are scheduled to be recorded at the London Coliseum in December 2026 and broadcast on Sky in early 2027.

== Awards ==
At the 2010 British Comedy Awards, Bishop won the Best Male Comedy Breakthrough Artist award. He became the Number 1 "Star in a reasonably priced car" on Top Gear on Sunday 23 January 2011 after he appeared on the BBC Two show. He drove the Kia Cee'd around the test track in 1 minute and 42.8 seconds to become the fastest star in the latest reasonably priced car, knocking Tom Cruise off the top. Bishop's record lasted nearly half a year until being knocked off by Rowan Atkinson (1 minute 42.2 seconds) on Sunday 17 July 2011.

On 18 July 2014, Bishop was awarded an honorary fellowship at Liverpool John Moores University in recognition of his contribution to the arts and charity work during a ceremony at Liverpool's Anglican Cathedral.

On 11 July 2018, Bishop won the Celebrity Animal Champion award at the RSPCA Honours Awards for his work with rescue animals. On 25 July 2019, Bishop received an Honorary Doctor of Arts degree from Manchester Metropolitan University for his charity work, and the contributions he has made to comedy and the arts.

== Philanthropy ==
In 1992, Bishop cycled from Sydney to Liverpool, raising £30,000 for the NSPCC. On 30 March 2010, Bishop took part in Channel 4's Comedy Gala, a benefit show held in aid of Great Ormond Street Hospital, filmed live at the O2 Arena in London.

In 2012, Bishop completed a 290-mile (470 km) triathlon from Paris to London in five days to raise money for the BBC charity Sport Relief. His "week of hell" began at the Eiffel Tower on 27 February, where he cycled 185 miles (298 km) to Calais. The next day, he rowed across the English Channel as part of a team including Davina McCall, Andrew Flintoff, and Denise Lewis, then ran 90 miles (140 km) from Dover to London in three days, finishing in Trafalgar Square on 2 March. On 23 March, during the Sport Relief telethon, it was announced that his efforts had raised £4.2 million. Also in 2012, he took part in The Justice Collective for their cover of The Hollies single "He Ain't Heavy, He's My Brother" for charities in aid of Hillsborough disaster victims. On 27 May 2012, he took part in the Soccer Aid match for Unicef, playing for the England team, who won 3–1 against the Rest of the World.

In 2014, Bishop again took part in Sport Relief as a team captain for the Clash of the Titans event, competing against Sebastian Coe and his team. In May 2014, Bishop donated £96,000 to the Hillsborough Family Support Group after being moved by personal statements delivered by the victims' families at their inquests. On 8 June 2014, he took part in his second Soccer Aid football match, again playing for England, this time losing 4–2 to the Rest of the World. On 5 June 2016, he took part in his third Soccer Aid match, playing on England's team.

In 2020, Bishop donated 100 laptops to his former school, Brookvale Academy, as he warned of a "gulf" in society risks leaving children behind.

Bishop competed in the Ciaran Geddes memorial match at the Deva Stadium, scoring two goals while playing with his brother Eddie for Chester.

== Personal life ==
Bishop and wife Melanie have been married since 1993, although they were separated for 18 months starting in 2000. They have three sons. Until 2019, they lived at Whatcroft Hall in Northwich, Cheshire. The property is a Grade II listed Georgian mansion. In April 2019, he sold the home for £6.8 million to the HS2 rail project, despite his vocal criticism of the project, and moved to West Sussex.

Bishop enjoys playing football and is a Liverpool F.C. supporter, a fact frequently brought up on the show A League of Their Own, on which he was a panellist. In July 2010, he took part in protests against then-owners of Liverpool, Tom Hicks and George Gillett, and later took part in a celebrity-studded protest video on YouTube. In May 2024, Bishop co-hosted An Evening with Jurgen Klopp and Special Guests at the M&S Bank Arena in Liverpool, an event which celebrated Jürgen Klopp's nine years as Liverpool manager and marked his final goodbye to supporters, with the night also featuring performances by Liverpool bands The Lightning Seeds and The Zutons.

Bishop pre-recorded a video message for the 2011 Labour Party conference, which was held in Liverpool.

Bishop has been a vegetarian since 1985, which he discussed on BBC Two's Something for The Weekend and his episode on food on his stand-up show John Bishop's Britain. In 2013, PETA declared him to be one of the "Sexiest Vegetarians" of the year.

In September 2016, Bishop was ranked tenth on Forbes' Top 10 Highest Paid Comedians List, earning £5.4 million a year, making him the UK's highest earning comedian.

On 30 December 2020, during the COVID-19 pandemic, Bishop revealed that he and his wife had tested positive for COVID-19 on Christmas Day and described it as the "worst illness [he has] ever had".

In 2025, Is This Thing On?, a film loosely based on his experience, was released.

== Stand-up shows ==
Year	Title	Notes
2007	The Going to Work Tour	
2008	Stick Your Job Up Your Arse	
2009–11	Elvis Has Left the Building	
2011	Sunshine	
2012	Rollercoaster	
2014–15	Supersonic	
2017–18	Winging It	
2021–22	Right Here, Right Now	
2024–25	Back At It	
2025	25	
2027	Let's Go Round Again	UK and Ireland tour

=== DVD releases ===
Title	Release date	Notes
Live - The Elvis Has Left the Building Tour	15 November 2010	Live at Liverpool's Empire Theatre
Live - The Sunshine Tour	14 November 2011	Live at Liverpool's Echo Arena
Live - Rollercoaster Tour 2012	12 November 2012	Live at Manchester's Arena
Supersonic Live at the Royal Albert Hall	15 November 2015	Live at London's Royal Albert Hall
Winging It Live	19 November 2018	Live at London's Palladium Theatre

== Filmography ==
=== Film ===
Year	Title	Role	Notes
2010	Route Irish	Frankie	
2014	One Rogue Reporter	Himself	
2017	Funny Cow	Colin Pile	
2025	Is This Thing On?		Story Credit

=== Television ===
Year	Title	Role	Notes
2007–2008	The Panel	Panellist	6 episodes
2008	Celebrity Juice	Guest panellist	Series 1, Episode 7
2009, 2010	Live at the Apollo	Guest performer	2 episodes
2009, 2010	Michael McIntyre's Comedy Roadshow	Guest performer	Series 1, Episode 2 & Series 2, Episode 3
2009–2010	Skins	Rob Fitch	Series 3–4 (3 episodes)
2010	Have I Got News for You	Guest presenter	Series 39, Episode 9 & Series 40, Episode 3
2010	Mock the Week	Guest panellist	Series 8, Episode 2
2010	Would I Lie to You?	Guest panellist	Series 4, Episode 8
2010–2011	John Bishop's Britain	Presenter	2 series on BBC One
2010–2011	A League of Their Own	Regular (appeared as a guest panelist in Series 11)	4 series
2011	Top Gear	Guest	Series 16, Episode 1
2011	Little Crackers	Bobby	Series 2, Episode 7: "John Bishop's Little Cracker"
2012	Who Do You Think You Are?	Himself	Series 9, Episode 10
2012	Accused	Peter Cartwright	Two episodes (Stephen's Story and Tina's Story)
2012	Panto!	Lewis Loud	With Sheridan Smith
2013	John Bishop's Only Joking	Presenter	
2013	Royal Variety Performance	Presenter	
2013–2015	John Bishop's Christmas Show	Presenter	One-off specials for BBC One
2014	John Bishop's Australia	Presenter	Mini-series
2014	A Night in With Olly Murs	Himself	One-off special
2015	Backchat	Guest	Series 2, Episode 5
2015	The John Bishop Show	Presenter	1 series
2015	TFI Friday	Guest	Series 7, Episode 6
2015	John Bishop's Gorilla Adventure	Presenter	One-off show
2015	Top Gear from A-Z	Narrator	One-off specials
2016	Jamie & Jimmy's Friday Night Feast	Guest	Series 4, Episode 1
2016–2018	John Bishop: In Conversation With...	Presenter	Also executive producer
2017	The Nightly Show	Guest presenter	5 episodes
2017	Fearless	Steve Livesey	ITV drama, 4 episodes
2019	John Bishop's Ireland	Presenter	Mini-series
2020	John Bishop's Great Whale Rescue	Presenter	Mini-series
2021	The Great Celebrity Bake Off For Stand Up to Cancer	Himself	Series 4, Episode 5
2021	The Masked Dancer	Guest panelist	Series 1 Semi-final
2021–2022	Doctor Who	Dan Lewis	Series 13 and 2022 specials; 9 episodes
2022	The John Bishop Show	Presenter	ITV comedy series
2022	This Is My House for Red Nose Day	Narrator	Red Nose Day special for BBC One
2022	John & Joe Bishop: Life After Deaf	Presenter	Documentary
2023	DNA Journey	Himself	With Hugh Bonneville
2025	Code of Silence	Ray Woods	Episode 5
2026	Wisdom of the Crowd	Host	Quiz-based entertainment show

=== Music videos ===
- 2011: Take That – "Happy Now" for Comic Relief
- 2012: The Justice Collective – "He Ain't Heavy, He's My Brother"

=== Stage ===
- 2009: One Night in Istanbul – Tom
- 2022–2023: Mother Goose – Vic
