= List of The Last Leg episodes =

The following is a list of episodes for the British political satire and talk show The Last Leg which began airing on 30 August 2012 on Channel 4, originally as part of the channel's London 2012 Paralympic Games coverage and later spun off as its own show after the games finished. It is hosted by Adam Hills, Alex Brooker and Josh Widdicombe. Typical episodes are broadcast live with occasional, short prerecorded segments. The Last Leg Goes Down Under and the Christmas & New Year's Eve specials are fully prerecorded. As of 3 April 2026, 377 episodes of The Last Leg have aired.

== Series overview ==
Series	Episodes		Originally released	
Series	Episodes		First released	Last released
London 2012	11	10	30 August 2012	8 September 2012
London 2012	11	1	30 December 2012	
1	9		25 January 2013	29 March 2013
2	8		13 July 2013	18 September 2013
3	8		31 January 2014	21 March 2014
4	6		1 August 2014	5 September 2014
5	9	1	2 January 2015	
5	9	8	9 January 2015	17 February 2015
GE	3		23 April 2015	7 May 2015
6	11		26 June 2015	4 September 2015
SU2C	1		9 October 2015	
DU	2		29 January 2016	5 February 2016
7	8		12 February 2016	1 April 2016
8	6		10 June 2016	15 July 2016
Rio 2016	11		7 September 2016	17 September 2016
9	12	1	7 October 2016	
9	12	10	14 October 2016	16 December 2016
9	12	1	23 December 2016	
10	13		27 January 2017	21 April 2017
11	13		9 May 2017	11 August 2017
12	13		29 September 2017	22 December 2017
13	10		26 January 2018	23 March 2018
14	9		22 June 2018	17 August 2018
15	11		12 October 2018	31 December 2018
16	10		25 January 2019	29 March 2019
17	9		17 May 2019	12 July 2019
18	10		25 October 2019	31 December 2019
19	10		17 January 2020	20 March 2020
LDU	5		8 May 2020	5 June 2020
20	9		23 October 2020	31 December 2020
21	8		15 January 2021	5 March 2021
22	7		4 June 2021	16 July 2021
Tokyo 2020	12		24 August 2021	4 September 2021
23	13		24 September 2021	31 December 2021
24	9		28 January 2022	25 March 2022
25	10		15 July 2022	23 September 2022
26	7		18 November 2022	16 December 2022
27	8		27 January 2023	17 March 2023
28	7		30 June 2023	11 August 2023
29	8		10 November 2023	31 December 2023
30	8		16 February 2024	5 April 2024
Paris 2024	11		28 August 2024	8 September 2024
31	10		25 October 2024	31 December 2024
32	10		24 January 2025	28 March 2025
33	12		17 October 2025	31 December 2025
34	10		30 January 2026	3 April 2026
35	TBA		16 October 2026	TBA

== Episodes ==
Episode ratings from BARB. All viewing figures from series 8 onwards include Channel 4 +1. All viewing figures from series 15 onwards include four-screen data.

=== 2012 ===
==== The Last Leg with Adam Hills ====
This series was broadcast during the 2012 Paralympic Games.

No. overall	No. in series	Guest(s)	Original release date	Viewers (millions)
1	1	Andrew Flintoff	30 August 2012	N/A
2	2	Christine Ohuruogu	31 August 2012	N/A
3	3	Rachael Latham	1 September 2012	1.05
4	4	Jimmy Carr and Nkegbe Botsyo	2 September 2012	1.26
5	5	Jody Cundy	3 September 2012	1.17
6	6	Sean Lock and Jacqueline Freney	4 September 2012	0.98
7	7	Warwick Davis	5 September 2012	1.03
8	8	Jimmy Carr and Hannah Cockroft	6 September 2012	0.90
9	9	Jonnie Peacock and Jason Smyth	7 September 2012	1.33 (Note: 1.22 million on Channel 4, 105,000 on Channel 4 +1)
10	10	Dominic West, Rachael Latham, Giles Long, Diana Mann, Iwan Thomas, Lee Pearson, Jody Cundy, Liz Johnson, Charlotte Henshaw and Claire Cashmore	8 September 2012	1.27
11	Special	The Last Leg of the Year: Nicola Adams, Jonnie Peacock, Jamie Oliver and Rachel Onasanwo (Note: Best known as the Happiest Olympic Worker.)	30 December 2012	N/A

=== 2013 ===
==== Series 1 ====
No. overall	No. in series	Guest(s)	Original release date	Viewers (millions)
12	1	Idris Elba	25 January 2013	N/A
13	2	Brian Cox	1 February 2013	N/A
14	3	Rafe Spall	8 February 2013	N/A
15	4	Jack Dee	15 February 2013	1.31
16	5	Jenna-Louise Coleman	22 February 2013	1.21
17	6	Jonathan Ross	1 March 2013	N/A
18	7	Duncan Bannatyne	8 March 2013	N/A
19	8	Jo Brand	22 March 2013	1.18
20	9	Kevin Bridges and Jody Cundy	29 March 2013	1.20

Note: Episode 8 was moved back a week because of Hawking being aired in its timeslot on 15 March 2013.

==== Series 2 ====
No. overall	No. in series	Guest(s)	Original release date	Viewers (millions)
21	1	Russell Brand	31 July 2013	0.98
22	2	Micky Flanagan	7 August 2013	1.14
23	3	Alan Carr	14 August 2013	1.02
24	4	Gabby Logan	21 August 2013	1.06
25	5	Tanyalee Davis and Dara Ó Briain	28 August 2013	1.06
26	6	Boris Johnson	4 September 2013	1.08
27	7	Jack Whitehall	11 September 2013	1.12
28	8	Eddie Izzard	18 September 2013	1.14

=== 2014 ===
==== Series 3 ====
No. overall	No. in series	Guest(s)	Original release date	Viewers (millions)
29	1	Clare Balding and Micky Flanagan (Note: Flanagan was a guest host in place of Brooker, who was filming The Jump in Austria.)	31 January 2014	1.39
30	2	Tinie Tempah and Eddie "The Eagle" Edwards	7 February 2014	1.50
31	3	Warwick Davis	14 February 2014	1.38
32	4	Claudia Winkleman	21 February 2014	1.34
33	5	James Corden	28 February 2014	1.44
34	6	Richard Ayoade and Hannah Cockroft	7 March 2014	1.39
35	7	Jennifer Saunders	14 March 2014	1.72 (Note: 1.47 million on Channel 4, 254,000 on Channel 4 +1)
36	8	Frank Skinner	21 March 2014	1.34

==== Series 4 ====
No. overall	No. in series	Guest(s)	Original release date	Viewers (millions)
37	1	Simon Bird, Joe Thomas, Blake Harrison and James Buckley	1 August 2014	1.18
38	2	Noel Fielding	8 August 2014	1.21
39	3	Carrie Fisher	15 August 2014	1.24
40	4	Daniel Radcliffe	22 August 2014	1.06
41	5	John Bishop	29 August 2014	1.48
42	6	Nick Frost	5 September 2014	1.45

=== 2015 ===
==== Series 5 ====
No. overall	No. in series	Guest(s)	Original release date	Viewers (millions)
43	Special	The Last Leg of the Year: Richard Ayoade	2 January 2015	1.55
44	1	Dara Ó Briain	9 January 2015	1.56
45	2	Alan Davies	16 January 2015	1.61
46	3	Kathy Burke	23 January 2015	1.42
47	4	Nick Clegg	30 January 2015	1.43
48	5	Stephen Mangan	6 February 2015	1.56 (Note: 1.31 million on Channel 4, 249,000 on Channel 4 +1)
49	6	David Mitchell	13 February 2015	1.90 (Note: 1.68 million on Channel 4, 223,000 on Channel 4 +1)
50	7	Russell Crowe	20 February 2015	1.93 (Note: 1.71 million on Channel 4, 217,000 on Channel 4 +1)
51	8	Sarah Millican and RJ Mitte	27 February 2015	1.89 (Note: 1.64 million on Channel 4, 249,000 on Channel 4 +1)

==== General election specials ====
No. overall	No. in series	Guest(s)	Original release date	Viewers (millions)
52	Special–1	Nick Clegg and Piers Morgan	23 April 2015	1.19
53	Special–2	Jeremy Paxman	30 April 2015	1.14
54	Special–3	Kathy Burke, Jack Dee and Dave Rowntree	7 May 2015 (Note: Aired in multiple parts across Channel 4's Alternative Election Night coverage.)	N/A

==== Series 6 ====
No. overall	No. in series	Guest(s)	Original release date	Viewers (millions)
55	1	Stephen Merchant	26 June 2015	1.25
56	2	Johnny Vegas	3 July 2015	1.41
57	3	Joanna Lumley	10 July 2015	1.62 (Note: 1.41 million on Channel 4, 210,000 on Channel 4 +1)
58	4	Amy Poehler	17 July 2015	1.49
59	5	Jason Manford	24 July 2015	1.55
60	6	John Cleese	31 July 2015	1.76
61	7	Bill Bailey	7 August 2015	1.72
62	8	Romesh Ranganathan	14 August 2015	2.01 (Note: 1.78 million on Channel 4, 232,000 on Channel 4 +1)
63	9	Jack Whitehall	21 August 2015	1.79
64	10	Katherine Ryan	28 August 2015	1.93 (Note: 1.69 million on Channel 4, 240,000 on Channel 4 +1)
65	11	Lee Mack	4 September 2015	1.93 (Note: 1.71 million on Channel 4, 221,000 on Channel 4 +1)

==== Stand Up to Cancer special ====
No. overall	No. in series	Guest(s)	Original release date	Viewers (millions)
66	N–A	Greg Davies and Russell Howard	9 October 2015	1.25

=== 2016 ===
==== Down Under ====
No. overall	No. in series	Guest(s)	Original release date	Viewers (millions)
67	Special–1	Amar Latif, Ian Smith and Kevin Bloody Wilson	29 January 2016	1.70
68	Special–2	Amar Latif	5 February 2016	1.56

==== Series 7 ====
No. overall	No. in series	Guest(s)	Original release date	Viewers (millions)
69	1	Richard Osman	12 February 2016	2.34 (Note: 2.15 million on Channel 4, 189,000 on Channel 4 +1)
70	2	Catherine Tate	19 February 2016	2.62 (Note: 2.29 million on Channel 4, 332,000 on Channel 4 +1)
71	3	Sue Perkins	26 February 2016	2.32 (Note: 2.02 million on Channel 4, 299,000 on Channel 4 +1)
72	4	Caitlin Moran	4 March 2016	2.13
73	5	Richard Ayoade	11 March 2016	2.16
74	6	Louis Theroux	18 March 2016	1.72
75	7	Jonathan Ross	25 March 2016	1.80
76	8	Charlotte Church	1 April 2016 (Note: This episode was retitled to "Your Mum", following a viewer poll in the previous week's episode inspired by the public campaign to call the naval research ship that was ultimately named RRS Sir David Attenborough "Boaty McBoatface".)	2.28 (Note: 1.99 million on Channel 4, 289,000 on Channel 4 +1)

==== Series 8 ====
No. overall	No. in series	Guest(s)	Original release date	Viewers (millions)
77	1	Jeremy Corbyn, Russell Crowe, Johnny Vegas and Richard Fairbrass	10 June 2016	2.26
78	2	Jesse Eisenberg and Kunal Nayyar	17 June 2016	1.97
79	3	Stephen Mangan, John Mann, Stanley Johnson and Lolly Adefope	24 June 2016 (Note: EU Referendum special, retitled to "Last Leg In, Last Leg Out".)	2.53
80	4	Carrie Fisher	1 July 2016	1.81
81	5	Greg Davies	8 July 2016	2.01
82	6	Katherine Ryan	15 July 2016	1.79

==== Live from Rio ====
During the 2016 Paralympics, broadcast nightly live from a studio in Rio de Janeiro, Brazil.

No. overall	No. in series	Guest(s)	Original release date	Viewers (millions)
83	Special–1	Clare Balding, RJ Mitte, JJ Chalmers, Sophie Morgan, Arthur Williams and Ade Adepitan	7 September 2016	1.14
84	Special–2	Stephen Mangan and Marlou van Rhijn	8 September 2016	1.82
85	Special–3	Johnny Vegas and Stefanie Reid	9 September 2016	2
86	Special–4	Stephen Mangan, Jonnie Peacock and Ali Jawad	10 September 2016	1.86
87	Special–5	Johnny Vegas, Jody Cundy, Jon-Allan Butterworth and Matt Stutzman	11 September 2016	1.98
88	Special–6	Johnny Vegas, Aled Davies, Jonnie Peacock and Rebecca Redfern	12 September 2016	2.15
89	Special–7	Katherine Ryan, Lauren Steadman, Andy Lewis and Hollie Arnold	13 September 2016	2.17
90	Special–8	Stephen Mangan, Sascha Kindred, Jordanne Whiley and Lucy Shuker	14 September 2016	1.73
91	Special–9	Katherine Ryan, RJ Mitte, Andrew Lapthorne, Dylan Alcott, Jeanette Chippington, Emma Wiggs and Anne Dickins	15 September 2016	2.31
92	Special–10	Richard Whitehead, Katherine Ryan, Will Bayley, Rob Davies, Georgina Hermitage, Sophie Hahn and David Smith	16 September 2016	2.18
93	Special–11	Hannah Cockroft, Gordon Reid, Kadeena Cox, Liam Malone, and Sarah Storey	17 September 2016	2.27

==== Series 9 ====
No. overall	No. in series	Guest(s)	Original release date	Viewers (millions)
94	Special	Ellie Simmonds, Jonnie Peacock, Clare Balding, Johnny Vegas and Ellie Robinson	7 October 2016	2.11
95	2	John Bishop	14 October 2016	2.38
96	3	Roisin Conaty and Jeremy Paxman	28 October 2016	2.29
97	4	Jack Whitehall	4 November 2016	2.25
98	Special	Richard Osman, Ed Balls and Rachel Johnson	9 November 2016 (Note: US Election special.)	2.58
99	5	Gemma Chan and Basil Brush	11 November 2016	2.23
100	6	David Walliams	18 November 2016	1.77
101	7	Jessica Hynes	25 November 2016	1.66
102	8	Russell Howard	2 December 2016	1.75
103	9	Ricky Gervais	9 December 2016	2.10
104	10	Miranda Hart	16 December 2016	2.12
105	Special	The Last Leg of the Year: Grayson Perry, Aisling Bea, Joel Dommett and Basil Brush	23 December 2016 (Note: Christmas special.)	2.15

=== 2017 ===
==== Series 10 ====
No. overall	No. in series	Guest(s)	Original release date	Viewers (millions)
106	1	David Tennant	27 January 2017	1.88
107	2	Russell Brand	3 February 2017	1.98
108	3	Sue Perkins	10 February 2017	1.92
109	4	Victoria Coren Mitchell and Stormzy	17 February 2017	1.97
110	5	Alan Davies	24 February 2017	1.98
111	6	Sharon Horgan and Rob Delaney	3 March 2017	2.17
112	7	Brian Cox and Harry Hill	10 March 2017	1.91
113	8	Kevin Bridges	17 March 2017	1.91
114	9	James Blunt and Sandi Toksvig	24 March 2017	1.59
115	10	Charlotte Ritchie, Simon Bird and Tom Rosenthal	31 March 2017	1.91
116	11	Ed Miliband and Aisling Bea	7 April 2017	2.04
117	12	Hayley Squires and Miriam Margolyes	14 April 2017	2.01
118	13	Alan Carr and Tinie Tempah	21 April 2017	2.23

==== Series 11 ====
No. overall	No. in series	Guest(s)	Original release date	Viewers (millions)
119	1	Armando Iannucci	19 May 2017	2.18
120	2	Richard Ayoade and Mhairi Black	26 May 2017	2.27
121	3	Sue Perkins	2 June 2017	1.84
122	4	Jessica Hynes, Richard Osman, Clive Lewis, Baroness Sayeeda Warsi, Jamie Oliver, Brendan Cox and Mr. Fishfinger	9 June 2017 (Note: Two-hour General Election special, titled as the "Elegtion Special")	1.92
123	5	Stephen Mangan, Jon Richardson, Katherine Ryan, Alastair Campbell, Nick Clegg, James Cleverly, Lily Cole, James Buckley, Ed Balls, Katya Jones, Andy Burnham, Sophie Walker, Michael Gove, Tony Blair, William Hague, Ruth Davidson, Nicola Sturgeon, Gary Lineker, Steve Coogan, Rob Beckett, Sara Pascoe, Catherine Tate, Alan Carr, Romesh Ranganathan, Sue Perkins, Joe Wilkinson, Joe Lycett, Anthony Joshua, Martin Freeman, Aisling Bea, David Cameron, John Major, Gordon Brown, Krishnan Guru-Murthy, Jon Snow, Cathy Newman, Matt Frei, Alastair Stewart, Lucy Verasamy, Robert Peston, Dermot Murnaghan, Gillian Joseph, Sarah-Jane Mee, Ed Miliband, Elbow and Courteeners	16 June 2017 (Note: Two-hour "Re-United Kingdom" special - from the Channel 4 page: "Inspired by and in memory of MP Jo Cox, this special show celebrates what we have in common a year after her death.")	1.76
124	6	Kathy Burke and Tez Ilyas	23 June 2017	1.96
125	7	Andy Serkis	30 June 2017	2.09
126	8	Kumail Nanjiani and Rob Beckett	7 July 2017	1.79
127	9	Eddie Smith, Johnny Vegas, Roisin Conaty, Liam Malone, Lazylegz, Sergio "Checho" Carvajal, Lucy Shuker and Hannah Cockroft	14 July 2017 (Note: Post-World ParaAthletics Championships special - from the Channel 4 page: "Adam, Alex and Josh update on the highs and lows of the World Para Athletic Championships, and are joined by gold medallist Liam Malone and many more athletes in the studio.")	1.59
128	10	Ellie Simmonds, Liam Malone, Hannah Cockroft, Jonnie Peacock, Isis Holt, Hollie Arnold, Richard Whitehead, Sophie Kamlish and Sadiq Khan	21 July 2017	1.58
129	11	John Cleese and Sara Pascoe	28 July 2017	1.81
130	12	Aisling Bea	4 August 2017	1.40
131	13	Al Gore	11 August 2017	1.49

==== Series 12 ====
No. overall	No. in series	Guest(s)	Original release date	Viewers (millions)
132	1	Joanna Lumley, Russell Howard, Jonnie Peacock and Oti Mabuse (Note: Also featured cameos from Louise Redknapp, Aaron Ramsey, Johnny Vegas, Ellie Robinson, Basil Brush, Clare Balding, Jack Wilshire and Katherine Ryan.)	29 September 2017	1.92
133	2	Victoria Coren Mitchell, Robert Webb, Jess Robinson and Adam Riches	6 October 2017	1.77
134	3	Armando Iannucci, Sue Perkins and John Anderson	13 October 2017	1.90
135	4	James Acaster, Kasabian, Jonnie Peacock and Oti Mabuse	20 October 2017	1.69
136	5	Russell Brand	27 October 2017	1.70
137	6	Greg Davies and Roisin Conaty (Note: Stand Up to Cancer special.)	3 November 2017	1.83
138	7	Harry Hill, Anna Soubry and Zippy	10 November 2017	1.87
139	8	Sandi Toksvig and Jessie Ware	17 November 2017	1.56
140	9	Margaret Cho, Rhys Darby, Jonnie Peacock and Oti Mabuse	24 November 2017	1.47
141	10	Matt Lucas and Rebecca Front	1 December 2017	1.42
142	11	Danny Dyer and Lionel Blair	8 December 2017	1.44
143	12	Jon Hamm and Rag'n'Bone Man	15 December 2017	1.63
144	13	The Last Leg of the Year: Stephen Merchant, Georgia Toffolo, Jona Lewie and Ed Miliband	22 December 2017	1.83

=== 2018 ===
==== Series 13 ====
No. overall	No. in series	Guest(s)	Original release date	Viewers (millions)
145	1	David Tennant, Rachel Johnson and Craig David	26 January 2018	1.55
146	2	Stephen Fry	2 February 2018	1.72
147	3	Fay Ripley, Maya Jama and Emily Thornberry	9 February 2018	1.65
148	4	Sally Phillips and Example	16 February 2018	1.48
149	5	Richard Ayoade, Kermit the Frog, Miss Piggy and Anne-Marie	23 February 2018	1.73
150	6	Vicky McClure and Tom Davis	2 March 2018	1.89
151	7	will.i.am and Kathy Burke	9 March 2018 (Note: Winter Paralympics special)	1.95
152	8	Noel Fielding, Jonnie Peacock, Charlotte Evans, Hannah Cockroft and Kadeena Cox	11 March 2018	1.00
153	9	Claudia Winkleman and Cuba Gooding Jr.	16 March 2018	1.99
154	10	Michael Sheen, Menna Fitzpatrick and Jennifer Kehoe	23 March 2018	1.57

==== Series 14 ====
No. overall	No. in series	Guest(s)	Original release date	Viewers (millions)
155	1	Johnny Vegas and Roisin Conaty	22 June 2018	1.54
156	2	Harry Shearer	29 June 2018	1.46
157	3	Aisling Bea and Miriam Margolyes (Note: Also featured cameos from Michael Sheen and Ed Miliband.)	6 July 2018	1.47
158	4	Jo Brand and Richard Osman	13 July 2018	1.51
159	5	Anna Soubry and Tom Davis	20 July 2018	1.59
160	6	Richard Ayoade	27 July 2018	1.80
161	7	David Tennant and Sara Pascoe	3 August 2018	1.51
162	8	John Bishop and Joe Thomas	10 August 2018	1.60
163	9	Lily Allen and Caitlyn Jenner	17 August 2018	1.33

==== Series 15 ====
No. overall	No. in series	Guest(s)	Original release date	Viewers (millions)
164	1	Jessica Hynes and Chris O'Dowd	12 October 2018	1.59
165	2	Tracey Ullman	19 October 2018	1.73
166	3	Joe Wilkinson, Lauren Steadman and AJ Pritchard	2 November 2018	1.65
167	4	Russell Howard and Tamsin Greig	9 November 2018	1.64
168	5	Jimmy Carr and Kerry Godliman	16 November 2018	1.66
169	6	Stephen Merchant and Taika Waititi	23 November 2018	1.40
170	7	Bill Bailey, Lauren Steadman, AJ Pritchard and Mumford and Sons	30 November 2018	1.13
171	8	Joe Lycett and Rosie Jones	7 December 2018	1.30
172	9	Kathy Burke and Sue Perkins	14 December 2018	1.86
173	10	Rob Delaney, Sharon Horgan and Roy Wood	21 December 2018	1.61
174	11	The Last Leg of the Year: Johnny Vegas, Richard Ayoade, Katherine Ryan, Jessica Knappett, Nish Kumar, Tom Allen, Lost Voice Guy and Alex Horne & The Horne Section	31 December 2018	1.88

=== 2019 ===
==== Series 16 ====
No. overall	No. in series	Guest(s)	Original release date	Viewers (millions)
175	1	John Bishop and Jessica Hynes	25 January 2019	1.48
176	2	Alastair Campbell and Paloma Faith	1 February 2019	1.43
177	3	Zawe Ashton and David Mitchell	8 February 2019	1.66
178	4	Rosamund Pike and Tom Allen	15 February 2019	1.45
179	5	Michael Sheen and Anna Soubry	22 February 2019	1.64
180	6	Stephen Merchant	1 March 2019	1.71
181	7	Kerry Godliman and Jack McBrayer	8 March 2019	1.70
182	8	Richard Ayoade and Victoria Coren Mitchell	15 March 2019	1.31
183	9	Kevin Bridges and Sara Pascoe	22 March 2019	1.72
184	10	Aisling Bea, Stacey Dooley and Chesney Hawkes	29 March 2019	1.68

==== Series 17 ====
No. overall	No. in series	Guest(s)	Original release date	Viewers (millions)
185	1	Jonathan Ross and Katherine Ryan	17 May 2019	1.61
186	2 (Note: Alex Brooker was unable to attend the recording of this episode.)	Rob Beckett and Joanna Lumley	24 May 2019	1.61
187	3	Harry Hill and Rosie Jones	31 May 2019	1.68
188	4	Romesh Ranganathan and Ellie Taylor	7 June 2019	1.59
189	5	Sean Lock and Lorraine Kelly	14 June 2019	2.05
190	6	Sandi Toksvig and Phil Wang	21 June 2019	1.78
191	7	Sara Pascoe and Stephen Mangan	28 June 2019	1.60
192	8 (Note: Josh Widdicombe was unable to attend the recording of this episode.)	Tom Allen, Louis Theroux and Jessica Knappett	5 July 2019	1.68
193	9	Michael Sheen and Roisin Conaty	12 July 2019	1.66

==== Series 18 ====
No. overall	No. in series	Guest(s)	Original release date	Viewers (millions)
194	1	Kathy Burke and Harry Hill	25 October 2019	1.44
195	2	Jimmy Carr and Sandi Toksvig	1 November 2019	1.65
196	3	Aisling Bea and Nish Kumar	8 November 2019	1.50
197	4	Joe Lycett and Daisy May Cooper	15 November 2019	1.49
198	5	Kevin Bridges and Victoria Coren Mitchell	22 November 2019	1.57
199	6	Ellie Taylor and Richard Ayoade	29 November 2019	1.29
200	7	Stacey Dooley, Noel Fielding and Jamali Maddix (Note: Extended Elegtion Special.)	6 December 2019	1.38
201	8	Richard Osman, Miriam Margolyes, Anna Soubry, Rory Stewart and Count Binface (Note: Elegtion Special.)	13 December 2019	1.59
202	9	Lorraine Kelly and Tom Allen	20 December 2019	1.54
203	10	The Last Leg Of The Year: Sue Perkins, Sara Pascoe, Tom Davis, Zawe Ashton, Rosie Jones, Johnny Vegas, Billy Monger and Alex Horne & The Horne Section	31 December 2019	1.79

=== 2020 ===
==== Series 19 ====
No. overall	No. in series	Guest(s)	Original release date	Viewers (millions)
204	1	John Bishop and Jess Phillips	17 January 2020	1.58
205	2	Suzi Ruffell and David Tennant	24 January 2020	1.44
206	3	Armando Iannucci, Tom Allen, Guz Khan, Aisling Bea and Geoff Norcott (Note: Countdown to Brexit special.)	31 January 2020	1.82
207	4	Steph McGovern and Sandi Toksvig	7 February 2020	1.51
208	5	Lizzy Caplan and Dara Ó Briain	14 February 2020	1.44
209	6	Jesse Eisenberg, Imogen Poots and Jon Richardson	21 February 2020	1.78
210	7	Daisy May Cooper and Charlie Cooper	28 February 2020	1.73
211	8	John Bercow and Sara Pascoe	6 March 2020	1.76
212	9	Sean Lock and Rosie Jones	13 March 2020	1.48
213	10	Lorraine Kelly and Tom Allen (Note: Recorded without a studio audience due to COVID-19.)	20 March 2020	2.19

==== Locked Down Under ====
Filmed from presenters’ and guests‘ separate houses with Hills at his home in Australia.

No. overall	No. in series	Guest(s)	Original release date	Viewers (millions)
214	1	Rob Beckett, Miriam Margolyes and Alex Horne & The Horne Section	8 May 2020	1.85
215	2	Kevin Bridges, Aisling Bea, Gunnersaurus Rex, Thierry Henry, Craig David and Alex Horne & The Horne Section	15 May 2020	2.03
216	3	Sarah Millican, Jamali Maddix and Alex Horne & The Horne Section	22 May 2020	1.92
217	4	Stephen Merchant, Sue Perkins and Alex Horne & The Horne Section	29 May 2020	1.73
218	5	Desiree Burch, Harry Hill, Lorraine Kelly and Alex Horne & The Horne Section	5 June 2020	1.91

==== Series 20 ====
This series was filmed without a live studio audience due to continued COVID-19 restrictions.

No. overall	No. in series	Guest(s)	Original release date	Viewers (millions)
219	1	Sara Pascoe, Richard Ayoade, Kevin Bridges and Xand van Tulleken	23 October 2020	1.89
220	2	Desiree Burch and Sandi Toksvig (Note: Alex Brooker appeared in this episode via Zoom.)	30 October 2020	2.01
221	3	Jimmy Carr, Richard Osman and Ayesha Hazarika (Note: US Elegtion special.)	6 November 2020	2.35
222	4	Victoria Coren Mitchell, Darren Harriott, Rosie Jones and Krishnan Guru-Murthy	13 November 2020	2.29
223	5	Joe Wilkinson, Rosie Jones, Duncan James, Jason Donovan and Matthew McConaughey	20 November 2020	1.76
224	6	David Mitchell and Aisling Bea	27 November 2020	1.84
225	7	Jon Richardson and Sindhu Vee	4 December 2020	1.63
226	8	Guest presenter Lorraine Kelly, Joe Lycett, Stacey Dooley and Shakin' Stevens (Note: During the episode on 4 December it was announced Kelly would present with Hills returning to Melbourne for Christmas. Hills appeared via Zoom.)	11 December 2020	2.47
227	9	The Last Leg of the Year: Tom Allen, Lorraine Kelly, James Acaster, Judi Love, Asim Chaudhry, Clara Amfo, John Bercow, Basil Brush, Pat Cash, Ed Miliband, Jason Donovan, Ryan Moloney, Carole Baskin, Jody Cundy, Kadeena Cox, Ellie Robinson, Lauren Steadman and Alex Horne & The Horne Section	31 December 2020	2.49

=== 2021 ===
==== Series 21 ====
This series was filmed without a live studio audience due to continued COVID-19 restrictions.

No. overall	No. in series	Guest(s)	Original release date	Viewers (millions)
228	1	Sue Perkins, Rose Matafeo, Munya Chawawa, Bez and Hannah Fry	15 January 2021	1.98
229	2	Tom Davis and Maisie Adam	22 January 2021	1.92
230	3	Sara Pascoe and Phil Wang	29 January 2021	1.78
231	4	Sandi Toksvig, Jamali Maddix, Diane Youdale and Jacki Weaver	5 February 2021	1.89
232	5	Guz Khan and Suzi Ruffell	12 February 2021	1.96
233	6	Armando Iannucci, Sophie Duker and Jacki Weaver	19 February 2021	1.80
234	7	Judi Love, Harry Hill and Basil Brush	26 February 2021	2.04
235	8	Joanna Lumley, Nish Kumar, Bez and Jackie Weaver	5 March 2021	2.32

==== Series 22 ====
This series was filmed without a live studio audience due to continued COVID-19 restrictions.

No. overall	No. in series	Guest(s)	Original release date	Viewers (millions)
236	1	Rob Beckett, Sara Pascoe and The Mechanics (Note: Sara stepped in last minute to replace Maya Jama, who was originally scheduled to appear but was ill)	4 June 2021	1.79
237	2	Kevin Bridges, AJ Odudu and Uri Geller	11 June 2021	1.67
238	3	David Tennant, Judi Love and Uri Geller	18 June 2021	1.30
239	4	David Baddiel and Lorraine Kelly	25 June 2021	2.23
240	5	Aisling Bea, Richard Ayoade, Sheldon Edwards, Ray Cornwell and John Barnes	2 July 2021	1.64
241	6	Tom Allen, Baroness Warsi, John Barnes and David Baddiel, Frank Skinner & The Lightning Seeds	9 July 2021	1.86
242	7	Asim Chaudhry and Rosie Jones	16 July 2021	1.61

==== The Last Leg of Tokyo 2020 ====
This series aired nightly during the 2020 Paralympics, presented live from a studio near the London Stadium with correspondence from comedian Rosie Jones in Tokyo, Japan.

No. overall	No. in series	Guest(s)	Original release date	Viewers (millions)
243	1	Johnny Vegas, Billy Monger, Rachel Morris, Rosie Jones, Clare Balding, Clare Griffiths and Duncan James (Note: Also featured cameos from Joanna Lumley, Rob Beckett, Jamali Maddix, David Tennant, Sara Pascoe, Jon Richardson, Lorraine Kelly, Munya Chawawa and John Bishop.)	24 August 2021	1.04
244	2	Richard Osman, Ruth Madeley, Susie Rodgers, Ade Adepitan, Rosie Jones, Megan Giglia, Joe Wilkinson, Duncan James, Steffan Hughes and Tracey Hinton	25 August 2021	0.98
245	3	Judi Love, Chris McCausland, Sophie Christiansen, Rosie Jones, JJ Chalmers, Kerry Godliman, Anne Dickins and Duncan James	26 August 2021	1.05
246	4	Sue Perkins, Lost Voice Guy, Sam Ruddock, Rosie Jones, Tully Kearney, Louis Rolfe, Mandip Sehmi, Johnny Vegas and Duncan James	27 August 2021	1.02
247	5	Tom Allen, Briony May Williams, Liz Johnson, Jody Cundy, Rosie Jones, Joe Wilkinson, Peter Mitchell and Duncan James	28 August 2021	N/A (<0.97) (Note: Not reported in the weekly top 15 programmes for four-screen viewer ratings.)
248	6	Jimmy Carr, Louise Hunt, Ayaz Bhuta, Aaron Phipps, Jamie Stead, Chris Skelley, Rosie Jones, Mandip Sehmi, Grace Clough, Johnny Vegas and Duncan James	29 August 2021	N/A (<0.97)
249	7	Clara Amfo, Oliver Hynd, Ellie Robinson, Sir Lee Pearson, Rosie Jones, Joe Wilkinson, Mel Nicholls and Duncan James	30 August 2021	N/A (<0.98)
250	8	Phil Wang, Alice Tai, Claire Cashmore, Oliver Lam-Watson, Ben Pritchard, Nick Baker, Giedre Rakauskaite, Ellen Buttrick, Erin Kennedy, Lauren Rowles, Rosie Jones, Dave Clarke, Johnny Vegas and Duncan James	31 August 2021	N/A (<0.98)
251	9	Joe Wilkinson, Louise Sugden, Dimitri Coutya, Kylie Grimes, Aaron Phipps, Jamie Stead, Rosie Jones, Stephen Miller and Duncan James	1 September 2021	1.06
252	10	Ellie Taylor, Ellie Robinson, Olivia Breen, Olivia Broome, Victoria Rumary, Andrew Small, Phoebe Paterson Pine, Dame Sarah Storey, Rosie Jones, Kerry Godliman, Sarah Barrow and Duncan James	2 September 2021	N/A (<0.98)
253	11	Vick Hope, Ali Jawad, Scott Quin, Elliot Stewart, Louise Fiddes, Tully Kearney, Jonathan Broom-Edwards, Rosie Jones, Dan Greaves, Daniel Pembroke, Joe Wilkinson, Richard Hennahane, Mel Clarke and Duncan James	3 September 2021	1.04
254	12	Lorraine Kelly, Jody Cundy, Sir Lee Pearson, Jack Hunter-Spivey, Louise Fiddes, Erin Kennedy, Stephen Bate, Finlay Graham, Eva Guttmann, Rosie Jones, Hannah Cockroft, David Smith, Kerry Godliman, Rhiannon Henry and Duncan James	4 September 2021	1.09

==== Series 23 ====
This series saw the return of live audiences, but still adhering to the Covid rules.

No. overall	No. in series	Guest(s)	Original release date	Viewers (millions)
255	1	James Acaster, Rosie Jones, Ellie Robinson, Tully Kearney, Reece Dunn, Laura Sugar, Jeanette Chippington, Aaron Phipps, Jim Roberts, Chris Skelley, Lauren Rowles, Lorraine Lambert, Jude Hamer, Amy Conroy and Dan Powell	24 September 2021	1.42
256	2	Matt Forde, Maisie Adam, Ellie Robinson and Daniel Craig	1 October 2021	1.56
257	3 (Note: Included a break for Stand Up to Cancer a week later, with the show's Is It Ok? featured in the telethon.)	Guz Khan, Baroness Warsi and Susie Dent	8 October 2021	1.78
258	4	Ruth Madeley and Stephen Merchant	22 October 2021	1.51
259	5	Bill Bailey and Rose Ayling-Ellis	29 October 2021	1.43
260	6	Stacey Dooley, Munya Chawawa, Laura Tobin, Rosie Jones and Krishnan Guru-Murthy	5 November 2021	1.56
261	7	Jodie Whittaker, Darren Harriott and Zippy	12 November 2021	1.53
262	8	Jon Richardson and Judi Love	19 November 2021	1.43
263	9	David Mitchell, Kerry Godliman, Mark Olver and Jessica Robinson	26 November 2021	1.39
264	10	Chris McCausland, London Hughes and Xand van Tulleken	3 December 2021	1.40
265	11	Harry Hill and Desiree Burch	10 December 2021	1.59
266	12	Christmas Special: Joanna Lumley, Big Zuu, Stephen Merchant, Jodie Whittaker, Jon Richardson, Darren Harriott, Ruth Madeley, Guz Khan, James Acaster, Munya Chawawa, Maisie Adam, Rosie Jones and The Darkness	24 December 2021	1.58
267	13	The Last Leg of the Year: Aisling Bea, Nish Kumar, Vick Hope, Joe Wilkinson, Maisie Adam, Ivo Graham and Alex Horne & The Horne Section (Note: .Jodie Whittaker, Stephen Merchant, Judi Love, Richard Ayoade, Joanna Lumley, Harry Hill, Chris McCausland, David Tennant, Sara Pascoe, Guz Khan, Kevin Bridges, AJ Odudu, David Mitchell, Tom Allen, Asim Chaudhry, Rosie Jones, Jon Richardson, Rose Ayling-Ellis and Darren Harriott all appear in the Happy New Year cameo messages.)	31 December 2021	1.62

=== 2022 ===
==== Series 24 ====
No. overall	No. in series	Guest(s)	Original release date	Viewers (millions)
268	1	Nish Kumar, Sandi Toksvig, Basil Brush and The Steve & Ben Somers Country Band	28 January 2022	1.52
269	2	Tom Davis, Judi Love and The Steve & Ben Somers Country Band	4 February 2022	1.18
270	3	Guz Khan and Rosie Jones	11 February 2022	1.16
271	4	Hannah Waddingham and Rose Matafeo	18 February 2022	1.68
272	5	Richard Ayoade, Lorraine Kelly and Eve Muirhead	25 February 2022	1,71
273	6	Hannah Gadsby, Tom Allen, Andrew Parsons, Stefanie Reid and The Steve & Ben Somers Country Band	4 March 2022	1,68
274	7	Rose Ayling-Ellis and Victoria Coren Mitchell	11 March 2022	1,66
275	8	Jack Dee and Ria Lina	18 March 2022	1,42
276	9	Zawe Ashton, James Acaster, Rosie Jones, Tom Allen and The Steve & Ben Somers Country Band	25 March 2022	1,59

==== Series 25 ====
An episode set to air on 9 September 2022, with guests Richard Ayoade and Aisling Bea, was cancelled due to the death of Queen Elizabeth II.

No. overall	No. in series	Guest(s)	Original release date	Viewers (millions)
277	1	Miriam Margolyes, Desiree Burch, Krishnan Guru-Murthy and Jonnie Peacock	15 July 2022	1.65
278	2	Frankie Boyle and Baroness Warsi	22 July 2022	N/A
279	3	Rylan, Jess Phillips, Jason Donovan, Jackie Woodburne, Stefan Dennis, Ryan Moloney, Ian Smith, Shaun Briscoe, Lucy Jones and Some Voices Choir	29 July 2022	1.29
280	4	James Acaster, Alice Tai, Jess Robinson and Some Voices Choir	5 August 2022	1.29
281	5	Asim Chaudhry, Clara Amfo, Matt Forde, Jack Hunter-Spivey, Johnboy Smith and Emmanuel Oyinbo-Coker	12 August 2022	1.14
282	6	Dara Ó Briain, Rosie Jones and Rose Ayling-Ellis	19 August 2022	1.26
283	7	Ed Gamble and Suzi Ruffell	26 August 2022	N/A
284	8	Kerry Godliman, Big Zuu, Rachel Onasanwo, Jonnie Peacock and The Steve & Ben Somers Band (Note: 10th Anniversary special.)	2 September 2022	1.22
285	9	David Harewood and Judi Love	16 September 2022	N/A
286	10	Munya Chawawa, Sara Pascoe, Alastair Campbell, Jess Robinson and Some Voices Choir	23 September 2022	1.29

==== Series 26 ====
No. overall	No. in series	Guest(s)	Original release date	Viewers (millions)
287	1	Peter Crouch, Rose Ayling-Ellis, Phil Wang, Jess Robinson and The Fourth Choir	18 November 2022	1.07
288	2	Richard Ayoade and Susan Wokoma	25 November 2022	1.20
289	3	Matt Forde, London Hughes, Tommy Walsh, Kevin Sinfield, John McFall and Chesney Hawkes (Note: Josh Widdicombe appeared in this episode via Zoom.)	2 December 2022	1.54
290	4	Jimmy Carr and Judi Love	9 December 2022	N/A
291	5	Guz Khan and Thanyia Moore	16 December 2022	N/A
292	6	The Last Leg Christmas Bash: James Acaster, AJ Odudu, Luke Kempner, Janusz Domagala, Syabira Yusoff and Some Voices Choir	23 December 2022	1.65
293	7	The Last Leg of the Year: Rylan, Ellie Simmonds, Tom Davis, Desiree Burch, Baroness Warsi, Mike Wozniak, Sophie Ellis-Bextor, John McFall and the Liz Truss lettuce	31 December 2022	N/A

=== 2023 ===
==== Series 27 ====
No. overall	No. in series	Guest(s)	Original release date	Viewers (millions)
294	1	Lucy Beaumont, Richard Ayoade, Angela Rayner and Tony Callaghan	27 January 2023	1.14
295	2	David Tennant, Michelle de Swarte and "Weird Al" Yankovic	3 February 2023	N/A
296	3	Dara Ó Briain, Vick Hope, Richard Osman, Kate Stanforth and Matthew Rowan	10 February 2023	N/A
297	4	Aisling Bea and Peter Doherty	24 February 2023 (Note: There was no new episode on 17 February 2023 due to the National Comedy Awards airing on Channel 4 during The Last Leg's timeslot.)	N/A
298	5	Frankie Boyle, Josh Pugh and AJ Odudu	3 March 2023	1.37
299	6	David Harewood, Maisie Adam, Chris McCausland, Armando Iannucci and the Bournemouth Symphony Orchestra feat. Felix Klieser	10 March 2023	N/A
300	7	Nish Kumar, Fern Brady, Dave Benson Phillips, Alan Fletcher, Adam Stanton-Wharmby, Beverley Wilson, Jess Veal and The Mariachis	17 March 2023	N/A

==== Series 28 ====
Episodes 8 and 9 of this series were cut due to Channel 4 budget constraints.

No. overall	No. in series	Guest(s)	Original release date	Viewers (millions)
301	1	Miriam Margolyes, Jonathan Ross, Joe Pasquale and Eltonesque	30 June 2023	N/A
302	2	Guz Khan, Suzi Ruffell and Finlay Andrews (Note: Jess Phillips was originally scheduled to be a guest but had to cancel due to illness, so Suzi Ruffell substituted for her.)	7 July 2023	N/A
303	3	Rosie Jones, Babatunde Aléshé, Brian Cox and Redd Pepper	14 July 2023	N/A
304	4	Judi Love, James Crossley and Tim Minchin	21 July 2023	N/A
305	5	Kiell Smith-Bynoe, Mel B, Charlie Baker and James Crossley	28 July 2023	N/A
306	6	Susan Wokoma, Seann Walsh, Chris McCausland, Paul Chuckle and James Crossley	4 August 2023	N/A
307	7	Rose Matafeo, Rylan, James Crossley, Dale Vince and Zippy	11 August 2023	N/A

==== Series 29 ====
The edition on Friday 15 December saw Adam Hills having to host the show from his house, as he tested positive for Covid earlier in the week

No. overall	No. in series	Guest(s)	Original release date	Viewers (millions)
308	1	Jon Richardson, Desiree Burch, Joe Pasquale, TYGERMYLK and Alice Ella & Oli Howe	10 November 2023	N/A
309	2	David Tennant, Thanyia Moore, Alastair Bush and the Ultimate Event Dancers	17 November 2023	N/A
310	3	Katherine Ryan, Nabil Abdulrashid, Martin Lewis and Kitty Scott-Claus	24 November 2023	N/A
311	4	Harry Hill, Chris Packham, Ross Cudmore, Alastair Bush and Jordan Gray and the Ultimate Event Dancers	1 December 2023	N/A
312	5	Kevin Bridges, Sayeeda Warsi, George Santos and the Ultimate Event Dancers	8 December 2023	N/A
313	6	Dame Joanna Lumley, Ahir Shah, James Blunt, David Seaman, Wayne Lineker, Simon Webbe, Josh Pieters, Archie Manners, Suella Braverman, Charlie Baker and the Ultimate Event Dancers (Note: Adam Hills appeared in this episode via Zoom.)	15 December 2023	N/A
314	7	Christmas Special: Tom Davis, Alison Hammond, Joe Pasquale, Craig Glenday, The Cheeky Girls and Tony Mortimer and Some Voices Choir	22 December 2023	N/A
315	8	The Last Leg of the Year: Ed Gamble, Judi Love, Suzi Ruffell, Kiell Smith-Bynoe, Seann Walsh, James Crossley, Harry Baker, John Burleigh, David Tennant, Hadley Smith, Craig Glenday, Harry Hill, Tatsuki Usi, The Dolly Show, Miss Madonna, Bupsi Brown and Eltonesque	31 December 2023	N/A

=== 2024 ===
==== Series 30 ====
No. overall	No. in series	Guest(s)	Original release date	Viewers (millions)
316	1	Rosie Jones, Richard Ayoade and Jemima Packington	16 February 2024	N/A
317	2	Jonathan Ross, Desiree Burch, Shaun Ryder, Howie Dorough and Chesney Hawkes	23 February 2024	N/A
318	3	Jo Brand, Eshaan Akbar, Tanyalee Davis and Paddy Haynes	1 March 2024	N/A
319	4	Lorraine Kelly and Miles Jupp	8 March 2024	N/A
320	5	Mel B, Rob Beckett, Archie Manners, Josh Pieters and The Steve & Ben Somers Country Band	15 March 2024	N/A
321	6	Sir Lenny Henry, Maisie Adam, Paul Rudd, Mckenna Grace, Finn Wolfhard, Ernie Hudson and Charlie Baker	22 March 2024	N/A
322	7	Richard Osman and Jordan Gray	29 March 2024	N/A
323	8	Sara Pascoe, Munya Chawawa, Josh Pugh, Richard Osman, Jody Cundy and Alice Ella	5 April 2024	N/A
324	Special	Sayeeda Warsi, Jonathan Ross, Munya Chawawa, Carol Vorderman, Chris McCausland, Matt Forde, Fatiha El-Ghorri, Barmy Brunch, Jess Phillips, Sir Lindsay Hoyle, Charlie Baker and The Mariachis (Note: Election Special.)	5 July 2024	0.92

==== The Last Leg in Paris 2024 ====
Broadcast during the 2024 Summer Paralympics.

No. overall	No. in series	Guest(s)	Original release date	Viewers (millions)
325	1	Ed Jackson, Rosie Jones and Josh Pugh	28 August 2024	N/A
326	2	Jodie Ounsley, Judi Love and Dan Tiernan	29 August 2024	N/A
327	3	Maisie Adam, Chris McCausland and Rob Walker	30 August 2024	N/A
328	4	Joel Dommett, Helen Skelton, Ade Adepitan and Andrew Parsons	31 August 2024	N/A
329	5	Ellie Simmonds, Alex Horne, Jody Cundy and Kadeena Cox	1 September 2024	N/A
330	6	Matt Lucas, Gabby Logan, Matt Bush, Amy Truesdale, Jodie Grinham, Lisa Nandy and Dan Sultan	2 September 2024	N/A
331	7	Rose Ayling-Ellis, Ivo Graham, Dave Ellis, Megan Richter, Stephen McGuire and Matt Stutzman	4 September 2024	N/A
332	8	Jon Richardson, Fats Timbo, Zoe Newson, Mark Swan, Olivia Broome, Lottie McGuinness and Rob Walker	5 September 2024	N/A
333	9	Vick Hope, Johnny Vegas, Sophie Unwin, Lizzi Jordan, Blaine Hunt, Archie Atkinson and Danni Khan	6 September 2024	N/A
334	10	Steph McGovern, Nabil Abdulrashid, Jonathan Broom-Edwards, Jonnie Peacock, Dame Sarah Storey, Alice Tai and Brock Whiston	7 September 2024	N/A
335	11	Jill Scott, Josh Pugh, Jaco van Gass, Laura Sugar, Emma Wiggs, Jack Eyers and Rob Walker	8 September 2024	N/A

==== Series 31 ====
No. overall	No. in series	Guest(s)	Original release date	Viewers (millions)
336	1	Miriam Margolyes, Phil Wang, StJohn Burkett and The Waeve	25 October 2024	N/A
337	2	Carol Vorderman, Armando Iannucci and Charlie Baker	1 November 2024	N/A
338	3	Frankie Boyle, Desiree Burch, Anthony Scaramucci and Amyl and the Sniffers	8 November 2024	N/A
339	4	Dara Ó Briain, Janine Harouni and Chris McCausland	15 November 2024	N/A
340	5	Harry Hill and Lara Ricote	22 November 2024	N/A
341	6	Lorraine Kelly, Nabil Abdulrashid and Susan Wokoma	29 November 2024	N/A
342	7	Richard Osman and Amy Gledhill	6 December 2024	N/A
343	8	Jameela Jamil, Fin Taylor, Richard Ayoade, Chris McCausland, James Crossley, Ray Eveleigh, Sir Chris Hoy, Dame Sarah Storey, Kevin Sinfield, Billy Monger, Tony Hill, Meryl Praill, Robert Brakewell and Some Voices Choir	13 December 2024	N/A
344	9	Alex Jones, Reverend Richard Coles, Mike Tindall and Reverend and the Makers	20 December 2024	N/A
345	10	The Last Leg of the Year: Chris McCausland, Sandi Toksvig, Guz Khan, AJ Odudu, Natalie Cassidy, Josh Pugh, Kirsty Paterson, Sir Ed Davey, Charlie Baker, Jodie Ounsley, Dan Pembroke, Blaine Hunt, Lauren Rowles, Matt Bush, Hannah Cockroft, Nathan Maguire, Zoe Smith, Matt Grover, Ross Cudmore, Georgia Rutledge, Annabel Kiki, Elaine Brooker, Scott Whitehouse, Paul Gorton, Craig Glenday, Wilf Mould, Harry Hill, Nabil Abdulrashid, Sir Stephen Fry, Mel B, Stephen Merchant, James Crossley and DJ Luck & MC Neat	31 December 2024	N/A

=== 2025 ===
==== Series 32 ====
No. overall	No. in series	Guest(s)	Original release date	Viewers (millions)
346	1	Kevin Bridges, GK Barry, Jamie Lee Matthias, Alison Greene and Charlie Baker	24 January 2025	N/A
347	2	Brian Cox, Michelle Wolf, Amy Hart, Harriet Rose, Georgia Wood and Maddie Grace Jepson	31 January 2025	N/A
348	3	Sir Stephen Fry, Sophie Willan, Jamie Lee Matthias and Franz Ferdinand	7 February 2025	N/A
349	4	Nabil Abdulrashid, Suzi Ruffell, Jamie Laing, Sandi Toksvig, Mr. Blobby and Kitty Scott-Claus	14 February 2025	N/A
350	5	Sir Lenny Henry, Oti Mabuse, Jamali Maddix, Lorraine Kelly, Alastair Campbell, Hannah Cockroft, Rosie Jones, Ellie Simmonds, Charlie Baker and Jess Robinson	21 February 2025	N/A
351	6	Gyles Brandreth, Judi Love and Lewis MacLeod	28 February 2025	N/A
352	7	Angela Barnes, Anthony Scaramucci, The Mariachis and Pete Doherty	7 March 2025	N/A
353	8	Rose Ayling-Ellis, Eshaan Akbar, Alastair Campbell and The Mariachis	14 March 2025	N/A
354	9	Sir Grayson Perry, Maisie Adam and Jess Robinson	21 March 2025	N/A
355	10	Roisin Conaty, Tom Davis and Charlie Baker	28 March 2025	N/A

==== Series 33 ====
Episodes 11 & 12 were moved to Wednesday to broadcast as a Christmas Special and The Last Leg of the Year.

No. overall	No. in series	Guest(s)	Original release date	Viewers (millions)
356	1	Frank Skinner, Stevie Martin and Big John Fisher	17 October 2025	N/A
357	2	Richard Ayoade, Laura Smyth and Catherine Bohart	24 October 2025	N/A
358	3	Joel Dommett, Desiree Burch and The Mariachis	31 October 2025	N/A
359	4	GK Barry, Judi Love, Zack Polanski and Chris McCausland	7 November 2025	N/A
360	5	Richard Osman, Rosie Jones and Mike Wozniak	14 November 2025	N/A
361	6	Katherine Ryan, Harriet Kemsley and Sara Cox	21 November 2025	N/A
362	7	Chris McCausland, Rose Ayling-Ellis and Adam Buxton	28 November 2025	N/A
363	8	Guz Khan, Amy Gledhill, Alan Carr, Clare Balding, Greg Davies, Alex Horne, Nish Kumar, Claudia Winkleman, Tom Daley, Dermot Murnaghan and Jason Fox	5 December 2025	N/A
364	9	Jon Richardson, Matt Forde, AJ Odudu, Fay Crockett, Celia Imrie, Tim Pusey, David Spencer, Chris Stephenson, Charlotte Gower and The Mariachis (Note: Stand Up to Cancer special - due to Adam Hills's hosting commitments, Josh Widdicombe and Alex Brooker present this episode.)	12 December 2025	N/A
365	10	Fatiha El-Ghorri, Roisin Conaty, Gavin Lilley and The Music Man Project	19 December 2025	N/A
366	11	The Last Leg of Christmas Eve: Harry Hill, Alison Hammond, Brian Cox, Darrell Hooper, Sir Ed Davey and Rick Astley	24 December 2025	N/A
367	12	The Last Leg of the Year: Sir Lenny Henry, Phil Wang, Maisie Adam, Dani Dyer, Lucy Bronze, Hannah Botterman, Joe Marler, Archie Franks, Frank Illett, Sue Dorrington, Benjamin Mee and Alex James' Britpop Classical & Pete Doherty	31 December 2025	N/A

=== 2026 ===
==== Series 34 ====
No. overall	No. in series	Guest(s)	Original release date	Viewers (millions)
368	1	Tom Davis, Ellie Taylor, Leslie Ash and Matt Prior	30 January 2026	N/A
369	2	Grayson Perry, Judi Love, Charlie Baker, Emma Hignett and Tyler Ballgame	6 February 2026	N/A
370	3	Brian Cox, Mark Williams and Flo & Joan	13 February 2026	N/A
371	4	Bridget Christie, Chloe Petts, Charlie Baker, Lisa-Marie Walters and Adore Dance	20 February 2026	N/A
372	5	Zack Polanski, Jason Manford, Bella Hull, Lou Sanders, Hannah Spencer, Charlie Baker and Adore Dance	27 February 2026	N/A
373	6	The Last Leg of Milan-Cortina: Jamali Maddix, Vittorio Angelone, Dame Penny Mordaunt, Millie Knight and Honey G	6 March 2026	N/A
374	7	The Last Leg of Milan-Cortina: Richard Ayoade, Michelle Wolf, Henry Paker, Sandy Sandilands, Jason Kean, Jo Butterfield and Bupsi Brown	13 March 2026	N/A
375	8	The Last Leg of Milan-Cortina: Jack Dee, GK Barry, Jason Williamson, Menna Fitzpatrick, Nina Sparks. Hester Poole, Paul Chuckle, Matt Forde, Peter Dickson, Danny Jones, Claire Sweeney and Adore Dance	20 March 2026	N/A
376	9	Nabil Abdulrashid, Charlotte Church, Becky Coleman, Ellie Betteridge, Kate Bowers, Emma Brown, Danielle Evans, Natasha Hamm, Louise Hogan, Lucindha Lawson, Sophie Mernagh, Maisie O'Shea, Lucy Sholes, Faye Williams, Macie White and Zara Musker	27 March 2026	N/A
377	10	Josh Pugh, Lorraine Kelly, Steve Bracknall, Becky Coleman, Lisa-Marie Walters and Adore Dance	3 April 2026	N/A

==== Series 35 ====
No. overall	No. in series	Guest(s)	Original release date	Viewers (millions)
378	1	Tim Minchin, Ellie Taylor and Alice Cooper	16 October 2026	N/A
379	2	Roisin Conaty and Finlay Christie	23 October 2026	N/A
380	3	Katherine Ryan, Dan Tiernan, Matt Crossen, David Porcher, Jack Rutter, the England Cerebral Palsy Football Team, Mary Earps, Alessia Russo, Jamie Redknapp, Dame Sarah Storey, Steven Gerrard, Rosie Jones, Hannah Cockroft, Micah Richards and Kings of the Stone Age	30 October 2026	TBD
381	4	Desiree Burch, Harry Shearer, Big John Fisher and Paul Merson	6 November 2026	TBD
382	5	Harriet Dyer, Josh Pugh, Suzi Ruffell, Chris McCausland, Rosie Jones, Sean Jackson, Jamie Tregaskiss, TJ Yates, Cambo Cray, Foyle Rumble, Ivo Graham, Harriet Kemsley	13 November 2026	TBD
383	6	Chris McCausland, Lucy Beaumont, Nish Kumar, Luisa Omielan, Lewis King and Joe Coyd (Note: McCausland was a guest host in place of Widdicombe, who was filming Strictly Come Dancing.)	20 November 2026	TBD
384	7	Bella Hull and Jack Dee	27 November 2026	TBD
385	8	Harry Hill and Kyla Cobbler	4 December 2026	TBD
386	9	Michael Gove, Dylan Moran and Catherine Bohart	11 December 2026	TBD
