= Martin Burleigh =

English footballer (1951–2021)

Personal information
- Full name: Martin Stewart Burleigh
- Date of birth: 2 February 1951
- Place of birth: Willington, County Durham, England
- Date of death: 27 September 2021 (aged 70)
- Position: Goalkeeper

Senior career*
Years	Team	Apps	(Gls)
196?–1968	Willington		
1968–1974	Newcastle United	11	(0)
1974	→ Darlington (loan)	9	(0)
1974–1975	Darlington	21	(0)
1975–1977	Carlisle United	26	(0)
1977–1979	Darlington	71	(0)
1979–1982	Hartlepool United	84	(0)
1982–1983	Bishop Auckland		
1983–1984	Spennymoor United		
1984–1985	Langley Park		
- * Club domestic league appearances and goals

Martin Stewart Burleigh (2 February 1951 – 27 September 2021) was an English professional footballer who made 222 appearances in the Football League playing as a goalkeeper for Newcastle United, Darlington, Carlisle United and Hartlepool United.

== Life and career ==
Burleigh was born in Willington, County Durham. He played football for his local club, Willington A.F.C., before joining Newcastle United as a 17-year-old on amateur forms in October 1968. He replaced the injured Dave Clarke in a strong Newcastle team for Barrie Thomas's testimonial match in November, and turned professional in December. Burleigh was a member of the Newcastle United youth team that won the 1969 Rotterdam International Youth Tournament, defeating Arsenal's youngsters in the final.

He made his first-team debut on 26 December 1970, in a 3–0 defeat away to Leeds United in the First Division, and Leeds' manager, Don Revie, was complimentary: "I thought he had a fine game. He had no chance with the goals. Some of the saves he made showed he has a fine future ahead of him". Burleigh had to wait over a year before making another senior appearance; his home debut came on 8 January 1972 in a 4–2 league victory over Coventry City.

An injury to undisputed first-choice goalkeeper Iam McFaul in February 1973 allowed Burleigh a run of games in the first team, which ended when his left index finger was broken by a kick from Mick Channon during a 1–1 draw away to Southampton and he was ruled out for the rest of the season. A dispute with manager Joe Harvey stemming from his return to pre-season training seriously overweight caused him to walk out of the club. He returned, but played only twice more, the last of his 15 first-team appearances for Newcastle coming on 11 May 1974 against Tottenham Hotspur at St James' Park. When he again reported overweight for the 1974–75 season, the club threatened to cancel his contract, at which point he resigned and considered joining the RAF.

The club retained Burleigh's Football League registration, loaned him to Fourth Division club Darlington in October 1974, and made the transfer permanent in December for a fee reported as £3,000 plus 50% of the profit on any future sale. He spent that season as Darlington's first-choice goalkeeper, and then moved on to Carlisle United, newly relegated to the Second Division, in June 1975. Although a transfer request was accepted in November that same year, Burleigh remained with Carlisle until 1977. He then returned to Darlington for a further two-year spell, in the first of which he was the club's player of the season. He finished his professional career with three seasons at Fourth Division Hartlepool United, for whom he made 96 appearances in all competitions, before moving into non-league football in 1982 with Bishop Auckland, and then playing for Spennymoor United and Langley Park.

After his professional football career ended, Burleigh worked as a painter and decorator based in Ferryhill, County Durham. He died on 27 September 2021 at the age of 70.

In September 2022 a memorial bench was unveiled by The Toon Legends Club at The Manor House, Ferryhill

== Honours ==
Newcastle United

- Anglo-Italian Cup: 1973
