= The Royal World =

- Genre: Reality television
- Presented by: Archie Manners
- Country of origin: United Kingdom
- Original language: English
- No. of seasons: 1
- No. of episodes: 6

Production
- Executive producers: Orr Barker; Iestyn Barker; Andrew Jackman
- Production location: United Kingdom
- Running time: 60 minutes

Original release
- Network: MTV
- Release: 8 November – 12 December 2018

The Royal World is a reality television series that debuted on MTV International in November 2018. The show was announced in July 2018 as a six-episode, hour-long program produced by Initial, part of the Endemol Shine Group. The executive producers are Orr Barker and Iestyn Barker of MTV, and Andrew Jackman of Initial. The show was filmed in the United Kingdom and features its cast members living together "for one summer in the English countryside".

== Cast ==
The Royal World is hosted by Archie Manners, a professional magician. It features a cast of ten men and women who claim to be members of royal or noble families, or somehow acquainted with members of royal or noble families.

Name	Description	References
Tyler Dooley	Dooley is a marijuana grower who is the half-nephew of the Duchess of Sussex.	
Jessica Heydel	Heydel, who was born in the United Kingdom but raised in Russia, claimed in 2015 to be the successor to two baronies. On the show's website she claims three baronies.	
Adeniyi "Niyi" Obafemi Olopade	Niyi is one of 15 children of 92 year-old Jonathan Adioobafemi Olopade, who claims to be related to Jacob Olopade, one of several thousand tribal rulers in Nigeria.	
Camilla Beresford	Beresford is the daughter of the Marquess of Waterford.	
Zara Zoffany Farida Sassoon-Munns	According to the show's website, Sassoon-Munns is a "party girl who’s lived in luxury hotels until she was 15" [sic].	
Michael Campbell	Campbell is the adopted son of Georgia Arianna Campbell, who – prior to her adoption of him – was married for 14 months to the younger son of the Duke of Argyll. His brother, Dimitri, also appears on the show. According to Campbell "what makes me royal is that I'm a count". (Note: The title "count" is a title of nobility, not a title of royalty. It is also non-existent among the British peerage, earl being the closest equivalent.) According to Campbell, his family home is at Castle Goring. Castle Goring is a wedding rental venue owned by his adopted mother in Sussex.	
Dimitri Campbell	Campbell is the adopted son of Georgia Arianna Campbell, who – prior to her adoption of him – was married for 14 months to the younger son of the Duke of Argyll. His brother, Michael, also appears on the show. Campbell refers to himself as a "count".	
Daniel MacLaurin	According to the show's website, MacLaurin is a "member of the Clan Maclaurin". (Note: On the clan's website, Daniel Maclaurin is not identified as the extant chief nor a member of the chief's immediate family.)	
Sienna Rose Myson	According to the show's website, Myson once "rode horses with Zara Phillips".	
Maria Gabrilella Diana	According to the show's website, Diana is the daughter of an unspecified "Italian nobleman of Neapolitan heritage".	
