= Joe Stilgoe =

English singer, pianist and songwriter (born 1979)

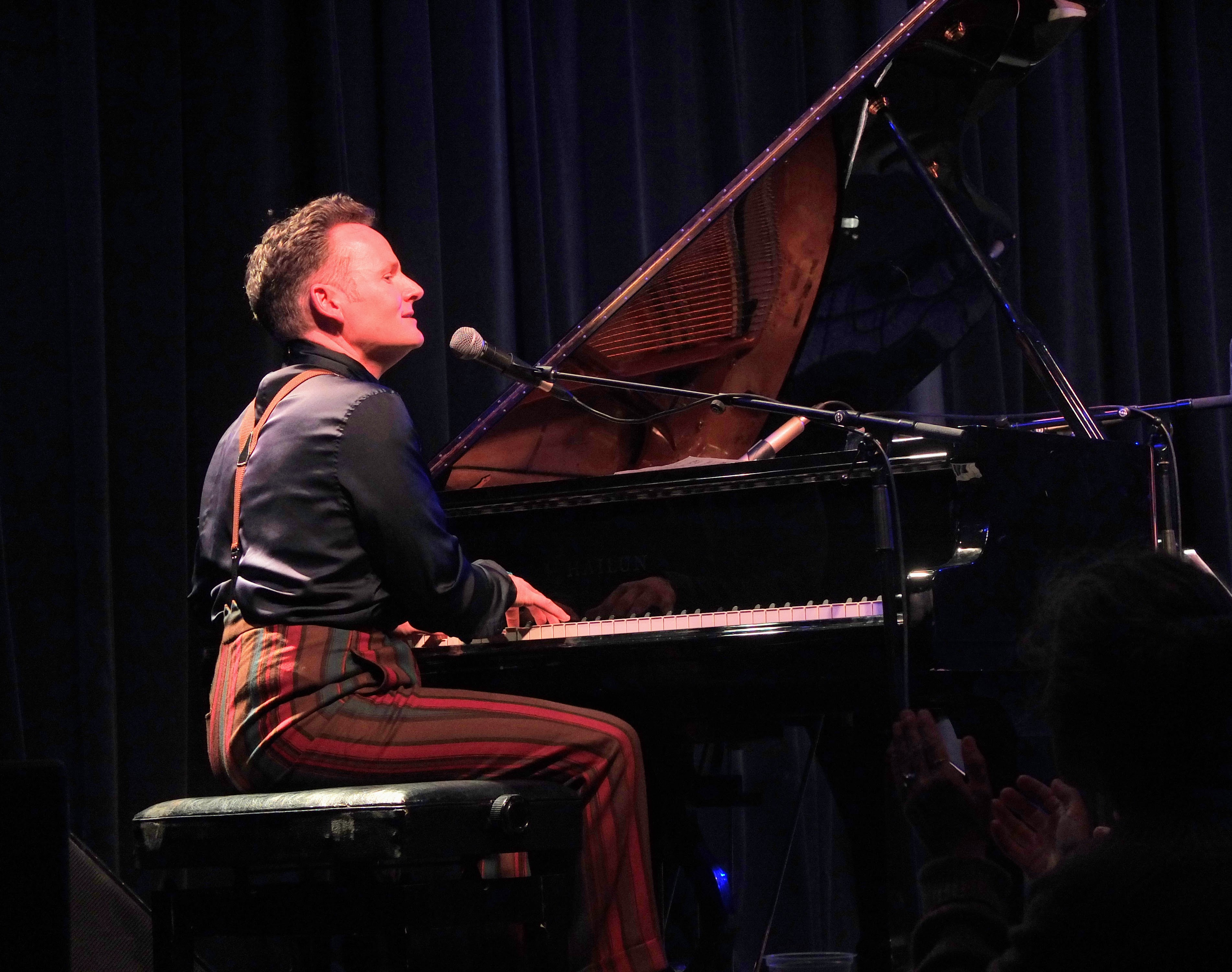

Background information
- Born: 29 May 1979 (age 47); Sevenoaks, Kent, England
- Genres: Swing, blues, pop
- Occupations: Musician, songwriter
- Labels: Candid, NSA Productions; management: Nick Stewart & Associates
- Website: www.joestilgoe.com

Joe Stilgoe (born 29 May 1979) is an English singer, pianist and songwriter.

== Early life and education ==
Stilgoe was born in Sevenoaks, Kent. He is the son of the lyricist and entertainer Richard Stilgoe, and opera singer Annabel Hunt.

Educated at Sevenoaks School, Stilgoe went on to study music at the University of Southampton achieving a First Class degree. After spending a year performing on cruise ships, Stilgoe continued his musicianship at Trinity College of Music.

== Musical career ==
Stilgoe has released multiple studio albums, several of which have reached No. 1 on the UK Jazz Chart. Stilgoe performs both as a solo artist and with ensembles, and has appeared with orchestras including the BBC Concert Orchestra, the Hallé, and the Royal Philharmonic Orchestra.

== Recording career ==
Stilgoe has released ten solo albums across his career. Several of his recordings have reached No. 1 on the UK Jazz Chart.

In 2022, he released the album Theatre, which was recorded with the Metropole Orkest and launched at the Barbican with the BBC Concert Orchestra.

In 2026, he released Welcome to the Club, a collaboration with clarinettist Giacomo Smith.

== Performance and touring ==
Stilgoe is a regular live performer in the United Kingdom and internationally. His work includes concert tours, theatre productions, and performances with major orchestras. He collaborates frequently with English jazz musician Guy Barker, notably co-writing three songs in Barker's recent suite for big band Inferno 67, which premiered at Ronnie Scott's.

He collaborates with orchestras including the BBC Concert Orchestra, The Halle, The Royal Philharmonic Orchestra, The John Wilson Orchestra and has a strong relationship with the RTE Concert Orchestra, with whom he toured Ireland in 2026 with his first headline show.

His stage productions include A Tribute to Gene Kelly, Songs on Film, Songs On Film The Sequel, and performances with his big band. In 2026, he toured the UK with singer Liza Pulman in Hooray for Hollywood, which concluded with a run in London's West End.

He collaborates frequently with Hannah Waddingham, appearing with her and the London Community Gospel Choir in 2024 to open the Olivier Awards and also that year at the BAFTA film awards.

He curated intimate shows at cabaret club Crazy Coqs featured collaborations with several celebrities, including Harry Hill, Rufus Hound, Sharon D Clarke, Mel Giedroyc, Rob Brydon and Damian Lewis.

He has also performed at high-profile private events, including many appearances in the presence of the royal family.

== Broadcasting and other work ==
In the pandemic of 2020, Stilgoe launched Stilgoe In The Shed, an online performance series that attracted over 250,000 viewers worldwide and raised money for a local NHS charity.

He was a founder member of The Horne Section, leaving the group after the BBC Radio 4 series Alex Horne Presents The Horne Section, for which Stilgoe wrote many of the songs.

He has presented for BBC Radio 2 and 3 and is a regular on Radio 4's Add To Playlist.

BBC Radio 2 - Joe Stilgoe Live At The Lyric, Jingle Bell Joe (featuring Caro Emerald, Damian Lewis, Cerys Matthews), One Night Stand at Ronnie Scotts (an un-broadcast pilot featuring Tim Minchin, Heather Headley, Denis King, SK Shlomo).

Jazz FM - The Arrangers, Joe Stilgoe's Christmas.

== Composition and theatre work ==
In addition to his performing career, Stilgoe has composed music for theatre productions, including adaptations of The Jungle Book with Jessica Swale and Max Webster, and David Walliams’ The Midnight Gang at Chichester Festival Theatre .

He has collaborated with Julia Donaldson on stage adaptations of Zog, Zog and the Flying Doctors, and The Baddies. He is also developing new musical theatre projects, including Hooked, with Gary Barlow and Jason Manford.

== Discography ==
Studio albums

- I Like This One (2008)
- We Look to the Stars (2012)
- Songs on Film (2014)
- New Songs for Old Souls (2015)
- Songs on Film: The Sequel (2016)
- The Heat Is On! (2019)
- Joe Stilgoe's Christmas Album (2019)
- Stilgoe in the Shed (2020)
- Theatre (2022)
- Welcome to the Club (2025)

Collaborations and appearances

- Our Kind of Music (with Michael Parkinson, 2017)
- A Swinging Big Band Christmas (2017)
- Time and Place (with Claire Martin 2014)
- A Couple of Swells (with Liza Pulman 2024)
