= Charlie Baker (comedian) =

British comedian, actor, and singer

- Occupations: Actor, singer and presenter
- Children: 2

Charlie Baker is a British comedian, actor, singer and presenter.

== Early and personal life ==
Baker is from Newton Abbot, Devon in the south west of England.

== Career ==
=== Comedy ===
As a comedy performer Baker has frequently showcased his singing skills. In his 2011 play Wedding Band he played the singer in a wedding band. In Baker's Dozen he sang best-selling number ones from every year between 2000 and 2012. The show was initially performed at the 2013 Edinburgh Festival before being toured around the UK. At the 2016 Edinburgh Festival Baker's show Just the One celebrated his then only child and musical one-hit wonders. His 2017 show The Hit-Polisher honoured hits from the '80s, '90s and '00s and their associated memories. In 2018 at Edinburgh, Baker performed in a children's play called The Greatest Goat of All Time. Since 2017, Baker has often sung comedy songs on Channel 4's The Last Leg.

=== Radio ===
An avid sports fan, Baker presents on Talksport regularly with Paul Hawksbee in the 1 pm to 4 pm slot, as well as hosting the Gameday Warm-Up every Saturday from 9 am to 11 am alongside Max Rushden. Baker supports Torquay United FC and presents the podcast The National Obsession, about his experiences supporting Torquay. He has guested on football podcast Quickly Kevin, Will He Score? Baker has also appeared on BBC Radio shows Fighting Talk, and Alex Horne Presents The Horne Section. He has appeared as a guest on the Two Shot Podcast. Since 2015 Baker has also provided voiceover for Radio X, voicing pre-recorded jingles, show promotions and the news intro.

=== Actor ===
As an actor he has had minor roles in sitcoms including Miranda and The IT Crowd. He has been a team captain on the Channel 4 panel show A Short History Of Everything Else. He also became a regular guest on Richard Bacon's Beer & Pizza Club, and won Let's Dance For Comic Relief in 2011. Baker has also appeared in EastEnders, Doctors, Doctor Who and The Boy in the Striped Pyjamas.
