= The Horne Section =

British musical comedy band

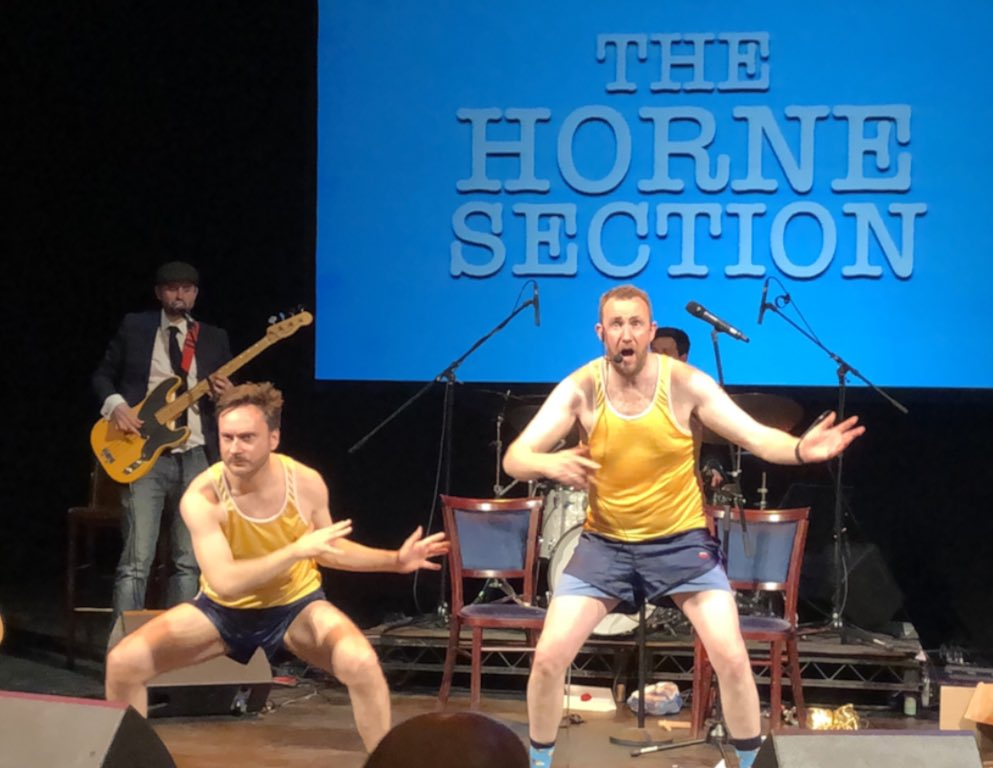
- The Horne Section playing live in Buxton, May 2019

Background information
- Genre: Musical comedy
- Years active: 2010–present
- Members: Alex Horne; Joe Auckland; Mark Brown; Will Collier; Ben Reynolds; Ed Sheldrake
- Past members: Joe Stilgoe
- Website: https://www.thehornesection.com/

The Horne Section is a British musical comedy band, appearing on radio, television, podcast, and stage. Led by frontman and comedian Alex Horne, the band comprises Joe Auckland (trumpet, banjo, vocals), Mark Brown (saxophone, guitar, vocals), Will Collier (bass, guitar, vocals), Ben Reynolds (drums, vocals) and Ed Sheldrake (keyboards, piano, vocals). The band specialises in comedy/spoof songs in a variety of genres. The band is made up of professional musicians, including two childhood friends of Horne, and first performed together in May 2010, with the current line-up finalised during 2012. The Horne Section have performed at the Edinburgh Festival, as well as touring the UK, and celebrity guests at their shows have included Harry Hill, Simon Amstell, Jimmy Carr, Tim Minchin, Josie Long, Al Murray, and John Oliver as well as musicians including Neil Hannon and Suggs. Their BBC Radio 4 series – Alex Horne Presents the Horne Section – ran for three series from 2012 to 2014. The band have also released five albums of music.

The Horne Section Podcast has run since 2018. It was in the top 10 most streamed podcasts from the Deezer platform in 2018, and in April 2019 it was nominated in the 'Best Comedy' category of the British Podcast Awards. The podcast has featured a range of guests including comedians (Greg Davies, Roisin Conaty, Sara Pascoe, Nish Kumar, Adam Buxton), presenters (Richard Osman, Susie Dent, Angellica Bell), sportspeople (Chris Hoy, Lizzy Yarnold), performance poets (Rob Auton, Tim Key, Scroobius Pip), and musicians (Jessie Ware, David Arnold, Robbie Williams).

The Horne Section performing for an audience of children in 2012

The band featured in The Horne Section Christmas, a nine-minute Christmas-carol themed TV special, shown on Sky Arts in 2015. In April 2018 they recorded a two-hour live show at the London Palladium entitled The Horne Section Television Programme, featuring celebrity guests including Sue Perkins and Nadine Coyle, and broadcast on Dave on 24 May 2018. A Channel 4 six-part programme The Horne Section TV Show was released on 3 November 2022, and is a mostly scripted comedy about the band, combining elements of musical comedy, talk show and sitcom.

Horne and the band have often appeared on 8 Out of 10 Cats Does Countdown as the dictionary corner guest, and chaired Never Mind the Buzzcocks in November 2012. The Horne Section were the 'house band' for The Last Leg of the Year on New Year's Eve 2018, 2019, 2020 and 2021, where they contributed backing music as well as playing a number of their own songs. They provided music for the lockdown-themed series The Last Leg: Locked Down Under and Peter Crouch: Save Our Summer in 2020, and joined Crouch again in 2021 for Crouchy's Year-Late Euros: Live. The band created the theme music for Horne's Taskmaster, as well as for The Guardian's cricket podcast The Spin.

== Album discography ==
These albums (and the single "Grandaddy") are distributed by the group's Bandcamp page. The third album was released on 5 June 2020 featuring songs from the isolation podcasts. The band also have a Patreon which gives subscribers to commission short songs and have shout-outs.

Released	Music featured
2010	The Horne Section Journey To Happy, The Horne Section, Battleships, Advice For A Student, The Hair Suite, Sidemen, The Egg Sketch, Friends Forever (Album also features poetry and a conversation with Tim Key. The pianist is former member Joe Stilgoe.)
2018	Three Great Songs and Eight More Songs Chinese Five Spice, Chris Hoy Loves A Saveloy, Drum and Bass, Happy Accident, If I Were, Is it the Police?, Less is More, Record Player, Seasons, Small Talk, Hardness of Water (Alex Horne performs a spoken-word narration about the album and songs, with piano accompaniment, between each track.)
2020	The Most Beautiful, Talented People In The Whole World Introduction, Summer Banger (2020), Hear the Word (Joe), Pam Ayres Eats Pom Bears, Savvy, Joan Armatrading, I Smell a Rat, Those Were the Days, Shredded Wheat, One Lump or Two, Crossed Wires, Newton's Laws, Road Safety, Hear the Word (Alex), Time Wasting, Blessings, Manifesto, Phobias, The President, Hear The Word (Ed), Children Say The Funniest Things, I Smell a Rat (Club Mix), Spool Fools, Hat Mancock, I Miss People, The Angry Chef, Hear the Word (Ben), Monkey Music
2020	The Horne Section Christmas Family Album Introduction, Fiddly Christmas, Being With You, Buckaroo Intro, Buckaroo, Cabbage, Christmas Number 2, Connect 4 Intro, Connect 4, Dinosaur, Guess Who Intro, Guess Who, Head Shoulders Etc., Manger Danger, Monger, Midnight Intro, Midnight, Monday Tuesday..., Noel, A Thing, There Was A Dog, Midwinter Monkey
2021	ULTRABULK Donkeys, No Chairs, Ain't Got No Scruples, Flies On You, Um Bongo, Worm, Love Triangle, Time v Persons, Legacy, Ten Million Henrys, A Lesson In Humility, Mumford, Midnight Feast, Drive On, Sensible Guy, Potaconut, The Mighty Andrew Marr, Midnight Farts, Funny Old Game, UFO Jingle (Extended Version), I Am Funny, 12 Days Of Yoga

== Alex Horne Presents The Horne Section ==
Alex Horne Presents The Horne Section was a BBC Radio 4 show that ran from 2011 to 2014 and was broadcast in the 6.30pm weekday comedy slot. The programme followed a similar format to the live Edinburgh festival shows with Horne and the band performing songs and jokes in front of a live audience, with assistance from a special guest - usually from the world of comedy. The pianist during series 1 was former member Joe Stilgoe, and from series 2 onwards was Ed Sheldrake.

=== Pilot (2011) ===
Episode	Guest	Broadcast	Music featured
1.0 (Pilot)	Benedict Allen	14 Mar 2011	Ode to Kim's Retirement, I Got Rhythm, Song for Richard (Just Doing My Job), Let the Credits Roll

=== Series 1 (2012) ===
Episode	Guest	Broadcast	Music featured
1.1	David O'Doherty	5 Mar 2012	Those Were the Days (Of the Week), Sidemen, Spotlight on a Musical Instrument (piano), Latin Song + Italian Music Terms Song, Everybody Speaks English, Let the Credits Roll
1.2	Nick Helm	12 Mar 2012	Bald Man, One Man and His Dog, The Attenboroughs, Dinosaur Song, Love Holds the Power (Helm), Spotlight on a Musical Instrument (trumpet), Friend Forever (Rebel’s Song)
1.3	Isy Suttie	19 Mar 2012	Ode to Jens’ Beard, Groupies, The Hardness of Water, The Maiden and the Slovenian Prince (Suttie), Battleships, Spotlight on a Musical Instrument (double bass), Party for all Human Kind
1.4	Kevin Eldon	26 Mar 2012	Ode to Tash’s Fashion Sense, Coles' Law, English Food, CABBAGE, Eggy Pop, Potholing Song (Eldon), Spotlight on a Musical Instrument (drums), Kitchen Drums, Horne Section Diet

A bonus episode recorded from the Edinburgh Festival was broadcast later that year.

Episode	Guest	Broadcast	Music featured
1.5 (ES)	Al Murray & Tim Key	2 Sep 2012	Rolling Up to Edinburgh, Connect 4, Song for Swanee Whistle, Pancake Day, Incy Wincy Spider (Murray), Scottish Medley

=== Series 2 (2013) ===
Episode	Theme	Guest	Broadcast	Music featured
2.1	Games	Danny Baker	24 Feb 2013	Chess, The Classified Scores, Chris Hoy Loves a Saveloy, Writers' Corner: Cricket Match, Flash Bang Wallop (Baker), Musician Under a Microscope (Ben), Ready to Run
2.2	Body	Phill Jupitus and Lady Lykez	3 Mar 2013	Light Musical Exercise, Joe’s Diet, Musician Under a Microscope (Joe), Focus on a Note (A), Dream Man (Joe), Hit Me With Your Rhythm Stick (Jupitus), They've All Grown Up in the Beano (Jupitus), Shampoo Promises, Catarrh, Just a Man with a Beard
2.3	Love	Charlie Baker	10 Mar 2013	Twister, Chat Up Lines Song, Spotlight on a Musical Instrument (flute), Drum & Bass, Bognor Girl, Love Song Medley
2.4	Destiny	Nick Mohammed	17 Mar 2013	Bouncer from Neighbours, Focus on a Note (E), How They Met Ed at the Disco Party, Card Magic Music, Dream Man (Mark), Allergies, Tribute Band Tribute, Deliverance Duel
2.5	Children	Doc Brown	24 Mar 2013	Head Shoulders Knees and Toes, He Weed in His Mouth, Watershed, Writers' Corner: The Dragon, Parenting Rap (Brown), Top Ten Musical Notes, Bagface, New Alphabet Song, Whale Rap (Brown), Alex’s Reggae Song
2.6	Seasons	Matt Lucas and Liane Carroll	31 Mar 2013	Vivaldi’s 4 Seasons Pizza, Focus on a Note (C), Doodlebot, Hip Hop Song (Lucas), Baked Potato Song (Lucas), Seasons, Dream Man (Ben), Fly Me to the Moon (Ping Pong), Spotlight on a Musical Instrument (triangle), Irish Medley

A New Year's Eve Special episode was broadcast at the end of 2013.

Episode	Guest	Broadcast	Music featured
NYES	Milton Jones, Jenny Bede & Beardyman	31 Dec 2013	This Is Not the Show (This Is Just the Intro), Manger Danger, Chinese Five Spice, Christmas Jumper (Bede), No-L, Party Like We're Parents, Brussels Sprout Blues (Beardyman), Long Old Sign

=== Series 3 (2014) ===
Episode	Theme	Guest	Broadcast	Music featured
3.1	Technology	Sara Pascoe & James Acaster	6 May 2014	Henry Hoover, Record Player, Sara Pascoe: The Musical, Purse Thief, Folk Song, Mariachi Music (Acaster), I’m Your Teasmade, Autotune
3.2	Home	Tom Basden	13 May 2014	Song for Suzie, Yonder Hill, A Musician’s Life, Writer's Corner: "My Life in the Premier League" by Wayne Rooney, Jacques Villeneuve, Tom's songs (Basden), Squirrel Song, Radiator Wisdom
3.3	Fashion	Marcus Brigstocke & Vula Malinga	20 May 2014	Working on My Twerking, Ed’s Supermarket Song, Marcus’s song, Coleman's, Car Song, Jazzy Vula Malinga, Alex’s Duet with Vula, First Dance Song, Happy Accident
3.4	Shopping	Adam Buxton & Pete Grogan	27 May 2014	Song for Simon, If I Were, Thailand, Adam’s songs, Thick & Creamy (Milk advert), Cheese Dreams, I Ain’t Got No Story to Tell, Biscuits Sea Shanty
3.5	Tudors	Cariad Lloyd & Gwyneth Herbert	3 Jun 2014	Small Talk (from Milk the Tenderness), Cariad’s song, Time Wasting (Will’s Inspirational Motivational Song), Gwyneth’s song, Marching Nursery Rhyme, Prequel to Copacabana, Song for Alex’s Son (When You’re 6 Foot 4), Woody’s Weigh-In, Tudors vs Vikings
3.6	Aliens	Terry Alderton	10 Jun 2014	Fortune Teller, Aliens Exist, Is it the Police?, Don’t You Want Me 2 (Do You Still Not Want Me?), Terry’s song, Spanish Flu, Ed’s Dilemma, The Fly, Is it a Gun?, Ode to Tim the Manly Man

== Television appearances ==
=== 8 Out of 10 Cats Does Countdown (2013–present) ===
8 Out of 10 Cats Does Countdown is a panel show combining the longstanding Channel 4 game format of Countdown with the lively comedy style of 8 Out of 10 Cats. Each episode introduces a celebrity guest as an assistant to etymologist Susie Dent in 'dictionary corner'. Alex Horne was previously a contestant on the main Countdown programme in 2008, and as the author of a book on 'Wordwatching' was a strong candidate for the role. More unusually, he brought his backing band, and The Horne Section contributed various comedy song (and dance) items to the show, as well as stylistic parodies of the 30-second Countdown music.

The Horne Section have appeared in a number of episodes (with one appearance as Rachel Riley's assistants) over the course of the show, listed below with reference to the 8 Out of 10 Cats Does Countdown episodes page. The saxophonist 'Pedro' (Pete Grogan) appeared where shown as a deputy for one of the wind players.

Episode	First broadcast	Teams' guests	Members	Music items
9	12 Sep 2013	Lee Mack / Bob Mortimer, Adam Hills	Joe, Ben, Will only	Countdown music, Drum and Bass, Samba Countdown, Hillbilly Countdown, Bagface, Jazz Countdown
25	12 Sep 2014	Trevor Noah, David Baddiel / Joey Essex (Dictionary Corner)	Regular members	Is It the Police?, Ragtime Countdown, Disco Countdown, James Bond Countdown
27	29 Dec 2014	Kathy Burke, David Baddiel	Regular members	No-L, Carols Countdown, Macarena, Henry Hoover, Original Lyrics Countdown
39	19 Jun 2015	Vic Reeves, Lee Mack / Sara Pascoe	Regular members	Your Love Keeps Lifting Me Hiya, Eggypop, German Drinking Countdown, CABBAGE
40	26 Jun 2015	Bob Mortimer, Sarah Millican / Katherine Ryan	Pedro (for Mark)	I Ain't Got No Story To Tell, Salsa Countdown, Baker Street, Benny Hill Countdown, Trumpet Magic
49	28 Aug 2015	Sara Pascoe, Josh Widdicombe / Alex Brooker	Pedro (for Mark)	Background music, Brown-Eyed Girl, Ska Countdown, Children's Instrument Countdown, Zumba
55	5 Feb 2016	Isy Suttie, Richard Osman	Regular members	Scotland advert, Film Themes Countdown, Mexican Countdown, Lovely Day, Bottles Countdown, Seasons
69	15 Oct 2016	Victoria Coren Mitchell, Lee Mack / Bob Mortimer	Pedro (for Joe)	I've Got Something to Tell You, Sexy Countdown, Tense Jenga music, Caveat Clauses, Chris Hoy Loves a Saveloy
91	22 Sep 2017	Jason Manford / Joe Wilkinson, Lee Mack / Fay Ripley	Regular members	Wannabe, Five Quiz Countdown, French Countdown, Fly Me To The Moon (Ping Pong), Medieval Countdown, YMCA
102	17 Aug 2018	Richard Ayoade, Jessica Knappett	Pedro (for Mark)	Imagine All the Extra Notes, Future Countdown, Money's Too Tight to Mention
120	9 Jan 2020	Harry Hill, Rose Matafeo	Regular members	Abbreviated Songs, Gong Jazz Countdown, You Can Leave Your Hat On, The Coot or the Moorhen, I Scratched My Arse

=== The Horne Section Television Programme (2018) ===
The Horne Section Television Programme was a two-hour special show recorded for UKTV in front of a live audience at the London Palladium on 18 April 2018. The show was subsequently broadcast on 24 May 2018 on the Dave channel. The show featured a number of guests performing with the band including Sara Pascoe, drag singer Le Gateau Chocolat, Nadine Coyle, Joe Wilkinson and Sue Perkins. The programme interspersed the live performance with supposed studio rehearsal footage in which Horne berates the band for their ability and refuses to allow certain songs to be part of the show.

Music featured
Your Love Keeps Lifting Me Hiya, Is It The Police?, Sara Pascoe: The Musical, Caveat/Mistake Music, Macarena, All By Myself/Nessun Dorma (with Le Gateau Chocolat), The Promise (with Nadine Coyle), Henry Hoover, Chinese Five Spice, Seasons, Acronym Song, This Is What It's All Been For (with Sue Perkins), You Can Leave Your Hat On, The Day I Forgot My Underpants, Less Is More

=== The Last Leg: Locked Down Under (2020) ===
The band appeared in a regular guest slot to close each show of this special series of The Last Leg, originally shown on Fridays at 10pm on Channel 4 during May–June 2020. Though the show was broadcast live from the homes of the hosts in Britain and Australia and via livestream with the individual guests, each member of the band pre-recorded their musical and visual contributions which were combined into a music video. The songs chosen were variously new podcast material, parody, and reworked previous podcast material.

Episode	First broadcast	Song featured
1	8 May 2020	Blessings
2	15 May 2020	7 Days
3	22 May 2020	Time Wasting
4	29 May 2020	I Miss People
5	5 June 2020	Summer Banger (2020)

=== Peter Crouch: Save Our Summer (2020) ===
The eight-part BBC series Peter Crouch: Save Our Summer was planned during the time of Coronavirus isolation to "bring the biggest names from the worlds of sport, comedy and music back into our lives" for summer 2020. It features Peter Crouch, Maya Jama, and Alex Horne and The Horne Section, with a range of sporting and entertainment guests, and was aired on BBC One during Saturday evenings during June–July 2020. The Horne Section contributed various programme jingles and parody songs, including a closing song of appreciation for some of the "unsung heroes" of the lockdown period.

=== Crouchy's Year-Late Euros: Live (2021) ===
Crouchy's Year-Late Euros: Live was a late-night entertainment chat show, aired on BBC1 during the UEFA Euro 2020 championships. It featured Peter Crouch, Maya Jama, and Alex Horne and The Horne Section. The band provided music, including various football-related parody songs.

=== The Horne Section TV Show (2022–25) ===
The Horne Section TV Show is a self-referential comedy about The Horne Section, combining elements of music mockumentary, chat show and sitcom. Mostly scripted (by Alex Horne), the show also includes elements of improvisation, including in the scenes when the band are shown in rehearsal. Songs from the band's repertory are presented both as integral plot devices and as featured music videos, and there is incidental music composed by members of the group (usually pianist Ed Sheldrake).

The plot shows Horne's attempts to create a successful TV vehicle for the band, leading out of the backstage world of his TV series Taskmaster, where he is frustrated with being regarded as a mere assistant. Alex Horne and the band members play exaggerated versions of themselves (along with Greg Davies, John Oliver, Rachel Horne, and Reggie Watts), while other actors (including Desiree Burch, Georgia Tennant, Camille Ucan, and Tim Mahendran) play fictional supporting roles. Celebrity guest(s) are invited to the 'chat show' portion as part of the scripted drama. The programme exploits the meta-referential quality of having a nested 'show' with the same name as itself, and makes playful use of devices such as narration, captions, reverse-filming, ironic discrepancies between the fictional 'show' and reality, ambiguities in diegetic music, a crowd-sourced dance sequence, and social media reviews of itself. The first series was released on 3 November 2022, and was broadcast on Channel 4 from 17 November 2022. On 9 January 2023 the show received a nomination at the Comedy.co.uk Awards 2022 in the Best New Sitcom category. The second series was released on 8 May 2025, and broadcast on Channel 4 from 22 May 2025.

Series 1 Episode	First broadcast	Main music	Guest(s)
1	17 Nov 2022	Taskmaster theme, Chinese Five Spice, Guess Who (Patatas Bravas)	Greg Davies
2	17 Nov 2022	Grandaddy, The Coot or the Moorhen	Martin Kemp, Anneka Rice
3	24 Nov 2022	I Am Funny, Alpha Bravo Charlie Delta, Is It the Police	Ranj Singh
4	24 Nov 2022	The Man who Lives on My Street, Chaka Demus and Pliers, Hear the Word (Ed), Donkeys are Pricks	Big Zuu
5	1 Dec 2022	One Lump or Two, Manure Industry, I Miss People	Imogen Heap
6	1 Dec 2022	Being With You, Hear the Word (Joe), What About the Children	Tim Key

Series 2 Episode	First broadcast	Main music	Guest(s)
1: The Strength	22 May 2025	Get Closer, The Dream, Happy Accident, World’s Strongest Musician (Tudors vs Vikings), Shitshow	Tim Lovejoy, Simon Rimmer, Gareth Malone
2: The Speech	22 May 2025	Time Wasting, Dull Song (instrumental), Worm	Ronni Ancona
3: The Cancellation	29 May 2025	Lucky Jemima, Super Bowl, Seasons	Kiell Smith-Bynoe, Anna Crilly, Bret McKenzie, Tim Minchin, David O’Doherty
4: The Haunting	29 May 2025	I’ve Got a Pen, Question Sessions, Enigma, If I Were (Angry Bee)	Stevie Martin, Yuriko Kotani, Tim Key
5: The Special Guest	5 June 2025	TV Show Theme, People People, Worm, Twelve Blues, Question Sessions, I Got What You Want	Rose Basista
6: The End?	5 June 2025	Oh What a Lovely Shirt, Farmland, Worm, If or When, Blessings, Closer (reprise)	Susan Hilton

== The Horne Section Podcast ==
The Horne Section Podcast is a musical comedy show featuring The Horne Section and hosted by Alex Horne. Episodes include comic songs from Horne and the band, both originals and parodies, as well as music-themed games and comedy. Early series feature a 'one-person special guest audience' at the recording, typically someone from the world of comedy, music or television.

=== Series 1 (2018) ===
The first series of eight weekly episodes was broadcast in early 2018 and produced in association with the web-based streaming service Deezer. The podcast was listed in the top 10 most streamed podcasts from the Deezer platform in 2018 and named in The Week’s best new podcasts of 2018 list. ('Bonus content' was available in a separate Deezer track for each episode, and any musical bonus content has been listed below after a semicolon.)

	Guest	First released	Music featured
1	David Arnold	23 Jan 2018	Radiator Wisdom, The Problem with Musical Comedy, David Arnold Song, The Adventures of Orf (The Library), Grief; Four Tomatoes, Jungle Boogie
2	Richard Osman	30 Jan 2018	If I Were, Richard's Rhyming Tweets, Your Days Are Numbered, Oh Richard!, Chinese Five Spice, Ignition (cover), Scottish Widows, What About the Credits; What About the Children
3	Adam Buxton	6 Feb 2018	Taskmaster (French version), Pepper Army, Things I Haven't Done Yet, Less is More
4	Susie Dent & Lou Sanders	13 Feb 2018	At Home with The A-Team, The Night the Cat Brought Me a Swan, Dent & Lou (Thesaurus Song), Our Manifesto, Pancake Day, Thick & Creamy; Top Trumps
5	Tim Key	20 Feb 2018	Su Pollard, Hope (I Found a Hat), My Favourite Hat Has Flowers On, Car Horn, So Many Names, Goodbye Tim Key, People People
6	Jessie Ware	27 Feb 2018	Autotune, CABBAGE, English Food, Alone, Alex Horne is Dead, Translation Station (Ave Maria), A Smile Will Push the Hurt Away; Burt Bacharach
7	Rick Edwards	6 Mar 2018	Dog Discrimination, Anusol, Rick Edwards Song, Record Player; Why Did You Become a Vegan, Flo the Baker
8	Roisin Conaty	13 Mar 2018	Bouncer from Neighbours, Roisin Roisin, Lorry Guy, Sticky Situation, Happy Accident, Alpha Bravo Charlie Delta, Thick & Creamy, Royal Wedding, How to Brush Your Teeth, The Hardness of Water; Tequila, Midnight

=== Series 2 (2018–19) ===
The podcast returned for a double second season in October 2018, running on a fortnightly basis until June 2019. No longer with Deezer, the show was funded by listener donations through Patreon, often in exchange for a specially-written 'dingle' about the contributor (interspersed among the other podcast items) or shorter 'holler' in a regular song. Along with regular guest episodes, special episodes were released for pre-Christmas, Boxing Day, and Pancake Day. During December 2018, the podcast was named in The Guardian’s Top 15 Podcasts of 2018. (Bonus content at the end of episodes has been included.)

	Guest / Show	First released	Music featured
1	Liza Tarbuck	17 Oct 2018	Lovely Shirt, I Wonder What Liza Tarbuck Has Been In?, The Adventures of Orf (Archery), Answerphone, The Horne Section
2	Andy Zaltzman	31 Oct 2018	Andy Zaltzman Is..., Labour Song, Daddy Did Something Different, Biscuits Sea Shanty, Helping Hand, Prelude: India 1882 and Great British (from Vice Versa the musical)
3	John Kearns	14 Nov 2018	I'll Have a Drink, John Kearns Can..., Ode to Joe/Not-Swearing Song, What Do Fish Do When It's Night Time?, Haddock & Chips (and a Gherkin), Yonder Hill, Advice for a Student
4	Jess Robinson	28 Nov 2018	Doodlebot, Thick & Creamy (Cover versions), Come Rest Ye Merrie Gentlemen, I Got You Babe, Jorge & Jesus (The Horse Song), Problems, Summer Breeze
4a	Bonus episode	5 Dec 2018	Christmas Medley
5	John Robins	12 Dec 2018	When the John John Robins, Drinking Makes Me Happy, Guess Who?, Hasta la Proxima, Camberley Town (live)
5a	Bonus episode	19 Dec 2018	Manger Danger
5b	Bonus episode	26 Dec 2018	Love Changes Everything, Coles' Law, The Adventures of Orf (Blockage), Who Dat Dog?
6	Nish Kumar	9 Jan 2019	Predictive Song, Coach Trip, Politics & Nish, I Punched a Seagull, The Adventures of Orf (Everest), Shut Up Jazz, Bagface (live)
7	Rob Deering	23 Jan 2019	I Scratched My Arse, Hello Hello Tomato, Rob Deering's Song, How Long, Super Wolf Bloodmoon
8	Nick Farrow	6 Feb 2019	Parent's Dilemma, Smartphones/Stupid People, Farrow Accounting, Numbers, Murder You Wrote, Jorge & Jesus (at the greengrocer's), The End of the Podcast, Peter Didn't Rise a Horse
9	Chris Hoy	27 Feb 2019	Hello Sir Chris, Chris Hoy Loves a Saveloy, Hoy Soy, Alex's Apology, I Smell Bullshit, Anything is Possible (from Vice Versa the musical)
9a	Bonus episode	5 Mar 2019	Pancake Day
10	Rufus Hound	13 Mar 2019	Mongers, Caveat Music, The Semi Final List, Cluedo, Ducklings, Silica Gel, Thick & Creamy (alternative version), Apology Song
11	Lizzy Yarnold	27 Mar 2019	The Greatest Slider, Kim Jong Un Takes the Train to China, Smartphone Users, Unwell on Race Day, Detectorists, Your Trousers are Boiling, Thick & Creamy (key changes), Livin' on a Prayer, L I Z Z Y YARNOLD MBE, The Upper Hand (from Vice Versa the musical)
12	Tim Vine	10 Apr 2019	You Can Do It Runners, Being With You, Tim Vine Song, Aunty Sarah's Gravy, Gout, Je Ne Sais Quoi, Barge Rock, Tim's Thank You Song, You Can Do It Runners (reprise), The Sound Womble
13	Matt Forde	24 Apr 2019	Forde or Smith, Jorge & Jesus (at the hairdresser's), Shampoo Promises, Rock Around the 24hr Clock, Sting is Shit at the Lute, There's a Man Who Lives on My Street
14	Emily Dean	8 May 2019	Where Have You Seen Emily Dean?, At The End Of The Day (It Is What It Is), If You Live in Half a House, I Can Sing a Mains Plug, Tomás the Funk Engine (Viktor Krakvonovsky)
14a	Special Episode	22 May 2019	Mainly spoken word edition entitled 'Real Life Disaster Problems and Solutions' detailing an incident in which trumpeter Joe damaged a pair of trousers. Features one song at the end: Ketchup & Mayonnaise
15	Rachel Horne	5 Jun 2019	Equador, Oh Rachel, Pork It Through, Adolf, Caveat Music 2, C'est la vie, Hiding in Dollywood
16	Kat Merchant	19 Jun 2019	Chaka Demus & Pliers, Kat Merchant Poem, Jerusalem (new intro), Thailand, Ready to Run (live)

=== Series 3 (2019) ===
The third series returned on 11 September 2019, reverting to a weekly eight-episode series. The episodes were preceded by a series 3 trailer on 21 August 2019 featuring the song Summer Banger. In January 2020, the podcast was named Best Music Podcast in the inaugural Podbible Awards, which described the show as: "an absolute joy...manages to blend music with comedy amazingly".

	Guest / Show	First released	Music featured
0	Series 3 trailer	21 Aug 2019	Summer Banger
1	Greg Davies	11 Sep 2019	Learn a Language 1 - Parrot, Feast (Greg & Alex Erotic Fiction), Learn a Language 2 - Monk, Nans, Jorge & Jesus (in space), Hey Jude (rediscovered lyrics), Wind the Bobbin Up, Learn a Language 3 - Cauliflower, Summer Banger
2	Katherine Ryan	18 Sep 2019	Dream Man (Alex), Brainy Quotes (Katherine's Song), Ob-La-Di-Hell, Abbreviated Songs, Saab Slogans, Henry Hoover Theme, The Coot or the Moorhen, The Song that Everyone Should Pick When They Are on Desert Island Discs Because it will Actually Help You Survive, Those were the Classified Scores
3	Ben Shephard	25 Sep 2019	Dr Elmo (James Bond theme), Ben Shephard - hard but not herd, Extinction (Gary song), The Dinner Time Song, Service Stations Rap
4	Angellica Bell	2 Oct 2019	Everybody, The One Show theme (extended version), The A-Team (French version), Never Gonna Believe This But All These People Were Born in the Same Month, Altogether Now, This IS the way to Amarillo, Party Time (from Vice Versa the musical)
5	Nick Helm	9 Oct 2019	You Must Remember This, Simply Nick Helm, Nothing Something then a Thing, Memories, Tequila Mockingbird, Mark's Musical (Out and About & Papered over the Crap)
6	Scroobius Pip	16 Oct 2019	It Takes Six, The Scroobius Pip (Edward Lear poem), Little Pig 1, Some People Play, Little Pig 2, Chinese Five Spice (spoken word version), All the James Bond Theme Tunes in 80 seconds, Little Pig 3, Just the Six of Us
7	Angela Scanlon	23 Oct 2019	Waterloo Women, Los Angelas, Loft Interview music, Top Trumps, The One Show theme (extended version 2), Flexitarian, Dream Man (Angela), The Knock-On Effect, Let's Hear It!
8	Al Murray	30 Oct 2019	Caveat Music 3, Don't Worry/Al Murray, Corridor Thank You Song, The Coot or the Moorhen (additional verses), Grandaddy (The Pea Song), That Figures

=== Series 4 (2020) ===
Series 4, another eight-episode weekly series, was announced in a short trailer released on 22 January 2020, and ran from Wednesday 29 January until 18 March 2020. The fourth series was immediately followed by Series 5.

	Guest / Show	First released	Music featured
0	Series 4 trailer	22 Jan 2020	Tudors vs Vikings (chorus only)
1	Ed Gamble	29 Jan 2020	Deep Down in your Soul (Gladiators), Veal for Every Meal, Heavy Metal Nursery Rhyme 1 - Bobby Shafto's Gone to Sea, Ed's New Ringtone, Heavy Metal Nursery Rhyme 2 - There Was a Lady All Skin and Bone, Heavy Metal Nursery Rhyme 3 - I Married my Wife on Sunday
2	Katy Wix	5 Feb 2020	Friends on the Water, Weetabix/Katy Wix, Flush the Bog, Anteeksi - the Finnish Song (Finnish version), Yoko Oh No, Excuse me - the Finnish Song (English version)
3	Pat Cahill	12 Feb 2020	The Brown Train, Announcement arpeggios, Patman, Two Puppies, I've Got a Pen, A Canoe is Just a Canoe, Infinite Antiques Roadshow, Jorge and Jesus (on music), Otamatone Final Countdown, Coconuts, Forgetful Granny, Flies Undone
4	Lauren Pattison	19 Feb 2020	Russian march introduction, The ballad of the girl who was banned from Byron's, When You Wish Upon a Star, Decisions, Phil songs, Sad preview music / Party of one, Thank-you music, Come Dance With Me
5	Dan Jones	26 Feb 2020	Dan Jones's Career So Far, Dan Jones vs Dow Jones, Mid-period Kate Bush music, Hocus Pocus by Focus, As Long as You Love Me, Football Music, Richard III, Tudors vs Vikings / Greensleeves
6	Spencer Jones	4 Mar 2020	Mr Jones, Trying to Leave Loop, A Spaceman Came Travelling / Monkey Music, This New Job of Mine, Do You Remember My Mum, Jorge and Jesus (at the café), Monkey Music reprise, Where Have All the Good Men Gone
7	Rob Auton	11 Mar 2020	Rob Rob Rob Auton, Good Boy, Dog or Duck or Dock, The Aeroplane Safety Announcement Song, One Creature Zoo (the Tortoise), Captain Big-Bum's Empty Slipper, We Have All the Time (in the World), Rubbery Water, Alex's Composition
8	Sara Pascoe	18 Mar 2020	Carefulonia, House Music, Sara Pascoe Has Been on TV, Your Song, Chillout Music, I Saw the King, I Don’t Care, I Have Nothing, Wear a Mac, Haddock and Chips (Tartar Sauce remix), Sing a Snooker Table, Brass Monkey Music

=== The Isolation Specials (Series 5) (2020) ===
The 'Isolation Specials' were announced in mid-March 2020 as a response to the Coronavirus concerns growing in the UK, and the consequent necessary postponement of the initial dates in the Horne Section's planned 2020 tour. Although a break in transmission had previously been announced, the first episode appeared only a week after the last of the scheduled episodes of series 4. Episodes were recorded with the band members connected by video link from their own homes, interspersed with clips from a prior telephone call to the guest and pre-recorded songs. Distinctive features of the series include songs put together by individual musicians, musical quizzes by the pianist, and a prominent use of incidental music to underscore conversations.

	Guest / show	First released	Music featured
1	Tim Key	25 Mar 2020	Hear the Word (Joe), Negative Music, Joan Armatrading, Savvy, Pam Ayres Eats Pom Bears, I Smell a Rat, I Smell a Rat (club mix)
2	Tim Key	9 Apr 2020	Peppa Pig, Manifesto (for the Isolation), I Themed a Theme, The Man from the North (consequences song), Boum (translation), One Lump or Two, Hear the Word (Alex), Newton's Laws, Last of the TV Theme Tunes
3	Max Rushden	22 Apr 2020	Road Safety (Rubber Knickers), The Warm Up on Talksport with You, Rockingham Cindy, There Ain't No Binman (Mark), Three Hundred Thousand and Thirty Four Nine Hundred and Seventy-Four Thousand, What a Wonderful World, Ambient Music, In Your Back Garden (Rushden), Hidden MPs, Shreds, Phobias, (Ca)Puccini Music
4	Robbie Williams	6 May 2020	Blessings (Lard Arse), Yes Today, The Tetris Diet, The Angry Chef Song, Thought of the Day (Facial Bones), Hear the Word (Ed), Hat Mancock, Angels (Williams), Thought of the Day (The Fly)
5	Rose Matafeo	20 May 2020	Spool Fools, Rose's Taskmaster song, Jokes jingle, Crossed Wires, If Drummers Were Musicians, Kids Say the Funniest Things, I Miss People, Hear the Word (Ben), Misty Spring Morning, Honk Oi Wah, Do Go Br My He, Thought of the Day (The Nearness), Oi Honk Squeak Honk

=== Series 6 (2020) ===
The next series of The Horne Section Podcast was announced by Alex Horne on Twitter on 30 September 2020. The numbering of the series was initially left ambiguous in the band's Patreon post of 1 Oct 2020, where it is referred to as "SERIES 5 (? OR 6?)", but has now been confirmed there to be Series 6 (retroactively making the Isolation Specials officially Series 5 of the podcast). A darker quality was discernible: new regular features included a cover version of any song chosen by the guest for their funeral, the setting of a surreal lyric composed by the guest saying words in alternation with Alex, and a segment that purported to rifle through the contents of celebrities' rubbish bins.

	Guest / show	First released	Music featured
1	Reggie Watts	4 Nov 2020	Worm, What is in Your Rubbish Bin (David Gower), Reggie's Looping Thing, Poirot, Good Life, You've Got the Lovejoy, Tailwhip
2	Mae Martin	11 Nov 2020	When I Needed a Neighbour, Potaconuts, Bidding on a Cup on eBay, What is in Your Rubbish Bin (Bruno Tonioli), Bleak Midwinter in the Sky, Three Old Dogs
3	Mark Watson	18 Nov 2020	Time v Persons, On the Bouncy Castle (Watson), Warning: Gross Material, I'm Always Seeing You Do Cool Stuff (Watson), Chat Back, What is in Your Rubbish Bin (Miley Cyrus), There's a Light, They Went in a Car, Town Called Malice
4	Hank Green	25 Nov 2020	Butcher Song, Taskmistress, Lingo Bingo, A Song About an Anglerfish (Green), The Best Thing Ever (Palmer), Chill Noir Jazz, I Am Funny, Born This Way, Uplifting Music, If You Want a Smaller Device
5	Tom Basden	2 Dec 2020	Dance Saxophone, Donkeys are Pricks, Lingo Bingo, A Whiter Barry of Pâté, The Ballad of Middle America, Dream a Little Rant, Champagne (Basden), I've Just Seen Mr Blobby (Basden), Ringpiece Phones, There's a Ghost in My House (Basden), Ecce Quid, Tom Basden He is Dead, Bleak Vamp, A Whiter Barry of Pâté (reprise)
6	Daisy May Cooper	9 Dec 2020	Drive On, Alex in Wonderland, Faece-Ease, The Raccoons Theme, MMMBop, What is in Your Rubbish Bin (Claudia Schiffer), Staple it to Your Favourite Duck, They're Coming to Take Me Away, The Legacy, The 2003 UFO, Flowers
7	Isy Suttie	16 Dec 2020	Low-Battery Mode, Garglebox, Waffle the Wonder Dog, Three Little Words, Finding Out About the Pianist, Sugar Spun Sister, I Ain't Got No Scruples
8	Rupert Gregson-Williams	23 Dec 2020	Joe's Trumpet, Coles' Law, Puns vs Synonyms, Hat Chat Riff, Jorge and Jesus (at Christmas), Bleak remix, ABBA Trumpet, A Hat Indoors, Treacherous Cretins, Tim Key versus the Band

=== Series 7 (2021) ===
Recording of series 7 of The Horne Section Podcast was underway by 9 February 2021, as shown by a picture on the band's Instagram site. Some guests were recommended or invited over Twitter, including comedian/musician Rachel Parris. The series was recorded with the performers 'in isolation' (as with series 5–6), due to ongoing fluctuations in UK lockdown guidance.

The series began on 14 March 2021 with a one-off 'mash-up' combining the podcast with Romesh Ranganathan's music podcast Hip Hop Saved My Life for Comic Relief. A special visual episode livestreamed through Dice followed on 2 April. The series ended without prior announcement at the sixth episode, a curtailed audio version of the Livestream special. Distinctive aspects of this series included songs by 'The Brothers Smooth', developments in the story of Alex's sighting of a UFO, and a continuing trend towards longer and more fully-developed 'dingles' for subscribers.

	Guest / show	First released	Music featured
Bonus episode	Romesh Ranganathan	14 Mar 2021	'Hip Hop Saved the Horne Section Podcast' special: Hip Hop Saved The Horne Section Podcast Theme Mashup, No Chairs, Forget About Adultery I'm Gonna Commit Upholstery, Mama Said Knock You Out, Garden Furniture remix
1	Jessica Knappett	24 Mar 2021	Yoga, Here I Am I’m a Violin (Knappett), Mysterious Piano Music, The Ballad of Mysterious Sightings, Tense Oboe Music, Animals Who Are Cleverer Than They Look, The Mighty Andrew Marr, What Willip Sends
2	Nina Conti	31 Mar 2021	Do You Remember Um Bongo, Arse Hand I, Mysterious Guitar Music, Drum rhythms advert, Let’s Piss Off to the Caesar’s Palace, Arse Hand II
Livestream special	Mike Wozniak	2 Apr 2021	No Flies, Jorge & Jesus (at the seaside), What is Sweep Saying, Roxanne (Sweep), Thick and Creamy (oompah band), Groupies, A UFO, Ja Ja Ding Dong, What’s in Your Trousers, Ten Million Henries
3	Rachel Parris	7 Apr 2021	Tony Blair, Love Triangle, Mushroom Stroganoff (Parris), Movie Quotes as Songs, Sea Shanty (Parris), What is a Melodica (Parris), Midnight Farts
4	James Acaster	14 Apr 2021	Midnight Feast, In Other Words, Over My Shoulder (Acaster), Cover Stories, Mumford and Sons, Dunker Ma Hunker
5	Ellie Taylor	21 Apr 2021	I Am a Prick, I Don’t Know Much, The Sensible Guy, At Least I Keep His Eyes in My Life, Massive Knee
6	Mike Wozniak	28 Apr 2021	musical content as Livestream of 2 Apr (except What's in Your Trousers)

=== Series 8 (2024) ===
After a long break, the Podcast returned on 14 February 2024. The band's Patreon page announced that they will no longer be recording or including listener-sponsored Dingles (a distinctive feature from Series 2 to Series 7) as these had become too time-consuming.

The Podcast returns to the studio, in a 'snappy' format of 30–40 minutes, with no guests and a strong focus on the band. Along with a variety of original songs, there are a number of quizzes with themes, and the recurrent 'movie quotes as songs' feature first heard in series 7 (Rachel Parris episode). The series serves as a prelude to a major national tour of over 30 concert dates during 2024.

	Title	Released	Music
1	Virgo Mary	14 Feb 2024	Reaction Stations, Minor Tour music, Farmland, Going for Gold, Movie Quotes as Songs (Shark), Thank You song, Off on Tour, Hot Yoghurt
2	Great Play	21 Feb 2024	Likes and Dislikes, A Word in Your Year, Stop Recommending Shows, First of the Last of the Summer Wine, Likes and Dislikes (reprise)
3	Lil Pat	28 Feb 2024	What's on the Show Today music, Which Bits of Our Personalities, How Many Eggs, The Sausagiest Sausage the World Has Ever Seen, Movie Quotes as Songs (Keep Moving Forward), Grandaddy (Beyoncé), Off on Tour (Calypso)
4	Put Your Trousers in the Wash	6 Mar 2024	Command-Shift-T, Boy o Boy o Boy Band, KUMK, Thank You song, Deep Melancholic Music, Tell Us a Joke, Put Your Trousers in the Wash When They're Dirty, Black Beauty, Movie Quotes as Songs (You're Funny), Less is More (cover)
5	The Piggy Episode	13 Mar 2024	I've Got Pig Problems, Gentle Blend (Fusing Music), Pigarette, Depends, Off on Tour, Putting Inappropriate Things to Music (spleen), Movie Quotes as Songs (pig-related), I'm In, Uncle Ray
6	Steve...	20 Mar 2024	The Lion's Main, Flying Without Kids, Don't Stop The Music For Goodness' Sake, The Stick (Knock Yourself Out), Booze and Shoes, Tell Us A Joke, These Days Are Days

=== Series 9 (2025) ===
The new series of the Horne Section Podcast was announced on 1st March 2025, towards the end of a series of daily music puzzles known as the 'Horndle' on social media. Recurrent features include Sticky Streets (a serialised radio play by Alex Horne with voice acting and sound effects improvised by the musicians), and band members' individual 'homework' to present a song about liking a parents' friend. The series has eight episodes (with no dingles or hollers to Patreon subscribers).

	Title	Released	Music
1	Boing Boing Boing	5 Mar 2025	Extended intro theme, Jorge and Jesus live, The Doors, The Boing Boing Song (Liners), Who’s the best at music today, Sticky Streets
2	Luton Airport	12 Mar 2025	Duty Free music, Superman jingle, Betty, Really Licking My Parents’ Friend, Budget Lasagne, Maim that Tune, Welcome Theme Tune (in 5/4), Toilet song (Press the Flush)
3	State Secrets	19 Mar 2025	Recipe for Disaster, Travelling music, Will Carling’s Wikipedia, Cheesy Just When I’m Horning, Pure Sex Music / Jeremy, French music reprise
4	The Boss Calls	26 Mar 2025	Slow-building triumphant music, The Antidote (Bitten by a Snake), Manor House jingle, Background music, Trailer for potato episode / Reflective music, Come on in John, Bat-Eared Fox
5	The Dulux Trade Pro Colour Guide	2 Apr 2025	Camping Music, A Capella Auckland, Dustpan and Brush Slippers, Correspondence Music, The Dulux Trade Pro Colour Guide, Literally Metaphorically, Stuck on the Streets (Richard Madeley)
6	The TK Episode	9 Apr 2025	Farms (But Not Ones With Balconies), Cover for a Lover to Discover, Chinese Five Spice (TK cover), The Big Apple, The Weather, Countdown to the Hard Drive, Paradise (The Isle of Wight), I’m Richard Madeley, Decisions (TK cover)
7	Funky	16 Apr 2025	Compost Heap, Spanners (But Not Ones With Stabilisers), Great Expectations, Man or House, Moody music, Alan the Best, The Three of Us (Are All in Love)
8	Go On Pete	23 Apr 2025	Thick and Creamy (human & AI), Every Dog Blames Their Tools, Thinking about Chords, Rabbit Stew, My Dad’s Undisputed Bestest Friend Who is Stupid, Forbidden Affection (Terri), Biscuits (But Not Ones With Big Old Potatoes in Them), Sad and Haunting Piano Music

=== Series 10 (2026) ===
For the first time, the Horne Section Podcast is being performed as a series of live concerts with a public audience before being edited for release later as a Podcast. The concerts take place in the Leicester Square Theatre in London, approximately monthly during 2026, and each half of the show has a surprise celebrity guest. Release dates for the Podcast have not yet been announced, and it is unclear whether the autumn/winter dates constitute an extended Series 10 or a new Series 11.

	Guest	Date of gig	Episode release	Music
1	Sam Campbell	04 Mar 2026	TBA	Henry Bring Them to Me, Campbell v. Gamble, The Hardness of Water, Who's Your Daddy (Big Ol' Dog Poo), What Time Is It, Jazz Jokes, Where I Parked My Car
2	Ivo Graham	04 Mar 2026		Ode to Joy, How Many Things Have You Got Ivo, What Are the Kids On About theme, Japanese Music, Things That We Don't Mind, Secretive Music, Talking Heads vamp, Perfection (Sexy Teabags), No No Pyjamas, The Champion Takes It All
3	Lucia Keskin	07 Apr 2026		Sad Little Piano, Sponsorship Dingle, Spaghetti Junction, Transport Surnames, Rock Jokes, I've Got a Secret
4	Reece Shearsmith	07 Apr 2026		
5	Jordan Brookes	11 May 2026		
6	Joe Marler	11 May 2026		
7	Phil Ellis	15 June 2026		
8	Harry Hill	15 June 2026		

	Guest	Date of gig	Episode release	Music
9	Maisie Adam	01 Sep 2026		
10	Patti Harrison	01 Sep 2026		
11	Kurupt FM	11 Oct 2026		
12		cancelled		
13	Stevie Martin	09 Nov 2026		
14	Fern Brady	09 Nov 2026		
15		11 Jan 2027		
16		11 Jan 2027		
