= Archie Manners =

British comedian and magician

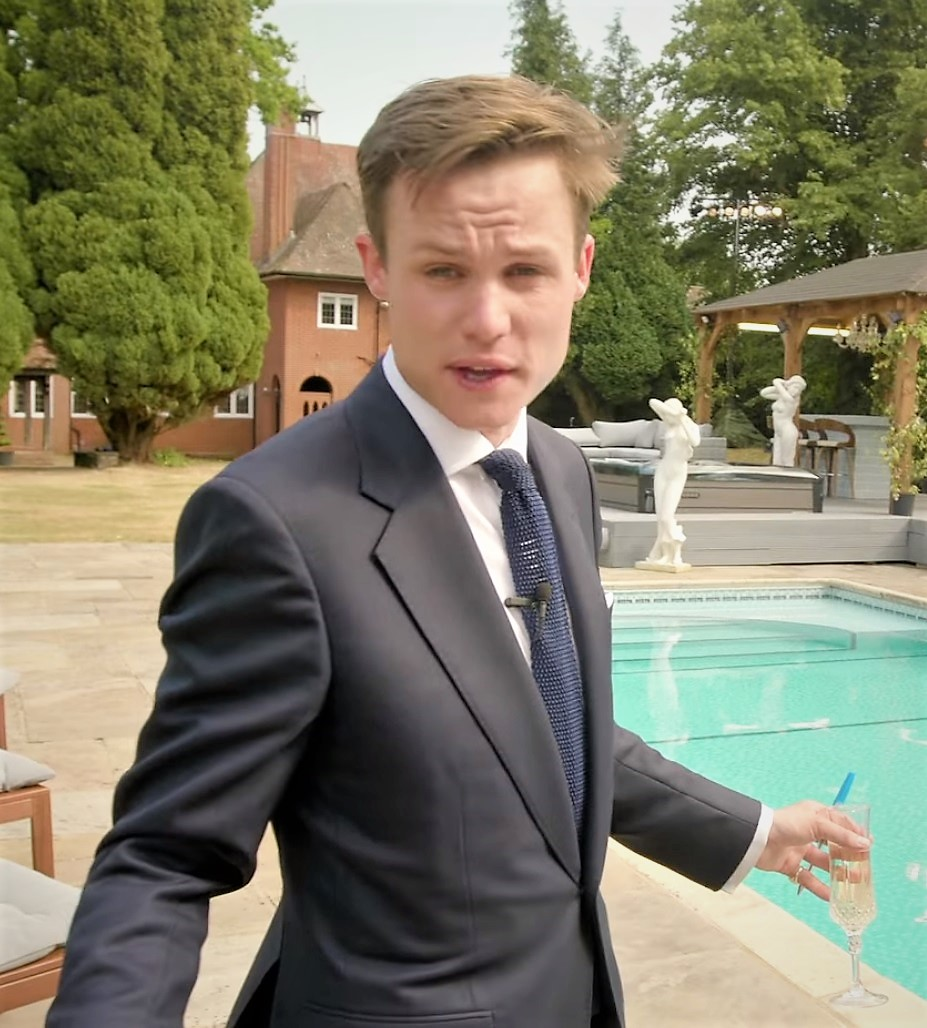
- Manners introduces The Royal World in 2018
- Born: Archie Thomas Manners; 19 May 1993 (age 33)
- Education: University of Bristol
- Occupations: Comedian, magician, television host
- Relatives: Manners family

YouTube information
- Years active: 2015–2025
- Last updated: 19 June 2020

Archie Thomas Manners (born 19 May 1993) is a British comedian, magician, and television host. He hosted The Royal World, a reality television series on MTV International which aired in 2018. He was a co-host on the Josh Pieters and Archie Manners YouTube channel, with Josh Pieters which gained more than 1 million subscribers.

== Early life ==
A great-grandson of Francis Henry Manners, 4th Baron Manners, he is fifteenth in the line of succession to the Manners Barony and, as a descendant of John Manners, 3rd Duke of Rutland, twenty-third in the line of succession to the Dukedom of Rutland. He grew up in Hampshire. He earned a degree in political studies from University of Bristol.

== Broadcasting and journalism career ==
Manners hosts the reality television series The Royal World on MTV International and starred in Comedy Central's Trickheads. He also hosts British television show Look into My Eyes on E4. Manners has an online series for The Hook called Archie Asks. He also writes a satirical column for the Gentleman's Journal.

== YouTube ==
In September 2019, Manners and YouTuber Josh Pieters created a fake restaurant through Deliveroo. It was called The Italian Stallion, and it was said to deliver microwavable meals as an experiment. They returned all of the profit from the venture. In November 2019, they followed this up with a prank at the KSI vs. Logan Paul II boxing match, where they managed to convince several attendees that an Ed Sheeran lookalike was the actual Ed Sheeran.

In January 2020, English far-right political commentator Katie Hopkins was pranked by Manners and Pieters into accepting a fake award, titled the "Campaign to Unify the Nation Trophy". Pieters flew Hopkins to Prague where she accepted the award and gave a speech, while the initials of the fictitious award were prominently displayed in the background, forming the swear word "cunt". The pair uploaded the prank to their YouTube channel on the same day that Hopkins was suspended from Twitter for breaking their anti-hate rules.

In May 2020, Manners and Pieters pranked Big Cat Rescue CEO, Carole Baskin, into believing she was giving an interview on The Tonight Show Starring Jimmy Fallon.

In July 2023, Manners and Pieters disrupted an event held by environmental activist group Just Stop Oil. In December of that year, Manners and Pieters pranked Conservative MP Suella Braverman into accepting Channel 4 comedy show The Last Leg's "Dick Of The Year Award", after viewers of the show voted for her to be that year's recipient.

== Political activism ==
As a Conservative Party activist, he wrote for the right-wing blog Conservative Home and attended the party's conferences in 2010 and 2011. He worked as an intern for Conservative politician Anne-Marie Trevelyan during the 2010 general election.

In February 2025, The Spectator reported that Manners had previously worked for the political party Reform UK in digital communications and was currently working as a consultant. In June of that year, Manners was hired by The Centre for a Better Britain (formerly Resolute 1850), a Reform UK-aligned think tank to "provide social media and communications advice".
