= Peter Crouch: Save Our Summer =

British TV comedy panel game show

- Genre: Comedy panel game
- Presented by: Peter Crouch; Alex Horne; Maya Jama
- Theme music composer: The Horne Section
- Country of origin: United Kingdom
- Original language: English
- No. of series: 1
- No. of episodes: 8

Production
- Executive producers: Gabe Turner; Andy Price
- Running time: 1x 30mins; 7x 45mins
- Production company: Fulwell 73 Ltd

Original release
- Network: BBC One
- Release: 6 June – 25 July 2020

Peter Crouch: Save Our Summer is a British sports comedy panel game show that first aired on BBC One on 6 June 2020. Originally planned as part of the BBC's Euro 2020 coverage, the eight-part television series was announced by the BBC on 24 March 2020 as a response to the widespread cancellation of public activities in sports, music, and comedy amid the spread of COVID-19. The programme features Peter Crouch, Maya Jama, and Alex Horne and The Horne Section, and aims to give the British public "a little bit of all the big summer events that have been taken away".

Regular features on the programme include a game of 'VAR' (conducting musical tempo in 'very accurate rhythm' using kick-ups), a guest musician performing a solo 'garden session', and a closing song to "some of the unsung heroes of the last few months".

The show returned in 2021 as Crouchy's Year-Late Euros: Live, acting as it was originally planned, a late-night after show for UEFA Euro 2020.

== Transmissions ==
| Series | Episodes | Originally released | |
| Series | Episodes | First released | Last released |
|---|---|---|---|
| 1 | 8 | 6 June 2020 | 25 July 2020 |

== Episodes ==
| No. overall | No. in series | Guests | Original release date |
|---|---|---|---|
| 1 | 1 | Rio Ferdinand, Chris Ramsey, Mo Farah, Ellie Simmonds, Jermaine Jenas and Serge Pizzorno | 6 June 2020 |
| 2 | 2 | Liam Gallagher, Rob Beckett, James Bay, Shaun Wright-Phillips, Jamie Redknapp and Kevin Pietersen | 13 June 2020 |
| 3 | 3 | Jack Whitehall, Abbey Clancy, Anne-Marie and Jermaine Jenas | 20 June 2020 |
| 4 | 4 | Melanie C, Jimmy Carr, Wayne Bridge, Jessica Ennis-Hill, Max Whitlock and The Black-Eyed Peas | 27 June 2020 |
| 5 | 5 | Aisling Bea, Stephen Graham, Joe Cole and John Legend | 4 July 2020 |
| 6 | 6 | Tinie Tempah, Mo Farah, Jessica Ennis-Hill, Jamie Redknapp and Ellie Goulding | 11 July 2020 |
| 7 | 7 | Mo Gilligan, Anne-Marie, Jamie Redknapp, Dina Asher-Smith and Zara Larsson | 18 July 2020 |
| 8 | 8 | Mo Farah, AJ Tracey and Mabel, Jamie Redknapp and Roisin Conaty | 25 July 2020 |
