= Richard Bacon's Beer & Pizza Club =

- Title card, 2010.
- Presented by: Richard Bacon
- Country of origin: United Kingdom
- Original language: English
- No. of series: 2
- No. of episodes: 20 (list of episodes)

Production
- Running time: 45 minutes (including adverts)
- Production company: Talkback Thames

Original release
- Network: ITV4
- Release: 22 September 2010 – 6 December 2011

Richard Bacon's Beer & Pizza Club is a British comedy panel show produced by Talkback Thames for ITV4. The programme is presented by Richard Bacon. The programme has aired two series.

== Overview ==
Each week, Bacon is joined by three celebrity guests who discuss various issues whilst free to drink beer and eat pizza. Each guest also asks a big question to the others and the person who gives the best answer is declared the winner of that round.

== Episode list ==
=== Series 1 (2010) ===
No. overall	No. in series	Guests	Original release date
1	1	Charlie Baker, Rufus Hound, Tim Lovejoy	22 September 2010
2	2	Charlie Baker, Stephen Mangan, Jon Richardson	29 September 2010
3	3	Stephen K. Amos, Alex James, Andrew Maxwell	6 October 2010
4	4	Charlie Baker, Micky Flanagan, Danny Wallace	13 October 2010
5	5	Charlie Baker, Rufus Hound, Seann Walsh	20 October 2010
6	6	Charlie Baker, Gino D'Acampo, Phil Nichol	27 October 2010
7	7	Charlie Baker, Dave Berry, Jack Osbourne	3 November 2010
8	8	Alain de Botton, Rufus Hound, Lee Ryan	10 November 2010
9	9	Charlie Baker, Dave Berry, Reece Shearsmith	17 November 2010
10	10	Charlie Baker, Russell Kane, Joe Swash	24 November 2010

=== Series 2 (2011) ===
No. overall	No. in series	Guests	Original release date
11	1	Giles Coren, Reginald D. Hunter, Russell Kane	4 October 2011
12	2	Alun Cochrane, Roisin Conaty, Rufus Hound, Seann Walsh	11 October 2011
13	3	Justin Lee Collins, Keith Lemon, Imogen Thomas, Danny Wallace	18 October 2011
14	4	Tim Key, Al Murray, Chris Ramsey	25 October 2011
15	5	Tom Deacon, Amir Khan, Joe Swash, Holly Walsh	1 November 2011
16	6	Jodie Marsh, Al Murray, Daniel Sloss, Seann Walsh	8 November 2011
17	7	Andrew Maxwell, Tom Stade, Mark Wright	15 November 2011
18	8	Dave Berry, Caroline Flack, Mark Watson, Jorgie Porter	22 November 2011
19	9	Rob Beckett, Jenny Eclair, Gemma Merna, Mark Watson	29 November 2011
20	10	Joe Calzaghe, Russell Kane, Gordon Smart	6 December 2011
