= Josh Pieters =

South African YouTuber (born 1993)

- Born: 17 September 1993 (age 33); Knysna, South Africa
- Occupation: YouTuber

YouTube information
- Channel: Josh Pieters
- Years active: 2015–present
- Genres: Pranks; Comedy; Documentaries
- Subscribers: 1.51 million
- Views: 171.60 million
- Last updated: 19 July 2025

Joshua Pieters (born 17 September 1993) is a South African YouTuber known for pranks on celebrities. Originally from Knysna, he is currently based in London.

== Career ==
In August 2019, Pieters pranked 40 social media influencers including Louise Thompson into believing they received a piece of moon rock from the National Space Centre (NSC). Pieters later apologized to the NSC. In September 2019, Pieters and his YouTube partner Archie Manners created a fake restaurant, The Italian Stallion, to sell microwave meals as authentic Italian cuisine via Deliveroo. They followed this up in November 2019 with a prank at the KSI vs. Logan Paul II boxing match, where they managed to convince several YouTubers, influencers, and venue staff at the Staples Center that an Ed Sheeran lookalike was the actual Ed Sheeran.

On 27 January 2020, English far-right political commentator Katie Hopkins was pranked by Pieters into accepting a fake award, titled the "Campaign to Unify the Nation Trophy". Pieters flew Hopkins to Prague where she accepted the award and gave a speech, while the initials of the fictitious award were prominently displayed in the background, forming the swear word "cunt". Pieters uploaded the prank to his YouTube channel on the same day that Hopkins was suspended from Twitter for breaking their anti-hate rules.

As of February 2020, he had over 1 million subscribers on YouTube. In May 2020, Pieters and Manners pranked Big Cat Rescue CEO, Carole Baskin, into believing she was giving an interview on The Tonight Show Starring Jimmy Fallon. This was followed by a prank in October 2020 in which they posed as peace researchers and successfully nominated Gemma Collins for the Nobel Peace Prize.

On 31 July 2021, English anti-vaxxer Piers Corbyn was pranked by Pieters into accepting bribe money to stop spreading misinformation about Astra-Zeneca where he gave Corbyn "$10,000" in Monopoly cash.

In July 2023, Pieters and Manners disrupted an event held by environmental activist group Just Stop Oil. In December, Pieters and Manners pranked Conservative MP Suella Braverman into accepting Channel 4 comedy show The Last Leg's "Dick Of The Year Award", after viewers of the show voted for her to be that year's recipient.
