= The Last Leg =

British TV topical comedy talk show

- Genre: Late-night chat show; News/political satire/sport (during Paralympics)
- Presented by: Adam Hills; Josh Widdicombe; Alex Brooker
- Opening theme: "Harder Than You Think" by Public Enemy
- Country of origin: United Kingdom
- Original language: English
- No. of series: 32
- No. of episodes: 377 (list of episodes)

Production
- Executive producers: Andrew Beint and Danny Carr
- Production locations: Riverside Studios (2012–2014, 2022); The London Studios (2014–2018); TC1, Television Centre (2018–2021, 2023–present); TC3, Television Centre (2026–present); Elstree Studios (2020–2021, 2024–present); BBC Elstree Centre (2023)
- Running time: 40 minutes (series 1); 30–50 minutes (series 2–5); 60–120 minutes (from series 6)
- Production company: Open Mike Productions

Original release
- Network: Channel 4
- Release: 30 August 2012 – present

The Last Leg (known during its first series as The Last Leg with Adam Hills and in Australia as Adam Hills: The Last Leg) is a British comedy chat show broadcast by Channel 4.

Presented by Australian comedian Adam Hills, the series primarily features commentaries and comedy sketches satirising news, politics, and other current events from the past week, as well as interviews with celebrities and other public figures; some of the programme's humour is derived from discussions relating to disability and parasports, as Hills was born without a right foot and uses a prosthesis. Hills is joined by comedian and journalist Josh Widdicombe and journalist Alex Brooker as regular co-hosts.

The Last Leg originally premiered in 2012 as a nightly aftershow for Channel 4's coverage of the 2012 Summer Paralympics, where it primarily served as a recap of the day's events. After premiering to strong viewership and reviews, Channel 4 renewed The Last Leg as a regular weekly series outside of the Games, returning with its inaugural New Year special The Last Leg of The Year on 30 December, followed by new episodes beginning in January 2013. The series has continued to air special runs of nightly episodes during subsequent Summer Paralympics, usually broadcasting on-location from the host city.

Outside of the UK, the show has been broadcast in Hills' native Australia by the ABC, and since late 2025 by SBS, albeit delayed until the next week, and featuring a different theme tune.

== Format ==
=== Overview ===
The Last Leg is described by main presenter Adam Hills as "Three guys with four legs talking about the week", because Hills was born without a right foot and Brooker had his right leg amputated when he was a baby.

The original series, broadcast during the 2012 Paralympics, was a look back at each day's events during the competition, as well as a look at the news that week. Following on from the Paralympics, the series became weekly, and looks at political and other events in the news that week, as well as covering Paralympic matters. The show features guest interviews with Paralympians and celebrities.

Originally it was intended to be broadcast on More4 at midnight and was intended to feature Hills alone, hence the original title. However, after a run-through, Channel 4 saw more potential and put the show on at 10 pm every day. During the pilot, which saw Hills alone as presenter and Widdicombe and Brooker merely as guests, producers decided to keep Brooker and Widdicombe as recurring co-presenters.

The series is broadcast live and encourages interaction with the viewers at home, holding polls via Twitter using hashtags. A recurring theme in the show is the use of the hashtag #isitok to highlight questions from Twitter users to be asked in the show. Initially it was for asking questions about disability that people felt awkward asking: the broadening of the show's remit is reflected in the questions asked in this stream.

The show originally was broadcast from the Riverside Studios in London. It would later move to the ITV London Studios on London's South Bank. From series 14, it is now made in Studio TC1 at the BBC Studios in Television Centre, West London, which is operated and run by BBC Studioworks, though some 2020 episodes were made at Elstree Studios.

In late-April 2020, it was announced that The Last Leg would be "Locked Down Under" during the coronavirus lockdown. Hills, Widdicombe and Brooker would be hosting the show from their homes in Melbourne, London and Huddersfield taking social distancing to the extreme and looking at the week's news in a comedic manner. Guests including Miriam Margolyes and Stephen Merchant were featured using video relay, and each episode ended with a song from The Horne Section. The show ran for five episodes from 8 May until 5 June and is available on All 4 after broadcast.

The show is currently playing at Television Centre, London. The latest series aired in early 2026.

=== Recurring segments ===
Recurring segments in the show include rants or attacks by Hills on certain people and organisations, which has since resulted in the coining of Hills' catchphrase: "Don't be a dick!" Another segment is "The Last 7 Days", in which Widdicombe looks at more comic news items that have occurred during the week, and Brooker's various attempts to qualify for the 2016 Summer Paralympics. Another is the "Bullshit Button", which was first used in a segment in which Brooker interviewed the then-Leader of the Liberal Democrats Nick Clegg to see if Clegg could persuade him to vote in the 2015 UK general election. Brooker would press a large red buzzer that played an audio recording of him saying the word "Bullshit" if he thought Clegg was lying during the interviews. Since then, the buzzer has been used in various situations whenever the show thinks someone is lying, and additional buzzers during various seasons have been added including phrases like "Cow chutney", "A shite in shining armour", "A turd the size of Disneyland Paris", and "Thomas the Wank Engine" by Armando Ianucci and "Fuck off" by Brian Cox.

=== Dick of the Year ===
Year	Dick of the Year	Second place	Third place	Steaming Turd
2013	Vladimir Putin			
2014	Katie Hopkins	Nigel Farage		
2015	Jeremy Hunt	Donald Trump		
2016	2016	Donald Trump		
2017	Donald Trump	Theresa May	Lewis Hamilton	Harvey Weinstein
2018	Jacob Rees-Mogg	Piers Morgan	Boris Johnson	Donald Trump
2019	Boris Johnson	Jacob Rees-Mogg	Prince Andrew	
2020	Dominic Cummings	Donald Trump	Matt Hancock	COVID-19
2021	Boris Johnson	Priti Patel	Anti-vaxxers	QAnon
2022	Matt Hancock	Elon Musk	Liz Truss	Vladimir Putin
2023	Suella Braverman	Richard Masters	Elon Musk	
2024	Elon Musk			
2025	Donald Trump	Nigel Farage		

Since January 2014, The Last Leg has presented a mock prize to the "Dick of the Year", awarded for being the biggest dick over the previous year. Nominees are suggested by viewers on Twitter, as well as the hosts. The winner is voted on by the viewers using Twitter with the hashtag #dickoftheyear.

In January 2015, journalist Katie Hopkins received the most votes for 2014's "Dick of the Year" but Hills and the team making the show decided not to give Hopkins the prize on the grounds that she would enjoy receiving it. Thus, the prize went to the person with the second-highest number of votes, UK Independence Party leader Nigel Farage.

In the 2016 Christmas special, the prize was awarded to whole of the year 2016, defeating Donald Trump, Nigel Farage and David Cameron.

In 2017, it was announced that the people who have come second and third in the "Dick of the Year" voting will be named "Ballbags of the Year". The "Steaming Turd" award was also created for Harvey Weinstein, who was ruled out of running for the main award on the grounds that it was possible that Weinstein may take "Dick of the Year" as a compliment.

In 2019, comedy writer Graham Linehan was the runaway favourite nominee by viewers to be given the award, in light of controversial comments he had made on social media about transgender people. After Linehan expressed interest in winning the award, Hills and the team disqualified him from receiving the award under the precedent set by Hopkins in 2014. Another poll by the show also announced David Cameron as "Dick of the Decade".

In 2023, it was decided that multiple time nominee Vladimir Putin would be made a lifetime recipient.

In collaboration with YouTubers Josh Pieters and Archie Manners, The Last Leg presented Suella Braverman with her Dick of the Year 2023 award in person by inviting Braverman to a fake boat launch in her constituency.

The awards have been rested in the main show from 2024 onwards. However, the official Reddit community decided to carry on the awards ceremony with Elon Musk honored as the first Reddit Dick of the Year.

=== Theme music ===
The theme music is Public Enemy's "Harder Than You Think", which became the show's permanent theme after initially serving as the title music to the whole of Channel 4's 2012 Summer Paralympics coverage.

== Episodes ==
Original logo (with original title) used during the first series

The first and ninth series were broadcast daily at the end of the day's Paralympics coverage on Channel 4. The second series was broadcast each Friday, with the show moving to Wednesday nights for its third series, before reverting to Friday nights for the fourth and fifth series.

In October 2012 it was announced that the show would return for a holiday special titled The Last Leg of the Year on 30 December, and a second series, which began broadcasting in January 2013. A third and fourth series followed in July 2013 and January 2014 (timed around the 2014 Winter Paralympics) respectively. A fifth series started broadcasting in August 2014, followed by a sixth series in January 2015 and a seventh in June 2015.

After the seventh series, a special 2-part series entitled The Last Leg Goes Down Under was broadcast on 29 January and 5 February 2016, and preceded the start of series 8 on 12 February. Starting from series 8, the show was given a brand new set.

On 25 March 2016, in a parody of the Boaty McBoatface internet poll controversy, the show released the #renametheLastLeg hashtag on Twitter live on the set to allow viewers to choose a new name for the show. The show brought the number of choices down to the four most popular ones and then they released a Twitter poll to change the name of the programme for next week's final episode of the series. The poll received a total of 3,731 votes with the highest scoring programme name being "Your Mum" with a 30% vote. The last episode of the series aired on 1 April 2016 and was called Your Mum. During one 2016 Summer Paralympics episode on 14 September 2016, host Adam Hills announced that the show was to be renamed again, this time in Paralympic athlete Libby Clegg's honour. The remainder of that show was called The Fast Clegg.

The show aired a two-hour special entitled Re-United Kingdom dedicated to MP Jo Cox on 16 June 2017 (the anniversary of her death). Featuring dozens of comedians and politicians, the show aimed to inspire the public to resolve animosity between people they had fallen out with. Politicians appeared in pre-recorded skits where they were stuck in a lift with another politician they disliked, and found common ground; some members of the public who had resolved arguments with each other were shown in a hot tub together.

Following the passing of Queen Elizabeth II on Thursday 8 September 2022, it was announced that there would be no new episode that Friday. This was not due to any regulations, but was rather a choice made by those involved with the show, with Adam Hills breaking the news on Twitter: "It just doesn’t feel right". The show the next week was a tribute to Her Majesty, without the typical broad coverage of the week's news.

== Reception ==
The first series of The Last Leg during the 2012 Paralympics received strong reviews and regularly pulled in more than a million viewers each night. Adam Hills was quoted as saying "If the Paralympics is covered well, it can change the way Jim Davidson looks at and treats people with disabilities". The Daily Mirror described The Last Leg as "a real success". Veteran TV pundit Clive James said: "Taken as a whole, the Channel 4 coverage of the Paralympics was very good, but almost the best part of it was The Last Leg, the discussion show at the end of each day".

The programme provoked a discussion in the media about whether disability and comedy could work together on TV. The Independent described it as "a high risk venture", saying that Hills "reminds us frequently that he has a prosthetic leg, giving him licence to crack jokes that most of us wouldn't dream of." Frances Ryan, for The Guardian, described it as "often tasteless, sometimes awkward, always funny". Damon Rose for BBC News said that "Comedian Adam Hills' late night irreverent Para-chat show The Last Leg – a title reflecting Adam's lack of a segment of his lower limb – has taken mainstream viewers to dark and delightfully surprising places that only disability humour can go. And it has given a sense of permission for regular viewers to talk openly about things they may previously have shied away from".

Brooker's 2015 interview with Nick Clegg for the programme was described by political journalist Hugo Rifkind as "a model of how to talk normally to a politician – and make them talk normally back".

== Awards and nominations ==
Year	Association	Category	Nominee(s)	Result
2017	Diversity in Media Awards	TV Programme of the Year	The Last Leg	Nominated
2017	Royal Television Society Awards	Entertainment	Adam Hills, Alex Brooker & Josh Widdicombe, The Last Leg	Won
2017	British Academy Television Awards	Best Entertainment Performance	Adam Hills	Nominated
2017	British Academy Television Awards	Best Comedy and Comedy Entertainment Programme	The Last Leg	Nominated
2018	Royal Television Society Awards	Best Entertainment Performance	Adam Hills, Alex Brooker & Josh Widdicombe	Nominated
2019	Royal Television Society Awards	Best Entertainment Programme	The Last Leg	Won
