= Dave Clarke (English footballer) =

English footballer

Personal information
- Full name: David Leslie Clarke
- Date of birth: 24 July 1949 (age 77)
- Place of birth: Newcastle upon Tyne, England
- Position: Goalkeeper

Youth career
- –: Montague B.C.
- –: Fenham B.C.
- –: Newcastle United

Senior career*
Years	Team	Apps	(Gls)
1967–1969	Newcastle United	0	(0)
1969–1970	Doncaster Rovers	3	(0)
1970	→ Darlington (loan)	12	(0)
–	South Shields		
–1977	Gateshead United		
1977–1987	Blyth Spartans		

International career
–	England Semi-pro XI	16	(0)

Managerial career
- 1988: Blyth Spartans
- * Club domestic league appearances and goals

David Leslie Clarke (born 24 July 1949) is an English former footballer who made 15 appearances in the Football League playing for Doncaster Rovers and Darlington. A goalkeeper, Clark began his career with Newcastle United without representing them in the league, and went on to play non-league football for clubs including South Shields, Gateshead United and Blyth Spartans.

Clarke spent more than ten years with Spartans, kept goal in their run to the fifth round of the 1977–78 FA Cup, and was capped 16 times for England at semi-professional level. He also briefly managed the club.
