= MTV International =

Internet-based music network (2006-2007)

- Type: Internet network (Music)
- Country: International
- Availability: Worldwide
- Owner: Viacom Media Networks (Viacom International)
- Launch date: 17 August 2006; 20 years ago
- Dissolved: 22 June 2007; 19 years ago
- Former affiliations: See List of MTV channels
- Official website: www.myspace.com/mtvinternational

MTV International, also known as Music Television International and MTVI, was the internet-based international version of MTV. The channel was a subsidiary of MTV Networks. The channel was broadcast on MySpace on MTV International's blog, and powered by YouTube.

Launched on August 17, 2006, the purpose of the channel was to give commercial-free music videos, once the original MTV had started concentrating on shows unrelated to music videos or music-related programming. MTV International also aired music-related specials and a few non-musical programs aimed at viewers in their teens and young adults.

== History ==
MTV International's first music video to air was Paris Hilton's "Stars Are Blind". MTV International showed a variety of remixes and original versions of songs from internationally known artists and locally known artists from various countries, as well as live performances of songs. The channel allowed viewers to vote for their favorite videos. MTV International was the first MTV Network to be fully broadcast on the internet. MTV International played both old and new videos that are currently shown on other networks like MTV Hits and MTV Jams.

MTV International featured VJs and languages from different MTV channels around the globe. MTV International also showed music video specials such as "MTVI's Cool Christmas","MTV AVMA Week", "MTV VMAJ Week", and "MTV VMA Week" which played music videos based on subjects such as Christmas, Australia Video Music Awards, Video Music Awards Japan, MTV Video Music Awards. A goal of MTV International was breaking "the barrier that does not allow certain artists and music to countries like America".

The channel started to air more shows as its popularity grew. Some were uploaded without permission to Internet video website YouTube, which were later taken down due to copyright infringement. MTVI created an Anti-Copyright Videos Zone Only, since its parent company Viacom was suing YouTube and its owner Google for over 12,000 unauthorized videos on YouTube, uploaded since February 2, 2007. MTV International also made some changes to the channel; playlists were no longer on a separate page from the blog. MTV International relaunched on Saturday, May 6, 2007, at 3:14 am GST/3:14 pm DST. The channel on MySpace recovered after weeks of technical difficulties. All shows were planned to go back on schedule by May 12, 2007.

Music Television International shut down on June 22, 2007, after the channel was receiving few viewers. The channel still broadcast over YouTube after the shutdown but closed its YouTube channel shortly after. Some of the last music videos that MTVI showed on its channel were JYONGRI - "Possession", Hyori Lee - "10 Minutes", Plain White T's - "Hey There Delilah", and Michael Bublé - "Everything". Bhav Singh served as the Managing Director and Executive Vice President of the Emerging Markets of the MTVI.

== Shows/programming ==
- Pop Block
- Rock Block (formerly known as MTV's Rock On!)
- Drake & Josh
- VH1 International Block
- Jump Start
- All Access
- I Got a Rocket...
- Wake-Up Video
- After Hours
- MTVI's Cafe
- Fresh New Music
- MTV Urban Beats (never premiered)
- Breakfast Club
- Sunrise Videos
- Sunset Videos
- Morning Videos
- Afternoon Videos
- NITE CLUB
- Late Nite
- PLAYLIST
- Top 20
- MTVI's World Express Chat Countdown
- US Top 20 (MTV America version) (also MTVI's version of VSpot Top 20 Countdown)
- MTV Canada's Top 5 (MTVI version)
- MTV Korea's Top 5 (MTVI version)
- Top Choice (International version)
- Amp (International version)
- Block of Music Videos (formerly known as Music Videos)
- MTV LIVE (International version)
- Making the Video (International version)
- MTVI VMA Week
- MTVI AVMA Week
- MTVI VMAJ Week
- Super GALS! (never premiered)
- Samurai Champloo (never premiered)
- VH1 on MTVI (never premiered)
- Top International 30

== See also ==
- MTV Networks
- List of MTV channels
- MySpace
- Viacom
