= 2020 in British television =

This is a list of events that took place in 2020 relating to television in the United Kingdom.

== Events ==
=== January ===
| Date | Event |
|---|---|
| 1 | Part One of "Spyfall", the first episode of Series 12 of Doctor Who, is broadcast on BBC One. The episode sees the return of the Doctor's adversary, the Master, portrayed by Sacha Dhawan, as well as featuring Stephen Fry and Lenny Henry in prominent roles. Overnight viewing figures indicate an audience of 4.88 million viewers, making it the second-highest overnight viewership for the night after Emmerdale with an audience of 5 million. |
| 1 | Miranda Hart is reunited with the cast of her eponymous sitcom, Miranda to celebrate its tenth anniversary in a special show recorded at the London Palladium. |
| 1 | BBC One airs Craig David Rocks Big Ben Live to welcome in the New Year and also the new decade. |
| 1 | Dracula, a new three-part take on the Bram Stoker novel of the same name, begins airing on BBC One. |
| 2 | Figures released by the Broadcasters' Audience Research Board (BARB) indicate the 2019 Christmas special of Gavin & Stacey to be the most viewed scripted television programme of the 2010s, with an audience of 17.1 million. Only sporting events and the 2010 series of The X Factor were seen by more viewers. |
| 2 | The actress Amanda Henderson appears as a contestant on Celebrity Mastermind. By the following day a clip of her giving an incorrect answer to a question about the Swedish climate change activist Greta Thunberg has been watched more than five million times. When asked to name the teenage activist, Henderson replies with "Sharon", a response that prompts Thunberg to change the name on her Twitter account to Sharon in jest, and leads to some online criticism of the actress. |
| 4 | BBC Two airs an evening of programmes dedicated to Clive James, with two editions of Clive James's Postcard from... about Sydney and London, and an edition of Front Row Late featuring James from 2018. |
| 4 | The Masked Singer, a reality show based on a South Korean series of the same name, makes its British television debut on ITV. The premiere is watched by an average audience of 5.5 million, peaking at 6.5 million, making the show the highest rated show of the night. |
| 5 | Dancing on Ice returns for a twelfth series, and becomes the first UK competitive reality television show to pair a same-sex partnership, with Ian "H" Watkins teaming up with professional ice skater Matt Evers. |
| 6 | ITV revamps and extends its breakfast programming. The changes see Good Morning Britain being extended by 30 minutes, running until 9 am, with Lorraine on air for a full hour, from 9 am until 10 am. The change removes the historic 9.25 am demarcation between breakfast and daytime programming that had existed since breakfast television launched on ITV in 1983. |
| 8 | The Advertising Standards Authority upholds a complaint against Love Island contestant Molly Mae Hague over a social media post of her wearing an outfit from an online retailer that was not identifiable as advertising. |
| 10 | Samira Ahmed wins an equal pay case she brought against the BBC over the difference in pay between herself for presenting Newswatch and Jeremy Vine for presenting Points of View. |
| 12 | BBC Two airs Louis Theroux: Selling Sex, a documentary in which Louis Theroux examines the world of online sex workers in the United Kingdom. |
| 12 | Love Island returns to ITV2 for its sixth series, with Laura Whitmore as presenter. Overnight viewing figures indicate the launch episode of what is the first series to be aired in winter is seen by an average audience of 2.51 million; the figure is down 800,000 on the launch episode of the previous series aired in summer 2019. |
| 13 | ITV launches Week 3 of its "Creates" Ident package in 2020, designed by Saj Fareed and Asian Women's Resource Centre. |
| 14 | Love Island contestant Ollie Williams voluntarily leaves the show after less than three days as a participant. |
| 15 | BBC Director-General Tony Hall outlines plans that will see at least two-thirds of the BBC's staff based outside London by 2027. |
| 16 | Legislation is drafted before Parliament allowing the use of television cameras during trials at Crown Courts in England and Wales, but only the judges will be filmed. |
| 16 | Sandi Toksvig announces she is leaving her presenting role with The Great British Bake Off after three years. |
| 16 | Lewis actor Laurence Fox appears as a panelist on Question Time, where he clashes with an audience member who argues the media's treatment of Megan Markle, the Duchess of Sussex, has been racist. |
| 17 | 35 years after it was last on air, Crackerjack returns. |
| 20 | Tony Hall announces his intention to step down as Director-General of the BBC in Summer 2020 following seven years in the role. |
| 21 | Netflix reveals that its drama The Crown has been watched by 73 million households worldwide. |
| 22 | BBC media editor Amol Rajan confirms that The Victoria Derbyshire Show is to come to an end as part of £80m worth of savings being made to the BBC's news service. The programme will end later in the year, with BBC Director of News Fran Unsworth stating that it is "no longer cost-effective" to keep it on air. |
| 23 | The BBC announced that Brexitcast will be renamed Newscast after the United Kingdom leaves the European Union on 31 January. |
| 25 | Fans of The Goodies asked to choose their favourite episode of the 1970s comedy show have selected the sketch "Kung Fu Kapers" to be screened at a festival celebrating the series' 50th anniversary. |
| 26 | In the Doctor Who episode "Fugitive of the Judoon", Jo Martin makes history by becoming the first black actress to portray the role of the Doctor in a previously unseen incarnation of the Time Lord. |
| 27 | A petition to save the BBC Red Button service and signed by more than 100 organisations is handed to the BBC and 10 Downing Street. |
| 27 | ITV apologises following the broadcast of the previous weekend's installment of The Masked Singer during which panellist Jonathan Ross suggested one of the singers could be Natalie Cole, who died in 2015. |
| 28 | ITV broadcasts the 25th National Television Awards, with David Walliams as host. |
| 28 | Just a Minute and Sale of the Century host Nicholas Parsons dies aged 96 at the Stoke Mandeville Hospital near Aylesbury, Buckinghamshire. |
| 29 | BBC News announces it will shed 450 posts, including roles from Newsnight and BBC Radio 5 Live, as part of £80m worth of savings being made by the BBC. |
| 29 | The BBC suspends its plans to discontinue the red button text service, which was due to close on 30 January. |
| 29 | It is announced that ITV News presenter Alastair Stewart had been fired from his role after what ITV News described as "errors of judgment in [his] use of social media", though they would not elaborate on the nature of what happened. |
| 29 | Channel 4's First Dates is to move to a new venue, relocating from London to Manchester for the next series. |
| 30 | Brexitcast ends on TV 2 days prior to it ending on the radio. |
| 31 | Brexit Day, the day the United Kingdom leaves the European Union, is marked by all major broadcasters, including a BBC News special covering events, and editions of ITV News at Ten and Channel 4's The Last Leg dedicated to the occasion. There is also a live speech from Prime Minister Boris Johnson scheduled for broadcast at 10.00 pm (an hour before the UK's official exit) in which he attempts to reassure viewers that Brexit is "not an end, but a beginning", but both the BBC and ITV main news bulletins choose not to broadcast the three-minute speech in its entirety. |
| 31 | Imelda Staunton will play Queen Elizabeth II in the fifth and final series of the Netflix drama The Crown, it is announced. |
| 31 | Harley Bird, the actress who voices Peppa Pig, will step down from the role after more than a decade, it is announced. She was replaced by Amelie Bea Smith, who will make her debut in an episode of the cartoon shown on 14 February. |

=== February ===
| Date | Event |
|---|---|
| 2 | It is revealed that Caprice Bourret has left Dancing on Ice to "recover and look after herself and her family". |
| 4 | To coincide with the broadcast of Mary Beard's Shock of the Nude on BBC Two, BBC Two announces Life Drawing Live!, a two-hour programme presented by Josie D'Arby in which life drawing experts guide a group of artists in how to create a life drawing while viewers are also encouraged to create their own work. |
| 5 | Culture Secretary Nicky Morgan launches a public consultation about the possible decriminalisation of non-payment of the television licence. |
| 7 | Coronation Street airs its landmark 10,000th episode. |
| 7 | ITV announces that The X Factor will not return in 2020, but instead take a twelve-month break before returning in 2021 |
| 7 | This Morning presenter Phillip Schofield gives an interview to his co-presenter Holly Willoughby in which he speaks openly about his sexuality after releasing a statement on social media in which he comes out as gay. |
| 10 | ITV launches Week 7 of its "Creates" Ident package in 2020, designed by Hermione Allsopp and Hastings Furniture Service. |
| 11 | David Attenborough will present A Perfect Planet, a five-part series showing how natural forces help the world to thrive. |
| 11 | ITV axes its dating game show Take Me Out after eleven series. |
| 12 | The government announces plans to extend the remit of the media regulator Ofcom to include internet and social media content in the UK. |
| 13 | Oliver Dowden is appointed as Secretary of State for Digital, Culture, Media and Sport in a cabinet reshuffle, replacing Nicky Morgan. |
| 13 | The BBC announces that after forty-three years on BBC Two, Top Gear will move to BBC One for its twenty-ninth series. |
| 13 | Bill Turnbull will stand in for Piers Morgan as co-presenter of Good Morning Britain for three days while Morgan takes a break later in the month. |
| 14 | Fitness coach Joe Wicks becomes the latest celebrity to read a CBeebies Bedtime Story; he reads Love Monster and the Perfect Present by Rachel Bright. |
| 15 | ITV2 pulls the day's edition of Love Island from its schedule following the death (later confirmed as suicide) of the show's former presenter Caroline Flack. The following day's episode is also cancelled. |
| 15 | Nicola Roberts wins the first series of The Masked Singer as the "Queen Bee". Overnight figures indicate the show's grand final had an average audience of 6.4 million viewers. |
| 17 | Love Island returns to ITV2 with a tribute to Caroline Flack. |
| 18 | ITV broadcasts the 2020 Brit Awards, presented by Jack Whitehall. |
| 19 | EastEnders celebrates its 35th anniversary. |
| 21 | The BBC announces that its consumer affairs programme Watchdog will be subsumed into The One Show from Spring 2020. |
| 21 | June Brown makes her final onscreen appearance in EastEnders as Dot Cotton. |
| 22 | Ant & Dec's Saturday Night Takeaway returns to ITV for a new series after a two-year break. The first episode attracts 87 complaints to Ofcom following a raunchy performance by the Pussycat Dolls. |
| 23 | Finn Tapp and Paige Turley win series six of Love Island. |
| 26 | ITV announces a shakeup of its weekend Breakfast schedule that will see the launch of two new programmes. Kate Garraway will present Breakfast at Garraway's on Saturday, while Sundays will see Martin and Roman Kemp presenting Martin & Roman's Sunday Best. |
| 27 | Singer-songwriter James Newman is chosen to represent the United Kingdom at the 2020 Eurovision Song Contest with his song "My Last Breath". |
| 29 | The controversial Ken Russell film Dance of the Seven Veils about German composer Richard Strauss, which was last aired in February 1970, is to be screened at the 2020 Keswick Film Festival. The film attracted complaints at the time because of its sex scenes, and prompted Strauss's family to withdraw their permission for the use of his music after he was depicted as a Nazi sympathiser, a move that effectively banned the film from being shown again until the copyright on his work had expired. |

=== March ===
| Date | Event |
|---|---|
| 1 | The final episode of the twelfth series of Doctor Who, "The Timeless Children" airs on BBC One, causing widespread controversy, as it is revealed The Doctor is not from Gallifrey, not born a Time Lord, and had many lives before William Hartnell's incarnation. |
| 1 | Bath-set ITV crime drama McDonald & Dodds which features a pair of mismatched detectives starring Tala Gouveia and Jason Watkins makes its debut. |
| 2 | As cases of Coronavirus in the UK continue to increase, a BBC One programme Coronavirus: Everything You Need to Know addresses questions from the public on the outbreak. |
| 3 | Sky and Disney secure a deal to make the Disney+ streaming service available on Sky Q when the channel is launched later in the month. |
| 4 | Spitting Image co-creator Roger Law announces that it the show will return on BritBox after twenty-four years. |
| 6 | Kevin Clifton announces he is leaving Strictly Come Dancing after seven years. |
| 7 | Michael and Jowita win the second series of The Greatest Dancer. |
| 8 | Joe Swash and dance partner Alex Murphy win series twelve of Dancing on Ice. |
| 11 | Georgie Mills wins series five of Got What It Takes?. |
| 13 | Sport Relief 2020 goes ahead in front of a live audience in Salford despite the cancellation of a number of other events involving the gathering of large crowds due to the Coronavirus pandemic. The event raises £40 million by the end of the evening, with co-presenter Gary Lineker saying "a chunk" of the funds raised will go towards those affected by the pandemic. |
| 13 | ITV confirms that the following day's edition of Ant & Dec's Saturday Night Takeaway will be broadcast live and in front of a studio audience as normal. However, the series finale, scheduled to be broadcast from Walt Disney World in Florida will no longer go ahead after the resort announced its intention to close as a precautionary measure. |
| 14 | Manchester's Victoria Baths, featured in a multitude of television series such as Coronation Street, Cold Feet and Peaky Blinders, is to open to the public for an exhibition highlighting its use as a backdrop for television series. |
| 15 | The government announces plans to hold daily televised press conferences to update the public on the fight against the Coronavirus pandemic, starting on Monday 16 March. |
| 16 | The BBC delays its planned changes to TV licences for the over-75s from June to August because of the Coronavirus pandemic. |
| 16 | ITV announce that Coronation Street and Emmerdale will "remind people of important public health issues" like hand-washing because of the Coronavirus pandemic. The filming schedule for both soaps has so far been disrupted by the pandemic, but series such as Peaky Blinders and Line of Duty have delayed the filming of forthcoming series. |
| 16 | ITV launches Week 12 of its "Creates" Ident package in 2020, designed by on the Mend & NHS Staff. |
| 17 | The BBC announces major changes to the schedule across the network. While programmes such as Politics Live, Victoria Derbyshire, The Andrew Neil Show, Newswatch, The Travel Show and HARDTalk have been suspended, others such as Newsnight and The Andrew Marr Show will continue with a smaller number of production staff. Question Time is moved to an earlier 8 pm Thursday timeslot and will be broadcast without an audience from a fixed location. Podcasts programmes Americast, Beyond Today and The Next Episode are also suspended. |
| 18 | The European Broadcasting Union announces the cancellation of the 2020 Eurovision Song Contest, which was scheduled to be held in Rotterdam during the week of 11 May. A special programme focusing on the artists that would have taken part in the contest, known as Eurovision: Europe Shine a Light, would later be announced to air on the date reserved for the grand final, which was 16 May. |
| 18 | The BBC announces that the 50th anniversary of Glastonbury Festival has been cancelled. As a replacement, the BBC will show past editions of the Glastonbury Festival later in June 2020. |
| 18 | The BBC announces that due to the Coronavirus pandemic, filming on Casualty, Doctors, EastEnders, Holby City, Pobol y Cwm and River City is suspended until further notice. Weekly episodes of EastEnders will also be reduced from four to two to keep it on the air for as long as possible. |
| 18 | The BBC says that it will show more educational programmes to cater for children not attending school, and that it is in talks with the Department for Education and schools to support GCSE and A Level curriculums with extra programmes on BBC Four and the BBC Red Button service. |
| 18 | ITV announce that the filming schedule for Coronation Street will change from the week beginning 30 March, with the number of weekly episodes reduced from six to three. Emmerdale will also change its pattern from the usual six episodes to three as well. |
| 18 | The semi-final of the ninth series of The Voice UK, scheduled for Saturday 28 March, is postponed until later in the year, while 21 March edition of Ant & Dec's Saturday Night Takeaway will go ahead without a live studio audience. This episode is watched by an average of 9.5 million viewers, peaking at 11.1 million, making the show the highest rated show of 2020 until the premiere of I'm A Celebrity... Get Me Out Of Here! averages 13.8 million. |
| 18 | The BBC and ITV announce major revamps of their schedules to include a weekly programme giving the public information about the Coronavirus pandemic; the BBC will also air more programmes focused on health, fitness, education, religion and food recipes. |
| 18 | Despite the Coronavirus pandemic, ITV proceeds the debut of café-set sitcom Kate & Koji as planned. The show features Vera actress Brenda Blethyn as Kate Abbott, alongside the African asylum-seeking doctor Koji, played by Jimmy Akingbola. |
| 19 | Fitness expert Diana Moran, known as the Green Goddess when she presented keep fit sessions on BBC Breakfast Time during the 1980s, is to make a return to breakfast television to give fitness advice to people in self-isolation because of the Coronavirus pandemic. She will present a slot on BBC Breakfast three times a week. |
| 20 | The BBC brings forward its adaptation of Enid Blyton's Malory Towers series by two weeks, making it available on BBC iPlayer from Monday 23 March. The series is also scheduled to begin airing on the CBBC channel from April. |
| 20 | Filming on the scripted reality television show The Only Way is Essex is suspended temporarily because of the Coronavirus pandemic. |
| 22 | ITV announces that filming on Coronation Street and Emmerdale will be temporarily halted from Monday 23 March. Its daytime programmes Lorraine and Loose Women will also temporarily cease live broadcasting. |
| 23 | In a televised address, Prime Minister Boris Johnson announces a UK-wide lockdown with immediate effect, to contain the spread of the Coronavirus. People can leave their homes only for "very limited purposes" – shopping for basic necessities; for one form of exercise a day; for any medical need; and to travel to and from work when "absolutely necessary". A number of other restrictions are imposed, with police given powers to enforce the measures, including the use of fines. Overnight viewing figures indicate the address, the first such Prime Ministerial broadcast since that by Tony Blair at the time of the Iraq War in 2003, to have been watched by a collective audience of at least 27.1 million viewers, placing it high on the list of most watched television broadcasts in the United Kingdom with the greatest number since the 2012 Summer Olympics closing ceremony in London. |
| 23 | ITV revises its previous decision and announces that Emmerdale will now broadcast only three times a week from 30 March. |
| 23 | DisneyLife closes to be replaced by Disney+. |
| 24 | BBC News announces that it is delaying plans to cut 450 news jobs due to the pressure of covering the Coronavirus pandemic. |
| 24 | Disney+ launches in the UK, featuring The Mandalorian, High School Musical: The Musical: The Series, Forky Asks a Question and more. It is also the first streaming service in the UK to feature The Simpsons after Sky and Disney secured a deal to make Disney+ available on Sky Q. |
| 26 | Doctors celebrates its 20th anniversary with a 60-minute episode. The episode sees the return of Julia Parsons (Diane Keen) after eight years. |
| 26 | The fifteenth anniversary of Doctor Who's return to television is celebrated by fans across the world with a mass viewing of "Rose", the first episode from the 2005 series. |
| 26 | BBC Scotland soap River City announces plans to donate medical properties to the NHS to help fight Coronavirus. The items include surgical gloves, masks and scrubs that would be used by actors during filming of the series. |
| 26 | AJ Pritchard announces he is leaving Strictly Come Dancing after four years. |
| 26 | At 8pm, millions of people around the country take part in a "Clap for Carers" tribute, applauding the NHS and other care workers. The event is aired by radio and television outlets. |
| 29 | The team who designed costumes for the TV adaptation of Philip Pullman's His Dark Materials series establish Helping Dress Medics, an organisation dedicated to manufacturing scrubs for medical staff fighting Coronavirus. |
| 30 | Matt Baker signs off as co-presenter of The One Show after nine years, doing so from home due to having to self-isolate after a relative tested positive for Coronavirus. The BBC says it has some plans to replace him, but will instead draw on the show's existing team to co-present with Alex Jones. |

=== April ===
| Date | Event |
|---|---|
| 1 | The BBC announces that the 2020 Wimbledon Championships has been cancelled due to the Covid-19 pandemic. It is the first time that the Wimbledon Championships are not held because of the World Wars between 1915–1918 and 1940–1945. |
| 2 | The Northern Irish ITV franchise UTV temporary suspends its branding and local continuity due to the Coronavirus pandemic. The channel begins carrying ITV branding and using ITV announcements as a result. |
| 2 | BBC sports presenter Gary Lineker announces that he is donating £140,000 to the British Red Cross towards research into Coronavirus. |
| 3 | The BBC announces it will offer daily educational programming to help children with schoolwork at home during lockdown beginning on 20 April, describing it as the biggest education push "in its history". |
| 5 | Queen Elizabeth II makes a rare televised broadcast to the UK and the wider Commonwealth, something she has done on only four previous occasions (other than Christmas broadcasts). In the address she thanks people for following the government's social distancing rules and pays tribute to key workers, and says the UK "will succeed" in its fight against Coronavirus but may have "more still to endure". The broadcast gains 23.97 million viewers. |
| 6 | Daily Kitchen, a follow-up programme of Saturday Kitchen begins a two-week run on BBC One, intended as a way of helping people isolated at home to cook a meal using limited food resources. |
| 10 | The BBC has donated fully working ventilators from the set of Holby City to London's NHS Nightingale Hospital to help treat patients with Coronavirus. |
| 15 | Ofcom receive 643 complaints about an angry exchange between Piers Morgan and government minister Helen Whately on the day's edition of Good Morning Britain which occurs during a discussion about Coronavirus deaths in care homes. A further 966 complaints are received following a second "car crash" interview on 22 April. |
| 17 | Thomas Frake wins the 2020 series of MasterChef. |
| 19 | BBC One airs highlights of Together at Home, a virtual global benefit concert staged to celebrate healthcare workers and featuring musicians playing from home. The lineup includes Paul McCartney, Lady Gaga, Billie Eilish and The Rolling Stones. This UK version of the concert also features the stories of frontline workers, as well as extra footage of British artists such as Paul McCartney, Elton John and Ellie Goulding. The coverage is presented by Claudia Winkleman, Dermot O'Leary and Clara Amfo. |
| 23 | BBC One airs The Big Night In, a first-of-its-kind joint broadcast with Children in Need and Comic Relief, and featuring an evening of music and entertainment. The broadcast celebrates the acts of kindness, humour and the spirit of hope and resilience that is keeping the nation going during the unprecedented Coronavirus pandemic, with viewers given a chance to donate to a fund helping local charities and projects around the country. The event raises £27m for charity, with the government pledging to double that amount. |
| 26 | Uncle and nephew Emon and Jamiul Choudhury win series two of Race Across the World. |
| 26 | Following the announcement of the United Kingdom going into its first national lockdown, Gemma Collins is unable continue filming for her new series of Gemma Collins: Diva, and therefore invites a camera crew into her home to film a new series Gemma Collins: Diva on Lockdown, which follows Collins and her family as they adjust to life in lockdown. |
| 27 | Ofcom says it will investigate Piers Morgan over his "combative" interviews with government ministers. A total of 4,000 complaints have been generated over the interviews, 3,200 of them relating to two clashes with Minister for Social Care Helen Whately. |
| 27 | ITV launches a new spin-off to The Chase titled Beat the Chasers. |
| 29 | Steph McGovern announces she is halting her home made daily lunchtime Channel 4 show, The Steph Show, so that her family can have their home back. McGovern has presented the show from her lounge because of the lockdown restrictions, but it will move to Channel 4's studios in Leeds when it returns later in the year. |
| 30 | ITV announces plans to resume filming live studio-based shows such as Britain's Got Talent and The Masked Singer, but without the presence of an audience. |

=== May ===
| Date | Event |
|---|---|
| 2 | An episode of Casualty that details a real-life viral outbreak is pulled from BBC One's schedule after being deemed as inappropriate. The broadcast is replaced by the next episode in the series, with a summary of the skipped episode being shown beforehand. The skipped episode is broadcast in full on 26 September. |
| 2 | British children's TV show Thomas & Friends celebrates 75 years of The Railway Series by airing a special episode on Channel 5's Milkshake! called "Thomas and the Royal Engine". |
| 3 | ITV announce that, due to the suspension of production of soap operas Coronation Street and Emmerdale because of the Coronavirus pandemic back in March, their ITV3 re-runs of classic episodes of both soaps respectively will be made available shortly after broadcast on the streaming catch-up ITV Hub from 5 May. A new collection of the best of episodes from Coronation Street and Emmerdale will also launch on BritBox on 14 May. |
| 4 | BBC One introduces a set of new idents reflecting social distancing. |
| 4 | Richard Madeley and Judy Finnigan return to Channel 4 with Richard & Judy: Keep Reading and Carry On, a week-long programme where they recommend books to read during the lockdown. The programme is filmed from their home. |
| 4 | ITV2 permanently cancels the summer 2020 series of Love Island, meaning the series will next air in 2021. |
| 6 | Coronation Street producer Iain MacLeod says the soap will include storylines that see characters dealing with the Coronavirus outbreak when filming resumes, but it will not "dominate every single story". |
| 8 | 8 May 2020 marks the 75th anniversary of VE Day and the occasion is marked by a series of special programmes on television. Highlights include a day of programmes on BBC One and a tribute to Captain Tom Moore on ITV. The Queen also addresses the nation with a TV broadcast at 9 pm, at the exact moment her father, George VI did in 1945. |
| 12 | The government give soaps including Coronation Street, Doctors, EastEnders, Emmerdale and Hollyoaks permission to resume filming. |
| 12 | E4 announces a series titled Big Brother's Best Shows set to air in the summer, to mark Big Brother's 20th anniversary. |
| 14 | The BBC announces plans to resume the filming of EastEnders and Top Gear in June, with cast and crew practising social distancing, and doing their own hair and makeup. |
| 14 | Mwaka Mudenda joins Blue Peter as its 39th presenter, joining the show from home because of the lockdown restrictions. |
| 16 | BBC One airs Eurovision: Come Together and Eurovision: Europe Shine a Light to mark the permanently cancelled 2020 Eurovision Song Contest. In the first programme viewers choose their favourite Eurovision song (selecting ABBA's "Waterloo"), while the second programme, broadcast by all countries participating in the competition, showcases the forty-one acts that would have appeared in Eurovision 2020. |
| 21 | BBC Two airs the Horizon documentary "What's the Matter with Tony Slattery?" in which comedian Tony Slattery explores his psychological problems with experts, and attempts to confront addiction and childhood trauma. |
| 21 | ITV announces that Emmerdale has started a "phased return to filming" with six new episodes being recorded at its studios in Leeds. The episodes will show characters dealing with lockdown and reflecting on past feuds. |
| 22 | Doctors announce that they are filming a lockdown episode featuring Zara Carmichael (Elisabeth Dermot Walsh), filmed from Walsh's home using an iPhone X. |
| 22 | The cast of the BBC's W1A have reunited for a one-off Zoom meeting, which is made available to watch on YouTube. |
| 26 | The BBC announces plans to show classic performances from the Glastonbury Festival over the weekend of 26–28 June, when the festival was scheduled to take place. |
| 26 | Laura Rollins announces her departure from her role as Ayesha Lee on Doctors. |
| 27 | The BBC says that BBC Two's Newsnight breached impartiality guidelines with an introduction about government chief adviser Dominic Cummings on the previous day's edition. Referring to Cummings apparent breach of lockdown regulations, presenter Emily Maitlis said "the country can see" Cummings had "broken the rules". |
| 27 | Sky launches Sky Documentaries and Sky Nature, and rebrands History to Sky History. |
| 28 | Royal Mail issues a set of stamps to mark the 60th anniversary of Coronation Street. |
| 28 | Following the Premier League's decision to restart the 2020–21 season on 17 June, it is announced that all remaining 92 matches from the season will air live on television, including four on the BBC. Sky Sports will also air 25 matches free-to-air. |
| 28 | The final "Clap for Our Carers" event takes place, with coverage broadcast by BBC One and ITV, as well as on social media. |
| 29 | The BBC appoints Richard Sambrook, its former director of global news and current director of journalism of Cardiff University, to review online behaviour of programmes and staff, particularly regarding their social media posting. |
| 29 | The 2020 British Academy Television Awards, originally scheduled for 17 May, are rescheduled for 31 July and will be held virtually. The ceremony will be presented by Richard Ayoade with award recipients giving acceptance speeches via video conferencing. |

=== June ===
| Date | Event |
|---|---|
| 1 | ITV announces plans to resume filming of Coronation Street from 9 June following an eleven-week break. ITV have aired three episodes a week since March, and the new filming schedule will allow that number of weekly episodes to continue airing going forward. |
| 2 | The UK government is to scale back its daily Downing Street briefings to weekdays only, citing low viewing figures at weekends. |
| 3 | The BBC announces plans to air an EastEnders spinoff series titled Secrets From The Square, hosted by Stacey Dooley, where Dooley interviews cast members on their experiences on the programme. They also announce that old episodes of EastEnders will be aired due to running out of episodes. |
| 4 | The BBC announces that it will show highlights of every test match and one day international played by the England cricket team during 2020, starting with three test matches against the West Indies in July. |
| 5 | Tim Davie, the current chief executive of BBC Studios, is appointed the next Director-General of the BBC, replacing Tony Hall from September. |
| 6 | BT Sport viewers are given the option of hearing artificial crowd noise while watching coverage of Bundesliga football matches to make the experience seem more authentic. The option will also be available when English Premier League football returns on 17 June. |
| 7 | Channel 4 broadcasts the entire 1966 FIFA World Cup Final between England and West Germany. Aired as Final Replay '66, special permission is given by FIFA for the match to be shown in aide of the National Emergencies Trust's Coronavirus Appeal. The programme is presented by Gabby Logan, with commentary from Geoff Hurst and Glenn Hoddle. The match is also livestreamed via All 4. |
| 8 | Emmerdale episodes are reduced to two for three weeks on Mondays and Wednesdays. |
| 8 | Hollyoaks launches an investigation after the actress Rachel Adedeji alleges she witnessed racism on the Channel 4 soap. |
| 9 | BBC iPlayer, Netflix and BritBox all announce that all episodes of both Little Britain and Come Fly With Me have been removed, due to their use of white actors in black makeup. |
| 10 | Vas J Morgan, a cast member of ITV's reality series The Only Way Is Essex, accuses the programme of "systematic racism" because he says he was treated differently to white cast members and "put into situations that perpetuated the same racial stereotype". |
| 10 | Ant & Dec apologise for impersonating "people of colour" on their ITV show Saturday Night Takeaway. |
| 11 | The League of Gentlemen and The Mighty Boosh are removed from Netflix due to their use of white actors in black makeup, but both series remain available on BBC iPlayer. |
| 12 | Doctors airs an episode set in cast members' homes filmed using their mobile phones, marking it as a first for a soap opera. The episode, titled "Can You Hear Me?", has an extended runtime of 45 minutes. The soap goes on its annual summer transmission break after the episode. |
| 12 | With EastEnders due to go off air after 16 June because it has run out of pre-lockdown episodes, it is announced that the soap will return later in the year with shorter, 20-minute episodes, but will go back to airing four nights a week. |
| 12 | John Cleese criticises the BBC as "cowardly and gutless" after an episode of Fawlty Towers is temporarily removed from the UKTV streaming service because it contains "racial slurs". UKTV says it will reinstate the 1975 episode, "The Germans", once it has updated it with guidance and contextual information. |
| 15 | A BBC drama written by Jimmy McGovern is to portray the life of Anthony Walker, who was killed in a racially motivated attack in 2005. However, instead of showing the events that happened and the life he lived, the film will show the life the teenager may have lived had he not been killed. The film is aired on BBC One on 27 July. |
| 15 | Misha B, a contestant on the 2011 series of The X Factor, accuses the show of having a "corrupted agenda" and pushing an "angry black girl narrative" on her when she participated. Following her comments, Tulisa Contostavlos, who was a judge on the eighth series, apologises for accusing Misha B of bullying during the programme. |
| 15 | ITV2 announces the cancellation of the planned winter 2021 series of Love Island due to continuing concerns over international travel that could possibly last into the beginning of 2021. ITV2 pledges to air an extended series in summer 2021 instead. |
| 16 | BBC One airs the final episode of EastEnders to be recorded before filming was suspended in March. |
| 17–19 | BBC Sport airs coverage of the V-Series Women's Tour, a virtual cycling tour held because of the Coronavirus outbreak. Commentary on the event is provided by Marty MacDonald and Joanna Rowsell Shand. |
| 20 | A Premier League match between Bournemouth and Crystal Palace becomes the first Premier League game to be aired live by the BBC, and the first English top-flight match to be broadcast live on BBC television since 1988. The match is watched by an average of 3.6 million, peaking at 3.9 million. |
| 21 | BBC One debuts The Luminaries, a series based on book of the same name by Eleanor Catton. Although it receives positive reviews from some critics, the first episode attracts criticism from viewers and critics because of a number of scenes that are difficult to follow due to poor lighting. |
| 22 | The BBC announces plans to invest £10m over three years to produce "diverse and inclusive content". |
| 23 | Prime Minister Boris Johnson leads the UK government's final televised daily Downing Street coronavirus briefing. From now on press briefings will be held whenever there is a significant announcement. |
| 24 | The BBC postpones series sixteen of The Apprentice in the interests of "production safety and the wellbeing of everyone involved". |
| 25 | The BBC confirms that Strictly Come Dancing will return for its eighteenth series in the Autumn, but will be shorter than usual due to the Coronavirus epidemic. |
| 25 | BBC Two airs the first episode of QI to be recorded without a studio audience; the edition was recorded in March 2020 during the Coronavirus outbreak. |
| 25 | The Walt Disney Company announce that owing to the launch of Disney+, Disney XD, Disney Channel and Disney Junior will close down on 1 October, as well as their respective timeshift channels (with the exception of DXD's timeshift, which ceased broadcasting prior to the announcement). |
| 28 | The Bachelor has been cancelled by Channel 5 after just one series. |

=== July ===
| Date | Event |
|---|---|
| 2 | In a bid to save £25m by 2022, the BBC announces plans to cut 450 jobs in its regional television news and current affairs programming, local radio and online news services in England. These will include restructuring some regional programmes, and making permanent changes to local radio that were introduced during the COVID-19 outbreak. |
| 4 | As lockdown restrictions are eased in England, allowing hairdressers to reopen, BBC political correspondent Chris Mason has a haircut live on air to mark the occasion. |
| 8 | BBC, ITV, Channel 4, Channel 5 and all of its sister stations simultaneously air a short film titled "Our Stories" at 8:58pm, which marks and celebrates the role UK broadcasters play across its culture. |
| 9 | The BBC confirms it will go ahead with plans to end free TV licences for over-75s from 1 August, except for those on pension credit. |
| 13 | MTV announce that MTV Rocks, Club MTV and MTV OMG are set to close on 20 July 2020. |
| 13 | ITV announces a three-part sequel to its award-winning drama The Murder of Stephen Lawrence that will focus on the fight to convict Lawrence's killers. |
| 13 | Hollyoaks resume filming, and confirm that episodes will run out on 21 July. |
| 14 | ITV announces its chief football commentator Clive Tyldesley is to be replaced by Talksport presenter Sam Matterface from the start of the next season. Tyldesley says he is "upset, annoyed" and "baffled" by the decision. |
| 15 | The BBC confirms that the BBC Two politics programme The Andrew Neil Show will not return to screens as part of cuts to its news service. The programme has been off air during the Coronavirus pandemic, but the BBC are in talks with Neil about a new political programme for BBC One. |
| 15 | BBC One Wales and BBC Two Wales begin broadcasting from new studios in Cardiff's Central Square. |
| 17 | Coronation Street announce that Rachel Leskovac will reprise her role of Natasha Blakeman after ten years away from the soap. |
| 20 | Channel 4 transmits the final episode of Hollyoaks to be recorded before filming was suspended in March. They also premiere an autumn trailer composed of scenes from unfinished episodes, set to air in September. |
| 22 | CBBC broadcast an episode of The Next Step featuring two teenage girls kissing. This was the first same-sex kiss to be aired on the channel. Amidst both praise and criticism, the BBC defend the scene by stating: "CBBC is proud to reflect all areas of children's lives, including age appropriate representation of same sex relationships". |
| 24 | Producers of the second series of BBC One's His Dark Materials confirm an episode had to be abandoned because of lockdown. The series was largely finished by the time lockdown was implemented, but a standalone episode had not been filmed. It is unknown whenever a lost episode of it would be aired. The seven-part series will air later in the year. |
| 27 | As part of measures to tackle obesity, Prime Minister Boris Johnson announces a UK-wide ban on junk food advertising on television before 9.00pm. |
| 27 | E4 begin airing a special series of Celebrities Go Dating titled Celebrities Go Virtual Dating, filmed in response to the pandemic. Social distancing measures were implemented during production. |
| 28 | The BBC axes the teatime edition of Newsround after 48 years, since they concluded that the typical child no longer turns on traditional television channels when they return home from school. They will focus on the morning edition instead which will be aimed at schools, where it is often used by teachers in classrooms, in addition to investing in the programme's website. |
| 29 | The UK government announces a £500m scheme to help film and television with the costs of projects delayed or abandoned because of the Coronavirus pandemic. |
| 30 | ITV announce that Coronation Street and Emmerdale will return to transmitting six weekly episodes in September. |
| 31 | The delayed 2020 British Academy Television Awards are held as a virtual ceremony and aired live on BBC One. |

=== August ===
| Date | Event |
|---|---|
| 1 | The BBC ends automatic free television licences for the over-75s, with the exception of those claiming pension credit. |
| 4 | The BBC defends its use of the N-word during a report about a racially motivated attack on its BBC Points West news programme on 29 July, saying the victim's family had asked that the language be included in the report so that people could understand what had happened. Within two days the BBC has received more than 18,500 complaints about the programme's use of the word. |
| 5 | New puppet caricatures of public figures are unveiled ahead of the return of the satirical show Spitting Image, including likenesses of Prime Minister Boris Johnson, his special adviser Dominic Cummings, and Prince Andrew. |
| 6 | An inquest into the death of television presenter Caroline Flack records a verdict of death by suicide. |
| 7 | ITV confirms that Series 20 of I'm a Celebrity...Get Me Out of Here! will be relocated from its usual venue in the Australian jungle to a ruined castle in the UK. |
| 9 | BBC Director-General Tony Hall apologises following the use of a racial slur during an item on the 29 July edition of its regional news programme BBC Points West. |
| 10 | The BBC confirms that Doctors has resumed filming, following the suspension of production in March. |
| 11 | Ofcom launches an investigation into ITV after the broadcaster admits not including some free postal entries in its prize draws. |
| 12 | A routine Freeview retune leaves a number of customers without some of their channels, prompting the company to advise those affected to call their helpline. |
| 13 | Netflix announces that Jonathan Pryce will play Prince Philip in the final two series of its royal drama, The Crown, starring opposite Imelda Staunton as Queen Elizabeth II. |
| 14 | Lime Pictures, producers of Hollyoaks, launch a guardian scheme to help tackle racial inequality among its cast members. |
| 16 | Australian actress Elizabeth Debicki is cast in the role of Diana, Princess of Wales for the final two series of The Crown. |
| 17 | ITV confirms that The Masked Singer will become the first UK television show to resume production with a studio audience when it returns to filming in September. |
| 18 | Following the death of Emmerdale actress Sheila Mercier in December 2019, it is announced that her character Annie Sugden is to be killed off off-screen on 28 August. |
| 20 | Fran Unsworth, the head of BBC News, tells the Daily Telegraph traditional news bulletins may be reduced over the coming decade as more people source their news from online content. |
| 21 | Who Wants to Be a Millionaire? presenter Jeremy Clarkson confirms a contestant on the next series of the quiz show has won the £1m prize, the first to do so in 14 years. |
| 21 | Bruno Tonioli confirms he will not be behind the judges' desk for some of the 18th series of Strictly Come Dancing, while he takes part in the US version. Instead he will appear virtually. |
| 21 | Channel 4 announce that filming on Ackley Bridge is set to resume in September, with the fourth series set to air across two weeks in 2021. |
| 25 | Following a Sunday Times report that the BBC plans has considered dropping "Rule, Britannia!" and "Land of Hope and Glory" from the Last Night of the Proms because of links to colonialism and slavery, the BBC confirms that instrumental versions will be performed instead, but the words will be included again once the Coronavirus pandemic is over. |
| 25 | Channel 4 announces plans to hold a "black takeover day" in 2021 to "kickstart a fresh push for greater on and off-screen representation". |
| 25 | Filming recommences on BBC Scotland's soap River City. |
| 27 | On the 20th anniversary of Location, Location, Location, a new series called Location, Location, Location: 20 Years and Counting will see Kirstie Allsopp and Phil Spencer look back on their years of house-hunting on the show. |
| 27 | Sky Two rebrands as Sky Replay and continues to repeat programmes shown on Sky One and Sky Witness. |
| 27 | ITV confirms that Series 20 of I'm a Celebrity...Get Me Out of Here! will be filmed at Gwrych Castle in north Wales. |
| 27 | The BBC announces that EastEnders will use the real-life partners of cast members as body doubles in order to film intimate scenes such as kissing. |
| 29 | BBC One broadcasts the 2020 Women's FA Community Shield between Chelsea and Manchester City, the first Women's Community Shield to be held since 2008. |
| 29 | Media reports surface of plans to launch a Fox News-style channel for the UK to rival the BBC and offer a conservative leaning perspective on current affairs, with two rival groups putting forward proposals. |

=== September ===
| Date | Event |
|---|---|
| 1 | Tim Davie succeeds Tony Hall as Director-General of the BBC. |
| 1 | Northern Ireland YouTube star Adam Beales is confirmed as Blue Peter's 40th presenter, and joins Lindsey Russell, Richie Driss and Mwaka Mudenda. |
| 2 | The BBC reverses its decision not to have the words of "Rule, Britannia!" and "Land of Hope and Glory" performed at the 2020 Last Night of the Proms, and both will now be performed by a "select" group of singers. |
| 2 | Olympic boxer Nicola Adams is confirmed as the first person to be paired with a same-sex dance partner on Strictly Come Dancing when the show returns for its eighteenth series in October. |
| 3 | Bryan Kirkwood announces that he will be stepping down as the executive producer of Hollyoaks, with his episodes set to run until June 2021. |
| 3 | Former Prime Minister Tony Blair appears as a guest on BBC One's Newscast. |
| 4 | Former Home Secretary Jacqui Smith is confirmed as being among the Strictly Come Dancing contestants for 2020. |
| 5 | The dance troupe Diversity perform a Black Lives Matter inspired routine on an edition of Britain's Got Talent in which dancer Ashley Banjo is seen being knelt on by a police officer, a reference to the murder of George Floyd. Within two days Ofcom says it has received 1,121 complaints about the routine, and is deciding whether to launch an investigation into breach of broadcasting rules. |
| 7 | The first episodes of EastEnders and Hollyoaks to be filmed since the recommencing of production are broadcast. |
| 7 | ITV announce that series 10 of Doc Martin will end in 2021. |
| 10 | The number of complaints to Ofcom regarding Diversity's Black Lives Matter inspired dance routing on Britain's Got Talent reaches 10,267; ITV says the performance highlighted "important topics of conversation" and "was compiled for a family audience". |
| 11 | Donald Fear wins the million pound jackpot on Who Wants to Be a Millionaire?, becoming the first to do so since Ingram Wilcox in 2006. |
| 12 | The BBC confirms that the Strictly Come Dancing special from Blackpool Tower Ballroom will be cancelled in 2020 due to the Coronavirus pandemic, the first time since Series 10 that there has been no Blackpool special. It instead plans to hold a "celebration" of Blackpool during one of its live show weeks. |
| 12 | The shortened 2020 Proms season concludes, with a reduced BBC Symphony Orchestra playing to an empty Royal Albert Hall. |
| 13 | A Question of Sport presenter Sue Barker announces she is leaving the BBC One quiz show after 24 years, as part of a major shake-up at the programme that will also see team captains Matt Dawson and Phil Tufnell depart after the next series. |
| 14 | Emmerdale and Coronation Street return to transmitting six weekly episodes. |
| 15 | The BBC publishes its list of its highest earning presenters, as it is revealed that Match of the Day presenter Gary Lineker has taken a 23% pay cut. |
| 16 | Jake Wood announces his departure from EastEnders after fifteen years in the role of Max Branning. His final scenes have been described as an "explosive exit", but the character would not be killed off. |
| 17 | Sky Arts launches on Freeview and Freesat, thereby becoming a free-to-air channel. |
| 17 | Ofcom says it would launch an investigation into Diversity's Black Lives Matter inspired dance routine on Britain's Got Talent as some broadcasting regulations may have been breached. A total of 24,500 complaints were received about the routine. |
| 25 | Andrew Neil announces he will leave the BBC after 25 years to take up the position of chair of GB News, launching next year. Neil's final appearance on the BBC will be in November to present coverage of the US Presidential election. |
| 26 | Debut of Little Mix The Search on BBC One, a reality show to find a supporting act for girl band Little Mix on their upcoming tour. Overnight viewing figures indicate the show to have been watched by 1.9m viewers (an 11.6% audience share) for the first episode. The second episode the following day is seen by 1.8m (an 11.3% share). |
| 28 | The final edition of BBC Cymru Wales's flagship news programme, Wales Today, is broadcast from its Llandaff studios shortly after 9am, and the first edition is aired from Central Square at lunchtime. |
| 28 | BBC One airs the documentary Freddie Flintoff: Living with Bulimia in which cricketer Freddie Flintoff talks about his battle with bulimia. |
| 28 | The BBC announces that the Halloween special of Strictly Come Dancing will not take place this year, citing the delayed start to this year's series as the reason. It also confirms that celebrities in the upcoming series will be automatically eliminated if they test positive for Coronavirus. |
| 29 | BBC Director-General Tim Davie says he would be prepared to fire any presenters who breach impartiality guidelines on social media, or to order them to close their social media accounts. |
| 30 | Chat show presenter Graham Norton questions the need for same-sex dance partners on Strictly Come Dancing, saying that judges will not be able to compare like with like. |

=== October ===
| Date | Event |
|---|---|
| 1 | Disney XD, Disney Channel and Disney Junior all cease their broadcasts. The channels close after exactly 25 years on air due to Disney failing to reach a new carriage deal with Sky and Virgin Media. The channels' contents are transferred to Disney+. |
| 1 | The Welsh Government gives its permission for filming of I'm a Celebrity...Get Me Out of Here! to go ahead, despite Conwy, the area where the reality show is taking place, being subject to a local lockdown. |
| 1 | Coming to England, Floella Benjamin's account of arriving in the UK from Trinidad as a ten-year-old, is read as a CBeebies Bedtime Story by historian David Olusoga to celebrate the start of Black History Month. |
| 2 | YouTube star and Strictly Come Dancing contestant HRVY tests positive for Coronavirus, but is still expected to take part in the programme. |
| 3 | Sky Arts airs an episode of Sky Atlantic's The Third Day, shown live over 12 hours in one continuous shot. |
| 8 | Strictly Come Dancing's 2021 live arena tour is postponed until 2022 because of Coronavirus. |
| 9 | Channel 4 names Davina McCall as presenter of a forthcoming reboot of Changing Rooms. |
| 10 | Among those from the world of television to be recognised in the 2020 Birthday Honours are Mary Berry and Maureen Lipman, who both receive Damehoods, and Phil Redmond and David Suchet, who are knighted. |
| 10 | Jon Courtenay wins series fourteen of Britain's Got Talent, becoming the first act in the show's history to win having received a Golden Buzzer in his audition. |
| 13 | BBC Two airs the documentary Rob Burrow: My Year with MND about the rugby league player Rob Burrow's life since his diagnosis with Motor Neurone Disease, the film having been postponed from its scheduled broadcast the previous day because of a televised government press conference on the Coronavirus pandemic. |
| 13 | Gemma Collins: Diva Forever & Ever, the latest instalment of Gemma Collins' reality franchise Diva begins airing on ITVBe. Filming for the series originally commenced in February 2020, However, in March, Collins announced that filming had been paused due to the Coronavirus pandemic. As a result, ITVBe commissioned a spin-off series filmed in Collins' home, Diva on Lockdown that aired in April instead. |
| 14 | Due to "a small number" of production members working on Little Mix The Search testing positive for Coronavirus, the first live episode is postponed to 24 October. |
| 16 | Luisa Bradshaw-White announces that she will be quitting her role as Tina Carter in EastEnders after seven years. |
| 17 | Nicola Adams makes Strictly Come Dancing history by becoming the first celebrity to perform in a same-sex pairing after being partnered with professional dancer Katya Jones. |
| 21 | The BBC announce that two production members on EastEnders have tested positive for Coronavirus, but confirm that filming would be disrupted. |
| 21 | ITV announce that a one-off part one of a two part Spitting Image 2020 US Election special will return on 31 October for the first time on ITV in almost 25 years. Parts one and two will also be available to stream on BritBox. |
| 21 | Hollyoaks celebrates its 25th anniversary with a special episode two days prior to the anniversary date, due to not transmitting episodes on Fridays, due to the impact of the pandemic on filming. The episode features the returns of Kurt Benson (Jeremy Edwards) and Silas Blissett (Jeff Rawle), and every regular cast member is featured in the episode. |
| 21 | Sky History pulls its series The Chop, Britain's Best Woodworker, a contest for carpenters, over concerns about one of its contestant's tattoos, which is of the number 88, which he says represents his son's birth year, 1988. The series is cancelled the following week after an investigation determines the tattoo "could be connected to far-right ideologies" because it is used by neo-Nazis to represent heil Hitler. |
| 24 | The first live episode of this year's Strictly Come Dancing gets under way with a tribute to frontline NHS staff. |
| 26 | Ofcom rejects more than 3,000 complaints about comedian Nabil Abdulrashid's routines on Britain's Got Talent that covered the topics of race and religion, and got him to the final. |
| 26 | BBC One launches a "topical live series" that airs at 9:15 am on weekdays. Called Morning Live, airing on weekdays at 9.15am, the programme is designed to connect with viewers' real-life concerns and to offer trustworthy and expert advice. Morning Live was initially commissioned to run for 40 episodes, until Christmas, but soon became a permanent part of BBC One's morning schedule. |
| 27 | The BBC removes a trailer for the documentary The Trials of Oscar Pistorius following complaints that it did not mention the former athlete's murder victim, Reeva Steenkamp. |
| 27 | Television presenter Victoria Derbyshire apologises after saying she would break Coronavirus regulations to spend Christmas with her family. |
| 28 | Channel 4 announces plans to repay £1.5m in furlough payments to the government after finding itself in a "robust financial position ahead of expectations". |

=== November ===
| Date | Event |
|---|---|
| 2 | Doctors returns to transmission following their extended summer break. |
| 2 | The BBC announces that the second series of RuPaul's Drag Race UK, which was scheduled to air in 2020, will instead be transmitted in early 2021, and a third series will follow in the autumn of 2021. Production was suspended earlier in the year because of the pandemic. |
| 3 | Lime Pictures announce that Lucy Allan is returning as the executive producer of Hollyoaks, following Bryan Kirkwood's decision to depart from the role. Allan is also appointed the head of continuing drama at Lime Pictures. |
| 3 | Earl Spencer, the brother of Diana, Princess of Wales, demands a BBC inquiry into claims faked bank statements helped to secure his sister's 1995 Panorama interview with Martin Bashir. |
| 3 | Following the announcement of increased lockdown restrictions in England from 5 November, the BBC announces that it is suspending the use of studio audiences from its programmes until at least the following month. It confirms Strictly Come Dancing will be held behind closed doors whilst other shows such as Have I Got News For You and The Graham Norton Show will use a virtual audience of people watching from home. |
| 5 | BBC Two airs Being Frank: The Frank Gardner Story, a documentary in which the BBC's security correspondent, Frank Gardner, discusses his disability that was caused after he and his cameraman were ambushed and shot by al-Qaeda terrorists in Saudi Arabia. |
| 7 | The Royal British Legion Festival of Remembrance takes place at the Royal Albert Hall. Due to the Coronavirus lockdown, it is pre-recorded as opposed to being shown live and held behind closed doors with all performers observing social distancing. |
| 7 | The BBC promises an inquiry into claims Panorama reporter Martin Bashir made a number of false and defamatory claims about senior royals at the time of the 1995 Diana, Princess of Wales interview if evidence is presented. |
| 7 | Sky Sports announces the Scotland and Northern Ireland Euro 2020 play-off finals will be made free-to-air on UK television. |
| 10 | In a Telegraph article, Culture Secretary Oliver Dowden says the time has come to "ask really profound questions" about the role of public service broadcasters such as the BBC and Channel 4 in the digital age, "and indeed whether we need them at all". |
| 10 | Holby City airs its first new episode since it restarted production, beginning with a special episode that reflects the hospital battling the Coronavirus pandemic. |
| 10 | Laura Shaw, the producer of ITV's Emmerdale, defends a forthcoming storyline in which a couple decide to terminate a pregnancy after learning their child has Down's syndrome, saying it has been carefully researched and urging people to watch it. The storyline has attracted criticism from some viewers that it is further stigmatising the condition. |
| 11 | The Equalities and Human Rights Commission clears the BBC of unlawful acts of pay discrimination against women following an investigation. |
| 12 | Former boxer Nicola Adams exits series 18 of Strictly Come Dancing after dance partner Katya Jones tests positive for Coronavirus. |
| 13 | BBC One airs Children in Need 2020, which is staged without a live audience, and is shorter than usual. By the end of the programme £37m has been raised. |
| 13 | The BBC confirms that Anton du Beke will join the judging panel on Strictly Come Dancing for the upcoming weekend after regular panellist Motsi Mabuse announces she is self-isolating following a trip to Germany. |
| 14 | It is reported that Eamonn Holmes and Ruth Langsford have been axed from their weekly This Morning presenting roles in favour of Alison Hammond and Dermot O'Leary. |
| 15 | Series 20 of I'm a Celebrity...Get Me Out of Here! begins, held this year at Gwrych Castle in North Wales because of Coronavirus travel restrictions. |
| 17 | Dawn French is to reprise her role as The Vicar of Dibley for three 10-minute episodes over Christmas. The episodes, inspired by lockdown and the Coronavirus crisis, will air following repeats of old episodes. |
| 17 | ITV have defended I'm A Celebrity... Get Me Out of Here!' amid concerns over animal welfare. The RSPCA says it was "really disappointed" to learn the programme's bushtucker trials would take place in the usual manner, but ITV says the trials comply with animal welfare. |
| 18 | The BBC announces the terms of an inquiry headed by former Supreme Court judge Lord Dyson into the events surrounding Martin Bashir's 1995 Panorama interview with Diana, Princess of Wales. |
| 19 | ITV's Loose Women is rebranded as Loose Men to mark International Men's Day, and has an all male panel made up of Marvin Humes from boy band JLS, singer and presenter Ronan Keating, radio presenter Roman Kemp and Love Island narrator Iain Stirling. |
| 20 | At an inquest into the death of a man who appeared on ITV's The Jeremy Kyle Show, the presiding coroner says that presenter Jeremy Kyle "may have caused or contributed" to the death. |
| 22 | Sarah Horsley, the widow of Hugh Lindsay, the British Army officer killed in an avalanche while skiing with Prince Charles at Klosters in 1988, tells the Sunday Telegraph of her distress at seeing the incident dramatised in the latest series of The Crown, and that she had asked Netflix not to dramatise it. |
| 24 | Peter Sawkins wins series 11 of The Great British Bake Off, becoming the youngest contestant to win the series, aged 20. |
| 25 | Ofcom has revealed that satisfaction with the BBC among older and more affluent people (typically their most loyal audience) is starting to wane for the first time. |
| 25 | Ofcom releases its annual diversity report into the socio-economic background of employees in the radio and television industry, and concludes that it remains poorly understood, although the industry is collecting more information than a year ago. |
| 26 | The BBC announces that an episode of Live at the Apollo in which comedian Jack Whitehall told a joke about attending a pop concert with a friend who is a dwarf will not be rebroadcast following complaints by two viewers. |
| 27 | Strictly Come Dancing judge Bruno Tonioli will miss being at this year's final in person, as he is unable to fly back to the UK from his US home amid Coronavirus concerns. |
| 28 | Producers of Coronation Street say they have had to "strip away some of the stunts" planned for the show's 60th anniversary because of Coronavirus, and instead focus on character-led storylines, three of which reach their conclusion in the week of its birthday. |
| 29 | Culture Secretary Oliver Dowden suggests the Netflix series The Crown should carry a fiction warning because it risks generations who did not live through the era it is set in believing that it is a real portrayal of the royal family. |
| 29 | Talking Pictures TV begins showing the 1971 London Weekend Television series Upstairs, Downstairs. |
| 30 | The BBC confirms that Bradley Walsh and Tosin Cole are to make their final appearance as the Doctor's companions, Graham O'Brien and Ryan Sinclair, in the New Year's Day special of Doctor Who. |
| 30 | Andrea McLean announces on air that she will leave ITV's Loose Women at Christmas after being with the show since 2007. |

=== December ===
| Date | Event |
|---|---|
| 2 | The BBC confirms boxer Tyson Fury will remain on the 2020 BBC Sports Personality of the Year shortlist after he posted a video on social media asking to be removed from it; the BBC says the shortlist is decided by an independent panel. |
| 4 | Giovanna Fletcher wins series 20 of I'm a Celebrity...Get Me Out of Here!. |
| 7 | Jonty Claypole announces his intention to step down as BBC Director of Arts in April 2021; he has occupied the role since 2014. |
| 7–11 | Coronation Street celebrates its 60th anniversary with a week of special episodes. The week features the ending of a coercive control storyline where Yasmeen Metcalfe (Shelley King) is found guilty of the attempted murder of her abusive husband Geoff (Ian Bartholomew), which follows Geoff falling to his death from a rooftop. Other storylines featuring are the residents of Weatherfield fight with Ray Crosby (Mark Frost) over his plans to demolish most of the town, as well as the reveal of Carla Connor's (Alison King) one-night stand with her husband Peter Barlow (Chris Gascoyne)'s nephew Adam (Sam Robertson) leading to the introduction of a whodunnit storyline centred on who attacked Adam. ITV3 also airs special episodes of the soap between 10:00pm–11:05pm including: Episode 1 (Coronation Street), the tenth anniversary episode from December 1970, two episodes from the twentieth anniversary in December 1980, two episodes from the thirtieth anniversary in December 1990, the Coronation Street Live (2000 episode) from the fortieth anniversary in December 2000, and the fiftieth anniversary episode Coronation Street Live (2010 episode) which airs after a repeat of The Road to Coronation Street. |
| 8 | Ofcom has warned that public service broadcasting is unlikely to survive without a radical rethink, and suggests in future times outlets such as Netflix and Sky may produce some public service content. |
| 8 | Sky News presenter Kay Burley apologises over a breach of Coronavirus rules after using a public convenience at a different venue while celebrating her 60th birthday at a restaurant, though it is unclear whether any rules were broken. Burley, political editor Beth Rigby, north of England correspondent Inzamam Rashid and presenter Sam Washington would be taken off the air on 9 December after Sky began conducting an investigation over alleged breaches of regulations. On 10 December, Sky announced that Burley would be suspended from the network for six months; Rigby and Rashid received three-month suspensions. |
| 9 | Gemma Collins stars in Gemma Collins: Diva for Xmas, a Christmas special of her reality series Gemma Collins: Diva. The episode oversees the recording of Collins' charity single "Baby, It's Cold Outside" alongside former Celebrity Big Brother co-star Darren Day and at the end of the special, the music video for the song is premiered. The special transpires to be the final episode of the franchise. |
| 10 | Two new series are announced for ITV: Three Little Birds, a series written by Lenny Henry based on his mother's experience of moving to the UK from Jamaica in the 1950s, and a new version of The Darling Buds of May titled The Larkins, starring Bradley Walsh and Joanna Scanlan. |
| 11 | Following the death of Barbara Windsor the previous day, BBC One makes changes to its Friday evening schedule to air the 2017 Windsor biopic Babs. |
| 17 | Doctors transmits their final episode before their annual Christmas break, with the usual two-week break extended until February 2021. |
| 18 | Ofcom publishes a set of guidelines for television channels concerning the welfare of people who appear on their programmes following a rise in complaints about the impact of shows on the mental health of those taking part in them. |
| 19 | Comedian Bill Bailey and professional dance partner Oti Mabuse win series 18 of Strictly Come Dancing. Bailey becomes the oldest person to win the series. |
| 20 | Formula One world champion Lewis Hamilton wins the 2020 BBC Sports Personality of the Year Award. |
| 24 | The BBC have received 266 complaints from viewers about an episode of The Vicar of Dibley aired the previous week which contained a scene that made reference to the Black Lives Matter movement. |
| 25 | Channel 4's Alternative Christmas message is delivered by a deepfake version of Queen Elizabeth II, airing at the same time as the real Queen's message is being broadcast. The programme, which Channel 4 says is meant to be a warning against fake news, attracts controversy and complaints from viewers. Commentators describe some of the content, which includes jokes about the prime minister and toilets, as well as a depiction of the Queen doing a dance routine for TikTok, as "disrespectful" and in "poor taste". Ofcom subsequently confirms it has received 214 complaints about the programme and is considering whether to launch an investigation. |
| 26 | Overnight viewing figures for Christmas Day indicate the Queen's Christmas Message to be the most watched television programme on 25 December, with a collective audience of 8.14 million viewers. The 2020 Christmas special of Call the Midwife on BBC One is second with 5.43 million viewers, and Blankety Blank is third with 5.26 million. |
| 30 | Among those from the world of television to be recognised in the 2021 New Year Honours are Sheila Hancock, who becomes a Dame, and Nina Wadia, who is awarded an OBE. |
| 31 | Sky News reports that Sir Paul Marshall, a prominent hedge fund manager, is in talks to invest £10 million into GB News. |
| 31 | BBC One airs Alicia Keys Rocks New Year's Eve to see in 2021, as well as the fireworks display from London. This year's display includes a light show created by 300 drones that pays tribute to NHS staff and notable figures of 2020. Overnight figures indicate the display is watched by 10.75 million viewers. |

== Debuts ==
=== BBC ===
| Date | Debut | Channel |
|---|---|---|
| 1 January | Dracula | BBC One |
| 1 January | Earth's Tropical Islands | BBC Two |
| 1 January | Veganville | BBC Three |
| 4 January | First and Last | BBC One |
| 9 January | Baby Chimp Rescue | BBC Two |
| 15 January | Good Omens | BBC Two |
| 21 January | Chris Packham: 7.7 Billion People and Counting | BBC Two |
| 25 January | Shrill | BBC Three |
| 27 January | Crime: Are We Tough Enough? | BBC One |
| 27 January | Great Asian Railway Journeys | BBC Two |
| 27 January | Love Monster | CBeebies |
| 27 January | The Windermere Children | BBC Two |
| 28 January | Young, Sikh and Proud | BBC One |
| 30 January | Life Cinematic | BBC Four |
| 2 February | Art on the BBC | BBC Four |
| 3 February | Shock of the Nude with Mary Beard | BBC Two |
| 4 February | Life Drawing Live! | BBC Four |
| 9 February | The Pale Horse | BBC One |
| 14 February | Get Even | BBC Three |
| 5 March | Noughts + Crosses | BBC One |
| 10 March | Five Bedrooms | BBC One |
| 15 March | Trigonometry | BBC Two |
| 17 March | Cops Like Us | BBC Two |
| 22 March | The Nest | BBC One |
| 25 March | Mister Winner | BBC Two |
| 23 April | The Big Night In | BBC One |
| 26 April | Primates | BBC One |
| 26 April | Normal People | BBC Three |
| 18 May | Monkman & Seagull's Genius Adventures | BBC Two |
| 28 May | Football, Prince William and Our Mental Health | BBC One |
| 28 May | The First Team | BBC Two |
| 31 May | Angels of the North | BBC Three |
| 1 June | Comedians: Home Alone | BBC Two |
| 5 June | The Other One | BBC One |
| 6 June | Peter Crouch: Save Our Summer | BBC One |
| 8 June | The Bidding Room | BBC One |
| 8 June | I May Destroy You | BBC One |
| 10 June | Staged | BBC One |
| 11 June | You Are What You Wear | BBC One |
| 14 June | The Salisbury Poisonings | BBC One |
| 15 June | Your Money and Your Life | BBC One |
| 15 June | The Heights | BBC One |
| 15 June | Art of Persia | BBC Four |
| 17 June | Make Me Famous | BBC Three |
| 21 June | The Luminaries | BBC One |
| 22 June | EastEnders: Secrets from the Square | BBC One |
| 10 July | Jack Whitehall's Sporting Nation | BBC One |
| 14 July | Mystic | CBBC |
| 14 July | The Rise of the Murdoch Dynasty | BBC Two |
| 26 July | A Suitable Boy | BBC One |
| 27 July | Anthony | BBC One |
| 6 August | Semi-Detached | BBC Two |
| 14 August | Mandy | BBC Two |
| 17 August | BBC News with Katty and Christian | BBC News Channel |
| 17 August | Call That Hard Work? | BBC One |
| 18 August | Manctopia: Billion Pound Property Boom | BBC Two |
| 23 August | Harry Hill's World of TV | BBC Two |
| 31 August | The Diagnosis Detectives | BBC Two |
| 6 September | Louis Theroux: Life on the Edge | BBC Two |
| 7 September | Sue Perkins: Along the US-Mexico Border | BBC One |
| 20 September | Us | BBC One |
| 24 September | The Grand Party Hotel | BBC One |
| 26 September | Little Mix The Search | BBC One |
| 29 September | Life | BBC One |
| 4 October | Michael Palin: Travels of a Lifetime | BBC Two |
| 5 October | In the Face of Terror | BBC Two |
| 11 October | Enslaved with Samuel L. Jackson | BBC Two |
| 15 October | The Trump Show | BBC Two |
| 18 October | Roadkill | BBC One |
| 20 October | Out of Her Mind | BBC Two |
| 26 October | Morning Live | BBC One |
| 2 November | Itch | CBBC |
| 2 November | The Children Act | BBC Two |
| 2 November | CripTales | BBC Four |
| 8 November | Cornwall with Simon Reeve | BBC Two |
| 8 November | The Trials of Oscar Pistorius | BBC Two |
| 9 November | Nigella's Cook, Eat, Repeat | BBC Two |
| 10 November | Industry | BBC Two |
| 11 November | 12 Puppies and Us | BBC Two |
| 12 November | Saving Britain's Pubs with Tom Kerridge | BBC Two |
| 15 November | Small Axe | BBC One |
| 20 November | God Shave the Queens | BBC One |
| 22 November | We Are Who We Are | BBC Three |
| 28 November | Michael McIntyre's The Wheel | BBC One |
| 3 December | New Elizabethans with Andrew Marr | BBC Two |
| 4 December | Waterhole: Africa's Animal Oasis | BBC Two |
| 4 December | The Sound of TV with Neil Brand | BBC Four |
| 25 December | Zog and the Flying Doctors | BBC One |
| 27 December | Black Narcissus | BBC One |
| 27 December | Last Woman on Earth with Sara Pascoe | BBC Two |

=== ITV ===
| Date | Debut | Channel |
|---|---|---|
| 4 January | The Masked Singer | ITV |
| 8 January | White House Farm | ITV |
| 19 February | Harry Redknapp's Sandbanks Summer | ITV |
| 24 February | Flesh and Blood | ITV |
| 1 March | McDonald & Dodds | ITV |
| 4 March | The Trouble with Maggie Cole | ITV |
| 15 March | Belgravia | ITV |
| 18 March | Kate & Koji | ITV |
| 13 April | Quiz | ITV |
| 26 April | Gemma Collins: Diva on Lockdown | ITVBe |
| 26 April | Van der Valk | ITV |
| 27 April | Beat the Chasers | ITV |
| 4 May | Isolation Stories | ITV |
| 18 May | Harry's Heroes: Euro Having a Laugh | ITV |
| 30 May | Alan Carr's Epic Gameshow | ITV |
| 14 June | Martin & Roman's Sunday Best! | ITV |
| 28 July | Joanna Lumley's Unseen Adventures | ITV |
| 8 August | Rolling In It | ITV |
| 10 August | Unsaid Stories | ITV |
| 5 September | Ainsley's Food We Love | ITV |
| 6 September | All Around Britain | ITV |
| 6 September | Love Your Weekend with Alan Titchmarsh | ITV |
| 7 September | Inside Animal A&E | ITV |
| 13 September | The Singapore Grip | ITV |
| 14 September | Des | ITV |
| 15 September | Harbour Cops | ITV |
| 23 September | Celebrity Karaoke Club | ITV2 |
| 24 September | London Zoo: An Extraordinary Year | ITV |
| 28 September | Honour | ITV |
| 12 October | John Bishop's Great Whale Rescue | ITV |
| 26 October | The Sister | ITV |
| 2 November | Don't Unleash the Beast | CITV |
| 2 November | Dont Rock the Boat | ITV |
| 4 November | The Emily Atack Show | ITV2 |
| 11 November | Paul O'Grady's Great British Escape | ITV |
| 16 November | Winning Combination | ITV |
| 30 November | Love Bites | ITV2 |
| 1 December | For the Love of Britain | ITV |

=== Channel 4 ===
| Date | Debut | Channel |
|---|---|---|
| 8 January | Meat the Family | Channel 4 |
| 10 January | Deadwater Fell | Channel 4 |
| 21 January | Crazy Delicious | Channel 4 |
| 3 February | Baghdad Central | Channel 4 |
| 19 February | Jon Snow's Very Hard Questions | More4 |
| 10 March | Five Guys a Week | Channel 4 |
| 29 March | Hollyoaks Favourites | E4 |
| 30 March | The Steph Show | Channel 4 |
| 26 April | Reasons to Be Cheerful with Matt Lucas | Channel 4 |
| 18 May | Work on the Wild Side | Channel 4 |
| 14 June | Big Brother: Best Shows Ever | E4 |
| 25 June | The School That Tried to End Racism | Channel 4 |
| 26 June | Celebrity Snoop Dogs | Channel 4 |
| 21 July | The Real Eastenders | Channel 4 |
| 27 July | Hollyoaks@25 | E4 |
| 16 August | Derren Brown: 20 Years of Mind Control | Channel 4 |
| 27 August | Location, Location, Location: 20 Years and Counting | Channel 4 |
| 14 September | Steph's Packed Lunch | Channel 4 |
| 5 October | Adult Material | Channel 4 |
| 11 October | The Bridge | Channel 4 |
| 29 October | Maxxx | Channel 4 |
| 5 December | Lost Kingdoms of the Amazon | Channel 4 |
| 14 December | Chef vs Corner Shop | Channel 4 |
| 25 December | Clown | Channel 4 |

=== Channel 5 ===
| Date | Debut | Channel |
|---|---|---|
| 22 March | How to Deep Clean Your Home | Channel 5 |
| 22 March | Filthy Family Swap | Channel 5 |
| 22 March | Most Shocking Celebrity Fallouts | Channel 5 |
| 13 July | Shoplifters: At War with the Law | Channel 5 |
| 1 September | All Creatures Great and Small | Channel 5 |
| 9 October | Friday on the Farm | Channel 5 |

=== Other channels ===
| Date | Debut | Channel |
|---|---|---|
| 3 January | James May: Our Man in... | Amazon Prime Video |
| 30 January | The Stranger | Netflix |
| 27 February | Meet the Richardsons | Dave |
| 4 March | Sandylands | Gold |
| 20 March | The English Game | Netflix |
| 20 March | The Letter for the King | Netflix |
| 31 March | Miss Scarlet and The Duke | Alibi |
| 20 April | It's Pony | Nicktoons |
| 28 April | The Architecture the Railways Built | Yesterday |
| 1 May | Trying | Apple TV+ |
| 15 May | White Lines | Netflix |
| 18 May | The Big Flower Fight | Netflix |
| 4 June | Alex Rider | Amazon Prime Video |
| 13 June | Doubt (Al Shak) | Shahid, MBC Group, MBC4 |
| 4 August | Little Birds | Sky Atlantic |
| 27 August | I Hate Suzie | Sky Atlantic |
| 31 August | All or Nothing: Tottenham Hotspur | Amazon Prime Video |
| 2 September | Two Weeks to Live | Sky One |
| 11 September | The Duchess | Netflix |
| 15 September | The Third Day | Sky Atlantic |
| 5 October | Guessable | Comedy Central |
| 30 October | Truth Seekers | Amazon Prime Video |
| 13 November | James May: Oh Cook | Amazon Prime Video |
| 8 December | Fixer | Shahid, MBC Group, MBC4 |
| 16 December | The Ripper | Netflix |
| 23 December | Jack & the Beanstalk: After Ever After | Sky One |
| 24 December | Roald & Beatrix: The Tail of the Curious Mouse | Sky One |

== Channels and streaming services ==
=== New channels ===
| Date | Channel |
|---|---|
| 27 January | Sky Comedy |
| 27 May | Sky Documentaries |
| 27 May | Sky Nature |
| 23 July | Sky Cinema Animation |
| 29 July | Merit |

=== New streaming services ===
| Date | Channel |
|---|---|
| 24 March | Disney+ |
| 12 November | Discovery+ |

=== Defunct channels ===
| Date | Channel |
|---|---|
| 7 January | 5Spike |
| 7 January | VH1 |
| 9 January | Box Upfront |
| 24 January | ITV Box Office |
| 27 January | Universal TV |
| 30 April | Disney XD +1 |
| 1 June | Challenge +1 |
| 1 June | Geo Kahani |
| 1 June | Trace Latina |
| 1 June | Starz TV |
| 9 June | Sony Crime Channel |
| 20 July | Club MTV |
| 20 July | MTV Rocks |
| 20 July | MTV OMG |
| 23 July | Sky Cinema Premiere +1 |
| 27 August | Travel Channel |
| 17 September | Merit |
| 1 October | Disney XD |
| 1 October | Disney Channel |
| 1 October | Disney Channel +1 |
| 1 October | Disney Junior |
| 1 October | Disney Junior +1 |
| 31 December | Sky Cinema Disney |

=== Rebranding channels ===
| Date | Old Name | New Name |
|---|---|---|
| 21 January | Home | HGTV |
| 2 April | UTV | UTV/ITV (temporary measure during the Coronavirus pandemic) |
| 27 May | History | Sky History |
| 27 May | History +1 | Sky History +1 |
| 27 May | History2 | Sky History 2 |
| 27 August | Sky Two | Sky Replay |
| 3 September | Sky Sports Action | Sky Sports NFL (temporary measure during the 2020 and future NFL seasons) |

== Television programmes ==
=== Changes of network affiliation ===
| Programme | Moved from | Moved to |
|---|---|---|
| Taskmaster | Dave | Channel 4 |
| The Great British Sewing Bee | BBC Two | BBC One |
| Top Gear | BBC Two | BBC One |
| The Simpsons (UK streaming rights) | Channel 4, Sky One | Disney+ |
| Agents of S.H.I.E.L.D. | E4 | Disney+ |
| Fresh Off the Boat (First run rights) | 5Star | Comedy Central |
| WWE | Sky Sports | BT Sport |
| 30 Rock | Comedy Central | Sky Comedy |
| Insecure | Sky Atlantic | Sky Comedy |
| The Trip | Sky Atlantic | Sky One |
| The Twilight Zone | Syfy | Sky One |
| Future Man | Syfy | Amazon Prime |
| The Dukes of Hazzard | Bravo | Forces TV |
| All Creatures Great and Small | BBC One | Channel 5 |
| Supermarket Sweep | ITV2 | ITV |

=== Returning this year after a break of one year or longer ===
| Programme | Date(s) of original removal | Original channel(s) | Date of return | New channel(s) |
|---|---|---|---|---|
| Crackerjack! | 21 December 1984 | BBC TV/BBC One | 17 January 2020 | CBBC |
| She-Ra: Princess of Power | 30 March 1989 | ITV | 1 February 2020 | CBBC (as She-Ra and the Princesses of Power) |
| Ant & Dec's Saturday Night Takeaway | 21 March 2009; 7 April 2018 | ITV | 22 February 2020 | N/A (same channel as original) |
| Ready Steady Cook | 2 February 2010 | BBC Two | 2 March 2020 | BBC One |
| Liar | 16 October 2017 | ITV | 2 March 2020 | N/A (same channel as original) |
| Our Girl | 24 July 2018 | BBC One | 24 March 2020 | N/A (same channel as original) |
| Paddington Station 24/7 | 27 December 2018 | Channel 5 | 14 May 2020 | |
| Gameshow Marathon | 29 October 2005; 26 May 2007 | ITV | 30 May 2020 | N/A (same channel as original, as Alan Carr's Epic Gameshow) |
| BBC Cricket | 1939; 20 June 1999 | BBC One; BBC Two | June/July 2020 | N/A (same channel as original) |
| Total Wipeout | 31 December 2012 | BBC One | 8 August 2020 | N/A (same channel as original, as Total Wipeout: Freddie and Paddy Takeover) |
| All Creatures Great and Small | 24 December 1990 | BBC One | 1 September 2020 | Channel 5 |
| Family Fortunes | 30 December 2002; 14 June 2015 (as All Star Family Fortunes) | ITV | 20 September 2020 | N/A (same channel as original) |
| Spitting Image | 18 February 1996 | ITV | 3 October 2020 | BritBox |
| The Cube | 8 August 2015 | ITV | 17 October 2020 | N/A (same channel as original, as The Million Pound Cube) |
| Hollyoaks Does Come Dine with Me | 23 October 2015 | E4 | 19 October 2020 | N/A (same channel as original) |
| Birds of a Feather | 18 December 2017 | ITV | 24 December 2020 | N/A (same channel as original) |

== Continuing television programmes ==
=== 1950s ===
| Programme | Date |
|---|---|
| Panorama | 1953–present |
| The Sky at Night | 1957–present |
| Final Score | 1958–present (part of Grandstand, 1958–2001) |
| Blue Peter | 1958–present |

=== 1960s ===
| Programme | Date |
|---|---|
| Coronation Street | 1960–present |
| Points of View | 1961–present |
| Songs of Praise | 1961–present |
| University Challenge | 1962–1987, 1994–present |
| Doctor Who | 1963–1989, 1996, 2005–present |
| Horizon | 1964–present |
| Match of the Day | 1964–present |
| Top of the Pops | 1964–present (only at Christmas since 2006) |
| Gardeners' World | 1968–present |
| A Question of Sport | 1968, 1970–present |

=== 1970s ===
| Programme | Date |
|---|---|
| Emmerdale | 1972–present |
| Mastermind (including Celebrity Mastermind) | 1972–1997, 2003–present |
| Newsround | 1972–present |
| Football Focus | 1974–present |
| Arena | 1975–present |
| One Man and His Dog | 1976–2020 |
| Top Gear | 1977–present |
| Ski Sunday | 1978–present |
| Antiques Roadshow | 1979–present |
| Question Time | 1979–present |

=== 1980s ===
| Programme | Date |
|---|---|
| Children in Need | 1980–present |
| Countdown | 1982–present |
| ITV Breakfast | 1983–present |
| Spitting Image | 1984–1996, 2020–2021 |
| Thomas & Friends | 1984–2021 |
| EastEnders | 1985–present |
| Watchdog | 1985–present |
| Comic Relief | 1985–present |
| Catchphrase | 1986–2002, 2013–present |
| Casualty | 1986–present |
| Red Dwarf | 1988–1999, 2009, 2012–present |
| This Morning | 1988–present |
| Countryfile | 1988–present |

=== 1990s ===
| Programme | Date |
|---|---|
| The Crystal Maze | 1990–1995, 2016–present |
| Have I Got News for You | 1990–present |
| MasterChef | 1990–2001, 2005–present |
| ITV News Meridian | 1993–present |
| Top of the Pops 2 | 1994–present |
| Hollyoaks | 1995–present |
| Soccer AM | 1995–present |
| Silent Witness | 1996–present |
| Midsomer Murders | 1997–present |
| Teletubbies | 1997–2001, 2007–2009, 2015–present |
| Y Clwb Rygbi | 1997–present |
| Cold Feet | 1998–2003, 2016–2020 |
| Classic Emmerdale | 1998–2004, 2019–present |
| Who Wants to Be a Millionaire? | 1998–2014, 2018–present |
| Holby City | 1999–2022 |
| Loose Women | 1999–present |

=== 2000s ===
| Programme | Date |
2000
| Bargain Hunt | 2000–present |
| BBC Breakfast | 2000–present |
| Click | 2000–present |
| Doctors | 2000–present |
| A Place in the Sun | 2000–present |
| The Unforgettable | 2000–2002, 2010–present |
| Unreported World | 2000–present |
2001
| BBC South East Today | 2001–present |
| Rogue Traders | 2001–present (part of Watchdog 2009–2020) |
2002
| Escape to the Country | 2002–2009, 2013–2018, 2020–present |
Ant & Dec's Saturday Night Takeaway
| (2002–present) | I'm a Celebrity...Get Me Out of Here! |
| (2002–present) | Inside Out |
| Most Haunted | 2002–2010, 2014–present |
| River City | 2002–2026 |
| Saturday Kitchen | 2002–present |
2003
| QI | 2003–present |
| Eggheads | 2003–present |
| Extraordinary People | 2003–present |
| Homes Under the Hammer | 2003–present |
| Traffic Cops | 2003–present |
2004
| Match of the Day 2 | 2004–present |
| Strictly Come Dancing | 2004–present |
| The Big Fat Quiz of the Year | 2004–present |
| The Culture Show | 2004–present |
| Football First | 2004–present |
| The Gadget Show | 2004–present |
| Live at the Apollo | 2004–present |
| NewsWatch | 2004–present |
| Strictly Come Dancing: It Takes Two | 2004–present |
| Who Do You Think You Are? | 2004–present |
2005
| 8 Out of 10 Cats | 2005–present |
| Coach Trip | 2005–2006, 2009–present |
| The Andrew Marr Show | 2005–present |
| The Adventure Show | 2005–present |
| Dragons' Den | 2005–present |
| The Hotel Inspector | 2005–present |
| Mock the Week | 2005–present |
| Pocoyo | 2005–present |
| Springwatch | 2005–present |
2006
| The Album Chart Show | 2006–present |
| Animal Spies! | 2006–present |
| The Apprentice: You're Fired! | 2006–present |
| Banged Up Abroad | 2006–present |
| Cricket AM | 2006–present |
| Dancing on Ice | 2006–2014, 2018–present |
| Dickinson's Real Deal | 2006–present |
| Don't Get Done, Get Dom | 2006–present |
| Monkey Life | 2006–present |
| Not Going Out | 2006–present |
| The One Show | 2006–present |
| People & Power | 2006–present |
| Peschardt's People | 2006–present |
| The Secret Millionaire | 2006–2008, 2010–present |
2007
| Britain's Got Talent | 2007–present |
| Would I Lie to You? | 2007–present |
| The Big Questions | 2007–present |
| Don't Tell the Bride | 2007–present |
| The Graham Norton Show | 2007–present |
| Heir Hunters | 2007–present |
| Helicopter Heroes | 2007–present |
| London Ink | 2007–present |
| Shaun the Sheep | 2007–present |
| Real Rescues | 2007–present |
| The Hot Desk | 2007–present |
| 2008 | 2007–present |
| An Là | 2008–present |
| Big & Small | 2008–present |
| Celebrity Juice | 2008–present |
| Chuggington | 2008–present |
| Only Connect | 2008–present |
| Put Your Money Where Your Mouth Is | 2008–present |
| Police Interceptors | 2008–present |
| Rubbernecker | 2008–present |
| Seachd Là | 2008–present |
2009
| Pointless | 2009–present |
| The Chase | 2009–present |
| Alan Carr: Chatty Man | 2009–present |
| Countrywise | 2009–present |
| Cowboy Trap | 2009–present |
| Piers Morgan's Life Stories | 2009–present |
| Rip Off Britain | 2009–present |

=== 2010s ===
| Programme | Date |
2010
| Dinner Date | 2010–present |
| The Great British Bake Off | 2010–present |
| Great British Railway Journeys | 2010–present |
| A League of Their Own | 2010–present |
| Little Crackers | 2010–present |
| Lorraine | 2010–present |
| Luther | 2010–present |
| The Only Way Is Essex | 2010–present |
| Sherlock | 2010–present |
| Sunday Morning Live | 2010–present |
2011
| All Over the Place | 2011–present |
| Black Mirror | 2011–present |
| Four Rooms | 2011–present |
| Junior Bake Off | 2011–present |
| Made in Chelsea | 2011–present |
| Match of the Day Kickabout | 2011–present |
| Sam & Mark's Big Friday Wind-Up | 2011–present |
| Show Me What You're Made Of | 2011–present |
| 24 Hours in A&E | 2011–present |
| Top Boy | 2011–2013, 2019–2023 |
| Vera | 2011–2025 |
2012
| 4 O'Clock Club | 2012–2020 |
| Endeavour | 2012–2023 |
| Call the Midwife | 2012–present |
| Great Continental Railway Journeys | 2012–present |
| Stand Up To Cancer | 2012–present |
| The Voice UK | 2012–present |
| Tipping Point | 2012–present |
| Paul O'Grady: For the Love of Dogs | 2012–2023 |
| Operation Ouch! | 2012–present |
| Claimed and Shamed | 2012–present |
2013
| The Dog Rescuers | 2013–2021 |
| The Dumping Ground | 2013–present |
| Our Girl | 2013–2020 |
| Shetland | 2013–present |
| Still Open All Hours | 2013–2019 |
| Two Doors Down | 2013, 2016–present |
2014
| Agatha Raisin | 2014–present |
| The Dog Ate My Homework | 2014–present |
| GPs: Behind Closed Doors | 2014–present |
| The Great British Bake Off: An Extra Slice | 2014–present |
| Happy Valley | 2014–present |
| In the Club | 2014–present |
| Judge Rinder | 2014–present |
| Grantchester | 2014–present |
| The Next Step | 2014–present |
| Scrambled! | 2014–present |
| Who's Doing the Dishes? | 2014–present |
| 24 Hours in Police Custody | 2014–present |
2015
| The Dengineers | 2015–present |
| Doctor Foster | 2015–present |
| Eat Well for Less? | 2015–present |
| Hetty Feather | 2015–2020 |
| Hollyoaks Does Come Dine with Me | 2015, 2020 |
| The Last Kingdom | 2015–2022 |
| Hunted | 2015–present |
| Michael McIntyre's Big Show | 2015–present |
| Ninja Warrior UK | 2015–present |
| Nightmare Tenants, Slum Landlords | 2015–present |
| Safe House | 2015–present |
| SAS: Who Dares Wins | 2015–present |
| So Awkward | 2015–present |
| Taskmaster | 2015–present |
| Thunderbirds Are Go | 2015–2020 |
| Victoria Derbyshire | 2015–2020 |
| 10,000 BC | 2015–present |
2016
| The A Word | 2016–present |
| Bake Off: The Professionals | 2016–present |
| Celebs Go Dating | 2016–present |
| Class Dismissed | 2016–2017, 2019–present |
| The Crown | 2016–present |
| The Cruise | 2016–present |
| Got What It Takes? | 2016–present |
| The Level | 2016–present |
| Marcella | 2016–present |
| Masterpiece | 2016–present |
| Naked Attraction | 2016–present |
| No Such Thing as the News | 2016–present |
| The Premier League Show | 2016–present |
| Tenable | 2016–present |
| Top Class | 2016–present |
| The Windsors | 2016–present |
2017
| Ackley Bridge | 2017–present |
| All Round to Mrs. Brown's | 2017–present |
| Back | 2017–present |
| Bancroft | 2017–present |
| Beyond 100 Days | 2017–present |
| This Country | 2017–2020 |
| The Good Karma Hospital | 2017–present |
| The Voice Kids | 2017–present |
| Impossible | 2017–present |
| Liar | 2017–2020 |
| Love Island: Aftersun | 2017–present |
| The Mash Report | 2017–2020 |
| The Playlist | 2017–present |
| The Repair Shop | 2017–present |
| Richard Osman's House of Games | 2017–present |
| Riviera | 2017–present |
| Strike | 2017–present |
| Reported Missing | 2017–present |
2018
| Britannia | 2018–present |
| Bulletproof | 2018–present |
| The Circle | 2018–present |
| Defending the Guilty | 2018–present |
| Derry Girls | 2018–present |
| A Discovery of Witches | 2018–present |
| Gemma Collins: Diva | 2018–2020 |
| I'll Get This | 2018–2020 |
| In My Skin | 2018–2021 |
| Killing Eve | 2018–2020, 2022 |
| Mark Kermode's Secrets of Cinema | 2018–present |
| Peston | 2018–present |
| Shakespeare & Hathaway: Private Investigators | 2018–2020, 2022 |
| The Split | 2018, 2020, 2022 |
| There She Goes | 2018–2020 |
2019
| Almost Never | 2019–2021 |
| The Andrew Neil Show | 2019–2020 |
| The Greatest Dancer | 2019–2020 |
| After Life | 2019–2020, 2022 |
| Glow Up: Britain's Next Make-Up Star | 2019–present |
| The Hit List | 2019–present |
| Ladhood | 2019–2022 |
| Mandy | 2019–present |
| Sex Education | 2019–2021, 2023–present |
| War on Plastic with Hugh and Anita | 2019–2020 |

== Ending this year ==
| Date(s) | Programme | Channel(s) | Debut(s) |
|---|---|---|---|
| 1 January | Top Class | CBBC | 2016 |
| 3 January | Dracula | BBC One | 2020 |
| 3 January | Earth's Tropical Islands | BBC Two | 2020 |
| 9 January | The London Show | Dubai TV / Dubai One | 2019 |
| 23 January | Baby Chimp Rescue | BBC Two | 2020 |
| 26 January | The Trial of Christine Keeler | BBC One | 2019 |
| 30 January | Brexitcast | BBC One | 2019 |
| 31 January | Deadwater Fell | Channel 4 | 2020 |
| 12 February | White House Farm | ITV | 2020 |
| 16 February | The Pale Horse | BBC One | 2020 |
| 22 February | Thunderbirds Are Go | CITV | 2015 |
| 7 March | The Greatest Dancer | BBC One | 2019 |
| 11 March | The Andrew Neil Show | BBC Two | 2019 |
| 11 March | Child of Our Time | BBC One / BBC Two / BBC Four | 2000 |
| 12 March | Beyond 100 Days | BBC Four / BBC News | 2017 |
| 13 March | Sport Relief | BBC One / BBC Two | 2002 |
| 17 March | Victoria Derbyshire | BBC News; BBC Two | 2015 |
| 23 March | This Country | BBC Three | 2017 |
| 6 April | Liar | ITV | 2017 |
| 15 April | Hetty Feather | CBBC | 2015 |
| 15 April | Quiz | ITV | 2020 |
| 17 April | Strike Back | Sky One | 2010 |
| 28 April | Our Girl | BBC One | 2013 |
| 1 May | Friday Night Dinner | Channel 4 | 2011 |
| 8 May | The Mash Report | BBC Two | 2017 |
| 17 May | Primates | BBC One | 2020 |
| 20 May | Harry's Heroes: Euro Having a Laugh | ITV | 2020 |
| 16 June | The Salisbury Poisonings | BBC One | 2020 |
| 25 July | Peter Crouch: Save Our Summer | BBC One | 2020 |
| 28 July | The Rise of the Murdoch Dynasty | BBC Two | 2020 |
| 11 August | Joanna Lumley's Unseen Adventures | ITV | 2020 |
| 24 August | A Suitable Boy | BBC One | 2020 |
| 4 September | EastEnders: Secrets from the Square | BBC One | 2020 |
| 8 September | Manctopia: Billion Pound Property Boom | BBC Two | 2020 |
| 8 September | Sue Perkins: Along the US-Mexico Border | BBC One | 2020 |
| 12 September | Total Wipeout: Freddie and Paddy Takeover | BBC One | 2020 |
| 16 September | Des | ITV | 2020 |
| 29 September | Honour | ITV | 2020 |
| 7 October | Two Weeks to Live | Sky One | 2020 |
| 11 October | Us | BBC One | 2020 |
| 13 October | John Bishop's Great Whale Rescue | ITV | 2020 |
| 18 October | The Singapore Grip | ITV | 2020 |
| 19 October | In the Face of Terror | BBC Two | 2020 |
| 20 October | The Third Day | Sky Atlantic | 2020 |
| 25 October | Michael Palin: Travels of a Lifetime | BBC Two | 2020 |
| 25 October | Enslaved with Samuel L. Jackson | BBC Two | 2020 |
| 26 October | Adult Material | Channel 4 | 2020 |
| 29 October | The Trump Show | BBC Two | 2020 |
| 29 October | The Sister | ITV | 2020 |
| 8 November | Roadkill | BBC One | 2020 |
| 15 November | Cornwall with Simon Reeve | BBC Two | 2020 |
| 27 November | Go Jetters | CBeebies | 2015 |
| 29 November | The Trials of Oscar Pistorius | BBC Two | 2020 |
| 9 December | Gemma Collins: Diva | ITVBe | 2018 |
| 13 December | Small Axe | BBC One | 2020 |
| 17 December | New Elizabethans with Andrew Marr | BBC Two | 2020 |
| 18 December | Waterhole: Africa's Animal Oasis | BBC Two | 2020 |
| 18 December | The Sound of TV with Neil Brand | BBC Four | 2020 |
| 19 December | Supermarket Sweep | ITV & ITV2 | 1993, 2007 & 2019 |
| 24 December | Birds of a Feather | ITV | 1989 & 2014 |
| 24 December | Tin Star | Sky Atlantic | 2017 |
| 29 December | Black Narcissus | BBC One | 2020 |

== Deaths ==
| Date | Name | Age | Broadcast credibility |
|---|---|---|---|
| 3 January | Derek Acorah | 69 | Television medium and psychic (Most Haunted, Derek Acorah's Ghost Towns) |
| 3 January | Christopher Beeny | 78 | Actor (Upstairs, Downstairs, In Loving Memory, Last of the Summer Wine) |
| 12 January | Tony Garnett | 83 | Television and film producer (Kes, Earth Girls Are Easy, Cathy Come Home) |
| 17 January | Derek Fowlds | 82 | Actor (Yes Minister, The Basil Brush Show, Heartbeat) |
| 18 January | Peter Hobday | 82 | News presenter (Today, Newsnight, World at One) |
| 21 January | Terry Jones | 77 | Actor, writer, comedian and film director (Monty Python, Ripping Yarns) |
| 28 January | Nicholas Parsons | 96 | Actor and presenter (Sale of the Century, Just a Minute) |
| 31 January | Andrée Melly | 87 | Actress (The Brides of Dracula) |
| 1 February | Charles Wood | 87 | Screenwriter (The Knack ...and How to Get It, Help!, Iris) |
| 6 February | Raphaël Coleman | 25 | Actor (Nanny McPhee, It's Alive, The Fourth Kind) |
| 14 February | John Shrapnel | 77 | Actor (Nicholas and Alexandra, England, My England, 101 Dalmatians, Bodyguards, Gladiator, Troy, Elizabeth: The Golden Age) |
| 15 February | Caroline Flack | 40 | Television presenter (TMi, The X Factor, Strictly Come Dancing, Love Island) |
| 16 February | Pearl Carr | 98 | Singer (Pearl Carr & Teddy Johnson) and UK Eurovision contestant (1959) |
| 16 February | Frances Cuka | 83 | Actress (Scrooge, Casualty, Friday Night Dinner) |
| 19 February | Heather Couper | 70 | Astronomer and broadcaster (The Sky at Night) |
| 26 February | Michael Medwin | 96 | Actor (Shoestring, Scrooge, The Army Game) |
| 27 February | Natasha Reddican | 31 | Television producer (The Jeremy Kyle Show) |
| 15 March | Roy Hudd | 83 | Actor (Coronation Street, The Blood Beast Terror, Up the Chastity Belt, The Alf Garnett Saga) |
| 23 March | David Collings | 79 | Actor (Scrooge, The Thirty Nine Steps, The Invisible Woman) |
| 2 April | Ron Graham | 93 | Actor (Home and Away, Waterloo Station) |
| 2 April | Eddie Large | 78 | Comedian (Little and Large) |
| 4 April | Jay Benedict | 68 | Actor (Emmerdale, Foyle's War) |
| 5 April | Honor Blackman | 94 | Actress (The Avengers, Goldfinger, Jason and the Argonauts, The Upper Hand) |
| 12 April | Tim Brooke-Taylor | 79 | Actor (The Goodies, At Last The 1948 Show, One Foot in the Grave) |
| 15 April | Sean Arnold | 79 | Actor (Grange Hill, Bergerac) |
| 24 April | Lynn Faulds Wood | 72 | Television presenter (Breakfast Time, Watchdog, World in Action) and journalist |
| 28 April | Jill Gascoine | 83 | Actress (The Gentle Touch, C.A.T.S. Eyes, The Onedin Line) |
| 5 May | June Bernicoff | 82 | Reality show participant (Gogglebox) |
| 12 May | George Mikell | 91 | Actor (Kill Her Gently, The Guns of Navarone, The Great Escape) |
| 22 May | Heather Chasen | 92 | Actress (Crossroads, EastEnders, Les Misérables) |
| 26 May | Tony Scannell | 74 | Actor (The Bill) |
| 30 May | Michael Angelis | 76 | Actor (Boys from the Black Stuff, G.B.H., Thomas & Friends, Auf Wiedersehen, Pet, The Liver Birds) |
| 16 June | John Benfield | 68 | Actor (Prime Suspect, Speed Racer, Cassandra's Dream) |
| 19 June | Sir Ian Holm | 88 | Actor (Alien, Chariots of Fire, The Lord of The Rings) |
| 23 June | Margarita Pracatan | 89 | Singer (The Clive James Show) |
| 28 June | Julian Curry | 82 | Actor (Rumpole of the Bailey, Sky Captain and the World of Tomorrow, Escape to Victory) |
| 28 June | Louis Mahoney | 81 | Actor (Omen III: The Final Conflict, Doctor Who, Captain Phillips) |
| 3 July | Earl Cameron | 102 | Actor (Doctor Who, Pool of London, The Interpreter) |
| 9 July | Johnny Beattie | 93 | Actor (River City) (Scotch & Wry, Rab C. Nesbitt) |
| 15 July | Maurice Roëves | 83 | Actor (Oh! What a Lovely War, Escape to Victory, The Last of the Mohicans) |
| 28 July | Sydney Lotterby | 93 | Director and producer (Last of the Summer Wine, Yes Minister, Open All Hours) |
| 1 August | Tony Morris | 57 | Newsreader (Granada Reports) |
| 2 August | Leslie Randall | 95 | Actor (Billy Liar, Joan and Leslie, Emmerdale) |
| 4 August | Brian Black | 70s | Television presenter on UTV |
| 18 August | Ben Cross | 72 | Actor (Chariots of Fire, Star Trek, First Knight) |
| 2 September | John Shrapnell | 85 | Television journalist, singer and actor (The Insider's Guide To Happiness) |
| 5 September | Rodney Litchfield | 81 | Actor (Early Doors, Coronation Street, Phoenix Nights) |
| 8 September | Tony Tanner | 88 | Actor and theatre director (Stop the World – I Want to Get Off, ITV Sunday Night Theatre) |
| 10 September | Dame Diana Rigg | 82 | Actress (The Avengers, On Her Majesty's Secret Service, Game of Thrones, Doctor Who) |
| 12 September | Barbara Jefford | 90 | Actress (Ulysses, Philomena, The Ninth Gate) |
| 21 September | Michael Lonsdale | 89 | Actor (The Day of the Jackal, Moonraker, The Remains of the Day) |
| 26 September | Jimmy Winston | 75 | Musician and actor (Doctor Who) |
| 28 September | Ronald Forfar | 81 | Actor (Bread) |
| 30 September | Frank Windsor | 92 | Actor (Z-Cars, Softly, Softly, EastEnders) |
| 30 September | Archie Lyndhurst | 19 | Actor (So Awkward) |
| 5 October | Margaret Nolan | 76 | Actress (Goldfinger, Carry On at Your Convenience, A Hard Day's Night) |
| 16 October | Dave Toole | 56 | Dancer and actor (Amazing Grace, Rome, The Tango Lesson) |
| 21 October | Frank Bough | 87 | Television presenter (Look North, Grandstand, BBC Breakfast Time) |
| 25 October | Johnny Leeze | 78 | Actor (Emmerdale, Coronation Street, The League of Gentlemen) |
| 28 October | Bobby Ball | 76 | Comedian (Cannon and Ball), actor (Mount Pleasant, Not Going Out) and television host |
| 31 October | Sir Sean Connery | 90 | Actor (Dr. No, The Untouchables, The Hunt for Red October) |
| 2 November | John Sessions | 67 | Actor and comedian (Stella Street, Spitting Image, Whose Line Is It Anyway?) |
| 5 November | Geoffrey Palmer | 93 | Actor (The Fall and Rise of Reginald Perrin, Butterflies, As Time Goes By, Executive Stress) |
| 7 November | John Fraser | 89 | Actor (The Good Companions, The Trials of Oscar Wilde, Repulsion) |
| 13 November | Philip Voss | 84 | Actor (Doctor Who, Fish, Vicious) |
| 14 November | Des O'Connor | 88 | Television presenter (The Des O'Connor Show, Des O'Connor Tonight, Take Your Pick!, Countdown), comedian and singer |
| 28 November | David Prowse | 85 | Bodybuilder, weightlifter and actor (Star Wars, A Clockwork Orange, Jabberwocky) |
| 1 December | Hugh Keays-Byrne | 73 | Actor (Mad Max, Stone, Rush, Sleeping Beauty, Mad Max: Fury Road) and film director |
| 4 December | Neville Wanless | 89 | Broadcaster (ITV Tyne Tees) |
| 5 December | Peter Alliss | 89 | Golfer, commentator and television presenter |
| 10 December | Dame Barbara Windsor | 83 | Actress (Carry On films, The Rag Trade, EastEnders) |
| 17 December | Jeremy Bulloch | 75 | Actor (Star Wars, The Spy Who Loved Me, Mary, Queen of Scots) |
| 19 December | Rosalind Knight | 87 | Actress (Carry On films, Tom Jones, Gimme Gimme Gimme, Friday Night Dinner, The Crown) |
| 19 December | Eileen Pollock | 73 | Actress (Bread) |
| 23 December | Kay Purcell | 57 | Actress (Emmerdale, Tracy Beaker Returns, Waterloo Road) |
| 25 December | Martin Lambie-Nairn | 75 | Graphic designer who gained fame for developing the logo of Channel 4 (1982) and a series of idents for the BBC Television networks between 1991 and 2007 |
| 28 December | Adele Rose | 87 | Television writer (Coronation Street, Byker Grove) |
