= Portrait of Prince William and Prince Harry =

Painting by Nicky Philipps

- Artist: Nicky Philipps
- Completion date: 2009
- Medium: Oil on canvas
- Dimensions: 137.4 cm × 147.5 cm (54.1 in × 58.1 in)
- Location: National Portrait Gallery, London

Portrait of Prince William and Prince Harry is an oil-on-canvas painting by Nicky Philipps. It is part of the collection of the National Portrait Gallery (NPG) in London. The painting depicts Prince William and Prince Harry in conversation. It was commissioned by trustees of the NPG in 2009.

== Description ==
Sittings for the painting began in 2008 and continued into the following year. Philipps's double-portrait of the brothers was unveiled at the National Portrait Gallery in London, on 6 January 2010. The two royals are painted wearing the dress uniform of the Blues and Royals, one of the regiments of the Household Cavalry, in the setting of Clarence House, their official residence and the home of their father, the then Prince of Wales. William also wears the star and blue sash of the Order of the Garter. Above Harry's right shoulder a painting of Queen Elizabeth the Queen Mother is slightly visible and her private collection of paintings can be seen behind William. This was the first work of art that depicted the brothers together without being surrounded by other individuals.

"The first portrait of the princes captures them formally dressed, but informally posed. It is a delightful image which extends the tradition of royal portraiture," said National Portrait Gallery director Sandy Nairne at the time of the unveiling. In 2018 and to mark the 70th birthday of their father, the then Prince Charles, sketches from his personal art collection went on display, including preparatory oil sketches Philipps had produced of the princes in preparation for her portrait.

The portrait was last displayed at the gallery between March and August 2018 and then became part of the touring exhibition, Tudors to Windsors, which travelled between 2018 and 2021. In June 2023, it was reported that following the gallery's refurbishment and reopening the painting had been removed from public display, which some commentators linked to the reported rift between the brothers following Harry's decision to step back from his royal duties. The NPG and Kensington Palace stated that the decision to remove the painting was not at the request of the palace and such decisions were solely made by the gallery’s curatorial team.
