= Z333 (disambiguation) =

Z333 is the band number of Wisdom, the oldest known wild bird in the world.

Z-333 or Z 333 may also refer to:

- NORAD Cross City radar station (NORAD id: Z-333), Florida, US, part of the Joint Surveillance System
- "Of old when heroes thought it base" (1690, ode, id: Z 333), a composition by Henry Purcell; see List of compositions by Henry Purcell
