= Life Drawing Live! =

- Presented by: Josie d'Arby; Joe Lycett
- Country of origin: United Kingdom
- Original language: English

Production
- Executive producers: Emyr Afan; Sally Dixon
- Running time: 120 minutes
- Production company: Avanti Media

Original release
- Network: BBC Four; BBC Two
- Release: February 4, 2020 – present

Life Drawing Live! is a British television special which first aired on BBC Four on 4 February 2020.

The two-hour programme was broadcast live and featured a life drawing class during which experts guided a group of artists in how to create a life drawing, while viewers at home were also encouraged to participate, by creating their own work. Presented by Josie d'Arby, Life Drawing Live! was aired to coincide with the broadcast of Shock of the Nude, a series presented by Mary Beard on BBC Two. The programme was accompanied by award-winning artists Daphne Todd and Lachlan Goudie, and featured pre-recorded tips from artist Diana Ali. Details of the programme were announced on 24 December 2019.

A second two-hour programme was broadcast on BBC Four on 12 May 2020, presented once again by d'Arby and accompanied by Goudie, Ali, and Nicola Philipps. This included social distancing due to the COVID-19 pandemic.
