= Raymond Snoddy =

British journalist, television presenter and author

Matthew Raymond Snoddy OBE (born 1946) is a British journalist, television presenter, author and media commentator. He is known for his extensive career covering media and press issues for national newspapers, and as the founding presenter of the BBC's Newswatch programme (2004–2012). He was previously media editor of The Times and media correspondent at the Financial Times.

== Early life and education ==
Snoddy was born in Larne, County Antrim, Northern Ireland. He was educated at Larne Grammar School and subsequently read for a degree at Queen's University Belfast.

== Career ==
=== Print journalism ===
After university, Snoddy worked on local and regional newspapers before joining The Times in 1971. In 1978, he moved to the Financial Times, where he spent 19 years as media correspondent, reporting on media and communications issues. During his time at the Financial Times, he established himself as one of the United Kingdom's most prominent media reporters.

In 1997, Snoddy returned to The Times as media editor, a position he held until 2004. Following his departure from The Times, he became a freelance journalist, writing columns for The Independent and contributing to a range of publications.

As of 2026, Snoddy writes a regular weekly column for The Media Leader (part of Mediatel) and contributes to the British Journalism Review. He also contributes to InPublishing and chairs media industry seminars and conferences.

=== Television ===
Snoddy's television career began with occasional appearances as a guest presenter on What the Papers Say, the long-running newspaper review programme, while he was at the Financial Times.

From 1989 to 1990, he presented Hard News, a weekly Channel 4 series examining the conduct of the British press. He also presented Media Monthly on Sky News.

In 2004, following the Hutton Inquiry into the circumstances surrounding the death of David Kelly, the BBC launched Newswatch as part of an initiative to make BBC News more accountable to its audience. Snoddy was appointed its founding presenter. The programme, broadcast on the BBC News channel on Fridays and repeated during BBC Breakfast on Saturday mornings, brought viewers face to face with BBC journalists and editors to discuss editorial decisions and complaints. In October 2012, Samira Ahmed succeeded Snoddy as presenter of Newswatch.

=== Media commentary and consultancy ===
As a freelance media consultant, Snoddy regularly chairs and speaks at industry events, including the annual Society of Editors conference. He has also appeared as a panellist at events organised by the Institute for Government, discussing topics such as the future of news and impartiality in broadcasting.

He is also a contributor to books published by Bite-Sized Books, including edited volumes on the future of the BBC and the intersection of journalism and politics in a post-truth era.

== Honours ==
In the 2000 New Year Honours, Snoddy was appointed an Officer of the Order of the British Empire (OBE) for services to journalism, while serving as media editor of The Times.

== Bibliography ==
- Snoddy, Raymond (1993). The Good, the Bad and the Unacceptable: The Hard News about the British Press. Faber and Faber. ISBN 978-0-571-16153-9.
- Snoddy, Raymond (1996). Greenfinger: The Rise of Michael Green and Carlton Communications. Faber and Faber. ISBN 978-0-571-17374-7.
- Snoddy, Raymond; Ashworth, Jon (2001). It Could Be You: The Untold Story of the National Lottery. Faber and Faber. ISBN 978-0-571-20087-0.
