= Earth's Tropical Islands =

2020 British television documentary

- Genre: Nature documentary
- Narrated by: David Harewood
- Country of origin: United Kingdom
- Original language: English
- No. of episodes: 3

Production
- Executive producer: Mark Brownlow
- Producers: Sara Douglas; Will Ridgeon; Evie Wright
- Running time: 60
- Production company: BBC Natural History Unit

Original release
- Network: BBC Two
- Release: 1 January – 3 January 2020

Earth's Tropical Islands is a 2020 British television series co-produced by the BBC Natural History Unit and PBS. It premiered on 1 January 2020 in the United Kingdom on BBC Two. and later in the USA on PBS under the title, Islands of Wonder. The series has three episodes, each of which features a different tropical island.

== Episodes ==
No.	Title	Original air date	UK viewers (millions)
1	"Madagascar"	1 January 2020	1.80
Journey across Madagascar, exploring wildlife from lemurs to tiny chameleons. Briefly follows the people of Ampotaka.
2	"Borneo"	2 January 2020	1.93
A look at Borneo's shoreline, mangroves, proboscis monkey, ancient forests, frogs, and more.
3	"Hawaii"	3 January 2020	N/A
Features the waterfall-climbing fish, carnivorous caterpillar, the oldest known bird, a Laysan albatross called Wisdom, and more.
