= Samira Ahmed =

British journalist and writer

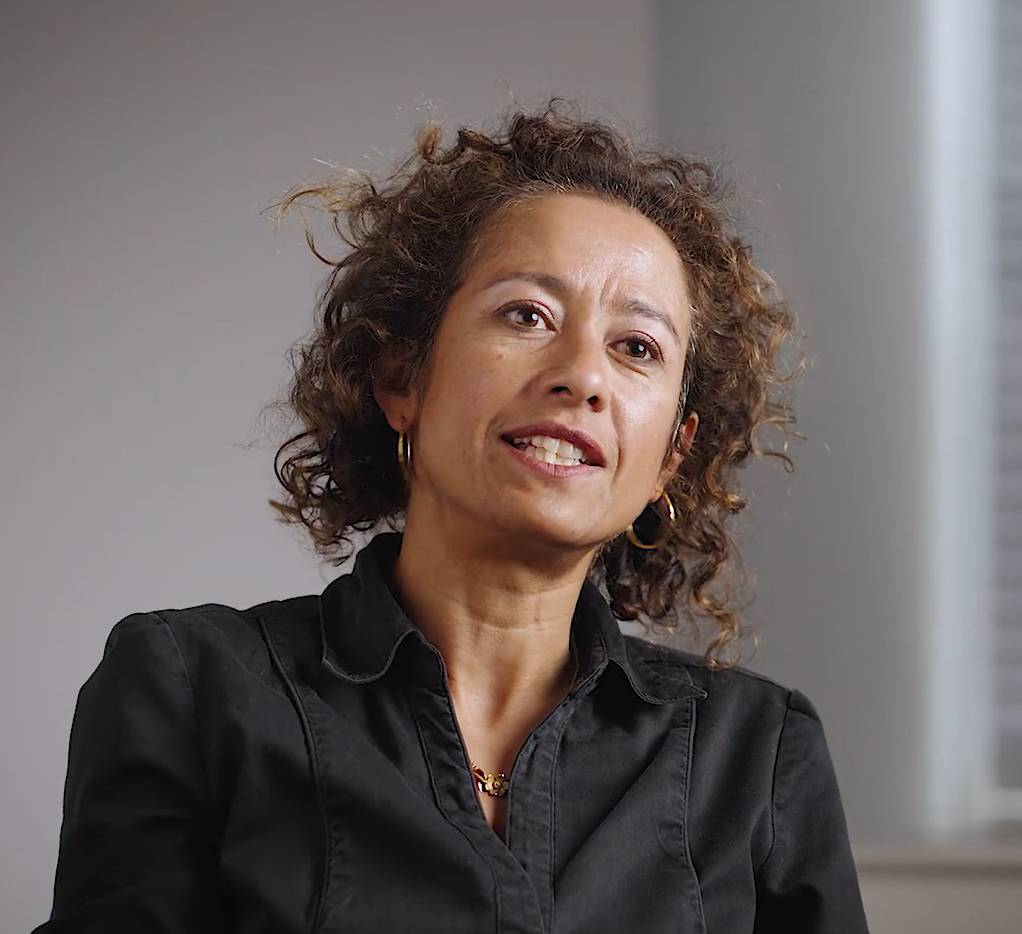
- Ahmed in 2022
- Born: 15 June 1968 (age 58); Roehampton, London, England
- Education: St Edmund Hall, Oxford; City University, London
- Occupations: Journalist, documentarian and news presenter
- Spouse: Brian Millar (divorced)
- Children: 2
- Website: www.samiraahmed.blog

Samira Ahmed (born 15 June 1968) is a British journalist, writer and broadcaster at the BBC, for which she presents Front Row on Radio 4 and Newswatch on the BBC News channel and BBC One during BBC Breakfast, and regularly presents radio documentaries. She was named British Broadcasting Press Guild audio presenter of the year in March 2020.

Her latest documentaries include Disgusted, Mary Whitehouse (March 2022) and Art of Persia (June 2020). She has presented Radio 3's Night Waves and Radio 4's PM, The World Tonight, Today and Sunday, and has presented the Proms for BBC Four. She co-presents the vintage TV podcast Through the Square Window with journalist Graham Kibble-White. She is the author of a BFI Film Classics book on the Beatles' first film A Hard Day's Night.

Ahmed's writing has appeared in several British publications, including The Guardian, The Independent and The Spectator arts blog, and she writes a regular column for New Humanist. She was a reporter and presenter on Channel 4 News from 2000 to 2011. She presented Sunday Morning Live, a topical discussion programme on BBC One, from 2012 to 2013.

== Early life ==
Ahmed was born in Queen Mary's Hospital, Roehampton, in the borough of Wandsworth, south London, to Athar and Lalita (née Chatterjee, born 1939, Lucknow) Ahmed. She grew up in Upper Norwood and later New Malden. Her mother is a TV presenter, actress, chef and writer on Indian cookery who previously worked for the Hindi service of the BBC World Service in Bush House as well as All India Radio in India. Samira attended Wimbledon High School, an independent day school for girls, and edited the school magazine.

Ahmed read English at St Edmund Hall, Oxford, which made her an honorary fellow in 2019. While an undergraduate, she edited Isis and the Union magazines, both University of Oxford student publications, and won the Philip Geddes Journalism Prize for her work on student newspapers. After graduation, she completed a postgraduate diploma in newspaper journalism at City University, London. She recalls that Lucy Mathen, the first female Asian reporter on BBC television, who worked on John Craven's Newsround, was an inspirational figure for her, as was broadcaster Shyama Perera, who was working in Fleet Street at around the same time.

== Journalism career ==
Ahmed talks with Francesca Stavrakopoulou, Giles Fraser and Adam Rutherford at Conway Hall.

Ahmed became a BBC news trainee in 1990. After two years on attachments, she began to work as a network radio reporter in 1992 on programmes such as Today. Fearful that her short BBC contract would not be renewed after a mishap in a difficult situation, Ahmed applied to, and was taken on by, BBC World for work as a presenter, which led to her becoming a reporter for Newsnight. She was the BBC's Los Angeles correspondent during 1996–1997 and filed reports on the O. J. Simpson civil trial.

Ahmed briefly worked for Deutsche Welle in Berlin as an anchor and political correspondent, but then returned for a brief spell with BBC World and as a night-shift presenter for BBC News 24 before taking maternity leave.

Ahmed joined Channel 4 News in April 2000, and became a presenter in July 2002. In June 2011, she left Channel 4, and went freelance.

In 2009, Ahmed won the "Broadcaster of the Year" category at the annual Stonewall Awards for her special report on "corrective rape" of lesbian women in South Africa. The report was made after ActionAid contacted her about their campaign against homophobic crime. She won the BBC's Celebrity Mastermind, with a specialist round on Laura Ingalls Wilder, the author of the Little House on the Prairie books, in December 2010. Again, in 2019, Ahmed won the Celebrity Mastermind Champion of Champions; she wore a Space 1999 costume.

From 2011 to 2013, she was a regular newspaper reviewer on Lorraine. From June 2012 to November 2013, she presented the third and fourth series of Sunday Morning Live on BBC One. In October 2012, Ahmed succeeded Ray Snoddy as presenter of Newswatch on the BBC News Channel.

She has been a visiting professor of journalism at Kingston University and a regular contributor to The Big Issue.

In September 2019, she interviewed Margaret Atwood about the novelist's new book The Testaments at the National Theatre, which was simulcast to more than 1,000 cinemas around the world as part of National Theatre Live.

In June 2020, BBC Four aired Art of Persia, a three-part study presented by Ahmed on the history and culture of Iran. A long‑time admirer of the Supermarionation works of Gerry Anderson and Sylvia Anderson, Ahmed voiced a character in the similarly produced Nebula-75. The character, Juliette Destiny, was also modelled to resemble the journalist. She reprised the role for a second episode in 2021.

In November 2021, Ahmed interviewed Paul McCartney and poet Paul Muldoon about their book The Lyrics: 1956 to the Present at the Royal Festival Hall. On 3 April 2023, Ahmed revealed her discovery of the earliest complete concert recording of the Beatles performing live in the UK on a special edition of Front Row on Radio 4. The tape was made by 15-year-old pupil John Bloomfield at Stowe School on 4 April 1963. She subsequently broadcast extracts on Front Row from a second Stowe tape made the same night over dinner by the tuck shop master, after his daughters contacted her about their recording.

Ahmed has championed the cultural re-assessment of morality campaigner Mary Whitehouse in 2022 after studying 30 years of her campaign diaries, and the comedy series The Goodies in 2024.

Ahmed has been awarded honorary doctorates by City, University of London, the University of East Anglia, Kingston University, and the University of Winchester

She is a trustee of the Centre for Women's Justice, a member of the blue plaques panel for Historic England, and sat from 2015 to 2025 on the advisory board for the National Science and Media Museum in Bradford.

=== Equal pay tribunal ===
Ahmed filed legal proceedings against the BBC under the Equality Act 2010 in October 2019. The London Central Employment Tribunal unanimously found in her favour on 10 January 2020. On 24 February 2020, it was announced that a settlement had been reached with the BBC, but no figure for this was made public. In a 2020 interview with The Observer, she revealed that a 1975 episode of The Goodies about newsroom sexism inspired her during the tribunal process. Her tribunal case was cited by the GDST as "leading the way on equal pay for women everywhere" when she was voted GDST Alumna of the Year 2021 by one of the largest votes ever.

== Personal life ==
Ahmed lives in New Malden. She was previously married to Brian Millar, and they have a son and a daughter. From 2023 to 2024, Ahmed was a trustee of the humanist charity Humanists UK. She is president of the Twentieth Century Society.
