= Wisdom (albatross) =

Oldest confirmed wild bird in the world

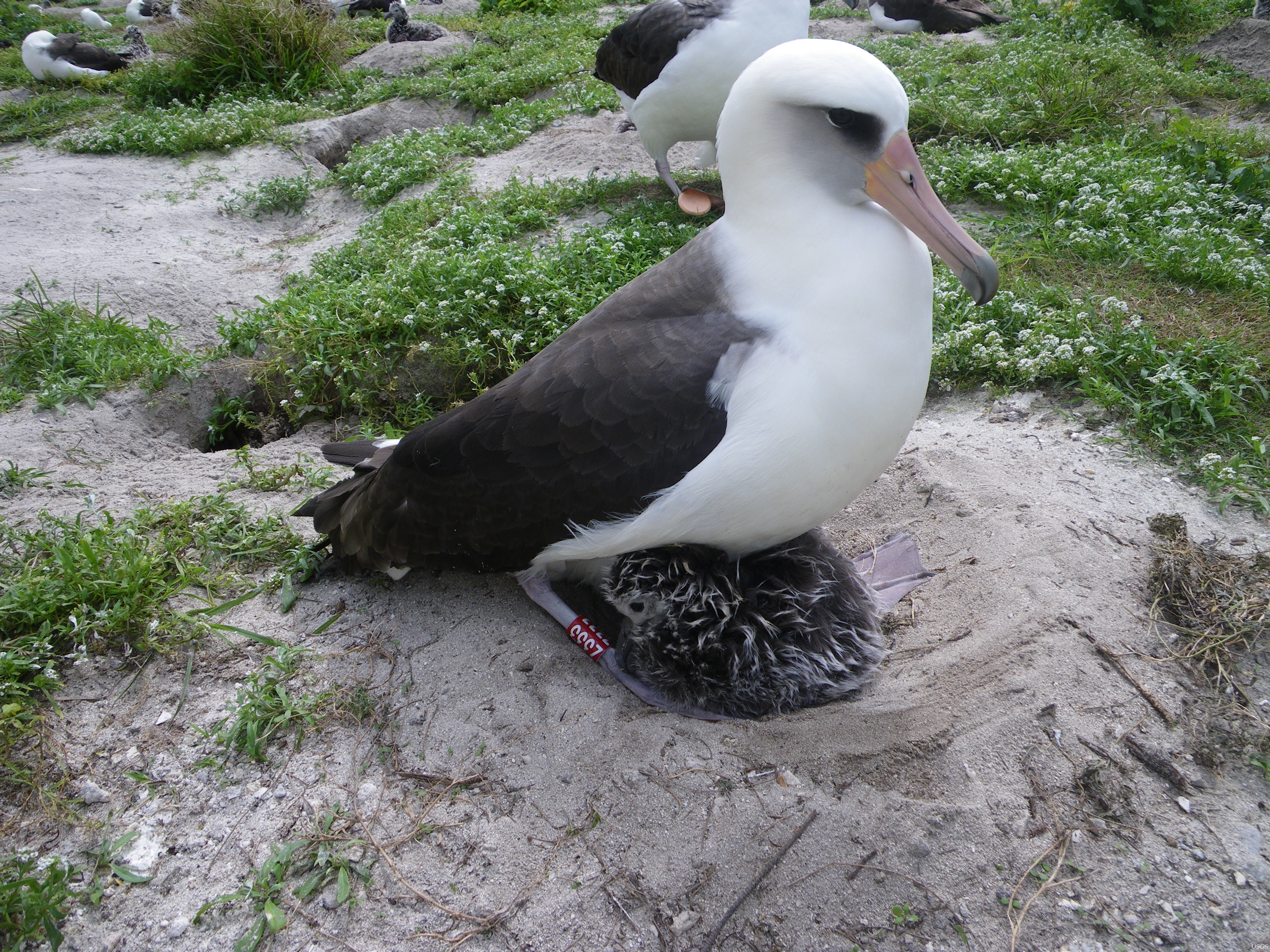
- Wisdom with one of her chicks, March 2011
- Species: Laysan albatross
- Sex: Female
- Hatched: c. 1951 (age 74–75)
- Known for: World's oldest known wild bird; world's oldest banded bird
- Mates: Akeakamai (c. 2006–2021; disappeared); EX25 (2024–present)
- Offspring: N333

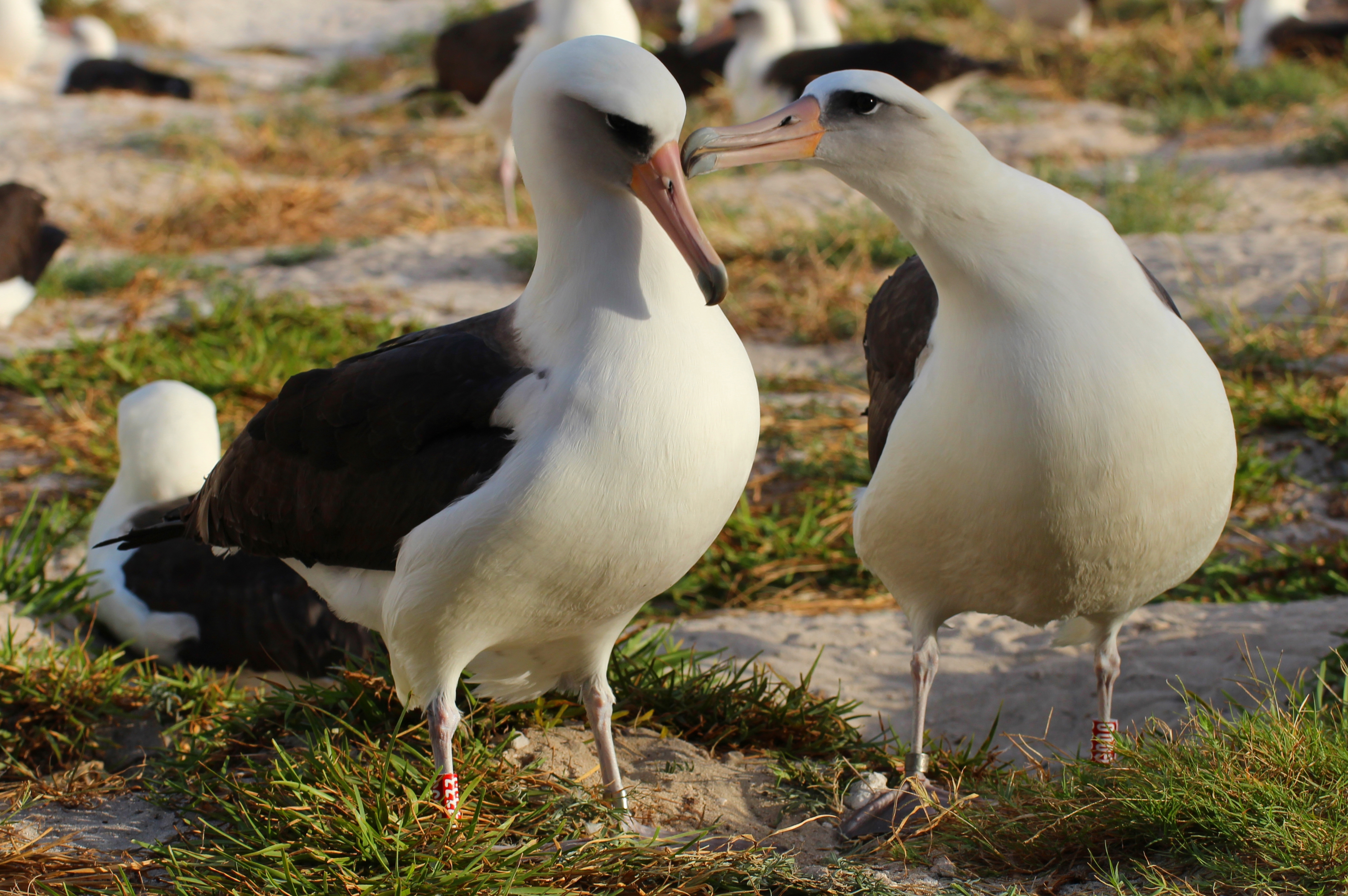
Wisdom (left) with her mate Akeakamai in 2015

Wisdom (officially designated #Z333) is a wild female Laysan albatross, the oldest confirmed wild bird in the world and the oldest banded bird in the world. First tagged in 1956 at Midway Atoll by the United States Geological Survey (USGS), she was still incubating eggs as late as 2025 and has received international media coverage in her lifetime. She was spotted alive and apparently healthy as recently as November 2025.

== Banding ==
Wisdom was first tagged in 1956 as #Z333 at the Midway Atoll National Wildlife Refuge by Chandler Robbins, a senior scientist at the USGS. At that time, she was estimated to be five years old—the earliest age that the Laysan albatross reaches sexual maturity—corresponding to a hatching date of the 1950–51 breeding season at the very latest. Birds are banded so that their populations can be monitored and individuals' longevity, behavior and migration patterns can be studied.

In 2006, John Klavitter, a United States Fish and Wildlife Service biologist at Midway, gave Wisdom her name while he was replacing her band.

The USGS has tracked Wisdom since she was first tagged and estimated that Wisdom has flown over 3,000,000 miles (4,800,000 km) since 1956 (approximately 120 times the circumference of the Earth). To accommodate her longevity, the USGS has replaced her tag six times.

== Fertility ==
Laysan Albatrosses lay one egg per year, and usually have monogamous mates for life. Smithsonian speculated that, due to Wisdom's unusual longevity, she has had to find several successive mates in order to continue breeding. Biologists estimated that Wisdom has laid some 30–40 eggs in her lifetime and that she has at least 30–36 chicks.

Between 2005 and 2014, Wisdom laid eight eggs. She and her chick survived the 2011 Tōhoku earthquake and tsunami that killed an estimated 2,000 adult Laysan and black-footed albatrosses and an estimated 110,000 chicks at the Refuge. On December 3, 2014, Wisdom made headlines when she laid an egg at Midway Atoll. Her mate had arrived at the atoll on November 19, and Wisdom was first spotted by the Refuge staff on November 22. The egg was estimated to be the 36th she had laid.

Wisdom hatched and reared another chick in December 2016 at the approximate age of 66. In December 2017, she bred again. In December 2018, United States Fish and Wildlife Service (USFWS) Pacific Region reported that Wisdom had returned to the Midway Atoll and laid an egg, which hatched in February 2019. In December 2020, it was reported that Wisdom was again incubating an egg. The chick hatched on February 1, 2021.

On November 26, 2021, Wisdom was once again seen at the atoll. Her long-time mate, Akeakamai, did not return, and she did not breed that season. However, her chick from 2011 had a chick of its own (making Wisdom "a granny"). In December 2022, it was reported that Wisdom had been spotted on Midway Atoll in the new season, but Akeakamai was still missing. On December 4, 2023, the USFWS reported that Wisdom had once again returned to Midway Atoll National Wildlife Refuge.

Wisdom continued to be spotted at Midway Atoll into 2024, being photographed there in March; at that time, Ann Bell of Friends of Midway Atoll noted that it seemed "highly unlikely" that Wisdom would be able to find another mate. However, in November 2024, Wisdom was again spotted at Midway, with a new mate - banded EX25 - and having laid an egg, being the oldest known bird to do so, at an age of at least 73. A chick hatched on January 30, 2025, and was still alive in May, but died before November 20 of the same year. Wisdom and EX25 reunited on November 26, 2025, presumably preparing to nest again.

== Impact ==
The USFWS stated, "Wisdom's continued contribution to the fragile albatross population is remarkable and important. Her health and dedication have led to the birth of other healthy offspring which will help recover albatross populations on Laysan and other islands."

Bruce Peterjohn, chief of the North American Bird Banding Program, stated that Wisdom "[was] now the oldest wild bird documented in the 90-year history of [the] USGS-FWS and Canadian bird banding program. To know that she can still successfully raise young at age 60-plus, that is beyond words."

Wisdom has received coverage from many major news sources in the United States and elsewhere, including The Guardian, National Geographic, Discovery News, 60 Minutes, and The New York Times. In January 2020, Wisdom was featured in episode 3, "Hawaii", of BBC Two's Earth's Tropical Islands.

== See also ==
- List of individual birds
