= BBC Newswatch =

Television series

- Created by: BBC News
- Presented by: Raymond Snoddy (2004–2012); Samira Ahmed (2012–present)
- Country of origin: United Kingdom
- Original language: English

Production
- Production locations: Studio L, Broadcasting House, London
- Editor: Rob Burley
- Running time: 10 minutes

Original release
- Network: BBC News (UK feed)/ BBC One
- Release: 1 October 2004 – present

BBC Newswatch is a weekly BBC television programme presented by Samira Ahmed that provides a viewer and listener right-of-reply for BBC News. The programme was originally made in studio TC7 at BBC Television Centre; however, in January 2013, the programme moved to Broadcasting House in central London.

== About ==
BBC Newswatch was launched in 2004 in response to the Hutton Inquiry, as part of an initiative to make BBC News more accountable. The programme is broadcast on Saturdays at 7:45 am on BBC One during BBC Breakfast, and on the UK feed of BBC News channel on Saturdays at 3:45 pm, or viewed online.

== Format ==
BBC Newswatch starts with the presenter introducing the main news story that viewers have complained about. After about six minutes, often including talking to the head of BBC News or someone responsible for the story, the next section of the programme is usually split between a few other news stories.

== Presenters ==
Ray Snoddy was the original presenter of the programme from 2004 to 2012.

Since October 2012, Samira Ahmed has been the presenter of the programme.

Shaun Ley guest presented the programme for three episodes in April 2019; Rebecca Jones guest presented two editions of the programme in June 2019.

== See also ==
- Feedback, a similar programme for BBC radio
- Points of View
