= Art of Persia (TV series) =

2020 BBC documentary series

- Genre: Documentary
- Directed by: Richard Downes
- Presented by: Samira Ahmed
- Country of origin: United Kingdom
- Original language: English
- No. of seasons: 1
- No. of episodes: 3

Production
- Executive producer: Matthew Springford
- Producer: Richard Downes
- Production location: Iran

Original release
- Network: BBC Four
- Release: 15 June – 29 June 2020

Art of Persia is a three-part 2020 BBC documentary series about the history and culture of Iran. The series is presented by Samira Ahmed.
