= The Rise of the Murdoch Dynasty =

2020 British documentary TV series

- Genre: Documentary
- Directed by: Jamie Roberts
- Narrated by: Kate Fleetwood
- Country of origin: United Kingdom
- Original language: English
- No. of seasons: 1
- No. of episodes: 3

Production
- Producer: Owen Phillips
- Production company: 72 Films

Original release
- Network: BBC Two

The Rise of the Murdoch Dynasty is a three-part documentary series broadcast on BBC Two in 2020. Parallels have been drawn between it and the American series Succession. It is about the business magnate Rupert Murdoch and his political influence, the News International phone hacking scandal and his children's battles to succeed him.

== Participants ==
The documentary has a cast that includes the British politicians Nigel Farage, Michael Heseltine, John Prescott and Tom Watson, the journalists Piers Morgan, Andrew Neil, Peter Oborne, Alan Rusbridger and David Yelland, the strategists Steve Bannon and Alastair Campbell, as well as Hugh Grant, Alan Sugar and former president of the Fédération Internationale de l'Automobile (FIA) Max Mosley.

== Episodes ==
No. in series	Title	Directed by	Original release date	UK viewers (millions)
1	"Kingmaker"	Jamie Roberts	14 July 2020	N/A
2	"The Rebel Alliance"	Jamie Roberts	21 July 2020	N/A
3	"The Comeback"	Jamie Roberts	28 July 2020	N/A

== Reception ==
In The Guardian, Tim Dowling opined that "While this political drama is no less gripping for being so familiar, it also feels strangely remote. On the one hand, it is hard to believe these events happened as long as a decade ago; on the other, it is difficult to recall the mood of a time when phone hacking was all we had to worry about".
