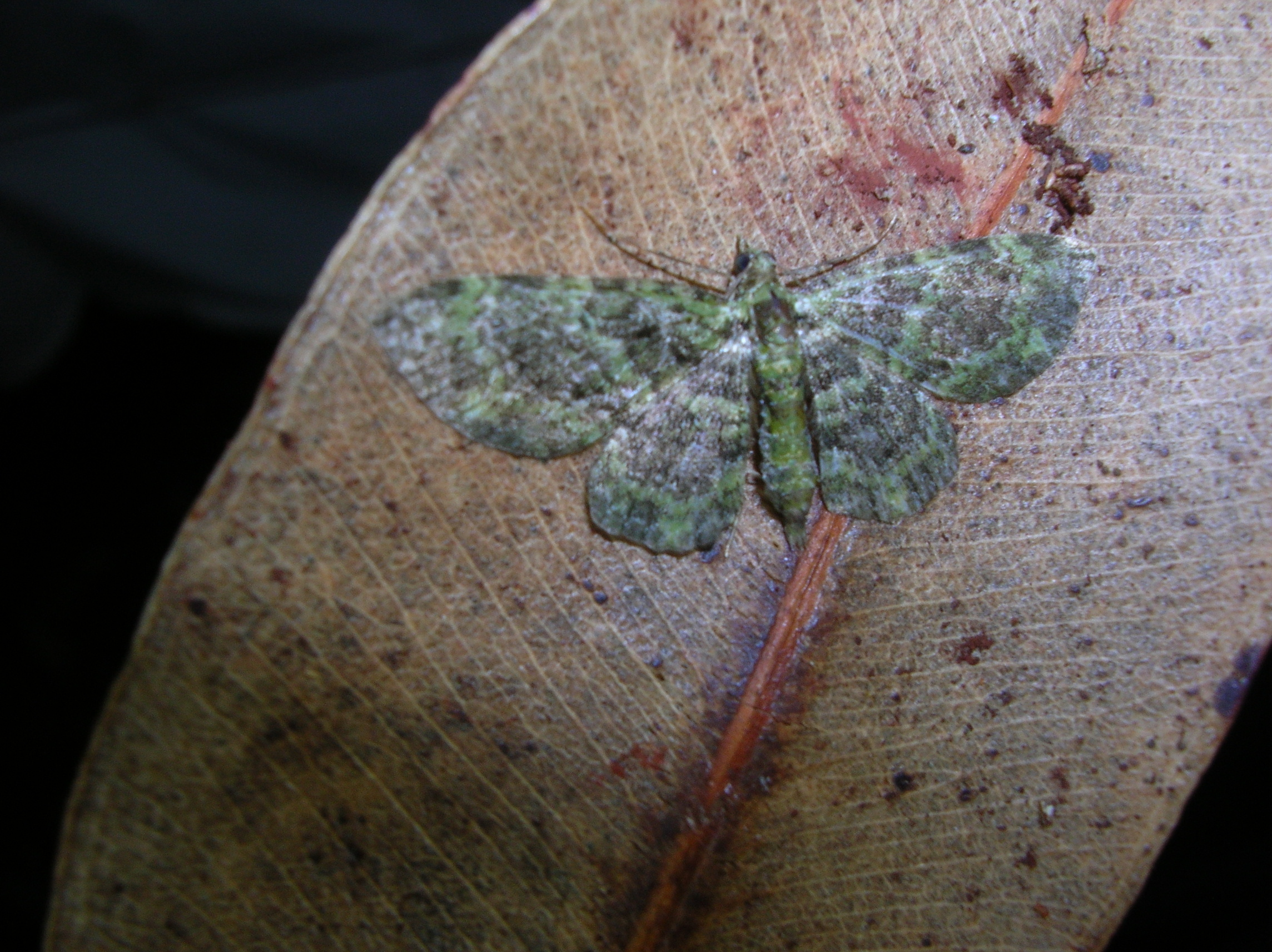

Scientific classification
- Kingdom: Animalia
- Phylum: Arthropoda
- Class: Insecta
- Order: Lepidoptera
- Family: Geometridae
- Genus: Eupithecia
- Species: E. orichloris

Binomial name
- Eupithecia orichloris (Meyrick, 1899)

Synonyms
- Eucymatoge orichloris Meyrick, 1899

= Eupithecia orichloris =

Species of moth

Eupithecia orichloris is a species of moth that is native to Kauai, Oahu, Maui, Lanai and Hawaii.

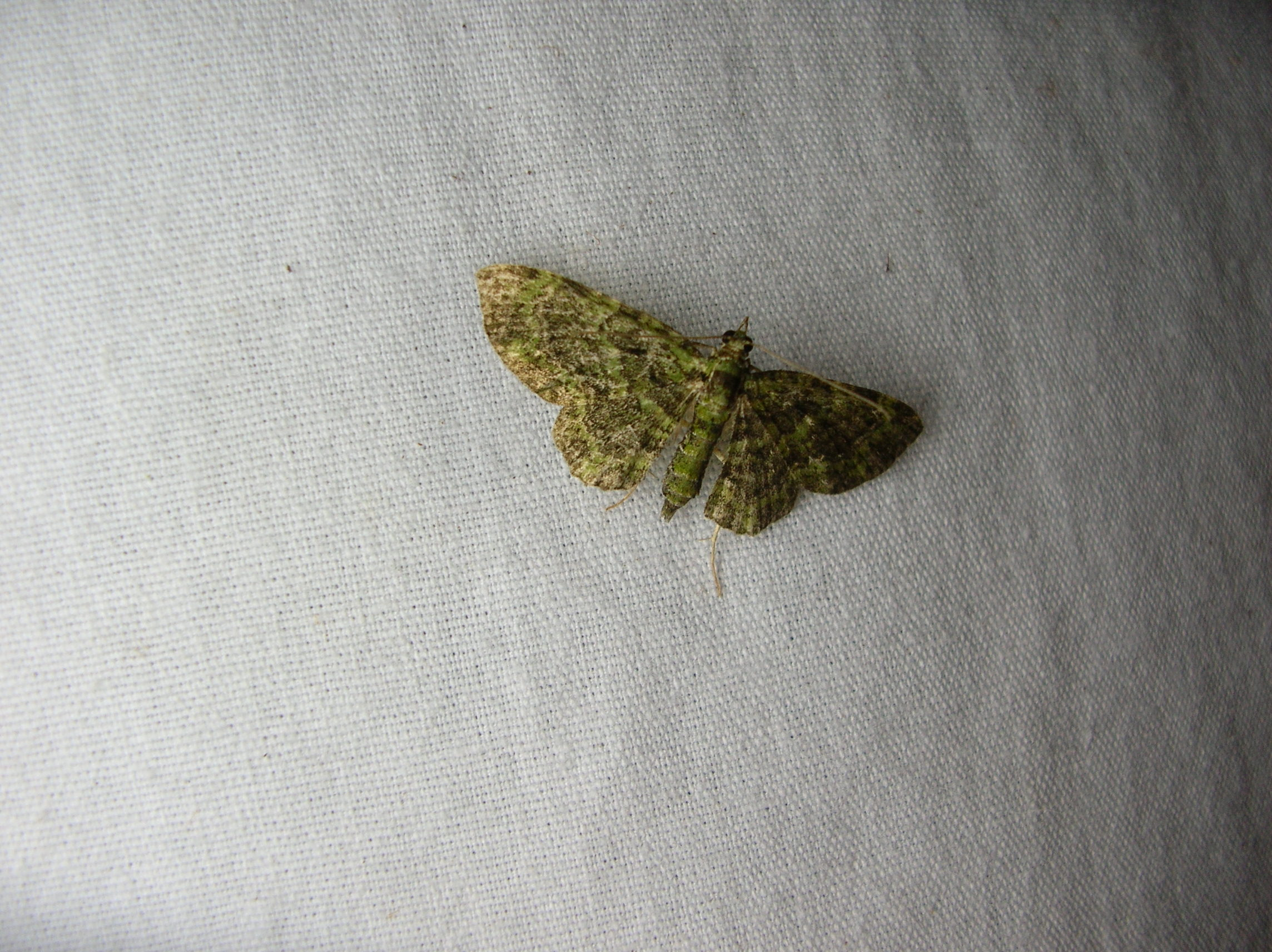

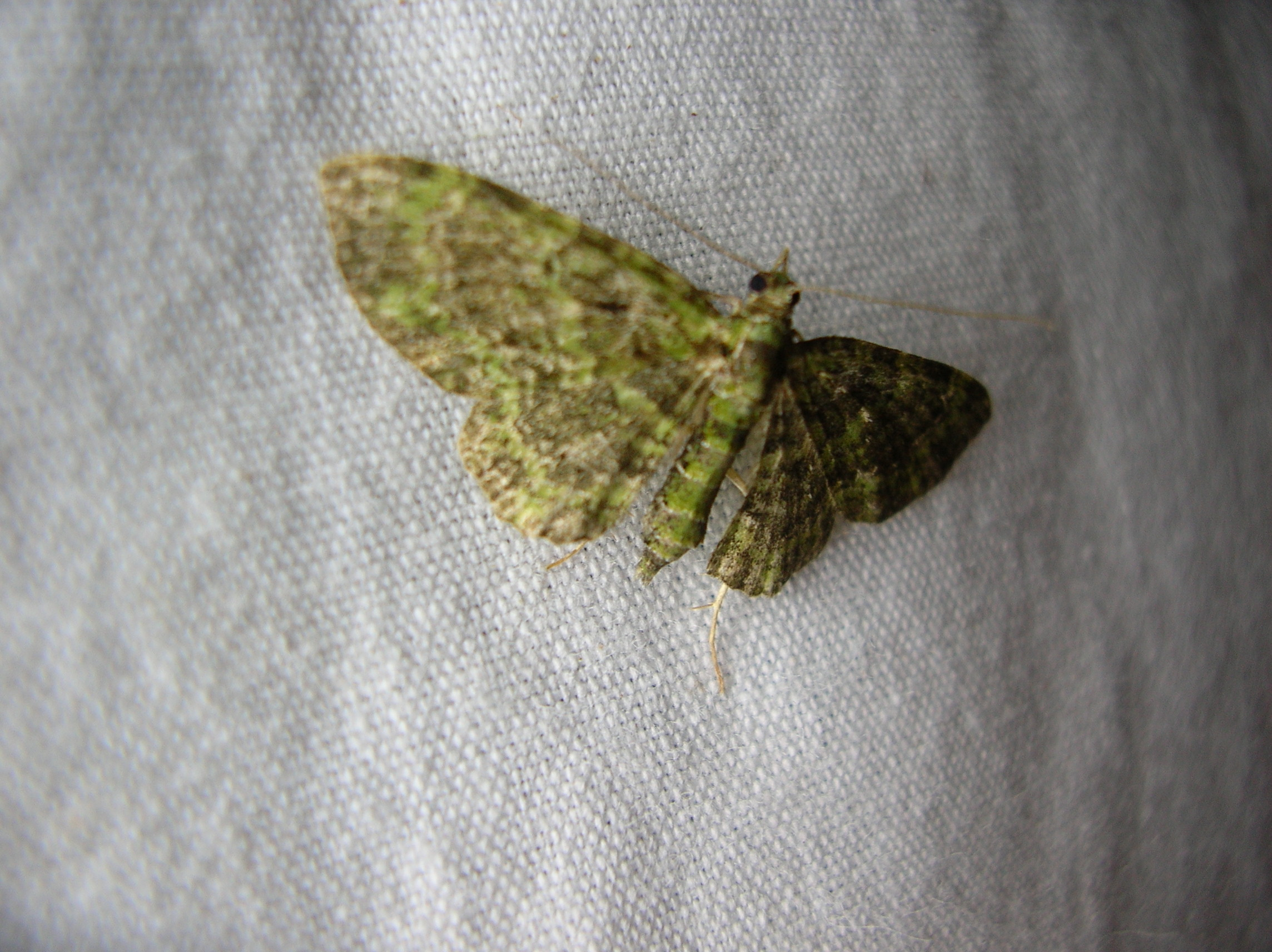

It is known for having its larval form as a caterpillar which is insectivorous. The caterpillar has two abdominal appendages which serve as triggers to initiate a backward motion by which it grasps prey insects using a spiny pair of forelegs.
