= The Trump Show =

- Genre: Documentary
- Directed by: Rob Coldstream
- Starring: Omarosa Manigault Newman; Sean Spicer; Rudy Giuliani; Steve Bannon; John Bolton; Stormy Daniels
- Country of origin: United Kingdom
- Original language: English
- No. of episodes: 4

Production
- Running time: 59-60 minutes

Original release
- Network: BBC
- Release: 15 October 2020 – 19 January 2021

The Trump Show is a BBC documentary television series about Donald Trump, the 45th President of the United States. It first started airing on 15 October 2020 and concluded on 19 January 2021, the day before the Inauguration of Joe Biden.

Directed by Rob Coldstream, the series focuses on the Presidency of Donald Trump and all the controversies and challenges Trump faced in his four years in office (such as the Stormy Daniels scandal, his first impeachment trial, the COVID-19 pandemic, fabricated claims of election fraud, and the Capitol attack). It features interviews from Trump's friends, advisers and close observers.

== Episodes ==
No.	Title	Directed by	Original release date
1	"Episode 1"	Rob Coldstream	15 October 2020
Trump tears up the rule book in the first year of his presidency.
2	"Episode 2"	Rob Coldstream	15 October 2020
Key players shed light on Trump's second year as he faces challenges from his past.
3	"Episode 3"	Rob Coldstream	19 October 2020
Trump faces down impeachment, a pandemic and riots in the months before the US election.
4	"Downfall"	Rob Coldstream	19 January 2021
Trump’s last months as president as he attempts to win, and subsequently overturn, the results of the 2020 election – culminating in scenes of violent ‘insurrection’ against the US Congress.

== Subjects ==
=== Donald Trump's team ===
- Donald Trump
- Melania Trump
- Donald Trump Jr.
- Omarosa Manigault Newman
- Sean Spicer
- Rudy Giuliani
- Steve Bannon
- John Bolton

=== Other subjects featured ===
- Joe Biden
- Barack Obama
- Hillary Clinton
- Kim Jong-un
- Xi Jinping
- Vladimir Putin
- Stormy Daniels

== Reception ==
The Trump Show has received positive reviews from critics. On review aggregator Rotten Tomatoes, the series holds an approval rating of 86%. The Independent described the series as "thoroughly entertaining".
