= Nicky Philipps =

British painter

- Born: Nicola Jane Philipps; 27 August 1964 (age 62)
- Known for: Painter
- Notable work: National Portrait Gallery

Nicola Jane Philipps (born 27 August 1964) is a British artist who rose to prominence in the 2000s as a contemporary portraitist. She painted the first double portrait of Princes William and Harry in 2010.

Philipps was raised by her artistic parents in Wales. Her studio is located in South Kensington, London, England. In between portrait commissions, Philipps paints still lifes and landscapes.

== Portraits ==
Philipps was commissioned in 2002 to paint a large composition of Ken Follett surrounded by characters from his novels. In 2005 Philipps was one of two portrait painters whose paintings were chosen to hang at the BP Exhibition at the National Portrait Gallery (London) and the Garrick Milne Exhibition at Christie's.

In 2012 Philipps was commissioned by Royal Mail to paint a portrait of H M The Queen for the first class stamp, for the stamp series celebrating the 60th Anniversary of the Coronation. This was the first portrait to be commissioned by Royal Mail, and has been gifted to The Queen to hang as part of the Royal Collection. Originally intended to be a head and shoulders portrait, it was Philipps' decision to paint a life size, full length figure and include Her Majesty's four dogs.

In early 2008 Philipps was commissioned by The Trustees of the National Portrait Gallery (London) to paint a portrait of Princes William and Harry, sons of King Charles III and Diana, Princess of Wales. Her double-portrait of the brothers was unveiled at the National Portrait Gallery in London, on 6 January 2010. The two royals are painted wearing the dress uniform of the Blues and Royals, one of the regiments of the Household Cavalry, in the setting of Clarence House, their official residence since 2002 and the home of their father, the then Prince of Wales. "The first portrait of the princes captures them formally dressed, but informally posed. It is a delightful image which extends the tradition of royal portraiture," said National Portrait Gallery director Sandy Nairne.

== Exhibitions ==
Philipps has exhibited in:

- Fine Art Commissions, Duke Street, Solo Exhibition
- Arndean Gallery, Cork Street, Solo Exhibition
- BP Exhibition
- Garrick Milne Exhibition, Christie's
- Family Exhibition, Arndean Gallery, Cork Street
- FAC Annual Portrait Exhibition, Arndean Gallery
- 'artLondon' Contemporary art Fair, London
- Olympia Fine Art and Antiques Fair
- Malcolm Innes Gallery, St James's 1997
- Malcolm Innes Gallery, Walton Street
