= Taskmaster =

Taskmaster may refer to:

== People and characters ==
- A supervisor or boss
- A person capable of performing many tasks; a multitasker in human multitasking
- Taskmaster (character), a Marvel Comics supervillain
- Kevin Sullivan (wrestler) (born 1949), an American wrestler nicknamed "The Taskmaster"

== Taskmaster TV show franchise ==
- Taskmaster (TV series), a British comedy panel show
  - Taskmaster (American TV series), the American edition of the show
  - Taskmaster Australia, the Australian edition
  - Suurmestari, the Finnish edition
  - Taskmaster New Zealand, the New Zealand edition
  - Le maître du jeu, the French Canadian edition
  - Kongen befaler, the Norwegian edition
  - Bäst i test, the Swedish edition
  - Stormester, the Danish edition
  - Direktor svemira, the Croatian edition
  - Dicho y hecho, the Spanish edition
  - Taskmaster (Nederland), the Dutch edition
  - Taskmaster (Polska), the Polish edition

== Other uses ==
- "Taskmaster", song by the grindcore band Pig Destroyer from the album Painter of Dead Girls
- "Taskmaster", song by Hullabaloo from the album Beat Until Stiff

== See also ==
- Task scheduler
- Task manager
- Slave driver
- Multitasker (disambiguation)
- Master (disambiguation)
- Task (disambiguation)
