= The Button (TV series) =

2018 British game show

- Genre: Game show
- Directed by: Andy Devonshire
- Voices of: Alex Horne
- Country of origin: United Kingdom
- Original language: English
- No. of seasons: 1
- No. of episodes: 8

Production
- Executive producers: Alex Horne; Andy Devonshire; Richard Allen Turner; Jon Thoday
- Producer: Sallie Clement
- Editor: Nicola Bitton
- Camera setup: Multi-camera setup
- Running time: 30 minutes
- Production company: Avalon Television Ltd

Original release
- Network: BBC One
- Release: 20 April – 8 June 2018

The Button is a British game show produced by Avalon Television. It aired on BBC One and features teams of families who participate in challenges at random intervals throughout the day for cash prizes. The families interact with "the button" who sets the challenges. At the end of the episode, the family which has won the money can choose to keep it and not appear on the next episode, or can appear next time but risk losing the money they have won.

The show was promoted as "a cross between Gogglebox and Taskmaster", and was created by the same team that created Taskmaster.

== History ==
In August 2017, producers were looking for contestants to take part in the programme. The show was scheduled to start filming in October 2017. It first aired on 20 April 2018 on BBC One.

== Participants ==
Bold indicates that the participants won the episode.

Italic indicates that the participants won the previous episode but returned and lost the episode.

Bold/Italic indicates that the participants won and took the money.

Episode	Date	Family 1	Family 2	Family 3	Family 4	Family 5
1	20 April 2018	**The Garstons**	The Halls	The Ward/Mills	The Marchants	The McCulloughs
2	27 April 2018	The Garstons	**The Halls**	The Ward/Mills	The Marchants	The McCulloughs
3	4 May 2018	The Garstons	The Utleys	**The Ward/Mills**	The Marchants	The McCulloughs
4	11 May 2018	The Garstons	The Utleys	The Ward/Mills	The Marchants	**The McCulloughs**
5	18 May 2018	The Garstons	The Utleys	**The Ward/Mills**	The Marchants	The Mohammeds
6	25 May 2018	The Garstons	**The Utleys**	The Ward/Mills	The Marchants	The Mohammeds
7	1 June 2018	The Garstons	The Utleys	**The Ward/Mills**	The Marchants	The Mohammeds
8	8 June 2018	**The Garstons**	The Utleys	The Jacobs Medleys	The Marchants	The Mohammeds

== Game ==
When the Button turns from green to red the contestants have to hit it to be set a challenge. All five families have to complete the same challenge, and the family to complete it the fastest will win the prize money for that challenge. There are five challenges per episode with the first challenge being worth £1,000, the second being worth £2,000 and so on. The family who wins the most money in an episode can choose to exit the series banking their prize money. However, they can also choose to play the next episode rolling over their prize money with an additional £10,000 bonus but if they lose the next episode then they lose all their money.

The challenges themselves are all completed in the families living rooms where the Button is placed. The challenges vary greatly, some examples include:

- Building a tower from pillows, books and cans
- Bouncing a ping-pong ball into a cup
- Reciting the alphabet backwards without vowels
- Naming the 5th Harry Potter book
- Finding a person called Gary

== Reception ==
The List gave the game show 3/5, The Custard TV said that "the game show borrows heavily from Gogglebox", The Guardian gave the game show 2/5, and Radio Times said that "[v]iewers had provoked a strong reaction, with many taking to social media to express feelings of deep hatred or love for the series opener".

== Transmissions ==
Series	Start date	End date	Episodes
1	20 April 2018	8 June 2018	8
