= Multi =

Multi is a shortened form of "multiple". It may refer to:

- Alternate character, in online gaming
- Multi two diamonds, a contract bridge convention
- Multirhyme, a synonym for feminine rhyme used in hip hop music
- Multi (To Heart), a character from the visual novel and anime series To Heart
- Multi-touch display

== See also ==
- Multiculturalism, a public policy approach for managing cultural diversity in a multiethnic society
- Multitude, a term used by some philosophers to refer to the population of the world
- Multitudes (journal), a French philosophical, political and artistic monthly review
- Multiplication, an elementary arithmetic operation
- Multisexuality, sexual attraction to multiple genders
- Multitasking (disambiguation)
- Multicolor, different color
- Multiplicity (disambiguation)
