= Brain Candy =

Brain Candy may refer to:

- Brain Candy (TV series), 2003 standup comedy variety TV series on BBC Three
- Brain Candy (album), 2020 album by Australian duo Hockey Dad
- Kids in the Hall: Brain Candy, 1996 Canadian comedy film by The Kids in the Hall, directed by Kelly Makin
- Brain Candy Live, 2017 live show tour by Michael Stevens and Adam Savage
