= Andy Devonshire =

British television director and producer

Andy Devonshire is a British television director and producer. His work includes The Apprentice, The Great British Bake Off, and Taskmaster.

== Early life ==
He attended the University of East Anglia where he studied drama and English.

== Awards and nominations ==
| Year | Award | Category | For work on | Other recipients | Result | Ref |
|---|---|---|---|---|---|---|
| 2009 | British Academy Television Awards | Features | The Apprentice | Alan Sugar, Michele Kurland, Kelly Webb-Lamb | Nominated | |
| 2011 | British Academy Television Awards | Entertainment Craft Team | The Apprentice | Mark Saben, Stephen Day, James Clarke | Nominated | |
| 2012 | British Academy Television Awards | Reality And Constructed Factual | Young Apprentice | Darina Healy, Michele Kurland, Colm Martin | Won | |
| 2012 | British Academy Television Awards | Features | The Great British Bake Off | Anna Beattie, Simon Evans, Richard McKerrow | Won | |
| 2015 | British Academy Television Awards | Features | The Great British Bake Off | Anna Beattie, Samantha Beddoes, Simon Evans | Nominated | |
| 2016 | British Academy Television Awards | Features | The Great British Bake Off | Awarded to whole programme | Won | |
| 2016 | Broadcast Awards | Best Entertainment Programme | Taskmaster | Awarded to whole programme | Nominated | |
| 2017 | British Academy Television Awards | Comedy and Comedy Entertainment Programme | Taskmaster | Alex Horne, Andy Cartwright | Nominated | |
| 2017 | Broadcast Awards | Best Entertainment Programme | Taskmaster | Awarded to whole programme | Nominated | |
| 2018 | British Academy Television Awards | Comedy Entertainment Programme | Taskmaster | Andy Cartwright, Alex Horne | Nominated | |
| 2018 | Broadcast Awards | Best Entertainment Programme | Taskmaster | Awarded to whole programme | Won | |
| 2018 | Broadcast Awards | Best Multichannel Programme | Taskmaster | Awarded to whole programme | Nominated | |
| 2018 | Broadcast Awards | TV Moment of the Year | Taskmaster | Awarded to whole programme | Nominated | |
| 2019 | Broadcast Awards | Best Entertainment Programme | Taskmaster | Awarded to whole programme | Nominated | |
| 2019 | Broadcast Awards | Best Multichannel Programme | Taskmaster | Awarded to whole programme | Nominated | |
| 2019 | Broadcast Awards | TV Moment of the Year | Taskmaster | Awarded to whole programme | Nominated | |
| 2020 | British Academy Television Awards | Comedy Entertainment Programme | Taskmaster | Alex Horne, Andy Cartwright, James Taylor | Won | |
| 2020 | Broadcast Awards | Best Entertainment Programme | Taskmaster | Awarded to whole programme | Nominated | |
| 2023 | British Academy Television Awards | Entertainment Craft Team | Taskmaster | James Dillon, Dru Masters, Rebecca Bowker | Nominated | |
| 2023 | British Academy Television Awards | Comedy Entertainment Programme | Taskmaster | Alex Horne, Andy Cartwright, James Taylor | Nominated | |
