= Le maître du jeu =

- Genre: Comedy; Panel game
- Created by: Alex Horne
- Directed by: Daniel Vigneault; Marc-Olivier Valiquette
- Presented by: Louis Morissette
- Starring: Antoine Vézina (assistant)
- Theme music composer: The Horne Section
- Country of origin: Canada
- Original language: French
- No. of series: 4 (+3 specials)
- No. of episodes: 54 (incl. 3 specials)

Production
- Executive producers: Alain Chicoine; Louis Morissette; Louis-Philippe Drolet
- Producers: Véronique Rivard; Marilou Bachir-Legault
- Production locations: Saint-Bruno-de-Montarville, Quebec (task filming); Rialto Theatre, Montreal (studio filming, S1); Studio Cinépool, LaSalle, Quebec (studio filming, S2 & S3)
- Running time: 44 minutes
- Production company: KOTV

Original release
- Network: Noovo
- Release: 15 September 2022 – present

Related
- Taskmaster (British TV series)

Le maître du jeu ("The Master of the Game") is a French-language Canadian comedy panel game show, first broadcast on Noovo in 2022. Based on the Taskmaster format created by comedian Alex Horne, it features a group of five comedians attempting to complete a series of challenges, judged by the Maître du jeu (the Taskmaster), Louis Morissette, with the help of his assistant, Antoine Vézina. It is the second Taskmaster adaptation in the Americas, after the American version. One difference from the original is that there are no tiebreaker tasks, so participants tied for first place all win the episode and share the prize pot.

The show is produced by KOTV, Morissette's production company, in collaboration with Bell Media. It is distributed by Avalon TV. The first season was broadcast in fall 2022, while the second was broadcast in fall 2023. A third season began broadcasting in fall 2024.

== Cast ==
Contestants here are ordered by their surnames, rather than their seat placement (as done in other versions), as their seating order varies by episode.

Key

- * Season champion

Season	Cast				
1	Mehdi Bousaidan	Jo Cormier	Ève Côté *	Christine Morency	Matthieu Pepper
2	Marie-Lyne Joncas	Mona de Grenoble *	Kevin Raphael	Phil Roy	Tammy Verge
HS	Mélissa Bédard	Patrice Bélanger	Virginie Fortin *	Pier-Luc Funk	Pierre Hébert
3	Virginie Fortin *	Bianca Gervais	Alex Perron	Arnaud Soly	Richardson Zéphir
HS	Fabiola Nyrva Aladin	Marie Soleil Dion	Phil Laprise	Stéphane Rousseau *	Geneviève Schmidt
4	Mégan Brouillard	Danick Martineau *	Neev	Marie-Soleil Dion	José Gaudet
HS	Fabien Cloutier *	Mathieu Dufour	Léane Labreche-Dor	Roxane Bruneau	–
5	Sinem Kara	Patrice Bélanger	Anne-Élisabeth Bossé	Mathieu Dufour	Pascal Cameron

== Episodes ==
=== Season 1 (2022) ===
Filming took place in Saint-Bruno-de-Montarville, Quebec in the early summer of 2022, with the in-studio tasks filmed from July 31 to August 8.

No.	Title	Winner	Original release date
1	"Tout le monde gagne" (Everyone wins)	Ève Côté	September 15, 2022
2	"Un pied de sel" (A foot of salt)	Jo Cormier	September 22, 2022
3	"Raaaaaaaacule!" (Ruuuuuuuuuhverse)	Mehdi Bousaidan	September 29, 2022
4	"Toujours un plan B" (Always a plan B)	Christine Morency	October 6, 2022
5	"Soixante-douze essais" (Seventy-two tries)	Ève Côté	October 13, 2022
6	"Je suis un échec" (I am a failure)	Christine Morency	October 20, 2022
7	"Hasta la vista!"	Jo Cormier	October 27, 2022
8	"Todo recto" (Straight ahead)	Ève Côté	November 3, 2022
9	"Le fils de Nicole" (Nicole's son)	Ève Côté & Mehdi Bousaidan (tie)	November 10, 2022
10	"Christoeuf Coulant" (portmanteau of "Christopher Columbus" and "runny egg")	Mehdi Bousaidan	November 17, 2022
11	"On touche, on skip!" (Touch it, skip it!)	Matthieu Pepper	November 24, 2022
12	"La grande finale" (The grand finale)	Christine Morency	December 1, 2022

=== Season 2 (2023) ===
Filming for season 2 had already begun by May. In-studio tasks were filmed from July 30 to August 15.

No.	Title	Winner	Original release date
1	"Attaque de baleine" (Whale attack)	Phil Roy	September 14, 2023
2	"Apitchou" (Achoo)	Marie-Lyne Joncas	September 21, 2023
3	"L'équipe" (The team)	Kevin Raphaël	September 28, 2023
4	"OK Boomer"	Marie-Lyne Joncas	October 5, 2023
5	"Docteur Octopus" (Doctor Octopus)	Marie-Lyne Joncas	October 12, 2023
6	"Masketi"	Phil Roy	October 19, 2023
7	"Ich liebe dich"	Mona de Grenoble	October 26, 2023
8	"Le traître" (The Traitor)	Phil Roy	November 2, 2023
9	"Carpe diem"	Mona de Grenoble	November 9, 2023
10	"La chandelle est morte" (The candle is dead)	Tammy Verge	November 16, 2023
11	"Une opportunité" (An opportunity)	Marie-Lyne Joncas	November 23, 2023
12	"L’autre gravité" (The other gravity)	Marie-Lyne Joncas	November 30, 2023
13	"La grande finale" (The grand finale)	Marie-Lyne Joncas & Mona de Grenoble (tie)	December 7, 2023

=== Holiday special (2023) ===
A one episode holiday special aired on December 14, 2023 with contestants Pierre Hébert, Mélissa Bédard, Patrice Bélanger, Virginie Fortin, and Pier-Luc Funk.

No.	Title	Winner	Original release date
1	"Édition des Fêtes 2023" (Holiday special)	Virginie Fortin	December 15, 2023

=== Season 3 (2024) ===
Production for a third season began by May 2024. It premiered on Noovo on September 12, 2024.

No.	Title	Winner	Original release date
1	"Soir de première" (Premier night)	Bianca Gervais	September 12, 2024
2	"Danser comme Marcel" (Dance like Marcel)	Bianca Gervais & Virginie Fortin (tie)	September 19, 2024
3	"Entre l'ombre et la lumière" (Between shadow and light)	Bianca Gervais	September 26, 2024
4	"Méga le fun" (Mega fun)	Arnaud Soly	October 3, 2024
5	"Trop souvent en bobettes" (Too Often in Your Undies)	Richardson Zéphir	October 10, 2024
6	"Une entourloupe" (A Dirty Trick)	Arnaud Soly & Virginie Fortin (tie)	October 17, 2024
7	"Peau de banane" (Banana Peel)	Virginie Fortin	October 24, 2024
8	"Baby freedom"	Richardson Zéphir	October 31, 2024
9	"De Quito à Quito" (From Quito to Quito)	Virginie Fortin	November 7, 2024
10	"Mort subite" (Sudden Death)	Alex Perron	November 14, 2024
11	"Saxofoune" (Saxo-Fanny)	Alex Perron	November 21, 2024
12	"Fais-moi un grissin" (Make Me a Breadstick)	Arnaud Soly & Virginie Fortin (tie)	November 28, 2024
13	"Reconnaître un champion" (Recognize a Champion)	Richardson Zéphir	December 5, 2024

=== Holiday special (2024) ===
Contestants: Fabiola Nyrva Aladin, Marie Soleil Dion, Phil Laprise, Stéphane Rousseau, Geneviève Schmidt

No.	Title	Winner	Original release date
1	"Édition des Fêtes 2024" (Holiday special)	Stéphane Rousseau	December 12, 2024

=== Season 4 (2025) ===
Contestants: Mégan Brouillard, Danick Martineau, Neev, Marie-Soleil Dion, José Gaudet

No.	Title	Winner	Original release date
1	"Un beau party" (A great party)	Neev	September 11, 2025
2	"Tak"	Marie-Soleil Dion & Neev (tie)	September 18, 2025
3	"Luc et Reluc"	Marie-Soleil Dion	September 25, 2025
4	"Dégât dans l'allée 4" (Cleanup in aisle 4)	Danick Martineau	October 2, 2025
5	"Assez pour gagner" (Enough to win)	Danick Martineau	October 9, 2025
6	"Sur...performer" (Over...performing)	Danick Martineau	October 16, 2025
7	"Sous...performer" (Under...performing)	José Gaudet	October 23, 2025
8	"Ma préférée" (My favourite)	José Gaudet	October 30, 2025
9	"Déchet...ance" (Waste...ing away)	Mégan Brouillard	November 6, 2025
10	"Un « dirty » Vézina"	Mégan Brouillard	November 13, 2025
11	"C'est pas vilain!" (It's not terrible!)	José Gaudet	November 20, 2025
12	"La grande demande" (The big ask)	José Gaudet	November 27, 2025
13	"Soir de finale" (Finale night)	Danick Martineau & Neev (tie)	December 4, 2025
