= The Button series 1 =

The Button
- Series 1
- Presented by: Alex Horne
- No. of episodes: 4

Release
- Original network: BBC One
- Original release: 20 April 2018 – present

The first season of the TV game show competition series The Button premiered in April 2018 on BBC One. The objective of the show is that the family with the most money at the end of the episode from winning the challenges is declared the winning team.

== List of episodes and challenge results ==
=== Episode 1 (20 April) ===
Place No.	Challenge 1	Challenge 2	Challenge 3	Challenge 4	Challenge 5	Winning team
1	N/A; Each team failed	The Halls	The Ward / Mills	The Marchants	The Garstons	The Garstons - £5,000
2	N/A; Each team failed	The Ward / Mills	The Halls	The Ward / Mills	The Halls	The Marchants - £4,000
3	N/A; Each team failed	The Marchants	The Garstons	The Halls	The Ward / Mills	The Ward / Mills - £3,000
4	N/A; Each team failed	The Garstons	The Marchants	The Garstons	The Marchants	The Halls - £2,000
5	N/A; Each team failed	The McCulloughs	The McCulloughs	The McCulloughs	The McCulloughs	The McCulloughs - £0

The Garstons were the winners of the first episode, but decided not to leave the show and keep their cash prize to carry over to the next episode.

=== Episode 2 (27 April) ===
Place No.	Challenge 1	Challenge 2	Challenge 3	Challenge 4	Challenge 5	Winning team
1	The Halls	The Garstons	The Ward / Mills	The Halls	The Halls	The Halls - £10,000
2	The Garstons	The Halls	The Garstons	The Ward / Mills	The Garstons	The Ward / Mills - £0
3	The Marchants	The Marchants	The Halls	The Garstons	The Ward / Mills	The Garstons - £0
4	The Ward / Mills	The McCulloughs	The Marchants	The Marchants	The Marchants	The Halls - £0
5	The McCulloughs	The Ward / Mills	The McCulloughs	The McCulloughs	The McCulloughs	The McCulloughs - £0

The Halls were the winners of the second episode and decided to keep their cash prize, but because they did, they had to leave the show. A new family, the Utleys, were introduced one week after.

=== Episode 3 (4 May) ===
Place No.	Challenge 1	Challenge 2	Challenge 3	Challenge 4	Challenge 5*	Winning team
1	The Marchants	The Ward / Mills	The Marchants	The Ward / Mills	The Ward / Mills; Head-to-head	The Ward / Mills - £11,000
2	The Garstons	The Marchants	The Ward / Mills	The Marchants	The Marchants; Head-to-head	The Marchants - £0
3	The McCulloughs	The Garstons	The McCulloughs; Disqualified	The Garstons	N/A; Could not compete	The Garstons - £0
4	The Utleys	The McCulloughs	The Garstons; Disqualified	The McCulloughs	N/A; Could not compete	The McCulloughs - £0
5	The Ward / Mills	The Utleys	The Utleys; Disqualified	The Utleys	N/A; Could not compete	The Utleys - £0

- The other teams could not compete in Challenge 5 as The Ward / Mills and The Marchants were competing in to the head-to-head against each other.

The Ward/Mills were the winners of the third episode, but decided not to leave the show and keep their cash prize to carry over to the next episode.

=== Episode 4 (11 May) ===
Place No.	Challenge 1	Challenge 2	Challenge 3	Challenge 4	Challenge 5	Winning team
1	The Utleys	The McCulloughs	The McCulloughs	The McCulloughs	The McCulloughs	The McCulloughs - £10,000
2	The Garstons	The Utleys	The Utleys	The Utleys	The Ward / Mills	The Utleys - £0
3	The McCulloughs	The Garstons; Disqualified	The Garstons	The Garstons	The Utleys	The Garstons - £0
4	The Marchants	The Marchants; Disqualified	The Marchants	The Marchants	The Garstons	The Marchants - £0
5	The Ward / Mills	The Ward / Mills	The Ward / Mills	The Ward / Mills	The Marchants	The Ward / Mills - £0

The McCulloughs were the winners of the fourth episode and decided to keep their cash prize, but because they did, they had to leave the show.
