= Multitasking =

Multitasking or task switching may refer to:

- Computer multitasking, the concurrent execution of multiple tasks (also known as processes) over a certain period of time
  - Cooperative multitasking
  - Pre-emptive multitasking
- Context switch in computing
- Human multitasking, the apparent performance by an individual of handling more than one task at the same time
- Media multitasking, using TV, the Web, radio, telephone, print, or any other media in conjunction with another
- Task switching (psychology)

== See also ==
- Task scheduler
- Task manager
- Taskmaster (disambiguation)
- Task (disambiguation)
