= Greg Davies =

Welsh comedian and actor (born 1968)

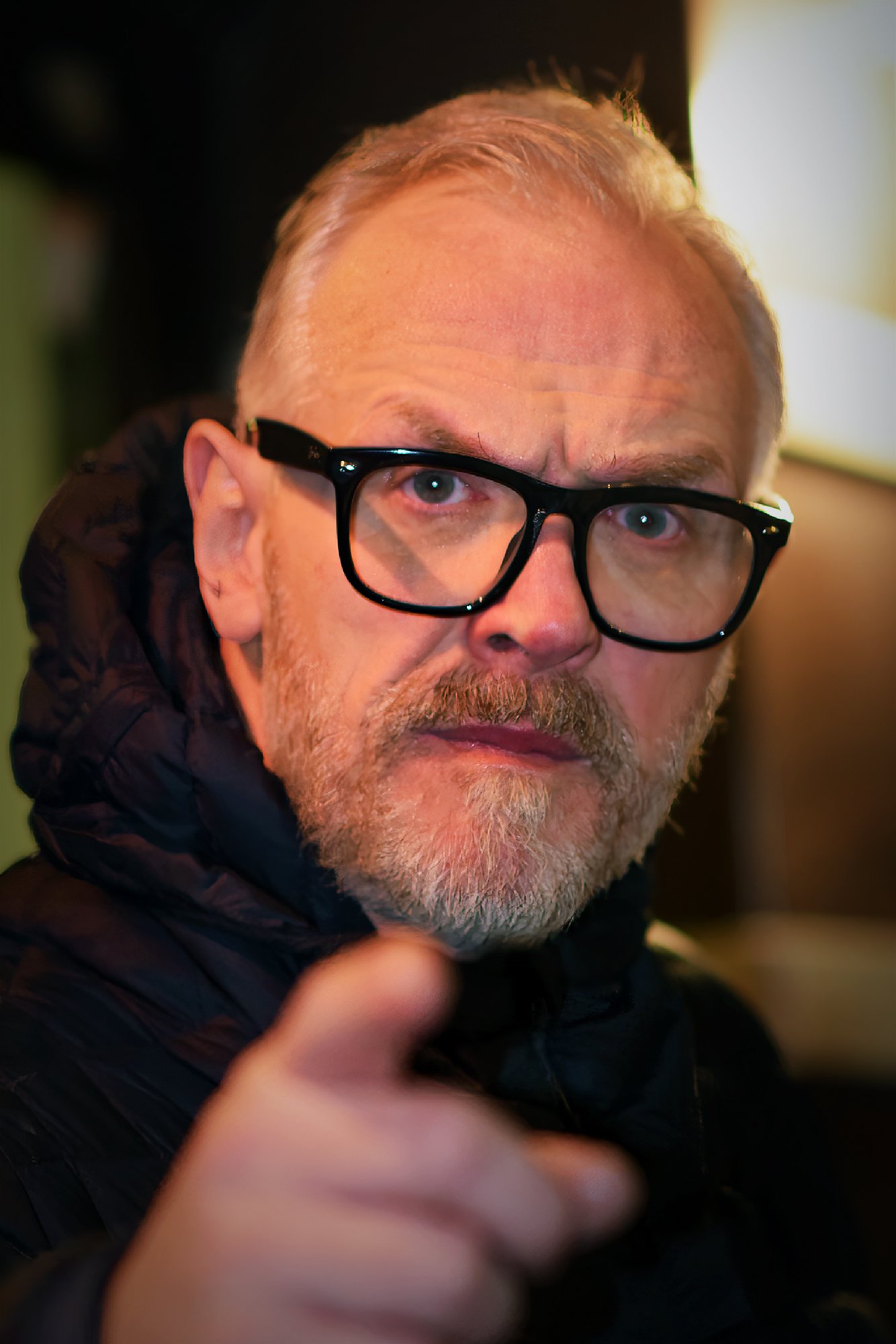
- Davies in 2024
- Born: Gregory Daniel Davies; 14 May 1968 (age 58); St Asaph, Wales
- Occupations: Comedian; actor; presenter; writer
- Years active: 2003–present
- Partner: Liz Kendall (2007–2015)
- Website: gregdavies.co.uk

Gregory Daniel Davies (/ˈdeɪvɪs/ DAY-viss; born 14 May 1968) is a British comedian, actor, presenter, and writer. He is best known for his roles as Mr. Gilbert in The Inbetweeners (2008–2010), Greg in We Are Klang (2009), Ken Thompson in Cuckoo (2012–2019), Dan Davies in Man Down (2013–2017), and Paul "Wicky" Wickstead in The Cleaner (2021–present). He also created Man Down.

Davies has released two Netflix comedy specials, You Magnificent Beast (2018) and Full Fat Legend (2025). He is the host of the comedy panel game shows Taskmaster (2015–present) and Never Mind the Buzzcocks (2021–present) and has appeared on Mock the Week, Fast and Loose, Live at the Apollo, and Would I Lie to You?

For his performance in Cuckoo, Davies was nominated for the BAFTA Television Award for Best Male Comedy Performance in 2013.

== Early life ==
Gregory Daniel Davies was born in St Asaph on 14 May 1968, the son of Pauline and Bob Davies (1936–2014). His Welsh parents lived in England at the time but Bob, a native of Porthmadog, drove Pauline across the border when she went into labour to make sure he was born in Wales. He grew up in the English town of Wem, which he regards as his home. Davies' father, Bob, died in 2014; the Man Down Christmas special is dedicated to both Bob and Rik Mayall, who played Davies' on-screen father, who also died in 2014. He discovered in 2017 that he is a descendant of 12th-century Welsh king Owain the Great.

Davies was educated at Thomas Adams School in Wem, before studying drama and English at Brunel University in Uxbridge. He graduated in 1990. He was a secondary school drama teacher for 13 years before his comedy career, working at Langley Academy, Orleans Park School, and Sandhurst School; large portions of his stand-up comedy routines are often dedicated to discussing his experiences during this time.

== Career ==
=== Film and television ===
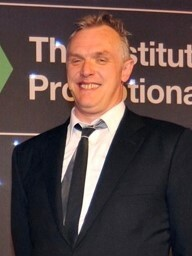
Davies in 2011

In 2003, Davies made an appearance on the children's TV show Dick & Dom in da Bungalow, playing a caricatured version of himself named Massive Greg. In 2005, Davies played a caricature of cricketer W. G. Grace in a series of adverts for Channel 4's coverage of The Ashes.

Davies had his breakthrough role as acerbic college head Mr Gilbert in the E4 sitcom The Inbetweeners (2008–2014). He reprised his role in the follow-up films The Inbetweeners Movie (2011) and The Inbetweeners 2 (2014), and the television special The Inbetweeners: Fwends Reunited (2019). He then starred in the BBC Three sitcom Cuckoo (2012–2019), earning a nomination for the BAFTA Television Award for Best Male Comedy Performance in 2013. He created and starred in Channel 4's sitcom Man Down (2013–2017), which sometimes filmed in the same classroom he previously used as a drama teacher at Sandhurst School.

Davies is the host of the comedy panel game show Taskmaster (2015–present) along with partner Alex Horne. He starred in BBC Two's comedy drama A Gert Lush Christmas (2015) and played King Hydroflax in the Doctor Who Christmas special "The Husbands of River Song" (2015). He created and stars in the BBC One crime comedy series The Cleaner (2021–present), as well as taking over as the host of the music panel show Never Mind the Buzzcocks in 2021.

=== Stand-up comedy ===
Davies began his stand-up comedy career on the independent club circuit in 2005. In 2007, Davies was nominated for three Chortle Awards in the categories "Breakthrough Act" (for his solo stand-up act), "Best Sketch, Variety or Character Act", and "Best Full-Length Show" (both as part of sketch team We Are Klang).

Davies' first solo stand-up show, Firing Cheeseballs at a Dog, was nominated for the Fosters Edinburgh Comedy Awards at the Edinburgh Festival in 2010. The show was subsequently taken on his first tour. He was also nominated for the Edinburgh Fringe's Malcolm Hardee "Act Most Likely to Make a Million Quid" Award.

Davies toured the UK with his second stand-up show, The Back of My Mum's Head, in 2013. Davies toured with his third stand-up show, You Magnificent Beast, in 2017; a performance at the Hammersmith Apollo was filmed and released as his debut Netflix comedy special You Magnificent Beast in 2018. Davies filmed his second Netflix comedy special, Full Fat Legend, at the Royal Albert Hall for release in 2027.

== Personal life ==
Greg Davies has been noted for his height of 6 ft 8 in (2.03 m), which often plays a role in his comedic performances. He lives in the Kennington area of London, and was in a relationship with Labour Party politician Liz Kendall from 2007 to 2015.

In December 2022, Davies was awarded an honorary Doctorate of Humanities from his alma mater Brunel University. In May 2024, Davies was the guest for BBC Radio 4's Desert Island Discs, where his musical choices included "Baggy Trousers" by Madness and "Wichita Lineman" by Glen Campbell.

In October 2025 Greg Davies was made an "honorary townsman" of Wem, in Shropshire, where he grew up.

Davies has appeared on Who Do You Think You Are?, during which he discovered that his long lost great-great grandfather, Evan Owen, grew up on The Owen Family Farm (Cwm Mawr) in the Hills of Snowdonia, which has been traced back at least eight generations to 1660; Evan Owen’s brother was the last to farm the land. Also revealed was that the Owen family were descended from Owain Gwynedd, the King of Gwynedd in the 12th century and the first Prince of Wales.

== Filmography ==
=== Film and television ===
Year	Title	Role	Notes	Ref.
2003	Dick & Dom in da Bungalow	Massive Greg		
2006	Girls? Eugh!	Uncredited		
2007	The Musical Storytellers Ginger & Black	Mr Hopkirk		
2007	Saxondale	Dunc		
2007	ChuckleVision	Henry VIII (Series 19, Episode 4)		
2007–2008	CBBC Office	Various characters		
2008	The Wall	Various characters		
2008–2010	The Inbetweeners	Mr. Gilbert		
2009	We Are Klang	Greg		
2010–2011	Ask Rhod Gilbert	Himself		
2010–2012	Have I Got News for You	Himself	3 episodes	
2011	Fast and Loose	Himself		
2011	The Inbetweeners Movie	Mr Gilbert		
2011–2019	Would I Lie To You	Himself	5 episodes	
2012–19	Cuckoo	Ken Thompson		
2013–2017	Man Down	Dan Davies	Creator and writer	
2014	This Is Jinsy	Jennitta Bishard		
2014	The Inbetweeners 2	Mr. Gilbert		
2014	Rik Mayall: Lord of Misrule	Himself		
2015	A Gert Lush Christmas	Uncle Tony		
2015	Doctor Who	King Hydroflax	Episode: "The Husbands of River Song"	
2015	QI	Himself	Series M, Episode 6	
2015–present	Taskmaster	Himself / The Taskmaster		
2016	Travel Man	Himself		
2016	Top Gear	Himself/Star in a Rallycross Car		
2016	Asterix: The Mansions of the Gods	The Centurion (English dub)		
2017	Who Do You Think You Are?	Himself		
2017	Comic Relief 2017	Himself		
2018	Teen Titans Go! To the Movies	Balloon Man (voice)		
2019	The Inbetweeners: Fwends Reunited	Mr. Gilbert		
2019	Greg Davies: Looking for Kes	Himself		
2020	Taskmaster NZ	Himself (Series 1, Episode 7)		
2021–present	The Cleaner	Paul Wickstead; Creator and writer		
2021–present	Never Mind the Buzzcocks	Himself / Presenter		
2022	The Horne Section TV Show	Himself	Episode 1	
2023	Brassic	Dick Dolphin	Christmas special	
2024	The Completely Made-Up Adventures of Dick Turpin	Leslie Duvall	Guest role	
2026	BAFTA Television Awards	Himself	Host	

==== Stand-up specials ====
Year	Title	No. of shows	Notes
2011	Firing Cheeseballs at a Dog		DVD release
2013	The Back of My Mum's Head	47 dates	DVD release
2018	You Magnificent Beast	53 dates	Netflix release
2025	Full Fat Legend		Netflix release Planned 2027

== Awards and nominations ==
Year	Award	Category	Work	Result
2011	British Comedy Awards	Best Breakthrough Comedy Artist	Firing Cheeseballs at a Dog	Nominated
2013	2013 British Academy Television Awards	Best Male Performance in a Comedy Program	Cuckoo	Nominated
