= Alex Horne =

English comedian and musician (born 1978)

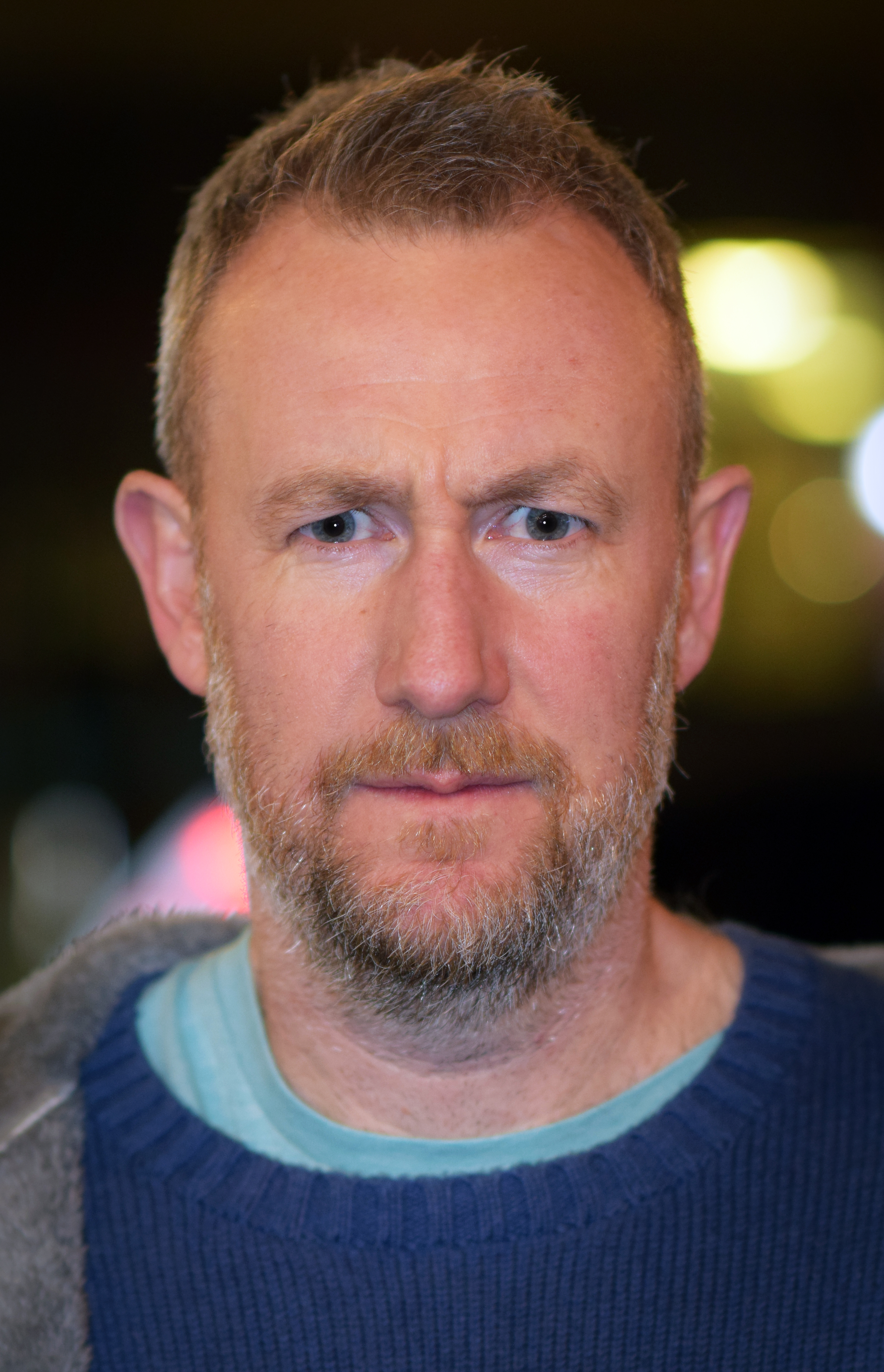
- Horne in 2024
- Born: Alexander James Jeffery Horne; 10 September 1978 (age 48); Chichester, West Sussex, England
- Other name: Little Alex Horne
- Education: Sidney Sussex College, Cambridge
- Occupations: Comedian, writer, musician
- Years active: 2000–present
- Spouse: Rachel Horne (m. 2005)
- Children: 3
- Website: alexhorne.com

Alexander James Jeffery Horne (born 10 September 1978) is an English comedian. He is the creator of the BAFTA award-winning TV series Taskmaster, in which he takes the role of assistant to the Taskmaster, Greg Davies. He is the host and bandleader of comedic band The Horne Section. Horne hosts the band's eponymous podcast and television series, and has appeared with them on BBC Radio 4, TV channel Dave, and 8 Out of 10 Cats Does Countdown.

== Early life ==
Alexander James Jeffery Horne was born in Chichester, West Sussex, England on 10 September 1978. His father worked as a general practitioner. The middle child of three boys, he was raised in Midhurst. Horne originally attended a state primary school, before he was enrolled into a private school when he was ten years old; he mentioned in a 2024 interview that he was "embarrassed about [it] for many years" but he "now fully embrace[s]" it.

He was educated at independent Lancing College (1991–1996) and at Sidney Sussex College, Cambridge, where he studied classics and graduated in 2001. While at Cambridge, he was a member of the Footlights, and he wrote for student newspaper Varsity as a sports journalist and satirist. Horne went on to complete a graduate degree in broadcast journalism at Goldsmiths, University of London.

== Career ==
=== Early career ===
Horne began his stand-up comedy career at open mic nights in Cambridge and London while he was still a student, and performed in the semi-final of So You Think You're Funny in 1999. He made his first of many appearances at the Edinburgh Festival Fringe in 2000 in the show "How to Avoid Huge Ships". Early in his career, Horne also worked as a journalist for local newspapers in Sussex, and as a runner on television sets.

Horne's 2003 Edinburgh show "Making Fish Laugh" was nominated for a Perrier Award for Best Newcomer. In 2004, he won a Chortle Award for Best Breakthrough Act. In 2004 and 2005, he performed "Every Body Talks" and "When in Rome", in which Tim Key played his personal assistant and he used Microsoft PowerPoint for presentation. In early 2006, Horne performed "When in Rome" on a tour exclusively visiting Roman towns in Britain.

As a solo performer, Horne wrote and performed "Birdwatching" at the 2007 Edinburgh Festival and "Wordwatching" at the 2008 Edinburgh Festival. He wrote a book entitled Birdwatchingwatching in 2009 as well as Wordwatching in early 2010.

On 18 January 2007, Horne became the first comedian to perform in Second Life for a feature on Sky News. Between 24 October 2006 and 24 October 2007, he worked alongside fellow comedian Owen Powell in an attempt to find a person from every nationality living in London. After a year's search, they finally managed to meet people from 189 of the UN's 192 countries, and hence suggested there is nobody in the city from Tuvalu, Palau, or the Marshall Islands.

=== The Horne Section ===
Since 2010, Horne has been performing with his band The Horne Section as the compere of comedy variety shows. Alex Horne Presents The Horne Section (2012–14) ran for three series on BBC Radio 4, and The Horne Section Podcast launched in 2018.

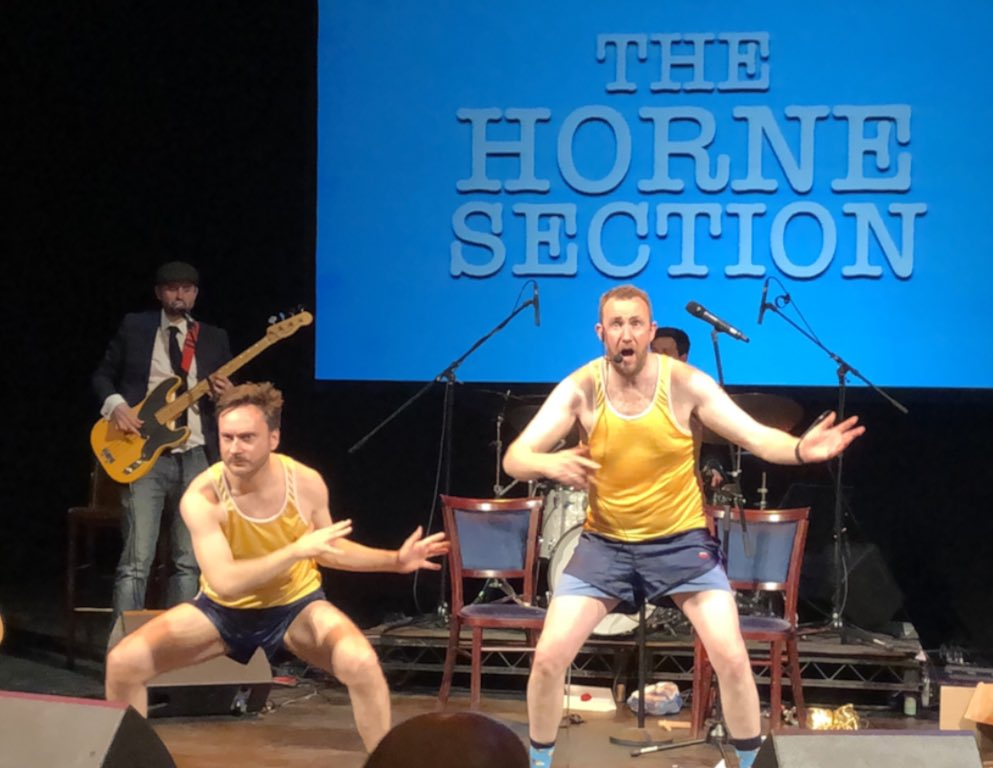
The Horne Section performing in 2019

In May 2018, Horne presented The Horne Section Television Programme, a one-off musical comedy stage show based on his BBC Radio 4 show, The Horne Section. The show was recorded for UKTV in front of a live audience at the London Palladium and aired on Dave on 24 May. The show featured his band, The Horne Section, as well as performances from comedians Sue Perkins, Sara Pascoe and Joe Wilkinson, drag act and opera singer Le Gateau Chocolat, and Girls Aloud singer Nadine Coyle.

A six-episode Channel 4 series, The Horne Section TV Show, was released on 3 November 2022. It is scripted and combines elements of musical comedy, talk show and sitcom. A second six-episode series was ordered and was scheduled for production in 2023. The second series aired on 8 May 2025 on Channel 4's streaming service.

On 11 December 2025, The Horne Section started a twenty-four hour concert in Battersea Power Station, dubbed the "How-Long-Athon", to raise money for Stand Up to Cancer; the performance, which started at 10pm, consisted of only one song, "How Long" by Ace, and featured other comedians joining Horne on stage, including Isy Suttie, Kerry Godliman, Asim Chaudhry, Bridget Christie, Flo and Joan, Phil Ellis, Sara Pascoe, Beverley Knight, Jamelia, Kojey Radical, Mr Blobby, and Dara Ó Briain. The marathon ended at 11pm on 12 December.

=== Taskmaster ===
The concept of Taskmaster was created by Horne in early 2009. There were many inspirations for the game, including his time working on Big Brother and The Crystal Maze, and his envy of his friend, comedian Tim Key, winning the Edinburgh Comedy Award that same year. By September 2009, Horne had created a series of tasks, which he emailed to twenty comedians and asked them to complete over the course of a year; these included Tim Key, Mark Watson, Joe Wilkinson and Mike Wozniak, all of whom have since appeared on the British Taskmaster television series. Their attempts were filmed, and in August 2010, Horne presented their efforts at the Edinburgh Fringe festival. Billed as "The Task Master", Wozniak was the overall winner.

A second Fringe show, this time billed as Taskmaster II, included ten contestants, nine of whom had been in the first, and was held at the following festival in 2011; Josie Long was crowned winner.

Channel 4 paid for a pilot episode, before the show was ultimately picked up by Dave. Since 2015, Horne has served as co-host alongside Greg Davies in the Taskmaster series. It was originally broadcast on Dave and transferred to Channel 4 in 2020.

In 2018, Horne co-hosted the American remake of the show, which carried a shorter but similar format to the British series. Versions of the programme have also been made in Australia, Belgium, Canada, Croatia, Finland, Sweden, Norway, Denmark, Spain, Portugal, New Zealand and Poland. The show was awarded a BAFTA. A running joke in the show is that Davies introduces Horne as "Little Alex Horne".

As of June 2026, the British Taskmaster programme has aired twenty one series, and also produced four "Champion of Champions" and five "New Year's Treat" specials.

Horne has since branched Taskmaster out to other events outside of television. In 2025, he hosted a series of games in a retirement home in Adderbury, and that same year he partnered up with English Heritage to tour the UK to set out tasks for members of the public to perform. In 2026, he and Davies toured the United States in a Taskmaster live experience show.

=== Other work and appearances ===
In 2011, Horne appeared on BBC One's Celebrity Mastermind; his specialist subject was the comedian Ken Dodd, and he finished in 2nd place with a score of 25. During Comic Relief 2011's 24 Hour Panel People marathon, Horne appeared on the Call My Bluff segment, on a team with Tim Key and Roisin Conaty. Horne also appeared in the TV show on BBC Three called Britain in Bed in 2011. He appeared as a guest on The Matt Lucas Awards on 16 April 2013 where he won "The Bravest Guest" Award.

He has appeared eight times on 8 Out of 10 Cats Does Countdown, seven as a Dictionary Corner guest, and once as a replacement for Joe Wilkinson. In April 2018, Horne voiced a talking Button in the BBC One's game show The Button. He has appeared twice as a contestant on The Chase on ITV.

Horne, along with Tim Key and Mark Watson, created the YouTube series No More Jockeys during the 2020 coronavirus lockdown in the UK, itself based upon their earlier BBC web series No More Women. Horne also hosts the YouTube channel Bad Golf with John Robins.

In 2025, Horne worked as a producer on a documentary about Chesham United F.C., set to be released on YouTube in episodes in December 2025.

In 2026, Horne provided voice over for Earwigs, an episode of Game Changer, on Dropout.

== Personal life ==
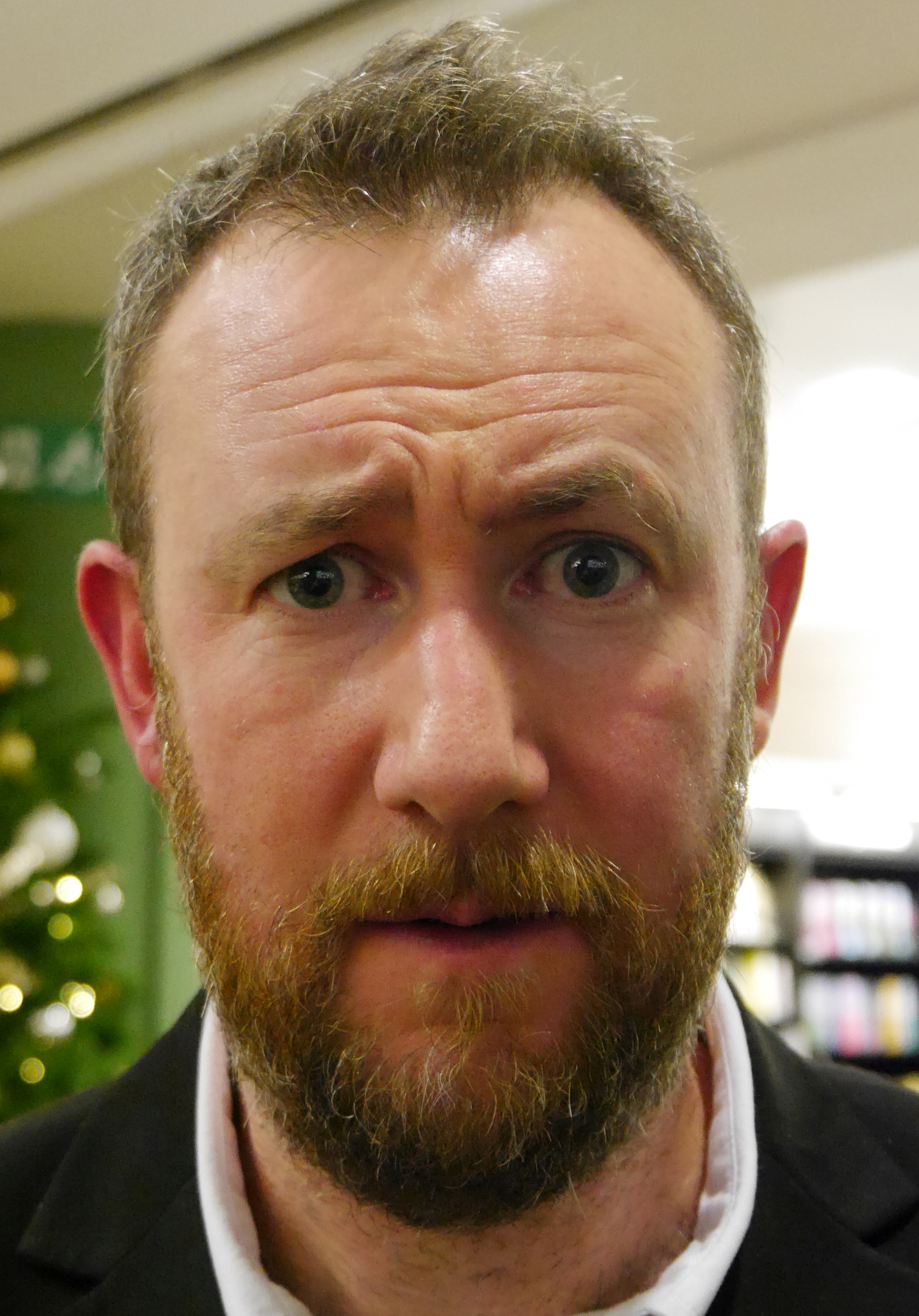
Horne in 2018

Horne married former BBC business journalist Rachel Horne on 1 January 2005, whom he met at Sidney Sussex College, Cambridge. The couple have three sons. He has lived in Chesham, Buckinghamshire for more than two decades.

Horne appeared as a contestant on Countdown in August 2008, winning three matches before being defeated.

He is a birdwatcher, which he describes as the perfect activity "for someone who likes sport but is getting too old to play, likes the outdoors and is slightly anal". He is a supporter of Liverpool F.C. and is a director of his local team Chesham United F.C.

In January 2024, Horne was awarded an honorary doctorate by the University of Warwick.

== Filmography ==
Year	Title	Role	Notes
2003	Brain Candy	Self, performer	4 episodes: "Families", "Shopping", "Exercise", "Surreal"
2008	Countdown	Self, contestant	Series 59; 4 episodes
2009–2010	We Need Answers	Self, presenter	Series 1 & 2; 16 episodes. Also creator, writer
2009–2010	No More Women	Self, commentator, contestant	10 episodes
2010	The Games That Time Forgot	Self, presenter	Television documentary film. Also writer
2011	Celebrity Mastermind	Self, contestant	Series 9; episode 9
2011	Call My Bluff	Self, contestant (team captain)	Comic Relief Special
2012	Never Mind the Buzzcocks	Self, host	Series 26; episode 9
2012–2013	Dara Ó Briain: School of Hard Sums	Self, special guest	Series 1 & 2; 4 episodes
2013–2020	8 Out of 10 Cats Does Countdown	Self, guest (with The Horne Section)	11 episodes
2014	Celebrity Fifteen to One	Self, contestant	Christmas Special
2014	Live at the Electric	The Oracle	Series 3, episode 4
2015	Drunk History	Self, drunk storyteller	Series 1, episode 5
2015	The Electrictionary: Introduction	The Announcer	Short film
2015–present	Taskmaster	Self, The Taskmaster's assistant	Series 1–21, 204 episodes; producer, creator, writer
2016	Alan Davies: As Yet Untitled	Self, panellist	Series 4, episode 10: "Cream Cakes and Pernod"
2016, 2018	Celebrity Chase	Self, contestant	2 episodes
2018	Taskmaster (US)	Self, The Taskmaster's assistant	U.S. adaptation of Taskmaster. 8 episodes. Also producer
2018	The Horne Section Television Programme	Self (with The Horne Section)	Television Special
2018	The Button	Self, The Button (voice)	8 episodes. Also producer
2018–2025	The Last Leg	Self (with The Horne Section)	11 episodes
2019	Richard Osman's House of Games	Self, contestant	Series 3; 5 episodes
2019, 2022	Pointless Celebrities	Self, contestant	2 episodes
2019–2022	Bad Golf	Self, presenter	Web series 1–3; 55 episodes
2019–2025	Taskmastermind	Self, presenter	Web series 1–3; 12 episodes
2020	Peter Crouch: Save Our Summer	Self, presenter	8 episodes
2020	Richard Osman's House of Games Night	Self, contestant	Christmas Special
2020–2024	No More Jockeys	Self, contestant	Web series 1–5, started in lockdown; 87 episodes
2021	Would I Lie to You?	Self, panellist	Series 14; episode 7
2021	Crouchy's Year-Late Euros	Self, presenter	10 episodes
2021	I Literally Just Told You	Self, contestant	Series 1; episode 3: "Celebrity"
2022	The Great Celebrity Bake Off for SU2C	Self, contestant	Series 5; episode 1
2022	Blankety Blank	Self, panellist	Series 20; episode 10: "Christmas Special"
2022, 2025	The Horne Section TV Show	Self (with The Horne Section)	Series 1 and 2; 12 episodes; also producer
2024	Have I Got News for You	Self, guest presenter	Series 67; episode 10
2024, 2026	Taskmaster Australia	Self (cameos), Concetta Caristo's Heavenly Voice & Horse Race Commentator	Season 3, episode 9: "A Bit of a Pickle"; Season 5, episode 8: "Australia's Occasional Sweetheart"
2025	Jazz Emu: Ego Death	Qwæsian	Short film
2025	Game Changer	Self, cameo & Voiceover	Season 7, episode 6: "One and Done"; Season 8, episode 7: "Earwigs"
2025	Burger Van Man	Police Dispatcher (voice)	Short film

== Bibliography ==
- Birdwatchingwatching. Virgin Books. 2009. ISBN 9780753515761.
- Wordwatching. Virgin Books. 2010. ISBN 9781905264612.
- Taskmaster: 200 Extraordinary Tasks for Ordinary People. BBC Books. 2018. ISBN 978-1785943584.
- Bring Me the Head of the Taskmaster: 101 Next-Level Tasks (And Clues) To Lead You To Victory. Penguin Random House. 2021. ISBN 978-1-529-14843-5.
- An Absolute Casserole: Ten Years of Taskmaster. Quercus. November 2024. ISBN 9781529441529. OCLC 1438664716.
- The Last Pebble. Walker Books Ltd. 3 July 2025. ISBN 9781529502565.
