= Brain Candy (TV series) =

British television comedy series

- Starring: Noel Fielding; Jimmy Carr; Alan Carr; Gina Yashere
- Theme music composer: Fatboy Slim
- Country of origin: United Kingdom
- Original language: English
- No. of series: 1
- No. of episodes: 14

Production
- Camera setup: Single camera
- Running time: 15 minutes (approx.)
- Production company: Baby Cow Productions

Original release
- Network: BBC Three
- Release: 22 June – 16 December 2003

Brain Candy is a standup comedy variety programme broadcast on BBC Three in 2003. A total of 14 episodes, filmed on location around London, were broadcast, featuring then up-and-coming comedians, including Paul Foot, Alan Carr, Jimmy Carr, Gina Yashere, Noel Fielding, Alex Horne, and others. The soundtrack was produced by Fatboy Slim.
