= The Task =

The Task may refer to:

- The Task (poem), a 1785 poem by William Cowper
- The Task (film), a 2011 horror film directed by Alex Orwell
- The Mission (play), a 1979 drama by Heiner Müller
