= Taskmaster (American TV series) =

American comedy panel game show

- Genre: Comedy; Panel game show
- Based on: Taskmaster by Alex Horne
- Presented by: Reggie Watts; Alex Horne (umpire)
- Country of origin: United States
- Original language: English
- No. of seasons: 1
- No. of episodes: 8

Production
- Running time: 30 minutes (including advertisements)

Original release
- Network: Comedy Central
- Release: April 27 – May 18, 2018

Related
- Taskmaster (British TV series)

Taskmaster (also known as Taskmaster US) is an American comedy panel game show which aired for one season in 2018. The series was adapted from the original British version of the same name.

The series stars comedian and actor Reggie Watts in the title role of the Taskmaster. The Taskmaster issues simple comedic and bizarre tasks to a panel of five celebrities contestants who attempt to complete the tasks and earn points. The tasks are administered by British comedian Alex Horne in the role of the Taskmaster's assistant. Horne created the original format of Taskmaster, and reprises his assistant role from the British series.

== History ==
The Taskmaster format was originally created by Alex Horne for the Edinburgh Festival Fringe in 2010, with Horne tasking several of his comedian friends with performing tasks, and then assessing their performance. He presented the results at the festival.

The format was picked up for a UK television show in 2015 with Greg Davies hired in the role of Taskmaster, the figurehead ostensibly assigning and ultimately judging the tasks, and Horne acting as his assistant.

After several seasons of the UK series, an American adaptation was commissioned in 2017 to be aired on Comedy Central. Comedian and actor Reggie Watts was cast in the title role of the Taskmaster. Horne acted as Watts's assistant. Besides Horne, other elements of the UK series were incorporated into the US version including the theme and interstitial music, the ornate thrones the Taskmaster and Horne sit on, the form of the sealed tasks, and the general style of the Taskmaster house (including the satirical artistic portraits of the Taskmaster).

The first season of the show was recorded in California. It premiered on April 27, 2018 The series was not renewed for a second season.

== Format ==
As with the original UK series, Taskmaster pits five comedians against each other in a competition to earn points by completing assigned tasks. Most of the tasks were filmed over a period of time on location at a house that is purported to be one of the Taskmaster's many houses. The contestant filmed their tasks separately from each other and don't know how the others' performed.

Many of the tasks are time-based, rewarding the fastest performance. The tasks are often worded such that creative or "lateral" thinking may allow contestants to perform a task faster or better; such as by completing the task in a way that is not the obvious way implied by the wording of the task, but is not prohibited by the wording of the task. For example, a task that prohibits contestants from crossing a line may not explicitly restrict them from moving the line. Some of the tasks are re-used from the British version of the show.

Each episode consists of the five contestants, Watts and Horne seated before a live audience in a theater. Horne presents edited footage of the five contestants completing one of the pre-recorded tasks, and Watts judges their performances and awards points, generally with 5 points for the best performance and 1 point for the worst performance (or 0 for failures or disqualifications). Each episode consists of several pre-recorded tasks followed by a final live task performed on stage before Watts and the theatrical audience.

The winner of each episode receives a prize brought in by one of the contestants, Horne or Watts as an object that is meaningful to them, though generally of little value to anyone else. This differs from the UK series where each episode, all five contestants contributed a prize fitting a certain theme, and the winner received all five prizes (these prizes were themselves ranked for points as the first task of each episode).

Points are also totaled over the course of the season, with the highest scorer winning a trophy in the shape of the Taskmaster's head. This follows along the lines of the British series, though the US head trophy is not life-sized.

The titular Taskmaster ostensibly sets the tasks, which are delivered to the contestants typed on folded task cards that are sealed with a wax seal.

== Episodes ==
The contestants for this series were Dillon Francis, Freddie Highmore, Kate Berlant, Lisa Lampanelli and Ron Funches, with Berlant being the overall winner of the season.

| No. | Title | Winner | Original release date |
|---|---|---|---|
| 1 | "Physics" | Freddie Highmore | April 27, 2018 |
| 2 | "Ebony" | Kate Berlant | April 27, 2018 |
| 3 | "Bubbles" | Kate Berlant | May 4, 2018 |
| 4 | "Die, Die, Die" | Lisa Lampanelli | May 4, 2018 |
| 5 | "Magnets & Magic" | Dillon Francis | May 11, 2018 |
| 6 | "Engineering" | Kate Berlant | May 11, 2018 |
| 7 | "Hostage" | Kate Berlant | May 18, 2018 |
| 8 | "101 Ducks" | Lisa Lampanelli | May 18, 2018 |

== Reception ==
The show received mostly positive reviews, though some critics compared it unfavorably to the original series.

Greg Davies and Alex Horne (Taskmaster and umpire of the British version) later said the show would have worked better with fewer changes from the UK format.
