= Suurmestari =

Entertainment program

- Genre: Comedy, panel game
- Created by: Alex Horne
- Presented by: Jaakko Saariluoma
- Starring: Pilvi Hämäläinen
- Country of origin: Finland
- Original language: Finnish
- No. of series: 6
- No. of episodes: 62 (list of episodes)

Production
- Production locations: Task filmings: Kulosaari Mansion (Seasons 1-2); Stansvik Mansion (Season 3); Jollas Mansion (Season 4); Villa Frosterus (Season 5-6)
- Running time: 44 minutes
- Production company: Rabbit Films

Original release
- Network: MTV3
- Release: April 12, 2020 – present

Related
- Taskmaster (British TV series)

Suurmestari (Finnish for 'Grand Master') is a Finnish comedy panel program on MTV3 that started on April 12, 2020, based on the British Taskmaster television format. Competitors perform various tasks that they receive from the Grand Master.

The Grand Master is portrayed by Jaakko Saariluoma, and Pilvi Hämäläinen serves as the judge. In the each episode of each Season, there are four regular contestants with different fifth changing competitor each episode. Competitors perform tasks for points and the one with the most points wins. In each episode, the prize is different items from the competitors that the competitors have brought with them. The winner of each episode gets all the items brought in. The overall season winner, which is one of the regular contestants, wins the "Grand Master Statue", and is the contestant of the season. Tiebreaker tasks are not featured in Suurmestari.

The first series took a summer break on 17 May 2020, with three episodes from the first production season not shown, and the remaining episodes were shown on MTV3 and the streaming service on MTV from 13 to 27 August 2020. More episodes were released on 17 May 2020. The first season was a great success, and for that, on August 27, 2020, a second season of the series was announced for spring of 2021.

Suurmestari has won the Golden Venla award of the "Best Game Show" five consecutive times in the row; in 2020, 2021, 2022, 2023, and 2024.

In 2024, the series got a spin-off show, called Juniori Suurmestari (Junior Grand Master), where instead of well-known Finnish comedians or actors, ordinary Finnish children aged 8–13 get to compete for series of surprise rewards.

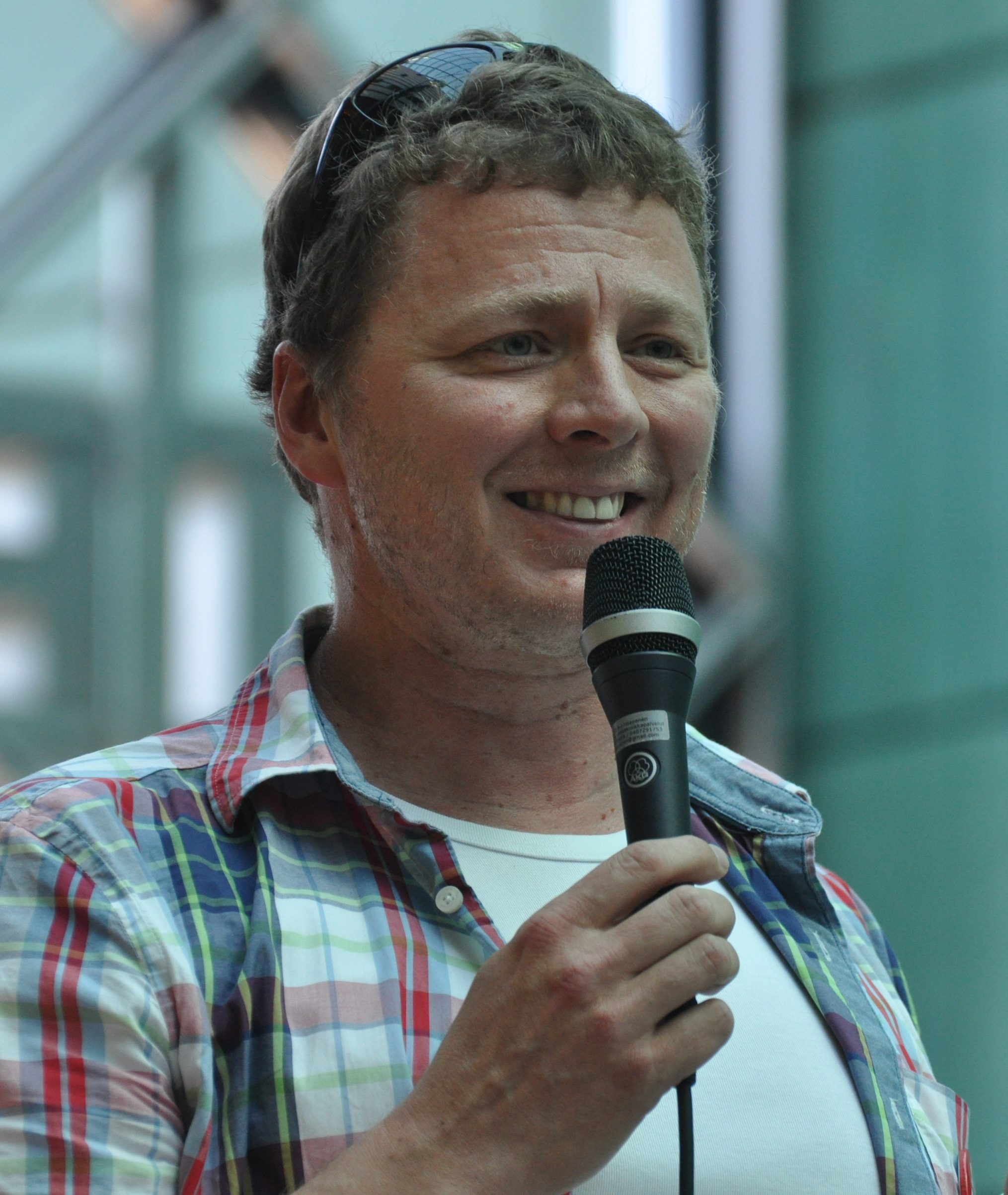
Host of Suurmestari, Jaakko Saariluoma.

== Cast ==
Season	Seating			
Season	1st	2nd	3rd	4th
1	Janne Kataja	Roni Bäck	Jukka Hildén †	Jenni Poikelus
2	Miika Nousiainen	Minka Kuustonen †	Aku Hirviniemi	Kiti Kokkonen
3	Riku Rantala †	Anna-Maija Tuokko	Mikko Penttilä	Jenni Pääskysaari
4	Kalle Lamberg †	Eija Vilpas	Fathi Ahmed	Pirjo Heikkilä
5	Eero Ritala	Pamela Tola	Joonas Nordman	Pirjo Lonka †
6	Elias Salonen †	Iina Kuustonen	Kari Hietalahti	Sonja Kailassaari

Indicator
† Winner

=== Contestants’ scores ===
In bold are the winners’ scores.

Season	Contestants’ scores				Ref.
1	Janne Kataja (143)	Roni Bäck (135)	**Jukka Hildén** **(156)**	Jenni Poikelus (143)	
2	Miika Nousiainen (154)	**Minka Kuustonen** **(158)**	Aku Hirviniemi (134)	Kiti Kokkonen (134)	
3	**Riku Rantala** **(180)**	Anna-Maija Tuokko (157)	Mikko Penttilä (175)	Jenni Pääskysaari (173)	
4	**Kalle Lamberg** **(166)**	Eija Vilpas (130)	Fathi Ahmed (154)	Pirjo Heikkilä (151)	
5	Eero Ritala (197)	Pamela Tola (197)	Joonas Nordman (196)	**Pirjo Lonka** **(207)**	
6	**Elias Salonen** **(161)**	Iina Kuustonen (149)	Kari Hietalahti (158)	Sonja Kailassaari (150)	

== Series overview ==
Series overview
Series	Episodes	Originally released	
Series	Episodes	First released	Last released
1	10	12 April 2020	27 August 2020
2	10	27 March 2021	2 June 2021
3	10	16 April 2022	2 July 2022
4	10	18 March 2023	26 May 2023
5	12	16 March 2024	1 June 2024
JR	4	30 November 2024	21 December 2024
7	10	27 April 2025	6 July 2025

== Episodes ==
=== Season 1 (2020) ===
This is the first season of Suurmestari. The regular contestants of the season were Jukka Hildén, Jenni Poikelus, Roni Bäck and Janne Kataja. The season was won by Jukka Hildén.

No.	Title (in english)	Guest	Winner	Original release date	FIN viewers (millions)
1	"Collect tears"	Mikko Leppilampi	Mikko Leppilampi	12 April 2020	0.698
2	"Order fantasy-pizza"	Miitta Sorvali	Jukka Hildén	12 April 2020	0.649
3	"Heart rate on the rise"	Jorma Uotinen	Jukka Hildén	19 April 2020	0.580
4	"Lose the ice cube"	Minka Kuustonen	Jenni Poikelus	26 April 2020	0.673
5	"Interview an estonian"	Mikko Penttilä	Jukka Hildén	3 May 2020	0.639
6	"Weight on the scale"	Paula Noronen	Paula Noronen	10 May 2020	0.633
7	"Set up a tent"	Minttu Mustakallio	Janne Kataja	17 May 2020	0.678
8	"Make the subject blush"	Pekka Pouta	Pekka Pouta	13 August 2020	0.385
9	"An object in a balloon"	Juha Perälä	Jukka Hildén & Janne Kataja	20 August 2020	0.334
10	"Mystery points"	Hjallis Harkimo	Janne Kataja	27 August 2020	0.393

=== Season 2 (2021) ===
This is the second season of Suurmestari. The regular contestants of the season are Aku Hirviniemi, Kiti Kokkonen, Minka Kuustonen and Miika Nousiainen. The season was won by Minka Kuustonen.

No.	Title (in english)	Guest	Winner	Original release date	FIN viewers (millions)
11	"Surprise Pilvi"	Christoffer Strandberg	Christoffer Strandberg	27 March 2021	0.679
12	"Stop the pins from falling"	Kalle Lamberg	Miika Nousiainen	3 April 2021	0.520
13	"Collect sweat"	Mikko Töyssy	Mikko Töyssy	10 April 2021	0.590
14	"Make a reverse video"	Eija Vilpas	Minka Kuustonen	17 April 2021	0.521
15	"Don't blink"	Kirsi Alm-Siira	Kirsi Alm-Siira	24 April 2021	0.687
16	"No hands! (Note: The title (No hands!) is actually the official title of the episode in the finnish program info.)"	Joonas Nordman	Kiti Kokkonen	1 May 2021	0.607
17	"High splash"	Maria Veitola	Kiti Kokkonen	8 May 2021	0.509
18	"Create a domino effect"	Kari Aihinen	Kari Aihinen	15 May 2021	0.476
19	"Make a silhouette"	Veronica Verho	Veronica Verho	22 May 2021	0.531
20	"The strangest unifying factor"	Tuomas Kyrö	Minka Kuustonen	2 June 2021	0.499

=== Season 3 (2022) ===
The third Season was announced by MTV in October 2021. The recordings of ten episodes were held during November 2021. The regular contestants of the Season are Mikko Penttilä, Jenni Pääskysaari, Riku Rantala and Anna-Maija Tuokko. Season premiered on MTV in April 2022. The season was won by Riku Rantala with record-breaking 180 points. Mikko Penttilä finished second, Jenni Pääskysaari third and Anna-Maija Tuokko last place.

No.	Title (in english)	Guest	Winner	Original release date	FIN viewers (millions)
21	"Impress the Professor"	Pekka Strang	Riku Rantala	16 April 2022	0.371
22	"Hide three eggplants"	Vappu Pimiä	Vappu Pimiä	23 April 2022	0.368
23	"Order balloons"	Stig	Jenni Pääskysaari	30 April 2022	0.387
24	"Make a task"	Pyhimys	Riku Rantala	21 May 2022	0.287
25	"Shackle yourself"	Minna Haapkylä	Minna Haapkylä	27 May 2022	0.330
26	"Design an album cover"	Jarppi Leppälä	Anna-Maija Tuokko	4 June 2022	0.220
27	"A Gift for the Grand Master"	Anna Puu	Anna Puu	11 June 2022	0.209
28	"Transform into Pilvi"	Dennis Nylund	Dennis Nylund	18 June 2022	0.292
29	"Move the playhouse"	Erika Vikman	Mikko Penttilä	25 June 2022	0.163
30	"Sing the theme song"	Mikko Kuustonen	Mikko Penttilä & Riku Rantala	2 July 2022	0.226

=== Season 4 (2023) ===
The fourth Season was announced by MTV to start on 18 March 2023, with the regular contestants being Eija Vilpas, Fathi Ahmed, Kalle Lamberg and Pirjo Heikkilä. The season was won by Kalle Lamberg. Fathi Ahmed finished second, Pirjo Heikkilä third, and Eija Vilpas last place.

No.	Title (in english)	Guest	Winner	Original release date	FIN viewers (millions)
31	"Make an educational video"	Paleface	Paleface	18 March 2023	0.474
32	"Make a toy for a cute dog"	Erin	Kalle Lamberg	25 March 2023	0.354
33	"Get goosebumps"	Jukka Rasila	Kalle Lamberg	1 April 2023	0.369
34	"Excess weight in a suitcase"	Susani Mahadura	Fathi Ahmed	8 April 2023	0.283
35	"Make a karaoke video"	Timo Lavikainen	Pirjo Heikkilä	15 April 2023	0.338
36	"Brush Pilvi’s teeth"	Krisse Salminen	Fathi Ahmed	22 April 2023	0.363
37	"As You, I wouldn’t open.."	Helmi-Leena Nummela	Kalle Lamberg	29 April 2023	0.339
38	"Create an ASMR experience"	Miska Haakana	Eija Vilpas	6 May 2023	0.349
39	"Water for cubic meters"	Linda Wiklund	Fathi Ahmed	20 May 2023 (Note: This episode aired only on 20th May, 2023, as the Men's Ice Hockey Championships 2023 began the week before, and Finland played their opening game.)	<0.245
40	"A silent birdhouse"	Ali Jahangiri	Kalle Lamberg	26 May 2023	0.281

=== Season 5 (2024) ===
The fifth season of Suurmestari premiered in March 2024, and the studio recordings were held in November 2023. The regular panelists for this season are Pirjo Lonka, Eero Ritala, Pamela Tola and Joonas Nordman.

No.	Title (in english)	Guest	Winner	Original release date	FIN viewers (millions)
41	"Throw something in the trash can"	Ville Myllyrinne	Pirjo Lonka	16 March 2024	0.567
42	"Keep talking as long as possible"	Johanna Puhakka	Eero Ritala	23 March 2024	0.457
43	"Throw water as far as possible"	Olga Temonen	Pamela Tola	30 March 2024	0.386
44	"Complete the task. This isn't your task."	Arman Alizad	Joonas Nordman	6 April 2024	0.343
45	"Duck in to the pool"	Elina Gustafsson	Pamela Tola & Eero Ritala	13 April 2024	0.389
46	"Biggest thing through a doughnut"	Sointu Borg	Pirjo Lonka	20 April 2024	0.377
47	"Create a cliffhanger (Note: In this episode, there was the first ever team task in the show's history; Tola and Ritala were a pair, and Lonka, Nordman and guest Ernest Lawson formed a trio. Guest appearance in this task was made by Esko Kovero.)"	Ernest Lawson	Pamela Tola	27 April 2024	0.417
48	"Take a mannequin to an adventure"	Heikki Ranta	Joonas Nordman	4 May 2024	0.351
49	"Eggs from the top of a pole"	Niko Saarinen	Niko Saarinen	11 May 2024	0.304
50	"Create a superhero"	J. Kokander & M. Penttilä (Note: Due to guest contestant Jenni Kokander's illness during the studio filmings, former contestant Mikko Penttilä serves as the studio guest for her.)	Eero Ritala	18 May 2024	0.292
51	"Make a new friend"	Viivi Pumpanen	Pirjo Lonka & Pamela Tola	1 June 2024	0.256
52	"Convince the Grand Master"	Elias Salonen	Joonas Nordman	8 June 2024	0.153

=== Juniori Suurmestari (2024) ===
The filming of the Junior-version took place in summer 2024, and was aired at the end of the same year.

=== Season 6 (2025) ===
The sixth season of Suurmestari began airing on the 27th of April 2025. The regular panelists for this season are Elias Salonen, Kari Hietalahti, Iina Kuustonen and Sonja Kailassaari.

No.	Title (in english)	Guest	Winner	Original release date	FIN viewers (millions)
53	"Fox in the bowl"	Ville-Petteri Galle	Ville-Petteri Galle	27 April 2025	0.329
54	"Change the room in the dark"	Juuso ”Köpi” Kallio	Juuso ”Köpi” Kallio	4 May 2025	0.304
55	"Sort the chocolates correctly"	Lina Schiffer	Iina Kuustonen	11 May 2025	0.307
56	"Find the squirrel"	Linnea Leino	Kari Hietalahti	18 May 2025	0.233
57	"Fairy Godmother"	Karoliina Tuominen	Sonja Kailassaari & Karoliina Tuominen	1 June 2025	0.312
58	"Medium-sized circle"	Lakko	Elias Salonen	8 June 2025	0.306
59	"Synchronised presentation"	Cristal Snow	Sonja Kailassaari	15 June 2025	0.236
60	"Find a mandarin"	Jarkko Niemi & Sointu Borg (Note: Sointu Borg serves as the studio guest for Jarkko Niemi in this episode.)	Elias Salonen	22 June 2025	0.259
61	"Pick something up and carry it far away"	Oona Kare	Sonja Kailassaari	29 June 2025	0.232
62	"Crazy mocktail"	Katja Ståhl	Katja Ståhl	6 July 2025	0.220

== Awards and nominations ==
Award	Year	Category	Nominated	Result
Golden Venla (Note: The awards are for the previous year, not on the current year. The year announced on the table is the Year of the Season which was rewarded.)	2020	Best Game Show	Suurmestari	Won
Golden Venla	2021	Best Game Show	Suurmestari	Won
Golden Venla	2022	Best Game Show	Suurmestari	Won
Golden Venla	2023	Best Game Show	Suurmestari	Won
Golden Venla	2024	Best Game Show	Suurmestari	Won
