= Multiplicity =

Multiplicity may refer to:

== Arts and entertainment ==
- Multiplicity (film), a 1996 comedy film starring Michael Keaton
- Multiplicity (album), 2005 studio album by Dave Weckl

== Science ==
- Multiplicity (chemistry), multiplicity in quantum chemistry is a function of angular spin momentum
- Multiplicity (informatics), a type of relationship in class diagrams for Unified Modeling Language used in software engineering
- Multiplicity (mathematics), the number of times an element is repeated in a multiset
- Multiplicity (software), a software application which allows a user to control two or more computers from one mouse and keyboard
- Multiplicity (statistical mechanics), the number of microstates corresponding to a particular macrostate in a thermodynamic system, symbolized by the Greek letter Ω
- Dissociative identity disorder, psychological condition formerly called "multiple personality disorder" where a person exhibits multiple, distinct overlapping identities
- Statistical multiplicity, also known as the problem of multiple comparisons

== Other ==
- Multiplicity (Christianity)
- Multiplicity (philosophy), a philosophical concept
- Plural identity, an identity for people who are phenomenologically multiple (having multiple identities within one body)
