= Kongen befaler =

Norwegian TV show

- Also known as: The King Commands
- Genre: Comedy, panel game
- Created by: Alex Horne
- Presented by: Atle Antonsen; Bård Ylvisåker
- Starring: Olli Wermskog (assistant)
- Theme music composer: The Horne Section
- Country of origin: Norway
- Original language: Norwegian
- No. of series: 9
- No. of episodes: 90

Production
- Running time: 43 minutes
- Production company: Nordisk Banijay

Original release
- Network: TVNorge, discovery+
- Release: 17 October 2019 – present

Related
- Taskmaster (British TV series)

Kongen befaler is a Norwegian comedy programme based on the British show Taskmaster. It has been broadcast on TVNorge and discovery+ since 2019. The show features five fixed panelists per series who all complete tasks, judged by Atle Antonsen from Series 1–6, Bård Ylvisåker for Series 7, then again by Atle Antonsen from Series 8 onwards, and assisted by Olli Wermskog.

The format for the show was created by British comedian Alex Horne during the Edinburgh Festival Fringe in 2010, and was subsequently developed into a successful UK television show in 2015. Kongen befaler translates as "the king commands" and is the Norwegian name of the game Simon Says.

One major difference in this version is that tiebreaker tasks are not featured, so if there is a tie for first place after the live task, they all win the episode, and share the prize pot.

The studio sections are recorded in Drammens Teater, a theatre in Drammen, 40 km from Oslo.

== Episodes ==
=== Series 1 (2019) ===
The first series was aired in 2019 on TVNorge, between 17 October and 19 December. Vegard Ylvisåker, Maria Stavang, Calle Hellevang-Larsen, Bård Ylvisåker and Siri Kristiansen were participants. The winner of the season was Vegard Ylvisåker.

No.	Title	English translation	Winner	Original release date
1	"Kongen Befaler"	The King Commands	Vegard Ylvisåker	17 October 2019
2	"Gni det inn, folk på trikken"	Rub it in, people on the tram	Maria Stavang	28 October 2019
3	"Det er så deilig å være dum"	It's so nice to be stupid	Vegard Ylvisåker	31 October 2019
4	"Palvaaksii Malaksij"	Finnish-sounding gibberish	Vegard Ylvisåker	7 November 2019
5	"Hva gjorde de før gaffateip?"	What did they do before duct tape?	Bård Ylvisåker	14 November 2019
6	"Barn liker vold"	Children like violence	Calle Hellevang-Larsen	21 November 2019
7	"Nå er det litt Titanic-stemning her"	There's a bit of a Titanic vibe here now	Vegard Ylvisåker	28 November 2019
8	"Vi skal fremdeles holde oss i rektum"	We shall still remain in the rectum	Siri Kristiansen	5 December 2019
9	"Elendig levert, Minni Mus!"	Terribly done, Minnie Mouse!	Calle Hellevang-Larsen	12 December 2019
10	"Åja, Sudan ligger der?"	Oh, that's where Sudan is?	Calle Hellevang-Larsen	19 December 2019

=== Series 2 (2020) ===
The second series was aired in 2020 between 24 September and 16 November. The contestants were Maria Stavang, Calle Hellevang-Larsen, Jon Almaas, Mia Hundvin and Magnus Devold. The winner of the season was Calle Hellevang-Larsen.

No.	Title	English translation	Winner(s)	Original release date
1	"Makaroni og elg"	Macaroni and elk	Calle Hellevang-Larsen	24 September 2020
2	"Tetningslistlakris"	Sealing strip licorice	Calle Hellevang-Larsen	1 October 2020
3	"Tauet sier takk"	The rope says thank you	Jon Almaas & Mia Hundvin	8 October 2020
4	"Det var noe rart med det flyet her"	There's something strange about this plane	Mia Hundvin	15 October 2020
5	"Tenke som en lang mann"	Think like a tall man	Mia Hundvin	22 October 2020
6	"Toast-in-one"	Toast-in-one	Calle Hellevang-Larsen	29 October 2020
7	"Skriv hårbørste"	Write hairbrush	Mia Hundvin	5 November 2020
8	"Kilpisjärvi, har du vært der?"	Kilpisjärvi, have you been there?	Jon Almaas	12 November 2020
9	"Finsk suring"	The Sulky Finn	Magnus Devold & Calle Hellevang-Larsen	19 November 2020
10	"Lille Snåsagutten"	Little Snåsa Boy	Calle Hellevang-Larsen	26 November 2020

=== Series 3 (2021) ===
The third series was aired in 2021 between 4 February and 25 March. The contestants were Egil Hegerberg, Trond Fausa Aurvåg, Linn Skåber, Jenny Skavlan and Erik Follestad. Jenny Skavlan was this season's winner.

No.	Title	English translation	Winner(s)	Original release date
1	"Langrennslys"	Cross-country skiing light	Trond Fausa Aurvåg	4 February 2021
2	"Absolutt gefyll"	Absolute filling	Linn Skåber	11 February 2021
3	"Knipestag"	made-up word	Egil Hegerberg	18 February 2021
4	"Late-Linn"	Lazy Linn	Trond Fausa Aurvåg & Jenny Skavlan	25 February 2021
5	"Dominohistorier"	Domino stories	Erik Follestad	4 March 2021
6	"Den ananasen, det stedet!"	That pineapple, that place!	Trond Fausa Aurvåg	11 March 2021
7	"Havets frukt"	The fruit of the sea	Jenny Skavlan	18 March 2021
8	"Les brevet 100 ganger"	Read the letter 100 times	Jenny Skavlan & Linn Skåber	25 March 2021

=== Series 4 (2021) ===
The fourth series was aired in 2021 between 23 September and 9 December. The contestants were Amir Asgharnejad, Ida Fladen, Einar Tørnquist, Steinar Sagen and Solveig Kloppen. The winner of the season was Einar Tørnquist.

No.	Title	English translation	Winner(s)	Original release date
1	"Underhold oss, spis kattemat"	Entertain us, eat cat food	Amir Asgharnejad	23 September 2021
2	"Drittoppgave! Hadet"	Shit task! Goodbye	Einar Tørnquist	23 September 2021
3	"Dobbelt så stor som senga"	Twice as big as the bed	Ida Fladen	30 September 2021
4	"Norsk bæsjeforening"	Norwegian pooping association	Steinar Sagen	7 October 2021
5	"Eselet som skyter gull ut av rompa"	The donkey that shoots gold out of its butt	Solveig Kloppen	14 October 2021
6	"Finske fingre"	Finnish fingers	Steinar Sagen	21 October 2021
7	"Selv mugg ligger dårlig an"	Even mold is nothing	Amir Asgharnejad	28 October 2021
8	"Skjønte de andre dette her?"	Did the others understand this?	Ida Fladen	4 November 2021
9	"Tuja Be Continued"	Thuja Be Continued	Einar Tørnquist	11 November 2021
10	"Hei hei mel"	Hello flour	Ida Fladen	18 November 2021
11	"Nei nei, da dør jeg jo"	No no, then I'll die	Amir Asgharnejad & Ida Fladen	25 November 2021
12	"Nå blir jeg lurt igjen"	Now I'm being tricked again	Amir Asgharnejad	2 December 2021

=== Series 5 (2022) ===
The fifth series was aired in 2022 between 24 February and 28 April. The contestants were Harald Eia, Janne Formoe, Henrik Elvestad, Kristine Grændsen and Martin Lepperød. The season was won by Harald Eia.

No.	Title	English translation	Winner(s)	Original release date
1	"Kult med Kongen Befaler da…"	Cool with Kongen befaler, then…	Henrik Elvestad	24 February 2022
2	"Overraskende vondt"	Surprisingly painful	Kristine Grændsen	24 February 2022
3	"Dovregol"	portmanteau of two mountainous municipalities	Harald Eia & Henrik Elvestad	3 March 2022
4	"Noe bombete"	Something bomb-y	Kristine Grændsen	10 March 2022
5	"Uppblåsbar fåtölj"	Inflatable armchair (in Swedish)	Harald Eia & Janne Formoe	17 March 2022
6	"Ta deg en slurk spett"	Take a sip of crowbar	Kristine Grændsen	24 March 2022
7	"MILF'en med Jesus i hjertet"	The MILF with Jesus in her heart	Henrik Elvestad	31 March 2022
8	"Beklager, Atle"	Sorry, Atle	Martin Lepperød	7 April 2022
9	"Hei, jeg kommer fra kommunen"	Hi, I'm from the municipality	Harald Eia	21 April 2022
10	"Trygg, lat, kokko og gærn"	Safe, lazy, eccentric and crazy	Harald Eia	28 April 2022

=== Series 6 (2022) ===
The sixth series was aired in 2022 between 15 September and 20 November. The contestants were Live Nelvik, Espen Eckbo, Martha Leivestad, Kristoffer Olsen, and Henriette Steenstrup. The series was won by Kristoffer Olsen.

No.	Title	English translation	Winner(s)	Original release date
1	"Den nye kokken"	The new cook	Kristoffer Olsen	15 September 2022
2	"Ka sjuk porno e detta?"	What kind of sick porn is this?	Live Nelvik	22 September 2022
3	"Ååh er jeg her?!"	Oh am I here?!	Kristoffer Olsen	29 September 2022
4	"Porselen?"	Porcelain?	Henriette Steenstrup	6 October 2022
5	"Det er tut, og så er det sånn"	It's a tube, and then it goes like this	Espen Eckbo	13 October 2022
6	"Massiv selvsensur"	Massive self-censorship	Kristoffer Olsen	20 October 2022
7	"Tarm, ugle, vesen, wolf"	Intestine, owl, creature, wolf	Martha Leivestad	27 October 2022
8	"Jeg trodde jeg likte Espen Eckbo"	I thought I liked Espen Eckbo	Live Nelvik	3 November 2022
9	"Jeg går for gay"	I'll go for gay	Kristoffer Olsen	3 November 2022
10	"Skal jeg fange en fugl, er det det?"	Should I catch a bird, is that it?	Martha Leivestad	17 November 2022

=== Series 7 (2023) ===
The seventh series started airing 26 January 2023 and was presented by Bård Ylvisåker, who also participated in Series 1. The contestants were Leo Ajkic, Karin Klouman, Lars Berrum, Hani Hussein and Vidar Magnussen, and the series was won by Magnussen.

No.	Title	English translation	Winner(s)	Original release date
1	"Eg er ikkje der, eg er her!"	I'm not there, I'm here!	Leo Ajkic & Vidar Magnussen	26 January 2023
2	"Jeg er genial"	I'm a genius	Leo Ajkic & Vidar Magnussen	2 February 2023
3	"En underholdningsfirkant"	An entertainment square	Vidar Magnussen	9 February 2023
4	"Jeg har ikke lappen, gjør det noe?"	I don't have a license, does that matter?	Karin Klouman	16 February 2023
5	"Depresjonsnissen"	The depression gnome	Leo Ajkic & Karin Klouman	23 February 2023
6	"Fakk slag, mann"	Fuck strikes, man	Leo Ajkic	2 March 2023
7	"Vi får høre hva fagforeningen sier"	We'll hear what the union says	Vidar Magnussen	9 March 2023
8	"You had me at skolebolle"	You had me at school bun	Hani Hussein	16 March 2023
9	"Mångt gong"	corruption of mange ganger (many times)	Karin Klouman & Vidar Magnussen	23 March 2023
10	"Eg sager en ape"	I'm sawing a monkey	Hani Hussein	30 March 2023

=== Series 8 (2023) ===
The eighth series started airing 14 September 2023. The contestants were Marte Stokstad, Christian Skolmen, Stian Blipp, Tete Lidbom and Tuva Billing, and the series was won by Lidbom.

No.	Title	English translation	Winner(s)	Original release date
1	"Klar, ferdig, kjøtt"	Ready, set, meat	Christian Skolmen	14 September 2023
2	"Mer opplysning enn underholdning"	More enlightenment than entertainment	Marte Stokstad	21 September 2023
3	"Blekket på finger'n ahh"	The ink on my finger, ahh	Tuva Billing	28 September 2023
4	"Den går i ræven"	It goes in the ass	Stian Blipp	5 October 2023
5	"Verdensrekord"	World record	Tete Lidbom	12 October 2023
6	"Min første piknik"	My first picnic	Tuva Billing	19 October 2023
7	"Det er tusen perler i glasset"	There are a thousand beads in the glass	Stian Blipp	26 October 2023
8	"Mer hudrester enn caps"	More skin residue than cap	Tete Lidbom	2 November 2023
9	"Hvem er Mats?"	Who is Mats?	Stian Blipp	9 November 2023
10	"Imponerende snurrebass"	Impressive spinning top	Tete Lidbom & Tuva Billing	16 November 2023

=== Series 9 (2024) ===
The ninth series started airing 18 January 2024. The contestants were Ingrid Gjessing Linhave, Ingar Helge Gimle, Nora Svenningsen, Petter Schjerven and Jonis Josef. The series was won by Schjerven.

No.	Title	English translation	Winner(s)	Original release date
1	"Kaktus i panna"	Cactus in the forehead	Petter Schjerven	18 January 2024
2	"Ballefrans!"	Bollocks!	Ingrid Gjessing Linhave	25 January 2024
3	"Motsatt av Mensa"	Opposite of Mensa	Petter Schjerven	1 February 2024
4	"Bare gønn på"	Full speed ahead	Petter Schjerven	8 February 2024
5	"Smaker sånn maur"	Tastes like ants	Petter Schjerven & Ingrid Gjessing Linhave	15 February 2024
6	"Pappa er her!"	Daddy's here!	Jonis Josef & Ingar Helge Gimle	22 February 2024
7	"Ti push-ups er for mye"	Ten push-ups is too many	Petter Schjerven & Ingrid Gjessing Linhave	29 February 2024
8	"Evig eies kun det tapte"	Only the lost is eternally owned	Nora Svenningsen	7 March 2024
9	"Jeg må bare pisse"	I just have to piss	Nora Svenningsen	14 March 2024
10	"Jeg går for null!"	I'll go for zero!	Ingar Helge Gimle	21 March 2024

=== Series 10 (2024) ===
The tenth series started airing 19 September 2024. The contestants were Aksel Hennie, Bjarte Tjøstheim, Else Kåss Furuseth, Erik Solbakken & Tara Lina Shahin. The series was won by Hennie.

No.	Title	English translation	Winner(s)	Original release date
1	"Den kan jeg ete"	I can eat that	Aksel Hennie	19 September 2024
2	"Da må jo dette være chardonnay"	Then this must be chardonnay	Aksel Hennie	26 September 2024
3	"15 sekunder frijazz"	15 seconds of free jazz	Erik Solbakken	3 October 2024
4	"Olli, kjør konfetti!"	Olli, do the confetti!	Tara Lina Shahin	10 October 2024
5	"Den onde lille fetteren"	The evil little cousin	Erik Solbakken	17 October 2024
6	"Ball, ball, der, bygd opp"	Ball, ball, there, built up	Aksel Hennie	24 October 2024
7	"Vært fir mye med Staysman"	Been spending too much time with Staysman	Else Kåss Furuseth	31 October 2024
8	"Alt er kavring"	Everything is rusk	Aksel Hennie	7 November 2024
9	"Slipp vateret fri"	Release the spirit level	Erik Solbakken & Aksel Hennie	14 November 2024
10	"Det bakre eggeglasset"	The rear egg cup	Aksel Hennie	21 November 2024

=== Series 11 (2025) ===
The eleventh series started airing 6 February 2025. The contestants were Snorre Monsson, Amalie Stuve, Anne Marit Jacobsen, Abubakar Hussain & Alex Rosén. The series was won by Monsson.

No.	Title	English translation	Winner(s)	Original release date
1	"Umulig å puste i brød"	Impossible to breathe in bread	Snorre Monsson	6 February 2025
2	"Pikk, tykk, stikk"	Dick, thick, prick	Alex Rosén	13 February 2025
3	"Hakk tua"	Hawk tuah	Snorre Monsson	20 February 2025
4	"Er det Jan Eggum?"	Is it Jan Eggum?	Amalie Stuve	27 February 2025
5	"Kløftas Robin Hood"	Kløfta's Robin Hood	Amalie Stuve	6 March 2025
6	"Abus 100 %-lotteriet"	Abu's 100% lottery	Anne Marit Jacobsen & Abubakar Hussain	13 March 2025
7	"Gøy koffert"	Fun suitcase	Snorre Monsson	20 March 2025
8	"Har du på deg hundehalsbånd?"	Are you wearing a dog collar?	Snorre Monsson	27 March 2025
9	"Er du naken, tut tre ganger"	If you're naked, honk three times	Akubakar Hussain & Alex Rosén	3 April 2025
10	"Finale"	Finale	Abubakar Hussain	10 April 2025

=== Series 12 (2025) ===
The twelfth series started airing 11 September 2025. The contestants were Pernille Sørensen, Henrik Fladseth, Ina Svenningdal, Thomas Numme & Ole Henry Snildalsli. The series was won by Svenningdal.

No.	Title	English translation	Winner(s)	Original release date
1	"Tynnvaffel går jeg for"	I'm going for a thin waffle	Henrik Fladseth	11 September 2025
2	"Ja, det blir rips i nesa"	Yeah, it'll be redcurrants in the nose	Ole Henry Snildalsli	18 September 2025
3	"Er dette bra nok?"	Is this good enough?	Pernille Sørensen	25 September 2025
4	"Masse masse blod"	Lots and lots of blood	Ina Svenningdal	2 October 2025
5	"Framtungt tårn"	Forward-heavy tower	Henrik Fladseth	9 October 2025
6	"Men jeg men men den er vel er den ja"	But I but yeah well it's that one then	Ole Henry Snildalsli	16 October 2025
7	"Katt som klemmes"	Cat being squeezed	Thomas Numme	23 October 2025
8	"Ta tilbake sønda’n"	Take back the Sunday	Ina Svenningdal	30 October 2025
9	"Kaktus, au-au-au-au!"	Cactus, ow-ow-ow-ow!	Henrik Fladseth	6 November 2025
10	"Du er så teit, Olli!"	You are so daft, Olli!	Thomas Numme	13 November 2025
