= Direktor svemira =

- Genre: Game show
- Based on: Taskmaster by Alex Horne
- Presented by: Ivan Šarić; Luka Petrušić
- Country of origin: Croatia
- Original language: Croatian
- No. of seasons: 2
- No. of episodes: 20

Production
- Running time: 60 minutes

Original release
- Network: RTL
- Release: 24 November 2021 – 10 August 2026

Direktor svemira ("The Director of the Universe") is a Croatian game show television series based on the British format of Taskmaster. The first season aired from 24 November to 16 December 2021 on RTL. The first season was won by Ana Begić Tahiri.

The second season was confirmed in October 2022; however, RTL did not release it at the time for unknown reasons. The second season eventually premiered on 22 July 2026.

== Format ==
A group of contestants compete against each other by completing tasks assigned to them. The tasks are of a comedic nature such as 'Find an eggplant', 'Paint a horse while riding a horse', 'Find out information from Hungarians', 'Don't blink', or 'Sing a serenade.' The contestant that accumulated the most points at the end of the season is declared the winner.

== Series overview ==
Season	Episodes	Originally released	
Season	Episodes	First released	Last released
1	10	24 November 2021	16 December 2021
2	10	22 July 2026	10 August 2026

== Contestants ==
Contestants on Direktor svemira season 1 and their final scores
Contestant	Notability	Result	Ref.
Ana Begić Tahiri	Actress	Winner; 179 points	
Igor Drljo	Stand-up comedian	175 points	
Lidija Bačić	Singer	165 points	
Enio Meštrović Ričard	Political activist	161 points	
Ante Travizi	Stand-up comedian	160 points	
