= Task =

Task may refer to:

- Task (computing), a unit of execution or a unit of work
- Task (language instruction) refers to a certain type of activity used in language instructional design
- Task (project management), an activity that needs to be accomplished within a defined period of time
- Task (teaching style)
- TASK party, a series of improvisational participatory art-related events organized by artist Oliver Herring
- Two-pore-domain potassium channel, a family of potassium ion channels
- Task (TV series), a 2025 American crime drama

== See also ==
- The Task (disambiguation)
- Task force (disambiguation)
- Task switching (disambiguation)
