= Taskmaster (TV series) =

British comedy panel game show

- Genre: Comedy; Panel game
- Created by: Alex Horne
- Directed by: Andy Devonshire
- Presented by: Greg Davies; Alex Horne
- Theme music composer: The Horne Section
- Composers: Dru Masters; Tom Howe
- Country of origin: United Kingdom
- Original language: English
- No. of series: 22
- No. of episodes: 214 (list of episodes)

Production
- Executive producers: Richard Allen-Turner; James Taylor; Jon Thoday; Rob Aslett; Andy Devonshire; Alex Horne
- Producer: Andy Cartwright
- Production locations: Clapham Grand (series 1); Fountain Studios (series 2–3); Pinewood Studios (series 4–20); Television Centre (series 21–present)
- Editors: Thomas Perrett; Rebecca Bowker; Hunter Allen
- Running time: 44–47 minutes
- Production company: Avalon Television

Original release
- Network: Dave
- Release: 28 July 2015 – 6 November 2019
- Network: Channel 4
- Release: 15 October 2020 – present

Related
- Bäst i test; Dicho y hecho; Direktor svemira; Taskmaster (American TV series); Stormester; Kongen befaler; Suurmestari; Taskmaster NL; Taskmaster New Zealand; Le maître du jeu; Taskmaster Australia; Taskmaster Polska

Taskmaster

YouTube information
- Channel: Taskmaster
- Years active: 2019–present
- Genres: Entertainment; Comedy
- Subscribers: 2.39 million
- Views: 1.8 billion
- Last updated: 9 November 2026

Taskmaster (also known internationally as Taskmaster UK) is a British comedy panel game show created by comedian Alex Horne. It is presented by Greg Davies, as the Taskmaster, and Horne, as the Taskmaster's assistant. In each series of the programme, a group of five celebrities (mainly comedians) attempt to complete a series of challenges, referred to as "tasks". The Taskmaster then reviews the contestants' attempts and awards points based on performance, interpretation or other arbitrary, comedic factors. A winner is determined in each episode and for the series overall.

The concept for the programme was first created by Horne for the Edinburgh Festival Fringe in 2010; he later secured a deal with Dave to adapt it for television with the first episode premiering in 2015. After the ninth series in 2019, the programme was acquired by Channel 4. The programme has completed 22 series, as well as five Champion of Champions episodes (Note: A two-parter in 2017, followed by one-off episodes in 2022, 2024, and 2025.) and seven New Year Treat episodes as of November 2026, (Note: One-off episodes in 2021, 2022, 2023, January 2024, and December 2024, followed by a two-parter in 2026.) and is commissioned to continue up to series 27 in 2029 as well as more Champion of Champions and New Year Treat episodes.

Taskmaster's success on British television led to international versions in Australia, Belgium, Croatia, Denmark, Estonia, Finland, Iceland, Netherlands, New Zealand, Norway, Poland, Portugal, Canada (Quebec), Sweden, Spain and the United States, the last of which featured Horne reprising his role as the Taskmaster's assistant.

The show's 22nd series, featuring Chloe Petts, Isy Suttie, Matt Lucas, Nina Conti, and Richard Ayoade, aired from September to November 2026.

A British spin-off series, Junior Taskmaster, with children as competitors, aired on Channel 4 in November and December 2024, with Rose Matafeo as Taskmaster and Mike Wozniak as the assistant (both former contestants on Taskmaster). Additionally, a tie-in board game, two books, and a VR game have been released, as well as a live experience. During the COVID-19 pandemic, Horne hosted #HomeTasking, a series of tasks for people to film in their own homes; for each task, a montage of attempts was posted on YouTube that featured Davies awarding points to his favourite entries.

== History ==
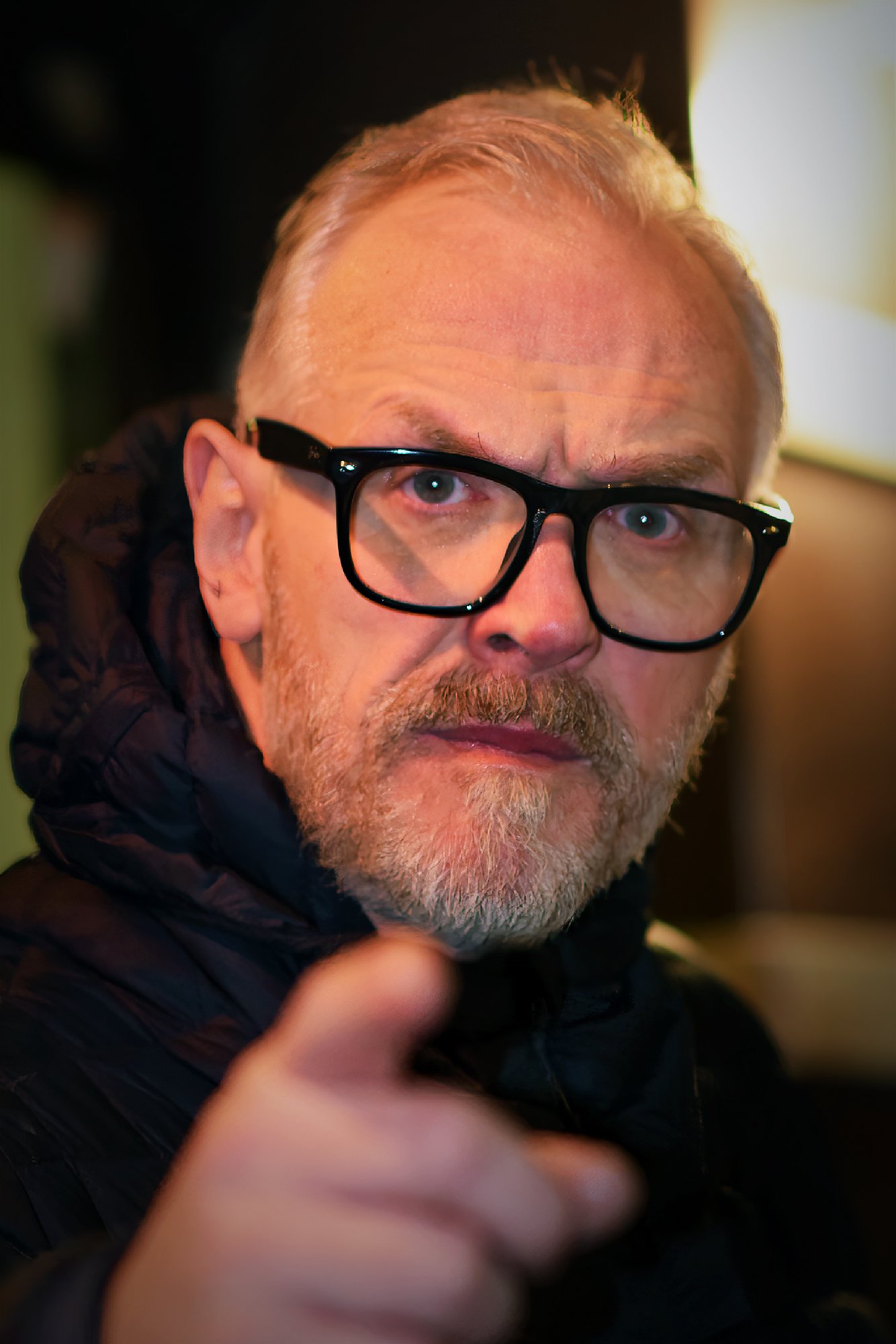
Greg Davies, the titular "Taskmaster", pictured in 2024.

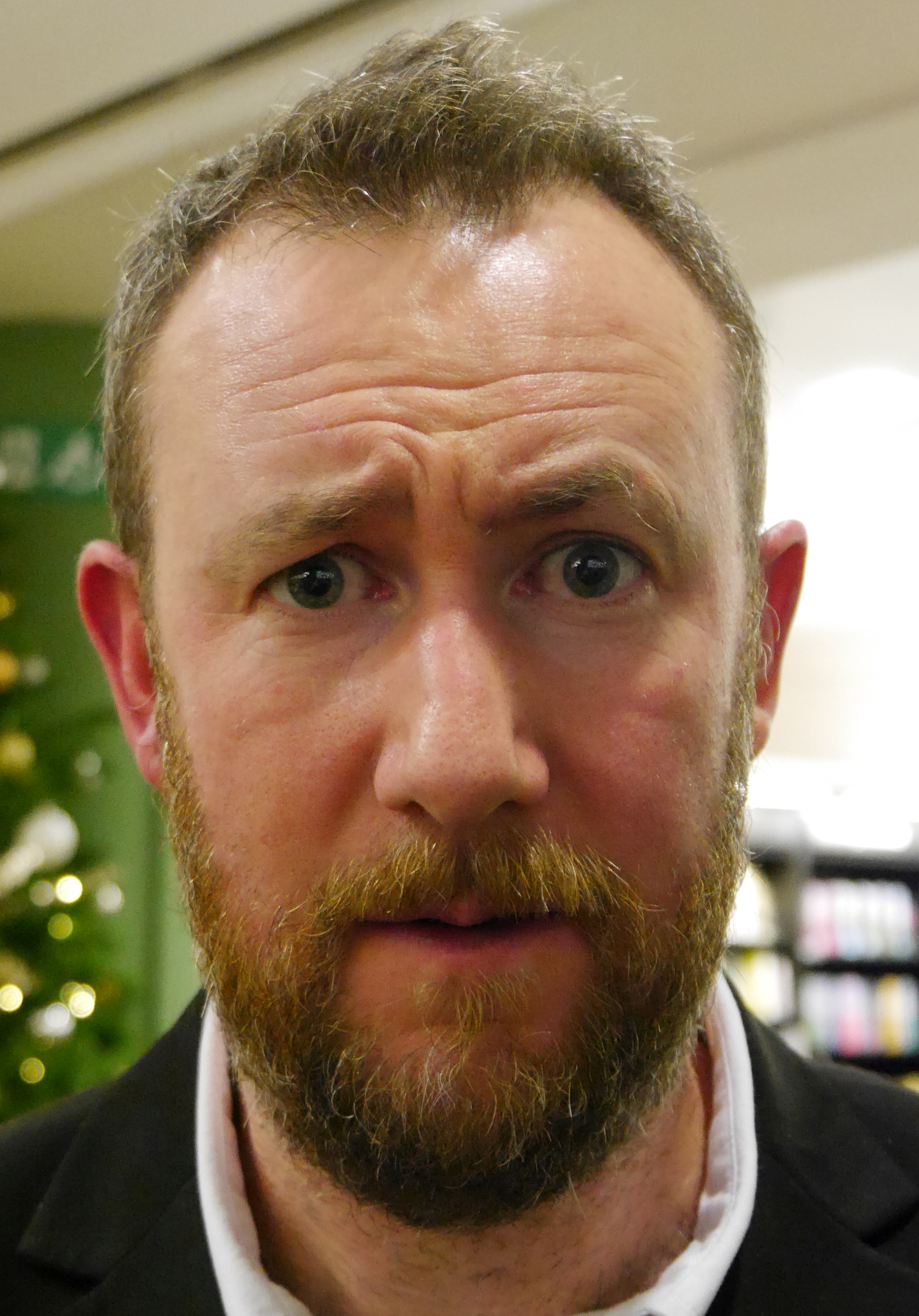
Taskmaster creator Alex Horne pictured in 2018.

=== Origin ===
Taskmaster was created by comedian Alex Horne, whose idea was inspired by The Crystal Maze, his work on Big Brother, and his envy of his close friend Tim Key winning the Edinburgh Comedy Award in 2009. The original concept of the programme took place over the course of two years.

=== 2010 and 2011 Fringe shows ===
Starting in September 2009, Horne sent 20 comedians monthly tasks by email over the course of a year. He then presented their efforts as part of a two-hour show at the 2010 Edinburgh Festival Fringe titled The Task Master, which focused on demonstrating the differing attempts by the contestants before revealing who won based on their performances.

The original 20 contestants in the 2010 Fringe show were: Dan Atkinson, Tom Basden, Jarred Christmas, James Dowdeswell, Rick Edwards, Tim FitzHigham, Stuart Goldsmith, Steve Hall, Tim Key, Lloyd Langford, Josie Long, Guy Morgan, Al Pitcher, Mark Olver, Mark Watson, Henning Wehn, Joe Wilkinson, Lloyd Woolf, Mike Wozniak, and Tom Wrigglesworth.

Wozniak was announced as the winner of The Task Master. Six participants in the original Edinburgh show have gone on to appear in a televised version of Taskmaster as of 2024: Key in series 1; Wilkinson in series 2; Watson in series 5; Wozniak in series 11 and as the assistant on Junior Taskmaster; Langford in series 2 of the Australian version; and Pitcher as a guest contestant in series 2 of the Swedish version.

For the 2011 Edinburgh Festival Fringe, Horne conducted another stage show titled Taskmaster II at the Gilded Balloon with a similar format. This time there were ten contestants: nine comedians returning from the previous year (Atkinson, Wehn, Wilkinson, Long, Langford, Watson, Hall, Goldsmith, and Key), and critic Bruce Dessau. Josie Long was announced as the winner of Taskmaster II.

Both stage shows proved a success with their audiences, leading Horne to recruit the production company Avalon (which was also his agency at the time) to help produce an adaptation of his concept for television, before pitching his idea to several broadcasters. Channel 4 reportedly paid for the production of a pilot episode, marking the first use of the house in Chiswick which became the Taskmaster House, but chose not to commission it at the time.

=== Broadcast history ===
==== Dave ====
British television channel Dave took interest in the idea and bought the rights to it, with comedian Greg Davies recruited to help present the programme alongside Horne. However, the channel's Deputy Director of Commissioning at the time, Hilary Rosen, was concerned with the structure of the show. Horne assured Rosen that the programme was not like a traditional panel show but "more like a sitcom", to account for the involvement of the same group of contestants who would appear across a series. Another problem with the format of Horne's concept was that shooting a traditional pilot became implausible; however, the aspects of the show filmed before a studio audience were tested in a pilot.

A series of six hour-long episodes was commissioned by Dave in September 2014 with Davies and Horne attached, initially with the episodes intended to be shown in any order. Rosen later determined the show should be arranged in an order, pointing out that "this was a show you record and transmit in the same order". In February 2015, the first cast of five contestants for the first series was announced, and the studio-based segments of the programme — where footage of the contestants' attempts at completing tasks at the Taskmaster House was screened, and prize tasks and live tasks were conducted, in front of a studio audience — began filming. The involvement of veteran comedian Frank Skinner, who agreed to join after meeting Horne for lunch, helped to entice the other contestants to take part in the programme.

The first series, which started airing in July 2015, proved a success; an additional eight series were commissioned on Dave, which aired until November 2019.

==== Channel 4 ====
After the ninth series, Channel 4 had secured the rights to the programme, repeatedly commissioning it for 18 series up to the 27th series in 2029. Filming for the 22nd series had almost wrapped by March 2026.

Channel 4 also announced a spin-off called Junior Taskmaster with contestants aged between 9 and 11, consisting of eight episodes with 9th-series contestant Rose Matafeo as the Taskmaster and 11th-series contestant Mike Wozniak as her assistant, which aired between November and December 2024. Junior Taskmaster follows similar children-oriented spin-off programmes on Channel 4 such as Junior Bake Off and Teen First Dates. Another spin-off of Taskmaster, titled Foodmaster, is centred around food. Former contestant Ed Gamble hosted a non-broadcast pilot in July 2023.

== Tasks ==
The Taskmaster house, where much of the series is recorded

Taskmaster is a comedic game show, in which a group of five contestants—mainly comedians, but sometimes including other well-known television personalities—compete against each other by completing tasks assigned to them. In each episode, contestants are shown tackling a series of tasks, supervised and sometimes assisted by Horne. Davies then judges each contestant's performance in each task to determine how many points they receive, generally ranking them from one to five points. The contestant with the highest score in each episode wins a collection of prizes submitted by the contestants themselves as one of the tasks; the one with the highest cumulative score at the end of a series wins a trophy. In the main series, the trophy is a golden bust of Davies.

Tasks are typically given to the contestants by Horne in his role as the Taskmaster's assistant, who hands them a tri-folded page sealed with red wax and the "TM" branding. The contestants must read the task out loud. Tasks given to contestants range from simple physical challenges, such as "eat as much watermelon as you can in one minute", to more complex or artistic tasks, such as "make a stop-motion video featuring a potato". Some tasks may consist of multiple stages or mini-tasks. In some cases, contestants conduct tasks as a team with one or two other contestants; in most such cases, all members of a team receive the same score. To complete tasks, contestants often have to apply a level of logic, creativity, or lateral thinking in order to achieve the end goal. Contestants can be disqualified and awarded no points for a task if they fail to achieve the task's objective, inadvertently break one of the task's rules, or cheat. Conversely, they can be given bonus points, either at Davies's discretion or based on criteria described in a task's instructions. Occasionally, prank tasks are given to one contestant alone, who is led to believe the others are performing the same task; Davies may award bonus points for these. Tasks are mostly pre-recorded months in advance and then screened in-studio with the contestants and presenters present, during which Davies assigns scores.

Two tasks are usually conducted during studio segments: an introductory Prize task, in which each contestant supplies an object they possess that conforms to a set theme, all of which will be awarded to the winner of the episode; and a final "Live" task, which the contestants perform onstage in the studio. In the event of a tie in the top score at the end of the episode or series, either a pre-recorded tiebreaker task between the tied contestants is shown, or a quick live task is performed to determine the winner.

== Task locations ==
Most tasks are conducted in or around the Taskmaster house, a three-room former groundskeepers' cottage located on the outskirts of a golf course in Dukes Meadows, Chiswick. Each series is assigned a theme that influences the design of the house, most notably the portrait of Greg Davies in the living room, as well as the music that plays during tasks. Themes for various series have included Japanese, western, art deco, Victorian, and steampunk.

Other pre-recorded tasks are filmed at a specific location that changes each series, with previous locations including Dukes Meadows Bandstand, Buckinghamshire Railway Centre, Chesham United F.C.'s stadium, Gatwick Airport's South Terminal, and Frogmore Paper Mill.

== Special episodes ==
A series of "New Year Treat" episodes, featuring celebrities other than comedians in single-episode competitions, has a golden statue of Davies' eyebrows as its trophy.

Series winners qualify for future "Champion of Champions" episodes, where the trophy is the golden statue of the rest of Davies' body. The first Champion of Champions was a two-part special; however, the rest all had only one episode. There have currently been four Champion of Champions (winners in bold):

- Champion of Champions 1: Bob Mortimer (series 5), **Josh Widdicombe** (series 1), Katherine Ryan (series 2), Noel Fielding (series 4), Rob Beckett (series 3) — two episodes: episode 1, 13 December 2017 / episode 2, 20 December 2017
- Champion of Champions 2: Ed Gamble (series 9), Kerry Godliman (series 7), Liza Tarbuck (series 6), Lou Sanders (series 8), **Richard Herring** (series 10) — one episode: 23 June 2022
- Champion of Champions 3: **Dara Ó Briain** (series 14), Kiell Smith-Bynoe (series 15 runner-up, stepping in for Mae Martin), Morgana Robinson (series 12), Sarah Kendall (series 11), Sophie Duker (series 13) — one episode: 14 January 2024
- Champion of Champions 4: Andy Zaltzman (series 18), John Robins (series 17), Maisie Adam (series 20), **Mathew Baynton** (series 19), Sam Campbell (series 16) — one episode: 22 December 2025

== Production ==
Most tasks are recorded with each contestant separately in a house in Chiswick, London. However, Alex Horne's initial plan was to carry out the tasks in the comedians' houses, saying in an interview: "I didn't realise how impractical that would be both in terms of cost – and their lives." Filming tasks takes roughly one day per contestant per episode, filming around eight tasks a day, with the days of filming spread out across several months. Before the studio filming, contestants are forbidden to discuss their tasks and are not shown any footage from the tasks, so that studio reactions are genuine. Studio filming, which includes the prize tasks and the live tasks, was located at the Clapham Grand theatre during the first series. This changed to Fountain Studios for series 2 and 3, and again to Pinewood Studios from series 4–20, using a studio set resembling the interior of the Clapham Grand theatre that was used for the first series. From series 21, the show moved to Television Centre after the Pinewood studio discontinued all TV shows.

Horne designs the tasks, with Tim Key, to avoid the need for any specialist equipment, so that "people at home [are] able to do the same things". Initially, they planned to have Horne show the right way to complete the task after showing the contestants' attempts, but this plan was abandoned as "it supposed there was a right way". Some tasks in the first series involved the general public, but later series avoided this in order to prevent coming across as a "prank show". Some tasks are vetoed by producers for pragmatic reasons, such as "paint the biggest thing red". Others do not turn out as expected, such as "burst all these bubbles [on a massive roll of bubble wrap] – fastest wins", which had been attempted in three different series but not shown in any of them, as "it always ends with people jumping on it for hours".

When asked why he did not present the show, Horne has said that "that was never the plan [...] My role as sidekick is to be sneaky and you can run it from the sides in a really funny way." Horne and Greg Davies had never worked together before Taskmaster; According to Horne, Davies was chosen because of his authority, adding that in the pilot, Davies acted as a "dictator figure cross with everyone", but his tone in the show is more relaxed, as "if someone doesn't do something well we really enjoy it so he can be himself".

The series director for Taskmaster is Andy Devonshire, who was previously series director on The Apprentice and the BBC versions of The Great British Bake Off. Peter Orton was director for three episodes in 2016. Production designer James Dillon is responsible for the studio and filming locations as well as the caravan featured from series four onwards, having been past known for designing the original set for The Crystal Maze. Taskmaster's theme music was written and performed by The Horne Section, a jazz band led by Horne.

== Cast ==
In the studio, other than while attempting the live task, the contestants sit on a row of chairs, usually in alphabetical order of forename from left to right.
Key

- * Series champion
- ** CoC champion
- ‡ NYT champion
- NYT = New Year Treat
- CoC = Champion of Champions

Series	Year	Seating				
Series	Year	1st	2nd	3rd	4th	5th
1	2015	Frank Skinner	Josh Widdicombe *	Roisin Conaty	Romesh Ranganathan	Tim Key
2	2016	Doc Brown	Joe Wilkinson	Jon Richardson	Katherine Ryan *	Richard Osman
3	2016	Al Murray	Dave Gorman	Paul Chowdhry	Rob Beckett *	Sara Pascoe
4	2017	Hugh Dennis	Joe Lycett	Lolly Adefope	Mel Giedroyc	Noel Fielding *
5	2017	Aisling Bea	Bob Mortimer *	Mark Watson	Nish Kumar	Sally Phillips
CoC	2017	Bob Mortimer	Josh Widdicombe **	Katherine Ryan	Noel Fielding	Rob Beckett
6	2018	Alice Levine	Asim Chaudhry	Liza Tarbuck *	Russell Howard	Tim Vine
7	2018	James Acaster	Jessica Knappett	Kerry Godliman *	Phil Wang	Rhod Gilbert
8	2019	Iain Stirling	Joe Thomas	Lou Sanders *	Paul Sinha	Sian Gibson
9	2019	David Baddiel	Ed Gamble *	Jo Brand	Katy Wix (Note: Katy Wix was ill for filming the studio segments of Episodes 5 and 6, so Kerry Godliman and Katherine Ryan stood in for her respectively.)	Rose Matafeo
10	2020	Daisy May Cooper	Johnny Vegas	Katherine Parkinson	Mawaan Rizwan	Richard Herring *
NYT	2021	John Hannah	Krishnan Guru-Murthy	Nicola Coughlan	Rylan Clark-Neal	Shirley Ballas ‡
11	2021	Charlotte Ritchie	Jamali Maddix	Lee Mack	Mike Wozniak	Sarah Kendall *
12	2021	Alan Davies	Desiree Burch	Guz Khan	Morgana Robinson *	Victoria Coren Mitchell
NYT II	2022	Adrian Chiles ‡	Claudia Winkleman	Jonnie Peacock (Note: Jonnie Peacock was ill for filming of the studio segments, so Alan Davies stood in his place.)	Lady Leshurr	Sayeeda Warsi
13	2022	Ardal O'Hanlon	Bridget Christie	Chris Ramsey	Judi Love	Sophie Duker *
CoC II	2022	Ed Gamble	Kerry Godliman	Liza Tarbuck	Lou Sanders	Richard Herring **
14	2022	Dara Ó Briain *	Fern Brady	John Kearns	Munya Chawawa	Sarah Millican
NYT III	2023	Amelia Dimoldenberg	Carol Vorderman	Greg James	Mo Farah ‡	Rebecca Lucy Taylor
15	2023	Frankie Boyle	Ivo Graham	Jenny Eclair	Kiell Smith-Bynoe	Mae Martin *
16	2023	Julian Clary	Lucy Beaumont	Sam Campbell *	Sue Perkins	Susan Wokoma
NYT IV	2024	Deborah Meaden	Kojey Radical	Lenny Rush ‡	Steve Backshall	Zoe Ball
CoC III	2024	Dara Ó Briain **	Kiell Smith-Bynoe (Note: Runner-up Kiell Smith-Bynoe replaced Series 15 champion Mae Martin in both tasks and studio segments of Champion of Champions III, as Martin was unavailable for filming.)	Morgana Robinson	Sarah Kendall	Sophie Duker
17	2024	Joanne McNally	John Robins *	Nick Mohammed	Sophie Willan	Steve Pemberton
18	2024	Andy Zaltzman *	Babatunde Aléshé	Emma Sidi	Jack Dee	Rosie Jones
NYT V	2024	David James	Hannah Fry	Martin Lewis	Melanie Blatt	Sue Johnston ‡
19	2025	Fatiha El-Ghorri	Jason Mantzoukas	Mathew Baynton *	Rosie Ramsey	Stevie Martin
20	2025	Ania Magliano	Maisie Adam *	Phil Ellis	Reece Shearsmith	Sanjeev Bhaskar
CoC IV	2025	Andy Zaltzman	John Robins	Maisie Adam	Mathew Baynton **	Sam Campbell
NYT VI	2026	Big Zuu	Jill Scott	Rose Ayling-Ellis (Note: To best accommodate her need for a British Sign Language interpreter, Rose Ayling-Ellis sat in the furthest right chair for the studio recording, while Sam Ryder and Susie Dent sat in the third and fourth chairs respectively. For the live tasks, and on the reveal and promotional posters, Ayling-Ellis is still positioned in the centre (for the usual alphabetical order).) ‡	Sam Ryder	Susie Dent
21	2026	Amy Gledhill	Armando Iannucci	Joanna Page *	Joel Dommett	Kumail Nanjiani
22	2026	Chloe Petts *	Isy Suttie	Matt Lucas	Nina Conti	Richard Ayoade
NYT VII	TBA	Alison Hammond	Chesney Hawkes	Francis Bourgeois	Maryam Moshiri	Robert Rinder

== Episodes ==
Series	Episodes	Originally released		
Series	Episodes	First released	Last released	Network
1	6	28 July 2015	1 September 2015	Dave
2	5	21 June 2016	19 July 2016	Dave
3	5	4 October 2016	1 November 2016	Dave
4	8	25 April 2017	13 June 2017	Dave
5	8	13 September 2017	1 November 2017	Dave
CoC	2	13 December 2017	20 December 2017	Dave
6	10	2 May 2018	4 July 2018	Dave
7	10	5 September 2018	7 November 2018	Dave
8	10	8 May 2019	10 July 2019	Dave
9	10	4 September 2019	6 November 2019	Dave
10	10	15 October 2020	17 December 2020	Channel 4
NYT	1	1 January 2021		Channel 4
11	10	18 March 2021	20 May 2021	Channel 4
12	10	23 September 2021	25 November 2021	Channel 4
NYT II	1	1 January 2022		Channel 4
13	10	14 April 2022	16 June 2022	Channel 4
CoC II	1	23 June 2022		Channel 4
14	10	29 September 2022	1 December 2022	Channel 4
NYT III	1	1 January 2023		Channel 4
15	10	30 March 2023	1 June 2023	Channel 4
16	10	21 September 2023	23 November 2023	Channel 4
NYT IV	1	2 January 2024		Channel 4
CoC III	1	14 January 2024		Channel 4
17	10	28 March 2024	30 May 2024	Channel 4
18	10	12 September 2024	14 November 2024	Channel 4
NYT V	1	29 December 2024		Channel 4
19	10	1 May 2025	3 July 2025	Channel 4
20	10	11 September 2025	13 November 2025	Channel 4
CoC IV	1	22 December 2025		Channel 4
NYT VI	2	2 January 2026	3 January 2026	Channel 4
21	10	9 April 2026	11 June 2026	Channel 4
22	10	3 September 2026	5 November 2026	Channel 4

== Franchise ==
=== International broadcast ===
The British show is also broadcast in Belgium, The Netherlands, Sweden, South Africa, Norway, Finland, Australia, Denmark, New Zealand, Croatia and Portugal. In Australia, SBS Viceland started to air Taskmaster episodes on 27 July 2020. The most recently broadcast series is available on SBS on Demand.

In the United States, The CW acquired series 8 and 9 of Taskmaster for a late-Summer run premiering on 2 August 2020. However, the series opened to extremely low viewership (in comparison to the Canadian import, Fridge Wars, which premiered the same day), and was consequently pulled from the network's schedule on 5 August. The CW added the entirety of Series 8 to its "CW Seed" streaming library on 10 August.

A subscription streaming service, Taskmaster SuperMax+, debuted in March 2022. It allows worldwide access to the British version of Taskmaster, free from ads. It followed the show's cult popularity in America from the show's availability on YouTube starting in 2019; a U.S. version of Taskmaster and broadcast of the British version on The CW were not successful. Horne stated that adding international versions to the service may occur at a later date.

From series 16 to series 19, new episodes were available on YouTube outside the UK (Note: Also unavailable in Ireland, Australia and New Zealand, and Nordic territories) one day after their original broadcast. Beginning with series 20 in September 2025, new episodes are made available one hour after the UK original broadcast. By this point, the Taskmaster channel had reached about 2 million subscribers worldwide with a total of 1.2 billion views. As of 8 June 2026, the channel has 2.22 million subscribers and has had over 1.5 billion views, with series 1 to series 21 episodes available on YouTube.

=== International versions ===
International versions of the programme have been made in Belgium (as Het Grootste Licht; literally "The Greatest Light", but meaning "The Brightest Bulb"), Sweden (as Bäst i test; "Best in Test"), Norway (as Kongen befaler; "The King Commands", and Norwegian for Simon Says), and Spain (as Dicho y hecho; "Said and Done"). In Denmark, the programme is titled Stormester ("Grandmaster") and premiered on 25 August 2018. In April 2017, a US version with Reggie Watts as the Taskmaster and Horne as the assistant was announced, made by Avalon, the same production company for the UK version, and aired on Comedy Central on 27 April 2018. In November 2024, Horne has said that he had been in discussions to try again at a US version, with Davies and himself as the hosts.

A German version featuring Atze Schröder as the Taskmaster and Carsten van Ryssen was commissioned by RTL in 2017; two episodes were recorded but not broadcast.

In 2019, it was announced a New Zealand version would be produced, hosted by Jeremy Wells and Paul Williams. Finnish network MTV3 aired a local version Suurmestari ("Grandmaster") starting on 12 April 2020. An international adaptation, Direktor svemira ("Director of the Universe"), by Croatian broadcaster RTL, began to air on 24 November 2021. Portugal's RTP1 announced in 2021 that a Portuguese version would start broadcasting in early 2022, hosted by Vasco Palmeirim and Nuno Markl. Network 10's Australian version debuted in February 2023, hosted by Tom Gleeson and Tom Cashman. In March 2025, RTL announced that a Dutch version of the show was in development, hosted by Arjen Lubach. A pilot episode has already been recorded, and the series is set to air in late 2026. In October 2025, Avalon announced that Estonian and Icelandic versions are being produced. On 7 November 2025, it was revealed that Taskmaster - Iceland will air in early spring of 2026, as well as hosts of the show - Ari Eldjárn as The Taskmaster, and Jóhann Alfreð Kristinsson as his assistant. On 17 February, it was announced that Taskmaster - Kuninga Käsul (Taskmaster - By the King's Orders) will be hosted by Kristjan Jõekalda as the Taskmaster and Marta Laan as his assistant. On 14 April 2026, Avalon announced that a Polish version of the show will be produced, and five days later, the hosts of the show were confirmed as Adam Woronowicz and Cezary Sikora. On 12 October 2026, it was announced that a French version of the show will be produced.

On 1 June 2026, the official Taskmaster YouTube channel announced the creation of a new channel, Taskmaster International, that will contain international versions of the show.

Country	Title	Year(s)	Series aired	Channel(s)	Hosts
Australia	Taskmaster Australia	2023–present	5	Network 10	Tom Gleeson; Tom Cashman
Belgium; Flanders	Het Grootste Licht	2016	1	VTM	Gert Verhulst; Ruth Beeckmans
Canada; Quebec	Le maître du jeu	2022–present	4	Noovo Crave	Louis Morissette; Antoine Vézina
Canada; Quebec	Le maître du jeu Junior	2026	1	Noovo Crave	Patrice Bélanger; Antoine Vézina
Croatia	Direktor svemira	2021, 2026	2	RTL	Ivan Šarić; Luka Petrušić
Denmark	Stormester	2018–present	9	TV 2	Lasse Rimmer; Mark Le Fêvre
Estonia	Taskmaster - kuninga käsul	2026	1	TV3	Kristjan Jõekalda; Marta Laan
Finland	Suurmestari	2020–present	6	MTV3	Jaakko Saariluoma; Pilvi Hämäläinen
Finland	Juniori Suurmestari	2024	1	MTV Katsomo; MTV3	Jaakko Saariluoma; Pilvi Hämäläinen
France	Taskmaster France	TBA		TF1	TBA; Camille Combal
Germany	Taskmaster	2017 pilot only (unaired)		RTL	Atze Schröder; Carsten van Ryssen
Iceland	Taskmaster Ísland	2026	1	Sýn	Ari Eldjárn; Jóhann Alfreð Kristinsson
Netherlands	Taskmaster NL	2026	1	RTL 4 and Videoland	Arjen Lubach; Diederik Smit
New Zealand	Taskmaster New Zealand	2020–present	6	TVNZ 2	Jeremy Wells; Paul Williams
Norway	Kongen befaler	2019–present	12	TVNorge discovery+	Atle Antonsen (1–6, 8-); Bård Ylvisåker (7); Olli Wermskog
Poland	Taskmaster	2026	1	TVN	Adam Woronowicz; Cezary Sikora
Portugal	Taskmaster	2022–present	6	RTP1	Vasco Palmeirim; Nuno Markl
Spain	Dicho y hecho	2018	1	La 1	Anabel Alonso; José Corbacho
Sweden	Bäst i test	2017–present	12	SVT (1–7); TV4 (8–)	Babben Larsson; David Sundin
United States	Taskmaster	2018	1	Comedy Central	Reggie Watts; Alex Horne
Legend: Airing franchise Upcoming franchise Franchise no longer airing Status unknown

== Related media ==
=== Books ===
A tie-in book, Taskmaster — 200 Extraordinary Tasks for Ordinary People, was written by Alex Horne and published by Penguin Random House on 6 September 2018.

Task 185 in the book provided the latitude and longitude of a Buckinghamshire park, with instructions to meet there at midday on 14 September 2019 for a picnic and Taskmaster tour. The event was attended by around 1,800 people, with Horne himself present to show attendees filming locations from the show.

In September 2019, a paperback edition was published, with 20 new tasks. As well as writing additional tasks, Horne removed the expiration date of 31 December 2019 where it appeared, and replaced tasks that had a set completion date.

In September 2021, a new book titled Bring Me The Head of the Taskmaster — 101 Next-level Tasks (and Clues) that Will Lead One Ordinary Person to Some Extraordinary Taskmaster Treasure was released. It offered readers the chance to win a real-world Taskmaster prize.

Horne co-wrote An Absolute Casserole: The Taskmaster Compendium alongside Jack Bernhardt, who co-hosts Taskmaster: The People's Podcast and maintains statistics on the series. The book was released in November 2024 and was intended to provide "statistics, tidbits, and secrets" associated with the show in anticipation of its 10-year anniversary.

=== Board game ===
The board game Taskmaster was released in autumn 2019, initially selling out. It contains 200 task cards, along with secret tasks that individual players must perform, and video tasks featuring Alex Horne.

=== Video game ===
On 29 November 2023, Taskmaster VR was announced. Taskmaster VR, the first project of game studio Scallywag Arcade, released on Meta and Steam on 19 June 2024.

=== #HomeTasking ===
From March to June 2020, during the COVID-19 pandemic and a period of lockdown in the UK, Alex Horne organised a series of tasks in the style of Taskmaster for the public to perform and record in their own homes. Entries were submitted on Twitter and compilation videos, including scoring of the ten best entries by Greg Davies, were published by the Taskmaster YouTube channel. The first task was "Throw a piece of A4 paper into a bin. Most spectacular throw wins." There were 20 tasks in total.

A new series of Hometasking, started during another lockdown in the UK, began on 14 January 2021, featuring tasks previously performed on the TV show.

=== Podcasts ===
On 15 October 2020, an official podcast began. It is hosted by Ed Gamble, the winner of Series 9, who comments on each featured episode (including specials and Junior) with a special guest, often a current or former contestant. Initially it focused on Series 10, with each podcast released immediately after each Taskmaster episode was broadcast. Between series, past episodes are covered sequentially, starting with Series 1 in January 2021 and completing Series 9 in July 2023. In July 2024, between-series episodes resumed, with the New Zealand edition as the new topic.

A second official podcast, called Taskmaster: The People's Podcast, was launched in April 2022. It was initially hosted by Series 8 champion Lou Sanders and comedy writer Jack Bernhardt. In September 2023 it was announced that series 15 contestant Jenny Eclair would be replacing Lou Sanders' role as host of the podcast. The hosts chat with Taskmaster fans as well as with cast and crew members.

=== The Live Experience ===
Taskmaster: The Live Experience was a public attraction running from September 2024 to February 2025 in London.

=== My Ultimate Episode ===
Since 2024, a series titled "My Ultimate Episode" has aired on the official Taskmaster YouTube channel. In the series, former contestants are filmed looking back on former tasks that they took part in and talk about their experience on the show.

Date	Person	Person's series	Ref.
15 June 2024	Kiell Smith-Bynoe	Series 15 (2nd) / Champion of Champions III (tied 4th)	
7 July 2024	Lou Sanders	Series 8 (1st) / Champion of Champions II (3rd)	
4 August 2024	Phil Wang	Series 7 (5th)	
18 August 2024	John Kearns	Series 14 (tied 4th)	
5 December 2024	Desiree Burch	Series 12 (tied 3rd)	
16 December 2024	Ivo Graham	Series 15 (5th)	
12 January 2025	Richard Osman	Series 2 (3rd)	
20 January 2025	Kerry Godliman	Series 7 (1st) / Champion of Champions II (3rd)	
30 January 2025	Al Murray	Series 3 (3rd)	
1 March 2025	Morgana Robinson	Series 12 (1st) / Champion of Champions III (3rd)	
15 March 2025	Paul Chowdhry	Series 3 (5th)	
13 May 2025	Ed Gamble	Series 9 (1st) / Champion of Champions II (5th)	
20 July 2025	Joe Thomas	Series 8 (3rd)	
27 July 2025	Susan Wokoma	Series 16 (3rd)	
3 August 2025	Asim Chaudhry	Series 6 (4th)	
17 August 2025	Jenny Eclair	Series 15 (3rd)	
29 November 2025	Sophie Duker	Series 13 (1st) / Champion of Champions III (2nd)	
25 December 2025	James Acaster	Series 7 (4th)	
12 February 2026	Dara Ó Briain	Series 14 (1st) / Champion of Champions III (1st)	
1 March 2026	Aisling Bea	Series 5 (4th)	
15 March 2026	Steve Pemberton	Series 17 (3rd)	
19 June 2026	Mark Watson	Series 5 (2nd)	
26 June 2026	Jamali Maddix	Series 11 (4th)	
24 July 2026	Nish Kumar	Series 5 (5th)	
14 August 2026	Stevie Martin	Series 19 (2nd)	
23 August 2026	Tom Cashman	Taskmaster Australia (assistant)	

=== Taskmaster Live Stream: GOSH Charity Edition ===
On 3 August 2026, it was announced that Taskmaster would be hosting a one-off livestreamed special to raise money for Great Ormond Street Hospital. The special was livestreamed on YouTube and Twitch on 5 September and was hosted by Horne alongside Jake Bhardwaj and Stephanie Patrick. Content creators TommyInnit, Ayamé, Stephen Tries, Hayley Morris, MatPat, Rob Colfer, BambinoBecky, Imogen Andrews and comedy trio The Squid participated as contestants.

On 27 August, content creators The Technical Difficulties, consisting of Tom Scott, Natalie Gray, Gary Brannan, and Chris Joel, revealed that they had been set an official task as part of the special. The task was released on the group's YouTube channel on 3 September, with Gray being selected to draw the most beautiful picture of Horne in five minutes whilst blindfolded.

The special included guest appearances from Greg Davies, Gordon Ramsay, Dan and Phil, Deborah Meaden, Jason Isaacs, Harry Davies-Carr from the "Charlie bit my finger" viral video, VTuber Utano Pandora, Jack Black, Chris Stark, Jordan North, and Siân Welby of Capital Breakfast, and Jedward.

== Reception ==
=== Critical reception ===
Andrew Billen of The Times gave a five-star review of the show's first episode, "Melon Buffet", calling it "funny, revealing, and glorious" and comparing it to The Generation Game. In another review of the first episode, Filipa Jodelka of The Guardian described Taskmaster as a panel show with an "edgy parlour-game twist". Jodelka praised the "molten-hot banter" between contestants and Davies, and compared the arbitrary awarding of points to QI and Numberwang. Also reviewing "Melon Buffet", Ellen Jones of The Independent praised the show as entertaining despite its "informal and cheap-looking" style.

Wesley Mead of Den of Geek wrote a positive review in 2016, praising the show as the "crowning jewel" of original programming on Dave, and approving of the design of the tasks and the range of approaches that contestants demonstrate. Mead believed that the second series was an improvement on the first, but criticised that the first three series had only one female contestant apiece.

=== Awards and nominations ===
Awards and nominations received by Taskmaster
Year	Award	Category	Recipients	Result	Ref
2016	British Comedy Guide Awards	Best TV Entertainment Show	—N/a	Won	
2017	British Academy Television Awards	Best Comedy and Comedy Entertainment Programme	Alex Horne, Andy Cartwright, Andy Devonshire	Nominated	
2017	International Emmy Award	Non-Scripted Entertainment	Avalon Television, Dave	Nominated	
2017	RTS Programme Awards	Best Entertainment Programme	Avalon Television	Nominated	
2017	British Comedy Guide Awards	Best TV Entertainment Show	—N/a	Won	
2018	British Academy Television Awards	Best Comedy and Comedy Entertainment Programme	Alex Horne, Andy Cartwright, Andy Devonshire	Nominated	
2018	British Comedy Guide Awards	Best TV Entertainment Show	—N/a	Won	
2019	British Comedy Guide Awards	Best TV Entertainment Show	—N/a	Nominated	
2020	British Academy Television Awards	Best Comedy and Comedy Entertainment Programme	Alex Horne, Andy Cartwright, Andy Devonshire, James Taylor	Won	
2020	British Comedy Guide Awards	Best TV Entertainment Show	—N/a	Won	
2021	British Comedy Guide Awards	Best TV Entertainment Show	—N/a	Won	
2021	British Comedy Guide Awards	Comedy of the Year	—N/a	Won	
2021	National Television Awards	The Sir Bruce Forsyth Entertainment Award	—N/a	Nominated	
2022	British Comedy Guide Awards	Best TV Entertainment Show	—N/a	Won	
2022	National Comedy Awards	Best Comedy Entertainment Series	—N/a	Won	
2022	National Comedy Awards	Outstanding Female Comedy Entertainment Performance	Daisy May Cooper	Nominated	
2022	National Comedy Awards	Outstanding Male Comedy Entertainment Performance	Mike Wozniak	Nominated	
2022	National Television Awards	The Sir Bruce Forsyth Entertainment Award	—N/a	Nominated	
2023	British Academy Television Awards	Best Entertainment Craft Team	Andy Devonshire, James Dillon, Dru Masters, Rebecca Bowker	Nominated	
2023	British Academy Television Awards	Best Comedy Entertainment Programme	Alex Horne, Andy Devonshire, Andy Cartwright, James Taylor	Nominated	
2023	National Comedy Awards	Best Comedy Entertainment Series	—N/a	Won	
2023	National Comedy Awards	Outstanding Female Comedy Entertainment Performance	Fern Brady	Nominated	
2023	National Comedy Awards	Outstanding Female Comedy Entertainment Performance	Judi Love	Nominated	
2023	National Comedy Awards	Outstanding Female Comedy Entertainment Performance	Sarah Millican	Nominated	
2023	National Comedy Awards	Outstanding Male Comedy Entertainment Performance	Alex Horne	Nominated	
2023	National Comedy Awards	Outstanding Male Comedy Entertainment Performance	Greg Davies	Nominated	
2023	National Comedy Awards	Outstanding Male Comedy Entertainment Performance	Munya Chawawa	Nominated	
2023	National Television Awards	Best TV Presenter	Greg Davies	Nominated	
2023	National Television Awards	The Sir Bruce Forsyth Entertainment Award	—N/a	Nominated	
2025	British Academy Television Awards	Best Entertainment Craft Team	Andy Devonshire, Rebecca Bowker, James Dillon, Dru Masters	Won	
2025	British Academy Television Awards	Best Entertainment	Andy Devonshire, Andy Cartwright, James Taylor, Alex Horne, Jon Thoday	Nominated	
