= I Like to Watch =

2019 American web series

- Genre: Comedy
- Starring: Trixie Mattel; Katya Zamolodchikova
- Country of origin: United States
- Original language: English
- No. of seasons: 8
- No. of episodes: 137

Production
- Running time: 11–53 Minutes
- Production company: Netflix

Original release
- Network: YouTube
- Release: November 21, 2019 – present

Related
- UNHhhh; The Trixie & Katya Show

I Like to Watch is a 2019 American web series hosted by drag queens Trixie Mattel and Katya Zamolodchikova.

== History ==
I Like to Watch is a 2019 American web series hosted by drag queens Trixie Mattel and Katya Zamolodchikova. The series was created by Netflix, and streams on the company's YouTube channel. I Like to Watch films its hosts as they view and react to various Netflix Original Programming and licensed films streaming on Netflix. The first season aired from November 21, 2019, to March 21, 2020. A second season, recorded in the duo's homes during the COVID-19 pandemic, premiered on May 23, 2020. The third season, still recorded from home but with the hosts together in person before moving to a new set, premiered on February 20, 2021. The series won a People's Voice Webby Award in 2022. In 2023 the series won a Bronze Anthem Award in the Awareness & Media categories for Diversity, Equity & Inclusion.

=== Development and release ===
I Like to Watch was created for Netflix's queer social channel "Most". Mattel and Zamolodchikova first appeared together as contestants on the seventh season of RuPaul's Drag Race and would go on to jointly appear in a range of projects, including the web series UNHhhh and The Trixie & Katya Show. The series was first teased on Mattel's Instagram on November 20, 2019, with the first episode of the series released the subsequent day.

=== Reception ===
I Like to Watch was positively received by critics, with a review of the first episode for Pajiba noting that "when Trixie and Katya join forces, it's a blend of whimsy, wackiness, and raunch so intoxicating it feels like downing a pair of Absolut Vodka cocktails." The series was also positively reviewed by Out, PinkNews, and NewNowNext. The New York Times cited I Like to Watch as an example of a reality television series that "offer[s] gentle escapism in a genre better known for manipulating participants for entertainment." The Times further noted the similarities between the series and the Channel 4 series Gogglebox, describing I Like to Watch as "extremely reminiscent of Gogglebox, but with more glamour." A representative for Netflix responded that the network would "let the work speak for itself."

=== Celebrity appearances ===
In the episode featuring Trixie and Katya watching My Best Friend's Wedding, the 90s rom-com classic, one of the film’s stars, Rupert Everett, says hello. When watching the Twilight Saga, Elvira addresses Katya and a skeleton Trixie. Lindsay Lohan greets Trixie and Katya before they watch her holiday film Falling For Christmas. Megan Thee Stallion, while having no affiliation with Wednesday the series, greets Trixie and Katya before they watch the show. Stars of Heartstopper Kit Connor and Joe Locke, asked Trixie and Katya on social media to watch their series and "do their worst" and surprise Trixie and Katya with a greeting asking for the same. Annie Murphy and Salma Hayek Pinault appeared onstage during the live episode for Joan is Awful.

== Episodes ==
=== Season 1 (2019–2020) ===
No. overall	No. in season	Programming	Notes	Original release date	Ref
1	1	"The Crown"	Season 3	November 21, 2019	
2	2	"The Knight Before Christmas"	–	November 27, 2019	
3	3	"Dolly Parton's Heartstrings"	Currently unavailable	December 6, 2019	
4	4	"Spinning Out"	–	January 11, 2020	
5	5	"AJ and the Queen"	–	January 18, 2020	
6	6	"The Circle"	Season 1	January 31, 2020	
7	7	"Chilling Adventures of Sabrina"	Part 3	February 8, 2020	
8	8	"Glow Up"	Series 1	March 1, 2020	
9	9	"Sex, Explained"	–	March 21, 2020	

=== Season 2 (2020–2021) ===
No. overall	No. in season	Programming	Notes	Original release date	Ref
10	1	"Too Hot to Handle"	Season 1	May 23, 2020	–
11	2	"Tiger King"	Season 1	June 27, 2020	–
12	3	"Mucho Mucho Amor"	–	July 19, 2020	–
13	4	"Work It"	–	August 8, 2020	–
14	5	"The Umbrella Academy"	Season 2	August 15, 2020	–
15	6	"Glow Up"	Series 2	August 25, 2020	–
16	7	"Lucifer"	Season 5	August 29, 2020	–
17	8	"Away"	–	September 12, 2020	–
18	9	"The Babysitter: Killer Queen"	–	September 19, 2020	–
19	10	"The Haunting of Bly Manor"	–	October 10, 2020	–
20	11	"The Witches"	–	October 17, 2020	–
20	11	"Scream"	–	October 17, 2020	–
20	11	"Gerald's Game"	–	October 17, 2020	–
20	11	"The Evil Dead"	–	October 17, 2020	–
20	11	"Poltergeist"	–	October 17, 2020	–
21	12	"House at the End of the Street"	–	October 24, 2020	–
21	12	"In the Tall Grass"	–	October 24, 2020	–
21	12	"Hush"	–	October 24, 2020	–
21	12	"We Summon the Darkness"	–	October 24, 2020	–
21	12	"Cabin Fever"	–	October 24, 2020	–
22	13	"Killer Klowns from Outer Space"	–	October 31, 2020	–
22	13	"Session 9"	–	October 31, 2020	–
22	13	"Would You Rather"	–	October 31, 2020	–
22	13	"Eli"	–	October 31, 2020	–
22	13	"Girls with Balls"	–	October 31, 2020	–
23	14	"I Am the Pretty Thing That Lives in the House"	–	November 7, 2020	–
23	14	"Winchester"	–	November 7, 2020	–
23	14	"The Autopsy of Jane Doe"	–	November 7, 2020	–
23	14	"Cargo"	–	November 7, 2020	–
23	14	"#Alive"	–	November 7, 2020	–
24	15	"The Princess Switch: Switched Again"	–	November 21, 2020	–
25	16	"We Are the Champions"	–	November 28, 2020	–
26	17	"Big Mouth"	Season 4	December 5, 2020	–
27	18	"Selena: The Series"	–	December 12, 2020	–
28	19	"Christmas on the Square"	–	December 19, 2020	–
29	20	"The Great British Baking Show"	2019/20 New Year's Special	December 26, 2020	–
30	21	"Cobra Kai"	Fight Scenes	January 2, 2021	–
31	22	"Bling Empire"	Season 1	January 16, 2021	–

=== Season 3 (2021) ===
No. overall	No. in season	Programming	Notes	Original release date	Ref
32	1	"I Care a Lot"	–	February 20, 2021	–
33	2	"Buried by the Bernards"	–	February 27, 2021	–
34	3	"The Queen's Gambit"	–	March 6, 2021	–
35	4	"Operation Varsity Blues"	–	March 20, 2021	–
36	5	"Ratched"	–	March 27, 2021	–
37	6	"Selling Sunset"	Seasons 1–3	April 10, 2021	–
38	7	"Shadow and Bone"	Season 1	April 24, 2021	–
39	8	"The Circle"	Season 2	May 1, 2021	–
40	9	"The Woman in the Window"	–	May 15, 2021	–
41	10	"Special"	Season 2	May 22, 2021	–
42	11	"My Best Friend’s Wedding"	–	June 5, 2021	–
43	12	"Feel Good"	Season 2	June 12, 2021	–
44	13	"Legally Blonde"	–	June 19, 2021	–
45	14	"Pose"	Seasons 1 and 2	June 26, 2021	–
46	15	"Never Have I Ever"	Season 2	July 17, 2021	–
47	16	"The Fear Street Trilogy"	–	July 24, 2021	–
48	17	"Glow Up"	Series 3	August 7, 2021	–
49	18	"He's All That"	–	August 28, 2021	–
50	19	"Kate"	–	September 18, 2021	–
51	20	"Sex Education"	Season 3	September 25, 2021	–
52	21	"Twilight"	Hosted by Katya and Jujubee	October 30, 2021	–
52	21	"New Moon"	Hosted by Katya and Jujubee	October 30, 2021	–
52	21	"Eclipse"	Hosted by Katya and Jujubee	October 30, 2021	–
53	22	"Breaking Dawn – Part 1"	Hosted by Katya and Fena Barbitall	October 31, 2021	–
53	22	"Breaking Dawn – Part 2"	Hosted by Katya and Fena Barbitall	October 31, 2021	–
54	23	"Tiger King"	Season 2 Hosted by Katya and Jinkx Monsoon	November 21, 2021	–
55	24	"Single All the Way"	–	December 11, 2021	–
56	25	"The Princess Switch 3: Romancing the Star"	–	December 18, 2021	–
57	26	"Emily in Paris"	Season 2	December 24, 2021	–

=== Season 4 (2022) ===
No. overall	No. in season	Programming	Notes	Original release date	Ref
58	1	"Squid Game"	Season 1	January 29, 2022	–
59	2	"The Woman in the House Across the Street from the Girl in the Window"	–	February 12, 2022	–
60	3	"Texas Chainsaw Massacre"	–	February 19, 2022	–
61	4	"The Adam Project"	–	March 12, 2022	–
62	5	"Bridgerton"	Season 2	March 26, 2022	–
63	6	"Elite"	Season 5	April 16, 2022	–
64	7	"Russian Doll"	Season 2	April 30, 2022	–
65	8	"Grace and Frankie"	Season 7	May 7, 2022	–
66	9	"Stranger Things"	Season 1 Season 2 Season 3	May 21, 2022	–
67	10	"Young Royals"	Season 1	June 4, 2022	–
68	11	"First Kill"	–	June 25, 2022	–
69	12	"Resident Evil"	–	July 23, 2022	–
70	13	"Uncoupled"	–	August 6, 2022	–
71	14	"The Sandman"	Season 1	August 27, 2022 (Note: The episode originally aired on August 13, 2022, but was removed shortly afterwards, due to the episode containing spoilers for the season finale, which was set to air a week later. It was later rereleased on August 27.)	–
72	15	"Selling the OC"	Season 1	September 3, 2022	–
73	16	"Dated & Related"	–	September 10, 2022	–
74	17	"Mean Girls"	–	September 17, 2022	–
75	18	"Brand New Cherry Flavor"	–	October 8, 2022	–
76	19	"The Midnight Club"	–	October 15, 2022	–
77	20	"Love is Blind"	Season 3	November 12, 2022	–
78	21	"Falling for Christmas"	–	November 26, 2022	–
79	22	"Wednesday"	Season 1	December 3, 2022	–
80	23	"Heartstopper"	Season 1	December 24, 2022	–

=== Season 5 (2023) ===
No. overall	No. in season	Programming	Notes	Original release date	Ref
81	1	"Perfect Match"	Season 1	March 4, 2023	–
82	2	"You"	Season 4	March 11, 2023	–
83	3	"Sex/Life"	Season 2	March 18, 2023	–
84	4	"Outlast"	Season 1	March 25, 2023	–
85	5	"Love is Blind"	Season 4	April 15, 2023	–
86	6	"Beef"	Season 1	April 29, 2023	–
87	7	"Queen Charlotte: A Bridgerton Story"	–	May 19, 2023	–
88	8	"The Ultimatum: Queer Love"	Season 1	June 10, 2023	–
89	9	"Black Mirror: Joan Is Awful (live at the Paris Theater)"	Season 6	June 24, 2023	–
90	10	"Survival of the Thickest"	Season 1	July 29, 2023	–
91	11	"How To Become A Cult Leader"	Season 1	August 5, 2023	–
92	12	"Heartstopper"	Season 2	August 12, 2023	–
93	13	"One Piece"	Season 1	September 9, 2023	–

=== Season 6 (2024–2025) ===
No. overall	No. in season	Programming	Notes	Original release date	Ref
94	1	"The Brothers Sun"	Hosted by Trixie and Orville Peck	January 13, 2024	–
95	2	"The Trust: A Game of Greed"	Hosted by Trixie and Tammie Brown	January 27, 2024	–
96	3	"Griselda"	Hosted by Trixie and Kim Chi	February 3, 2024	–
97	4	"Mea Culpa"	Hosted by Trixie and Meatball	March 2, 2024	–
98	5	"Love Is Blind"	Season 6	March 16, 2024	–
99	6	"3 Body Problem"	Season 1	March 30, 2024	–
100	7	"Physical: 100"	Season 2	April 6, 2024	–
101	8	"Dead Boy Detectives"	–	May 4, 2024	–
102	9	"Perfect Match"	Season 2	June 22, 2024	–
103	10	"A Family Affair"	–	July 6, 2024	–
104	11	"Baby Reindeer"	–	August 31, 2024	–
105	12	"Kath & Kim"	Seasons 1–4	September 28, 2024	–
106	13	"Don't Move"	–	October 31, 2024	–
107	14	"Woman of the Hour"	–	November 9, 2024	–
108	15	"The Merry Gentlemen"	–	November 30, 2024	–
109	16	"Our Little Secret"	–	December 14, 2024	–
110	17	"Interview with the Vampire"	Season 1	December 24, 2024	–
111	18	"The Great British Baking Show"	2023/24 New Year's Special	January 4, 2025	
112	19	"No Good Deed"	Season 1	January 18, 2025	
113	20	"Squid Game"	Season 2	January 25, 2025	

=== Season 7 (2025–2026) ===
No. overall	No. in season	Programming	Notes	Original release date	Ref
114	1	"Temptation Island"	Season 9	March 15, 2025	
115	2	"The Electric State"	–	March 22, 2025	
116	3	"The Residence"	–	April 5, 2025	
117	4	"Love on the Spectrum"	Season 3	April 19, 2025	
118	5	"Black Mirror"	Season 7	April 26, 2025	
119	6	"Fear Street: Prom Queen"	–	June 1, 2025	
120	7	"America's Sweethearts: Dallas Cowboys Cheerleaders"	Season 2	July 5, 2025	
121	8	"The Ultimatum: Queer Love"	Season 2	July 12, 2025	
122	9	"The Old Guard 2"	–	July 19, 2025	
123	10	"Too Much"	–	July 26, 2025	
124	11	"Happy Gilmore 2"	–	August 30, 2025	
125	12	"Yellowjackets"	Season 1	October 25, 2025	
126	13	"Frankenstein"	–	December 6, 2025	
127	14	"A Merry Little Ex-Mas"	–	December 13, 2025	
127	14	"Champagne Problems"	–	December 13, 2025	
127	14	"Jingle Bell Heist"	–	December 13, 2025	
127	14	"My Secret Santa"	–	December 13, 2025	
128	15	"The Hunting Wives"	Season 1	December 20, 2025	
129	16	"Wake Up Dead Man"	–	January 3, 2026	

=== Season 8 (2026) ===
No. overall	No. in season	Programming	Notes	Original release date	Ref
130	1	"The Boyfriend"	Season 2	March 7, 2026	
131	2	"Reality Check: Inside America's Next Top Model"	–	March 14, 2026	
132	3	"Love Is Blind"	Season 10	March 21, 2026	
133	4	"Age of Attraction"	Season 1	April 4, 2026	
134	5	"Heartstopper Forever"	–	August 8, 2026	
135	6	"Let's Marry Harry"	–	August 29, 2026	
136	7	"Heartbreak High"	Season 3	October 31, 2026	
137	8	"Cruel Intentions"	–	November 14, 2026	

== Awards and nominations ==
Year	Award	Category	Result	Ref.
2022	Webby Awards	Arts & Entertainment Social Video	Nominated	
2022	Webby Awards	Arts & Entertainment Social Video (People's Voice)	Won	
2023	Webby Awards	Television & Film, Social Video	Won	
2023	Webby Awards	Television & Film, Social Video (People's Voice)	Won	
2024	Webby Awards	Television & Film, Social Content Series (Social)	Won	

== I Like to Watch UK ==
A British version of the show, I Like to Watch UK, premiered on Netflix UK & Ireland's YouTube channel on March 25, 2020. It features The Vivienne from the first series of RuPaul's Drag Race UK in a similar format to the American version, joined by various guests. So far the series has also featured fellow RuPaul's Drag Race UK stars Baga Chipz, Cheryl Hole, Lawrence Chaney and Tia Kofi, as well as RuPaul's Drag Race All Stars winner Monét X Change, and television personality Kim Woodburn. A special 'on tour' edition of I Like to Watch UK featuring Tia Kofi & Layla Zee Susan, Blu Hydrangea & Gypsy Divine, and Cheryl Hole & Stacey Rhect premiered on New Year's Eve 2021 (regular host The Vivienne did not appear in this episode).

=== Episodes ===
No.	Programming reviewed	Guest	Original airdate
1	"Sex Education"	Baga Chipz	March 25, 2020
2	"Love Is Blind"	Baga Chipz	April 1, 2020
3	"Tiger King: Murder, Mayhem and Madness"	Baga Chipz	April 8, 2020
4	"The Stranger"	Baga Chipz	April 15, 2020
Bonus	"The Best Moments"	Baga Chipz	May 15, 2020
5	"The Crown"	Cheryl Hole	November 19, 2020
6	"The Christmas Chronicles 2"	Cheryl Hole	December 3, 2020
7	"The Prom"	Cheryl Hole	December 18, 2020
8	"Bridgerton"	Monét X Change	January 1, 2021
9	"Bonding"	Monét X Change	January 29, 2021
10	"Absolutely Fabulous and Sister, Sister"	Monét X Change	February 12, 2021
11	"Special"	Lawrence Chaney	May 14, 2021
12	"Eurovision Song Contest: The Story of Fire Saga"	Tia Kofi	May 21, 2021
13	"Army of the Dead"	Lawrence Chaney	May 28, 2021
14	"Too Hot to Handle"	Kim Woodburn	June 29, 2021
15	"Fear Street Part One: 1994"	Tia Kofi	July 8, 2021
16	"Sexy Beasts"	Cheryl Hole	July 21, 2021
Special	"Bird Box"	Various	December 31, 2021
