= Glow Up: Britain's Next Make-Up Star series 5 =

2023 series of Glow Up

Glow Up: Britain's Next Make-Up Star
- Series 5
- Presented by: Leomie Anderson
- Judges: Dominic Skinner; Val Garland
- No. of contestants: 10
- Winner: Saphron Morgan
- Runners-up: Roo, Axel Brown
- No. of episodes: 8

Release
- Original network: BBC Three
- Original release: 2 May – 21 June 2023

Series chronology
- ← Previous; Series 4 Next → Series 6

The fifth series of Glow Up: Britain's Next Make-Up Star began on 2 May 2023 on BBC Three, and concluded on 21 June 2023. The series was hosted by Leomie Anderson and was judged by industry professionals Dominic Skinner and Val Garland, the latter two having been the judges since the inception of the show in 2019.

== Contestants ==
Contestant	Age (Note: Ages stated are at time of contest)	Hometown	Profession	Outcome
Saphron Morgan	23	Essex	Pizza delivery driver and freelance MUA	Winner
Axel Brown	27	Dundee	Computer arts student	Runner-Up
Roo	24	London	Painter and decorator	Runner-Up
Kieran	23	Cheshire	Salon hairdresser and freelance MUA	4th Place
On-May Yeung	21	Glasgow	Student and retail MUA	5th Place
Wezley Webber	20	Weston-super-Mare	Freelance MUA	6th Place
Taisha Sherwood	23	London	Freelance MUA	7th Place
Sarah Agbiji	25	Manchester	Freelance MUA	8th Place
Howard Xiao	30	London	Retail MUA and assistant manager	9th Place
Morgan Keightley	19	Durham	Freelance MUA and beautician	10th Place
