= Rory Cowlam =

British veterinary surgeon, writer and television personality

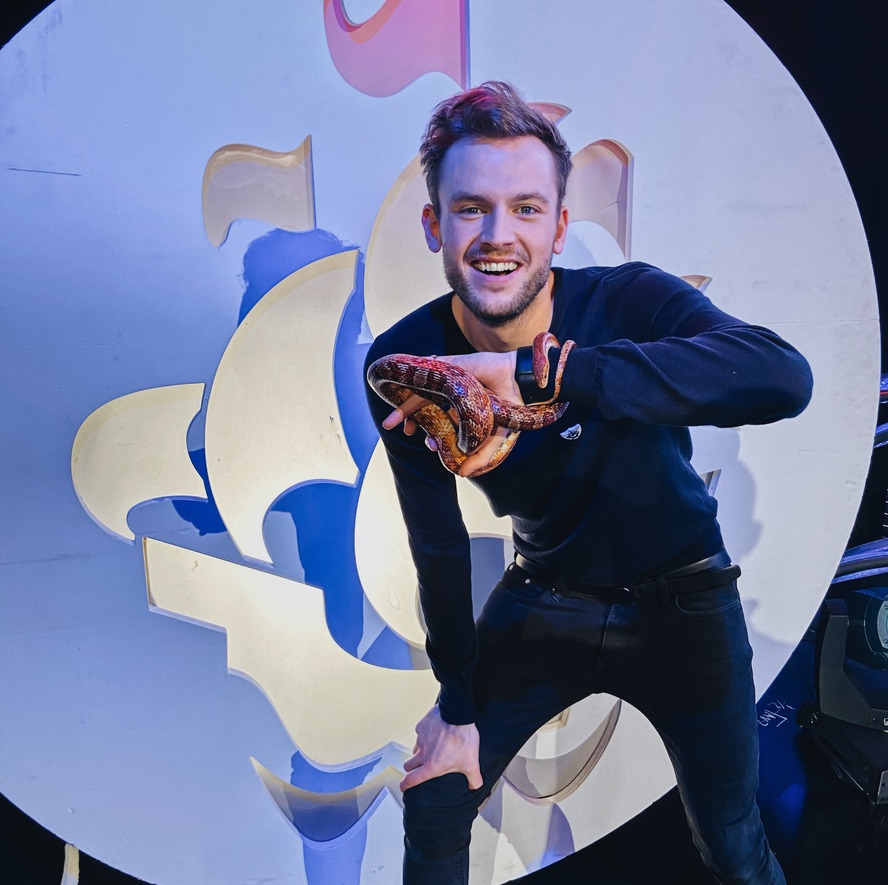
- Cowlam on the set of Blue Peter
- Born: Rory Cowlam; 27 August 1992 (age 33); Ascot, England
- Education: The Royal Veterinary College
- Occupations: Veterinary Surgeon; Writer; Television personality
- Years active: 2017–present
- Website: rorythevet.com

Rory Cowlam (born 27 August 1992), known as Rory the Vet, is a British veterinary surgeon, writer and television personality, who appeared on the CBBC documentary series The Pets Factor. He works as a vet in South London and is a co-founder of veterinary app VidiVet. In August 2020 his autobiography, The Secret Life of A Vet, was released, in which he discusses mental health in the veterinary profession. He is the resident vet for the television programme Blue Peter.

He is an ambassador for the RSPCA and Streetvet.

== Early life ==
Rory Cowlam was born in Ascot, Berkshire, but moved to the Cotswolds aged four, with his parents and younger sister. He attended Marling School in Stroud, and studied veterinary medicine at the Royal Veterinary College in London.

== Career ==
Cowlam’s first vet job was at an animal hospital in Kent. He then moved to a practice in South London, where he works as a surgeon, specialising in soft tissue operations.

In 2017 Cowlam appeared in the CBBC documentary series, The Pets Factor, which followed the work of five vets. Since then he has appeared on several television shows and documentaries providing veterinary advice, including Lorraine, Sky News and on Channel 5, as well as on radio programmes. Since 2019 he has been the resident vet for Blue Peter, with regular appearances on the show.

In August 2020 Cowlam's first book, The Secret Life of a Vet, was published by Hodder & Stoughton. It describes his journey to becoming a vet, with a focus on mental health in the veterinary profession.
