= Glow Up: Britain's Next Make-Up Star series 6 =

2024 series of Glow Up

Glow Up: Britain's Next Make-Up Star
- Series 6
- Presented by: Leomie Anderson
- Judges: Dominic Skinner; Val Garland
- No. of contestants: 8
- Winner: Shania
- Runners-up: Connor & Ella
- No. of episodes: 6

Release
- Original network: BBC Three
- Original release: 10 April – 22 May 2024

Series chronology
- ← Previous; Series 5

The sixth series of Glow Up: Britain's Next Make-Up Star premiered on 10 April 2024, on BBC Three and BBC iPlayer. The series saw Val Garland and Dominic Skinner return as judges whilst Leomie Anderson returned for her second series as presenter. Numerous industry professionals, including Nikkie de Jager, served as guest judges. The show had eight contestants taking part across six episodes with the finale airing on 22nd May 2024. The sixth series was won by Shania Parris, with the runners-up being Ella Freer & Connor McGee.

== Contestants ==
Contestant	Age (Note: Ages stated are at time of contest)	Hometown	Profession	Outcome
Shania	24	Coventry	Student	Winner
Connor	27	Kent	Beauty Manager & Dance Teacher	Runner-Up
Ella	20	Leicester	Student	Runner-Up
Jess	24	London	Social Media Assistant	4th Place
Finley	20	Dorset	Student	5th Place
Rossi	21	Surrey	Student	6th Place
George	27	Birmingham	Retail MUA	7th Place
Reem	22	Birmingham	Make-Up Artist	8th Place

== Contestant progress ==
Contestant	1	2	3	4	5	6
Shania	SAFE	WIN	SAFE	WIN	BTM2	Winner
Connor	SAFE	SAFE	WIN	SAFE	WIN	Runner-Up
Ella	SAFE	SAFE	SAFE	SAFE	WIN	Runner-Up
Jess	BTM2	SAFE	BTM2	BTM2	ELIM	
Finley	SAFE	BTM2	SAFE	ELIM		
Rossi	SAFE	SAFE	ELIM			
George	SAFE	ELIM				
Reem	ELIM					

The contestant won Glow Up.
The contestant was a runner-up.
The contestant came in third place.
The contestant won the challenge.
The contestant was originally in the red chair but later declared safe.
The contestant was originally safe but later up for elimination.
The contestant was in the red chair and still eligible for elimination.
The contestant was originally safe but later up for elimination and was then further eliminated.
The contestant won the challenge but was up for elimination, but not eliminated.
The contestant won the challenge but was eliminated.
The contestant decided to leave the competition before the face-off.
The contestant was in the red chair and then further eliminated.

== Face Offs ==
Episode	MUA			Challenge	Eliminated
1	Reem	vs	Jess	Produce a winged eye	Reem
2	Finley	vs	George	Create a glitter lash	George
3	Rossi	vs	Jess	Create a 'glazed apple' lip	Rossi
4	Finley	vs	Jess	Draw an arched brow above the natural brow	Finley
5	Jess	vs	Shania	Create a smoky eye with embellishments under the bottom lid	Jess

The contestant was eliminated after their first time in the face off.
The contestant was eliminated after their second time in the face off.
The contestant was eliminated after their third time in the face off.
The contestant was eliminated after their fourth time in the face off.
The contestant won the final face off and became Britain's Next Make-Up Star
