= 2009 British Academy Television Awards =

UK television awards ceremony

- Date: 26 April 2009
- Site: Royal Festival Hall, London
- Hosted by: Graham Norton

Highlights
- Best Comedy Series: Harry and Paul
- Best Drama: Wallander
- Best Actor: Stephen Dillane; The Shooting of Thomas Hurndall
- Best Actress: Anna Maxwell Martin; Poppy Shakespeare
- Best Comedy Performance: David Mitchell Peep Show

Television coverage
- Channel: BBC One
- Ratings: 4.42 million

The 2009 British Academy Television Awards were held on 26 April at the Royal Festival Hall in London. The event was broadcast live on BBC One and was hosted by Graham Norton. The nominations were announced on 24 March. Winners in bold.

== Nominations ==
- **Best Actor**
  - **Stephen Dillane** – **The Shooting of Thomas Hurndall** (Channel 4)
  - Jason Isaacs – The Curse of Steptoe (BBC Four)
  - Ken Stott – Hancock and Joan (BBC Four)
  - Ben Whishaw – Criminal Justice (BBC One)
- **Best Actress**
  - June Brown – EastEnders (BBC One)
  - **Anna Maxwell Martin** – **Poppy Shakespeare** (Channel 4)
  - Maxine Peake – Hancock and Joan (BBC One)
  - Andrea Riseborough – Margaret Thatcher: The Long Walk to Finchley (BBC Four)
- **Best Entertainment Performance**
  - Stephen Fry – QI (BBC One/Two)
  - **Harry Hill** – **Harry Hill's TV Burp** (ITV)
  - Anthony McPartlin and Declan Donnelly – I'm a Celebrity... Get Me Out of Here! (ITV)
  - Jonathan Ross – Friday Night with Jonathan Ross (BBC One)
- **Best Comedy Performance**
  - Rob Brydon – Gavin & Stacey (BBC Three)
  - Sharon Horgan – Pulling (BBC Three)
  - **David Mitchell** – **Peep Show** (Channel 4)
  - Claire Skinner – Outnumbered (BBC One)
- **Best Single Drama**
  - Einstein and Eddington (BBC Two)
  - Hancock and Joan (BBC Four)
  - The Shooting of Thomas Hurndall (Channel 4)
  - **White Girl** (BBC Two)
- **Best Drama Serial**
  - **Criminal Justice** (BBC One)
  - Dead Set (Channel 4)
  - The Devil's Whore (Channel 4)
  - House of Saddam (BBC Two)
- **Best Drama Series**
  - Doctor Who (BBC One)
  - Shameless (Channel 4)
  - Spooks (BBC One)
  - **Wallander** (BBC One)
- **Best Continuing Drama**
  - **The Bill** (ITV)
  - Casualty (BBC One)
  - EastEnders (BBC One)
  - Emmerdale (ITV)
- **Best Factual Series**
  - **Amazon with Bruce Parry** (BBC Two)
  - Blood, Sweat and T-shirts (BBC Three)
  - The Family (Channel 4)
  - Ross Kemp in Afghanistan (Sky One)
- **Best Entertainment Programme**
  - The Friday/Sunday Night Project (Channel 4)
  - Harry Hill's TV Burp (ITV)
  - QI (BBC One/Two)
  - **The X Factor** (ITV)
- **Best Situation Comedy**
  - The Inbetweeners (Channel 4)
  - **The IT Crowd** (Channel 4)
  - Outnumbered (BBC One)
  - Peep Show (Channel 4)
- **Best Comedy Programme**
  - **Harry and Paul** (BBC One)
  - The Peter Serafinowicz Show (BBC Two)
  - Star Stories (Channel 4)
  - That Mitchell and Webb Look (BBC Two)
- **Best Single Documentary**
  - A Boy Called Alex (Channel 4)
  - **Chosen** (Channel 4)
  - The Fallen (BBC Two)
  - Thriller in Manila (More4)
- **Best Feature**
  - The Apprentice (BBC One)
  - Celebrity Masterchef (BBC One)
  - **The Choir: Boys Don't Sing** (BBC Two)
  - Top Gear (BBC Two)
- **Best International Show**
  - The Daily Show with Jon Stewart (Comedy Central/More4)
  - Dexter (Showtime/ITV)
  - **Mad Men** (AMC/BBC Four)
  - The Wire (HBO/FX)
- **Best Specialist Factual**
  - **Life in Cold Blood** (BBC One)
  - Blood and Guts: A History of Surgery (BBC Four)
  - Lost Land of the Jaguar (BBC One)
  - Stephen Fry and the Gutenberg Press: The Machine That Made Us (BBC Four)
- **Best Current Affairs**
  - Dispatches – Mum Loves Drugs, Not Me (Channel 4)
  - **Dispatches – Saving Africa's Witch Children** (Channel 4)
  - Panorama – Omagh: What the Police Were Never Told (BBC One)
  - Ross Kemp: A Kenya Special (Sky One)
- **Best News Coverage**
  - Channel 4 News (ITN for Channel 4)
  - **News at Ten – 2008 Sichuan earthquake** (ITN for ITV)
  - Sky News – Canoe Man (Sky News)
  - Sky News – 2008 Mumbai attacks (Sky News)
- **Best Sport**
  - Cheltenham Gold Cup – Denman vs Kauto Star (Channel 4)
  - **ITV F1 – 2008 Brazilian Grand Prix** (ITV)
  - 2008 Summer Olympic Games – (BBC One)
  - Wimbledon – The Men's Final (BBC One)
- **Best Interactivity**
  - **Embarrassing Bodies Online** (Channel 4)
  - Bryony Makes a Zombie Movie (BBC Three)
  - Merlin (BBC One)
  - 2008 Summer Olympic Games (BBC One)
- **Phillips Audience Award**
  - **Skins** (E4)
  - The Apprentice (BBC One)
  - Coronation Street (ITV)
  - Outnumbered (BBC One)
  - Wallander (BBC One)
  - The X Factor (ITV)
- **BAFTA Fellowship**
  - Dawn French & Jennifer Saunders
