= Glow Up: Britain's Next Make-Up Star series 2 =

2020 series of Glow Up

Glow Up: Britain's Next Make-Up Star
- Series 2
- Presented by: Stacey Dooley
- Judges: Dominic Skinner; Val Garland
- No. of contestants: 10
- Winner: Ophelia Liu
- Runner-up: James Mac Inerney
- No. of episodes: 8

Release
- Original network: BBC Three
- Original release: 14 May – 2 July 2020

Series chronology
- ← Previous; Series 1 Next → Series 3

The second series of Glow Up: Britain's Next Make-Up Star began on 14 May 2020 on BBC Three, and concluded on 2 July 2020. The series was hosted by Stacey Dooley, and was judged by industry professionals Dominic Skinner and Val Garland. Various guest stars including Henry Holland and Michelle Visage appeared. The series was won by Ophelia Liu, with James Mac Inerney finishing as runner-up.

== Contestants ==
Contestant	Age (Note: Ages stated are at time of contest)	Hometown	Profession	Outcome
Ophelia Liu	25	London	Self-taught MUA	Winner
James Mac Inerney	25	London	Retail	Runner-up
Eve Jenkins	23	Liverpool	Salon worker	3rd place
Hannah Cunningham	25	Unknown	Office worker	4th place
Berny Ferr	22	Unknown	Unknown	5th place
Brandon Gaunt	25	London	MUA and hair stylist	6th place
Jake Oakley	19	Cambridge	Retail Assistant	7th place
Keziah Joy Saunders	21	Bournemouth	MUA and beauty influencer	8th place (Note: Keziah voluntarily quit the competition before the face-off.)
Shanice Croasdaile	25	Essex	MUA	9th place
Ashley H Mac	24	Scotland	MUA	10th place

== Contestant progress ==
Contestant	1	2	3 (Note: Keziah voluntarily quit the competition before the face off challenge.)	4	5	6 (Note: In episode 6, nobody went home as the Judges could not decide whom to send home.)	7	8 (Note: In this episode, in the final creative brief, one MUA was set to get a 15 minute penalty. However the judges did not give out a penalty therefore everyone was safe.)	
Ophelia	SAFE	SAFE	WIN	SAFE	WIN	SAFE	SAFE	SAFE	Winner
James	SAFE	SAFE	SAFE	WIN	BTM2	SAFE	SAFE	SAFE	Runner-up
Eve	SAFE	SAFE	SAFE	SAFE	WIN	WIN	WIN	SAFE	Third Place
Hannah	SAFE	SAFE	SAFE	BTM2	SAFE	BTM2	ELIM		
Berny	WIN	SAFE	BTM2	SAFE	ELIM				
Brandon	SAFE	WIN	SAFE	ELIM					
Jake	BTM2	SAFE	ELIM						
Keziah	SAFE	SAFE	QUIT						
Shanice	SAFE	ELIM							
Ashley	ELIM								

The contestant won Glow Up.
The contestant was a runner-up.
The contestant came in third place.
The contestant won the challenge.
The contestant was originally in the red chair but later declared safe.
The contestant was originally safe but later up for elimination.
The contestant was in the red chair and still eligible for elimination.
The contestant was originally safe but later up for elimination and was then further eliminated.
The contestant won the challenge but was up for elimination, but not eliminated.
The contestant won the challenge but was eliminated.
The contestant decided to leave the competition before the face-off.
The contestant was in the red chair and then further eliminated.

== Face offs ==
Episode	MUA			Challenge	Eliminated
1	Ashley	vs.	Jake	Produce an ombre lip	Ashley; H Mac
2	Brandon (Note: The MUA won the professional assignment but failed to impress in the Creative Brief so was then up for elimination.)	vs.	Shanice	Create realistic freckles	Shanice; Croasdaile
3	Berny	vs.	Jake	Produce a graphic liner	Jake; Oakley
4	Brandon	vs.	Hannah	Use three colours to creates a temple drape	Brandon; Gaunt
5	Berny	vs.	James	Create a copy of the opposite eye	Berny; Ferr
6	Eve	vs.	Hannah	Create a glitter lip	None (Note: In episode 6, nobody went home as the Judges could not decide whom to send home.)
7	Eve	vs.	Hannah	Create a rainbow eye	Hannah; Cunningham
Episode	MUA			Challenge	Winner Of Glow Up
8 (Note: This episode was the top two to decide the winner, instead of the bottom two to decide who goes home.)	James	vs.	Ophelia	Do a simple complete makeup	Ophelia; Liu

The contestant was eliminated after their first time in the face off.
The contestant was eliminated after their second time in the face off.
The contestant was eliminated after their third time in the face off.
The contestant won the final face off and became Britain’s Next Make Up Star.

== Guest judges ==
- Min Sandhu (Episode 1)
- Henry Holland (Episode 2)
- Ashley Roller (Episode 3)
- Michelle Visage (Episode 4)
- Andrew Gallimore (Episode 4)
- Megan Thomas (Episode 5)
- Lisa Armstrong (Episode 6)
- Rankin (Episode 7)
- Annalise Fard (Episode 8)
- Anastasia Soare (Episode 8)

=== Special guests ===
- Mario Dedivanovic

== Episodes ==
No. overall	No. in series	Title	Original release date
9	1	"Episode 1"	14 May 2020
Guest judge: Min Sandhu; Professional Assignment: Design gold and silver looks for an advertising campaign for sports fashion retailer JD Sports; Professional Assignment winner: Berny; Creative Brief: Produce a look on themselves based on their identity.; Bottom two: Jake and Ashley; Face Off Challenge: Produce an ombre lip.; Eliminated: Ashley
10	2	"Episode 2"	21 May 2020
Guest judge: Henry Holland; Professional Assignment: Come up with makeup looks for London Fashion Week; Professional Assignment winner: Brandon; Creative Brief: To create a look that represents their own personal icon; they could be famous, fictional, fantasy or someone they know.; Bottom two: Shanice and Brandon; Face Off Challenge: Create realistic freckles.; Eliminated: Shanice
11	3	"Episode 3"	28 May 2020
Guest judge: Ashley Roller; Professional Assignment: Replicate theatrical makeup at the West End musical The Lion King; Professional Assignment winner: Ophelia; Creative Brief: Create a look that incorporates a mask that reveals more than it hides.; Walked: Keziah; Bottom two: Jake and Berny; Face Off Challenge: Create an exaggerated eye using eyeliner.; Eliminated: Jake
12	4	"Episode 4"	4 June 2020
Guest judges: Michelle Visage and Andrew Gallimore; Professional Assignment: Design looks for a high fashion editorial with Attitude magazine; Professional Assignment winner: James; Creative Brief: Produce looks that look to the club kid scene.; Bottom two: Brandon and Hannah; Face Off Challenge: Use three colours to creates a temple drape.; Eliminated: Brandon
13	5	"Episode 5"	11 June 2020
Guest judge: Megan Thomas; Professional Assignment: Create prosthetic injury looks to be shown on Holby City; Professional Assignment winners: Eve and Ophelia; Creative Brief: Create a look that embodies their worst nightmare, fear or phobia.; Bottom two: Berny and James; Face Off Challenge: Replicate the opposite eye including rhinestones; Eliminated: Berny
14	6	"Episode 6"	18 June 2020
Guest judge: Lisa Armstrong; Professional Assignment: Design and execute the make-up for Movie Week on Strictly Come Dancing; Professional Assignment winner: Eve; Creative Brief: Transform a model in to a super hero.; Bottom two: Eve and Hannah; Face Off Challenge: Produce a glitter lip.; Eliminated: None (Note: As the judges could not agree on whom to eliminate, both Eve and Hannah advanced to the semi-final.)
15	7	"Episode 7"	25 June 2020
Guest judge: Rankin; Professional Assignment: Design a look in line with the concept of the future.; Professional Assignment winner: Eve; Creative Brief: Design and create a look based on one of the four classical elements; earth, wind, air and fire.; Bottom two: Eve and Hannah; Face Off Challenge: Produce a rainbow eye.; Eliminated: Hannah
16	8	"Episode 8"	2 July 2020
Guest judges: Annalise Fard and Anastasia Soare; Professional Assignment: Host a make-up masterclass with an audience of industry professionals, influencers and reporters.; Creative Brief: Create a look with a theme of evolution.; Face Off Challenge: "Full beat" face, with a smokey eye and a bold red lip.; Third Place: Eve; Runner-up: James; Winner: Ophelia
