= Maya Jama =

British broadcaster (born 1994)

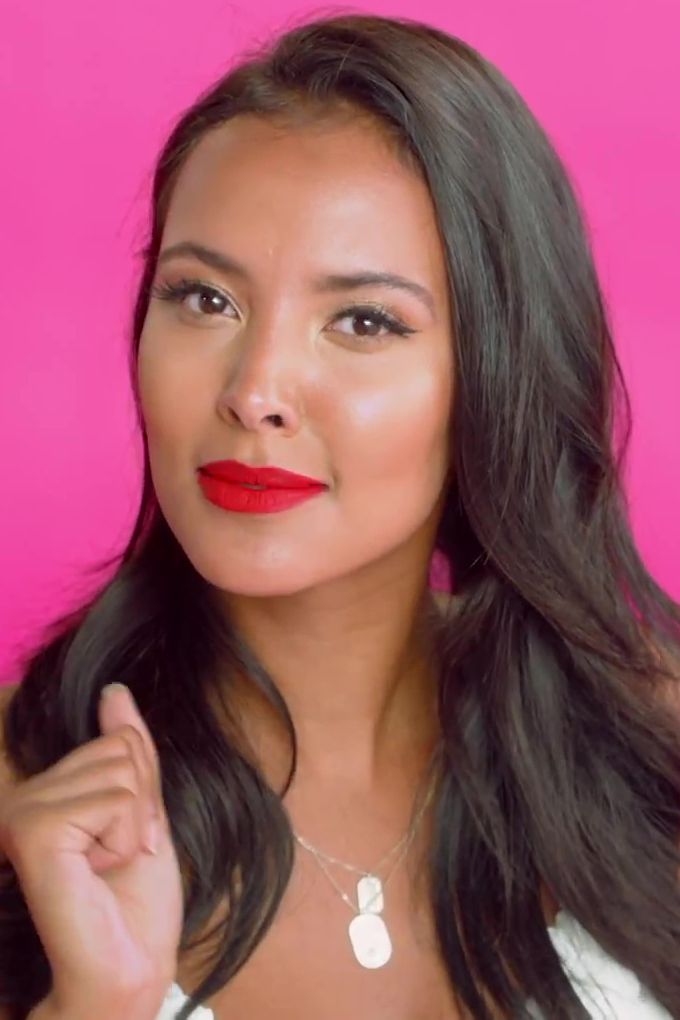
- Jama in 2018
- Born: Maya Indea Jama; 14 August 1994 (age 32); Bristol, England
- Occupations: Broadcaster; media personality
- Years active: 2012–present
- Website: mayajama.co.uk

Maya Indea Jama (/ˈdʒɑːmə/ MY-AH JAH-mə; born 14 August 1994) is a British broadcaster and media personality. She began her career as a presenter for MTV, 4Music and BBC Radio 1. She has presented television shows, including The Circle (2017), Glow Up: Britain's Next Make-Up Star (2021–2022), and Love Island (2023–2026). Since 2025, Jama has appeared as a panellist on the ITV musical competition The Masked Singer. In 2026, she was a contestant on the second series of the BBC reality show The Celebrity Traitors.

Jama hosted #DriveWithMaya on Rinse FM from 2014 to 2017, and co-presented Radio 1's Greatest Hits and presented her eponymous show, Maya Jama, on BBC Radio 1 from 2018 to 2020.

== Early life ==
Maya Indea Jama was born on 14 August 1994 in Bristol, England. She moved to her mother's home country of Sweden as a baby, where she attended nursery, before the family returned to Bristol. Jama grew up in Bristol and attended Cotham School. She is of Somali descent on her father's side, while her mother is of Swedish and Scottish descent. Her mother, Sadie Li Hadden, was 19 when she gave birth to Jama and she named her after the American author and poet Maya Angelou. Jama also has a brother.

Jama's father was imprisoned for much of her childhood for violence-related offences, including pub brawls and fights. Aged 12, she stopped visiting him in prison and had no contact with him for a decade. In a 2017 interview with The Guardian, Jama said that she did not regard his imprisonment as a significant problem during her childhood, as his side of the family supported her and her brother. While working on the documentary When Dads Kill in 2017, which explored the experiences of young people with circumstances similar to her own, Jama re-examined her relationship with her father, who had by then been released from prison. She met him in an attempt to understand why he had been imprisoned, but said that neither he nor his family provided her with an explanation.

Jama remains close to her mother; the two occasionally appear on talk shows together and attend private celebrity events.

== Career ==
=== Television ===
In 2012, Jama moved to London to pursue a media career, first as an actress, then as a TV presenter and fashion model. Acting had been Jama's first ambition, but she realised that becoming a presenter might suit her better. Her early role models included Davina McCall and June Sarpong. Jama began her presenting debut as a teenager, presenting the weekly music video countdown on JumpOff.TV, and later worked for Sky UK on TRACE Sports.

In 2014, she hosted Maya's FIFA World Cup Cities for Copa90, a travelogue covering the 2014 FIFA World Cup in Brazil. She also co-hosted the Copa90 nine-part World Cup Taxi series dedicated to the event. In August 2014, Jama joined MTV as a presenter for The Wrap Up.

In February 2017, she worked closely with Brit Awards, hosting their 2017 Pre-Brit Awards Party and hosting a Facebook live stream from the red carpet. In September 2017, she co-presented the Saturday night game show Cannonball on ITV with Andrew Flintoff, Frankie Bridge, Radzi Chinyanganya and Ryan Hand. In September 2017 and February 2018, Jama was a guest panellist on ITV's Loose Women. In November 2017, she became the youngest person (then 23) to co-host the MOBO Awards on Channel 5 with fellow presenter Marvin Humes.

In September 2018, Jama co-presented the first series of The Circle on Channel 4 with Alice Levine. In October 2018, she co-presented Stand Up to Cancer with long-standers Alan Carr and Adam Hills, and became the team captain on ITV2 rap panel show Don't Hate the Playaz presented by Jordan Stephens. In 2019, she appeared on A League of Their Own Road Trip alongside actor and comedian Tom Davis. She appeared on Channel 4's The Big Fat Quiz of the Year in 2019 and 2020.

In early June 2020, she presented the Saturday evening BBC One TV programme Peter Crouch: Save Our Summer. Later that year she co-presented BBC One's New Year's Eve programme The Big New Year's In. In January 2021, the BBC announced that Jama would be the new presenter of Glow Up: Britain's Next Make-Up Star, replacing former presenter Stacey Dooley, who presented the first two series of the programme. In February 2021, Jama appeared as a celebrity guest judge during the second series of RuPaul's Drag Race UK. In September 2021, it was announced that Jama would be the host of Simon Cowell's new music competition gameshow Walk The Line.

In October 2022, it was announced that Jama would take over from Laura Whitmore as the presenter of ITV2 dating reality series Love Island. In August 2023, Jama was announced as the host of Love Island Games, a global spin-off show. In November 2026, Jama announced that she had stepped down as presenter of Love Island.

Jama appeared on the second series of The Celebrity Traitors, which began in October 2026.

=== Radio ===
Between 2014 and 2017, she hosted #DriveWithMaya, a weekday drive time show on Rinse FM.

In January 2018, she joined BBC Radio 1, presenting Radio 1's Greatest Hits on Saturdays and co-presenting every Friday with Scott Mills and Chris Stark. From 2018 to 2020, she presented her own show, Maya Jama on Fridays and Saturdays on BBC Radio 1.

On 15 May 2020, the BBC confirmed in a statement that Jama had left Radio 1 after two years. It said she had made "the difficult decision not to continue her Radio 1 contract" and her final show was already broadcast on 3 May 2020. In an Instagram post, Jama said she had "a lot of exciting commitments" planned for the future, which meant she could not continue with her broadcasting segment at Radio 1. She added: "I would like to thank the team for their hard work and friendship during the last two years."

Year	Title	Role	Slot	Station
2014–2017	#DriveWithMaya	Presenter	4–7pm Weekdays	Rinse FM
2018	Scott Mills	Co-presenter	1–4pm Fridays	BBC Radio 1
2018–2020	Radio 1's Greatest Hits	Presenter	10–11am Fridays and Saturdays	BBC Radio 1
2018–2020	Maya Jama	Presenter	11am–1pm Fridays and Saturdays	BBC Radio 1

=== Other work ===
From September 2017, Jama hosted When Life Gives You Melons, a podcast available to streaming platforms in partnership with Freya. The podcast featured Jama interviewing all-female guests about work, life and relationships. Guests included Cherry Healey, Vick Hope, Anna Richardson, Vanessa White, Katie Piper, Gemma Cairney and Laura Whitmore.

That same year, Jama became an ambassador for Savera UK which operates across the United Kingdom to provide services to individuals who have experienced or are at risk of ‘Honour’ Based Abuse (HBA) and Harmful Practices. In June 2019, she donated blood for an NHS campaign and was found to have the rare and in demand Ro blood subtype.

She also launched a successful clothing collection with PrettyLittleThing in June 2018, followed by a second collection in February 2019. She is an ambassador for Adidas, and appeared in the European JD Sports Christmas campaign, and is also an ambassador for the American hair care brand Aussie. She also appeared in a global GAP campaign and in a Spring/Summer 2019 campaign for Kurt Geiger. In December 2020, Jama launched her own face and eye masks range, MIJ Masks, with the first release selling out within 24 hours.

In March 2024, Jama hosted the BRIT Awards alongside Roman Kemp and Clara Amfo.

In November 2024, it was announced that she would be managing one of the 12 teams in the Baller League UK, a six-a-side football league. With Alisha Lehmann, she jointly managed MVPs United in seasons 1 and 2 (2025–26).

== Personal life ==
Jama lives in Alderley Edge, Cheshire. She is a keen football fan and supports Bristol Rovers and West Ham United.

After meeting in October 2014, Jama was in a relationship with British rapper Stormzy from January 2015 to August 2019; their break-up inspired his December 2019 song "Lessons". In July 2021, it was reported Jama was dating NBA player Ben Simmons. In August 2022, the couple reportedly ended their engagement, having become engaged at the end of 2021. In August 2023, Jama reunited with Stormzy. On 17 July 2024, the couple announced that they had separated again, stating jointly on Instagram, "We tried, and it didn't work, and that's okay."

In March 2025, Gary Lineker said in an online video that Jama was dating Portuguese professional footballer Rúben Dias. Dias confirmed that the couple had separated in May 2026.

== Filmography ==
Year	Title	Role	Notes
2014	Maya's FIFA World Cup Cities	Presenter	
2015–2017	Trending Live!	Presenter	Regular presenter
2016	The Hot Desk	Presenter	1 episode
2017–2018	Loose Women	Panelist	
2017	Cannonball	Co-presenter	1 series
2017	The Weakest Link Celebrity Special	Contestant	Raising money for Children in Need
2017	MOBO Awards	Co-host	Awards ceremony
2018	True Love or True Lies	Presenter	1 series
2018	Revolution	Co-presenter	1 series
2018	The Circle	Co-presenter	1 series
2018	Stand Up to Cancer	Co-presenter	Biennial beneficial charity show
2018–2022	Don't Hate the Playaz	Team Captain	3 series
2018–2019	BBC Radio 1 Teen Awards	Co-presenter	Annually
2019	The Big Narstie Show	Guest	Season 2, Episode 5
2019	The Jonathan Ross Show	Guest	Series 15, Episode 6
2019	Big Fat Quiz of the Year 2019	Team Member	26 December 2019
2020	Sport Relief		
2020	EE BAFTA	Presenter	
2020	Peter Crouch: Save Our Summer	Co-host	1 series
2020	The Duchess	Sandra	Acting role
2020–present	Soccer Aid	Pundit	
2020	MOBO Awards	Co-host	Awards ceremony
2020	Sunday Brunch	Guest	1 episode
2020	The Jonathan Ross Show	Guest	Series 16, Episode 10
2020	Big Fat Quiz of the Year 2020	Team member	26 December 2020
2020	The Big New Year's In	Co-presenter	31 December 2020
2021	RuPaul's Drag Race UK	Guest Judge	BBC Three; Series 2, Episode 7: "Lockdown Supersheroes"
2021	Celebrity Juice	Panellist	Series 25 only
2021	Big Zuu's Big Eats	Guest	Spring 2021
2021–2022	Glow Up: Britain's Next Make-Up Star	Presenter	Series 3–4
2021	Redknapp's Big Night Out	Guest	22 April 2021
2021	Crouchy's Year-Late Euros: Live	Co-presenter	June 2021; 10-part series
2021	Celebrity Gogglebox	Herself	Series 3, Episode 9 (Black To Front Special)
2021	Foxy's Fearless 48 Hours With...	Herself	Episode 2
2021	Stand Up to Cancer 2021	Co-presenter	15 October 2021
2021	Walk The Line	Presenter	
2021–present	The Brits Are Coming	Co-presenter	
2023–2026	Love Island	Presenter	Series 9–13
2023	Love Island Games	Presenter	Global All Stars spin-off
2024–2026	Love Island: All Stars	Presenter	Series 1–3
2024	The BRIT Awards	Co-host	Co-hosted with Roman Kemp and Clara Amfo
2024	Comic Relief	Co-presenter	
2025–present	The Masked Singer	Panelist	Series 6–present
2026	The Celebrity Traitors	Contestant	Series 2
2026	The Gentlemen	Aisha	Series 2

== Awards ==
In November 2019, she won the People's Choice Award for best dressed star. Jama later opened and hosted the 2020 EE BAFTA red carpet in a 5G powered augmented reality dress. In April 2024, she was listed in Forbes 30 Under 30 Europe.
