= Glow Up: Britain's Next Make-Up Star series 1 =

2019 series of Glow Up

Glow Up: Britain's Next Make-Up Star
- Series 1
- Presented by: Stacey Dooley
- Judges: Dominic Skinner; Val Garland
- No. of contestants: 10
- Winner: Ellis Crawford
- Runner-up: Nikki Patel
- No. of episodes: 8

Release
- Original network: BBC Three
- Original release: 6 March – 24 April 2019

Series chronology
- Next → Series 2

The first series of Glow Up: Britain's Next Make-Up Star began on 6 March 2019 on BBC Three, and concluded on 24 April 2019. The series was hosted by Stacey Dooley, and was judged by industry professionals Dominic Skinner and Val Garland. Various guest stars including David Malinowski and NikkieTutorials appeared. The series was won by Ellis Atlantis, with Nikki Patel as runner-up and Leigh Easthope in third place.

== Contestants ==
(Ages stated are at time of contest)

Summary of contestants from Series 1 of Glow Up
| Contestant | Age | Hometown | Profession | Competition; Outcome |
|---|---|---|---|---|
| Ellis Crawford | 24 | Bradford | Retail assistant, drag queen | Winner |
| Nikki Patel | 29 | London | Make-up artist, influencer | Runner-up |
| Leigh Easthope | 28 | Manchester | Freelance make-up artist, painter | 3rd Place |
| Belinda Chatterton | 25 | Newcastle | Care worker | 4th Place |
| Tiffany Hunt | 23 | Nottingham | Make-up artist | 5th Place |
| Steph Harrison | 27 | Birmingham | Specialist hair and media make-up student | 6th Place |
| Brana Alunan | 21 | Blackpool | Make-up artist | 7th Place |
| Paige Cole | 20 | London | Retail assistant | 8th Place |
| Mathieu Dausmann | 27 | London | Special effects make-up artist | 9th Place |
| Dina Schofield | 19 | Manchester | Supermarket customer assistant | 10th Place |

- ^Note 1: Brana was known as Brandon on Series 1, before transitioning.

== Contestant progress ==
| Contestant | 1 | 2 | 3 | 4 | 5 | 6 (Note: Nikki was the only artist in the red chair originally.) | 7 | 8 | |
|---|---|---|---|---|---|---|---|---|---|
| Ellis | SAFE | WIN | SAFE | WIN | SAFE | SAFE | SAFE | SAFE | Winner |
| Nikki | SAFE | SAFE | SAFE | BTM2 | BTM2 | BTM2 | BTM2 | SAFE | Runner-up |
| Leigh | SAFE | SAFE | BTM2 | SAFE | WIN | SAFE | WIN | SAFE | Third Place |
| Belinda | SAFE | WIN | SAFE | SAFE | SAFE | WIN | ELIM | | |
| Tiffany | SAFE | SAFE | WIN | SAFE | SAFE | ELIM | | | |
| Steph | SAFE | SAFE | SAFE | SAFE | ELIM | | | | |
| Brana | BTM2 | BTM2 | WIN | ELIM | | | | | |
| Paige | WIN | SAFE | ELIM | | | | | | |
| Mathieu | SAFE | ELIM | | | | | | | |
| Dina | ELIM | | | | | | | | |

The contestant won Glow Up.
The contestant was a runner-up.
The contestant came in third place.
The contestant won the challenge.
The contestant was originally in the red chair but later declared safe.
The contestant was originally safe but later up for elimination.
The contestant was originally safe but later up for elimination and was then further eliminated.
The contestant was in the red chair and still eligible for elimination.
The contestant won the challenge but was up for elimination, but not eliminated.
The contestant won the challenge but was eliminated.
The contestant decided to leave the competition.
The contestant was in the red chair and was then further eliminated.

== Face offs ==
The face off is a mini challenge lasting 10 minutes. After then 10 minutes the judges will choose who will get eliminated and who will stay in the competition. The challenge content normally focuses on one section of the face (e.g. Lips, Eyes).

| Episode | MUA | | | Challenge | Eliminated |
|---|---|---|---|---|---|
| 1 | Brana | vs. | Dina | Create a perfect black lip | Dina |
| 2 | Brana | vs. | Mathieu | Use five tools to create a complete look (Note: This challenge lasted 5 minutes instead of 10) | Mathieu |
| 3 | Leigh | vs. | Paige | Create a colorful cut crease eye (Note: This challenge lasted 12 minutes instead of 10) | Paige |
| 4 | Brana | vs. | Nikki | Apply a perfect black winged liner | Brana |
| 5 | Steph | vs. | Nikki | Create and apply a big "drag" eyelash set | Steph |
| 6 | Tiffany | vs. | Nikki | Replicate an eyeshadow look | Tiffany |
| 7 | Belinda | vs. | Nikki | Draw on a thin, arched "1930's brow" | Belinda |
| Episode | MUA | | | Challenge | Winner Of Glow Up |
| 8 (Note: This episode was the top two to decide the winner, instead of a bottom two to decide who goes home.) | Ellis | vs. | Nikki | Create a complete makeup look of your choice in 45 minutes | Ellis |

The contestant was eliminated after their first time in the face off.
The contestant was eliminated after their second time in the face off.
The contestant was eliminated after their third time in the face off.
The contestant won the final face off and became Britain’s First Make Up Star.

== Guest judges ==
- Lisa Oxenham (Episode 1)
- David Malinowski (Episode 2)
- NikkieTutorials (Episode 3)
- Caroline Barnes (Episode 4)
- Kim Chi (Episode 5)
- Lan Nguyen-Grealis (Episode 6)
- Rankin (photographer) (Episode 8)

=== Special guests ===
- Amy-Leigh Hickman
- Anne Hegerty
- Arielle Free
- Chizzy Akudolu
- Gemma Atkinson
- Sunetra Sarker
- Yazmin Oukhellou

== Episodes ==
| No. overall | No. in series | Title | Original release date |
|---|---|---|---|
| 1 | 1 | "Episode 1" | 6 March 2019 |
Guest judge: Lisa Oxenham; Professional Assignment: Produce a beauty editorial shoot for Marie Claire; Professional Assignment Winner: Paige; Creative Brief: Produce a look on what beauty means to them.; Bottom two: Brana and Dina; Face Off Challenge: Create a perfect black lip; Eliminated: Dina
| 2 | 2 | "Episode 2" | 13 March 2019 |
Guest judge: David Malinowski; Professional Assignment: Working in teams, using prosthetics, bring two characters to life.; Professional Assignment Winner: Belinda, Ellis and Mathieu; Creative Brief: Make a look by dreaming up their own character which could belong in their favourite childhood story.; Bottom two: Brana and Mathieu; Face Off Challenge: Use five tools to create a complete look; Eliminated: Mathieu
| 3 | 3 | "Episode 3" | 20 March 2019 |
Guest judge: NikkieTutorials; Professional Assignment: Produce a make-up challenge video that has the potential to go viral.; Professional Assignment Winner: Brana and Tiffany; Creative Brief: Reflect on their strengths and weaknesses by creating a ‘two-faced’ look; Bottom two: Leigh and Paige; Face Off Challenge: Create a colorful cut crease eye; Eliminated: Paige
| 4 | 4 | "Episode 4" | 27 March 2019 |
Guest judge: Caroline Barnes; Professional Assignment: Create looks based on a celebrities brief. Then do that look on that celebrity for the TV Choice Awards.; Professional Assignment Winner: Ellis; Creative Brief: Produce a look only using monochromatic looks.; Bottom two: Brana and Nikki; Face Off Challenge: Apply a perfect black winged liner; Eliminated: Brana
| 5 | 5 | "Episode 5" | 3 April 2019 |
Guest judge: Kim Chi; Professional Assignment: Replicate make up on West End drag performers in the Oliver Award-winning musical Kinky Boots.; Professional Assignment Winner: Leigh; Creative Brief: Produce gender transformation drag looks.; Bottom two: Nikki and Steph; Face Off Challenge: Create and apply a big "drag" eyelash set; Eliminated: Steph
| 6 | 6 | "Episode 6" | 10 April 2019 |
Guest judge: Lan Nguyen-Grealis; Professional Assignment: Do make up on models for London Fashion Week.; Professional Assignment Winner: Belinda; Creative Brief: Produce a look based on a designers brief that goes with their designs.; Bottom two: Nikki and Tiffany; Face Off Challenge: Replicate an eyeshadow look; Eliminated: Tiffany
| 7 | 7 | "Semi Final" | 17 April 2019 |
Professional Assignment: Create two looks baced on a specific era of song.; Professional Assignment Winner: Leigh; Creative Brief: Produce a look based on their favourite song.; Bottom two: Belinda and Nikki; Face Off Challenge: Draw on a thin, arched "1930's brow"; Eliminated: Belinda
| 8 | 8 | "Final" | 24 April 2019 |
Guest judge: Rankin (photographer); Professional Assignment: Create make-up looks for the shoot. Each must plan, pitch and then produce a unique look that meets the approval of the Magazines directors.; Creative Brief: Create a futuristic look that tells the story of their hopes and dreams for the future; Third Place: Leigh; Runner-up: Nikki; Winner: Ellis
