= Turi King =

Canadian-British professor of genetics

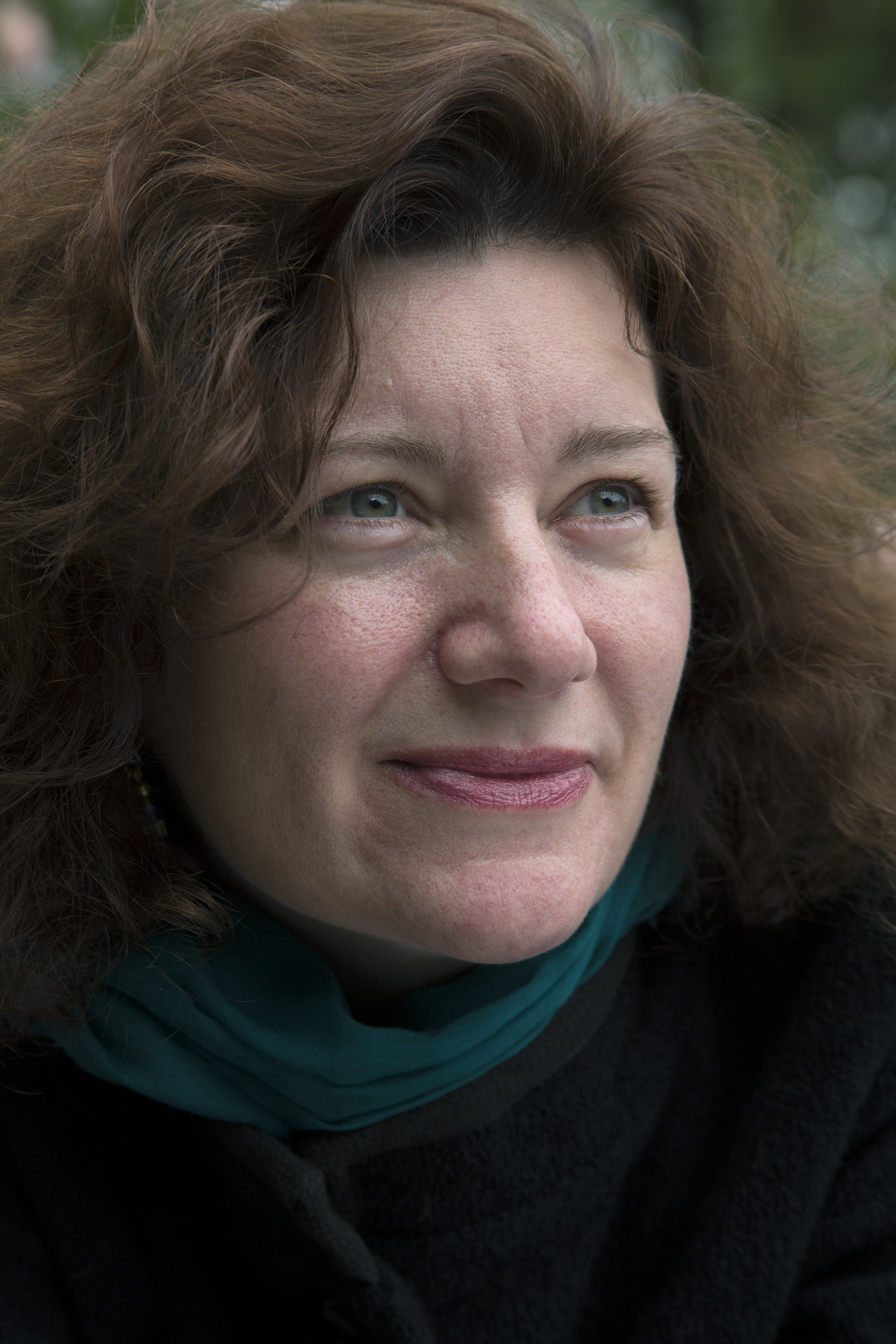
- King in 2015
- Born: Turi Emma King; 31 December 1969 (age 56); Nottingham, England
- Education: Point Grey Secondary School
- Alma mater: University of Cambridge (BA); University of Leicester (MSc, PhD)
- Known for: Richard III forensic DNA investigation; DNA Family Secrets
- Awards: Haldane Lecture (2018)
- Scientific career
- Fields: Genetics; Ancient DNA; Archaeogenetics; Archaeology; History
- Workplaces: University of Bath; University of Leicester
- Thesis: The relationship between British surnames and Y-chromosomal haplotypes (2008)
- Academic advisors: Alec Jeffreys
- Website: www.turiking.co.uk

Turi Emma King (born 31 December 1969) is a professor and Director of the Milner Centre for Evolution at the University of Bath. She was previously Professor of Public Engagement and Genetics at the University of Leicester. In 2012, King led the DNA verification during the exhumation and reburial of Richard III of England. In 2025, King led the analysis of Adolf Hitler's DNA, which indicated that he likely suffered from Kallmann syndrome; some scientists have criticised the results as speculative while joining King in cautioning against presuming biological determinism.

Alongside being an academic, King is known as a broadcaster, featuring with Stacey Dooley on the BBC Two genealogy series, DNA Family Secrets, presenting Ancient Murders Unearthed for Sky History and hosting the podcast Head Number 7 for Wondery.

== Early life and education ==
King was born in Nottingham, England, as the eldest of three children born to Alan King, an engineer, and Daphne King, a housewife. King is named after Norwegian aviator Turi Widerøe, the first woman to fly for a Western airline.

She moved to Canada at an early age and was brought up in Vancouver, British Columbia. She was educated at Point Grey Secondary School and worked on archaeological sites in Canada, Greece, and England, before studying at the University of Cambridge where she was an undergraduate student at Jesus College, Cambridge reading Archaeology and Anthropology. She was awarded a Bachelor of Arts degree in 1996. She won a scholarship to study for a Master of Science degree in Molecular Genetics at the University of Leicester, gaining a First with Distinction.

In 2000, she started her doctoral research as a Wellcome Trust Prize Student at the University of Leicester, specialising in genetic genealogy and "in tracing migration patterns by using genetics." Alec Jeffreys, the inventor of DNA fingerprinting, served on her PhD supervisory panel.

Her thesis on the relationship between British surnames and Y-chromosomal haplotypes was published in 2007, and eventually formed the basis of the book Surnames, DNA and Family History, which she co-authored with David Hey and George Redmonds.

== Career and research ==
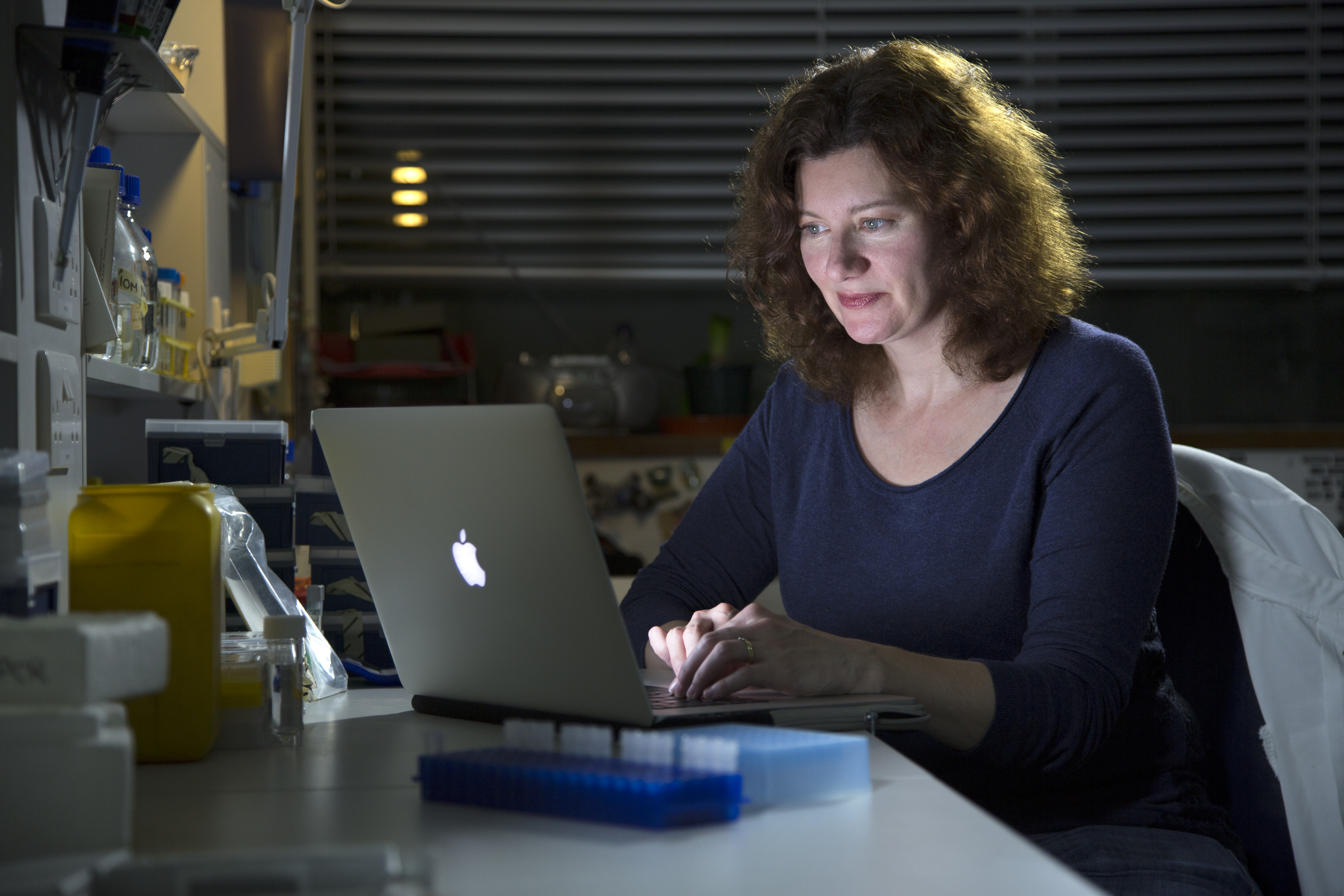
King working in the laboratory

King's research initially centered around genetics, genetic genealogy, forensics, and surnames, and using aspects of human DNA such as the Y chromosome to track past human migrations. Her work has included tracing "the signal of the Viking migration to the north of England", resulting in her appearance in Michael Wood's The Great British Story – A People's History on BBC Two, and in Michael Wood's Story of England.

In 2012, she led the genetic analysis and verification during the exhumation and reburial of Richard III of England. She was able to use the mitochondrial DNA (mtDNA) from direct living descendants of Richard III's sister, Anne of York, one of whom (Michael Ibsen) was traced by British historian John Ashdown-Hill, with a second relative (Wendy Duldig) traced by the University of Leicester team.

In March 2021, she presented the BBC Radio 4 documentary "Genetics and the longer arm of the law".

=== DNA Family Secrets ===
DNA Family Secrets is a television series which began airing on BBC Two in March 2021, presented by Stacey Dooley and King, it uses current DNA technology to solve family mysteries around ancestry, missing relatives and genetic disease. Series three aired in 2023.

=== Hitler's DNA: Blueprint of a Dictator ===
In 2025, King analyzed blood from the sofa in Adolf Hitler's study where eyewitnesses reported seeing his body. The results were not immediately peer-reviewed, but were the subject of a two-part Channel 4 documentary titled Hitler's DNA: Blueprint of a Dictator. The blood was confirmed to be Hitler's by comparing it to that of a relative with shared paternal ancestry. Analysis of the genetic material revealed that he likely suffered from Kallmann syndrome, a genetic disorder that hinders puberty. Many males with the syndrome have an undescended testicle and 10 percent have a micropenis; most have low testosterone levels. An additional symptom of Kallmann syndrome is a reduced or total lack of a sense of smell. Hitler was also predisposed to certain psychiatric spectrum disorders, but King emphasized that one's genetic disposition does not mean they will develop those traits, calling the doctrine of biological determinism "wrong". Psychologist Simon Baron-Cohen elaborated on the program that even those diagnosed with such mental traits are almost all "neither violent nor cruel".

Both the analysis and its presentation in the documentary have been criticised by several geneticists and science writers as speculative and overly sensational, with some joining the presenters in cautioning against biological determinism and reading too much into polygenic risk scores.

=== Other TV, video and radio appearances ===
King has appeared in numerous television and radio documentaries, programmes and videos as well as advising on television and radio productions such as BBC's Who Do You Think You Are?

- Presented the series Ancient Murders Unearthed for Sky History.
- Presented the BBC Radio 4 documentary: Genetics and the longer arm of the law
- Guest on The Life Scientific as DNA Detective Turi King
- Britain's Lost Battlefields with Rob Bell
- Richard III: The King in the Car Park
- Britain's Secret Treasures
- Richard III: Solving a 500 Year Old Cold Case (TEDx Leicester)
- Richard III – The DNA Analysis & Conclusion (University of Leicester)
- Richard III: The Resolution of A 500-Year-Old Cold Case (Irving K. Barber Learning Centre Lecture, UBC)
- Head Number 7 for Wondery

=== Public speaking and consultancy ===
As Professor of Public Engagement, King regularly undertakes public speaking at universities, schools and public events such as the Cheltenham Science Festival, the Moscow Science Festival, a Congressional Breakfast on Capitol Hill, the Galway Science and Technology Festival, and the Queen's Lecture in Berlin. She guest-presented the Royal Institution's Christmas Lectures in Japan in 2019 stepping in for Alice Roberts.

She advises on numerous television programmes and provides genetic expertise to authors such as Patricia Cornwell, Philippe Sands, Edward Glover, and David McKie.

King has also appeared in a number of television and radio documentaries as an expert in genetic genealogy, forensics, and/or ancient DNA.

=== Research ===
The following is a list of projects King is either heading or has been involved with:

- The King's DNA: whole genome sequencing of Richard III
- What's in a Name? Applying Patrilineal Surnames to Forensics, Population History, and Genetic Epidemiology
- HALOGEN (History, Archaeology, Linguistics, Onomastics, and GENetics)
- The Irish Surnames Project
- The Mary Jane Kelly Project, dedicated to confirming the identity of Jack the Ripper's final confirmed victim.

=== Awards and honours ===
In 2016, King was appointed an honorary Fellow of the British Science Association in recognition of her contribution to public engagement in science. She gave the J. B. S. Haldane prize lecture of The Genetics Society in 2018, at the Royal Institution, London. She served as president of the Adelphi Genetics Forum, formerly the Galton Institute, from 2020 to 2022.

== Personal life ==
King is married.
