= Stacey Dooley Sleeps Over =

- Starring: Stacey Dooley
- Country of origin: United Kingdom
- No. of series: 4
- No. of episodes: 19

Original release
- Network: U&W
- Release: 4 September 2019 – present

Stacey Dooley Sleeps Over is a British documentary television series which is broadcast on U&W.

In each episode, presenter Stacey Dooley stays for 72 hours at the house of an unusual family.

The show has had four series, the first airing in 2019 and the latest in 2025.

In 2023, Stacey Dooley Sleeps Over: USA was first aired, where Stacey visits families in America, with two series having aired to date.

== Episodes ==
=== Series 1 ===
No.	Title	Original release date
1	"Open marriage"	4 September 2019
2	"The Family Who Live Online"	11 September 2019
3	"The Family Without Rules"	18 September 2019
4	"Cage-Fighting Teen"	25 September 2019
5	"Mormons"	2 October 2019
6	"Landed Gentry"	9 October 2019

=== Series 2 ===
No.	Title	Original release date
1	"Trad Wife"	3 May 2021
2	"Child Model"	10 May 2021
3	"Eco Warriors"	17 May 2021
4	"The British Lion King"	24 May 2021
5	"Strictly Orthodox Jews"	31 May 2021
6	"Living With Down's Syndrome"	6 June 2021

=== Series 3 ===
No.	Title	Original release date
1	"Body Positive Warrior (International Women's Day Special)"	8 March 2022
2	"Britain's Most Hated Woman?"	11 April 2022
3	"70-Year-Old Dominatrix"	18 April 2022
4	"Mum Fighting the Clock"	25 April 2022

=== Series 4 ===
No.	Title	Original release date
1	"Lily Phillips: X-Rated Creator"	24 August 2025
2	"The Surrogacy King"	2 September 2025
3	"Britain's Benefit Queen"	9 September 2025

=== Stacey Dooley Sleeps Over USA ===
==== Series 1 ====
No.	Title	Original release date
1	"9-Year-Old GunTuber"	22 February 2023
2	"Transgender Mum and Dad"	1 March 2023
3	"37-Year Age Gap Lovers"	8 March 2023

==== Series 2 ====
No.	Title	Original release date
1	"The Brothel"	17 March 2024
2	"Two Mums, One Dad"	24 March 2024
3	"The Mormon With Two Wives"	31 March 2024
