= Blood, Sweat and T-shirts =

2008 British television documentary series

- Country of origin: United Kingdom
- No. of episodes: 4

Production
- Running time: 60 minutes

Original release
- Network: BBC Three
- Release: 22 April – 13 May 2008

Related
- Blood, Sweat and Takeaways

Blood, Sweat and T-shirts is a British TV documentary series, broadcast in 2008 on BBC Three.

The series followed six British fashion consumers aged between 20 and 24 as they travelled to India to live and work alongside Indian garment workers, making clothes destined for sale in British high-street stores.

The series was nominated in the Best Factual Series category at the 2009 BAFTA Television Awards. One of the participants in Blood, Sweat and T-shirts was Stacey Dooley, who went on to present a range of programmes for the BBC, starting off with the BBC Three documentary Stacey Dooley Investigates in 2009.

The series was followed by Blood, Sweat and Takeaways in 2009, which focused on the food production in Asia, and Blood, Sweat and Luxuries in 2010, which focused on the production of luxury goods in Africa.

== International broadcast ==
- In Australia, Blood, Sweat and T-shirts aired on ABC2 each Wednesday at 8:30pm from 7 April 2010.
- In the Asia Pacific region (including India) on Australia Network from 25 August 2009 at various timeslots.
- In Finland on YLE TV2 each Wednesday at 8pm from 13 January 2010, edited down to 45-minute episodes.
- In Germany on ZDFneo every night at 7:15pm from 28 September – 1 October 2010.

== See also ==
- Alter-globalisation
- Ethical consumerism
- Fair trade
- Occupational safety and health
- Sweatshop
