= The Pets Factor =

British children's television series

- Genre: Documentary
- Starring: Rory Cowlam; Cheryl Lucas; Cat Henstridge; James Greenwood
- Theme music composer: The Firm
- Country of origin: United Kingdom
- Original language: English
- No. of series: 8
- No. of episodes: 90

Production
- Executive producers: Hugh Lawton; Jess Fowle
- Producer: Sima Ray
- Running time: 20 minutes
- Production company: True North Productions

Original release
- Network: CBBC
- Release: 20 June 2017 – 8 August 2021

The Pets Factor is a British children's television documentary series, which aired on CBBC from 20 June 2017 to 8 August 2021. The series, produced by True North Productions, follows the work of four vets in the UK: Rory Cowlam, Cheryl Lucas, Cat Henstridge and James Greenwood. Stacey Dooley presented the first four series, after which the vets took on the role between themselves. New vet Fabian Rivers joined in series 7.

== Episodes ==
=== Series 1 (2017) ===
No. overall	No. in season	Title	Original release date
1	1	"Tilly, Martel and Duke"	20 June 2017
James scans Tilly the pregnant cavapoo who is about to become a mum for the very first time, Cheryl performs tricky surgery on Duke the Hungarian vizsla, who has a nasty looking lump on his neck and Rory finds a lot more than he'd bargained for with Martel - a big Bengal cat with the appetite of a Bengal tiger.
2	2	"Bagheera, Tommy and Casper"	27 June 2017
Cat works around the clock to save some seriously poorly border collie pups, Cheryl experiences every vet's worst nightmare with dental surgery on her own beloved cat, Bagheera, and for Rory, a simple procedure will help to tame two boisterous kittens. Also, Cheryl gets her hands on a rather unusual patient at the Essex practice.
3	3	"Jabba, Lolly and Hercules"	4 July 2017
Cheryl performs a vital facelift on Jabba the poorly pug, and Rory is feeling the pressure as he has to put Lolly the sick guinea pig under potentially life-threatening anaesthetic. We also catch up with vet James at his animal-packed home and see him giving a wannabe vet a lesson in calf tagging.
4	4	"Tilly, Pretzel, Bambi and Jasper"	11 July 2017
James gets a visit from Pretzel, a royal python with a mystery blockage. We join vet Cat at her family farm and Jasper, an itchy cavapoo, gives her an earful. Also things get a bit messy with Cheryl's client, Bambi - a cute ten-week-old pomeranian pup, who's not exactly toilet trained.
