= DNA Family Secrets =

BBC television series

- Genre: Documentary
- Directed by: Aodh Breathnach (series 1); Brent Gundesen (series 2)
- Presented by: Stacey Dooley; Turi King
- Composer: Edward Farmer
- Country of origin: United Kingdom
- Original language: English
- No. of series: 3
- No. of episodes: 15

Production
- Executive producer: Kari Lia
- Running time: 60 minutes
- Production company: Minnow Films

Original release
- Network: BBC
- Release: 2 March 2021 – present

DNA Family Secrets is a British television series which began airing on BBC Two in March 2021. The programme is presented by Stacey Dooley and geneticist, Professor Turi King, and uses the latest DNA technology to solve family mysteries around ancestry, missing relatives and genetic disease. The second series began airing on 11 May 2022.

== Synopsis ==
Presented by Dooley and King, the series sees Dooley meeting people "across the UK who want to unlock the mysteries hidden in their genetic code". Each episode follows three people – two of these trying to find out about their family history or ancestry, and another who is seeking to find answers about a genetic disease in the family. Dooley and King work with a large team of genealogists, social workers, and doctors to reveal unknown ancestry, find missing relatives and detect genetic disease before it's too late.

== Episodes ==
=== Series overview ===
Series	Episodes	Originally released
1	3	2 March 2021
2	6	11 May 2022
3	6	27 September 2023

=== Series 1 (2021) ===
No. overall	No. in series	Episode	Directed by	Original release date	UK viewers (millions)
1	1	Episode 1	Aodh Breathnach	2 March 2021	2.395
Bill, 75, grew up without knowing his biological father. Born through a love affair between his mother and an African-American GI stationed near Loughborough, Bill’s father went back to the States after the war and she never heard from him again. The only information Bill had about his father is the name written on his birth certificate. Now that his mother has died, Bill wants to find out if DNA analysis can tell him more about his ancestry and if he has any living relatives in the US. Richard, 53, was very close to his father. It came as a complete shock when someone contacted him after his father’s death, claiming to be his real dad. A DNA test shows Richard and his sister have different fathers, so Richard wonders if this person may be his biological father. Richard hopes DNA testing will be able to solve this mystery and show if he has a half-brother, Brendon. Charlie has recently found out that her father has Huntington’s disease – a terminal illness without a cure. With a 50/50 chance that she has inherited the mutated form of the gene, Charlie is desperate to know whether she also has it, and, if so, does that mean that her and her partner’s son, Cian, will also develop to have Huntington’s disease.
2	2	Episode 2	Aodh Breathnach	9 March 2021	1.2
Leicester-born Janine, has lived her entire life never knowing the identity or ethnicity of her birth father. Her white-British mum died taking the secret of who Janine’s biological father was to her grave. Growing up with darker skin. Janine wants to know if DNA can help her to find out anything about her father’s heritage. Adopted in Southport when she was only six months old, Margaret has never felt brave enough to find out anything about her ancestry. In particular, she would really like to find out about her birth mother and what happened to her all those years ago. Could she have other family out there who she's never met. Duri was in her early 20s when she lost her mother to ovarian cancer. With there being genes that predispose people to ovarian cancer, could it be that she carries a potentially dangerous genetic mutation in her own DNA. Duri wants to have her DNA analysed to find out.
3	3	Episode 3	Aodh Breathnach	16 March 2021	1.6
Northern Irish triplets, Peter, David and Phillip were adopted as young boys and while they knew about their biological mother who passed away some years ago, they've never known where their father comes from. They have ideas, but when Professor Turi King reveals what is hidden in their DNA, it changes everything they thought they knew about their ancestry. Tink didn't find out she was a sperm donor child until she was 17 years old and pregnant with her first child. Tink would like to know what DNA can tell her about her biological father and if she has any half donor siblings. With 45,000 donor conceived people on the registers in the UK she will only be able to find a half brother or sister if they're looking for her as well. Three year-old Leo is slowly going blind and his parents are desperate to know if his sight loss is due to a genetic mutation. If so, he could be eligible for gene therapy to help save his sight. Can genetic analysis provide Mitchell and Manuela with the answers they need to get help for their son?

=== Series 2 (2022) ===
No. overall	No. in series	Episode	Directed by	Original release date	UK viewers (millions)
4	1	Episode 1	Brent Gundesen	11 May 2022	N/A
Stacey is in Liverpool to meet 52 year-old Richard, who is on a life-long mission to discover the identity of his father. With his mum never revealing the truth while she was still alive, Richard has hit a number of dead ends researching on his own. When Professor Turi King and the team test his DNA, they deliver far more than Richard expects - and he’s blown away when finally learning the truth. Sixty two year-old Janet has spent her life wondering if a rumour is true that she might have a secret sister. When her father returned as a British prisoner of war during World War Two, she had heard that he may have fathered a child while in Austria. She now wants to know if there is a half-sister on the continent looking for her as well... Glen’s mother never knew where his father was from, only that he wasn’t white. After spending his school years in Oxfordshire feeling like the odd one out, he’s desperate to finally learn his ancestry. Testing his DNA is the only way to finally give him answers.
5	2	Episode 2	Brent Gundesen	18 May 2022	N/A
Liverpool-born Maureen is wondering if her father was an African-American GI who fell in love with her mother during the Second World War - which could mean she has family in the US. She’s also curious why her three sons are so musically talented and if the secret may lie in her DNA. 79-year-old Jackie grew up in a Nazi concentration camp as a Jewish orphan and wants to know why he survived. Was his dad actually a Nazi? And did any of his birth family escape the Holocaust?
6	3	Episode 3	Jason Ferguson	25 May 2022	N/A
Forty six year-old Mel only found out as a teenager that she was conceived using a sperm donor. Now she wants to see if she can find her biological father’s identity by decoding her DNA… and discovers far more than she ever expected. When mother-of-six Fi looked into her adoption as an adult she made a horrific discovery: that her birth mum was murdered by her birth father, a few years after she was adopted. Fi now wonders if this man was really her biological father or if it might be someone else, which was rumoured at the time. She’s also concerned that, if this man is indeed her father, that she might have passed down a 'murder gene' to one of her six children. Bahaa escaped the war in Syria with his wife and two children to live in the UK. But soon after his arrival, Bahaa’s brother, Alaa, had to undergo life-saving surgery after discovering he had cancer. Alaa survived, but discovered the cancer was caused by a genetic condition called Lynch Syndrome. There’s now a 50 percent chance that Bahaa carries the same gene - testing his DNA is the only way to find out.
7	4	Episode 4	Unknown	1 June 2022	N/A
Thirty eight year-old Clare was always told by her mum that Clare’s father was a British soldier stationed in Belfast during the Troubles. But she began to doubt her mum’s story when family friends believed it was another man… making Clare mixed race. Now Clare wants to solve the mystery of her father’s identity. Leigh only discovered that he might have a secret sister after his mum passed away. He now wants to know if this is true and if so, whether she’s still alive. It was only when Jenna was pregnant with her and Ryan's first child that they realised they both carried a potentially genetic mutation that could be deadly if passed down to their children. They’re now hoping that DNA testing might help them be able to finally grow their family.
8	5	Episode 5	Unknown	8 June 2022	N/A
Georgina was conceived during a holiday romance 34 years ago when her mum fell for a Portuguese waiter. She now wants to know if her father is still alive and, if so, let him know he has a daughter. Matthew grew up in foster care never knowing where his father came from. He now wants to discover his ancestry and if he is actually Caribbean. Michaela and Richie only realised they could pass down a potentially deadly genetic mutation when their first son was diagnosed with Bubble boy disease. Now they’re testing their newborn son’s DNA to discover if he has to undergo life-saving gene therapy.
9	6	Episode 6	Unknown	15 June 2022	N/A
Stacey meets five sisters in Lancashire who only found each other as adults. They know they all share the same mum, but want to find out if they also have the same father. Luke was a sperm donor as a university student in the late 1980s. He’s now come forward to find out if any potential children might be looking for him. Identical twins Diane and Louise want to test their DNA to discover if they both carry the potentially deadly BRCA genetic mutation since they lost their mother to cancer.

== Reception ==
The series has received positive reviews both on social media and in print. Stuart Jeffries of The Guardian praised the series, calling it “a touching, timely portrait of mixed-race Britain”, saying the “show doesn't need celebrities to gild its drama".

Rachael Sigee of Inews wrote "you'd have to be cynical not to be moved by this reunion series", and that "Stacey Dooley’s new genealogy series was no less heartwarming for having to take place over Zoom".

Sara Wallis of The Mirror gave it a positive review, writing that “it makes for gripping TV”, “emotional, with fascinating DNA facts”, with results delivered by King with “wonderful empathy”.

Lucy Lethbridge of The Tablet praised the show, saying "If I were going to rattle the skeletons in my family's closet on primetime television, there are few people I would rather do it with than Stacey Dooley".

Paul Whitelaw of The Courier called it a "poignant genealogy series" before going on to say "Dooley is a good choice of host, she's likeable and empathetic, but the star of the show is Professor Turi King, who explains the science and gently guides the contributors through the entire process. She radiates kindness".

Jane Rackham of the Radio Times said the series has "an interesting twist that taps into our fascination with our past".
