= Glow Up: Britain's Next Make-Up Star series 4 =

2024 series of Glow Up

Glow Up: Britain's Next Make-Up Star
- Series 4
- Presented by: Maya Jama
- Judges: Dominic Skinner; Val Garland
- No. of contestants: 10
- Winner: Yong-Chin Breslin
- Runners-up: Lisa Street, Kris Cannon
- No. of episodes: 8

Release
- Original network: BBC Three
- Original release: 11 May – 29 June 2022

Series chronology
- ← Previous; Series 3 Next → Series 5

The fourth series of Glow Up: Britain's Next Make-Up Star began on 11 May 2022 on BBC Three, and concluded on 29 June 2022. The series was hosted by Maya Jama and was judged by industry professionals Dominic Skinner and Val Garland, the latter two having been the judges since the inception of the show in 2019.

== Contestants ==
Contestant	Age (Note: Ages stated are at time of contest)	Hometown	Profession	Outcome
Yong-Chin Breslin	25	Glasgow	Part Time Nanny	Winner
Lisa Street	26	Unknown	Primary School Teacher	Runner-Up
Kris Cannon	28	Ireland	MAC Beauty Counter and Resident MUA at Cirque le Soir nightclub	Runner-Up
Nance'	29	Unknown	Freelance MUA	4th Place
Rachel	24	Unknown	Pharmaceutical Rep	5th Place
Ryan	20	Bolton	Student	6th Place
Sophie Gouk	26	London	Retail MUA	7th Place
Mikael	23	Unknown	Loss Prevention Center	8th Place
Adam	21	Liverpool	Freelance MUA	9th Place
Charlie	21	Telford, Shropshire	Artist	10th Place

== Guest Judges ==
- Ivy Weir-Ikpeme - Brand Styling Manager for Gymshark.
- Dr Anjali Mahto - Consultant Dermatologist and Author of ‘The Skincare Bible’.
- Maryse Gosselin - Make-up Designer for Cirque Du Soleil.
- Danny Marie Elias - One of the UK’s leading TV and Film make-up and prosthetic artists.
- Marjorie Lacombe-Jelinek - Global Creative Director for H&M Beauty.
- Hector Espinal - Global Make-up Artist for Fenty Beauty.
- Dan Moller - Creative Strategist and AR Specialist at Meta.
- Paige Piskin - US based AR make-up and character artist.
- Pablo Rodriguez - Legendary make-up artist.
- Mark Fast - World-renowned British Fashion designer.
- Manny MUA - Make-up artist, YouTuber, entrepreneur and beauty blogger.
- Rankin - Globally-renowned photographer and director.

== Contestant progress ==
Contestant	1	2	3	4	5	6	7	8	
Yong-Chin	SAFE	SAFE	BTM2	BTM2	SAFE	WIN	WIN	SAFE	Winner
Lisa	WIN	SAFE	SAFE	SAFE	SAFE	WIN	SAFE	SAFE	Runner-up
Kris	SAFE	SAFE	SAFE	SAFE	SAFE	SAFE	BTM2	SAFE	Third Place
Nancé	SAFE	SAFE	SAFE	SAFE	SAFE	BTM2	ELIM		
Rachel	SAFE	BTM2	SAFE	WIN	WIN	ELIM			
Ryan	SAFE	SAFE	WIN	SAFE	ELIM				
Sophie	SAFE	SAFE	SAFE	ELIM					
Mikael	BTM2	WIN	ELIM						
Adam	SAFE	ELIM							
Charlie	ELIM								

The contestant won Glow Up.
The contestant was a runner-up.
The contestant came in third place.
The contestant won the challenge.
The contestant was originally in the red chair but later declared safe.
The contestant was originally safe but later up for elimination.
The contestant was in the red chair and still eligible for elimination.
The contestant was originally safe but later up for elimination and was then further eliminated.
The contestant won the challenge but was up for elimination, but not eliminated.
The contestant won the challenge but was eliminated.
The contestant decided to leave the competition before the face-off.
The contestant was in the red chair and then further eliminated.

== Episodes ==
No. overall	No. in series	Title	Original release date
25	1	"Social Media Campaign"	11 May 2022
Guest judge: Ivy Weeeir-Ikpeme; Professional Assignment: Design makup for social media campaign for Gymshark.; Professional Assignment Winner: Lisa; Red Chair: Ryan, Nance'; Creative Brief: Create a look that tells their hidden strength.; Face Off Elimination: Charlie, Mikael; Face Off Challenge: Reverse cat eye.; Eliminated: Charlie
26	2	"Theatre Make-Up: Cirque Du Soleil"	18 May 2022
Guest judge: Maryse Gosselin; Professional Assignment: Apply makeup for Cirque du Soleil performers; Professional Assignment winner: Mikael; Red Chair: Ryan, Kris; Creative Brief: Create high impact and dramatic body makeup look.; Bottom two: Adam, Rachel; Face Off Challenge: Mermaid lip.; Eliminated: Adam
27	3	"TV Special Effects: Doctor Who"	25 May 2022
Guest judge: Danny Marie Elias; Professional Assignment: Create a new alien character for Doctor Who.; Professional Assignment winne: Ryan; Creative Brief: Create monstrous mutation character from a science experiment that's gone wrong.; Bottom two: Mikael, Yong-Chin; Face Off Challenge: Recreate floating pearl eyeline.; Eliminated: Mikael
28	4	"H&M Beauty Campaign"	1 June 2022
Guest judge: Marjorie Lacombe-Jelinek; Professional Assignment: Create a look for a summer night party social media campaign for H&M; Professional Assignment winners: Rachel; Creative Brief: Create a bold and creative look that tells story of pivotal moment in MUA's life.; Bottom two: Sophie, Yong-Chin; Face Off Challenge: Create powder matte red lip; Eliminated: Sophie
29	5	"Magazine Editorial Shoot"	8 June 2022
Guest judge: Hector Espinal; Professional Assignment: Create a makeup look for Rolling Stone UK 90s raver Jayda G music video.; Professional Assignment winner: Rachel; Creative Brief: Produce a statue that shows how MUA wants to be remembered.; Bottom two: Ryan, Rachel; Face Off Challenge: Rectangular crystal blocked brow.; Eliminated: Ryan
30	6	"Digital Make-Up: Instagram Filters"	15 June 2022
Guest judge: Dan Moller, Paige Piskin; Professional Assignment: Design a look that will be turned into makeup filters for Instagram.; Professional Assignment winner: Yong-Chin and Lisa; Creative Brief: Create a makeup look to transform model into avatar.; Bottom two: Nance', Rachel; Face Off Challenge: Midnight blue vinyl lip.; Eliminated: Rachel
31	7	"London Fashion Week"	22 June 2022
Guest judge: Pablo Rodriguez; Professional Assignment: Create two looks for London fashion week.; Professional Assignment winner: Yong-Chin; Creative Brief: Produce a look that tells about a moment of rebellion in MUA's life.; Bottom two: Kris, Nance'; Face Off Challenge: Graphic black oval eye.; Eliminated: Nance'
32	8	"The Finale: Masterclasses"	29 June 2022
Guest judges: Manny MUA, Rankin; Professional Assignment: Host a make-up masterclass with an audience of industry professionals, influencers and reporters.; Creative Brief: Create a look that is inspired by MUA's own makeup metamorphisis.; Face Off Challenge: Smokey eye using 3 colors, flawless skin, brushed brow and tinted lip.; Third Place: Kris; Runner-up: Lisa; Winner: Yong-Chin
