= Streetvet =

StreetVet
- Founded: 2016
- Founder: Jade Statt, Sam Joseph
- Purpose: Charity providing veterinary treatment and owner support
- Location: United Kingdom
- Region served: United Kingdom
- Volunteers: 300 (2019)
- Website: https://www.streetvet.org.uk/

StreetVet is a registered charity that offers free accessible vet care to pets belonging to those experiencing homelessness in the United Kingdom. The organisation provides support for homeless pet owners who cannot afford private veterinary treatment and educates them on the responsibilities and care of animal ownership.

== Operations ==
The charitable objectives are described as "1. THE RELIEF OF POVERTY OF THE PEOPLE WHO ARE HOMELESS, FACING HOMELESSNESS OR ROUGH SLEEPERS WHO ARE IN NEED, HARDSHIP AND DISTRESS ON ACCOUNT OF THEIR SOCIAL AND ECONOMIC CIRCUMSTANCES, IN PARTICULAR BUT NOT EXCLUSIVELY BY THE PROVISION OF VETERINARY CARE FOR THEIR COMPANION ANIMAL. 2. TO PROMOTE HUMANE BEHAVIOUR TOWARDS ANIMALS BY PROVIDING APPROPRIATE CARE, PROTECTION, TREATMENT AND SECURITY FOR ANIMALS WHICH ARE IN NEED OF CARE AND ATTENTION.

StreetVet operates throughout London, Bristol, Brighton, Birmingham, Plymouth, Cambridge, Southampton and Cheltenham. Its major services are: providing veterinary services to pet owners who cannot afford the private fees charged by private veterinary surgeons and promoting animal welfare through education.

StreetVet vets and nurses, working with Streets Kitchen and other organisations, are out in the London community at least four days a week.

== Partnerships ==
The Blue Cross and the Village Vet Group are some of the earliest supporters of StreetVet.

The organisation can’t work without the support of local practices and hospitals. While many things can be done on the streets, simple operations such as neutering, dental procedures and lump removals need the use of theatres.

The founders of StreetVet have teamed up with hairdresser and #dosomethingfornothing campaign founder Josh Coombes, who was giving homeless people across the capital free haircuts for 18 months prior to 2017.

StreetVet launched a partnership with IAPWA on World Homeless Day (10 October 2017).

== Accreditation and awards ==
StreetVet are accredited with:

- The Royal College of Veterinary Surgeons.

Awards:

- The Royal College of Veterinary Surgeons Impact Award, 2018
- Prime Minister’s Points of Light award
