= Glow Up: Britain's Next Make-Up Star =

British reality competition series

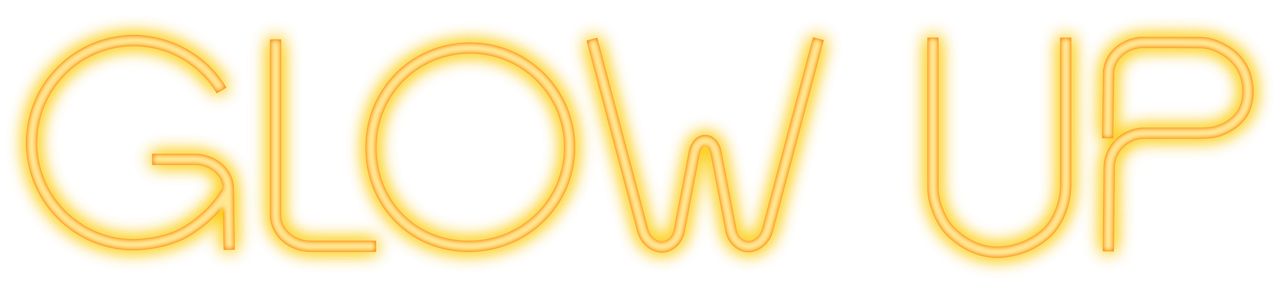
- Genre: Reality competition
- Created by: Michael Fraser
- Directed by: Rob Fisher
- Presented by: Stacey Dooley; Maya Jama; Leomie Anderson
- Judges: Dominic Skinner; Val Garland
- Composer: Tom Haines
- Country of origin: United Kingdom
- Original language: English
- No. of series: 7
- No. of episodes: 54 (list of episodes)

Production
- Executive producer: Melissa Brown
- Producers: Katherine Davitt; Murray Wilkinson; Becky Timothy
- Production location: United Kingdom
- Editors: Andy Wood; Dylan Chase
- Running time: 60 minutes
- Production company: Wall to Wall Media

Original release
- Network: BBC Three
- Release: 6 March 2019 – present

Glow Up: Britain's Next Make-Up Star (often shortened to Glow Up) is a British reality television competition on BBC Three devised to find new makeup artists. Originally hosted by Stacey Dooley, the first series premiered on 6 March 2019. The contestants take part in weekly challenges to progress through the competition, which are judged by industry professionals Dominic Skinner and Val Garland, as well as weekly guest stars.

After the conclusion of the first series, Glow Up was renewed for a second series, which premiered in May 2020. The third series began airing in April 2021, with Maya Jama replacing Dooley as the presenter, with the fourth series beginning airing on 11 May 2022. The reality series was renewed for a fifth series beginning on 2 May 2023, with Leomie Anderson replacing Jama as the presenter. The sixth series began on 10 April 2024.

== History ==
In January 2019, it was announced that English television personality Stacey Dooley would present Glow Up: Britain's Next Make-Up Star. On the series, Dooley commented: "I'm delighted to be involved with Glow Up. The make-up artists are so impressive and talented… and Val and Dominic were a scream to work with." Industry professionals Dominic Skinner and Val Garland were also announced as judges for the series. Dooley was criticised for her decision to partake in the programme, with her being accused of "selling out" and "ditching her investigative journalism roots". Dooley responded to the claims, saying: "It's painfully predictable: there are always people who are desperate to put you in your one camp and never let you leave. The idea that you could be interested in the Yazidi community and also in lipstick blows people's minds. It's a really short-sighted Stone Age attitude; it's boring, actually. I've earned my stripes; I don't need to prove myself to anyone. She added that: "We should celebrate make-up. It's a lucrative industry; a massive employer." Netflix acquired the rights to distribute Glow Up as a Netflix Original series in 2019.

In July 2019, Glow Up was renewed for a second series. Dooley stated that she had fun filming the first series and expressed her excitement to be involved in the second series. Garland and Skinner echoed the comments, with Skinner adding that the MUAs need to raise the bar from what they had seen in the first series. The second series premiered on BBC Three on 14 May 2020.

In October 2020, Dooley announced that she would not be presenting the third series of Glow Up due to scheduling conflicts with her new series This Is My House. On 14 January 2021, it was announced that Glow Up had been renewed for a third series, set to air later that year. On the same day, it was announced that Dooley had been replaced by Maya Jama. On her decision to present Glow Up, Jama commented: "I absolutely love Glow Up and can't wait to join the family! I’m obsessed with makeup and creating different looks- it’s going to be so much fun and I can't wait to see what the MUAs get up to." Executive producer Melissa Brown stated that the series "will build on the massive success of series two with an incredible cast and exciting challenges, with access to the world's biggest film sets and brands." The third series began broadcasting on 20 April 2021.

The fourth series began airing on 11 May 2022 on BBC Three. The series consisted of 8 episodes, debuting for the first time as a weekly slot on the relaunched BBC Three television channel. Previously, all series were directly streaming on BBC iPlayer.

== Cast ==
| Cast member | Seasons | | | | | | |
| Cast member | 1 2019 | 2 2020 | 3 2021 | 4 2022 | 5 2023 | 6 2024 | 7 2025 |
Host
| Stacey Dooley | ● | ● | | | | | |
| Maya Jama | | | ● | ● | | | |
| Leomie Anderson | | | | | ● | ● | ● |
Judges
| Val Garland | ● | ● | ● | ● | ● | ● | ● |
| Dominic Skinner | ● | ● | ● | ● | ● | ● | ● |

== Winners ==
| Series | Contestants | Winner | Age | Hometown | Other Finalist(s) |
|---|---|---|---|---|---|
| 1 | 10 | Ellis Atlantis | 24 | Bradford | Nikki Patel, Leigh Easthope |
| 2 | 10 | Ophelia Liu | 25 | London | James Mac Inerney, Eve Jenkins |
| 3 | 10 | Sophie Baverstock | 21 | London (Note: At the time of filming Glow Up season 3, Sophie was studying at an Arts University in Bournemouth) | Craig Hamilton, Dolli Okoriko |
| 4 | 10 | Yong-Chin Breslin | 25 | London | Lisa Street, Kris Cannon |
| 5 | 10 | Saphron Morgan | 23 | Essex | Roo, Kieran Musley, Axel Brown |
| 6 | 8 | Shania Parris | 24 | Coventry | Ella Freer, Connor McGee |

== Episodes ==
| Series | Episodes | Originally released | |
| Series | Episodes | First released | Last released |
|---|---|---|---|
| 1 | 8 | 6 March 2019 | 24 April 2019 |
| 2 | 8 | 14 May 2020 | 2 July 2020 |
| 3 | 8 | 20 April 2021 | 8 June 2021 |
| 4 | 8 | 11 May 2022 | 29 June 2022 |
| 5 | 8 | 2 May 2023 | 21 June 2023 |
| 6 | 6 | 10 April 2024 | 15 May 2024 |
| 7 | 8 | 30 April 2025 | 18 June 2025 |

=== Series 1 (2019) ===
| No. overall | No. in series | Title | Original release date |
|---|---|---|---|
| 1 | 1 | "Episode 1" | 6 March 2019 |
| 2 | 2 | "Episode 2" | 13 March 2019 |
| 3 | 3 | "Episode 3" | 20 March 2019 |
| 4 | 4 | "Episode 4" | 27 March 2019 |
| 5 | 5 | "Episode 5" | 3 April 2019 |
| 6 | 6 | "Episode 6" | 10 April 2019 |
| 7 | 7 | "Semi Final" | 17 April 2019 |
| 8 | 8 | "Final" | 24 April 2019 |

=== Series 2 (2020) ===
| No. overall | No. in series | Title | Original release date |
|---|---|---|---|
| 9 | 1 | "Episode 1" | 14 May 2020 |
| 10 | 2 | "Episode 2" | 21 May 2020 |
| 11 | 3 | "Episode 3" | 28 May 2020 |
| 12 | 4 | "Episode 4" | 4 June 2020 |
| 13 | 5 | "Episode 5" | 11 June 2020 |
| 14 | 6 | "Episode 6" | 18 June 2020 |
| 15 | 7 | "Episode 7" | 25 June 2020 |
| 16 | 8 | "Episode 8" | 2 July 2020 |

=== Series 3 (2021) ===
| No. overall | No. in series | Title | Original release date |
|---|---|---|---|
| 17 | 1 | "Episode 1" | 20 April 2021 |
| 18 | 2 | "Episode 2" | 27 April 2021 |
| 19 | 3 | "Episode 3" | 4 May 2021 |
| 20 | 4 | "Episode 4" | 11 May 2021 |
| 21 | 5 | "Episode 5" | 18 May 2021 |
| 22 | 6 | "Episode 6" | 25 May 2021 |
| 23 | 7 | "Episode 7" | 1 June 2021 |
| 24 | 8 | "Episode 8" | 8 June 2021 |

== Format ==
In the professional assignment, the make-up artists (MUAs) are set a task by the judges, outside of the studio, to follow a brief for something. At the end the challenge, the judges choose one to three challenge winners who stay behind to help with more make up looks. At the end of the professional assignment, the judges will choose a provisional bottom two going into the creative brief. The two people in the "red chairs" are given a 15-minute penalty going into the creative brief. In the creative brief, the MUAs are given a description of the look required. The MUAs are typically given preparation time prior to the challenge. If an MUA in a red chair is successful in the challenge, they have 'Beat The Seat'. Therefore, an MUA who performed less successfully take their place in the Face Off. In the face off, two MUAs take part in a challenge; the challenge content normally focuses on one section of the face, such as recreating an eye look or applying the "perfect lip". The MUA who performs the worst is eliminated, and the other progresses onto the next episode.

== Reception ==
After its premiere, Jazmin Kapotsha of Refinery29 described the programme as a mixture of America's Next Top Model, The Great British Bake Off and YouTube beauty tutorials. She added that the "craft is undeniably incredible" and that "it came as a huge surprise". Sara Wallis of the Daily Mirror wrote: "I'm fascinated by the astonishing makeup creations and lashings of high drama. It’s an angsty, youthful show that certainly glows."

== International versions ==
=== Ireland ===
An Irish version of the reality series, Glow Up Ireland premiered on 2 September 2021 on RTÉ and 23 March 2022 on BBC Three. Glen Edward McGuinness was crowned winner of the debut series of Glow Up Ireland.

=== Netherlands ===
The Dutch version, Glow Up: The Next Dutch Make-Up Star, premiered on 15 March 2021 in Netherlands on the streaming service Videoland with Nikkie de Jager and make-up artist Pernell Kusmus as judges. Marly won its first season.

=== Germany ===
Glow Up: Germany's Next Make-Up Star premiered on 22 September 2022 in Germany, Ahmed Mnissi won its first season on 10 November 2022. The German version of Glow Up was renewed for a second season, airing September 7, 2023.

=== China ===
In late 2023, Glow Up China was announced to launch in China on Tencent Video.

=== Brazil ===
Glow Up Brasil: A Próxima Estrela de Maquiagem is launched in Brazil by TV Globo and Disney+. It was also produced by Endemol Shine Brazil, Grupo Globo and The Walt Disney Company. It was hosted by Xuxa with three judges: cosplayer Amanda Calabria, drag queen Fontana and singer Juliette Freire, but with British format. It also was directed by Rodrigo Dourado and premieres May 15, 2027.

=== United States ===
Glow Up: America's Next Makeup Star launches in the United States of America. It also premieres November 12, 2027 in Fox Broadcasting Company and was hosted by Jessica Nigri. Dominic Skinner and Val Garland also judge the show, like in the British version.

=== Spain ===
Glow Up España: La Próxima Estrella de Maquillaje premieres in March 14, 2028 on Antena 3 and Mediaset España, at Spain.
