= Buried by the Bernards =

American reality comedy series

- Genre: Reality television
- Starring: Debbie Bernard; Ryan Bernard; Deja Bernard; Raegan Bernard; Kevin Miller
- Country of origin: United States
- Original language: English
- No. of seasons: 1
- No. of episodes: 8

Production
- Executive producer: Ian Gelfand
- Producers: Warren D. Robinson; Marcia Fields; Joanna White Oldham; Tim Phares; Michael Spear; Jason Gregory; Tamara Martin
- Production locations: Memphis, Tennessee
- Cinematography: Pedro Feria Pino
- Running time: 24 minutes
- Production company: 13Brains

Original release
- Network: Netflix
- Release: February 12, 2021

Buried by the Bernards is an American reality comedy series created by Netflix. The series centers on the Bernard family, who operate R. Bernard Funeral Services in Memphis, Tennessee. The eight-episode series was released on February 12, 2021.

== Synopsis ==
The series follows the day-to-day operations of a funeral home in Memphis, run by the Bernard family matriarch, Debbie; her son, Ryan; Ryan's uncle, Kevin; and Ryan's daughters, Raegan and Deja.

== Episodes ==
No.	Title	Original release date	Prod. code
1	"Meet the Bernards"	February 12, 2021	101
As Ryan and his mother, Debbie, argue over who's the boss, Raegan gets a crash course in hearse duty, and Deja takes a stand.
2	"Driving a Hard Bargain"	February 12, 2021	102
Kevin gives Ryan a lesson in the fine art of negotiation when the two head off to buy a new hearse. Meanwhile, Debbie puts her granddaughters to work.
3	"Life After Death"	February 12, 2021	103
While Deja and Corey are at a prenatal appointment, Raegan, Ryan, Debbie, Kevin and Tavion pull out all the stops and plan a surprise baby shower.
4	"New Kid on the Block"	February 12, 2021	104
Tavion steps up while Deja takes some time to bond with her newborn. Ryan and Debbie debate whether to expand the business.
5	"Daddy Daughter Day"	February 12, 2021	105
Deja agrees — reluctantly — to go fishing with her dad. Debbie and her pal gossip like pros. Raegan encourages Kevin to learn new makeup techniques.
6	"Lights, Camera, Distraction!"	February 12, 2021	106
The Bernards make an outrageous commercial as Debbie directs. Also, Ryan musters the courage to talk about the birds and the bees with Raegan.
7	"Can't Hardly Date"	February 12, 2021	107
Deja and Raegan pressure Debbie to give online dating a try. Meanwhile, Kevin adds some excitement to Ryan's presentation about the mortuary business.
8	"Who's the Boss?"	February 12, 2021	108
Tired of her father and grandma's constant arguing, Deja brings in a mediator. Meanwhile, it's time for Raegan to finally pick a college.

== Production ==
R. Bernard Funeral Services opened in 2017 in Memphis, Tennessee. The Bernard family received national publicity for the funeral home due to viral marketing campaigns. After the business received publicity, Ryan Bernard was contacted by producer Warren D. Robinson about developing a comedic reality series.

The series was filmed in early 2020 just prior to social distancing restrictions brought on by the COVID-19 pandemic. While the show is not scripted, certain episodes shot in a single day were sometimes depicted as if they happened over several days.

Buried by the Bernards debuted on Netflix on February 12, 2021.

== Reception ==
The series received mainly positive reception. In a positive review, Kathryn VanArendonk wrote for Vulture, "The appeal is really in the family dynamic. The Bernards are palpably exasperated with one another, and they also come across as people who sincerely care about each other." Noting the greater context of a show about funeral homes airing amid a deadly pandemic, Allison Herman of The Ringer asserted, "Even a show that actively tries to be escapist can't transcend subject matter this heavy—far heavier than the Bernards could have anticipated when they were mugging for the cameras. In the end, Buried with the Bernards is unfortunately trapped between the light and the macabre."
