= Leomie Anderson =

British model and designer (born 1993)

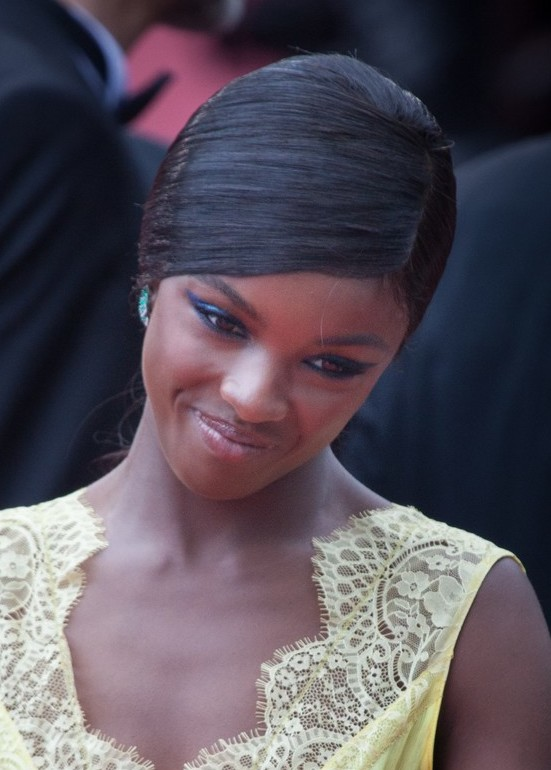
- Anderson in 2018
- Born: Leomie Jasmin Francis Anderson; 15 February 1993 (age 33); London, England
- Occupations: Fashion model; television presenter; activist
- Years active: 2010–present
- Partner: Lancey Foux (2016–2023)
- Modeling information
- Height: 5 ft 10 1/2 in (1.79 m)
- Hair color: Black
- Eye color: Brown
- Agency: CAA (New York, Los Angeles); Premium Models (Paris); D'Management Group (Milan); TESS Management (London)
- Website: lappthebrand.com

Leomie Jasmin Francis Anderson (born 14 February 1993) is a British fashion model, television presenter, and activist. She walked in four consecutive Victoria's Secret Fashion Shows from 2015 to 2018, and became a Victoria's Secret Angel in 2019. Anderson was included in a 2020 Forbes '30 Under 30' list for the art & culture category. In 2023, she joined the British reality television competition series Glow Up: Britain's Next Make-Up Star as a co-host.

== Career ==
Anderson, originally from Wandsworth, London, and of Jamaican heritage, began a career as a model when she was scouted at the age of 14. Initially, she wanted to become a fashion journalist. At age 17, she was booked for her first catwalk show by Marc Jacobs, becoming one of the designer's favorites.

In 2011, Anderson appeared on the Channel 4's reality show The Model Agency.

She has walked for brands such as Giorgio Armani, Burberry, Chloé, Fenty Puma, Tom Ford, Tommy Hilfiger, Calvin Klein, Ralph Lauren, Moschino, Oscar de la Renta, Jeremy Scott, Temperley, Vivienne Westwood, and Yeezy. She became one of the faces for her role model, Rihanna’s, brand Fenty Beauty, when it first launched in 2017. Her campaign portfolio includes also Pat McGrath's make-up line, Uniqlo, Topshop, and Jones New York.

In 2015, Anderson was selected for the Victoria's Secret Fashion Show, after third casting, and has since walked in the show for 4 consecutive years. In April 2019, she became, as the sixth Black and first British Black model, Victoria's Secret Angel.

She was ranked as a "Money Girl" by models.com She was recognized for her beauty by being included in the "World's Beautiful Women" list curated by What's Good?.

In 2016, she created the LAPP blog (Leomie Anderson, the Project, the Purpose), later known as LAPP Magazine, to provide insight and awareness about women’s mental health, rights and body consciousness, promoting female empowerment. In part to support the platform, she has founded her own clothing brand, LAPP The Brand, which was launched in September 2016. Anderson developed a line of women’s athletic garments, which can be worn as fashion or as active wear.

As a women's rights activist, Anderson gave two TEDx Talks, and spoke at Oxford and Cambridge universities. She has been vocal about racial discrimination in the modelling industry.

In April 2021, she debuted her podcast, Role Model with Leomie Anderson (Somethin’ Else, Sony Music), to "speak to international superstars who are breaking boundaries and shaping culture."

In 2023, Anderson replaced Maya Jama as presenter of popular BBC television series Glow Up: Britain's Next Make-Up Star. After three series, she announced she will be leaving the show.

In February 2025, Anderson appeared as a contestant on Netflix's Celebrity Bear Hunt, alongside 11 other celebrities. She was the first to be eliminated by Bear Grylls. Later, in October 2025, she appeared in the Battle of the Nations special of The Weakest Link.

In 2026, Anderson is set to appear on the twenty-sixth series of I'm A Celebrity... Get Me Out of Here!

== Awards ==
- 2017 Yahoo’s Diversity in Beauty Awards – Model Activist

== Filmography ==
=== Television ===
Year	Title	Role
2022	RuPaul's Drag Race UK	Series 4; Guest judge
2023–2026	Glow Up: Britain's Next Make-Up Star	Series 5-7; Host
2023	Celebrity Gogglebox	Series 5; Herself
2025	Celebrity Bear Hunt	Series 1; Herself
2025	The Weakest Link	Series 5; Contestant
2026	I'm a Celebrity... Get Me Out of Here!	Series 26; Contestant
