= Glow Up: Britain's Next Make-Up Star series 3 =

2021 series of Glow Up

Glow Up: Britain's Next Make-Up Star
- Series 3
- Presented by: Maya Jama
- Judges: Dominic Skinner; Val Garland
- No. of contestants: 10
- Winner: Sophie Baverstock
- Runner-up: Craig Hamilton
- No. of episodes: 8

Release
- Original network: BBC Three
- Original release: 20 April – 8 June 2021

Series chronology
- ← Previous; Series 2 Next → Series 4

The third series of Glow Up: Britain's Next Make-Up Star began on 20 April 2021 on BBC Three, and concluded on 8 June 2021. The series was hosted by Maya Jama, and was judged by industry professionals Dominic Skinner and Val Garland. Due to this series being filmed in the heart of the COVID-19 pandemic, there were strict measures in place to restrict the virus being spread between contestants.

== Contestants ==
Contestant	Age (Note: Ages stated are at time of contest)	Hometown	Profession	Outcome
Sophie Baverstock	21	London (Note: At the time of filming Glow Up season 3, Sophie was studying at an Arts University in Bournemouth)	Makeup artist and student	Winner
Craig Hamilton	24	London (Note: Originally from Northern Ireland)	Makeup artist	Runner-up
Dolli Okoriko	26	London	Professional makeup artist	3rd place
Jack Oliver	27	London	Professional Make-Up / Hair Artist & Influencer	4th place
Ryley Isaac	19	London	Beauty Guru and influencer	5th place
Samah Bouchaâra	31	London	Pro-Makeup artist fashion/beauty/editorial/red carpet & bridal specialist	6th place
Alex Ogden Clark	27	Liverpool	Makeup artist	7th place
Xavi Guillaume	23	London	Journalist and makeup artist	8th place
Elliott Banks	27	London	Photographer, artist and creative designer	9th place
Nicole "Nic" Marilyn	28	London	Founder, CEO DiscoDust London & freelance makeup artist	10th place

== Contestant progress ==
Contestant	1	2	3	4	5	6	7	8	
Sophie	SAFE	SAFE	WIN	SAFE	SAFE	WIN	BTM2	SAFE	Winner
Craig	SAFE	WIN	SAFE	SAFE	WIN	SAFE	SAFE	SAFE	Runner-up
Dolli	SAFE	SAFE	WIN	WIN	BTM2	BTM2	SAFE	SAFE	Third Place
Jack	SAFE	SAFE	SAFE	SAFE	SAFE	SAFE	ELIM		
Ryley	SAFE	SAFE	SAFE	SAFE	SAFE	ELIM			
Samah	WIN	BTM2	SAFE	BTM2	ELIM				
Alex	SAFE	SAFE	BTM2	ELIM					
Xavi	SAFE	SAFE	ELIM						
Elliott	SAFE	ELIM							
Nic	ELIM								

The contestant won Glow Up.
The contestant was a runner-up.
The contestant came in third place.
The contestant won the challenge.
The contestant was originally in the red chair but later declared safe.
The contestant was originally safe but later up for elimination.
The contestant was in the red chair and still eligible for elimination.
The contestant won the challenge but was up for elimination, but not eliminated.
The contestant was originally safe but later up for elimination and was then further eliminated.
The contestant won the challenge but was eliminated.
The contestant decided to leave the competition.
The contestant was eliminated.

== Face offs ==
Episode	MUA			Challenge	Eliminated
1	Nic	vs.	Samah	Create a clumpy lash.	Nic
2	Elliott	vs.	Samah	Produce a red jewelled lip look.	Elliott
3	Alex	vs.	Xavi	Execute a timeless blue smokey eye.	Xavi
4	Alex	vs.	Samah	Create a pop art lip.	Alex
5	Dolli	vs.	Samah	Create a structured glitter eye.	Samah
6	Dolli	vs.	Ryley	Cover up a tattoo.	Ryley
7	Jack	vs.	Sophie	Create a full face gradient.	Jack
Episode	MUA			Challenge	Winner Of Glow Up
8 (Note: This episode was the top two to decide the winner, instead of the bottom two to decide who goes home.)	Craig	vs.	Sophie	Create a full beat using one colour only.	Sophie

The contestant was eliminated after their first time in the face off.
The contestant was eliminated after their second time in the face off.
The contestant was eliminated after their fourth time in the face off.
The contestant won the final face off and became Britain’s Next Make Up Star.

== Guest judges ==
- Ateh Jewel, beauty journalist and diversity campaigner
- Sherri Laurence, make-up department head on Pose
- Les Child, choreographer
- Cate Hall, lead hair and make-up designer on The Crown
- Abby Roberts, social media influencer
- Vanessa Spence, ASOS design director
- Loz Schiavo, make-up designer on Peaky Blinders
- Rankin, photographer and director
- Jonas Blue, DJ and music producer
- Lisa Eldridge, makeup artist

== Episodes ==
No. overall	No. in series	Title	Original release date
17	1	"Episode 1"	20 April 2021
Guest judge: Ateh Jewel; Professional Assignment: Design looks a beauty campaign for the health and beauty retailer Superdrug.; Professional Assignment winner: Samah; Creative Brief: Produce a look on themselves based on what makes them unique.; Bottom two: Nic and Samah; Face Off Challenge: Create a clumpy lash.; Eliminated: Nic
18	2	"Episode 2"	27 April 2021
Guest judge: Sherri Laurence and Les Child; Professional Assignment: Based on the team they are assigned to, either produce a look that looks like a black and white photo or produce a bizarre makeup look.; Professional Assignment winner: Craig; Creative Brief: Produce a look on a model based around the theme of freedom.; Bottom two: Elliott and Samah; Face Off Challenge: Produce a red jewelled lip look.; Eliminated: Elliott
19	3	"Episode 3"	4 May 2021
Guest judge: Cate Hall; Professional Assignment: Produce a look for The Crown based on famous looks of the British royal family.; Professional Assignment winners: Sophie and Dolli; Creative Brief: Produce a look on a model based on the work of an artist.; Bottom two: Xavi and Alex; Face Off Challenge: Produce a blue smokey eye look.; Eliminated: Xavi
20	4	"Episode 4"	11 May 2021
Guest judge: Abby Roberts; Professional Assignment: Produce a TikTok video about the process of a makeup look.; Professional Assignment winners: Dolli; Creative Brief: Produce a look on a model based on social media filters.; Bottom two: Alex and Samah; Face Off Challenge: Produce a pop art lip look.; Eliminated: Alex
21	5	"Episode 5"	18 May 2021
Guest judge: Vanessa Spence; Professional Assignment: Create a mascara-focused makeup look for a social media campaign for ASOS.; Professional Assignment winner: Craig; Creative Brief: Create an "out of this world" makeup look.; Bottom two: Dolli and Samah; Face Off Challenge: Produce a structured glittered eye.; Eliminated: Samah
22	6	"Episode 6"	25 May 2021
Guest judge: Loz Schiavo; Professional Assignment: Create a six month old scar and a fresh scar for actors on the set of Peaky Blinders.; Professional Assignment winner: Sophie; Creative Brief: Create a makeup look based on one of the seven deadly sins.; Bottom two: Ryley and Dolli; Face Off Challenge: Cover the star tattoos on the forearms of the models.; Eliminated: Ryley
23	7	"Episode 7"	1 June 2021
Guest judge: Jonas Blue and Rankin; Professional Assignment: Do the makeup for the dancers for Jonas Blue's music video.; Professional Assignment winner: Jack; Creative Brief: Create a look inspired by a guilty pleasure.; Bottom two: Jack and Sophie; Face Off Challenge: Create a full-face gradient using black and another colour.; Eliminated: Jack
24	8	"Episode 8"	8 June 2021
Guest judges: Lisa Eldridge; Professional Assignment: Host a make-up masterclass with an audience of industry professionals, influencers and reporters.; Creative Brief: Create a look that demonstrates what makes you unstoppable as a MUA.; Face Off Challenge: Create a full beat using different hues of one colour.; Third Place: Dolli; Runner-up: Craig; Winner: Sophie
