= Stacey Dooley =

English television presenter (born 1987)

Stacey Dooley MBE
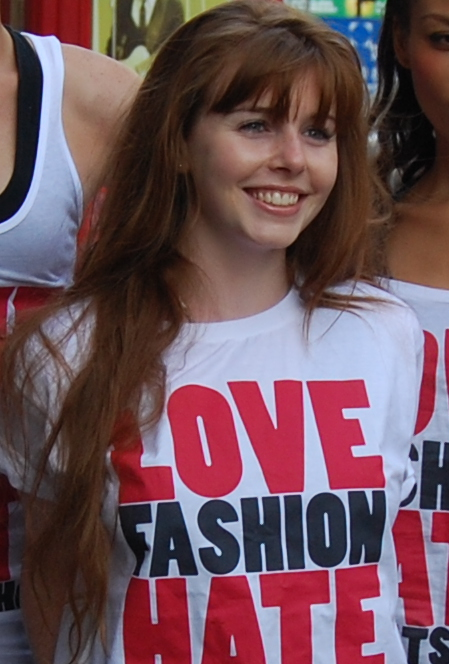
- Dooley at an event organised by War on Want in 2009 protesting against sweatshops
- Born: 9 March 1987 (age 39); Luton, Bedfordshire, England
- Occupations: Television presenter; journalist; media personality
- Years active: 2008–present
- Employer: BBC
- Television: Blood, Sweat and T-shirts; Stacey Dooley Investigates; Strictly Come Dancing; Glow Up: Britain's Next Make-Up Star; Stacey Dooley Sleeps Over
- Partner: Kevin Clifton (2019–present)
- Children: 1

Stacey Dooley MBE (born 9 March 1987) is an English television presenter, investigative journalist, and media personality. She came to prominence in 2008 as a participant on the documentary series Blood, Sweat and T-shirts. Following the series, she has made social issue-themed television documentaries for BBC Three concerning child labour and women in developing countries.

In 2018, Dooley published her debut book, On the Front Line with the Women Who Fight Back, which became a Sunday Times Bestseller. That same year, she won the sixteenth series of the BBC One dancing competition show Strictly Come Dancing with her professional dance partner and now boyfriend Kevin Clifton. From 2019 to 2020, she presented the BBC Three reality show Glow Up: Britain's Next Make-Up Star. In 2024, Dooley made her stage debut in the West End play 2:22 A Ghost Story.

Dooley was appointed a Member of the Order of the British Empire (MBE) in the 2018 Birthday Honours for services to broadcasting.

== Early life and education ==
Stacey Dooley was born on 9 March 1987 in Luton, Bedfordshire. Her father was from Ireland and left the family when she was two years old. He was an alcoholic who died when Dooley was in her 20s, before they had reconciled.

She grew up in Luton and studied at Stopsley High School. She worked as a shop assistant, selling perfumes at Luton Airport. She also worked in a hair salon in Bramingham. Dooley admitted to going through a short phase of shoplifting with her friends during her youth in Luton. Around that time, she also dated a drug dealer.

== Career ==
=== 2008–2017: Career beginnings and Stacey Dooley Investigates ===
Dooley first appeared on television in April 2008 when she travelled to India as one of the participants on the documentary television series Blood, Sweat and T-shirts. Dooley and the other participants were selected to illustrate the typical fashion-obsessed consumer. Thanks to her appearance on the show, and partly because of her interest in labour laws in developing countries, a series was commissioned with Dooley as presenter. Stacey Dooley Investigates began in August 2009 and a two-part special was shown on BBC Three throughout August and September 2009. It also aired in Australia on ABC2 from 2 June 2010. In October 2010, BBC Three aired two further programmes, the first on former child soldiers in the Democratic Republic of Congo and the second on sex trafficking and underage sex slavery in Cambodia.

In 2011, BBC Three aired Tourism and the Truth: Stacey Dooley Investigates. Over two episodes, Dooley investigated how tourism in Thailand and Kenya affects employees there, in particular with regard to wages, corruption and environmental changes. Dooley also presented the CBBC series Show Me What You're Made Of and spin off series Show Me What You're Made Of UK.

Filmed in Dooley's hometown of Luton, My Hometown Fanatics was broadcast on BBC Three on 20 February 2012. In the programme, Dooley interviewed Islamists and the English Defence League. A three-part series titled Coming Here Soon was broadcast on BBC Three in June and July 2012, in which Dooley explored the lives of young people in three countries affected by the 2008 financial crisis: Greece, Ireland and Japan. The programme on Japan was criticised by some because it ignored the Samaritans guidelines on reporting of suicide. While Dooley was in the United States in 2012, she created two series of Stacey Dooley in the USA where she investigated issues affecting teens across America such as: Girls Behind Bars, Border Wars, Homelessness and Kids in the Crossfire. In 2015, Dooley created the documentary series Beaten By My Boyfriend where she investigated domestic abuse within the UK.

In 2016, Dooley presented Stacey Dooley in Cologne: The Blame Game, about the 2015 New Year's Eve sexual assaults in Germany, which aired on 29 January. She also presented Stacey Dooley: Hate and Pride in Orlando where she travelled to Orlando, Florida in the aftermath of the Pulse Bar shootings. On 30 July, Dooley appeared on the BBC's Celebrity Mastermind where her specialist subject was the television series Girls.

In November 2016, Dooley appeared in a BBC Three series Brainwashing Stacey, where she went to a US anti-abortion summer camp and then to some African big-game hunters. Stacey also made a documentary Sex in Strange Places for which she travelled to Turkey, Brazil and Russia to explore people's different attitudes towards sex and prostitution. In January 2019, Dooley received criticism for having falsely portrayed a Turkish woman as a Syrian sex worker in Istanbul in an episode of Sex in Strange Places. The controversy led to the episode being removed from BBC iPlayer.

In December 2016, Dooley was stopped by police in Tokyo while filming Young Sex For Sale In Japan, a documentary about child sexual exploitation in that country. She was held on the street for two hours by police who were investigating their confrontation with two men "protecting" some of the girls, who had called the police on the film crew. After initially being confronted by two men who demanded "no movies", the pair tried to use physical force against the film crew to make them leave the area. The story was released a few days before the programme was made available in February 2017.

In 2017, Dooley presented CBBC's The Pets Factor. She also presented the documentary Canada's Lost Girls in March 2017 in which she travelled across Canada investigating the various factors which played a part in the disappearance and murder of over 1,200 Indigenous women. Dooley narrated the documentary The Natives: This Is Our America which investigated the lives of young Native Americans and the Dakota Access Pipeline protests.

=== 2018–present ===
In April 2018, Dooley took part in a BBC show, Celebrities on the NHS Front-line, to celebrate the 70th birthday of the National Health Service. In the 2018 series of Stacey Dooley Investigates, she travelled to Russia, Florida, Iraq and Hungary to explore more challenging issues such as child exploitation, sex offenders, war, domestic violence, pollution in the fashion industry and coming face-to-face with an ISIS soldier for which she won a One World Media Award. The episodes of this series won the title of the Most Watched Documentaries on BBC iPlayer.

Dooley published her first book in February 2018, Stacey Dooley, On the Front Line with the Women Who Fight Back. The book has topics concerning sex trafficking, domestic violence, sex equality and child exploitation and became a Sunday Times Bestseller. She also had her own UK book tour, hosted by Viv Groskop.

Dooley was appointed a Member of the Order of the British Empire (MBE) in the 2018 Birthday Honours for services to broadcasting. In 2012, and again in 2015, Dooley was a member of the judging panel for The Observer Ethical Awards.

On 16 August 2018, Dooley was announced as the eighth contestant to take part in the sixteenth series of Strictly Come Dancing. On 15 December 2018, she won the series with her dance partner Kevin Clifton. Following her win, shortly afterwards the BBC announced Dooley as co-presenter of New Year Live on BBC One, with another Strictly 2018 contestant, Joe Sugg. She also took part in BBC One's Children in Need where she explored the number of homeless young people in the UK.

Dooley was criticised in February 2019 after she posted photos holding a Ugandan child on her Instagram account during a trip to Uganda organised by British charity Comic Relief. Dooley was accused by British MP David Lammy on social media of reinforcing white saviour stereotypes. Lammy tweeted in response to a news story about Dooley: "The world does not need any more white saviours. As I've said before, this just perpetuates tired and unhelpful stereotypes. Let's instead promote voices from across the continent of Africa and have serious debate." Ugandan campaign group No White Saviours wrote on Dooley's Instagram: "White saviourism is a symptom of white supremacy and something we all have to work together to deconstruct." Gaby Hinsliff, a columnist at The Guardian wrote: "The sight of celebrities making weepy 'personal journeys' towards understanding poverty has begun to feel more and more crass, especially where it overshadows the people whose experiences they're meant to be understanding in the first place." Dooley told The Guardian she had no regrets over the incident. In June 2019, Comic Relief founder Richard Curtis told members of the British Parliament that the charity would stop sending celebrities abroad as a consequence of the controversy.

In 2019, Dooley was named as Grazia's new contributing editor for investigations. She appeared on The National Television Awards 2019 and presented BBC's The Nine To Five With Stacey Dooley and The One Show. Dooley took part in The 2019 Strictly Come Dancing Arena Tour throughout the UK. Dooley then began presenting the BBC Three reality competition series Glow Up: Britain's Next Make-Up Star. In July 2019, it was announced that Dooley would be a guest judge on RuPaul's Drag Race UK. In August 2019, she released the documentaries Stacey Meets the IS Brides and Stacey Dooley: Face to Face with The Bounty Hunters which became the most watched documentary on BBC IPlayer.

In 2020, Dooley appeared in Jessie Ware's music video for "Save a Kiss" and the game show Michael McIntyre's The Wheel. Dooley also appeared in a new episode of Stacey Dooley Investigates "The Whale Hunters"

In 2021, Dooley, with Turi King, presented the BBC programme DNA Family Secrets which helps people solve family mysteries regarding their ancestry, missing relatives and genetic diseases.

In 2022, Dooley competed in series 2 of The Masked Dancer as Prawn Cocktail.

Dooley made her stage debut as Jenny in 2:22 A Ghost Story at the Gielgud Theatre in May 2024. Her final show was in August of that year.

== Personal life ==
Dooley is a feminist and has made documentaries regarding gender equality.

Since early 2019, Dooley has been in a relationship with her Strictly Come Dancing dance partner Kevin Clifton. In August 2022, Dooley confirmed via Instagram that she was expecting a baby with Clifton. In January 2023, she gave birth to their daughter.

== Honours and awards ==
Dooley was appointed a Member of the Order of the British Empire (MBE) in the 2018 Birthday Honours for services to broadcasting.

In 2018, the programme Stacey Dooley: Face to Face with ISIS received the Popular Features Award at the One World Media Awards.

== Filmography ==
=== Television ===
Year	Title	Role	Notes
2008	Blood, Sweat and T-shirts	Participant	
2009–present	Stacey Dooley Investigates	Presenter	
2011–2017	Show Me What You're Made Of	Presenter	
2012	My Hometown Fanatics	Presenter	3 episodes
2012	Coming Here Soon	Presenter	
2012	Superstorm USA: Caught on Camera	Narrator	
2012–2014	Stacey Dooley in the USA	Presenter	2 series
2015	Beaten by My Boyfriend	Presenter	Documentary
2015	Celebrity Mastermind	Contender	1 episode
2015	O'Brien	Guest	1 episode
2015–2016	The Wright Stuff	Guest Panellist	5 episodes
2015–2016	Don't Tell the Bride	Presenter	4 episodes
2016	Brainwashing Stacey	Presenter	
2016	Sex in Strange Places	Presenter	1 series
2016	Stacey on the Frontline	Presenter	
2017	The Natives: This is Our America	Narrator	
2017–2018	The Pets Factor	Presenter	Series 1–4
2019	Face To Face With Armageddon	Presenter	Documentary
2019	Strictly Come Dancing	Contestant	Winner of sixteenth series with Kevin Clifton
2019	Young and Homeless	Presenter	Documentary
2019	Fashion's Dirty Secrets	Presenter	Documentary
2018–2020	The One Show	Guest Presenter	8 episodes
2019	RuPaul's Drag Race UK	Guest	1 episode
2019	Would I Lie to You?	Guest	1 episode
2019	Have I Got News for You	Guest	1 episode
2019	Panorama	Presenter	2 episodes
2019–2020	Glow Up: Britain's Next Make-Up Star	Presenter	Series 1-2
2019–2021	The Last Leg	Panellist	6 episodes
2019–present	Stacey Dooley Sleeps Over	Presenter	Also producer
2020	The Wall	Contestant	1 episode
2020	EastEnders: Secrets from the Square	Presenter	14 episodes
2020	Stacey Dooley: On the Psych Ward	Presenter	Documentary
2021	This Is MY House	Presenter	Series 1; 6 episodes
2021	DNA Family Secrets	Presenter	3 episodes
2021	The Great Celebrity Bake Off for SU2C	Contestant	Series 4, Episode 4
2021	Back on the Psych Ward	Presenter	Documentary
2021–2022	The Wheel	Contestant	2 episodes
2021–2022	Loose Women	Guest	2 episodes
2022	Two Daughters	Presenter	Documentary
2022	Stalkers	Presenter	Two-part series
2022	Inside the Convent	Presenter	Documentary
2022	Hungry for It	Presenter	Cookery competition series
2022	The Masked Dancer	Prawn Cocktail / Contestant	Series 2
2022	Blankety Blank	Panellist	Series 19, Episode 6
2022	Celebrity Lingo	Contestant	1 episode
2022	Celebrity Catchphrase	Contestant	1 episode
2023	Michael McIntyre's Big Show	Guest	Series 6, Episode 5
2023	Stacey Dooley: Ready for War?	Presenter	One off
2023	Stacey Dooley: Inside the Undertakers	Presenter	One off
2023–	Stacey Dooley Sleeps Over USA	Presenter	Also producer
2025	Stacey Dooley: Meet the Shoplifters	Presenter	One off
2025	Stacey Dooley: Rape on Trial	Presenter	One off
2025	Stacey Dooley: Growing Up Gypsy	Presenter	One off
2026	The Clickbait Clinic with Stacey Dooley	Presenter	Six-part documentary series
2026	Stacey Dooley: Fallen Women	Presenter	One off
2026	Stacey Dooley's Australia: Off the Beaten Track	Presenter	Six-part travelogue series
TBA	Stacey Dooley Cleans Up (w/t)	Presenter	Upcoming twelve-part documentary series
TBA	Stacey Dooley: Death In The Barracks (w/t)	Presenter	Upcoming documentary
TBA	Stacey Dooley: Down The K-Hole	Presenter	Upcoming documentaries

== Bibliography ==
- Stacey Dooley (2018). On the Front Line with the Women Who Fight Back. Ebury Publishing. ISBN 978-1-78594-299-0.
- Stacey Dooley (2023). Are You Really OK?: Understanding Britain's Mental Health Emergency. BBC Books. ISBN 978-1785947032.
