= Guessable =

British TV panel show

- Genre: Panel show
- Presented by: Sara Pascoe
- Starring: Alan Davies; Darren Harriott; John Kearns
- Country of origin: United Kingdom
- Original language: English
- No. of series: 4
- No. of episodes: 44

Production
- Executive producers: Jordan Read; Tom Baker; Juliet Redden
- Running time: 60 mins (incl. adverts)
- Production company: Tuesday’s Child

Original release
- Network: Comedy Central UK
- Release: 5 October 2020 – 17 July 2023

Guessable is a British panel show broadcast on Comedy Central UK, in which panelists play games that revolve around guessing. It began its run in October 2020 and was renewed for a second series of twelve episodes in March 2021. The show is hosted by Sara Pascoe with assistant John Kearns and has team captains Alan Davies and Darren Harriott. In November 2021, the show was confirmed to be returning for a third series of 12 episodes, which began in January 2022, and resumed on 5 September 2022.

A fourth series was confirmed in September 2022 and began airing in January 2023.

== Format ==
Each episode typically has 5 rounds with a final extra game where the contestant have to guess the identity of a mystery celebrity that has ties to all the answers called in that episode. Round formats include 'What Am I', where one guest sticks their head through various cut-outs and has to guess who they are, based on the cutout, 'Say It Properly', where contestants have to guess a word represented by a series of props on a board, 'What Are You Porking About?', where each contestant on one team gets a box and two have to lie about an object being in theirs while one tells the truth. The other team then has to guess who actually has an object in their box.

The episode always ends with an extra round where panelists must guess the identity of a mystery celebrity. Clues to the identity come in the form of correct answers from previous rounds – each of them is tied to the celebrity in some way.

== Episodes ==
The coloured backgrounds denote the result of each of the shows:

– indicates Alan's team won
– indicates Darren's team won
– indicates the game ended in a draw

=== Series 1 (2020) ===
No. in series	Title	Alan's Team	Darren's Team	Winning team	Original release date	Viewership
1	"Alan and the Stripy Horse"	Clare Balding; Jason Manford	Russell Kane; Dane Baptiste	Darren	5 October 2020	276,984
2	"Alan and Lincoln's Wooden Teeth"	Martin Kemp; Aisling Bea	Jessica Knappett; Miles Jupp	Darren	12 October 2020	186,387
3	"Darren, The Frog and The Rabbit"	Ellie Taylor; Phil Wang	Mark Watson; Kiri Pritchard-McLean	Alan	19 October 2020	170,010
4	"Alan & Some Pancetta On the Side"	Dev Griffin; Suzi Ruffell	Jason Manford; Angela Scanlon	Alan	26 October 2020	166,728
5	"Darren & Some Eaton Love"	Tom Allen; Debbie McGee	Judi Love; Ivo Graham	Alan	2 November 2020	189,322
6	"Darren & The Creepy Cherub"	Ahir Shah; Laura Whitmore	Eamonn Holmes; Harriet Kemsley	Alan	9 November 2020	167,103
7	"Darren & Some Potatoes"	Konnie Huq; Nathan Caton	Aisling Bea; Hal Cruttenden	Darren	16 November 2020	159,482
8	"Alan & The Very Strange Baby"	Cariad Lloyd; Larry Dean	Phil Wang; Natalie Cassidy	Alan	23 November 2020	196,813

=== Series 2 (2021) ===
No. in series	Title	Alan's Team	Darren's Team	Winning team	Original release date	Viewership
1	"Darren and the Purply Rainbow"	Roisin Conaty; Craig Revel Horwood	Nish Kumar; Huge Davies	Darren	13 April 2021	164,827
2	"Alan and An Embroidery of Chris Tarrant"	Richard Madeley; Kemah Bob	Clare Balding; Joel Dommett	Alan	20 April 2021	152,295
3	"Alan and a Spread of Meat Loaf"	Chris Kamara; Kerry Godliman	Alex Jones; Lou Sanders	Darren	27 April 2021	149,007
4	"Alan and an Emergency Exit"	Kiri Pritchard-McLean; Alex Brooker	Jason Manford; Rachel Parris	Alan	4 May 2021	147,685
5	"Darren and His Dancing Face"	Oti Mabuse; Miles Jupp	David Baddiel; Maisie Adam	Darren	11 May 2021	123,479
6	"Alan and Mr Scrabble"	Katherine Ryan; Gyles Brandreth	Ed Gamble; Scarlett Moffatt	Draw	18 May 2021	153,845
7	"Darren and the Tea Cup"	Emily Atack; Jason Manford	Jamie Laing; Rose Matafeo	Alan	25 May 2021	104,160
8	"Darren and the Worm with Wings"	Susie Dent; Russell Kane	Nick Helm; Desiree Burch	Alan	1 June 2021	128,258
9	"Alan and Henning Battle for Second Place"	Henning Wehn; Olga Koch	Jordan North; Katherine Ryan	Darren	8 June 2021	127,425
10	"Maisie and the Puffin Crossing"	Maisie Adam; Bobby Mair	Richard Madeley; Zoe Lyons	Alan	15 June 2021	132,350
11	"Sara and Her Quiz Nemesis"	Joanne McNally; Aaron Simmonds	Rick Edwards; Big Zuu	Alan	22 June 2021	92,042
12	"Gyles and the Teddy Bear Massacre"	Kae Kurd; Denise Van Outen	Rhys James; Catherine Bohart	Darren	29 June 2021	147,739

=== Series 3 (2022) ===
No. in series	Title	Alan's Team	Darren's Team	Winning team	Original release date	Viewership
1	"Sausage Fingers"	Miles Jupp; Maisie Adam	Henning Wehn; Jason Manford	Alan	10 January 2022	105,967
2	"Rosie Jones Will Fight You"	Roisin Conaty; Archie Maddocks	Rosie Jones; Ed Byrne	Darren	17 January 2022	87,566
3	"Darren and The Funny One From Friends"	Nick Helm; Shaun Ryder	Sindhu Vee; Melvin Odoom	Alan	24 January 2022	118,749
4	"Is Pumping A Young Man's Game"	Harriet Kemsley; Brian Conley	Ranj Singh; Bec Hill	Alan	31 January 2022	136,724
5	"A Little Whiff of Cheese"	Rachel Parris; Lucy Beaumont	Ivo Graham; The Vivienne	Darren	7 February 2022	176,545
6	"Craig & The Ball Gag"	Kiri Pritchard-McLean; Craig Revel Horwood	Vernon Kay; Jo Brand	Alan	14 February 2022	120,373
7	"It's not Erotic"	Jason Manford; Jessie Cave	Mike Wozniak; Babatunde Aléshé	Darren	21 February 2022	N/A (<73,300) (Note: Not reported in the weekly top 15 programmes for four-screen viewer ratings.)
8	"Every Time You Say That We Lose"	Katy Wix; Sarah Kendall	Gyles Brandreth; Nick Helm	Darren	28 February 2022	N/A
9	"I Can't Find My Speedos"	Fred Sirieix; Jo Brand	Rhys James; Dani Dyer	Alan	10 March 2022 (Note: Originally scheduled for 7 March 2022.)	N/A
10	"Fictitious Cheese"	Ranvir Singh; Olga Koch	David Baddiel; Donna Preston	Alan	5 September 2022 (Note: Originally scheduled for broadcast in March 2022, but was "postponed at short notice".)	N/A
11	"Sugar Puff Daddy"	Lou Sanders; Roman Kemp	Alex Horne; Janet Street-Porter	Darren	12 September 2022	53,000
12	"A Couple Of Floaters and An Inkling"	Alfie Brown; Ria Lina	Fern Brady; Kerry Howard	Alan	19 September 2022	79,000
-	"Christmas Special"	Roisin Conaty; Kemah Bob	James Acaster; Gyles Brandreth	Darren	24 December 2022	N/A (<32,000) (Note: Not reported in the weekly top 50 programmes.)

=== Series 4 (2023) ===
No. in series	Title	Alan's Team	Darren's Team	Winning team	Original release date	Viewership
1	"The Return of the Fly"	Michael Dapaah; Harriet Kemsley	Nick Helm; Helen Bauer	Darren	25 January 2023	N/A (<40,000)
2	"In retrospect that was an error"	Amy Gledhill; Dan Tiernan	Nish Kumar; Kiri Pritchard-McLean	Darren	1 February 2023	N/A
3	"Oh wait there's more clues"	Sophie Duker; Rosie Jones	Fatiha El-Ghorri; Jamie Laing	Alan	8 February 2023	49,000
4	"Darren and his bigfoot"	Ivo Graham; Stevie Martin	Rachel Parris; Eshaan Akbar	Alan	15 February 2023	61,000
5	"I live and breathe Lou Bega"	Lou Sanders; Toussaint Douglass	The Vivienne; Mike Wozniak	Alan	22 February 2023	77,000
6	"How long is a piece of string"	Maisie Adam; Snoochie Shy	Josh Pugh; Josh Jones	Darren	1 March 2023	41,000
7	"James's smelly cocktail"	Lara Ricote; James Acaster	Michael Odewale; Vicky Pattison	Alan	19 June 2023	N/A
8	"Turns out I'm not a good loser"	Maisie Adam; Nish Kumar	Chris McCausland; Suzi Ruffell	Alan	26 June 2023	N/A
9	"Uncle Cool"	Sam Campbell; Thanyia Moore	Rosie Jones; Jordan Gray	Alan	3 July 2023	N/A
10	"Thinking Inside the Box"	Ria Lina; Scarlett Moffatt	Amy Gledhill; Glenn Moore	Alan	10 July 2023	N/A
11	"Confetti Tastes Like Salt"	Olga Koch; Joe Sugg	Remi Burgz; Fin Taylor	Alan	17 July 2023	N/A
