= Alan Davies: As Yet Untitled =

British television series

- Genre: Comedy talk show
- Presented by: Alan Davies
- Country of origin: United Kingdom
- Original language: English
- No. of series: 7
- No. of episodes: 66

Production
- Producer: Dave Skinner
- Running time: 60 minutes (inc. adverts)

Original release
- Network: Dave
- Release: 16 June 2014 – 9 May 2023

Alan Davies: As Yet Untitled is a British television programme that was first broadcast on Dave and hosted by comedian Alan Davies. In each episode Davies holds an unscripted roundtable discussion with four guests. The guests include stand-up comedians, comedy writers and other well-known figures in the entertainment industry. Each episode begins untitled, hence the series name, but a title is chosen at the conclusion of the episode, often a full or paraphrased quote from one of the guest's anecdotes.

As Yet Untitled, recorded in Riverside Studios, began airing with a five-episode series plus a compilation episode in June 2014. The show returned in January 2015, recorded in The Hospital Club, for a ten-part second series with another compilation episode. A third series containing ten episodes began in November 2015, alongside both a compilation episode and Christmas special. The fourth series of ten episodes aired in June 2016. The fifth series, lasting eight episodes, started in February 2017. The sixth series of ten episodes was recorded in The Roundhouse and aired from July 2021. After another brief break, a seventh series was recorded late in 2022 in the Grand Hall at the Battersea Arts Centre, and started airing in March 2023.

== Episode list ==
=== Series 1 (2014) ===
| No. | # | Original air date | Guests | Title chosen |
|---|---|---|---|---|
| 1 | 1 | 16 June 2014 | Noel Fielding, Jon Ronson, Andrew Maxwell and Kerry Godliman | Cupped By A Shammy (Chamois) Hand |
| 2 | 2 | 17 June 2014 | Jason Byrne, Richard Herring, Phill Jupitus and Jessica Hynes | Sex is Fun |
| 3 | 3 | 18 June 2014 | Bob Mortimer, John Robins, Marcus Brigstocke and Katherine Ryan | The Bringer of Spiders |
| 4 | 4 | 19 June 2014 | Bill Bailey, Kevin Eldon, Isy Suttie and Craig Campbell | Until I'm Married or You're Dead |
| 5 | 5 | 20 June 2014 | Ross Noble, Liza Tarbuck, Colin Lane and Josie Long | Jarvis Cocker's Britpop Herd |
| 29 | 6 | 15 March 2016 | Compilation episode – "The Unseen Bits of Series 1" | Were you on the South Bank show last night? |

=== Series 2 (2015) ===
A ten-part second series was filmed and broadcast in 2015 on Dave.

| No. | # | Original air date | Guests | Title chosen |
|---|---|---|---|---|
| 6 | 1 | 6 January 2015 | Tommy Tiernan, Jimmy Carr, Seann Walsh and Holly Walsh | Simple people eating complex carbohydrates |
| 7 | 2 | 13 January 2015 | Ben Miller, Lizzie Roper, Patrick Kielty and Felicity Ward | The pig knows you're frightened |
| 8 | 3 | 20 January 2015 | Stephen Mangan, Sarah Millican, Zoe Lyons and Hal Cruttenden | Two lesbians pissed on by bats |
| 9 | 4 | 27 January 2015 | David Baddiel, Sharon Horgan, James Brown and Nish Kumar | A British Asian comedian can no longer afford to buy a house because of James Brown |
| 10 | 5 | 3 February 2015 | Jo Brand, James Acaster, Sara Pascoe and Ricky Tomlinson | Thwarted sex pests |
| 11 | 6 | 10 February 2015 | Angela Barnes, Michael Ball, Ross Noble and Janet Street-Porter | Countryfile |
| 12 | 7 | 17 February 2015 | Grace Dent, David O'Doherty, Sean Kelly and Johnny Vegas | You Can Face Time or You Can Face This |
| 13 | 8 | 24 February 2015 | Matthew Crosby, Julian Clary, Shappi Khorsandi and Jack Dee | My father's would-be assassins |
| 14 | 9 | 3 March 2015 | Ardal O'Hanlon, Roisin Conaty, Rob Delaney and Elis James | Hello can I have a bath |
| 15 | 10 | 10 March 2015 | Germaine Greer, Lucy Beaumont, Jonathan Ross and Tom Wrigglesworth | The land of happy donkeys |
| 16 | 11 | 17 March 2015 | Compilation episode – "The Unseen Bits of Series 2" | The lips and arseholes of Alan Davies |

=== Series 3 (2015–16) ===
A ten-part third series (plus Christmas special) was broadcast on Dave.

| No. | # | Original air date | Guests | Title chosen |
|---|---|---|---|---|
| 17 | 1 | 3 November 2015 | Katherine Jakeways, Lee Mack, Nick Helm and Olivia Lee | I've Been Fingered By Captain Kirk |
| 18 | 2 | 10 November 2015 | Matt Lucas, John Thomson, Sarah Kendall and Stuart Goldsmith | Thirty-Five Quid for This |
| 19 | 3 | 17 November 2015 | Aisling Bea, Jim Moir, Justin Moorhouse and Jo Enright | I'm Locked In With A Ham and I'm Not Coming Out |
| 20 | 4 | 24 November 2015 | John Robins, Russell Howard, Reece Shearsmith and Tiffany Stevenson | It Must Have Been Big To Serve A Lot of People |
| 21 | 5 | 1 December 2015 | Bill Bailey, Diane Morgan, Steve Pemberton and Romesh Ranganathan | THAT IS A LIE |
| 22 | - | 23 December 2015 | Christmas special Richard Coles, Jo Joyner, Joe Lycett and Jason Manford | Salmon Mousse and Bullshit |
| 23 | 6 | 2 February 2016 | Bob Mortimer, Russell Kane, Lucy Montgomery and Miles Jupp | Watch Out, Wanky Bill's About |
| 24 | 7 | 9 February 2016 | Jo Brand, Chris Martin, Tommy Tiernan and Alun Cochrane | Loose Men with Chris Martin |
| 25 | 8 | 16 February 2016 | Phill Jupitus, Stuart Maconie, Pippa Evans and Carl Donnelly | No Smiling, No Laughing |
| 26 | 9 | 23 February 2016 | Jason Byrne, Denise Van Outen, Josh Widdicombe and Alice Levine | And Then He Deftly Grabbed My Cervix |
| 27 | 10 | 1 March 2016 | Charlie Higson, Sally Phillips, Johnny Vaughan and Ellie Taylor | Jokes About James Joyce and Ballet |
| 28 | 11 | 8 March 2016 | Compilation episode – "The Unseen Bits of Series 3" | Nigel Farage |

=== Series 4 (2016) ===
A ten-part fourth series was filmed during February–March 2016. and was broadcast on consecutive nights from 11 June 2016.

| No. | # | Original air date | Guests | Title chosen |
|---|---|---|---|---|
| 30 | 1 | 11 June 2016 | Stephen Fry, Sandi Toksvig, Sara Pascoe and Alex Edelman | I Don't Know If It Was the Embarrassment or the Narcotics, But I Have a Nose Bleed |
| 31 | 2 | 12 June 2016 | Catherine Tate, Milton Jones, Bryony Kimmings and Ainsley Harriott | A Clacker Free Zone |
| 32 | 3 | 13 June 2016 | Lou Sanders, Richard Ayoade, Katherine Parkinson and Harry Shearer | A Penis Poking Through the Window |
| 33 | 4 | 14 June 2016 | David Mitchell, Liza Tarbuck, Dane Baptiste and Lolly Adefope | Hitler & Jingle |
| 34 | 5 | 15 June 2016 | Jon Richardson, Mark Olver, Jenny Eclair and Alexei Sayle | Just Pop a Knife Near Your Penis |
| 35 | 6 | 16 June 2016 | Al Murray, Victoria Coren Mitchell, Luisa Omielan and Rob Beckett | Jaffa Cake Nipples |
| 36 | 7 | 17 June 2016 | Stephen K. Amos, Josh Howie, Bridget Christie and Eddie Izzard | Just the Moon and My Mum's Tits |
| 37 | 8 | 18 June 2016 | Jessica Hynes, Wes Borg, Deirdre O'Kane and Chris Addison | Carnal Happy Fun Times |
| 38 | 9 | 19 June 2016 | Mark Watson, Katy Wix, Karen Taylor and Jim Moir | Do I Know Him? I Shagged Him! |
| 39 | 10 | 20 June 2016 | Omid Djalili, Alex Horne, Shaun Ryder and Kathy Burke | Cream Cakes and Pernod |

=== Series 5 (2017) ===
An eight-part fifth series was broadcast from February to April 2017.

| No. | # | Original air date | Guests | Title chosen |
|---|---|---|---|---|
| 40 | 1 | 21 February 2017 | Jimmy Carr, Reginald D. Hunter, Alice Levine and Davina McCall | Captain Kirk and William Shatner Are Two Different People |
| 41 | 2 | 28 February 2017 | Bob Mortimer, Lizzie Roper, Tom Rosenthal and Gemma Whelan | They Burnt My Arse with a Chicken |
| 42 | 3 | 7 March 2017 | Patrick Kielty, Joe Lycett, Katherine Ryan and Annie Siddons | Free Pussy |
| 43 | 4 | 14 March 2017 | Melanie C, Jessica Knappett, Jamali Maddix and Ardal O'Hanlon | Frank Bruno was the Original Bus Driver |
| 44 | 5 | 21 March 2017 | David Baddiel, Beattie Edmondson, Elis James and Sindhu Vee | The Poxed Puppies of Leprous Bitches |
| 45 | 6 | 28 March 2017 | Katy Brand, Jack Dee, Ian Stone and Lou Sanders | Half of My Special Rose |
| 46 | 7 | 4 April 2017 | Gemma Cairney, Dave Johns, Lucy Porter and Reece Shearsmith | My Breasts Are At War |
| 47 | 8 | 11 April 2017 | Sanjeev Bhaskar, Susan Calman, Ivo Graham and Sophie Willan | Roll Your Trousers Up and Do A Krankie |

=== Series 6 (2021) ===
A ten-part sixth series started broadcasting in July 2021.

| No. | # | Original air date | Guests | Title chosen |
|---|---|---|---|---|
| 48 | 1 | 27 July 2021 | Darren Harriott, Sarah Keyworth, Angela Scanlon and Dara Ó Briain | Chin Chin Bitches |
| 49 | 2 | 3 August 2021 | Helen Bauer, Rachel Fairburn, Phil Wang and Harry Hill | Go Ahead, Motorboat Me |
| 50 | 3 | 10 August 2021 | Laura Smyth, Tez Ilyas, Sara Pascoe and Adrian Edmondson | Full Arse in the Bin |
| 51 | 4 | 17 August 2021 | Catherine Bohart, Chris McCausland, Thanyia Moore and Joe Lycett | Powerful Exposed Lips |
| 52 | 5 | 24 August 2021 | Lee Mack, Grace Campbell, Sara Barron and Babatunde Aléshé | I Scribbled On the Other Breast |
| 53 | 6 | 31 August 2021 | Toussaint Douglass, Desiree Burch, Jason Manford and Suzi Ruffell | My Vagina Smells of Sausages |
| 54 | 7 | 7 September 2021 | Joel Dommett, Rosie Jones, John Kearns and Sophie Duker | Very Loud and Very Rude |
| 55 | 8 | 14 September 2021 | Nina Conti, Morgana Robinson, Bill Bailey and Munya Chawawa | Don't Do A Punchline When I'm Swallowing |
| 56 | 9 | 21 September 2021 | Andy Field, Lou Sanders, Guz Khan and Geoff Lloyd | The Accuracy of a Pigeon |
| 57 | 10 | 28 September 2021 | Richard Ayoade, Harriet Kemsley, Joanne McNally and Jonny Pelham | A Hundred Quid, Nothing, Nothing, Vibrator |

=== Series 7 (2023) ===
| No. | # | Original air date | Guests | Title chosen |
|---|---|---|---|---|
| 58 | 1 | 14 March 2023 | Lara Ricote, Jamali Maddix, Josh Jones, and Sue Perkins | Magaluf And A Busy Nose |
| 59 | 2 | 21 March 2023 | Jason Byrne, Fatiha El-Ghorri, Helen Bauer, and Alex Jones | You'll Knock the Park Out of the Ball |
| 60 | 3 | 28 March 2023 | Stephen Mangan, Isy Suttie, Jordan Gray, and Seann Walsh | Well, Well, Well, We Seem to Have Caught Ourselves a Twat |
| 61 | 4 | 4 April 2023 | Patrick Kielty, Jessica Hynes, Amy Gledhill, and Emmanuel Sonubi | Français Champignons |
| 62 | 5 | 11 April 2023 | Russell Kane, London Hughes, Al Murray, and Fern Brady | Groped the King |
| 63 | 6 | 18 April 2023 | Jo Brand, Ola Labib, Jack Rooke, and Darren Harriott | I Come From Hastings |
| 64 | 7 | 25 April 2023 | Matt Edmondson, Archie Maddocks, Steph McGovern, and Ed Byrne | I Like It Dry |
| 65 | 8 | 2 May 2023 | Rachel Parris, Ellie Taylor, Johnny Vegas, and Josh Pugh | Your Man, Your Woman, Your Whatever |
| 66 | 9 | 9 May 2023 | Unseen footage from the series | Unseen |
