= Leicester Comedian of the Year =

British comedy award

- Awarded for: Best in comedy
- Sponsored by: Howes Percival LLP. Formerly Leicester Mercury
- Venue: Leicester Comedy Festival
- Country: United Kingdom
- First award: 1995; 31 years ago
- Currently held by: Chloe Reynolds (2026)
- Website: https://events.comedy-festival.co.uk/events/leicester-comedian-of-the-year-competition-2026/

The Howes Percival Leicester Comedian of the Year (previously known as the Leicester Mercury Comedian of the Year from 1995–2024), is held during the Leicester Comedy Festival every February. All the finalists picked are nominated by the UK's top comedy clubs and must meet certain criteria. The competition was sponsored by the Leicester Mercury, a local newspaper, for the first 30 editions. It is now sponsored by law firm Howes Percival LLP.

== Winners and finalists ==
=== 1990s ===
- 1995: Stevie Knuckles
- 1996: Jo Enright, Gary O’Donnell, Barry Train, Colin the Fireman, Marcus Cockrell, Bob May
- 1997: Johnny Vegas, Natalie Haynes, Kevin Kopfstein, Leslie Gibson
- 1998: Mitch Benn, Reginald D Hunter (2nd), TJ Murphy, Mark James, Mary Bourke, Pete Bennett, Johnny Kinch, Jack Mann, Darrel Martin,
- 1999: Patrick Kitterick, Dominic Frisbee, Meryl O’Rourke, Kevin Clarke, David Keay, Michael Tombs, Kat Nilsson

=== 2000s ===
- 2000: Jason Manford, Jason Whitehead, Silky, Sean O’Reilly, Barry Glendenning, Eddie Kaulkner
- 2001: Miles Jupp, Jimmy Carr, John Ryan, Adam Buss, Patrick Monahan
- 2002: Matt Blaize, Bill Wooland, Quincy, Rob Mager, Karen Bailey, Nick Gray, Kevin Dewsbury
- 2003: Rhod Gilbert, Greg Davies (2nd), Claire Pollard, Simon Amstell, Greg Cook, Donna Spence, Greg McHugh, Marek Larwood
- 2004: Matt Hollins, Russell Kane (2nd), Matt and Faron, Brandi Borr, Anna Keirle, Chris Roche, Mel Barnes, Matt Dyktynski
- 2005: Debra-Jane Appelby, Dave Longley, Peter Aterman, Lee Bannard, Lee Brace, Quentin Reynolds, Sam Avery
- 2006: James Branch, Emma Fryer
- 2007: Carl Donnelly, Sean Moran, Matt Rudge, Johnny Sorrow, Jason Kavan, Jim Smallman, Paul Smith
- 2008: Henry Paker, Jack Whitehall (2nd), Andi Osho, Gareth Richards, Helen Keen, Luke Benson, Sam Harlan, Tony Simpson
- 2009: Seann Walsh, Fergus Craig, Grainne Maquire, Joe Bor, Chris Stokes, Carl Hutchinson, Chris Ramsey, Tom Adams

=== 2010s ===
- 2010: Josh Widdicombe, Ivo Graham, Tom McDonnell, Jake Mills, Rob Beckett, Dan Bland, Ben Davids, Ade Ikoli
- 2011: Tom Rosenthal & Ben Target, Inel Tomlinson, Suzi Ruffell, Luke Benson, Henry Widdicombe, Michael J Dolan, Pete Walsh
- 2012: Matt Rees, Chris Turner, Darren Connell, Danny Sutcliffe, Richard Hanrahan, Joe Wells, Liam Williams
- 2013: Romesh Ranganathan, Lucy Beaumont, Adam Hess, Jamie Demetriou, Danny Ward, Tez Ilyas, Mark Simmons, Kwame Asante
- 2014: Kate Lucas, Phil Jerrod (2nd), Mark Silcox (3rd), Dane Baptiste, Dave Green, Elliot Green, Harriet Kemsley, Daisy Earl
- 2015: Tom Little, Ingrid Dahle (2nd), Stephanie Laing, Kiri Pritchard-McLean, Emma Kearney aka Penella Mellor, David Jordan, Jake Lambert, Lolly Adefope
- 2016: Tom Lucy, George Lewis (2nd), Rob Mulholland (3rd), Yuriko Kotani, Ed Patrick, Nigel Ng, Twayna Mayne, Travis Jay
- 2017: Alasdair Beckett-King, Sindhu Vee (2nd), Alex Mahoney, Ed Night, George Rigden, Kelly Convey, Tom Houghton, Tom Mayhew
- 2018: Jack Gleadow, Simon Lomas, Radu Isac, Martin Wratten, Helen Bauer, Catherine Bohart, Rosie Jones, Patrick Spicer
- 2019: Daniel Sofoluke, Simon Wozniak (2nd), Kathryn Mather (3rd), Jen Ives, Riordan DJ, Jeremy Flynn, Jamie Hutchinson, Krystal Evans

=== 2020s ===
- 2020: Eric Rushton, Matt Bragg (2nd), Louise Young (3rd), Good Kids, Omar Abid, Mustafa Yasin and Dinesh Nathan (Nina Gilligan had been billed to perform but had to cancel for health reasons).
- 2021: Nina Gilligan, Joseph Emslie (2nd), Christian Jegard (3rd), Hassan Dervish, Liz Guterbock, Jessie Nixon, Arielle Souma, Dan Tiernan.
- 2022: Firuz Ozari, John Meagher (2nd), Hayley Ellis, Sam Williams, Nick Elleray, Lucila San Martin, Louise Leigh, Ashish Suri.
- 2023: Daniel Petrie, Vittorio Angelone (2nd), Shalaka Kurup (3rd), Freya McGhee, Josephine Lacey, Mary Flanigan, Rahul Somia, Sergi Polo.
- 2024: Eva Bindeman, Blank Peng (2nd), Fiona Ridgewell (3rd), Alasdair Wallace, Alex Bertulis-Fernandes, Henry Michael, Julia Stenton, Romina Puma.
- 2025: Louise Atkinson, Andy Fox (2nd), Ant Dewson, Archit Goenka, Hannah Lawrence, June Tuesday, Lucas Jefcoate (James Ellis had been billed to perform but had to cancel for filming commitments)
- 2026: Chloe Reynolds, Valeria Vulpe (2nd), Jack Kelly (3rd), Ciara O’Connor, Sapphire McIntosh, Oliver Moore, Oro Rose
