= Downstairs at the King's Head =

Comedy venue in London, England

Coordinates: 51.5783°N 0.1243°W

- Downstairs
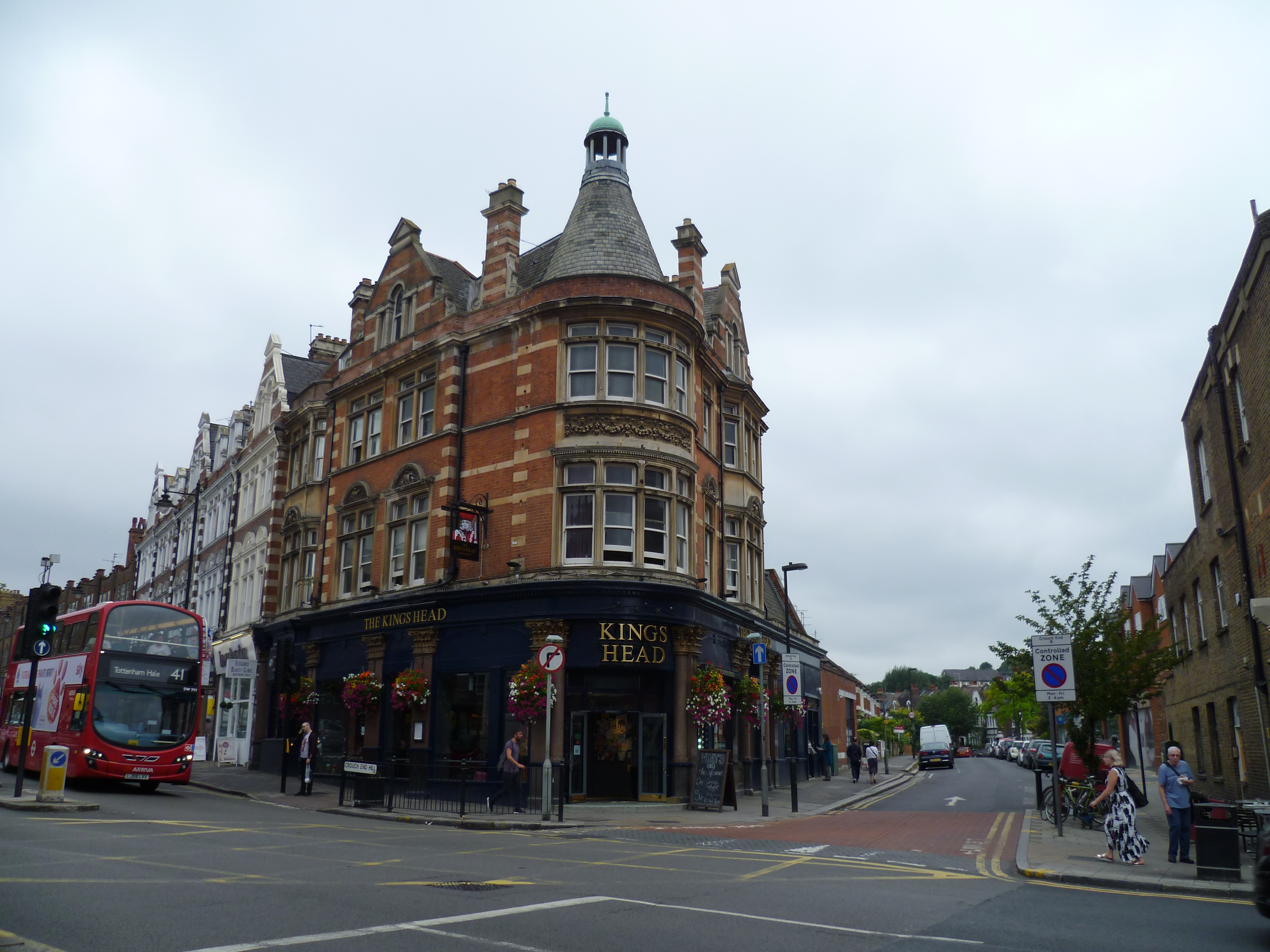
- Address: Crouch End, London; London; England
- Type: Comedy club
- Opened: 1981

Website
- http://www.downstairsatthekingshead.com

Downstairs at the King's Head is a comedy club located in Crouch End, London, England, opened in 1981.

Peter Grahame and Huw Thomas set up the venue to create an alternative comedy scene in north London. The club has a capacity of 100 people. Comedians to have appeared at the club include Rob Beckett, Nina Conti, Phil Wang and Ivo Graham.
