= Stand Up Central =

- Genre: Stand-up comedy
- Presented by: Russell Howard (2015–16); Chris Ramsey (2017); Rob Delaney (2018–)
- Country of origin: United Kingdom
- Original language: English
- No. of series: 4
- No. of episodes: 36

Production
- Producers: Jason Dawson (series 1–2); Mark Iddon (series 3–4)
- Running time: 30 minutes (including adverts)
- Production company: Avalon Television

Original release
- Network: Comedy Central
- Release: 29 April 2015 – present

Rob Delaney's Stand Up Central (formerly known as Russell Howard's Stand Up Central and Chris Ramsey's Stand Up Central) is a British stand-up comedy television show. It started broadcasting on Comedy Central on 29 April 2015, and ran for ten episodes.

The series features Delaney performing stand-up in front of a live audience at the Electric Ballroom in Camden and answering questions from social media. Each week also features two guests performing stand-up. The second series began broadcasting on 25 May 2016.

In 2017, it was announced a third series was ordered, with Chris Ramsey replacing Howard, who could not return to present the series due to touring commitments. In 2018, for the fourth series, the host was Rob Delaney.

== Episodes ==
=== Series 1 (2015) ===
Episode	Air date	Howard's topics	Guests
1x01	29 April 2015	Russell talks about running the Bath Half Marathon, discusses male massage and answers questions about time travel, feminism and Transformers.	Sara Pascoe, Nish Kumar
1x02	6 May 2015	Russell talks about the ridiculousness of homophobia, answers a question on bullying and sniffs the audience.	Rob Delaney, Tiff Stevenson
1x03	13 May 2015	Russell talks about kids of yesteryear, happiness and answers a question on time-travelling masturbation.	Joe Wilkinson, Sofie Hagen
1x04	27 May 2015	Russell reads Fifty Shades of Grey and answers questions on university, ghosts and milking a cow.	Doc Brown, Paul McCaffrey
1x05	3 June 2015	Russell talks masturbation in the cinema, uniform dating and answers questions on cannabis and super powers.	Katherine Ryan, Daniel Simonsen
1x06	10 June 2015	Russell talks weird people, twerking and Geordie Shore, and answers questions on the Yorkshire accent and penis puppy.	Andrew Maxwell, Phil Wang
1x07	17 June 2015	Russell explains the many ways his mum embarrasses him, and answers a question on bad Christmas presents.	Roisin Conaty, Sean McLoughlin
1x08	24 June 2015	Russell talks about an amusing ringtone, and answers questions on cats, wizards, and what cheers him up.	Carl Donnelly, Iain Stirling
1x09	1 July 2015	Russell explains Nigel Farage's worst nightmare and answers questions on signing boobs and the Queen's last words.	John Robins, Jarlath Regan
1x10	8 July 2015	Russell talks Mothering Sunday and people who state the obvious, plus answers questions on fame and the worst thing about school.	Nick Helm, Chris Kent

=== Series 2 (2016) ===
Episode	Air date	Howard's topics	Guests
2x1	25 May 2016	Russell talks bread, wonky vegetables and cleavage. Plus answers questions on Lego and self-pleasure in space	Jimmy Carr, Darren Harriott
2x2	1 June 2016	Russell talks erotic buckaroo, landline phones and weird sex, plus answers questions on literature and older women.	Joe Lycett, Rhys James
2x3	8 June 2016	Russell talks adult colouring in books and gluten, plus answers questions on the Queen's seduction methods and STD penguins.	Chris Ramsey, Yuriko Kotani
2x4	15 June 2016	Russell talks Tom Jones, pant throwing and RnB music with a West Country edge.	James Acaster, Kiri Pritchard McLean
2x5	22 June 2016	Russell talks jellyfish stings and brotherly love.	Bridget Christie, Ivo Graham
2x6	29 June 2016	Russell talks racial tension and lady wrestling, plus answers questions on YouTubers and tickling chickens.	Seann Walsh, Jonny Pelham
2x7	6 July 2016	Russell talks about being an uncle and middle class muggers, plus answers questions on how to get out of work.	Isy Suttie, Steve Williams
2x8	13 July 2016	Russell talks about his love of women, from their distinctive laughs to his mum's brilliant brain.	Josie Long, Stuart Goldsmith
2x9	20 July 2016	Russell answers questions on Percy Pigs, Marmite and Muslims and also reveals his most awkward sexual moment.	Tommy Tiernan, Steve Bugeja
2x10	27 July 2016	Russell talks about depressed dogs and regretful flashers, plus answers questions on sex from a virgin.	Ed Gamble, Fern Brady

=== Series 3 (2017) ===
Episode	Air date	Guests
3x1	27 September 2017	Al Murray, Desiree Burch
3x2	4 October 2017	Tez Ilyas, Joel Dommett
3x3	11 October 2017	Marlon Davis, Lee Nelson
3x4	18 October 2017	Tom Lucy, Nish Kumar
3x5	25 October 2017	Rose Matafeo, Dane Baptiste
3x6	1 November 2017	James Acaster, Pierre Novellie
3x7	8 November 2017	Carl Hutchinson, Tom Allen
3x8	15 November 2017	Jason Cook, Ellie Taylor

=== Series 4 (2018) ===
Episode	Air date	Guests
4x1	10 October 2018	Jon Richardson, Nigel Ng
4x2	17 October 2018	Sara Pascoe, Tom Ward
4x3	24 October 2018	Glenn Moore, Mo Gilligan
4x4	31 October 2018	Ahir Shah, Luisa Omielan
4x5	7 November 2018	Emily Lloyd-Saini, Iain Stirling
4x6	14 November 2018	Rob Auton, Suzi Ruffell
4x7	21 November 2018	Flo & Joan, Paul Chowdhry
4x8	28 November 2018	Adam Hess, Joe Wilkinson
