= The Dog Ate My Homework =

Children's panel show aired in Britain

- Genre: Children's; Panel game
- Developed by: Victoria Coker; Ed Morrish
- Directed by: Pati Marr
- Presented by: Iain Stirling (2014–2019); Guest Presenters (2019–2020); Lauren Layfield (2020–2021)
- Starring: Chris Lawrence; Stephanie Fulton (2014); Susan Morrison (2015); Ian West (2015–); Adam B (2019–2020); Reis Daniel (2020–)
- Narrated by: Charles Donnelly (2015–2016); Neil Macgillivray (2016–)
- Composer: Syncbox
- Country of origin: Scotland
- No. of series: 8
- No. of episodes: 97

Production
- Executive producers: Sara Harkins (2014–2015, 2016–); Yvonne Jennings (2016)
- Producers: Richard Grocock (2014); David Noble (2014); Margaret Anne Docherty (2014–2015); Chris Hulme (2016–present)
- Running time: 28 minutes
- Production company: CBBC Productions Scotland

Original release
- Network: CBBC
- Release: 17 January 2014 – 21 March 2021

The Dog Ate My Homework is a British children's panel show hosted by Lauren Layfield. It was first broadcast on 17 January 2014 and was originally hosted by the comedian Iain Stirling. The show is produced by CBBC Productions Scotland for CBBC.

Series 2 began on 23 January 2015, with a Christmas special aired on 16 December 2015. Series 3 began on 8 January 2016 and series 4 began on 4 November 2016. A fifth series was filmed from 17 November to 10 December 2017. Series 6 was the first not to be aired on Fridays, with it airing from 3 February 2019 at 8.30am for 12 weeks. After this series, it was announced that Stirling was leaving the show.

In series 7, four different presenters hosted three episodes each. Hacker T Dog was the first of these confirmed. Lauren Layfield, Suzi Ruffell and Darren Harriott also presented three episodes each. It was later announced that Layfield would host the show permanently from Series 8, joined by Reis Daniel playing the lovable Mr. Learner.

== Format ==
The show features two teams, both with a CBBC star, a comedian and a child. They compete in various games and tasks. The winning team get a gold star. Stirling can take, or give, gold stars whenever he wants. He usually gives them when an answer makes him laugh. Whoever has the most gold stars wins the game.

== Episodes ==
Series	Episodes	Originally released	
Series	Episodes	First released	Last released
1	10	17 January 2014	28 March 2014
2	11	23 January 2015	17 April 2015
Christmas Special		16 December 2015	
3	14	8 January 2016	28 March 2016
4	13	4 November 2016	24 February 2017
5	12	5 January 2018	23 March 2018
6	12	3 February 2019	21 April 2019
7	12	24 November 2019	16 February 2020
Christmas Special		16 December 2020	
8	11	10 January 2021	21 March 2021

=== Series 1 (2014) ===
No. overall	No. in series	Title	Directed by	Celebrity panelists	Child panelists	Air date
1	1	"Episode One"	Pati Marr	Romesh Ranganathan, Sam Fletcher, Bec Hill and Jack Carroll	Roma (1) and Jamie (1)	17 January 2014
Characters: Stephanie Fulton as The Dog, Chris Lawrence as Mr Smash, Eve Wengel as Eve From Class 4B Winners: Roma (1)'s team of Romesh and Sam
2	2	"Episode Two"	Pati Marr	Paul McCaffrey, Mark Rhodes, Victoria Cook and Sam Nixon	Holly and Grant	24 January 2014
Winners: Holly's team of Paul and Mark
3	3	"Episode Three"	Pati Marr	Susan Calman, Mawaan Rizwan, Ashleigh Butler and Dan Wright	Harley (1) and Callum	31 January 2014
Winners: Callum's team of Ashleigh and Dan
4	4	"Episode Four"	Pati Marr	Katie Mulgrew, Charlie Baker, Paul McCaffrey and Oyiza Momoh	Holly and Grant	7 February 2014
Winners: Grant's team of Paul and Oyiza
5	5	"Episode Five"	Pati Marr	Susan Calman, Radzi Chinyanganya, Dan Antopolski and Chris Martin	Sonia and Harley (2)	21 February 2014
Winners: Harley (2)'s team of Dan and Chris
6	6	"Episode Six"	Pati Marr	Katie Mulgrew, Bobby Lockwood, Paul McCaffrey and Louisa Connolly-Burnham	Gilbert (1) and Neve (1)	28 February 2014
Winners: Gilbert (1)'s team of Katie and Bobby
7	7	"Episode Seven"	Pati Marr	Susan Calman, Ore Oduba, Des Clarke and Dodge T. Dog	Jude (1) and Sonia (2)	7 March 2014
Winners: Jude (1)'s team of Susan and Ore
8	8	"Episode Eight"	Pati Marr	Romesh Ranganathan, Kirstie Steele, Bec Hill and Shane O'Meara	Gilbert (2) and Neve (2)	14 March 2014
Winners: Neve (2)'s team of Bec and Shane
9	9	"Episode Nine"	Pati Marr	Chris Martin, Ashleigh Butler, Susan Calman and Cel Spellman	Jude (2) and Lucy	21 March 2014
Winners: Lucy's team of Susan and Cel
10	10	"Episode Ten"	Pati Marr	Romesh Ranganathan, Victoria Cook, Bec Hill and Joel Dommett	Jamie (2) and Roma (2)	28 March 2014
Winners: Jamie (2)'s team of Romesh and Victoria

=== Series 2 (2015) ===
No. overall	No. in series	Title	Directed by	Celebrity panelists	Child panelists	Original release date
11	1	"Episode 1"	Pati Marr	Joe Swash, Ashleigh Butler, Alex Riley and Romesh Ranganathan	TBA	23 January 2015
12	2	"Episode 2"	Pati Marr	Hacker T. Dog, Michelle Ackerley, Johnny Cochrane and Inel Tomlinson	TBA	30 January 2015
13	3	"Episode 3"	Pati Marr	Dodge T. Dog, Naomi Wilkinson, Sam Nixon and Mark Rhodes	TBA	6 February 2015
14	4	"Episode 4"	Pati Marr	Jermain Jackman, Bobby Lockwood, Katherine Ryan and Nihal Arthanayake	TBA	20 February 2015
15	5	"Episode 5"	Pati Marr	Dominique Moore, Aidan Davis, Alex Riley and Susan Calman	TBA	27 February 2015
16	6	"Episode 6"	Pati Marr	Sam Nixon and Mark Rhodes, Dodge T. Dog and Dominique Moore	TBA	6 March 2015
17	7	"Episode 7"	Pati Marr	Sam Strike, Percelle Ascott, Dan Wright and Susan Calman	TBA	13 March 2015
18	8	"Episode 8"	Pati Marr	Chris Stark, Ashleigh Butler, James Acaster and Romesh Ranganathan	TBA	20 March 2015
19	9	"Episode 9"	Pati Marr	Jack Carroll, Bobby Lockwood, Lloyd Langford and Pippa Evans	TBA	27 March 2015
20	10	"Episode 10"	Pati Marr	Dominique Moore, Aidan Davis, Alex Riley and Susan Calman	TBA	3 April 2015
21	11	"Compilation Show"	Pati Marr	TBA	TBA	17 April 2015
In this special episode, Iain Stirling takes on the role of Stirling Holmes. As the world's greatest detective, he is trying to solve the strange case of the missing homework... which has been stolen by evil genius Professor Dogiarty.

=== Christmas Special (2015) ===
No. overall	No. in series	Title	Directed by	Celebrity panelists	Child panelists	Original release date
22	1	"Christmas Special"	Pati Marr	Hacker T. Dog, Ashleigh Butler, Alex Riley and Pippa Evans	TBA	16 December 2015

=== Series 3 (2016) ===
No. overall	No. in series	Title	Directed by	Celebrity panelists	Child panelists	Original release date
23	1	"Episode 1"	Pati Marr	Johnny Cochrane and Inel Tomlinson, Chris Johnson and Susan Calman	TBA	8 January 2016
24	2	"Episode 2"	Pati Marr	Romesh Ranganathan, Lucy Connell, Lydia Connell, Naomi Wilkinson and Dan Wright	TBA	15 January 2016
25	3	"Episode 3"	Pati Marr	Chris Johnson, Dominique Moore, Ed Petrie and Alex Riley	TBA	22 January 2016
26	4	"Episode 4"	Pati Marr	Dominique Moore, Stuart Goldsmith, Chris Johnson and Susan Calman	TBA	5 February 2016
27	5	"Episode 5"	Pati Marr	Bec Hill, Victoria Cook, Chris Martin and Charlie Baker	TBA	12 February 2016
28	6	"Episode 6"	Pati Marr	Lauren Layfield, Joe Swash, Dan Wright and James Acaster	TBA	19 February 2016
29	7	"Episode 7"	Pati Marr	Ed Petrie, Alex Riley, Shazia Mirza and Dodge T. Dog	TBA	26 February 2016
30	8	"Episode 8"	Pati Marr	Victoria Cook, Lauren Layfield, Phil Wang and Mawaan Rizwan	TBA	4 March 2016
31	9	"Episode 9"	Pati Marr	Radzi Chinyanganya, Ellie Taylor, Suzi Ruffell and Ricky Martin	TBA	11 March 2016
32	10	"Episode 10"	Pati Marr	Bobby Lockwood, Grace Mandeville, Matthew Crosby and Tom Craine	TBA	18 March 2016
33	11	"Episode 11"	Pati Marr	Sam Fletcher, Grace Mandeville, Tom Craine and Dan Antopolski	TBA	25 March 2016
34	12	"Episode 12"	Pati Marr	Ellie Taylor, Marlon Davis, Sam Fletcher and Mawaan Rizwan	TBA	26 March 2016
35	13	"Episode 13"	Pati Marr	Bobby Lockwood, Fran Scott, Naomi Wilkinson and Dodge T. Dog	TBA	27 March 2016
36	14	"Episode 14"	Pati Marr	Hacker T. Dog, Susan Calman, Steve Bugeja and Ben Shires	TBA	28 March 2016

=== Series 4 (2016–2017) ===
No. overall	No. in series	Title	Directed by	Celebrity panelists	Child panelists	Original release date
37	1	"Episode 1"	Pati Marr	Matthew Crosby, Lauren Layfield, Dominique Moore and Saima Chowdhury	TBA	4 November 2016
38	2	"Episode 2"	Pati Marr	Sam Nixon, Mark Rhodes, Dodge T. Dog and Sam Battersea	TBA	11 November 2016
39	3	"Episode 3"	Pati Marr	Johnny Cochrane, Inel Tomlinson, Phil Wang and Jess Robinson	TBA	18 November 2016
40	4	"Episode 4"	Pati Marr	Ben Shires, Suzi Ruffell, Stuart Goldsmith and Bec Hill	TBA	25 November 2016
41	5	"Episode 5"	Pati Marr	Susan Calman, Dodge T. Dog, Chris Johnson and Leo Waddell	TBA	2 December 2016
42	6	"Episode 6"	Pati Marr	Johnny Cochrane, Inel Tomlinson, Steve Bugeja and Katia Kvinge	TBA	9 December 2016
43	7	"Episode 7"	Pati Marr	Lauren Layfield, Matthew Crosby, Dan Wright and Marlon Davis	TBA	13 January 2017
44	8	"Episode 8"	Pati Marr	Katie Thistleton, Stuart Goldsmith, Ivo Graham and Suzi Ruffell	TBA	20 January 2017
45	9	"Episode 9"	Pati Marr	Hacker T. Dog, Ellie Taylor, Ricky Martin and Radzi Chinyanganya	TBA	27 January 2017
46	10	"Episode 10"	Pati Marr	Chris Johnson, Tom Allen, Dominique Moore and Luke Kempner	TBA	3 February 2017
47	11	"Episode 11: Sports Day Special"	Pati Marr	Ed Petrie, Naomi Wilkinson, Tom Craine and Richard David-Caine	TBA	10 February 2017
48	12	"Episode 12"	Pati Marr	Ellie Taylor, Marlon Davis, Hacker T. Dog and Gareth Richards	TBA	17 February 2017
49	13	"Episode 13"	Pati Marr	Saima Chowdhury, Ahir Shah, Charlie Baker and Rory Crawford	TBA	24 February 2017

=== Series 5 (2018) ===
No. overall	No. in series	Title	Directed by	Celebrity panelists	Child panelists	Original release date
50	1	"Episode 1"	Pati Marr	Johnny Cochrane, Inel Tomlinson, Charlie Baker and Suzi Ruffell	TBA	5 January 2018
51	2	"Episode 2"	Pati Marr	Matthew Crosby, Saima Chowdhury, Jess Robinson and Lauren Layfield	TBA	12 January 2018
52	3	"Episode 3"	Pati Marr	Sam Nixon, Mark Rhodes, Yuriko Kotani and Charlie Baker	TBA	19 January 2018
53	4	"Episode 4"	Pati Marr	Dominique Moore, Lou Sanders, George Lewis and Jarred Christmas	TBA	26 January 2018
54	5	"Episode 5"	Pati Marr	Steve Bugeja, Tom Allen, Martin Dougan and Athena Kugblenu	TBA	2 February 2018
55	6	"Episode 6"	Pati Marr	Ben Shires, Dominique Moore, Victoria Cook and Gareth Richards	TBA	9 February 2018
56	7	"Episode 7"	Pati Marr	Sam Nixon, Mark Rhodes, Suzi Ruffell and Ray Bradshaw	TBA	16 February 2018
57	8	"Episode 8"	Pati Marr	Jack Carroll, Naomi Wilkinson, Bec Hill and Tez Ilyas	TBA	23 February 2018
58	9	"Episode 9"	Pati Marr	TBA	TBA	2 March 2018
59	10	"Episode 10"	Pati Marr	TBA	TBA	9 March 2018
60	11	"Episode 11"	Pati Marr	TBA	TBA	16 March 2018
61	12	"Episode 12"	Pati Marr	TBA	TBA	23 March 2018

=== Series 6 (2019) ===
No. overall	No. in series	Title	Directed by	Celebrity panelists	Child panelists	Original release date
62	1	"Episode 1"	Pati Marr	TBA	TBA	3 February 2019
63	2	"Episode 2"	Pati Marr	TBA	TBA	10 February 2019
64	3	"Episode 3"	Pati Marr	TBA	TBA	17 February 2019
65	4	"Episode 4"	Pati Marr	TBA	TBA	24 February 2019
66	5	"Episode 5"	Pati Marr	TBA	TBA	3 March 2019
67	6	"Episode 6"	Pati Marr	TBA	TBA	10 March 2019
68	7	"Episode 7"	Pati Marr	TBA	TBA	17 March 2019
69	8	"Episode 8"	Pati Marr	TBA	TBA	24 March 2019
70	9	"Episode 9"	Pati Marr	TBA	TBA	31 March 2019
71	10	"Episode 10"	Pati Marr	TBA	TBA	7 April 2019
72	11	"Episode 11"	Pati Marr	TBA	TBA	14 April 2019
73	12	"Episode 12"	Pati Marr	TBA	TBA	21 April 2019

=== Series 7 (2019–2020) ===
No. overall	No. in series	Title	Directed by	Celebrity panelists	Child panelists	Original release date
74	1	"Episode 1"	Pati Marr	Dr Ranj Singh, Bec Hill, Jarred Christmas and Rosie Jones	Slyvie and Hakeem	24 November 2019
75	2	"Episode 2"	Pati Marr	TBA	TBA	1 December 2019
76	3	"Episode 3"	Pati Marr	TBA	TBA	8 December 2019
77	4	"Episode 4"	Pati Marr	TBA	TBA	15 December 2019
78	5	"Episode 5"	Pati Marr	TBA	TBA	22 December 2019
79	6	"Episode 6"	Pati Marr	TBA	TBA	5 January 2020
80	7	"Episode 7"	Pati Marr	Ed Petrie, Vic Cook, Sarah Keyworth and Joe Tasker	TBA	12 January 2020
81	8	"Episode 8"	Pati Marr	TBA	TBA	19 January 2020
82	9	"Episode 9"	Pati Marr	TBA	TBA	26 January 2020
83	10	"Episode 10"	Pati Marr	Ed Petrie, Vic Cook, Sarah Keyworth and Joe Tasker	TBA	2 February 2020
84	11	"Episode 11"	Pati Marr	TBA	TBA	9 February 2020
85	12	"Episode 12"	Pati Marr	TBA	TBA	16 February 2020

=== Christmas Special (2020) ===
No. overall	No. in series	Title	Directed by	Celebrity panelists	Child panelists	Original release date
86	1	"Christmas Special"	Pati Marr	TBA	TBA	10 December 2020

=== Series 8 (2020–2021) ===
No. overall	No. in series	Title	Directed by	Celebrity panelists	Child panelists	Original release date
87	2	"Episode 1"	Pati Marr	TBA	TBA	10 December 2020
88	3	"Episode 2"	Unknown	TBA	TBA	10 January 2021
89	4	"Episode 3"	Unknown	TBA	TBA	17 January 2021
90	5	"Episode 4"	Unknown	TBA	TBA	24 January 2021
91	6	"Episode 5"	TBA	TBA	TBA	TBA
92	7	"Episode 6"	TBA	Ed Petrie, Vic Cook, Sarah Keyworth and Joe Tasker	TBA	TBA
93	8	"Episode 7"	TBA	TBA	TBA	TBA
94	9	"Episode 8"	TBA	TBA	TBA	TBA
95	10	"Episode 9"	TBA	Ed Petrie, Vic Cook, Sarah Keyworth and Joe Tasker	TBA	TBA
96	11	"Episode 10"	TBA	TBA	TBA	TBA
97	12	"Episode 11"	TBA	TBA	TBA	TBA

== Guest appearances ==
The following have all appeared multiple times as one of the guest panelists on the show.

11 appearances

- Susan Calman

9 appearances

- Dominique Moore

7 appearances

- Dodge T. Dog

6 appearances

- Victoria Cook
- Bec Hill
- Lauren Layfield
- Sam Nixon
- Romesh Ranganathan
- Alex Riley
- Mark Rhodes

5 appearances

- Charlie Baker
- Ashleigh Butler
- Johnny Cochrane
- Bobby Lockwood
- Chris Johnson
- Suzi Ruffell
- Hacker T. Dog
- Inel Tomlinson
- Naomi Wilkinson
- Dan Wright

4 appearances

- Matthew Crosby
- Ellie Taylor

3 appearances

- Steve Bugeja
- Jack Carroll
- Radzi Chinyanganya
- Tom Craine
- Marlon Davis
- Sam Fletcher
- Stuart Goldsmith
- Chris Martin
- Paul McCaffrey
- Ed Petrie
- Mawaan Rizwan
- Ben Shires

2 appearances

- James Acaster
- Tom Allen
- Dan Antopolski
- Aidan Davis
- Pippa Evans
- Ivo Graham
- Luke Kempner
- Grace Mandeville
- Ricky Martin
- Katie Mulgrew
- Gareth Richards
- Jess Robinson
- Joe Swash
- Phil Wang

Susan Calman, Dan Wright and Dodge T. Dog are the only panelists to have featured in every series. However, none of them featured in the stand-alone Christmas special. As of April 2019, Calman has not appeared in an episode of the show since Season 4.

The following have all made a single appearance as one of the guest panellists on the show:

- Michelle Ackerley
- Nihal Arthanayake
- Percelle Ascott
- Sam Battersea
- Ray Bradshaw
- Jarred Christmas
- Des Clarke
- Louisa Connolly-Burnham
- Rory Crawford
- Richard David-Caine
- Joel Dommett
- Martin Dougan
- JB Gill
- Storm Huntley
- Tez Ilyas
- Jermaine Jackman
- Yuriko Kotani
- Athena Kugblenu
- Katia Kvinge
- Lloyd Langford
- George Lewis
- Lucy & Lydia
- Shazia Mirza
- Oyiza Momoh
- Ore Oduba
- Shane O'Meara
- Funmbi Omotayo
- Katherine Ryan
- Lou Sanders
- Fran Scott
- Ahir Shah
- Ranj Singh
- Cel Spellman
- Chris Stark
- Kirstie Steele
- Sam Strike
- Katie Thistleton
- Leo Waddell
