= Carl Donnelly =

English stand-up, comedian & writer (born 1982)

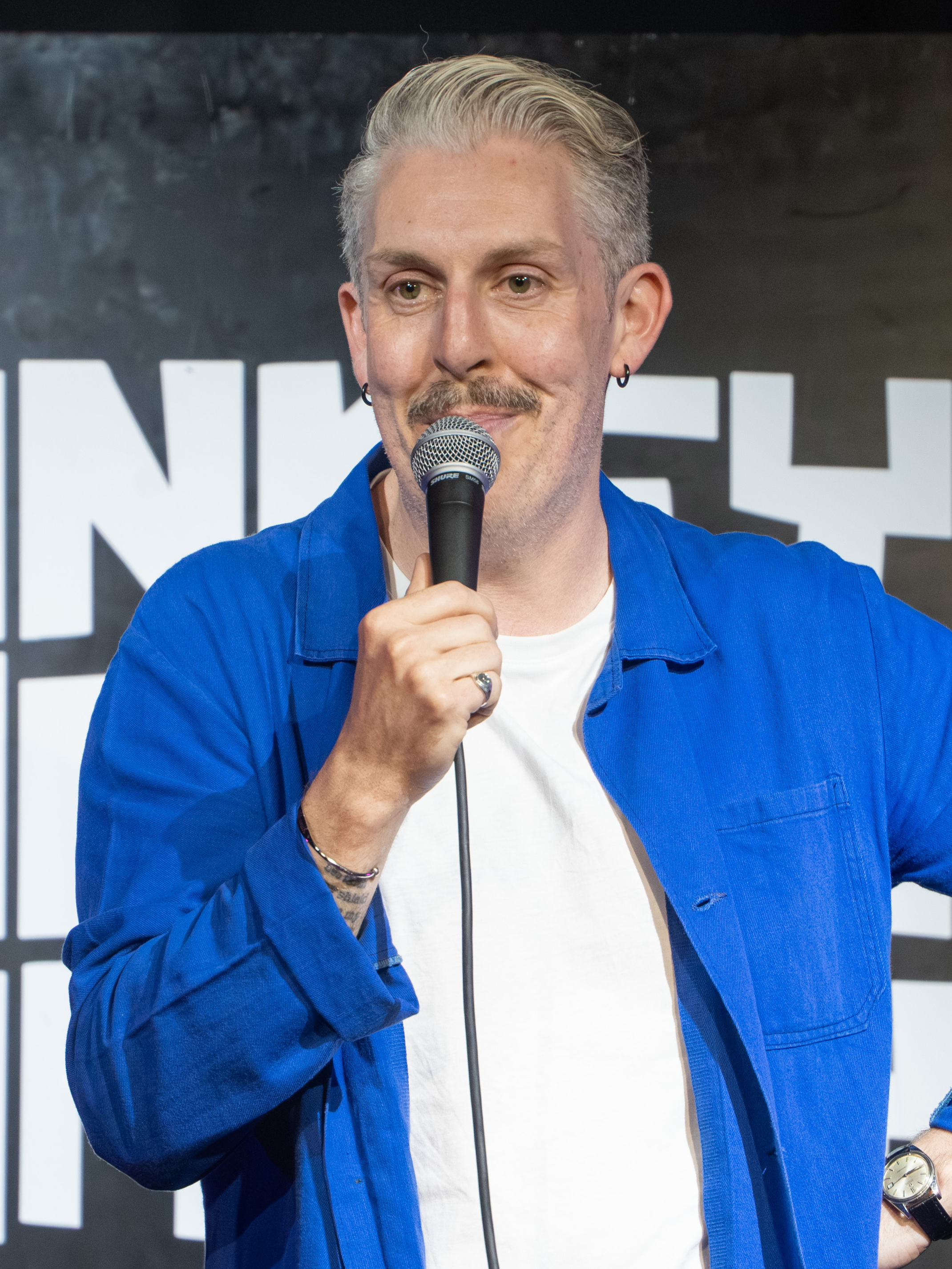
- Donnelly at the Edinburgh Festival Fringe in 2025
- Born: Carl Donnelly; 13 January 1982 (age 44); Tooting, London, England

Comedy career
- Years active: 2004–present
- Medium: Stand-up, radio, podcast
- Genre: Observational
- Website: www.carldonnelly.info

Carl Donnelly (born 13 January 1982 in Tooting, south London) is an English stand-up, dancer, comedian, and writer. He has performed 11 solo shows at the Edinburgh Festival, being nominated for the Edinburgh Comedy Awards twice - once for best newcomer, and once for best show. He became a vegan in 2013, and has since become an ambassador for Veganuary. He has talked about being vegan extensively in his act.

== Stand-up career ==
Donnelly has appeared on radio in BBC Radio 4's 28 Acts in 28 Minutes, LBC's Comedy Cabaret, Fighting Talk on BBC Radio 5 Live and Tim Shaw's The Asylum on Kerrang! Radio. He has appeared on TV in Mock the Week, Russell Howard's Good News, Stand Up Central, and Alan Davies: As Yet Untitled.

== Podcasts ==
Donnelly hosted The Carl Donnelly And Chris Martin Comedy Podcast alongside comedian Chris Martin from 2008 to 2018. It was featured in a Guardian list of the top 10 comedy podcasts in 2010. They also hosted a spin-off, Babysitting Trevor, along with Trevor Cook.

In 2020, he started hosting The Keith Cheggars Podcast, about his upcoming child with his then pregnant wife, Hannah Norris. He also started a podcast where he drank coffee and had a chat, called A Comedian Called Carl Drinking Coffee.

Carl now co-hosts TVI with Carl Donnelly and Julian Deane.

== Personal life ==
Carl was previously married in his 20s, writing about his divorce in his act. He is a supporter of Tottenham Hotspur football club. He has since remarried, with his 2nd wife, Hannah Norris, giving birth to their child in 2020.

== Awards ==
- Laughing Horse New Act of the Year 2006
- Chortle Awards Best Newcomer 2007
- Leicester Mercury Comedian of the Year 2007
- Edinburgh Comedy Awards Best Newcomer Nominee 2009
- Edinburgh Comedy Awards Best Show Nominee 2013
- Chortle Awards Best Club Comedian 2017

== Edinburgh Fringe shows ==
- Relax Everyone, It's Carl Donnelly! (2009)
- How Do You Solve A Problem Like Carl Donnelly? (2010)
- Carl Donnelly 3: Carl Donnelier! (2011)
- Carl Donnelly: Different Gravy (2012)
- Now That's What I Carl Donnelly! Volume V (2013)
- Now That's What I Carl Donnelly Vol. 6 (2014)
- Carl Donnelly: Jive Ass Honky (2015)
- Carl Donnelly: Bad Man Tings (2016)
- Carl Donnelly: The Nutter on the Bus (2017)
- Strictly Carl Donnelly! (2018)
- Carl Donnelly: Shall We All Just Kill Ourselves? (2019)
- Carl Donnelly: The Dead Dad Show (2023)
- Carl Donnelly: Boosegumps (2024)
- Carl Donnelly: Another Round (2025)
