= Luisa Omielan =

British comedian based in Birmingham

- Born: 7 September 1982 (age 44); Birmingham, England, U.K.
- Education: Salford University
- Employer: BBC
- Notable work: "What Would Beyoncé Do?!", "Am I Right Ladies", "Politics for Bitches", "God Is a Woman", "Ten"
- Website: luisaomielan.com

Luisa Omielan (born 7 September 1982) is a British comedian based in Birmingham.

== Early life ==
Born in Birmingham to parents of Polish descent, she is the middle of five children. Luisa lived in Farnborough, Hampshire where she went to St Patricks Catholic School and then onto a Catholic secondary school in Farnham called All Hallows. In 2005, she graduated from Salford University with a first class BA Hons in Performing Arts. In 2011 Luisa attended training at Second City in Chicago where she specialised in Clowning, Improvisation and Sketch Writing.

== Career ==
Omielan first started stand up comedy in 2008 performing at the Brighton Fringe Festival. In 2012, Omielan performed her debut stand up solo show, What Would Beyoncé Do?! as part of the Brighton Fringe, later followed by the free fringe at the Edinburgh Festival. What Would Beyoncé Do?! has since had ten sell out runs at London's Soho Theatre. Omielan was later nominated at Melbourne International Comedy Festival for best Comedy show. The show went on to tour 12 countries and recorded as a BBC special. It was named “one of the biggest stand up hits of the decade’ by The Guardian.

In 2014, Omielan was invited to perform for ten nights as part of the Montreal Just for Laughs Festival. The show then continued to have a week run in the London West End at the Leicester Square Theatre. Omielan is known for her empowering 'party' atmosphere genre of comedy. Her follow-up show Am I Right Ladies?! has had a UK tour, received critical acclaim and five star reviews. In July 2015, Omielan used crowd funding website Indiegogo to self fund a DVD recording of Am I Right Ladies?! at the Bloomsbury Theatre, which she later uploaded to her YouTube channel, in February 2018.

On 20 November 2014, she appeared on the 99th episode of The Comedian's Comedian Podcast with Stuart Goldsmith.

In 2015, she toured Australia and performed as part of the Comedy Gala. A 4-minute clip where Omielan discuses the 'thigh gap' went viral and has since amassed over 43 million views on Facebook.

In 2017 the BBC produced a TV version of her What Would Beyoncé Do?! show, shown as a special on BBC Three, and later on BBC One.

In 2018 Luisa was named a Bafta Breakthrough Brit, she is the first comedian to ever be nominated and supported by the scheme.

Autumn 2018 she adapted her live Edinburgh Fringe stage show, Politics for Bitches, into six 30 minute episodes for the BBC. Via a part documentary, part stand-up gig format, Omielan explores a few of the socioeconomic and political issues facing young adults in the UK today.

She appeared as a panelist in Series 22, Episodes 1 and 4, of the Radio 4 show The Unbelievable Truth. Following her mother's death from bowel cancer, Omielan launched Helena's Hospice Foundation.

She currently lives in Birmingham and is supported on tour with her dog Bernie, a Bernese mountain dog.

== Television appearances ==
- Miranda (Christmas Special, 2014)
- The John Bishop Show (June 2015)
- Alan Davies: As Yet Untitled (2016)
- Red Nose Day (2017) (co-presenter
- Drunk history UK (sometime in 2017)
- What Would Beyoncé Do?! (BBC special, 2017)
- Live at the Apollo (December 2017)
- Stand Up Central (October 2018)
- Politics for Bitches (Six part BBC TV series, October 2018)
- Comedy Central Live (June 2019)

== Books ==
On 14 July 2016, Omielan's book What Would Beyonce Do?! was published by Century. ISBN 9781780894454.
