= Chris Martin (comedian) =

English comedian

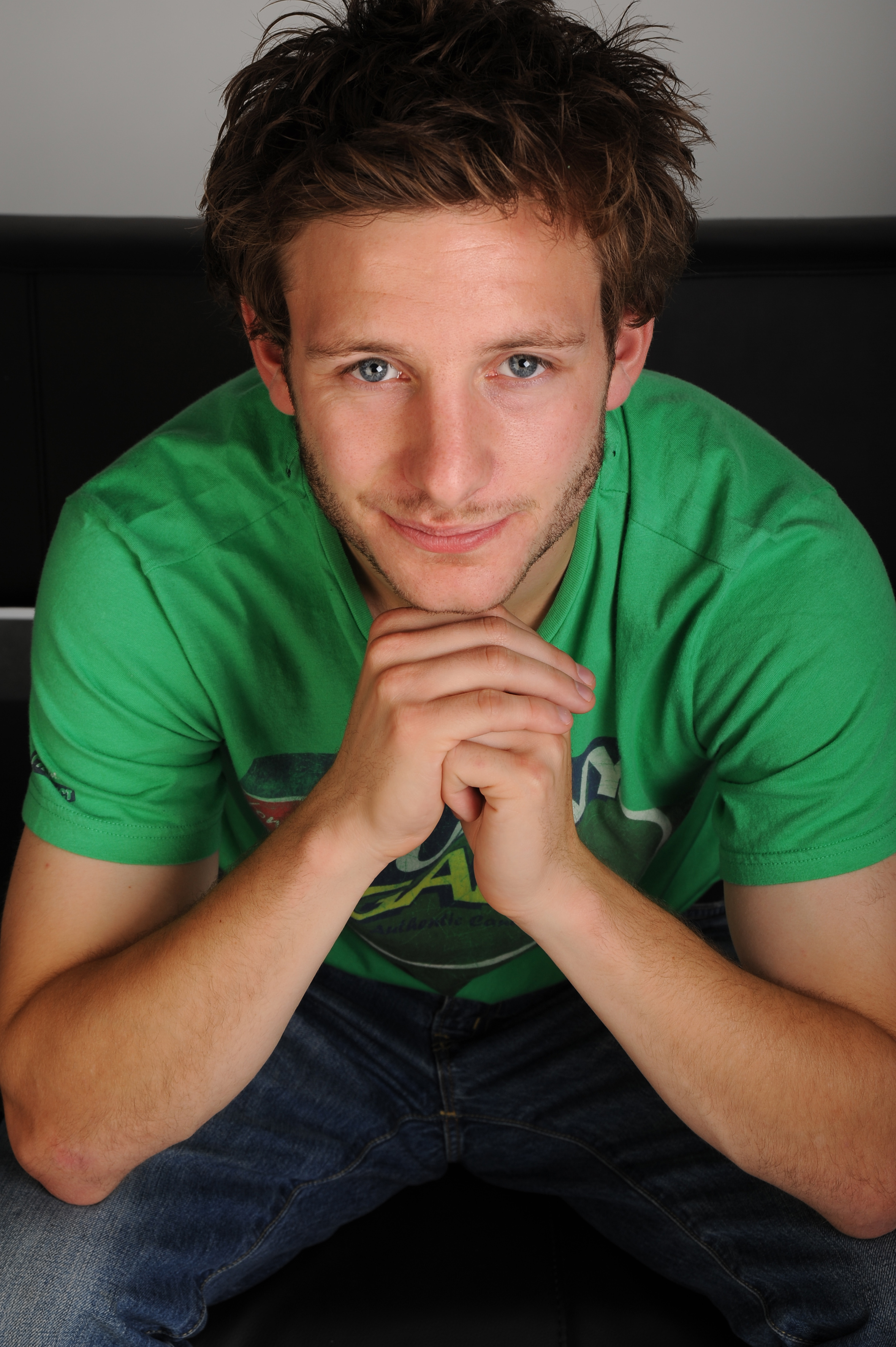
- Born: Chris Martin; 8 June 1986 (age 40); London, England

Comedy career
- Years active: 2005–present
- Medium: Stand-up, radio
- Website: www.chrismartincomedy.co.uk

Chris Martin (born 8 June 1986 in London) is an English stand-up comedian and writer. He currently lives and works in America with his wife, writing on The Late Late Show.

== Stand-up career ==
Martin began his comedy career in 2005. After reaching the finals of both Chortle Student Comedian of the Year and Amused Moose Laugh off competitions Martin went on to appear in a series of Edinburgh shows, including AAA at The Pleasance Courtyard. In 2011, Martin debuted his solo show Chris Martin. No. Not That One, which sold out its entire run and received a string of 4 star reviews. He released his debut album All Over the Place in February 2022.

== Live shows ==
- Chris Martin: The One and Only Chris Martin (2017) Edinburgh Fringe
- Chris Martin: This Show has a Soundtrack (2015) Edinburgh Fringe
- Chris Martin: Responsibilliness (2014) Edinburgh Fringe
- Chris Martin: Passionate About the Pointless (2013) Edinburgh Fringe
- Milton Jones National Tour - Support Artist National venues (2013)
- Chris Martin - Spot The Difference (2012) Edinburgh Fringe
- Chris Martin - No. Not That One (2011) Edinburgh Fringe
- Zoe Lyons National Tour – Support Artist National venues (2010)
- Al Pitcher National Tour – Support Artist National venues (2009)
- Part of AAA Stand-Up Pleasance Courtyard (2009)
- Pete Firman National Tour – Support Artist National venues (2008)
- Freestyle Comedy Edinburgh Festival (2008)
- Three Comedians for the Price of None Edinburgh Festival (2007)
- The Good, The Bad and The Cuddly Edinburgh Festival (2006)

== TV and radio ==
- Horrible Science on CITV (2015)
- The Dog Ate My Homework on CBBC (2014; 16)
- Two Pints of Lager and a Packet of Crisps (Warm Up) on BBC3 (2011)
- Greatest Christmas Adverts on Channel 5 Objective (2010)
- Great TV Christmas Moments on Channel 5 Objective (2010)
- The Most Annoying People of 2010 on BBC 3 Shine (2010)
- "For What It's Worth" (Warm-up) Pilot Zeppotron (2010)
- "World Cup's Most Shocking Moments" BBC 3 Zig Zag (2010)
- Matt Forde's TalkSport (2010)
- Hawksbee & Jacobs on BBC Radio 5 Live (2010)
- The Most Annoying People of 2009 (2009)
- Greatest Ever 3-D Moments on Channel 4 Objective (2009)
- Chris Martin & Carl Donnelly Bitesize Podcast on iTunes (4 episodes) (2008)
- Meet the Blogs Writer/Performer Babycow (2006)

== Podcasts ==
Martin hosted The Carl Donnelly And Chris Martin Comedy Podcast alongside comedian Carl Donnelly from 2008 to 2018.

In 2021, he launched his own podcast, Getting My Dad to Say I Love You.

== Achievements ==
- Guardian Top Ten Comedy Podcast 2010
- Amused Moose Laugh-Off Finalist 2007
- Chortle Student Comedian of the Year Runner-up 2006
