= Aidan Davis =

- Born: 23 March 1997 (age 29)
- Origin: Birmingham, England
- Genres: Dancer, rapper, presenter
- Occupations: Streetdancer, popper, television presenter, Rapper
- Years active: 2009 – present

Aidan Davis (born 23 March 1997) is an English street dancer, rapper, and television host. In 2009, he reached the final of the third series of the ITV talent show Britain's Got Talent. He finished fifth place overall and later that year he toured the United Kingdom, making live performances with the series' other finalists.

Davis has made numerous performances since Britain's Got Talent, including the 'Diversitoys' tour with Diversity, and as a presenter on the Friday Download show on CBBC. In 2012 Aidan made his first music video, "Let's Dance", which featured Jon Dos.

== History ==
=== Britain's Got Talent: 2009 ===
In May 2009, Davis auditioned for the third series of the ITV television talent show Britain's Got Talent. In his audition he performed to Flo Rida's "Low". He received positive comments from all three judges, with Simon Cowell saying "I think you're better than any dancer on this show, you are super, super, super talented". He received three yesses from Cowell, Amanda Holden and Piers Morgan and was put through to the next round. Despite never having had a dance lesson, at the time Davis was compared to the series 2 winner George Sampson and was later chosen as one of the 40 semi-finalists.

He performed for a second time in the semi-final on 29 May 2009, dancing to "Rock Your Body" by Justin Timberlake. Again he received a standing ovation from the audience and positive comments from the judges. Amanda Holden said that Davis "blew her away" and he "went through the roof." Cowell told him, "whatever 'it' is, you've got it." He also praised Davis' confidence and charisma. Morgan compared him to a young Justin Timberlake, declaring him "a delight to watch". He was automatically put through to the final after receiving the highest public vote.

In the final,(30 May 2009)he again performed to Flo Rida's "Low", which was his audition piece. He received a standing ovation. Amanda Holden and Piers Morgan loved the performance. Simon Cowell, however, told him his performance was not as good as his performance the previous night in the semi-final. He told him: "To be honest with you it wasn't as good. You had 24 hours and limited time to put it together. But you still have a huge future ahead of you" Davis later said that he felt "gutted" by this, but Cowell urged "Don't listen to me – no one else does. There's the public vote".

He did not rank in the top three acts in the competition, finishing overall in fifth place, receiving 6.5% of the total 4 million votes cast. After the show, Simon Cowell spoke of his regret at making Davis cry during the final.

=== Post Britain's Got Talent ===
Davis performed in the Britain's Got Talent – The Live Tour 2009 in June and July 2009 at venues all over the UK along with the other finalists from the show. It was reported that Davis was going to team up with series 3 winners Diversity; although they did perform together on the tour, Davis never officially became a member of Diversity.

Davis performed at a Michael Jackson dance tribute show on 30 August 2009. He was lined up with other dance stars from Britain's Got Talent, including George Sampson, Diversity and Signature at the Opera House Theatre in Blackpool Winter Gardens. Acts that also appeared were MD Productions, from the first series of Britain's Got Talent, Flava, Sugar Free and Marcquelle Ward who plays BB from television show Britannia High.

On 24 September 2009, Davis performed at the launch night of Birmingham's Style in the City event. He showed off some of his "popping" moves at the event, hosted by Mr Hudson. The following month, Davis filmed an advert for Cheetos Sweetos in Turkey.

Davis joined Peter Andre, Alesha Dixon, Alan Carr, Lenny Henry and the Sugababes for the 2009 Rock with Laughter event which took place on 18 & 19 December 2009 at the LG Arena. Lenny Henry, host of the event, spoke highly of Davis:

Aidan's appearances on Britain's Got Talent were extraordinary! That someone so young could be so funky, bendy and groovy whilst also doing sums, and pulling girls' pig tails at school is incredible. He is our own Justin Timberlake. I'm so pleased he's going to be making an appearance on Rock with Laughter – and I'm sure the audience's cheers will ring to the rafters when he rocks his body.

=== 2010 ===
Davis toured with Talent winners Diversity in Spring 2010. The tour was named "Bringing a Toy Story to Life" Plus Many Special Guest's, which specialises in 'bringing toys to life'. The tour also features Talent semi – finalists Sugar Free, rap artist Aggro Santos, Contortionist Delia Du Sol, and Beatboxer Petebox. He performed at the Christmas lights switch on in St Helens, Merseyside on 14 November. Davis performed at the Northfield Shopping Centre on 5 December, and on 8 December, he performed at the Pavilions Shopping Centre which was featured on Central Tonight. On 1 August 2010, Davis performed at Nantwich live festival alongside many other acts. He also toured with Diversity again in November/ December 2010 in the second run of their Diversitoys tour, this time titled Diversitoys; bringing a toy story to life at Christmas

=== 2011–2013 ===
Davis presents on the CBBC program called 'Friday Download' where in a section, he teaches the audience some of his signature dance moves 'Dance Download'. Other presenters are singer Dionne Bromfield and actors Cel Spellman, Richard Wisker and Shannon Flynn.

In 2011, Davis began posting weekly video updates on his Facebook page every Sunday to keep his fans informed. He answers questions and talks about topics his fans want to know about during these videos, and he also gives shoutouts to fans who ask.

In November 2012 Davis released his first music video for his new song, "Lets Dance" featuring Jon Dos. In the song Davis raps. He said in a recent update video "There's more like that to come." His message to his fans (Aidanator's) "love you like breathing – I can't stop"

=== 2015 ===
In 2015, Davis appeared as a panelist in two episodes of the CBBC panel show The Dog Ate My Homework.

== Personal life ==
Davis attended St Thomas Aquinas Catholic School, Kings Norton, Birmingham. He lived in Selly Oak, Birmingham with his parents. He released a self written and produced EP called 'the party' to iTunes on 23 March 2015.
