= Sindhu Vee =

Indian-born British comedian and actress

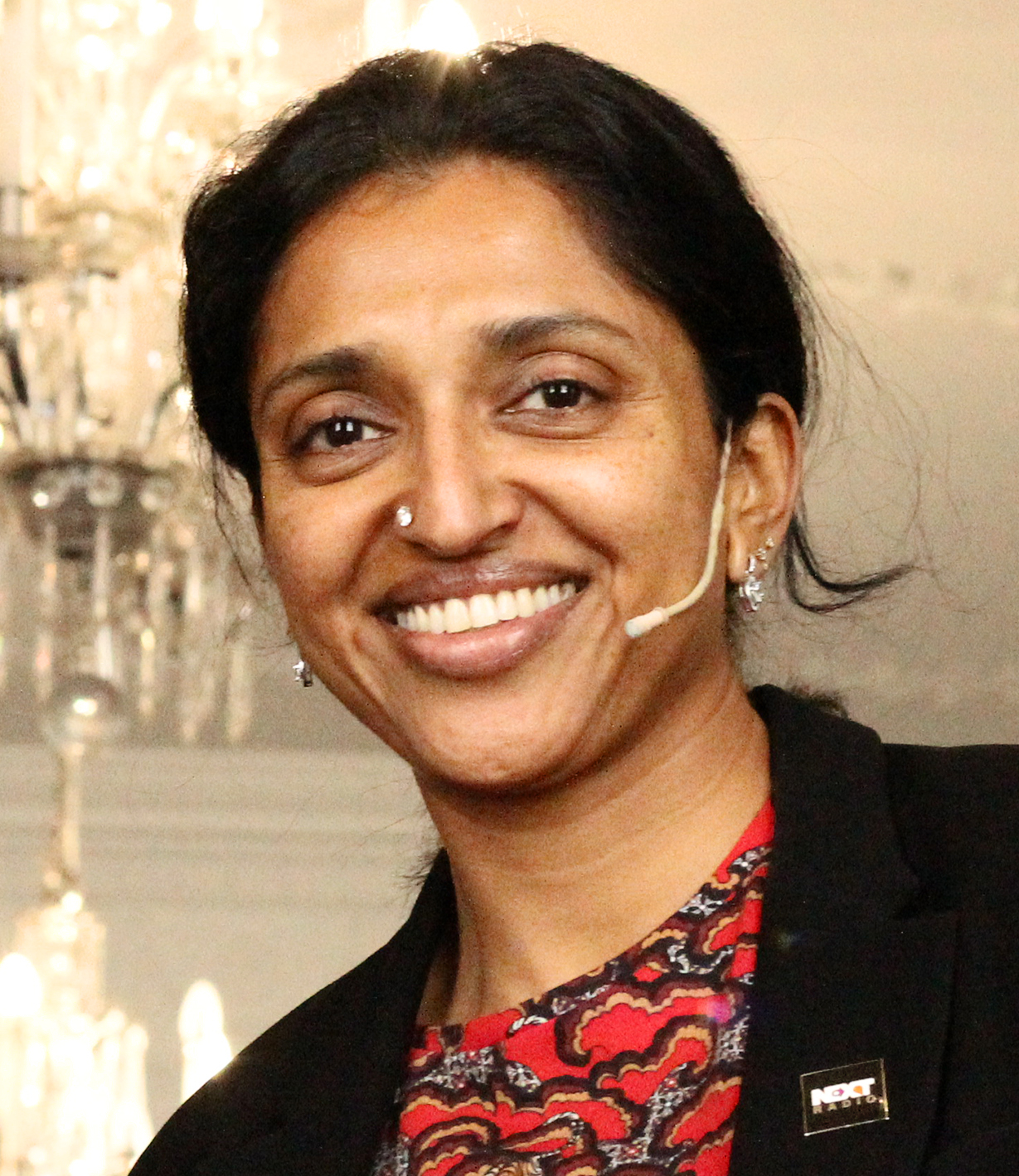
- Sindhu Vee in 2017
- Born: Sindhu Venkatanarayanan; 19 June 1969 (age 57); New Delhi, India
- Education: University of Delhi (BA); University of Oxford (BA); McGill University (MA); University of Chicago (MPP)
- Occupations: Actress; Comedian
- Years active: 2012–present
- Known for: Matilda the Musical (2022)
- Children: 3
- Website: sindhuvee.com

Sindhu Venkatanarayanan (born 19 June 1969), better known as Sindhu Vee, is an Indian-born British comedian and actress. She is best known for starring in the 2022 fantasy musical film Matilda the Musical as Mrs. Phelps, as well as her appearances on the comedy panel show QI.

== Early life ==
Sindhu was born in New Delhi, India as the daughter of a civil servant Tamil father and a teacher mother, from Uttar Pradesh. She has lived in Delhi, Lucknow and the Philippines. She studied at the University of Delhi, the University of Oxford, the University of Chicago and McGill University and worked in banking as a "high-flying bonds tradeswoman" in London, England.

== Career ==
Sindhu started performing stand-up comedy in 2012 and has performed on stage in the United Kingdom, India and the United States. She appeared at the Edinburgh Festival Fringe each year between 2013 and 2017. Sindhu was nominated for the BBC New Comedy Award in 2016 and was second at the Leicester Mercury Comedian of the Year in 2017 and third at the NATYS: New Acts of the Year Show in the same year.

== Personal life ==
Sindhu now lives in London, England with her Danish financier husband and their three children.

== Filmography ==
=== Actress ===
Year	Title	Role(s)	Note(s)
2018	Sick of It	Chemist's Wife	TV series 1 episode only
2018	Sky Comedy: Sindhu Vee's Live and Let Love	Pretty/Mummy	TV miniseries
2018	Say My Name	Detective Raj	Movie
2018	EastEnders: The Podcast	Unknown role (voice)	Podcast series 1 episode only
2018	Bounty	Shazia	TV movie
2020	Sex Education	Olivia's Mum	TV series 2 episodes only
2020	Feel Good	Karen	TV series 5 episodes only
2020	Sheltered	Lady Reaver	Podcast series
2021	The Importance of Being Earnest	Libby	Stage play
2021	Starstruck	Sindhu	TV series 3 episodes only
2022	What's Love Got to Do with It?	Fertility Doctor	Movies
2022	Matilda the Musical	Mrs. Phelps	Movies
2023	My Mother's Wedding	Belkis	Movies
2023–2024	Springleaf	Sita (voice)	Podcast series 7 episodes only
2024	The Completely Made-Up Adventures of Dick Turpin	Lady Saltley	TV miniseries 1 episode only
2024	The Pradeeps of Pittsburgh	Sudha Pradeep	TV miniseries 8 episodes only
2024	That Christmas	Mrs. Mulji (voice)	Movies
2025	Picture This	Laxmi "Lax" Jaswani	Movies
2026–present	The Split Up	Harshika Sharma	TV series

=== Writer ===
Year	Title	Note
2018	Sky Comedy: Sindhu Vee's Live and Let Love	TV miniseries

=== Self ===
Year	Title	Role	Note(s)
2016	BBC Asian Network Comedy	Herself	TV series 1 episode only
2017	Alan Davies: As Yet Untitled	Herself	TV series 1 episode only
2018	Have I Got News for You	Herself	TV series 1 episode only
2018	Stand Up at BBC Wales	Herself	TV miniseries 1 episode only
2018	River Walks	Herself	TV series 1 episode only
2018	Quote... Unquote	Herself	Radio programme 1 episode only
2018	BBC Radio 4 Comedy of the Week: Sindhustan	Herself	Radio programme
2018-2022	The Unbelievable Truth	Herself	Radio programme 12 episodes only
2019	Utterly Outrageous Comedy	Herself	TV series 1 episode only
2019	The Tez O'Clock Show	Herself	TV series 3 episodes only
2019	Comedians Giving Lectures	Herself	TV series 1 episode only
2019	The Apprentice: You're Fired!	Herself	TV series 1 episode only
2019	Mock the Week	Herself	TV series 2 episodes only
2019	Jack Dee Live at the Apollo	Herself	TV series 1 episode only
2019–2022	QI	Herself	TV series 3 episodes only
2019–2022	Off Menu with Ed Gamble and James Acaster	Herself	Podcast series 2 episodes only
2020	Stuart Goldsmith's Infinite Sofa	Herself	TV series 1 episode only
2020	The Lock Inn Pub Quiz	Herself	TV series 1 episode only
2020	Who Said That?	Herself	TV series 1 episode only
2020	Richard Herring's Leicester Square Theatre Podcast	Herself	Podcast series 1 episode only
2020	Comedy Game Night	Herself	TV series 1 episode only
2020	Secrets of the Apollo	Herself	TV movie
2020	The Last Leg	Herself	TV series 2 episodes only
2020–2021	Hypothetical	Herself	TV series 2 episodes only
2020–2025	The Jonathan Ross Show	Herself	TV series 3 episodes only
2021	Extraordinary Escapes	Herself	TV series 1 episode only
2021	Would I Lie to You?	Herself	TV series 1 episode only
2021	Richard Osman's House of Games	Herself	TV series 5 episodes only
2021	Mel Giedroyc: Unforgivable	Herself	TV series 1 episode only
2021	There's Something About Movies	Herself	TV series 1 episode only
2021	Breaking the News	Herself	Podcast series 1 episode only
2021	Soho Theatre Live	Herself	TV series 1 episode only
2021	Just One Thing - with Michael Mosley	Herself	Podcast series 1 episode only
2021	Richard Osman's House of Games Night	Herself	TV series 3 episodes only
2021	Between the Covers	Herself	TV series 1 episode only
2021–2023	Pointless Celebrities	Herself	TV series 2 episodes only
2021–2024	Brydon &	Herself	TV series 2 episodes only
2022	Guessable	Herself	TV series 1 episode only
2022	Paul Sinha's TV Showdown	Herself	TV series 1 episode only
2022	Rhod Gilbert's Growing Pains	Herself	TV series 1 episode only
2022	This Is My House	Herself	TV series 1 episode only
2022	The Wheel	Herself	TV series 1 episode only
2022	The Weakest Link	Herself	TV series 1 episode only
2023	Three Little Words	Herself	Podcast series 1 episode only
2023	Strictly Come Dancing	Herself	TV series 1 episode only
2024	Big Zuu's 12 Dishes in 12 Hours	Herself	TV series 1 episode only
2024	Falling Upwards	Herself	Podcast series 1 episode only
2024	Celebrity Mastermind	Herself	TV series 1 episode only

=== Archive footage ===
Year	Title	Role	Note(s)
2018	Have I Got News for You	Herself	TV series 1 episode only
2019–2022	Mock the Week	Herself	TV series 3 episodes only
2019–2022	QI	Herself	TV series 5 episodes only
2021	Would I Lie to You?	Herself	TV series 2 episodes only
