= Phil Black =

Australian freelance reporter

Phil Black is an Australian former CNN International freelance reporter, based in London. Black joined CNN in April 2007 and covers stories around Europe. In 2008 he was part of CNN's team covering the Russian–Georgian conflict, which broke out over separatist South Ossetia.

Black is a former reporter for Seven News in Sydney, New South Wales, Australia. Having joined Seven News as a senior producer in 2000, he then moved to the reporting team. Some of the stories he has covered include the CityRail crisis, Redfern riots, the 2002 Christmas bushfires and the Sarah, Duchess of York pay for access scandal in May 2010. One of his most important stories was in December 2004, where he reported from Sri Lanka after the Boxing Day tsunami.

Black was in Bathurst for several weeks for the 2006 Bathurst 1000, the first after the death of Peter Brock. Black reported live to Seven News in Sydney almost each night while he was in Bathurst.

Before joining Seven News, Black worked for about five years at the Nine Network where he was a reporter on the travel program Getaway.

Black has reported the news from the Russian invasion of Ukraine in 2022, often from close to the conflict.

He is married to British comedian Ellie Taylor; the couple have two children.
