= Ellie Taylor =

British presenter, comedian and actress

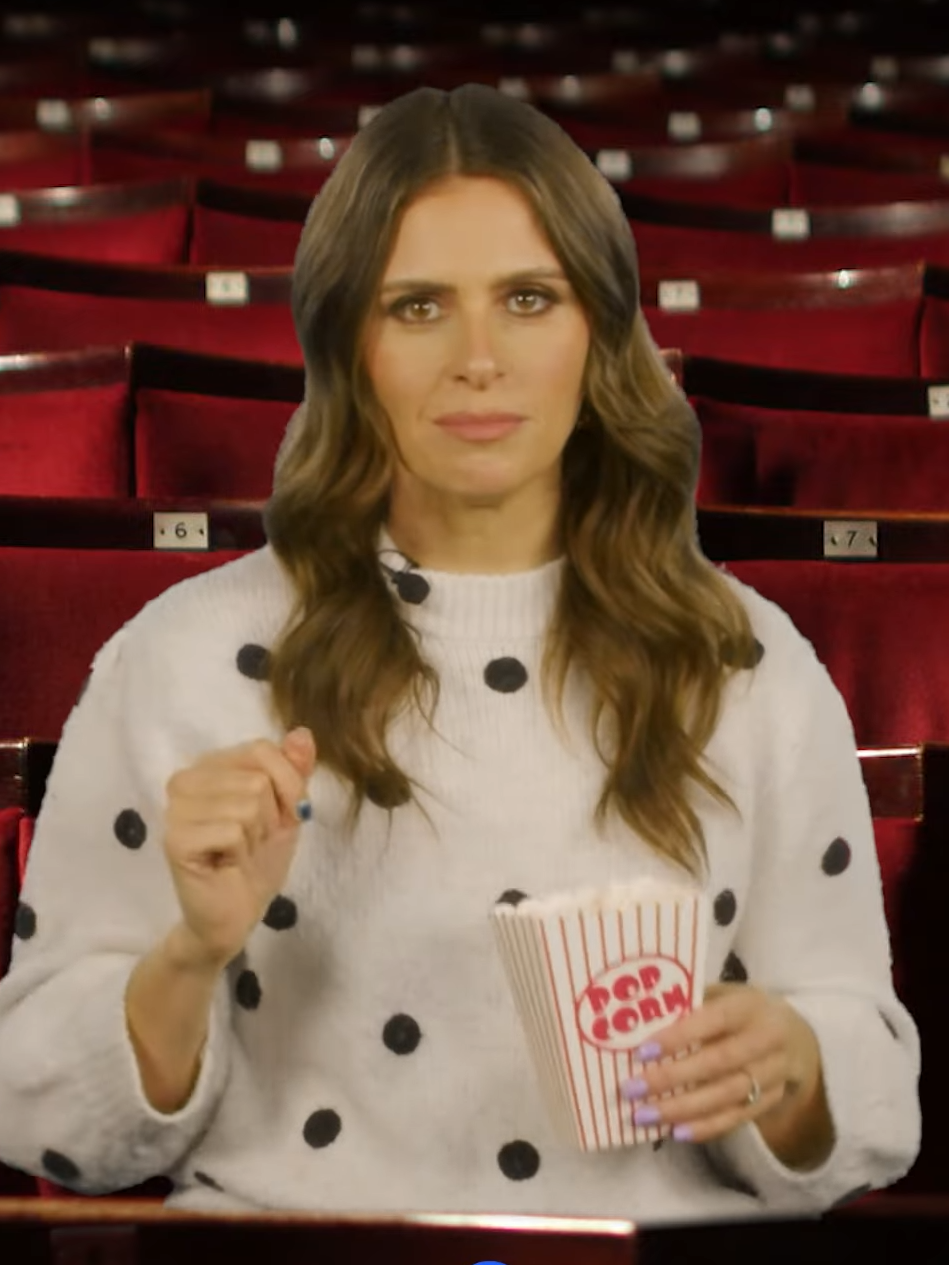
- Taylor in 2025
- Born: Eleanor Taylor; 1983 or 1984 (age 42–43); Basildon, Essex, England
- Education: University of York
- Occupations: Comedian; television personality; actress; writer
- Spouse: Phil Black (m. 2014)
- Children: 2

Comedy career
- Years active: 2011–present
- Medium: Stand-up; television; radio
- Website: ellietaylorcomedy.com

Eleanor Taylor (born 1983 or 1984) is an English comedian, television personality, actress and writer. She has appeared on numerous television shows, including 8 Out of 10 Cats (2011–2017), Fake Reaction (2013–2014), Mock the Week (2015–2019, 2026), Stand-Up Central (2017), The Mash Report (2017–2022), Plebs (2018–2019), Strictly Come Dancing (2022), and Knuckles (2024).

As a television presenter, Taylor has hosted Snog Marry Avoid? (2012–2013), Live at the Apollo (2016–2018), The Great Pottery Throw Down (2022), Bake Off: The Professionals (2023–present), and Strictly Come Dancing: It Takes Two (2026–Present). From 2020 to 2023, she played the role of Flo "Sassy" Collins in Apple TV's Ted Lasso. In 2021, she published her debut book, My Child and Other Mistakes, which became a Sunday Times bestseller.

Taylor has written and performed six stand-up comedy shows: Elliementary (2015), Infidelliety (2016), This Guy (2017–2018), Cravings (2019) — also shown on Netflix as part of Comedians of the World — Don't Got This (2019–2021), and Palavering! (2025).

== Early life and education ==
Taylor was born in Basildon, Essex, and grew up in Brentwood.

She studied English literature at the University of York. Taylor was a member of the University of York Drama Society and "did three or four plays".

== Career ==
Taylor was spotted by a model agency scout while interning for FHM magazine, and signed with ISIS Models. She did campaigns for Matalan, Asda and Pantene. She decided she would rather not be a model, so she began working on corporate events. In her mid-twenties, Taylor began doing stand-up comedy.

Taylor was discovered on ITV series Show Me the Funny, an X Factor-style contest for aspiring stand-up comedians. In 2014, she performed her debut show Elliementary at the Laughing Horse as part of the Edinburgh free fringe programme.

In 2014, she hosted a radio show on London-based Fubar Radio alongside comedian Simon Feilder.

In June 2015, she made her debut in the 14th series of BBC Two's Mock the Week, and appeared in every series until the 18th.

In March 2016, Taylor appeared in the third series of CBBC's panel show The Dog Ate My Homework. She appeared a second time later that month.

In September 2016, Taylor had a recurring role in The Lodge as Christina. Taylor also plays Gloria, the next-door business-owner to the main characters in ITV2 Ancient Roman comedy series Plebs.

In 2017, Taylor became a regular fill-in for Emma Bunton on London's Heart Radio breakfast show.

Since July 2017, she has been a regular on BBC2 satirical comedy sketch series The Mash Report, appearing as Susan, a newsreader. A clip of one of her performances on the show later went viral, after it was posted across social media by Madonna.

In 2018, Taylor appeared in an advert for Stowford Press cider.

On 5 July 2018, it was announced Taylor and Anna Whitehouse would host a new talk show on radio station Heart FM on Sunday nights from 10pm to 1am. The show later became available as a podcast, Ellie and Anna Have Issues.

Taylor has been a regular on the BBC TV stand-up-comedy programme Live at the Apollo, both as a featured act and as a host.

In 2019, her half-hour stand-up special Cravings was released on Netflix as part of Comedians of the World.

Taylor has also been a guest on 8 Out of 10 Cats, Pointless Celebrities, Insert Name Here, QI, The Last Leg, Big Brother's Bit on the Side, and Show Me the Funny. In 2011, she won Company magazine's Lady HaHa title. In 2012, she replaced Jenny Frost as the presenter of Snog Marry Avoid? on BBC Three. She was one of the team leaders on the comedy panel show Fake Reaction. In 2013, she appeared in an episode of the HBO mockumentary series Family Tree.

In 2019, she again became a fill-in presenter on Heart, this time for Amanda Holden, on the national breakfast show alongside regular host Jamie Theakston.

In December 2019, it was announced that Taylor would step down from her Heart FM show to focus on her TV commitments. However, her podcast with Anna Whitehouse, Ellie & Anna Have Issues, is still released every Tuesday.

In July 2021, Taylor published her debut book My Child and Other Mistakes: How to ruin your life in the best way possible, which became a Sunday Times bestseller.

In August 2022, she was revealed as a contestant on the twentieth series of Strictly Come Dancing. Taylor and her professional dance partner Johannes Radebe were eliminated in Week 10 after losing the dance off to Fleur East and Vito Coppola.

In 2025, Taylor was the guest co-presenter for Pointless, appearing in the last nine episodes of series 32 and the first two episodes of series 33.

== Personal life ==
Taylor married reporter Phil Black in 2014. They live in Brentwood, Essex, and have a daughter (born 2018) and son (born 2023).

== Filmography ==
Year	Title	Role	Notes
2011	Show Me the Funny	Contestant	1 episode: "Blackpool"
2011–2012, 2017	8 Out of 10 Cats	Herself	Guest panellist; 3 episodes
2012	Don't Tell The Bride Goes Global	Presenter	TV special
2012	Snog Marry Avoid?		Fifth and sixth series
2012	Big Brother's Bit on the Side	Herself	Guest panellist; 3 episodes
2013	Family Tree	Tracey	1 episode: "Treading the Boards"
2013	The Body Shocking Show	Herself	3 episodes
2013	Greatest Stand Up Comedians	Herself	Documentary
2013–2014	Fake Reaction	Herself	Team captain; 18 episodes
2014	Celebrity Squares	Contestant	1 episode
2014	I'm a Celebrity...Get Me Out of Here! Now!	Herself	Guest; 3 episodes
2014–2015	Sweat the Small Stuff	Herself	2 episodes
2015	Brotherhood	Poppy	Recurring role; 8 episodes
2015	Make You Laugh Out Loud	Herself	Guest; 1 episode: "Pets Make You Laugh Out Loud 2"
2015	Celebrity Fifteen to One	Contestant	1 episode
2015–2016	It Was Alright in the...	Herself	7 episodes
2015–2017	Virtually Famous	Herself	Guest panellist; 3 episodes
2015–2019	Mock the Week	Herself	Guest panellist; 10 episodes
2016	The Lodge	Christina	8 episodes
2016	Drunk History	Drunk Storyteller	1 episode: "Battle of Trafalgar / The Virgin Queen"
2016	Alan Davies: As Yet Untitled	Herself	2 episodes
2016	The Dog Ate My Homework	Herself	Guest; 2 episodes
2016	Funny, Furry & Famous	Herself	
2016	My Worst Job	Herself	Guest; 2 episodes
2016	Celebrity Chase	Contestant	1 episode
2016, 2018	Live at the Apollo	Guest Performer / Presenter	2 episodes
2017	Sick Note	Reporter	1 episode: "Playing Ball"
2017	Josh	Spin Teacher	1 episode: "Bicycles & Babies"
2017	Stand Up Central	Herself	Comedy Central special; 1 episode
2017	Let's Sing and Dance for Comic Relief	Herself	1 episode
2017	I Live with Models	Herself	1 episode: "Don't Hit On Molly"
2017	The Chris Ramsey Show	Herself	Guest; 1 episode
2017	The Nightly Show	Announcer	5 episodes
2017	Go 8 Bit	Contestant	1 episode
2017–2020	The Mash Report	Newsreader Susan Traherne	Recurring role; 24 episodes
2018	I'll Get This	Herself	1 episode
2018	CelebAbility	Herself	Guest; 1 episode
2018	Made in Chelsea	Presenter	1 episode "End of Season Party"
2018	The One Show	Guest Presenter	1 episode
2018	House of Games	Contestant	10 episodes
2018–2019	Pointless Celebrities	Contestant	2 episodes
2018–2019	Plebs	Gloria	Recurring role; 10 episodes
2018–2020	Richard Osman's House of Games	Herself	10 episodes
2019	Insert Name Here	Herself	1 episode
2019	Comedians of the World	Herself	Netflix series; 1 episode
2019	Would I Lie To You?	Herself	Guest; 1 episode
2019	QI	Herself	Guest; S16E15
2019	The Crystal Maze	Contestant / Adventurer	1 episode
2019, 2021	The Last Leg	Herself	Guest; 2 episodes
2020	Tipping Point: Lucky Stars	Contestant	1 episode
2020	Guessable	Herself	Guest; 1 episode
2020	Comedy Game Night	Herself	1 episode
2020–2023	Ted Lasso	Flo "Sassy" Collins	7 episodes Nominated – Online Film & Television Association Award for Best Guest Actress in a Comedy Series
2021	Hypothetical	Herself	1 episode
2021	Comedians Giving Lecturers	Herself	Guest; 1 episode
2021	Yesterday, Today & the Day Before	Presenter	Also writer; 1 episode
2021–2022	Late Night Mash	Newsreader Susan	Dave's version of The Mash Report; 6 episodes
2022	Strictly Come Dancing	Contestant	Series 20
2022	Mastermind	Contestant	Celebrity edition; 1 episode
2022	Let's Make a Love Scene	Presenter	Two-part series
2022	Celebrity Lingo	Contestant	One episode
2022	The Great Pottery Throw Down	Co-presenter	With Siobhán McSweeney
2022	You Won't Believe This (w/t)	Presenter	Four-part series
2023	Cheat	Co-host	Alongside Danny Dyer. Game show
2023	The Great Stand Up to Cancer Bake Off	Contestant	1 episode
2023	Alan Davies: As Yet Untitled	Herself	1 episode
2023	The Wheel	Celebrity expert	Specialist subject: breakfast; 1 episode
2023	The Great British Bake Off: An Extra Slice	Celebrity guest	One episode
2023	Big Zuu's Big Eats	Celebrity guest	One episode
2023–present	Bake Off: The Professionals	Co-host	Series 8–onwards
2024	Knuckles	Agent Willoughby	Miniseries
2025	Celebrity Gladiators	Herself / Contestant	One episode
2026	Strictly Come Dancing: It Takes Two	Herself / Host	Series 24–onwards
2026	The Box	Herself / Contestant	
TBA	Next on the Menu	Herself / Host	Upcoming series

== Tours ==
- Elliementary (2015)
- Infidelliety (2016)
- This Guy (2017–2018)
- Cravings (2019)
- Don't Got This (2019–2021)
- Palavering! (2025)

== Bibliography ==
- My Child and Other Mistakes: How to Ruin Your Life in the Best Way Possible (2021)
