= Cheat (game show) =

2023 reality television show

- Genre: Game show
- Presented by: Danny Dyer, Ellie Taylor
- Country of origin: United Kingdom
- Original language: English
- No. of series: 1
- No. of episodes: 12

Production
- Producers: Paul King; Nick Shearing
- Editors: Paul Cope; Matt Armstrong
- Running time: 30–42 minutes

Original release
- Network: Netflix
- Release: 1 March – 15 March 2023

Cheat (styled as CH£AT, though the pound currency sign is variation of the letter L) is a British game show hosted by Danny Dyer and Ellie Taylor. The 12 episodes of its only series were released on Netflix in March 2023.

== Game play ==
Each episode features four contestants who are asked a series of trivia questions. Contestants can answer them or choose, by subtly pressing a button, to be given the correct answer to say – to cheat. After each question, the other contestants can accuse the answerer of cheating. At the end of the first round, the cheaters are revealed along with all remaining players' performance, and the contestant best at detecting cheating gets to eliminate one of the others.

After 2 round of questions – with cheaters exposed immediately after an accusation this time – the best cheat detector again eliminates another contestant. The remaining two compete in a final round that ends with either the first wrong answer or the first accusation of cheating. If correct, the accuser wins; if wrong, the accused wins.

Each correct answer added £1,000 in round 1, £3,000 in round 2 to the prize pot, any wrong answers will be deducted from the prize pot. Cheats will add the relevant amount to the prize pot but will be treated as a deduction later. Eliminating a player can refund the appropriate amount based on the number of cheats they used. A maximum potential cash prize of £52,000 can be earned.

== Response ==
The show received mixed to negative reviews, with Anita Singh of The Telegraph calling it a "torturously boring and confusing...Whoever commissioned Cheat was a right mug." Joel Keller of Decider rated it a "Stream It" (as opposed to "Skip It"), but criticised its "simple premise that's bogged down by complex gameplay...things get way more complicated than they need to be."

The show was cancelled by Netflix after only one series.
