= Alex Riley (comedian) =

British comedian

- Born: Alexander John Riley; 29 March 1968 (age 58); Sheffield, West Riding of Yorkshire, England
- Notable work: The Caravan Show, the one show and the car years
- Children: 2 sons

Comedy career
- Years active: 1988–present
- Medium: Stand up, television

Alexander John Riley (born 29 March 1968 in Sheffield, Yorkshire) is an English TV and radio presenter, comedian and car journalist.

== Early life and education ==
Born and brought up in Sheffield, Riley started performing with the city's Crucible Youth Theatre, during which time he originated, and appeared in, sketches and devised pieces, as well as appearing in a number of plays and farces at the Library Theatre.

== Career ==
Riley had a succession of jobs, including spells managing a shopping centre and selling aerial photographs, before successfully answering an on-air appeal for researchers on BBC TV's Top Gear programme. A lifelong car enthusiast, Riley was in his element writing scripts for racing driver turned presenter Vicki Butler-Henderson and making many cameo appearances before being given the chance to present his own items. Amongst these were a 9-hour road trip from London to Brighton on the world's oldest vehicle, a challenge to build a car in 16 hours from junk bought at Europe's largest auto jumble sale and appearing as Elvis at the UK's premier American lifestyle festival.

He went on to write and perform sketches for BBC One specials on the Chelsea Flower Show and Britain in Bloom, appear as a bed-hopping bigamist in a prime time BBC One documentary Bigamy and write and present Short Circuits, an innovative 10-part series for Discovery Home and Leisure which combined Scalextric with tips on making realistic scenery out of chicken wire. Moving sideways to radio, he was chosen as the voice of The Comedy Club, a nightly 2-hour comedy strand which played a significant part in BBC7 achieving the Sony Gold Award for Station Sound.

Returning to TV, Riley has presented two series of Boys Toys, a series for ITV1 West Country, the Caravan Show for Discovery Real Time, a tongue-in-cheek active sports series You Know You Want To (again for ITV1 Westcountry) and, after buying a Triumph TR7, Classic Car Club, for Discovery Real Time. He has also been a "traveller" for Globe Trekker.

For BBC Three's Mischief series Riley has also presented documentaries which made use of dramatic stunts to confront those responsible for problems on the UK's public transport network and for the fact that thousands of homes across the country lie empty at a time when housing is in short supply. For a 2008 Mischief documentary on food titled Britain's Really Disgusting Foods, Riley attempted to create his own "Mr Riley's" meat pie using the minimum requirements set by the Food Standards Agency. When shown on BBC One, it got 2.6 million viewers, prompting the creation of a series of 3 documentaries titled Britain's Really Disgusting Food, aired in January 2009. His new show aired in 2010 called Britain's Really Disgusting Drink. From 2015, Riley has appeared 6 times on the CBBC panel show The Dog Ate My Homework. Riley also hosts All Over the Workplace for CBBC.
