= Yuriko Kotani =

Japanese comedian

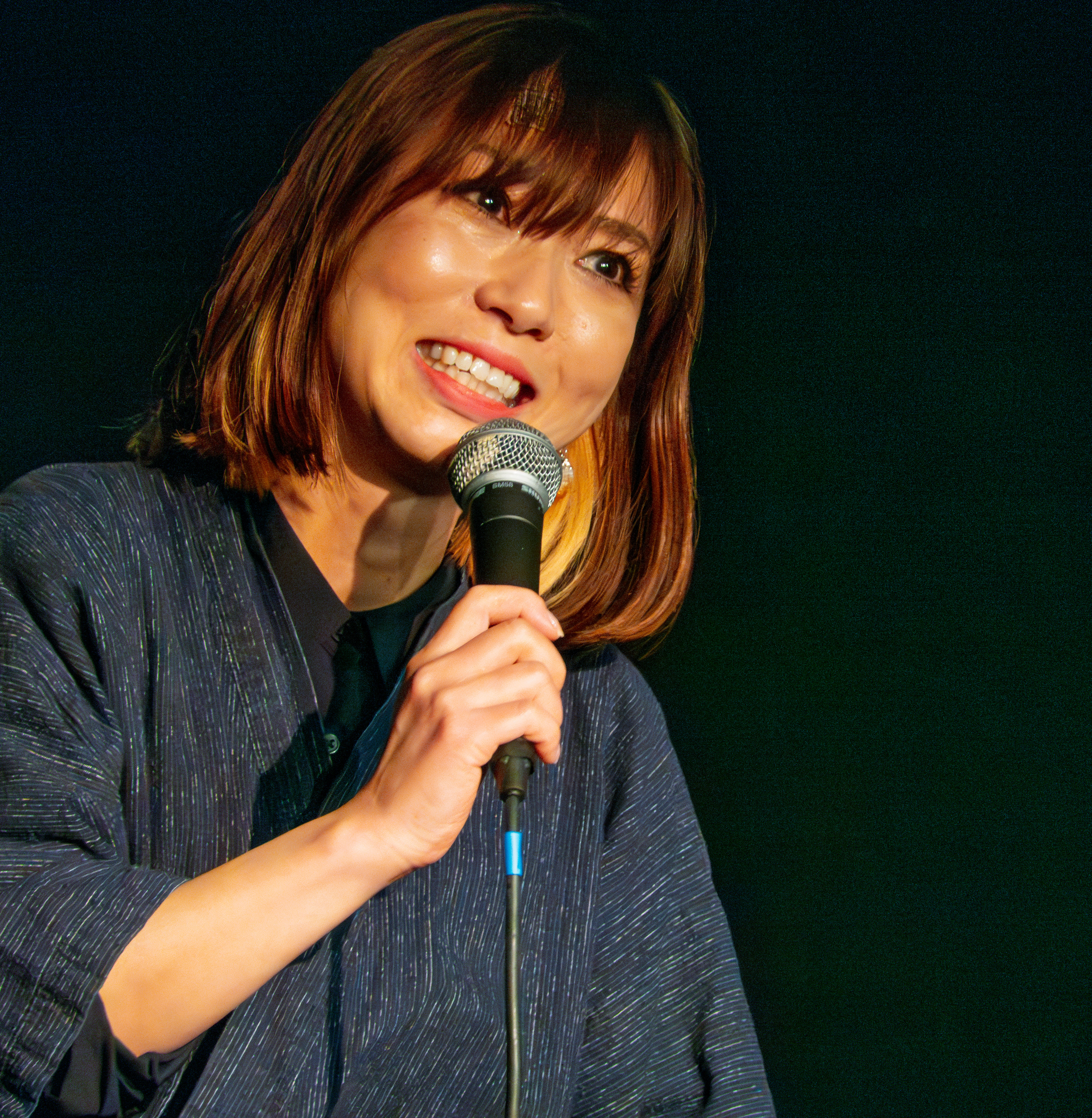
- Yuriko Kotani in 2024
- Years active: 2014–present
- Website: www.yurikokotani.com

Yuriko Kotani is a Japanese comedian based in London. She won the 2015 BBC Radio New Comedy Award, making her the first Japanese person to win the award. She debuted her solo show Somosomo at the 2019 Edinburgh Fringe Festival. Kotani's comedy makes fun of the cultural differences between England and her homeland of Japan.

== Early life and career ==
Kotani is from Aichi Prefecture. She moved to England in 2005 aged 24 with her then-boyfriend, who had been studying abroad in Japan. She was introduced to and "fell in love with British comedy". She began performing stand-up of her own in 2014.

== Breakthrough ==
In 2015 Kotani was nominated for a number of awards for her comedy. Most notably, in November 2015 she won the BBC Radio New Comedy Award, aged 34.

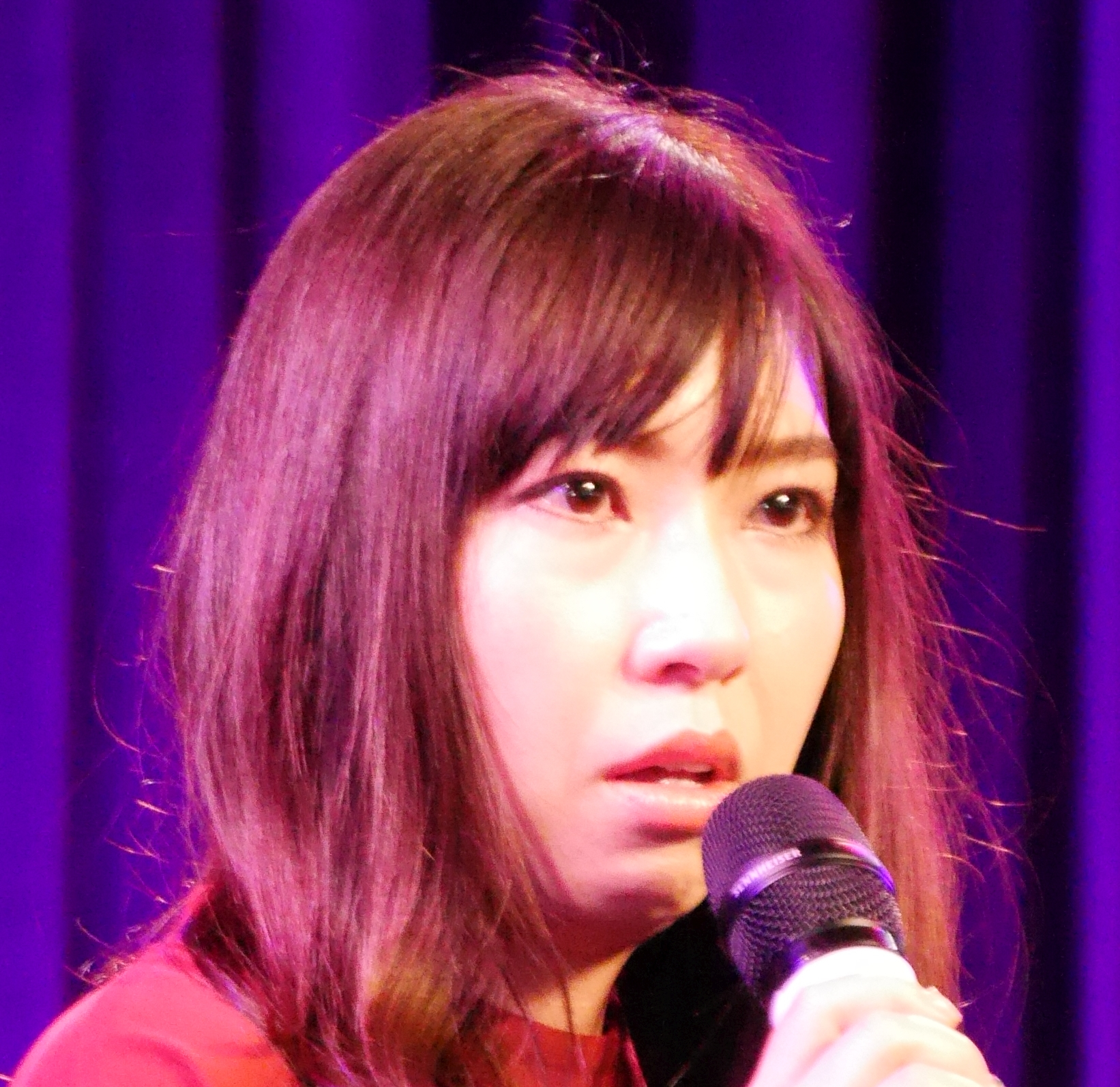
Kotani at the 2019 Glastonbury Festival

She was named as "One To Watch" by Time Out in 2015. She went on to become first runner-up in So You Think You're Funny 2015?, won the Brighton Comedy Festival Squawker Award 2015, placed third in the Leicester Square Theatre New Comedian of the Year 2015, and was nominated for Leicester Mercury Comedian of the Year in 2016.

On the radio, Kotani has been interviewed on The Comedy Club on BBC Radio 4 Extra.

Kotani has made a number of appearances on British television. In 2016, Kotani appeared on series 2 of Russell Howard's Stand Up Central.

In March 2017, Kotani made her TV acting debut in the BBC Three mockumentary Pls Like as Nozomi Hottah.

In January 2018, Kotani appeared on the CBBC panel show, The Dog Ate My Homework. In 2020, Kotani appeared in an episode of Paul Hollywood Eats Japan on Channel 4.

In May 2021 she starred alongside Rich Keeble as a scientist extracting DNA from present and former players in a comedy film unveiling Southampton Football Club's new 2021/22 season kit. Players featured in the film included James Ward-Prowse, Matt Le Tissier and Francis Benali. In May 2025 she appeared in the second series of the Channel 4 comedy “The Horne Section TV Show” as Amanda Lynn, a ghost hunter/ghost.
