= Bec Hill =

Australian comedian, writer, presenter, actor, director, and YouTuber

- Hill in 2026
- Born: Rebecca Natani Hill; 4 November 1986 (age 39); Adelaide, Australia
- Other name: BeChill
- Occupations: Comedian; Writer; Presenter; Actor; Director; YouTuber

YouTube information
- Channel: Bec Hill
- Years active: 2009–present
- Subscribers: 54.8 thousand
- Views: 7.56 million
- Last updated: 11 August 2025
- Website: bechillcomedian.com

External videos
- Frankie the Christmas Fox by Bec Hill

Rebecca Natani Hill (born 4 November 1986) is an Australian comedian, writer, presenter, actor, director, and YouTuber born in Adelaide who is now based in the UK.

== Career ==
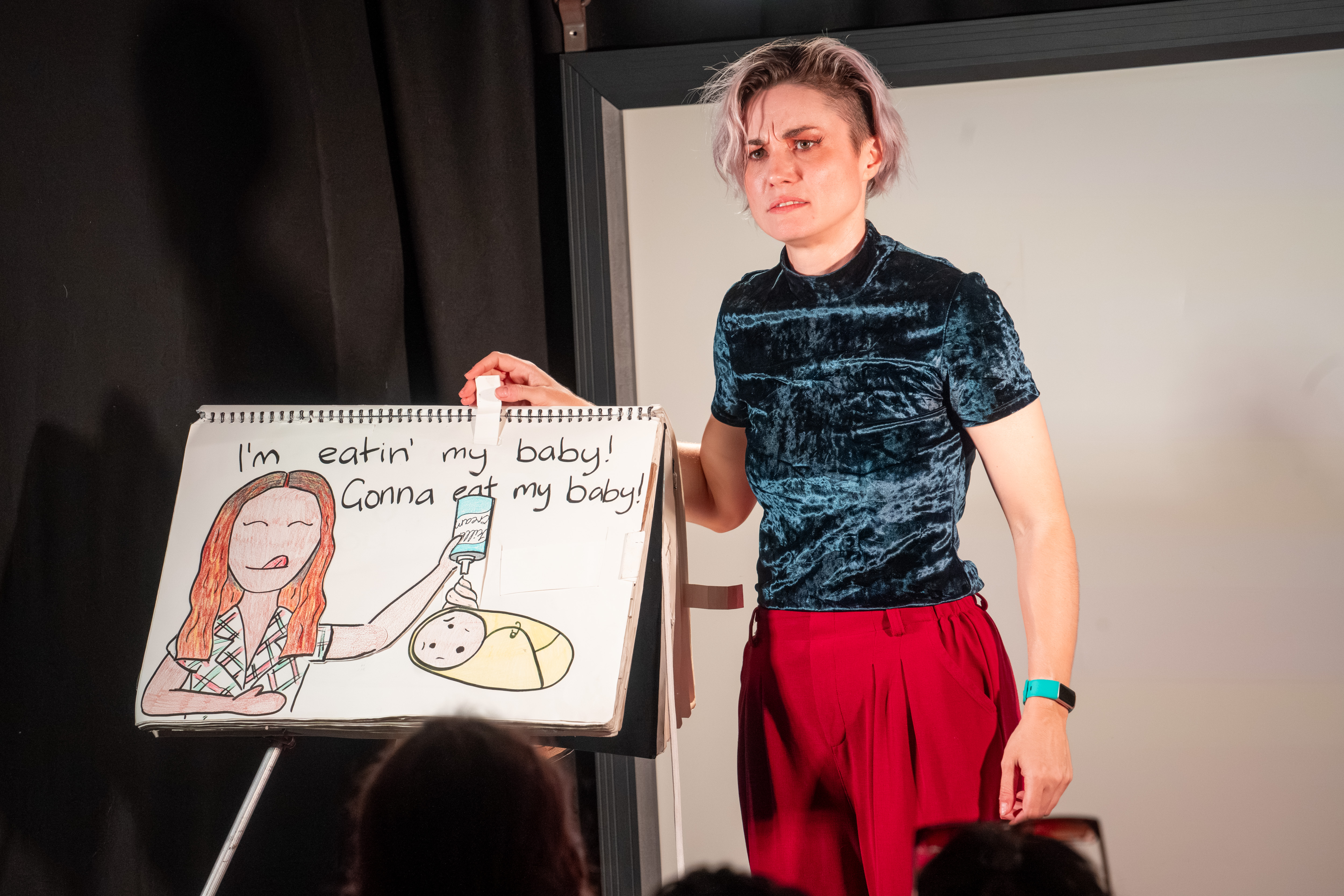
Bec Hill at the 2025 Edinburgh Festival Fringe

Hill incorporates arts and crafts into her stand-up routines in something she calls paper puppetry. It can be likened to pop-up books or the Japanese storytelling technique Kamishibai.

She took part in the first edition of the UK Kids' Comedy Festival, part of the 2019 Leicester Comedy Festival. Her show, "Bec Hill Treats You Like a Child", won the festival's award for Best Kids' Show.

In 2016 she was a co-host of Sky's "DC Fancast" and "DC Fancast: Unmasked" with Des Taylor and Rick Edwards. She has also appeared on several series of CBBC's panel show The Dog Ate My Homework, and starred in the 2014 Sundance UK Grand Jury Prize-winning short film "Russian Roulette", directed by Ben Aston.

In February 2021 she appeared on Channel 4's 8 Out of 10 Cats Does Countdown (episode 5, series 21) alongside Susie Dent in Dictionary Corner.

She hosts podcasts including A Problem Squared with Matt Parker, The DesignSpark Podcast, and Con Sessions, as well as a 'Hatewatch' podcast of the Netflix show Emily In Paris, aptly named Enemy in Paris.

She has collaborated with Jay Foreman on three of his YouTube videos, entitled "Dinosaurs", "Fiddle With Your Balls" and "Robot Olympics".

Hill also presents CITV show Makeaway Takeaway, an arts-and-crafts comedy sketch show for 6-11-year-olds.

== Awards and recognition ==
Her one-liners have featured in best-joke lists for media outlets such as The Telegraph, Dave, The Guardian, The Independent, Daily Record and Buzzfeed. She has also appeared in a worst-joke list. She has also written for The Amazing World of Gumball, Bluestone 42 and The Now Show. Her short animation directorial debut, "Scoring Pointes", aired on Disney XD in 2016.

Hill won two awards for her shows at the 2014 Edinburgh Festival. "Bec And Tom's Awesome Laundry", a children's show performed with Tom Goodliffe, won a ThreeWeeks Editors' Award. Her show "Ellipsis" won the Barry Award for Best Performer, voted on by other performers at the Fringe.

== Publications ==
In 2021, Hill worked with Hachette to publish a series of children's books, Horror Heights.

== Books ==
- Hill, Bec (2021). Horror Heights: The Slime. Hachette. ISBN 9781444962314.
- Hill, Bec (2022). Horror Heights: Now Livescreaming. Hachette. ISBN 9781444962345.
- Hill, Bec (2023). Horror Heights: Dead Ringer. Hachette. ISBN 9781444962369.
