= Darren Harriott =

British comedian

- Born: 1 September 1988
- Website: darrenharriott.com

Darren Harriott (born 1 September 1988) is a British stand-up comedian from Oldbury, West Midlands. He was nominated for the Best Newcomer Award and Best Show Award at the Edinburgh Fringe Festival in 2017 and 2019 respectively.

== Early life ==
Harriott was born to parents Patrick and Paulette, and grew up in Oldbury, near Birmingham in the West Midlands. His father was a drug dealer who was jailed during Harriott's childhood. He died by suicide while Harriott was still a child.

== Career ==
Harriott moved to London at the age of 26 to pursue a career in comedy. He worked as a security guard at venues including the Hammersmith Apollo to finance his early years.

Harriott has toured the UK with his shows Visceral and Good Heart Yute, and regularly appears at comedy clubs across the country. His stand-up shows became the basis for his BBC Radio 4 series Darren Harriott's Black Label.

Harriott has appeared on multiple television shows such as Live at the Apollo, The Last Leg, Ghost Bus Tours, Hey Tracey!, Comedy Games Night, 8 Out of 10 Cats, The Apprentice: You're Fired!, The Great British Bake Off: An Extra Slice, Catchpoint for Sport Relief, University Challenge for Comic Relief, CelebAbility, The Stand Up Sketch Show, Jon Richardson: Ultimate Worrier, Celebrity Mastermind, Pointless Celebrities, Dave Gorman: Terms and Conditions Apply, Dave's Comedy Against Living Miserably, Comedy Central Live, Roast Battle, Mock the Week, Comedy Central at the Comedy Store, Hypothetical, Russell Howard's Stand Up Central, Don't Hate the Playaz, Love Island, and The Comedy Bus.

On radio he has hosted Newsjack Unplugged, Comedy of the Week for BBC Radio 4 and the BBC Radio 4 Summer Festival. Radio appearances include BBC Radio 4 shows Best of the Fest and The Now Show, and BBC Radio 5 Live comedy sports panel show Fighting Talk.

He appeared on Dave's Campaign Against Living Miserably, where he discussed his father's incarceration and death.

In late 2021, Harriott co-presented the Dave travelogue British as Folk alongside fellow comedians Ivo Graham and Fern Brady. In 2022, he was a regular panellist on Love Island's companion show Aftersun. He co-hosts the podcast Shame is Delicious with Eshaan Akbar.

In 2023, Harriott was a contestant on the fifteenth series of Dancing on Ice, finishing seventh alongside professional partner Tippy Packard.

== Filmography ==
TV
Year	Programme	Channel	Notes
2016	Stand Up Central	Comedy Central	Series 2, Episode 1
2017	Live at the Apollo	BBC	Series 13, Episode 3
2018	The Great Xmas Rant	ITV	-
2018	Mock the Week	BBC	Series 17, Episode 1
2018	Comedy Central at The Comedy Store	Comedy Central	Series 5, Episodes 2 and 7
2018	Roast Battle	Comedy Central	Series 2, Episode 4
2019	'Don't Hate the Playaz	ITV	Series Regular
2019	The Stand Up Sketch Show	ITV	Series 1, Episode 3
2019	The Dog Ate My Homework	BBC	
2019	Hypothetical	Dave	Series 1, Episode 6
2019	The Comedy Bus	Comedy Central	Series 1, Episode 6
2019	Comic Relief	BBC	Celebrity University Challenge aired as part of a telethon
2019	CelebAbility	ITV	Series 4, Episode 4
2019	Jon Richardson: Ultimate Worrier	Dave	Series 2, Episode 2
2019	The Great British Bake Off: An Extra Slice	Channel 4	Series 3, Episode 8
2019	Dave Gorman's Terms and Conditions Apply	Dave	Episode 5
2019	The Apprentice: You're Fired!	BBC-	Series 14, Episode 5
2019	Live at the Apollo	BBC-	Host/Presenter, Series 15
2019	Romesh Presents...	Sky	Host/Presenter, Episode 8: Stan By Your Man
2019	Celebrity Mastermind	BBC	Series 17, Episode 2
2020	8 out of 10 Cats	E4	Series 22, Episode 7
2020	Comedy Against Living Miserably	Dave	Series 1, Episode 2
2021	Outsiders	Dave	Series 2
2021	Richard Osman's House of Games	BBC Two	Series 4, Episodes 66–70
2021	Would You Rather?	CBBC	Host/Presenter
2021	British as Folk	Dave	Co-presenter
2022	The Real Dirty Dancing	E4	Contestant
2022	Backstage with Katherine Ryan	Amazon Prime Video	Series 1, Episode 5
2022	Love Island: Aftersun	ITV	Regular panellist; series 8
2022	Britain's Top Takeaways	BBC Two	Co-presenter
2023	Dancing on Ice	ITV	Contestant; series 15
2023	Weakest Link	BBC One	Contestant; Series 3, Episode 4
