= Marlon Davis (comedian) =

British actor and stand-up comedian

- Born: 21 June 1983 (age 43); Stonebridge, London, England

Comedy career
- Years active: 2005–present
- Medium: Television and stand-up
- Genre: Comedy
- Website: marlondavis.co.uk

Marlon Davis (born 21 June 1983) is a British actor and stand-up comedian.

== Early and personal life ==
The eldest of six siblings, Davis was brought up on the Stonebridge, London council estate, North West London. Davis is of Jamaican and Grenadian descent. He is a former student of Our Lady of Lourdes R.C Primary School and Cardinal Hinsley R.C High School. He studied B.A Art & Design at University of Westminster

== Career ==
Davis began performing live in 2005 on the UK black comedy circuit. The following year, Davis made the final of two national competitions “Laughing Horse” and "So You Think You're Funny" at the Edinburgh Fringe Festival. In 2009 he won FHM Stand Up Hero which was televised on ITV4. In 2012, Davis debuted his first solo show "Enter The Davism", which sold out its run at both the Pleasance Theatre in Edinburgh and London's Soho Theatre. Davis is represented by Off the Kerb and has supported stand-up comedians Michael McIntyre, Alan Carr, and Kevin Bridges on their respective live tours.

== Television ==
He has appeared on Comedy Central's Comedy Store, BBC Three's Edinburgh Comedy Fest Live, BBC Two's Kevin Eldon Show, MTV’s sitcom Get Rich and The Dog Ate My Homework as well as Live At The Apollo.

== Awards ==
- Winner of FHM Stand Up Hero 2009
