= Most Annoying People =

British television series

- Narrated by: Richard Bacon
- Country of origin: United Kingdom
- No. of series: 6
- No. of episodes: 12

Production
- Running time: 210 minutes (2006); 300 minutes (2007–10); 180 minutes (2011)

Original release
- Network: BBC Three
- Release: 27 December 2006 – 26 December 2011

Most Annoying Person is a British television programme that was broadcast on BBC Three from 27 December 2006 to 26 December 2011 and was usually shown each year during the end of December. The show counted down the 100 "most irritating" people, with celebrities, pop stars, and politicians all in the running. It was narrated by Richard Bacon.

== History ==
The show for 2008 was criticised in March 2009 for homophobic comments about Lindsay Lohan. The BBC Trust's Editorial Standards Committee condemned comments by DJ Spoony and Ron Jeremy and demanded they be cut from future repeats. Agyness Deyn won that year.

== Top Tens ==
Top tens
Year	Most annoying person	Top ten
2006	Pete Doherty	2nd: Nikki Grahame; 3rd: Russell Brand; 4th: Heather Mills; 5th: Tom Cruise and Katie Holmes; 6th: Kerry Katona; 7th: John Prescott; 8th: Sophie Anderton; 9th: Paris Hilton; 10th: Lily Allen
2007	Amy Winehouse	2nd: Heather Mills; 3rd: Posh and Becks; 4th: Jade Goody; 5th: Pete Doherty; 6th: David Hasselhoff; 7th: Paris Hilton; 8th: Tony Blair; 9th: Britney Spears; 10th: Facebook
2008	Agyness Deyn	2nd: Peaches Geldof; 3rd: Gordon Brown; 4th: Kerry Katona; 5th: Thomas Beatie; 6th: Madonna; 7th: Ronnie Wood; 8th: Prince William; 9th: Sienna Miller; 10th: Mitch Winehouse
2009	Katie Price	2nd: United Kingdom parliamentary expenses scandal; 3rd: Jedward; 4th: Lady Gaga; 5th: Gordon Ramsay; 6th: Kerry Katona; 7th: Simon Cowell and Susan Boyle; 8th: Twitter; 9th: Kanye West; 10th: Posh and Becks
2010	England national football team	2nd: Jedward; 3rd: Lindsay Lohan; 4th: Tony Hayward; 5th: Katie Price; 6th: Mel Gibson; 7th: George Michael; 8th: Naomi Campbell; 9th: Tiger Woods; 10th: Lady Gaga
2011	England rioters	2nd: News of the World; 3rd: Superinjunctions; 4th: Ashley Cole; 5th: Charlie Sheen; 6th: Pippa Middleton; 7th: Wayne Rooney; 8th: Madonna; 9th: Darryn Lyons; 10th: Geordie Shore

== Ratings ==
The show for 2011 got 776,000 viewers (3.1%) on 26 December 2011.

== Transmissions ==
Series	Start date	End date	Episodes
1	27 December 2006	28 December 2006	3
2	22 December 2007	23 December 2007	2
3	27 December 2008	29 December 2008	2
4	27 December 2009	28 December 2009	2
5	27 December 2010	28 December 2010	2
6	26 December 2011	27 December 2011	2
