= Ivo Graham =

English stand-up comedian

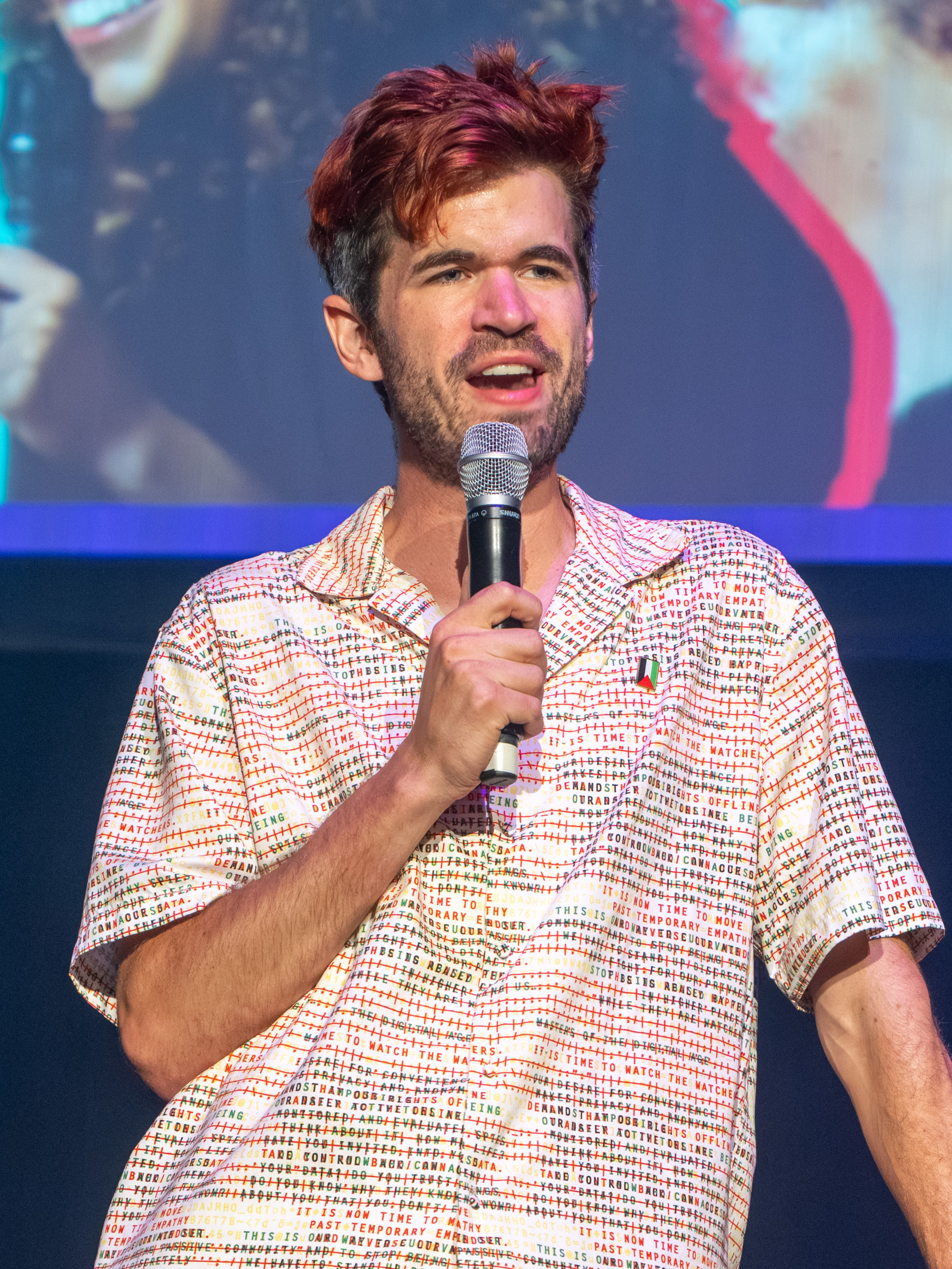
- Graham in 2025
- Born: Ivo Charles Graham; Tokyo, Japan
- Education: Eton College; University College, Oxford
- Occupations: Comedian, actor
- Years active: 2008-present
- Children: 1
- Website: ivograham.com

Ivo Charles Graham (/ˈaɪvoʊ/ EYE-voh) is an English stand-up comedian and comedy writer.

== Early life and education ==
Ivo Charles Graham was born in Tokyo, Japan. He attended day and boarding schools in Australia and the UK, as his family moved around for his father's work. In the UK, he was raised in the village of Aldbourne in Wiltshire.

After attending Eton College, he studied French and Russian literature at University College, Oxford, graduating in 2012.

== Comedy career ==
Graham was the youngest ever winner of So You Think You're Funny? in 2009 and was subsequently signed by UK talent agency Off The Kerb. He was nominated for Best Newcomer at the 2010 Chortle Awards.

His television appearances include The Stand-Up Sketch Show (ITV2), Live at the Apollo, Mock the Week, Live from the BBC, Russell Howard's Stand Up Central, As Yet Untitled, Virtually Famous, QI, Sweat the Small Stuff, and The Dog Ate My Homework, and he is a regular on radio show Fighting Talk. In October 2019 and December 2021, he competed on Richard Osman's House of Games, and appeared on Paul Merton's team on Have I Got News For You on 8 November 2019. Graham appeared again on the show, via webcam due to the COVID-19 pandemic, on 15 May 2020, and was again part of Paul Merton's team. In 2023, Graham competed on the fifteenth season of Taskmaster.

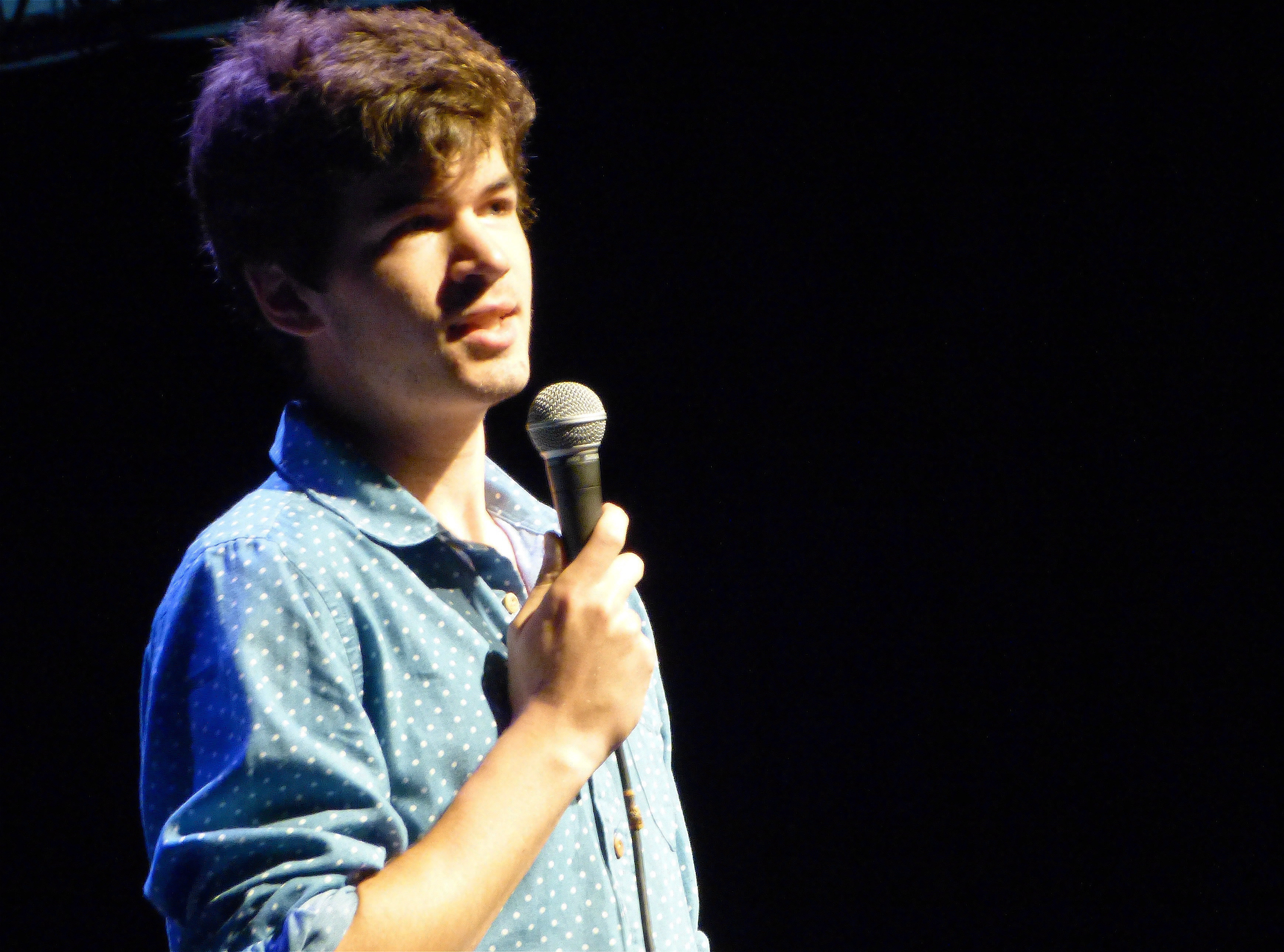
Graham in 2013

Graham regularly performs at the Edinburgh Fringe. His shows Binoculars (2013), Bowties and Johnnies (2014), and No Filter (2015) all transferred to London for runs at the Soho Theatre. His 2017 show Educated Guess garnered good reviews and sold out, prompting several extra shows to be added, which were performed at the Soho Theatre in October.

Graham has also supported Josh Widdicombe on tour.

In 2019, Graham was included in the i-news "50 of the best jokes of the Edinburgh Fringe" with his line: "Do I enjoy randomly appointing people to judicial positions? I'll let you be the judge of that". That year, he was nominated for Best Show at the Edinburgh Festival Fringe for his show, "The Game of Life".

In late 2021, Graham co-presented the Dave travelogue British as Folk alongside fellow comedians Darren Harriott and Fern Brady.

In May 2025, Graham replaced Ben Miller as the voice of Monkey in adverts for PG Tips tea.

== Personal life ==
Graham is a supporter of Swindon Town F.C. He has a daughter, born in February 2019. On the Where There's A Will, There's A Wake podcast with Mel Giedroyc in July 2025, Graham said that his diet is mainly vegetarian.

Graham's mother has multiple sclerosis (MS). Graham is an MS Society Ambassador and has hosted fundraising shows to support the charity.
