= Suzi Ruffell =

British comedian (born 1986)

- Born: 18 January 1986 (age 40); Portsmouth, Hampshire, England
- Occupation: Comedian
- Years active: 2008–present
- Spouse: Alice Storey (m. 2021)
- Children: 1
- Website: suziruffell.com

Suzi Ruffell (born 18 January 1986) is a British comedian, writer, and actress.

== Early life ==
Ruffell was born in Portsmouth to a working-class family. Her father buys and sells lorries and her mother became his assistant after raising Suzi and her older brother.

Ruffell joined a youth drama group which had a major impact on her eventual career choice. She considered Victoria Wood, Catherine Tate, Dawn French and Jennifer Saunders to be her heroes. After Chichester College, she attended drama school at the Academy of Live and Recorded Arts in London, where she first performed stand-up. Ruffell was the first in her family to attend university.

== Career ==
Ruffell began her stand-up comedy career in November 2008 and has been performing stand-up full time since 2012.

Before she began touring as a solo performer, Ruffell had supported Alan Carr, Kevin Bridges, Josh Widdicombe, Joe Lycett, Romesh Ranganathan, and Katherine Ryan on national tours.

Ruffell's stand-up comedy tours include Social Chameleon (toured in 2014–2015), Common (2016–2017), Keeping It Classy (2018, her first headlining tour), Nocturnal (2019), and Dance Like Everyone's Watching (2019–2020). After a year and a half hiatus due to the COVID-19 pandemic, Ruffell resumed the Dance Like Everyone's Watching tour in autumn 2021.

Keeping it Classy was recorded for Live from the BBC and aired on 11 July 2018.

In 2017, Ruffell and her friend Tom Allen performed across the UK on a double-bill tour titled Hit the Road!

In 2018, Ruffell toured Australia as a performer with the Melbourne International Comedy Festival Roadshow.

Also in 2018, she had a leading role in the short film Foreign, directed by Mark Pinkosh.

In 2024, Ruffell's special Snappy was released by 800 Pound Gorilla Media and is available for streaming.

In 2025, Ruffell toured the UK with a show titled The Juggle, which "explores the challenges of balancing various roles in life, from being a good mother to an ambitious professional. The show is a mix of stand-up and a support group, reflecting on the exhaustion that comes with trying to 'smash life' while making it look easy."

On July 12, 2026, Ruffell will appear as one of four featured comedians at the second annual York Comedy Festival.

=== Television and radio ===
Ruffell's first television appearance was on BBC3's Ed Comedy Fest Live, and she has also appeared on numerous shows on Channel 4, E4, Comedy Central and Dave.

She is regularly heard on BBC Radio 4 on The Now Show and The News Quiz.

In addition to performing comedy, Ruffell has written for several television shows, including 8 Out of 10 Cats, The Last Leg, Twit of the Year, Stand Up for the Week, and Mock the Week.

Ruffell appeared with five other British female celebrities in the 2021 BBC2 documentary Womanhood, with the guests discussing the evolving status of women over the past 50 years.

Also in 2021, Ruffell was a presenter on the first two episodes of a female-led satirical news show on Comedy Central titled Yesterday, Today & The Day Before.

=== Podcasts ===
Since October 2015, Ruffell has co-hosted the podcast Like Minded Friends with comedian Tom Allen.

Starting in 2020, Ruffell has hosted the podcast Out with Suzi Ruffell.

In 2022, Ruffell became the co-host of Wine Times, with Sunday Times Wine Club vice-president Will Lyons.

In 2023, Ruffell became the co-host of the podcast Big Kick Energy with fellow comedian Maisie Adam. Having launched the show for the 2023 FIFA Women's World Cup, the series transitioned to following the Women's Super League season and other domestic and international football fixtures. Big Kick Energy won a UK Broadcast Sports Award.

=== Books ===
In July 2025, Ruffell's memoir titled Am I Having Fun Now: Anxiety, Applause and Life's Big Questions was released by Bluebird. The book became an instant Sunday Times bestseller.

== Personal life ==
Ruffell found school difficult and says that she became the "class clown" to hide her dyslexia. She has 4 GCSEs and an AS Level in Contemporary Dance.

Ruffell is a lesbian. She said that she realised she was a lesbian at the age of 14 but did not come out until she was 21. She said her parents were "absolutely fine" about her announcement. Ruffell married her partner Alice Storey in 2021. They have one child together.

== Awards and honors ==
Ruffell was nominated for the Leicester Mercury Comedian of the Year 2011, making it to the finals, and was awarded second place in the Latitude Festival New Act Competition 2011.

A sitcom pilot collaboration with playwright Jon Brittain in 2012 led to a nomination for the BAFTA Rocliffe New Writing Award.

In 2017, she was nominated for Chortle's Best Breakthrough Act. In 2019, she won that website's award for Best Club Comic.

In 2020, Ruffell was nominated for a British LGBT Award in the Broadcaster or Journalist category.

In 2023, Ruffell and Maisie Adam won the Broadcast Sports Award for Best Sports Podcast for Big Kick Energy.

In 2026, Ruffell was one of nine recipients awarded an honorary doctorate from the University of Portsmouth, for "exceptional achievement and outstanding contribution to society".

== See also ==
- List of British comedians
