= The Jon Richardson Show =

- Genre: Music/Comedy
- Running time: 3 hours
- Country of origin: United Kingdom
- Language: English
- Home station: BBC 6Music (before 2025); Absolute Radio (since 2025)
- Starring: Jon Richardson, Matt Forde
- Recording studio: BBC Wogan House (before 2025)
- Audio format: Stereophonic sound
- Website: https://www.bbc.co.uk/6music/shows/jon_richardson/
- Podcast: The Jon Richardson Show podcast

The Jon Richardson Show is a weekly radio show on Absolute Radio, previously on BBC 6Music, which was created due to the departure of Russell Howard from The Russell Howard Show, which Jon Richardson co-hosted with Russell. The show was broadcast on Sundays from 10 am to 1 pm. It was co-hosted by Matt ("Fordie") Forde, who usually joined Jon at 12 noon.

On Sunday 7 February 2010, Richardson announced that after three and a half years on 6 Music, he would be leaving the station after the 7 March show. He said he didn't want "to get typecast as a DJ", as he is a comic. He went on to state "I've loved doing it, so I'd love to do more radio at some point", but after he has asserted himself further as a stand-up comic.

On Sunday 7 March 2010, the last show aired.

== Features ==
Guest Comedian, each week Jon invites a different comedian each week to join him in the studio for usually at least the first hour of the show. Rarely, two or more comedians may also be featured, such as Pappy's Fun Club.

Cheer up Jon, Mark Olver finds someone who would cheer Jon up and they join him on air. These guests have included a Dyson engineer (due to Jon's admiration of the Dyson Airblade handdryer), the current Sheriff of Nottingham, and the lady who coined the phrase "a dog is for life, not just for Christmas" for the Dog's Trust. As of June 2009, this feature no longer appeared on the show, but currently continues under a Christmas theme.

Olvers Olvent Calendolv Mark Olver appears again with a Christmas themed version of 'Cheer Up Jon': guests so far have included the founder of Pets As Therapy, a British charity which uses pets to aid those in need.

The Podjoke, a feature present only in the podcast of the show. It takes the form of a gag, usually pun-based, which is begun in the intro at the beginning of the show, and completed in the outro.

Pitcher's Pictures, Comedian Al Pitcher, while collecting pictures for a piece in his new stand-up set, began e-mailing the pictures to Jon. These pictures were put on the 6 Music website. This became a feature where listeners were challenged to take a better picture than Pitcher each week. The picture has to adhere to a category that is chosen by Pitcher. The category must be based on a song title. The winner is decided by Jon some weeks and by listener votes on other weeks. After the feature each week the song which the category is created from is played.

The Project, a project announced on the podcast in which the Jon asks the podcast listeners (by over-clicking subscribe) to ruin the iTunes podcast chart, and propel Jon to the top. It was begun by a listener, that discovered that by clicking on the subscribe button next to the podcast on iTunes many times it was possible to cheat the podcast chart system and work Jon up near to the top of the charts. This became a popular idea, with many listeners following James's footsteps, however, after some doubting emails, Jon became skeptical on if it really worked, and eventually called for listeners to abandon the project.

In 2009, the first hour of the show has been designated the Happy Hour where Jon tries to be happy (as he generally considers himself to be pessimistic). Listeners have a chance to email in stories of happiness to share with Jon, his team and other listeners. The happy hour is more frequently used to discuss listener's 'good deeds', in which Jon and his guest compare the deeds and decide which is the best - the show is then dedicated to this listener. Winners of this have included a group of friends holding a picnic for a friend's birthday, a lady who taught someone how to use a Dyson Airblade, and on one occasion, Jon himself (He picked up a man's train ticket and was thanked with the reply, "You have saved my life" which he took quite literally). Jon plays songs that will make himself and the listeners happy. Naturally, just minutes after the Happy Hour, Jon reverts to his usual self. On 1 February 2009, Jon was in a bad mood and decided to do 'Crappy Hour' instead of Happy Hour which consisted of anecdotes from both Jon and the listeners about bad things that had happened to them during their weeks.

=== Matt Forde features ===
The Fordie Files are a series of reports by Fordie, which have delved into topics such as Halloween, chivalry, advent, the art of taking a penalty, and cloning (in which Forde put across a compelling argument about why we shouldn't bring back any extinct animal with "wild" in its name). Whilst presenting his reports, Jon often plays random sound effects, that are often unrelated, and off-putting for Fordie.

Get Fordie fit (sometimes referred to as "Get Fit Fatty" to the annoyance of Fordie), charts Fordies journey of losing weight. The main goal of this feature was for Fordie to lose a certain amount of weight before Christmas, and as an incentive, it was agreed he would only receive a Christmas present from Jon if this was achieved. This feature no longer appears on the show.

Fordie's One Week Feature, Fordie creates a feature that will only be done for one show and will never appear again, usually because the feature is a weak attempt at a feature. An example of a one-week feature was "Inside Fordie's Car" where sound effects were played to recreate Fordie driving his car. The feature was filled with silences between Fordie saying phrases such as "Ahh, McDonald's is closed again, I'm starving." and "You're driving like an idiot! Not you." which led to awkward laughter from Jon and much criticism of the feature which Fordie had hoped would become a weekly occurrence on the show.

Challenge Fordie Listeners text or email in challenges for Fordie, previous ones have included to climb Arthur's Seat (Mountain in Edinburgh), To complete a session of Cardiokick (exercise class) and get either live on air or a recorded message from Barack Obama, Joe Biden, Sarah Palin or John McCain.

Fordie's Advice In this feature Fordie gives listeners tips on how to behave in certain situations, such as how to behave with the opposite gender, and how to behave at a party. During his advice for the latter, he insisted that filling a wine bottle with water and proceeding to 'accidentally' drop it on the door step of the party host was a successful way to get out of not bringing a present, whilst looking as if you had.

Fordie Tries To Join The Gym Each week Fordie tries to join the gym in preparation for his marathon attempt, and then has to answer to Richardson and give some lame excuse as to why he has failed.

Fordie's Interviews Each week, Fordie pretends to interview a famous person, yet actually uses soundbites from old interviews and fills in his part himself. He has 'interviewed' Gordon Brown, David Cameron, David Attenborough, the England football team, and even Jon.

== Guest comedian ==
Every week, Jon Richardson invited a guest comedian to join him in the studio.

Some of guest comedians appeared on the show were: Stephen K Amos, Jarred Christmas, Arnab Chanda (who announced his retirement from comedy while on the show), Rufus Hound, Josie Long, Michael McIntyre, Sarah Millican, Lloyd Langford, Dan Atkinson, Al Pitcher, Rich Hall (AKA Otis Lee Crenshaw), Paul Sinha, Andrew Bird, John (Nobbler) Robins, Seann Walsh, Toni and the Guys, Mark Olver, Hal Cruttenden, Will Smith, Dan Evans, Tom Wrigglesworth, Andy Zaltzman, Pappy's Fun Club, Rhod Gilbert, Danny Buckler, Rob Deering, Richard Herring, Tim Vine, Charlie Baker, Matthew Crosby, Sean Lock, Andy Parsons and David O'Doherty.
