= Jon Richardson: Ultimate Worrier =

- Genre: Comedy
- Directed by: Toby Baker
- Presented by: Jon Richardson
- Starring: Richard Gadd (series 1); Mae Martin (series 1); Rose Matafeo (series 1)
- Country of origin: United Kingdom
- Original language: English
- No. of series: 2
- No. of episodes: 18

Production
- Executive producers: Jono Richards; Kate Edmunds; Iain Coyle; Joe McVey
- Producer: David Maguire
- Editors: Michael Marden; Philip Lepherd
- Running time: 60 minutes (inc. adverts)
- Production company: Talkback

Original release
- Network: Dave
- Release: 16 May 2018 – 4 September 2019

Jon Richardson: Ultimate Worrier is a British panel show broadcast on Dave. The first series premiered on 16 May 2018. In the show Jon Richardson and the panel talk about and rank worries in order of severity in the Worry Index. Worries are categorised as either a low, moderate or severe worry. The first series also features sketches in which Rose Matafeo and Richard Gadd research topics Richardson is worried about. A second series of ten episodes ran from 3 July to 4 September 2019.

== Production ==
The show was announced by Dave on 23 January 2018. A clip of the show was released by Digital Spy on 27 April. A video listing Richardson's "top 8 worries" was released on 2 May. The first series of eight hour-long episodes aired from 16 May to 4 July.

Jon Richardson has obsessive–compulsive personality disorder, which he previously discussed in his first Edinburgh Festival Fringe show in 2007. Richardson said that making the show allowed him to "compartmentalise" and was "so cathartic", describing comedy as "a great way to have those conversations but trying to make people feel better". He tells Radio Times that he wants viewers to realise "the world is fundamentally a funny place".

In December 2018, it was announced that the show had been renewed for a second series of ten episodes, to be filmed and broadcast in 2019. The second series began on 3 July 2019 and consisted of 10 episodes. A censored version of the first episode was mistakenly broadcast when it first premiered, despite its timeslot of 10 p.m., one hour after the watershed ended.

Discussing the second series, Richardson said that it was more topical than the first series; he said the show's format allowed quick changes from "lighter" topics to "big news stories", such as climate change, which he described as "the biggest [worry] of all". His wife Lucy Beaumont features as a guest in multiple episodes. Though Richardson was initially reluctant to work with Beaumont, he said "we gradually did a few bits together and it just seemed to come really easily".

== Episodes ==
Series	Episodes	Originally released	
Series	Episodes	First released	Last released
1	8	16 May 2018	4 July 2018
2	10	3 July 2019	4 September 2019

=== Series 1 (2018) ===
No. overall	No. in series	Title	Guests	Original release date	UK Viewers (Note: Viewers across the first 28 days of broadcast on TV, PC/laptop, tablet or smartphone are counted. Pre-transmission figures are included.)
1	1	"The Home"	Josh Widdicombe and Suzi Ruffell	16 May 2018	660,000
2	2	"The Body"	Sara Pascoe and Joe Wilkinson	23 May 2018	523,000
3	3	"Food"	Victoria Coren Mitchell and Rob Beckett	30 May 2018	420,000
4	4	"Humanity"	Nish Kumar and Desiree Burch	6 June 2018	365,000
5	5	"Jon Richardson"	Lucy Beaumont and Jonathan Ross	13 June 2018	N/A (Note: No data reported for the week for Dave)
6	6	"Technology"	James Acaster and David O'Doherty	20 June 2018	300,000
7	7	"Travel"	Romesh Ranganathan and Kerry Godliman	27 June 2018	285,000
8	8	"Family"	Jack Dee and Ivo Graham	4 July 2018	N/A (<211,000) (Note: Not reported in the weekly top 10 programmes for Dave)

=== Series 2 (2019) ===
No. overall	No. in series	Title	Guests	Original release date	UK Viewers
9	1	"The Self"	Lucy Beaumont, Kiri Pritchard-McLean and Joe Wilkinson	3 July 2019	457,000
10	2	"Modern Living"	Jessie Cave, Darren Harriott and Richard Osman	10 July 2019	326,000
11	3	"Leisure Time"	Lucy Beaumont, Roisin Conaty and Russell Howard	17 July 2019	358,000
12	4	"Health"	Rob Beckett, Ed Gamble and Lou Sanders	24 July 2019	361,000
13	5	"Consumerism"	Angela Barnes, Lucy Beaumont and Jamali Maddix	31 July 2019	374,000
14	6	"People"	John Robins, Holly Walsh and Josh Widdicombe	7 August 2019	381,000
15	7	"The Future"	Lolly Adefope, Matt Forde and Morgana Robinson	14 August 2019	294,000
16	8	"Global Affairs"	Catherine Bohart, Sara Pascoe and Phil Wang	21 August 2019	364,000
17	9	"Holidays"	Tom Allen, Matt Forde and Rosie Jones	28 August 2019	267,000
18	10	"Planet Earth"	James Acaster, Rebecca Front and Ivo Graham	4 September 2019	331,000

== Reception ==
Steve Bennett of Chortle compares the show to Room 101, but notes that Richardson "puts a more distinctive spin on the format", commenting on the rarity of a panel show being "so closely moulded to the foibles of its host". Bennett criticises that the show "should really be a 30-minute format", but summarises it as an "entertaining passer of time". In a three-star review for The Times, Carol Midgley also criticises that "[s]ome parts went on too long", though also calling other parts "nerdishly amusing". Oprah Flash of Cable recommends the show to people who have "enjoyed the dry wit [Richardson] brings to 8 Out of 10 Cats".
