= Crims =

- Genre: Sitcom
- Created by: Dan Swimer; Adam Kay
- Theme music composer: The Correspondents
- Opening theme: Fear & Delight
- Country of origin: United Kingdom
- Original language: English
- No. of series: 1
- No. of episodes: 6

Production
- Running time: 30 minutes

Original release
- Network: BBC Three
- Release: 8 January – 12 February 2015

Crims is a British television sitcom created by Dan Swimer and Adam Kay. It centres on two men sent to a young offenders' institution after one of them involves the unaware other in a bank robbery. It was screened in early 2015 on BBC Three. In May 2015, the BBC confirmed the show would not be renewed.

== Cast and characters ==
- Elis James as Luke
- Kadiff Kirwan as Jason
- Lashana Lynch as Gemma, Jason's sister and Luke's girlfriend
- Cariad Lloyd as Dawn, an officer at the institution
- Ricky Champ as Creg, an officer at the institution
- Theo Barklem-Biggs as Marcel, a fellow young offender
- Tracy-Ann Oberman as Governor Riley

== Cultural references ==
On the radio show and podcast Elis James hosts with comedian John Robins, James' starring role in Crims became a running gag, with Robins heavily implying that Crims was of poor quality, and pretending to believe that it was called 'Crimes', while mocking the fact that James, despite portraying a teenager, was 34 at the time of Crims' broadcast.
