= Meet the Richardsons =

British comedy television series

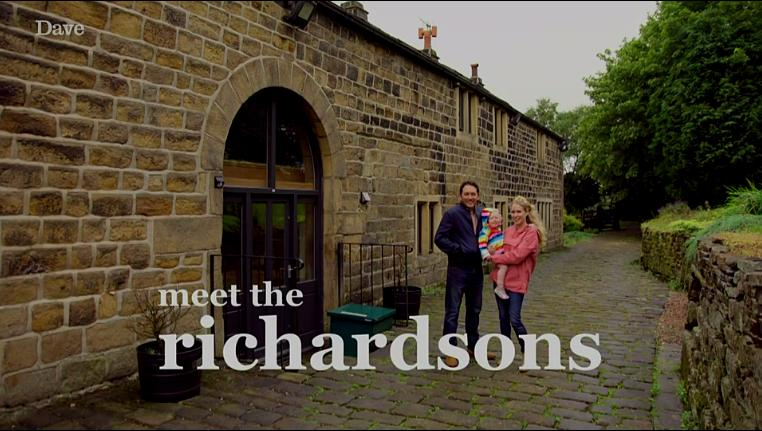
- Genre: Mockumentary
- Written by: Lucy Beaumont; Tim Reid
- Directed by: Lee Hupfield; Eddie Stafford
- Starring: Jon Richardson; Lucy Beaumont; Michelle Austin; Damion Priestley; Emma Priestley; Billy Hinchcliff
- Country of origin: United Kingdom
- Original language: English
- No. of series: 5
- No. of episodes: 47

Production
- Executive producers: Sohail Shah; Paul Sandler; Iain Coyle
- Producers: Lee Hupfield; Eddie Stafford
- Production locations: England, Hebden Bridge, dock10 studios
- Editors: Jason Boxall; Phil Lepherd
- Running time: 28 minutes
- Production companies: King of Sunshine Productions; Second Act Productions

Original release
- Network: Dave
- Release: 27 February 2020 – 21 December 2024

Meet the Richardsons is a British comedy television series that premiered on 27 February 2020, on Dave. It stars comedians Jon Richardson and Lucy Beaumont as fictionalised versions of themselves discussing their lives in a mockumentary format. Various comedians and celebrities make appearances, usually also as fictionalised versions of themselves.

In August 2020, it was announced an 8-episode second series would screen in 2021, with two Christmas specials broadcast in December 2020. A third series began broadcasting in March 2022. In May 2022, a further two series were commissioned, with the announcement that Manchester based company King of Sunshine Productions would be the new television company responsible for making the show. The fourth series began broadcasting on 6 April 2023, with all episodes available to stream on UKTV Play on the day of release. The fifth series began broadcasting on 8 April 2024, with all episodes available to stream on UKTV Play on the day of release.

== Cast and characters ==
=== Main characters ===
- Jon Richardson as himself
- Lucy Beaumont as herself
- Elsie Richardson, Jon and Lucy's daughter, is played by an uncredited child actor
- Michele Austin as Dani Julian, Jon's agent
- Damion Priestley as Damion, Jon and Lucy's neighbour
- Emma Priestley as Emma, Jon and Lucy's neighbour
- Thomas Priestley as Thomas, Damion and Emma's son

=== Recurring and guest characters ===
- Gill Adams as herself (Lucy's mother)
- Amanda Abbington as herself
- Alexander Armstrong as himself
- Dane Baptiste as himself
- Rob Beckett as himself
- Kemah Bob as herself
- Marcus Brigstocke as himself
- Alex Brooker as himself
- Beverley Callard as herself
- Alan Carr as himself
- Craig Charles as himself
- Adrian Chiles as himself
- Bernie Clifton as himself
- Julian Clary as himself
- Janice Connolly as herself / Mrs Barbara Nice
- Brian Cox as himself
- Jack Dee as himself
- Susie Dent as herself
- Jason Donovan as himself
- Anton Du Beke as himself
- Hugh Fearnley-Whittingstall as himself
- Matt Forde as himself
- Sarah Greene as herself
- Graeme Hawley as Bob / himself
- Nigel Havers as himself
- Richard Herring as himself
- Derek Horsham as Andy
- Russell Howard as himself
- Rosie Jones as herself
- Chris Kamara as himself
- Russell Kane as himself
- Kerry Katona as herself
- Jessica Knappett as herself
- Mark Lawson as himself
- Sally Lindsay as herself
- Gabby Logan as herself
- Tim Lovejoy as himself
- Zoe Lyons as herself
- Melinda Messenger as herself / Lucy Beaumont
- Kevin McCloud as himself
- Justin Moorhouse as himself
- Rachel Parris as herself
- Joe Pasquale as himself
- Steve Pemberton as himself
- Sally Phillips as herself
- Tim Reid as himself
- Jonathan Ross as himself
- Katherine Ryan as herself
- Ben Shephard as himself
- Kellie Shirley as Jean / herself
- David Tennant as himself
- Georgia Tennant as herself
- Johnny Vegas as himself
- Dan Walker as himself
- Gregg Wallace as himself
- Seann Walsh as himself
- Kimberly Wyatt as herself
- Alex Zane as himself

== Episodes ==
=== Series 1 (2020) ===
No. overall	No. in series	Title	Directed by	Written by	Original release date
1	1	Episode 1	Lee Hupfield & Eddie Stafford	Lucy Beaumont & Tim Reid	27 February 2020
Lucy wants Jon to appear on All Star Mr & Mrs with Rob Beckett, but Jon is still annoyed that Rob replaced him on 8 Out of 10 Cats. Lucy stages a huge birthday party for their daughter.
2	2	Episode 2	Lee Hupfield & Eddie Stafford	Lucy Beaumont & Tim Reid	5 March 2020
Jon appears on 8 Out of 10 Cats Does Countdown alongside his hero Jack Dee who gives him some career advice. Lucy secretly signs Jon up to judge the World Dock Pudding competition in Hebden Bridge. Lucy finds evidence Jon is having an affair.
3	3	Episode 3	Lee Hupfield & Eddie Stafford	Lucy Beaumont & Tim Reid	12 March 2020
Lucy goes out on the town in London with Alan Carr. Jon has a night out with best mate Matt Forde. Lucy makes Jon take a yoga lesson. Jon takes his revenge on a bad driver by posting a poison pen letter.
4	4	Episode 4	Lee Hupfield & Eddie Stafford	Lucy Beaumont & Tim Reid	19 March 2020
The Richardsons finally get invited to the showbiz event of the year. Lucy's excited to meet Jason Donovan at the party, but she's not as excited as Jon who has an audition to be a voice in a Pixar film - his lifelong dream.
5	5	Episode 5	Lee Hupfield & Eddie Stafford	Lucy Beaumont & Tim Reid	26 March 2020
Chris Kamara asks Jon to take part in a Leeds United fundraiser for deprived children. Jon's against celebrity endorsement, but the Leeds connection makes him agree. Lucy tries to enrol Elsie in a private school - against Jon's wishes.
6	6	Episode 6	Lee Hupfield & Eddie Stafford	Lucy Beaumont & Tim Reid	2 April 2020
Lucy's sitcom, Wet Cloth/Dry Cloth, is ready for a BBC run-through with Johnny Vegas as one of its stars. Jon hates the script, but everyone else disagrees. Jon's not bothered, as his Pixar film role is almost in the bag.

=== 2020 Christmas Specials ===
No. overall	No. in series	Title	Directed by	Written by	Original release date
7	1	At Christmas - Episode 1	Lee Hupfield & Eddie Stafford	Lucy Beaumont & Tim Reid	9 December 2020
Jon wants to give daughter Elsie the perfect vegan Christmas, but Lucy has invited her mother Gill and Johnny Vegas over for the festivities.
8	2	At Christmas - Episode 2	Lee Hupfield & Eddie Stafford	Lucy Beaumont & Tim Reid	16 December 2020
More celebs turn up, which is perfect for Lucy's panto. Did Lucy get so drunk she invited Jason Donovan over? And will Johnny Vegas be Jon and Lucy's new stepfather?

=== Series 2 (2021) ===
No. overall	No. in series	Title	Directed by	Written by	Original release date
9	1	Episode 1	Lee Hupfield & Eddie Stafford	Lucy Beaumont & Tim Reid	8 April 2021
The couple begin to embrace their new life in lockdown. Jon spends his time in a pub in his converted garage, whilst Lucy gets in touch with an old flame as she begins work on a new project.
10	2	Episode 2	Lee Hupfield & Eddie Stafford	Lucy Beaumont & Tim Reid	15 April 2021
Sally Phillips works with Jon on his dream project - a documentary about Jake Thackray. Meanwhile, Lucy attempts to reignite the passion in her marriage and gets advice from her mother.
11	3	Episode 3	Lee Hupfield & Eddie Stafford	Lucy Beaumont & Tim Reid	22 April 2021
Jon and Lucy throw a wedding anniversary party. Lucy manages to insult Sally Phillips and Jon gets someone fired from his local garden centre.
12	4	Episode 4	Lee Hupfield & Eddie Stafford	Lucy Beaumont & Tim Reid	29 April 2021
Jon manages to wreck the family home while Lucy starts a new project with Rob Beckett. Sally Phillips tries to help the Richardsons to inject some much needed passion into their sex lives.
13	5	Episode 5	Lee Hupfield & Eddie Stafford	Lucy Beaumont & Tim Reid	6 May 2021
Jon tries to sell the house to Kevin McCloud, while Lucy and her Mum Gill return to Hull to make a documentary about aliens for Brian Cox. Russell Howard reveals all about Jon's drug use.
14	6	Episode 6	Lee Hupfield & Eddie Stafford	Lucy Beaumont & Tim Reid	13 May 2021
After a gig with Dane Baptiste, Jon tries to meet his all-time hero, the football manager Marcelo Bielsa. Alex Brooker visits Jon's pub and Lucy and her Mum film a new TV show with Mrs Barbara Nice.
15	7	Episode 7	Lee Hupfield & Eddie Stafford	Lucy Beaumont & Tim Reid	20 May 2021
Craig Charles comes around because he fancies buying a house with a pub. Jessica Knappett pulls out of Lucy's sitcom and director Johnny Vegas has an idea of who could replace her.
16	8	Episode 8	Lee Hupfield & Eddie Stafford	Lucy Beaumont & Tim Reid	27 May 2021
It's Jon's birthday and despite his predictable nature Lucy has organised a surprise for him. Also, it's time for the recording of Lucy's sitcom with Johnny Vegas. The Richardsons are moving to London.
17	9	Episode 9 special unseen and blooper episode	Lee Hupfield & Eddie Stafford	Lucy Beaumont & Tim Reid	27 May 2021
Featuring some unseen arguments, hilarious bloopers and some new confessions from the season.

=== Series 3 (2022) ===
No. overall	No. in series	Title	Directed by	Written by	Original release date
18	1	Episode 1	Lee Hupfield & Eddie Stafford	Lucy Beaumont & Tim Reid	3 March 2022
Jon and Lucy give us a glimpse at their new home - while Lucy does her best to impress their new neighbours, Jon has his eye on an old and unloved pub.
19	2	Episode 2	Lee Hupfield & Eddie Stafford	Lucy Beaumont & Tim Reid	10 March 2022
Jon and Lucy get to know their new neighbours, Lucy sees a PTA raffle as her chance to make a good impression, and old neighbours Emma and Damion pay a visit.
20	3	Episode 3	Lee Hupfield & Eddie Stafford	Lucy Beaumont & Tim Reid	17 March 2022
Jon and Lucy agree to hamster-sit for the neighbours, Jon tries out new stand-up material, and Lucy uses a corporate gig as a chance to stage a protest against the fossil fuel industry.
21	4	Episode 4	Lee Hupfield & Eddie Stafford	Lucy Beaumont & Tim Reid	24 March 2022
Lucy jets off to LA to launch her Hollywood career - leaving Jon on his own with a plan to prank his best mate Matt Forde - and a potentially career-defining audition with a genuine TV legend.
22	5	Episode 5	Lee Hupfield & Eddie Stafford	Lucy Beaumont & Tim Reid	31 March 2022
Jon tries to organise Johnny Vegas' stag do in a brewery, Lucy tours the bookshops to promote her new 'Mumoir', and the couple come up against a ruthless opponent on a game show.
23	6	Episode 6	Lee Hupfield & Eddie Stafford	Lucy Beaumont & Tim Reid	7 April 2022
Jon kicks off his serious acting career by landing a role in Line of Duty, and Lucy discovers another celebrity's 'Mumoir' and gets offered the chance to appear in The Masked Singer.
24	7	Episode 7	Lee Hupfield & Eddie Stafford	Lucy Beaumont & Tim Reid	14 April 2022
Jon decides to start saying yes to any old rubbish TV show, and he and Lucy host a brand-new Channel 4 panel show before helping Gill and Johnny Vegas find the perfect wedding venue.
25	8	Episode 8	Lee Hupfield & Eddie Stafford	Lucy Beaumont & Tim Reid	21 April 2022
It's Gill and Johnny Vegas's wedding day, Lucy finds out that she's got a famous relative, and Jon and Lucy finally uncover the celebrity couple ripping this show off.
26	9	Episode 9	Lee Hupfield & Eddie Stafford	Lucy Beaumont & Tim Reid	21 July 2022
Jon and Lucy are asked to make a UK travel show with Sally Lindsay - they jump in an RV, visit Whitby, and sample the food and legends of the area in the hope of winning a BAFTA.
27	10	Episode 10	Lee Hupfield & Eddie Stafford	Lucy Beaumont & Tim Reid	28 July 2022
Jon and Lucy are off to Blackpool to make the second half of their TV travel show with Sally Lindsay - Jon's excited about it, but Lucy's worried about his star billing being lost.

=== Series 4 (2023) ===
No. overall	No. in series	Title	Directed by	Written by	Original release date
28	1	Episode 1	Lee Hupfield & Eddie Stafford	Lucy Beaumont & Tim Reid	6 April 2023
Jon is having a midlife crisis and wants to get a tattoo, and Lucy gets career advice from Katherine Ryan.
29	2	Episode 2	Lee Hupfield & Eddie Stafford	Lucy Beaumont & Tim Reid	6 April 2023
Lucy plans an all-female sketch show, and Jon meets Richard Herring to discuss a possible partnership.
30	3	Episode 3	Lee Hupfield & Eddie Stafford	Lucy Beaumont & Tim Reid	6 April 2023
Lucy tries to up her telly game with quiz show lessons from Russell Kane, and Jon manages to anger Dan Walker.
31	4	Episode 4	Lee Hupfield & Eddie Stafford	Lucy Beaumont & Tim Reid	6 April 2023
Jon gets much-needed life advice from new best friend Adrian Chiles, and Lucy takes part in a pub quiz.
32	5	Episode 5	Lee Hupfield & Eddie Stafford	Lucy Beaumont & Tim Reid	6 April 2023
Jon considers faking his own death, and Lucy encounters a case of cold feet on her sketch show.
33	6	Episode 6	Lee Hupfield & Eddie Stafford	Lucy Beaumont & Tim Reid	6 April 2023
Lucy's offered the chance to do Strictly and meets Anton Du Beke for a taster, but when Jon catches up with Seann Walsh, he is desperate not to trigger Seann by mentioning that show.
34	7	Episode 7	Lee Hupfield & Eddie Stafford	Lucy Beaumont & Tim Reid	6 April 2023
Jon and Lucy find out what real love looks like at dinner with Marcus Brigstocke and Rachel Parris.
35	8	Episode 8	Lee Hupfield & Eddie Stafford	Lucy Beaumont & Tim Reid	6 April 2023
It's Jon's 40th birthday and Lucy has loads of surprises planned... will Jon finally get his tattoo?
36	9	Episode 9	Lee Hupfield & Eddie Stafford	Lucy Beaumont & Tim Reid	6 April 2023
Jon and Lucy are making a Halloween special... but Dave actually want TV legend Sarah Greene to present it.
37	10	Episode 10	Lee Hupfield & Eddie Stafford	Lucy Beaumont & Tim Reid	6 April 2023
Meet the outtakes episode as the real Jon and Lucy go behind the scenes to reveal what didn't make the cut.

=== Series 5 (2024) ===
No. overall	No. in series	Title	Directed by	Written by	Original release date
38	1	Episode 1	Lee Hupfield & Eddie Stafford	Lucy Beaumont & Tim Reid	8 April 2024
Lucy breaks into the big time after her BAFTA nomination. UKTV want a proper A-list comedy name on the show this series and they're ready to splash the cash, but Jon has other ideas.
39	2	Episode 2	Lee Hupfield & Eddie Stafford	Lucy Beaumont & Tim Reid	8 April 2024
Lucy's having a nightmare on The Great British Bake Off, and her cake is being reported as the worst ever on the show.
40	3	Episode 3	Lee Hupfield & Eddie Stafford	Lucy Beaumont & Tim Reid	8 April 2024
Lucy makes her mark on Taskmaster and discovers a darker side to fellow contestant Julian Clary. Jon decides to sell out and finds out what it would take to host a lucrative daytime quiz show like Tipping Point with Ben Shephard. Lucy's excited to be invited to a meeting at gritty drama production company, Warp, but is annoyed when Jon jumps on her bandwagon and tells them he's writing a gritty script too.
41	4	Episode 4	Lee Hupfield & Eddie Stafford	Lucy Beaumont & Tim Reid	8 April 2024
Jon goes into business with old friend Adrian Chiles in a bid to save grassroots football from Hollywood, and Lucy struggles to keep up with new neighbour Kimberly Wyatt.
42	5	Episode 5	Lee Hupfield & Eddie Stafford	Lucy Beaumont & Tim Reid	8 April 2024
Jon does a daytime quiz show with Kemah Bob and upsets Alexander Armstrong, and Lucy shows journalist Mark Lawson her typically perfect day for a newspaper feature.
43	6	Episode 6	Lee Hupfield & Eddie Stafford	Lucy Beaumont & Tim Reid	8 April 2024
Jon buys a field to save the planet by filling it with trees, and Lucy discovers that she has a social media whistleblower in her circle and sets out to uncover the leak.
44	7	Episode 7	Lee Hupfield & Eddie Stafford	Lucy Beaumont & Tim Reid	8 April 2024
Jon and Lucy's projects get busy as Jon films the pilot episode of his new daytime quiz show with Kemah Bob and Lucy makes a gritty gangland film with Amanda Abbington.
45	8	Episode 8	Lee Hupfield & Eddie Stafford	Lucy Beaumont & Tim Reid	8 April 2024
Jon and Lucy come up with the perfect ending for the series, but Lucy's 40th birthday party goes sour when she lets slip that this might be the last-ever episode.
46	9	Episode 9	Lee Hupfield & Eddie Stafford	Lucy Beaumont & Tim Reid	21 December 2024
Jon and Lucy look back on five years of the programme and go behind the scenes with the help of celebrity fans in this special episode.
47	10	Episode 10	Lee Hupfield & Eddie Stafford	Lucy Beaumont & Tim Reid	21 December 2024
Legendary bloopers show host Wallace Carmichael guides us through hilarious moans and mistakes in this outtakes episode.

== Production ==
=== Series 2 ===
In August 2020, Dave commissioned a second series of the show plus two Christmas specials to be broadcast at the end of 2020.

=== Series 3 ===
In June 2023, Jon Richardson, Adrian Chiles, and Matt Forde were made honorary members of Sheffield F.C. after visiting the club to film for the series.

== Reception ==
=== Awards and nominations ===
Year	Award	Category	Recipients	Result	Ref
2023	British Academy Television Awards	Best Female Performance in a Comedy Programme	Lucy Beaumont	Nominated	
