= To Hull and Back =

To Hull and Back may refer to:

- "To Hull and Back", a 1985 episode of Only Fools and Horses
- To Hull and Back, a radio show hosted by Lucy Beaumont
