= Arnab Chanda =

British actor, writer and producer

Arnab Chanda is a British writer and director.

== Career ==
He was born in England in Pontefract, but left at age 6 and grew up in Saudi Arabia and the US. After graduating from the University of North Carolina at Chapel Hill, he started doing stand-up comedy in New York City. He moved to London and won the Jongleurs New Act Competition, the Amused Moose Comedy Awards, and was nominated for Best Newcomer in the 2007 British Chortle Awards. He stopped performing stand-up in 2010.

=== Performances ===
He has performed stand up on the Comedy Central UK shows The World Stands Up in 2007, Edinburgh & Beyond in 2007, and the Comedy Store in 2008, Russell Howard's Good News (BBC Three, Series 2, 2010), The Stephen K Amos Show (BBC Two, Series 1, 2010), and Chris Moyles' Comedy Empire (BBC Three, 2012) . He has also appeared on The Jon Richardson Show (BBC 6 Music), The Comedy Cafe with Janice Forsyth (BBC Scotland), Out to Lunch (BBC Radio 2), 28 Acts in 28 Minutes (BBC Radio 4), and "Many Questions" (The Guardian Unlimited Podcast).

His live performances include the Edinburgh Festival in 2006 in "The Comedy Bucket" (with Matthew Crosby, Joe Wilkinson, Al Stick, and Dave Nichols), "Tickets Still Available" with Greg McHugh (Edinburgh Festival, 2007), Rich Fulcher's "Tiny Acts of Rebellion" (Edinburgh Festival, 2011), the Mighty Boosh Festival in 2008, the Latitude Festival in 2007 and 2008, the Leeds Festival in 2008, The Big Chill Festival in 2008. He was the tour support act for Simon Amstell from 2007 to 2009, as well as Stephen Merchant in 2008.

== Acting ==
His credits include Raj Puri in the ITV2 series Trinity, Edward in the BAFTA nominated independent film Black Pond (2011), Ned in Julia Davis's Hunderby (Sky Atlantic, 2012), Danny Bullet in series 2 of Noel Fielding's Luxury Comedy (2014), Kris in Series 1 of Dan Clark's How Not to Live Your Life on BBC Three, and was a writer/performer in Comedy Cuts (ITV2, Season 3), Splitting Cells (BBC Three), and co-wrote and acted in the short film Old Sea Dog (London Short Film Festival, 2012). In 2017, he played the part of "Master Don" in the music video "Steambreather" in the album Emperor of Sand by the band Mastodon, produced by production company Blink. In 2018, he has been the voice of Chuck for the YouTube show, Angry Birds on the Run.

== Writing ==
He was a staff writer for the MTV Europe Music Awards (MTV Int'l, 2010), the BAFTA nominated BBC2 show Never Mind the Buzzcocks (Series 22, 2008), the MTV show "Celebrity Bites" (Co-Head Writer, Series 1, 2010), and has written for Dan Clark's How Not to Live Your Life (BBC Three, Series 2 (2009) and 3 (2010)), "Comedy Cuts" (ITV2, Series 3), and "Splitting Cells" (BBC Three). He was nominated for a 2018 Writers Guild Award for "Best Online Comedy", for his web series "Three Cool Days". He has also been a guest columnist for The Guardian.

== Producing ==
He was a Producer at BBC Radio Comedy between 2013 and 2016, making Radio 4 series for John Kearns, Liam Williams, Alex Edelman, as well as series 10 and 11 of NewsJack, and series 10 of Chain Reaction.
