= Jon Richardson Grows Up =

- Genre: Documentary
- Presented by: Jon Richardson
- Country of origin: United Kingdom
- Original language: English
- No. of series: 1
- No. of episodes: 3 (list of episodes)

Original release
- Network: Channel 4
- Release: 15 September – 29 September 2014

Jon Richardson Grows Up is a three-part, 2014 documentary series for Channel 4 in which comedians Jon Richardson and Matt Forde examine modern aspects of becoming an adult. The first episode, dealing with relationships, was broadcast on 15 September. The other two episodes, about money, and children, were broadcast the following two Mondays.

== Episode list ==
- Episode 1: Relationships

Air date: 15 September

- Episode 2: Money

Air date: 22 September

- Episode 3: Children

Air date: 29 September
