= Mark Olver =

Mark Olver may refer to:

- Mark Olver (comedian) (born 1975), English stand-up comedian
- Mark Olver (ice hockey) (born 1988), Canadian-German ice hockey player
