= List of Russell Howard & Mum: Road Trip episodes =

The following is a list of Russell Howard & Mum episodes featuring British stand up Russell Howard and his mum. The series was commissioned in April 2016. The first episode was broadcast on Comedy Central on 19 October 2016. A second series began on 26 March 2018.

== Episodes ==
=== Series 1 (2016) ===
No. overall	No. in series	Title	Original release date
1	1	"Alien Hunting in Nevada"	19 October 2016
Howard and his mum search for alien life, they're heading to the UFO capital of the USA: Nevada. They join an abductee support group and venture out to a UFO hot spot.
2	2	"Survival Prepping in Utah"	26 October 2016
Howard and his mum visited Utah to meet and train with the Survival Preppers. They were made up as action heroes, capable of facing a zombie apocalypse.
3	3	"Hip Hopping in Atlanta"	2 November 2016
Howard and his mum ventured south to the Hip Hop capital of the USA: Atlanta. Under the guidance of Dr Dax, they attempt to master the four elements of Hip Hop.
4	4	"Ghost Hunting in Savannah"	9 November 2016
Howard and his mum visited one of the USA's most haunted cities: Savannah, Georgia. During their stay, the Howards investigated various paranormal activities.
5	5	"Hot-Rodding at the Demolition Derby (South Carolina)"	16 November 2016
Howard and his mum were in South Carolina where they joined the Knights of Destruction, an All-American Demolition Derby.
6	6	"Fabulous Dogs of New York"	23 November 2016
Howard and his mum went to New York, and met pampered pet dogs.

=== Series 2 (2018) ===
No. overall	No. in series	Title	Original release date
7	1	"Going to Pot in Portland"	26 March 2018
Russell and his mum head to Portland, Oregon where cannabis is legal to use recreationally. As their trip literally goes to pot, will Ninette have a go on the demon weed?
8	2	"Beauty Pageanting in Vegas"	2 April 2018
Russell and his mum arrive in Las Vegas to help judge the legendary Mrs. Globe Beauty Pageant. However, Russell must first understand what it takes to be a beauty queen.
9	3	"Rocking Out in LA"	9 April 2018
Russell and his mum are in Los Angeles and they are ready to rock. They will have 48 hours at the Rock and Roll Fantasy Camp to become full blown guitar heroes and perform in Hollywood.
10	4	"Cowboy Ranching in Oregon"	16 April 2018
Russell and Ninette's road trip brings them to The Wild West. Their mission is to become real life ranchers.
11	5	"Being Happy in Naples"	23 April 2018
Russell and Ninette arrive Naples in Florida -voted the happiest city in America- and discover the mecca of merriment.
12	6	"Side Showing at the State Fair"	30 April 2018
Russell and his mum visit an All-American State Fair in Indiana to join in the 4th of July celebrations.

=== Series 3 (2019) ===
No. overall	No. in series	Title	Original release date
13	1	"Gap Week in Koh Phangan"	23 January 2019
Russell and his mum Ninette are in Koh Phangan, Thailand to hit the hippy trail. They experience a mass love-in, get wasted on buckets of booze and Russ is encouraged to discuss sex.
14	2	"Ancient Arts in Japan"	30 January 2019
Russell and his mum Ninette go to Japan and learn how to be ninjas. Russell also takes part in sumo wrestling.
15	3	"City of the Future in South Korea"	6 February 2019
Russell and his mum Ninette arrive in Seoul in South Korea where they take control of and corrupt a Mega-Robot.
16	4	"The Road Less Travelled in Vietnam"	13 February 2019
Russell and his mum Ninette arrive in Vietnam and visit the capital of Hanoi, before heading out of town to compete in rural Olympics.
17	5	"Living the Dream in Mumbai"	20 February 2019
Russell and his mum Ninette are in Mumbai, the city of dreams. They get a chance to act! Act! Act! Bollywood style and then share the bedroom secrets with Mumbai's oldest "sexpert"
18	6	"Going Wild in Thailand"	27 February 2019
Russell and his mum arrive in northern Thailand to commune with nature, they take mud bath with elephants, build their own crib and meet a chap who wants them to snog a snake.

=== Series 4 (2019) ===
No. overall	No. in series	Title	Original release date
19	1	"The Road to Enlightenment in India (Pushkar)"	9 October 2019
Russell and his mum go to the Holy City of Pushkar. Their cosmic guide takes them on a journey of enlightenment via a rat temple and the festival of Holi.
20	2	"Conquering K-Pop in South Korea"	16 October 2019
Russell and Ninette go to Seoul and get involved in the music phenomenon of K-Pop.
21	3	"Going Underground in Tokyo"	23 October 2019
Russell and Ninette visit Tokyo where they meet magical maids, renting maids and Russell goes to work at an infamous Host Club.
22	4	"New Year in Thailand"	30 October 2019
Russell and Ninette visit Thailand and sample some of the unusual activities it has to offer.
23	5	"Getting Cultural in Kerala"	6 November 2019
Russell and Ninette immerse themselves in culture in the Indian state of Kerala, where yoga isn't at all relaxing and Ninette has an awkward moment with some oil.
24	6	"Turning 60 in Japan"	13 November 2019
Russell and Ninette celebrate Ninette's 60th birthday in Tokyo by whizzing through her rather unambitious bucket list.

== See also ==
- Jack Whitehall: Travels with My Father
- Bradley Walsh and Son Breaking Dad
