= Banter (radio show) =

BBC Radio 4 show

- Genre: Comedy panel game
- Running time: 30 mins
- Country of origin: United Kingdom
- Language(s): English
- Home station: BBC Radio 4
- Hosted by: Andrew Collins
- Created by: Tim Barber
- Original release: August 2005 – May 2008
- No. of series: 3
- No. of episodes: 18
- Website: Website

Banter is a radio programme that is broadcast on BBC Radio 4 in the United Kingdom, starring Andrew Collins and Richard Herring. The pilot and the first 2 series were broadcast from August 2005 to November 2006, and a third series was broadcast in April and May 2008. There have been 19 half-hour episodes so far. The programme normally takes the form of invited guests naming their "top threes" in a given category.

The series was devised by Tim Barber and is produced for Radio 4 by Avalon. A pilot for a television version under the name of "Rule Of 3" was recorded in October 2011 with Rebecca Front as host and team captains Russell Howard and Chris Addison.

== Guests ==
Apart from Collins and Herring, the other guests for each episode were:

Pilot - Lucy Porter, Russell Howard, Will Smith.

Series 1

- Episode 1 - Will Smith, Russell Howard, Jenny Eclair
- Episode 2 - Will Smith, Simon Day, Lynn Ferguson
- Episode 3 - Russell Howard, Arthur Smith, Natalie Haynes
- Episode 4 - Russell Howard, Sue Perkins, Chris Addison
- Episode 5 - Will Smith, Lynn Ferguson, Dave Gorman
- Episode 6 - Will Smith, Russell Howard, Jenny Éclair

Series 2

- Episode 1 - Russell Howard, Lucy Porter, Arthur Smith
- Episode 2 - Rob Deering, Lynn Ferguson, Russell Howard
- Episode 3 - Barry Cryer, Sue Perkins, Will Smith
- Episode 4 - Russell Howard, Lee Mack, Julia Morris
- Episode 5 - Chris Addison, Natalie Haynes, Will Smith
- Episode 6 - Russell Howard, Will Smith, Lynn Ferguson

Series 3

- Episode 1 - Dave Gorman, Russell Howard, Dillie Keane
- Episode 2 - Jenny Eclair, Russell Howard, Arthur Smith
- Episode 3 - Natalie Haynes, Russell Howard, Will Smith
- Episode 4 - Miranda Hart, Russell Howard, Will Smith
- Episode 5 - Chris Addison, Jenny Eclair, Will Smith
- Episode 6 - Lynn Ferguson, Tim Vine, Will Smith

== Notes and references ==
- Lavalie, John. "Banter" EpGuides, 29 Jul 2005
- Herring, Richard. September News
