= John Robins (comedian) =

English stand-up comedian and presenter (born 1982)

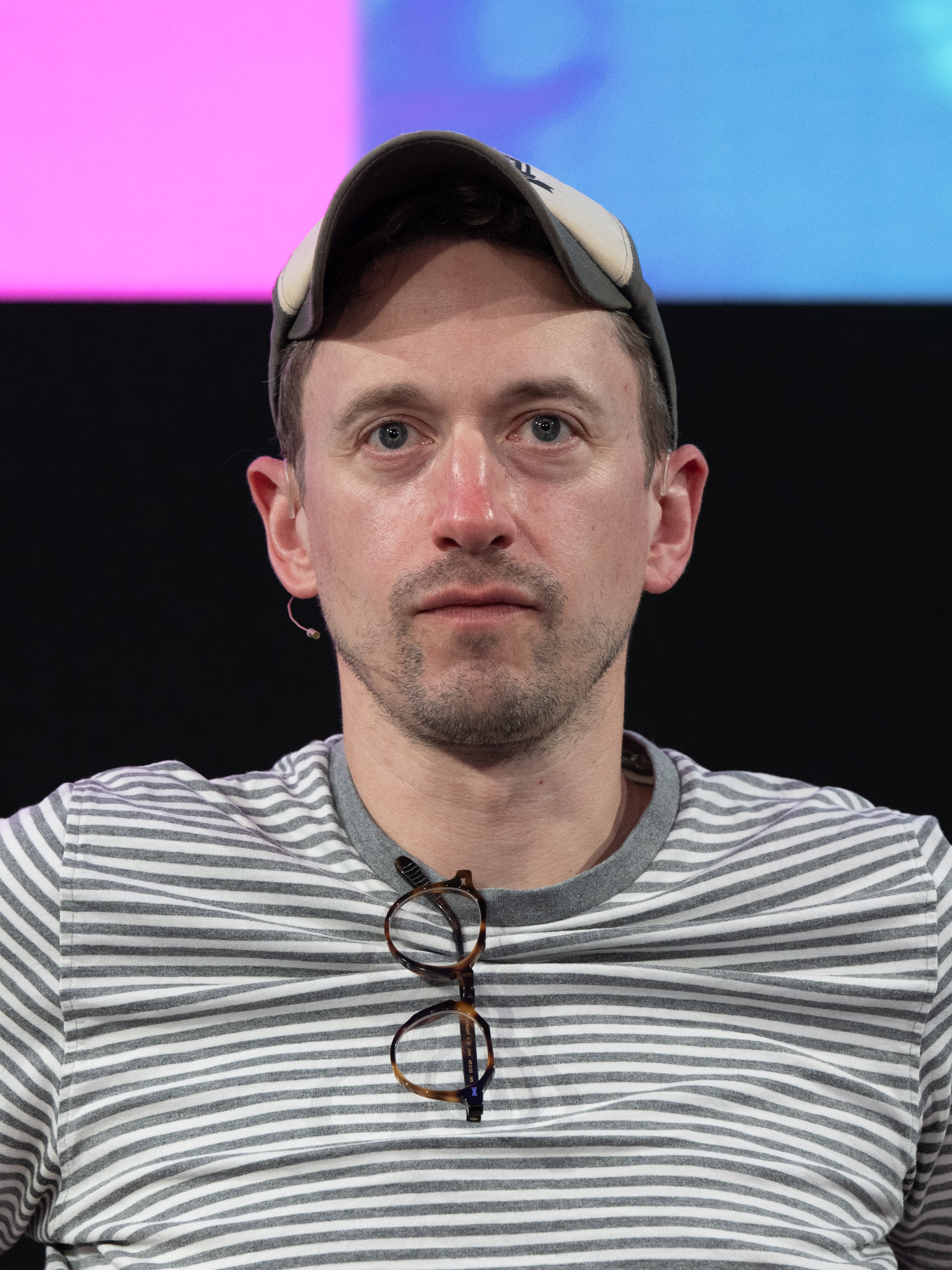
- Robins at SXSW London in June 2026
- Born: John Michael David Robins; 4 May 1982 (age 44); Thornbury, England
- Education: St Anne's College, Oxford

Comedy career
- Years active: 2005–present
- Medium: Radio, stand-up, television
- Genre: Observational comedy
- Website: www.johnrobins.com

John Michael David Robins (born 4 May 1982) is an English stand-up comedian and radio presenter. He is known for co-hosting his radio show and podcast with Elis James on BBC Radio 5 Live, and in 2017 he was joint winner of the Edinburgh Comedy Award.

== Early life ==
Robins was born and grew up in Thornbury, Gloucestershire, and was educated at The Castle School and at St Anne's College, Oxford, where he read English.

After graduating from Oxford, Robins returned to Bristol, where in 2006 he shared a flat with fellow comedians Jon Richardson, Russell Howard and Mark Olver.

== Career ==
Robins began performing comedy in 2005, and reached the semi-finals of the So You Think You're Funny competition at the Edinburgh Festival Fringe. In 2007, he participated in the "Comedy Zone" showcase at the festival.

Robins appeared both as guest and as co-presenter on both The Russell Howard Show and The Jon Richardson Show on BBC Radio 6 Music (2007–2010).

In 2011, Robins performed stand-up on Russell Howard's Good News. On television he has also appeared on Alan Davies: As Yet Untitled (twice, plus the unaired pilot), Live at the Apollo, Mock the Week, Live from the BBC, Celebrity Deal or No Deal with Sarah Millican and on the 2013 Christmas mash-up of 8 Out of 10 Cats and Deal or No Deal.

Robins appeared on several radio programmes, including Matt Forde's Talksport show, BBC Radio 4's Word of Mouth, Great Lives where he spoke about Frank Zappa and BBC Radio Wales's What's the Story?

In February 2014, he started hosting the Elis James and John Robins show on XFM (now Radio X) with fellow comedian Elis James. In August 2014, the show moved to Saturdays, and was broadcast weekly 1-4 pm. It is also a popular podcast with over 12 million downloads as of July 2017.

Robins performed in New Zealand for the first time in May 2014 during the NZ International Comedy Festival, with the show Where Is My Mind?

In the second half of 2016, Robins embarked on a tour show with co-host Elis James called The Elis James and John Robins Experience.

Robins performed a solo show at the Edinburgh Festival every year between 2009 and 2015, starting with Skinny Love. His subsequent shows were Nomadic Revery (2010), Lift Your Skinny Fists Like Antennas to Heaven (2011), Incredible Scenes (2012), Where Is My Mind? (2013), This Tornado Loves You (2014) and Speakeasy (2015). All shows were also toured around the UK. He has also performed at the Machynlleth Comedy Festival and the Leicester Comedy Festival.

In August 2017, Robins won (jointly with Hannah Gadsby) the Edinburgh Comedy Award for his show that year, The Darkness of Robins, which focused on the breakdown of his relationship with comedian Sara Pascoe and his personal life after the break-up. It was the first time he had been nominated for the award. The show was later filmed by the BBC and eventually made available to watch on Netflix.

In June 2018, it was announced that Robins would host a game show for Dave entitled Beat the Internet, co-presented with fellow comic Sunil Patel. The show ran for 20 episodes and was not renewed for a second series. Also that year Robins and James published a book, The Holy Vible.

In February 2019 Robins launched a YouTube channel called Bad Golf with friend and fellow comedian Alex Horne. As of November 2026, they have more than 61,000 subscribers, but are no longer proucing any content. Following the popularity of the channel, Robins received a kit sponsorship, with Puma's golf brand Cobra providing him with new clubs, bag and clothing.

After five years broadcasting on Radio X (previously XFM), the Elis James and John Robins show aired its final episode on the station on Saturday 30 March 2019. On 2 April 2019, Robins announced that he and Elis James would be hosting a new show on BBC Radio 5 Live. The BBC show has been broadcast since 31 May 2019, and all episodes are downloadable as podcasts.

Robins returned to Edinburgh in 2019 with the show Hot Shame. In October 2019 Elis and John launched a new podcast How Do You Cope?...with Elis and John on BBC Radio 5 Live. It features Elis and John talking to celebrities about mental health issues they have faced. In 2024 the show won the "Radio Times Moment Of The Year" award at the ARIAS for an edition in which John Robins revealed his struggle with alcohol addiction and his journey to recovery.

Robins launched a podcast in April 2021, The Moon Under Water, with fellow comedian and friend Robin Allender. In each episode a guest chats about their dream pub. The pair left the podcast in 2023 following Robins' alcohol addiction disclosure, and were replaced as "landlord" by Robbie Knox. The podcast was discontinued shortly thereafter.

In 2023 Robins presented his show Howl at the Edinburgh Festival Fringe, performing it and a Work in Progress show daily during the month of the festival. He then toured the show Howl, constructed of both shows, discussing recent changes in his life and his new sobriety.

Robins appeared as a contestant on the seventeenth series of the Channel 4 show Taskmaster which launched in March 2024. He won the series. As the winner of his series he competed in the fourth installment of the Taskmaster Champion of Champions, taking on the last four other winners Andy Zaltzman, Maisie Adam, Mathew Baynton and Sam Campbell. The episode aired on December 22nd 2025.

In 2025 Robins and Elis James staged a tour called Elis & John: That Feels Significant: Live! alongside their podcast's producer, Dave Masterman.

In February 2025, Robins announced that How Do You Cope? would return, no longer on the BBC and without Elis James co-hosting. In September, he announced that in 2026 he would be publishing a memoir entitled Thirst: Twelve Drinks That Changed My Life, discussing his relationship with alcohol and later battle with alcoholism.

In June 2026, UKTV announced that Robins co-present "Dara's Dull Appreciation Society" alongside Dara Ó Briain.

== Awards and accolades ==
- 2015 Chortle Awards – Best Compère.
- 2017 Chortle Awards – Radio Award for Elis James and John Robins on Radio X
- 2017 Edinburgh Comedy Award winner – Best Show shared with Hannah Gadsby
- 2020 Audio and Radio Industry Awards – Funniest Show for Elis James and John Robins
- 2021 Broadcasting Press Guild Awards – Best Podcast for How Do You Cope?…with Elis and John
- 2023 British Podcast Awards – Best Entertainment for Elis James and John Robins
- 2024 Chortle Awards – Best Radio Show for Elis James and John Robins
- 2024 Audio and Radio Industry Awards – Radio Times Moment Of The Year for an episode of How Do You Cope? in which John Robins revealed his struggle with alcohol addiction and his journey to recovery.
- 2026 Open University awarded John Robins with an Honorary Doctorate for Services to Public Understanding of Mental Health.

== Personal life ==
In 2012, Robins moved to London.

Robins has described himself as "broadly vegan". He has also described himself as left-wing, and admires socialist Labour Party politicians Tony Benn and Dennis Skinner, though he has since clarified that he does not support far-left politics. He opposed Brexit.

Robins was for several years in a relationship with fellow comedian Sara Pascoe. They split in 2016, with both using their experience of the break-up and its consequences to create successful Edinburgh Fringe shows, Robins' winning the 2017 Edinburgh Comedy Award.

Starting in 2018, he was in a relationship with fashion designer Coco Fennell, sister of filmmaker Emerald Fennell and daughter of jewellery designer Theo Fennell. Robins and Fennell became engaged in 2019. Robins confirmed on his Radio 5 Live show in December 2021 that the couple had split.

Robins is a keen golfer and posts regularly on YouTube under the Bad Golf channel. He is also an experienced board game player, and once finished 11th in the British national Catan championships.

A recovering alcoholic, Robins has been sober since November 2022. He lives in Amersham, Buckinghamshire.
