= Ed Gillespie (environmentalist) =

Edward Roger Martin Gillespie
- Occupations: Inspirational keynote speaker and futurist
- Known for: Co-founded wearefuterra.com, Director of Greenpeace UK

Ed Gillespie is a British environmental entrepreneur and author. His focus is on sustainability and innovation.

== Early life and education ==
He grew up in Norfolk, attending Norwich School. Afterwards he was a volunteer for Project Trust as a teacher in Above Rocks, Jamaica. He completed an BSc in marine biology at the University of Wales and continued in this discipline by undertaking a MSc in Marine Resource Development and Protection at Heriot-Watt University.

After this his focus shifted to business as he enrolled in a Professional Masters in Leadership for Sustainable Development at Middlesex University, a course run by sustainable development charity Forum for the Future. While there he met Townsend, with whom he co-founded Futerra.

== Career ==
Gillespie started his professional career as an Environmental Development Manager at London Transport. Before this he had worked for the Survival Natural History Film Unit and as a marine biologist in Australia, New Caledonia and Orkney.

In 2001, he co-founded Futerra Sustainability Communications with Solitaire Townsend. He left the business in January 2019 to pursue other opportunities in public speaking through the London Speaker Bureau, with the Forward Institute - where he works as a facilitator on responsible leadership development and with start-up businesses.

In 2007/8, he traveled around the world without flying, during which he wrote a regular popular column for the Guardian/Observer called "The Slow Traveller". His passion for slow travel led him to invest in, and become chairman of European Rail Business Loco2. This business was sold to SNCF in 2017.

Gillespie has held a number of senior advisory positions and directorships. These include as a non-executive Director for Zero Carbon Food, he was a London Sustainable Development Commissioner for several years, was a director of carbon emissions campaigning organisation Sandbag and an investor in Foodtrade.

He is currently a Director at Greenpeace UK, a Trustee at Energy Revolution and an investor in a wide range of entrepreneurial businesses including Panda Packaging, Piclo, Raw Bottles, Bennaman, Engaged Tracking, Common Objective and Small Robot Company.

Along with fellow futurist Mark Stevenson he is half of the Futurenauts at the Atlas of the Future, and has both spoken at and co-hosted their annual Fixing the Future event in Barcelona.

== Publications and public speaking ==
Gillespie co-presents The Great Humbling podcast with Dark Mountain co-founder Dougald Hine.

Gillespie also co-presents Jon Richardson and the Futurenauts - How to survive the Apocalypse with his fellow futurist Mark Stevenson and 'Britain's 3rd most loved comedian' Jon Richardson.

Gillespie is a regular contributor to The Guardian, which began back in 2007 with his Slow Traveller blog. This developed into commentary on topics around sustainable business, climate change and environmental communications. He still writes on sustainable travel for Conde Nast Traveller.

In June 2014, Wild Things Publishing published Ed's first book, Only Planet. The book is based on his 2007/8 trip and the Independent described it as allowing "the world's flaws and beauty to seep into your soul".

Gillespie is regularly invited to lecture around the world to audiences, including the UN, national governments, multinational corporations and citizen organizations. He has given two TEDx talks, the first in 2010 about the importance of embedding sustainability into business strategy in a talk titled 'Sustainability, the reinvention of progress' and the second in Hackney in 2015 on the future of food in 'We literally are what we eat'.
