= Dan Swimer =

TV writer and producer

- Born: 1972 (age 53–54); Manchester, England, United Kingdom
- Education: attended Manchester Grammar School and then Leeds University
- Occupations: television writer, producer

Dan Swimer (born 1972 in Manchester) is a British television writer, producer, consultant and associate. He has produced episodes of Popworld, Lily Allen and Friends, and Sacha Baron Cohen's Who Is America?. He wrote material for Never Mind the Buzzcocks, How TV Ruined Your Life and Stand Up for the Week. He and Simon Amstell wrote Grandma's House. He has worked on You Have Been Watching and Ask Rhod Gilbert and has written for BBC Three show, Crims. He has two children.
