= Only Planet =

2014 book by Ed Gillespie

Only Planet: Around the World Without Flying
- First edition
- Author: Ed Gillespie
- Language: English
- Publisher: Wild Things Publishing
- Publication date: 2014
- Pages: 312
- ISBN: 095715738X
- OCLC: 876287841

Only Planet is a book by environment entrepreneur Ed Gillespie about his flight-free adventure around the world. Published in June 2014 by Wild Things Publishing, the book embraces environmentally-sustainable slow travel.

== Plot summary ==
Gillespie and his then-girlfriend Fiona set out on a year-long global circumnavigation of the world without flying, eliminating flying-associated carbon emissions while rediscovering the joys of travelling through the world and not just over it in a plane. Their journey covers over 40,000 miles in 31 countries. Throughout his journey, Gillespie gains different perspectives on climate change, globalisation, and society's role in shaping the future, while also gaining first-hand insight into the way our planet is changing.

Each chapter explores a different topic relevant to that part of the journey. For example, while in Japan overfishing is focused upon.

== Reviews ==
Only Planet has been well received by reviewers. The Independent described the book as both "witty" and "thought-provoking", with the essence of the book showing how "slow travel allows time for the flaws, degradation and struggles of the world, as well as its breathtaking beauty and indefatigable human spirit, to seep into the soul." TreeHugger recounts the way in which the book's "humorous cross-cultural encounters and descriptions of stunning geography" are coupled with "a passionate conversation about climate change." Geographical Magazine said that the slow travel enables a "transformative" journey in a "way that air travel can never be."
