= It's Not Me, It's You! =

Book by Jon Richardson

- First edition cover
- Author: Jon Richardson
- Language: English
- Publication date: 23 June 2011
- Publication place: United Kingdom

It's Not Me, It's You! is a book written by English comedian Jon Richardson based on his 2011 comedy show of the same name. It was published in the UK by HarperCollins on 23 June 2011. Richardson has said "it is not an autobiography" but rather it is a "relationship guide from the point of view of someone who hasn't been in one for eight years". The book began as an article in The Guardian newspaper's Weekend Supplement Valentine's Day issue, that was printed on 13 February 2010.

== Synopsis ==
The book focuses on Richardson's various neurotic and obsessive-compulsive tendencies, and his seemingly endless pursuit of perfection. The plot details Richardson's quest to find love. After 8 years of being single and getting everything the way he likes it, all he wants now is to find "someone to give it all up for".

The book follows Richardson as he carries out the day-to-day tasks of a comic. He drives to a comedy gig, stays at a bed & breakfast while analysing the people there, texts a girl he likes, stops at a service station on the way home, does the washing up, goes to the gym, and travels into London for a meeting about writing the book. All the while, the reader gets an insight into Richardson's unique perspective on the world, life and other people. For instance, he divides the world into two kinds of people: A person is either a 'putter', someone who puts things away and knows where their belongings are at all times, or a 'leaver', someone who constantly loses their things.

== Reviews ==
ShortList described It's Not Me, It's You! as a "staggeringly honest memoir", "boldly funny and expertly written, it’s a look at dark subjects deftly handled by an engaging comic talent.".
