= Jon Richardson =

English comedian (born 1982)

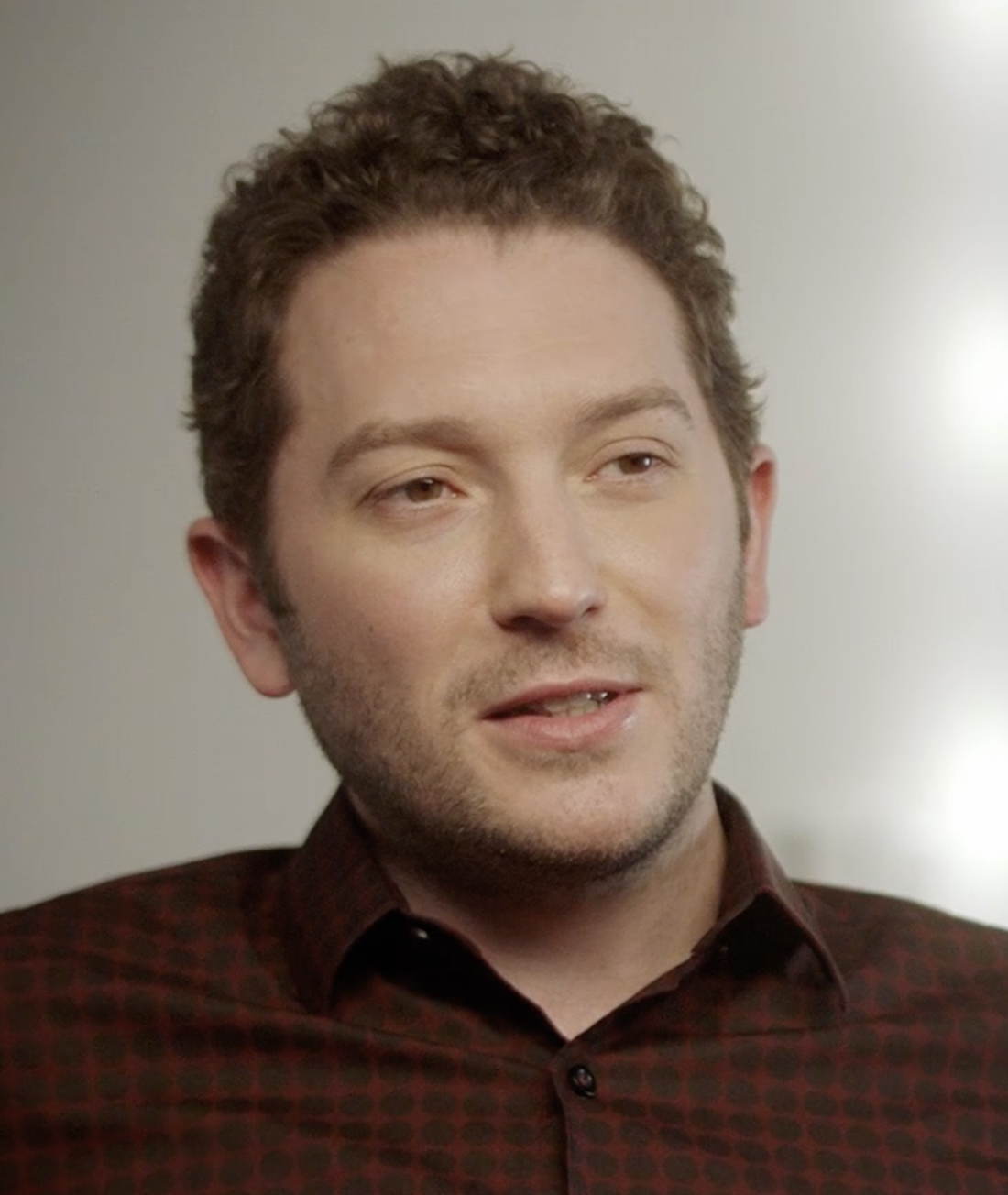
- Richardson in 2016
- Born: Jon Joel Richardson; 26 September 1982 (age 44); Lancaster, Lancashire, England
- Education: University of Bristol
- Notable work: 8 Out of 10 Cats; 8 Out of 10 Cats Does Countdown; Waterloo Road
- Spouse: Lucy Beaumont (m. 2015; div. 2024)
- Children: 1

Comedy career
- Medium: Stand-up comedy, writing
- Website: jonrichardsoncomedy.com

Jon Joel Richardson (born 26 September 1982) is an English comedian, actor and radio presenter. He is known for his appearances on 8 Out of 10 Cats and 8 Out of 10 Cats Does Countdown and his work as co-host with Russell Howard on BBC Radio 6 Music. He presented Jon Richardson: Ultimate Worrier, and also featured with his then-wife Lucy Beaumont in the TV show Meet the Richardsons. He also appeared in series 16–17 of Waterloo Road.

== Early life ==
Jon Joel Richardson was born on 26 September 1982 in Lancaster, Lancashire, where he was also brought up. He attended Ryelands Primary School and Lancaster Royal Grammar School. He left the University of Bristol after taking Hispanic Studies for a year and a half, and subsequently spent some time working as a chef. He then decided to pursue a career in comedy, and lived with fellow comedians Russell Howard, Mark Olver and John Robins for a year in Bristol.

== Career ==
=== 2000s ===
Richardson entered and won his heat of the BBC New Talent Comedy Search in May 2003. He also reached the semi-finals of the Laughing Horse New Act of the Year competition in 2004. Quickly developing throughout 2004, he was one of six acts to reach the final of the J2O Last Laugh Comedy Search. He marked the end of his first year in comedy with a performance at the Criterion Theatre in London's West End. Judges Jasper Carrott and Dave Spikey were both "extremely impressed" with Richardson's performance.

In 2006, Richardson appeared in The Comedy Zone at the Edinburgh Festival. He also completed a 60-date British and Irish tour with Alan Carr, and made an appearance on Paramount's The Comedy Store. In 2007, Spatula Pad, (Richardson's first solo show at the Edinburgh Festival Fringe) earned him a Best Newcomer nomination at the Edinburgh Comedy Awards. Richardson won the 2008 Chortle Award for Best Breakthrough Act, and performed Dogmatic (his second solo show) at the Edinburgh Festival Fringe. He later took this show around the country in his first solo tour. In 2008, he appeared as a team captain in Simon Mayo's BBC Radio 4 series Act Your Age.

=== 2010s ===
Richardson co-hosted a Sunday-morning radio show on BBC Radio 6 Music with fellow comedian and friend Russell Howard, and after Howard left, he continued to present the show himself until 7 March 2010. In early 2009, Richardson's show This Guy at Night was nominated for the Edinburgh Comedy Awards main prize. That year, he appeared on the BBC music quiz show Never Mind the Buzzcocks. He also appeared on Have I Got News for You in December 2009 and October 2010, and was a guest on David Mitchell's The Bubble.

Richardson appeared on the BBC Radio 5 Live show Fighting Talk in February 2010. He was curator of The Museum of Curiosity for its third series. On 21 March 2010, he presented a BBC Three programme about compulsions and strange habits, entitled Different Like Me. Richardson has performed at comedy festivals in Leeds, Guildford, and Bristol, and has headlined university gigs for Off the Kerb and Avalon. He has also compèred in the French Alps, headlined in Barcelona, and performed a one-man show in Greece. In 2010, he also performed at the Melbourne International Comedy Festival.

Starting with the 11th series of Channel 4's panel show 8 Out of 10 Cats, Richardson took over from Jason Manford as a team captain. Filming for the series began in June 2011. It's Not Me, It's You!, Richardson's first book, was published during the same month. Later in 2011, he became a regular comic on the Channel 4 show Stand Up for the Week, which was hosted by Kevin Bridges during its second series. Upon Bridges's departure, Richardson took over as host, a role he left after series 4 in 2012. Since January 2012, he has also been a regular on Channel 4's 8 Out of 10 Cats Does Countdown.

Richardson presented a 2012 documentary entitled A Little Bit OCD, in which he studied the lives of people diagnosed with OCD and worried that he might have the same condition; he was indeed revealed to exhibit symptoms of OCD, but did not show signs of the accompanying dysfunction. The show won the 2013 Mind Award in the documentary category.

On 19 November 2012, Richardson released his first stand up DVD, Funny Magnet. The performance was recorded at the Apollo Theatre in Hammersmith on 9 September 2012. The DVD also features Richardson's set from Live at the Apollo and audio commentary with his then-housemate, comedian Matt Forde. In December 2012, Channel 4 broadcast The Real Man's Road Trip: Sean & Jon Go West, a two-part series in which Richardson and Sean Lock travelled to Louisiana to experience the local culture and lifestyle. The show was filmed in September 2012.

Richardson began Work in Progress shows in late 2013, and in 2014 took his new show Nidiot on the road culminating in a DVD of the same name. In August 2013, he headlined the comedy stage at the V Festival. Appearing on Radio 5's Fighting Talk on 11 January 2014, Richardson said his worst ever gig was a couple of months previously at The Doncaster Dome. He claimed the initial smattering of applause quickly reduced through his time on stage.

Richardson has presented two series in which he and his guests discuss their worries, in the Dave panel show Jon Richardson: Ultimate Worrier (2018–2019).

=== 2020s ===
In 2020, Richardson appeared in the mockumentary sitcom Meet the Richardsons for UKTV's Dave and presented Channel Hopping With Jon Richardson on Comedy Central. The former is a documentary-style sitcom written by Richardson's wife Lucy Beaumont with Tim Reid, in which Lucy has to deal with an exaggerated version of Richardson's character, whilst the latter is a weird TV clips show in the style of Clive James on Television, but with Richardson presenting and two other guests discussing the clips each week. In 2020, Richardson also launched the podcast Jon Richardson and the Futurenauts with co-hosts Mark Stevenson and Ed Gillespie to discuss systemic societal problems and their solutions. The podcast has received overwhelming positive reviews. The Arts Desk remarked "without making light of [the subject matter], Richardson and Co find the funny." Since 2020, Richardson has also co-hosted the Down the Dog podcast with Matt Forde.

In January 2023, Richardson and Beaumont launched Jon & Lucy's Odd Couples – a panel show featuring celebrity couples answering questions about their private lives and performing various tasks to test their relationships. The show was first announced in 2022 with an order of 6 hour-long episodes.

On 13 August 2024, it was announced that Richardson would return to radio in September that same year to present a Saturday-morning show on Absolute Radio.

On 1 April 2025, Richardson posted a video to social media announcing he was retiring from comedy to go into teaching, something he had dreams of since being a child. In reality, this was an April Fools joke to announce that he would join the cast of the school-based drama series Waterloo Road for its sixteenth series. In the show, Richardson appears as a new character, media studies teacher Darius Donovan.

== Personal life ==
Richardson lived in Swindon for seven years, then in Surbiton, London, with fellow comedians Matt Forde and Danny Buckler. He also lived with comedians John Robins and Russell Howard. In a 2012 interview with Woman magazine, he mentioned he had bought a house in the Lake District for his mother. He is a vegan and supporter of Leeds United. In July 2019, Richardson mentioned on Saturday Kitchen that he had moved across to Calder Valley, West Yorkshire, from Lancashire.

He married comedian Lucy Beaumont in April 2015; the pair were introduced by their mutual friend and comedian Roisin Conaty and dated for about two years prior to marriage. They had a daughter in September 2016. Richardson and Beaumont announced their divorce in April 2024.

Richardson has explored whether he has obsessive–compulsive disorder (OCD), concluding that he instead has obsessive–compulsive personality disorder (OCPD); the difference is that OCD is a type of mental disorder, whereas OCPD is a type of personality disorder. His exploration of his obsessive–compulsive behaviour was the subject of his Edinburgh Festival Fringe show Spatula Pad. In 2018, Richardson told Radio Times that he had been to counselling for six months, calling it "an immensely positive step". Saying "I wish I'd done it sooner", Richardson said "acknowledging there's a problem is the best thing" and recommended counselling to "anyone who's even mildly upset about anything".

In June 2023, Richardson was made an honorary member of Sheffield F.C. after he visited the club to film for Meet the Richardsons, along with Adrian Chiles and Matt Forde.

== Politics ==
In the 2024 General Election, Richardson featured in a political advert for the Labour Party.

== Stand-up shows ==
Year	Title	Notes
2008–2009	Dogmatic	
2009–2010	This Guy at Night	Nominated – Edinburgh Comedy Award
2010–2011	Don't Happy, Be Worry	
2011–2012	Funny Magnet	
2014	Nidiot	
2017–2018	Old Man	
2020–2024	The Knitwit	

=== DVD releases ===
Title	Released	Notes
Funny Magnet	19 November 2012	Live at London's Apollo Theatre
Jon Richardson Live: Nidiot	1 December 2014	Live at London's Hammersmith Apollo
Old Man (Live)	19 November 2018	Live at Blackpool's Grand Theatre

== Filmography ==
=== Film, Television, and radio ===
Year	Title	Notes
Unknown	After Hours	Documentary
2005	The Henry Kelly Show	
2005	Live at the Comedy Store	
2005	Steve Lamacq's Roundtable	BBC 6 Music
2005	Most Annoying Pop Moments: We Hate to Love	
2005	Comedy Shuffle	Appeared in three sketches entitled 'Fearing the Worst'
2005	4 Stands Up	
2005	Out to Lunch	
2005	It's Debatable	
2005	Never Write Off the Germans	
2006–2008	The Russell Howard Show	BBC 6 Music
2007	28 Acts in 28 Minutes	BBC Radio 4
2008–2010	The Jon Richardson Show	
2009	Michael McIntyre's Comedy Roadshow	
2009	Walk on the Wild Side	Voice only
2009–2010	Never Mind the Buzzcocks	
2009–2011	Have I Got News for You	
2010	The Bubble	
2010	Spicks and Specks	
2010	Grouchy Young Men	
2010	Different Like Me	
2010	The Vote Now Show	
2010	Richard Bacon's Beer & Pizza Club	
2010	The Museum of Curiosity	
2010	Act Your Age	Team captain
2010	8 Out of 10 Cats	Guest
2010–2011	Fighting Talk	
2011	Stand Up for the Week	
2011	The Graham Norton Show	
2011–2015	8 Out of 10 Cats	Team captain
2012–present	8 Out of 10 Cats Does Countdown	Team captain
2012	Comedy World Cup	
2012	A Little Bit OCD	
2012	The Real Man's Road Trip: Sean & Jon Go West	
2013	Room 101	Guest
2013–2018	Would I Lie to You?	Guest
2014	Jon Richardson Grows Up	
2016	Taskmaster	Contestant
2016–2017	The One Show	Guest presenter; 4 episodes
2018–2019	Jon Richardson: Ultimate Worrier	Presenter
2019	Comedians Watching Football with Friends	
2019	The Great Celebrity Bake Off for SU2C	Contestant
2019	Saturday Kitchen	Guest
2020	Channel Hopping With Jon Richardson	
2020	The Jonathan Ross Show	Guest
2020	The Last Leg	Guest
2020	James Martin's Saturday Morning	Guest
2020	8 Out of 10 Cats Does Countdown Christmas Special 2020	Team captain
2020	Kevin McCloud's Rough Guide to the Future	
2020–2024	Meet the Richardsons	
2021	Celebrity Trash Monsters	Presenter
2021	Jon & Lucy's Christmas Sleepover	Co-host with Lucy Beaumont
2022–2023	Celebrity Gogglebox	With Lucy Beaumont
2022	One Night In... Legoland (With Josh Widdicombe and Alex Brooker)	Guest with Lucy Beaumont
2022	Jon Richardson: Take My Mother-in-Law	Presenter
2022	Jon & Lucy's Party of the Year	Co-host with Lucy Beaumont
2023	Jon & Lucy's Odd Couples	Co-host with Lucy Beaumont
2023	The Wheel	Expert
2025–2026	Waterloo Road	Darius Donovan
2025	Smurfs	Grouchy Smurf (Voice Role, UK Dub)
2026	Our Yorkshire Pub Rescue with Jon Richardson	Presenter
2026	The Great Stand Up to Cancer Bake Off	Contestant; series nine
2026	The Great British Bake Off: Second Helpings	Host
