= Russell Howard & Mum =

- Also known as: Russell Howard & Mum: USA Road Trip; Russell Howard & Mum: Road Trip; Russell Howard & Mum: Globetrotters
- Starring: Russell Howard; Ninette Howard
- Country of origin: United Kingdom
- Original language: English
- No. of series: 4
- No. of episodes: 24 (list of episodes)

Production
- Production locations: United States; Thailand; Japan; South Korea; Vietnam
- Production company: Avalon Television

Original release
- Network: Comedy Central
- Release: 19 October 2016 – 13 November 2019

Russell Howard & Mum (known as Russell Howard & Mum: USA Road Trip in series 1 and 2, and Russell Howard & Mum: Globetrotters in series 3 and 4) is a British comedy/travel series presented by comedian Russell Howard.

The series was commissioned in April 2016. The first episode was broadcast on Comedy Central on 19 October 2016. A second series began on 26 March 2018.

A third series titled Russell Howard & Mum: Globetrotters began on 23 January 2019. A fourth series began on 9 October 2019

In 2021, Howard began a new travelogue series for Sky One called Russell Howard Stands Up To The World, which saw the comedian on tour in Australia and New Zealand, where he met Sam Neill and tried the manu bomb diving manoeuvre.

== Premise ==
The series features Howard and his mother, Ninette, travelling across America and meeting people with unusual hobbies and obsessions.
