= Elis James =

Welsh comedian

- Elis James 25/09/26 at The Bedford
- Born: Owain Elis James; 3 November 1980 (age 45); Haverfordwest, Pembrokeshire, Wales
- Spouse: Isy Suttie (m. 2024)
- Children: 2

Comedy career
- Years active: 2005–present
- Medium: Stand-up, television, radio
- Genre: Observational comedy
- Subjects: Everyday life, Welsh culture
- Website: elisjames.co

Owain Elis James (born 3 November 1980) is a Welsh comedian, broadcaster and actor. James is known as a stand-up comedian and for his weekly radio show and podcast with John Robins for BBC Radio 5 Live, his football punditry and presenting, and his TV acting roles. James's first language is Welsh and he performs stand-up in English and Welsh.

== Early life ==
James was born in Haverfordwest and grew up in Carmarthen. He has two younger sisters, Carys and Nia. James' mother worked with the father of fellow Welsh comedian Rhod Gilbert and the mother of Welsh musician Euros Childs.

James studied Modern History and Politics at Cardiff University.

Prior to becoming a professional comedian, James engaged in various forms of employment, including temp work, charity work and part-time work at a café.

== Career ==
=== Comedy ===
James began his comedy career in 2005, though he had previously won the Maes B comedy award at the 1999 National Eisteddfod of Wales. He made the transition to full-time comedy work in 2008. Prior to moving full-time to comedy, James was guitarist with the Cardiff-based indie/punk band Heck, fronted by Jemma Roper. The band recorded an EP and received airplay on BBC 6 Music, BBC Radio Wales and BBC Introducing's Wales show, then broadcast on Radio 1. They also performed on new bands nights organised by the NME.

James commenced his role as Rex Jones, an old caretaker who is a post-Marxist with a health-and-safety obsession, in the live show Chris Corcoran's Committee Meeting in 2009. The show, conceived by Welsh comedian Chris Corcoran, was held for three years at the Muni Arts Centre. Corcoran explained in 2014: "We would write each show from scratch in the space of five days and the first time we'd perform it would be in front of the audience."

James supported Rhod Gilbert on his national UK tour, "Rhod Gilbert and the Award-Winning Mince Pie", in 2010. Supporting Gilbert, James experienced performances before audiences of over 1,500 people and he later said that he felt like a "pop star" when he walked on stage during the tour. James performed the "Daytripper" show at the 2010 Edinburgh Festival Fringe.

James and Corcoran later performed in a "best of" show based on the Chris Corcoran's Committee Meeting shows, including the Social Club FM spin-off radio show, at the 2012 Edinburgh Festival Fringe. The show received the Guardian Pick of the Fringe accolade and led to the production of The Committee Meeting television pilot after Tiger Aspect expressed interest.

In 2012, in response to a question about whether there is a difference between English and Welsh comedy, James replied:

There are differences, however slight, and the references are obviously different. But not so different that Welsh comics can't be successful in England, and vice versa. There are plenty of regional differences in English humour. I would tailor my material differently if I was in Aberystwyth as opposed to Manchester, but not radically.

James was the MC of the Machynlleth Comedy Festival Gala performance at the May 2014 Hay Festival. James performed alongside his partner Isy Suttie, as well as comedians Henry Paker and Mike Wozniak. At the 2015 Machynlleth Comedy Festival, James performed a new Work in Progress show, as well as a set in Welsh.

In late 2015, James recorded a stand-up special in Welsh titled Rhacs Jibiders. It was broadcast on S4C and was also available (as with many of the channel's shows) on the BBC iPlayer. His next Welsh-language show, Haleliw, was first broadcast on Christmas Day 2019.

In 2020 James began co-hosting The Socially Distant Sports Bar podcast with sports journalist Steff Garrero and comedian Mike Bubbins, based on their love of sport but lack of live sport due to the COVID-19 pandemic.

In 2025 James and John Robins staged a tour called Elis & John: That Feels Significant: Live! alongside their podcast's producer, Dave Masterman. In 2025 James also began performing stand-up comedy in English for the first time in nearly a decade.

=== Radio ===
James played Rex Jones in the radio spin-off of Chris Corcoran's Committee Meeting, Social Club FM, which was initially broadcast in August 2011 for BBC Radio Wales and ran for two years.

Following a pilot show, on 16 February 2014 James started broadcasting the Elis James and John Robins show on XFM (now Radio X), co-hosting with fellow comedian John Robins. The show was broadcast on Saturday afternoons and released a popular podcast. The show had its final broadcast on 30 March 2019.

On 2 April 2019, it was announced that James and Robins will be hosting a new Friday afternoon radio show on BBC Radio 5 Live starting 31 May.

James has hosted Elis James's Pantheon of Heroes on BBC Radio Wales since 2012. In the show, which also features Nadia Kamil and Ben Partridge, various figures from Welsh history are comically compared to each other in an attempt to identify the most heroic. Four series have been broadcast so far. Since 2014, James has also co-written and co-starred in the BBC Radio Wales sketch show Here Be Dragons. The show won the 2014 Sony Award - Bronze for Best Comedy.

On Welsh-language radio, he hosted Dwy Iaith, Un Ymennydd for BBC Radio Cymru. In this series he interviewed personalities such as Prys Morgan, Sioned Wiliam and Dafydd Iwan.

A pilot episode of Ankle Tag aired on BBC Radio 2 in 2015 in which James played the lead alongside Steve Speirs and Katy Wix. The show has run for three series on BBC Radio 4 from 2017 to 2020.

In 2016, James hosted Elis in Euroland for BBC Radio Wales, a series reporting on the 2016 Euros campaign by the Wales national football team, of which he's been a lifelong fan. The team reached the tournament's semi-finals.

James has also been hosting the BBC podcast Elis James' Feast of Football since August 2017, along with former Welsh Internationals Iwan Roberts and Danny Gabbidon, discussing the fortunes of the Welsh national team and Welsh clubs Cardiff, Swansea, Newport and Wrexham.

In 2020 James became the Champion of Champions in BBC Radio 5 Live's Fighting Talk, defeating one of the big beasts of the show, Steve Bunce.

James also makes occasional appearances on The Guardian's Football Weekly podcast, usually to talk about the performances of the Welsh national team.

=== Television ===
James presented early episodes of the S4C music television programme Bandit and has appeared in segments of Hwb, S4C's Welsh-learners programme. He also appeared in the Welsh language comedy-drama Cowbois Ac Injans in 2007.

In 2013 The Committee Meeting was part of BBC Three's "Comedy Feeds", a series of comedy television pilots available exclusively via the BBC iPlayer. The pilot starred James and Corcoran, and featured guest Colin Baker. It was screened on BBC One Wales in August 2014. In 2014 James appeared as Nigel in series 2 episode 3 of Crackanory on the Dave channel, and as Owen in the BBC Three "Comedy Feed" pilot Josh, starring Josh Widdicombe. Josh was commissioned and ran for three series on BBC Three from 2015 to 2017. He also starred in the BBC prison sitcom Crims. which aired on BBC Three in early 2015.

In 2015 he appeared on The Really Welsh Christmas Quiz on BBC One Wales, alongside fellow comedians Chris Corcoran, Miles Jupp and Omar Hamdi. In October 2017, James starred in James and Jupp, a four part travel series on BBC Two in which James showed Miles Jupp around Wales. In 2018, James took part in BBC Two's game show Richard Osman's House of Games. In October 2018, James appeared in the Welsh episode of HISTORY's TV series Al Murray: Why Does Everyone Hate The English alongside host Al Murray. Also in October 2018, James starred in and narrated 'Greatest Ever Movie Blunders' for Channel 5.

From 2018 he has appeared as Nez in the semi-improvised mockumentary Tourist Trap on BBC One Wales. The show ran for two series and two specials. He is the narrator of the BBC Four documentary The Secret Life of Farm Animals, first broadcast in March 2022. From 2022 to 2024, James co-hosted Sky Max's revival of Fantasy Football League, of which he was also a writer.

=== Acting filmography ===
Year	Title	Role	Notes
2015	Crims	Luke	
2015–2017	Josh	Owen	
2016	Sarah Chong Is Going to Kill Herself	The Marrieds	Short film
2018–2020	Tourist Trap	Nez	
2019	Denmark	Aubrey	

== Awards and accolades ==
James won the Best Comedy prize at the National Student Radio Awards in 2006.

In March 2017 James won Chortle's Best Radio Show award with co-host John Robins, for their weekly show on Radio X.

In 2020, the show won a Gold Award at the Audio and Radio Industry Awards in the category of 'Funniest Show'.

The show's sister podcast on BBC Radio 5 Live, "How Do You Cope?...with Elis and John", won the Broadcasting Press Guild award for best podcast in 2021. In 2024 the show won the "Radio Times Moment of the Year" award at the ARIAS for an edition in which John Robins revealed his struggle with alcohol addiction and his journey to recovery.

== Personal life ==
James is a supporter of Swansea City and Wales, and has an extensive collection of retro shirts of both teams. He said in 2010 that the worst thing about being a comedian is when the timing of Swansea City games clashes with his live show commitments. James is politically "left-wing" and pro-Welsh Independence.

James married his longtime partner, actress, comedian and musician Isy Suttie, on 17 August 2024. The couple met in 2009 and began dating in 2010. They now live in Crystal Palace, South London, and have two children.
