= Lucy Beaumont (comedian) =

English comedian

- Born: Lucy Ann Beaumont; 1983 (age 42–43); Truro, Cornwall, England
- Education: University of Hull
- Spouse: Jon Richardson (m. 2015; div. 2024)
- Children: 1

Comedy career
- Years active: 2009–present
- Medium: Stand-up; television

Lucy Ann Beaumont (born 1983) is an English comedian from Hull. Her early performances were based largely on anecdotes about Hull and the wider Northern region. She was a finalist on So You Think You're Funny in 2011 and won the BBC Radio New Comedy Awards in 2012. Her 2014 debut show at the Edinburgh Fringe, We Can Twerk It Out, was nominated for that year's Best Newcomer Award.

== Early life and education ==
Lucy Ann Beaumont was born prematurely in Truro while her parents were on holiday in Cornwall. She grew up with a single mother in the Spring Bank area of Hull. She later lived in the town of Hessle, near Hull. Her mother, playwright Gill Adams, won the Fringe First Award for best new play in 1997 at the Edinburgh Festival.

Beaumont attended Hessle High School, before going on to Wyke Sixth Form College. She worked at the meat counter of Asda on Hessle Road, West Hull, and later went on to the University of Hull, graduating with a degree in drama studies.

After university, she briefly worked as a teaching assistant. When one of her first acting jobs after university fell through, Beaumont took on a job as a cleaner at the university to make a living, leading her to joke later that she was probably the only person with both a BA and an NVQ from the University of Hull.

== Career ==
Beaumont had a brief acting career, touring with Hull Truck Theatre, York Theatre Royal and West Yorkshire Playhouse. She switched to comedy after she had initially tried it in an attempt to conquer stage fright and was inspired by her sitcom-like life in her home city of Hull. In 2009, she took part in the BBC's Northern Laughs programme, in which she was mentored by Jeremy Dyson.

Her early performances were based largely on anecdotes about Hull and the wider Northern region. She is known for her observational comedy about Hull, including the local dialect and food such as patties and chip spice. Her on-stage persona delivers deadpan anecdotes and has been described as "ditzily naïve".

Her first gig was for the 2011 So You Think You're Funny competition, for which she would later become a finalist.

Beaumont co-wrote and starred in the radio sitcom To Hull and Back, starring fellow Hull actor Maureen Lipman. The sitcom started with a pilot on BBC Radio 2 in 2014, and a full series was ordered. Three series of the show were broadcast between 2015 and 2018. She wrote an article in The Guardian about Hull in 2015 as it prepared to be UK City of Culture. In 2017, Beaumont presented the BBC Two documentary Welcome to Hull – City of Culture 2017. Beaumont is also the narrator in the 2018 BBC documentary Hull's Headscarf Heroes about Lillian Bilocca and the 1968 Triple Trawler Disaster. Beaumont said that the story moved her especially because her grandparents and their families were "born and bred in the fishing community on [Hull's] Hessle Road."

In 2013, Beaumont appeared on BBC Three's Live at the Electric. She presented her show We Can Twerk It Out at the Edinburgh Festival Fringe in 2014.

Beaumont was a guest on Dave's Alan Davies: As Yet Untitled in 2015 and on the BBC Two panel quiz show QI in 2016. She was a regular guest on the Dave panel show Jon Richardson: Ultimate Worrier, hosted by her husband Jon Richardson, in 2018 and 2019.

In 2019, Beaumont returned to the Edinburgh Festival with her show Space Mam, which she also took on tour in the UK.

Beaumont was team captain for the University of Hull team on BBC Two's 2019 Christmas University Challenge. Although they won their first round, the score was insufficient to advance to the semi-finals. Beaumont also made her first appearance on 8 Out of 10 Cats Does Countdown alongside her husband Jon Richardson, Sean Lock, and Bob Mortimer for the 2019 Christmas special.

A comedy series, Meet the Richardsons, written by Beaumont and Tim Reid, was broadcast on Dave from February 2020; it is a documentary-style sitcom with Beaumont and Richardson playing exaggerated versions of themselves. A two-part Christmas Special aired from 9 December 2020 and a second series followed in April 2021. The third series began broadcasting in March 2022, with the fourth series airing from 6 April 2023. A fifth series began broadcasting in April 2024, at a time when it was later revealed Lucy and Jon had separated.

In 2021, Channel 4 commissioned a comedy series called Hullraisers from Beaumont, co-written with Anne-Marie O'Connor and Caroline Moran. Beaumont also released her first book Drinking Custard: Diary of a Confused Mum, which details her struggles with her pregnancy and motherhood.

In 2022, Beaumont appeared in an episode of the revival series of The Weakest Link, hosted by Romesh Ranganathan. She was voted out in round 3.

Beaumont was a contestant in the 16th series of Taskmaster, broadcast September–November 2023. She was placed last. Den of Geek's Louisa Mellor praised her as consistently funny and interesting for her "child-like joy" during tasks and strange anecdotes from her childhood.

In 2024, Beaumont told a story on the panel show Would I Lie to You? (and later on episode 237 of the comedy podcast Off Menu with Ed Gamble and James Acaster) about pretending to have type 1 diabetes to get food on a plane. The diabetes research charity JDRF condemned the show's use of the story for humour.

Since 2024, Beaumont has co-hosted the Lucy & Sam's Perfect Brains podcast with Sam Campbell.

In May 2025, Beaumont was announced as a contestant on the first series of The Celebrity Traitors. Beaumont was selected as a 'Faithful' but was eventually 'murdered' face to face in the seventh episode.

Beaumont told Sky News in November 2026 that she had aided accusers of David Walliams in bringing their stories forward and seeking legal help, even offering to pay legal fees for women who had signed NDAs. She also revealed she was one of the whistleblowers who offered information about Walliams's behaviour with underaged girls to The Guardian.

== Accolades ==
Beaumont won the BBC Radio New Comedy Awards in 2012.

In 2013, Beaumont won the Chortle Award for Best Newcomer.

Her 2014 debut show at the Edinburgh Fringe, We Can Twerk It Out, was nominated for that year's Best Newcomer Award.

At the 2023 British Academy Television Awards, Beaumont was nominated in the Best Female Performance in a Comedy Programme category, for Meet the Richardsons.

== Charity work ==
In 2019, Beaumont set up the project "Backpack Buddies" in Hull to help children in need of meals during the school holidays. To raise funds for the project, Beaumont staged the HULLarity comedy gala in June 2019.

== Personal life ==
Beaumont married comedian Jon Richardson in April 2015 after being introduced by fellow comedian Roisin Conaty. They have a daughter born in September 2016. Beaumont and Richardson divorced in April 2024.

In 2023, she stated publicly that she had been diagnosed with ADHD.

As of 2026, Beaumont lives in Withington, Manchester.

== Filmography ==
=== Television ===
Year	Title	Notes
2018–2019	Jon Richardson: Ultimate Worrier	Guest
2019	Christmas University Challenge	Team captain
2019–present	8 Out of 10 Cats Does Countdown	Guest
2020–2024	Meet the Richardsons	Writer
2021	Richard Osman's House of Games	Contestant
2021	Jon & Lucy's Christmas Sleepover	Co-host with Jon Richardson
2022	One Night In... Legoland (with Josh Widdicombe and Alex Brooker)	Guest with Jon Richardson
2022	The Weakest Link	Contestant
2022	Big Zuu's Big Eats	Guest
2022	Jon & Lucy's Party of the Year	Co-host with Jon Richardson
2022–2023	Celebrity Gogglebox	With Jon Richardson
2022–2023	Hullraisers	Writer
2023–present	Would I Lie to You?	Contestant; multiple episodes
2023	Jon & Lucy's Odd Couples	Co-host with Jon Richardson
2023	The Last Leg	Guest
2023	The Chris & Rosie Ramsey Show	Guest
2023	The Great Stand Up to Cancer Bake Off	Contestant
2023	Have I Got News For You	Guest
2023	Taskmaster	Contestant
2024	The Wheel	Expert
2025	The Celebrity Traitors	Contestant; series 1
2026	The Great Celebrity Pottery Throw Down	Contestant
2026	Not Going Out	Series 15, Episode 4 as Lauren

== Stand-up shows ==
Year	Title	Notes
2024	Lucy Beaumont Live	UK & Ireland tour

== Stage ==
Year	Title	Role	Notes
2026	Road	Valerie/Lane/Louise	Royal Exchange Theatre, Manchester

== Awards and nominations ==
Award	Year	Category	Work	Result	Ref
British Academy Television Awards	2023	Best Female Performance in a Comedy Programme	Meet the Richardsons	Nominated	

== Works ==
- Beaumont, Lucy (30 September 2021). Drinking Custard: The Diary of a Confused Mum. London: Octopus Publishing Group. ISBN 9781913183738.
