= Rob Deering =

English comedian, musician and writer

- Born: 1972 (age 53–54)
- Occupation: Comedian

Rob Deering (born 1972) is an English comedian, musician and writer.

== Personal life ==
Deering grew up in London and Oxfordshire, and lives in London with his wife Julia and their children. Deering is an avid runner and has run over 20 marathons including 11 London Marathons. He has raised over £150,000 for Parkinson's UK.

== Career ==
Deering was the host and writer of three series of Out to Lunch on BBC Radio 2. He also hosted 99 Things to Do Before You Die on Channel 5. In 2007, he appeared on a special edition of The Weakest Link, winning the show and answering all his questions correctly. Deering also appeared on the Channel 4 quiz show Fifteen to One in 1997. He won an edition of Celebrity Mastermind broadcast on 28 December 2014 with a score of 27 points. He has appeared as a guest on shows including Banter, 4 at the Fringe on BBC Radio 4 and Jammin on BBC Radio 2. He has also guest-starred in Jason Manford's Comedy Rocks. He took part in the 'Laughing for a Change' project in 2014, which aimed to raise awareness of mental health through a comedy tour, also featuring Mrs Barbara Nice and Seymour Mace. The project was supported by Time to Change.

Deering currently cohosts a running-themed podcast with fellow comedian and runner Paul Tonkinson called Running Commentary. A book spin-off of the podcast written by Rob can currently be ordered on Unbound.
