= Mark Olver (comedian) =

English stand-up comedian (born 1975)

Mark Olver (born 1975) is an English stand-up comedian from Bristol. He specialises as a compere and a warm-up act for television shows.

== Early life ==
Olver was born in 1975 in Bristol, where he grew up in the Brislington area. His father, John, was a policeman and his mother, Philomena, worked at a cinema in Bristol.

After graduating from university in 1996, he worked as a careers adviser in prisons and young-offenders' institutes.

== Career ==
Olver started doing stand-up in the late 1990s and quickly expanded to compering. He won the Leicester Comedy Festival Best New Show award in 2011. He was nominated for Best Compere at the 2015 Chortle Awards. Olver performed in the live final of the BBC Radio New Comedy Award 2016 in Edinburgh.

He ran Olver's Student Comedy Night at Jesters comedy club in Bristol for several years. While compering a gig there in 2003, Olver slipped and fell on stage, dislocating his knee and breaking his ankle. Lying on the floor, he went on compering until paramedics arrived and carried him off stage.

In 2004, Olver had his first job as a warm-up comedian for the reality-television game show Kings of Comedy, recorded in Bristol and presented by Russell Brand. Since then, he has been providing warm-ups for numerous television shows, including 8 Out of 10 Cats Does Countdown, Pointless, Deal or No Deal, Thronecast, The Last Leg, Alan Davies: As Yet Untitled, Taskmaster and the chat shows hosted by Jonathan Ross and Alan Carr. Between 2005 and 2016, he did warm-up on about 3,000 episodes of the game show Deal or No Deal, which was filmed in Bristol.

Olver has worked teaching comedy to young offenders.

In December 2017, he came up with the idea for the Belly Laughs series of gigs when he realised local restaurants were having trouble getting enough guests in the month of January. January is also a slow month for comedians, so he thought of a way of combining the two as well as raising money for charity, by organising pop-up comedy gigs in restaurants each January since 2018. Guests pay an extra £10 that go directly to The Julian Trust, a Bristol charity that runs an emergency night shelter for homeless people and rough-sleepers. In 2019, the event was expanded to Wales, Bath and Devon.

Belly Laughs got together with the food charity Fareshare in November 2019 for two fundraising gigs at their warehouse in St Philip's, with Olver compering and Angela Barnes and Jon Richardson headlining. The two events raised more than £5000.

In 2020, during the COVID-19 pandemic, Olver launched a comedy panel show on YouTube and subsequently as a podcast called Who Said That?.

Olver was nominated for best compere at the 2023 Chortle Awards.

In 2023 he hosted the pre-show for the national lottery's big Eurovision welcome.

In January 2026, Olver worked as the warm-up on the new BBC quiz show, Wisdom of the Crowd, hosted by John Bishop.

== Personal life ==
Olver has previously shared houses with fellow comedians Russell Howard, John Robins, Jon Richardson and Wil Hodgson. In 2019, he was living in the Brislington area of Bristol, sharing a house with comedian Mat Ewins.
