= Elis James and John Robins =

British comedy duo

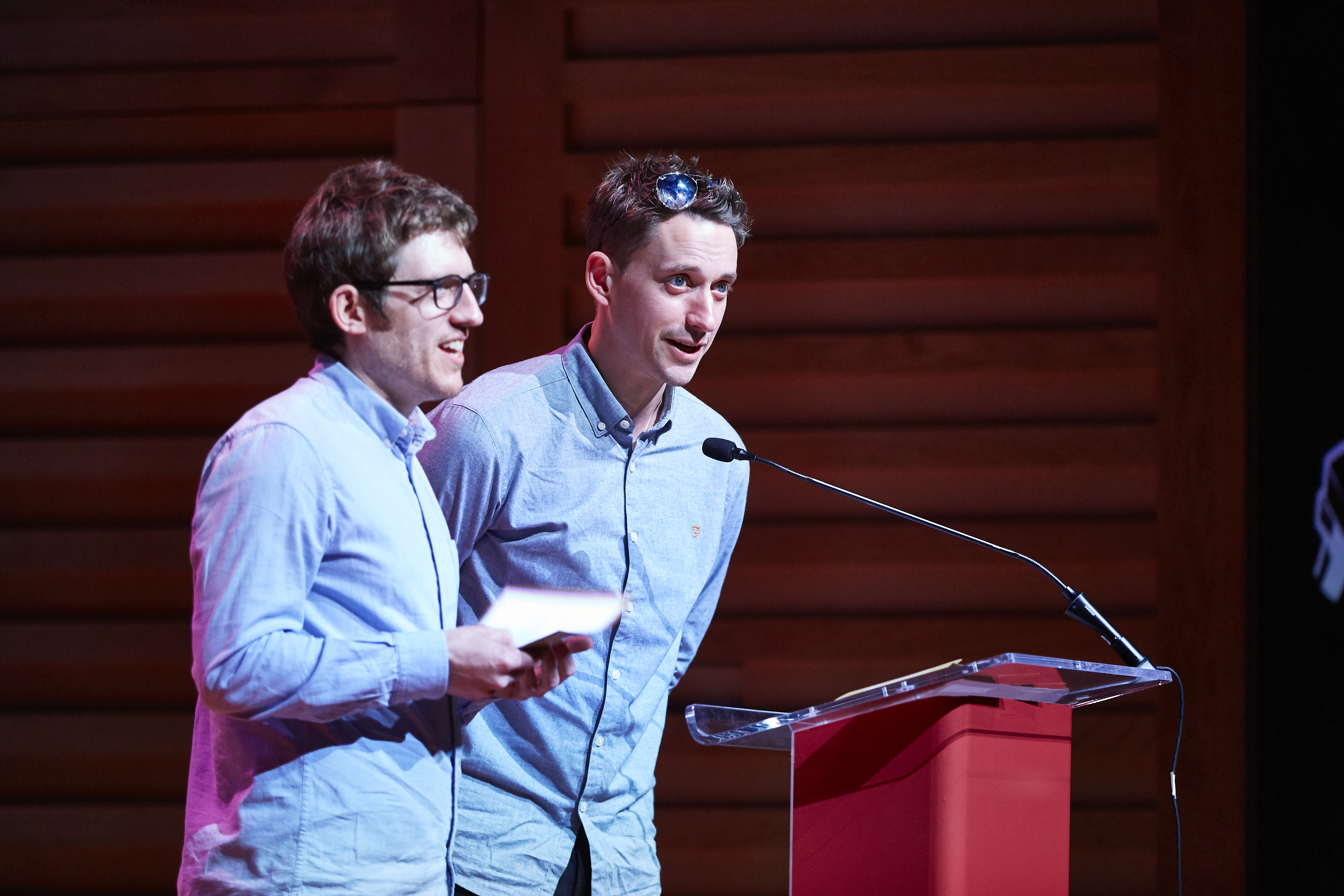
- James and Robins at the 2018 British Podcast Awards
- Genre: Comedy, chat
- Running time: 180 minutes (Xfm and Radio X, 2014–2019); 120 minutes (BBC Radio 5 Live, 2019–2023); 60 minutes (BBC Radio 5 Live, 2024-present)
- Country of origin: UK
- Language: English
- Home station: Xfm London (2014–2015); Radio X (2015–2019); BBC Radio 5 Live (2019–present)
- Syndicates: Podcast available on Apple Podcasts, Spotify and BBC Sounds
- Hosted by: Elis James; John Robins
- Produced by: Dave Masterman (2014–2017, 2019–present); Vinay Joshi (2017–2019)
- Recording studio: Global Radio, Leicester Square, London (2014–2019); Broadcasting House, London (2019–present); Maida Vale Studios, London (2021)
- Other studios: The Comedy Store, Soho, London (One-off, 250th episode special recorded with a live studio audience in 2018); James and Robins's homes (temporarily during the 2020-2021 COVID-19 pandemic)
- Original release: 16 February 2014 – present
- Audio format: Stereophonic sound
- Website: elisandjohn.com Formerly: Elis James and John Robins - Radio - Radio X, Elis James and John Robins on BBC Radio 5 Live
- Podcast: The Elis James and John Robins on Radio X Podcast, Elis James and John Robins on BBC 5 Live podcast

Elis James and John Robins is a weekly radio show and bi-weekly podcast presented by British comedians Elis James and John Robins. Formerly broadcast on commercial radio station Radio X, the show aired on BBC Radio 5 Live on Friday afternoons until the end of 2023. The show was also released as a weekly podcast from BBC Sounds with a specially-recorded intro. From 6 February 2024, the show changed formats to two weekly podcasts, with a one-hour highlights broadcast on 5 Live on Friday afternoons – a change nicknamed "The Great Reset". In 2026, James and Robins, alongside long time producer Dave Masterman, established Significant Productions, a production company for the show and other projects, such as The Socially Distant Sports Bar and How Do You Cope? With John Robins.

Robins has described the show as "a commercial indie radio show that has got wildly out of hand".

== History ==
James and Robins have been friends since meeting on the comedy circuit in 2005 and had discussed making a radio show together. Xfm had a tradition of having weekend shows hosted by male comedians and after their agent submitted a demo, James and Robins were granted a weekend slot, following in the footsteps of Ricky Gervais & Stephen Merchant, Adam and Joe, Jimmy Carr, Russell Brand and Josh Widdicombe. The Elis James and John Robins show debuted on Xfm London on Sunday 16 February 2014 in the 10:00am–1:00pm slot and was produced by Dave Masterman. The show moved to a Saturday 10:00am–1:00pm slot on 17 August 2014 before moving to Saturday afternoons from 1:00pm–4:00pm on 23 April 2016. Xfm rebranded as Radio X and began broadcasting nationwide in September 2015. Following Dave Masterman's departure from Radio X in April 2017, Vinay Joshi, who had worked on the show as an unpaid intern in 2014 before becoming a permanent producer at Radio X, and had more recently been alternating production duties with Masterman, took over as lead producer.

Elis and John covered the weekday drive time slot (4:00pm–7:00pm) on 2–6 January 2017, 6–17 March 2017, 10–13 April 2017 and 22 May-9 June 2017.

It was revealed on 27 March 2019 that James and Robins were leaving Radio X and the show would be ending after five years on air, stating that they had "not left under a cloud of unproduceability".

On 2 April 2019, it was announced that James and Robins would begin broadcasting on BBC Radio 5 Live on Friday 31 May, reuniting with Masterman. The new show aired from 1:00pm–3:00pm on Fridays, before moving to a 2:00pm–4:00pm slot, and features a number of segments carried over from the Radio X show, such as "John's Shame Well" and "Made Up Games", as well as new features, chat and anecdotes. With no music or advert breaks on Radio 5 Live, almost the entire show was released in a weekly podcast, with an additional intro recorded for it. Since February 2020, various mid-week bonus episodes have been recorded and released on the podcast feed, especially during the COVID-19 pandemic, when the two recorded a series of podcasts called "The Isolation Tapes" while unable to broadcast their regular show.

In February 2024, the show changed formats again, to two weekly podcasts, with a highlights show broadcast on BBC Radio 5 Live on Friday afternoons, and in 2026, after the establishment of 'Significant Productions', the show re-negotiated its contract with the BBC to allow commercialisation of the podcast on non BBC sounds platforms, and a subscription tier for listeners on Patreon. This new tier also saw the introduction of a monthly video series: 'The Adventures of Elis and John', and a YouTube channel of show highlights.

== Format ==
The Radio X show traditionally opened with Robins introducing James with a dubious fact based on his Welsh heritage, for example:

I am John Robins, and to my left is Abergavenny's most decorated mime, Mr Elis James.

On the Radio 5 Live show, James and Robins share the opening in alternate weeks, usually performing a scripted opening taking a humorous angle on current affairs, the BBC or other 5 Live presenters.

At Radio X, John would usually lead the main links during the show with Elis co-hosting. The show is mainly conversational and comedic with anecdotes based around John's obsessions (Frank Zappa, the rock band Queen, farthing collecting, bushcraft, session ales, pubs, Bristol, golf) and Elis's obsessions (the Wales football team, Swansea City, the past, Welsh Socialism, Gorky's Zygotic Mynci, Super Furry Animals) forming a backbone of material. The producer regularly joins in with conversation.

=== Show features ===
- Made Up Games – Listeners send in details of games they have invented with family or friends and Elis and John play some of them live on air. The winner of the game wins the right to play a music track of their choice. In its current format, theme songs are provided by listeners, and wins are tallied using the tennis scoring system.
- The Cymru Connection – A Welsh listener calls in and Elis has to identify a mutual connection between the two of them within one minute. Following a failed performance, Elis was banned from competing in the feature for three weeks, causing significant consternation among fans.
- John Wins Again – John is asked about his recent wins and losses (e.g. "winning" a better credit score, "losing" by being unable to pick up pre-bought foreign currency), in the hope his ratio is positive at the end of each segment.
- Mad Dads – Elis and John read out listener stories about dads doing weird, strange, or unbelievable things.
- John's Shame Well – John reads emails from listeners confessing actions in the past that have caused anxiety and regret ever since.
- Common Zense – John introduces Elis to an ancient proverb, in the hope Elis will gain wisdom from it.
- Rapid Response Unit – A responsive segment where Dave fires up the podcast listeners to send in their preferences or thoughts on a specific topic, e.g. panini fillings, how many T-shirts you own, or longest relationship with a person, item, or service provider.

=== Retired features ===
- Petty Parliament – Listeners offer up daily occurrences that annoy them, and a potentially suitable punishment. Elis, John, and Dave all vote on whether it passes.
- Hot Chat (formerly Email Of The Species and Are You On Email) – A segment of the show where Elis and John read out and respond to listener correspondence via the increasingly popular medium of email.
- Call a Comedian – A guest stand-up comedian provides advice for a listener's problem.
- Cool Club – Elis and John discuss listener nominations for things to be included in Cool Club, e.g. Tenderstem broccoli, graphite grey, horticulture, bespoke board games, and having a good lean.
- Unsung Hero – Elis and John interview a person who has done something extraordinary that would otherwise not have been reported in the media. During the Coronavirus pandemic, this changed to individuals who helped in some way during the pandemic.
- Voicenote of the UK – An irregular feature launched in late 2021 in which listeners would send in voicenotes to the show via WhatsApp. The voicenote Elis and John deemed most impressive would then be played on the show. A catchy jingle, composed and sung by producer Dave Masterman, accompanied the feature.
- Ask John – Listeners ask John a question, such as the best way to fill a dishwasher. John will then answer these questions using only the power of his mind.
- Up Your Region – Elis reads his favourite local stories from newspapers.
- Around The World In 80 Daves – Each week a different person named Dave (or David, Davina, etc.) is interviewed about their life in different parts of the world.
- Edgy Elis – Elis would pick a controversial opinion at random from a bag of opinions composed by John. Elis then launched into an often absurd rant inspired by the chosen opinion.
- The Good-Deed Feed – Elis and John read out good deeds that listeners send in to lighten up the COVID-19 lockdown.
- Potato Potato – John and Elis continually say the word "potato" to each other like a game of tennis. The person who said "birdseye" at the right time won. The correct time to say "birdseye" was decided by the game's general vibe. This would take place before playing a Made Up Game.
- The Potato Potato Years – In a mocking response to listener emails that Potato Potato was no longer funny and should be retired, Elis and John did retire the feature but replaced it with 'The Potato Potato Years' — playing recordings of old Potato Potato games multiple times while "analysing" them at deliberately extreme length, in a parody of British television programmes analysing past sports highlights.
- Clarkson's hyperbole – Elis selects and reads out excerpts of the top passages written by newspaper columnists.
- Humblebrag Of The Week – Longest running feature in the show's history. John and Elis read out brags on social media disguised as moans. The feature has been adapted to Humblebrag Of The Day when the duo have stood in for Johnny Vaughan on the weekday drive-time show.
- Tick Off A Taste – Elis and John taste live on air a food item that has been sent in by listeners.
- The Light Hearted Paper Review with Elis James – Elis, backgrounded by muzak, reads absurd or pointless local, national and international news stories from the week.
- John Googles The Traffic – A feature used during Elis and John's stand-in coverage of Johnny Vaughan's drivetime slot where John uses search engine Google to help listeners avoid traffic build-ups on their commute home, interspersed with various absurd sound effects.
- John's Gig Diaries – Excerpts from John's diary from when he first started comedy (circa 2005–2006).
- Welsh Word of the Week – Elis picks and explains one of his favourite words from the Welsh language.
- Sacred Cow – A musical artist or band would be discussed for either entrance to the 'paddock of the sacred cow' and earn their right to be critically acclaimed, or be banished to the 'abattoir' for over-hyped music acts.
- Winner Plays On – Elis and John would face five questions each on their chosen subject, with the winner awarded the right to play a music track of their choosing.
- Textual Healing – Listeners would email or call in with a comedic problem for the lads to solve. Calls were taken live on air and sometimes featured comedians in disguise.
- Teenage Fanclub – A short-lived feature where Elis and John invited listeners to write in about tales of teenage bands and music fandom.
- John Reads Aloud From Tony Blackburn's Autobiography – John read excerpts from Tony Blackburn's autobiography Poptastic! My Life In Radio, mocking the book's pomposity, banality and lack of self awareness.
- A Robins Amongst The Pigeons – John read from his autobiography 'A Robins Amongst The Pigeons', a parody of Tony Blackburn's 'Poptastic! My Life In Radio'.
- Judge Robins – John assumes the character of Judge Robins and rules on a dilemma submitted by a listener, dispensing what he believes to be a suitable punishment.
- Elis' Gig Diaries – Excerpts from Elis' diary from when he first started comedy.
- Super Texts (and tweets) – John's naming of a segment to cover responses to tweets and texts with a jingle set to the theme tune of children's cartoon series SuperTed.
- Every Cloud – Tales of the small everyday things that had given listeners a reason to be cheerful (dubbed 'Silver Linings' by Elis).
- BetaBet – A replacement for long-running feature 'Winner Plays On'. John and Elis compete to name as many examples as possible of a chosen subject in alphabetical order in 30 seconds. Eventually retired because John consistently won.
- Anecdote and a Punchline – Spontaneous feature devised by John live on air but recurring several times. Elis begins telling an anecdote as part of a different segment of the show, loses his thread, loses confidence in the story or realises he's told the story before, and John plays a jingle mocking Elis' poor storytelling skills.
- Backing Britain – Listeners submit voicenotes in which they list things that are great about Britain. This feature responded to producer Dave Masterman, who was jokingly accused of not backing Britain.
- Riff Symposium – Occasional feature where Elis and John perform improv comedy around a topic given to them by Producer Dave.
- Britain's Sexiest Tattoo – Elis and John rate tattoos sent in by listeners on a scale of 1-5 following a short discussion.
- World Heritage Accents – Elis and John's favourite accents from around the world (e.g. Mississippi, Sunderland, wise Japanese) are pitched against one another to establish those worthy of UNESCO-level status.

== Podcast ==
Since the show began, a podcast of the show has been released soon after broadcast. The podcast begins with an introduction from Elis and John that has evolved into a response to email correspondence with regular podcast listeners, styled by Elis and John as PCDs (Podcast Devotees). Podcast listeners who have listened since the start of the podcast release have been named 'Oners' and listeners who have been late adopters but have listened to the whole back catalogue have been named 'Retro-Oners'. In correspondence listeners announce themselves via their status (Oner/Retro-Oner), and indicate when they started listening to the podcast (i.e. a '34er' for someone who started listening at Episode 34).

Following the highlights of the radio broadcast Elis and John return for a closing segment called the "Keep It Session Sessions". In this segment they take turns to play a sample of a band or artist that they recommend or may have mentioned during a show.

In total, there are 264 "proper" episodes of the podcast from the Radio X show, plus a number of bonus episodes from when Elis and John covered other slots in the Radio X schedule. When Elis and John started a new show on BBC Radio 5 Live in May 2019, it marked the start of a new podcast beginning at Episode 1.

=== How Do You Cope ===
In October 2019 Elis and John launched a new podcast How Do You Cope?...with Elis and John on 5 Live. It features Elis and John talking to celebrities about mental health issues they have faced. Up to 2023, there have been four series of the show.

In February 2025 it was announced that How Do You Cope? would continue on the podcast platform Wondery, in an iteration hosted by John alone. John explained Elis's departure in an edition of his online newsletter: "It’s just Johnny JR on the new show as Elis, God love him, has c. 48 podcasts at time of going to press and also a Welsh-Language Stand-Up special".

== Live shows ==
Following the broadcast of the A Robins Amongst the Pigeons book, live readings were played at selected venues in 2015. In late 2016 Elis and John took a version of their show on a tour of England, Scotland and Wales. Named The Elis James and John Robins Experience, the show began in October in Norwich and finished in the Kentish Town Forum in November. Listeners who have attended the live shows have been christened 'live vibe tasters'. Upon releasing their book, The Holy Vible, the pair undertook a nationwide book tour, including an extended show at the Hammersmith Apollo featuring former producer Dave Masterman and Nish Kumar. On 28 July 2018, Elis and John broadcast the radio show live from the Kendal Calling music festival, which was put out as episode 230 of the podcast. It was announced that the 250th episode of the radio show would be broadcast in front of a live audience at the Comedy Store London on 22 December 2018.

On 26 April 2020, during the Coronavirus lockdown in the UK, Elis and John live-streamed An Evening With Elis and John (hosted by fellow comedian Ivo Graham), each broadcasting from their respective homes. The broadcast was a light-hearted “look back at their life, work, loves, regrets and cans”. This became a regular livestream gig during the lockdowns, with several further livestreams around New Year's Eve.

== Awards ==
The show won the Chortle Radio award on 20 March 2017. In 2020, the show won a Gold Award at the Audio and Radio Industry Awards for "Funniest Show".

The show's sister podcast on BBC Radio 5 Live, How Do You Cope?...with Elis and John, won the Broadcasting Press Guild award for best podcast in 2021.

The pair won "Moment of the Year" at the UK Audio and Radio Industry Awards 2024 for an episode of How Do You Cope?...with Elis and John in which John spoke about his struggle with alcohol addiction and his ongoing recovery.
