= Janice Forsyth =

Canadian sociologist

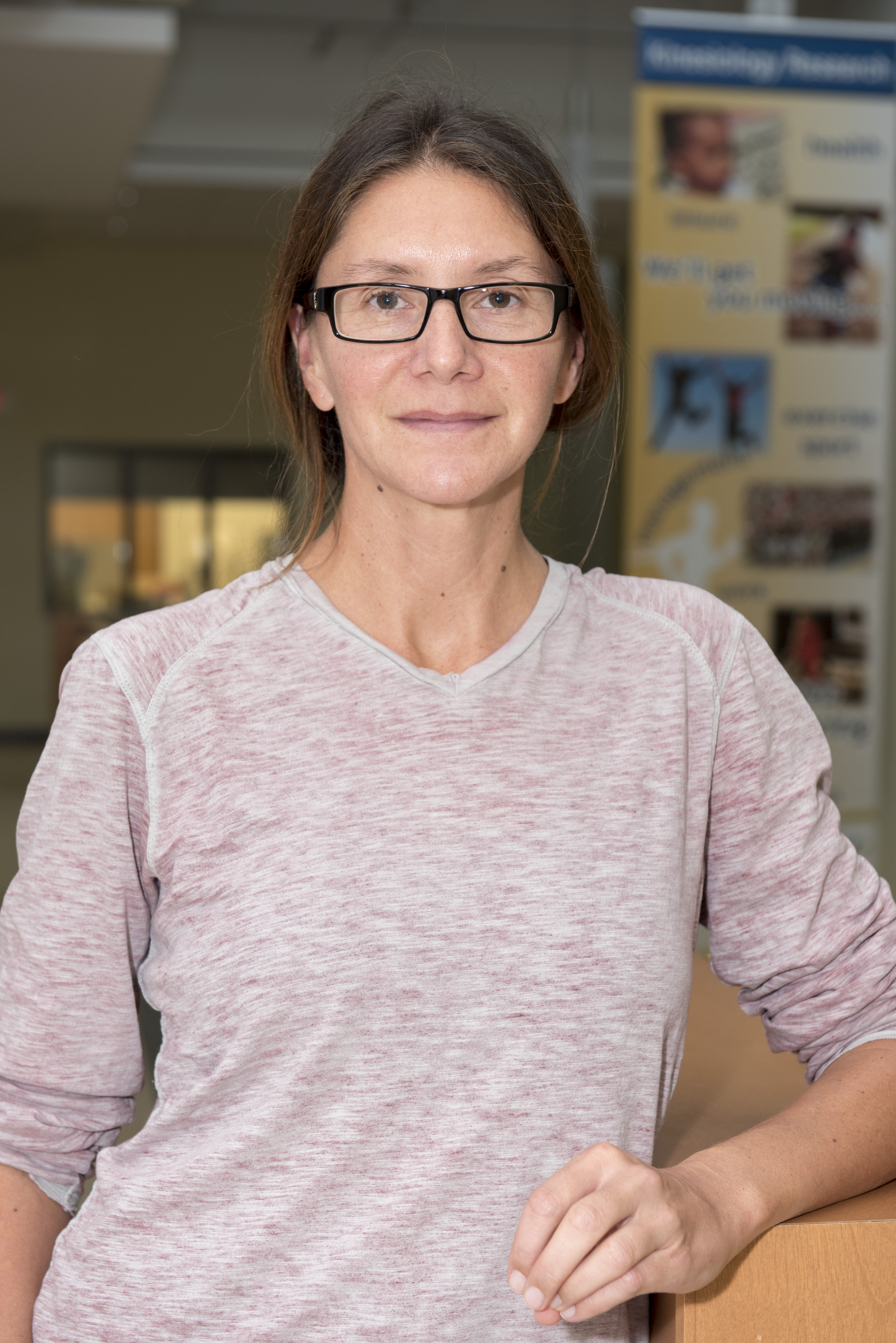
- Janice Forsyth (2017)
- Born: Toronto, Ontario

Academic background
- Education: University of Western Ontario
- Website: janiceforsyth.ca

Janice Forsyth is a Canadian sociologist. She is an associate professor of Sociology and the director of the Indigenous Studies program at Western University in London, Ontario. A former varsity athlete Forsyth was awarded the Tom Longboat Regional Award for Ontario in 2002.

== Early life and education ==
Forsyth was born in Toronto, Ontario and grew up in Northern Ontario. Her maternal family is from the Fisher River Cree and Peguis First Nation, Manitoba, Canada.

Forsyth has three degrees from Western University, where she completed a BA in 1997, a MA in 2000, and a PhD in 2005. Forsyth studied the Socio-Cultural Study of Sport for her PhD degree. While studying at Western, she was a varsity athlete, and won several athletic awards from Western University. She medalled in badminton at the Ontario University Athletics Championships and won silver in the 3000 metres at their 1995 Track & Field Championship. In 2002 that Forsyth received the Tom Longboat Regional Award for Ontario at the North American Indigenous Games.

== Career ==
After graduating, she was an assistant professor at the University of Manitoba from 2005 to 2008 and at the University of Alberta from 2008 to 2009. In 2010, she returned Western University as an associate professor in the Faculty of Health Sciences, serving as director for the International Centre for Olympic Studies at Western until 2015. Her areas of research include the Olympic Games, Canadian Residential Schools, equity issues in Canadian sport, and Aboriginal sport and health. In 2020 Forsyth's book Reclaiming Tom Longboat: Indigenous Self-Determination in Canadian Sport was published by the University of Regina Press. The book argues that the award, named after Onondaga long-distance runner Tom Longboat, has been used to advance colonial policies and political agendas. The political aspect of Indigenous sport is a common theme in Forsyth's work, explaining in a 2018 interview with the University of Manitoba that: "Sport is not value-free. Built into it are ways of prioritizing values and beliefs that may not be part of Indigenous cultural heritage."

Outside of academia Forsyth has written articles for news sources such as HuffPost Canada and The Guardian, as well as being interviewed by multiple media outlets such as the Toronto Star, SportsNet, the Globe and Mail, CBC, and the Aboriginal People's Television Network.

Through 2017, she has been leading discussions around sport and reconciliation, stemming from the Truth and Reconciliation Commission of Canada reports (released in 2015), with government and non-profit sectors in sport, physical activity, physical education, and health.

== Awards ==
In 2013, Forsyth was awarded the NASSH Book of the Year Award for Best Anthology for Aboriginal Peoples and Sport in Canada: Historical Foundations and Contemporary Issues , which she co-edited with Audrey Giles from the University of Ottawa, and the Early Researcher Award/Premier's Research Excellence Award from the Ontario Ministry of Economic Development & Innovation. In 2015, she was named the winner for best paper published in the journal Sport History for her article "Make the Indian Understand his Place: Politics and the Establishment of the Tom Longboat Awards at Indian Affairs and the Amateur Athletic Union of Canada."

== Selected publications ==
- Forsyth, J. & Wamsley, K. (2006). ‘Native to Native we'll recapture our spirits’: The World Indigenous Nations Games and the North American Indigenous Games as cultural resistance. International Journal of History of Sport, 23(2), 294–314.
- Forsyth, J. (2007). The Indian Act and the (re)shaping of Canadian Aboriginal sport practices. International Journal of Canadian Studies, 35, 95–111.
- Forsyth, J. & Wamsley, K. (2005). Symbols without substance: Aboriginal peoples and the illusion of Olympic ceremonies. In K. Young & K. Wamsley (Eds.), Global Olympics: Historical Foundations and Sociological Studies of the Modern Games (pp. 227–247). Oxford, UK: Elsevier Press.
- Forsyth, J. (2005). After the fur trade: First Nations women in Canadian history, 1850–1950. Atlantis, 29(2), 69–78.
- Forsyth, J. (2013). Bodies of meaning: Sports and games at Canadian residential schools. In J. Forsyth & A. Giles (Eds.), Aboriginal Peoples and Sport in Canada: Historical Foundations and Contemporary Issues (pp. 15–34). Vancouver, BC: UBC Press.
- Forsyth, J. (2020). Reclaiming Tom Longboat: Indigenous self-determination in Canada sport. University of Regina Press.
