= Matt Forde =

English impressionist, television writer, and radio presenter

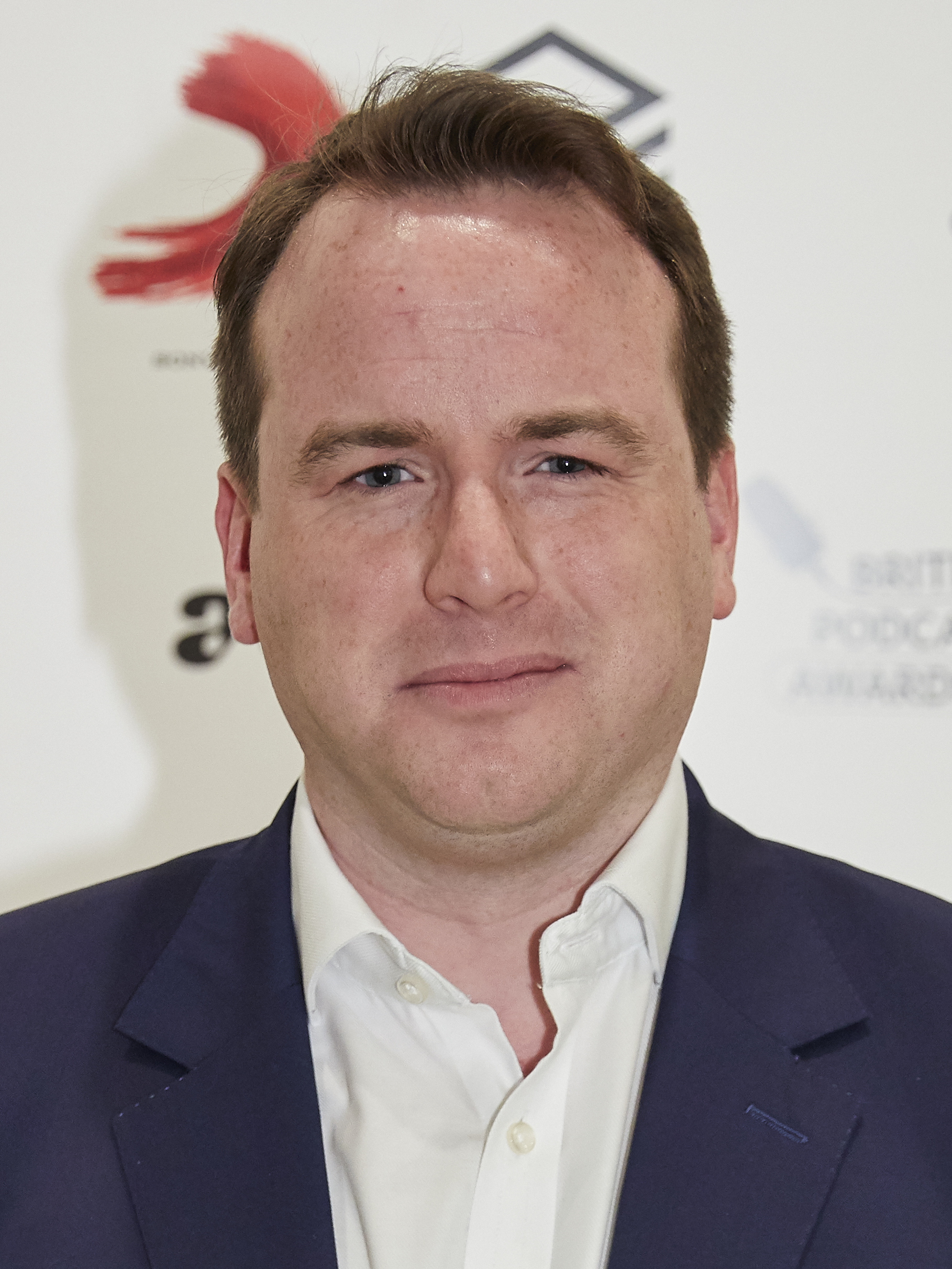
- Forde in 2018
- Born: 6 November 1980 (age 45); Nottingham, Nottinghamshire, England
- Occupations: Writer; comedian; presenter; podcast host; impressionist
- Website: www.mattforde.com

Matt Forde (born 6 November 1980) is an English comedian, impressionist, writer, and presenter.

== Early life ==
Forde's mother is a former nun. He attended Becket School in West Bridgford, Nottingham, where he gained English, History, and Economics A-levels in 1999.

== Career ==
=== Politics ===
Obsessed with politics from the age of nine, Forde originally joined the Socialist Workers Party. He subsequently worked for the Labour Party as an organiser and adviser from 2004 until 2009. Having become a Blairite, he left politics around the time of the election of Jeremy Corbyn as Labour leader in 2015, because he wanted to concentrate on his comedy career full-time and he did not like the direction the party was taking.

=== Comedy and broadcasting ===
Forde regularly broadcast with Russell Howard and Jon Richardson on their shows on BBC Radio 6 (2007–2010). Forde has made six seasons of Unspun with Matt Forde, a topical political show on Dave. In August 2018, Forde became host of Absolute Radio's Rock 'N' Roll Football with fellow Nottingham Forest fan Matt Dyson. On Spitting Image, Forde voiced Donald Trump, Boris Johnson, and Keir Starmer.

Forde wrote the memoir Politically Homeless, published by Quercus Books in 2020.

Forde co-hosts the podcast British Scandal with Alice Levine, Down the Dog with Jon Richardson, and also hosts The Political Party.

In 2022, Forde held a live comedy tour titled "Clowns to the Left of Me, Jokers to the Right".

Forde performed his "The End of an Era Tour," and did the Royal Variety Performance for the second time in December 2024.

Forde's political comedy chat show, The Matt Forde Focus Group, has been broadcast on BBC Radio 4 since 2025.

== Personal life ==
Forde married his partner Laura in 2023.

In October 2023, Forde announced via his Twitter account that he would be undergoing surgery for a spine tumour. The base of his spine was removed during the surgery and he had to use walking sticks while readjusting to walking again.
