= Russell Howard =

British comedian and presenter (born 1980)

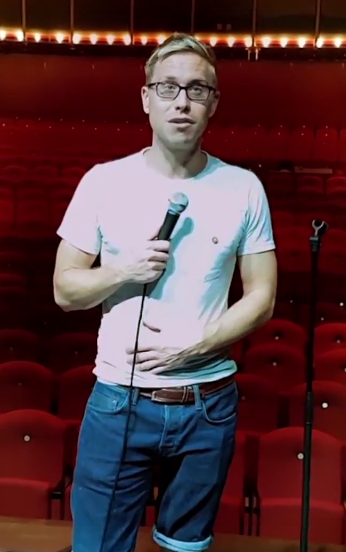
- Howard in 2017
- Born: 23 March 1980 (age 46); Bath, England
- Education: UWE Bristol (BA (Hons))
- Spouse: Cerys Morgan (m. 2019)
- Children: 2 (Note: One deceased)

Comedy career
- Years active: 1999–present
- Medium: Stand-up, television, radio
- Genres: Social satire; observational comedy; surreal humour
- Website: russell-howard.co.uk

Russell Howard (born 23 March 1980) is an English comedian, television presenter, radio presenter and actor. He has hosted his own television shows, Russell Howard's Good News and The Russell Howard Hour, and appeared on the topical panel TV show Mock the Week. He won "Best Compère" at the 2006 Chortle Awards and was nominated for an Edinburgh Comedy Award for his 2006 Edinburgh Festival Fringe show. Howard has cited comedians Lee Evans, Richard Pryor, and Frank Skinner as influences.

== Early life ==
Howard was born in Bath, Somerset, and raised in nearby Radstock, Somerset. His parents are Dave and Ninette Howard. He has two younger siblings, twins Kerry and Daniel (born 1982). Daniel has epilepsy, to which Howard sometimes refers during his act.

Howard attended Bedford Modern School, Hanham High School, Perins School in New Alresford and Alton College. He later studied economics at the University of the West of England.

== Career ==
=== TV and radio work ===
In 2004, he was commissioned by BBC Radio 1 to write, sing and perform on the comedy series The Milk Run. Howard has also appeared on the shows Banter (hosted by Andrew Collins) and Political Animal for BBC Radio 4.

Until 2010, Howard was a regular panelist on Mock the Week. He has also appeared on 8 Out of 10 Cats, Would I Lie to You?, Live at the Apollo, The Secret Policeman's Ball 2008, Law of the Playground and Never Mind the Buzzcocks (Series 18, Episode 2; Series 20, Episode 4; Series 27, Episode 2; Series 30, Episode 1).

Howard frequently worked with other members of the Chocolate Milk Gang, a group of comedians who often collaborated and performed with one another, including Daniel Kitson, John Oliver, David O'Doherty, and Alun Cochrane. Howard shares Oliver's adoration of Liverpool F.C.

He was one of several comedians picked as the best comedy talent from the 2005 Edinburgh Festival Fringe that recorded 10–15-minute spots for the "Edinburgh and Beyond" show which was aired on Paramount Comedy 1 in the autumn of 2006. The show was filmed at the Bloomsbury Theatre. From 2009, he took over as compère of this show from Al Murray.

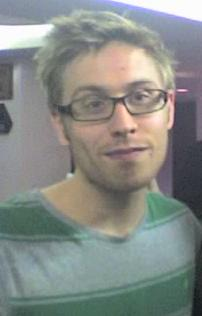
Howard at the Palace Theatre, Westcliff-on-Sea

From November 2006 to July 2008, Russell co-hosted The Russell Howard Show on BBC Radio 6 Music with fellow comedian Jon Richardson in a Sunday morning slot previously hosted by Russell Brand. The show continued to air, without Howard, until March 2010. He has since explained that his main reason for leaving the show was that he finds radio "really restrictive" and "I gorge off the audience as a performer, but you can't gauge a reaction on the radio."

Russell was commissioned to make a comedy show called Russell Howard's Good News, aimed at under-25s, for BBC Three. The first episode aired on 22 October 2009 and the show ran for ten series as well as a "best of" show and a Christmas Special. It went on to become BBC Three's highest ever rating entertainment series. In the show, he gave his take on the week's major news stories, as well as giving attention to some of the more light-hearted stories of the week. Two more series of the show were commissioned, with the second series starting on 25 March 2010. A seventh series began on 27 September 2012 on BBC Three. Series 8 began on 25 April 2013 on BBC Three, and series 9 started broadcast in its new home on BBC Two in October 2014.

Russell Howard's Good News was voted the Best Ever BBC Three show on 9 February 2013 as part of the channel's 10th birthday celebrations.

Howard made his United States television debut on the 3 August 2011 episode of Conan. Howard guest-hosted the second episode of the 27th series of Never Mind the Buzzcocks on 30 September 2013.

In November 2013, Howard made a surprise appearance in the North East market town Barnard Castle to preview his latest tour show, Wonderbox.

From 2015 to 2016, Howard presented a show called Russell Howard's Stand Up Central which broadcasts on Comedy Central. However, in 2017 due to tour commitments, Howard was unable to present the show's third series and was replaced by Chris Ramsey. In 2015, he appeared on The Tonight Show Starring Jimmy Fallon where he performed some stand-up.

In December 2015, Howard made his acting debut in BBC Two's hour-long comedy-drama A Gert Lush Christmas, which he also co-wrote. In the film, Howard played Dan Colman, who takes his girlfriend to meet his family in Bristol for Christmas. The film also co-starred Howard's sister Kerry, who played Dan's sister Julie. On 10 March 2016, Howard appeared on the BBC 1 panel show Room 101.

In March 2016, Howard attacked Conservative MP Philip Davies on his BBC show calling him an "arsehole", "windbag", "wanker" and a "toad-faced hypocrite", accusing the MP of filibustering (talking out a bill). Davies complained on the grounds of "inaccuracy" and "misrepresentation" and the BBC was forced to publish in the Clarifications and Corrections section of the BBC website stating "Davies did not personally use up all the time available for the debate and that almost three hours remained after he sat down". Howard was also found to have misrepresented Davies' views on disabled people and the BBC noted "that the programme did not fully represent his comments, which were, that it would be in the best interests of disabled people, and others, to be allowed to offer to work for less than the minimum wage, if the alternative were no employment at all". The broadcaster also agreed not to air the episode again due to their misrepresentation of Davies' position. The BBC Trust later rejected a further escalation of the complaint by Davies.

Starting in October 2016, Howard presented a travel documentary series for Comedy Central called Russell Howard & Mum: USA Road Trip which involved him and his mother Ninette travelling through America.

On 29 November 2016, it was announced that Howard would write and star in a 14-part weekly comedy series entitled The Russell Howard Hour on Sky One in 2017, as part of a two-year deal with Sky. The series began on 21 September 2017 and ran until 22 December 2022.

Howard stated in January 2025 that he would no longer work on television and would instead focus on his stand-up tours and podcasts. Nevertheless, in 2026, Howard returned to Mock the Week as a recurring panelist in the programme's revival series on TLC.

=== Live comedy ===
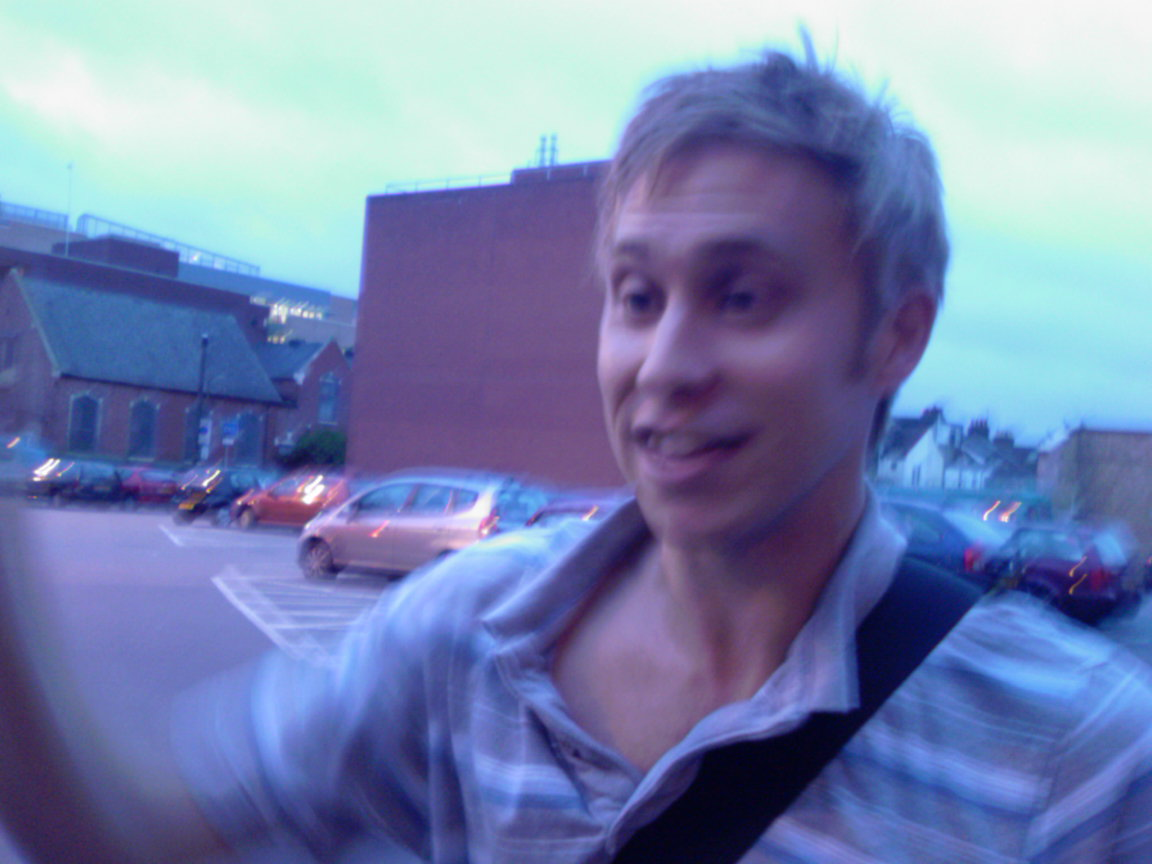
Howard before a gig at the New Wimbledon Theatre, London

A show from his 2007 Adventures tour was released on DVD on 17 November 2008, under the title "Russell Howard Live". The show on the DVD was recorded at The Bloomsbury Theatre.

Howard started touring for his show Dingledodies in September 2008 and played various dates through to December. Due to overwhelming demand he further extended the tour twice into 2009. It sold in excess of 125,000 tickets, including three sell-out shows at the Hammersmith Apollo as well as several large arenas such as Wembley Arena and Manchester's MEN Arena. The DVD of this tour was released on 9 November 2009 and features a recording of the show from the Brighton Dome.

Howard was named "Best Theatre Show" at the 2009 Chortle Comedy Awards. Howard appeared in UK dates in December 2009 for his "Big Rooms and Belly Laughs" tour. Right Here Right Now, his 2011 arena tour, sold out.

The Independent reported that Howard earned £4 million in 2009 alone, which he denies.

On 23 April 2013, Howard confirmed that he would be performing a stand-up tour called Wonderbox starting in February 2014 with dates in Britain, Ireland, the United States, Australia and New Zealand. The tour was released on DVD in November 2014. This was further extended to include more UK dates in December 2014.

In November 2015, Howard announced that he would be doing a fifth stand-up tour in February to July 2017 called Round The World where he would tour Europe including the United Kingdom and Ireland as well as Australia, New Zealand and America. In advance of the tour, Howard planned to memorise the capital city of every country in the world alphabetically, in order to recite the full list at the start of each performance.

From September 2019 to September 2020, Howard was scheduled to do his sixth stand-up tour Respite, appearing in the United Kingdom, Ireland, Europe, Canada, America, Australia and New Zealand (as planned before the COVID-19 pandemic).

== Personal life ==
When Howard's career began to take off, he took up residence in Leamington Spa. Howard now lives in London with his wife Cerys, their son (born 2024), and their dog, a Jack Russell Terrier named Archie.

The couple had a second son, Felix, who died shortly after birth in 2026. In his memory, Howard registered The Felix Foundation, a charity aimed towards those affected by neonatal death.

Howard appeared at Friends of the Earth's LIVEstock comedy and music event at the Hammersmith Apollo in support of the green campaign group's Food Chain Campaign for planet-friendly farming, on 12 November 2009.

Howard has said he is "deadly serious" about football, and has supported Liverpool since he was ten. "I still go down the pub and play football with my mates", he commented in 2010.

In April 2010, Howard ran the London Marathon for the first time with both his brother and sister, to raise money for Epilepsy Society. He completed the 26-mile course in 4 hours and 15 minutes, beating his target time of 5 hours. Sponsorship raised over £7,000.

For Sport Relief 2010, he took part in the BT Sport Relief Million Pound Bike Ride with David Walliams, Jimmy Carr, Fearne Cotton, Miranda Hart, Patrick Kielty and Davina McCall. They cycled from John o' Groats in Scotland to Land's End in England in 4 days trying to raise £1 million.

In November 2011, whilst filming a Mystery Guest segment for Good News, Howard broke his left hand when attempting to do press ups on a stunt chair.

Russell was voted Heat Magazine's "Weird Crush of the Year 2013", with his friend and former flatmate Jon Richardson coming second.

== Stand-up shows ==
Year	Title	Notes
2007	Wandering	
2007–08	Adventures	Released on DVD as Live
2008–09	Dingledodies	
2009	Big Rooms and Belly Laughs	
2011	Right Here Right Now	
2014	Wonderbox	
2017	Round the World	
2019–23	Respite	
2025	Russell Howard Live at the London Palladium	
2026	Russell Howard Don't Tell The Algorithm	

=== DVD releases ===
Title	Released	Notes
Live	17 November 2008	Live at London's Bloomsbury Theatre
Live 2 – Dingledodies	9 November 2009	Live at Brighton's Dome
Right Here Right Now	14 November 2011	Live at London's Hammersmith Apollo
Wonderbox	17 November 2014	Live at Bristol Hippodrome
Recalibrate	19 December 2017	Netflix special Live at Brighton's Dome

== Credits ==
- Mock the Week – BBC Two (2006–2010, 2026) – Panelist
- Never Mind the Buzzcocks – BBC Two (2006, 2007) Sky Max (2022) – Panelist; (2013) – Guest Host
- Rob Brydon's Annually Retentive – BBC Three (2007)
- Would I Lie to You? – BBC One (2007) – Panelist
- Live at the Apollo – BBC One (2007, 2009)
- Law of the Playground – Channel 4 (2008)
- The Secret Policeman's Ball 2008 – Channel 4 (2008)
- 8 Out of 10 Cats – Channel 4 (2008) – Panelist
- Russell Howard's Good News – BBC Three/Two (2009–2015) – Presenter
- The Graham Norton Show – BBC One (2010)
- Conan – TBS (2011)
- Children in Need 2011 – BBC One (2011)
- Jon Richardson: A Little Bit OCD – Channel 4 (2012)
- The Jonathan Ross Show – ITV (2012, 2013, 2016, 2017, 2018, 2019)
- The Big Fat Quiz of the Year – Channel 4 (2012) – Panelist
- Red Nose Day 2013 – BBC One (2013)
- A League of Their Own – Sky 1 (2014) – Panelist
- Gadget Man – Channel 4 (2014)
- Russell Howard's Stand Up Central – Comedy Central (2015–2016) – Presenter
- The Tonight Show Starring Jimmy Fallon – NBC (2015) – Guest Performer
- The Last Leg: Stand Up to Cancer Special – Channel 4 (2015) – Guest
- Alan Davies: As Yet Untitled – Dave (2015) (Series 3, Episode 4)
- A Gert Lush Christmas – BBC Two (2015) – Dan Colman (Also co-writer)
- Room 101 – BBC One (2016) – Guest/Panelist
- Dara O Briain's Go 8 Bit – Dave (2016) – Guest (Series 1 Episode 4)
- Russell Howard & Mum – Comedy Central (2016–present)
- 8 Out of 10 Cats Does Countdown – Channel 4 (2016, 2017) – Contestant (Series 10 episode 7, 2016 Christmas Special, Series 11 Episode 2)
- Michael McIntyre's Big Show – BBC One (2016) – Guest Performer (Series 2 episode 2)
- The Late Late Show with James Corden – CBS (2017) – Guest
- Saturday Kitchen – BBC One (2017) – Guest
- The Russell Howard Hour – Sky Max (2017–2022) – Presenter
- Taskmaster (2018) – Contestant, Series 6
- Sunday Brunch (2018) – Guest (Series 7 episode 38)
- Jon Richardson: Ultimate Worrier – Guest (Series 2 episode 3)
- Russell Howard's Home Time – Sky 1 (2020) – Presenter
- Russell Howard Stands Up to the World – Sky 1 (2021) – Presenter
- Russell Howard: Lubricant – Netflix (2021) – Himself
- A League of Their Own – Sky Max (2022) Guest (Series 17 Episode 5)
- Fantasy Football League – Sky Max (2022) Guest (Series 1 Episode 1)

=== Radio ===
- The Milk Run – BBC Radio 1 (2004)
- Political Animal – BBC Radio 4 (2004)
- Banter – BBC Radio 4 (2005)
- The Russell Howard Show – BBC Radio 6 Music (2006–2008)
- Out to Lunch – BBC Radio 2 (2006–7)
- Russell Howard's Perfect Christmas – BBC Radio 5 Live (2016)

== Other links ==
- Official website
- Russell Howard at IMDb
