= Cold Lasagne Hate Myself 1999 =

Stand-up routine by James Acaster

- Promotional poster
- Starring: James Acaster
- Production company: Turtle Canyon Comedy
- Distributed by: Vimeo
- Release date: 2 March 2021
- Running time: 126 minutes
- Country: United Kingdom
- Language: English

Cold Lasagne Hate Myself 1999 is a stand-up show by British comedian James Acaster. It was toured across the United Kingdom in 2018 and 2019 and recorded as a stand-up special for release on DICE in 2020 and Vimeo in 2021.

In the special, Acaster describes the best year of his lifetime—1999—and the worst—2017. He recounts a disastrous performance on The Great British Bake Off; during the recording, he was jet-lagged and called the Samaritans helpline. Breakups and rejection issues, which he was able to identify in therapy, are recurring themes. Examples include a breakup in which his partner subsequently began a relationship with Rowan Atkinson (known for playing Mr. Bean); a deteriorating relationship with his agent; and a therapist who oversteps Acaster's boundaries.

The routine received critical acclaim, with Acaster receiving the Melbourne International Comedy Festival Award, a Chortle Award and several five-star reviews. Critics praised Acaster's precise wording, absurdism, unexpected punchlines and narrative structure. The performance was named after an anecdote about drunkenly eating cold lasagne that was cut from the final performance. Acaster was surprised at the level of heckling in response to commentary on mental health. A clip of Acaster talking about "edgy" comedians who criticise transgender people went viral when Ricky Gervais and Dave Chappelle released stand-up specials containing these themes.

== Background ==
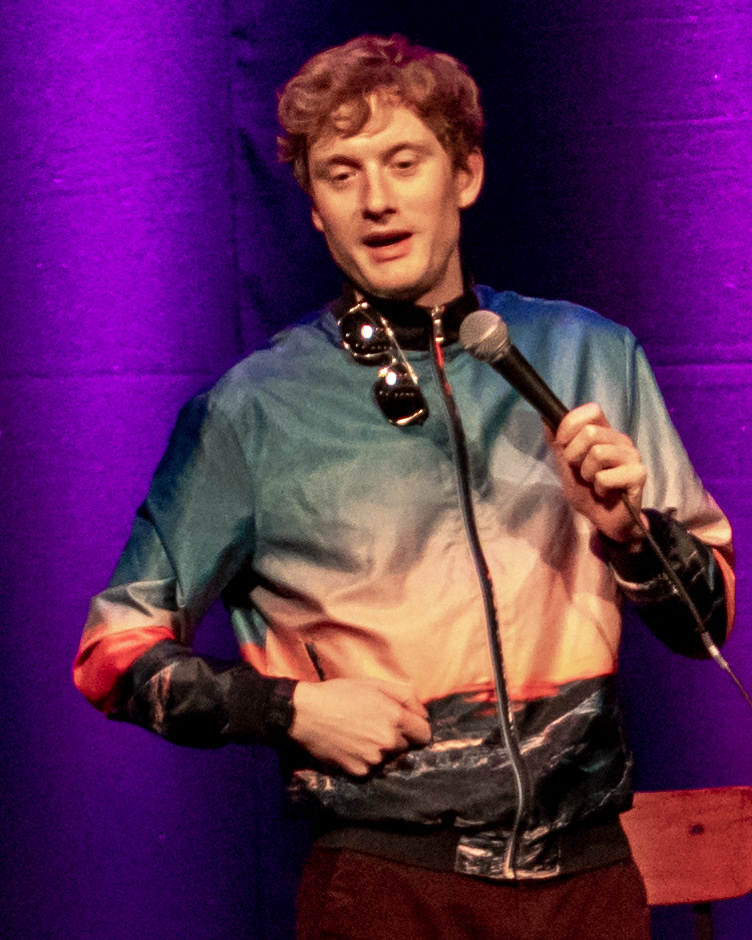
James Acaster, performing with the jacket and sunglasses used in the special

James Acaster is a British comedian born in 1985. He began performing stand-up comedy in 2008, after failing to find success as a drummer. He received five nominations for the Edinburgh Comedy Award for his routines. Preceding Cold Lasagne Hate Myself 1999 was Repertoire (2018)—a four-part Netflix special combining his three previous stand-up tours. According to an interview with Nouse, Acaster continued writing fictional material as he had with Repertoire, but discovered that he wanted to do something different.

The title Cold Lasagne Hate Myself 1999 is largely a reference to jokes that were cut from the final routine. Acaster said in interviews that eating a cold, cooked, Sainsbury's lasagne drunk was the best food he had ever tasted, and after doing so at 4 a.m. he changed a WhatsApp group name to COLD LASAGNE HATE MYSELF 1999. He was asked to name the show the following day.

== Synopsis ==
James Acaster, wearing aviator sunglasses and a sunset jacket, walks out to a stage lit in pink and blue and swears profusely. He despises the audience he has cultivated: old people, Christians and white nerds. He wants to reinvent himself, although not as an "edgy" comedian who insults transgender people, such as Ricky Gervais.

He argues for a "second referendum" on Brexit. Claiming to notice that he is losing his audience, he abruptly changes tack and performs a skit about a person ordering steak in a restaurant—an extended metaphor about a second referendum. The waiter offers the customer "a plate of shit", if they are lucky.

Acaster describes his experience recording The Great British Bake Off in September 2018. Severely jet-lagged and sleep-deprived, he has an outburst that leads the well-meaning crew to act nervously around him. That night, he has a lengthy conversation with his girlfriend that would contribute to their break-up. Still unable to sleep, he calls the Samaritans helpline, pretending to be a baker. His cooking is a disaster and when the episode airs in March 2019, a quote about his flapjacks becomes a meme: "Started making it / Had a breakdown / Bon appétit".

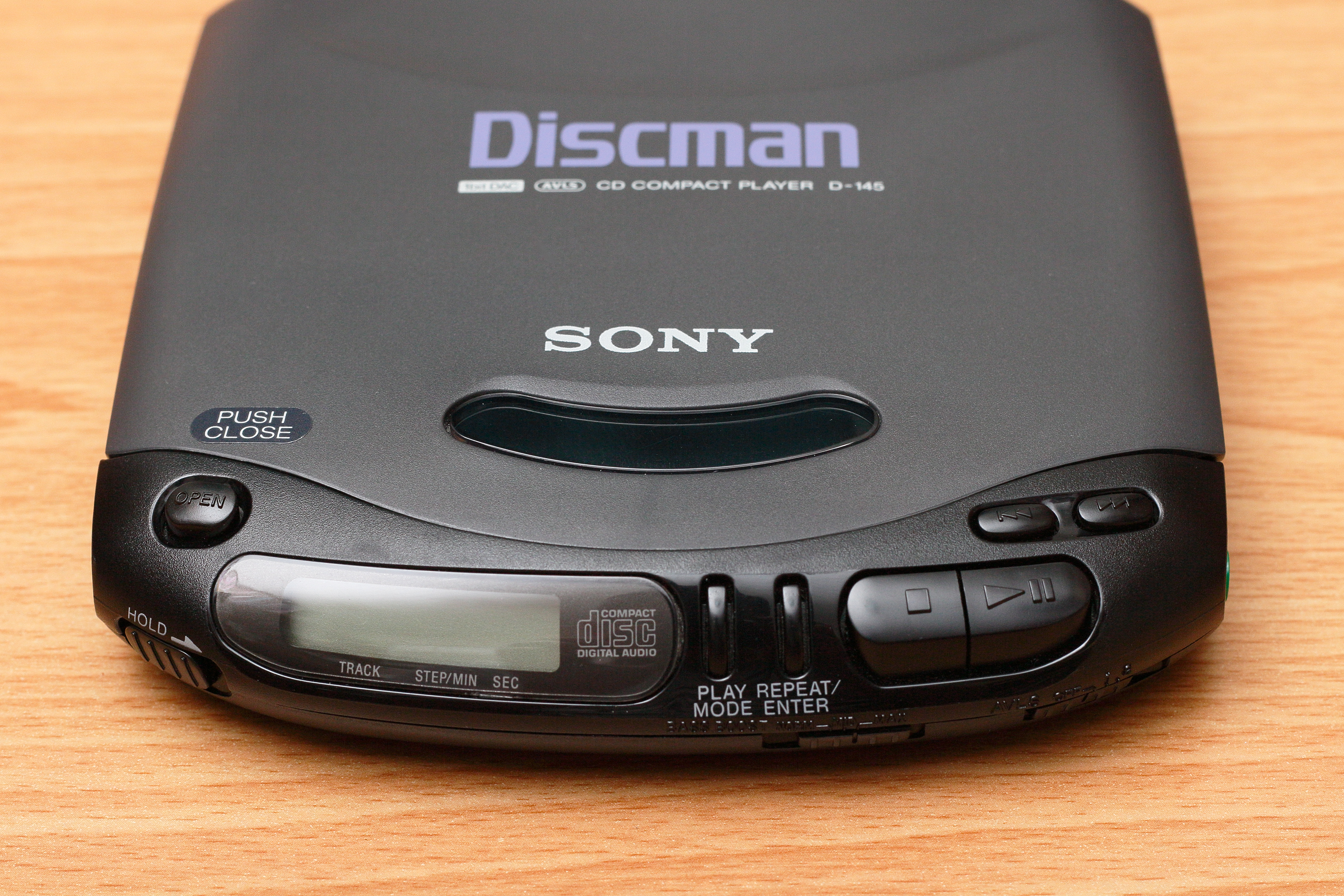
A Discman, which Acaster references in a routine about 1999

Acaster describes the best year of his life: 1999, when he was 14. He recounts a solar eclipse on a family holiday, but drifts into several tangents. He talks profanely to the "filthy top of the tea" to scare off Christians, imagines trying to save a life on a plane with his steady hand skills from controlling a Discman, and depicts two new roommates' periods syncing as they discover they are both watching The Sopranos.

In 2013, Acaster says, he is living with his girlfriend in a small flat. A year after their relationship ends, he discovers from a newspaper that she is in a relationship with Rowan Atkinson—known for the character Mr. Bean—whom she had performed with in a play. (Note: According to Stuff, the ex-girlfriend Acaster references is Louise Ford and the newspaper article he read was in The Sun.) Subsequently, Acaster sees Atkinson everywhere in his life. He instructs the audience not to tweet about the gig, as they cannot capture the nuance: the routine is designed at his expense, not the couple's. However, he permits himself one joke about Atkinson having a chicken on his head, justified by Atkinson saying it is unnecessary to apologise for funny jokes in the context of a comment Boris Johnson made.

In 2017, the worst year of Acaster's life, his agent of eight years terminated their relationship. Acaster says he only has time to tell one point of view: his agent's. According to his agent, Acaster ruins everything as a prank. On Sunday Brunch, he announces the commissioning of his Netflix specials Repertoire without permission, potentially putting the deal in jeopardy. As James' therapist told him that he blames himself in every situation—such as his recent breakup—he uses this in his prank to ask his agent to stop placing full blame on him. While swearing at his agent on the phone, he references his poor mental health and suicidal ideation. His agent ends their relationship in a later call.

The same year, Acaster explains, he began therapy and identified rejection as a personal issue; he would let relationships sour until the other person ended them. This expresses itself ironically when his therapist fails to turn up one week and when she introduces her son to Acaster's material. Acaster decides to write a text terminating their sessions, thus paradoxically showing she has been effective in helping him end unproductive relationships. His therapist pushes to say goodbye in person and introduce Acaster to her children. Acaster sends a text explaining how her actions exploited the issues they had discussed.

Catastrophising about his therapist leaking personal information, Acaster tells the audience the most embarrassing thing she knows. The audience unexpectedly applaud his comment that talking about poor mental health should not be embarrassing, momentarily throwing him off. Returning to the story, he recalls involuntarily defecating at a restaurant with his agent due to food poisoning. However, he has a full change of clothes and makeup wipes on him. Instead of the steak dinner he wanted, he is just left with "shit".

In a post-credits scene, Acaster says that his life has subsequently improved from 2017 to 2018 to 2019; he has a new therapist, a new agent and is in a new relationship.

== Performances ==
=== Touring ===
Acaster began performing under the title Cold Lasagne Hate Myself 1999 in October 2018, continuing throughout 2019 across the UK and at the West End location Vaudeville Theatre. Unlike previous shows, he did not perform it at the Edinburgh Festival Fringe. He preferred performing in larger venues, saying they made him feel less exposed when sharing his personal life.

After touring the show, Acaster told interviewers that he did not want to commit to continuing stand-up comedy, with comments like: "Right now I don't want to do it again ever". Lockdown in the COVID-19 pandemic gave him the opportunity to reflect. By 2022, he had resumed performing in the UK and announced a tour in the US, Hecklers Welcome.

=== Filming and release ===
The show was recorded on 17 December 2019 in Hackney, London, at the EartH Theatre. It was released online for one night only on DICE in December 2020. The special was subsequently released on Vimeo, alongside Make a New Tomorrow, on 5 March 2021. In 2023, it aired on Sky Comedy. Acaster said that he was "very aware" that extracts posted out of context would become many people's only experience of the material. He said his wording was as precise as possible to avoid audience misinterpretation.

== Themes ==
=== Transgender segment ===
In one clip from the show, Acaster is critical of transphobic comedy and mentions Ricky Gervais by name. This clip went viral in January 2021. It had renewed popularity with the release of Dave Chappelle's The Closer (2021) and Gervais' special SuperNature (2022), which joke about transgender people. Acaster told Metro that the justification of "challenging people" was a "completely nonsensical" reason for "punching down" and that it is a person's responsibility to argue against behaviour that is "not appropriate or acceptable" in their place of work. When asked by a journalist for The Independent, he said it was good that the full segment is shared in context, that he does not view criticism of him over the clip, and that he does not mind if people who disagree with his message are angry or hate him. However, he commented that trans comedians and writers can be more articulate than his routine.

=== Mental health commentary ===
Mental health is a theme in Acaster's stories, including his experience in therapy and a call to the Samaritans. He describes how a relationship ending and issues with his agent led to suicidal thoughts. During the routine, Acaster clarifies that he has processed feelings related to the events he is recalling. He said this was in order to avoid romanticising poor mental health, encourage people to work on their issues and know that it can improve, and to guard against "patronising" audience reactions of pity. When describing his call to the Samaritans, he uses phrasing along the lines of "Those of you who have done this, you know that this ..." to avoid alienating vulnerable audience members.

Acaster was surprised by the heckles and audience pushback to dialogue about his mental health: he did not think it would "be that big of a deal to talk about it", assuming that the lack of open conversation about mental health was due to people not wanting to talk about their issues, rather than people not wanting to listen. Examples include hecklers calling him an attention-seeker or crybaby and expressing anger when Acaster discussed suicidal ideation. According to some online comments from audience members, much of Acaster's performances saw him engage with hecklers for large parts of the show. He expressed sympathy for Meghan, Duchess of Sussex, who expressed suicidality, saying that anybody receiving the amount of "pressure and hate" that she did would end up feeling like that.

In a work-in-progress gig, a man began crying at the routine about Acaster's agent and Acaster hugged him onstage. This motivated Acaster to find a way to target the humour at society or the situation, rather than at his expense.

== Make a New Tomorrow ==
Released alongside Cold Lasagne Hate Myself 1999 on Vimeo, Make a New Tomorrow was filmed across two performances at the EartH Theatre on 12 March 2019, with a warm-up the night before. The 40-minute special consists of material that did not fit with the theme of Cold Lasagne Hate Myself 1999.

Make a New Tomorrow begins with Acaster, mid-speech, commenting on squash drinks. He criticises an audience member who says ten is the age a child begins to make squash for themselves. Seven is the age Acaster suggests. He recalls his mother's diluted squash and drinking stronger squash at a friend's house. Acaster insults adults who drink squash and interrogates the idea of double strength squash.

Continuing his memory of a 1999 eclipse, Acaster says he does not feel connected to others like he did in that moment. Trying to explain the emotions of that moment, he pictures mocking his mother at home for crying at a film.

In 1999, says Acaster, Manchester United F.C. won the Treble. He observes that his audience do not enjoy football. Acaster has supported Manchester United since age seven, but says that its mascot—the devil Fred the Red—was a bold choice. When watching the team win the Treble in a pub, Acaster saw some strange celebrations. He thought the player Teddy Sheringham was old at the time, but he is that age now.

The year ended with humanity defeating the 'Millennium Bug', which Acaster says was a beetle trying to break computers. He laments that the beetle was right and complains about the internet. He does not oppose phones, however, picturing two friends finding each other in an airport through a phone call. Additionally, he thinks YouTube is useful, as he can watch people eat spicy chicken wings when he wakes up during the night and remembers his mortality. Back in 1999, he says, he had to wake his mother up and make her eat chicken wings.

Acaster segues into to-do lists, saying that a person's identity is based in what they want to do, not what they actually do. Continuing the theme of mortality, he contrasts the mysterious-sounding 'John Doe' with the arrogant 'Joe Bloggs', and explains why anonymous corpses are called the former.

The show ends with Acaster explaining the origin of the title. In 1999, he remembers, there was a Gang Show of Scouts and Guides at the Royal Albert Hall. As a child, he performed a new song written for the show: "Make a New Tomorrow". He reflects on the composer Malcolm, the whiteness of the group, and Brexit. The special closes with footage of the Gang Show, which is also used as the opening titles and intermission card.

== Reception ==
Acaster won the Melbourne International Comedy Festival Award in 2019 for his performance of the routine, marking the first time a British comedian had won the award since 2010. He also won Best Show at the 2019 Chortle Awards. The routine was nominated at the 2019 Critics' Choice Award for Best Comedy Special, and Acaster was nominated at the 2019 Helpmann Awards for Best Comedy Performer. The special received five stars out of five in The Guardian, Evening Standard, i, Chortle, and The Skinny.

The Guardian's Brian Logan praised the routine for its precise wording—"burnished to gem-like perfection"—the "complex games with irony and perspective", and "unexpected angles" for jokes where the writing and delivery "marry beautifully". Logan also reviewed that the special ventures into "personal intimacy" which Acaster had previously avoided in his stand-up. Bruce Dessau, writing in the Evening Standard, lauded Acaster's "brilliantly self-flagellating account" of a break-up, "ingenious absurdist routine" about a second referendum and the "winning precision" with which the performance is structured.

In i, Alice Jones praises Acaster's combination of stand-up structures like the break-up show and the mental health exposé "into something new and entirely thrilling". Jones found the humour surprising and "steelier, riskier and much funnier" than the comedian's previous use of whimsy. Steve Bennett of Chortle believed that it was "as finely engineered a show" as any Acaster had performed, containing "a masterclass of observational comedy, as meticulously written as ever", an "unpredictable mixture of irony, awe and modest outrage" and a "doozy" of an ending. Bennett praised Acaster's treatment of worn subjects such as Brexit, his use of "honesty to lend an extra push to brilliantly funny gags" and that narrative threads are "woven together" in his therapy content.

Reviewing for The Skinny, Johnny Owens said the show's message was one of "accepting that, in the end, you can only ever be whoever it is you happen to be". Owens praised Acaster's reinvented persona as helping "define the crux of the entire show", wrote that the comedy was "deftly-timed" and "neatly structured" and found the show "more ludicrously entertaining" than his existing body of work. Katie Mears of Vulture noted that Acaster speaks about his real life for the first time in this routine. Mears praised the special as a "true feat", lauding the "dynamic, earnest" performance, but said that it had become more "complex and expansive" than its framing device of why 1999 and 2017 were the best and worst years of Acaster's life, respectively.
