= Party Gator Purgatory =

Studio album by Temps
- Released: May 19, 2023
- Recorded: 2020–2022
- Genre: Experimental
- Length: 54:30
- Label: Bella Union

Singles from Party Gator Purgatory
- 1. "no,no" Released: 04 November 2022; 2. "bleedthemtoxins" Released: 31 January 2024; 3. "partygatorresurrection" Released: 09 March 2023; 4. "ificouldjust" Released: 04 April 2023

Party Gator Purgatory is the debut studio album by British experimental collective Temps, headed by the English comedian James Acaster. It was released on May 19, 2023, via Bella Union.

== Background ==
In November 2022, the comedian James Acaster announced a new musical project called Temps, a music collective of 40 musicians. Performing artists include Quelle Chris, Xenia Rubinos, Nnamdi Ogbonnaya (NNAMDÏ) and Shamir. Acaster, a drummer, had initially conceived the project as a mockumentary with Louis Theroux's production company, but during the COVID-19 pandemic he abandoned the idea and began to collaborate through email with musicians he had contacted while writing his book Perfect Sound Whatever (2019).

== Composition and recording ==
Party Gator Purgatory explores genres including alt-rock, electronica, hip-hop and jazz. Acaster described the project as neither comedic nor serious. He aimed to give as little direction to the musicians as possible, encouraging them to improvise. Some songs would change tone completely as different musicians added their parts. Acaster combined parts together, with a dozen additional people involved in audio engineering and distribution.

== Release ==
Party Gator Purgatory was released on Bella Union on May 19, 2023. It was released on CD, 2LP vinyl and on streaming services.

Music videos were shot by Turtle Canyon Comedy. Initially, they feature Acaster in the 'Party Gator' costume—a lifesized toy alligator that he won at a fair as a child. After Acaster suffered an injured ankle, heatstroke and labyrinthitis, the costume was replaced by a puppet.

Four singles were released: "no,no", "bleedthemtoxins", "partygatorresurrection" and "ificouldjust". With the release of the album came a music video for "partygatorRIP". Acaster created the album's artwork with highlighter pens.

== Reception ==
Professional ratings
Review scores
Source	Rating
Clash	9/10
DIY	3.5/5 stars
The Line of Best Fit	7/10
Far Out	2/5

For Far Out, Tyler Golsen rated Party Gator Purgatory two out of five stars, summarising it as "a random soup that never congeals" due to its lack of direction, large number of contributing artists and combination of genres. However, Golsen identified a minority of songs with an overarching direction and an ambition that was occasionally successful. It was The Quietus's Album of the Week, with Alistair Shuttleworth praising that it was "genuinely excellent" as well as unique. Shuttleworth reviewed it as a "technicolour, maximalist, hugely inventive album" with a "sprightly, playful character" overall, but a number of "unexpectedly moving" commentaries on mental health.

== Track listing ==
Party Gator Purgatory
No.	Title	Length
1.	"lookaliveandplaydead" (featuring Quelle Chris, Mal Devisa, Denmark Vessey, Foonyap)	4:22
2.	"kept" (featuring NNAMDÏ, Gaston Bandimic, Xenia Rubinos, Satomi Matsuzaki, Law Holt, Quelle Chris)	6:48
3.	"partygatorR.I.P." (featuring Xenia Rubinos, Denmark Vessey, Quelle Chris, bb tombo)	5:03
4.	"no.no" (featuring Quelle Chris, Xenia Rubinos, NNAMDÏ, Shamir)	5:55
5.	"at(moves)" (featuring Quelle Chris, Wheelchair Sports Camp, Mal Devisa)	7:01
6.	"partygatorpurgatory" (featuring Babar Luck, Law Holt, Gaston Bandimic, bb tombo)	4:00
7.	"ificouldjust" (featuring Yoni Wolf, Quelle Chris, Shamir, Montaigne, Ami Dang)	4:14
8.	"bleedthemtoxins" (featuring Joana Gomila, NNAMDÏ, Shamir, Quelle Chris)	5:11
9.	"partygatorresurrection" (featuring Open Mike Eagle, me oh myriorama, Montaigne, Low Growl, bb tombo)	5:18
10.	"slowreturn" (featuring Yoni Wolf, Shamir, Elizabete Balčus)	6:33
Total length:		54:30

After Party EP
No.	Title	Length
1.	"fitinthiscostume" (featuring Ami Dang, Emma Daman, Blanck Mass, me oh myriorama, Gaston Bandimic, Law Holt, Public Speaking, The Growth Eternal)	4:54
2.	"firstbirthday" (featuring NNAMDÏ, Public Speaking)	1:19
3.	"partygatorpoltergeist" (featuring me oh myriorama, J Thoubbs, The Growth Eternal)	5:38
4.	"lastbirthday" (featuring Gaston Bandimic, Blanck Mass)	1:39
5.	"belongbetween" (featuring Quelle Chris, Wheelchair Sports Camp, Law Holt, Babar Luck, Mal Devisa, Public Speaking)	8:27
Total length:		22:00

Vinyl releases have tracks 1–3 on side A, 4–6 on side B, 7–10 on side C, and After Party EP on side D. CD versions have the After Party EP as unlisted tracks 11–15.

== Personnel ==
- James Acaster – production, mixing, drums
- Chris Hamilton – mixing, engineering
- Joe Hutchinson – mastering
- Al Clayton – engineering
- Dan Hendrix – engineering
