= Demfati =

Nigerian event technology company

- Demfati logo from 2024
- Type: Private
- Industry: Event technology, e-commerce, software
- Founded: 2020; 6 years ago in Calabar, Nigeria
- Founders: Emmanuel Ekunke; Clement Donatus; Gracious Ekunke
- Area served: Worldwide
- Key people: Emmanuel Ekunke (CEO); Gracious Ekunke (COO)
- Products: Ticketing technology Ticket sales Marketing Distribution of event tickets and information Voting technology WhatsApp chatbot for tickets, voting and support
- Number of employees: 10+
- Website: demfati.com

Demfati is a software-as-a-service (SaaS) platform for ticketing, online voting and attendance management at public and private events. Demfati also allows event organizers to promote and market their events on websites like Facebook, X, and Instagram. Founded as Ocoms in Calabar, Nigeria, the company rebranded to Demfati in late 2020. Its core services include event ticketing, custom event pages, online forms, voting modules and a digital wallet feature. Demfati's revenue is derived from a fee placed upon transactions made through its software at 8% per transaction.

== Features ==
Demfati offers platforms to hold private as well as public events online.

According to the platform guidebook, event listing is reserved for users who first list a business on the website. This is intended to validate organizers and restrict impersonation or abuse.

The site features a digital purse for users to use in paying for tickets or votes and, in certain instances, earn cashback per event. Unlike most of its competitors, it does not yet offer reserved seating and ticket transfer.

== Reception ==
- In 2023, Emmanuel Ekunke was nominated in the top Nigerian UNDER 30 category of The Founder of The Year Awards (FOYA) held in Kenya.
- In July 2025, Techpoint Africa reported that Demfati's subdomain branding and WhatsApp ticket-sale integration reduced marketing barriers for small planners.
- The Pathway News noted the platform's growth trajectory in Nigeria and highlighted its role in digitizing ticket sales for community events.

== See also ==
- Mobile ticketing
- WhatsApp
- Chatbot
