= James Acaster's Classic Scrapes =

2017 autobiography

- Front cover
- Author: James Acaster
- Audio read by: James Acaster
- Language: English
- Subject: Autobiography
- Publisher: Headline Publishing Group
- Publication date: 24 August 2017
- Publication place: United Kingdom
- Media type: Print; Audiobook
- Pages: 302
- ISBN: 9781472247209

James Acaster's Classic Scrapes is a 2017 autobiography by English comedian James Acaster. Consisting largely of stories told from a XFM radio show presented by Josh Widdicombe, the book describes amusing incidents in which Acaster ended up in embarrassing situations, referred to as "scrapes". The scrapes are often one-off stories, but many are on the subjects of childhood embarrassment, Acaster's experiences performing as a drummer, and his early ventures into stand-up comedy. The book was a bestseller in The Sunday Times and received positive reviews. Acaster's second book, Perfect Sound Whatever, followed in August 2019.

== Background ==
James Acaster is an English comedian from Kettering, known for appearances on panel shows such as Mock the Week. In 2012, his friend Josh Widdicombe got a weekly radio show on XFM. Acaster quickly became a regular guest on the show, where he would discuss his "scrapes"—funny incidents from his past or from the previous week in which he had made bad decisions and ended up in ridiculous scenarios. He became known as "the Scrapemaster". Following the show, Acaster wrote up these stories into his first book, James Acaster's Classic Scrapes. The book was announced in December 2016 and published by Headline Publishing Group in 24 August 2017. An audiobook narrated by Acaster was published on Audible on the same date. In autumn 2017, Acaster went on a book tour for promotion, which consisted of 21 events.

== Synopsis ==
Acaster recalls scrapes in roughly chronological order, beginning with anecdotes from his childhood such as wiping his wet hands on a classmate's coat or pretending he knows juggling for a Cub Scout performance. He tells stories set in his secondary school years, in which an assembly performance fell flat and a "Humpty Dumpty" routine became very popular. Acaster plays the drums, and he joined the school band on a trip to Holland. He relates stories from working in a pub kitchen. In the meantime, he formed various bands such as Pindrop, in which their lead singer would scream rather than sing onstage, and The Wow! Scenario, which led to Acaster and friends collecting large yellow "W"s. Acaster had a singing teacher for two years and they remained in contact afterwards; having a key to her house, he once let himself in to go to the toilet when he was desperate, without her knowledge. Other musical scrapes involve other bands of his, a jam night and a performance at the Greenbelt Festival. Acaster also tells stories involving his friends, such as a time he stole a road sign.

Aged 18, Acaster says he had a "midlife crisis", which led him to coming up with bucket lists and setting himself challenges. Examples vary from skydiving for charity to singing karaoke. The book contains three stories of separate car crashes; in the first, Acaster lost control of the car shortly after passing his test. In the second, he fell asleep at the wheel after his final performance with a band. The third was whilst he was driving on tour as a comedian. There are several chapters discussing one-off stories such as one night where Acaster got very drunk and unusually aggressive while alone on a bus. Some scrapes involve Acaster on holiday, such as a trip to Alcatraz Island.

Acaster began performing stand-up whilst working with autistic children at a school. Following a stand-up performance in Basingstoke, Acaster slept in a bush. After nine months of stand-up, Acaster was invited to be a support act for comedian Josie Long on tour, and quit his school job. Following this, he supported comedian Milton Jones. The book ends with a chapter called "Cabadged", about a series of cabbage-related pranks with a friend's nine-year-old son, Mick. Acaster had gone to stay at the friend's house after a performance and Mick left cabbage leaves between his bedsheets before he arrived. Mick continued "cabadging" Acaster until he retaliated by placing fifty cabbages around Mick's room, and the pair agreed on a truce.

== Reception ==
The book was a bestseller in The Sunday Times and chosen by the newspaper as a 2017 Humour Book of the Year. The List included the book in an article titled "Best books by comedians in 2017". The book was nominated for a 2018 Chortle Award in the Book category. Matt Rudd of The Sunday Times describes the book as "a charming and nostalgic memoir", noting that it is unusual for being a comedian autobiography with a non-depressing tone. Steve Bennett of Chortle praises that the book's humour about embarrassment is made relatable and "universally hilarious" through its "painfully funny" writing style.

Matt Forrest of The Reviews Hub reviews a book tour performance in which Acaster read highlights from his book and conducted Q&A sessions. Rating it five stars out of five, Forrest commends Acaster as a "fantastic, engaging storyteller" and praises his "surreal, and absurd sense of humour". However, Forrest notes that hecklers and audience distractions left a "bitter taste", despite Acaster's "quick-witted and versatile" attempts to handle these situations.

== Sequels ==
Perfect Sound Whatever is a follow-up book to Classic Scrapes, about an obsessive challenge that Acaster undertook in 2017 to collect as much music from 2016 as possible. It was published by Headline Publishing Group in August 2019.
