= Stylophone =

Stylus-operated analog synthesizer

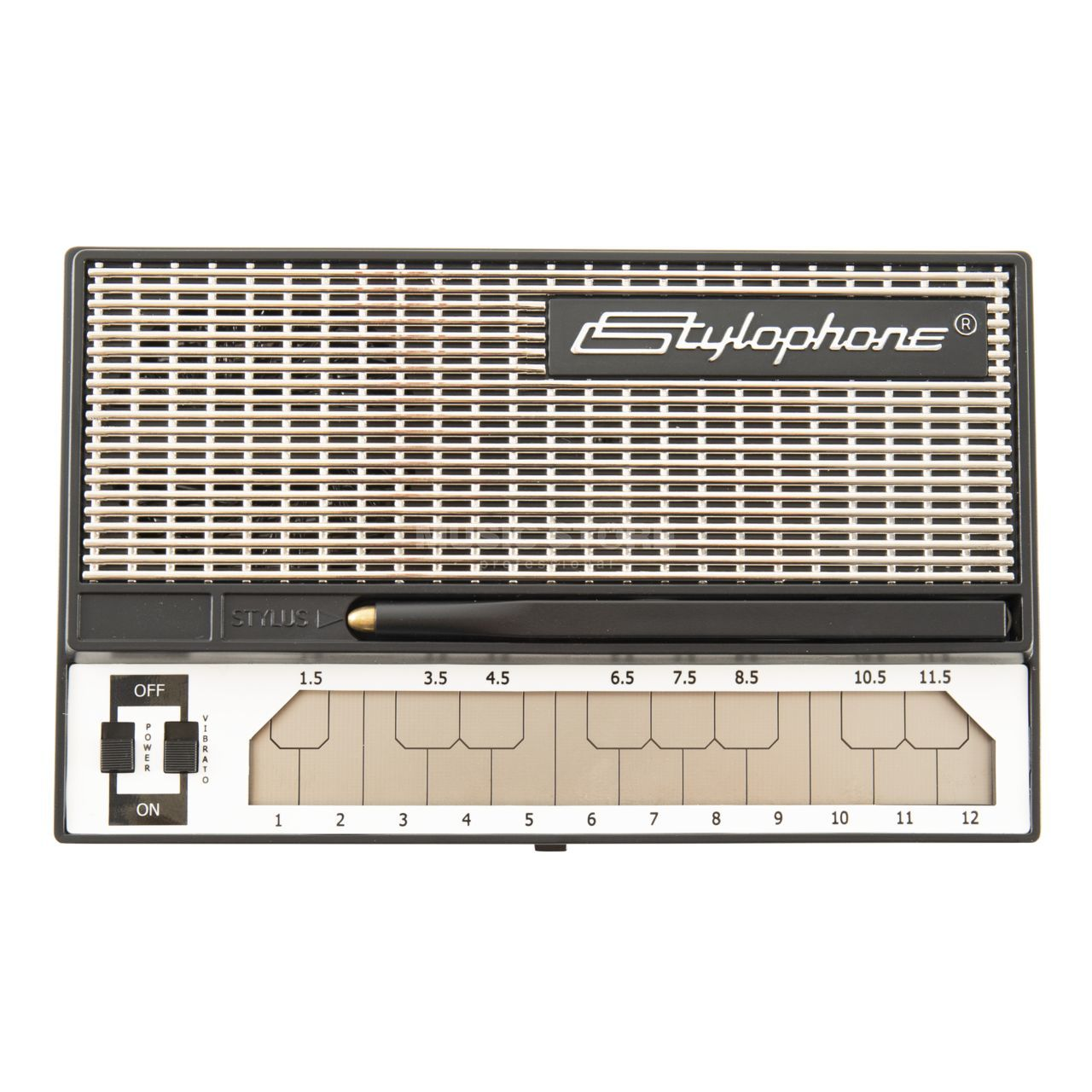
- A Stylophone from the 1970s
- Type: Musical instrument, toy
- Inventor: Brian Jarvis
- Inception: 1967
- Manufacturer: Dubreq
- Available: Yes
- Models: Original (Standard), Original (Treble), Original (Bass), 350S, Pianomate, Mini-Amp, S1, Keyring, Beatbox, S2, Gen X-1, GEN R-8, Analog Sound S1, Beat, Bowie Limited Edition, Theremin, Stylosette, CPM DS-2, Gen X-2, CPM DF-8, Pink Special Edition, VOICE, OTF
- Website: https://stylophone.com/

The Stylophone is a miniature analog synthesizer played with a stylus. Invented in 1967 by Brian Jarvis, it entered production in 1968 and was manufactured by Dubreq in London. Around three million units were sold during its original production run. Although primarily marketed as a toy, it was also used by musicians such as John Lennon, Kraftwerk and David Bowie. The Stylophone was relaunched in 2007 by the toy company Re: in partnership with Dubreq, and several new models have since been released.

== Original models ==
The Stylophone consists of a metal keyboard made from a printed circuit board and is played by touching it with a stylus. Each note on the keyboard is connected to a voltage-controlled oscillator through a different-value resistor, and touching the stylus to the keyboard closes the circuit. The instrument also features a power switch and vibrato control on the front panel beside the keyboard, along with a tuning potentiometer on the rear.

The Stylophone was available in standard, bass and treble variants, with cabinet colours used to distinguish them. The standard model was black-and-white, the treble model was white and tuned an octave higher, and the bass model was beige-and-white and tuned an octave lower. The standard version was the most common.

There was also a larger version called the 350S, released in 1971. It featured more notes on the keyboard, various voices, a wah-wah effect controlled by moving a hand over a photosensor, and two styluses.

In the early 1970s, Dubreq introduced the Stylophone Pianomate, a piano attachment synthesizer released in 1972. It used plunger switches placed behind the keys of an acoustic piano, allowing electronic voices to be added alongside the piano's natural sound. The Pianomate offered three timbres and vibrato, which were controlled through a separate amplifier and pedal.

Dubreq also manufactured accessories such as the Stylophone Mini-Amp, a small amplifier released in 1973 for use with Stylophones and other portable instruments. It featured controls for tremolo and tone, as well as dual inputs that provided additional sound-shaping options.

In the mid-1970s, a revised model was introduced featuring simulated wood panelling on the speaker grille and a volume control. Production of the Stylophone ceased in 1975.

Entertainer Rolf Harris served as the Stylophone's advertising spokesman in the United Kingdom for several years and appeared on many "play-along" records sold by the manufacturer.

== 2007 revival ==
In October 2007, 28 years after production had ceased, the Stylophone was relaunched by the toy company Re:creation in partnership with Dubreq Ltd. (re‑formed in 2003 by Ben Jarvis, son of the original inventor). The revival model, officially known as the S1 and manufactured in China, was a digital recreation of the original instrument. While closely resembling the 1960s Stylophone, it added a volume control, audio throughput, and two additional sounds.

The Bass, Treble, 350S, Pianomate, and Mini-Amp models were not included in the relaunch, having been discontinued decades earlier as part of Dubreq's original product line.

=== Stylophone Keyring ===
Released in 2007 during Dubreq's relaunch of the Stylophone brand, the Stylophone Keyring is a miniature synthesizer designed as a collectible accessory. It features a small keyboard that can be played with a stylus and includes a chain attachment for use as a keyring.

Smaller and simpler than standard Stylophone models, the Keyring retains the instrument's distinctive appearance and electronic sound. It has been promoted as a fan-oriented product and featured during events such as International Synthesizer Day.

=== Stylophone Beatbox ===
In September 2009, Dubreq released the Stylophone Beatbox, the first Stylophone model designed primarily for percussion. Unlike earlier Stylophones, it features a circular case with a 13‑pad touch‑sensitive keypad instead of the traditional keyboard layout. The Beatbox includes three sound banks (drum, vocal beatbox, and bass), a tempo control, and a basic record-and-loop function for creating and replaying short sequences.

=== Stylophone S2 ===
In December 2012, Dubreq released the Series 2 Stylophone (S2), a limited-edition analogue synthesizer manufactured in the United Kingdom.

=== Stylophone Gen X-1 ===
In January 2017, Dubreq released details of the Stylophone Gen X-1 portable analogue synthesizer. The instrument was designed and manufactured by Dubreq. The Gen X-1 includes controls for LFO, analogue delay, a low-pass filter, and envelope settings. It also features sub-octave switches and an input that allows it to be used as an effects unit.

=== Stylophone GEN R-8 ===
In October 2019, Dubreq released the Stylophone GEN R-8, a limited-edition analogue Stylophone housed in a metal case. The instrument includes features found on more advanced analogue synthesizers, including dual VCOs, a multimode filter, an analogue delay, and a range of modulation options. Larger than standard Stylophone models, it was produced in an initial limited run of 500 units.

=== Stylophone Analog Sound S1 ===
In July 2020, Dubreq released the Stylophone Analog Sound S1 as a replacement for the 2007 S1. The new model is visually similar to its predecessor but features less rounded corners and omits the auxiliary input. Internally, the digital sampled sounds were replaced with an analogue oscillator based on a 555 timer IC, while the tone selector offers three octave ranges. According to Dubreq, its sound is closer to that of the original 1970s Stylophones.

=== Stylophone Bowie Limited Edition ===
In September 2021, Dubreq launched a limited-edition version of the Analog S1 as a tribute to David Bowie. The model features an all-white finish, an official Bowie logo moulded into the chromed grille, and a colour-printed booklet containing photographs, interviews, and tablature for a selection of Bowie's songs, including Space Oddity.

=== Stylophone Beat ===
In October 2023, Dubreq released the Stylophone Beat, the successor to the Stylophone Beatbox. Like its predecessor, it features a record button, a play button, and a circular metal pad. Unlike the Beatbox, however, it has a more box-shaped design, four sound banks (rock, techno, hip hop, and beatbox), and stay-in-time click track and tempo-lock features. It can also record multiple layers of beats and allows individual sounds to be muted during playback.

=== Stylophone Theremin ===
On 8 January 2024, Dubreq released a Stylophone-themed (pitch-only) theremin. Unlike most Stylophone models, which are played with a stylus, the instrument uses a slider to select notes. It also features a three-position switch that allows the sound to be generated from the slider, the antenna, or a combination of both.

=== Stylosette ===
In December 2024, Dubreq released the Stylosette, a cassette-shaped miniature synthesizer with a 13-key touch-sensitive keyboard instead of the traditional stylus. The instrument is monophonic, features built-in vibrato and delay effects, and is powered by two AA batteries.

=== Stylophone CPM DS-2 ===
In January 2025, Dubreq released the Stylophone CPM DS-2, a compact portable analogue drone synthesizer. Its features include dual oscillators, sub-oscillators, analogue filters, reverb, and Eurorack compatibility.

=== Stylophone Gen X-2 ===
In August 2025, Dubreq introduced the Stylophone Gen X-2 as the successor to the Gen X-1. The instrument retains the portable analogue design and stylus keyboard of its predecessor while adding a multifunction tactile expression strip for real-time control. It also expands connectivity with seven CV/Gate input and output jacks for integration with external keyboards, sequencers, DAWs, and modular synthesizer

Features include a sub-oscillator with octave selection, pulse-width modulation, and an envelope with attack, pitch, and decay controls. The Gen X-2 also retains the Gen X-1's low-pass filter, LFO, and analogue delay. At launch, it was priced at approximately £69.95 / $99.

=== Stylophone CPM DF-8 ===
In November 2025, Dubreq introduced the Stylophone CPM DF-8, a stereo analogue multi-filter unit with modulation and delay. Features include dual filter channels, multiple filter types, ADSR envelopes, and Eurorack compatibility.

=== Stylophone Pink Special Edition ===
Also in November 2025, Dubreq released a special edition of the original Stylophone finished in bright pink. The Stylophone Pink retains the classic stylus interface, built-in speaker, headphone socket, and vibrato effect, but differs from the standard model in its appearance.

=== Stylophone VOICE ===
In January 2026, Dubreq introduced the Stylophone VOICE, a portable multi-sampler. Unlike previous Stylophone models, it allows users to record samples using a built-in microphone or auxiliary input and play them back with a stylus-operated keyboard. Features include three sample playback voices, twelve onboard effects (including pitch shift, delay, and reverb), and a built-in sequencer with four pattern memory slots. The VOICE also includes integrated drum sounds, a two-octave stylus keyboard with a transpose function, and a built-in speaker.

=== Stylophone OTF ===
Announced in January 2026, the Stylophone On-The-Fly (OTF) is a performance sequencer developed by Dubreq as part of its Stylophone Pro Range. Unlike traditional step sequencers, it is intended for live use. The OTF features 8-step pattern programming with access to 16-, 32-, or 64-step sequences and supports glide, ratchets, rests, ties, and controlled randomness on a per-step basis.

The instrument includes Eurorack CV, Gate, Sync, and MIDI connectivity, and can be linked with multiple units. Additional features include loop recording of up to 1024 steps, per-step gate outputs, summed gate output, and selectable pitch modes such as whole-tone, blues, and Spanish scales. Stylophone launched a waitlist for updates, demonstrations, and release information through its official website.

=== Stylophone Mini ===
In October 2026, Dubreq introduced the Stylophone Mini, a miniature keyring-sized version of the Stylophone featuring a built-in speaker, LED indicator light, and vibrato effect switch. It comes in Original (black), Pink, and White colour variants, with the White version drawing inspiration from the David Bowie Limited Edition Stylophone.

== Reception, legacy, and popular culture ==
The Stylophone has been described as both a novelty toy and a cult synthesizer. Its distinctive tone and portability contributed to its popularity, while its use by artists such as David Bowie and Kraftwerk helped establish its place in popular music. More recent reviews have highlighted models such as the Gen X‑1 and GEN R‑8 for expanding the instrument's capabilities beyond its traditional role as a toy.

- One of the earliest uses of the Stylophone in pop music was in the Small Faces song "Donkey Rides, A Penny, A Glass", which was released as the B-side of their single "The Universal" in June 1968.
- John Lennon played a Stylophone during a rehearsal of the George Harrison song "Old Brown Shoe" on 28 January 1969.
- David Bowie is credited with playing the Stylophone on his 1969 debut hit song "Space Oddity" and also for his 2002 album Heathen track titled "Slip Away," as well as on the song "Heathen (The Rays)".
- Rahsaan Roland Kirk played the Stylophone onstage in a 1 minute intro to “I Say a Little Prayer for You” during a 1969 concert.
- Kraftwerk's 1981 song "Pocket Calculator" features the Stylophone among the song's main instruments and ends with a Stylophone solo.
- The Tall Dwarfs' song "All My Hollowness to You" from the 1981 EP Three Songs uses the Stylophone as the main instrument.
- The 1999 track "Style" (and its several other versions) by Orbital takes its name from the Stylophone, which is used extensively on the track.
- Richard Barone uses the Stylophone on numerous recordings, including "Glow" and '"Girl" from his 2010 album Glow. In the latter song, it is played by his producer Tony Visconti.
- The Stylophone is used as a main instrument by Russian rock group Gromyka.
- British band Pulp use the Stylophone prominently in their song "Styloroc (Nites of Suburbia)", which appears on their 1992 Babies single and 1993 compilation album Intro – The Gift Recordings.
- The 2017 film Baby Driver features the Stylophone briefly in one scene.
- Min-Gi Park (voiced by Johnny Young) from the animated show, Infinity Train, was shown to own a stylophone.
- James Acaster performs "Auld Lang Syne" on a Stylophone in his Netflix special Repertoire.

== See also ==
- Omnichord
- Toy piano
- Electronic organ
- Synthesizer
- Otamatone
- Casio VL-1
