= James Acaster =

English comedian (born 1985)

- Acaster in 2026
- Born: James William Acaster; 9 January 1985 (age 41); Kettering, Northamptonshire, England
- Education: Northampton College (BTEC)
- Occupations: Stand-up comedian; presenter; podcaster; actor; musician
- Years active: 2008–present
- Notable work: Repertoire; Cold Lasagne Hate Myself 1999; Classic Scrapes; Perfect Sound Whatever
- Television: Hypothetical
- Awards: Five Chortle Awards; International Comedy Festival Awards at Melbourne and New Zealand; Just for Laughs Award
- Website: jamesacaster.com

James William Acaster (/ˈeɪkæstər/; born 9 January 1985) is an English comedian, presenter, podcaster, actor and musician. As well as the stand-up specials Repertoire and Cold Lasagne Hate Myself 1999, he is known for co-hosting the food podcast Off Menu and the panel show Hypothetical. Acaster makes use of fictional characters within his stand-up comedy, which is characterised by frequent callback jokes, offbeat observational comedy and overarching stories. He has won five Chortle Awards, a Just for Laughs Award and International Comedy Festival Awards at Melbourne and New Zealand.

After playing the drums for local bands in Kettering, Acaster began pursuing stand-up comedy as a career in 2008. Acaster drew acclaim for his shows at the Edinburgh Festival Fringe, where he was nominated for Best Comedy Show a record-breaking five times. In 2017, he toured three of his Fringe performances as The Trelogy while writing a fourth to accompany the set; this led to the four-part Netflix special Repertoire (2018). His following tour Cold Lasagne Hate Myself 1999 (2019) won a Melbourne International Comedy Festival Award. He began touring Hecklers Welcome in 2022, and it was released as a special on HBO Max in 2024.

Acaster appeared as a contestant on British television panel show Taskmaster (2018) and co-hosted Hypothetical (2019–2022) with Josh Widdicombe. In 2026, Acaster appeared on series two of The Celebrity Traitors.

Acaster's first book, Classic Scrapes (2017), was developed from a recurring segment on Widdicombe's XFM radio show in which he shared anecdotes of personal mishaps. His second book, Perfect Sound Whatever (2019), is about his mental health issues in 2017 that led to him collecting a large number of albums released in 2016. His third book, Guide to Quitting Social Media (2022), is a parody of the self-help genre. All three books have been Sunday Times bestsellers.

The music collective Temps was formed by Acaster and released its debut album, Party Gator Purgatory, in May 2023.

== Early life ==
James William Acaster was born in Kettering, Northamptonshire, on 9 January 1985. His father was a science teacher. His family attended a nondenominational Christian church whose Sunday sermons included humorous anecdotes, sketches recreating Bible stories, and rock music. At a young age, Acaster performed a sketch with his father and enjoyed the laughs it received. He attended Montagu Secondary School—since built over into Kettering Buccleuch Academy. At high school, he participated in the drama club, turning each performance into comedy. He dropped out of sixth form before sitting his A-level exams and sat a BTEC in Music Practice at Northampton College.

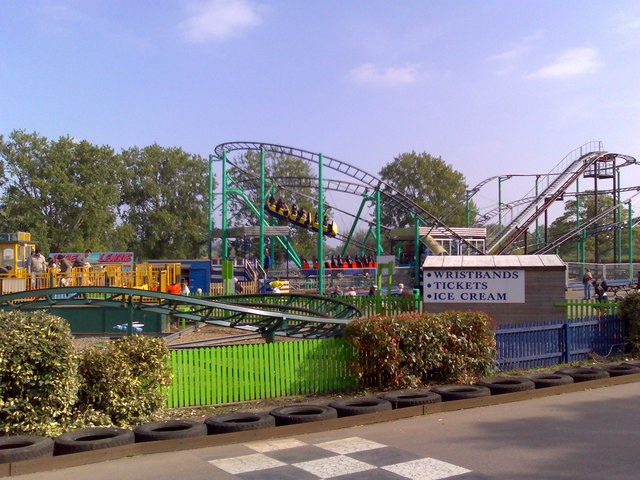
Wicksteed Park in Kettering, England, where Acaster briefly worked

Between the ages of 17 and 22, Acaster played the drums in various bands around his hometown, including The Wow! Scenario, Three Line Whip and Pindrop. While a drummer, Acaster had a number of jobs, including working in Wicksteed Park. He was a dishwasher in two kitchens but did not learn to cook in either role; the first kitchen had a culture of bullying but he was also able to make friends.

A car crash at the age of 18 led him to fixate on the idea of death, so Acaster created a bucket list: items included skydiving and stand-up comedy. He would complete them while working 12 hours per week in a kitchen. After completing a stand-up course at the Kettering Volunteer Bureau, he began performing every few months, but maintained the vision of becoming a professional musician.

== Stand-up comedy ==
=== 2008–11: Early career ===
After Acaster suffered another band splitting up, he decided to take a break from music, believing it to be an industry where hard work did not guarantee success. Without strong qualifications or a full-time job, Acaster pursued stand-up as a career. He started performing on open mics in 2008. He moved to Wood Green, North London, and supported himself financially by working as a teaching assistant in a South London secondary school for autistic students for nine months.

For the 2009 Edinburgh Festival Fringe, Acaster performed with Nick Helm and Josh Widdicombe in a free fringe show, garnering poor attendance and a single review—ThreeWeeks rated it one star and called it "depressing". For Josie Long's 2010 tour, the support acts were Acaster and The Pictish Trail. Most of the Welsh leg of the tour was cancelled following a car accident with Acaster at the wheel, which served as the inspiration for The Pictish Trail's single "Dead Connection" (2016). In 2011, Acaster toured as Milton Jones' support act.

=== 2011–2013: Edinburgh Fringe Festival ===
Acaster garnered acclaim through annual Edinburgh Festival Fringe shows, receiving five consecutive nominations for the Edinburgh Comedy Award for Best Comedy Show from 2012 to 2016, a record. In his early stand-up, he invited the audience onstage to participate and asked them to provide suggestions for him to incorporate into the show.

In 2011, he performed his first solo show, Amongst Other Things, at the Pleasance Courtyard. It included material on cheese graters, shopping trolleys, watching The West Wing, a surprise party and skydiving. It received four stars out of five from the British Comedy Guide; Matt Wood praised the "more abstract and ambitious routines" but was more critical of the structure, audience participation and slice of life material. Beth Kahn, in Broadway Baby, gave it three stars, praising the responses to hecklers and physical comedy but critiquing his listless manner and mundane topics. Brian Logan made similar observations in a two-star review for The Guardian.

Acaster's 2012 Edinburgh show was called Prompt. Subjects included comparisons of bread, a Kettering Town F.C. chant, outwitting telemarketers and cows' weather predictions. In a four star review, Chortle's Steve Bennett wrote that Acaster combined observational comedy with eccentricity in a well-structured performance. Giving it three stars, Veronica Lee of The Arts Desk praised the show as well-structured and whimsical, with frequent use of callback, but said that some tropes "feel simply mechanical".

Acaster wrote about one routine for The Guardian: a real-life story about a man cheating on his partner and saying, "you wouldn't bring an apple to an orchard, would you?" He wanted to oppose the glorification of affairs in stand-up comedy. He focused first on the phrase, as his style was to "get caught up in the little details", and then incorporated outrage, despite most of his material being understated. The Independent's Julian Hall found that the routine had a style similar to Stewart Lee or Richard Herring, but was one of the "least promising" in the set.

Acaster performing for an audience of children in 2013

Acaster returned to Edinburgh in 2013 with the show Lawnmower. He wore Marks & Spencer clothing resembling a school uniform. With fictionalised biographic material, he commented on Yoko Ono's impact on The Beatles, Percy Pig sweets, mariachi music and the placeholder names Joe Bloggs and John Doe. A four-star Time Out review praised the careful structuring, wording and delivery. Mark Monahan, reviewing for The Daily Telegraph, also gave four stars for a "new vitality and unpredictability" that improved on Prompt. A critic for The Herald had a lukewarm response to Acaster's "deadpan delivery and awkward physical comedy" in a three-star review. The Guardian's James Kettle reviewed him as a "quiet, unassuming" comedian "adept at mixing inspired whimsy with straighter observational material".

While in Edinburgh, Acaster participated in The Wrestling, where a professional wrestler faces a comedian. One stunt involves a metal tray appearing to slam into the comedian's face. In two different years, Acaster forgot to raise his hands to block, so the tray genuinely hit him in the face. Acaster appeared again in The Wrestling at the inaugural 2023 Just for Laughs festival in London, a sister event to the Canadian festival.

=== 2014–2018: Repertoire ===
Acaster's next three Edinburgh shows—Recognise (2014), Represent (2015) and Reset (2016)—formed a trilogy in a shared universe. Recap was added to the sequence in 2017. Acaster assumes a fictional background for each routine, themed around the law: his character works as an undercover cop, serves on a jury, leads a honey-based scam and is put into witness protection. Acaster's corduroy outfits and the background draping are colour co-ordinated: green is used in Recognise, red in Represent, mustard yellow in Reset and all three colours in Recap. Topics for routines include the 2010 Copiapó mining accident, a teabag analogy for Brexit, the existential question of what preceded the Big Bang and the British Empire. There is also more mainstream material, such as the experience of massaging a partner.

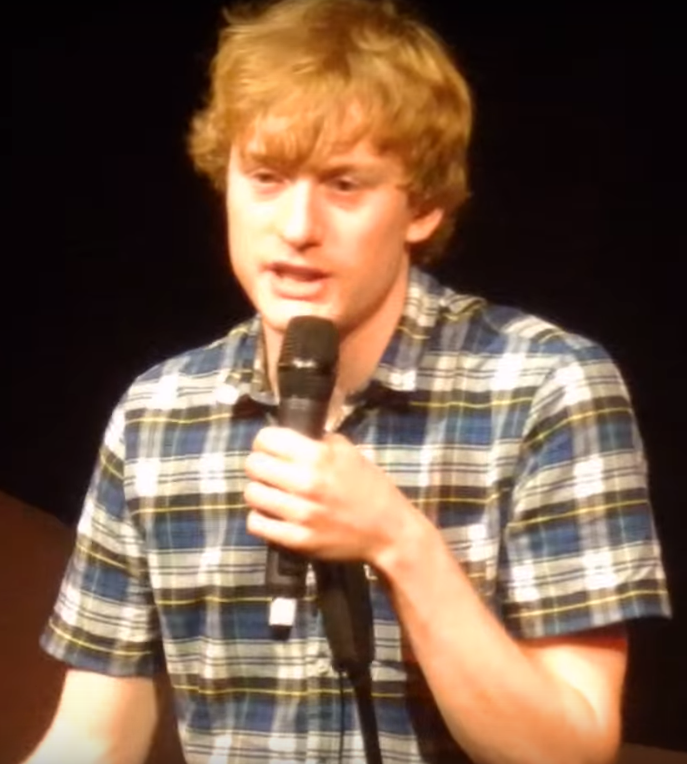
Acaster performing in 2015

The first three shows toured separately, with Acaster writing throughout each year and performing weekly. The overarching narrative was often the first part to be written. Reset's honey routine was conceived as a short story for radio. From January to September 2017, Acaster toured with The Trelogy, performing the first three shows in 14 locations over three nights. He performed them in a cycle at the 2017 Edinburgh Fringe Festival. During The Trelogy, Acaster adapted the routines for narrative cohesion and to suit his faster delivery and new comedic style.

Acaster wrote Recap while touring and began to perform it on the third night. It makes use of his material from 2011 to 2013 and ties together the three preceding shows. The show is inspired by Rogue One, a film that depicts previously known events from the Star Wars universe, and fan theories that each Pixar film is set in the same universe. The recorded version ends with Acaster returning to the setup at the start of the first performance. In March 2018, the four performances were released as a serialised Netflix stand-up comedy special, Repertoire.

As individual performances, the routines received positive attention from critics. Recognise, Represent and Reset were three of Acaster's five consecutive shows nominated for the Edinburgh Comedy Award. Recognise won the New Zealand International Comedy Festival Award for Best International Show and Chortle Awards for Best Breakthrough Act and Best Show. Represent was nominated for a Chortle Award. Hugh Montgomery of The Independent rated Recognise four stars, summarising it as "an acquired taste" of "surreal set-pieces" and "observations as astute as they are trivial" with intelligent callbacks. Another four-star review—by Bruce Dessau in Evening Standard—found Represent to be Acaster's "most conceptually ambitious set yet", with "copious scope for laughs" and "absolute precision" to delivery, including pauses. Rupert Hawksley of The Daily Telegraph praised Reset as Acaster's best show to date, with "sharp punch-lines and meticulously crafted flourishes", albeit a slightly forced ending wherein Acaster delivers a rant to an audience member that is actually about himself.

With Repertoire, Acaster became the first British comic to have multiple stand-up routines released on Netflix. In 2021, it was streamed 840,000 times in the UK, third-most on Netflix for a British comedy special. It received positive reception upon release. Chortle's Steve Bennett praised Recap as continuing Acaster's "uniquely offbeat" material, "precision of focus", nested twists within routines and gradually unfolding narrative. IndieWire's Steve Greene compared it to theatre, lauding its "finely calibrated" jokes with twists—such as putting the punchline before the setup—but writing that some jokes go on too long. Clint Gage reviewed in IGN that Acaster "blends visual aids ... inoffensively" in the "fantastically absurd journey" of the series.

=== 2018–2021: Cold Lasagne Hate Myself 1999 ===
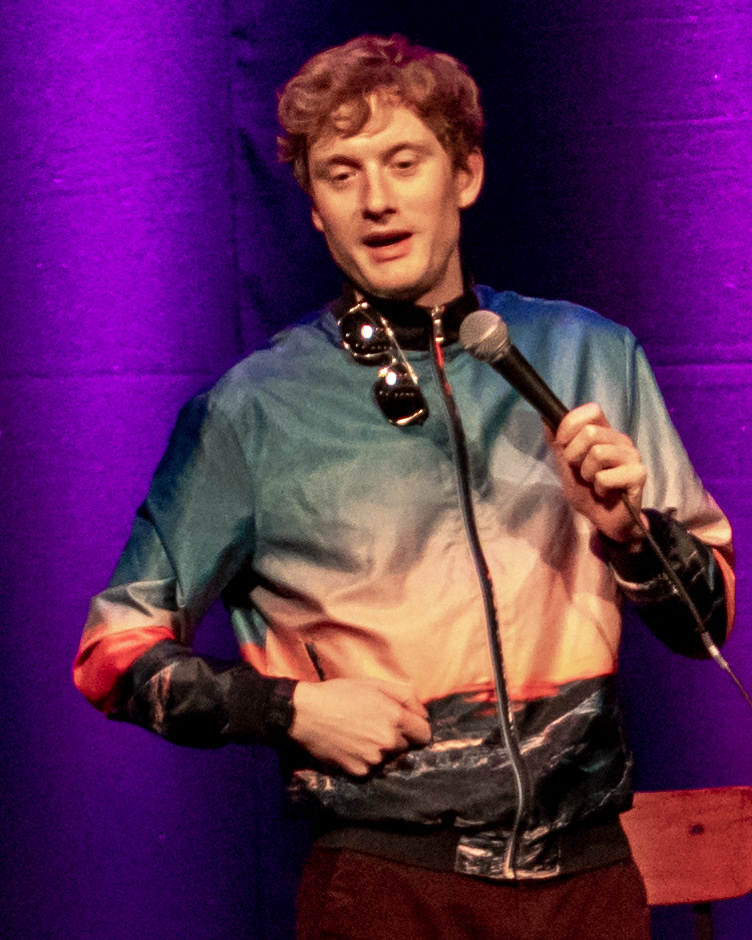
Acaster performing in 2018

In Acaster's next stand-up routine, Cold Lasagne Hate Myself 1999, he discusses his poor experience recording an episode of The Great British Bake Off and the termination of relationships with ex-girlfriends, an agent and a therapist. Mental health is a theme and Acaster is more open about his real life. The show toured in 2018 and 2019. A recorded performance was released in 2019 on DICE, temporarily, and 2021 on Vimeo; the latter is accompanied by Make a New Tomorrow, material cut from the special.

The special received critical acclaim, winning Acaster a Melbourne International Comedy Festival Award and a Chortle Award. Five-star reviews praised Acaster's precise wording, absurdism, unexpected punchlines and narrative structure. A clip from the special of Acaster commenting on "edgy" comedians who attack transgender people went viral.

Hecklers in his increasingly personal routine led Acaster to want a break from performing. During the COVID-19 pandemic, Acaster told interviewers that he did not want to commit to continuing stand-up comedy, with comments like: "Right now I don't want to do it again ever". Lockdown gave him the opportunity to reflect on the anxiety and crowded social spaces of stand-up comedy. However, he did not say he had 'quit'.

=== 2022–present: Hecklers Welcome ===
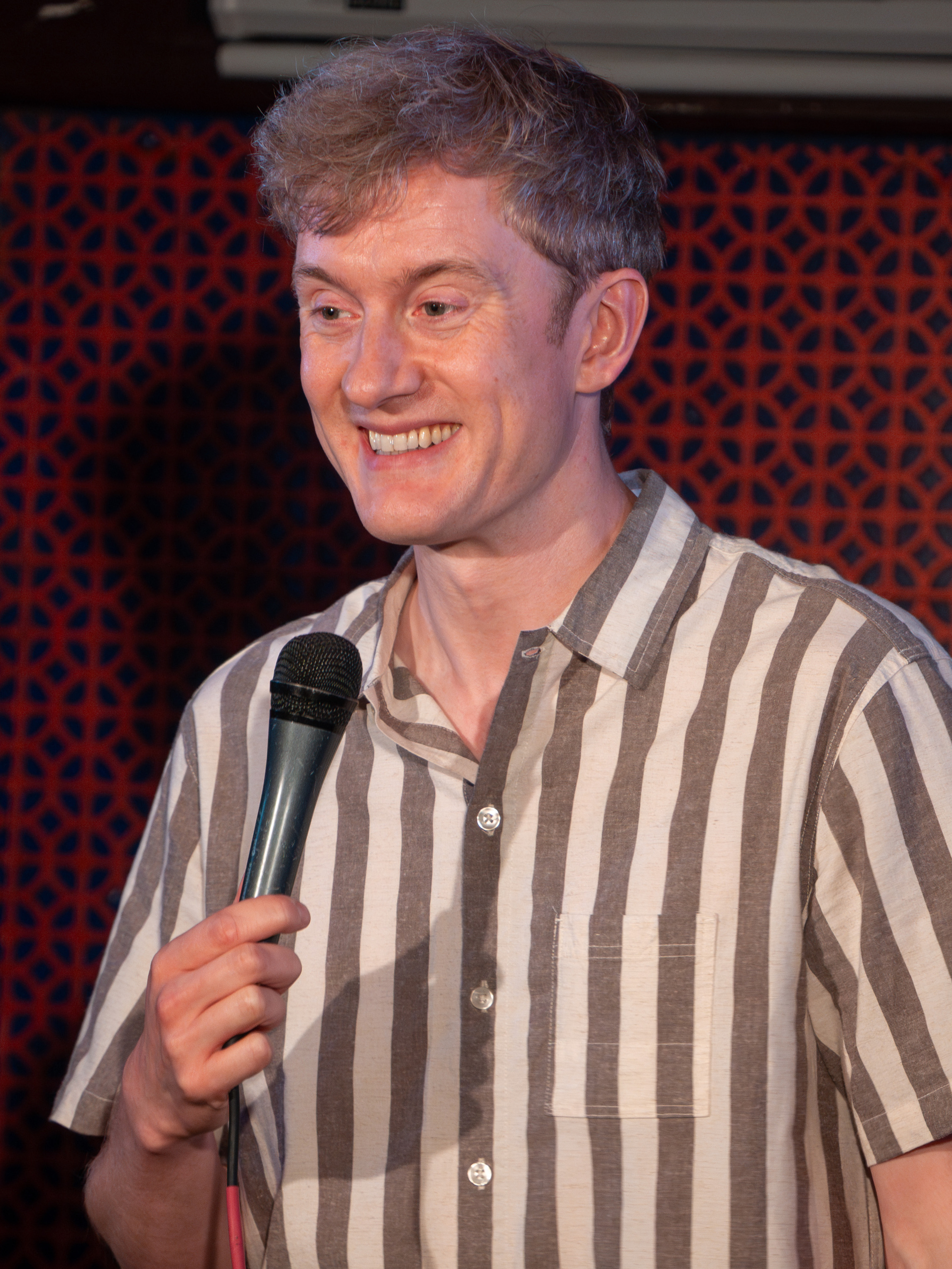
Acaster performing in 2025

In 2022, after performing occasional shows in the UK, Acaster announced a US tour: Hecklers Welcome. To pre-empt his fears of audiences heckling or getting distracted by their phones, he tells them that these things are permitted. Acaster was motivated by an aim to improve aspects of performing stand-up comedy that he did not previously enjoy. Acaster opined that hecklers are largely motivated by giddiness, drunkenness and a belief that it will improve the performance. He noted that some audience members object to the heckling, which is part of the experience. Acaster said that he tries to match the audiences' attitude each night; some audiences choose not to heckle, while other shows are filled with one or multiple people heckling. One audience member threw Maltesers at him and called him a "bitch", evoking a similar incident from 2016, which Acaster said was his worst performance. He has performed the show in Scandinavia and Canada.

The Daily Telegraph gave it five stars, calling it "one of the funniest and most brilliantly constructed shows of the year". It won a 2024 Chortle Award for Best Tour.

== Television ==
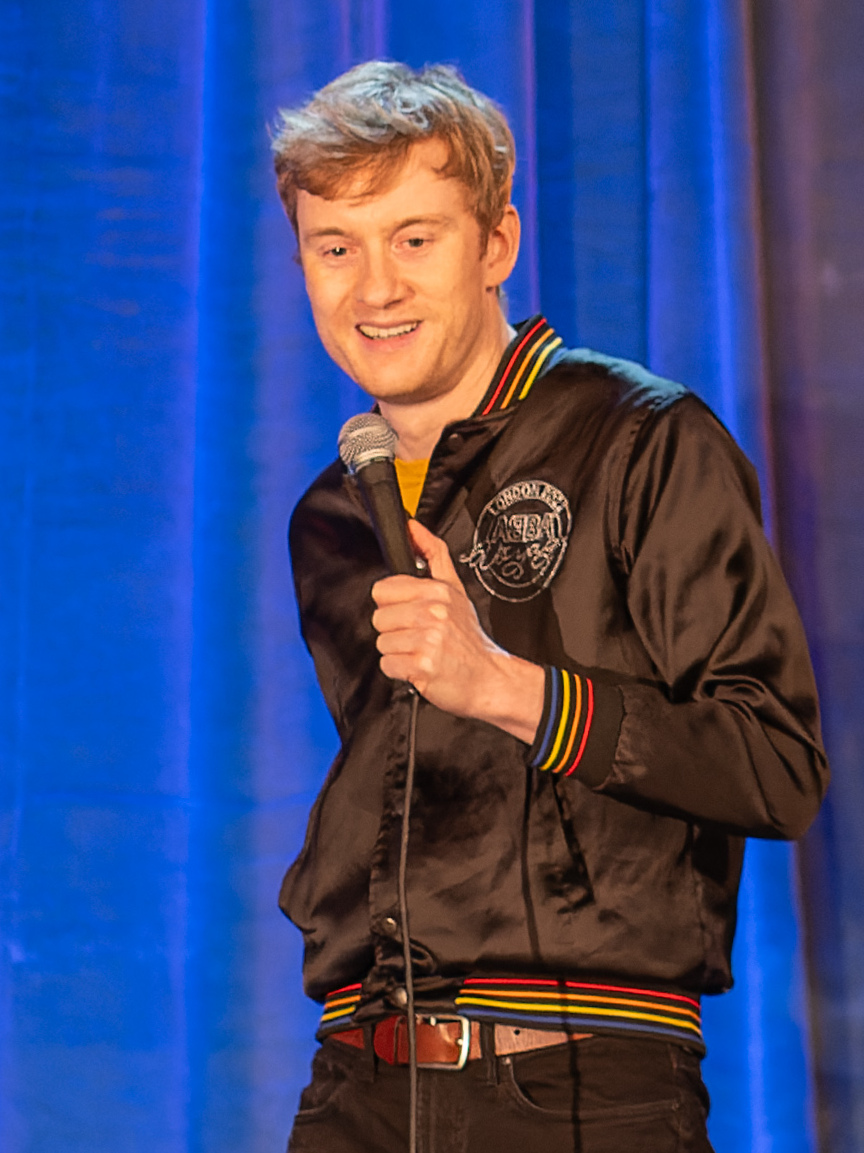
Acaster performing in 2024

=== Panel shows ===
Acaster makes frequent appearances on British panel shows. In his early career, he was most prominent for appearances on Mock the Week (2005–2022). One of his first roles was on Chris Addison's Show and Tell (2011). Acaster said in 2014 that his tour sales saw a huge spike during the broadcast of a Never Mind the Buzzcocks (1996–) episode where he appeared. He was a team captain in an unbroadcast pilot of Virtually Famous (2014–2017), a panel show about the internet, and appeared in two episodes in its first series.

He has also appeared on Would I Lie to You? (2007–), 8 Out of 10 Cats (2005–), Have I Got News For You (1990–), and The Dog Ate My Homework (2014–). Bethy Squires of Vulture reviewed his 2020 appearance on The Big Fat Quiz of the Year as "a great add to the madness", with his unpredictable actions including smearing ice-cream on protective COVID-19 dividers.

Acaster starred in series 7 of Taskmaster (2018), wherein five contestants perform tasks that are judged by Greg Davies, with help from his assistant Alex Horne. Radio Times readers voted in 2022 that the funniest moment of the show was an argument between Acaster and contestant Rhod Gilbert during a team task. In 2021, Paste ranked him as one of the six best contestants, describing his performance as "a mixed bag of aimless mess and point winning turns". Den of Geek reviewers listed Acaster's highlights on the programme: his recurring refusal to greet Horne; the 30-second musical composition "Over My Shoulder" under the name Clump Stump; a live recreation of Grand Theft Auto; and practicing hula-hooping for months.

=== Hypothetical ===
Hypothetical was a panel show on Dave co-hosted by Josh Widdicombe, who conceived the idea, and Acaster. The hosts ask comedian guests absurd hypothetical questions and Acaster awards points according to their responses. The show uses physical comedy and improvisation to play out guests' ideas. Four series aired from 2019 to 2022; the third was filmed under social distancing restrictions. A tie-in podcast, Hypothetical: The Podcast, debuted in May 2022. It saw a guest host asking Acaster and Widdicombe hypothetical questions. A four-star review by Steve Bennett in Chortle praised Acaster as providing a "dash of peculiarity" in his role as Widdicombe's sidekick. Contrastingly, Rachael Sigee's three-star review in i criticised the show as forced in its surrealism and inferior to Taskmaster, where the challenges are played out.

=== Other television ===
Acaster has appeared on a number of gameshows, including Blockbusters (2019) and Pointless (2009–). In 2018, he won Richard Osman's House of Games, wherein four celebrities compete across five episodes. Acaster said Anne Diamond was hostile after he won the first three episodes. After filming, he got drunk, smashed the trophy and gave it to a busker. He discussed his 2019 appearance on The Great British Bake Off in his routine Cold Lasagne Hate Myself 1999, and the mental health issues that he was experiencing at the time. A phrase he used to describe his flapjacks to the judges became a meme: "Started making it / Had a breakdown / Bon appétit." Similarly, fans found his 2022 Celebrity Mastermind performance humorously disastrous. He did not prepare for his specialist subject 'The History of Ice Cream', due to filming commitments, after the programme rejected subjects relating to the comedy of Nish Kumar or Ed Gamble.

The BBC Three series Sounds Random (2016) consisted of 15 short episodes in which Acaster interviews musicians. Using shuffle play on their iPod, the guest describes their relationship to songs. Dances by Acaster and the musician are choreographed to the music. It followed a similar show that Acaster hosted on FUBAR Radio, an internet radio station with a focus on comedy; an executive producer compared it to the radio programme Desert Island Discs (1942–).

In 2016, Acaster wrote a sitcom pilot for BBC Two called We The Jury, about a man who is called to jury duty for a murder trial after dreaming of serving as a juror. The Guardian's Brian Logan said that the writing and "heightened reality" reflected Acaster's comedic style, but was less successful in the medium, while Mark Gibbings-Jones called it "delightfully off-kilter". The Observer's Euan Ferguson panned its "cliched characters and surreal madness". The American channel CBS picked up the idea for a pilot, as Jury Duty, in 2018 and 2020, with Acaster as executive producer. The project has not come to fruition. Also in 2016, Acaster wrote for and narrated a Comedy Central pilot called Funny, Furry and Famous. The programme was a clip show with comedians reacting to viral videos of animals.

For Christmas 2017, Acaster starred in a mockumentary short for Sky Arts about turning on the Christmas lights in Kettering, James Acaster's Xmas.

Alongside Ed Gamble, Lloyd Langford and John Robins, Acaster created The Island (2022), while stuck in New York City due to a snowstorm. The panel show was hosted by Tom Allen and saw four comedians competing to create the best desert island. It was cancelled after one series on Dave, with critics panning the concept.

The documentary The Unofficial Science of Home Alone (2022) saw Acaster, along with the comedian Guz Khan, recreate stunts from the movies Home Alone (1990) and Home Alone 2: Lost in New York (1992). Alex Brooker interviews actors and crew from the original films. Production was initially scheduled for 2021, but the show premiered around Christmas 2022. Acaster described being very nervous during the stunts. Khan and Acaster had both referenced Home Alone in recent panel show appearances. In a three-star review for The Guardian, Stuart Heritage critiqued that the hosts should have been more active participants than "wisecracking observers" led by the engineer Zoe Laughlin. Heritage criticised it as inferior to the experimental science programme MythBusters (2003–2018).

Acaster appeared with Gamble on the fifth series of Celebrity Hunted (2023), which tasked participants with evading "Hunters" around the UK for a fortnight. During their appearance they ate in a Michelin starred restaurant, called into Gamble's Radio X programme, and released a video mocking the Hunters. Acaster also gave Gamble a tattoo. Acaster was caught after goading the Hunters to the Taskmaster house and squirting them with a water gun that he joked contained "piss"; Gamble escaped but was caught soon after. In a two-star review, i's Emily Baker criticised that the pair and the Hunters all put "very little" effort into the game.

Acaster is the voice of Armadillo in the English dub of the Italian animated series This World Can't Tear Me Down (2023).

Acaster appeared on the second series of The Celebrity Traitors in October 2026. He was selected by Maya Jama and Richard E. Grant to become the third Traitor.

As a recurring joke, Acaster announces that it is his birthday every time he appears on the talk show Sunday Brunch.

== Podcasts ==
In addition to tie-in podcasts to his second book Perfect Sound Whatever and the television show Hypothetical, which Acaster hosts, Acaster is known as co-host of Off Menu. His podcast Springleaf is based on his Repertoire character Pat Springleaf.

=== Off Menu ===
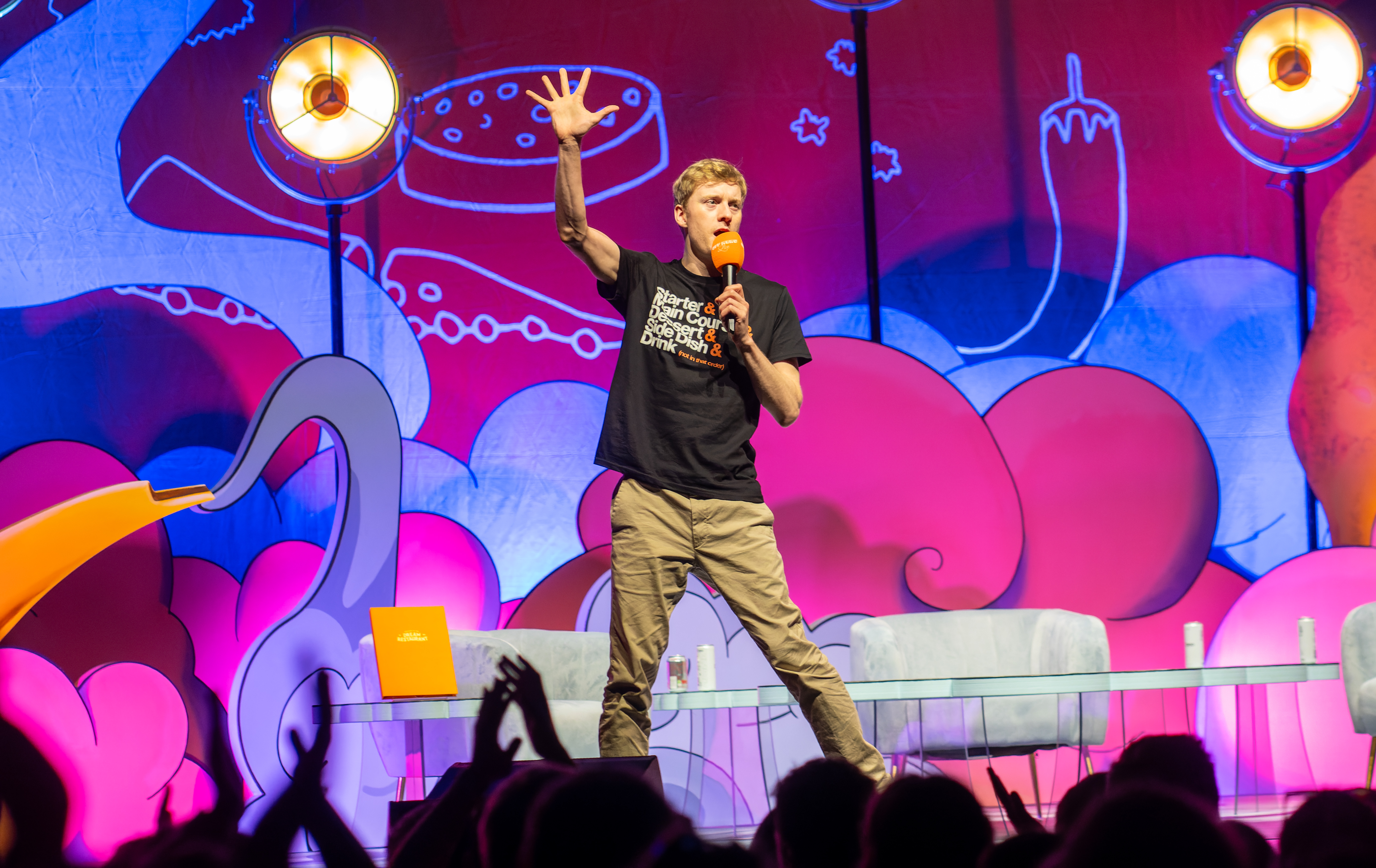
Acaster performing a live show of Off Menu at Royal Albert Hall in 2023

In December 2018, he began a weekly podcast with Ed Gamble called Off Menu. The hosts invite guests to a dream restaurant to give their ideal starter, main course, side dish, drink and dessert. The guest is ejected if they mention a secret ingredient. Acaster, in the role of Genie Waiter, is known for the catchphrase "Poppadoms or bread?", suddenly shouted at each guest.

The podcast has garnered nominations for five British Podcast Awards, two National Comedy Awards and a Chortle Award. It reached 120 million downloads by April 2023. Some episodes have been recorded in front of a live audience: for instance, Off Menu toured for 15 episodes in 2023.

=== Springleaf ===
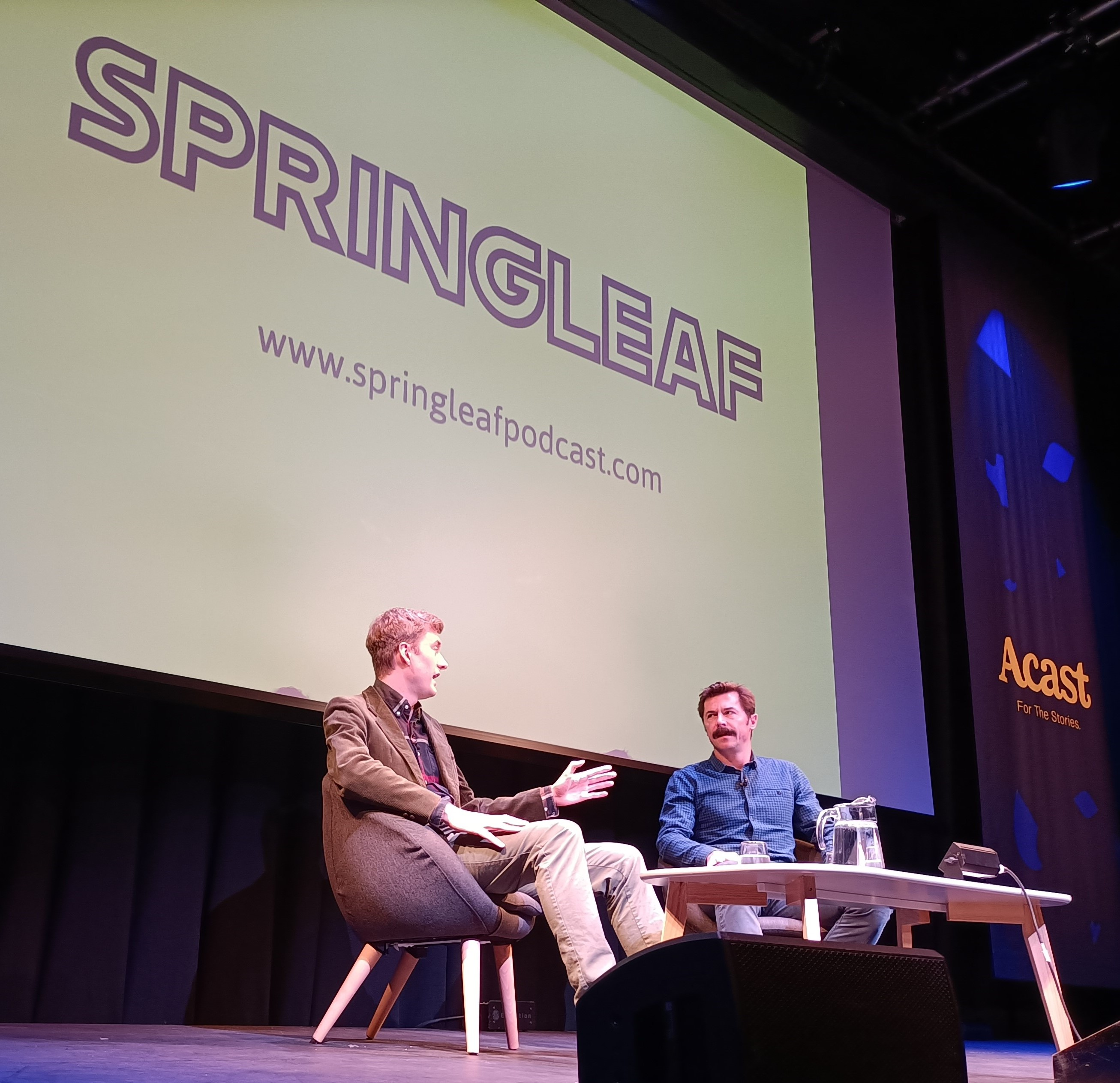
Acaster (left) and Mike Wozniak (right) discuss Springleaf in 2022

Acaster's Repertoire character Pat Springleaf—an undercover cop—was developed in a podcast, Springleaf. The ten-part series debuted in November 2023 with a large number of comedian appearances and cameos. It is presented as a true crime podcast, with the framing device of Springleaf playing wire recordings of his most important case. The Times noted a large number of high-profile names in the cast.

Acaster conceived the podcast while performing Recognise in 2014. The Goon Show (1951–1960), an audio sitcom, was an inspiration; Acaster listened to it as a child and enjoyed that the humour was tailored to the medium. The podcast was crowdfunded through Kickstarter, raising £140,000, and produced by Mighty Bunny. A pilot was recorded with Kemah Bob and Kath Hughes. At 2023 Just for Laughs in London, Acaster improvised as Springleaf with Nish Kumar as co-host.

After its second episode, Springleaf topped the Spotify podcast chart in the UK and Ireland. It was nominated for an Audio and Radio Industry Award in 2024, under the Comedy category. Alexi Duggins of The Guardian recommended it as "a surreal and inventive slice of scripted comedy". Edward Wickham of Church Times analysed that it exploits podcast tropes to play "sophisticated games of subversion and irony", but also has "a charmingly traditional, pantomimic feel to the sitcom, reminiscent of radio comedy from the post-war era".

== Books ==
=== Classic Scrapes ===
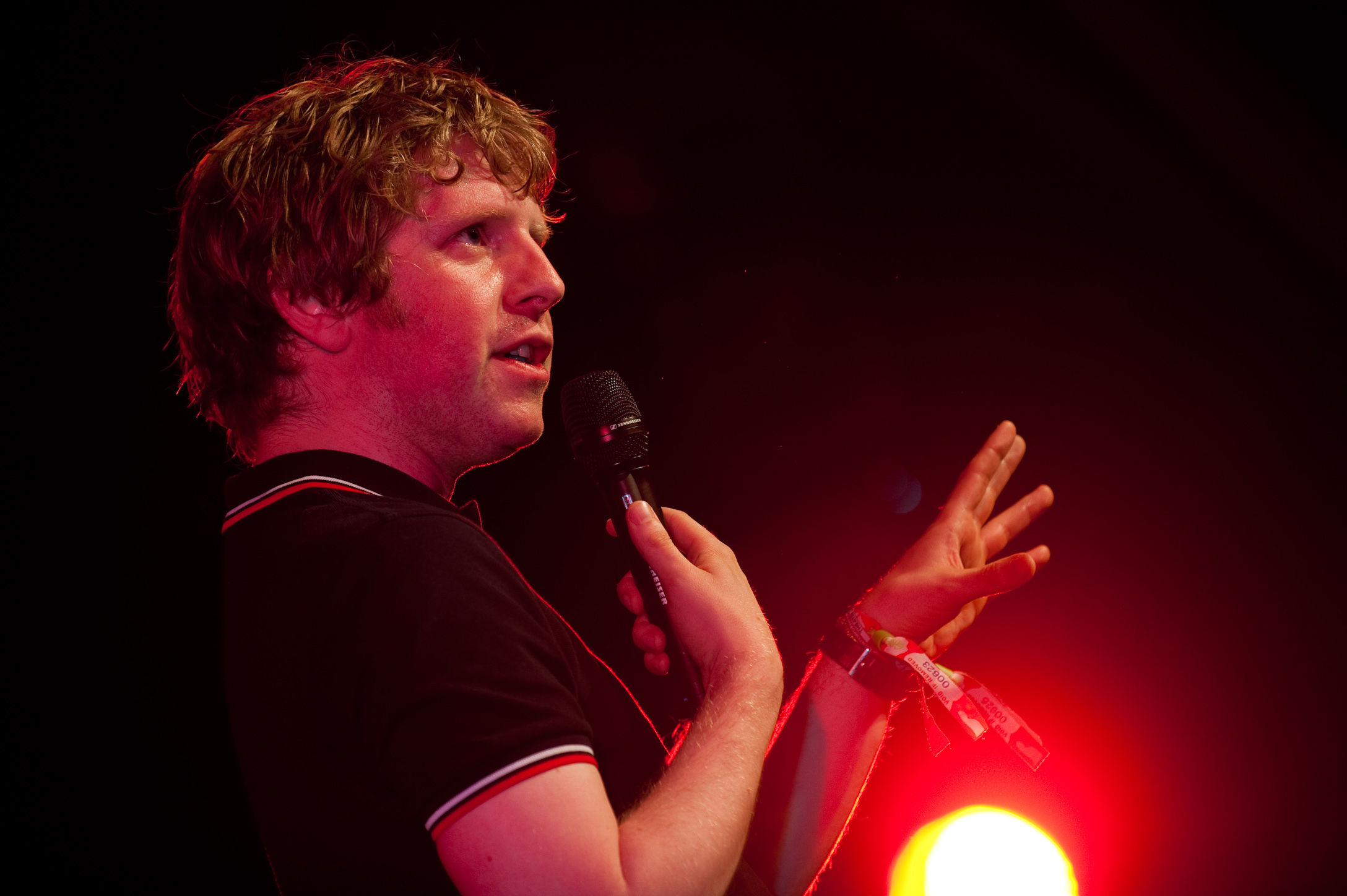
Acaster has worked with Josh Widdicombe (pictured) at their 2009 Edinburgh Festival Fringe show, on XFM radio and as hosts of Hypothetical

His first book, James Acaster's Classic Scrapes (2017), originated from a recurring slot Acaster had on Josh Widdicombe's XFM radio programme, where he became known as the "Scrapemaster". Acaster describes "scrapes" from his life: they vary in severity from getting in trouble at primary school to three car accidents. One anecdote involves a 'cabadging' (cabbage-based) prank war between Acaster and a nine-year-old boy. On the radio, he would describe a mixture of "archive scrapes" and recent stories.

The book compiles Acaster's radio stories in chronological order, with some additional material. It was published in August, followed by a book tour in autumn 2017. Classic Scrapes appeared on The Sunday Times best-seller list and was listed as one of its best books of the year; it was nominated for a 2018 Chortle Award, with Chortle's Steve Bennett finding humour in the "perfect combination of being socially awkward and painfully self-aware".

=== Perfect Sound Whatever ===
Perfect Sound Whatever is Acaster's second book, about an obsessive challenge he undertook in 2017 to collect as much music released in 2016 as possible. His central claim is that 2016 was the greatest year in music. It was published by Headline Publishing Group in August 2019. After a 2017 breakup, Acaster had a mental breakdown and began therapy. He collected over 500 albums released in 2016, such as Lemonade (Beyoncé), Blackstar (David Bowie) and Blonde (Frank Ocean). They also include much more obscure and experimental works, including an album by a teenager that had sold seven copies when Acaster purchased it. Acaster interviewed artists for the book, which he wrote at the comedian Nish Kumar's suggestion.

Jamie Atkins of Record Collector gave the book five stars, saying that Acaster "writes about music beautifully and economically" and "skilfully intersperses" album history with his mental state in 2017. Steve Bennett of Chortle rated the book three stars, calling the personal story "honest, unaffected, poignant – and, yes, entertaining", but commenting that the number of albums mentioned and their obscurity are overwhelming. The book was a Sunday Times Bestseller.

A tie-in podcast, James Acaster's Perfect Sounds, was launched on BBC Radio 1 in April 2020. Acaster asks guests to discuss one of his albums from 2016. Its initial run was 50 episodes. Two Christmas specials were recorded, one with Jeff Rosenstock, whose album Worry featured the track which gave Acaster's project its name: "Perfect Sound Whatever". By the end of the second series, 117 episodes had been produced. The podcast won the 2022 British Podcast Award in the Best Arts & Culture category, with the judges reviewing that it was humorous, had an "innovative format" and a host with "authentic engagement" in the material.

=== Guide to Quitting Social Media ===
In 2022, he published the book James Acaster's Guide to Quitting Social Media: Being the Best YOU You Can Be and Saving Yourself from Loneliness: Vol. 1. Though Acaster did quit social media in 2019, the book is a parody of the self-help genre, motivational speakers, and people who brag about quitting social media. It is told from the perspective of a self-help guru who delusionally believes his life to be perfect. A fictionalised James Acaster, living in a castle, enlists help from his benefactor Clancy Dellahue and the Tangfastic Crew to replace his online friends, spy on ex-girlfriends, bully strangers and view strangers' dog photos.

After giving uninteresting answers in interviews to why he was not on social media, Acaster began to fabricate increasingly elaborate reasons. He developed the book from the concept: "what if you behaved the way you behave on social media in real life?" The book was published on 18 August 2022 by Headline Publishing Group and became a Sunday Times Bestseller. It charted sixth in the Hardback Non-fiction category and first in the Audiobook category.

== Music projects ==
=== Temps ===
In November 2022, Acaster announced a new musical project called Temps, a music collective of 40 musicians. Performing artists include Quelle Chris, Xenia Rubinos, Nnamdi Ogbonnaya (NNAMDÏ) and Shamir. Acaster described the project as neither comedic nor serious. He aimed to give as little direction to the musicians as possible, encouraging them to improvise. Some songs would change tone completely as different musicians added their parts. Acaster combined parts together, with a dozen additional people involved in audio engineering and distribution.

The project began with Acaster retrieving his old drum kit from his parents' house, at their insistence. He began to record drum improvisations. He planned to create a mockumentary with Louis Theroux's production company in which he would transition into the music industry. In the mockumentary, John Kearns would play Acaster's manager and Acaster would pass Seb Rochford's music off as his own. Whilst music with Rochford was recorded, the idea had to be abandoned when the COVID-19 pandemic began. Instead, the project was developed into Temps through email communication with musicians Acaster contacted while working on Perfect Sound Whatever.

Temps' debut 10-track album, Party Gator Purgatory, was released by Bella Union on 19 May 2023 and explores genres including alt-rock, electronica, hip-hop and jazz. Acaster created its artwork with highlighter pens. Music videos were shot by Turtle Canyon Comedy. Initially, they feature Acaster in the 'Party Gator' costume—a lifesized toy alligator that he won at a fair as a child. After Acaster suffered an injured ankle, heatstroke and labyrinthitis, the costume was replaced by a puppet. Four singles were released: "no,no", "bleedthemtoxins", "partygatorresurrection" and "ificouldjust". With the release of the album came a music video for "partygatorRIP".

For Far Out, Tyler Golsen rated Party Gator Purgatory two out of five stars, summarising it as "a random soup that never congeals" due to its lack of direction, large number of contributing artists and combination of genres. However, Golsen identified a minority of songs with an overarching direction and an ambition that was occasionally successful. It was The Quietus's Album of the Week, with Alistair Shuttleworth praising that it was "genuinely excellent" as well as unique. Shuttleworth reviewed it as a "technicolour, maximalist, hugely inventive album" with a "sprightly, playful character" overall, but a number of "unexpectedly moving" commentaries on mental health.

=== The Wow! Scenario ===
On 5 August 2026, the album Stand in the Star. A Verse and a Chorus was announced for release on 23 October 2026. This album, credited to The Wow! Scenario, has been in the works for over 20 years with original sessions dating back to December 2007.

== Other work ==
In 2022, Acaster narrated an audiobook edition of James and the Giant Peach (1961) by Roald Dahl. In a list of the Best Audiobooks of 2022, The Times praised the "great casting".

=== Radio ===
Acaster gained prominence through radio, including his role on Josh Widdicombe's XFM radio programme that led to his first book Classic Scrapes. His half-hour programme James Acaster's Findings (on the same channel) was given a 2013 pilot on the topic "Bread", followed by a series in 2014: "Wood", "Fruit", "Wheels" and "Paint". It also starred Nathaniel Metcalfe and Bryony Hannah.

=== Sweet Home Ketteringa ===
Early in his career, Acaster produced a web series mockumentary, Sweet Home Ketteringa (2014). Acaster revisits his favourite parts of his hometown Kettering, including an amusement park and football club. He speaks to locals, who do not recognise him. By 2016, it had garnered 50,000 views on YouTube. The six-part follow-up web series Sweet Home Lahnsteineringa (2016) was crowdfunded with a budget of £5,000. Acaster visits Lahnstein, Germany, a twin town of Kettering. He first travelled to the town in childhood with the local volunteer fire brigade. The series also starred the comedians Jack Barry and Emma Sidi.

=== Film ===
In 2016, the short story To Do was published in the anthology book Dead Funny: Encore: More Horror Stories by Comedians. In the story, written by Acaster, a crime is revealed through the to-do lists of the murderer and the victim. Acaster turned the story into a screenplay during COVID-19 lockdown, with the aim of adapting it as an independent film.

Acaster's first film role was in Cinderella (2021) alongside the comedians James Corden and Romesh Ranganathan. They voiced three mice and appeared as three transformed footmen. Acaster was a replacement for John Mulaney. In Ghostbusters: Frozen Empire (2024), Acaster played the scientist Dr. Lars Pinfield, a character similar to Egon Spengler. Ian Sandwell of Digital Spy called him an "enjoyable addition to the franchise". He also played Felix the Ironmonger in Seize Them! (2024).

=== Video games ===
In April 2026, it was announced that Acaster would appear in his first video game, Perchang World, a physics puzzle game developed by Perchang Games, providing the voice of "The Narrator". The game was released on Apple Arcade in May 2026.

== Comedic style ==
Acaster has cited as inspirations Eddie Izzard, Josie Long and Ross Noble, all whimsical comedians who deliver unexpected punchlines. Unusually for a stand-up comedian, Acaster incorporates fiction into his material. He uses different personae across his body of work, such as an undercover cop. These personalities vary from whimsical to aloof. He does not laugh at his own jokes: Acaster said in a 2014 interview that it is funnier if comedians "seriously believe this stupid thing they're saying". In 2019, he said that most of his material was developed while onstage; he analyses audience reactions in detail. His wording and delivery is carefully planned.

Critics identified overarching narratives as a commonality to Acaster's routines. Jokes frequently reference earlier material, providing connections between unrelated topics. His material includes one-liners, lengthy stories and audience interaction. His observational comedy topics are offbeat, such as cheese graters or mariachi music, and he focuses on minutiae. He uses repetition as a comedic tool. Acaster makes use of props and physical comedy. He plays with the medium, for example by kneeling for a large part of one routine. A Channel 4 executive named Acaster as a comedian whose work falls between alternative comedy and traditional stand-up, due to his subversion of audience expectations and joke structures.

Acaster told Nouse that his fictional material reflected his personal life unconsciously. In Repertoire, he recognised the connections to his life and reveals them in the routines as a twist: one episode, Represent, is about loss of religious belief, told through a narrative arc of jury service. Harsh or sad material in Acaster's comedy, though explored deeply, arrives unexpectedly or is told through absurdist anecdotes. Acaster's work incorporates politics sparingly, though he has done routines on Brexit. He described to Nouse that at work-in-progress shows, where he often tests political material, the emotional side is more successful than the humorous side.

== Personal life ==
Acaster was in a relationship with the English comedian Louise Ford until 2013; she subsequently began seeing Rowan Atkinson. He then dated the comedian Rose Matafeo; she moved from New Zealand to London in 2015 to live with him, but they broke up in 2017. He spoke on the 'Fwends' podcast in June of 2026 about sharing four cats with his current girlfriend, whom he has also mentioned on his 'Off Menu' podcast.

In an interview with i, Acaster said that he had been open about his mental health with his friends since his teenage years. He thought it would be self-indulgent to do this in his stand-up, but began doing so with Cold Lasagne Hate Myself 1999. In the routine, he discusses experiencing depression and suicidal thoughts while attending regular therapy. He also discussed these topics in his second book, Perfect Sound Whatever. Acaster told BBC News that he did not label anxiety and depression as such when he was younger, or recognise his anxiety in an earlier relationship. His first therapy session was in 2013. In 2026, Acaster stated that he had been diagnosed with autism.

Though raised Christian, Acaster is no longer religious. His routine Represent is indirectly about losing his faith.

== Filmography ==
=== FilmFilmography of James Acaster. ===
Year	Title	Role	Notes
2019	Cold Lasagne Hate Myself 1999	Self	Released on DICE temporarily in 2019 and on Vimeo in 2021
2021	Cinderella	John	
2024	Ghostbusters: Frozen Empire	Lars Pinfield	
2024	Seize Them!	Felix the Ironmonger	
2024	James Acaster: Hecklers Welcome	Self	
2027	Bad Fairies	Stickers	

=== Television ===
Year	Title	Role	Notes
2015	Josh	Mike	1 episode
2015	Drunk History: UK	Self	2 episodes
2016	Sounds Random	Host	Television short; 15 episodes
2017	Absolutely Fine	Delivery Driver	1 episode
2017	James Acaster's Xmas	Host	Television short
2018	James Acaster: Repertoire	Self	4 episodes
2018	Taskmaster	Self	10 episodes
2019	The Great Stand Up to Cancer Bake Off	Self	Series 2, Episode 2
2020	The Big Fat Quiz of the Year	Self	1 episode
2019–2022	Hypothetical	Host	32 episodes
2022	The Unofficial Science of Home Alone	Host	
2023	This World Can't Tear Me Down	Armadillo (voice)	English dub
2025	Badjelly the Witch	Officer Appletree (voice)	2 episodes
2026	The Celebrity Traitors	Himself / contestant (Traitor)	Series 2

=== Audio ===
Year	Title	Role	Medium	Notes
2013–2014	James Acaster's Findings	Host	Radio	5 episodes
2018–present	Off Menu with Ed Gamble and James Acaster	Host	Podcast	
2020–2024	James Acaster's Perfect Sounds	Host	Podcast	
2022	Hypothetical: The Podcast	Host	Podcast	11 episodes

=== Web series ===
Year	Title	Role	Notes
2014	Sweet Home Ketteringa	Host	6 episodes
2016	Sweet Home Lahnsteineringa	Host	6 episodes

=== As writer ===
Year	Title	Notes
2014–2016	Sweet Home Ketteringa	13 episodes
2016	We the Jury	1 episode
2018	James Acaster: Repertoire	4 episodes
2020	Cold Lasagne Hate Myself 1999	
2022	The Island	8 episodes
2024	James Acaster: Hecklers Welcome	

== Bibliography ==
- James Acaster's Classic Scrapes (2017) Headline. ISBN 978-1472247186
- Perfect Sound Whatever (2019) Headline. ISBN 978-1472260307
- James Acaster's Guide to Quitting Social Media (2022) Headline. ISBN 978-1472288561

== Awards and nominations ==
Awards and nominations received by James Acaster
Year	Award	Category	Recipient	Result	Ref.
2012	Edinburgh Comedy Awards	Best Comedy Show	Prompt	Nominated	
2013	Edinburgh Comedy Awards	Best Comedy Show	Lawnmower	Nominated	
2014	Edinburgh Comedy Awards	Best Comedy Show	Recognise	Nominated	
2014	New Zealand International Comedy Festival Awards	Best International Show	Self	Won	
2015	Chortle Awards	Breakthrough Act	Self	Won	
2015	Chortle Awards	Best Show	Recognise	Won	
2015	Edinburgh Comedy Awards	Best Comedy Show	Represent	Nominated	
2016	Chortle Awards	Best Show	Represent	Nominated	
2016	Edinburgh Comedy Awards	Best Comedy Show	Reset	Nominated	
2018	Chortle Awards	Book Award	James Acaster's Classic Scrapes	Nominated	
2019	British Podcast Awards	Best Comedy Podcast	Off Menu	Nominated	
2019	Chortle Awards	Best Show	Cold Lasagne Hate Myself 1999	Won	
2019	Chortle Awards	Comedians' Comedian	Self	Won	
2019	Helpmann Awards	Best Comedy Performer	Cold Lasagne Hate Myself 1999	Nominated	
2019	Melbourne International Comedy Festival Award	Most Outstanding Show	Cold Lasagne Hate Myself 1999	Won	
2020	British Podcast Awards	Best Comedy Podcast	Off Menu	Nominated	
2020	British Podcast Awards	Best Entertainment Podcast	Off Menu	Nominated	
2021	Critics' Choice Television Awards	Best Comedy Special	Cold Lasagne Hate Myself 1999	Nominated	
2022	British Podcast Awards	Best Arts & Culture	James Acaster's Perfect Sounds	Won	
2022	Chortle Awards	Best Podcast	Off Menu	Nominated	
2022	Just for Laughs Awards	Rising Comedy Star	Self	Won	
2022	National Comedy Awards	Best Comedy Podcast	Off Menu	Nominated	
2022	National Comedy Awards	Outstanding Male Comedy Entertainment Performance	Hypothetical	Nominated	
2023	National Comedy Awards	Best Comedy Podcast	Off Menu	Nominated	
2024	Chortle Awards	Best Tour	Hecklers Welcome	Won	
