= Superstruct Entertainment =

British live entertainment company

- Industry: Entertainment
- Founded: 2017; 9 years ago
- Founders: James Barton; Roderik Schlosser
- Parent: KKR & Co.
- Website: www.superstruct.com

Superstruct Entertainment is a British live entertainment company and one of the world's largest festival promoters. As of March 2023, the company had acquired over 85 festivals in Australia and Europe, making it the second-largest festival promoter in the world.

== History ==
The company was founded in 2017 by James Barton, the founder of Creamfields and former Live Nation executive, and Roderik Schlosser of private equity firm Providence Equity Partners, which provided seed funding.

In January 2017 Superstruct bought 70% of Sziget Festival in Budapest, and the following month invested in Spanish electronic music promotions company Elrow.

In June 2018 Providence Equity Partners acquired a majority stake in Spanish festival Sónar.

In August 2018 Superstruct invested in Øyafestivalen in Norway.

In April 2019, the company acquired Victorious Festival, South West Four, Kendal Calling, Truck, Tramlines, Boardmasters, and Hideout festival from Global.

In July 2019 it acquired Next Events, the promoter of Germany's largest electronic music festival, Parookaville.

In August 2019 they acquired International Concert Service, the owners of Wacken Open Air.

In 2021 Superstruct bought Dutch event promoters ID&T from LiveStyle.

In June 2023 Superstruct bought majority stakes in Mighty Hoopla, Cross the Tracks, and Snowbombing.

In June 2024, the company was acquired from Providence Equity Partners by KKR for €1.3bn.

In January 2025, it acquired Boiler Room from DICE for an undisclosed sum. In April 2025, outgoing Channel 4 chief Alex Mahon was named as the new chief executive of the company.

== Boycotts ==
Following the acquisition by KKR, there have been boycotts and backlash by artists, due to its stakes in weapons manufacturing companies, the Coastal GasLink pipeline, and Israeli corporations operating in Israeli-occupied settlements in Palestine. At least fifteen artists dropped out of the 2025 edition of Field Day in protest. The same month Mighty Hoopla issued a statement saying that it stands in opposition of the "unethical investments" of KKR.

== Current properties ==
- Awakenings (festival)
- Bennicassim
- Boardmasters Festival
- Boiler Room
- Cross The Tracks
- Field Day in London, England
- Field Day in Sydney, Australia
- Flow Festival in Helsinki, Finland
- ID&T
- InterStage
- Q-dance
- Hideout Festival
- Kendal Calling
- Lost Village
- Mighty Hoopla
- Milkshake
- Øyafestivalen
- O Son do Camiño
- Parookaville
- Resurrection Fest
- Sónar
- Snowbombing
- South West Four
- Tramlines Festival
- Truck Festival
- Victorious Festival
- Wacken Open Air
- Y Not Festival
- Zwarte Cross
