= James Acaster: Repertoire =

- Genre: Stand-up comedy
- Presented by: James Acaster
- Country of origin: United Kingdom
- Original language: English
- No. of episodes: 4

Original release
- Release: 2018

James Acaster: Repertoire is a serialised stand-up comedy special by British comedian James Acaster. All four parts were released on Netflix in 2018. Repertoire was followed by Cold Lasagne Hate Myself 1999 (2020).

== Synopsis ==
=== Recognise ===
Acaster begins the show by talking about audience placement at a comedy show. Then he discusses his love of loopholes, gives examples of the loopholes he exploits, and tells an anecdote about how he was wronged by a loophole regarding free bananas so he got revenge by starting a banana store that exclusively sells bananas. Acaster changes the subject to childhood and says that he wanted to be an undercover cop as a child, so he told grown ups that he wanted to be a drug dealer. He explains that he started his career as a standup comedian to infiltrate a drug gang that operates backstage on comedy shows. Acaster talks about some of the troubles that one faces in gang life, the problems with conga lines, the connecting fabric between oven gloves, and unbreaking the ice at the end of a conversation.

Acaster laments that his wife left him on National Fondue Day. He talks about his drinking habits and ponders the nature of Dr. Pepper. He also talks about his love for mathematics and how squares can be used to close a cardboard box. To cope with his divorce, he started a podcast using the audio from the wire he wore while talking to the drug gang, and he plays the podcast for the audience. He talks about the one year anniversary of his divorce, when he drove to the beach to put his head in pictures you put your head in. He admits that he's been undercover so long that he doesn't know who he is anymore.

=== Represent ===
Acaster contemplates the origin of the universe in a voiceover. After walking on stage, he engages in celebrity gossip about the Chilean miners. Then he talks about his experience with jury duty. He explains that it came right after he had to move because he had shouted his postcode at a rival gang. Acaster talks about his cinema experience and how he disrupted The Theory of Everything with harsh truth fortune cookies. Then he talks about his night out with the jury, including one juror that's a hype man for a log flume. Acaster also talks about the nighttime routine of shouting "no more jobs" and being ambushed by a spouse wanting a massage.

Acaster describes the people from the jury and tells The Fable of the Goose and the Sloth. He talks about his Christmas with the jury, where they had Secret Santa and a Christingle service. He says that this event brought back his uncertainty from when he was a young Christian boy. As a result, he started playing devil's advocate and saying no pun intended during jury deliberations. Acaster talks about further trouble on the day of the verdict, when he had scheduled a dentist appointment and struggled with the questionnaire. He becomes increasingly agitated and begins making a mess of the stage as he talks about the existential dread that this dentist appointment caused him. Finally, Acaster reenacts a Christingle service.

=== Reset ===
Acaster cleans up the stage and acknowledges that this crowd is the exact combination of spectators that he'd been hoping for. He examines the situation of wells in Kenya versus the United Kingdom and the phrase "he or she". Then he describes his honey business where every few days he would sell the same five jars of honey to the store and then buy them for a lower price, and he explains that he snitched on his employees so now he's in witness protection. He performs a number entitled "The Dos and Don'ts of Passport Photography", and he thinks about where he wants to move. He considers Pisa despite how people pose with the Leaning Tower of Pisa, and he considers New Zealand because they say "boil the jug". Then he tells the story of when the ancestors of modern Brits stole artifacts and put them in a museum. This gets him upset about museum rubbers.

Acaster admits he makes mistakes, such as choosing the right string to open his blinds, and he compares this to the day of the Brexit referendum. His friend had offered to make him a cup of tea but wanted to know if the bag should be left in, improving the cup of tea, or if they should take the bag out, causing it to go directly into the bin. Acaster tells everyone he's going to Loughborough for witness protection where he'll be a lollipop person, as this is a position exclusively for people in witness protection. Then he talks about the term spag bol and how it reflects on the British, and he talks about the kitchen mirror that's handed down in his family. He tells the story of an audience member that's sad because he wanted to move Kenya but stayed in Britain to do stand-up comedy, and finally he ends the segment by playing Auld Lang Syne on a Stylophone.

=== Recap ===
Acaster walks on-stage mid-monologue, talking about how he answers the phone and his dream of being one of the calls monitored for training. He contemplates lip skin, and then he makes a series of bread jokes that he calls his bread research, which segues to pancakes, crepes, and Shrove Tuesday. Acaster brings up his past, saying that he wanted to start an ice cream van where customers get free refills but he drives away before they can be redeemed. Then he talks about his time as a lollipop man with his friends that had to change their names. He explains that he used to live in Kettering, and he performs his own remix of The Kettering Town F.C. Song.

Acaster describes a rumor that British cows can predict the weather but Danish cows can determine what way the wind is blowing. He compares it to the Loch Ness Monster and describes a couple that comes up with hoaxes together. He remembers when he met the woman he would marry and played Twister with her at his friend's surprise party. Then he explains that all lollipop people are promoted to community support officers, and then to undercover cops. He contemplates cheese graters and talks about how he started eating ready to eat apricots. He explains that he's now an undercover cop and he's about to infiltrate a drug gang that operates backstage on comedy shows. Then he pulls out a wood duck and explains in detail how it was used to lure ducks out for hunters.

Finally, Acaster walks off stage, down a hall, and onto the stage from "Recognise".

== Characters ==
Throughout the show, Acaster develops several characters that play a role in one or more segments.

- James Acaster: A fictional version of Acaster. He was forced to go into witness protection after running a fraudulent honey business, changing his name to Pat Springleaf, becoming a lollipop man, marrying an Albanian woman, and working his way up to a position as an undercover cop. As an undercover cop, he gets a job as a stand-up comedian to investigate a gang selling drugs backstage at comedy shows using the undercover name James Acaster. He loses himself while undercover, and his wife divorces him. After yelling out his postcode at a rival gang, he is forced to go into witness protection again. When he served on a jury, he went by the name Wolf so as not to be confused with James 1.
- The Captain: Acaster's supervisor at Scotland Yard. He works undercover as a comedy booker.
- The SW6 Gang: A gang that sells drugs to comedians backstage at comedy shows. Acaster infiltrates the gang as an undercover cop. Their leader is Laurence, who ends arguments by adding the "shmuh" sound to the beginnings of words. Other members include Huey, Reg, and Mr. Mason. Ted was a member, but he was killed after they believed he was a rat.
- The Chilean Miners: The miners that were trapped in the 2010 Copiapó mining accident. Acaster considers them to be prime subjects for celebrity gossip.
- The Jury: The jurors that Acaster served alongside during his jury duty. Acaster's favorite member of the jury was James 1. Acaster's least favorite member of the jury was Lucas, who slags people off to their faces. Oliver is a Christian that invites them to a Cristingle service. Other jurors included Daniel, Jan the teacher, Bill the bus driver, Hugh the hype man for a log flume, and Gwen the masseuse.
- The Goose and the Sloth: Talking animals that teach a moral in The Goose and the Sloth. The Sloth is nimble and spins a web in the jungle, but it became slow after the Goose slags it off. The Goose has four hooves and slags off the sloth. Other animals include the Crocodile and the Pig.
- Sean: Acaster's partner in the fraudulent honey business for ten years. Sean sold the honey while Acaster bought the honey. He has to go into witness protection after the police find out about the business. He has high confidence because other people don't know how to spell his name. After entering witness protection, he becomes a lollipop man and changes his name to Darrell.
- Clim Bellagio: The bee that made the five jars of honey.
- Little Bits: One of Acaster's friends. He was originally named Jack before changing his name to Brian and working as a lollipop man. He was given the nickname Little Bits by a child that he helped cross the road. The lollipop people throw a surprise party for Little Bits when he gets promoted to community support officer.
- Peter: A lollipop man from Denmark that got transferred to Loughborough.
- Mr. and Mrs. Spicer: A real life couple that claimed to see the Loch Ness Monster cross the road. Acaster speculates that they planned to do a Loch Ness Monster hoax while stomping crop circles into the ground.
- Kyle: A duck with a wife and seven little ducklings. He meets a wooden duck in the Bluebell Woods on the way to forgive his father and gets shot by a hunter.

== Production ==
All four segments were recorded at The Tabernacle in Notting Hill, London. Acaster recorded all four segments in a single day over a period of about nine hours, and he then recorded all four segments again the next day to serve as backup footage. The first three segments of the show were based on material that Acaster had performed during tours, while the fourth was an original addition that heavily incorporated references to the events of the first three. Acaster says that this fourth segment was inspired by the Star Wars film Rogue One, in which the events play off previous films in the Star Wars franchise. Acaster later said that he was struggling during the production of Repertoire due to a recent break up and his intense work schedule. For the two days of recording, he performed from around 3 p.m. to midnight. It was the first time he had performed all four shows to the same audience.

Each segment focuses on a different aspect of the criminal justice system: undercover police work, jury duty, and going into witness protection, respectively. Despite being filmed back to back, Acaster uses a different colour coded background and outfit in each segment. The first three segments use green, red, and yellow, respectively, while the fourth uses all three colors.

Joe Parham, Pat Cahill, and Nathaniel Metcalfe lent their voices for the podcast in Recognise alongside Acaster and producer Stuart Laws.

Acaster said that the filming aimed to capture elements of live performance, with no added laughter.

== Reception ==
In 2021, Repertoire was streamed 840,000 times in the UK, third-most on Netflix for a British comedy special.

Repertoire received generally positive reviews from critics. It was praised for its unconventional approach to stand-up comedy and its innovation in the genre. The meta-narrative of the show and the twist ending were particularly well received. Paste's Shane Ryan lauded it as combining stand-up and theatre, utilising recurring themes and rewarding attentive viewers with "intense craftsmanship".

Acaster has said that he's received negative feedback from supporters of Brexit for his segment on the topic. After the special was released, a tweet by Acaster's father went viral in which he said "He's not for everyone but he works hard".
