= Boiler Room (music broadcaster) =

Online music broadcaster and club promoter

- Industry: Music & Entertainment
- Founded: March 2010
- Founder: Blaise Bellville; Thristian Richards
- Headquarters: London, England
- Area served: Worldwide
- Parent: DICE (2021–2024); Superstruct Entertainment/KKR (2025–present)
- Website: boilerroom.tv

Boiler Room is an online music broadcaster and club promoter based in London, United Kingdom. It hosts predominantly dance music events, focusing on underground genres, in locations internationally, with live streaming.

Since it was founded, it has organized more than 8,000 performances, with 5,000 at more than 200 cities. Its music programming originally focused on dance music but eventually expanded to include others genres such as hip hop, jazz and classical.

== History ==
=== 2010–11: Foundation and expansion ===
The project started in 2010, when Blaise Bellville asked Thristian Richards to livestream a mix for a magazine. Boiler Room's first session in March 2010 turned into a weekly show with local DJs, becoming a Ustream channel.

Later the same year, producer and DJ Floating Points played Boiler Room's second ever edition, the recording of which was subsequently lost.

Early in 2011, the Rolling Stone magazine added Blaise to its list of "50 Most Important People In EDM". Boiler Room founders started expanding the project to more cities, replicating their initial model in Berlin with local DJs, and then other cities like Los Angeles and São Paulo.

=== 2012–20: Growth ===
The early focus on the underground music scene and electronic music in London broadened to other genres such as hip hop, jazz and classical.

On 27 and 28 February 2016, Boiler Room live streamed DJ EZ's 24-hour DJ set which raised over £60,000 on behalf of Cancer Research UK. In May 2016, Boiler Room live streamed Skepta's launch party for the Konnichiwa album in Tokyo.

Boiler Room launched in China with a show in Beijing in April 2016 followed by a show in Shanghai with Disclosure in May 2016.

In August 2016, Boiler Room live streams covered 42 hours of various soundsystems at the Notting Hill Carnival.

Boiler Room's first full-length documentary, on Atlanta based collective Awful Records, launched in June 2016. Boiler Room has since continued producing TV shows and documentaries aimed at telling stories tied to the people, artists and culture. This includes shows like Gasworks, a 20-minute, grime-focused talk show starring Alhan Gençay & Poet.

In 2018, Boiler Room launched '4:3', a platform for film, documentary and music videos, with Amar Ediriwira as its creative director. In 2019, the first 'Boiler Room Festival' was announced in Peckham, London. The event showcased a different underground scene each day, across contemporary jazz, rap, and dance genres.

=== 2021–24: Under DICE ===
In 2021, ticketing platform DICE bought Boiler Room for an undisclosed sum, after raising $122 million

In 2023, it launched its first World Tour with 20 shows across several cities, including New York City, Paris, Amsterdam, Seoul, Mexico City, Mumbai and Bristol. The 2024 World Tour expanded to 25 cities: London, Mumbai, Manchester, Milan, New York, Seoul, Toronto, Sydney, Melbourne, Amsterdam, Auckland, Barcelona, Bogotá, Buenos Aires, Paris, Tokyo, Glasgow, São Paulo, Shanghai, Delhi, Lagos, Los Angeles, Chicago, Las Vegas and Miami.

Charli XCX's February 2024 Boiler Room performance, titled "Partygirl" and held in a Bushwick, Brooklyn, warehouse in New York, received more than 25,000 RSVPs, the largest number in Boiler Room's history.

=== 2025–present: Under Superstruct ===
DICE subsequently sold Boiler Room to Superstruct Entertainment in January 2025 for an undisclosed fee.

The acquisition was received with criticism because Superstruct's parent company, Kohlberg Kravis Roberts (KKR), has financial interests in Israel and occupied Palestinian territories, and the sale occurred during the Gaza war. Several artists, including Ikonika, Beatrice M., Mia Koden, BasicDisarm, jtamul, DJ Sama' and 8ULENTINA canceled their appearances at Boiler Room over this. In March, Boiler Room released a statement, saying "we will always remain unapologetically pro-Palestine".

== Awards ==
Boiler Room and its projects have received a number of awards and nominations:

Boiler Room

- 2016 Webby Awards: Honoree – Websites and Mobile Sites, Music

4:3

- 2018 Lovie Awards: Gold and People's Lovie – Culture & Entertainment websites
- 2019 Lovie Awards: Silver and People's Lovie – Culture & Entertainment websites
- 2019 Webby Awards: Nominee – Websites and Mobile Sites, Music
- 2019 Digiday Media Awards: Nominee – New Vertical

Migrant Sound

- 2019 Webby Awards: Winner – Social, Culture & Lifestyle (Campaigns)

Contemporary Scenes

- 2019 Webby Awards: Winner – Social, Music

Individual and team awards

- 2018 The Drum Digerati – Stephen Mai (Top 100 in Digital)
- 2019 Campaign's Power 100 – Stephen Mai (Top 100 in Marketing)
- Jodie Nicholson – Alternative Power 100 Music List
- Video Team of the Year – Digiday Media Awards
