= Manchester United F.C. mascots =

Football mascot

Manchester United F.C. is a football club based in Old Trafford, Greater Manchester, England. Founded as Newton Heath F.C. in 1878, the club has had several mascots; the most recent is "Fred the Red", an anthropomorphic "Red Devil", after the club's nickname, the Red Devils.

== Michael the Bank Street Canary (1890s) ==
During the 1890s, readers of Newton Heath F.C. match programmes may have seen advertisements to hear "Michael the Bank Street Canary sing" for a nominal fee. However, Michael was not able to sing, nor was he a canary. In actuality, Michael was a goose and was an unwitting participant in the money-making schemes that the club were using during their financial difficulties. Fans who had paid money to hear a canary sing were unimpressed by Michael's tuneless honk, and was removed as the mascot shortly thereafter.

== Major the Saint Bernard dog (1902–1905/06) ==
Major was the prized Saint Bernard of Newton Heath's club captain and full-back, Harry Stafford, and played a pivotal role in changing the club's name, colours and stadium. Still in financial difficulty, Stafford would send his dog around the crowd with a collection box on its collar in the hope of bringing in much-needed extra funds. Then, in 1901, the club held a fundraising bazaar, at which Major did his usual rounds with the collection box. However, the bazaar was a "rank failure", as described by the archives of the Topical Times, and by the end of it, Major had gone missing.

Stafford went out looking for his prize dog, and eventually found him in the possession of local brewer John Henry Davies, who wished to keep Major as a pet for his daughter. Stafford convinced Davies to invest £500 in Newton Heath F.C. in order to guarantee the club's financial security for the immediate future and in return gave Davies the dog. Davies was appointed chairman, and eventually renamed the club Manchester United F.C. in 1902, changing the club colours to red and white. Major was eventually retired as club mascot during the 1905–06 season.

== Billy the Goat (1905/06–1909) ==
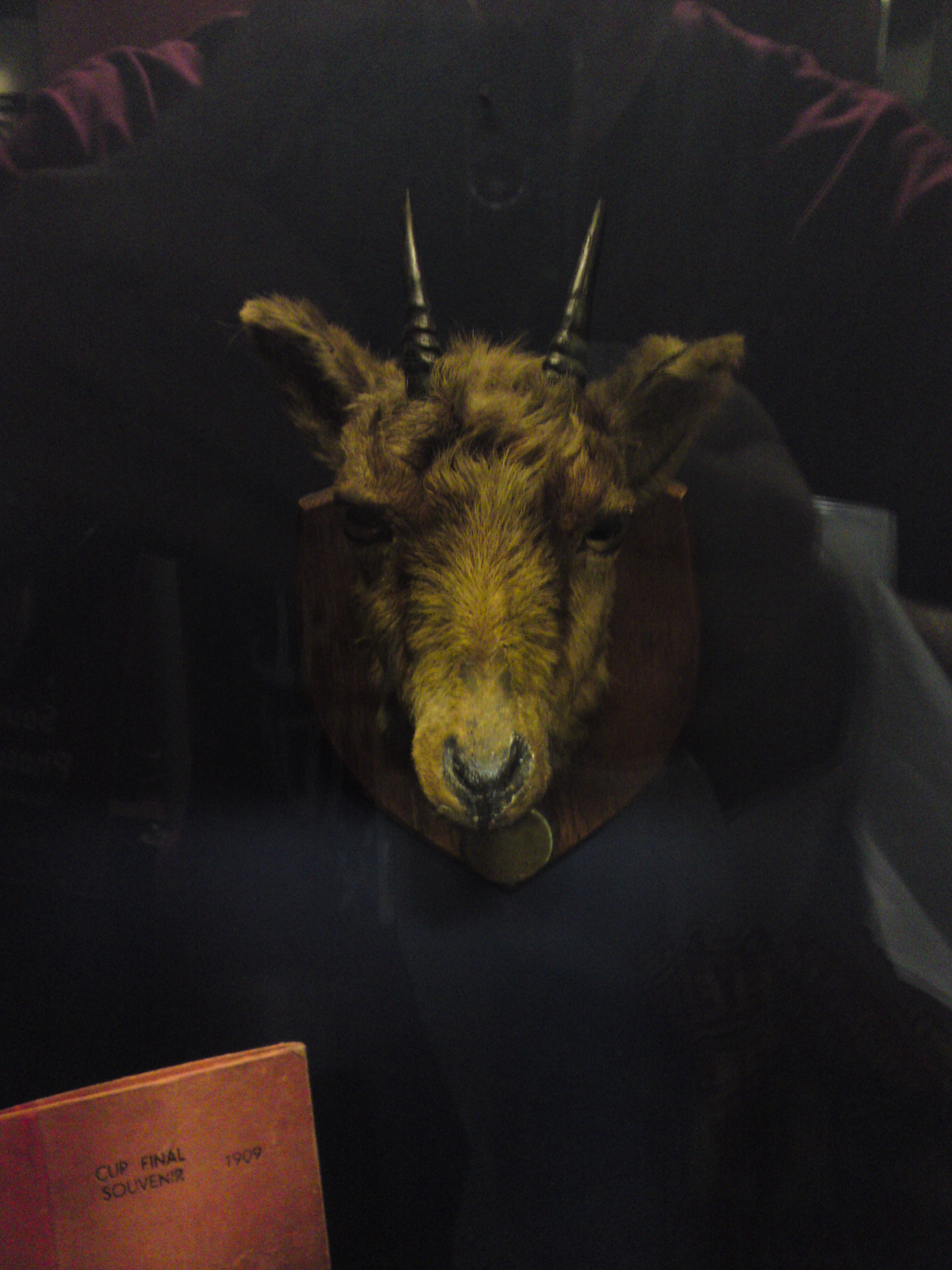
Billy the Goat's preserved head on display in the Manchester United museum

Following the retirement of Major, the club decided to adopt a new mascot. Half-back Charlie Roberts had recently been given a goat by The Bensons, a theatre company. Why Roberts was given a goat, and why a theatre company gave it to him, is unknown, but he named the goat "Billy", and Billy the Goat became the third club mascot. Like Major before him, Billy was paraded around the ground before home matches.

Records show that Billy travelled to ale houses with the team on numerous occasions. After the 1909 FA Cup Final win over Bristol City, Billy took part in the post-match celebrations with the players, but drank too much champagne and died of alcohol poisoning soon after.

== "Hoppy" Thorne, the One-legged Wonder (late 1930s–late 1940s) ==
William "Hoppy" Thorne was a British soldier during the First World War. He was too young to join the army at the start of the war, but nonetheless signed up under a false name. He lost a leg in combat, and was marked as an invalid on his return to Britain. This status meant that few employers would give him any work, but he managed to find work at Old Trafford, sweeping up after home matches and operating the scoreboard at reserve team matches.

Hoppy became well known among the players and fans with pre-match entertainment. Before home matches, he would strip off his clothes, down to his running gear, jump over the fence around the playing surface, and hop or run around the pitch, depending on whether he'd attached his false leg or not.

Hoppy's tenure as club mascot came to an end towards the end of the 1940s. He failed to receive tickets for the 1948 FA Cup Final in the members' ballot, and as a result, an irreconcilable rift formed between him and the club.

== Jack Irons (late 1940s–1963) ==
John Thomas "Jack" Irons was the Manchester United mascot for around 15 years. He would parade around the pitch in a red-and-white dinner suit before kick-off, holding a red-and-white umbrella while signing autographs and greeting the fans, and even tossing the coin for the kick-off on occasion.

It is unknown how or when Irons became the club mascot, but according to the Club Minutes Book for 9 May 1963, Irons "had decided to retire at the end of the present season [1962–63]. It was decided to make a presentation to him up to the value of £25-0-0d." He made a one-match comeback for the 1968 European Cup Final, but there is no further record of his association with the club.

Frank Hilton and Ronnie McWilliams both had spells "under the umbrella", but the practice of the "friendly mascot" had to be abandoned soon after, due to the rise of hooliganism in the United Kingdom.

== Fred the Red ==
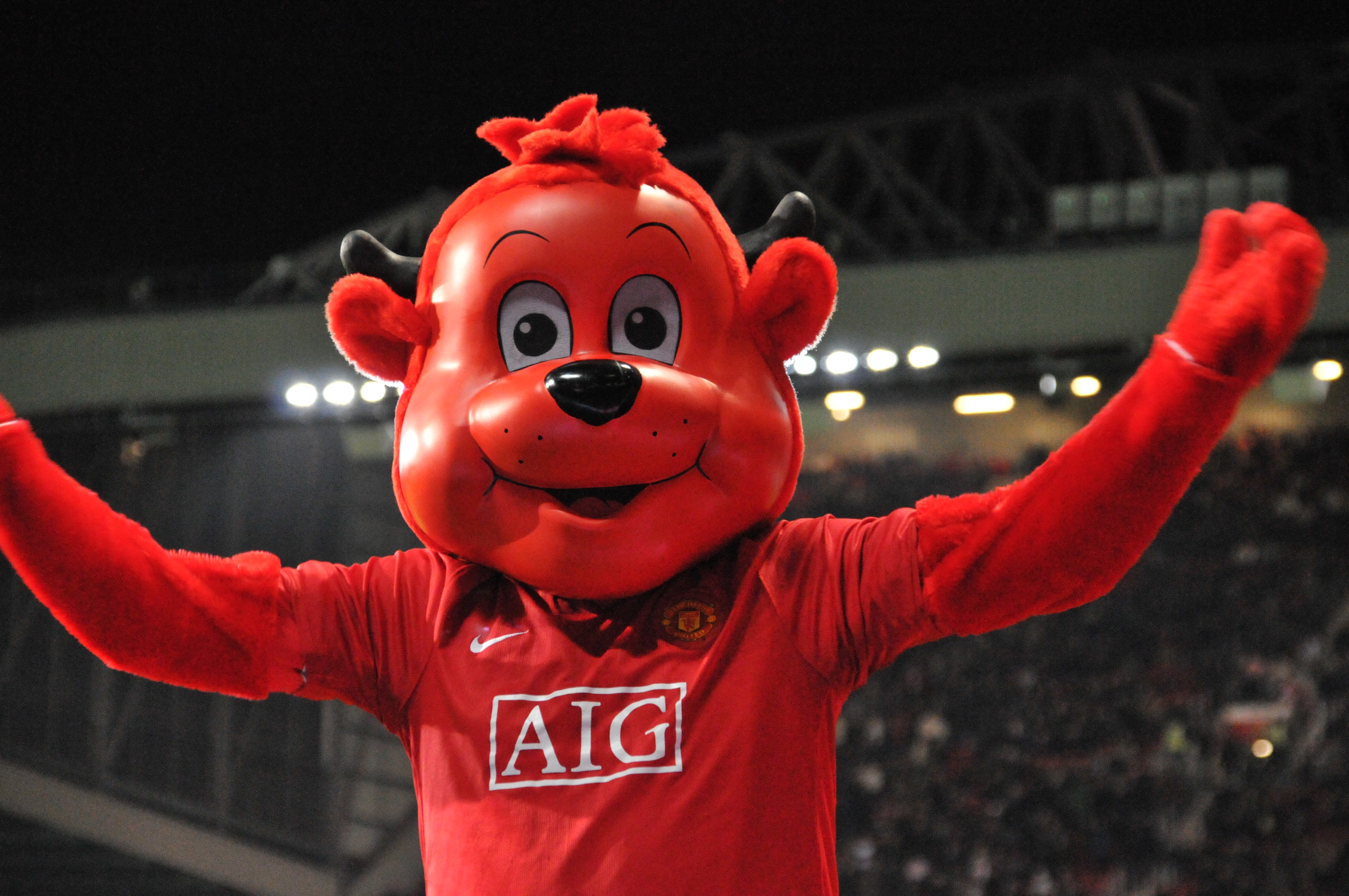
Fred the Red

Since the early 1990s, the Manchester United mascot has been Fred the Red, an anthropomorphic "red devil", in reference to the club's nickname, The Red Devils. He appears in full kit with the number 55 on the back of his shirt, and entertains the crowd before matches. His likeness is used in the club's merchandising, especially on items targeted towards children. He was voted the most popular mascot in Match magazine in 2011.
