= Dice (ticketing company) =

British ticketing company

Dice FM Holdings Ltd
- Trade name: DICE
- Formerly: Dice Trading Limited (February–April 2014); Dice FM Ltd (2014–2023)
- Type: Private
- Industry: Mobile ticketing
- Founded: 21 February 2014; 12 years ago in Thames Ditton, Surrey, England
- Founders: Phil Hutcheon
- Headquarters: London, England
- Key people: Tony Fadell (Board member, 2021-present), Xavier Niel (Investor)
- Services: Electronic ticketing; Video streaming
- Owner: Fever
- Number of employees: 122 (2017); ▲360 (2021); ▲480 (2022)
- Website: dice.fm

Dice FM Holdings Ltd, trading as Dice (stylized as DICE), is a ticketing software company based in London, United Kingdom. Its web and mobile technology products enable users (often referred to by the company as fans) to search, browse and buy tickets to all kinds of live events, including concerts, festivals, comedy shows and other types of performances or talks. Dice gained popularity as a ticketing app for its strong stance against scalping, implementing guardrails within its products to limit fraud and price gouging.

During the global COVID-19 pandemic, Dice temporarily pivoted as a live streaming service where fans could buy tickets to access private shows from artists like Kylie Minogue, Bicep, Lewis Capaldi or Nick Cave. Dice moved on to acquire live music broadcaster Boiler Room in 2021. Dice subsequently sold Boiler Room to Superstruct Entertainment in January 2025 for an undisclosed fee.

In September 2021, Dice completed its Series-C funding, raising $122 million with SoftBank Vision Fund, Nest co-founder and iPod inventor Tony Fadell as well as French billionaire entrepreneur Xavier Niel. Early investors include DeepMind co-founders Mustafa Suleyman and Demis Hassabis, and software development studio Ustwo.

In May 2023, DICE was appointed the primary ticketing partner for London venue Alexandra Palace.

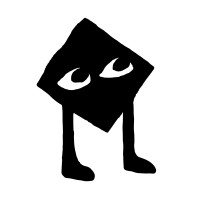
"The Fan", Dice's secondary logo and mascot

== Founder ==
Phil Hutcheon founded Dice in 2014. Prior to founding Dice, Hutcheon spent over 10 years working in the music industry running Modular Recordings and latterly his own record label, management and events company Deadly People. The company is based in De Beauvoir, in Dalston, London with other offices in Europe. In September 2017, Dice launched into the United States with events in San Francisco and Los Angeles, California. In 2021, Dice opened a North American office at 10 Grand Street in Brooklyn, New York due to the growth of their American office of employees.

== Acquisition by Fever ==
In June 2025, Dice was acquired by Fever, a global live entertainment discovery and ticketing platform.. Since the acquisition Dice has gone on to make a series of partnership announcements, including Apple Music Hall the new Apple music venue in Battersea, and won Ticketing Company of the Year at the 2026 Music Week Awards.

== Services ==
=== Discovery feed ===
Users of the Dice app can search, browse and buy tickets in for upcoming live shows. Spotify and Apple Music integrations allow fans to sync up their artist preferences so the app can suggest event recommendations on its homepage.

=== Secured mobile tickets ===
Tickets are purchased from the Dice website, or within the mobile app.

They exist on the user's smartphone as a QR code which also includes the date, time and location of the event. Depending on events, tickets can be either transferred to other users or resold through the waiting list feature.

Dice forces users to download its phone app to make use of purchased tickets, and provides no means to see the ticket's QR code through a PDF, email or downloadable image. In addition, tickets need to be activated in-app prior to be scanned, leading to QR codes only being displayed for a limited amount of time, right before the event start time and the ticket being scanned.

=== Waiting list and reselling system ===
Customers can add themselves to a waiting list for sold-out shows. If users are no longer able to attend a show they can return their tickets to Dice; these tickets are then passed on those who have added themselves to the waiting list on a first-come, first-served basis. As the ticket purchased exists only within the app, it is necessary to have it installed in order to be allowed entry to the relevant event.

All tickets sold on Dice are sourced directly from labels, promoters and venues; the company does not participate in secondary ticketing.

As of 2023, the Dice app is available in Western Europe (United Kingdom, France, Spain, Portugal, Italy, Germany) as well as North America (United States). Some shows are occasionally available in other territories like India or Australia.

== Dice Live Awards ==
From 2016 to 2022, Dice organised the Dice Live Awards, a ceremony awarding best live music act showcased on the platform.

“The Dice Live Award is just about the artists. No dinner, no long speeches, no other awards… just an opportunity to recognise the brilliance of an artist who has truly broken through with amazing live performances. There’s nothing like it.Being a great artist isn't only about creating music in a studio, but also having the charisma and talent to deliver performances that people will remember for years to come.” - Phil Hutcheon (CEO) and Andrew Foggin (Global Head of Music), Dice

Dice Live Awards Wins and Nominations
Year	Winner	Nominated
2022	Self Esteem	Shygirl, Fred Again, Gabriels and Obongjayar.
2021	Dave	
2019	Little Simz	
2018	Loyle Carner	
2017	Slowthai	
2016	Wolf Alice	

== Industry awards ==
Awards granted to Dice
Year	Organisation	Award
2026	Music Week	Best Ticketing Company
2016	Music Week	Best Ticketing Company
2015	Apple Inc. (App Store)	App of the Year
2014	The Guardian	Best App of the Year
