= Perfect Sound Whatever =

2019 book by James Acaster

- Front cover
- Author: James Acaster
- Audio read by: James Acaster
- Language: English
- Subject: Autobiography
- Publisher: Headline Publishing Group
- Publication date: 22 August 2019
- Publication place: United Kingdom
- Media type: Print; Audiobook
- Pages: 304
- ISBN: 1472260309

Perfect Sound Whatever is a 2019 book by James Acaster charting his project to catalogue the music of 2016, with the aim of proving that 2016 was 'the best year for music ever'. The book is named after the song of the same name by Jeff Rosenstock.

== Synopsis ==
In 2017, Acaster broke up with his girlfriend and terminated his relationship with his agent. He was also exhausted from recording several live stand up specials and an unrelenting touring schedule. This combination of events left him feeling depressed and lost. Acaster found solace in purchasing music albums from the year 2016, initially as an effort to reconnect with music, something he had previously got great joy from, and felt that he had lost. Eventually, this project saw him purchasing over 500 albums from various artists and genres, the only thing connecting them being the publication year of 2016. Eventually, Acaster becomes convinced that 2016 was 'the best year for music ever'.

The book lists all the albums that Acaster purchased as part of his project, with a brief description of each one, accompanied by various stories from Acaster's earlier life, his experience playing in the band 'The Wow! Scenario' and the events that led up to the project.

== Albums featured in the book ==
- Worry by Jeff Rosenstock
- The Dreaming Room by Laura Mvula
- Lemonade by Beyoncé
- Blackstar by David Bowie
- Splendor & Misery by Clipping
- The Life of Pablo by Kanye West
- A Seat at the Table by Solange Knowles
- Untitled Unmastered by Kendrick Lamar
- Telefone by Noname
- The Party by Andy Shauf
- A Moon Shaped Pool by Radiohead
- Skeleton Tree by Nick Cave and the Bad Seeds
- 22, A Million by Bon Iver
- Blonde by Frank Ocean
- Howdilly Doodilly by Okilly Dokilly
- Black Terry Cat by Xenia Rubinos

== See also ==
- 2016 in music
- List of 2016 albums
- Category:2016 in music
