= Mobile ticketing =

Process for buying and validating tickets

Mobile ticketing is the process whereby customers order, pay for, obtain, and validate tickets using mobile phones. A mobile ticket contains a verification unique to the holder's phone. Mobile tickets reduce the production and distribution costs associated with paper-based ticketing for operators by transferring the burden to the customer, who is required to contribute the cost of the physical device (smartphone) and internet access to the process. As a result of these prerequisites, and in contrast to paper-based systems, mobile ticketing does not follow the principles of universal design.

Mobile tickets should not be confused with e-tickets, which are simply tickets issued in electronic form, independent of a specific device and in a standard, intelligible format, that can be printed and used in paper form. While a mobile phone is compatible with an e-ticket, mobile ticketing is a distinct system.

There are several methods of implementing a mobile ticketing system, with varying degrees of complexity and transparency depending on the underlying technology. Mobile tickets may lessen the potential for scalping (touting) and fraud.

== History ==
The QR code was created by a subsidiary of the Japanese automotive company Denso in 1994. Philips and Sony developed near-field communication (NFC) in 2002. It is based on radio-frequency identification (RFID) technology and enables short-range communication between electronic devices. Philips published an early paper on NFC in 2004, while the NFC Forum was established in the same year. The GSMA published a whitepaper on M-Ticketing in 2011, having commissioned research to examine the opportunities for network operators in a mobile ticketing market. The research was focused on a specific NFC system based on the UICC, which is owned and controlled by the network operator that issues it, and other technologies such as SMS and barcode were given passing consideration in the report.

The first mobile ticketing deployment for a public transport operator in the UK was for Chiltern Railways in 2007. The first transit agency in the US to deploy mobile ticketing was Boston's MBTA in 2012, while the first system in Australia was Adelaide Metro in 2017.

The New York Yankees partnered with Ticketmaster in 2015 and adopted a new ticketing policy the following year. The option of a print-at-home e-ticket (PDF), which was popular among fans for its convenience, was replaced by a mobile ticketing system. In 2017, the state of Connecticut passed a law that requires venues to make printed, paper tickets available to customers and provide a means to transfer tickets without restrictions.

In 2019, a mobile-only ticketing system developed by Ticketmaster was installed in stadiums across the NFL, based on the Presence platform developed by the company in 2017. The platform is an access control system and marketing tool involving personalized digital tickets and tracking software. The mobile-only version of the system, SafeTix, links the tickets to individual smartphones and was adopted by the vast majority of NFL franchises due to Ticketmaster's position as primary ticket partner of the league. The Buffalo Bills received praise from several organizations, including the NAACP, for not adopting mobile-only ticketing, while fans across the league experienced delays and refusals of entry due to a range of issues with the system.

The All England Club implemented mobile ticketing with an online-only ballot and a ban on ticket transfers for the 2021 Wimbledon Championships, citing COVID-19 protocols developed by the SGSA. The policy was criticized by Age UK for lacking an offline option. A number of Premier League clubs adopted a mobile-only policy for the 2021–22 season, resulting in problems accessing their respective grounds and pushback from supporters' groups. Liverpool F.C. gave its fans the option of a photographic smart card for those without an NFC-enabled phone. ID cards of any form are controversial among football supporters and have been rejected by English fans in the past.

For the 2021 season, the NFL is mandating mobile-only ticketing across the league. The mandate removes the option to issue paper tickets for the few franchises that had not enforced a mobile-only policy, and codifies the requirement for every fan to own a smartphone and grant access to it in order to attend a game. A fifth of Americans do not own a smartphone, either by choice or due to constraint.

== Methods ==
There are several methods of implementing a mobile ticketing system, depending on the technology used. In a system based on text messaging, the user receives their ticket in the form of either an alphanumeric code or a barcode. In a process based on a mobile application, the user carries out a transaction through the app and receives a verification, such as a QR code, specific to their account. Where NFC technology is used, a ticket is issued in the form of a discreet token generated by emulation software on the user's phone itself.

== Privacy and transparency ==
The operation of a mobile ticketing system raises issues of privacy and security. The harvesting of personal data points enables an operator to model, predict, and potentially modify, the behavior of a customer. The implementation of OMNY, a contactless fare payment system for public transport in New York City, has provoked a number of concerns related to surveillance, data security, and transparency in the usage of passengers' information. The system, which uses NFC technology, collects significant amounts of user data, including device identifiers and IP addresses, locations of entry, billing addresses, and payment information.

== See also ==
- Contactless smart card
- Appropriate technology
- Mobile payment
- Multimedia Messaging Service
