= Xenia Rubinos =

American singer-songwriter and multi-instrumentalist

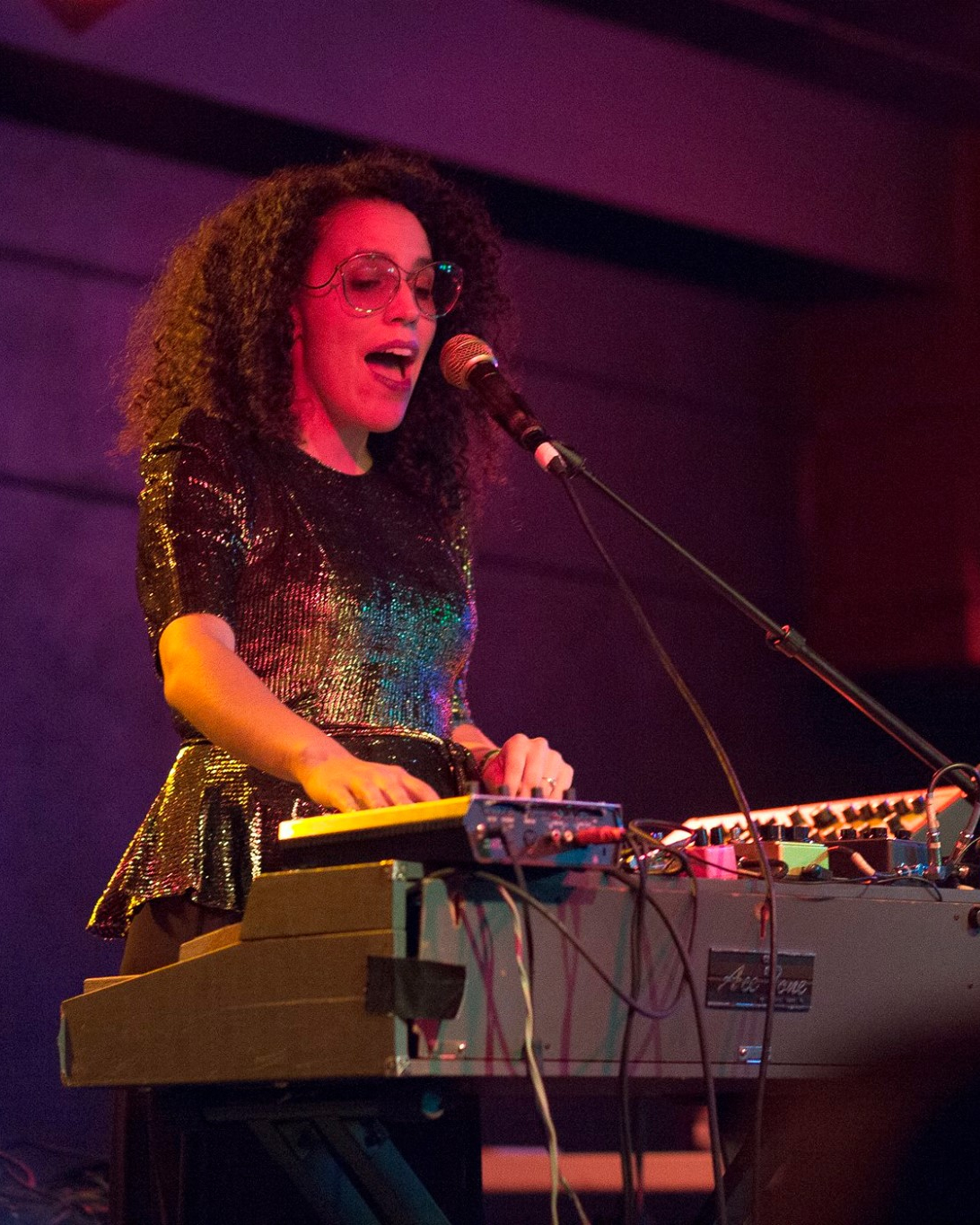
- Xenia Rubinos performing at The Haunt in Ithaca, NY, 2017

Background information
- Born: Xenia Rubinos; July 24, 1985 (age 40)
- Origin: Hartford, Connecticut, United States
- Genres: Funk-rock, R&B, jazz-funk
- Occupations: Musician, songwriter, record producer
- Years active: 2013–present
- Label: ANTI-
- Website: www.xeniarubinos.net

Xenia Rubinos (born July 24, 1985) is an American singer-songwriter and multi-instrumentalist.

== Background and early life ==
Xenia Rubinos was born in Hartford, Connecticut in 1985 to a Puerto Rican mother and a Cuban father. She studied jazz composition at the Berklee College of Music. She spent most of her 20s acting as the primary caregiver for her father as he dealt with a degenerative illness, which inspired her song "Black Stars." She has lived in Brooklyn since 2006.

== Career ==
Her album Black Terry Cat was released to critical acclaim and was named the 11th best album of 2016 by NPR.

== Music ==
Rubinos' early music influences include composers like Prokofiev and Ravel, as her father was a fan of classical music and opera. Salsa, rumba and merengue, including releases by Fania Records, were popular in her house while growing up. Later, she became enthralled with hip-hop, R&B and Miles Davis in particular, which led her to study jazz at the Berklee College of Music.

She is inspired by her Latin American heritage and Santería practices. She is also inspired by the Black Lives Matter movement, and discusses her experiences as a woman of color in her songs, but she sees her music as broader than the category of protest music.

Rubinos' music is not easily categorized, as she crosses many genres in both her lyrics and her sound.

== Discography ==
- 2013 - Magic Trix (self-released)
- 2016 - Black Terry Cat (NuBlack Music Group)
- 2021 - Una Rosa (ANTI-)
