= Late Night Lycett =

British comedy chat show

- Genre: Comedy; Variety show
- Created by: Joe Lycett
- Written by: Joe Lycett; James Kettle
- Directed by: Ben Sutton
- Presented by: Joe Lycett
- Theme music composer: Paul Farrer
- Country of origin: United Kingdom
- Original language: English
- No. of series: 2
- No. of episodes: 12

Production
- Executive producer: Ben Sutton
- Producers: Joe Lycett; James Daniels; Adrian Grant; Charlie Knight; Tom Taylor; Holly Dwight; Emma Ison; Patch Morely
- Camera setup: Multi-camera
- Running time: 60 minutes (inc. adverts)
- Production companies: Rumpus Media; Channel 4 My Options Were Limited

Original release
- Network: Channel 4
- Release: 31 March 2023 – present

Late Night Lycett is a comedy variety show hosted by Joe Lycett on Channel 4 and first broadcast on 31 March 2023. The show is filmed in Lycett's home city of Birmingham and includes brief interviews with celebrity guests, with questions being asked from regular guests appearing in the audience, as well as recurring comedy segments. The show includes the use of surreal humour with one comedy segment showing Lycett talking to Linda Biscuits, a dog who is shown behind one of the cameras operating it while the show is progressing.

== Comedy Segments ==
Filming for the show taking place at "Joe's local corner shop" (Ruprai Food and Wine) with celebrity shop host Ian "H" Watkins (far right).

In series one, one recurring comedy segment included a celebrity minding Lycett's local corner shop in Kings Heath with Lycett crossing over live to a different celebrity in the shop in each episode. Lycett chats to the celebrity guest about how things are going or asks the guests who are with him inside the studio if there is anything they want from the shop.

Lycett's aunts, Pauline and Margaret, are in the audience each week and are announced during the starting period of the show, alongside his "local corner shop" owner, Hardev, Yshee Black and Don One. Another comedy segment includes a celebrity guest spoof of GB News with "Richard Yewtree" (His surname being a reference to Operation Yewtree).

Also in series one, a competition was run in which three audience members tell an embarrassing story in a chance to win Lycett's own car, as well as a running gag in which comedian Katherine Ryan never reaches the studio.

Another segment titled "Finish me off" involved Lycett reading out half of a sentence to a celebrity guest, and the guest is then asked to finish the rest of the sentence. There was also a recurring segment that as part of Lycett's scheme to hire trainees with no previous experience, Linda Biscuits, portrayed by Chilli the labrador, is shown appearing with the production team. Linda is shown operating a camera whilst vision of cats playing in a field comes across the live feed for the show as well as being shown to have urinated on the set beside the stage where Lycett is speaking to guests. Another similar segment to this occurs where a small dog is asked by Lycett where his aunties are located as they were not in the audience at the time.

Featured in each episode in series one is artwork, used to decorate the set, from local Birmingham artists such as Tat Vision, Fokawolf, Hannah Alshemmeri, Dion Kitson, Imbue and others.

In series two, a new recurring sketch involved Lycett asking various people if they had been wondering where Natalie Cassidy is, with the same response being given by each person that "Yeah I have been wondering where Natalie Cassidy is." The show then cuts to Joe Lycett holding his phone and commenting that "Its ringing", and the sketch then goes live to where Natalie Cassidy is located which is often in a mundane location such as seeing Natalie at home in bed with a face mask on or in the bath. In five of the six episodes in series 2, four people are asked this question, and then in the final episode there were thirteen people asked this question with Lycett commenting after the fifth person that, "We are now basically off the script that I've not read before by the way I don't know what's happening." Other surprises in episode 6 of series 2 included Maryam Moshiri appearing as a guest without Lycett being aware that Moshiri was appearing and Lycett being given a photo that had his head photoshopped onto the body of a different second male who was completely naked with a surprised Lycett commenting, "It's a photo of me with me cock out."

Another recurring segment in series two included "Hunderstudies", where Lycett comments on an event that he has been invited to attend, and then he sends someone else out to attend who then appears on air live from the show. The segment included David Potts appearing live from the opening of a public toilet in Pangbourne, Tom Read Wilson appearing at a Blue concert in Gateshead, and Anita Rani appearing live from Hardev's shop in King's Heath.

== Production ==
The show is filmed live at The Bond in Digbeth and is produced by Channel 4, Rumpus Media and My Options Were Limited, Joe Lycett's production company.

== Episodes ==
=== Series 1 (2023) ===
Recurring segments in this series included a live cross over to a celebrity guest minding Lycett's local corner shop, studio audience members speaking about embarrassing stories, Linda Biscuits, the dog, who was a member of the production staff, and the segment titled "Finish me Off" where Lycett reads out half a sentence to guests and the guest is then asked to finish the rest of the sentence.

No.	Title	Directed by	Written by	Original release date
1	"Episode 1"	Ben Sutton	Joe Lycett	31 March 2023
Guests include Alison Hammond, Alan Carr, Joanna Lumley and Katherine Ryan. Claire Sweeney minds the shop. Presenting alongside Richard Yewtree is Alan Carr. Ryan is not interviewed as the canal boat where the guests wait drifts away.
2	"Episode 2"	Ben Sutton	Joe Lycett	7 April 2023
Guests include Daisy May Cooper, Rylan Clark, David Harewood, Greg James and Katherine Ryan. Natalie Cassidy minds the shop. Presenting alongside Richard Yewtree is Greg James. The previous week's incident with Ryan is revealed to be the start of a running gag as she again fails to make it off the boat.
3	"Episode 3"	Ben Sutton	Joe Lycett	14 April 2023
Guests include Gemma Collins, Joan Collins, Joel Dommett, Munroe Bergdorf and Katherine Ryan. Anthea Turner minds the shop. Presenting alongside Richard Yewtree is Joel Dommett. Ryan makes it off the boat but fails to enter the studio as she is supposedly arrested.
4	"Episode 4"	Ben Sutton	Joe Lycett	21 April 2023
Guests include Jonathan Ross, Rob Delaney, Judi Love and Katherine Ryan. Ian "H" Watkins minds the shop. Presenting alongside Richard Yewtree is Rob Delaney. Ryan makes it off the boat but fails to enter the studio as she gets pushed by a 'fan' into the canal, she floats away.
5	"Episode 5 - Finale"	Ben Sutton	Joe Lycett	28 April 2023
Guests include Richard E. Grant, Rosie Jones and Katherine Ryan. Paul Chuckle minds the shop. Ryan reaches the studio and is interviewed with questions from episode one and also participates in a sketch with Richard Yewtree. Richard Yewtree is fired in the middle of his own show and replaced by Kathy Yewtree (Ryan).
6	"Episode 6 - Christmas Special"	Ben Sutton	Joe Lycett	21 December 2023
Guests included Aisling Bea, Mel B, Guz Khan, Self Esteem and Shaun Ryder. Six guests from the studio audience formed three sets of couples and were asked to kiss while Aisling and Mel B were asked to guess which one of the three couples was also a couple in real life.

=== Series 2 (2024) ===
Recurring segments in this series included "Hunderstudies", "Where in the world is Natalie Cassidy?" and "Something Teeny with Claire Sweeney".

No.	Title	Directed by	Written by	Original release date
1	"Episode 1"	Ben McElligott	Joe Lycett	12 April 2024
Guests in episode one included Danny Dyer, Kate Garraway and Big Zuu. David Potts presented "Hunderstudies", coming live from the opening of a public toilet in Pangbourne.
2	"Episode 2"	Ben McElligott	Joe Lycett	19 April 2024
Guests included Alesha Dixon, Paddy McGuinness and Alexander Armstrong. Kevin McCloud was featured in a sketch where he interrupts Joe by discussing plans for a new house inside the studio. Sinitta presented "Hunderstudies".
3	"Episode 3"	Ben McElligott	Joe Lycett	26 April 2024
Guests included Lorraine Kelly, Bruno Tonioli and Kiell Smith-Bynoe. Tom Read Wilson presented "Hunderstudies", coming live from a Blue concert in Gateshead.
4	"Episode 4"	Ben McElligott	Joe Lycett	3 May 2024
Guests included Sue Perkins, Ross Kemp, Judi Love and Jordan Gray. Joe Swash presented the Hunderstudies segment, and he was introduced as opening a new restaurant. It was then revealed that he was at the studio of a new show that was being presented by Joe's two aunties, Margaret and Pauline.
5	"Episode 5"	Ben McElligott	Joe Lycett	10 May 2024
Guests included Elizabeth Hurley, Jameela Jamil, Chris Packham and Jordan Gray.
6	"Episode 6 - Finale"	Ben McElligott	Joe Lycett	17 May 2024
Guests included Carol Vorderman, Jack Rooke, Johnny Vegas, Sophie Willan and Maryam Moshiri. Anita Rani presented Hunderstudies from Hardev's shop in King's Heath. Vorderman and Moshiri presenting The World Tonight with Maryam Moshiri with Richard Yeutree.

== Reception ==
Opinions about Late Night Lycett were generally positive; The Guardian described it as reinvigorating the chat show by being "newer, riskier, and sillier" than other popular shows of 2023. However, some viewers saw it as a "poor spin off" of TFI Friday.

In 2024 the show received a BAFTA for "Entertainment Performance". Lycett received the award dressed as Queen Elizabeth I, after losing a bet against his two aunties.

Late Night Lycett has 5.5 stars out of 10 on IMDb.

== Gallery ==
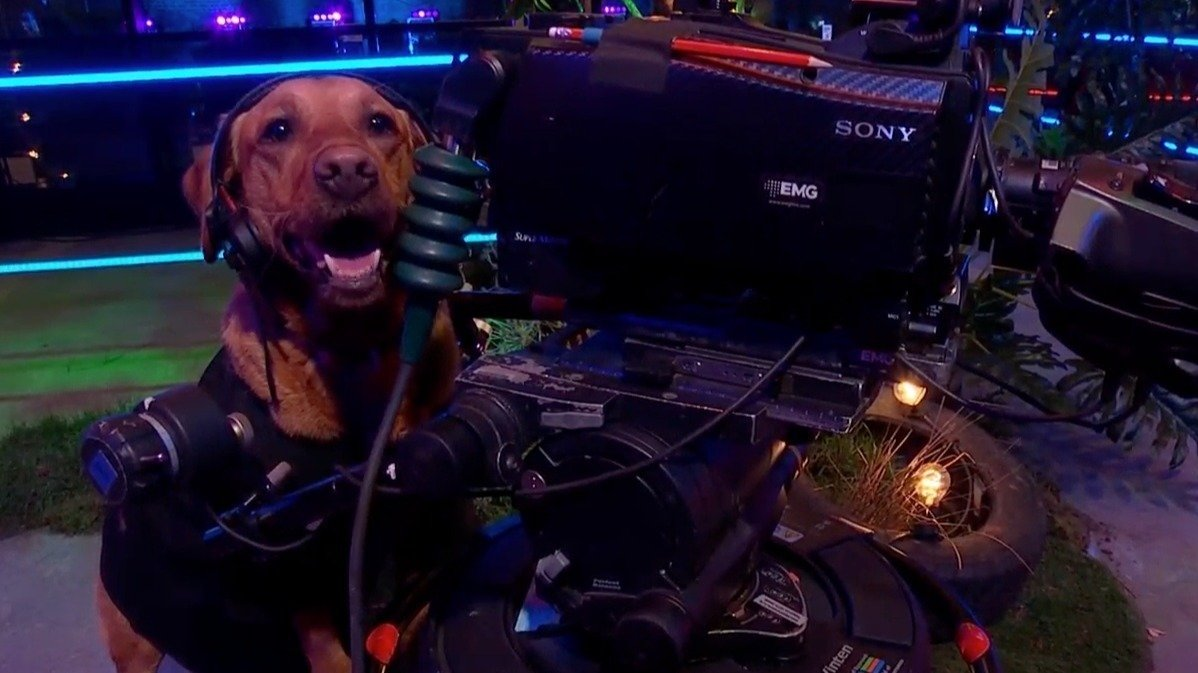
Linda Biscuits, or Chilli, on Late Night Lycett. In this episode from series one Linda Biscuits was shown operating one of the cameras whilst vision of cats playing in a field was shown.

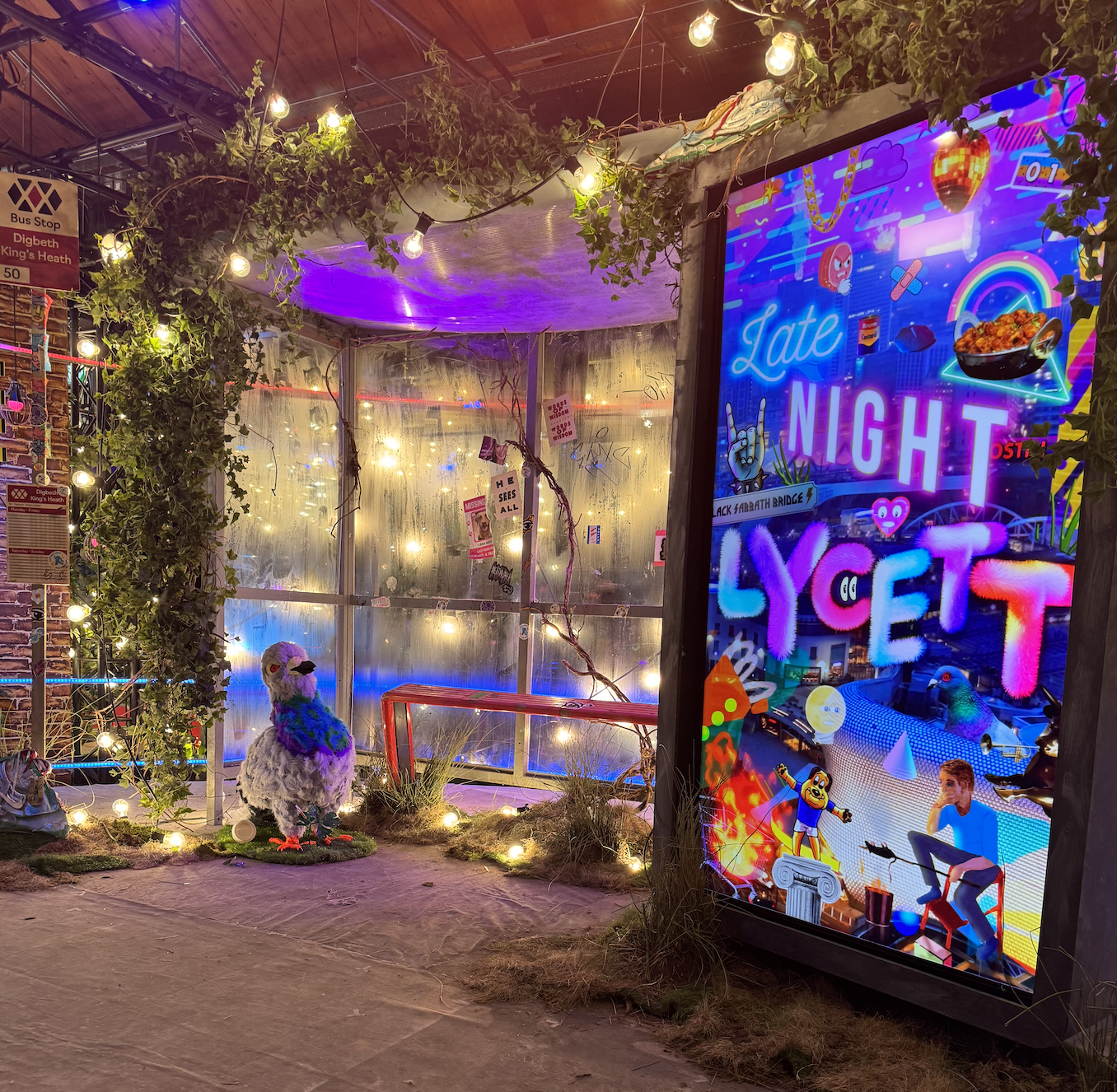
Part of the Late Night Lycett set at The Bond in Digbeth, Birmingham.
