= Tez Ilyas =

British Pakistani comedian (born 1983)

- تہذ الیاس
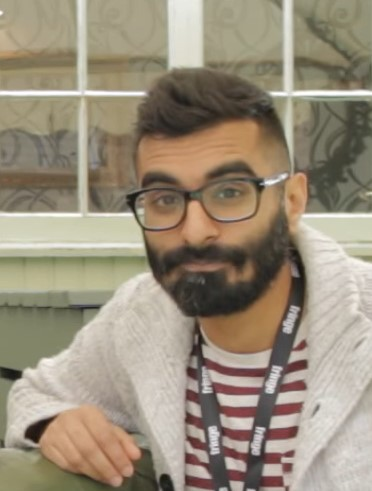
- Ilyas in 2015
- Born: Mohammed Tehzeeb Ilyas; 8 April 1983 (age 43); Blackburn, Lancashire, England
- Education: Lancaster University (BSc, MSc)
- Spouse: Shy Ilyas (m. 2022)

Comedy career
- Years active: 2010–present
- Medium: Stand-up
- Genres: Observational humour, Satire
- Subjects: Islamic humour, Islamophobia, Islam in the United Kingdom, Social integration
- Website: www.tezilyas.com

Mohammed Tehzeeb Ilyas (Punjabi: محمد تہذیب الیاس; born 8 April 1983), popularly known as "Tez" Ilyas, is a British stand-up comedian. He is best known for starring in the BBC Three comedy, Man Like Mobeen and presenting the satirical comedy programme, The Tez O'Clock Show on Channel 4.

== Early life ==
Ilyas was born on 8 April 1983 to a Pakistani Punjabi Muslim family in Blackburn, Lancashire, England. His family originates from Jhelum in Pakistan. His parents divorced when he was a child.

He started his career as a civil servant after studying biochemistry at Lancaster University where he also completed a master's degree. He then got a graduate job in the civil service in London.

== Career ==
Ilyas fell into comedy after googling online writing courses and completing a week-long open mic workshop before becoming a comedian in 2010.

In June 2015, Ilyas made a short film, The Fast and the Fool as part of the British Muslim Comedy series- five short films by Muslim comedians commissioned by the BBC to be released on BBC iPlayer. Ilyas goes through the day in the life of a fasting Muslim and shows how he copes with the stresses and strains of an ordinary day in the office during Ramadan.

In July 2015, Ilyas performed at an Eid Special Comedy Night at The Comedy Store in London. In December of the same year, he performed at BBC Asian Network's special comedy night, celebrating 50 years of Asian programmes on the BBC with a special comedy night in Birmingham.

Ilyas has performed at the Edinburgh Festival Fringe four times. In 2011, he was in a three-hander with Gary Tro and Kate Lucas called Gags Songs and Bombs. In 2013, he was on the comedy reserve in the Pleasance Dome. In 2014, he performed for a week.

Ilyas' debut show the TEZ Talks resembles TED Talks, the popular conference lecture series. Ilyas' show is inspired by his life as a British Muslim, and deals with numerous misconceptions about Islam. His show is staged as an introductory seminar on becoming a convert to Islam with the audience playing the part of potential recruits. This enables Ilyas to explain the intricacies of his belief system while dealing with misconceptions arising from prejudice. He gives a series of mock-inspirational speeches on integrating into British society, and explains concepts like jihad and Ramadan with 'unpatronisingly good humour', explores "British values" and debunks Islamophobic abuse. In August 2015, Ilyas performed the show at the Pleasance Courtyard at the Edinburgh Festival Fringe. In February 2016, he performed the show at London's Soho Theatre.

A BBC Radio 4 series based on the Tez Talks was commissioned and has run for three series. Ilyas was awarded a place in the BBC's Writers Academy. He has written and filmed his scripted comedy shorts for Sky. He has appeared on both The Now Show and the Children in Need Comedy Gala for BBC Radio 4, and appeared on both Virtually Famous on E4 and Live From the BBC on BBC Three.

He has appeared as the recurring character 'Eight' on the BBC Three comedy series, Man Like Mobeen, alongside comedian and actor Guz Khan.

In December 2018, Ilyas featured in the comedy short, Bounty, a 'Comedy Blap' by Channel 4, which was set in his hometown of Blackburn.

In January 2019, it was announced that Ilyas would host a new comedy programme on Channel 4, The Tez O'Clock Show, broadcast from dock10 studios in Manchester. Three 60-minute episodes of the show were aired on the channel from 25 July 2019, featuring a combination of comedians, satirical sketches and celebrity guests.

In June 2020, he released a stand-up comedy special, Teztify, on YouTube. The show was filmed live at the Soutbank Centre in London in May 2018 as part of a UK tour.

In April 2021, Ilyas released his debut book, The Secret Diary of a British Muslim aged 13 3/4, published by Sphere Books. In 2024 he appeared on SAS: Who Dares Wins.

== Politics ==
In November 2019, Ilyas was chosen to take over the Instagram of Jeremy Corbyn during the Labour Party leaders' debate with Prime Minister Boris Johnson.

In January 2020, Ilyas spoke at a 'No War on Iran' demonstration in Trafalgar Square, London organised by Stop the War Coalition and the Campaign for Nuclear Disarmament following the assassination of Iranian General Qassem Soleimani and the subsequent Iranian missile attack on US bases in Iraq.

== Awards and nominations ==
In 2011, Ilyas reached the final of the BBC Radio New Comedy Awards. In 2013, Ilyas was a finalist for Leicester Mercury New Comedian of the Year and won The Pleasance showcase, The Comedy Reserve.

== Personal life ==
Ilyas is a Muslim and is based in Clapham, London. He is a Blackburn Rovers fan.

Ilyas cites television shows such as South Park, The Thick of It and Blackadder, but most importantly the dry humour of the people of his home town, Blackburn, and his father, as his biggest inspiration.

In July 2022, Ilyas announced on social media that he had married, sharing a photo of himself and his wife Shy wearing their wedding rings.

== See also ==
- Islamic humour
- British Pakistani
- List of British Pakistanis
