= Rosie Jones: Am I a R*tard? =

2023 Channel 4 documentary

- Genre: Documentary
- Directed by: Tom Levinge
- Starring: Rosie Jones
- Country of origin: United Kingdom
- Original language: English

Production
- Running time: 48 minutes

Original release
- Network: Channel 4
- Release: 20 July 2023

Rosie Jones: Am I a R*tard? [sic] is a 2023 British documentary by the comedian Rosie Jones about online hate speech against disabled people. She reads messages written about her, which use slurs such as retard, and explores the emotional effect of harassment, the inaction by social media companies and the motivations behind people who send these messages.

The programme, which aired on Channel 4, is targeted at non-disabled people with low awareness of ableism. Jones has cerebral palsy (CP) and found it emotionally difficult to make. She began therapy during the production and began to understand how she used humour as a coping mechanism.

The documentary received widespread criticism for its title, with three disabled contributors withdrawing over it. Reviewers praised the documentary's aim to raise awareness. However, they commented that only one disabled person other than Jones appears and that the scenes involving Twitter and an interview with an internet troll did not have the desired impact.

== Background ==
Rosie Jones is a British comedian with ataxic cerebral palsy. The documentary is based on her experiences of online hate speech she has received through her television work and public appearances. It was announced in March 2022 alongside a second series of Trip Hazard: My Great British Adventure and an upcoming cooking programme Dine Hard, two of Jones' other projects. It was initially described as a documentary about abuse on social media and societal attitudes towards disability. A BAFTA screening took place in June 2023 and the documentary premiered on 20 July.

Jones said that the documentary's target audience was non-disabled people who are unaware of ableism and use offensive language. She believed that most people could define other forms of prejudice, such as racism and sexism, but not ableism.

It was directed by Tom Levinge. Jones said the filming made her realise that she used jokes to "break the tension" and avoid serious realities. Levinge told her not to respond with humour when shown the harassing social media messages about her. Jones described the documentary as the most difficult piece of media to make in her career, and said she was in therapy because of the subject matter. It made her confront her anger at experiencing discrimination and facts that she had "perhaps kept in a drawer". Therapy allowed her to say: "sometimes I am a victim".

=== Title ===
Before the documentary's release, the title was widely discussed due to its use of the ableist slur retard. Jones said the title was her idea, to highlight the unacceptability of the slur, which is regularly shouted at her on the street and used in social media harassment against her. Channel 4 said that the term's use was "carefully considered" by the editorial team. Jones said the title is "not used to shock", but is designed to "take control" of the word. The disability consultant Ally Castle said that "provoking and challenging" were central to Channel 4's aims to "push boundaries and prompt conversation". Castle said it was not clickbait but "relevant to the subject, story and objective of the film".

Three contributors—all disabled models—withdrew consent to be featured after filming when they learned of the title. The Daily Mirror disability rights columnist Rachel Charlton-Dailey believed that the title could lead people "who already use that word so freely" to "see this as a license to use it again". The presenter Mik Scarlet thought the documentary "will end up being devalued by its title", comparing it to the unintended consequences of Blue Peter's coverage of Joey Deacon. Anita Singh of The Daily Telegraph said that the controversy will have had the effect desired by Channel 4 executives: increasing interest in the programme.

James Taylor, a staff member for the charity Scope, commented that Jones had a right to address the topic, as the word has been used against her, but that the arguments it had created within disabled communities were unfortunate. In reaction to criticism that Jones should not use the word retard as it refers to people with learning disabilities, she said: "the abusers do not care I have CP and I'm not intellectually disabled".

== Synopsis ==
Rosie Jones opens by explaining why the documentary title uses "the R-word" and the harm it causes. She wears headphones when out in public to avoid hearing the harassment that is shouted at her. The documentary covers Jones' early television appearances and the abusive social media posts made in response, which nearly made her quit comedy.

Jones has hired a company, Arwen, to filter out abusive messages she receives. She visits the company to see some of the blocked messages. With an employee, she discusses hate speech and the emotional effect of the comments. Jones questions why this content is allowed on Twitter despite its rules, even after reporting one message. At Twitter's headquarters, Jones delivers a cookie with "Am I retarded?" written in icing. The tweet is then deleted. A social media expert tells Jones that the initial response to her report was automated.

Jones visits the parents of a child born with a rare genetic disorder. They received cruel responses, such as suggestions that they should kill their daughter, when trying to crowdfund money for her medical treatment. Their child died at the age of four.

Jones tries to contact people who have sent her harassing messages to have a discussion. She discusses with Nikki Fox, a disabled broadcaster, about the negative comments they receive. Matthew Williams, author of The Science of Hate, gives Jones insight into why people write such comments. Jones speaks to a man who was imprisoned for internet harassment about what motivated him and the issues in his personal life at the time.

== Reception ==
Anita Singh gave the documentary three out of five stars for The Daily Telegraph, finding it to succeed in raising awareness of ableist hatred. Singh critiqued that it met "the obstacles that always defeat programmes of this kind": unresponsiveness by the companies and individuals involved in the abuse.

The Independent's Lucy Webster praised the "desperately needed" programme as an "effective" introduction to ableism and Jones' "tough decision" to openly show her emotional reaction to receiving abuse. However, Webster thought the documentary suffered from the minimal presence of disabled people other than the host and absence of commentary on the wider context of exclusion of disabled people.

In The Arts Desk, Saskia Baron gave a negative review that said it was "thin and repetitive", lacking exploration of why people are abusive towards the disabled. Baron called it a "wasted opportunity" as there is "a long history of changing the words used to describe intellectually disabled people" that leads to new slurs. Baron found Jones' appearance at Twitter's headquarters to be a "poorly executed stunt". The Observer's Barbara Ellen, giving the programme three stars, did not find the review with a former internet troll "particularly revelatory".

Writing in i, Barbara Charlton-Dailey gave the programme two stars. Charlton-Dailey believed more disabled contributors were needed and criticised Jones' comments that racism or homophobia is treated more seriously than ableism. She said the documentary would not change the minds of people who use the word retard.
