= Gill Isles =

British television producer

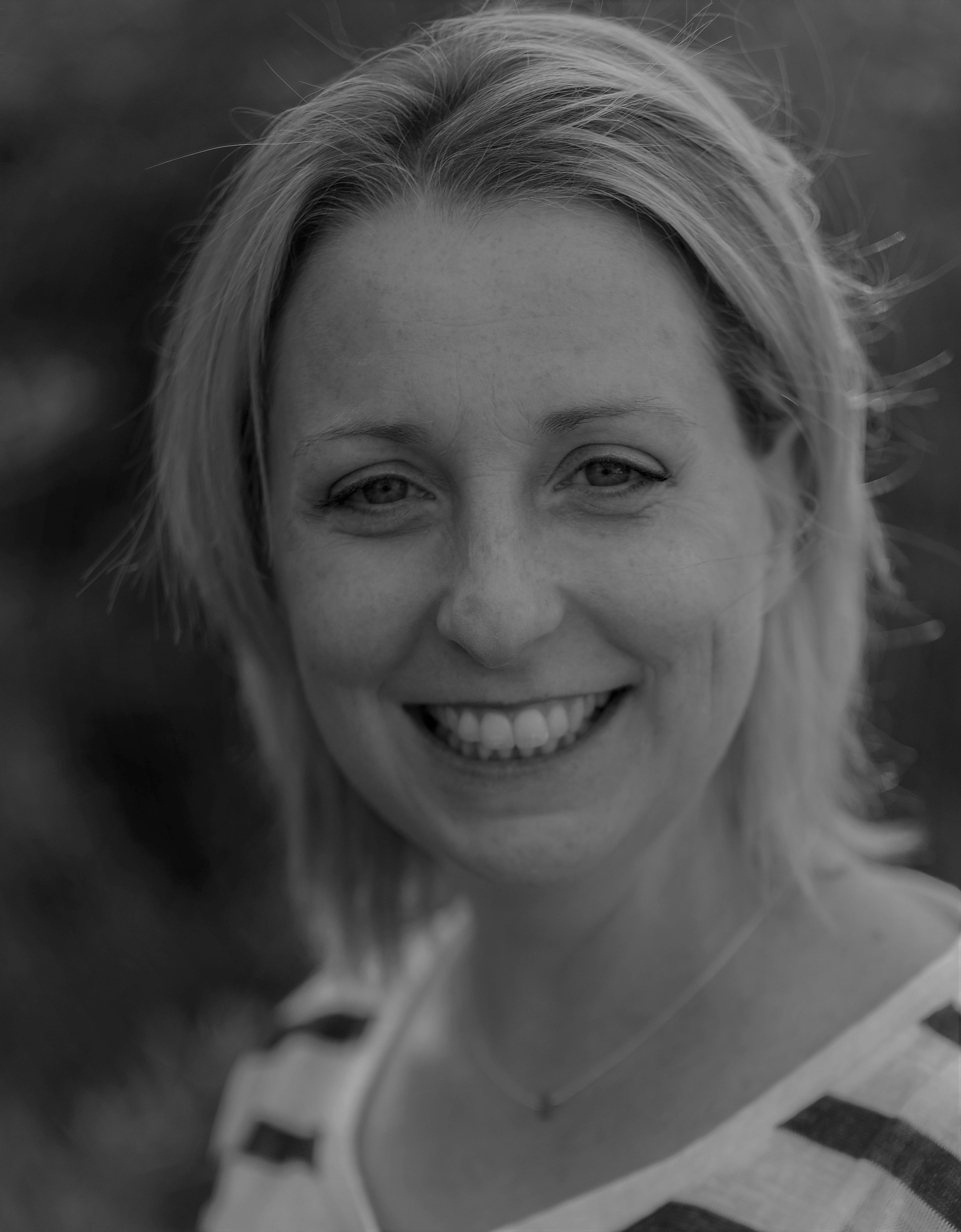
- Born: Castleford
- Occupation: TV comedy producer
- Years active: 1994–present
- Notable work: Peter Kay's Car Share, Detectorists, Ideal, Man Like Mobeen
- Awards: BAFTA Best Scripted Comedy (2016) NTA Best Comedy Programme (2016 & 2018) Rose d'Or Best Comedy (2018)

Gill Isles is a BAFTA winning TV comedy producer.

== Life and career ==
Gill Isles is originally from Castleford, Yorkshire and attended NEW College, Pontefract. Gill later graduated from the BA Media Production course at Bournemouth University and began her career working at BBC Radio Leeds as a broadcast assistant. After moving to London for a role as researcher at Radio 1's Newsbeat, Isles moved into TV comedy working as an assistant producer on shows including The British Comedy Awards, The 11 O'Clock Show, BBC3's Cyderdelic and The State We're In as well as working with the Ronnie Barker on his BBC1 BAFTA tribute night.

Isles moved to Manchester in 2005 to take up the role of talent producer for BBC Comedy North, the corporation's comedy unit based in Manchester, and in 2007 left to head up the northern arm of Steve Coogan's company Baby Cow. Whilst at Baby Cow, Isles produced shows including Gavin and Stacey Christmas Special, four series of the award-winning Ideal starring Johnny Vegas, the second series of the comedy drama Starlings for Sky and BBC2 sitcom Hebburn.

In 2015 Isles became a freelance comedy producer and has subsequently won awards whilst working with comedy talent in the UK including Craig Cash, Mackenzie Crook and most notably Peter Kay, producing both series of the multi-award-winning Peter Kay's Car Share for Goodnight Vienna Productions. The series, first broadcast in April 2015, won awards including two National Television Awards and the BAFTA for Best Scripted Comedy in 2016. More recently Isles produced series 3 of Detectorists which won the Rose d'Or for Best Comedy Series in 2018 and is working with comedian Guz Khan on his series Man Like Mobeen.
