= Sick Note (TV series) =

- Genre: Dark comedy
- Created by: Nat Saunders; James Serafinowicz
- Directed by: Matt Lipsey
- Starring: Rupert Grint; Nick Frost; Don Johnson; Pippa Bennett-Warner; Lindsay Lohan
- Theme music composer: Carly Paradis
- Composer: Carly Paradis
- Country of origin: United Kingdom
- Original language: English
- No. of series: 2
- No. of episodes: 14

Production
- Executive producer: Jo Sargent
- Producer: Sarah Fraser
- Running time: 44 minutes (episode 1); 22–24 minutes (episodes 2–14)
- Production company: King Bert Productions

Original release
- Network: Sky One
- Release: 7 November 2017 – 16 August 2018

Sick Note is a British black comedy television series starring Rupert Grint and Nick Frost. It was created and written by Nat Saunders and James Serafinowicz and directed by Matt Lipsey. It first aired on 7 November 2017 on Sky One. In April 2017, it was reported that a second series had been commissioned before the first had aired. It became available for streaming on Netflix worldwide from November 2018 to 2023.

In April 2021, Saunders stated the series was "neither recommissioned or cancelled, just in TV show limbo" when asked on Twitter about its status, adding that a return seemed unlikely. Serafinowicz had previously shared similar thoughts and revealed they "wrote the first 2 episodes of season 3 but nothing ever happened."

== Plot ==
When insurance agent Daniel Glass (Rupert Grint) is misdiagnosed with terminal oesophageal cancer due to his incompetent doctor (Nick Frost), he begins to notice that everyone around him treats him better and he decides not to tell. This leads to more lies and secrets which need to be covered up. Daniel and the doctor become allies as each have something to gain by maintaining the façade; however, they attract the attention of a local policeman who believes Daniel may have been involved in a murder case. As more people become involved the web of lies begins to grow and eventually serious crimes are committed.

== Cast ==
=== Series 1 ===
- Rupert Grint as Daniel Glass
- Nick Frost as Dr. Iain Glennis
- Don Johnson as Kenny West
- Pippa Bennett-Warner as Becca Palmerstone
- Marama Corlett as Linda
- Tolu Ogunmefun as Ash Matthews
- Lolly Adefope as Lisa
- Belinda Stewart-Wilson as Annette Glennis
- Karl Theobald as Michael
- Matilda Thorpe as Claire Glass
- Camilla Beeput as Vanessa Matthews
- Miles Richardson as Dr. Sampson
- David Cann as Gordon Glass
- Daniel Rigby as Officer Hayward

=== Series 2 ===
- Lindsay Lohan as Katerina West
- Alison King as Superintendent Henchy
- Dustin Demri-Burns as Will_5000

== Episodes ==
Series	Episodes	Originally released	
Series	Episodes	First released	Last released
1	6	7 November 2017	12 December 2017
2	8	26 July 2018	16 August 2018

=== Series 1 (2017) ===
No. overall	No. in series	Title	Directed by	Written by	Original release date
1	1	"Queen of Hearts"	Matt Lipsey	Nat Saunders & James Serafinowicz	7 November 2017
When Daniel Glass is misdiagnosed with terminal oesophageal cancer by oncologist Dr Iain Glennis, he begins to notice how everyone around him treats him better. Suddenly, he has a big decision to make: come clean and go back to his old rubbish life or pretend to be ill. His ex-girlfriend, Becca, takes him back after dumping him. His best friend Ash, who was having an affair with Becca, finds out that Daniel does not have cancer. Daniel discovers their affair and Ash accidentally falls off a ledge of Becca and Daniel's flat and appears to have been killed.
2	2	"Playing Ball"	Matt Lipsey	Nat Saunders & James Serafinowicz	14 November 2017
Daniel has to dispose of Ash's body, and the only person he can turn to is bumbling Dr Glennis. They decide to make it look like Ash has been struck by a vehicle in a hit-and-run. Glennis puts the body in his car and dumps it at the side of a road. When Ash's body is found, it is discovered that he is alive, and is taken to hospital. Daniel is horrified that Ash is alive.
3	3	"Janina Kolkiewicz"	Matt Lipsey	Nat Saunders & James Serafinowicz	21 November 2017
Daniel, Ash, Dr Glennis, as well as Ash's wife, son and mother arrive at the hospital — where Ash is in a coma. Dr Glennis has accidentally swapped phones with Ash and needs to swap them back. Daniel's employer, WeCover insurance, decides to use his cancer in a marketing campaign.
4	4	"The Golden Grain"	Matt Lipsey	Nat Saunders & James Serafinowicz	28 November 2017
Daniel starts faking side effects and undergoes fake chemo. Thanks to the idiocy of Dr Glennis, he receives actual chemotherapy and gets legitimately ill. Officer Hayward continues his investigation.
5	5	"Airplane Mode"	Matt Lipsey	Nat Saunders & James Serafinowicz	5 December 2017
Ash wakes up from his coma but suffers from locked-in syndrome.
6	6	"Chicken Soup"	Matt Lipsey	Nat Saunders & James Serafinowicz	12 December 2017
Ash has died and at his funeral Daniel sees a mysterious figure that continues to stalk him. Daniel suspects Dr. Glennis of finishing Ash off.

=== Series 2 (2018) ===
No. overall	No. in series	Title	Directed by	Written by	Original release date
7	1	"Frantisek Kotzwara"	Matt Lipsey	Nat Saunders & James Serafinowicz	26 July 2018
After unexpectedly arriving from America, Daniel's online gaming friend, Will_5000, creates havoc. Daniel asks Dr. Glennis to steal some security footage.
8	2	"New Balls"	Matt Lipsey	Nat Saunders & James Serafinowicz	26 July 2018
Kenny's daughter shakes things up at We Cover. Daniel decides to turn over a new leaf and asks Dr. Glennis to help him "recover" more quickly.
9	3	"Stay Hydrated"	Matt Lipsey	Nat Saunders & James Serafinowicz	2 August 2018
To meet Will's demands, Daniel and Dr. Glennis explore a shady deal. Vanessa continues trying to access Ash's phone. Becca makes a move on Will.
10	4	"Braking Bad"	Matt Lipsey	Nat Saunders & James Serafinowicz	2 August 2018
With things looking hopeless, Daniel and Dr. Glennis decide to leave the country. Becca makes an unexpected discovery. Vanessa confronts Becca.
11	5	"Constable Polly"	Matt Lipsey	Nat Saunders & James Serafinowicz	9 August 2018
Ordered to take a few days off work, Officer Hayward continues his investigation, focusing on the information he's gathered on Daniel and Dr. Glennis.
12	6	"My Two Dads"	Matt Lipsey	Nat Saunders & James Serafinowicz	9 August 2018
When Daniel tries to retrieve his belongings from the police, he runs into both Officer Hayward and Katerina — and learns some news about Will.
13	7	"The Loneliness of the Middle Distance Runner"	Matt Lipsey	Nat Saunders & James Serafinowicz	16 August 2018
Officer Hayward suspects Dr. Glennis's wife of criminal activity. Katerina asks Daniel to keep his "recovery" quiet. Vanessa learns the truth.
14	8	"Operation Thunderbolt"	Matt Lipsey	Nat Saunders & James Serafinowicz	16 August 2018
With Dr. Glennis in danger, Daniel tries to retrieve the drug money from his house. While Hayward goes rogue, the police execute Operation Thunderbolt.

== Home media ==
The first season was released on DVD on 21 October 2019. The second season was released on 17 February 2020.

== Reception ==
Sick Note received mixed reviews from critics. On review aggregator Rotten Tomatoes, the first season has a 50% approval rating based on 6 reviews. Rupert Hawksley of The Daily Telegraph stated the premise "is not a bad one at all" but ultimately finds that the "cast is wasted" due to the writing, claiming that the "jokes landed with all the grace of an injured pheasant." Brad Newsome of the Sydney Morning Herald described the series by saying, "Rupert Grint, Nick Frost and Don Johnson are all very naughty boys in this dark but agreeably untaxing British comedy series." Barbara Ellen of The Guardian considered the "performances are great and there are plenty of laughs in the escalating twists of surrealist failure." In an article by James Rampton for The Independent, it is characterized as "dark, but silly as well. It's Breaking Bad meets Fawlty Towers," and "cleverly fuses light and shade."

In a review for Paste Magazine, LaToya Ferguson also writes that Sick Note has a "pretty solid premise" but the series is "wildly uneven," it "has a singular narrative and aesthetic vision, and it never once veers from that, no matter what", continuing that the addition of Lohan to the second season "doesn't read as an attempt to course-correct, it probably should've been," although her character "meshes much better with the story as a whole. Especially, as she almost, sort of, but not quite solves the show's woman problem."

=== Accolades ===
Year	Award	Category	Result
2018	British Screenwriters’ Awards	Best Comedy Writing on Television	Nominated
