= Man Like Mobeen =

BBC comedy series

- Genre: Comedy-drama
- Created by: Guz Khan; Andy Milligan
- Directed by: Ollie Parsons (series 1–3); Akaash Meeda (series 4); David Sant (series 5)
- Starring: Guz Khan; Tolu Ogunmefun; Tez Ilyas; Duaa Karim
- Country of origin: United Kingdom
- Original language: English
- No. of series: 5
- No. of episodes: 23

Production
- Producers: Gill Isles (series 1–3); Lynn Roberts (series 4); David Simpson (series 5)
- Production companies: Tiger Aspect Productions; Banijay Entertainment; Dice Roll Productions

Original release
- Network: BBC Three; BBC iPlayer
- Release: 17 December 2017 – 1 May 2025

Man Like Mobeen is a British comedy-drama television series created by Guz Khan and Andy Milligan, which premiered on BBC Three on 17 December 2017. It stars Khan as Mobeen, a former drug dealer living in the Small Heath area of Birmingham, and follows his efforts to live a good life as a Muslim while raising his younger sister, Aqsa in the absence of their parents. The series has been praised for its relatable characters and depictions of working-class West Midlands life and British Pakistani-Muslim culture.

== Cast ==
=== Main ===
- Guz Khan as Mobeen Deen, reformed former drug dealer raising his younger sister and trying to improve his community. Yousef Naseer appears as young Mobeen.
- Tolu Ogunmefun as Nate, Mobeen's best friend and advocate. Timi Akinyosade appears as young Nate.
- Tez Ilyas (series 1–3) as Arslan "Eight" Mughal, a close friend of Mobeen and Nate, and part of the chosen family to Aqsa. Zain Rahman appears as young Eight.
- Dúaa Karim as Aqsa, Mobeen's younger sister, who is often exasperated with him but loves and looks up to him.

=== Recurring ===
- Mark Silcox as Mohammed "Uncle Shady" Shah Shaheed, a sadistic and outspoken figure in the local community, but close ally of Mobeen and his friends.
- Perry Fitzpatrick as Barney Harper, a police officer who comes into frequent contact with Mobeen.
- Salman Akhtar (series 1, 4–5) as Sajid, a former classmate of Mobeen.
- Asheq Akhtar (series 1 and 3) as Uncle Ahmed.
- David Avery (series 2–3) as Cal, a childhood friend of Mobeen.
- Art Malik (series 3–5) as Uncle Khan, a drug kingpin.
- Jaykae (series 2) as Azaar, a local gangster.
- Aimee-Ffion Edwards (series 2) as Miss Aitken, Aqsa's English teacher.
- Korkmaz Arslan (series 2 and 5) as Emre, a Turkish barber.
- Nikesh Patel (series 3 and 5) as Naveed and Iqbal, nephews of Uncle Khan.
- Kane Brown (series 3) as the Hood Whisperer.
- Janice Connolly (series 4) as Governor Burn.
- Yousef Kerkour (series 4) as Megalodon.
- Specs Gonzalez (series 4) as Chippy, Sajid's cousin and an accomplice to Megalodon.
- Al Roberts (series 4) as Memory Stick.
- Hussina Raja (series 4–5) as Nida.
- David Pearse (series 5) as Jerry, an Irish gangster.

== Production ==
While working as a humanities teacher in a secondary school in Coventry, Guz Khan began making YouTube videos in character as Mobeen, an opinionated care worker who is raising his sister Aqsa. One video reacted to Fox News's suggestion that Birmingham was a no-go area for non-Muslims while another went viral after calling for a boycott of Jurassic World due to its use of the word "Pachy" to refer to the dinosaur, Pachycephalosaurus, a herbivore from the Cretaceous period found in current day Baluchistan, as it sounds like the racial slur for people of Pakistani descent, "Paki". Steve Coogan's production company Baby Cow picked up on Khan's YouTube videos and made a pilot for BBC Three's new talent show, Comedy Feeds. Khan has described the pilot as "very generic, super-sitcomy" and stated that he wanted to make "something more substantial" with Man Like Mobeen. The four-part first series, produced by Cave Bear and Tiger Aspect Productions, was announced by BBC Three controller Damian Kavanagh at the 2017 Edinburgh Festival and was released on iPlayer in December of the same year.

The show was picked up for a second series of four episodes in September 2018. During filming for the second series' first episode, which deals with knife crime, Khan and other members of the production called an ambulance after seeing a young boy attacked and threatened with a knife. Khan has stated that while waiting for the ambulance he felt that "nothing was more real than the very subject we were filming and talking about". In response to the success of the programme with younger audiences, the BBC announced in March 2019 that a third series of Man Like Mobeen had been commissioned, which aired in 2020. In September 2020, a fourth series was confirmed, which started airing in June 2023. In February 2024, the fifth and final series was announced, which aired on 1 May 2025.

Scripts for Man Like Mobeen were written by Khan and Andy Milligan, creator of the comedy drama Undercover and script writer for television presenters Ant & Dec. Khan has stated that he wanted the show to portray "the funny yet complex realities of life for young working class men and women in Britain today", alongside an authentic account of Birmingham, which he feels "gets almost no positive representation in the media".

== Episodes ==
=== Pilot (2016) ===
No. overall	Title	Original release date
1a	"Comedy Feeds: Man Like Mobeen Pilot"	6 October 2016
The story of Mobeen Deen, a Muslim, English, 27 year old trying to leave behind a life of crime in Birmingham after finding his faith.

=== Series 1 (2017) ===
No. overall	No. in series	Title	Directed by	Written by	Original release date
1	1	"Bagpuss"	Ollie Parsons	Guz Khan and Andy Milligan	17 December 2017
Eight paid a stranger £150 for what he was conned into believing was a laptop, which is actually a dead cat in a bag. Based on a description of a 'Brown male, in jogging bottoms' dealing drugs, Eight is arrested by armed police. The real culprit is Shahid, a Small Heath dealer who uses 14-year-old Kareema to move his gear. Kareema asks Mobeen's sister Aqsa to help her hide Shahid's drugs from the police and she agrees. When Mobeen finds out, he physically confronts Shahid.
2	2	"Wifey Riddim"	Ollie Parsons	Guz Khan and Andy Milligan	17 December 2017
Mobeen's little sister Aqsa is suspended from school for fighting bullies. Believing that Aqsa would benefit from a female role model, Mobeen agrees to Uncle Habib's suggestion that he meet Khadijah and her father to discuss an arranged marriage. Things do not go to plan as Uncle Shady attends the meeting and ends up in a physical fight with Khadijah's father.
3	3	"Upper Room"	Ollie Parsons	Guz Khan and Andy Milligan	17 December 2017
Mobeen and Nate visit Eight's grandfather, who is terminally ill. He confesses to a bigamous marriage to Jamila, an assistant at his video rental business, and asks Mobeen to take him to see her at his shop one last time. When the four men arrive, Eight's grandfather reveals that Jamila left ten years ago and he actually wanted to go to the shop to dispose of a stash of pornographic VHS tapes before he dies and his other wife, Nadia, finds them.
4	4	"H-ALTRight"	Ollie Parsons	Guz Khan and Andy Milligan	17 December 2017
Mobeen takes the blame when Aqsa throws a flask at racist leader Robbie Worthington during a demonstration, and is arrested. He finds himself in the back of a police van with Worthington. The two argue and Worthington faints. After the pair are released, Aqsa again throws her flask at Worthington.

=== Series 2 (2019) ===
No. overall	No. in series	Title	Directed by	Written by	Original release date
5	1	"Prom Night"	Ollie Parsons	Guz Khan and Andy Milligan	6 February 2019
Mobeen is worried about rumours of debauchery and the threat of a stabbing at Aqsa's prom night, so attends with her in a car borrowed by Eight from a local gangster, Azaar, without his permission. Azaar drives by, recognises his car and threatens Eight, but the police arrive to investigate rumours of knife crime and the gang disperse. Ridwan, a classmate of Aqsa's who has a crush on her, arrives with a katana and is lectured by his hero, Mobeen. While playing with the katana, Mobeen is tasered by police.
6	2	"Wrestling with the NHS"	Ollie Parsons	Guz Khan and Andy Milligan	6 February 2019
Aqsa is injured during a game of WWE and is taken to hospital by Mobeen, Nate and Eight. While waiting for Aqsa to be treated, Mobeen meets an upper class man who complains about waiting times in the overstretched A&E and espouses racist views. Eight gets lost in the hospital and, posing as a doctor, performs surgery on the upper class man. The hospital authorities become worried about how Aqsa obtained her injury and call the police, however the policeman who arrives knows Mobeen and states that he's sure he would never intentionally hurt his sister. After this, the upper class man comes to the police officer and complains about his anus being stitched up.
7	3	"Return of the Pack"	Ollie Parsons	Guz Khan and Andy Milligan	6 February 2019
Mobeen's old friend Cal is released from prison and struggles to adjust to a crime-free life. Nate and Eight organise a homecoming party for Cal but Azaar arrives and Cal robs him at gunpoint. Aqsa is angry with Mobeen when she finds out he isn't her official legal guardian.
8	4	"Fake News"	Ollie Parsons	Guz Khan and Andy Milligan	6 February 2019
While queuing outside an indoor mini golf centre, where Mobeen, Nate, Eight and Aqsa are going to celebrate Aqsa's 16th birthday, Mobeen is filmed punching a dog, which is sent to attack him by its owner, who'd argued with Mobeen about her place in the queue. The video goes viral and Mobeen enlists Uncle Shady's help to remove it from the internet. While Mobeen is on a date with Aqsa's teacher, Miss Aitken, Nate and Eight are attacked by Azaar and his gang, leaving Mobeen plotting revenge.

=== Series 3 (2020) ===
No. overall	No. in series	Title	Directed by	Written by	Original release date
9	1	"You Reap What You Sow"	Ollie Parsons	Guz Khan and Andy Milligan	26 January 2020
10	2	"Moving Food"	Ollie Parsons	Guz Khan and Andy Milligan	26 January 2020
11	3	"Permanent Exclusion"	Ollie Parsons	Guz Khan and Andy Milligan	26 January 2020
12	4	"Boys in the Wood"	Ollie Parsons	Guz Khan and Andy Milligan	26 January 2020
13	5	"This Is the Ends"	Ollie Parsons	Guz Khan and Andy Milligan	26 January 2020

=== Series 4 (2023) ===
No. overall	No. in series	Title	Directed by	Written by	Original release date
14	1	"Gotta Catch 'Em All"	Akaash Meeda	Guz Khan and Andy Milligan	8 June 2023
Mobeen and Nate are 2 weeks away from finishing their sentences, with Mobeen being a designated listener. His work as a listener gets him into trouble with an inmate known as Megalodon, who attempts to transfer with Sajid's cousin Chippy. Aqsa returns, and complains about medical school.
15	2	"It's Not What You Know..."	Akaash Meeda	Guz Khan and Andy Milligan	8 June 2023
While in the prison infirmary trying to befriend a man named "Memory Stick", who has information on Khan, he meets Nida, the infirmary doctor, who takes interest in Mobeen and helps his sister Aqsa getting a placement for her medical degree. Nate and Harper start to develop a friendship, which makes Mobeen jealous.
16	3	"For the Many, Not the Few..."	Akaash Meeda	Guz Khan and Andy Milligan	8 June 2023
Mobeen tries to visit Nida in the night, but is caught by Harper and Nate, who force him to get information on Memory Stick, whose name is revealed to be Colin. An inmate known as Jamal needs help dealing with losing his kids, and Mobeen and Harper deal with him, which in turn makes Colin agree to work with them. Megalodon attempts to attack Mobeen when he tries to enter Jamal's cell, which is stopped when he is defended by Chippy and Sajid. As a result, Megalodon incapacitates Chippy, and Mobeen tries to kill him. Megalodon knocks him and Sajid out, and starts a prison riot.
17	4	"Death Row Records"	Akaash Meeda	Guz Khan and Andy Milligan	8 June 2023
Mobeen and Sajid escape their cell and escape to the Chaplain during the riot, along with Harper, Nate, and Colin. Megalodon arrives with Nida - revealed to be the daughter of Khan - who takes the memory stick. Megalodon then stabs Mobeen while the Tornado Team enter. A mid-credits scene shows Mobeen awake in the hospital bed, and Aqsa in Sharjah, about to be in a meeting with Khan.

=== Series 5 (2025) ===
No. overall	No. in series	Title	Directed by	Written by	Original release date
18	1	"Tainted Love"	David Sant	Guz Khan and Andy Milligan	1 May 2025
19	2	"No Diggity"	David Sant	Guz Khan and Andy Milligan	1 May 2025
20	3	"Turkish Delight"	David Sant	Guz Khan and Andy Milligan	1 May 2025
21	4	"Boy Like Mobeen"	David Sant	Guz Khan and Andy Milligan	1 May 2025
22	5	"The Curse"	David Sant	Guz Khan and Andy Milligan	1 May 2025
23	6	"That's Life"	David Sant	Guz Khan and Andy Milligan	1 May 2025

== Critical reception ==
Writing for the Financial Times, Harriet Fitch Little described the first series as "an exceptionally funny character comedy that spins jokes with a subtlety that’s rare for such a young writer". Before the release of the third series in January 2020, the NME's Gary Ryan said that Man Like Mobeen "isn't just one of the funniest sitcoms of recent times – it may also be one of the most important" and described the show as "Only Fools and Horses meets Breaking Bad – a lightning-in-a-bottle sitcom that features flawed-but-loveable characters you enjoy hanging out with, while actually saying something about the world they inhabit".
