= Mark Silcox =

British comedian and actor

- Born: India
- Children: 4 children

Comedy career
- Medium: Stand-up comedy, acting

Mark Silcox is a comedian and actor who has been performing since 2008. He is most known for being a stand-up, making it to the finals of the BBC New Comedy Award in 2013 and being one of several Asian comedians to be featured on BBC's The Big Asian Stand-Up, as well as for his starring role as Joe Lycett's assistant on the Channel 4 consumer rights comedy show Joe Lycett's Got Your Back and for playing Mohammed Shah "Shady" Shaheed in BBC Three's Man Like Mobeen.

== Early life ==
Silcox grew up in India, where he received a master's degree in chemistry and worked as a lecturer. He is from Madhya Pradesh and was living near Bhopal in the 1980s. Silcox moved to UK in 1990, and completed a PhD in Analytical Chemistry at Imperial College London.

== Career ==
A part-time teacher, Silcox is known for his experimental, deadpan style of anti-humour. He originally began performing in 2008 after attending a stand-up comedy course from City Lit. After 50 gigs, he moved to Germany to focus on a career in science, returning to the UK to start gigging again in 2012. Silcox was a BBC New Comedy Award finalist in 2013. He has performed a show at the Edinburgh Fringe every year since 2014.

In 2018, Silcox starred in three episodes of the YouTube mini-series 'Silcox Investigates', playing a private investigator. In 2019 he featured as Edwin Herbert, Baron Tangley in Jay Foreman and Paul Kendler's Unfinished London YouTube series.

In 2019, Silcox began appearing as Joe Lycett’s sidekick on Channel 4's Joe Lycett's Got Your Back, with a clip of him challenging Burger King on their motto "Have it your way" going viral and prompting a response from Burger King themselves.

In 2020, Silcox played the role of Raj in “The Telethon”, a bonus level of the video game Not For Broadcast.

In 2023, Silcox featured in a minor supporting role in the music video "Eggerson Keaveney" by YouTuber Jazz Emu.

== Television credits ==
Year	Programme	Role	TV channel
2015	An Immigrant's Guide to Britain	Himself	Channel 4
2016	Rovers	Ronnie	Sky One
2017	Paul G Raymond's Valentine: Maathraboodham & Son	-	Sky Arts
2017	Romesh: Comedians in Pubs Talking Comedy	Himself	BBC Three
2017	Twirlywoos Series 4: 17. More About Cleaning	Unnamed character	CBeebies
2017–2025	Man Like Mobeen	Uncle Shady	BBC Three
2018	The Luke McQueen Pilots	-	BBC Three
2018	Sick of It	-	Sky One
2018	The Big Asian Stand-Up	Himself	BBC
2019–present	Joe Lycett's Got Your Back	Himself	Channel 4
2019–present	Mandy	Various	BBC Two
2022	Big Boys	Dhru 'Ru' Pal	Channel 4
2022	Sneakerhead	-	Dave
2024	Outnumbered	-	BBC One
