= It's Not What You Know (radio series) =

- It's Not What You Know promotional image with Joe Lycett (series 4)
- Genre: Panel game
- Running time: 30 minutes
- Country of origin: United Kingdom
- Language(s): English
- Home station: BBC Radio 4
- Starring: Miles Jupp (Series 1–3); Joe Lycett (Series 4-5)
- Created by: Miles Jupp
- Written by: Joe Lycett; James Kettle
- Produced by: Sam Michell (Series 1–2); Matt Stronge (Series 3–5); Adnan Ahmed (Series 5)
- Recording studio: BBC Radio Theatre
- Original release: 23 February 2012 – Present
- No. of series: 5
- No. of episodes: 25
- Opening theme: "What You Know" by Two Door Cinema Club
- Website: Official website

It's Not What You Know is a BBC Radio 4 comedy panel show created and originally hosted by Miles Jupp, beginning on 23 February 2012. Series four and five are hosted by Joe Lycett. The show features three celebrity contestants who have to answer questions based on the knowledge of people that they know personally, such as friends or relatives. Points are scored for how accurately the contestant predicts their counterpart.

== History ==
It was developed from a round created by Jupp in the first series of the gameshow It's Your Round. In that case the game was called What Does My Dad Know?, in which panellists had to guess what answers Miles Jupp's dad gave to various trivia questions.

== Rounds ==
- It's What They Know - The nominees are asked about their respective panellists; the panellists need to second-guess what their nominees answered.
- It's Now What You Know - The panellists are asked about their respective nominees to find out how well they know them.
- Which Nominee? - The panellists are given an answer and need to identify which of the nominees gave it.
- The Big One/One Massive Question - The panellists need to predict the answer given by their nominee to a suitably 'big' but mundane question (e.g., how do they take their tea, what is their favourite item of cutlery).

== Episodes ==
Winners are highlighted in bold.

=== Series 1 ===
| Episode | First broadcast | Guests |
|---|---|---|
| 01x01 | 23 February 2012 | Rachel Johnson, **Desmond Lynam**, Mark Steel |
| 01x02 | 1 March 2012 | Jason Cook, Simon Day, **Rebecca Front** |
| 01x03 | 8 March 2012 | **Ed Byrne**, Roisin Conaty, Richard Madeley |
| 01x04 | 15 March 2012 | Emma Freud, **Shaun Keaveny**, Tom Wrigglesworth |

=== Series 2 ===
| Episode | First broadcast | Guests |
|---|---|---|
| 02x01 | 9 July 2013 | Frankie Boyle, **Alan Johnson**, Diane Morgan |
| 02x02 | 16 July 2013 | **Jonathan Agnew**, Grace Dent, **Frank Skinner** |
| 02x03 | 23 July 2013 | Bridget Christie, **Ainsley Harriott**, Justin Moorhouse |
| 02x04 | 30 July 2013 | **Dougie Anderson**, **Nick Helm**, Isy Suttie |
| 02x05 | 6 August 2013 | Andrew Maxwell, **Kirsty Wark**, Francis Wheen |
| 02x06 | 13 August 2013 | **Dave Gorman**, Joe Lycett, Anneka Rice |
| 02x07 (Edinburgh Special) | 20 August 2013 | **Kevin Bridges**, Hannah Gadsby, Rory McGrath |

=== Series 3 ===
| Episode | First broadcast | Guests |
|---|---|---|
| 03x01 | 30 June 2015 | Nathan Caton, **Sarah Millican**, **Richard Osman** |
| 03x02 | 7 July 2015 | Dane Baptiste, Sara Cox, **Seann Walsh** |
| 03x03 | 14 July 2015 | **Christopher Biggins**, **Romesh Ranganathan**, Katherine Ryan |
| 03x04 | 21 July 2015 | Cornelius Lysaght, Lucy Porter, **Tom Wrigglesworth** |
| 03x05 | 28 July 2015 | **Russell Grant**, Elis James, Penny Smith |
| 03x06 | 4 August 2015 | **Susan Calman**, Vernon Kay, Sara Pascoe |

=== Series 4 ===
| | First broadcast | Guests |
|---|---|---|
| 04x01 | 29 September 2016 | **Nish Kumar**, Tim Lovejoy, Holly Walsh |
| 04x02 | 6 October 2016 | Adrian Chiles, Zoe Lyons, **Mae Martin** |
| 04x03 | 13 October 2016 | Aisling Bea, **Terry Christian**, Jocelyn Jee Esien |
| 04x04 | 20 October 2016 | Vanessa Feltz, Tom Parry, **Andy Parsons** |

=== Series 5 ===
| | First broadcast | Guests |
|---|---|---|
| 05x01 | 7 March 2018 | Desiree Burch, **Tony Hawks**, **Rachel Riley** |
| 05x02 | 14 March 2018 | Gyles Brandreth, Sarah Kendall, **Phil Wang** |
| 05x03 | 21 March 2018 | **Jack Carroll**, Melanie C, Kerry Godliman |
| 05x04 | 28 March 2018 | **Fern Britton**, **Ivo Graham**, Russell Kane |
