= Headlands School =

School in Bridlington, East Riding of Yorkshire, England

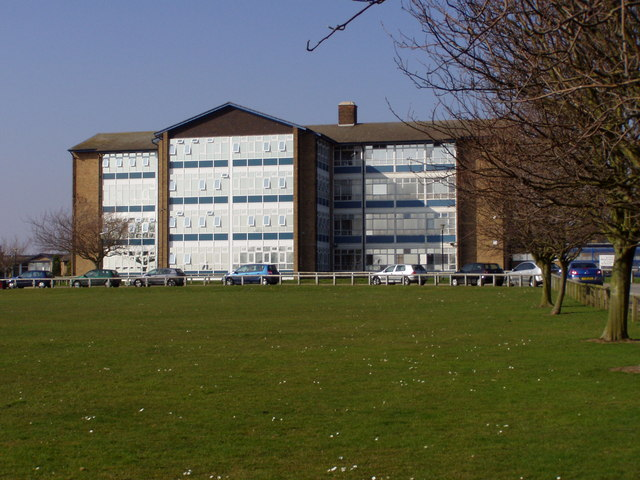

Location
- Sewerby Road; Bridlington, East Riding of Yorkshire, YO16 6UR; England; 54°05′57″N 00°11′01″W

Information
- Type: Community school
- Motto: Pride, Aspire, Respect
- Established: 1965
- Department for Education URN: 118085 Tables
- Ofsted: Reports
- Headteacher: Sarah Bone
- Gender: coeducational
- Age: 11 to 18
- Enrolment: 886
- Website: headlandsschool.co.uk

Headlands School is a coeducational comprehensive school on Sewerby Road near the B1255, Bridlington, East Riding of Yorkshire, England. The school has 886 pupils aged 11–18.

Headlands is one of two secondary schools in Bridlington, the other being Bridlington School, further south in the town. Headlands draws pupils the Bridlington area and surrounding villages such as Flamborough and Bempton.

== History ==
Headlands School was formed in 1965 by the amalgamation of a boys' and a girls' secondary modern school and became a comprehensive in 1972. The school was on two sites until April 2002. The Lower School was on St. Alban Road and has now been redeveloped by Barratt Developments with around 30 houses. The former Upper School on Sewerby Road is now the only site. In 2002 a £5,000,000 PFI project established the school on one site and led to vastly improved facilities.

Headlands School became a specialist school in science in 2002, and was granted the Sportsmark award by Sport England in 2003. It is notable in having its own astronomy department complete with its own reflecting telescope mounted within a free-standing observatory on the school grounds.

In 2013 Mrs Bone became headteacher following Mr Ratherham's departure earlier in the year.

== Ofsted reports ==
In the report of their February 2004 inspection, Ofsted described the school as "This is a good school which is working well to improve pupils’ learning. ... Very good leadership by the headteacher, and good leadership by key staff promotes learning.". They assessed the school as 'Good', point three on a seven point scale, and the sixth form as 'Very Good', point 2.

The school was placed in "Special Measures" by Ofsted after a February 2008 inspection. Four areas for improvement were identified :

- Raise achievement and standards across the school.
- Eliminate all unsatisfactory teaching and improve the proportion of good teaching.
- Ensure systems to improve behaviour are effective and are applied consistently.
- Improve the effectiveness of leadership and management.

The effectiveness of the sixth form was considered satisfactory. Shortly after the inspection, the school formed a partnership with South Hunsley School to help it make progress. Subsequent monitoring visits by Ofsted in July 2008 and December 2008 judged that the school was making satisfactory progress towards meeting the areas for improvement. In October 2009 the school came out of special measures and given a rating of "satisfactory with good features" by Ofsted.

In February 2018 the school was rated as 'requires improvement' by Ofsted. Inspectors acknowledged improvements had been made.

== Notable former pupils ==
- Rosie Jones, comedian and actress
- Emily Asquith, boxer
- Leon Cole, actor

== Sexual offence prosecutions ==
Between 2006 and 2010 five Headlands School teachers were prosecuted for sexual offences:

- Ian Blott, art teacher, was jailed in August 2006 for four years after a two-year affair with a girl pupil.
- Steven Edwards, science teacher, was jailed in February 2007 for four years and nine months for engaging in under-age sex with three girl pupils.
- Terry Mann, an IT teacher, was given a suspended prison sentence, in January 2008, after pleaded guilty to two charges of making indecent photographs of a child. He had earlier admitted sexual activity with a 15-year-old girl. These incidents occurred after he had moved to Withernsea High School.
- Lindsey Jane Collett, a 26-year-old teaching assistant, sent a male teenage pupil racy texts and photographs. In August 2008, she was sentenced to a six-month conditional discharge.
- Christopher Reen, a class supervisor and martial arts teacher, who replaced Lindsey Jane Collett, was jailed for 40 months, in March 2010, after admitting six counts of sexual activity with a 15-year-old female pupil.
