= Joe Lycett's Got Your Back =

British television consumer affairs comedy show

- Also known as: Hugo Boss's Got Your Back
- Genre: Comedy; Consumer Affairs
- Presented by: Joe Lycett; Mark Silcox; Rosie Jones; Sophie Duker
- Theme music composer: Holley Gray
- Country of origin: United Kingdom
- Original language: English
- No. of series: 3
- No. of episodes: 22

Production
- Running time: 30 minutes (inc. adverts) (series 1); 60 minutes (inc. adverts) (series 2 & 3)
- Production company: Rumpus Media

Original release
- Network: Channel 4
- Release: 5 April 2019 – 20 February 2024

Joe Lycett's Got Your Back is a Channel 4 consumer affairs comedy programme. It is presented by the titular comedian Joe Lycett, with assistance from deadpan comedian Mark Silcox, plus a guest television personality. The programme also contains pieces from comedians Rosie Jones and Sophie Duker.

The show involves the presenters doing comedic skits explaining and resolving consumer issues that viewers have raised to the programme.

== Premise ==
Before the programme, Lycett's own comedic stand-up show often involves a previous complaint he had with Leeds City Council over a parking issue that went viral, involving a humorous exchange of email messages between himself and the council. This got picked up by the production company Rumpus Media and led to the creation of his own show about consumer affairs. Asked about the show, Lycett said he wanted to create a "sexy Watchdog".

== Notable cases ==
=== Boss Brewing vs. Hugo Boss ===
In the second series, the show tackled a trademark issue between the Welsh brewer Boss Brewing and the German fashion house Hugo Boss. The fashion house said that the brewery couldn't use the name Boss on the brewery's beer including the brewery's stout Boss Black, as the name was already a trademark for Hugo Boss. In response, Lycett changed his personal name by deed poll to Hugo Boss, and created a fashion runway for a wrist brace, which the fashion house didn't have the trademark rights to, outside on a public street at the atelier's flagship store in Regent Street, London. After the show was aired, the fashion house withdrew the complaint and agreed that the brewery could use Boss on its beers.

Due to the name change, Lycett was known as Hugo Boss both personally and professionally for seven weeks between March and April 2020, and the programme was temporarily renamed to Hugo Boss's Got Your Back.

=== Ross McEwan ===
Got Your Back took on a case in which a nurse had been scammed out of £11,800 by a fraudster posing as an employee from her bank NatWest. Initially, NatWest only refunded £3,800, and said the rest could not be retrieved as the nurse should have been aware of scammers. In response, the programme tried to impersonate the head of NatWest Group at the time, Ross McEwan, on social media. After building a profile, they then later put out multiple prank tweets, one of which said "I've got a smelly bum bum". Later, Lycett went to the bank's headquarters in London and made a scene in the reception, pretending to have a meeting with the bank's chief executive.

In response to the programme's investigations the bank reviewed what had happened, and apologised to their customer for failing to acknowledge she had been victim of a highly suspicious fraud that had fooled her completely. They agreed to fully refund the remaining balance she was owed.

=== Uber Eats ===
Uber Eats came under scrutiny after the show received reports that food was coming from establishments that had a hygiene rating of zero from the Food Standards Agency. Some restaurants were found to have mice living in the kitchen, and chicken was being stored inappropriately. Both placed customers at serious risk of food poisoning, including salmonella.

Got Your Back set up their own takeaway called "Le Sauter", which was based in an old skip and had no legal permits. Despite failing every possible hygiene test, Uber Eats made no checks on the establishment whatsoever, nor did their delivery drivers notice that the food being offered was unfit for consumption. In response to the programme's findings, Uber Eats promised to make significant changes, including that they would require all restaurants and takeaway establishments to have a rating from the Food Hygiene Rating Scheme of two or higher.

=== Hermes (Evri) ===
Hermes were investigated after multiple customers complained about mishandling of their deliveries. One complaint came from a small company that made dog beds, which had used Hermes to courier a distinctive dog bed to a customer - but the dog bed never reached the customer, and the company later found the item on sale on eBay. The delivery note was visible amongst several screenshots of the product on the website. Hermes failed to explain why the item was never delivered and only paid a nominal £20 as compensation, despite this not being the first time they had failed to deliver the company's parcels.

The programme makers learned that Hermes often sent items it could not deliver, or claimed to have lost, to auction. Undercover investigators discovered that an auction house regularly received undelivered or lost items from Hermes, despite a significant number bearing delivery notes with clear information on when it had been sent, who the recipient was, and the return address of the sender. After being presented with the programme's findings, Hermes responded by compensating several customers whose items had been wrongfully sent to auction.

=== Boohoo.com ===
Boohoo.com and its sister company PrettyLittleThing were discovered selling stained clothes and many customers received the same item they had sent back. Customers' complaints ranged from food stains to several types of bodily fluids. Lycett then gave the company the nickname of Poohoo, in reference to frequent faeces markings on clothes. He then got his team together and they bought products, stained them and got a full refund. They then managed to receive the same item four times. Following the programme's findings, Boohoo.com apologised and said that quality control would be increased and something like this should never happen again.

== Awards ==
In 2021, the programme won the RTS Programme Award for Best Formatted Popular Factual.

== See also ==
- Joe Lycett vs the Oil Giant – a documentary produced by Lycett and Rumpus Media
- That's Life! – a BBC magazine programme that included consumer affairs journalism and comedic skits
- Watchdog – a BBC consumer affairs programme
