= Dion Kitson =

English artist

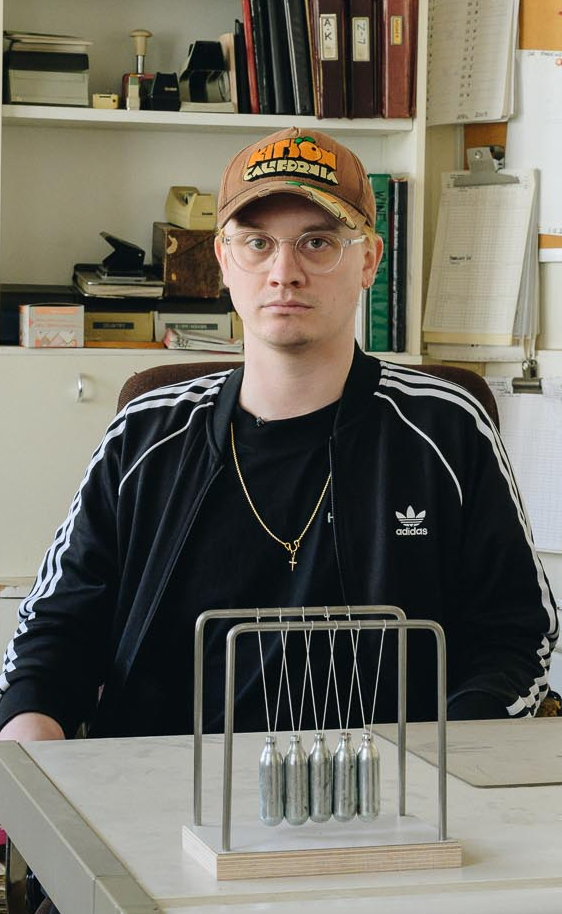
- Born: Dudley, West Midlands
- Education: Birmingham School of Art
- Occupation: Artist
- Website: www.dionkitson.com

Dion Kitson is a contemporary British artist whose works includes sculpture, installation, film, and found objects. In 2020, Dion Kitson was awarded the ACS Studio Prize.

== Early life and education ==
Kitson was raised in Dudley, in the heart of the Black Country. He studied at the Birmingham School of Art, where he developed a multidisciplinary approach influenced by Dadaism, street art and conceptual art practices.

Kitson's work examines British cultural traditions, utilizing humour to challenge perceptions of class and identity. His artistic practice often involves reimagining common materials and found objects, influenced by Dadaism and artists such as Marcel Duchamp and Damien Hirst.

== Notable works and exhibitions ==
Kitson's exhibitions include the following.

- Baked in Gold – Greggs Jewellery Collaboration: Launched during London Fashion Week 2024.
- Rue Britannia (2024) at Ikon Gallery.
- Silver Lining (2024) at Ikon Gallery.

== Collaborations ==
Kitson has collaborated with comedian Joe Lycett on various projects. Lycett has often featured Kitson's works in his shows. Lycett has praised Kitson, stating that he "understands the state of our nation better than anyone, and why it is the way it is: funny, and beautiful, and dumb."
