= Pushers (TV series) =

British comedy television series

- Genre: Comedy
- Created by: Rosie Jones; Peter Fellows
- Screenplay by: Rosie Jones; Peter Fellows
- Starring: Rosie Jones; Ryan McParland
- Country of origin: United Kingdom
- Original language: English
- No. of series: 1
- No. of episodes: 6

Production
- Executive producers: Clelia Mountford; Michael Livingstone; Tom Thostrup
- Producer: Charlie Laurie
- Production companies: Merman Television; 2LE Media

Original release
- Network: Channel 4
- Release: 19 June – 3 July 2025

Pushers is a 2025 British comedy television series broadcast on Channel 4 co-written by and starring Rosie Jones.

== Premise ==
A young woman with cerebral palsy tried to use society's assumptions for her benefit to pursue criminal activity and evade detection.

After having her benefits unfairly reduced, Emily joins her old school friend Ewen in drug dealing to make money, recruiting other disabled people to join their gang in order to be undetected by the police. Using Emily's workplace, charity Wee C U, as a cover, the gang sell cocaine and later spice.

== Cast ==
- Rosie Jones as Emily Dawkins, a woman with cerebral palsy that resorts to drug dealing after her benefits are reduced. She has a day job at a charity, Wee C U, but is currently an unpaid volunteer due to the charity's inability to pay its staff. Her codename is Judy Finnigan.
- Ryan McParland as Ewen Sheridan, an old school friend of Emily's that recruits her to help him deal drugs. Despite asking for Emily's help and setting up the gang, he's fed up of crime and wants to get out. His codename is Brown Hawk.
- Jon Furlong as Sean, a man with scoliosis that stands up to Emily during her first drug deal. She then hires him to act as the gang's muscle. His codename is Shirley.
- Libby Mai as Hope, Emily's coworker at Wee C U who discovers Emily and Ewen discussing their drug dealing plans at the pub and offers to help them as their tech person. Libby is the one who persuades the gang to begin selling Spice in addition to Cocaine and teaches Emily about money laundering. Unlike her other co-workers, she doesn't have a physical disability however she is presumably neurodiverse like her actor. While Mai is nonbinary, Hope is a cisgender woman. She refuses to take a codename.
- Rhiannon Clements as Jo Tull-Hogg, Emily's love interest and boss at Wee C U, a charity reviewing accessible toilets in public places which isn't making enough profit and may be shutdown before the end of the year. She has a foreshortened left arm.
- Ruben Reuter as Harry Clarke, Emily's coworker at Wee C U that she recruits to keep up the charity façade and distract from the drug dealing. He has Down Syndrome. His codename is Bassey.
- Trevor Dwyer-Lynch as Masir Mason, a man with a minibus who is recruited by Ewen to join the gang, primarily so they can use the minibus as transport and him as additional muscle. His codename is Minibus Masir.
- Lynn Hunter as Patricia Sheridan, Ewen's mother with MS. She's recruited to join the gang due to her previous criminal experience.
- Clive Russell as Craig Dawkins, Emily's father who she lives with.
- Rosalyn Wright as Janine, a woman working for DWP who reduces Emily's benefits in the first episode and kickstarts the plot.
- Cassie Bradley as Leo, Ewen's love interest and ex-girlfriend from school. She has a son called Dwayne with her ex Ben.
- Jade Asha as Nicole.

== Production ==
The idea for the series was developed by Rosie Jones with co-writer Peter Fellows in 2018. It was a Channel 4 comedy short on 6 May 2022 with the name Disability Benefits before it was expanded to a six-part sitcom for Channel 4. The series is produced by Merman Television and 2LE Media. Clelia Mountford, Michael Livingstone and Tom Thostrup are executive producers with Charlie Laurie as producer.

The cast includes Jones, Ryan McParland, Rhiannon Clements, Jon Furlong, Clive Russell, Lynn Hunter, Trevor Dwyer-Lynch, Ruben Reuter, and Libby Mai.

== Broadcast ==
The series was first made available on Channel 4+, their on demand service for premium users, on 5 June 2025, before being made available to the wider public on their main channel and online on 19 June 2025.

== Episodes ==
Episode No.	Title	Synopsis	Premium release date	Public release date	UK viewers
1	What's in the Parcel?	When Emily's disability benefits are cut, her old school friend Ewen spots an opportunity.	5 June 2025	19 June 2025	TBA
2	Who's in Our Gang?	Emily embarks on her new career as a drug dealer and recruits a criminal gang of misfits.	5 June 2025	19 June 2025	TBA
3	Why Does He Want to Cut Off Your D*ck?	A double date coincides with the biggest deal yet and Emily tries drugs for the first time.	5 June 2025	26 June 2025	TBA
4	When Did You Last Go to The Haçienda?	Ewen wants out of the drugs game, but Emily has other ideas.	5 June 2025	26 June 2025	TBA
5	Where's My Bacon?	Ewen realises his mum is missing, while Emily comes face-to-face with a rival drug lord.	5 June 2025	3 July 2025	TBA
6	Will We Die?	With the net closing in, can Emily, Ewen and the gang find a way out of the drugs game?	5 June 2025	3 July 2025	TBA

== Reception ==
For the role, Rosie Jones was nominated for best actress in a comedy in March 2026 at the British Academy Television Awards.
