= Tolu Ogunmefun =

British actor (born 1989)

Tolulope Charles Ogunmefun (born 29 March 1989) is a British actor and Internet personality. He is best known for his roles in Man Like Mobeen and Sick Note as well as for his TikTok and YouTube channels.
