= Joe Lycett vs the Oil Giant =

2021 British documentary

- Genre: Documentary
- Presented by: Joe Lycett
- Country of origin: United Kingdom
- Original language: English

Production
- Running time: 47 minutes

Original release
- Network: Channel 4
- Release: 24 October 2021

Joe Lycett vs the Oil Giant is a 2021 documentary in which the comedian and presenter Joe Lycett protested against the oil company Shell plc. It sees Lycett produce two adverts mocking the company and its CEO, Ben van Beurden, for greenwashing and meet with experts and activists who are critical of the company. It aired on 24 October 2021 to mixed reviews.

== Synopsis ==
External videos
- "The Ad Shell Would NEVER Make"; The advert Lycett produces during the documentary.

Joe Lycett reviews a Royal Dutch Shell advert about their plan to reach carbon neutrality by 2050, despite a dearth of scheduled changes to be made in the 2020s. The academic Mike Berners-Lee is critical of Shell, accusing them of greenwashing by use of adverts that focus on their use of renewable energy, which makes up 5% of their operations. Lycett also consults John Donovan, a man who runs an anti-Shell website for whistleblowers to contribute to, and a lawyer whose research into Shell's adverts concludes that they have a "real risk of misleading" viewers.

Lycett speaks to the Shell 7, who did £25,000 of damage to Shell's UK headquarters in order to get tried by a jury, who found them not guilty of all charges. As a petrol supply crisis hits the UK, Lycett interviews the executive director of the International Energy Agency (IEA), Fatih Birol, who says that Shell is continuing to create new oil fields despite IEA opposition. Unable to find someone at Shell's headquarters to talk to, Lycett leaves a houseplant to be delivered to their CEO, Ben van Beurden.

Lycett makes an advert in which greenery is interspersed with images of fire, while overlaid text is critical of Shell's mostly non-renewable energy production. He gets a response from Shell, who points him to their appearance on the IEA's The Energy Podcast, which does not answer the questions Lycett asked. Lycett speaks to Darren Cullen, an artist who produces satirical advertising. He has been working on an exhibition: a bus with exterior adverts critical of Shell and interior sculptures that draw attention to the dirty water produced by fracking and other environmental concerns.

After regulators declined his first advert, Lycett produced a second one for social media. In it, he impersonates van Beurden and imitates greenwashed marketing claims as he repeatedly defecates from his mouth. Lily Cole cameos. He premieres the advert on the side of a vehicle outside Shell's UK headquarters, alongside Cullen's bus and a group of dancers (choreographed by Corey Baker) who perform around Lycett.

In Shell's reply to the programme, they say that oil is necessary as the world transitions to lower-carbon alternatives, which they are investing in. Lycett sends van Beurden a message encouraging him to take positive action.

== Production ==
The host, Joe Lycett, was known from the consumer rights programme Joe Lycett's Got Your Back, which featured similar publicity stunts to Joe Lycett vs the Oil Giant. Rumpus Media produced both programmes. Joe Lycett vs the Oil Giant was announced on 7 October 2021. It premiered on Sunday, 24 October, in the 9 p.m. timeslot, as part of Channel 4's climate change-related programming in advance of the 2021 United Nations Climate Change Conference (COP26).

== Reception ==
Ben Dowell of The Times gave the programme three out of five stars. He reviewed that though Lycett is "a superb comedian" with experience in the genre, the investigative journalism was based on "vibe", "conducted over social media" and did not reveal "anything wildly surprising". Dowell attributed Shell's response to "corporate paranoia and marketing flim-flam", that is not unique to the oil industry, and said that they "blundered by not speaking directly to the programme". The Daily Telegraph's Anita Singh gave a two-star review, writing that Shell "doesn't care about Joe Lycett". Singh said that the programme was "a waste of time", beginning with a "half-hearted stunt" outside Shell's UK headquarters, continuing with an advert that made claims that "were never going to make it past advertising clearance" and finishing with a new advert "so terrible – deliberately so, but still – that even Lycett looked embarrassed". Similarly, Ed Power of The Irish Times criticised Lycett's target as too much of a "monolith" for Lycett to have effect, and a "slightly random" choice when the oil company BP is British-founded, (Shell is also a British company). Power said that Lycett lost credibility from "Lycett driving around in a Lexus" and from the "repulsive" advert that "has the unintentional effect of making the satirist even less sympathetic than his powerful adversary".

In contrast, Rachael Sigee rated it four stars in i, praising Lycett as "affable, accessible and with enough quips to keep us interested without stealing the limelight from the issue at hand". Sigee approved of the programme's focus on greenwashing and said that though the advert was not "highbrow", "the tactics of mockery, drawing unwelcome attention and being downright annoying, are as effective tools as any". Stuart Jeffries, in a review for The Guardian, also gave the programme four stars, saying "it's hard not to admire him for ruffling corporate feathers".
