= Joe Lycett =

English comedian (born 1988)

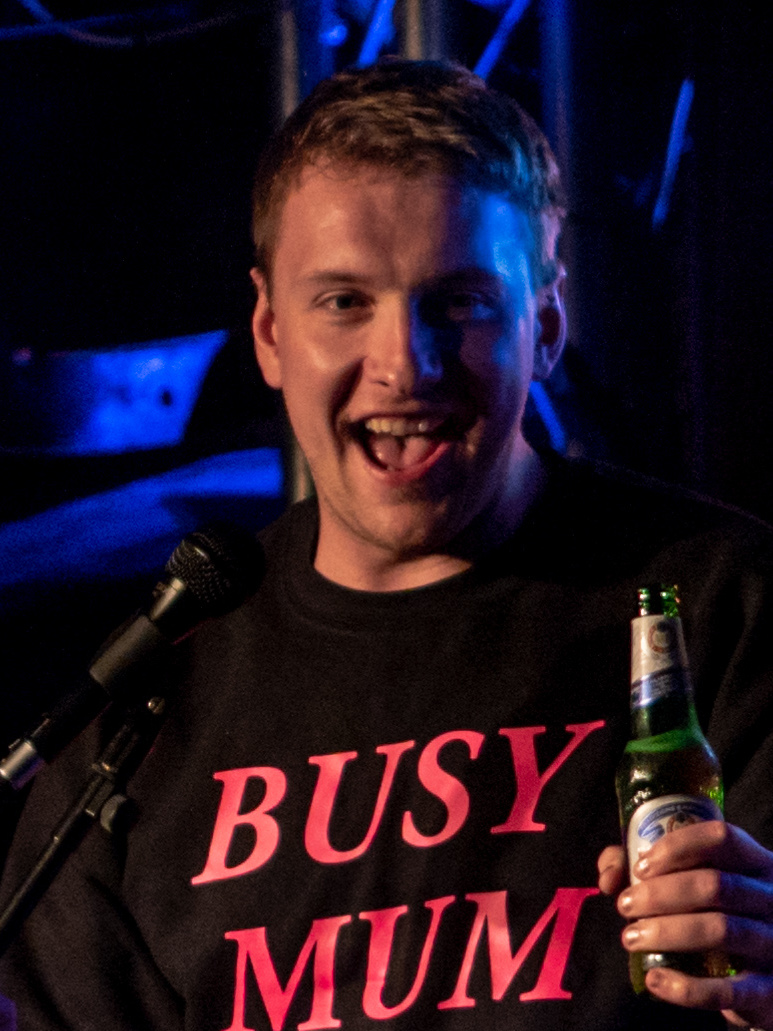
- Lycett performing in 2018
- Born: 5 July 1988 (age 38); Solihull, West Midlands, England
- Education: University of Manchester (BA)
- Partner: "Denise"
- Children: 1

Comedy career
- Years active: 2009–present
- Medium: Stand-up, television
- Website: joelycett.com (2020)

Joe Lycett (born 1988) is a British comedian, television presenter, consumer rights advocate and artist. He has appeared on many TV shows, including Live at the Apollo, Taskmaster, Never Mind the Buzzcocks, 8 Out of 10 Cats, QI, as the announcer on Saturday BBC One show Epic Win, the narrator for Ibiza Weekender and as the presenter on BBC Two's The Great British Sewing Bee, and Channel 4's Joe Lycett's Got Your Back and Travel Man. He has advocated for the LGBTQ community on many occasions.

== Early life and education ==
Joe Lycett was born in 1988 at Solihull Hospital, to David Lycett and Helen née Scholey, and grew up in Solihull. His paternal Lycett family hailed from Staffordshire, while his grandmother's Wilkinson family came from the East Midlands being distantly related to the Wilkinson baronets. In 2021, appearing on the genealogy documentary series Who Do You Think You Are?, he researched the Royal Antediluvian Order of Buffaloes of which his great-grandfather was a member. He also discovered that his great-great-grandfather, Robert Wilkinson, worked as a chimney sweep as a child and later joined the Royal Marines, serving in China during the Second Opium War.

After attending King Edward VI Five Ways Grammar School, Lycett studied drama and English at the University of Manchester, graduating BA. He worked front of house at The Alexandra, Birmingham and Palace Theatre, Manchester.

== Career ==
Lycett performing for the Equality Network's LGBT Rights: Stand-up for Russia event in Edinburgh, August 2013

=== Stage ===
Lycett began performing stand-up in 2009 and won the Chortle Student Comedian of the Year the same year.

Early in his career as a 22-year-old comedian, Lycett appeared on stage alongside Jim Davidson, who is known for his offensive jokes, which have been described as both racist and homophobic, and Lycett complained about Davidson's use of the racial slur "chink" in one of his jokes (which Davidson later removed). The two became friends while touring together (with Davidson's only complaint to Lycett being that he swore too much). "[Jim Davidson's] views on race are incredibly misguided but he is very educated about it. He has read the Quran, and at one point told me in detail about the origins of Rastafarianism", Lycett told the Birmingham Mail in 2011.

In 2015, while performing in York, Lycett was issued with a parking ticket for parking illegally in a taxi rank. The ensuing paper trail of correspondence, between him and City of York Council, was recounted as an anecdote on 8 Out of 10 Cats Does Countdown and later becoming the basis for one of his best-known stand-up routines.

In June 2022, a member of the audience at the Belfast show of his More More More, How Do You Lycett? How Do You Lycett? tour called the PSNI to complain about a joke that referenced a donkey. Lycett bemoaned being investigated by the police over a joke, but was happy to recount his enjoyment from repeating the joke, which he regarded as one of his best, in his messages to the police. The investigation was subsequently closed.

On 6 December 2025, Lycett appeared as the celebrity guest star in Inside No. 9 Stage/Fright at The Alexandra, Birmingham.

On 2 November 2026, Lycett will perform Nassim Soleimanpour's solo play White Rabbit Red Rabbit at the Duchess Theatre in London's West End.

=== Television and video ===
Lycett has appeared on television in Live at the Apollo, 8 Out of 10 Cats, 8 Out of 10 Cats Does Countdown, Celebrity Juice, Never Mind the Buzzcocks, Spicks and Specks, Would I Lie to You?, Insert Name Here, Virtually Famous, and Two Pints of Lager and a Packet of Crisps, and was a regular panellist on the E4 show Dirty Digest. He has co-written narration on ITV2 shows The Magaluf Weekender and Ibiza Weekender. Lycett featured on Alan Davies: As Yet Untitled Christmas Special with Jason Manford, Rev Richard Coles, and Jo Joyner. Lycett starred as one of the contestants in the fourth series of Taskmaster with Mel Giedroyc, Hugh Dennis, Lolly Adefope and Noel Fielding and has made several guest appearances on Sunday Brunch in the absence of one of the regular hosts.

On 12 February 2019, Joe Lycett took over as the new presenter on the fifth series of BBC Two's The Great British Sewing Bee.

Lycett started presenting his consumer show Joe Lycett's Got Your Back, which was branded a "sexy Watchdog" in 2019 with help from various guests and Mark Silcox. The show takes on big corporations, such as airlines and banks, to provide justice for consumers with a humorous spin. The series was renewed for a second series. Lycett describes the show as "a cross between Rogue Traders and RuPaul's Drag Race". He also presents Channel 4's Late Night Lycett.

Since taking over from Richard Ayoade in 2021, Lycett has presented Travel Man on Channel 4, as of December 2024.

In 2021, Lycett presented the television documentary Joe Lycett vs the Oil Giant.

On 4 September 2022, Lycett appeared as a panellist on the début issue of Sunday with Laura Kuenssberg. The show featured an interview with Liz Truss, who at the time was considered highly likely to win, which she later did, the July–September 2022 Conservative Party leadership election and therefore become Prime Minister. The cost-of-living crisis, caused in part by high energy bills, was a current significant issue. Truss had given few interviews since the start of the election campaign to elect the Leader of the Conservative Party. On the show, Truss endeavoured to give assurances. When asked for comment by Kuenssberg, Lycett said with deadpan delivery that he was "very Right-wing" and that he loved the clarity and was reassured by Truss's statements about the proposed measures to address the crisis. Deploying apophasis, he suggested that he would not say that from dregs Truss was the "backwash of available MPs". This was met with incredulity from Kuenssberg and titters from other guests. In a similar vein, Lycett went on to state Truss was right to ignore economists' stark predictions. Several days later, MP Steve Brine asked BBC Director-General Tim Davie about "the Joe Lycett débacle" when Davie appeared before the parliamentary Digital, Culture, Media and Sport Select Committee.

In March 2023 Lycett began hosting the comedy variety show Late Night Lycett that includes brief interviews with celebrity guests and comedy segments. One comedy segment includes a celebrity minding Lycett's local corner shop in Kings Heath because the owner is in the studio audience with Lycett crossing over live to the celebrity in the shop to chat to them about how things are going or asking the guests if there is anything they want from the shop. There was also a recurring segment that as part of Lycett's scheme to hire trainees with no previous experience, Linda Biscuits, portrayed by Chilli the Labrador, is shown appearing with the production team. Linda is shown operating a camera whilst vision of cats playing in a field comes across the live feed for the show as well as being shown to have urinated on the set beside the stage where Lycett is speaking to guests.

In March 2025, he starred in the first series of LOL: Last One Laughing UK, hosted by Jimmy Carr and Roisin Conaty, alongside Richard Ayoade, Sara Pascoe, Lou Sanders, Rob Beckett, Judi Love, Bob Mortimer, Joe Wilkinson, Daisy May Cooper, and Harriet Kemsley. Lycett is appearing on the second series of The Celebrity Traitors, which began in October 2026.

=== Radio and podcasts ===
On radio Lycett has been a guest on Scott Mills, Greg James and Nick Grimshaw's programmes on BBC Radio 1 and on Richard Bacon's programme on BBC Radio 5 Live. In August 2011, he wrote and performed the short story "Spooky and the Van" which was broadcast in the Afternoon Reading slot on BBC Radio 4. In August 2013, he made his début on Just a Minute on BBC Radio 4. In September 2016, he took over from Miles Jupp as the host of It's Not What You Know, also on BBC Radio 4. Lycett was known as "the resident news hound" on Josh Widdicombe's XFM radio show, which was broadcast on Saturday (and later Sunday) mornings.

In addition to his appearances on various radio stations, Lycett has featured as a guest on numerous podcasts, including My Dad Wrote a Porno, SoundCheck Podcast, The Comedian's Comedian with Stuart Goldsmith, Richard Herring's Leicester Square Theatre Podcast, and The Harry Hill Show.

From July 2018, there were two series of Joe Lycett's Obsessions on BBC Radio 4.

On 17 August 2019 and 26 October 2019, Lycett stood in for Rylan Clark-Neal on Rylan on Saturday on BBC Radio 2. In December 2019 he returned to Radio 2 covering Sara Cox's drive-time show over the Christmas and New Year period.

In late November 2023, Lycett launched a "fake" podcast, Turdcast, about "celebrities talking shit," and recorded an episode with Gary Lineker. He set up an inflatable toilet dubbed "the Turdis" at Liverpool's Royal Albert Dock for the launch, though this was cancelled seemingly "due to a technical issue," with the alleged waste from the toilet spilling into the Mersey. Lycett later released a statement revealing that "it was fake sewage, from a fake toilet, to promote a fake podcast". He criticised water companies in England for discarding "billions of litres of real sewage" into bodies of water, and announced an hour-long Channel 4 special, Joe Lycett vs Poo (later retitled Joe Lycett vs Sewage), about the water companies.

== Other activities ==
=== Painting ===
Lycett is also a self-taught painter and has had his artwork exhibited. In 2018, a sculpture of his, CHRIS, was accepted by Royal Academy and listed for sale as being worth £12,500,000. CHRIS is still for sale on Lycett's website for the same asking price. His first solo exhibition called Everything Must Go opened on 29 July 2026 at the Birmingham Museum and Art Gallery.

=== Name change ===
In February 2020, in response to a legal dispute between fashion company Hugo Boss and the Swansea-based Boss Brewing, he changed his name by deed poll from "Joe Lycett" to "Hugo Boss". He said that he was drawing attention to the company's use of legal action and cease and desist letters relating to alleged copyright violations against numerous small businesses, including Boss Brewing, for use of the word Boss. In the second series of Joe Lycett's Got Your Back, the comedian launched a fake fashion show celebrating the release of a wrist brace under the name Hugo Boss outside the flagship store of the fashion company with the same name in Regent Street, London. Lycett asserts that Hugo Boss, the company, reported the incident to the Metropolitan Police. In April 2020, he changed his name back to Joe Lycett.

=== Qatar controversy ===
On 13 November 2022, Lycett released a video criticising David Beckham for his multimillion-pound sponsorship deal promoting the 2022 FIFA World Cup in Qatar due to the Gulf state's stance on LGBT rights. In the video, he said he would give £10,000 to charities that support queer people in football if Beckham pulled out of the deal. If Beckham did not pull out of the deal, he promised to shred the money during a livestream on 20 November, just before the World Cup opening ceremony. By 20 November, Beckham had not pulled out of the deal, so Lycett livestreamed himself appearing to shred the money on the website www.benderslikebeckham.com. The next day, Lycett revealed that he had faked the shredding and had already donated £10,000 to LGBTQ+ charities.

In December 2022, against the backdrop of his criticising David Beckham's sponsorship deal, the tabloid newspaper The Sun published an article detailing the fact that Lycett had himself previously performed at Doha, Qatar, in 2015. The paper suggested that Lycett had engaged in "hypocrisy" by performing in Qatar. Lycett responded on Twitter, admitting that he had accepted a fee to perform in Doha adding that he does not "have the perfect hindsight and spotless morality of, to pick a completely random example, The Sun newspaper".

=== Charity work ===
Following comments in early November 2023 from then-Home Secretary Suella Braverman that homelessness was a "lifestyle choice," Lycett used a stock image of pot-pourri to raise over £50,000 for homelessness charity Crisis.

== Recognition and awards ==
Lycett has been described as one of Britain's most popular comedians.

In 2009, Lycett was awarded that year's Chortle Student Comedian of the Year award.

In October 2023, Lycett won The Comedy Award at the 2023 Virgin Atlantic Attitude Awards. In March 2024, Lycett was awarded a BAFTA Television Award for his evening chat show, Late Night Lycett.

== Personal life ==
Lycett frequently refers to his bisexuality and pansexuality in his stand-up routines. In 2021, Lycett was described by Unicorn magazine as "probably the most high-profile pansexual man in Britain today". In a 2015 interview with Attitude magazine, he described how being bisexual "presents its own challenges", when people have "no box to put you in", adding "it just means you fancy people of all genders".

In an October 2024 interview with drag queen Bimini Bon-Boulash, Lycett revealed he had a girlfriend, whom he refers to using the pseudonym "Denise" to "keep her out of the public eye". In October 2024, Lycett announced the birth of his first son with "Denise" at Birmingham Women's Hospital.

Lycett has also spoken openly about his struggles with his mental health. He is known to suffer from anxiety and panic attacks.

Lycett lives in Birmingham and owns a flat in Peckham, south London. In May 2019, Lycett arranged for the Birmingham Lord Mayor Cllr Yvonne Mosquito to officially open his kitchen extension. At first she declined as it was not a public event, but after Lycett raffled four tickets for the event to the public she agreed to attend.

Lycett has been a supporter of West Bromwich Albion since 2012.

He sometimes refers to himself by the moniker "Mummy".

== Filmography ==
=== Television ===
| Year | Title | Role | Notes |
|---|---|---|---|
| 2010 | Laughter Shock | Himself | TV movie |
| 2011 | Epic Win | Himself | August – September 2011 |
| 2011 | Dirty Digest | Himself | November 2011 |
| 2012 | 8 Out of 10 Cats | Himself | Series 14 |
| 2012 | Celebrity Deal Or No Deal | Himself | Appeared on the wings for Sarah Millican's game |
| 2012 | Celebrity Juice | Himself | Series 8 |
| 2012–2014 | Never Mind the Buzzcocks | Himself | Series 26 (2012), Series 28 (2014) |
| 2014–2015 | Virtually Famous | Himself | Series 1 (2014), Series 2 (2015) |
| 2014–2016 | Live at the Apollo | Himself | Series 10 (2014), Series 12 (2016) |
| 2014–2017 | 8 Out of 10 Cats Does Countdown | Himself | |
| 2015 | Alan Davies: As Yet Untitled | Himself | Series 3 (2015) |
| 2015–2020 | Would I Lie To You? | Himself | Series 9 (2015), Series 11 (2018), Series 14 (2020) |
| 2016 | Insert Name Here | Himself | Series 1 (2016) |
| 2016 | Countdown | Himself (Dictionary corner guest) | Series 75 (2016) |
| 2017 | Taskmaster | Himself | Series 4 (2017) |
| 2017–present | QI | Himself | Series O (1 episode), Series P (2 episodes), Series Q (2 episodes), Series R (2 episodes) |
| 2018 | Roast Battle | Himself | Series 1 (2018) |
| 2018 | The Time It Takes | Himself | Series 1 (2018) |
| 2019–2021 | The Great British Sewing Bee | Presenter | Series 5 – Series 7 |
| 2019–present | Joe Lycett's Got Your Back | Presenter (Note: Series 1 as Joe Lycett and Series 2 as both Hugo Boss and Joe Lycett) | Series 1 (2019), Series 2 (2020), Series 3 (2021) |
| 2019, 2020 | The Big Fat Quiz | Himself | The Big Fat Quiz of Everything (2019 Special), The Big Fat Quiz of the Decade (2020) |
| 2020 | Dragon's Den | Presenter | Dragons' Den: Best Ever Pitches: The Inventions, Ep1 - 6 |
| 2021 | Birdgirl | Graham | Voice acting |
| 2021 | Have I Got News for You | Himself (Panellist) | Series 61, Episode 4 (30 April 2021) |
| 2021 | Joe Lycett vs the Oil Giant | Himself (Presenter) | Air date: 24 October 2021 |
| 2021–present | Travel Man | Himself (Presenter) | Succeeded Richard Ayoade as presenter from series 10 |
| 2022 | Joe Lycett's Big Pride Party | Himself (Presenter) | Air date: 3 July 2022 |
| 2022 | Joe Lycett: Summer Exhibitionist | Himself (Presenter) | Air date: 23 July 2022 |
| 2022 | The Sandman | The Tabby Kitten | Voice acting |
| 2022 | Sunday with Laura Kuenssberg | Himself (Panellist) | Air date: 4 September 2022 |
| 2023–present | Late Night Lycett | Host | Series 1 (2023); Series 2 aired (2024) |
| 2024 | Joe Lycett vs Sewage | Himself (Presenter) | Air date: 20 February 2024 |
| 2024 | Sky Arts Awards | Himself (Host) | Air date: 17 September 2024 |
| 2025 | Joe Lycett's United States of Birmingham | Himself (Presenter) | Upcoming three-part series |
| 2025 | LOL: Last One Laughing UK | Himself | Series 1 Contestant |
| 2026 | Celebrity Deal or No Deal | Contestant | |
| 2026 | The Lycett Arms | Host | Six-part series |
| 2026 | The Celebrity Traitors | Contestant | Series 2 Contestant |

=== Theatre ===
| Year | Title | Role | Venue | Notes |
|---|---|---|---|---|
| 2025 | Inside No. 9 Stage/Fright | Himself - guest star | The Alexandra, Birmingham | One-night-only |
| 2026 | White Rabbit Red Rabbit | Performer | Duchess Theatre | One-night-only |

== Stand-up DVDs ==
| Title | Release date | BBFC rating |
|---|---|---|
| Joe Lycett: That's The Way A-Ha A-Ha, Joe Lycett – Live | 21 November 2016 | 15 |
| Joe Lycett: I'm About to Lose Control And I Think Joe Lycett – Live | 26 November 2018 | 15 |
| Joe Lycett: More, More, More! / How Do You Lycett? - Live | 11 November 2022 | No Rating |

== Bibliography ==
| Title | Release date |
|---|---|
| Parsnips, Buttered | 20 October 2016 |
| Joe Lycett's Art Hole | 21 September 2024 |
