= Guz Khan =

British actor and comedian (born 1986)

- غلام دستگیر خان
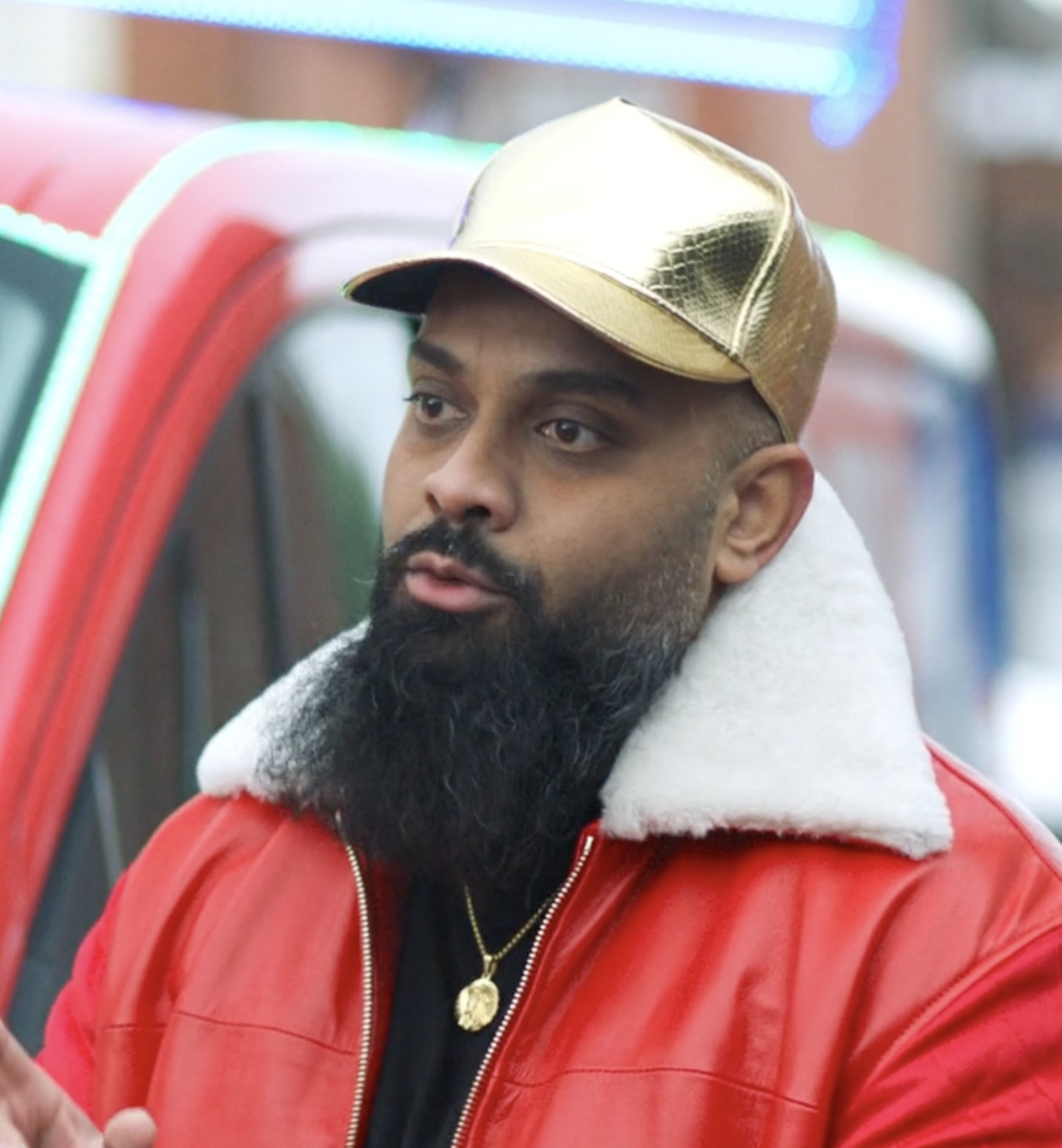
- Khan in 2022
- Born: Ghulam Dastgir Khan; 24 January 1986 (age 40); Coventry, West Midlands, England
- Other name: Guzzy Bear
- Education: Coventry University (BA)
- Occupations: Comedian; writer; actor; television director; television producer
- Years active: 2014–present
- Agent: Curtis Brown
- Known for: Man Like Mobeen
- Children: Three
- Website: guzkhan.com

Ghulam Dastgir Khan (Urdu, Punjabi: غلام دستگیر خان; born 24 January 1986), also known as Guz Khan, is a British comedian and actor. His TV appearances include Man Like Mobeen, Taskmaster (series 12), Our Flag Means Death (season 1) and stand-up performances on Live at the Apollo.

== Early life ==
Khan was born on 24 January 1986 in Coventry, in the West Midlands county of England to Pakistani immigrants. Khan's parents are Punjabi Muslims who had emigrated to the United Kingdom in the 1980s. He has two sisters who are ten and eleven years older than him. His father died when he was three.

Khan grew up on a housing estate in Hillfields, a suburb of Coventry, and attended Stoke Park School. He graduated from Coventry University with a Bachelor of Arts degree, and went on to teach Humanities at Grace Academy.

== Career ==
=== Breakthrough ===
Khan uploaded his first video to Facebook in 2014; in June of that year, he first performed on stage, opening for Aamer Rahman at Birmingham Repertory Theatre. His second time on stage was at a comedy evening at the Library of Birmingham BBC Asian Network organised for Comic Relief, with Citizen Khan. Khan performed under the stage name "Guzzy Bear".

In June 2015, whilst performing as his character Mobeen, a Muslim living in Small Heath, Khan made a video called "Pakisaurus", expressing mock outrage at the lead character in the film Jurassic World shouting the line "the Pachys are out of containment" (an abbreviation of Pachycephalosaurus), observing it to be a homophone of Paki, a racial slur for people of South Asian descent. During the video, Khan also discovers Pakisaurus is the name of a real dinosaur from Pakistan. In six days, the video was watched over 340,000 times on YouTube, and it has also received over 700,000 views on Facebook. Khan's hashtag on Twitter, #BoycottJurassicWorld gained attention, After the Birmingham Mail publicised the story, Khan was interviewed by radio stations in the United States and Indonesia.

=== Stand-up comedy ===
In December 2015, Khan performed at BBC Asian Network's Big Comedy Night in Birmingham, a special comedy night celebrating 50 years of Asian programmes on the BBC.

He has also performed on the BBC2 stand-up show Live at the Apollo, in an episode aired on 31 December 2017, hosted by the comedian Henning Wehn.

Critics have celebrated Khan for his distinctive on-stage style, described as "his fusion of British-urban-Islamic clothing and personal accessories."

=== Television ===
In June 2015, Khan made a short film Roadman Ramadan as part of the British Muslim Comedy series, five short films by Muslim comedians commissioned by the BBC to be released on BBC iPlayer. Khan's sketch was a guide to Ramadan, the Islamic month of fasting during daylight hours, which sees Khan's character Mobeen guide his newly converted friend Trev through his first Ramadan.

In July 2015, Khan gave up his job as a school teacher to pursue a career in comedy after his YouTube clips went viral. In November, he featured in an episode of comedy web series Corner Shop Show. In 2016, he went on to play the rambunctious baggage handler Mo Khan in Borderline.

In December 2017, Khan's four-part BBC comedy series Man Like Mobeen was released on BBC iPlayer. Four more series of the show have been produced, which were released on BBC iPlayer in 2019, 2020, 2023 and 2025.

In March 2019, Khan appeared as a guest on Hypothetical.

In 2020, he appeared in Four Weddings And a Funeral, a miniseries created by Mindy Kaling that is a re-imagining of the original film.

In September 2021, Khan appeared on the twelfth series of Taskmaster.

In December 2021, Khan appeared as Bonzo in Beauty and the Beast: A Pantomime for Comic Relief, originally broadcast on BBC Two on Sunday 21 December.

In February 2022, Khan narrated the Peaky Blinders Ultimate Recap on BBC One.

In March 2022, Khan appeared in the HBO Max comedy pirate series Our Flag Means Death, where he played Ivan, a member of Blackbeard's crew. Khan was the only main actor dropped ahead of the second season of the show. Responding to the decision, he tweeted: "This is the industry sometimes. They might be choosing a different direction creatively, maybe it's financial decision, maybe they weren't feeling your boy."

In March 2024, Khan appeared in the Netflix show The Gentlemen, where he played Chucky "The Cobra" Kubra, an experienced money launderer.

In March 2026, Khan appeared in the Amazon Prime series Bait, where he places Zulfy.

=== Commercial endorsements ===
In June 2019, Khan appeared in an advert for Walkers crisps alongside the Spice Girls, playing Dev, the group's biggest fan.

In February 2020, Uber Eats launched a UK-wide brand campaign starring Khan as a charismatic courier spreading positivity.

=== Film ===
In 2017, Khan appeared as Rocky in the romantic comedy film Finding Fatimah.

In 2019, Khan appeared alongside Idris Elba in the Netflix comedy show Turn Up Charlie which premiered on 15 March 2019.

In 2022, Khan appeared in the main cast of the film The Bubble, playing actor Howie Frangopolous.

In 2024, Khan played the voice of Dasher the reindeer in the Netflix animated film That Christmas which was released on 4 December 2024.

== Political views ==
Khan supported Labour Party leader Jeremy Corbyn in the 2019 UK General Election, encouraging people to vote Labour. He is a supporter of the Palestinian cause.

== Personal life ==
Khan is a Muslim. He lives with his wife and five children in the West Midlands. Khan is a supporter of Manchester United F.C.

== Filmography ==
=== Film ===
Year	Title	Role
2017	Finding Fatimah	Rocky
2018	Walk Like a Panther	Terry Khan
2021	Army of Thieves	Rolph
2022	The Bubble	Howard "Howie" Frangopolous
2024	How to Date Billy Walsh	Mr. Atkins
2024	That Christmas	Dasher (voice)
TBA	Girl Group	TBA

=== Television ===
Year	Title	Role	Notes
2015	Corner Shop Show		Episode: "The Beginning of the End"
2015	Half My Faith, All My Struggle	Himself	2 episodes
2015	Sky Comedy Christmas Shorts	Abid	Episode: "Tez Ilyas' Christmas"
2016; 2017	Drunk History	Marshall Boucicault/ Henry's Manservant	2 episodes
2016–2017	Borderline	Mo Khan	Recurring cast
2016–2017	Zapped	Skylark	Recurring cast
2016	Doctors	Guzzy Bear	Episode: "Mother's Ruin"
2016	BBC Comedy Feeds	Mobeen	Episode: "Man Like Mobeen", also writer
2016	Dropperz	Big Gib	Episode: "Bunny's Bitten It"
2016	Halloween Comedy Shorts		Episode: "Guz Khan's Horror: Frightbusters"
2016	The Apprentice: You're Fired	Himself	Episode: "Cycling Crowdfunding"
2017	Celebrity Eggheads	Himself	Series 7, episode 17
2017	Life Lessons	Himself	Episode: "The Worst Things About Being a Teacher"
2017	Loaded	Tech Head	Episode: "The Expo"
2017–2025	Man Like Mobeen	Mobeen	Main role, also creator
2017; 2019	Live at the Apollo	Himself	2 episodes
2018	Sunday Brunch	Himself	3 episodes
2018	The Chris Ramsey Show	Himself	Series 2, episode 5
2019	Curfew	Cheese	Main cast
2019	Turn Up Charlie	Del	Recurring cast
2019	The Tez O'Clock Show	Himself	2 episodes
2019	Four Weddings and a Funeral	Basheer	Main cast
2019–2022	Hypothetical	Himself	4 episodes
2019–2020	The Big Narstie Show	Himself	2 episodes
2019–2021	There's Something About Movies	Himself	6 episodes
2019; 2023	A League of Their Own	Himself	2 episodes
2019; 2022	Would I Lie to You?	Himself	2 episodes
2020–2025	The Last Leg	Himself	11 episodes
2020; 2025	The One Show	Himself	2 episodes
2020	The Russell Howard Hour	Himself	14 episodes
2020	Russell Howard's Home Time	Himself	Episode: "Lockdown Life"
2020	Joe Lycett's Got Your Back	Himself	Episode: "Guz Khan, Fly Tippers and Recycling Shame"
2020	Big Zuu's Big Eats	Himself	Episode: "Guz Khan"
2020	Comedy Game Night	Himself	Main cast, team captain
2020	Frankie Boyle's New World Order	Himself	Series 4, episode 1
2020	Spitting Image	Various (voice)	3 episodes
2020	Cinderella: A Comic Relief Pantomime for Christmas	Buttons	TV special
2021–2022	The Adventures of Paddington	Baz	50 episodes
2021	Alan Davies: As Yet Untitled	Himself	Episode: "The Accuracy of a Pigeon"
2021	Taskmaster	Himself	Main cast– series 12
2021	The Ranganation	Himself	Series 4, episode 3
2021	The Jonathan Ross Show	Himself	Season 18, episode 4
2021	One Night in...	Himself	Episode: "London Zoo"
2021	Beauty and the Beast: A Comic Relief Pantomime for Christmas	Bonzo	TV movie
2021	The Big Fat Quiz of the Year	Himself	TV special
2021; 2023; 2025	BBC New Comedy Awards	Himself	3 episodes, hosted 2025 final
2022	Our Flag Means Death	Ivan	Main cast
2022	Comic Relief: Red Nose Day	Himself	TV movie
2022	Richard Hammond's Brain Reaction	Himself	Episode 4
2022	The Chris & Rosie Ramsey Show	Himself	Series 1, episode 5
2022	Trip Hazard	Himself	Episode: "Blackpool"
2022	Mel Giedroyc: Unforgivable	Himself	Series 3, episode 4
2022	The Unofficial Science of Home Alone	Himself	TV special
2022; 2024	QI	Himself	3 episodes
2022–2023	Celebrity Gogglebox	Himself	3 episodes
2022–2023	The Lateish Show with Mo Gilligan	Himself	2 episodes
2022; 2025	Blankety Blank	Himself	2 episodes
2023	The John Bishop Show	Himself	Series 2, episode 2
2023	Fantasy Football League	Himself	3 episodes
2023	Wonders of the World I Can't See	Himself	Episode: "Jordan"
2023	Rhod Gilbert's Growing Pains	Himself	Series 5, episode 1
2023	The Great British Bake Off: An Extra Slice	Himself	Series 10, episode: "Bread Week"
2023	Outsiders	Himself	Main cast
2023	My Super-Rich Holiday	Himself	With Eddie Kadi
2023	Late Night Lycett	Himself	Episode: "Christmas Special"
2023	Sports Funniest 2023 with Greg James	Himself	TV special
2023–2024	CBeebies Bedtime Story	Himself	3 episodes
2023; 2025	Have I Got News for You	Himself	2 episodes
2023–present	Digman!	Zane Troy (voice)	Main cast
2024	The Gentlemen	Chucky	Episode: "All Eventualities"
2024	The Completely Made-Up Adventures of Dick Turpin	Gow	Episode: "Run Wilde"
2024	The Weakest Link	Himself	Series 3, episode 15
2024	Battle in the Box	Himself	Episode: "Guz Khan & Rachel Parris v Amy Gledhill & Josh Pugh"
2024	The Wheel	Himself	Series 5, episode 7
2025	8 Out of 10 Cats Does Countdown	Himself	3 episodes
2025	Iain Stirling's Roast the Internet	Himself	Series 1, episode 2
2025	Together for Palestine	Himself	TV special
2025	Stuffed	Arslan Farooqi	TV movie, also executive producer
2026	Guz Khan’s Custom Cars	Host	TV series
2026	Bait	Zulfi	Regular role
2026	Celebrity Sabotage	Himself	1 episode
TBA	Guz Does...MMA (W/T)	Himself	Documentary

== Accolades ==
Year	Award	Category	Title	Result
2020	Broadcast Digital Awards	Best Comedy Programme	Man Like Mobeen	Won
2020	British Academy Television Awards	Best Male Comedy Performance	Man Like Mobeen	Nominated
2021	British Academy Television Awards	Best Male Comedy Performance	Man Like Mobeen	Nominated
2021	British Academy Television Awards	Scripted Comedy	Man Like Mobeen	Nominated
2022	Peabody Awards	Entertainment	Our Flag Means Death	Nominated
