= Trip Hazard: My Great British Adventure =

British TV travel documentary series

- Genre: Comedy; Travel documentary
- Created by: Rosie Jones
- Presented by: Rosie Jones
- Starring: Scarlett Moffatt; Joe Wilkinson; Jamali Maddix; Jenny Eclair
- Narrated by: Olivia Colman (series 1); Joanna Lumley (series 2)
- Composer: Sean Smith
- Country of origin: United Kingdom
- Original language: English
- No. of series: 2
- No. of episodes: 9 (series 1: 4 episodes; series 2: 5 episodes)

Production
- Executive producer: Jody Smith
- Producers: Kerry Brandon; Dionne Farley; Lindsey Harris; Sara Huxley; Allie Nicholls; Tom Payne; Mia Riches; Alex Wilson
- Running time: 23 minutes
- Production company: Studio 71

Original release
- Network: Channel 4
- Release: 9 March 2021 – 20 September 2022

Trip Hazard: My Great British Adventure is a travel documentary hosted by comedian Rosie Jones for Channel 4 in 2021. The concept of the show is that Jones travels to various locations in the UK alongside a guest star, with the first series of four episodes aired on 9 March 2021.

The guest stars and locations are Scarlett Moffatt (the Lake District), Joe Wilkinson (Whitby), Jamali Maddix (Norwich), and Jenny Eclair (Anglesey).

The show is narrated by Olivia Colman. Jones described the concept of the show as travelling to places that "aren’t necessarily holiday locations [...] and [yet] finding the best out of that place. It’s full of adventure and positivity, and it’s making the most of this amazing, beautiful country [United Kingdom] we live in."

In March 2022, Trip Hazard was renewed for a second series by Channel 4 and premiered on 23 August 2022.

== Episodes ==
=== Series 1 (2021) ===
No. overall	No. in series	Title	Directed by	Written by	Original release date
1	1	"The Lake District"	Tom Levinge	James Kettle	9 March 2021
Rosie Jones travels to the Lake District with Scarlett Moffatt. They visit Wordsworth House, Kendal Castle, and ride on a steam engine, as well as meeting the Mayor of Kendal, Alvin Finch.
2	2	"Whitby"	Tom Levinge	James Kettle	9 March 2021
Rosie Jones travels to Whitby with Joe Wilkinson. They visit the Yorkshire Jurassic Coast, play crazy golf, participate in a Goth band, and go on a sea fishing trip on a trawler as well as sampling award-winning fish and chips.
3	3	"Norwich"	Tom Levinge	James Kettle	12 April 2021
Rosie Jones travels to Norwich with Jamali Maddix. They visit Norwich Cathedral, and participate in molly dancing and pro wrestling.
4	4	"Anglesey"	Tom Levinge	James Kettle	12 April 2021
Rosie Jones travels to Anglesey with Jenny Eclair. They go sheep herding, go on the world's fastest zip line over a disused area of the Penrhyn Quarry, and are taught beach survival skills.

=== Series 2 (2022) ===
No. overall	No. in series	Title	Directed by	Written by	Original release date
5	1	"Moray"	Tom Levinge	Rosie Jones & Nicola Dempsey	23 August 2022
Rosie Jones travels to Moray with AJ Odudu. They row across Loch Morlich, try clay pigeon shooting, sample some whisky at a distillery, visit an ecovillage and climb Cairn Gorm.
6	2	"Blackpool"	Tom Levinge	Rosie Jones & Nicola Dempsey	30 August 2022
Rosie Jones travels to Blackpool with Guz Khan. They visit a fortune teller, Rosie rides The Big One - the tallest roller coaster in the United Kingdom, they try indoor skydiving, have a Hip hop dance lesson, take part in a Ballroom dancing competition, Rosie auditions for a tribute act, and Rosie does the UK's highest skydive.
7	3	"Bradford"	Tom Levinge	Rosie Jones & Nicola Dempsey	6 September 2022
Rosie Jones travels to Bradford with Tom Rosenthal. They have a Rap lesson, attempt an eating challenge and they visit Youth Cutz barbers, where men can go for a haircut and talk about their mental health problems. Rosie and Tom have a race in sailing boats, try Ice skating and they have a rap battle.
8	4	"Northamptonshire"	Tom Levinge	Rosie Jones & Nicola Dempsey	13 September 2022
Rosie Jones travels to Northamptonshire with Lady Leshurr. They have a flight in a microlight, experience Aerial yoga, have a Highland dance lesson, learn how to do doughnuts, milk a goat, make goat ice cream, and abseil down Northampton's Lift Tower.
9	5	"Pembrokeshire"	Tom Levinge	Rosie Jones & Nicola Dempsey	20 September 2022
Rosie Jones travels to Pembrokeshire with Fay Ripley. Rosie has a cold water swim, they go horseback riding, make a lovespoon, feed baby crocodiles, ghost hunt at Carew Castle, and Rosie tries coasteering.

== Production information ==
Rosie Jones said of the decision to have Olivia Colman narrate the show:

The producer said ‘Right, imagine no one’s off limits, who do you want?’ And I said Olivia. He said ‘We’re not going to get her.’ She’s just a hero and I love her energy and her humour so much, so I just said, ‘Ask her, even if it’s a no email, I will literally frame that no email!’ But she came back and she said ‘I love Rosie, I’m a big fan, I’ll do it.’ Honestly, I’ve just taken a permanent residency on cloud nine because of that. And when you watch it, hearing her funny, beautiful and slightly judging voice of me, is just brilliant. For her to be a massive part of the show is just mind-blowing.

— Rosie Jones,
