= Rosie Jones =

British comedian and actress (born 1990)

- Jones in 2024
- Born: Rosie Luisa Jones; 24 June 1990 (age 36); Bridlington, East Riding of Yorkshire, England
- Education: University of Huddersfield (BA)
- Occupations: Comedian, actress, writer
- Years active: 2016–present
- Website: rosiejonescomedy.com

Rosie Luisa Jones (born 24 June 1990) is a British comedian, writer and actress. After starting her career as a writer on panel shows, she went on to appear as a guest on The Last Leg, 8 Out of 10 Cats, 8 Out of 10 Cats Does Countdown, QI, Would I Lie to You?, Hypothetical, and Taskmaster. She attended the 2020 Summer Paralympics in Tokyo as a roving reporter for The Last Leg.

Jones has performed stand-up comedy at the Edinburgh Festival Fringe, incorporating her cerebral palsy into her comedic style. In 2018 she was featured on Edinburgh Nights. She has also hosted the documentary Am I a R*tard?, the series Trip Hazard: My Great British Adventure, and written an episode of Sex Education. With Helen Bauer, she hosts the podcast Daddy Look at Me.

As an actress, she appeared in six episodes of Casualty in 2021 and 2022, and starred in the 2025 sitcom Pushers, which she also co-created. Jones authored a children's book, The Amazing Edie Eckhart, about an 11-year-old girl with cerebral palsy, and a sequel, The Big Trip.

== Early life ==
Jones grew up in Bridlington, East Riding of Yorkshire and went to Headlands School. Her parents are teachers.

== Career ==
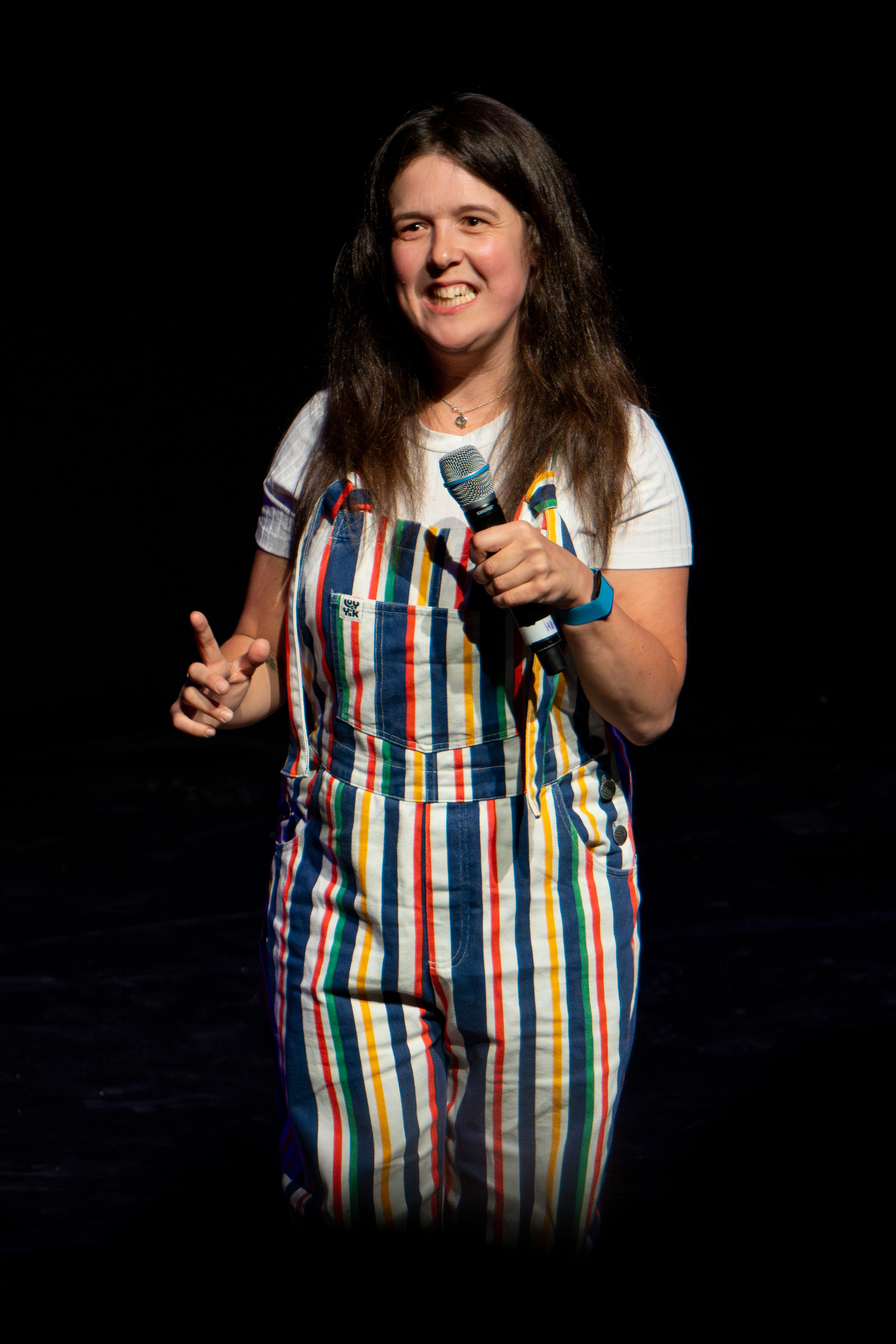
Jones in 2024

=== Comedy writing ===
In 2011, following her graduation with a B.A. in English Language and Creative Writing from the University of Huddersfield, Jones was hired for a year as a junior researcher for Objective Media Group as part of a disability scheme at Channel 4. She was unemployed for a few years following this. In January 2015, she began a screenwriting class at the National Film and Television School.

Jones reached the final of the 2016 Funny Women Awards. She began writing for The Last Leg during their coverage of the 2016 Summer Olympics. She also wrote for Harry Hill's Alien Fun Capsule, Would I Lie to You? and 8 Out of 10 Cats Does Countdown.

Alongside series creator Laurie Nunn, Jones co-wrote episode four of the second season of the Netflix comedy-drama Sex Education, released in January 2020.

=== Television ===
Jones appeared in 2 episodes of Silent Witness in 2018. Jones has been a panellist in episodes of 8 Out of 10 Cats and The Last Leg. In 2019, she was a guest on Hypothetical and 8 Out of 10 Cats Does Countdown. She also appeared on an episode of Joe Lycett's Got Your Back.

Jones has also appeared on BBC Radio 4's The News Quiz, the Channel 4 online programme The Last Leg: The Correspondents, the BBC Three series "Things Not to Say", BBC Radio 4's Fred at the Stand and BBC web series Period Dramas. In 2021, she appeared in the QI episode "Sideshows, Stunts and Scavenger Hunts". She participated in Celebrity Mastermind in 2023.

Jones appeared as a panellist on BBC One's political debate programme Question Time twice, first on 12 November 2020. She trended on Twitter each time due to the harassment directed towards her.

In May 2021, she starred in her own Channel 4 series, Trip Hazard: My Great British Adventure. Filmed during the COVID-19 pandemic, it features Jones visiting a number of UK tourist destinations, joined by other celebrities. In March 2022, a second series of five hour-long episodes was commissioned; it premiered on 23 August 2022. The programme was nominated for a BAFTA.

Jones presented the 2023 documentary Rosie Jones: Am I a R*tard? [sic], which is about online hate speech against disabled people. She reads messages written about her, explores the emotional effect of harassment, the inaction by social media companies and the motivations behind people who send these messages. The use of the slur retard received widespread criticism and led to the withdrawal of some contributors.

In March 2022, Channel 4 transmitted Dine Hard, a five-part cooking show and chat show that Jones presented.

She has had a number of acting roles, appearing on Silent Witness in 2018. In 2020, she guest starred in an episode of the third series of the BBC drama Shakespeare & Hathaway: Private Investigators. In August 2023, it was announced that Jones would play the lead role of Disability Benefits, an upcoming Channel 4 comedy series. In January 2024, she starred in an episode of Call the Midwife.

In early 2024, she hosted the comedy game show Out of Order, which aired on Comedy Central.

In May 2024, it was announced that Jones would appear as a contestant in the eighteenth series of Taskmaster, alongside Andy Zaltzman, Babatunde Aléshé, Emma Sidi, and Jack Dee. She finished in last place.

In 2025, an expansion of Disability Benefits into a six-part sitcom Pushers was given an airdate of 19 June 2025 by Channel 4. For her performance in the series, Jones was nominated for the British Academy Television Award for Best Female Comedy Performance in 2026.

=== Stand-up comedy ===
Jones first performed stand-up comedy without preparation at a friend's comedy night.

In 2017, she performed "Inspiration" at the Edinburgh Festival Fringe. The show was 35 minutes long and contained jokes about her visit to the 2016 Summer Paralympics, using disabled toilets, and commentary on the words "disabled" and "spastic". It received 3.5 stars in Chortle and three stars in The List.

In 2018, Jones's Edinburgh Festival Fringe show was titled "Fifteen Minutes". She talks about a hypothetical "able-bodied Rosie" and discusses a sexual fantasy about Ryan Gosling. She and her routine were featured in Edinburgh Nights, a BBC show about the Fringe presented by Nish Kumar. "Fifteen Minutes" received five stars in The Arts Desk and four stars in iNews, Chortle, The Scotsman and Broadway World. It was listed by Evening Standard as one of the ten "best comedy shows to see" at the festival.

Jones performed at the Greenwich Comedy Festival in 2018. In 2019, she performed at Spectacular, a one-off event for Comic Relief, and appeared at the 2019 Women of the World Festival. She has also been a support act for Nish Kumar.

Jones began her first solo tour, Triple Threat, in 2023.

=== Other work ===
In June 2019, Jones launched a podcast alongside the fellow comedian Helen Bauer, titled Daddy Look at Me. It features Bauer, Jones and a guest discussing their childhoods and what they did in order to get attention in their youth.

In 2021, Jones authored a children's novel, The Amazing Edie Eckhart. The titular character, an 11-year-old girl with cerebral palsy, deals with the pressure of entering secondary school and becoming distant from her lifelong friend and support Charlie. Jones wrote a sequel novel, The Big Trip, which was published on 18 August 2022.

== Comedic style ==
Jones has ataxic cerebral palsy; she incorporates her slow speech pattern into her comedy, constructing jokes to subvert the punchline that audiences expect. For instance, she has used the opening line "As you can tell from my voice, I suffer from being northern." She unexpectedly refers to previous jokes later in her performances, a trait which one critic describes as "clinically planned".

She describes her style as "cheeky", commenting that she makes jokes that able-bodied people could not. Her stand-up routines relate to disability and sexuality, and have been described as dark comedy (meaning black comedy).

In 2019, Jones received mixed reception for a joke she made on The Last Leg in which she said that as a 16-year-old, environmental activist Greta Thunberg should only be concerned with "drinking Lambrini and getting fingered."

Jones said she experiences impostor syndrome, having grown up seeing comedians as fast-spoken straight white males. She has also said that she has used jokes as a coping mechanism.

== Personal life ==
Jones is lesbian. On the BBC Sounds podcast Duvet Days, she said "Growing up, there was nobody in TV or radio that looked like me – that sounded like me. There was Francesca Martinez in Grange Hill, but that was the only person really. And also my sexuality came into that, like when there was a disabled person they were very much the victim and they didn't have a sexuality, they were very much the stock disabled person. That meant growing up, I didn't accept my sexuality because I thought I'm not gay and disabled."

Jones has spoken on the rights of disabled people, describing bullying that she has experienced and difficulties in her daily life. She has expressed concerns over the particular vulnerability of disabled people during the COVID-19 pandemic, and the way emphasis on the virus affecting people with pre-existing conditions has led to disabled people being coded as "second class citizens". During an interview with The Guardian, Jones commented: "I would love in the next few years to see more disabled comedians, directors, producers, commissioners. I hope disabled people can see me on TV and think: if she can do it, I can do it." She receives social media abuse each time she appears on television.

In a 2023 interview with i, Jones said she was mugged five times in the course of two years while walking alone, targeted due to her disability. She said she has been regularly rejected by taxi services when drivers assumed her to be drunk. Online, much of the abuse she faces is unwanted sexual comments.

Jones began therapy during the production of Am I a R*tard?. She said she would recommend it to "literally anyone". Therapy allowed her to believe that she was not responsible for facing discrimination and accept the statement: "sometimes I am a victim".
