= Kate Nash discography =

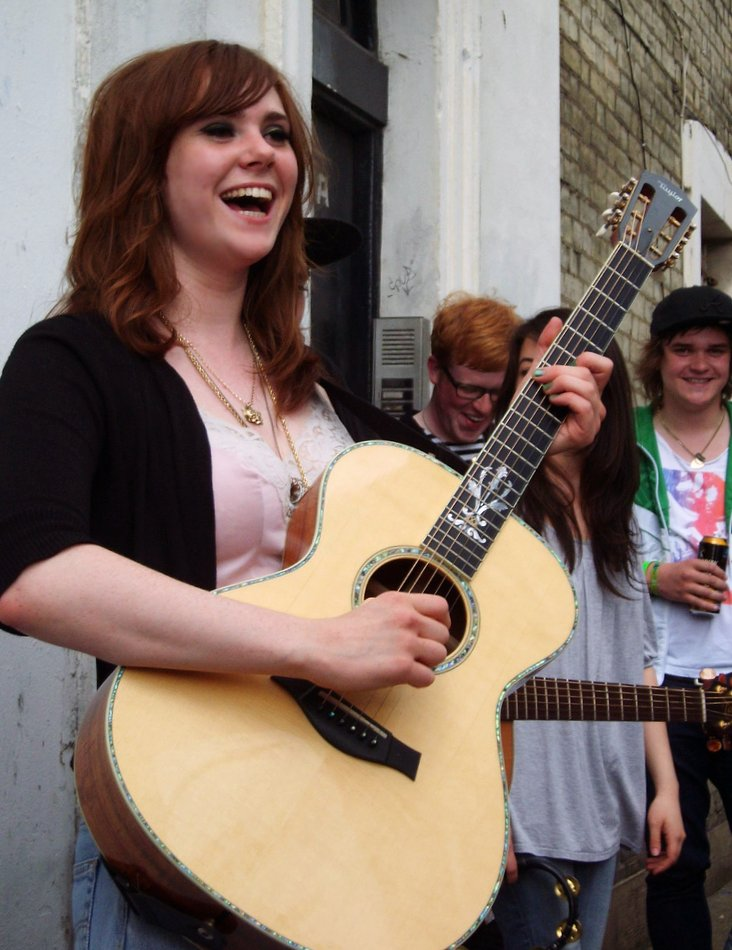
- Nash performing in 2007
- Studio albums: 5
- Singles: 22
- Music videos: 22

The discography of British singer-songwriter and musician Kate Nash consists of five studio albums, twenty-two singles and twenty-five music videos. Her debut album, Made of Bricks, charted at number one in the United Kingdom and achieved platinum status. The album garnered success across Europe and achieved gold status in Germany, as well as moderate success in the United States and Australia. It spawned four singles, UK number 2 "Foundations", "Mouthwash", "Pumpkin Soup" and "Merry Happy".

Nash released her riot grrrl- and doo-wop-inspired second studio album, My Best Friend Is You, in 2010. It charted at number eight in the UK and achieved success in both Europe and the United States, but not to the same extent as her previous album. The record spawned three singles and two promotional singles, including Nash's second-highest-charting song "Do Wah Doo" and "Kiss That Grrrl". Her third album, Girl Talk, was self-released in 2013. After a string of single releases and an EP, Agenda, released for Record Store Day, Nash preceded the release of her fourth studio album Yesterday Was Forever with the single "Drink About You".

== Studio albums ==
List of studio albums, with selected chart positions and certifications
Title	Album details	Peak chart positions									Certifications
Title	Album details	UK	AUS	AUT	BEL (FL)	GER	IRL	NL	SWI	US	Certifications
Made of Bricks	Released: 6 August 2007 (UK); Labels: Fiction, Polydor; Formats: CD, DD, LP	1	67	51	20	38	8	41	39	36	BPI: 2× Platinum
My Best Friend Is You	Released: 19 April 2010 (UK); Labels: Fiction, Polydor; Formats: CD, DD, LP	8	50	14	35	6	26	47	23	62	
Girl Talk	Released: 4 March 2013 (UK); Label: Have 10P; Formats: CD, DD, LP	85	—	71	185	55	61	—	—	123	
Yesterday Was Forever	Released: 30 March 2018; Label: Grrrl Gang; Formats: CD, DD, LP, vinyl	—	—	—	—	—	—	—	—	—	
9 Sad Symphonies	Released: 21 June 2024; Label: Kill Rock Stars; Formats: CD, DD, LP, vinyl	78	—	—	—	—	—	—	—	—	
"—" denotes items which were not released in that country or failed to chart

== Extended plays ==
List of extended plays
Title	EP details
iTunes Festival: London 2010	Released: 6 July 2010 (UK); Label: Polydor; Format: Digital download
Death Proof	Released: 19 November 2012 (UK); Label: Have 10P; Formats: Digital download, LP
Have Faith With Kate Nash This Christmas	Released: 26 November 2013; Label: Have 10P; Formats: Digital download
Agenda	Released: 21 April 2017; Label: Girl Gang; Formats: Digital download, vinyl

== Singles ==
List of singles, with selected chart positions, showing year released and album name
Title	Year	Peak chart positions									Certifications	Album
Title	Year	UK	AUS	AUT	BEL (FL)	GER	IRE	NL	SWI	US Bub.	Certifications	Album
"Caroline's a Victim"	2007	151	—	—	—	—	—	—	—	—		Non-album single
"Foundations"	2007	2	59	38	12	37	12	49	48	16	BPI: 3× Platinum	Made of Bricks
"Mouthwash"	2007	23	—	—	— (Note: "Mouthwash" did not enter the Ultratop 50, but peaked at number 6 on the Flemish Ultratip chart.)	—	—	—	—	—		Made of Bricks
"Pumpkin Soup"	2007	23	93	72	— (Note: "Pumpkin Soup" did not enter the Ultratop 50, but peaked at number 23 on the Flemish Ultratip chart.)	83	40	—	—	—		Made of Bricks
"Merry Happy"	2008	116	—	—	—	—	—	—	—	12		Made of Bricks
"Do-Wah-Doo"	2010	15	—	55	— (Note: "Do-Wah-Doo" did not enter the Ultratop 50, but peaked at number 8 on the Flemish Ultratip chart.)	36	—	—	—	—		My Best Friend Is You
"Kiss That Grrrl"	2010	—	—	—	—	—	—	—	—	—		My Best Friend Is You
"Later On"	2010	—	—	—	—	—	—	—	—	—		My Best Friend Is You
"3AM"	2013	—	—	—	—	—	—	—	—	—		Girl Talk
"OMyGod!"	2013	—	—	—	—	—	—	—	—	—		Girl Talk
"Fri-End?"	2013	—	—	—	—	—	—	—	—	—		Girl Talk
"Sister"	2014	—	—	—	—	—	—	—	—	—		Girl Talk
"Good Summer"	2016	—	—	—	—	—	—	—	—	—		Non-album single
"My Little Alien"	2016	—	—	—	—	—	—	—	—	—		Yesterday Was Forever
"Agenda"	2017	—	—	—	—	—	—	—	—	—		Agenda EP
"Call Me"	2017	—	—	—	—	—	—	—	—	—		Yesterday Was Forever
"Drink About You"	2018	—	—	—	—	—	—	—	—	—		Yesterday Was Forever
"Life in Pink"	2018	—	—	—	—	—	—	—	—	—		Yesterday Was Forever
"Hate You"	2018	—	—	—	—	—	—	—	—	—		Yesterday Was Forever
"Trash"	2019	—	—	—	—	—	—	—	—	—		Non-album single
"Body Heat"	2019	—	—	—	—	—	—	—	—	—		Yesterday Was Forever
"Bad Lieutenant"	2019	—	—	—	—	—	—	—	—	—		Non-album single
"Misery"	2021	—	—	—	—	—	—	—	—	—		9 Sad Symphonies
"Horsie"	2021	—	—	—	—	—	—	—	—	—		9 Sad Symphonies
"Imperfect"	2022	—	—	—	—	—	—	—	—	—		9 Sad Symphonies
"Wasteman"	2022	—	—	—	—	—	—	—	—	—		9 Sad Symphonies
"Change"	2024	—	—	—	—	—	—	—	—	—		Non-album single
"Millions of Heartbeats"	2024	—	—	—	—	—	—	—	—	—		9 Sad Symphonies
"Germ"	2025	100	—	—	—	—	—	—	—	—		Non-album single
"Famine"	2026	—	—	—	—	—	—	—	—	—		Cailín
"Spilt Milk"	2026	—	—	—	—	—	—	—	—	—		Cailín
"—" denotes items which were not released in that country or failed to chart

== Other charted songs ==
List of other charted songs, with selected chart positions, showing year released and album name
Title	Year	Peak chart positions	Album
Title	Year	UK	Album
"Birds"	2007	142	Made of Bricks
"We Get On"	2007	177	Made of Bricks
"Skeleton Song"	2007	138	Made of Bricks
"Nicest Thing"	2007	155	Made of Bricks
"A Is for Asthma"	2007	190	Made of Bricks

== Featured songs ==
- 2008: "I Wish" (Ironik featuring Kate Nash)
- 2008: "Me and My Microphone" (Kano featuring Kate Nash)
- 2008: "Look What You Done" (Lethal Bizzle featuring Kate Nash)
- 2012: "AWWWKWAARRRDDD" (FIDLAR featuring Kate Na$h)
- 2013: "Hey, Asshole" (Watsky featuring Kate Nash)
- 2013: "Somebody Kill Me" (FIDLAR featuring Kate Na$h)
- 2016: "Rotten Teeth" (HOLYCHILD featuring Kate Nash)
- 2017: "I'll Be Fine" (D. Wing featuring Kate Nash)
- 2023: “Telephobia” (Baby Dave featuring Kate Nash)
- 2025: "Slushy" (Soft Play featuring Kate Nash)

== Promotional singles ==
Year	Title	Info
2010	"I Just Love You More"	Free download via Nash's website
2011	"I've Got a Secret"	Tour vinyl
2012	"Underestimate the Girl"	Free download / intro to third album
2012	"Fri-end?"	Free download
2012	"Faith"	Free download, theme song for Rookie Magazine
2014	"Go Forth, Feminist Warriors"	Free download, theme song for Rookie; with Tavi Gevinson, Suzy X., Kimya Dawson, Psalm One, Katie Crutchfield, MNDR, Thao Nguyen, Geneviève Castrée, Storey Littleton, Carrie Brownstein, Tegan and Sara, Dee Dee Penny, Ted Leo, Aimee Mann, Katy Davidson and Marianna Ritchey

== Music videos ==
Year	Title	Director(s)
2007	"Caroline's a Victim"	Kinga Burza
2007	"Foundations"	Kinga Burza
2007	"Mouthwash"	Kinga Burza
2007	"Pumpkin Soup"	Kinga Burza
2010	"Do-Wah-Doo"	Daniel Brereton
2010	"Kiss That Grrrl"	Daniel Brereton
2010	"Later On"	Daniel Brereton
2012	"Underestimate the Girl"	Lee Jones
2012	"Fri-end?" (Halloween version)	Lee Jones
2012	"Death Proof"	Aram Rappaport
2013	"3AM"	Lee Jones
2013	"Free My Pussy"	Kate Nash
2013	"OMYGOD!"	Aram Rappaport
2013	"Fri-end?"	Ryan Baxley
2013	"I Hate You This Christmas"	Skate Girls Productions
2014	"Sister"	Aram Rappaport
2014	"She Rules"	Kate Nash
2016	"Good Summer"	Lee Jones
2016	"My Little Alien"	Tyler Monsein
2017	"Agenda"	Minhal Beig
2017	"Call Me"	Jak O'Hare
2018	"Drink About You"	HOLYCHILD
2018	"Life in Pink"	HOLYCHILD
2018	"Hate You"	Aidan Zamiri
2018	"Twisted Up"	Kate Nash
2019	"Trash"	Aidan Zamiri
2019	"Body Heat"	
2019	"Bad Lieutenant"	
