= 9 Sad Symphonies Tour =

2024–2025 concert tour by Kate Nash

- Tour by Kate Nash
- Associated album: 9 Sad Symphonies
- Start date: 10 October 2024
- End date: 9 April 2025
- No. of shows: 32
- Supporting acts: Skating Polly; Joh Chase; Connie Constance; Eve Parker Finley; Shamir; Lenny Bull; Revenge Wife

The 9 Sad Symphonies Tour was mounted to promote Kate Nash's fifth album 9 Sad Symphonies. Running from 10 October to 18 December 2024 and then in April 2025, she was supported by Shamir, Joh Chase, Revenge Wife, Skating Polly, and Connie Constance. Her tour attracted press coverage between the North American and European legs due to the way it was funded, and one gig was preceded by a protest by Nash. Reviewers from The Scotsman, Narc, Louder Than War, When the Horn Blows, God Is in the TV, Brighton and Hove News, Belfast Telegraph, and The Times praised gigs in Glasgow, Newcastle upon Tyne, Manchester, London, Brighton, and Belfast.

== Background and history ==
Kate Nash, who released the single "Foundations" in 2007 and then the albums Made of Bricks (2007), My Best Friend Is You (2010), Girl Talk (2013), and Yesterday Was Forever (2018), recorded her fifth album, 9 Sad Symphonies, in 2020 and 2021. At the time, she did not have a label or a manager, but acquired both after touring in 2022 and going viral on TikTok for a video summarising her career. She released her fifth album in June 2024, which contained several singles including "Millions of Heartbeats" and "My Bile". The release of the latter was announced alongside the album's tour's Koko date in May 2024, while the rest of the European dates were announced that June and the North American dates were announced in September. The tour was her third tour in a row. Shamir, Joh Chase, Revenge Wife, and Skating Polly supported Nash at various dates of the latter, while her band for her Los Angeles date comprised Boom Buratto on guitar, Emma Brooks on bass, and Chrissy Lopez on drums. Nash had previously directed the music video for Skating Polly's "Tiger at the Drugstore". The tour's North American dates were her first on the continent for six years.

Between her North American tour and her European tour, Nash realised that she was in debt. Just before the latter, she set up an account on OnlyFans, which paid her bills. She stated on a subsequent Instagram post that she had opened the account in order to maintain the standard of her live show and on an episode of BBC Radio 4's Today programme that her account had paid for her to bring a crew member from the UK to continental Europe. Just before her Koko gig, and in conjunction with Save Our Scene, Nash dressed in a pink thong and travelled around London on a fire engine, visiting the London offices of Live Nation and Spotify and the House of Commons. At that day's gig, her lineup comprised a bassist, a guitarist, a drummer, a pianist/conductor, and several violinists, and featured tracks released throughout her career including "Foundations", which Nash teased throughout the set and ended the concert with. Brighton and Hove News reported that at her Brighton gig the day after, she had walked in to a version of Willy Wonka & the Chocolate Factory's "Pure Imagination", the introduction to her own track "Play", and a string version of "Foundations", and then played the following (with the last two played as an encore):

- "Millions of Heartbeats" (from 9 Sad Symphonies)
- "Vampyre" (from 9 Sad Symphonies)
- "Mouthwash" (from Made of Bricks)
- "Misery" (from 9 Sad Symphonies)
- "Cherry Pickin'"/"Death Proof"/"All Talk" (medley from Girl Talk)
- "Part Heart" (from Girl Talk)
- "I Hate Seagulls" (from My Best Friend Is You)
- "Nicest Thing" (from Made of Bricks)
- "Ray" (from 9 Sad Symphonies)
- "Wasteman" (from 9 Sad Symphonies)
- "My Little Alien" (from Yesterday Was Forever)
- "Kiss That Grrl"/"Shit Song"/"Later On"/"Mariella" (medley from My Best Friend Is You and Made of Bricks)
- "Foundations" (from Made of Bricks)
- "Space Odyssey 2001" (from 9 Sad Symphonies)
- "Birds" (from Made of Bricks)

Other songs Nash played during the tour included "Christmas Eve", an unreleased track from her sixth album, and her earlier tracks "Action", "Dickhead", an orchestral reprieve of "Mouthwash", "Vampyre", "Mariella", "My Bile", "Skeleton Song", and "(I've Had) The Time of My Life". Fiona Shepherd of The Scotsman praised what she saw at her Glasgow gig, while Natalie Greener of Narc wrote that her Newcastle upon Tyne gig "[proved] once again why she remains a beloved icon in the indie pop world". Laura Dean of God Is in the TV wrote of her Manchester gig that Nash "delivered a joyful, heartfelt performance to a Manchester crowd overflowing with love and energy", while MK Bennett of Louder Than War also reviewed the gig positively and described her opening act, Connie Constance, as "a ball of energy to get the crowd moving and involved". Reviewing her Koko gig, Adam Mir wrote that the ease with which she moved from earlier tracks to newer ones "proved she's just as much a pop star now as she was 20 years ago", while Jess Kemp reviewed what she saw in Brighton positively and Gareth Hanna of Belfast Telegraph wrote that her Belfast gig showed an artist "very much at the top of her game". Mark Beaumont of The Times described the what he saw at O2 Forum Kentish Town as "a consummate lesson in why theatre rock shows are so essential".

== Tour dates ==
9 Sad Symphonies Tour
Date	City	Country	Venue	Support	Ref
10 October 2024	Philadelphia	United States	World Cafe Live	Shamir	
11 October 2024	Washington, D.C.	United States	Howard Theatre	Shamir	
12 October 2024	New York City	United States	Racket	Joh Chase	
15 October 2024	Boston	United States	Crystal Ballroom	Shamir	
17 October 2024	Montreal	Canada	Les Foufounes Électriques	Eve Parker Finley	
18 October 2024	Toronto	Canada	Longboat Hall	Lenny Bull	
19 October 2024	Grand Rapids	United States	Pyramid Scheme	Revenge Wife Joh Chase	
20 October 2024	Indianapolis	United States	Turntable	Revenge Wife Joh Chase	
22 October 2024	Chicago	United States	Thalia Hall	Revenge Wife Joh Chase	
23 October 2024	Omaha	United States	Slowdown	Revenge Wife Joh Chase	
24 October 2024	Boulder	United States	Fox Theatre	Revenge Wife Joh Chase	
26 October 2024	Boise	United States	Neurolux	Revenge Wife Joh Chase	
27 October 2024	Seattle	United States	The Crocodile	Revenge Wife Joh Chase	
28 October 2024	Vancouver	Canada	Hollywood Theatre	Skating Polly	
29 October 2024	Portland	United States	Wonder Ballroom	Skating Polly	
1 November 2024	Pioneertown	United States	Pappy & Harriet's	Skating Polly	
2 November 2024	Los Angeles	United States	Teragram Ballroom	Skating Polly Joh Chase	
3 November 2024	San Francisco	United States	The Chapel	Skating Polly	
21 November 2024	Glasgow	Scotland	Òran Mór	Connie Constance	
22 November 2024	Newcastle upon Tyne	England	Northumbria University	Connie Constance	
25 November 2024	Leeds	England	Beckett University	Connie Constance	
26 November 2024	Manchester	England	New Century Hall	Connie Constance	
28 November 2024	London	England	Koko	Connie Constance	
29 November 2024	Brighton	England	Chalk	Connie Constance	
5 December 2024	Utrecht	Netherlands	TivoliVredenburg	Connie Constance	
6 December 2024	Osnabrück	Germany	Die Botschaft	Connie Constance	
9 December 2024	Cologne	Germany	Kantine	Connie Constance	
10 December 2024	Paris	France	L'Alhambra	Connie Constance	
17 December 2024	Belfast	Northern Ireland	Limelight	Connie Constance	
18 December 2024	Dublin	Ireland	The Academy	Connie Constance	
6 April 2025 (Note: Rescheduled from 7 December 2024.)	Berlin	Germany	Astra Kulturhaus	Connie Constance	
9 April 2025	London	England	O2 Forum Kentish Town	Connie Constance	
