= List of awards and nominations received by Kate Nash =

Kate Nash awards and nominations
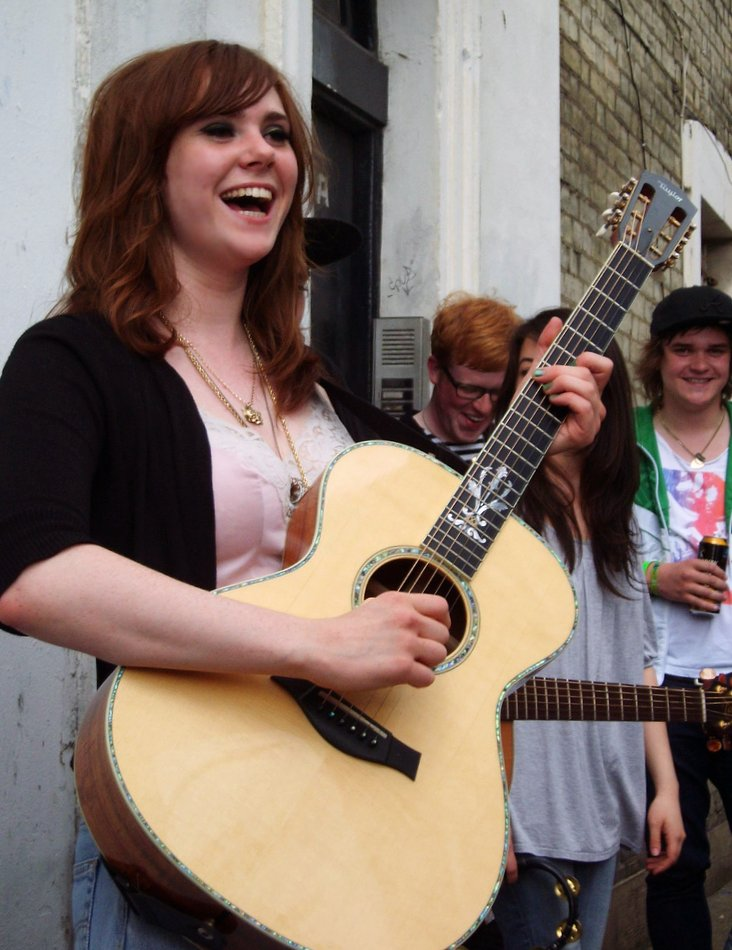
- Nash performing in 2007
Award	Wins	Nominations
ASCAP Awards	1	1
BRIT Awards	1	3
Elle Style Awards	1	1
Ivor Novello Awards	0	3
NME Awards	2	3
Q Awards	1	1
UK Music Video Awards	1	1
Vodafone Live Music Awards	1	2
- Totals
Awards won	8
Nominations	15

Kate Nash is an English singer-songwriter from London, England. She debuted in 2005, uploading several demos to the social networking service Myspace. Nash released her debut single "Caroline's a Victim" through independent record label Moshi Moshi Records in February 2007. The release brought her to the attention of Fiction Records, which signed her two months later. She has released three studio albums: Made of Bricks (2007), My Best Friend Is You (2010) and Girl Talk (2013). Made of Bricks reached number one in the United Kingdom and was certified platinum by the British Phonographic Industry (BPI). My Best Friend Is You charted at number eight in the UK, while Girl Talk peaked at number eighty-five.

Nash's debut studio album earned her several recognitions, including the BRIT Award for British Female Solo Artist, the ASCAP Vanguard Award and the Q Award for Breakthrough Artist. The album's lead single, "Foundations", received three nominations and won a UK Music Video Award for Best Pop Video. She has also been recognized by the Elle Style Awards, the NME Awards and the Vodafone Live Music Awards. As of 2013, Nash has received eight awards from fifteen nominations.

== ASCAP Awards ==
The annual ASCAP Awards honor members of the UK performance rights organization PRS, who are licensed by the American Society of Composers, Authors and Publishers (ASCAP) in the United States. Nash has received one award from one nomination.

Year	Nominated work	Award	Result	Ref.
2008	Made of Bricks	Vanguard Award	Won	

== BRIT Awards ==
The BRIT Awards are the British Phonographic Industry's (BPI) annual pop music awards. Nash has received one award from three nominations.

Year	Nominated work	Award	Result	Ref.
2008	Kate Nash	British Female Solo Artist	Won	
2008	Kate Nash	British Breakthrough Act	Nominated	
2008	"Foundations"	British Single Shortlist	Nominated	

== Elle Style Awards ==
The Elle Style Awards are hosted annually by lifestyle magazine Elle. Nash has received one award from one nomination.

Year	Nominated work	Award	Result	Ref.
2008	Kate Nash	Best Music Act	Won	

== Ivor Novello Awards ==
The Ivor Novello Awards, named after the Cardiff-born entertainer Ivor Novello, are awards for songwriting and composing. Nash has received one award from one nomination.

Year	Nominated work	Award	Result	Ref.
2008	"Foundations"	Best Contemporary Song	Nominated	

== NME Awards ==
The NME Awards are an annual music awards show founded by the music magazine NME. Nash has received two awards from three nominations.

Year	Nominated work	Award	Result	Ref.
2008	Kate Nash	Best Solo Artist	Won	
2008	Kate Nash	Best Dressed	Nominated	

=== NME Awards USA ===
Year	Nominated work	Award	Result	Ref.
2008	Kate Nash	Best International Indie/Alternative Solo Artist	Won	

== Q Awards ==
The Q Awards are the UK's annual pop music awards run by the music magazine Q to honor musical excellence. Winners are voted by readers of Q. Nash has received one award from one nomination.

Year	Nominated work	Award	Result	Ref.
2007	Kate Nash	Breakthrough Artist	Won	

== UK Music Video Awards ==
The UK Music Video Awards recognize "creativity and technical excellence" in music videos made within the United Kingdom. Nash has received one award from one nomination.

Year	Nominated work	Award	Result	Ref.
2008	"Foundations"	Best Pop Video	Won	

== Vodafone Live Music Awards ==
The Vodafone Live Music Awards honor the best live performers in the UK. Nash has received one award from two nominations.

Year	Nominated work	Award	Result	Ref.
2008	Kate Nash	British Female Solo Artist	Won	
2007	Kate Nash	British Female Solo Artist	Nominated	
