= 9 Sad Symphonies =

Studio album by Kate Nash
- Released: 21 June 2024
- Length: 38:30
- Label: Kill Rock Stars
- Producer: Frederik Thaae

Kate Nash chronology
Yesterday Was Forever (2018)	9 Sad Symphonies (2024)	Cailín (2027)

Singles from 9 Sad Symphonies
- 1. "Misery" Released: 19 May 2021; 2. "Horsie" Released: 7 September 2021; 3. "Wasteman" Released: 12 August 2022; 4. "Millions of Heartbeats" Released: 14 March 2024; 5. "Space Odyssey 2001" Released: 17 April 2024; 6. "My Bile" Released: 15 May 2024

9 Sad Symphonies is the fifth studio album by English singer and songwriter Kate Nash. Preceded by the release of "Misery", "Horsie", "Wasteman", "Millions of Heartbeats", "Space Odyssey 2001" and "My Bile", the album was released on 21 June 2024 via Kill Rock Stars and comprises ten tracks, of which nine were sad. Positive reviews came from The Line of Best Fit, Hot Press, The Times, DIY, MusicOMH, and The Independent, though reviewers from National World, The Skinny, The i Paper, Renowned for Sound, The Guardian, and The Irish Times were more critical.

== Background and singles ==
By 2024, Nash had released the albums Made of Bricks (2007), My Best Friend Is You (2010), Girl Talk (2013), and Yesterday Was Forever (2018) and created the musical Only Gold. She worked on the latter with Andy Blankenbuehler and Frederik Thaae, with whom she recorded 9 Sad Symphonies between 2020 and 2021. The pair would discuss ideas over Zoom, from which Nash would compose melodies and lyrics and Thaae would produce. Nash did not have a label or a manager at time of recording, having been dropped by her label in 2012 and having fired her manager during the pandemic, and released the album's first few singles whenever she felt like it.

Nash released the single "Misery" in May 2021. The track dealt with the feelings of depression she had felt during the COVID-19 pandemic. She stated in an interview the month after that her album would arrive later that year. That September, she released "Horsie", the first track she had written during the pandemic. A country song, the track was accompanied by a music video shot at the Grand Canyon, as she had visited it earlier that year as part of her Safely Out the Bedroom Tour, a series of outdoor gigs she had livestreamed. A further single, "Wasteman", was released in August 2022 and entailed Nash encouraging listeners to break up with poor partners. A combination of garage and piano melodies, the track was released alongside a music video starring Danny Dyer, his daughter Sunnie, and Gaby Diaz. Alexandra Pollard of The Independent wrote that the track "starts off softly, evoking some of the gentler tracks on Made of Bricks, before going full disco at the halfway point".

By March 2024, Nash had signed to Kill Rock Stars, a US-based independent label who had signed Bikini Kill, Elliott Smith, and Sleater-Kinney. She discovered the label via TikTok, having gone viral there after uploading a video outlining her career and asking for advice on how to release the album, and having set up an account on the platform in response to it partnering with the Brit Awards to allow its users to vote through the platform. That month, she announced the album and released "Millions of Heartbeats", a track about losing motivation. The Official Charts Company wrote that the song "begins as a twinkly piano ballad before swelling into a shimmering, heartfelt, full-throttle pop song".

In April 2024, she released "Space Odyssey 2001", in which she recounted her first date with her partner, in which they watched the Stanley Kubrick film 2001: A Space Odyssey. The song was released alongside a bloody video filmed at Yosemite and a demo of the track was released that month as a 7" single for Record Store Day, along with "Back At School". Nash has stated that the video was "inspired by Shakespeare and the way his plays use surrealism, fairytale and classic love stories, but also the genuine complexities of human relationships". The following month, she announced a tour promoting the album and released "My Bile", a track about her exhaustion with society's expectations of her and about reassessing past behaviours and current priorities.

== Release and reception ==
Nash released 9 Sad Symphonies on 21 June 2024. A press release announcing the album stated that it was inspired by "old Hollywood glamour, vintage musicals, and the relentless pursuit of beauty in a chaotic world". The album included ten tracks, of which nine were sad, and featured "Misery", "Horsie", "Wasteman", "Millions of Heartbeats", "Space Odyssey 2001", and "My Bile", and was so titled both as a joke and as a reference to fulfilling achievable targets. Of the four new tracks, "Ray" dealt with feeling sad during a birthday, "Abandoned" dealt with heartache, "These Feelings" dealt with exhaustion and self-doubt, and "Vampyre" addressed releasing past demons.

Positive reviews came from The Line of Best Fit, Hot Press, The Times, DIY, MusicOMH, and The Independent. Benjamin Jackson of National World stated that he found the album indistinguishable from her earlier works and did not plan to listen again, while Lucy Fitzgerald of The Skinny felt that some tracks were indistinguishable from others on the album and that "the album's staple tentative strings and gentle intonation evoke a sweet, Beatrix Potter-like bucolic world". Ed Power of The i Paper wrote that the best bits were "reminders that nobody does slice-of-life ennui as devastatingly as Nash", though felt it "a shame the quality control isn't more rigorous across this rewarding but inconsistent record". Eleanor Carr of Renowned for Sound wrote that "Nash's pop lyrics are slightly overshadowed by the overwhelming classic influences in the backing of nearly every track" and that "the instrumental choices and leave it seeming slightly unsure of itself",

Jenessa Williams of The Guardian wrote that Nash's "crinoline reinvention" felt like "a piece with Bridgerton" and felt that some songs were improved by the album's string arrangements, though felt "Wasteman", "Space Odyssey 2001", and "Vampyre" were impaired by a clunky transition, excessive detail, and a simplistic rhyme scheme. Lauren Murphy of Irish Times wrote that the "somewhat disjointed pop album that's often more maudlin than enjoyable for the listener" contained "beautiful arrangements in abundance", though felt "many of Nash's lyrics sound like the aural equivalent of an exposed nerve". She cited "Everything you feel can just come undone / And the media supports all the far-right scum." and "Tick tick tick in my head / Do I really wish that I was dead?" from "Millions of Heartbeats" and "Ray" as examples of the latter.

== Track listing ==
All lyrics are written by Kate Nash.

9 Sad Symphonies track listing
No.	Title	Music	Length
1.	"Millions of Heartbeats"	Nash; Frederik Thaae; Linda Buratto	4:00
2.	"Misery"	Nash; Thaae	3:37
3.	"Wasteman"	Nash; Thaae; Buratto; Sam Duckworth	3:28
4.	"Abandoned"	Nash; Thaae	4:03
5.	"Horsie"	Nash; Thaae	3:52
6.	"My Bile"	Nash; Thaae	3:40
7.	"These Feelings"	Nash; Thaae	3:08
8.	"Space Odyssey 2001"	Nash	4:53
9.	"Ray"	Nash	3:34
10.	"Vampyre"	Nash; Thaae	4:15
Total length:			38:30

== Personnel ==
Musicians

- Kate Nash – lead vocals, background vocals
- Frederik Thaae – keyboards, orchestra direction, percussion, programming (all tracks); background vocals (track 4), guitar (5, 10)
- Rhea Fowler – violin
- Malthe Rostrup – piano (tracks 1, 3, 4, 6, 10), harpsichord (6)
- Johanna Bechsgaard – background vocals (tracks 1, 4–6, 10)
- Maria Leeson Andersen – background vocals (tracks 1, 4–6, 10)
- Vibe Wingstrand – background vocals (tracks 1, 4–6, 10)
- Boomvision – lead guitar (track 1)

Technical

- Frederik Thaae – production, mixing, engineering
- Malthe Rostrup – co-production, mixing (tracks 1–4, 6, 10); engineering (1–3, 10)
- Sam Duckworth – co-production (tracks 2–4), engineering (2, 3)
- Anders Schumann – mastering
- Ed McEntee – engineering (tracks 1–3, 6, 7)
- James Kirk – engineering (tracks 1–3, 6, 7)
- Danny Nogueiras – engineering (tracks 1, 2, 4, 6, 7)

== Charts ==
Chart performance for 9 Sad Symphonies
Chart (2024)	Peak position
Scottish Albums (Official Charts)	37
UK Albums (Official Charts)	78
UK Independent Albums (Official Charts)	1

== See also ==
- List of UK Independent Albums Chart number ones of 2024
