= Powder room =

A powder room may refer to:

- Powder Room (film), a 2013 film
- A public toilet
- A toilet (room), a room containing a toilet in a private dwelling, often for guests (U.S.)
