= Germ =

Germ or germs may refer to:

== Science ==
- Germ (microorganism), an informal word for a pathogen
- Germ cell, cell that gives rise to the gametes of an organism that reproduces sexually
- Germ layer, a primary layer of cells that forms during embryonic development
- Cereal germ, the reproductive part of a cereal grain
- Tooth germ, an aggregation of cells that eventually forms a tooth
- Germ theory of disease, which states that some diseases are caused by microorganisms
- Germ (mathematics), an object in a topological space that captures local properties

== Art and media ==
=== Music ===
- "Germ" (song), by Kate Nash
- Germs (band), an American punk rock band
- Germ (musician), a stage name of Tim Wright
- Germ (rapper), an American rapper
- "Germs" (song), by "Weird Al" Yankovic
- "Germs", a song by JPEGMafia from Veteran
- The Germ (album), by Victim's Family
- Germ (band), created by Tim Yatras.

=== Others ===
- Germ (film), a 2010 Hindi-language film
- "Germs" (Invader Zim), an episode of Invader Zim
- The Germ (periodical), a British art magazine published in 1850
- The Germs (comics), a comic strip
- "The Germ", an episode of G.I. Joe: A Real American Hero

== Other uses ==
- Germ, Hautes-Pyrénées, a commune in the Hautes-Pyrénées department of southwestern France
- Germ Hofma (born 1925), Dutch football player in the 1940s and 1950s

== See also ==
- Germination, the process by which an organism grows from a seed or similar structure
- Stem cell, biological cells that can differentiate into other types of cells
