= Jeff Ellis (sound engineer) =

- Born: Jeffrey Charles Ellis; July 16, 1984 (age 42); Phoenix, Arizona, U.S.
- Origin: Scottsdale, Arizona
- Genres: Pop, R&B, electropop, pop-rap, rock
- Occupations: Recording engineer, mix engineer
- Years active: 2008–present

Jeff Ellis (born 16 July 1984) is an American recording engineer and mix engineer. His most notable work was featured on both of Frank Ocean's critically acclaimed albums: Channel Orange, and Blonde.

== Career ==
In 2009, after changing careers from finance to music, Ellis garnered an internship at EastWest Studios, formerly United/Western Recorders, where artists such as Frank Sinatra and The Beach Boys once recorded. When his internship ended, Ellis was asked to join the staff as an assistant musical engineer.

In 2012, Ellis became the engineer for recording artist Frank Ocean when he arrived at EastWest Studios to record a track for his debut album, Channel Orange. Ellis developed a working relationship with Ocean and was offered the opportunity to freelance full-time on the remainder of the project. Channel Orange was a critical success, earning Ellis a 2013 Grammy for Best Urban Contemporary Album, as well as a nomination for Album of the Year. The album also includes the Record Of The Year-nominated track "Thinkin Bout You" a song that Ellis mixed.

Ellis continued to work with Frank Ocean from 2012 to 2016 on his follow up album Blonde. Ellis has also worked with such notable artists such as Akon, Skylar Grey, Nick Jonas, Pernille Rosendahl and Kate Nash, whose album Made of Bricks hit #1 on the UK album chart in 2007.

== Awards and nominations ==
Year	Organization	Award	Work	Result
2013	55th Grammy Awards			
2013	55th Grammy Awards	Record of the Year	"Thinkin Bout You"	Nominated
2013	55th Grammy Awards	Album of the Year	Channel Orange	Nominated
2013	55th Grammy Awards	Best Urban Contemporary Album	Channel Orange	Won

== Notable credits ==
Year	Artist	Album	Details
2024	JPEGMafia	I Lay Down My Life for You	Mixer (with JPEGMafia)
2023	JPEGMafia and Danny Brown	Scaring the Hoes	Mixer (with JPEGMafia)
2018	Kali Uchis	Isolation	Mixer
2018	Kali Uchis	"After the Storm"	Mixer
2018	The Neighbourhood	The Neighbourhood	Mixer, Track 10 "Reflections"
2017	Jesse Rutherford	&	Mixer, Master Engineer
2016	Frank Ocean	Blonde	Engineer
2016	Nick Jonas	Last Year Was Complicated	Mixer
2016	SWMRS	Drive North	Mixer
2016	Pernille Rosendahl	Dark Bird	Mixer
2013	Earl Sweatshirt	Doris	Engineer
2013	Kate Nash	Girl Talk	Engineer, Vocals (Background)
2013	Skylar Grey	Don't Look Down	Vocal Engineer
2012	Frank Ocean	Channel Orange	Engineer, Mixer
2012	Odd Future	The OF Tape Vol. 2	Engineer, Mixer
2012	Shoshana Bean	O'Farrel Street	Mixer
