= Do-Wah-Doo =

Single by Kate Nash

from the album My Best Friend Is You
- B-side: "Grrrilla Munch" • "R n B Side" • "Do-Wah-Doo" (performed by Ryan Jarman)
- Released: 12 April 2010
- Genre: Indie pop; indie rock
- Length: 2:35
- Label: Fiction
- Songwriter(s): Kate Nash
- Producer(s): Bernard Butler

Kate Nash singles chronology
"Merry Happy" (2008)	"Do-Wah-Doo" (2010)	"Kiss That Grrrl" (2010)

Alternative cover
- The vinyl cover

Music video
- "Do-Wah-Doo" on YouTube

"Do-Wah-Doo" is a song by English indie pop singer-songwriter Kate Nash, featured on her 2010 second album My Best Friend Is You (2010). Written by Nash and produced by Bernard Butler, it was released as the lead single from the album on 12 April 2010, one week before the release of the album. "Do-Wah-Doo" was a moderate commercial success, reaching number 15 on the UK Singles Chart – a position exceeded only by her hit song "Foundations" in 2007.

== Background ==
"Do-Wah-Doo" is said to be inspired by 1950s and 1960s girl groups such as The Ronettes and The Supremes, and when asked about it by Spin, Nash said the following:

The song's about one of my best friends from when I was younger. He totally betrayed me by hanging out with these enemies of mine - these perfect girls, who wore lip-gloss and talked about boys and were really annoying. He and I had grown up climbing trees, playing in the woods, and going on holiday together, so I thought he'd be cooler than that. But when he turned 15 years old he wanted a girlfriend. I was like, 'Well fine, I'll just pretend I don't give a shit even though I'll never ever forgive you, even when I'm 22 years old and writing a song about it.'

== Critical reception ==
Nick Levine of Digital Spy gave the song a positive review stating:

Three years later and she hasn't started singing like Kiri Te Kanawa, while her lyrics continue to dance a line between "admirably direct" and "downright bleedin' obvious". Still, there's no denying that 'Do Wah Doo' ushers in a subtle shift in direction for Nash without sacrificing the pop smarts that propped up Bricks. Produced by Bernard Butler, it's a girl-groupy pop nugget featuring lashings of surf guitar, some nice brassy bursts and a brain-invading "bum-bum-de-bum" hook. Will it win her any new fans? To be honest, it'll probably come down to how you feel about a girl-groupy pop nugget that rhymes "lady" and "shady"... wrapped up with the line: "Well, I think she's a bitch..

== Music video ==
The music video for "Do-Wah-Doo", directed by Daniel Brereton, was filmed on 18 February 2010 at Brooklands Museum, Surrey, England. Nash said the following:

I shot the video for 'Do-Wah-Doo' last week on Thursday and it was so, so much fun! The best fun I ever had on a video shoot. It stars a lot of my wonderful friends who are pretty much amazing. I wrote the treatment almost a year ago. It's a love story set on a plane in the late '50s. For some reason, the idea has always been in my head.

In the video, Kate Nash is an airline stewardess, and is a rival to another stewardess (who is shown serving alcoholic drinks to the pilots) for the affections of a handsome male steward. At the end of the video, whether due to air turbulence, or the drunkenness of the pilots, or the deliberate actions of the pilots, Nash is literally thrown into the arms of the steward by the motions of the plane.

== Track listing ==
All tracks are written by Kate Nash.

7" vinyl (2736397)
No.	Title	Length
1.	"Do-Wah-Doo"	2:35
2.	"Grrrilla Munch"	3:12
3.	"R n B Side"	2:16
Total length:		8:03

CD single (2737819)
No.	Title	Length
1.	"Do-Wah-Doo"	2:35
2.	"Do-Wah-Doo" (performed by Ryan Jarman)	3:08
Total length:		5:43

Digital download
No.	Title	Length
1.	"Do-Wah-Doo"	2:35
2.	"Do-Wah-Doo" ("Clocktower Remix" by Nick Zinner)	3:06
3.	"Do-Wah-Doo" (music video)	2:41
Total length:		8:22

== Personnel ==
Musicians

- Kate Nash – vocals on all tracks; percussion on "Do-Wah-Doo" and "R n B Side"; piano and keyboards on "Do-Wah-Doo"; synthesizers, recording, production, engineering and mixing on "RnB Side"; art direction
- Bernard Butler – bass, production, engineering and mixing on "Do-Wah-Doo" and "Grrrilla Munch"; acoustic guitar, organ and bongos on "Do-Wah-Doo"; synthesizers on "Grrrilla Munch"
- Elliott Andrews – drums on "Do-Wah-Doo" and "Grrrilla Munch"
- Brett Alaimo – guitars on "Do-Wah-Doo"

Production personnel

- Richard Woodcraft – engineering on "Do-Wah-Doo" and "Grrrilla Munch"
- Robbie Nelson – engineering on "Do-Wah-Doo" and "Grrrilla Munch"
- Adie Kaye – engineering assistance on "Do-Wah-Doo" and "Grrrilla Munch"
- Chris Potter – mastering

Additional personnel

- Mat Maitland – art direction
- Kate Gibb – artwork
- Clare Nash – photography

== Charts ==
Chart (2010)	Peak position
Austria (Ö3 Austria Top 40)	55
Belgium (Ultratip Bubbling Under Flanders)	8
Germany (GfK)	36
UK Singles (OCC)	15
