= Kiss That Grrrl =

Single by Kate Nash

from the album My Best Friend Is You
- B-side: "Great Big Kiss" (with Billy Bragg) • "Song For Corrado" • "Kiss That Grrrl" (performed by Trachtenburg Family Slideshow Players)
- Released: 11 July 2010 (Digital); 12 July 2010 (Physical)
- Genre: Indie pop
- Length: 3:42
- Label: Fiction
- Songwriter(s): Kate Nash
- Producer(s): Bernard Butler

Kate Nash singles chronology
| "Do-Wah-Doo" (2010) | "Kiss That Grrrl" (2010) | "Later On" (2010) |

Alternative cover
- The vinyl cover

Music video
- "Kiss That Grrrl" on YouTube

"Kiss That Grrrl" is a song by English indie pop singer-songwriter Kate Nash, featured on her 2010 second album My Best Friend Is You. Written by Nash and produced by Bernard Butler, it was released as the second single from the album on 12 July 2010.

== Track listing ==
7" vinyl (2741839)
| No. | Title | Writer(s) | Length |
|---|---|---|---|
| 1. | "Kiss That Grrrl" | Kate Nash | 3:44 |
| 2. | "Great Big Kiss" (with Billy Bragg) | George Francis Morton | 2:27 |
| 3. | "Song For Corrado" | Nash | 2:29 |
| Total length: | | | 8:39 |

CD single (2741841)
| No. | Title | Writer(s) | Length |
|---|---|---|---|
| 1. | "Kiss That Grrrl" | Kate Nash | 3:44 |
| 2. | "Kiss That Grrrl" (Performed by Trachtenburg Family Slideshow Players) | Nash | 4:42 |
| Total length: | | | 8:25 |

== B-sides ==
- "Great Big Kiss" is a duet with singer Billy Bragg and a cover, the original having been sung by The Shangri-Las. The song has been performed at many gigs before this release.
- "Song For Corrado" is Nash's first song entirely in another language. The song is sung entirely in Italian.

== Music video ==
The track's music video was released on 4 June 2010. The video evolves around Nash performing a dance, her backup dancers being two men (one of them Nash's boyfriend, The Cribs guitarist Ryan Jarman, and the other being her close friend Wesley Goode who also appeared in the videos for "Pumpkin Soup" and "Do Wah Doo"). During the video, Nash is seen wearing several risqué outfits.

== Lyrics ==
On 23 April 2010, Nash explained to Spin magazine: "Kiss That Grrrl is about being in a relationship and going out and drinking, then arguing. Maybe you're being a d--k to your girlfriend, or you're a bitch to your boyfriend, and you know you're being mean because you can get away with it. And it's also about being in love with someone and knowing that if they ever cheated on you, you'd die." She told Rolling Stone: "These girl-group songs sound really joyous, but the lyrics are quite dark and heartbreaking." Nash also told Rolling Stone that the song was influenced by her recent obsession with the poetry of English confessional poet and punk blues musician Billy Childish.

== Critical reception ==
Mayer Nissim of Digital Spy gave the song a neutral review stating:

Teasy title aside, 'Kiss That Grrrl' follows straight on from its predecessor rather than the delightfully riotous 'I Just Love...', reminding you of classic girl-fronted rock 'n' roll in the same way The Pipettes did a couple of years back. However, once you strip back the layers of homage/pastiche/influence, you're left with a classic Nash song about - what else? - being in a bickering couple and the simmering jealousy and self-doubt that underlines young love ("I don't like it how she makes you laugh so much / How when you're talking, that you touch"). It doesn't quite have the scope and grandeur of the music from the era that inspired it, but Nash fans should still love this, and a few newbies may even be snagged by the shiny, stylish production and solid pop hooks..
