= Yesterday Was Forever =

Studio album by Kate Nash
- Released: 30 March 2018
- Genres: Indie rock; garage punk; punk rock; indie pop
- Length: 50:45
- Label: Girl Gang
- Producers: Jarrad K; Frederik Thaae; Kate Nash; Kuya Productions; Tom Biller

Kate Nash chronology
Girl Talk (2013)	Yesterday Was Forever (2018)	9 Sad Symphonies (2024)

Singles from Yesterday Was Forever
- 1. "My Little Alien" Released: 14 November 2016; 2. "Call Me" Released: 7 April 2017; 3. "Drink About You" Released: 2 February 2018; 4. "Life in Pink" Released: 16 March 2018; 5. "Hate You" Released: 14 September 2018; 6. "Body Heat" Released: 21 June 2019

Yesterday Was Forever is the fourth studio album by English singer-songwriter Kate Nash. Her first album in five years, the record notably sees Nash return to her indie pop roots. It was released independently and funded by fans via Kickstarter. To promote the album, Nash embarked on the Yesterday Was Forever Tour in the United States and Canada, and has performed at several festivals, including Reading and Leeds Festival.

The album's themes revolve around mental health and relationships. Nash openly confirmed that she has obsessive–compulsive disorder and anxiety and is an advocate for raising awareness for the importance of mental health. "Musical Theatre" is Nash's personal interpretation of struggling with mental health.

== Critical reception ==
Professional ratings
Aggregate scores
Source	Rating
Metacritic	63/100
Review scores
Source	Rating
Drowned in Sound	9/10
The Guardian	2/5 stars
NME	3/5 stars
Paste	6.6/10

At Metacritic, a review aggregator which assigns a normalized rating out of 100 to reviews from mainstream critics, the album received an average score of 63, based on 13 reviews, which indicates "generally favorable reviews".

== Track listing ==
Yesterday Was Forever track listing
No.	Title	Writer(s)	Producer(s)	Length
1.	"Life in Pink"	Kate Nash; Jarrad Kritzstein	Jarrad K	4:15
2.	"Call Me"	Nash; Kritzstein	Jarrad K	3:32
3.	"Take Away"	Nash; Kritzstein	Jarrad K	3:15
4.	"Hate You"	Nash; Julia Michaels; Nolan Lombrozza	Frederik Thaae; Nash	3:23
5.	"Drink About You"	Nash; Kritzstein	Jarrad K	3:12
6.	"Body Heat"	Nash; Asia Whiteacre; Terence Lam; Robert Gerongco; Samuel Gerongco; Matthew Genovese	Kuya Productions	3:04
7.	"Karaoke Kiss"	Nash; Kritzstein	Jarrad K	3:52
8.	"Musical Theatre"	Nash; Thaae	Thaae	2:57
9.	"California Poppies"	Nash; Thaae	Thaae	4:20
10.	"Always Shining"	Nash	Tom Biller	3:33
11.	"Today"	Nash; Thaae	Thaae	3:35
12.	"Twisted Up"	Nash; Thaae	Thaae	3:27
13.	"My Little Alien"	Nash; Kritzstein	Jarrad K	3:51
14.	"To the Music I Belong"	Nash		4:29
Total length:				50:45

== Personnel ==
- Kate Nash – vocals
- Alex Gordon – mastering (tracks 1–3, 5–14)
- Geoff Pesche – mastering (track 4)
- Jason Defour – mixing (tracks 1–9, 11, 12, 14)
- Tom Biller – mixing (track 10)
- Jeff Ellis – mixing (track 13)
- Madison Douglas – backing vocals (track 14)
- Rhea Fowler – violin (track 14)
