= Powder Room (film) =

- DVD cover
- Directed by: MJ Delaney
- Screenplay by: Rachel Hirons
- Story by: Jennifer Davies; Amirah Garba; Rachel Hirons; Stephanie Jay; Stef O'Driscoll; Amy Revelle; Natasha Sparkes; Emily Wallis
- Based on: When Women Wee by Rachel Hirons
- Produced by: Damian Jones; James Cotton; Nichola Martin
- Starring: Sheridan Smith; Jaime Winstone; Kate Nash; Oona Chaplin; Riann Steele; Alice Sanders; Sarah Hoare; Johnnie Fiori
- Cinematography: John Lee
- Edited by: Ben Jordan
- Music by: Fake Club
- Production company: DJ Films
- Distributed by: Universal Pictures; Vertigo Releasing
- Release date: 21 November 2013
- Running time: 86 minutes
- Country: United Kingdom
- Language: English

Powder Room is a 2013 British comedy film directed by MJ Delaney and written by Rachel Hirons. It is based on the stage play When Women Wee scripted by Hirons, devised by Natasha Sparkes, Stephanie Jay, Emily Wallis, Amirah Garba, Amy Revelle, Stef O'Driscoll, and Jennifer Davies. The film stars Sheridan Smith, Jaime Winstone, Kate Nash, and Oona Castilla Chaplin.

== Plot ==
The comedy follows Sam, as her life is turned upside down on a big night out. When reunited with her old college friends, Sam is forced to re-evaluate her life and constructs an elaborate façade in order to convince herself and her friends that she has it all. But once her dysfunctional yet devoted trio of best mates intervene, her carefully crafted charade begins to crumble amidst the shots, cigarettes, ciders and toilet transgressions. Faced with some very harsh realities, Sam must struggle to remain true to herself and reassess exactly what she wants from life.

The film tells its story in a series of vignettes showing conversations held in the powder room of a nightclub.

== Cast ==
- Sheridan Smith as Sam
- Jaime Winstone as Chanel
- Kate Nash as Michelle
- Oona Chaplin as Jess
- Riann Steele as Paige
- Alice Sanders as Mel
- Sarah Hoare as Saskia
- Johnnie Fiori as Toilet attendant
- Micah Balfour as James
- Alex Warren as Sean
- Zara White as Stacey
- Antonia Bernath as Kim
- Jodi Halpin as Linzi
- Bunmi Mojekwu as Louise
- Lashana Lynch as Laura
- Elarica Gallacher as Jenny
- Stephanie Jay as Alex
- Natasha Sparkes as Bunny
- Emily Wallis as Helena

== Production ==
The story was partly inspired by a clubbing trip on which Hirons overheard two women talking candidly about anal sex in a cubicle of a women's toilet. Damian Jones decided to take the play from stage to screen after watching the cast of five young actresses Emily Wallis, Amirah Garba, Stephanie Jay, Natasha Sparkes, and Amy Revelle on stage at The Soho Theatre, playing up to six different characters each in various sketches in the provocative comedy, which had transferred from The Edinburgh Fringe Festival.

Principal photography commenced on 29 November 2012 at 3 Mills Studios in London, and was also filmed in locations in Holloway, London.

== Music ==
Music for the film was curated by the all-female, five-piece rock band, Fake Club. The band appeared in the film, performing music of their own writing, including some songs created specifically for the film. Fake Club members were also responsible for the selection of all other tracks used in the film. The soundtrack also features the track 'Pretty Colours' by London-based, Swedish band FRANCOBOLLO which first appeared in their debut e.p HARPHOLMA.
