= Merry Happy =

2008 single by Kate Nash

- CD single cover art

Single by Kate Nash

from the album Made of Bricks
- B-side: "Model Behaviour"; "The Lion The Devil & The Spider"; "Don't You Want to Share the Guilt"
- Released: 24 March 2008 (UK)
- Recorded: 2007–2008
- Genre: Indie pop, alternative rock
- Length: 5:28
- Label: Fiction
- Songwriter(s): Kate Nash

Kate Nash singles chronology
"Pumpkin Soup" (2007)	"Merry Happy" (2008)	"Do-Wah-Doo" (2010)

"Merry Happy" is the fifth single by British singer-songwriter Kate Nash. It is the fourth single from her album Made of Bricks. It was released on CD and two 7" singles on 24 March 2008, limited to 1000 of each format.

== Background information ==
The B-side to the CD version, "Model Behaviour" has been performed by Nash at recent concerts. Recorded performances of the song were posted under the title "You Don't Have to Suck Dick to Succeed" on YouTube, although the correct title is "Model Behaviour". "Don't You Want to Share the Guilt" was later updated for her second album, My Best Friend Is You.

== Promotion ==
Nash had performed the song on UK TV show The Shockwaves Album Chart Show on The Hits. The song was used in advertisements for the film Happy-Go-Lucky. Merry Happy also appeared in one scene of I Really Hate My Job as background music. The song was also used in season 1, episode 14 of the NBC TV series Community, "Interpretive Dance". It was also featured in the 6th episode of season 4 of Grey's Anatomy.

== Track listings ==
All songs written by Kate Nash

UK CD
No.	Title	Writer(s)	Length
1.	"Merry Happy"	Nash	5:24
2.	"Model Behaviour"	Nash	3:25

UK Vinyl 1
No.	Title	Writer(s)	Length
1.	"Merry Happy"	Nash	5:24
2.	"The Lion, The Devil & The Spider"	Nash	1:49

UK Vinyl 2
No.	Title	Writer(s)	Length
1.	"Merry Happy"	Nash	5:24
2.	"Don't You Want To Share The Guilt?"	Nash	4:57

Digital Download
No.	Title	Writer(s)	Length
1.	"Merry Happy"	Nash	5:24
2.	"Merry Happy" (Live from Belfast)	Nash

== Chart positions ==
Each copy of "Merry Happy" had a number from 1–1000 printed on it. A competition was held on the official Kate Nash website, where fans who bought a copy of 'Merry Happy' with a winning number on it would win the chance for Kate Nash to customize their copy for them. The 10 winning numbers were posted on katenash.co.uk. The competition boosted single sales only slightly, as "Merry Happy" was not commercially successful, peaking at 116 in the UK Singles Chart. In the United States the song managed to chart on the Bubbling Under chart at #12, while charting at #97 on the Pop 100 due to digital downloads fueled by the album's promotion on iTunes the week of its release.

Charts	Peak position
United Kingdom (Official Charts Company)	116
Bubbling Under Hot 100 Singles	12*
Billboard Pop 100	97
Canadian Singles Chart	84

- Position number 12 on the Bubbling Under Chart is the equivalent of 112 on the Hot 100.
