= Mouthwash (song) =

Single by Kate Nash

from the album Made of Bricks
- B-side: "Stitching Leggings"; "Take 'Em Back"; "Dirt (Demo from Iceland)"
- Released: 1 October 2007
- Genre: Indie rock
- Length: 5:02 (album version); 3:58 (video edit)
- Label: Fiction
- Songwriter: Kate Nash

Kate Nash singles chronology
"Foundations" (2007)	"Mouthwash" (2007)	"Pumpkin Soup" (2007)

Music video
- "Mouthwash" on YouTube

"Mouthwash" is a song by Kate Nash. On 1 October 2007, it was released as her third single, and the second to be taken from her debut studio album, Made of Bricks. The song, which Nash described as a "protest song", includes lyrics in which Nash describes herself and the "confusion of youth".

Upon its release, the song drew both favorable and mixed assessments from music critics. It became Nash's second top thirty entry on the UK Singles Chart, following her number-two single "Foundations". The single also entered the singles charts in Belgium and Scotland.

== Composition ==
"Mouthwash" is a medium-tempo pop song in the key of D-flat major. It was composed by Nash and Paul Epworth.

The song's chorus includes the lyrics "I use mouthwash, sometimes I floss, I've got a family and we drink cups of tea", while in its verses Nash "lists various parts of herself and explains why you can't break her". Its lyrical themes have been likened to "I'm Every Woman" and "I Will Survive." The song has been described as "less combative" than many of the other tracks on Made of Bricks, such as "Foundations".

Nash stated in an interview that the song is "a protest song that comes from the confusion of youth. I guess it's about not quite being there yet. About not feeling totally sure where you are going but still feeling the need to defend all the things that make you into who you are. We all have routines and things in common, that still somehow manage to be totally unique and personal to you."

== Release ==
The song's CD single was released in the United Kingdom on 24 September 2007.

== Reception ==
=== Critical ===
Upon its release, the song was awarded four stars out of five by BBC Radio 1's Chart Blog. Writing for that outlet, critic Fraser McAlpine wrote that he would have awarded the song five stars, except for the fact that he considered the song inferior to other Made of Bricks tracks (including "Foundations," "Merry Happy," and "We Get On").

Conversely, Mike Diver, writing for Drowned in Sound, gave the song a score of five out of ten. Diver deemed the song "perfectly pleasant" but continued that it is "half-realised and far from fulfilling."

=== Commercial ===
Following its release, the song became Nash's second Top 30 single in the United Kingdom. On the UK Singles Chart dated 18 August 2007, it debuted at number 84. It re-entered the singles chart dated 15 September 2007, and on the chart dated 7 October 2007, it attained its peak of number 23. It spent a total of ten weeks on the chart.

== Track listings ==
All songs written by Kate Nash.

UK CD
No.	Title	Writer(s)	Length
1.	"Mouthwash"	Nash	5:02
2.	"Stitching Leggings"	Nash	2:17

UK Vinyl 1
No.	Title	Writer(s)	Length
1.	"Mouthwash"	Nash	5:02
2.	"Dirt (Demo from Iceland)"	Nash	6:06

UK Vinyl 2
No.	Title	Writer(s)	Length
1.	"Mouthwash"	Nash	5:02
2.	"Take 'Em Back" (misprinted as "Take 'Em Out" on the cover)	Nash	2:19

Digital Download
No.	Title	Writer(s)	Length
1.	"Mouthwash" (Hot Chip Remix)	Nash	5:26

== Music video ==
The music video for "Mouthwash" was filmed at the Bradford Alhambra on the 20 August 2007, and had earlier filmed at the Bristol Hippodrome in late July or early August 2007. Nash performed with the touring cast of Starlight Express on both occasions, who learned two new routines for the video. It features Nash backstage of the theatres, and on the theatre stages playing the piano while the show is being performed. The video was directed by Kinga Burza.

== Charts ==
Chart (2007–2008)	Peak position
Belgium (Ultratip Bubbling Under Flanders)	6
Scottish Singles Sales (Official Charts)	23
UK Singles (Official Charts)	23
