= Caroline's a Victim =

Single by Kate Nash
- B-side: "Birds"
- Released: 19 February 2007
- Recorded: 2006
- Length: 2:59
- Label: Moshi Moshi
- Songwriter: Kate Nash

Kate Nash singles chronology
"Caroline's a Victim" (2007)	"Foundations" (2007)

"Caroline's a Victim" is the debut single by English singer-songwriter Kate Nash, released digitally and on 7" vinyl 5 February 2007. "Caroline's a Victim" was a popular track on Kate Nash's MySpace profile. It is also featured on the CD Moshi Moshi Singles Compilation, and appears on the CD single for her song "Foundations". The B-side, "Birds", later featured on her début album, Made of Bricks. It has sold a total of 2,000 copies in the UK. It was written about Caroline Davis, with whom she attended the BRIT School. She was a "Victim" because that was what fans of the band the Killers called themselves.

The music video for "Caroline's a Victim" consists of Nash playing various instruments while singing. The Teenagers Myspace page is visible in the video. It was directed by Kinga Burza.

== Track listing ==
7" Vinyl / CD / Digital Download
No.	Title	Writer(s)	Length
1.	"Caroline's A Victim"	Nash	3:01
2.	"Birds (Demo)"	Nash	3:57

CD

- "Caroline's a Victim" - track 4 on Moshi Moshi Singles Compilation
- "Birds" (Original Version) - track 5 on début album Made of Bricks
