= Holychild =

2010s American indie pop band

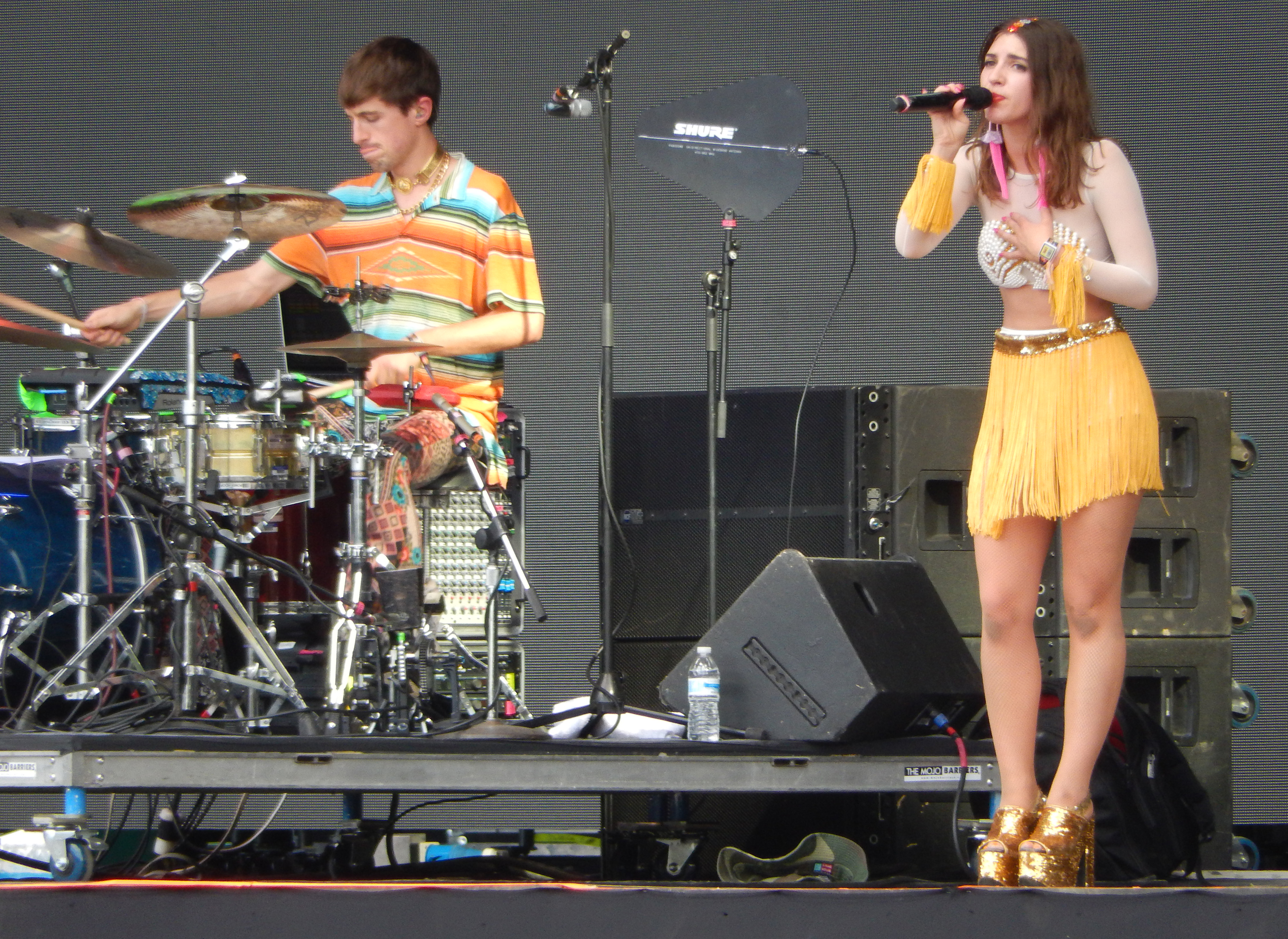
- Holychild performing at Lollapalooza 2015

Background information
- Origin: Los Angeles, California, U.S.
- Genres: Indie pop; synthpop; electropop; indietronica; Brat Pop
- Years active: 2012–2020
- Label: Glassnote
- Spinoffs: Revenge Wife
- Past members: Liz Nistico; Louie Diller
- Website: holychildmusic.com (archived at Wayback Machine)

Holychild (stylized as HOLYCHILD) was an American indie pop duo from Los Angeles, California. The band consists of songwriter and vocalist Liz Nistico and producer and multi-instrumentalist Louie Diller, though they often play with more musicians for their live show. The band signed to Glassnote Records in 2013, and define their genre as "brat pop". Holychild released their full-length debut album The Shape of Brat Pop to Come in 2015. After a two-year hiatus, the band broke their silence with four singles in 2018. Their second studio album, The Theatrical Death of Julie Delicious, was released in 2019.

The duo disbanded in 2020, citing a desire to work on solo projects. Diller now works as a producer, while Nistico releases music under the name Revenge Wife.

== History ==
=== Formation (2012) ===
HOLYCHILD formed in college at George Washington University in D.C., where Diller was the musical accompanist for Nistico's modern dance class in 2011. The two were drawn to each other's creativity and abilities. In 2011 they spent a summer together writing and making music until Nistico moved to Brooklyn and Diller stayed in DC. In 2012 Diller convinced Nistico to move back to Washington, DC to record their songs and start a band. They formed HOLYCHILD and moved to L.A. in September 2012. Their initial focus was on music, songs, production and visual accompaniments. The two started performing in early 2013.

=== Mindspeak ===
The duo found early success in 2013 through "Happy With Me", a fierce challenge to media images that received more than 100,000 plays in just one week and placing #1 on Hype Machine's Popular Charts. The band continues to receive local and national support, with Nylon Magazine describing the track as "mind-blowingly addictive," Billboard grouping them in their annual "14 artists to watch in 2014", and LA Weekly naming HOLYCHILD "one of the ten LA bands who are going to blow up in 2014."

In 2014, the duo was an opening act for Danish singer MØ.

Produced by Louie Diller, HOLYCHILD's debut EP, Mindspeak, was released in March 2014 through Glassnote, accompanied by a short film directed by Nistico.

=== The Shape of Brat Pop to Come ===
Their first full-length debut album The Shape of Brat Pop to Come was released in June 2015 on Glassnote. Diller co-produced the LP with Grammy-nominated producers Greg Wells (Katy Perry, Adele) and Cian Riordan (5 Seconds of Summer, Keith Urban). The first single "Running Behind" appears on the global Apple Watch commercial.

=== America Oil Lamb (EP) ===
In June 2016, the duo released a collab EP on Glassnote Records. The single, Rotten Teeth, was released in May 2016 accompanied by a music video directed by Nistico and featuring drag queens and famous Mexican reality and YouTube stars. The EP itself features collaborations with Kate Nash, RAC, Tkay Maidza, Mereki, MS MR, and Kitten. "We felt we could stretch more on this record, since each song is a collaboration," Diller said about the release. "It was fun to explore and show different sides of us on the EP…I think Liz's voice and me producing/mixing most everything helps tie it together though, so there's still a HOLYCHILD vibe."

=== Return from hiatus (2018) ===
After a two-year hiatus, HOLYCHILD began releasing new music in 2018 starting with Wishing You Away in July. The single, which dealt with domestic abuse in Nistico's childhood, started a trend of personal song topics for the band. Hundred Thousand Hearts is a love song, Carmelo is a song about sexual assault, and Bathroom Bitch is a provocative, feminist anthem about sex. On September 5, 2019 they released Over You, a song with new sonic elements that had been in production for several years.

=== The Theatrical Death of Julie Delicious ===
On October 15, 2019, the band announced that their second studio album, The Theatrical Death of Julie Delicious, will be released on November 8, 2019. On October 24, 2019 they released Raining Romance, the fifth single from their upcoming album. The album is ten tracks long featuring five new tracks: Number One, Haunt Me in the Night, Fight For Me, Patron Saint and Saturday.

=== Indefinite hiatus ===
On December 18, 2019, the duo announced on social media that their upcoming tour would be their final performances for an "indefinite period of time." Nistico stated: "We're both working and collaborating together on our solo stuff -- we don't know when we will do stuff together again, but I'm sure we will."
