= Pumpkin Soup =

2007 single by Kate Nash

Single by Kate Nash

from the album Made of Bricks
- B-side: "Pistachio Nut (Poem)"; "Pumpkin Soup (Live at Cardiff Solus)"
- Released: 17 December 2007
- Genre: Pop, indie pop
- Length: 2:59 (album version)
- Label: Fiction
- Songwriters: Kate Nash, Paul Epworth
- Producer: Paul Epworth

Kate Nash singles chronology
"Mouthwash" (2007)	"Pumpkin Soup" (2007)	"Merry Happy" (2008)

Music video
- "Pumpkin Soup" on YouTube

"Pumpkin Soup" is a song by Kate Nash that is featured on her fourth single, the third to be lifted from her debut album Made of Bricks. It was released on 17 December 2007, making it a contender for the Christmas number one and entered the charts at number 58 on the UK Singles Chart based on downloads only, then reached number 40 with a physical release the following week. It reached a peak of number 23 on 6 January, equalling the peak of previous single "Mouthwash". The song spent total 10 weeks on the UK Singles Chart.

== Background and writing ==
Nash stated in an interview on BBC Radio 1 that the title "Pumpkin Soup" was a working title she had saved on her computer when writing early versions of the song, and that her record company had originally intended to name it "I Just Want Your Kiss" after the main lyric in the song.

== Critical reception ==
Pitchfork wrote "Pumpkin Soup is one of the few Made of Bricks tracks that finds Nash's acutely enunciated words complemented with just the right amount of swirling sonic accoutrements".

== Track listings ==
All songs written by Kate Nash, except "Pumpkin Soup", written by Kate Nash and Paul Epworth.

UK CD
No.	Title	Writer(s)	Length
1.	"Pumpkin Soup"	Nash	2:59
2.	"Pistachio Nut" (Poem)	Nash	4:10

UK Vinyl 1
No.	Title	Writer(s)	Length
1.	"Pumpkin Soup"	Nash	2:59
2.	"Pumpkin Soup" (Live from Cardiff Solus)	Nash	5:42

UK Vinyl 2
No.	Title	Writer(s)	Length
1.	"Pumpkin Soup"	Nash	2:59

Side B has no music, but an etched print instead.

European Maxi CD
No.	Title	Writer(s)	Length
1.	"Pumpkin Soup"	Nash	2:59
2.	"Foundations" (Live from the Spring and Airbrake, Belfast)	Nash
3.	"Pumpkin Soup" (Live from Cardiff Solus)	Nash	5:42
4.	"Pumpkin Soup" (Russell Bloc Party's Team Tiger Edit)	Nash	3:36
5.	"Pumpkin Soup (Video)"	Nash

European Maxi CD
No.	Title	Writer(s)	Length
1.	"Pumpkin Soup"	Nash	2:59
2.	"Foundations" (Live from the Spring and Airbrake, Belfast)	Nash

Digital Download
No.	Title	Writer(s)	Length
1.	"Pumpkin Soup" (Russell Bloc Party's Team Tiger Edit)	Nash	3:36
Total length:			3:36

== Music video ==
The music video for "Pumpkin Soup" was directed by Kinga Burza and sees Nash in an oversized novelty world inhabited by giant cats and bright colours, and is titled as by "Little Red Productions", a reference to the final track of Made of Bricks, "Little Red".

The video also features her and a boy in a kissing booth, which reflects the chorus lyric "I just want your kiss, boy," and main props include Love Hearts and bears. The character of "Boy" is played by Nash's real-life friend, photographer Wesley Goode.

== Charts ==
Chart (2007–2008)	Peak position
Australia (ARIA)	93
Austria (Ö3 Austria Top 40)	72
Belgium (Ultratip Bubbling Under Flanders)	23
Germany (GfK)	83
Ireland (IRMA)	40
UK Singles (Official Charts)	23
