= Germ (song) =

2025 single by Kate Nash

Single by Kate Nash
- Released: 28 May 2025
- Genre: Spoken word; pop-punk
- Length: 5:06
- Label: Kill Rock Stars
- Songwriter: Kate Nash
- Producer: Kool Kojak

Kate Nash singles chronology
"Slushy" (2025)	"Germ" (2025)

"Germ" is a song recorded by English singer-songwriter Kate Nash. It was released by Kill Rock Stars on 28 May 2025. Nash originally wrote the song as an essay, but after a UK Supreme Court ruling that determined that the word "woman" refers to biological sex, excluding trans women and including trans men, she decided to turn the essay into a song. The title, "Germ", is a term coined by Nash that rebrands a TERF as a "girl, exclusionary, regressive, misogynist".

Throughout "Germ", Nash's commentary explores numerous social issues, including her reaction to transphobia, her support of trans people, violence and sexual assault against women in the UK, female genital mutilation, forced marriage, abuse, men's mental health and suicide rates, gender roles and toxic masculinity. Nash also included facts and figures to back up her views, including suicide rates and rape statistics. Despite receiving trolling from gender-critical people about the song, "Germ" and Nash received critical acclaim and praise from the LGBTQ community for her outright support of the community during a difficult period.

== Background and composition ==
Nash initially wrote "Germ" as an essay in mid-2024. After a Supreme Court ruling in April 2025 determined that the word 'woman' refers only to "biological women", Nash messaged producer Kool Kojak. The pair turned her essay into a song, with Nash wanting to put her thoughts on the record. A British public figure, Nash deemed it important to speak out against Harry Potter author J.K. Rowling, who had become known for her explicitly transphobic views. Nash long had an interest in spoken word and poetry, feminism, and politics. Therefore, she was keen to incorporate it into her work and felt that making a song about her thoughts on feminism would be more impactful than reacting on her phone.

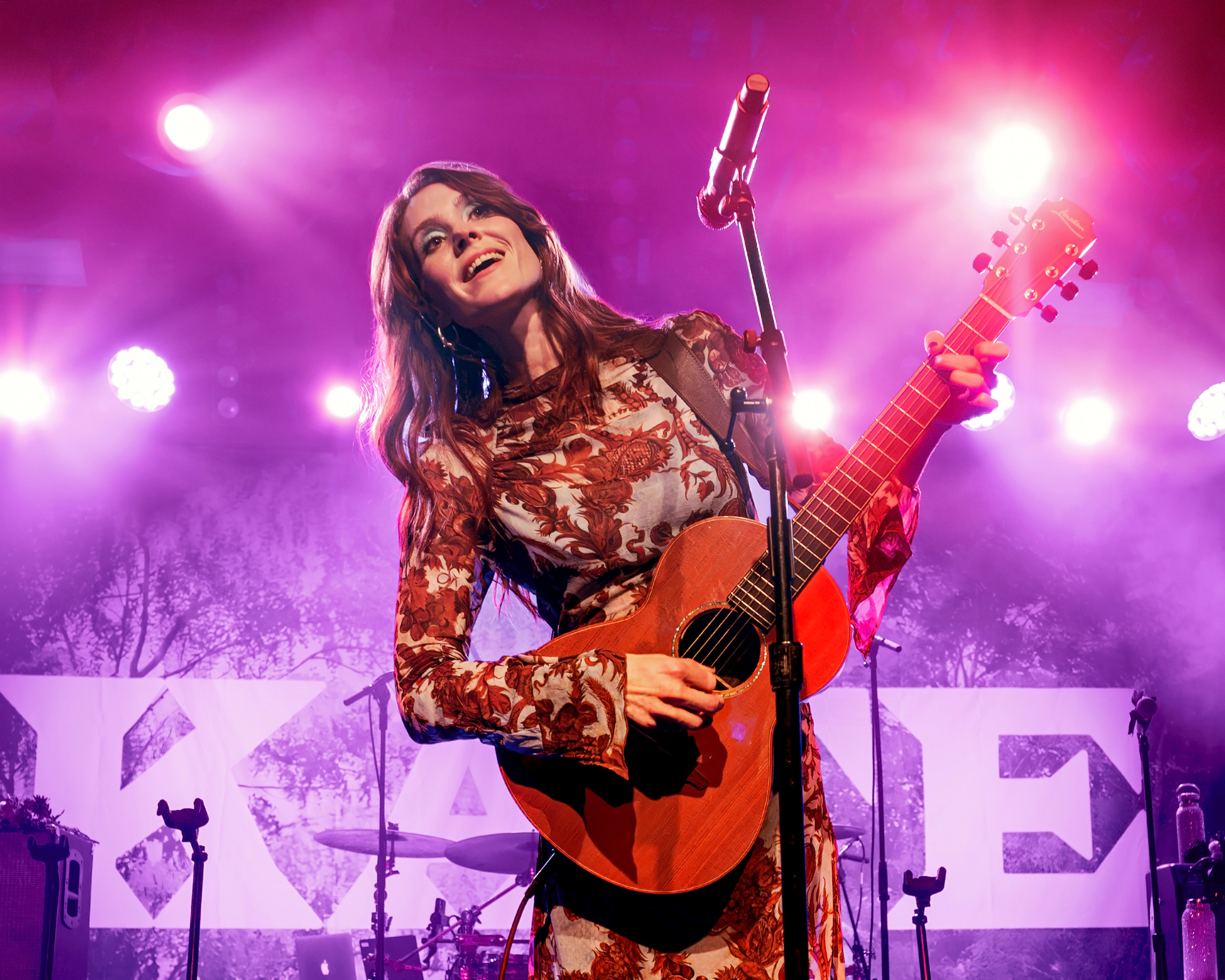
On making "Germ", Nash said: "I want this on record. I want it to exist in music history that a feminist, cis woman was pro-trans and a trans ally and calling out transphobia".

"Germ" is an acronym for "girl, exclusionary, regressive, misogynist", a term coined by Nash as a replacement for a trans-exclusionary radical feminist (TERF). The lyrical content of "Germ" explores various social themes: her reaction to transphobic views, her support of trans people, violence and sexual assault against women in the UK, female genital mutilation, forced marriage, abuse, men's mental health and suicide rates, gender roles and toxic masculinity. As well as showcasing her feelings on the topics, she also backed up her thoughts with statistics from numerous sources, including Rape Crisis and the End Violence Against Women Coalition. Within the lyrics of the song, she remarks that "women are facing serious dangers", but not from "trans people needing a piss".

Nash wrote the song hoping that "Germ" would form part of a reshape of British feminism, having felt embarrassed to call herself a feminist after the Supreme Court ruling. She subsequently criticised white feminism on the grounds that excluding trans women from feminism evoked the historical exclusion of Black women. The track featured on an EP in November 2025 that featured an acoustic live version and remixes from Peaches, Bimini, Charlieeeee and Jaguar.

== Reception ==
Within hours of the song's release, Nash had received praise from LGBTQ+ advocates and allies for showing support at a time when their rights were receding and was trending on Twitter. Anti-trans social media posters claimed that Nash was enabling abusers by calling for trans women to be accepted in single-sex spaces, which Nash found "absurd", saying "Men do not have to Mrs. Doubtfire it to rape and kill us. They can just do that and that is what they do." Nash said that she was open to nuanced conversations but was shocked to be described as "old, a bint, a slag, a has-been", insults she called juvenile and misogynistic.

PinkNews billed "Germ" a "searing takedown of so-called trans-exclusionary radical feminism, with rage vibrating through every scratchy guitar thrum." Nash spoke with the newspaper about the public reaction to the song. She explained that she had received high volumes of trolling about the song and admitted that it worried her.

== Credits and personnel ==
Credits adapted from Spotify.

- Kate Nash – vocals, songwriting
- Kool Kojak – production

== Charts ==
Chart performance for "Germ"
Chart (2025)	Peak position
UK Singles Downloads (Official Charts)	100

== Release history ==
Region	Date	Format	Label	Ref.
Various	28 May 2025	Digital download; streaming	Kill Rock Stars	
