= Kate Nash =

British musician (born 1987)

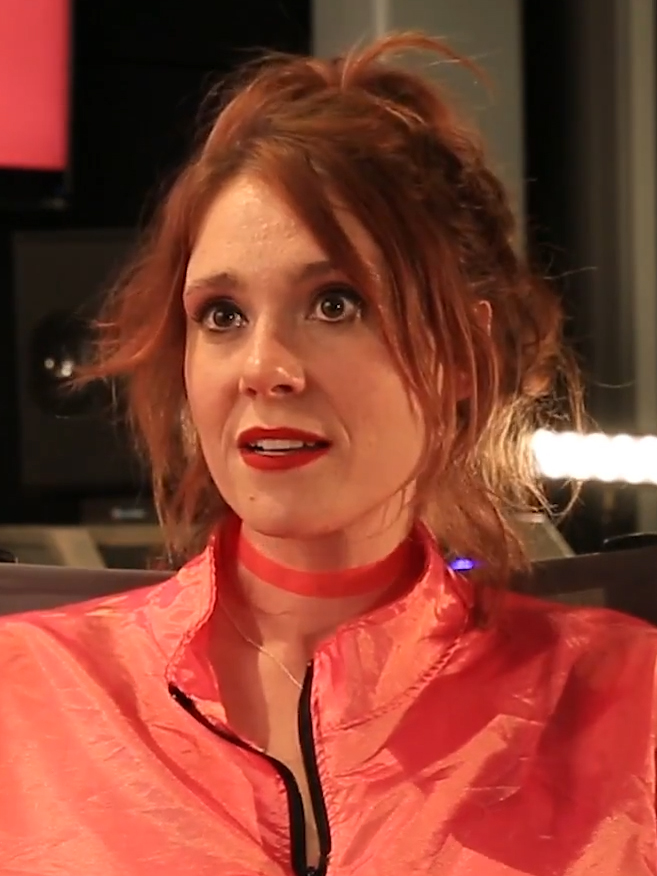
- Nash in 2017

Background information
- Born: Kate Marie Nash; 6 July 1987 (age 39); North Harrow, London, England
- Genres: Pop; alternative; rock; indie; punk
- Occupations: Singer; songwriter; musician; actress
- Instruments: Vocals; guitar; bass; piano
- Works: Discography
- Years active: 2006–present
- Labels: Moshi Moshi; Fiction; Have 10p; Kill Rock Stars
- Website: katenash.com

Kate Marie Nash (born 6 July 1987) is an English singer, songwriter, musician, and actress. Her singles "Foundations" (2007) and "Do-Wah-Doo" (2010) charted at numbers 2 and 15 on the UK singles chart and her albums Made of Bricks (2007) and My Best Friend Is You (2010) charted at numbers 1 and 8 on the UK Albums Chart.

An attempt at diversifying her sound from indie pop prompted her record label to drop her and she released three subsequent EPs and her third and fourth albums, Girl Talk (2013) and Yesterday Was Forever (2018), on her own label. A fifth album, 9 Sad Symphonies, was released on Kill Rock Stars in 2024. Nash co-wrote "Poison", a hit for Rita Ora, and featured on works by Lethal Bizzle, Kano, Fidlar, Watsky, Holychild, Baby Dave, and Soft Play.

Aside from music, Nash played Rhonda "Britannica" Richardson in the Netflix comedy-drama series GLOW (2017–2019) and has appeared in the films Greetings from Tim Buckley (2012), Powder Room (2013), Syrup (2013), Horrible Histories: The Movie – Rotten Romans (2019), and Coffee Wars (2023).

== Early life ==
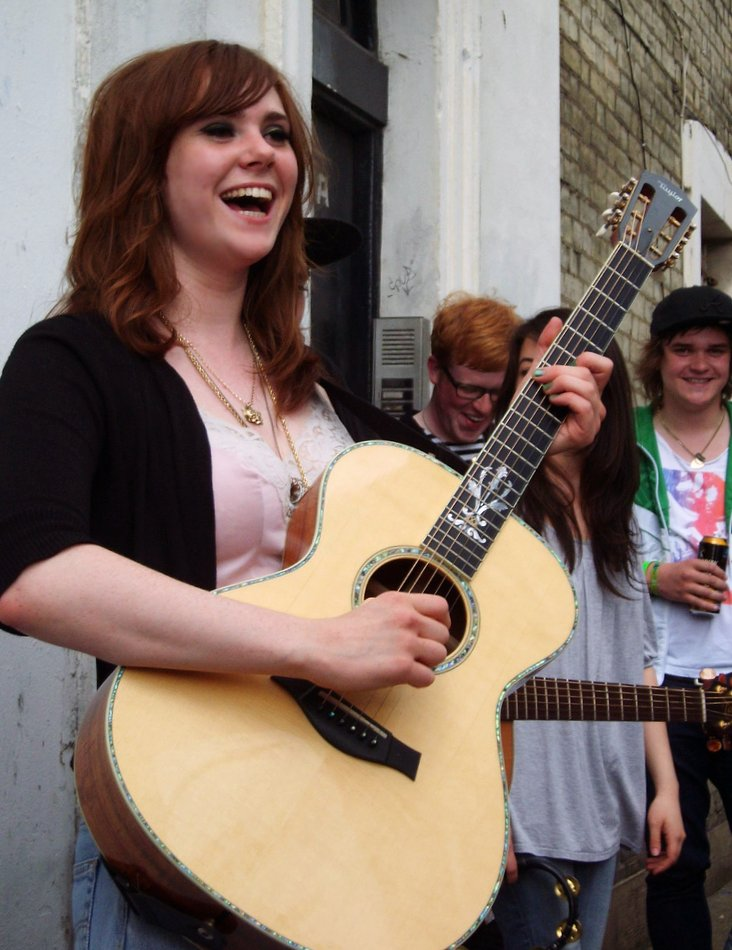
Nash performing in 2007

Kate Marie Nash was born on 6 July 1987 in North Harrow in London and grew up in the town's Irish community. She was the second of three daughters to a hospice nurse mother from Dublin, Ireland, and a systems analyst father from Dartford, England. She began playing the piano aged eight and writing music in her free time aged 15. She attended St John Fisher Catholic Primary School in Pinner, and enrolled on a theatre course at the BRIT School. She studied there until summer 2005, after which she took a gap year and applied unsuccessfully to several drama colleges.

In early 2006, on the day she received a rejection letter from Bristol Old Vic Theatre School, she fell down her home's staircase and had to spend several weeks recuperating, during which time her parents bought her an electric guitar and an amplifier and she uploaded several songs she recorded to MySpace. That April, she performed her debut gig at Trinity Bar in Harrow, for which she was paid £30; realising she could be paid for performing live, she quit her job at retailer River Island.

== Career ==
Lily Allen subsequently featured Nash's MySpace page in her "Top 8"; by January 2007, Nash had taken part in writing sessions featuring Paul Epworth, Valgeir Sigurðsson, and Allen collaborator Future Cut. She released her debut single, a double-A-side single comprising the industrial track "Caroline's a Victim" and the acoustic track "Birds", the following month on Moshi Moshi Records; she signed to the Polydor offshoot Fiction Records the month after that. Nash's second single, June 2007's "Foundations", spent five weeks at No. 2 on the UK singles chart behind Rihanna's "Umbrella" and Timbaland's "The Way I Are", once missing out on No. 1 by 16 copies. The success of the single prompted the label to bring forward the release of her debut album by five weeks.

Upon release in August 2007, Made of Bricks charted at No. 1 on the UK Albums Chart, having sold 56,000 copies in its first week. Made of Bricks was eventually certified Platinum in November 2007 by the British Phonographic Industry, and also charted at number 36 on the US Billboard 200 chart in January 2008. Among the album's tracks were "Birds", "Foundations", "Mouthwash", "Pumpkin Soup", and "Merry Happy", the last three of which were also released as singles; "Mouthwash" and "Pumpkin Soup" made the UK singles chart. Nash also won the Q Award for Breakthrough Artist in October 2007, the Best British Female Solo Artist award at the 2008 Brit Awards and the NME Award for Best Solo Artist in February 2008.

In July and August 2007, Nash featured on Lethal Bizzle's "Look What You Done" from his album Back to Bizznizz and Kano's "Me & My Microphone" from his album London Town. The year after, following relentless touring and a lack of nutrition on tour, Nash developed alcoholism and candidiasis and suffered a breakdown in Germany, prompting her to take a year out, during which she developed obsessive–compulsive disorder. She cut out wheat and dairy on the advice of a specialist and then meat before moving into a rented flat in Bethnal Green she later bought with her boyfriend Ryan Jarman, who she met in 2007. She also spent time working at a refuge for survivors of domestic violence and self-harm. Jarman later introduced her to Bernard Butler, who she began recording her second album with August 2009. She subsequently began playing bass guitar in The Receeders, a punk band formed with two men who were supporting her solo content.

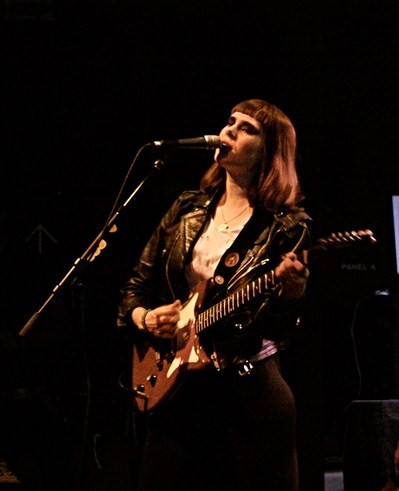
Nash performing in 2010

In February 2010, Nash released "I Just Love You More" as a free download from her official website. She released a music video for "Do-Wah-Doo" in March 2010, with the song receiving a physical release the month after; the track made No. 15 on the UK singles chart. Both "I Just Love You More" and "Do-Wah-Doo" appeared on her second studio album My Best Friend Is You, which made the UK Albums Chart at No. 8 in April but left the chart quickly; the album also contained "Kiss That Grrrl" and "Later On", which were subsequently released as singles. To promote the record, Nash embarked on a series of smallscale gigs, which lacked Nash's hits and caused walkouts; subsequent gigs were received more positively and featured Supercute! as an opening act.

=== 2011–2014: Change of musical direction ===
In April 2011, she set up Have 10p Records, an extension of an earlier performing arts trust fund she had set up which had funded works by Sarah Solemani and Brigitte Aphrodite; Aphrodite and her single "I Dream Myself Awake" became the label's first signee and release. Nash released a cover of "Last Christmas" with Jarman in December 2011, though broke up with him shortly after. By August 2011, Nash had signed to Greetings from Tim Buckley, a film about Tim and Jeff Buckley, which premiered at the 2012 Toronto International Film Festival. She wrote her third album between August 2011 and February 2012 in her Bethnal Green studio and recorded it in Paramour Mansion in Los Angeles in March. She recorded the album and several music videos at her expense as Fiction Records had told her they would reimburse her after her contract was renegotiated.

Nash contributed a cover of Cub's "My Chinchilla", then a regular in her setlists, to the March 2012 Nardwuar and The Evaporators' album Busy Doing Nothing!. By June 2012, Nash was best known for gentle indie pop music. That month, Nash embarked on a 12-date Faster Pussycat Run Run Tour across the UK and released the song "Under-Estimate the Girl" for free on her website, which she had written, recorded, and made a video for in under 24 hours. The punk rock track received mostly negative feedback and compelled Fiction Records to drop her in August 2012. That summer, she had recorded a small role for Syrup with Aram Rappaport, who subsequently directed the music videos shot for her third album; the film was released the following year. By October 2012, she had covered Fidlar's "Cocaine"; that month, she featured on their track "Awwwkwaarrrddd" and appeared as Buffy in a production of the Buffy the Vampire Slayer episode "Once More, with Feeling" at Hackney Picturehouse.

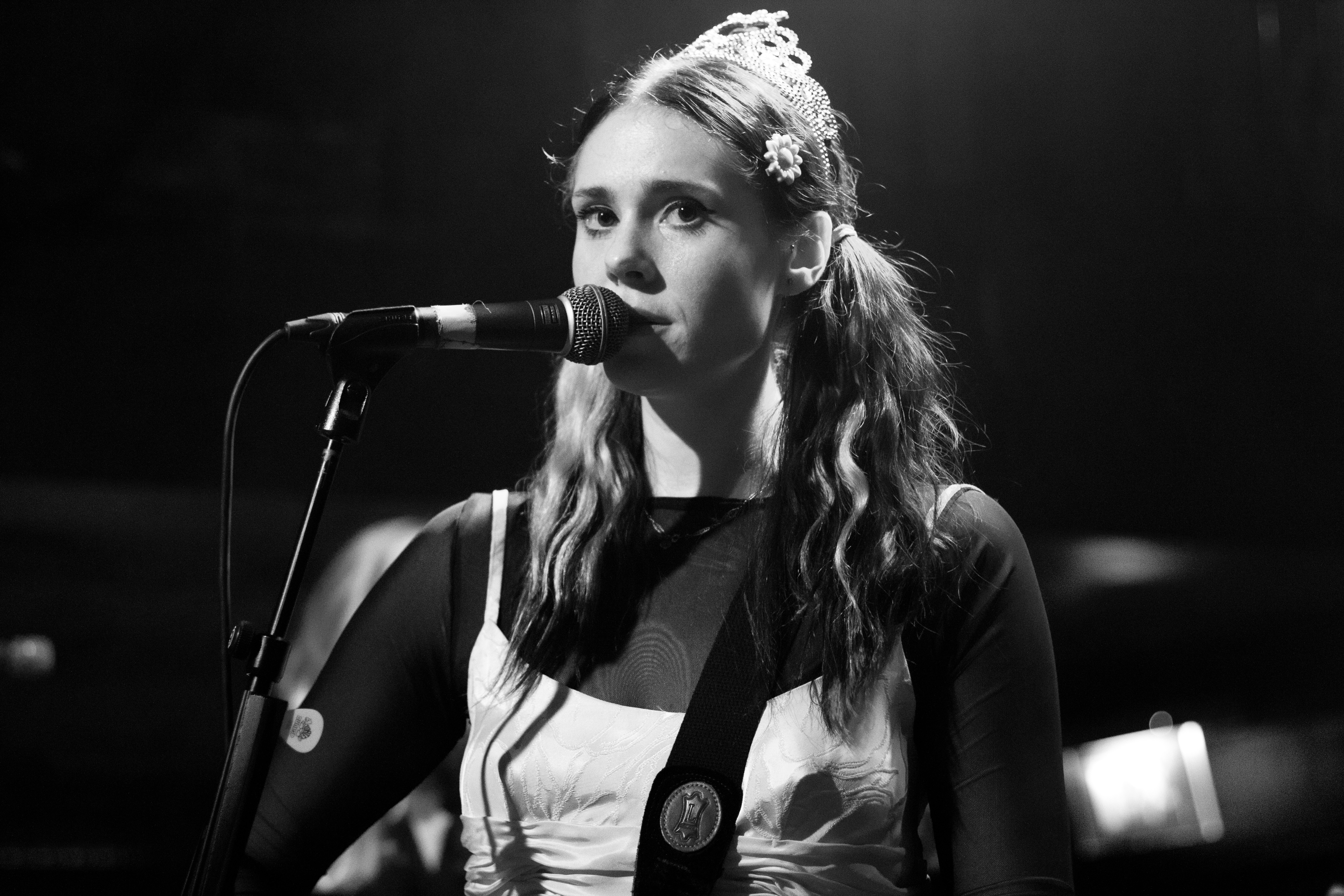
Nash performing in Amsterdam, 2012

She announced and released on Have 10p Records the EP Death Proof in November 2012, a stopgap between her second and third albums. The EP comprised five tracks including a slower take on The Kinks's "All Day and All of the Night" and the title track, which had been written about a heart condition Nash had suffered as a teenager. The EP was promoted with videos for "Fri-End?" and the title track and funded by PledgeMusic, a service artists used to sell goods and services. Emily Barker of NME wrote in July 2013 that Nash offered on PledgeMusic "a recording of your favourite children's book/short and/or ghost story (£350), a pampering mani/pedicure date (£400), or a 'Kate + cake + acoustic live songs combo' (£2,000)", among other things.

Nash released the Christmas song "Faith" in December 2012, by which time she had filmed for the film Powder Room, which was released in December 2013. In February 2013, she released her own single "3AM" and featured on Watsky's "Hey, Asshole". By that March, she had written Willow Smith's "I Am Me" and had produced the bulk of an album for Supercute!. That month, they released "Love Love Leave Love" from the album and she released her third full-length studio album, Girl Talk. Released through Have 10p Records, it incorporated elements of punk rock and featured the tracks "Death Proof", "3AM", "Fri-End", and "OMyGod!", the last of which was subsequently remixed for single release.

For Record Store Day 2013, she released "Free My Pussy" on heart-shaped vinyl, backed with "Free Pussy Riot Now!". She subsequently released a video for the former. By December, she had released the Christmas EP Have Faith with Kate Nash This Christmas, which featured "Faith" and a track by The Tuts. That April, she and many others (Note: Tavi Gevinson, Suzy X., Kimya Dawson, Psalm One, Katie Crutchfield, MNDR, Thao Nguyen, Geneviève Castrée, Storey Littleton, Carrie Brownstein, Tegan and Sara, Dee Dee Penny, Ted Leo, Aimee Mann, Katy Davidson, and Marianna Ritchey.) featured on "Go Forth, Feminist Warriors", a track released as the theme for the teen blog Rookie. In July 2014, she appeared in the advert The Distortion of Sound, which discussed declining sound quality caused by streaming, and uploaded to SoundCloud the track "She Rules", which was accompanied by a video she recorded on her iPhone.

=== 2014–2020: GLOW and Underestimate the Girl ===
"I had horrible meetings with labels and they made me feel worthless. They were like 'is this what Kate Nash looks like now?' They were asking me about my looks and if I'm going to make this kind of music forever because they don't really get me. I found that really fucking offensive. It was really judgmental. This is what I look like now; what the fuck do you mean? [...] I had a record label offer me a deal for no money. Seriously, do you expect me to sign that? That was really embarrassing and a blow to my ego; I felt like I'm literally worth nothing to the industry, like my career was over. I felt very lost."

— Nash in 2018

Nash moved to Los Angeles in January 2014. After suffering from loneliness as a result of not having a label and finding that touring was expensive without a backer, she sought a new label, but took offense at the way she was treated in meetings. Later that year, she signed a publishing deal with Warner Chappell Music and co-wrote a number of songs as part of writing rooms including "Poison" with Julia Michaels, but found the experience demoralising. "Poison" was later a hit for Rita Ora. In March 2015, she played Bridget Bishop in the HBO pilot Devil You Know, which had been written by Jenji Kohan about the Salem witch trials but left unaired. That year, after finding that her manager had misappropriated her money to pay for his wedding and left her almost bankrupt, she moved back to her parents's house in London and sold her belongings for survival. She later settled with her manager out of court.

Later that year, Nash returned to LA after Kohan offered her a part in a subsequent series, which would become Rhonda "Brittanica" Richardson of GLOW, a Netflix series based on the 1980s TV series GLOW: The Story of the Gorgeous Ladies of Wrestling. Richardson was based on the latter series's Godiva, a British character played by Dawn Maestas. The cast were taught how to wrestle by Chavo Guerrero Jr. specifically for the series and Nash stopped drinking alcohol as part of the fitness regimen. She has stated that the show was the first project she worked on that had a human resources department and has credited her nude scenes with increasing her body confidence. First broadcast in June 2017 and recommissioned for three further series, the COVID-19 pandemic shut down production midway through the second episode of series 4 and filming did not resume before the show's cancellation in October 2020.

Nash was featured on Holychild's "Rotten Teeth" in May 2016 and released a solo single that August, "Good Summer". She followed this in November with "My Little Alien", a track about her dog. In April 2017, she announced a Kickstarter campaign to finance a fourth studio album, which raised $155,000, and released "Call Me" and Agenda, a single and an EP. The latter featured four tracks including "My Little Alien", "Call Me", and a title track, for which a video was released in May. She then mounted a self-funded tour to mark the 10th anniversary of Made of Bricks as she associated the album with negative criticism from old men journalists, before releasing the singles "Drink About You" in February 2018 and "Life in Pink" that March. Later that month, she released her fourth studio album, Yesterday Was Forever; by the time of the album's release, Nash was living in Atwater Village. The album featured "My Little Alien" and "Call Me" from Agenda and the tracks "Drink About You", "Life in Pink", and "Hate You", the last of which Nash released a video for in September 2018.

Nash was the subject of the September 2018 documentary Kate Nash: Underestimate the Girl, which premiered that month at the LA Film Festival in September 2018. The 86-minute show depicted the aftermath of Made of Bricks, her move to Los Angeles, her temporary move back to London after being defrauded, and ends with Nash crowdfunding and releasing Yesterday Was Forever and then performing in front of a supportive audience. In October 2018, she signed on to play Boudica in Horrible Histories: The Movie – Rotten Romans, which premiered in July 2019. She then released the grunge song "Trash" in January 2019, in which she condemned environmental pollution.

=== 2020–2024: Only Gold and Coffee Wars ===
By April 2020, Nash had tired of regular social media and had created a Patreon account, which she used throughout the COVID-19 pandemic to livestream gigs. Nash started writing her fifth album that autumn over Zoom with previous collaborator Frederik Thaae. Nash and Thaae had completed the album by the end of 2021. She played Mary in Truth Seekers in October 2020; her participation had been announced a year earlier. In March 2021, she began hosting Kate Nash's Lovely Music Programme on the Highgate-based radio station Boogaloo Radio.

In May 2021, Nash released "Misery" and "Horsie" that September. Both were written about the lethargy she was suffering from during lockdown. The music video for "Horsie" had been shot at the Grand Canyon, one of several stops Nash had visited earlier that year on her Safely Out of the Bedroom tour, which she had streamed from places she found interesting such as national parks. Her music during this period was largely released whenever she felt like it, though her February 2022 single "Imperfect" was specifically written for the Netflix series The Baby-Sitters Club. In March, Wild Bitch, an absurdist thriller she had created with her GLOW co-star Rebekka Johnson and contributed music for, premiered at SXSW's Midnight Shorts Competition. The pair later collaborated again on the same basis for Bad Rabbit, which was released that October.

In August 2022, she released a new single, "Wasteman", with a music video starring Danny Dyer, his daughter Sunnie, and Gaby Diaz. Only Gold a musical she had developed with Andy Blankenbuehler and Ted Malawer since 2010, premiered at the MCC Theater in New York City, where it ran for three weeks. Directed and choreographed by Blankenbuehler and set in Paris in 1928, the show focused on a rebellious princess, queen, and clockmaker's wife and also features their men chasing their childhood dreams. Only Gold featured copious quantities of songs by Nash, who also wrote songs specifically for the musical and narrated it.

In March 2023, Nash appeared in Coffee Wars. She played Jo, a struggling coffee shop owner who entered the World Barista Championship, and had been explicitly hired due to her veganism, having adopted the practice in July 2017 after watching Okja. In June 2023, she directed a video for Skating Polly's "Tiger at the Drugstore"; the following month, she released a feature on Baby Dave's "Telephobia". In August 2023, she produced and occasionally appeared in the Edinburgh Fringe run of The Retreat, a stage show by Johnson and Parks and Recreation actress Anne Gregory.

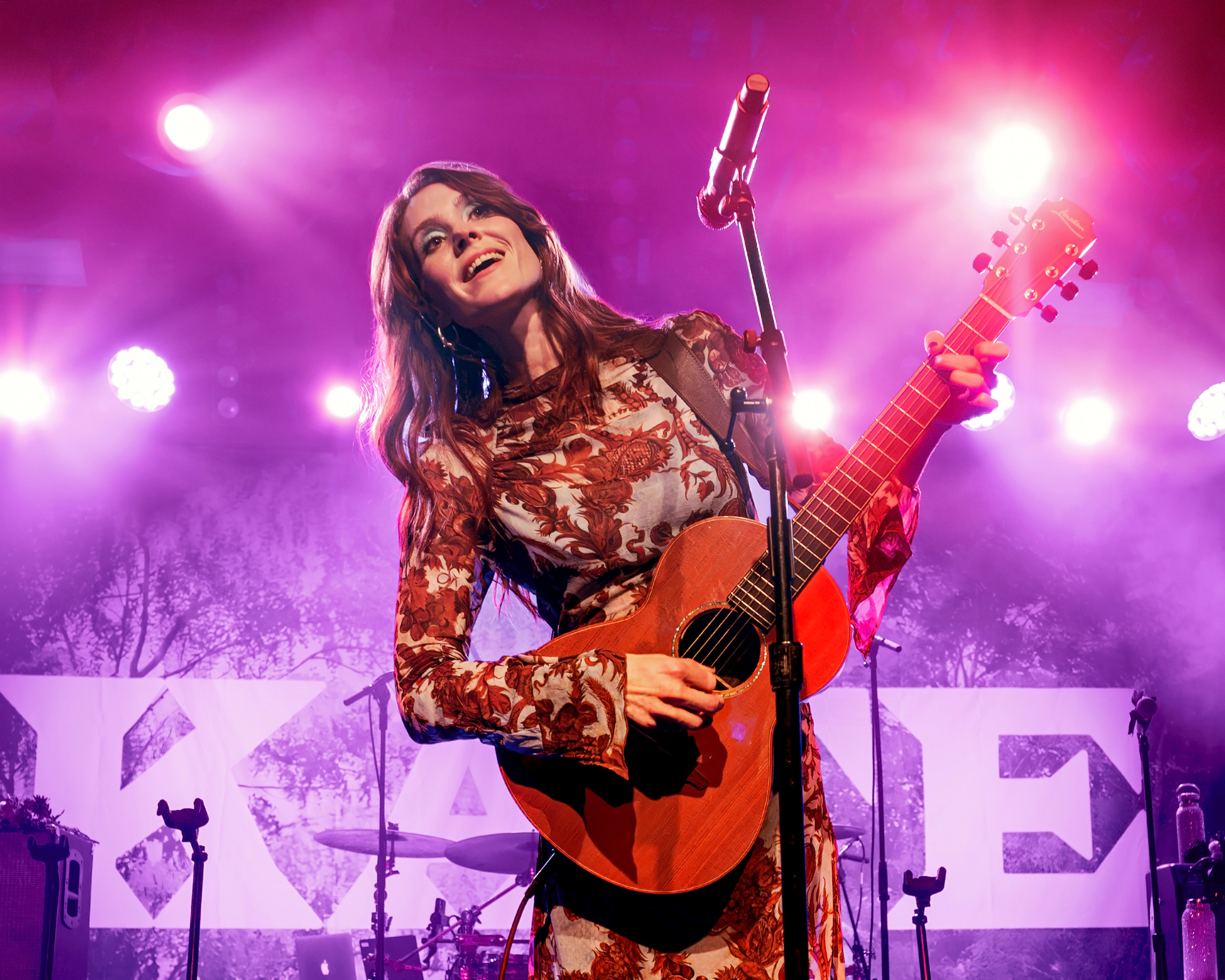
Nash in November 2024

In February 2024, Nash announced that she had signed to Kill Rock Stars, her first label in a decade, who simultaneously released her single "Change". In subsequent months, Nash released the singles "Millions of Heartbeats", "Space Odyssey 2001", and "My Bile". She released her fifth album 9 Sad Symphonies in June 2024, which comprised ten tracks. The album was promoted with a tour of North America and Europe, by which time she had become a naturalized citizen of the United States.

=== 2024-present: "GERM" and The Masked Singer ===
In July 2024, Nash modelled a Charlotte Colbert shirt for Lewes F.C. Women, which had been made as part of their "See Us As We Are" campaign, which aimed to tackle misogyny within football. She released "Eyeconic" in September, a track inspired by the club and the campaign and about the history of women's football in England, and featured on "Slushy" in March 2025, a Soft Play single from their album Heavier Jelly.

In May 2025, Nash released the single "Germ", which she had written as an essay and then set to music in response to the result of a recent ruling by the Supreme Court of the United Kingdom. "Germ" took its name from an acronym for "girl, exclusionary, regressive, misogynist", which Nash coined as an alternative to TERF, and addressed multiple social issues including domestic abuse, men's mental health, and transphobia. The track went viral shortly after release, causing Nash to suffer abuse. She then released an EP in November featuring a live acoustic version and remixes from Peaches, Charlieeeee, Bimini Bon-Boulash, and Jaguar.

Nash used an appearance at 2025's Glastonbury to criticise multiple celebrities and an appearance at a Transgender Day of Remembrance vigil to highlight increased crime rates against trans people. She appeared as a contestant on the seventh series of The Masked Singer in January 2026 as "Monkey Business", where she was fifth to be unmasked; among her performances was one of "As Long as He Needs Me" from Oliver!. She performed "Germ" at the March 2026 benefit concert Trans Mission and released a version of Sinéad O'Connor's Universal Mother track "Famine" the month after.

== Artistry ==
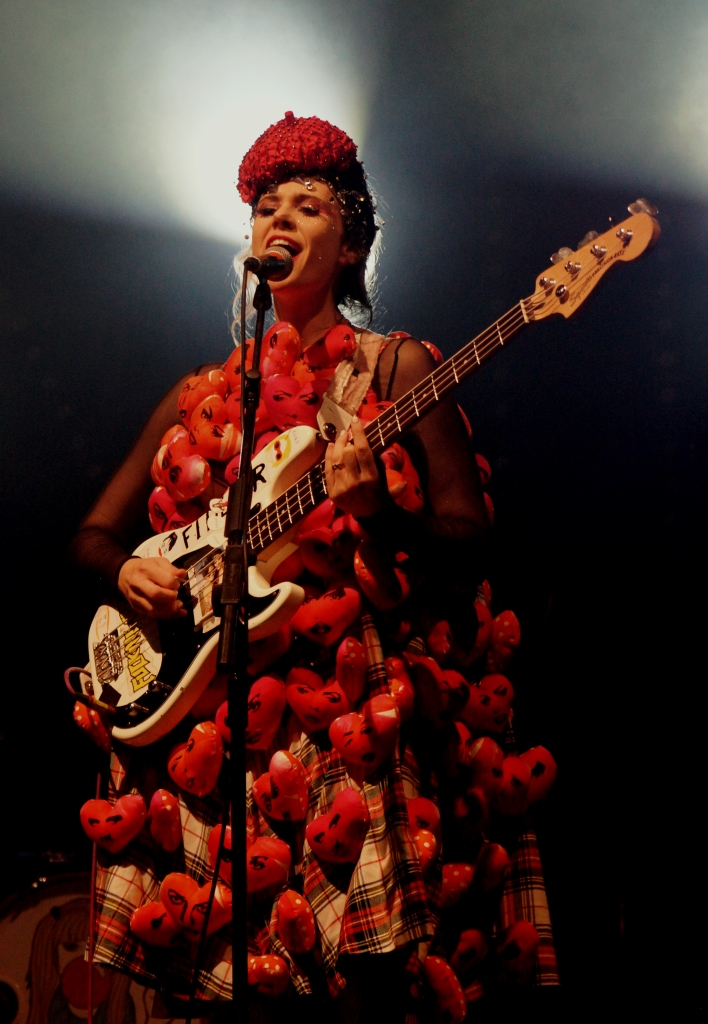
Nash performing at Manchester Pride, 2013

When Nash started out, she was frequently compared to Lily Allen, as both sang with London accents. Nash has stated that she considers such comparisons lazy and sexist. Nash's success was the subject of ridicule by tabloids, which wrote about her hair, clothes, and weight and regularly featured her pimples in sidebars of shame. Her lyrics were frequently criticised for their mundanity and her music was described by the Daily Mail as "Little Britain's Vicky Pollard set to cheap synths". In April 2007, elements of "Caroline's a Victim" and Allen's "LDN" were parodied as "LDN Is a Victim" by an anonymous MySpace rapper, which mocked many successful London artists of the time and accused Nash of affecting her working-class image.

in July 2019, Nash stated that Buzzcocks were the reason she began writing songs due to their ordinary topic matter; she also stated in that interview that she was influenced by Celine Dion, the Spice Girls, Nirvana, Misteeq, the Beatles, and UK garage. My Best Friend is You was influenced by punk music and 1960s girl groups, while Girl Talk was influenced by riot grrrl and Yesterday Was Forever was influenced by Pink, Blink-182, and Sum 41. Wild Bitch was inspired by Wendy Carlos's score for The Shining, while 9 Sad Symphonies was inspired by musical theatre and "Imperfect" was inspired by female pop singers of her teenage years, such as Stacie Orrico, Michelle Branch, Vanessa Carlton, and Ashlee Simpson.

== Personal life ==
Nash has stated that she is bisexual and that she is attracted to men and women as people for who they are. In March 2009, she became one of the founding members of Featured Artists' Coalition, and supported the Office of Fair Trading's Just Tick It campaign that September. After releasing her second album, Nash spent her time visiting schools and donating instruments, and setting up the Kate Nash Rock 'N Roll for Girls After School Music Club. She was inspired to do the last of these by Kathleen Hanna, who had run similar in America, and after learning at a 2010 panel that 14% of songwriters registered with PRS for Music were women. She, Sam Duckworth, two of the Kaiser Chiefs, and Emmy the Great batted cleanup after the August 2011 London riots.

In August 2012, she, Jarvis Cocker, Johnny Marr, and Alex Kapranos all signed a letter calling on Vladimir Putin to release Pussy Riot from prison; later that month, she and several other musicians (Note: The Knife, Lykke Li, Peter Bjorn and John, Nick Zinner, The Hives, Miike Snow, Le Tigre's JD Samson, and others.) appeared in a Peaches video supporting Pussy Riot. Nash also became a global ambassador for Because I Am a Girl in January 2013, with whom she later mounted her own campaign, Protect a Girl; her campaign was named with the intention of gaining support from men.

In 2015, Nash set up Girl Gang, a YouTube and Tumblr community encouraging people like her to be themselves. After BuzzFeed listed Nash at number nine on a 2017 listicle titled "33 Singers That Only Exist In The Memories Of British Millennials", she responded passionately on Twitter, prompting BuzzFeed to defend the article as tongue-in-cheek. In 2019, she became an ambassador for Keychange, a PRS-funded initiative campaigning for gender equality in music festivals.

In 2021, having been inspired by the collapse of Burger Records and her own poor sex education, she set up Safety Chain, which aimed to teach sex education to those in the music industry. In November 2024, after discovering that her 9 Sad Symphonies Tour was making a loss, she announced that she was selling pictures of her buttocks on OnlyFans to subsidise its losses; her account was marketed with the slogan "Butts for Tour Buses".

By March 2025, her account had diversified into pay-per-view feet content and comedic food-based erotica. As part of the campaign, and in collaboration with Save Our Scene, she protested outside the offices of Spotify and Live Nation Entertainment to raise awareness of their profits. In February 2025, she became a patron of Music Venue Trust and urged her fans to fill out a survey by Music Fans's Voice, a review of the live music industry.

== Discography ==
- Made of Bricks (2007)
- My Best Friend Is You (2010)
- Girl Talk (2013)
- Yesterday Was Forever (2018)
- 9 Sad Symphonies (2024)
- Cailín (2027)

== Filmography ==
Year	Title	Role	Notes
2008–24	Never Mind the Buzzcocks	Herself	Two episodes
2012	Greetings from Tim Buckley	Carol	Feature
2013	Syrup	Beth	Feature
2013	Powder Room	Michelle	Feature
2014	The Distortion of Sound	Herself	Documentary
2017–19	GLOW	Rhonda "Britannica" Richardson	Series
2018	Under-Estimate the Girl	Herself	Documentary
2019	Horrible Histories: The Movie – Rotten Romans	Boudicca	Feature
2020	Truth Seekers	Mary Coleford	Series
2022	Wild Bitch	Melanie Fischer	Short
2022	Bad Rabbit	Elspeth	Short
2023	Coffee Wars	Jo	Feature
2026	The Masked Singer	Monkey Business	Unmasked on episode 5
