= Girl Talk (Kate Nash album) =

Studio album by Kate Nash
- Released: 4 March 2013
- Genres: Indie rock; garage punk; punk rock; indie pop
- Length: 52:29
- Label: Have 10p Records/Fontana
- Producers: Tom Biller; Jeff Ellis

Kate Nash chronology
My Best Friend Is You (2010)	Girl Talk (2013)	Yesterday Was Forever (2018)

Singles from Girl Talk
- 1. "3AM" Released: 18 February 2013; 2. "OMYGOD!" Released: 9 July 2013; 3. "Fri-End?" Released: 21 October 2013; 4. "Sister" Released: 19 February 2014

Girl Talk is the third studio album by English singer-songwriter Kate Nash. Nash self-released the album under Have 10p Records along with Fontana in March 2013 after she raised money for the album on PledgeMusic. Girl Talk has received mixed to positive reviews from critics. Featuring a heavier rock-influenced sound, the album is a noticeable departure from her first two indie pop albums. Lyrically, it draws a lot of influence from the riot grrrl movement.

The vinyl LP version of the record was pressed by United Record Pressing in Nashville, TN.

== Production ==
The lyrics for the album's songs were written in 2011, and Nash wanted to record them as quickly as possible. Fiction Records, her record label at the time, however, wanted to slow down production and edit some of her songs to remove their "punky elements". Nash left Fiction Records and set up Have 10p Records to release the album. She paid for the production of the album through crowd funding on PledgeMusic. The album was recorded at The Paramour Mansion in Echo Park, Los Angeles. In January 2013, Nash announced she would release the album on 4 March, with the single "3AM" released on 18 February. Tom Biller produced the album and Jeff Ellis worked as the audio engineer.

A limited heart shaped vinyl of "Free My Pussy", one of the album's deluxe tracks, was also released.

== Lyrical content ==
The style of Girl Talk has been classified as indie rock and garage punk. Reviewers note the album has a feminist and female empowerment tone.

Nash has stated that Girl Talk was written in the context of the arrest of Pussy riot and the theme of female empowerment may be extended to any individuals who feel suppressed.

== Reception ==
Professional ratings
Aggregate scores
Source	Rating
Metacritic	63/100
Review scores
Source	Rating
AllMusic	3.5/5 stars
The A.V. Club	C+
Consequence of Sound	3/5 stars
MSN Music (Expert Witness)	A−
MusicOMH	2/5 stars
NME	7/10
Pitchfork	6.4/10
Rolling Stone	2/5 stars

At Metacritic, a review aggregator which assigns a normalized rating out of 100 to reviews from mainstream critics, the album received an average score of 63, which indicates "generally favorable reviews". The aggregator AnyDecentMusic? gave the album a 6.2/10 based on 12 reviews. The album charted at 85 on the UK Albums Chart in its opening week.

Writing for AllMusic, Matt Collar called the album "more like the D.I.Y.-debut of a new indie rock band than the third effort of an established singer/songwriter", but went on to say "she hasn't sacrificed any of the personal, intimate lyrics that marked the best of her early songs." Jenny Stevens of NME agreed with Collar, saying Girl Talk has "shouts" and "moments of intimacy". Matt Ryan of The A.V. Club noted that the tone of the album's songs moved "toward[s] more aggressive, moody rock" and further away from the tone of Nash's previous albums Made of Bricks and My Best Friend Is You. Christopher Monk of musicOMH agreed that the album "[put] clear blue water between the Nash of old [...] and the new Nash". He gave the album two out of five stars and said that Girl Talk's main problem was that its songs were "not, on the whole, any good."

== Chart performance ==
The album charted at number 85 on the UK Albums Chart in its first week of release.

Chart	Peak position
UK Albums (OCC)	85
German Albums Chart (Media Control)	55

== Track listing ==
All tracks are written by Kate Nash.

No.	Title	Length
1.	"Part Heart"	3:07
2.	"Fri-End?"	3:32
3.	"Death Proof"	2:23
4.	"Are You There Sweetheart?"	4:28
5.	"Sister"	4:18
6.	"OMYGOD!"	2:57
7.	"Oh" (featuring Siobhan Malhotra)	4:22
8.	"All Talk"	3:25
9.	"Conventional Girl"	4:25
10.	"3AM"	3:31
11.	"Rap for Rejection"	2:18
12.	"Cherry Pickin'"	3:00
13.	"Labyrinth"	3:29
14.	"You're So Cool, I'm So Freaky"	3:17
15.	"Lullaby for an Insomniac"	3:52

Deluxe edition bonus tracks
No.	Title	Length
16.	"Mermaid Blue"	3:34
17.	"Free My Pussy"	2:43
18.	"I'm a Feminist, You're Still a Whore"	4:17

Deluxe edition DVD
No.	Title	Length
1.	"Intro"
2.	"The Paramour Mansion"
3.	"Faster Pussycat Kill Kill! (Bristol-Oxford-Brighton)"
4.	"Girl Gang"
5.	"I'm So Cool, You're So Freaky"
6.	"The Agony Aunt Sessions, Girl Talk With Sarah Solemani"
7.	"Credits"

== Personnel ==
- Kate Nash – vocals, guitar, bass (all tracks except 2 and 9), drums (track 13)
- Carmen Vandenberg – guitar
- Fern Ford – drums (all tracks except 13)
- Emma Hughes – bass (tracks 2 and 9)
- Jay Malhotra – guitar (track 7)
- Tom Biller – production
- Jeff Ellis – engineering
- Emma Chitty – artwork
