= My Best Friend Is You =

Studio album by Kate Nash
- Released: 19 April 2010
- Studio: RAK Studios · Studio 355 (London)
- Genre: Indie pop, indie rock
- Length: 49:20
- Label: Geffen/Fiction
- Producer: Bernard Butler, Jay Malhotra, Kate Nash

Kate Nash chronology
Made of Bricks (2007)	My Best Friend Is You (2010)	Girl Talk (2013)

Singles from My Best Friend Is You
- 1. "Do-Wah-Doo" Released: 12 April 2010; 2. "Kiss That Grrrl" Released: 12 July 2010; 3. "Later On" Released: 18 October 2010; 4. "I've Got a Secret" Released: 20 March 2011

My Best Friend Is You is the second studio album by English singer-songwriter Kate Nash, released in the United Kingdom on 19 April 2010 and elsewhere on 20 April. On 13 April 2010, Nash appeared on John Kennedy's XFM show Xposure, where they did a track-by-track interview playing the whole of the album. The album spawned three official singles: the lead single "Do-Wah-Doo" achieved the most commercial success, charting respectively in European countries. "I've Got A Secret" was released as a promotional single and the fourth single overall.

== Singles ==
- "Do-Wah-Doo" was the first single from the album. Nash confirmed on her blog that she filmed the music video for the single on 18 February 2010; "I shot the video for Do-Wah-Doo last week on Thursday and it was so so much fun! The best fun I ever had on a video shoot. It stars a lot of my wonderful friends who are pretty much amazing. I wrote the treatment almost a year ago, it's a love story set on a plane in the late 50s, for some reason the idea has always been in my head." Nash also posted some pictures of the video shoot, showing her and her friends (including photographer and close friend Wesley Goode, who starred in Nash's video for "Pumpkin Soup") on a plane. The music video was available from 4 March 2010. The single charted at number 15 on the UK Singles Chart and number 36 in Ireland. The single also received a considerable amount of chart success in European countries such as Belgium and Germany.
- "Kiss That Grrrl" was the second single release. It follows the 60s-girlband theme that her recent singles have had, and nods to Nash's fondness to girl groups such as The Shirelles, the Chiffons and the Ronettes. It is also a reference to the riot grrrl scene of the early 1990s. The song received mixed reviews and the music video received generally negative reviews from critics. It was a commercial failure, charting just outside the top 200 on the UK Singles Chart.
- "Later On" was confirmed as the third single by Nash on her Facebook page, stating that she had filmed the video and thought it might be the best video yet. It was released on 18 October 2010 and promoted mainly through her UK tour on the week of the single's release.
- "I've Got a Secret" was issued as the fourth and final single from My Best Friend Is You, confirmed by Nash on her My Ignorant Youth blog. Nash stated that a physical vinyl single would be available, like "Later On", through the second leg of her UK tour, which began on 20 March 2011, entitled the After-School Club Tour. The single contains the b-side "Kate & Breasts Intro Duck Ton Song Tour 2010".

== Tracks ==
- "I Just Love You More" was made available on Nash's official website for free digital download. The song was previewed on radio station XFM, on which it received a mostly positive reaction from listeners.
- A demo version of "Don't You Want to Share the Guilt?" appeared as a B-side on the single "Merry Happy" from the previous album Made of Bricks.
- "I Hate Seagulls" and "Pickpocket" were both played at intimate venues in 2008 while Kate was still promoting the previous album. They were posted on YouTube and received many views before being confirmed as new tracks for the album.

== Reception ==
Professional ratings
Aggregate scores
Source	Rating
Metacritic	69/100
Review scores
Source	Rating
Allmusic	3/5 stars
Entertainment Weekly	(B+)
Drowned in Sound	(7/10)
The Guardian	4/5 stars
The Irish Times	(favorable)
Mojo	3/5 stars
NME	(7/10)
Pitchfork Media	(7.8/10)
Q	2/5 stars
Uncut	1/5 stars

The album was generally met with positive reviews from critics. At Metacritic, a review aggregator which assigns a normalized rating out of 100 from mainstream critics, the album received an average score of 69, which indicates "generally favorable reviews". Allmusic granted the album 3 stars out of 5, noting it sounded "professional" and compared the album's sound with Amy Winehouse's, yet also commented "the aim of much of [My Best Friend Is You] seems to be simply getting Kate Nash airplay without worrying overly much about a musical backing that suits her songwriting." Andrzej Lukowski of Drowned in Sound denotes confusion on the album sounding "both indie and universal" and called the album "rather daring" for a "mainstream album". The Guardian granted four out of five stars, praising Nash' growth as an artist. The Irish Times named the album their "Album of the Week" and called it "a considerable step from its predecessor".

== Artwork ==
The official artwork for the sleeve leaked on 17 March 2010 appearing first on Kuwaiti music blog Loft965.com.

On 9 April 2010, Nash took part in a timesonline.co.uk web chat. When asked a question about the album's artwork she replied:

"It's been pretty stressful getting all the artwork together on this album because I've cared so much about it and had so many ideas and wanted it to be perfect for my second record. I worked with a lady called Kate Gibb who does screen printing, we screen printed a bunch of photos and some of my own objects to create collages inspired by images that I collected and loved, they varied from the bauhaus art movement to punk and lo fi record covers because I love the simplicity in those. I've just got through all the final artwork and it was worth the hardwork because I love how it looks. I try to be as involved as possible in every single aspect of what I do so that it represents me properly and because it's fun and I care and I'm a control freak."

== Track listing ==
All tracks are written by Kate Nash.

No.	Title	Producer(s)	Length
1.	"Paris"	Bernard Butler	3:04
2.	"Kiss That Grrrl"	Butler	3:41
3.	"Don't You Want To Share The Guilt?"	Butler	5:05
4.	"I Just Love You More"	Butler	3:05
5.	"Do-Wah-Doo"	Butler	2:32
6.	"Take Me to a Higher Plane"	Butler	3:20
7.	"I've Got a Secret"	Butler	2:39
8.	"Mansion Song"	Jay Malholtra, Nash	3:22
9.	"Early Christmas Present"	Butler	3:08
10.	"Later On"	Butler	3:34
11.	"Pickpocket"	Butler	3:21
12.	"You Were So Far Away"	Butler	3:26
13.	"I Hate Seagulls" (Silence From 4:13 until 7:11 – then hidden track begins: "My Best Friend Is You")	Butler	8:50
Total length:			49:20

US iTunes bonus track
No.	Title	Producer(s)	Length
14.	"R n B Side"	Butler	2:16

Japanese bonus tracks
No.	Title	Producer(s)	Length
14.	"Grrrilla Munch"	Butler	3:12
15.	"R n B Side"	Butler	2:16
Total length:			5:28

Scrapbook Edition DVD
No.	Title	Length
1.	"I Wanna Be a Frozen Pea" (Interview)	14:43
2.	"Track-By-Track"	9:02
3.	"Tour Highlights" ("I Just Love You More" is the background song)	3:09

== Personnel ==
Primary musicians

- Kate Nash – vocals on all tracks; guitar on tracks 1, 3, 4, 5, 6, 9, 12 and 13; piano on tracks 5, 9, 10 and 11; percussion on tracks 5, 9, 11 and 14; keyboards on tracks 5, 9 and 11; drums on tracks 7 and 8; synthesizers on tracks 10 and 14; organ on track 10; string arrangements on tracks 1, 2, 3, 4 and 6; production and mixing on tracks 8 and 14; engineering assistance on track 9; engineering and mixing on track 14; art direction
- Jay Malhotra – bass on tracks 2, 3, 6 and 7; guitar on tracks 4, 7 and 10; glockenspiel and ukulele on track 3; production, engineering and mixing on track 8
- Bernard Butler – synthesizers on 4, 9, 10 and 11; bass on tracks 1, 5 and 9; bongos on tracks 5 and 10; organ on tracks 5 and 12; acoustic guitar on track 5; production, engineering and mixing on all tracks except 8 and 9
- Elliott Andrews – drums on all tracks except 8, 9 and 14
- Brett Alaimo – guitar on tracks 1, 2, 3, 4, 5, 6 and 7
- Ian Burdge – cello on tracks 1, 2, 3, 4, 6, 11 and 13

Additional musicians

- Jon Jackson – guitar on tracks 2, 6 and 7; bass on tracks 4 and 10
- Bruce White – viola on tracks 1, 2, 3, 4 and 6
- Ali Dods – violin on tracks 1, 2, 3, 4 and 6
- Everton Nelson – violin on tracks 1, 2, 3, 4 and 6
- Louisa Fuller – violin on tracks 1, 2, 3, 4 and 6
- Sonia Slany – violin on tracks 1, 2, 3, 4 and 6
- Sally Herbert – string arrangements on tracks 1, 2, 3, 4 and 6
- Ryan Jarman – violin solo on "My Best Friend Is You"

Production personnel

- Richard Woodcraft – engineering on all tracks except 8 and 9
- Robbie Nelson – engineering on all tracks except 8 and 9
- Adie Kaye – engineering assistance on all tracks
- Chris Potter – mastering

Additional personnel

- Mat Maitland – art direction
- Kate Gibb – artwork
- Clare Nash – photography

== Chart performance ==
The album charted respectively at number 8 and 26 on the UK Album Chart and the Irish Albums Chart in its first week, however quickly dropped in its second week to number 39 and 40. It charted at number 62 on the Billboard 200 and number 6 in the German Album Charts.

=== Weekly charts ===
Weekly chart performance for My Best Friend Is You
Chart (2010)	Peak position
Australian Albums (ARIA)	50
Austrian Albums (Ö3 Austria)	14
Belgian Albums (Ultratop Flanders)	35
Belgian Albums (Ultratop Wallonia)	64
Dutch Albums (Album Top 100)	47
European Top 100 Albums (Billboard)	28
French Albums (SNEP)	71
German Albums (Offizielle Top 100)	6
Greece Albums (IFPI)	28
Irish Albums (IRMA)	26
Scottish Albums (OCC)	13
Swiss Albums (Schweizer Hitparade)	23
UK Albums (OCC)	8
US Billboard 200	62

== Tour ==
On her website, Nash announced she would be touring from 26 May 2010, till end of 2010.

Date	City	Country	Venue
Europe
26 May 2010	Berlin	Germany	Astra
27 May 2010	Dresden	Germany	Alter Schlachthof
28 May 2010	Hamburg	Germany	Gr. Freiheit
30 May 2010	Landgraaf	Netherlands	Pinkpop
31 May 2010	Cologne	Germany	Essigfabrik
1 June 2010	Paris	France	La Cigalle
2 June 2010	Strasbourg	France	Le Laiterie
4 June 2010	Nürburgring	Germany	Rock am Ring
2 June 2010	Nuremberg	Germany	Rock im Park
7 June 2010	Amsterdam	Netherlands	Paradiso
8 June 2010	Brussels	Belgium	Botanique/Orangerie
10 June 2010	Salzburg	Austria	Rockhouse
11 June 2010	Nickelsdorf	Austria	Novarock Festival
25 June 2010	Gloucester	United Kingdom	Guildhall
26 June 2010	Glastonbury	United Kingdom	Glastonbury Festival
6 July 2010	London	United Kingdom	iTunes Festival
10 July 2010	Balado	United Kingdom	T in the Park, Kinross
11 July 2010	Naas	Ireland	Oxegen Racefestival
North America
17 July 2010	Chicago	United States	Lilith Fair
18 July 2010	Minneapolis	United States	Lilith Fair
20 July 2010	Indianapolis	United States	Lilith Fair
21 July 2010	Detroit	United States	Lilith Fair
Australia
1 August 2010	Woodford	Australia	Splendour in the Grass
4 August 2010	Melbourne	Australia	Corner Hotel
5 August 2010	Sydney	Australia	Metro Theatre
Europe
20 August 2010	Hasselt-Kiewit	Belgium Belgium	Pukkelpop
5 September 2010	Trinity	Jersey	Royal Jersey Showground
14 September 2010	Copenhagen	Denmark	VEGA
North America
22 November 2010	Mexico City	Mexico	José Cuervo Salón
South America
24 February 2011	Rio de Janeiro	Brazil	Circo Voador
25 February 2011	São Paulo	Brazil	HSBC Hall
27 February 2011	Buenos Aires	Argentina	Teatro Gran Rex
Europe
13 April 2011	Istanbul	Turkey	Babylon
20 April 2011	Glasgow	Scotland	O2 ABC Glasgow
