= Foundations (song) =

2007 single by Kate Nash

Single by Kate Nash

from the album Made of Bricks
- B-side: "Habanera"; "Navy Taxi"; "Old Dances"
- Released: 18 June 2007
- Genre: Indie pop
- Length: 4:05; 3:44 (clean radio edit)
- Label: Fiction
- Songwriters: Kate Nash; Paul Epworth; Steve DaMar
- Producer: Paul Epworth

Kate Nash singles chronology
"Caroline's a Victim" / "Birds" (2007)	"Foundations" (2007)	"Mouthwash" (2007)

Music video
- "Foundations" on YouTube

"Foundations" is a song by English singer-songwriter Kate Nash for her debut album, Made of Bricks (2007). It was released as the album's lead single in June 2007, her first single since signing with Fiction Records after the success of her debut single "Caroline's a Victim".

== Music and structure ==
The song is written in C major and uses the three main chords of the key C, F, and G as the riff, which is used as a simple eight bar ostinato. It follows the A-B-A-B-A-B-C-B pattern.

During the writing process, producer Paul Epworth suggested to Nash to write "something like 'Cheree' by Suicide", which has a similar chord progression.

== Music video ==
The music video was directed by Kinga Burza and makes use of video, still shots and stop motion animation. Colourful everyday items such as toothbrushes, shoes, socks and toys (one of which appears to be a Yellow Power Ranger) are prominent.

It follows the song closely, and is made up of several main scenes; Nash playing a card game, turning in bed, eating lemons ("you've said I must eat so many lemons, because I am so bitter"), sitting on a staircase, arm wrestling, decorating a cake and sitting in her lounge, but is not happy living with her boyfriend. The video ends as she packs her suitcase and walks out of the house.

== Critical reception ==
The song has received almost universally positive reviews from British critics. In August 2007, The Guardian gave the song a mixed review, citing its strong comparisons to Lily Allen, but praised the "indelible chorus". In September 2007, Pitchfork Media gave a positive review of the song, citing Nash's "gift for communicating confusing romance with a keen eye for detail and scene-stealing turns of phrase".

The Los Angeles Times also cited Nash's lyrical gift in "Foundations" in their review. In January 2008, Rolling Stone gave the song a positive review stating, "The rushed verses of "Foundations" – in which Nash dissects a couple's argument – convey sadness and snarkiness at once, and those verses sound pretty inviting, too." That same month, The New York Times gave the song an overwhelmingly positive review, hailing the song as her best and continuing with "The song is bright, peppy and mercilessly perceptive". In February 2008, Slant Magazine hailed the track as "energetic and borderline sadistic". In December 2008, Slant ranked the song at No. 17 on their list of the top 25 US released singles of 2008.

== Chart performance ==
The song spent five weeks at No. 2 on the UK Singles Chart, being held off by Rihanna and Jay-Z's "Umbrella", and Timbaland and Keri Hilson's "The Way I Are" for three weeks and two weeks, respectively. In the week ending 4 August 2007, "The Way I Are" beat "Foundations" to the top spot by just 16 copies, with the latter selling 33,562 copies. The song has sold 435,000 copies in the UK, as stated by the Official Charts Company.

== Promotion ==
On 22 July 2007, Nash performed "Foundations" at 2007's T4 on the Beach in Weston-super-Mare. The single was a commercial success, ending 2007 as the year's 17th biggest-selling single in the UK.

== Track listings ==
All tracks are written by Kate Nash.

UK CD single
No.	Title	Length
1.	"Foundations"	4:05
2.	"Habanera"	2:24

UK limited-edition 7-inch vinyl 1
No.	Title	Length
1.	"Foundations"	4:05
2.	"Old Dances"	4:26

UK limited-edition 7-inch vinyl 2
No.	Title	Length
1.	"Foundations"	4:05
2.	"Navy Taxi"	5:30

European maxi-CD single
No.	Title	Length
1.	"Foundations"	4:05
2.	"Habanera"	2:24
3.	"Navy Taxi"	5:30
4.	"Old Dances"	4:26
5.	"Foundations" (video)

US CD and digital EP
No.	Title	Length
1.	"Foundations"	4:06
2.	"Navy Taxi"	5:35
3.	"Caroline's a Victim"	2:54
4.	"Habanera"	2:24

iTunes digital download
No.	Title	Length
1.	"Foundations" (acoustic version)	3:21

== Charts ==
=== Weekly charts ===
Chart (2007)	Peak position
Australia (ARIA)	59
Austria (Ö3 Austria Top 40)	38
Belgium (Ultratop 50 Flanders)	12
Belgium (Ultratop 50 Wallonia)	25
Denmark (Tracklisten)	28
Europe (Eurochart Hot 100)	9
Germany (GfK)	37
Ireland (IRMA)	12
Netherlands (Single Top 100)	49
Scottish Singles Sales (Official Charts)	6
Switzerland (Schweizer Hitparade)	48
UK Singles (Official Charts)	2
US Bubbling Under Hot 100 (Billboard)	16
US Hot Singles Sales (Billboard)	1

=== Year-end charts ===
Chart (2007)	Position
Belgium (Ultratop 50 Flanders)	66
Europe (Eurochart Hot 100)	66
UK Singles (OCC)	17

== Certifications ==
Region	Certification	Certified units/sales
United Kingdom (BPI)	3× Platinum	1,800,000^{‡}
^{‡} Sales+streaming figures based on certification alone.
