= Made of Bricks =

Studio album by Kate Nash
- Released: 6 August 2007
- Recorded: 2006–2007
- Studio: Eastcote, London; Miloco, London; The Pool, London
- Genre: Pop
- Length: 55:40
- Label: Fiction (UK); Cherrytree (US); Universal Music (International)
- Producer: Paul Epworth; Kate Nash

Kate Nash chronology
Made of Bricks (2007)	My Best Friend Is You (2010)

Singles from Made of Bricks
- 1. "Foundations" Released: 18 June 2007; 2. "Mouthwash" Released: 1 October 2007; 3. "Pumpkin Soup" Released: 17 December 2007; 4. "Merry Happy" Released: 24 March 2008

Made of Bricks is the debut studio album by English singer-songwriter Kate Nash, released in the United Kingdom on 6 August 2007 by Fiction Records, Cherrytree Records, and the Universal Music Group. The album was a commercial success, topping the UK Albums Chart and spawning a number-two single in the form of the lead single "Foundations". The album was later released in Europe on 10 September and in the United States on 8 January 2008.

== Writing and recording ==
Nash stated in an October 2007 interview for The Village Voice that she wrote all the songs on the album a year and a half before, except for "Skeleton Song", which she had written the same year that the album came out.

== Release ==
The album was released five weeks earlier than originally planned due to the popularity of "Foundations". The album does not contain the track "Caroline's a Victim", which was released as a limited 7" single, double A-Side with "Birds" on Moshi Moshi Records before "Foundations". "Birds" was included on the album.

A version that included a "making of" DVD was available at Best Buy on the album's release in the United States. In that country, Made of Bricks debuted at number 36 on the Billboard 200 with sales of 16,000. As of January 2010, the album has sold 544,000 copies in United Kingdom and it has sold 168,000 copies in United States according to Nielsen SoundScan.

== Reception ==
Professional ratings
Aggregate scores
Source	Rating
Metacritic	71/100
Review scores
Source	Rating
AllMusic	4/5 stars
Drowned in Sound	4/10
Entertainment Weekly	B
The Guardian	2/5 stars
MusicOMH	5/5 stars
The New York Times	3.5/5 stars
Pitchfork	5.5/10
PopMatters	7/10 stars
Robert Christgau	A−
Slant	3.5/5 stars

Initial critical response to Made of Bricks was positive. At Metacritic, which assigns a normalized rating out of 100 to reviews from mainstream critics, the album has received an average score of 71, based on 23 reviews.

== Track listing ==
All tracks are written by Kate Nash, except where stated.

No.	Title	Writer(s)	Length
1.	"Play"		1:11
2.	"Foundations"	Nash, Paul Epworth	4:05
3.	"Mouthwash"		5:01
4.	"Dickhead"		3:43
5.	"Birds"		4:25
6.	"We Get On"		4:34
7.	"Mariella"		4:15
8.	"Shit Song"		3:05
9.	"Pumpkin Soup"	Nash, Epworth	2:59
10.	"Skeleton Song"	Nash, Alejandro Tovar	5:07
11.	"Nicest Thing"	Nash, Jay Malhotra	4:05
12.	"Merry Happy" (some versions include hidden track "Little Red" from 6:08; U.S. versions do not)	Nash, Anuj Khanna	5:27/13:10
Total length:			55:40

Digital download edition
No.	Title	Length
13.	"A Is for Asthma"	2:37
Total length:		58:17

Japanese CD bonus tracks
No.	Title	Length
13.	"Little Red"	6:56
14.	"Stitching Leggings"	2:16
15.	"Navy Taxi"	5:35
16.	"Habanera"	2:24
Total length:		61:03

== Personnel ==
Musicians

- Kate Nash – vocals, piano, keyboards, acoustic guitar, bass, synthesizers, production (track 1)
- Jay Malhotra – electric guitar (tracks 3–5, 10–12), bass (tracks 3–6, 10–12), acoustic guitar (track 1), percussion (track 7)
- Elliott Andrews – drums (tracks 3–6, 8, 10–12)
- Mei-ling Wong – violin (tracks 10, 11)
- Fiona Brice – strings, brass and woodwind arrangements (tracks 4, 12)
- Leo Taylor – drums (track 9)

Production personnel

- Paul Epworth – production
- Mark Rankin – engineering
- Anna Tjan – additional engineering
- Oli Wright – additional engineering
- Steve Fitzmaurice – mixing
- Daniel Morrison – mixing assistance

Additional personnel

- Chrissie Macdonald – art direction
- Richard Robinson – graphic design
- John Short – photography
- Clare Nash – additional photography
- Laura Dockrill – illustrations

== Singles ==
- Nash's debut single, "Foundations", is her most successful single to date. It charted at number #2 in the UK Singles Chart, missing the number one spot to Rihanna's "Umbrella" by less than 200 copies. The song also charted most notably in Canada, Ireland, Germany and Austria.
- The album's second single, "Mouthwash" was performed at T4 on the Beach shortly before its release. The single entered the UK Singles Chart at #54 and two weeks later reached its peak position of #23. It received mixed reviews and did not chart elsewhere.
- The third single release, "Pumpkin Soup", released in October 2007, reached its UK peak position of #23 in January 2008. The song also charted in Austria and Germany. It managed to achieve a number #40 spot in Ireland.
- The fourth and final single released from Made of Bricks was "Merry Happy". The single was predicted to chart well after it was playlisted on BBC Radio 1, however Nash did not release a video for the song. Although it underperformed in the UK, the song did manage to chart in the Top 100 in Canada and was a minor hit in the US.

== Chart positions ==
=== Weekly charts ===
Chart (2007)	Peak position
Australian Albums (ARIA)	67
Austrian Albums (Ö3 Austria)	51
Belgian Albums (Ultratop Flanders)	20
Dutch Albums (Album Top 100)	41
French Albums (SNEP)	38
German Albums (Offizielle Top 100)	38
Irish Albums (IRMA)	8
Scottish Albums (OCC)	2
Swiss Albums (Schweizer Hitparade)	39
UK Albums (OCC)	1
US Billboard 200	36
US Top Alternative Albums (Billboard)	8
US Top Rock Albums (Billboard)	11
US Indie Store Album Sales (Billboard)	8

=== Year-end charts ===
Chart (2007)	Position
UK Albums (OCC)	38

Chart (2008)	Position
Belgian Albums (Ultratop Flanders)	97
French Albums (SNEP)	174
UK Albums (OCC)	84

== Sales and certifications ==
Region	Certification	Certified units/sales
Ireland (IRMA)	Gold	7,500^{^}
United Kingdom (BPI)	2× Platinum	600,000^{‡}
^{^} Shipments figures based on certification alone.^{‡} Sales+streaming figures based on certification alone.
