= Butts for Tour Buses =

2020s campaign by Kate Nash

Butts for Tour Buses was a campaign by the British singer Kate Nash. Mounted to fund her 9 Sad Symphonies Tour, which was costing Nash around £10,000 a day, the campaign involved Nash opening an OnlyFans account, which offered pictures of her buttocks for $9.99 a month. Her announcement of the account went viral and, within a week, all her bills had been paid. She then mounted a protest outside the London offices of Live Nation UK and Spotify. Her campaign was mostly received positively, though Thom Rylance of The Lottery Winners tweeted his objections to Nash's success before backtracking and writers for The Independent, the Evening Standard, and World Socialist Web Site wrote opinion pieces critical of OnlyFans. The success of Nash's campaign increased her platform to discuss artists' struggles.

== History ==
Kate Nash, who had previously released the albums Made of Bricks (2007), My Best Friend Is You (2010), Girl Talk (2013), and Yesterday Was Forever (2018), released her fifth album 9 Sad Symphonies in 2024. She had previously sung about people attempting to look at her buttocks on her single "Merry Happy" and had appeared on the Netflix series GLOW, which ran from 2017. When that series was cancelled due to the COVID-19 pandemic, she opened a Patreon account, having previously funded Girl Talk and Yesterday Was Forever via PledgeMusic and Kickstarter. Her early work was compared to that of Lily Allen.

By November 2024, she had mounted a three-week tour of North America promoting 9 Sad Symphonies and had scheduled a tour of Europe for the same purpose. Her tour used a crew and band of ten people and cost around £10,000 a day. Between legs, her accountant told her that her tours were hemorrhaging money, prompting Nash to set up an impromptu OnlyFans account, katenyash87. She got the idea after dancing around her tour dressing room in fishnet tights. Her account charged $9.99 a month and offered photos of her buttocks. Shooting for the account took place both at her home and against walls on tour. By March 2025, her account had diversified into pay-per-view feet content and comedic food-based erotica, and she had uploaded a video called "Cake Nash".

"I'm still doing it [in May 2025] because music is just a cycle of paying for costs and trying to catch up with yourself when you're putting on shows. It's really been a relief for me to have as a support system whilst I continue to put on shows, because it just costs so much money, and I enjoy it. I feel like it's an extension of what I do with my body artistically with photo shoots. And I've been naked on TV, I've simulated sex on TV, on Glow, and I have a lot of experience in entertainment, so for me, it's just another expression of that. And I love the control, and I love being able to see how much money I can raise with a small number of fans, versus the millions of plays that I have on my Spotify that just doesn't really play well at all."

— Nash in May 2025

Nash announced her presence on the platform on 21 November 2024, the day of a gig at Òran Mór. The post went viral, and within a week all her bills had been paid. The account increased her Instagram follower count by 10,000 and she was interviewed by every major UK media outlet. Much of the coverage invoked Lily Allen, who had previously opened an account dedicated to foot fetish content. Nash stated on a subsequent Instagram post that she had opened the account in order to maintain the standard of her live show and on an episode of BBC Radio 4's Today programme that her account had paid for her to bring a crew member from the UK to continental Europe. The reaction online was mostly positive, with praise from Self Esteem and Alison Brie, though both Nash and her manager received personal abuse over the campaign. Some of her fans described her pivot to sex work as sad, prompting Nash to post that she found posting to OnlyFans "very empowering". In December 2024, she stated that her account had made more in a week than her music made in a month.

On 27 November, just before her Koko gig, Nash put a picture of her buttocks on a fire engine, drove around London, and visited the London offices of Live Nation and Spotify and the House of Commons. For the occasion, she wore a pink thong and partnered with Save Our Scene, an organisation that aims to support the preservation of UK grassroots music venues. Her protest had been inspired by a stunt involving Gail Porter, who had appeared nude for FHM, only for them to promote their 1999 Sexiest Women listing by projecting it on to the House of Commons without her consent. Nash asserted outside her Live Nation protest that the firm "had an annual revenue of £22.749 billion", that this was "a 36.38 per cent increase from last year", and that they were "the main hold-up in the government's recommendation to give £1 per arena and stadium ticket to the grassroots". Outside Spotify, she stated that they "paid 0.003 of a penny per stream", had "demonetised 80 per cent of music on the platform", and had given its shareholders "over 419 million between them".

Critics of the campaign included Thom Rylance of The Lottery Winners, who tweeted his objections to Nash becoming "the spokesperson for the 'working class musician'" due to her education at BRIT School, a performing arts college that he falsely alleged counted among its alumni "8/10 best artist nominees at the Brit Awards last year" (it was actually two, Olivia Dean and Raye). Rylance later stated that he had meant that "more than half" of its nominees had attended fee-paying schools, compared with 5.9% of the population that went there, and Nash responded with a series of Instagram Stories using images from Buffy the Vampire Slayer as a background.

The success of the campaign increased Nash's platform to discuss artists's struggles, especially theirs of the live music industry; by May 2025, she had spoken on several programmes including Huw Stephens's BBC Radio 6 show and on ITV's Lorraine and BBC Radio 4's Woman's Hour. On the last of these, Spotify blamed Nash's deal with Universal Music Group for her lack of royalties. Claudia Cockerell of The Standard wrote that Allen and Nash's presence on OnlyFans should be a wake-up call for the state of the industry, while The Independent ran an article on 30 November asking whether OnlyFans was feminism or exploitation and David Walsh of World Socialist Web Site wrote "that performers have to resort to semi-pornography to earn a living brings to mind the general identification in the 18th century of actresses with prostitutes". Jenessa Williams of The Forty-Five wrote that "fussing over Nash's bum or Allen's feet only serves to distract us from the bigger issues" and that "refusing to understand why it's becoming such a viable option for many artists is simply akin to being a little bit prudish". In May 2025, Beth Ashley of Mashable attributed negative reactions to Nash's account to a wider stigma surrounding sex work that had seen both Lily Phillips and Bonnie Blue condemned for doing their jobs.
