= Secret Lives of Gypsy Wives =

British reality television series

- Genre: Reality; Documentary
- Developed by: Ruby Rookes; Jack Foster; Ally Farrell
- Directed by: Jess Kennedy Buckley
- Creative directors: Nick Hornby; Tina Flintoff
- Starring: Trewley Precious; Tina Bowina Temple; Ruby-Anne Temple; Honey Peaches Temple; Pearlygirl Temple; Jamie John Temple
- Composer: Tommy Evans
- Country of origin: United Kingdom
- Original language: English
- No. of series: 1
- No. of episodes: 6

Production
- Production locations: Clacton-on-Sea, Essex
- Editors: Joel Legate; Andrew Gaston
- Running time: 60 minutes incl.
- Production company: Optomen

Original release
- Network: Channel 4
- Release: 20 July 2026 – present

Secret Lives of Gypsy Wives is a reality television series that premiered on Channel 4 on 20 July 2026. It follows social media influencer Trewley Precious and documents the events of her life, as well as the lives of her family, friends and neighbours. The main cast of the series, Trewley Precious and her family, grew up immersed in a combination of a Traveller and council estate household.

A large part of Secret Lives of Gypsy Wives sees Trewley decline to take to a traditional patriarchal Traveller lifestyle, instead wanting to focus on her career instead of marriage and children. She has revealed since its premiere that she pitched the series herself, wanting to represent her communities in a non-stereotypical way. Secret Lives of Gypsy Wives was praised by critics, who praised the subject matter shown throughout, as well as complimenting the cast for how they came across.

== Premise ==
Secret Lives of Gypsy Wives focuses on social media influencer Trewley Precious Temple, as well as the lives of her family, friends and neighbouring community. The Temple family grew up on a council estate in Clacton-on-Sea, Essex, while Sidney, the deceased patriarch of the family, was a Traveller and therefore instilled his lifestyle into the family. The series primarily focuses on Trewley Precious and her defiance to follow the traditional Traveller lifestyle of getting married and beginning a family young. In her mid-20s, she instead focuses on her influencer career, to the disagreement of her community. As well as this, her family is heavily featured in the series and she compares themselves to the Kardashian family if they were "fat and broke and on benefits".

== Cast ==
- Trewley Precious Temple
- Tina Bowina Temple
- Ruby-Anne Temple
- Honey Peaches Temple
- Pearlygirl Temple
- Jamie John Temple

== Episodes ==
No.	Title	Original release date
1	"Episode 1"	20 July 2026
Trewley Precious and her family are introduced; her siblings: Ruby-Anne, Honey Peaches, Pearlygirl and Jamie John, as well as mother Tina. Trewley explains that as part of traditional Traveller values, she is expected to have children and a husband as she is now in her mid-20s. However, she declares that she wants a successful career first. She also explains that the family patriarch, Sidney, died over two years ago and the struggles the family have faced. Trewley gets a belly button piercing, to her family's disgust, which Tina makes her remove.
2	"Episode 2"	27 July 2026
After acquiring a brand deal with false lash company Meggi Lashes, Trewley releases a collection with sets named after the women in her family. She surprises them by getting them involved with a photoshoot for the company. She later raises money doing a car boot sale for a Halloween party for the children on her estate.
3	"Episode 3"	3 August 2026
Trewley acquires another brand deal, this time with Give Me Cosmetics. She meets with them to discuss the different products that will be included within her collection. Trewley buys fireworks for a display for the local estate to celebrate Guy Fawkes Night; Ruby-Anne handles the display and sends fireworks shooting all around the area. The Temple family commemorate the third anniversary of Sidney's death. Trewley attends a photoshoot for her Give Me collection, despite not feeling mentally stable due to her grief.
4	"Episode 4"	10 August 2026
The Temples celebrate Pearlygirl's son's first birthday, which she is emotional about due to her partner having been in prison since prior to the birth. To celebrate her friend James' birthday, Trewley goes on a rare night out, to her sisters' dismay. Ruby-Anne enforces a curfew for her to be back in the hotel by, which she rebels against and lies. Using money from her brand deals, she books a holiday for the family to Morocco.
5	"Episode 5"	17 August 2026
Trewley buys an old car for Tina for Christmas, to her shock. She later talks with James about pursuing dating, to which he suggests using dating apps. Tina disagrees and urges Trewley to date in real life instead, after which she goes speed dating. Trewley features on GK Barry's Saving Grace podcast, where she reveals that she wants to release a song with rapper Benny Banks. She records a demo, but he declines to feature on the song, to her disappointment.
6	"Episode 6"	24 August 2026
The women of the Temple family go dress shopping for Pearlygirl's upcoming wedding. There, Trewley reveals she is going on a date with a man she met in Wales, to which they disagree. She goes on a pottery class and for drinks with him, where they agree to a third date. Pearlygirl later prepares for her partner to be released from prison. Trewley is offered a six-figure deal with a weight loss injection company, to which she realises she could fund for her mother, but she disagrees with the morals of advertising it to her audience and declines. She later celebrates her 26th birthday with her family.

== Production ==
Secret Lives of Gypsy Wives was mainly filmed in Clacton-on-Sea, Essex, on the council estate that the Temple family live in. It was filmed throughout 2025 to early 2026. Trewley Precious pitched the idea for it to her manager Andrea, who features in the series, who then got into contact with Optomen, the production company, and Channel 4. She has clarified that she had no input on the naming of the show. She explained: "It was about me being from a poor council estate. My dad is a gypsy. My mum is a gorja. I live life on social media. My family have different mixtures of traditions from both cultures and it's a clash. I didn't name the title that, Channel 4 changed the name, and I don't know why I have to state it, because EastEnders people like who work on there, don't have to say they didn't name EastEnders so I don't know why I have to state I didn't do that, but I didn't. I pitched it myself. [...] I just want everyone to know that this show isn't about all gypsies. I don't know why people are so confused by that. It's about my life. My upbringing."

Trewley Precious has stated that whilst making the series, she did not want it to contain stereotypes about the communities it was representing. She named Big Fat Gypsy Weddings as an example for a series that harmed the reputation of the Traveller community and did not want for her series to follow suit. She did not want the series to televise various things, such as her sister cleaning her trailer, since she did not want stereotypes and wanted to show she had "come from more ways of life than that". As well as representing the Traveller community, she also did not want anything harmful to air about her council estate or for it to seem like she was mocking it, expressing her love for her area.

== Reception ==
Polly Vernon, writing for Grazia, dubbed Secret Lives of Gypsy Wives the "best thing on TV" in her review of the series. She assumed from the title of the series that it would be a "guilty grubby snobby reality TV freak show" and, although a fan of that genre, was pleasantly surprised to be instead moved and emotionally impacted by it. Vernon complimented the series for its subject matter and appreciated that it broached "family, womanhood, literal sisterhood", as well as the Temple family grieving for their patriarch and representing people on the breadline that were not typically televised. The Guardian's Lucy Mangan praised the series and its cast, describing them as a "gift to reality TV". She appreciated what the series depicted and felt the family were an "articulate, charismatic gift to the camera".

The series and its cast faced criticism from the Traveller community, who felt that the series should have focused on people who were "full bred gypsies". Trewley Precious responded to the criticism by sharing numerous photos on Instagram of the generations of Travellers within her ancestry, as well as appearing on a podcast with Paul C Brunson. She declared that another cast were not chosen because it was her idea and she had pitched it. She added: "there's a lot of girls doing videos that are like, 'I got picked for the show, I turned it down'. Well, you didn't get picked for the show, darling, because I pitched it and I picked me and my sisters".
