= Annie Knight =

Australian sex worker and content creator (born 1996/1997)

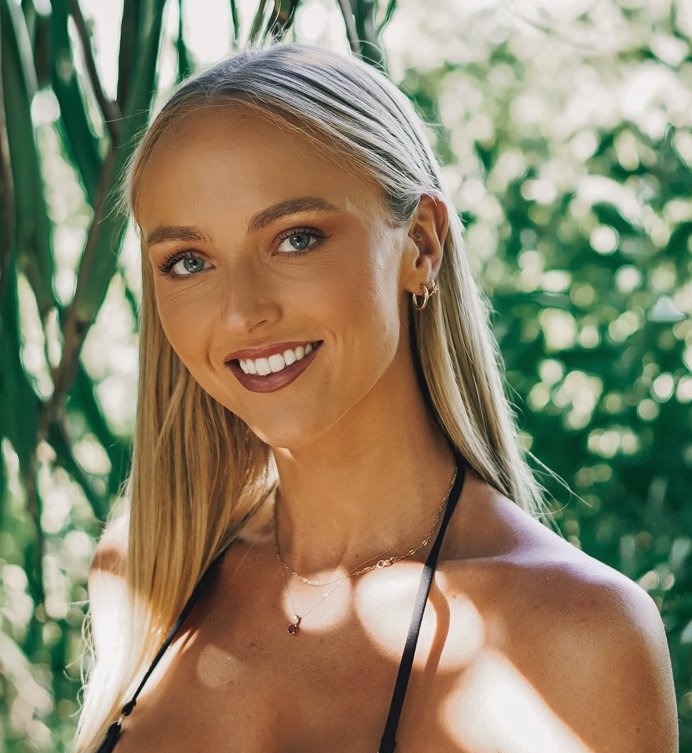
- Knight in 2024
- Born: 1996 or 1997 (age 28–29)
- Education: University of Melbourne
- Occupation: Sex worker
- Years active: 2020–present

Annie Knight (born 1996 or 1997) is an Australian sex worker and pornographic content creator. After a local radio station described her as "Australia's most sexually active woman", she announced plans to film with Bonnie Blue and "barely legal 18-year-olds" at 2024's schoolies week and then had sex with 583 men on 18 May 2025. She subsequently began teaching sex education with Lily Phillips.

== Life and career ==
Knight was born in 1996 or 1997 and grew up in Gold Coast, Queensland. She studied science at the University of Melbourne. She met her partner, the son of James Brayshaw, while working in a Melbourne pub in 2016; they began dating in November 2024 and got engaged in March 2025. Knight began working as a shopping centre's marketing manager in Brisbane but felt unsatisfied by its $60,000 salary, so opened an OnlyFans account in September 2020 to top up her income, for which she was eventually fired.

In 2023, after deciding that $30,000 per month was not enough to retire young or buy enough properties for a satisfactory passive income, she began telling her TikTok followers about her sex life including pegging, gang bangs, and having sex with 300 people in a year. She then appeared on a local radio station, who branded her "Australia's most sexually active woman". This increased her income to $100,000 per month. In 2024, Knight and Bonnie Blue announced that they would attend that year's schoolies week and were looking for "barely legal 18-year-olds" to film porn with. Their plans sparked outrage and a Change.org petition to cancel their visas. Blue's visa was then cancelled, after which the pair attempted to film in Fiji, which led to the pair being deported. Knight defended her actions in a TikTok video.

Inspired by both Blue's 1,000-man challenge and Phillips's 101-man challenge, Knight had sex with 583 men in six hours on 18 May 2025 and subsequently uploaded it to Fansly and a vlog of the experience to Instagram. Filmed at a sex club in the Gold Coast, the shoot took about six weeks to plan and involved five personal assistants, a videographer, a photographer, and three security guards; a hired fluffer failed to show. A flare-up of her endometriosis caused her to be hospitalised two days later. The event gained negative reception, prompting Knight to defend herself in an interview with Vulture. She subsequently said that the stunt had tripled her income. In November 2025, she and Lily Phillips appeared on The Kyle and Jackie O Show and began teaching sex education at that year's schoolies.
