= Josie Cunningham =

British media personality and model

- Born: Leeds, England, U.K
- Years active: 2013-present
- Television: Josie: The Most Hated Woman in Britain?
- Children: 6

Josie Cunningham is a British born media personality and glamour model. She is best known for publicly bragging about receiving free breast implant surgery on the NHS to tabloids, causing her to be given the title of "most hated woman in Britain" by the press.

== Career ==
In 2013, Cunningham first appeared in the media after an interview with the controversial British tabloid The Sun thanking the British taxpayers for funding her £4,800 breast implant surgery. The story began being picked up by many other British media outlets and eventually hit American media outlets. She also continued to smoke and drink alcohol while pregnant, claiming she was doing it as she was disappointed of the gender of her baby being a boy, stating had she known the gender earlier she would have had an abortion.

In 2014, she launched a dating website to encourage women to get pregnant and claim benefits. She launched a second dating website titled Pull-The-Pig for what she claimed to be "achievable" looking women to find a partner.

In 2015, Channel 4 released a documentary titled Josie: The Most Hated Woman in Britain?. She continued to be in tabloid and news headlines throughout 2015, after having an abortion to get rhinoplasty surgery.

In 2016, after deleting her social media for 5 months, she made an appearance on Loose Women, thanking panelist Jane Moore for helping change her life around.

== Personal life ==
Cunningham has six children.

== Filmography ==
Television
Year	Title	Role	Notes
2013	Lorraine	Self; guest	1 episode
2013-2017	This Morning	Self; guest	4 episodes
2014-2016	Loose Women	Self; guest	4 episodes
2015	Josie: The Most Hated Woman in Britain?	Self; feature	Documentary
2021	Tonight with Dan Wootton	Self; guest	1 episode
