= Saving Grace (podcast) =

British podcast, launched 2022

- Format: Streaming
- Language: English

Cast and voices
- Hosted by: GK Barry

Publication
- No. of episodes: 201
- Original release: 20 April 2022
- Provider: The Fellas Studios

Saving Grace is a podcast presented by English personality GK Barry. Launched in April 2022, it had the fifth largest weekly audience of any podcast in Britain in the first quarter of 2024, and contains frequent discussion of sex lives. An October 2024 episode featuring pornographic actress Bonnie Blue went viral after she discussed who she had sex with. In addition, Barry has mounted three tours of the podcast since 2023.

== History ==
Launched in April 2022, Barry launched the podcast at the suggestion of The Fellas Studios, who were looking to diversify into video podcasts; her first guest was TikToker Max Balegde. Most episodes were recorded inside a studio in Hackney, London, though she started touring the podcast in early 2023; this sold out in two minutes. A June episode featured her then-boyfriend.

By October 2023, she had interviewed Jamie Laing, Mark Wright, Katie Price, Georgia Harrison, Rob Beckett, and Mae Muller; by January, the podcast had 740,000 monthly listeners, having by then featured Madison Beer and Alison Hammond. Barry mounted a subsequent tour, The Size Matters Tour, in February 2024; its guests included Gemma Collins, Price, and Hannah Elizabeth, and its venues included the London Palladium. She also released an episode featuring Chunkz and Yung Filly that month, but later pulled it following multiple allegations of rape against the latter. In June 2024, Edison Research found that the podcast had the fifth largest weekly audience of any podcast in the UK during the first quarter of that year.

On 23 October 2024, the pornographic actress Bonnie Blue appeared on the podcast. During her episode, she discussed her niche of having sex with university students and recounted an occasion in which she had sex with a student and then his father. A clip of the latter went viral and was subsequently deleted. Blue attributed the criticism to the podcast's female audience and stated that the backlash Barry received should have been directed at her. The episode also went viral shortly before Barry was announced for the twenty-fourth series of I'm a Celebrity...Get Me Out of Here!. By the time her participation was announced, she had recorded over 100 episodes and her guests had included Alan Carr, Louise Pentland, and Ella Rutherford, Barry's girlfriend. Among her campmates on I'm a Celebrity was future interviewee Richard Coles. She then mounted a September 2025 tour, The Jungle Fever Tour, which took its name from that series's filming location.

Barry ends episodes by asking her guests what they would do to "save Grace", Barry's real name. In January 2024, Dusty Baxter-Wright of Cosmopolitan attributed Barry's ability to do this to her openness with her own private life. Barry stated in July 2025 that Rutherford was used to her discussing their sex life on the podcast.
