= GK Barry =

English social media comedian, influencer and presenter (born 1999)

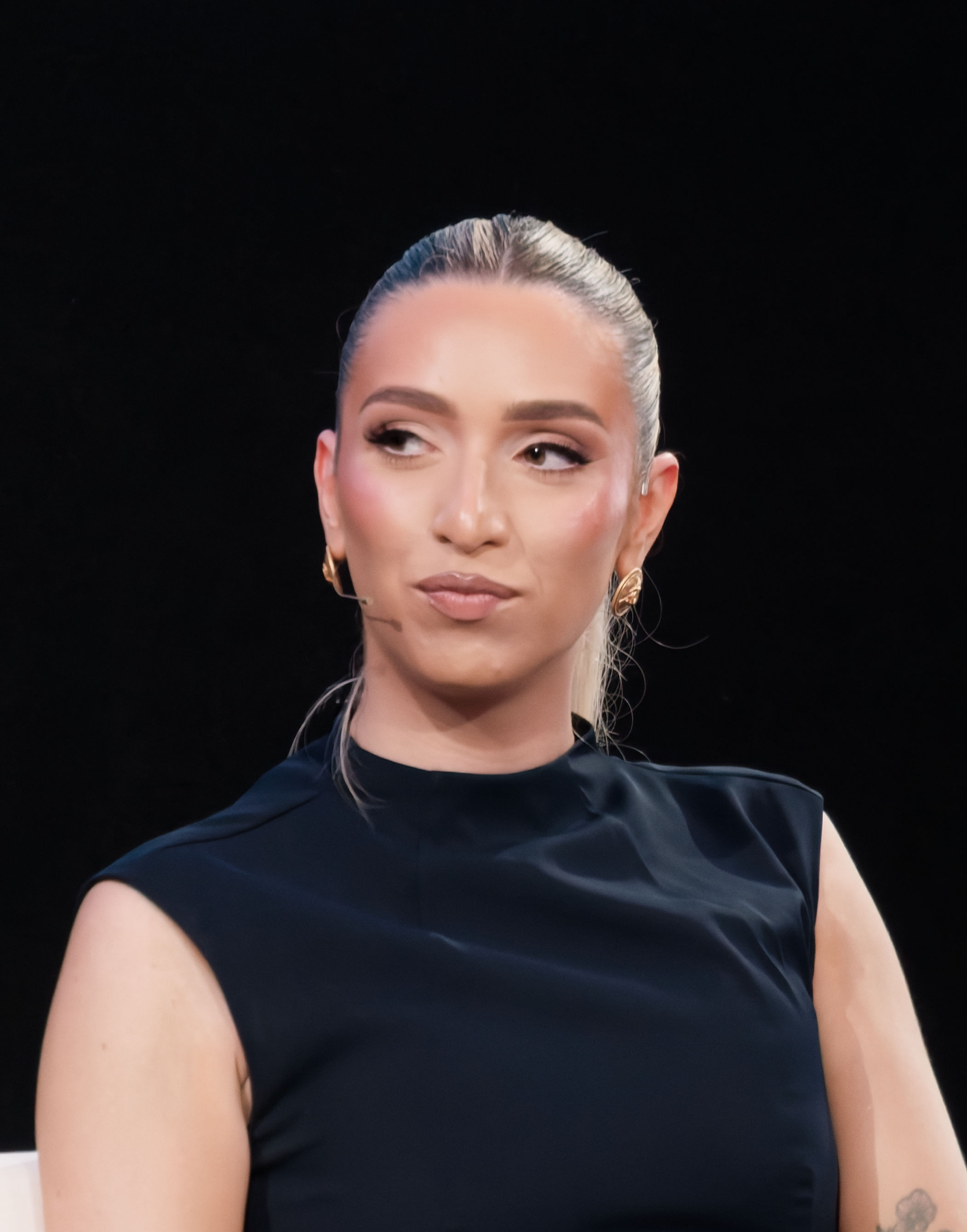
- Keeling in 2026
- Born: Grace Eleanor Keeling; 12 August 1999 (age 27); Cambridge, England
- Education: Nottingham Trent University
- Occupations: Media personality; social media influencer; presenter; podcaster
- Years active: 2020–present
- Partner: Ella Rutherford (2024–present)

Instagram information
- Page: gkbarry_

TikTok information
- Page: gkbarry
- Followers: 4.2 million

YouTube information
- Channel: Saving Grace
- Genre: Podcast
- Subscribers: 541,000
- Views: 96 million
- Last updated: 30 June 2026

Grace Eleanor Keeling (born 12 August 1999), known professionally as GK Barry, is an English media personality, social media influencer and presenter. She began posting on video-sharing platform TikTok in 2020 whilst completing a film studies degree at Nottingham Trent University. After one year of posting lifestyle videos on the app, Keeling surpassed 1 million followers and later began presenting a podcast, Saving Grace, in which she interviews celebrities.

In 2024, Keeling began appearing as a panellist on the ITV talk show Loose Women, making her the youngest regular panellist in the show's 25-year history. Later that same year, she appeared as a contestant on the twenty-fourth series of the ITV reality show I'm a Celebrity...Get Me Out of Here!. In 2025, she made her acting debut with a cameo in the Netflix original series Missing You. In 2026, she began hosting Big Brother: The Group Chat and released her debut book It's Giving Life.

== Early life and education ==
Grace Eleanor Keeling was born on 12 August 1999 in Cambridge, England. When she was two her family moved to the British Virgin Islands, returning to the United Kingdom six years later.

Keeling studied film at Nottingham Trent University (NTU), obtaining a master's in digital marketing. Whilst at NTU, she worked with the BBC soap opera Doctors, created videos for ShawMind and Nottinghamshire Police, helped the Nottingham Women's Centre rebrand their business and assisted on the set of the Netflix film Hood.

== Career ==
Keeling came to attention on TikTok in 2020, during the COVID-19 pandemic. She chose the username @gkbarry due to initially not wanting her real name to become public and has explained that the username comes from her initials, GK, and the surname of her friend, Tatiana Barry.

In late 2021, she appeared on the Fellas podcast, which led to Keeling starting her own podcast under The Fellas Studios, Saving Grace, in April 2022, which is also uploaded as a vodcast to YouTube. In November 2022, Keeling participated in Footasylum's "Locked In" online reality series in which she finished as the second runner-up. In February 2023, Keeling toured the UK as part of her Saving Grace podcast. Later that month, she also appeared in an episode of Love Island: Aftersun to discuss the ninth series with presenter Maya Jama. She also fronted an advertisement campaign for KFC in July 2023. Keeling has also appeared on the ITV2 game show CelebAbility in July 2023, as well as appearing as a contestant in episodes of The Wheel and The Weakest Link on BBC One. In September 2023, Keeling was announced as one of the celebrities participating in Don't Look Down for Stand Up to Cancer, which aired on Channel 4 in October 2023. In October 2023, Keeling appeared as a guest panellist on the Big Brother companion show, Big Brother: Late & Live, to discuss the twentieth series with presenters Will Best and AJ Odudu.

From February to March 2024, Keeling completed a sold-out UK tour for a second time as part of the Saving Grace podcast. Guests for the second tour included Charity Shop Sue, Gemma Collins, Hannah Elizabeth, Chloe Ferry, Chris Hughes, Katie Price, Louie Spence, and Scott van-der-Sluis. The same year, she confirmed she was in a relationship with Portsmouth footballer Ella Rutherford. Since August 2024, Keeling has appeared as a regular panellist on the ITV daytime talk show Loose Women, making her the youngest panellist ever on the show at the age of 25. In October 2024, she received backlash for interviewing prolific and controversial pornographic actress Bonnie Blue on the Saving Grace podcast. In November 2024, Keeling was a contestant in the twenty-fourth series of the survival reality television show I'm a Celebrity...Get Me Out of Here! and was the eighth contestant to be eliminated, finishing in fifth place. Keeling grew close to Rev. Richard Coles during the show, a relationship that fans referred to as a "bromance", and he later appeared as a guest in an episode of Saving Grace. Over a week after leaving I'm a Celebrity...Get Me Out of Here!, Keeling took over Wembley Arena for her Saving Grace: XXX-Mas Special on 15 December 2024, which saw Maura Higgins and Dean McCullough appear as guests.

In January 2025, Keeling appeared as a guest panellist on the Channel 4 comedy talk show, The Last Leg. In May, she was revealed to be a judge on Jimmy Carr's new comedy show Am I The A**hole?, airing on Comedy Central later that year, as well as being a host on BBC Radio 1 on the weekend afternoon show in July of the same year. She also made her acting debut, with a cameo as Vanessa in the Netflix original series Missing You. In September 2025, Keeling toured the UK for a third time, as part of the Saving Grace: Jungle Fever Tour. Guests for the third tour included Elektra Fence, Tulisa, Denise Welch, and Louise Pentland. Keeling returned to The Last Leg for another episode in November 2025. Later that month, Keeling received backlash when presenting the Women's League Cup quarter-final and semi-final draw with her girlfriend Ella Rutherford, primarily for making "crude comments" and for not taking the event seriously. She also reportedly dropped one of the balls, picked it back up and reintroduced it as part of the draw. She later made a cameo appearance in Olivia and Alex: Parenthood, following the lives of former Love Island series 2 stars, Alex and Olivia Bowen, and their transition into parenthood. In March 2026, it was announced that Keeling would be taking place in Soccer Aid 2026. In July, Keeling made a documentary with the BBC about the online forum site Tattle Life, titled GK Barry: Toxic Gossip. Later that year, Keeling and Kate Lawler were announced as the co-hosts of ITV2's Big Brother: The Group Chat, a vodcast spin-off series for Big Brother. In September 2026, she released her debut book, It's Giving Life.

== Personal life ==
Keeling is bisexual. She has been in a relationship with footballer Ella Rutherford since 2024. In August 2026, ahead of the release of her book, It's Giving Life, Keeling spoke publicly for the first time about being raped and sexually assaulted by her boss while on a work experience placement when she was 17.

== Filmography ==
=== Television ===
Year	Title	Role	Production	Notes	Ref.
2022	Locked In	Contestant	Footasylum	Series 3; 3rd place	
2023	Love Island: Aftersun	Guest panellist	ITV2	Series 9, Episode 6	
2023	The Weakest Link	Contestant	BBC One	Series 3, Episode 15	
2023	"Don't Look Down" for Stand Up to Cancer	Contestant	Channel 4		
2023	Big Brother: Late & Live	Guest panellist	ITV2	Series 1, Episode 28	
2024	Boss Pitches	Host	Channel 4		
2024	The Wheel	Contestant	BBC One	Series 4, Episode 7	
2024	CelebAbility	Contestant	ITV2	Series 7, Episode 5	
2024	I'm a Celebrity...Get Me Out of Here!	Contestant	ITV1	Series 24 (5th place)	
2024–present	Loose Women	Panellist	ITV1		
2025	Missing You	Vanessa (Katalina)	Netflix	Cameo	
2025	The Last Leg	Guest panellist	Channel 4	Series 32, Episode 1 Series 33, Episode 4	
2025	This Morning	Guest	ITV1	Series 37, Episode 125	
2025	Olivia and Alex: Parenthood	Herself	ITV2	Cameo	
2025	Celebrity MasterChef: Christmas Cook-Off	Contestant	BBC One		
2025–present	Jimmy Carr's Am I The A**hole?	Judge	Comedy Central		
2026	Celebrity Sabotage	Celebrity Saboteur	ITV1		
2026	I'm a Celebrity: Unpacked	Guest	ITV2		
2026	GK Barry: Toxic Gossip	Herself	BBC iPlayer		
2026	Secret Lives of Gypsy Wives	Herself	Channel 4	Cameo	
2026	Big Brother: The Group Chat	Co-host	ITV2	Alongside Kate Lawler	

=== Podcast ===
Year	Title	Role	Production	Ref.
2022–present	Saving Grace	Presenter	The Fellas Studios	
2024	The Turnout with GK Barry	Presenter	Bauer	
2025	Loose Women: The Podcast	Presenter	ITV Studios	

== Bibliography ==
- It's Giving Life (2026)
