= Solihull Times =

The Solihull News and the Solihull Times used to be free newspapers distributed in Solihull, England.

== History ==
The Solihull News was founded in 1930 as the Warwickshire News and delivered news and sport from the borough of Solihull and south Birmingham; it ceased publication on 21 December 2018 In the 1980s, the newsroom team included Nigel Hastilow, Steve Green and Jane Moore.

The Solihull Times was founded as a rival newspaper in the early 1980s by Bullman Newspapers and was a free title, although both were eventually owned by Trinity Mirror. The launch editor of the Solihull Times was Alison Parkinson. The first reporters were Robbie Burns (who went on to become The Naked Trader) and Anne Adams. The first photographer was Mike Fenwick.
