= Friesland School =

Location
- Nursery Avenue; Sandiacre, Derbyshire, NG10 5AF; England; 52.9223°N 1.3049°W

Information
- Type: Academy
- Local authority: Derbyshire
- Trust: The Two Counties Trust
- Department for Education URN: 145966 Tables
- Ofsted: Reports
- Headteacher: Craig Patterson
- Gender: Co-educational
- Age: 11 to 18
- Website: friesland.ttct.co.uk

Friesland School is a co-educational secondary school and sixth form located in Sandiacre in the English county of Derbyshire.

Previously a foundation school administered by Derbyshire County Council, Friesland School converted to academy status in June 2018 . The school is now sponsored by The Two Counties Trust.

Friesland School offers GCSEs and BTECs as programmes of study for pupils, while students in the sixth form have the option to study from a range of A Levels and further BTECs.

Friesland School also specialises in performing arts, and operates Performing Arts Centre which hosts professional touring companies and local amateur dramatic groups as well as school productions, performances and recitals.

== Ofsted ==
Friesland School was rated 'Good' in their most recent Ofsted inspection in May 2015.

== Notable former students ==
- Bonnie Blue
