= Bonnie Blue =

English pornographic film actress (born 1999)

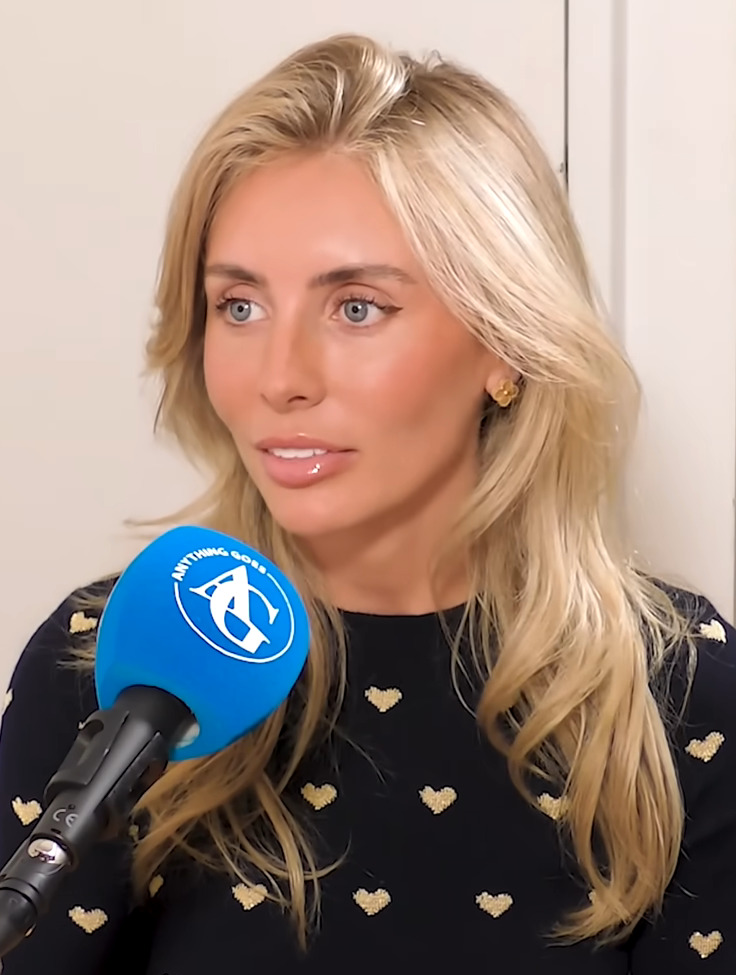
- Blue in 2025
- Born: Tia Billinger; 1999 (age 26–27); Stapleford, Nottinghamshire, England
- Occupation: Pornographic film actress
- Years active: 2023–present
- Children: 1

Tia Billinger (born 1999), known professionally as Bonnie Blue, is an English pornographic film actress. After attending 2023's schoolies week, she had sex with large numbers of students at both spring break in Cancún, Mexico, and freshers' week in Derby and Nottingham, England, and went viral for discussing her sex life on GK Barry's podcast Saving Grace. She was criticised during this period for the age of her co-stars (as young as 18) and for comments that critics have described as promoting misogyny and the sexual objectification of women.

Blue claimed to have had sex with 1,057 men in 12 hours on 11 January 2025, making her the subject of months of media attention and inspiring similar events by Lily Phillips, Annie Knight, and Drake Von. She was banned from OnlyFans in June after announcing and later cancelling an event in which she would be tied up naked inside a glass box with the goal of having sex with 2,000 men, following which she moved her content to Fansly. She then organised a freshers' week tour and claimed to have had unprotected sex with about 400 men in one day. In 2025, she was the fourth-most searched-for porn star on Pornhub and the fifth-most searched-for topic by UK users of Google Search.

== Life and career ==
=== 1999–2025: Early life and career beginnings ===
Blue was born Tia Billinger in 1999 in Stapleford, Nottinghamshire, and grew up in nearby Draycott. She attended Friesland School, and took part in the British street dance championships with her sister in 2015. Blue originally wanted to be a midwife but changed her plan during her A-levels after discovering that she was already earning the post's starting salary by working in a Poundstretcher store and as a dance teacher. She then moved to outside Nottingham with a man she had met at a New Year's Eve in 2013 before spending five years recruiting staff for finance roles in the National Health Service in England and 18 months trying to conceive with him. The pair then married in February 2022 and moved to Australia's Gold Coast. She has stated that she lost confidence and gained weight while resident in Australia due to living among large numbers of influencers. Towards the end of her two years there, she saw women on TikTok advertising camming services; inspired by their wide range of shapes, sizes and backgrounds, she followed suit using the name Bonnie Blue, making $5,000 in her first week. She then became an escort.

Blue joined OnlyFans in May 2023, and she made £8,000 (equivalent to £8,359 in 2025) from her subscriptions within a month. She drifted apart from her husband around this time, and separated from him in November, although she continued to hire him for some time after. She has repeatedly stated that their split was unrelated to her occupation. That month, she went to schoolies week with OnlyFans creators Leilani May and Kay Manuel with the intention of handing out business cards with QR codes to her OnlyFans account, following which the Daily Mail ran a story calling her a sexual predator. She then began recruiting men over the age of 18 to have sex with, including 122 students at spring break in Cancún in March 2024 and 150 students at freshers' week in Derby and Nottingham in September 2024. She was joined in Cancún and England by May and Lily Phillips, and promoted the events with a sign her mother had made saying "Bonk me and let me film it". Following the former, she appeared on The Kyle and Jackie O Show, where she attracted backlash after claiming that unsatisfied men had the right to cheat on their partners and that doing so made them better husbands.

On 23 October 2024, Blue appeared on GK Barry's Saving Grace podcast. During her episode, she discussed her niche of having sex with university students, claimed to have had sex with their lecturers and married men, blamed women neglecting their sex lives for men's demand for her, and recounted an occasion in which she had sex with a student and then his father. A clip of the last of these went viral and was later deleted. Viewers accused Blue of misogyny, contributing towards the sexual objectification of women, manipulating young men into performing sex on camera, and ignoring the long-term impacts on such men. In interviews with The Tab and Cosmopolitan later that month, she stated that the criticism could be attributed to the podcast's female audience, that the backlash Barry received should have been directed at herself, and that she produced content with 18-year-old men out of a desire to educate them. The episode also went viral shortly before Barry was announced for the twenty-fourth series of I'm a Celebrity...Get Me Out of Here!. Blue also discussed her sex life on Lottie Moss's Dream On podcast around this time.

By early November, Blue had been the subject of sympathy from journalist Sophie Wilkinson and had told the Daily Star that men came to her because they were unsatisfied by their spouses. Around this time, she and Annie Knight announced that they would attend that year's schoolies week and were looking for "barely legal 18-year-olds" to film porn with, sparking outrage and a successful Change.org petition to cancel Blue's travel visa. The pair attempted then to film in Fiji, which led to them being deported. Blue then debated with reality television personality Ashley James on the ITV daytime show This Morning over the promotion of her content. The following month, after being edited to feature the logo of online casino Stake, a September 2024 clip of Blue outside Nottingham Trent University talking about having sex with lots of "barely legal 18-year-olds" went viral on Twitter, prompting anti-gambling campaigners to write to the UK's culture secretary to request censorship of the advert for using sex to promote gambling to young people. The post, which had not been uploaded by an official Stake account but by an account claiming to be affiliated with the firm, was later deleted. Blue then went viral in early January after harassing a Five Guys employee at work.

=== 2025: World record attempt and 1,000 and Me ===
Blue attempted to break the world record for the most sex in one day on 11 January 2025, when she had sex with 1,057 men in a 12-hour period at 32 Portland Place in London. The event followed pornographic film actress Lisa Sparxxx claiming to set a one-day record of 919 men in 2004 and Phillips going viral for the documentary I Slept with 100 Men in One Day. (Note: According to Cosmopolitan, previous world record figures were likely inflated, and Sparxxx's event only hosted 150 men.) Blue had previously claimed the latter was her idea. Her co-stars were filmed in groups, and mostly wore balaclavas, with footage of men queueing and one man being forcibly removed from the event by his mother going viral. Following the event, widespread criticism was directed at Blue and then at the men, with Victoria Smith of UnHerd accusing Blue of selling "misogyny" and "dehumanisation", Elle describing both Blue and Phillips' "hypersexualisation" and the abstinence of the 4B movement as "extreme responses" to the period's sexual culture, and Gareth Roberts of The Spectator writing that both Blue and manosphere influencer Andrew Tate were "encouraging, and revelling in, very bad male behaviours". Critics of the men included Olivia Attwood, Katherine Ryan, and several columnists, many of whom compared them to the perpetrators in the Pelicot rape case.

Blue's record attempt made her the subject of months of media attention, including an article in The Economist titled "Welcome to Bonnie Blue's Britain", and an article in The Times. She stated repeatedly during this period that she did her job because she enjoyed it and once described her co-stars as "a thousand reasons" to do so. Her record attempt inspired Phillips to have sex with 1,113 men on 29 June 2025, Knight to have sex with 583 men in a six-hour period on 18 May 2025, Drake Von to announce a "1,000 bottoms versus one top" challenge, and an Edinburgh Festival Fringe show by Issy Knowles. Additionally, Jack Whitehall produced a trailer for his tour parodying the event. Following production, OnlyFans announced that it would no longer host content filmed with amateurs at the behest of its payment processor Visa and Blue filmed a challenge with 100 professionals. Both Blue and Phillips implied that they were pregnant in February 2025, following which Blue stated she would use the income from the resulting media attention to pay for someone else's IVF. She briefly sponsored Cornwall amateur football club Calstock F.C. and appeared on the Stiff Socks podcast in April 2025, and claimed to have been banned from Nottingham Forest F.C. in May for being a sex worker. She and Phillips then staged their arrests.

By June, trans sex worker Kay Manuel had been dubbed the "Australian Bonnie Blue" by the Daily Mail after having sex with 75 students in 48 hours, and Blue was making $2.1 million per month on OnlyFans, and had appeared on The Isiah Factor Uncensored. That month, she announced and later cancelled an event in which she would be naked and tied up inside a glass box with the intention of having sex with 2,000 men, drawing criticism from fellow OnlyFans creators including Sophie Rain and Camilla Araújo, and comparisons with Marina Abramović's Rhythm 0. Around this time, a false rumour that she was trans went viral, and her Wikipedia page was getting more views than Beyoncé's and almost as many as Taylor Swift's. After moving to Fansly after being banned from OnlyFans, she appeared as a guest on Tate's Disruptors podcast, and attracted backlash for using her appearance to query why she should take criticism from stay-at-home mothers or from people who paid less tax than her.

Channel 4 broadcast the documentary 1,000 Men and Me: The Bonnie Blue Story in late July, which featured Victoria Silver following Blue around for six months, and chronicling her world record attempt, move from OnlyFans, recruitment of multiple young-looking female content creators in school uniforms for an orgy, and preparation to fly to Romania to film Disruptors. The film also sampled several of Blue's Instagram and TikTok videos, and depicted her inviting her record attempt co-stars to "treat me like your slut" and "rearrange my insides". Criticism was directed at the show for featuring footage of Blue having sex and at Silver for not adequately challenging Blue, with Lucy Mangan of The Guardian writing that 1,000 Men and Me showed Blue "to be as steely in her approach to her career as she is Stakhanovite in her labours", Olivia Petter of The Independent writing that the documentary felt "like little more than a prurient exercise to capitalise on one woman’s infamy", Carol Midgley of The Times describing what she saw as "squalid ... end-of-days stuff", and broadcast and children's commissioner Rachel de Souza condemning the film for "glamorising and normalising" extreme pornography. Multiple firms withdrew their adverts after broadcast, and Ofcom received 160 complaints, which it declined to investigate. Channel 4's chief commissioning officer Ian Katz subsequently defended airing 1,000 Men and Me, Virgin Island, and Gaza: Doctors Under Attack at August's Edinburgh TV Festival. The show was watched by 2.1 million viewers in 28 days, making it the network's most watched documentary since Leaving Neverland.

=== 2025–present: Pregnancy ===
Blue attempted to start a freshers' week tour in Dundee in September 2025, but she had to move its launch to Glasgow following criticism from the University of Dundee's Feminist Society and multiple politicians including East Kilbride and Strathaven's MP Joani Reid. She was also criticised by a local councillor for visiting Oxford, and was assaulted during her visit to Sheffield; the latter was dealt with out of court. By October, Blue had appeared on the podcasts Fin vs The Internet and Modern Wisdom, and had filmed scenes for the sitcom B-Teem; a November interview by Nine Network's A Current Affair was defended on the show's website and subsequently broadcast as an MA15+ "extended special" for the network's paid subscription service Stan.

In December 2025, while visiting Bali, she and at least 17 men were arrested on suspicion of producing pornography, following which she was deported for working on a tourist visa and fined Rp 200,000 (about £9) for traffic violations. Upon her return to London, she filmed footage of herself outside the Indonesian embassy in the United Kingdom dragging an Indonesian flag behind her on the floor, prompting criticism from Indonesia's government. She was later charged with outraging public decency over footage filmed on the occasion, although the charges were subsequently dropped. That year, she was the fourth-most searched-for porn star on Pornhub and the fifth-most searched-for topic by UK users of Google Search.

ABC News's Facebook account posted pictures of Blue, Phillips, and Anthony Albanese in January 2026 after it was hacked. The following month, she claimed to have had unprotected sex with about 400 men on 7 February, and to be pregnant. The latter caused fans to tag a Twitter account that parodied The Maury Show, a show which explored paternity disputes, which in turn went viral after asking them not to. She subsequently filmed content using a prosthetic bump, announced a "golden baby shower" event in which she invited members of the public to urinate on her on 6 June 2026, and defended the latter in an interview with Shelagh Fogarty of LBC. Her urination event prompted condemnation from both sides of the political spectrum, with some calling for interventions from social services. Blue announced the birth of her child at the Lindo Wing of St Mary's Hospital in London on Instagram in August 2026 alongside a montage of her pregnancy set to "Turning Page" by Sleeping at Last.

== Personal life and reception ==
The Derby Telegraph wrote in January 2025 that Blue was a regular at Derby County F.C. games. She dated Lil Mabu in March 2025, who wrote the song "Bonnie Blu" about her, and endorsed Nigel Farage and the tax and immigration policies of his party Reform UK in December 2025. Blue has repeatedly defended having sex with 18-year-olds on the grounds that those complaining about the young age of her co-stars should instead lobby governments to increase the age of consent. Her content makes use of aggressive language such as telling men that she wants to be their "slut" or their "cum rag" and is unusual for her not attempting to fake orgasms. In July 2025, Blue attributed the latter to her attention being on other aspects of filming, Lucy Morgan of Glamour wrote that her content used "much of the same language as mainstream porn", India Block of The Standard likened her videos to the performance art of Marina Abramović, and Pravina Rudra of The i Paper described her as the "endpoint of capitalism". She has also been described by Owen Williams's book Sex, Death and Pathetic Ambition as "the female Marquis de Sade", and mentioned alongside Lily Phillips in Zoe Strimpel's book Good Slut as examples of the idea that sex work is work.
