= The Fellas Studios =

English podcasting production company

- Type: Private
- Industry: Podcasting and online video content
- Founded: 2020
- Founder: Callum Airey; Joshua Larkin
- Headquarters: London, United Kingdom
- Parent: Global Media & Entertainment
- Website: fellasstudiosburgar.com

The Fellas Studios is an English audio and video based podcasting production company based in London and was founded in 2020 by YouTubers Callum Airey (Calfreezy) and Joshua Larkin (TheBurntChip).

The company, whose roster accumulated more than 1.7 billion views in 2023, produces many top UK podcasts hosted by various social media influencers and TV personalities. Some of these podcasts include Saving Grace with GK Barry, The Fellas with Calfreezy, TheBurntChip, and Alfie Buttle (AB) Not My Bagg with Joe Baggs and Chloe Vs The World with Chloe Burrows.

== History ==
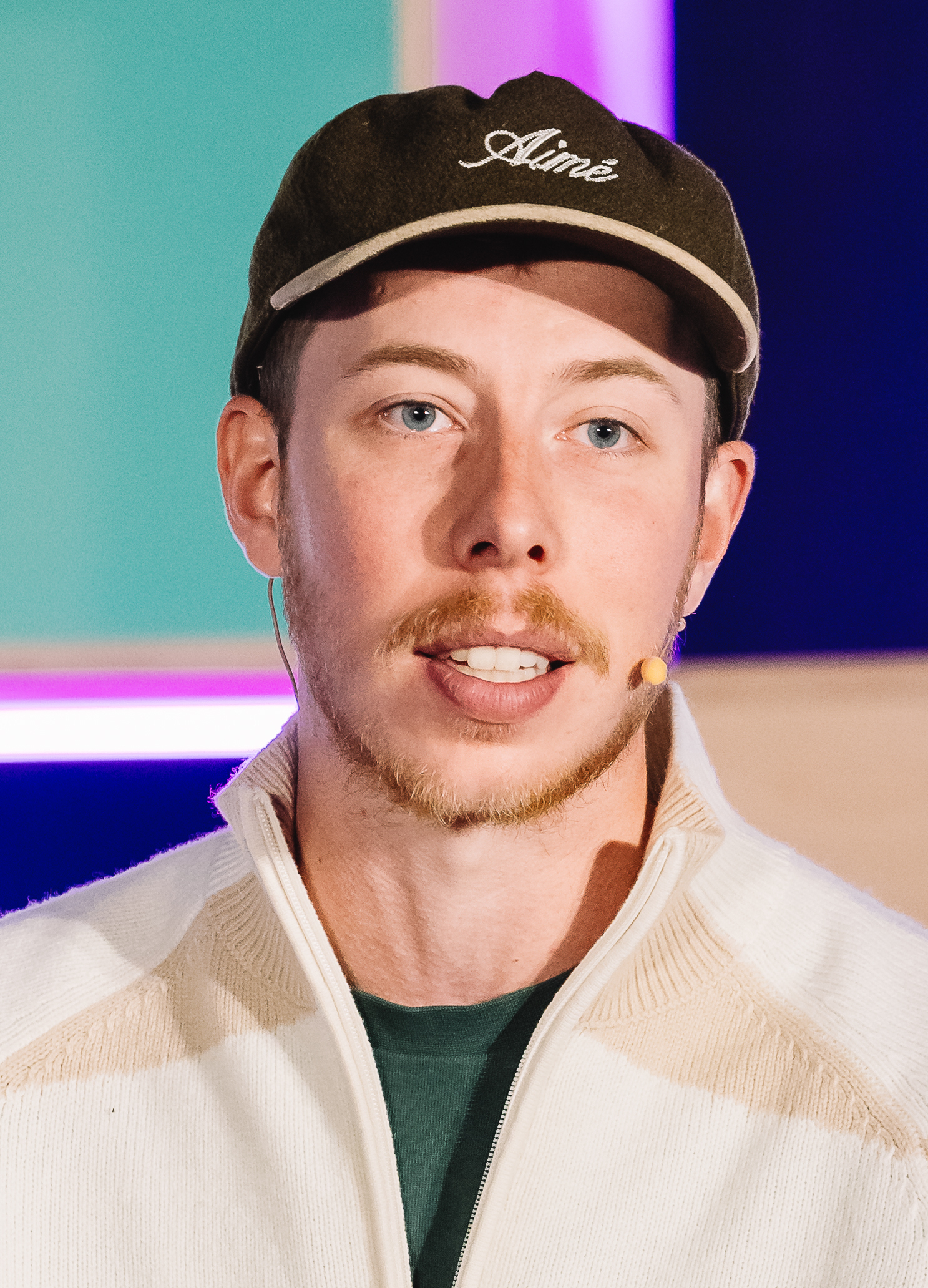
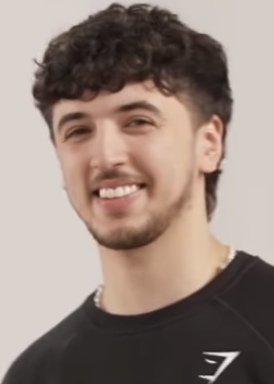
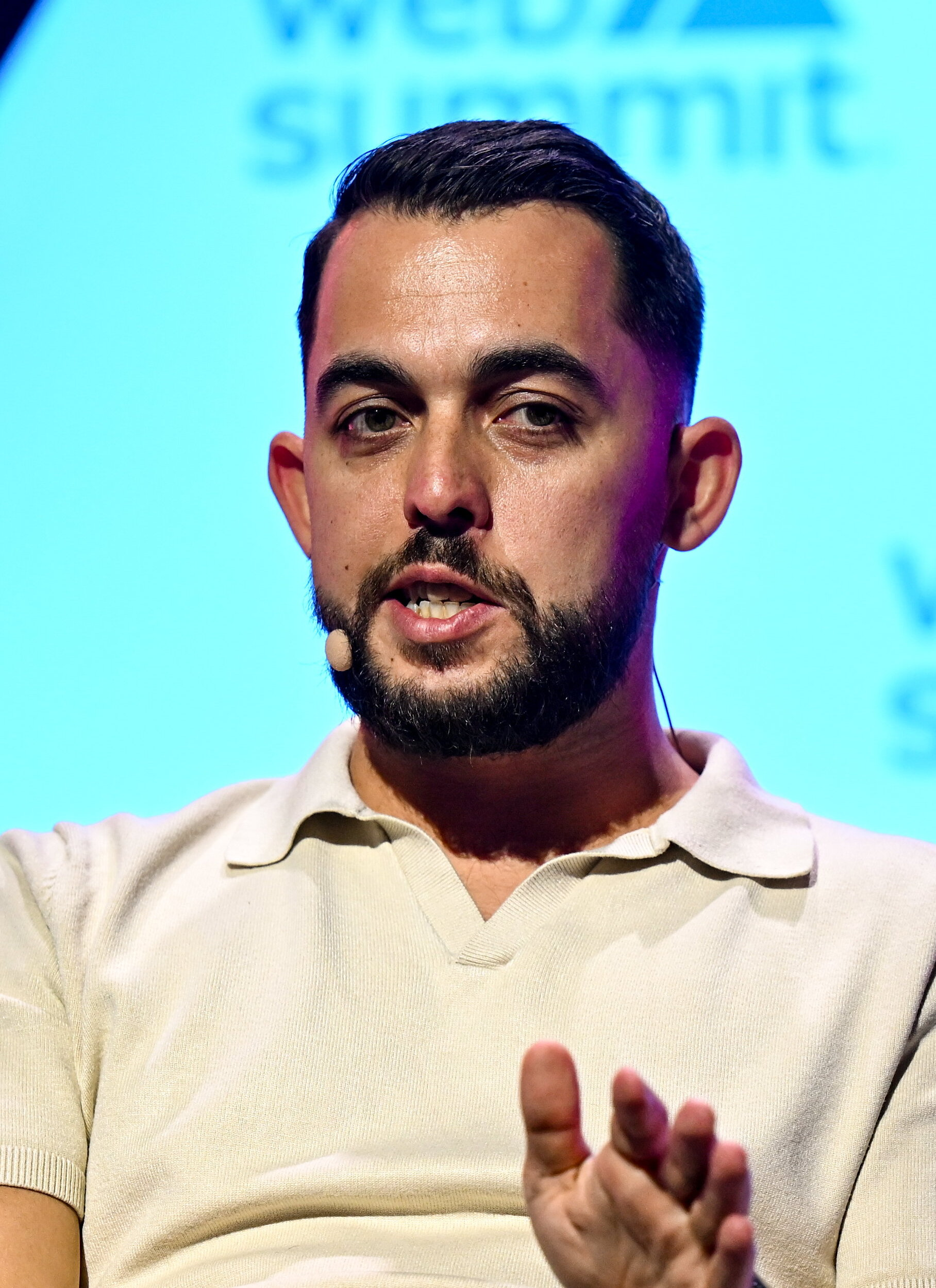
CEOs Airey (left) and Larkin (middle) and COO Hackney (right)

The Fellas Studios was founded in 2021, shortly after the launch of its flagship and self-titled podcast The Fellas hosted by founders Callum Airey and Joshua Larkin. Due to the success of the podcast, the pair were able to launch further podcasts hosted by various creators and personalities, the first of which being Pitchside, which saw YouTubers Theo Baker, Tom Garratt and Reev discussing football-related content and doing watchalongs on livestreams, one of which would go viral after host Garratt snapped his arm while competing in an arm wrestle with co-host Baker.

The production house saw a £1.5 million investment from fellow online creators KSI as well as his YouTube group the Sidemen in 2023. Other investors included in the deal were WillNE, ChrisMD and Callux.

Airey stated in 2023 that the business "wanted to shift away from how podcasts were traditionally structured for creators and build not only individual shows but entire brands" and that the large investments were "massive vindication of what we set out to do when we launched Fellas Studios back in 2021". Elliot Hackney, COO, also stated the investment allows them to "change the landscape even more than we already have [...] we’ve showed that the old podcast format is tired – video is a must, as is creating a brand around the talent and the show".

In 2024, GK Barry of Saving Grace completed a sell-out UK live tour of the podcast and the company moved all of its podcasts over to hosting service Acast.

In October 2025, Global Media & Entertainment acquired The Fellas Studios.

=== Other projects ===
In March 2024, the Fellas launched a subscription service and mobile app, titled Fellas Loaded where they would post exclusive content.

== Podcasts ==
Title	Host(s)	Genre	Premiere date (Note: Premiere dates are in relation to the first episode produced by The Fellas Studios.)	Finale date (Note: Finale dates are in relation to the last episode produced by The Fellas Studios.)	Ref.
Ami Charlize's Private Story	Ami Charlize	Beauty	26 November 2025	—N/a	
Antics With Ash	Ash Holme	Comedy	23 November 2023	29 August 2024	
Bach and Arthur Podcast	ItalianBach & ArthurTV (Arthur Frederick)	Comedy	20 February 2025	—N/a	
Back Side	Theo Baker, Tom Garratt, Reev & Lewis Bowden	Comedy	18 April 2024	—N/a	
Chloe Vs The World	Chloe Burrows	Comedy	4 April 2023	—N/a	
The Club	Rory Jennings, Adam McKola & Buvey	Sport	22 January 2023	—N/a	
Dad V Girls After Hours	Joel Conder & Sarah Conder	Parenting	3 February 2024	—N/a	
DEEP IT!	Adeola Patronne & Mariam Musa	Culture	28 October 2024	25 May 2026	
Family Ties	TBJZL, Manny & Jedidiah	Comedy	7 May 2025	—N/a	
The Fellas	Calfreezy, TheBurntChip & Alfie Buttle (AB)	Comedy	3 November 2020	—N/a	
The Fellas Mysteries	Calfreezy & TheBurntChip	True crime	13 September 2021	26 December 2022	
Growing Paynes	Behzinga & Faith Kelly	Comedy	13 July 2023	25 July 2024	
The History Diaries	Katie Kennedy	History	16 October 2025	—N/a	
Hype Report	Culture Force	Fashion	6 November 2023	15 April 2024	
Internet Dads	Spencer Owen & Rory Jennings	Parenting	30 January 2025	13 November 2025	
The Last Lap	Tommo & Niran	Sport	29 August 2022	28 November 2023	
Low IQ	Jack Joseph & Cole Anderson-James	Comedy	14 September 2023	12 June 2025	
Not My Bagg	Joe Baggs	Comedy	27 September 2022	—N/a	
Oh, Anna!	Anastasia Kingsnorth & Julie Stanton	Culture	4 March 2026	—N/a	
The Old & Bald Podcast	Harry Pinero & Darkest Man	Comedy	14 October 2026	—N/a	
Pitch Side	Theo Baker, Tom Garratt, Reev & Lewis Bowden	Sport	21 September 2021	—N/a	
Prodcast	Proddy C	Comedy	25 November 2024	8 May 2025	
Punchin'	Danny Aarons & Tennessee Thresh	Comedy	5 March 2025	—N/a	
The Pyramid	Tom Garratt & Callum Fowler	Sport	11 August 2026	—N/a	
Radio Rufus	Rufus Rice & Aidan Rafferty	Comedy	28 February 2024	24 September 2025	
Saving Grace	GK Barry	Comedy	20 April 2022	—N/a	
See It Off	Bambino Becky	Comedy	30 June 2026	—N/a	
Wafflin'	Joe Weller, Theo Baker & Luke Martin	Comedy	22 September 2024	26 October 2025	

== See also ==
- List of podcasting companies
