= Rob Brydon's Annually Retentive =

- Rob Brydon & Dave Willson on the set of Annually Retentive for Series 2, Episode 2
- Genre: Comedy; Parody
- Presented by: Rob Brydon
- Starring: Dave Gorman; Jane Moore
- Country of origin: United Kingdom
- Original language: English
- No. of series: 2
- No. of episodes: 12

Production
- Running time: 30 minutes

Original release
- Network: BBC Three
- Release: 11 July 2006 – 4 June 2007

Rob Brydon's Annually Retentive is a British television show, first aired on BBC Three in July 2006. Devised by Paul Duddridge, it concerns the making of a comedy panel game show called Annually Retentive, themed around historical events, and hosted by Welsh comedian Rob Brydon. The show is deliberately parodic, as Brydon plays a hyper-realised (and exaggeratedly nasty) version of himself, while the game show blatantly steals ideas from other, similar shows such as Have I Got News for You, Never Mind the Buzzcocks, Mock the Week and QI.

== Format ==
Its show-within-a-show format is reminiscent of The Larry Sanders Show which explored the blurring of reality and fantasy except with the focus of a talk show as opposed to a panel game. The show cuts between fictionalised scenes that see Brydon and the producers making the panel game, and scenes from the game show itself. These latter segments were filmed in full, as if Annually Retentive were a real show, in front of live audiences at BBC Television Centre who, initially, were not made aware of its intentionally derivative and uninspired nature. A good portion of the game show segments were scripted; however, the panellists were allowed to 'play out' the game as if it were real, and occasionally improvise.

The two team captains were Dave Gorman and Jane Moore. Each episode was made available to UK viewers to watch on the BBC Three website a week before it aired. A second series began airing on Monday 30 April 2007 at 10.30pm; the 'gameshow' portion was filmed on 11 and 12 January 2007. The theme tune used is "Reelin' In the Years" by Steely Dan, though on the DVD release the song is replaced with an original piece. The first series has been released on DVD. The second series was released on 23 November 2009.

== Episodes guide ==
=== Series one ===
#	Original air date	Dave Gorman's team	Jane Moore's team	Also featuring
1	11 July 2006	Richard Bacon, Gail Porter	David Mitchell, Lucy Porter	Jonathan Ross
2	18 July 2006	Steve Furst, John Inverdale	Alistair McGowan, Dominik Diamond	David Walliams
3	25 July 2006	Josie D'Arby, Robert Webb	Russell Brand, Marcus Brigstocke	
4	1 August 2006	Boyd Hilton, Ronni Ancona	Jo Brand, Paul Foot	Kirsten O'Brien, Dave Chapman
5	8 August 2006	Alexei Sayle, Dave Berry	Omid Djalili, Bob Mills	Elton John, Dave Chapman
6	15 August 2006	Trisha Goddard, Rob Deering	Gyles Brandreth, Sue Perkins	

=== Series two ===
#	Original air date	Dave Gorman's team	Jane Moore's team	Also featuring
1	30 April 2007	Rhys Thomas, Abi Titmuss	Richard Herring, Jimmy Carr	Eamonn Holmes, Ruth Langsford
2	7 May 2007	Dave Willson,^{A} Phil Hammond	Jennie Bond, Chris Corcoran	Claudia Winkleman, Anton du Beke
3	14 May 2007	Richard Park, Olivia Lee	Griff Rhys Jones, Paul Ross	Rhys Ifans
4	21 May 2007	James Corden, Hal Cruttenden	Robin Ince, Dave Johns	Jimmy Carr
5	28 May 2007	Frankie Boyle, Kate Lawler	Russell Howard, Rory Bremner	Tim Key
6^{B}	4 June 2007	Rufus Hound, Kirsten O'Brien	Mathew Horne, Jeremy Edwards	

^A Dave Willson is a member of the BBC Studios lighting team who stands in for June Sarpong after she fails to appear.
^B For episode 2.6, the usual gameshow format was changed to show Brydon appearing in a mock episode of the BBC's Who Do You Think You Are? series. This episode opens with the end credits of an episode of the gameshow.

== Regular cast ==
- Rob Brydon – host
- Ruth Bratt
- Steve Furst
- Dave Gorman
- Russell Tovey
- Dominic Holland
- Sharon Horgan
- Katy Brand
- Alice Lowe
- Jane Moore
- Phil Nichol
- Curtis Walker
- Ken Bruce

== Reception ==
Previewing a rerun of the first series, Ed Potton of The Times found that the series "provides the perfect platform for host Brydon, playing a demonic version of himself, to mimic (often hilariously) and abuse (often brutally) his guests". Ahead of the second series, Mark Wright of The Stage called the show an "acquired taste", but appreciated "the nonsense that is the panel quiz that successfully apes some of the nonsense panel games we are subjected to for real." He concluded, "[it is] one of the most intriguing comedies to come out of BBC3, and one that easily deserves a third commission."
