= Anastasia Kingsnorth =

British YouTuber and influencer (born 2000)

- Born: 13 October 2000 (age 26); Northamptonshire, England
- Occupations: YouTuber; podcaster; influencer
- Years active: 2012–present
- Works: Relationship Status: My survival guide to love, dating and heartbreak (book)
- Mother: Julie Stanton

Anastasia Kingsnorth (born 13 October 2000) is a British fashion YouTuber, social media influencer and podcaster. She first started her YouTube career in 2012 when she was eleven years old. She has also collaborated with many brands. Kingsnorth later moved onto podcasting where she co-hosted the Sex, Lies & DM Slides podcast with influencer Saffron Barker in 2022 as well as Oh, Anna! with her mother Julie Stanton in 2026. Kingsnorth also published her book titled Relationship Status: My survival guide to love, dating and heartbreak in 2024 which talks about modern dating. Her debut book reached The Sunday Times bestseller.

== Life and career ==
Anastasia Kingsnorth was born in Northamptonshire, England on 13 October 2000 to mother Julie Stanton. Kingsnorth has a younger brother. She first started her YouTube channel when she was eleven years old in 2012, initially under the name 'Floral Princess'. She also started one under the name 'Anastasia Moshi' where she unboxed Moshi Monster toys; she has since stated "I started opening toys and I loved it. I don't know why I started doing it, I guess I just really fancied filming videos". She planned to study photography, English literature and either biology or physics for sixth form but dropped out as she had 250k subscribers on YouTube at the time and, according to her, "my YouTube channel took off" that year. She later uploaded makeup tutorials, hauls, lifestyle content and challenge videos to her YouTube channel. In addition to YouTube, Kingsnorth also publishes content to her Instagram and TikTok. As of March 2026, Kingsnorth had over one million followers on Instagram and 1.34 million subscribers on YouTube.

When Kingsnorth was sixteen years old, she appeared on Channel 5's reality series Not So Sweet Sixteen. However, she was cut off from the final edit which focused on her friend instead. Kingsnorth and other YouTubers attended the Stars Get Slimey in Blackpool for SLIMEFEST in October 2017. She later got slimed on CBBC Saturday Mash Up. She has also collaborated with many brands such as ASOS and H&M. During the Covid-19 lockdowns in April 2020, Kingsnorth took part in the NHS fundraising livestream alongside YouTuber Saffron Barker and singer Lady Leshurr. Six months later, she collaborated with Skinnydip and launched a 30-piece collection which includes phone cases, makeup bags and dressing gowns. Kingsnorth later made a cameo appearance at Britain's Got Talent the following year.

Kingsnorth launched a podcast titled Sex, Lies & DM Slides together with her best friend Saffron Barker in October 2022 on Spotify. It was originally created by Gizzi Erskine and Sydney Lima in 2020, who made it a hit Spotify Original podcast, before being replaced by Barker and Kingsnorth shortly after Spotify filed a trademark application in July 2022. She later took part in BBC Radio 1's TikTok Takeover on Christmas Day. She said, "I am so excited to be taking over BBC Radio 1 for some time on Christmas Day. I’ve got the perfect Christmas songs lined up I know everyone is going to love, I hope everyone is excited to listen!" Kingsnorth later visited and toured around a Love Island villa in South Africa in 2023, before the season's premiere on ITV. She also partnered with ITV in order to create teaser content for Love Island.

She published her book titled Relationship Status: My survival guide to love, dating and heartbreak in 2024, shortly after Ebury Spotlight acquired it. It covers topics relating to modern dating after she "re-entered her single girl era". Her debut book was a Sunday Times bestseller. She later took part in a government campaign in February 2024 to combat loneliness, alongside Tasha Ghouri, Josh Patterson, Bobby Brazier, Bradley Riches, and Bronte King. The following year, she met up with British model Lottie Moss in an episode of the Dream On podcast in June 2025 where Kingsnorth "opens up about life, love, and the unfiltered reality of growing up in the spotlight".

In March 2026, she started her own podcast together with her mother Julie Stanton, titled Oh, Anna! Produced by The Fellas Studios, the podcast is released every Wednesday on YouTube and Apple Podcasts. It talks about humour, family stories and everyday life. That same year, she attended the Brit Awards 2026.

== Personal life ==
In addition to her mother, Kingsnorth also has a brother. She has a close relationship with her mother and brother, but not her estranged father, and says that she's "happy with it being just the three of them". She later moved from Northamptonshire to Manchester in 2021 to live with her friends. She also once dated YouTuber Morgz back in 2017.
