= Jane Moore =

English journalist and television personality (born 1962)

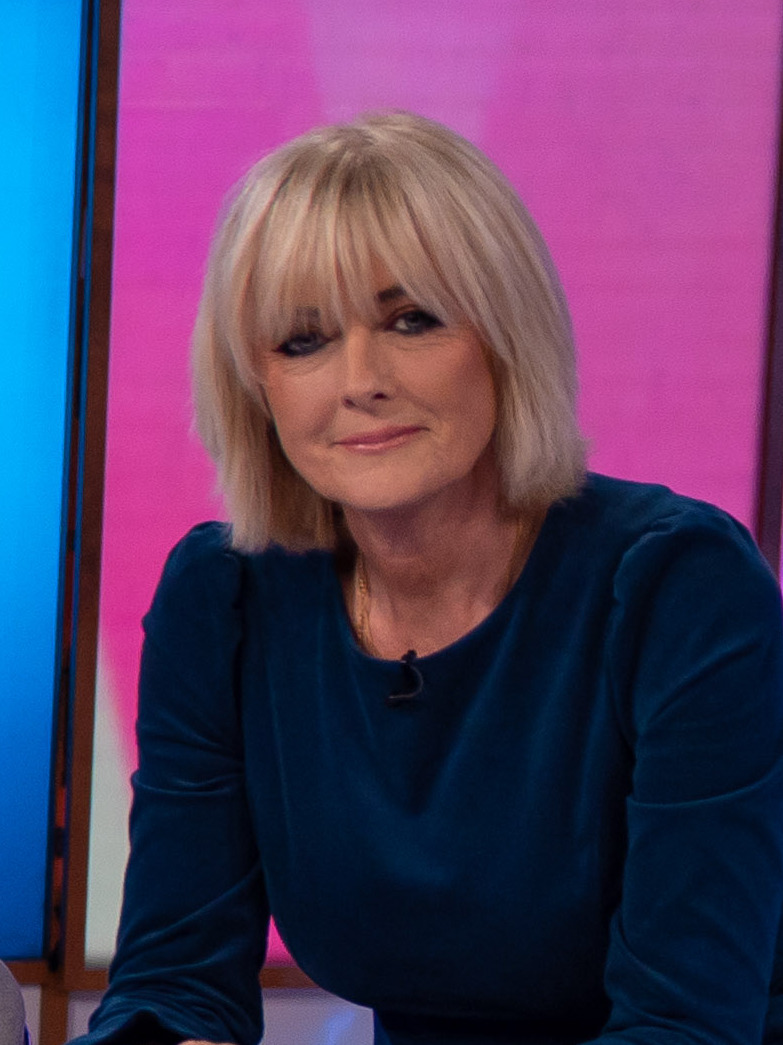
- Moore in 2024
- Born: 17 May 1962 (age 64); Oxford, Oxfordshire, England
- Education: South Glamorgan Institute of Higher Education
- Occupations: Journalist; writer; television personality
- Years active: 1981–present
- Television: Loose Women
- Spouse: Gary Farrow (m. 2002; sep. 2022)
- Children: 3

Jane Moore (born 17 May 1962) is an English journalist, writer, and television personality. She is a columnist for the tabloid The Sun and writes regular articles for the newspaper The Sunday Times. She was a panellist and anchor on the ITV lunchtime chat show Loose Women between 1999 and 2002, returning as a regular panellist from 2013 onwards. Since 2018, Moore has been regularly relief-anchoring Loose Women. In 2024, Moore appeared as a contestant on the twenty-fourth series of the ITV reality show I'm a Celebrity...Get Me Out of Here!.

== Early life ==
Moore was born on 17 May 1962 in Oxford. Her father was a professor of mathematics at the University of Oxford, and her mother was a teacher. She went to primary school in Oxford, then attended the Worcester Grammar School for Girls on Spetchley Road in Worcester, when her parents divorced. Following the divorce, she never heard from her father again. At school, Moore always wanted to be a journalist, but was told by her teachers that "it was no job for a lady". She studied journalism at the South Glamorgan Institute of Higher Education in Cardiff, then trained at the Solihull News in 1981, moving to work full-time at the Birmingham Mail and the Birmingham Post.

== Career ==
Moore was a news editor for the Sunday Sport. She has since worked as a columnist for The Sun and written regular articles for The Sunday Times. She has also written for Hello. In 2006, she was nominated for a British Press Award in the category of Columnist of the Year, but lost out to Lucy Kellaway.

Moore was a panellist on the ITV chat show Loose Women between 1999 and 2002. She returned to the programme on 15 October 2013, having appeared on the panel ever since, as well as regularly anchoring the show since 2018.

In April 2002, Moore was a guest presenter on This Morning. She subsequently moved to the BBC and regularly contributed to Question Time (2002–2012), The Andrew Marr Show (2005–21), This Week (2003–2015) and BBC Breakfast. Moore guest presented The Wright Stuff in 2003 and 2004, and was a panellist in 2008. She guest presented the show again in February 2011.

Moore set up the consumer website Youthejury.com in 2006; however, the website was later registered defunct. From 2006 to 2007, Moore was a team captain on the BBC Three programme Rob Brydon's Annually Retentive, a comedy take on celebrity panel shows. In July 2011, she presented the six-part BBC Two series Wonderstuff. Moore has also contributed to the Channel 4 programme Dispatches and has presented a number of online videos for the broadcaster. She also revealed in October 2021 on an episode of Loose Women that she was briefly an estate agent.

In November 2024, Moore appeared as a contestant on the twenty-fourth series of I'm a Celebrity...Get Me Out of Here!. She became the first celebrity to be eliminated from camp after receiving the fewest votes.

== Personal life ==
Moore married Gary Farrow, the former vice-president of communications at Sony Music Entertainment, in 2002. Elton John was the best man at their wedding. Her husband owns a PR agency called The Corporation Group. They lived in Richmond, with their daughters, and their Tibetan terrier dog named Jasper.

On 7 December 2022, while on-air on ITV's Loose Women, Moore revealed that she and her husband were to separate, but that their amicable marital split had suffered a delay, due to Farrow's broken leg after a fall, and she was acting as a carer.

== Filmography ==
| Year | Title | Channel | Role | Ref. |
|---|---|---|---|---|
| 1999–2002, 2013–present | Loose Women | ITV | Regular panellist (1999–2002, 2013–present), regular relief anchor (2018–present) | |
| 2000–2001 | Crimewatch Daily | BBC One | Co-presenter | |
| 2001–2004 | Breakfast with Frost | BBC One | Guest | |
| 2002 | This Morning | ITV | Guest presenter | |
| 2003–2005, 2007–2008, 2011 | The Wright Stuff | Channel 5 | Guest presenter/panellist | |
| 2004–2007 | Grumpy Old Women | BBC Two | Contributor | |
| 2005–2007 | Richard & Judy | Channel 4 | Regular contributor | |
| 2005–2021 | The Andrew Marr Show | BBC One | Newspaper reviewer | |
| 2005–2015 | This Week | BBC One | Newspaper reviewer and reporter | |
| 2006 | Grumpy Old Holidays | BBC Two | Contributor | |
| 2006–2007 | Rob Brydon's Annually Retentive | BBC Three | Team captain | |
| 2008 | Dispatches | Channel 4 | Regular reporter | |
| 2011 | Wonderstuff | BBC Two | Presenter | |
| 2012–2016 | The Agenda | ITV | Regular panellist | |
| 2022 | Dispatches: Airport Chaos Undercover | Channel 4 | Reporter | |
| 2023 | Who Killed Jill Dando? | Netflix | Contributor | |
| 2024 | I'm a Celebrity...Get Me Out of Here! | ITV1 | Contestant; series 24 | |

Guest appearances

- Have I Got News for You (4 May 2001)
- The Weakest Link: Presenters Special (24 December 2001)
- Never Mind the Buzzcocks (12 January 2004)
- The Apprentice: You're Fired! (26 April 2006, 2 May 2007, 14 May 2008, 3 June 2009)
- The Sharon Osbourne Show (16 October 2006)
- News 24 Sunday (5 August 2007)
- Countdown (26–30 October 2009)
- Genius (4 October 2010)
- Pointless Celebrities (5 November 2016)
- After the News (24 October 2017)
- The Chase: Celebrity Special (21 October 2018)
