= Ella Rutherford =

English footballer (born 2000)

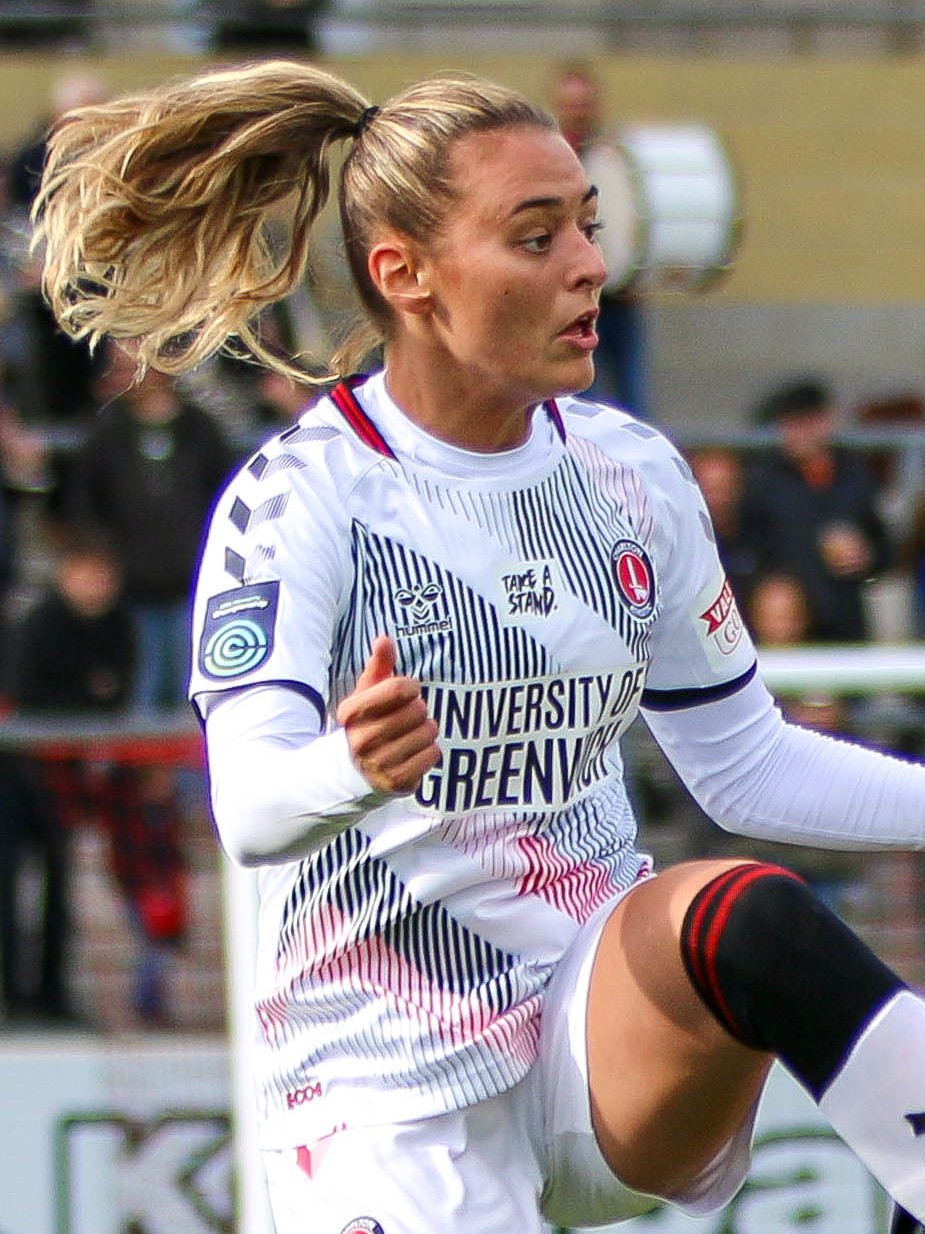
- Rutherford playing for Charlton Athletic W.F.C. in October 2021

Personal information
- Full name: Ella Melanie Rutherford
- Date of birth: 28 April 2000 (age 26)
- Place of birth: Sidcup, England
- Position: Striker

Team information
- Current team: Millwall
- Number: 19

Youth career
- 2011–2017: Millwall

Senior career*
Years	Team	Apps	(Gls)
2017–2018	Millwall	14	(7)
2018–2020	Bristol City	20	(2)
2019	→ Crystal Palace (loan)	8	(2)
2020	→ Leicester City (loan)	4	(1)
2020–2024	Charlton Athletic	41	(5)
2024–2025	Ipswich Town	4	(3)
2025–2026	Portsmouth	3	(0)
2026–	Millwall	1	(2)

International career^{‡}
- England U15
2016	England U16		
2016–2017	England U17	6	(0)
2019	England U19	11	(4)
- * Club domestic league appearances and goals as of 20:50, 10 July 2023 (UTC) ‡ National team caps and goals as of 20:50, 10 July 2023 (UTC)

Ella Melanie Rutherford (born 28 April 2000) is an English footballer who plays as an attacking midfielder for London and South East Women's Regional Football League Premier Division club Millwall.

== Club career ==
=== Millwall Lionesses ===
Rutherford spent most of her youth career at Millwall's Centre of Excellence, playing for Millwall's youth teams. Rutherford made her senior debut at 16 playing for Millwall Lionesses during the 2017 FA WSL 2 Spring Series. She finished the Spring Series as joint top scorer for the Lionesses with three goals in six appearances and was named the club's Young Player of the Year. During the following 2017–18 season she was named an FA WSL 2 Breakout Star.

=== Bristol City ===
In July 2018, Rutherford left Millwall alongside a raft of other players as the club faced financial difficulties. After a trial with Arsenal, Rutherford signed with Bristol City. Ahead of the 2019–20 season, Rutherford went on loan to FA Women's Championship team Crystal Palace. On 6 January 2020, Rutherford joined FA Women's Championship team Leicester City on loan until the end of the season.

On 1 June 2026, Rutherford announced her retirement from professional football.

=== Return to Millwall ===
On 1 July 2026, Millwall Lionesses announced that Rutherford had rejoined the club via their Instagram channel, with the player stating that she wanted to be back in love with football again, and that Millwall was the best place to do that.

== International career ==
Rutherford has represented England at the under-15, under-16, under-17 and under-19 levels.

== Personal life ==
Rutherford is in a relationship with social media personality Grace Keeling, who is also known as GK Barry.
