= Dean McCullough =

Northern Irish radio presenter (born 1992)

- Born: 9 July 1992 (age 34); Newtownabbey, County Antrim, Northern Ireland
- Education: Glengormley High School
- Occupation: Radio presenter
- Years active: 2010–present
- Known for: Gaydio (2018–2021); BBC Radio 1 (2020–2026)

Dean McCullough (born 9 July 1992) is a Northern Irish radio presenter and DJ. He became known for hosting Gaydio's breakfast show and later on BBC Radio 1. In 2024, he was a contestant on the twenty-fourth series of I'm a Celebrity...Get Me Out of Here!

== Early and personal life ==
McCullough was born on 9 July 1992. He is from Newtownabbey in the south-east of County Antrim in Northern Ireland. McCullough realised he was gay at the age of 11 or 12. He attended Glengormley High School and obtained a scholarship from Laine Theatre Arts.

== Career ==
McCullough began presenting on the radio as a volunteer for Wandsworth Radio. In May 2018, McCullough began presenting in the afternoon with Emma Goswell on Gaydio. Their show covered current LGBTQ+ issues. McCullough and Goswell moved on to present the Gaydio breakfast show until 2021.

In December 2020, McCullough filled in for Clara Amfo on BBC Radio 1 for two days. He returned in March 2021 to cover the early breakfast show on Fridays for five weeks. In September 2021, he began hosting the 10:30 to 13:00 slot on Radio 1, Fridays to Sundays, replacing Jordan North - who went on to host the station's weekday (except Fridays) drivetime show alongside Vick Hope. His show is broadcast from MediaCityUK in Salford.

In July 2022, it was announced that McCullough and Vicky Hawkesworth would replace Scott Mills and Chris Stark as co-hosts of Radio 1's afternoon show, from 1pm until 3.30 pm. Mills and Stark left Radio 1 to respectively present shows on Radio 2 and Capital.

Since 2023, McCullough has appeared regularly on Big Brother: Late & Live. In November 2024, McCullough appeared as a contestant on the twenty-fourth series of I'm a Celebrity...Get Me Out of Here!. He became the second campmate to be eliminated from the series, finishing in eleventh place.

In July 2024, McCullough moved from Radio 1's afternoon show to take on the early breakfast show, replacing Arielle Free who went on to host Radio 1's Rave Up show. He also started hosting hour-long editions of Radio 1's Pop Anthems show.

In July 2026, the BBC announced that McCullough was to leave Radio 1. He said it was a hard decision to leave after the "most incredible 6 years at Radio 1" but that it was "time for a change". His final Radio 1 show was broadcast on 3 September 2026.

McCullough’s first TV break was in E4’s Young, Free and Single Live. The reality show centred around a group of young singles living in London, navigating the dating scene. He was a cast member, starring alongside the UK’s most in demand hand model Thomas King. The show was hosted by Steve Jones and only ran for one series.
