= I'm a Celebrity...Get Me Out of Here! (British TV series) series 24 =

I'm a Celebrity...Get Me Out of Here!
- Series 24
- Presented by: Anthony McPartlin; Declan Donnelly
- No. of days: 22
- No. of castaways: 12
- Winner: Danny Jones
- Runner-up: Coleen Rooney
- Location: Murwillumbah, New South Wales, Australia
- Companion show: I'm a Celebrity: Unpacked
- No. of episodes: 22

Release
- Original network: ITV
- Original release: 17 November – 8 December 2024

Series chronology
- ← Previous; Series 23 Next → Series 25

I'm a Celebrity...Get Me Out of Here! returned for its twenty-fourth series on 17 November 2024 on ITV. The series was again filmed in Murwillumbah, New South Wales, with Ant & Dec returning to present the series. It was also confirmed that the show's spin-off would return, four years after being axed. It was given the new title I'm a Celebrity: Unpacked and was presented by Joel Dommett, alongside Sam Thompson and Kemi Rodgers.

On 8 December 2024, Danny Jones was declared the winner of the series, and ultimately the new "King of the Jungle", with Coleen Rooney and Rev. Richard Coles finishing in second and third place respectively. Jones is notably the second member of McFly to win the series, following his bandmate Dougie Poynter, who won the series in 2011.

== Production ==
Following the conclusion of the previous series, ITV confirmed that the show would return for a twenty-fourth series in November 2024. Prior to the beginning of the series, it was reported that the show would not feature any politicians on the series, following the controversy surrounding the casting of Matt Hancock and Nigel Farage in the previous two series respectively. Ant & Dec said they "think [the show should] do a year without politicians".

Prior to the beginning of the twenty-fourth series, it was announced that the programme's spin-off show, that regularly featured behind-the-scenes footage as well as interviews with contestants after they had been eliminated, would return after previously being axed in 2020. I'm a Celebrity: Unpacked was subsequently announced as the new companion show, with Joel Dommett, who hosted the previous spin-off I'm a Celebrity: Extra Camp until its axe, announced as the host, alongside Sam Thompson, who won the previous series of I'm a Celebrity, and Kemi Rodgers. The first trailer for the series premiered on 13 October 2024, and featured hosts Ant & Dec wearing lab coats and conducting experiments that resemble the bushtucker trials on various dummies at an "I'm a Celebrity..." test facility.

== Celebrities ==
The official line-up was announced by ITV on 11 November 2024. On 20 November 2024, Maura Higgins and Rev. Richard Coles were confirmed as this year's late arrivals.

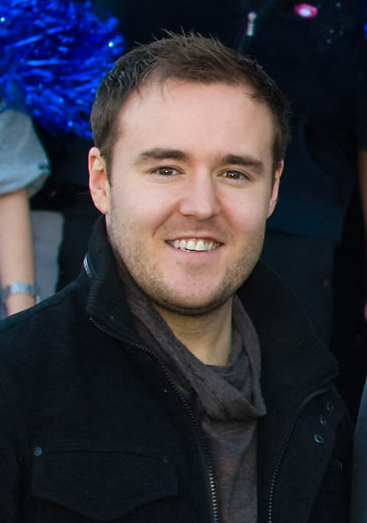
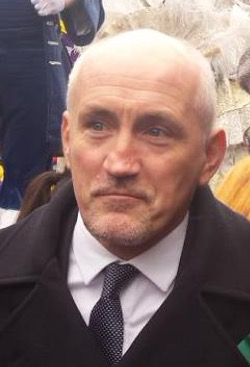
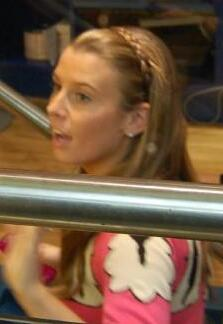
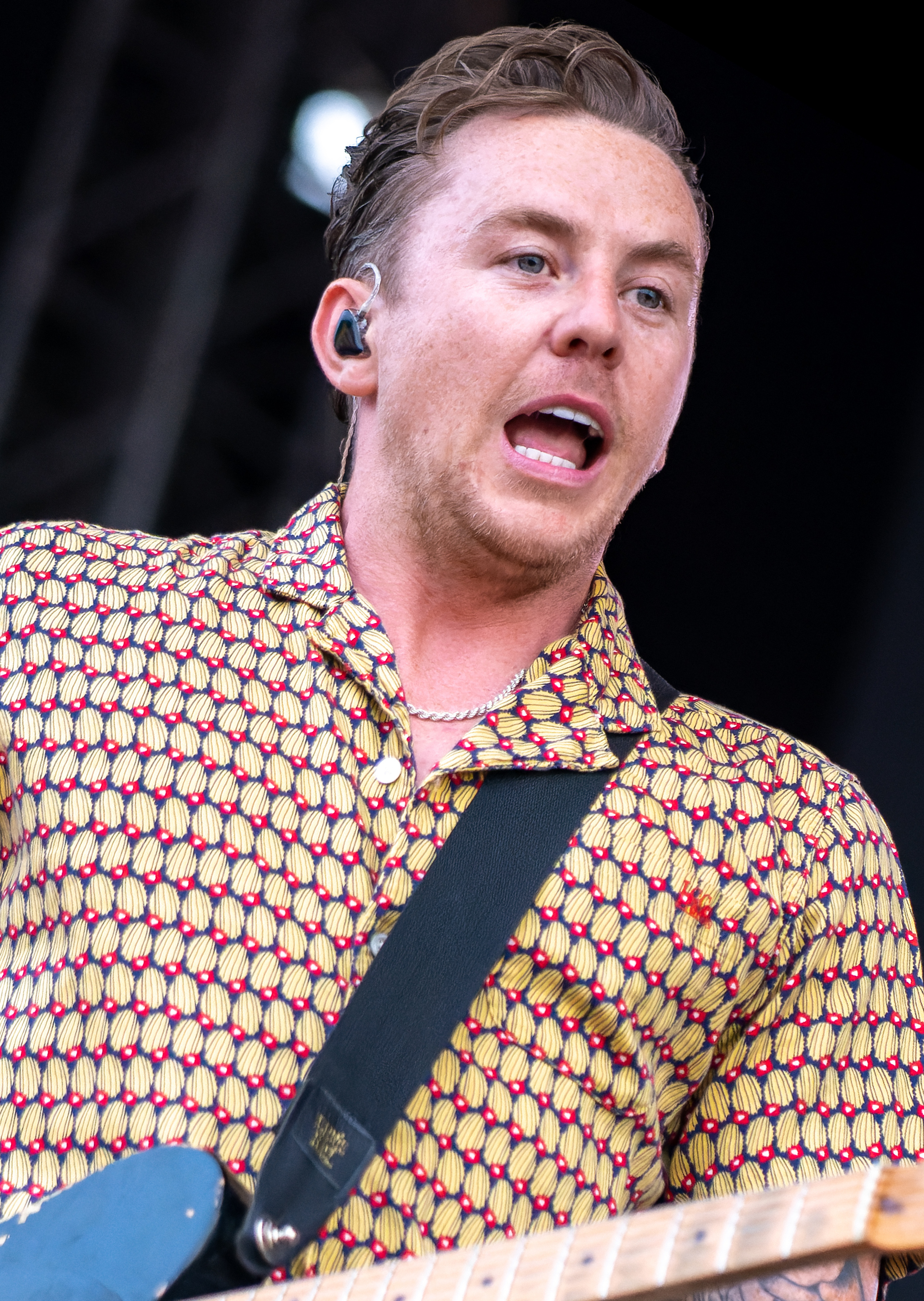
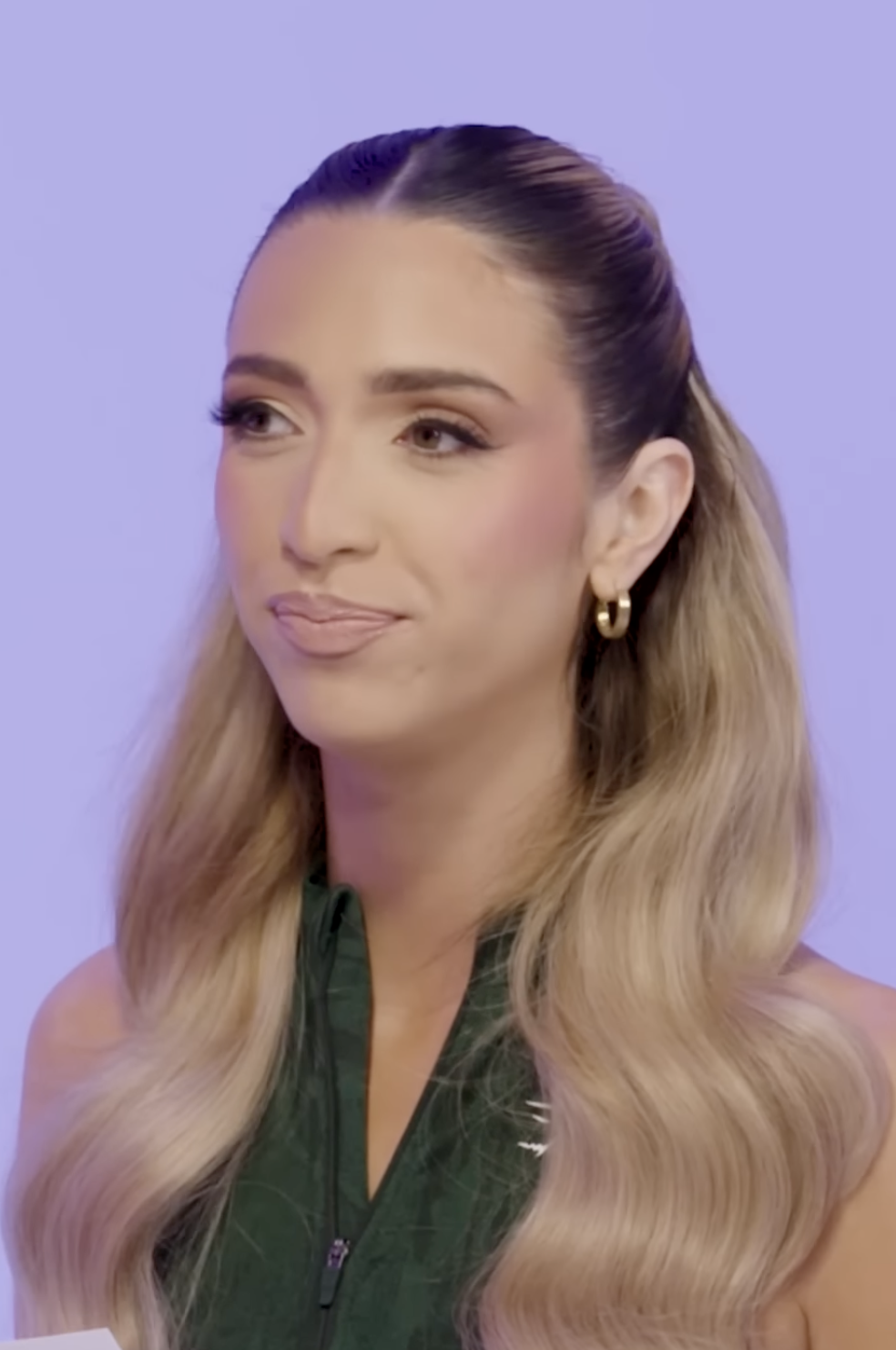
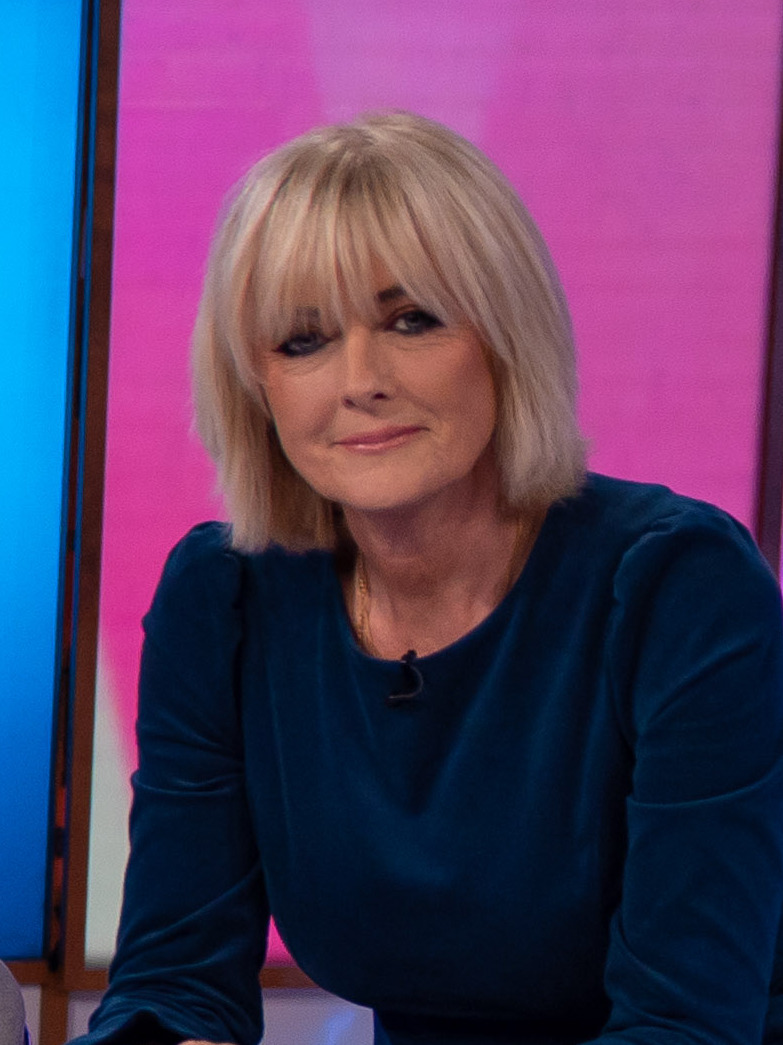
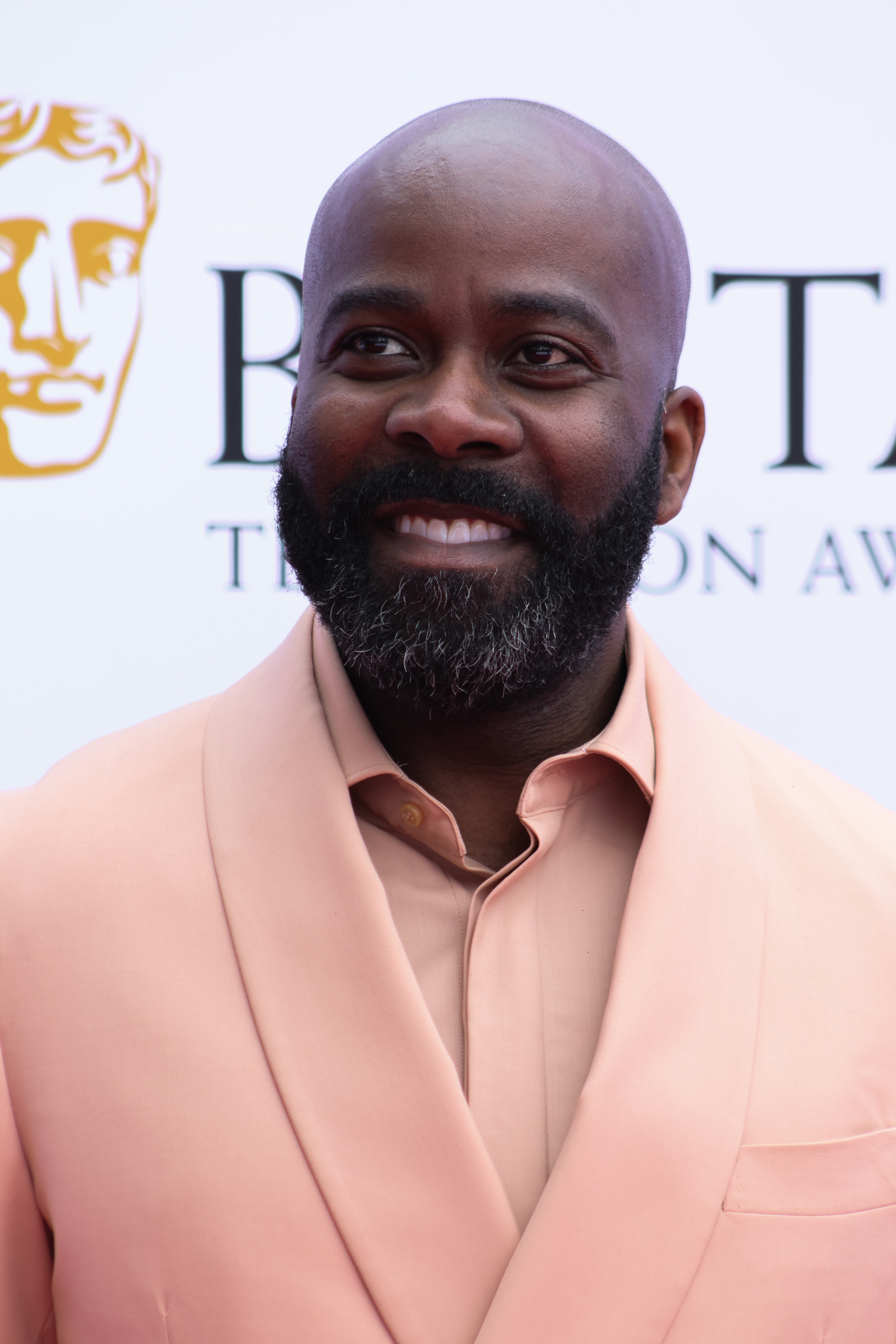
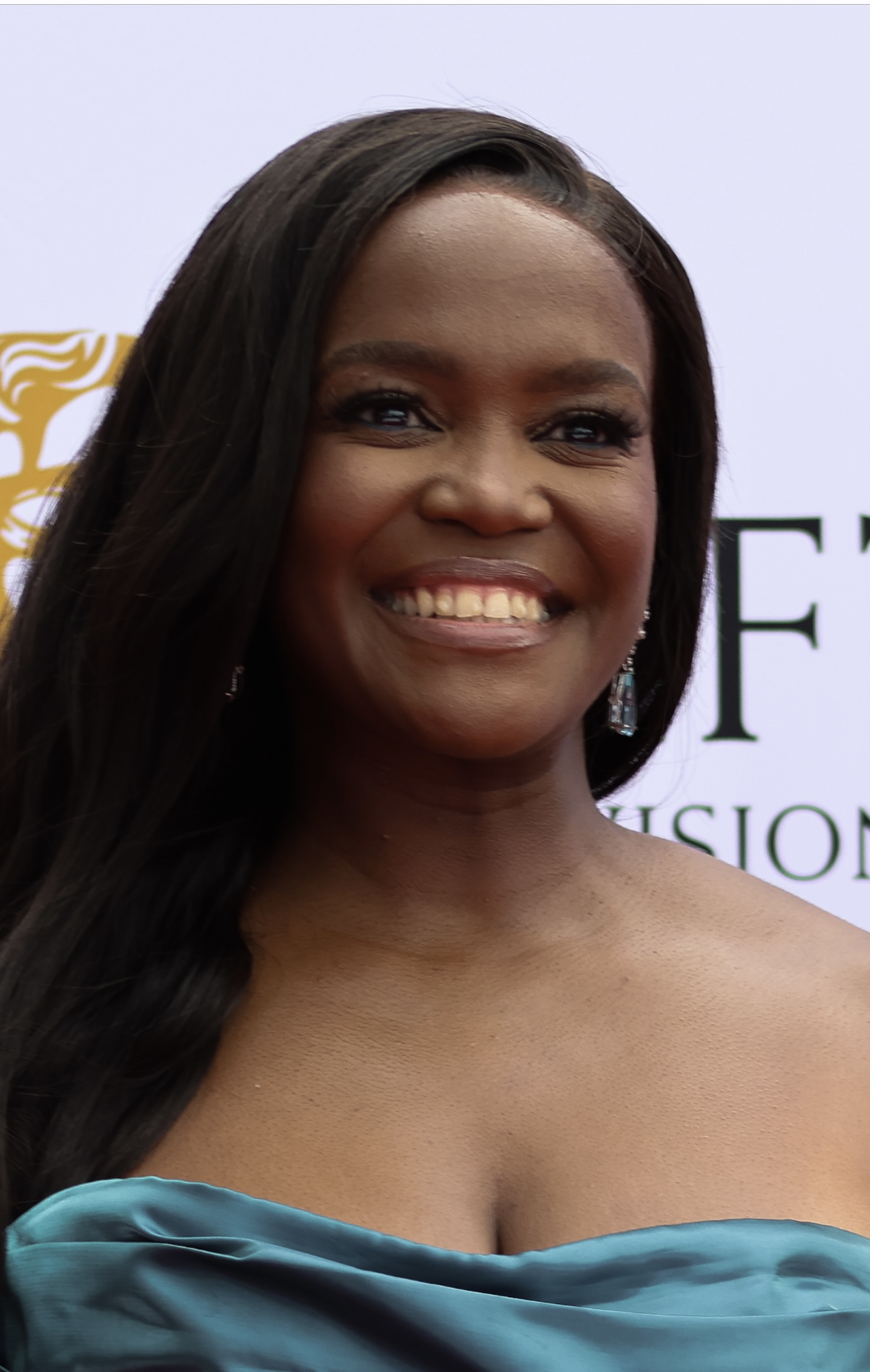
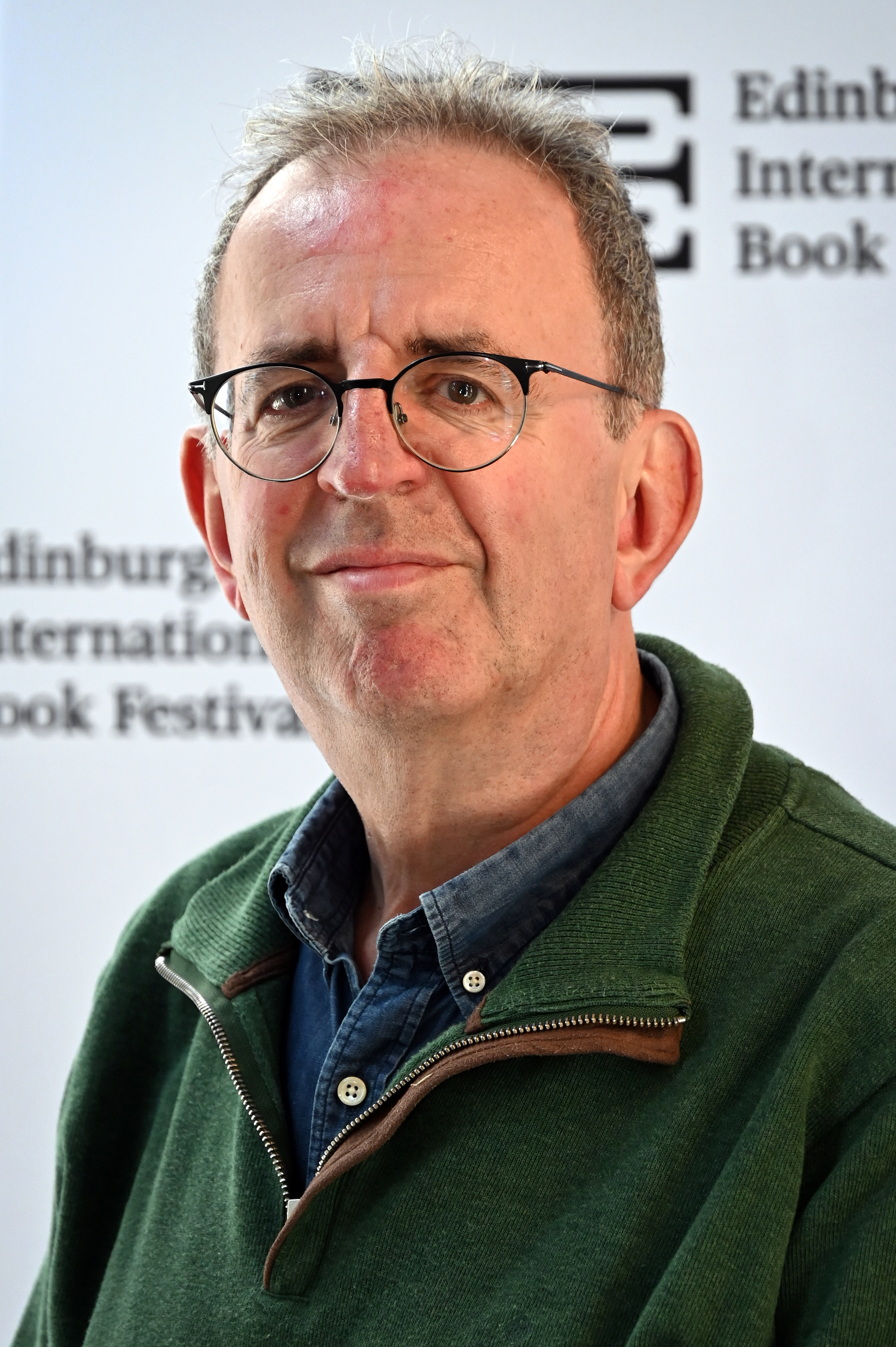
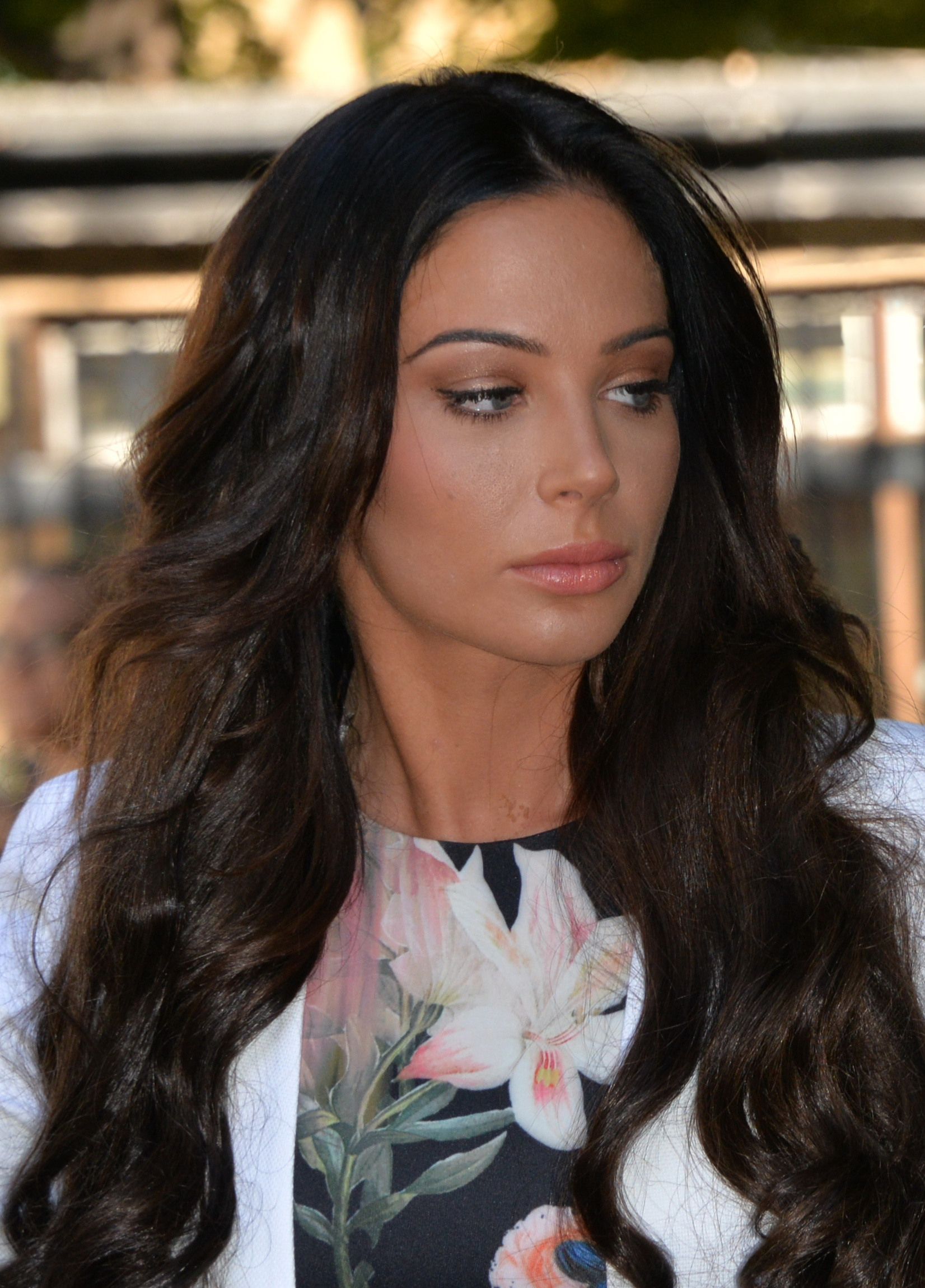
From left to right: Alan Halsall, Barry McGuigan, Coleen Rooney, Danny Jones, GK Barry, Jane Moore, Maura Higgins, Melvin Odoom, Oti Mabuse, Rev. Richard Coles and Tulisa.
Not pictured: Dean McCullough.

Celebrity	Known for	Status
Danny Jones	McFly singer	Winner on 8 December 2024
Coleen Rooney	Media personality & wife of Wayne Rooney	Runner-up on 8 December 2024
Rev. Richard Coles	Broadcaster, musician & Church of England priest	Third place on 8 December 2024
Oti Mabuse	Professional dancer & Dancing on Ice judge	Eliminated 9th on 7 December 2024
GK Barry	Social media personality	Eliminated 8th on 6 December 2024
Alan Halsall	Coronation Street actor	Eliminated 7th on 6 December 2024
Maura Higgins	Television personality & model	Eliminated 6th on 5 December 2024
Barry McGuigan	Former professional boxer & promoter	Eliminated 5th on 5 December 2024
Melvin Odoom	Television & radio presenter	Eliminated 4th on 3 December 2024
Tulisa	N-Dubz singer & former X Factor judge	Eliminated 3rd on 2 December 2024
Dean McCullough	BBC Radio 1 presenter	Eliminated 2nd on 1 December 2024
Jane Moore	Journalist & Loose Women panellist	Eliminated 1st on 29 November 2024

== Results and elimination ==
Indicates that the celebrity was immune from the vote.
Indicates that the celebrity received the most votes from the public.
Indicates that the celebrity received the second most votes from the public, and was the runner-up.
Indicates that the celebrity received the fewest votes and was eliminated immediately (no bottom two).
Indicates that the celebrity was named as being in the bottom two.

Daily results per celebrity
Celebrity	Day 13	Day 15	Day 16	Day 17	Day 19	Day 20	Day 21	Day 22		Number of trials	Deals on Wheels challenges
Celebrity	Day 13	Day 15	Day 16	Day 17	Day 19	Day 20	Day 21	Round 1	Round 2	Number of trials	Deals on Wheels challenges
Danny	Safe	Safe	Safe	Safe	Safe	Safe	Safe	1st 41.36%	Winner; 55.21%	8	1
Coleen	Safe	Safe	Safe	Safe	Safe	Safe	Safe	2nd 33.47%	Runner-up; 44.79%	8	0
Rev. Richard	Safe	Safe	Safe	Safe	Safe	Safe	Safe	3rd 25.18%	Eliminated (Day 22)	8	1
Oti	Safe	Safe	Bottom two	Safe	Immune	Immune	4th	Eliminated (Day 21)		5	3
GK Barry	Safe	Safe	Safe	Safe	Safe	5th	Eliminated (Day 20)			4	1
Alan	Safe	Safe	Safe	Safe	Safe	6th	Eliminated (Day 20)			4	0
Maura	Safe	Safe	Safe	Bottom two	7th	Eliminated (Day 19)				4	1
Barry	Safe	Bottom two	Safe	Safe	8th	Eliminated (Day 19)				4	0
Melvin	Safe	Safe	Safe	9th	Eliminated (Day 17)					1	2
Tulisa	Safe	Safe	10th	Eliminated (Day 16)						2	1
Dean	Bottom two	11th	Eliminated (Day 15)							7	0
Jane	12th	Eliminated (Day 13)								1	0
Notes	None				1		None	2			
Bottom two (named in)	Dean, Jane	Barry, Dean	Oti, Tulisa	Maura, Melvin	Barry, Maura	Alan, GK Barry	None				
Eliminated	Jane; Fewest votes to save	Dean; Fewest votes to save	Tulisa; Fewest votes to save	Melvin; Fewest votes to save	Barry; Fewest votes to save	Alan; Fewest votes to save	Oti; Fewest votes to save	Rev. Richard; 25.18% (out of 3) to win	Coleen; 44.79% (out of 2)		
Eliminated	Jane; Fewest votes to save	Dean; Fewest votes to save	Tulisa; Fewest votes to save	Melvin; Fewest votes to save	Maura; Fewest votes to save	GK Barry; Fewest votes to save	Oti; Fewest votes to save	Rev. Richard; 25.18% (out of 3) to win	Danny; 55.21% to win		

=== Notes ===
- ^Note 1: Oti was immune from the public vote on Day 19 and Day 20, as a result of winning the ticket to Celebrity Cyclone.
- ^Note 2: The public voted for who they wanted to win, rather than save.

== Bushtucker trials ==
The contestants take part in daily trials to earn food. These trials aim to test both physical and mental abilities. The winner is usually determined by the number of stars collected during the trial, with each star representing a meal earned by the winning contestant for their fellow campmates.

The public voted for who they wanted to face the trial
The contestants decided who would face the trial
The trial was compulsory and neither the public nor celebrities decided who took part

Trial number	Air date	Name of trial	Celebrity participation	Winner/ Win or Loss/ Number of stars	Notes
1	17 November	Mausoleum of Misery	Barry; Danny	5/10 stars	1
2	18 November	Vile Volcano	GK Barry	9/10 stars	N/A
3	19 November	Sinister Sarcophagus	Dean	2/10 stars	N/A
4	20 November	Drown in the Dumps	Dean; GK Barry	0/10 stars	N/A
5	21 November	Lethal Lab	Dean	4/10 stars	N/A
6	22 November	High Street of Horrors	Dean; Danny	8/10 stars	N/A
7	23 November	Terrifying Teddy Bears' Picnic	Maura; Rev. Richard	12/12 stars	2
8	24 November	Absolute Carnage	Coleen; Dean	9/12 stars	N/A
9	25 November	Jack and the Screamstalk	Dean	10/12 stars	3
10	26 November	Fright at the End of the Tunnel	Jane; Maura	6/12 stars	N/A
11	27 November	Shock Around the Clock	Tulisa	5/12 stars	N/A
12	28 November	Rank Bank	Alan; Danny; Dean	Alan $1,100	4
13	29 November	Tanks of Torture	Melvin; Oti	12/12 stars	N/A
14	30 November	Jungle TV Dinners	Rev. Richard; Tulisa	11/11 stars	N/A
15	1 December	Spiralling Out of Control	Barry	10/11 stars	N/A
16	2 December	Farmyard of Fear	Alan; Coleen	10/10 stars	N/A
17	3 December	Sinister Sarcophagus: The Mummy Returns	Oti	8/9 stars	N/A
18	4 December	Arcade of Agony: Grim Grabbers	Coleen; Danny; GK Barry; Rev. Richard	Coleen; Danny	5
19	4 December	Arcade of Agony: Grimball	Alan; Barry; Maura; Oti	Maura; Oti	5
20	5 December	Arcade of Agony: Battle Blocks	Coleen; Danny; Maura; Oti	Oti	5
21	5 December	Arcade of Agony: Face Invaders	Alan; Barry; GK Barry; Rev. Richard	7/8 stars	5
22	6 December	Dreaded Dregs	Coleen; Rev. Richard	6/6 stars	N/A
23	7 December	Celebrity Cyclone	Coleen; Danny; Oti; Rev. Richard	4/4 stars	N/A
24	8 December	Towers of Terror: Part 1	Coleen; Danny; Rev. Richard	6/6 stars	6
25	8 December	Towers of Terror: Part 2	Coleen; Danny; Rev. Richard	6/6 stars	6

=== Notes ===
- ^Note 1: Celebrities competed in pairs in a race to determine who would become the first leaders of camp. Danny, Dean, Jane, Oti and Tulisa had to drink a cocktail which decided the order they would parachute into camp to choose their partner. The pairs were chosen as follows; Danny & Barry, Tulisa & Alan, Jane & GK Barry, Dean & Coleen, and Oti & Melvin. Tulisa & Alan won the race and became the first leaders of the camp, making them exempt from the first bushtucker trial. They also had to choose who would face the first bushtucker trial of the series, ultimately picking Barry and Danny.
- ^Note 2: Instead of competing to win meals for camp, Maura and Rev. Richard were instead playing to win portions of food for the Junk Food Buffet.
- ^Note 3: Rev. Richard and Tulisa were excluded from this trial on medical grounds.
- ^Note 4: Prior to taking part in the trial, Alan, Danny and Dean were told that they would be competing against each other and were appointed captains of the Blue, Orange and Pink teams respectively. Instead of collecting stars to win meals for camp, they would be instead competing to win money for their "cash cards", for which they had to use to pay for necessities within camp, and could also be used to spend on treats. The remaining campmates joined them at the trial and each chose a coloured cash card at random. Coleen and Jane were on the Pink team, Barry and Tulisa were on the Blue team, whilst GK Barry and Oti were on the Orange team. At the end of the trial, Alan won $1,100 for the Blue team, whilst Danny and Dean both earned $500 each for their respective teams. Alan, Danny and Dean were later given the option to use their cash cards to purchase up to 12 stars at $100 each for meals for camp. Alan purchased four stars, whilst Danny and Dean purchased two stars each. Celebrities therefore received eight meals for camp.
- ^Note 5: The campmates were told they would be competing in the Arcade of Agony in three separate trials to win a ticket to Celebrity Cyclone, therefore granting them immunity from the next two public votes. Half of the celebrities competed in the first trial, whilst the other half competed in the second trial. The celebrities had to compete to win tickets, with the two campmates from each trial who accumulated the most tickets advancing to the final trial. Each celebrity also had the opportunity to win a star representing a meal for camp. Coleen, Danny, GK Barry and Rev. Richard competed in the first trial, with Coleen and Danny advancing, as well as winning a meal for camp each. Alan, Barry, Maura and Oti competed in the second trial, with all of them except Maura winning a meal for camp. Maura and Oti claimed the most tickets and advanced to the final trial, which was won by the latter who ultimately received two days of immunity and the ticket to Celebrity Cyclone. Alan, Barry, GK Barry and Rev. Richard subsequently took part in a further trial to win meals for camp that evening.
- ^Note 6: In a change to the format for this series, instead of the final three celebrities competing in individual trials to win starters, mains, desserts and drinks for their final feast, Coleen, Danny and Rev. Richard competed in two final trials together. The first trial was an opportunity to win their starters and main courses, whilst the second trial was to win their desserts and drinks.

== Star count ==
This table represents the number of stars each individual celebrity collected, rather than as a pair or group.

Celebrity	Number of stars earned	Percentage
Danny Jones	30/32 stars	94%
Coleen Rooney	42/45 stars	93%
Rev. Richard Coles	46/48 stars	96%
Oti Mabuse	25/26 stars	96%
GK Barry	11/22 stars	50%
Alan Halsall	13/13 stars	100%
Maura Higgins	18/25 stars	72%
Barry McGuigan	12/19 stars	63%
Melvin Odoom	12/12 stars	100%
Tulisa	16/23 stars	70%
Dean McCullough	33/64 stars	52%
Jane Moore	6/12 stars	50%

== Deals on Wheels challenges ==
As well as competing in the Bushtucker trials, celebrities have to complete in "Deals on Wheels" challenges in order to earn treats for the camp. Two or more celebrities are chosen to compete in each challenge. These are often mental challenges, rather than challenges including critters. They must complete the challenge they have been given in order to win 'Dingo Dollars'.

After completion of the challenge, the celebrities will take the Dingo Dollars and purchase a snack from Kiosk Kev, who is located in an ice cream van, "Kev's Wallaby Whips". Before they are allowed to take the prize, the other celebrities back at the living quarters must answer a trivia question. If they get the question right, they will earn the treat, but if they get it wrong, the celebrities will go back empty-handed.

The celebrities got the question correct
The celebrities got the question wrong
No question was asked

Episode	Air date	Celebrities	Prize	Notes
2	18 November	Melvin; Oti	Marshmallows	—N/a
8	24 November	GK Barry; Oti	Boiled Sweets	—N/a
9	25 November	Melvin; Tulisa	Pringles	—N/a
16	2 December	Danny; Maura; Oti; Rev. Richard	Strawberry Pencils	—N/a

== Camp Leaders ==
Celebrity		Original Run		No. of days
	Leaders	First day	Last day	No. of days
1	Alan Tulisa	1	8	8
2	Barry Danny	8	14	7
3	Oti Rev. Richard	14	21	7

== Ratings ==
Official ratings are taken from BARB, utilising the four-screen dashboard which includes viewers who watched the programme on laptops, smartphones and tablets within 7 days of the original broadcast.

Episode	Air date	Official rating (millions incl. HD & +1)	Weekly rank for all UK TV channels
1	17 November	10.07	1
2	18 November	9.54	1
3	19 November	9.01	4
4	20 November	8.97	5
5	21 November	8.86	7
6	22 November	8.91	6
7	23 November	8.70	8
8	24 November	9.04	3
9	25 November	8.53	4
10	26 November	8.25	6
11	27 November	8.49	5
12	28 November	8.53	3
13	29 November	8.54	2
14	30 November	8.08	7
15	1 December	8.04	9
16	2 December	8.17	5
17	3 December	8.36	4
18	4 December	8.07	6
19	5 December	7.92	8
20	6 December	7.77	9
21	7 December	8.48	3
22	8 December	8.85	1
Series average	2024	8.60	—N/a
Coming Out	13 December	5.97	2
