= Zoe Strimpel =

British journalist (born 1982)

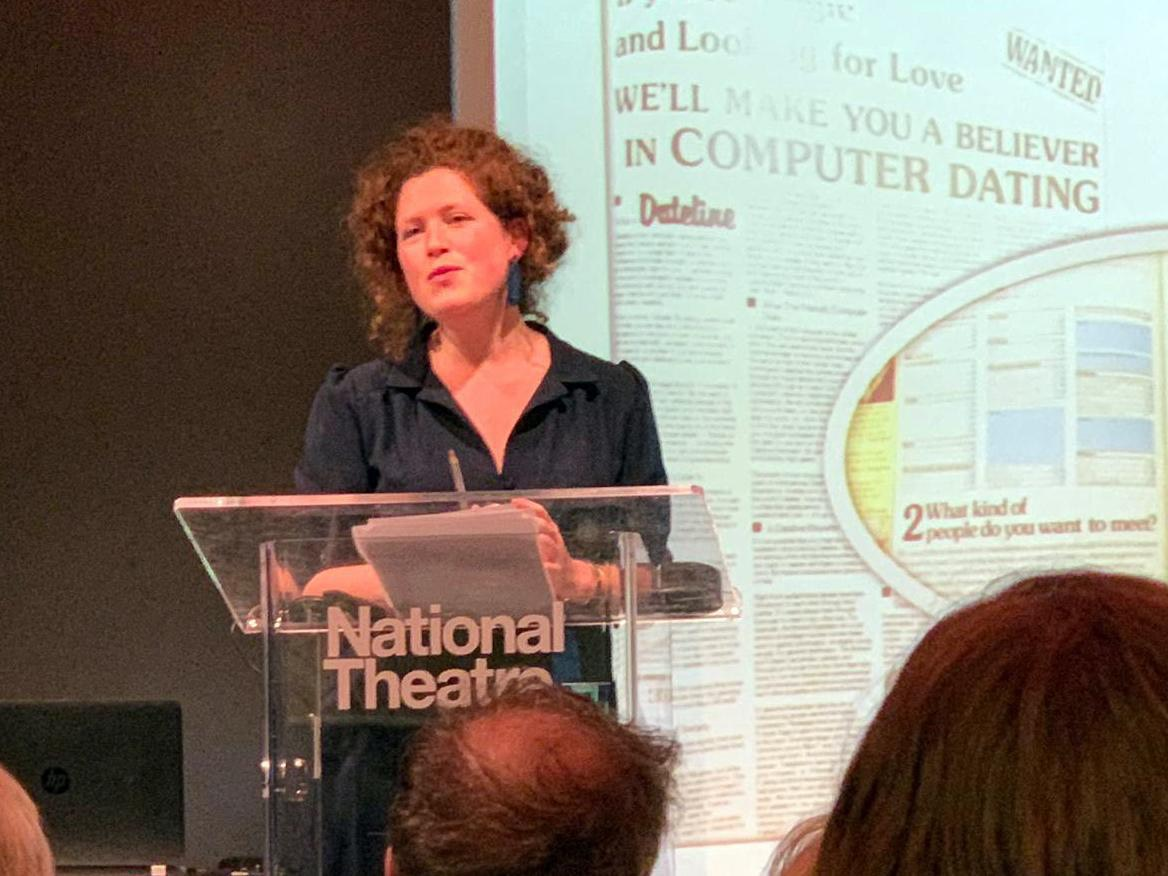
- Born: Zoe Strimpel; 8 July 1982 (age 44); London, England
- Education: Jesus College, Cambridge; Wolfson College, Cambridge; University of Sussex
- Occupations: Journalist, academic (Gender Studies)
- Years active: 2010-present

Zoe Strimpel (born 8 July 1982) is an American British columnist and commentator. Strimpel writes a weekly opinion column for The Sunday Telegraph.

== Early life and education ==
Strimpel was born into a Jewish family in London in 1982 and has a brother. She grew up in Boston, United States, returning to England aged 16. She attended Bedales School, read English at Jesus College, Cambridge, and attended Wolfson College, Cambridge, completing an MPhil in Gender Studies. She then undertook a PhD in Modern British History at the University of Sussex, funded by an Asa Briggs scholarship, before becoming a research fellow for two years on a Leverhulme Trust-funded project at Sussex, Cambridge and the British Library on the business practices of feminist publishers in the 1970s.

In November 2020, Strimpel became a British Academy postdoctoral fellow at the University of Warwick, researching relational tumult following the Divorce Reform Act 1969.

== Career ==
From 2008, Strimpel was a features and lifestyle writer for City AM. She has written on gender relations for Elle, the Sunday Times Style magazine, and HuffPost. She has also contributed to The Jewish Chronicle and writes for The Spectator and UnHerd. She writes a weekly opinion column for The Sunday Telegraph, covering gender, dating, identity, and topical events.

Strimpel has appeared on radio and television to discuss topics such as dating, feminism, and diversity. She presented a podcast on culture called Hyped! with the historian Tom Stammers from 2020 to 2024 and has written several books. She has declared that she is a "pretty major fan of Israel" and wants "Israel’s case to be disseminated to the world".

== Personal life ==
Strimpel lives in a Jewish neighbourhood of north London. She had a daughter in 2024. She is a US citizen.

== Bibliography ==
- What the Hell Is He Thinking? (Penguin, 2010)
- The Man Diet (Avon, 2011)
- Seeking Love in Modern Britain (Bloomsbury, 2020)
- In Defence of Female Promiscuity (Constable, 2026)
- Good Slut (Constable, 2026)
