= Lily Phillips =

English pornographic film actress (born 2001)

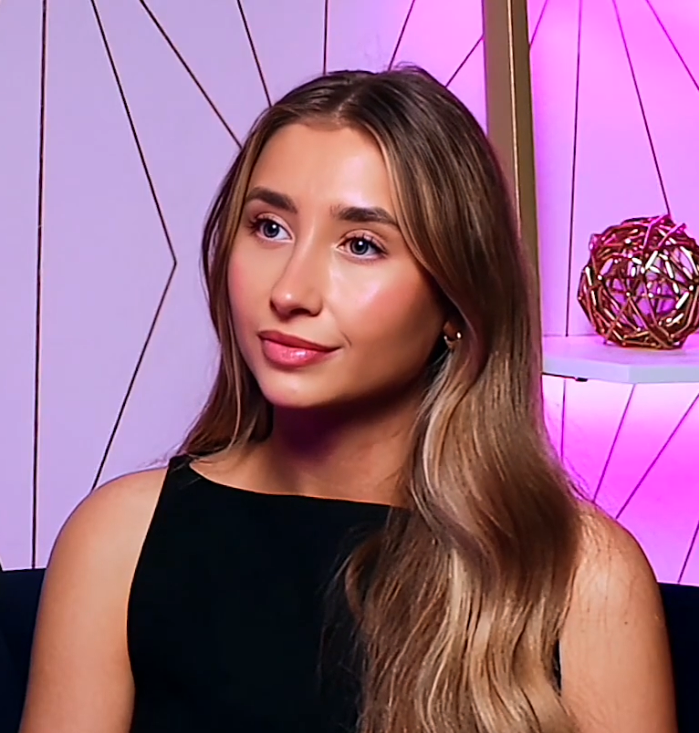
- Phillips in 2025
- Born: Lillian Daisy Phillips; 23 July 2001 (age 25); Derbyshire, England
- Occupation: Pornographic film actress
- Years active: 2021–present

Lillian Daisy Phillips (born 23 July 2001) is an English pornographic film actress. In late 2024, she uploaded a video to OnlyFans in which she had sex with 101 men, which attracted widespread attention after YouTuber Josh Pieters chronicled the events in a documentary titled I Slept with 100 Men in One Day. Although the documentary itself was praised, Phillips and OnlyFans were heavily criticised for the stunt. Phillips defended both her occupation and the event. She later announced plans to have sex with 300 and then 1,000 men in one day. Phillips has filmed content with fellow OnlyFans creator Bonnie Blue.

== Early life ==
Phillips was born in Derbyshire, England, on 23 July 2001. Her parents owned a successful cleaning company. After studying nutrition at university, she developed a presence on Instagram, where her content became progressively more explicitly sexual. After realising she was giving away sex for free at university, she began filming and posting explicitly pornographic videos. After finding that both sexual images and sex were not drawing sufficient income to her OnlyFans account, she mounted a competition in which the winner got to have sex with her, and began filming custom videos and taking fans' phone calls.

== I Slept with 100 Men in One Day ==
External videos
- I Slept With 100 Men in One Day | Documentary

=== Preparation ===
In October 2024, Phillips posted a video calling for participants in an event in which she would attempt to have sex with 101 men. She told the BBC's Newsnight that she had "done 37 guys a month before". For the video, Phillips recruited men by offering sex to any man who completed an application form and took an STI test, with 200 booked. One man gave Phillips a rose before taking part, which remained on the bed unwrapped for the remainder of the event. Filmed in an Airbnb in London, the challenge was carried out haphazardly, with Phillips and her nine employees overwhelmed, and Phillips did not eat lunch. Present throughout was Josh Pieters, a South African-born content creator who had previously gone viral for political pranks. On 5 November, she stated that she planned to become the first woman to have sex with 1,000 men in a day and that she intended to have sex with 300 men on 15 December.

On 7 December, Pieters published to his YouTube channel I Slept with 100 Men in One Day, a 47-minute documentary of the project, and his first. In the documentary, Phillips stated that pornography was empowering on the grounds that men would sexualise her either way. 100 Men featured a scene in which Phillips did not appear to know that HIV could be transmitted orally, a scene in which the cameraman retched after attempting to film a room full of used condoms, and ended with a tearful Phillips stating that she had dissociated thirty men in. The men who had sex with her were not named in the video, although some were interviewed; one flew in from Switzerland and had no regrets, while another expressed concern that his father would find out. The documentary depicted participants dropping out and her team inviting people to bring untested replacements.

Shortly after release, the video went viral; by 19 December, the video and posts discussing it on Twitter and TikTok had received several million views, with one tweet, which featured Phillips crying, receiving 200,000,000 views. The reaction to Phillips's stunt was described as that of "concern, derision, and curiosity" by Charley Ross of Grazia, who also commented that much of the backlash was directed at Phillips rather than the men who had sex with her. As a result, some argued that she was a victim of the patriarchy, while others argued that she was insufficiently reflecting the dangers of the industry and some called for OnlyFans to be shut down. Others suggested that Phillips's stunt was an effort to compete within a hypercompetitive industry, and some suggested that her 1,000-men stunt would beat a world record of 919 set by Lisa Sparxxx in 2004, although Sparxxx stated that the event had involved 150 men and Helen Lewis of The Atlantic suggested that pornographic film actress Houston held the record after having sex 620 times (The World's Biggest Gang Bang III – The Houston 620) in 1999.

=== Reception ===
The video came in for criticism from American conservative pundit Ben Shapiro, who wrote that Phillips had "made herself into a sex robot" whose soul was stained. Media personality Russell Brand expressed empathy towards Phillips and described the stunt as an attempt to "defibrillate divinity down here on the lower levels". British columnist Tanya Gold said Phillips was "not very bright and will soon not be very well". Sarah Fletcher, writing for The Critic, described Phillips as a "Rorschach test for contemporary sexual culture". Kelly Given of The National questioned why Phillips was being "burnt alive at the stake", while Jackie Jennings of Jezebel blamed content creation more generally.

Reviewing the documentary for Rolling Stone, sex worker Jessie Sage praised the documentary for "the attention Pieters gives to the work that goes on behind the scenes of any sexual transaction and the respect shown to Phillips as a successful businesswoman." Sage, as well as Jennings, opined that Phillips' shoot suffered from numerous safety deficiencies, with Jennings singling out lack of security guards and background checks and a "cavalier" attitude toward sexually transmitted infections and Sage writing that this showed Phillips' "youth and inexperience". Lewis connected 100 Men, and internet pornography more broadly, with the logical endpoint of liberal feminism and liberalism and deregulation, and wrote that "as a pure artifact of internet culture and social mores in 2024, I Slept with 100 Men in One Day is hard to surpass." She also praised Pieters' demeanour throughout the film, writing that he appeared "to be the only person on-screen who cares about Phillips' happiness rather than fulfilling their own fantasy or enabling her career".

In a December 2024 interview, Phillips attributed her tears to men shaming her for not allowing them to orgasm, even though none of them had made her do so, and expressed regret for not resting between sex and fielding questions. She also stated that for her thousand-man challenge, then scheduled for February 2025, she would be instituting rapid HIV testing and allowing men to penetrate her once only, and that those attributing her stunt to the industry's oversaturation ignored the success some creators have with much less explicit content. In addition, she argued that telling people how to use their bodies was what feminism sought to get away from and encouraged those direct messaging her expressing concern to redirect their energy into supporting "someone who was an actual victim".

In December 2024, journalist Helen Lewis wrote that "Phillips's aesthetic is that of the girl next door rather than a cartoonishly inflated adult performer." She explicitly targeted men with her content, and promoted herself on podcasts optimised for the manosphere, such as the Whatever podcast. In 2024, she identified as a feminist, and cited Riley Reid, Kazumi, and Angela White as influences.

== Subsequent career ==
In January 2025, after fellow OnlyFans creator Bonnie Blue claimed to have had sex with over 1,000 men in one day, Phillips offered male fans on her TikTok account the chance to "[go] in the back door" with her. Eli Cugini of Dazed criticised tabloids for their coverage of both stunts, and Joe Price of Complex stated that there seemed to be an "OnlyFans arms race" between Phillips, Blue, and Sophie Rain to see who could go viral most often. Felicity Martin of Glamour, Olivia Petter of The Independent, and television personality Olivia Attwood asked why Blue and Phillips were being shamed but not the men who queued to have sex with them. Eva Wiseman wrote in The Guardian: "While Phillips and Blue's intentions and morals and psychic damage have been frequently interrogated, the men lining up to be the 20th or 60th person to penetrate a stranger for three minutes ... have been granted barely a glancing thought." Phillips later cancelled her plans to have sex with 1,000 men in a day after Blue claimed to have beaten her to it, and stated that she found comparisons with Gisèle Pelicot disrespectful.

By February 2025, Phillips and Blue were regularly commenting about each other in Instagram Stories and podcasts. That month, Phillips announced her first pregnancy, although she later admitted that this was a stunt. She was also interviewed by Brand, who offered her "protection". Both Phillips and Tiffany Wisconsin claimed to have had anal sex with 50 men in one day in March 2025. The following month, Phillips appeared on Newsnight. English columnist Sarah Ditum, who appeared alongside her, wrote that Phillips' choices had been "made within an industry that extracts a good profit from her willingness to take excruciating risks with her body and her psyche" and described Phillips as "the first porn star to become a household name in the user-generated-content age". Victoria Derbyshire, host of Newsnight, later wrote that their conversation had made her "oddly hopeful" for Generation Z.

In May 2025, Christine Emba of The New York Times described 100 Men as "one example of how normalization of pornographic extremes has made even lurid acts de rigueur". The following month, Chloe Combi of The Independent wrote that Phillips had "particularly unsettled the mainstream because she looks and sounds like the girl next door – or, more disturbingly, your daughter or your daughter's friend", while Bethany Mandel of The Spectator wrote of the video that Phillips "look[ed] like the product of trauma". Phillips appeared on an episode of the U&W show Stacey Dooley Sleeps Over in August 2025, a show in which Stacey Dooley spent three days with her; Phillips's parents appeared on the show. In January 2026, ABC News published photos of both Phillips and Blue after being hacked.

== Filmography ==
=== Web ===
Year	Title	Role	Ref.
2024	I Slept with 100 Men in One Day	YouTube documentary	

== Awards ==
Year	Ceremony	Category	Film	Result	Ref.
2025	XMA Award	Favorite Female Creator	—N/a	Won	
2026	XMA Europa Award	Best Sex Scene - Vignette	Insatiable Lily Can't Resist His Massive Cock	Won	
