= Shelagh Fogarty =

English presenter and journalist

- Born: 1966 (age 59–60); Liverpool, England
- Occupations: Radio and television presenter, journalist

Shelagh Fogarty (born 1966) is a British radio presenter, journalist and former television presenter. She presents the afternoon programme on LBC, having previously co-hosted the BBC Radio 5 Live breakfast show with Nicky Campbell.

== Early life ==
Fogarty was born as the youngest of seven children in Anfield, Liverpool, to Irish parents. She attended the Mary Help of Christians R.C. High School, a girls' Catholic grammar school run by the Salesian Sisters of Don Bosco, on Stonebridge Lane in Croxteth. She credited the school with providing her with inspiration for her life. She studied French and Spanish at Durham University, graduating in 1988.

== Career ==
Fogarty initially worked as a BBC trainee at Radio Humberside, Radio Guernsey, Radio Bristol, Radio Sheffield and Radio Merseyside. She co-hosted the Radio Merseyside breakfast show in the early 1990s with Roger Summerskill for around three years, entitled Morning Merseyside. In 1998, she moved to Merseyside Tonight on Radio Merseyside.

=== Five Live ===
She then moved on to Radio 5 Live where she co-presented Weekend Breakfast before moving to co-host the Breakfast programme with Nicky Campbell. In April 2011, Fogarty took over from Gabby Logan on the lunchtime show.

In January 2008, she had a gun pointed at her and her film crew while filming a report for ITV's Tonight with Trevor McDonald, in Croxteth, where she was brought up.

In January 2010, Fogarty joined the presenting team of The Daily Politics, co-hosting the show on Thursdays with Andrew Neil.

In March 2010, she swam a mile in The Serpentine in Hyde Park for Sport Relief 2010.

In July 2014, Fogarty announced that she would be leaving 5 Live to explore other opportunities.

=== LBC ===
Following a period as a guest presenter with LBC, in December 2014, it was announced that Fogarty would join the station to present its 1:00 pm-4:00 pm weekday slot. In May 2022, Fogarty challenged Conservative MP Jonathan Gullis over the political career of Boris Johnson. The exchange was later listed by LBC as one of the "best of 2022".

== Awards ==
Fogarty won the Sony Silver Award in 2007 for the 5 Live Breakfast programme as Best News and Current Affairs Programme with Nicky Campbell.
