= Applied Nutrition =

Nutrition supplements business

Applied Nutrition plc
- Type: Public
- Traded as: LSE: APN
- Industry: Food
- Founded: 2014
- Founder: Tom Ryder
- Headquarters: Knowsley, Merseyside, England
- Key people: Andy Bell, Chair; Tom Ryder, CEO
- Products: Nutrition supplements
- Revenue: ▲£161.6 million (2026)
- Operating income: ▲£40.6 million (2026)
- Net income: ▲£30.6 million (2026)
- Website: www.appliednutritionplc.com

Applied Nutrition plc is a business producing and selling nutrition supplements. It is listed on the London Stock Exchange and is a constituent of the FTSE 250 Index.

== History ==
The company was founded by a former scaffolder for Liverpool City Council, Tom Ryder: he became a fitness specialist and launched the company in a shop in Kirkby in 2014.

Rangers F.C. agreed to buy the company's products for pre-match preparations and post-match recovery in August 2021. Then, in September 2023, Fulham F.C. decided to purchase the company's products for its men's first team, academy, and women's team.

Coleen Rooney, the wife of the footballer, Wayne Rooney, was appointed a brand ambassador for the company in early 2024.

The company was the subject of an initial public offering on the London Stock Exchange in October 2024.

== Operations ==
The company sells four product ranges: Applied Nutrition, All Black Everything (ABE), BodyFuel, and Endurance.
