= St John Bosco Arts College =

Saint John Bosco Arts College

Location
- Storrington Avenue; Liverpool, Merseyside, L11 9DQ; England; 53.451739°N 2.910926°W

Information
- Type: Voluntary aided school
- Motto: Serve the Lord with Gladness
- Religious affiliation: Roman Catholic
- Established: 1983
- Founder: Salesian Sisters of Don Bosco
- Local authority: Liverpool City Council
- Department for Education URN: 104715 Tables
- Ofsted: Reports
- Head teacher: Darren Gidman
- Gender: Girls
- Age: 11 to 19
- Enrolment: 900
- Former name: Mary Help of Christians R.C. High School
- Diocese: Liverpool
- Website: http://www.stjohnboscoartscollege.com/

St John Bosco Arts College is a Roman Catholic comprehensive secondary school for girls in Croxteth, Liverpool.

== Admissions ==
The school caters for girls between Year 7 to Year 11, which after this year, in Year 12 and 13, the school allows boys to enter into the sixth form. The school has a total of 1006 students, counting the sixth-formers, 35% of the girls between Year 7 to Year 11 receive free school meals.

== History ==
=== Grammar school ===
The school was a girls' grammar school, the Mary Help of Christians Convent, from the mid-1960s. The neighbouring boys' grammar school was the De la Salle Grammar School, which is now Dixons Croxteth Academy.

Other girls' Catholic grammar schools in Liverpool were Convent of Mercy Girls High School, Notre Dame High School for Girls and La Sagesse Girls High School. Of the nine grammar schools that survived until the mid-1980s in Liverpool, most were Catholic due to their voluntary-aided status.

=== Comprehensive ===
The school became a catholic comprehensive in 1983. The Salesian Sisters of St John Bosco are also known as the Daughters of Mary Help of Christians. It was known as the St John Bosco High School until September 2004 when it became an Arts College. In March 2013 the college became a National Teaching School.

=== New build ===
In September 2014 a new state of the art school was opened with a new grey and pink school uniform for all students.

== Academic performance ==
The school gets excellent results at GCSE which were above the national average in 2014 with 100% 5 A-C grades at GCSE and 61% including English and Mathematics.

== Notable former pupils ==
=== Mary Help of Christians R.C. High School ===
- Fiona Jones (nee Hamilton) (1957-2007) - Labour MP from 1997 to 2001 for Newark
- Shelagh Fogarty (b. 1966) - radio and television presenter, BBC Radio 5 Live
- Jane McGoldrick - television producer

=== St John Bosco High School ===
- Coleen Rooney (b. 1986) - English television presenter, columnist and celebrity product endorser
- Lauren McQueen (b. 1996) - English Actress
