= Kai Rooney =

English footballer (born 2009)

Personal information
- Full name: Kai Wayne Rooney
- Date of birth: 2 November 2009 (age 16)
- Place of birth: Liverpool, England
- Position: Forward

Team information
- Current team: Manchester United

Youth career
- Years: Team
- 2016: Manchester United
- 2016–2018: Manchester City
- 2018–2019: Bethesda SC
- 2020–: Manchester United

Kai Wayne Rooney (born 2 November 2009) is an English footballer who plays as a forward for Manchester United's youth academy.

== Early life ==
Rooney was born on 2 November 2009 at the Liverpool Women's Hospital to former England international footballer, and Manchester United record goal-scorer, Wayne Rooney, and former television personality Coleen Rooney. He is of Irish descent through both of his parents. Growing up, he supported Premier League side Everton and started playing football at the age of four.

== Club career ==
In October 2016, Rooney enrolled in the Manchester United youth academy, but switched to rivals Manchester City just two months later. Following his father's move to American Major League Soccer side D.C. United in 2018, Rooney joined the Bethesda Soccer Club in Gaithersburg, Maryland.

Following Wayne Rooney's return to English football with Derby County in 2020, Kai Rooney was linked with a return to Manchester City. However, following a trial at rivals Manchester United, he joined the Red Devils in December of the same year, with his father stating that he had offers from other teams, but it was "his decision" to join Manchester United. He integrated into the academy well, breaking Manchester United's record for goals scored in a single season at under-12 level, with 56. The following season, he scored in a 2–0 win against Manchester City in the final of the under-13 National Cup North. English newspaper Daily Mirror wrote in 2026 that he "attracted considerable attention with... [his] displays for United's U18s [during the 2025–26 season]".

== Personal life ==
At the age of twelve, Rooney signed a sponsorship deal with German athletic apparel company Puma.
