= Phil McNulty =

Football Journalist from Great Britain

Phil McNulty is an Irish Liverpool-born sports journalist. He has been BBC Sport's chief football writer since July 2005.

== Early life ==
McNulty attended Roman Catholic secondary school De La Salle Grammar in Liverpool.

== Journalism ==
He covered the FIFA World Cups for the BBC in Japan and South Korea (2002), Germany (2006) and South Africa (2010). He also does sports casting and analysis for BBC Radio on BBC Radio 5 Live, BBC Radio 4 and BBC Radio World Service. McNulty wrote 449 articles from May 2007 to May 2018.

== Recognition ==
In 2012, McNulty was ranked by a Press Gazette poll among Britain's top 50 sports journalists; Andy Stokes commenting that "McNulty is the Proust of the back pages".
