= Coleen Rooney =

English television personality (born 1986)

- Born: Coleen Mary McLoughlin; 3 April 1986 (age 40); Liverpool, Merseyside, England
- Education: St John Bosco Arts College
- Spouse: Wayne Rooney (m. 2008)
- Children: 4

Coleen Mary Rooney (née McLoughlin; born 3 April 1986) is an English media personality. She is married to English football manager and former player Wayne Rooney.

== Early life and education ==
Coleen Mary McLoughlin was born in Liverpool to Tony and Colette McLoughlin. Tony McLoughlin, who was a bricklayer, also ran a boxing club. The McLoughlins are of Irish descent. Coleen is the eldest of four children; her sister Rosie, who had Rett syndrome, died on 5 January 2013 at the age of 14.

Coleen Rooney attended St John Bosco Arts College and left school with 10 GCSEs, including an A* for Performing Arts.

== Career ==
Rooney wrote a column for celebrity magazine Closer entitled "Welcome to My World". She left Closer in 2008 to write a weekly fashion and news column for OK! magazine. Rooney began presenting when in May 2006, she assisted Sir Trevor McDonald on his show Tonight with Trevor McDonald in a programme about the genetic disorder Rett syndrome, from which her younger sister suffered. She went on to make her own series for ITV called Coleen's Real Women in which she was labelled as "the nation's favourite girl next door" and looked for "real women" to front advertising campaigns as an alternative to models.

In December 2005, Rooney sold an exercise DVD entitled Coleen McLoughlin's Brand New Body Workout, which became a bestseller in the United Kingdom. She was paid £3 million to front the George at Asda campaign. In June 2010, Rooney struck a deal with retail and gambling company Littlewoods. Rooney's autobiography, Welcome to My World, was released in March 2007. This was followed by Coleen's Real Style the following year, published by HarperCollins. She has also published a four-book series called Coleen Style Queen from 2008 to 2010.

In October 2023, a drama documentary about the Wagatha Christie court case Vardy v Rooney was released on Disney+, which documented and told Rooney’s side of the case and the details leading up to the social media posting.

Rooney was appointed a brand ambassador for Applied Nutrition, a company making food supplements for footballers and athletes, in early 2024.

In November 2024, Rooney appeared as a contestant on the twenty-fourth series of I'm a Celebrity...Get Me Out of Here!, finishing in second place to Danny Jones after 22 days in the jungle.

== Personal life ==
=== Marriage and children ===
She met her future husband, Wayne Rooney, at age 12 in the Liverpool suburb of Croxteth. They began a relationship when they were 16, after they left secondary school. Wayne's mother Jeanette worked as a part-time cleaner at St John Bosco Arts College, which Coleen attended.

The couple married in Portofino, Italy, on 12 June 2008; Britain's OK! magazine paid them a reported £2.5 million for exclusive wedding information and pictures. The newlyweds, dubbed Wayleen, moved into a new £1.3m mansion in Formby. They lived in Prestbury, Cheshire, in a £4 million neo-Georgian mansion, prior to moving to the United States for Wayne Rooney’s career as player and manager for D.C. United.

The Rooneys have four sons, Kai Rooney (born 2009), Klay (born 2013), Kit (born 2016) and Cass (born 2018).

Rooney is a patron of the Liverpool-based Alder Hey Children's Charity.

=== Rebekah Vardy dispute ===
On 9 October 2019, Rooney made a Twitter post explaining that posts from her private Instagram account were being leaked to The Sun newspaper. She stated that to discover who was selling the stories, she had restricted access to the posts. She revealed that the only viewer of these posts was an account belonging to Rebekah Vardy, implying that she was the culprit. The ensuing scandal was dubbed "Wagatha Christie", a portmanteau of the football term WAG and mystery writer Agatha Christie, by the British media.

Vardy responded on her own Twitter account, denying the claims and claiming that her Instagram account had been hacked. In June 2020, news broke that Vardy was taking Rooney to court for defamation, with legal costs reportedly set to hit £500,000 on each side. In November 2020, Mr Justice Warby ruled in favour of Vardy after the libel preliminary hearing at the High Court in London which took place on 19 November 2020. Neither Rooney nor Vardy were at the court in person. Rooney was ordered to pay Vardy almost £23,000 in court costs. The pair were given until 8 February 2021 to make an attempt to mediate their case. In May 2022, Vardy sued Rooney for libel, arguing that the accusation over her Instagram account was false. Following the earlier ruling, it became Rooney’s responsibility to prove Vardy was personally responsible for leaking stories to The Sun, or convince the judge that publication of the allegation was in the public interest. In July 2022, the judge in the case, Mrs Justice Steyn, dismissed Vardy's claim, ruling that Rooney's accusation was "substantially true".

In October 2023, Disney+ released a three-part documentary series titled Coleen Rooney: The Real Wagatha Story, which explored the legal dispute with Rebekah Vardy and its media coverage.
