= Dixons Croxteth Academy =

Location
- Carr Lane East; Croxteth; Liverpool, Merseyside, L11 4SG; England; 53°26′42″N 2°54′43″W

Information
- Type: Academy
- Established: 1953; 73 years ago
- Local authority: Liverpool City Council
- Trust: Dixons Academy Trust
- Department for Education URN: 149530 Tables
- Ofsted: Reports
- Gender: Co-educational
- Age: 11 to 18
- Website: www.dixonscr.com

Dixons Croxteth Academy (formerly The De La Salle Academy) is a co-educational secondary school in the Croxteth area of Liverpool, England, with no formal faith affiliation.

Until 2022 it was a Catholic school for boys.

== History ==
=== Grammar school ===
It was known as the De La Salle Grammar School until 1983 and was originally based on Breckfield Road South in Everton. The new school site is that of the former Central School, and was rebuilt in 1954. By the 1960s, it had around 700 boys.

=== Comprehensive ===
In 1983, the school became De La Salle RC Comprehensive School. It amalgamated with four other catholic schools in 1988. The school was founded by the De La Salle brothers, who engaged with the day-to-day running of the school.

=== Academy ===
The school gained academy status in January 2011, to become The De La Salle Academy.

In 2021, the school was issued with a warning notice after two inadequate Ofsted reports. Its future was secured following a campaign by staff, students and governors including the local MP Ian Byrne.

=== Under Dixons Academy Trust ===
In November 2022, the school joined the Dixons Academies Trust and was renamed Dixons Croxteth Academy

The school then became co-educational, with no formal faith affiliation.

In 2004, the school gained specialist school status and became the De La Salle Humanities College, specialising in English, Geography and History.

== Notable alumni ==
- Anthony Dunne, NightClub Dj Club Barcelona Juice Fm Chalk & Cheese, was a pupil at the school from 1991 to 1996;
- Adam Farley, former Everton FC player, was a pupil at the school from 1991 to 1996;
- Francis Jeffers, player formerly of Everton, Arsenal and Newcastle United Jets attended the school from 1992 to 1997;
- John McGreal, former Tranmere player, attended from 1983 to 1988;
- Sean Mercer, murderer of Rhys Jones, attended from 2002 to 2008;
- Wayne Rooney, retired footballer renowned for his time at Manchester United, was a pupil at the school from 1997 to 2002;
- Steve Smith is a retired high jumper and Olympic bronze medalist at the 1996 Summer Games, attended from 1984 to 1989;
- James Wallace is currently a Fleetwood Town footballer, was also on Everton's books between 2008 and 2012.

=== De La Salle Grammar School for Boys ===
- Maj-Gen Peter Chambers CB MBE, Deputy Chief of Staff from 1998 to 2002 of the HQ Land Command;
- Air Marshal Sir Christopher Coville CB, Station Commander from 1986 to 1988 of RAF Coningsby, and Commander-in-Chief from 2001 to 2003 of RAF Personnel and Training Command;
- Peter Coyle, singer in The Lotus Eaters
- Terry Fields, Labour MP from 1983 to 1992 for Liverpool Broadgreen;
- Paul Jewell, former Derby County manager and former professional footballer, attended the school from 1976 to 1981;
- Michael 'Mick' Lyons - former Everton player and captain, attended from 1963 to 1968;
- Mark McGann, actor
- Victor McGuire, actor, played Jack Boswell in Bread
- Phil McNulty, chief sports writer at BBC Sport;
- David Morrissey, actor;
- Brian Reade, journalist
