= Croxteth =

Suburb of Liverpool, England

Coordinates: 53.44819°N 2.90757°W

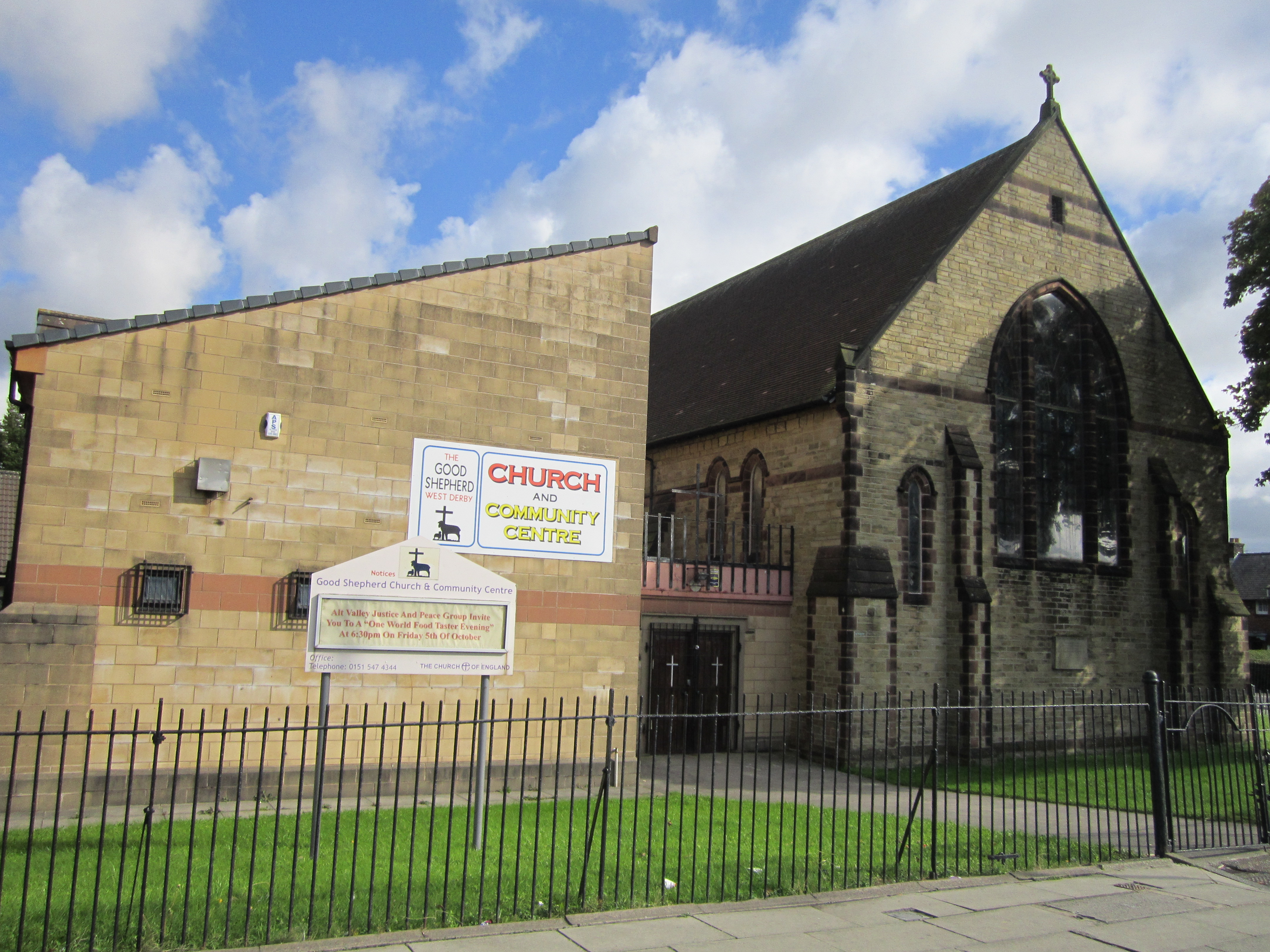
- Church of the Good Shepherd, Croxteth

- Location within Merseyside
- Population: 16,543
- OS grid reference: SJ405961
- Metropolitan borough: Liverpool
- Metropolitan county: Merseyside
- Region: North West
- Country: England
- Sovereign state: United Kingdom
- Post town: LIVERPOOL
- Postcode district: L11
- Dialling code: 0151
- Police: Merseyside
- Fire: Merseyside
- Ambulance: North West
- UK Parliament: Liverpool West Derby

Croxteth is a suburb of Liverpool, Merseyside, England, and a Liverpool City Council Ward. Although housing in the area is predominantly modern, the suburb has some notable history. At the 2011 census it had a population of 14,561. It is also known by the colloquial nickname Crocky.

== Etymology ==
The name Croxteth appears to be of Old Norse origin. The name appears to mean "Croc's landing place" or "river-bend landing place", derived from the elements Croc (personal name) or Old Norse krókr ("river-bend") + Norse stǫð ("landing-place, jetty"). Or else, the second element may be staðr ("place").

== History ==
The suburb is in the north of Liverpool and borders Norris Green, Gilmoss, Fazakerley and West Derby. The "Dog and Gun" public house (demolished in 2005) was a historic hostelry, likely associated with the hunt from Croxteth Hall.

The first tranche of housing in Croxteth was built to rehouse families from the Scotland Road area of the city that was subject to mass demolition during the construction of the second Mersey Tunnel.

From the A580 road (the Liverpool-East Lancashire Road, abbreviated to and known commonly as East Lancs Road) passing Malpas Road to St. Swithens including the much talked about haunting of Gillmoss School. Croxteth was one of the first "suburbs of Liverpool".

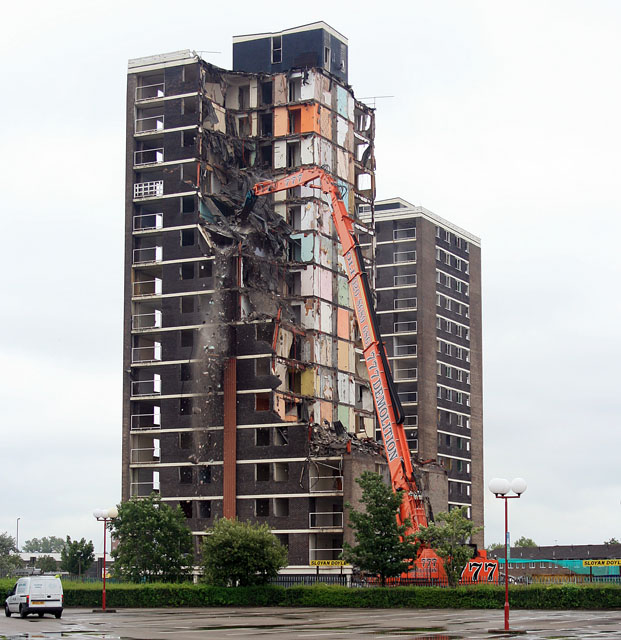
Redevelopment in Croxteth in 2007

The first houses in the Croxteth estate were in fact built in the immediate post war period to house skilled workers from Slough and Rugby who had been brought in to the English Electric and Napier factories (on the East Lancs Road), and families from the dockland inner-city areas who had lost their homes through bombing and slum demolition. The second tunnel came much later. The first families arrived in 1951 to live in an estate that was without roads, pavements, shops, pubs or buses. However, in the wake of World War II during the late 1940s and early 1950s, massive residential extensions at Croxteth, alongside similar and indistinguishable development of neighbouring Norris Green, resulted in what together, are now regarded as the largest municipal housing estate in Europe.

== Transport ==
Croxteth is close to the A580 East Lancashire Road, to the north, and the M57 motorway.

The area is served by the Merseytravel bus routes to Liverpool City Centre, Page Moss, Broadgreen Hospital, Fazakerley Hospital and Knowsley Industrial Estate.

The nearest station is Fazakerley railway station, approximately 3 miles (4.8 km) away in on the Kirkby branch of Merseyrail's Northern Line.

A proposed light rail system, Merseytram was intended to serve Croxteth. Approved in 2002, it would have linked Kirkby and Croxteth to Liverpool City Centre via West Derby, West Derby Road, the Royal Liverpool University Hospital and a city centre loop. The Merseytram Line 1 Transport and Works Act was approved by the then Secretary of State for Transport Alistair Darling in December 2004 and construction of the route was expected to begin with the M-Pact consortium of GrantRail and Laing O’Rourke selected to do so from 2005. However, due to cost overruns and other associated difficulties, the scheme was cancelled in November 2009.

== Education ==
The area is serviced by two secondary schools (11–18); Dixons Croxteth Academy (mixed) and St John Bosco Arts College (Catholic Girls). In 2010, a third school, Croxteth Community Comprehensive (Mixed), closed due to poor academic standards and falling pupils numbers, despite local protests and the school achieving higher academic standards in OFSTED reports and on average higher student grades than De La Salle. In June 2008 it was revealed a new £20m "super-school" would be built on the site of De La Salle. However, this proposal has since been scrapped.

== Notable residents ==
Former England footballer Wayne Rooney and his wife Coleen (née McLoughlin) grew up and met in the area. Coleen was a pupil at St John Bosco School and Wayne attended De La Salle School (now Dixons Croxteth Academy).

One-time England footballer Francis Jeffers also attended De La Salle School.

Distance runner Robert Pope, who became the first person to complete the 15,600-mile Forrest Gump run, was born and raised in the area.
