= Wayne Rooney =

English football player and manager (born 1985)

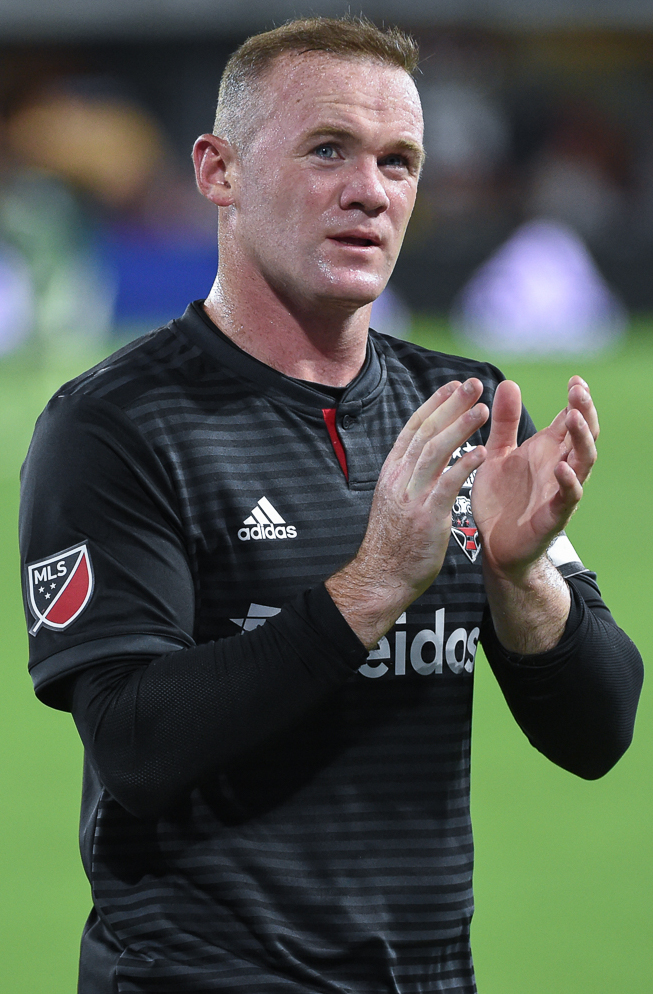
- Rooney with D.C. United in 2018

Personal information
- Full name: Wayne Mark Rooney
- Date of birth: 24 October 1985 (age 41)
- Place of birth: Liverpool, England
- Height: 5 ft 9 in (1.76 m)
- Positions: Forward; midfielder

Youth career
- 1996–2002: Everton

Senior career*
Years	Team	Apps	(Gls)
2002–2004	Everton	67	(15)
2004–2017	Manchester United	393	(183)
2017–2018	Everton	31	(10)
2018–2019	D.C. United	48	(23)
2020–2021	Derby County	30	(6)
Total		569	(237)

International career
2000–2001	England U15	4	(2)
2001–2002	England U17	12	(7)
2002	England U19	1	(0)
2003–2018	England	120	(53)

Managerial career
- 2020–2022: Derby County
- 2022–2023: D.C. United
- 2023–2024: Birmingham City
- 2024: Plymouth Argyle
- * Club domestic league appearances and goals

Wayne Mark Rooney (born 24 October 1985) is an English former professional football player and manager. Widely regarded as one of the best players of his generation and one of the greatest players in Premier League history, Rooney won five league titles and remains the only player to have recorded both 200 goals and 100 assists in the competition. He spent most of his playing career as a forward but was also used in various midfield roles. He is Manchester United's top goalscorer of all time with 253 goals and was the all-time English top goalscorer in the UEFA Champions League (34) from 2011 to 2024. Rooney was named the FIFPRO Young Player of the Year in 2004–05, selected in the ESM Team of the Season for 2009–10, and included in the 2011 FIFA FIFPRO World XI. In 2025, Goal named him one of the best players never to have won the Ballon d'Or; his highest finish was 5th place in 2011.

After emerging as one of England's top young talents at Everton, Rooney later joined Manchester United in 2004 for £25.6 million. He was named the PFA Young Player of the Year in his debut season before being voted the PFA Fans' Player of the Year in 2005–06 at 20 years old. He was a key figure as United won three consecutive Premier League titles from 2006–07 to 2008–09 and reached three Champions League finals in 2008, 2009, and 2011, winning the 2008 title. Rooney also scored the winning goal in the 2008 FIFA Club World Cup final and was awarded the Golden Ball. After having his most prolific season to that point in 2009–10, he won the PFA Players' Player of the Year. Rooney helped United reclaim the Premier League title in 2010–11 and won his fifth and final league title in 2012–13.

In total, Rooney won 16 trophies with United and became one of only two English players, alongside teammate Michael Carrick, to win the Premier League, FA Cup, Champions League, League Cup, UEFA Europa League, and FIFA Club World Cup. He won the BBC Goal of the Season on three occasions, and his February 2011 bicycle kick against city rivals Manchester City won the Premier League 20 Seasons Awards Best Goal award. In 2017, he returned to Everton before departing to Major League Soccer club D.C. United a season later. In 2020, he moved to Derby County. After a season and a half at Derby, he retired in January 2021.

Rooney made his senior international debut for England in February 2003, aged 17, and is England's youngest-ever goalscorer. He played at UEFA Euro 2004 and scored four goals, briefly becoming the youngest goalscorer in the history of the European Championship, and was named in its Team of the Tournament. Rooney later featured at the 2006, 2010 and 2014 World Cups, and was widely regarded as his country's best player. He won the England Player of the Year award four times, in 2008, 2009, 2014, and 2015. With 53 goals in 120 international caps, Rooney is England's third-most-capped player (behind Peter Shilton and Harry Kane), and was the record goalscorer from 2015 to 2023, currently ranking second.

== Early life ==
Wayne Mark Rooney was born on 24 October 1985 in the Croxteth area of Liverpool, Meryseyside, the son of Jeanette Marie (née Morrey) and Thomas Wayne Rooney. He is of Irish descent through his father and is a Catholic Christian. Rooney revealed in the 2026 documentary series The Real Rooneys that he had recently discovered Polish-Jewish ancestry through his maternal grandmother; his mother Jeanette told him his great-grandmother, whose surname is believed to be Greenburg or Greenberg, had fled Poland for Liverpool. The revelation coincided with a family trip to Kraków and Auschwitz, prompted by his son Kit's study of the Second World War at school. Before becoming successful in professional football, he considered becoming a priest.

Rooney has two younger brothers, Graham and John. He and his brothers attended Our Lady and St Swithin's Primary School and De La Salle School. John also later became a footballer. Rooney grew up supporting Everton. He admired Brazilian striker Ronaldo, with Rooney stating that "as an out-and-out forward [Ronaldo] was probably the best".

== Club career ==
=== Everton ===
==== Youth squads ====
Rooney began playing for Liverpool Schoolboys and scored 72 goals in one season, a record which stood until May 2010. At the age of nine, Rooney played for Copplehouse boys' club in the local Walton and Kirkdale junior league and scored 99 goals in his final season before being spotted by Everton scout Bob Pendleton. Rooney joined Everton at age nine, and was the Everton mascot for the Merseyside derby against Liverpool as an 11-year-old. In the 1995–96 season, he scored 114 goals in 29 games for Everton's under-10s and 11s, and by the age of 15, he was playing for the under-19s. He scored eight goals in eight games during Everton's run to the FA Youth Cup Final in 2002. In the final defeat against Aston Villa, he scored one goal and, upon scoring, revealed a T-shirt that read, "Once a Blue, always a Blue." Rooney was included in Everton's first team squad for their training camp in Austria in the summer of 2002 and scored his first senior goal in a 3–1 friendly victory over SC Weiz on 15 July.

==== First team breakthrough ====
"Rooney is the biggest England talent I've seen since I arrived in England. There has certainly not been a player under 20 as good as him since I became a manager here."

— Arsène Wenger on Rooney following his last-minute goal against Arsenal in October 2002.

Rooney was an unused substitute in Everton's 1–0 away win over Southampton on 20 April 2002. He made his senior debut on 17 August in a 2–2 home draw against Tottenham Hotspur, starting the match and assisting the first goal by Mark Pembridge. He became the second-youngest first-team player in Everton history behind Joe Royle. In that match, he was booed by the Tottenham fans who shouted "Who are ya?" whenever he touched the ball. His first senior goals came on 2 October when he scored twice in a 3–0 away win over Wrexham in the second round of the League Cup. These goals meant that Rooney was Everton's youngest-ever goalscorer at the time.

On 19 October, five days before his 17th birthday, Rooney scored a last-minute winning goal against Arsenal. The goal ended Arsenal's 30-match unbeaten run, and also made Rooney the youngest goalscorer in Premier League history, a record that has since been surpassed by James Milner and James Vaughan, and in 2026 by Max Dowman in a match against Moyes's Everton. He scored in a 1–0 away win over Leeds United 15 days later.

In December, Rooney was named 2002's BBC Young Sports Personality of the Year. Six days after claiming the award he scored the winning goal against Blackburn Rovers in a 2–1 home win. His first career red card came on Boxing Day in a 1–1 away draw against Birmingham City for a late challenge on Steve Vickers. In January 2003, Rooney signed his first professional contract, which made him one of world football's highest-paid teenagers. Rooney's first goal of 2003 came on 23 March, netting Everton's only goal in a 2–1 loss at Arsenal. In April, he scored a goal in Everton's 2–1 home win over Newcastle United, before hitting a last-minute winner against Aston Villa in another 2–1 home win. He ended his debut season with eight goals in 37 appearances in all competitions for the Toffees.

Rooney scored his first goal of the 2003–04 season in a 2–2 away draw against Charlton Athletic on 26 August 2003. He did not find the net again until December when he scored in a 2–1 away win over Portsmouth, and a 3–2 home win over Leicester City. His final goal of 2003 came on his 50th league appearance, netting in a 1–0 home win over Birmingham City on 28 December. On 21 February 2004, Rooney scored two goals in a Premier League game for the first time in a 3–3 away draw against Southampton. He scored the sole goal in a 1–0 win over Portsmouth on 13 March, before scoring in a 1–1 away draw against Leicester City one week later. He scored his final goal of the season in a 1–1 away draw against Leeds United on 13 April.

=== Manchester United ===
==== 2004–2007: Adapting to the Red Devils ====
In July 2004, Everton offered Rooney a new five-year contract valued at £50,000 per week, the most lucrative ever offered by the club. Amidst increasing speculation linking Rooney with a transfer, Everton chairman Bill Kenwright admitted the club's financial situation meant a transfer would "revitalise" the club. Everton rejected a bid of £20 million from Newcastle, and Rooney submitted a transfer request on 27 August, with Moyes saying he would not leave unless the club got the right price for him. He ultimately signed for Manchester United at the end of the month after an initial £20 million deal was reached, with an additional £7 million in contingency payments, with Rooney signing a five-year contract. It was the highest fee ever paid for a player under 20 years old; Rooney was still only 18 when he left Everton. Alex Ferguson, then manager of United, said that "There were plenty of eyebrows raised" when he persuaded the club's board of directors to sanction "a multi-million pound" move to try to sign Rooney. In an appearance on United's official podcast in 2020, Rooney revealed Everton had wanted him to sign for Chelsea to ensure a bigger transfer fee, while the mooted transfer to Newcastle would have seen a clause put in place for him to leave after a year to join United.

Rooney can do the lot. Eventually he'll have all the United records.

— United legend Denis Law in September 2004.

Rooney was given the number 8 shirt upon his arrival at Old Trafford. He made his United debut on 28 September in a 6–2 home win over Fenerbahçe in the UEFA Champions League, scoring a hat-trick and laying on an assist. His first season with Manchester United, however, ended without winning a trophy as they could only manage a third-place finish in the league, and failed to progress to the last eight of the Champions League. United had more success in the cup competitions, but were edged out of the League Cup in the semi-finals by a Chelsea side who also won the Premier League title that season. Rooney's second goal in the FA Cup against Middlesbrough on 29 January 2005, a volley hit with the outside of his right foot from the edge of the 18-yard box, was named BBC Goal of the Season. A goalless draw with Arsenal in the FA Cup final was followed by a penalty shoot-out defeat. Rooney was United's top league scorer that season with 11 goals, and was credited with the PFA Young Player of the Year award.

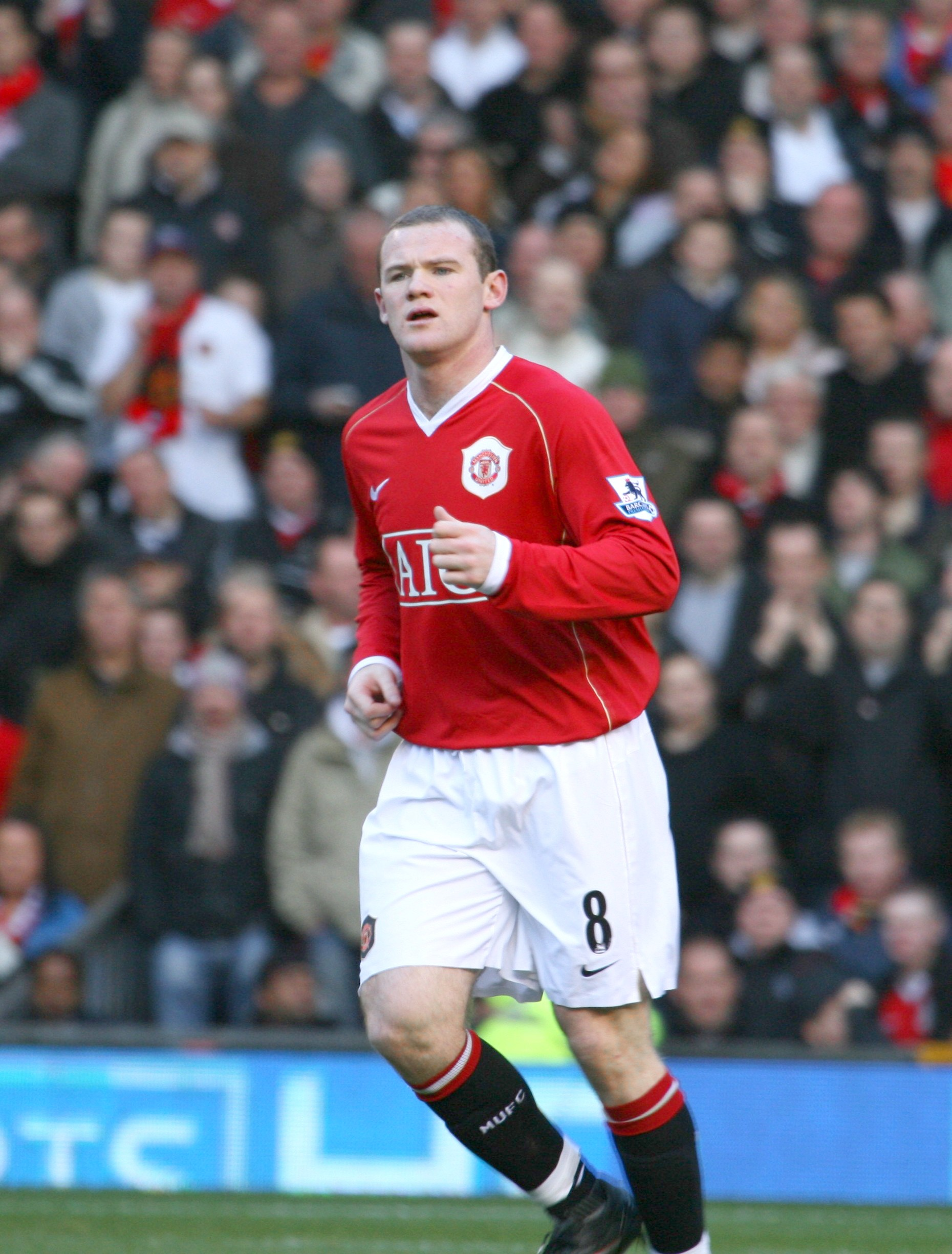
Rooney during Manchester United's 3–1 Premier League win over Manchester City in the derby, in which he scored the game's first goal, December 2006

In September 2005, Rooney was sent off in a goalless Champions League match against Villarreal of Spain for sarcastically clapping the referee, who had booked him for an unintentional foul on an opponent. His first trophy with United came in the 2005–06 League Cup, and he was also named man of the match after scoring twice in the final as United won 4–0 against Wigan Athletic. His club finished the season as Premier League runners up, with their title hopes ended in late April when they lost 3–0 away to champions Chelsea. Rooney sustained a broken metatarsal in that game after a tackle from Paulo Ferreira. Rooney scored a total of 16 goals in 26 Premier League games in the 2005–06 season.

Rooney was sent off in the 2006 Amsterdam Tournament match against Porto on 4 August 2006 after hitting Porto defender Pepe with his elbow. He was punished with a three-match ban by the FA, following their receipt of a 23-page report from referee Ruud Bossen that explained his decision. Rooney threatened to withdraw the FA's permission to use his image if they did not revoke the ban, although the FA had no power to make such a decision.

During the first half of the 2006–07 season, Rooney endured a ten-game scoreless streak before scoring a hat-trick against Bolton Wanderers. He subsequently signed a two-year contract extension the following month that tied him to United until 2012. In April 2007, Rooney scored and provided an assist for Chris Eagles in a crucial 4–2 league win for Manchester United at his former club Everton, a game that also became notable for Rooney's response to fans that once cheered him.

'Once a Blue, always a Blue'. Wayne Rooney's infamous t-shirt was supposed to declare his love for Everton but later fuelled the feeling of betrayal felt by some Everton supporters after his transfer to Manchester United. The boos rang out as loud as ever when Rooney and co. took on Everton at Goodison Park. On 50 minutes, with Everton 2–0 up, it seemed the home fans would have the last laugh. However, United fought back and levelled before Rooney tapped in at the far post with 11 minutes to go – and promptly kissed the badge of his United shirt.

— Sky Sports on Rooney's goal celebration where he kissed the Manchester United badge when scoring against his boyhood club, April 2007

In the same month, Rooney scored two goals in an 8–3 aggregate Champions League quarter-final win over Roma and two more in the same competition at the end of April, in a 3–2 semi-final first leg victory over AC Milan. Rooney collected his first Premier League title winner's medal at the end of the 2006–07 season. He scored 14 league goals that season.

==== 2007–2010: The number 10 shirt ====
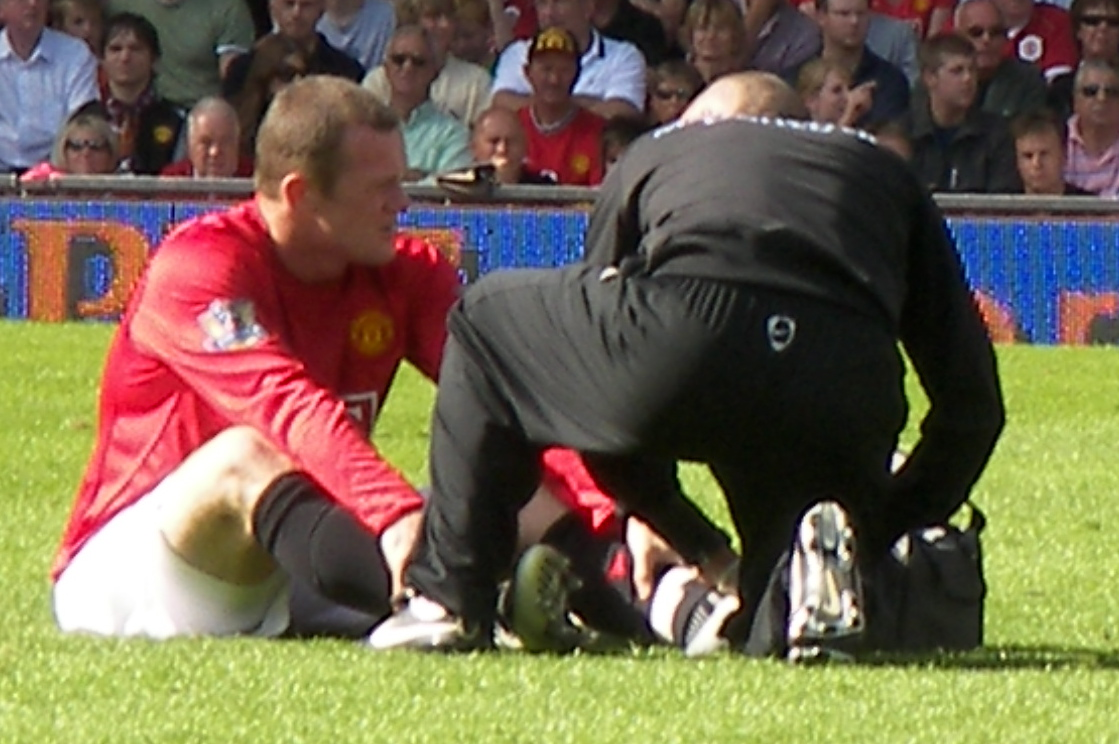
Rooney being treated for a broken foot during a Premier League match against Reading in August 2007

In June 2007, Rooney was given squad number 10, last worn by Ruud van Nistelrooy. Rooney reasoned that he always loved that number. He fractured his left metatarsal in United's opening-day goalless draw against Reading on 12 August, the same injury he had suffered to his right foot in 2004. After being sidelined for six weeks, he returned and scored in United's 1–0 Champions League group stage win over Roma on 2 October. On 23 October 2007, Rooney scored in the 4–2 victory over Dynamo Kyiv in the UEFA Champions League, becoming the first player in the history of the club to score 9 goals in Europe at the age of 21 or below. Rooney was again injured on 9 November, hurting his ankle during a training session and missing an additional two weeks. His next match after injury was against Fulham on 3 December, in which he played 70 minutes. Rooney missed ten games and finished the 2007–08 season with 18 goals (12 of them in the league), as United clinched the Premier League. In the Champions League's first-ever all-English final, United defeated league rivals Chelsea to win another trophy.

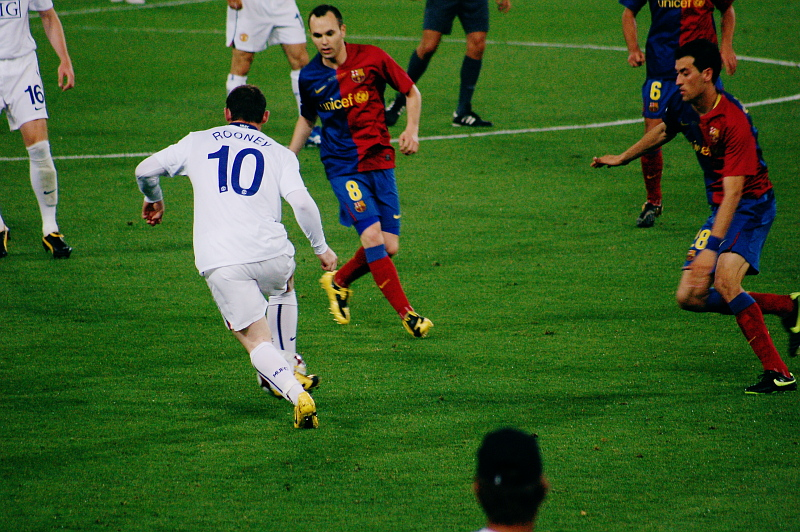
Rooney takes on Andrés Iniesta and Sergio Busquets of Barcelona during the 2009 UEFA Champions League final.

Rooney played in 2008 UEFA Super Cup where United lost to Zenit Saint Petersburg and was unable to make an impact. On 4 October 2008, in an away win over Blackburn, Rooney became the youngest player to make 200 Premier League appearances. On 18 December, Rooney scored twice in the 5–3 semi-final victory over Japanese club Gamba Osaka in the FIFA Club World Cup, and, after scoring the winning goal as United beat LDU Quito 1–0 in the final in Yokohama, was awarded the Golden Ball as the best player in the tournament. On 14 January after scoring 54 seconds into the 1–0 win over Wigan, Rooney limped off with a hamstring injury in the eighth minute. On 25 April 2009, Rooney scored his final league goals of the season against Tottenham; United scored five goals in the second half to come from 2–0 down to win 5–2; Rooney scored two goals, set up two and provided the assist that led to the penalty for United's first goal. On 27 May, Rooney played against Barcelona in the 2009 Champions League Final in Rome, with United losing 2–0. Rooney ended the season with 20 goals in all competitions. Once again, he managed 12 goals in the league.

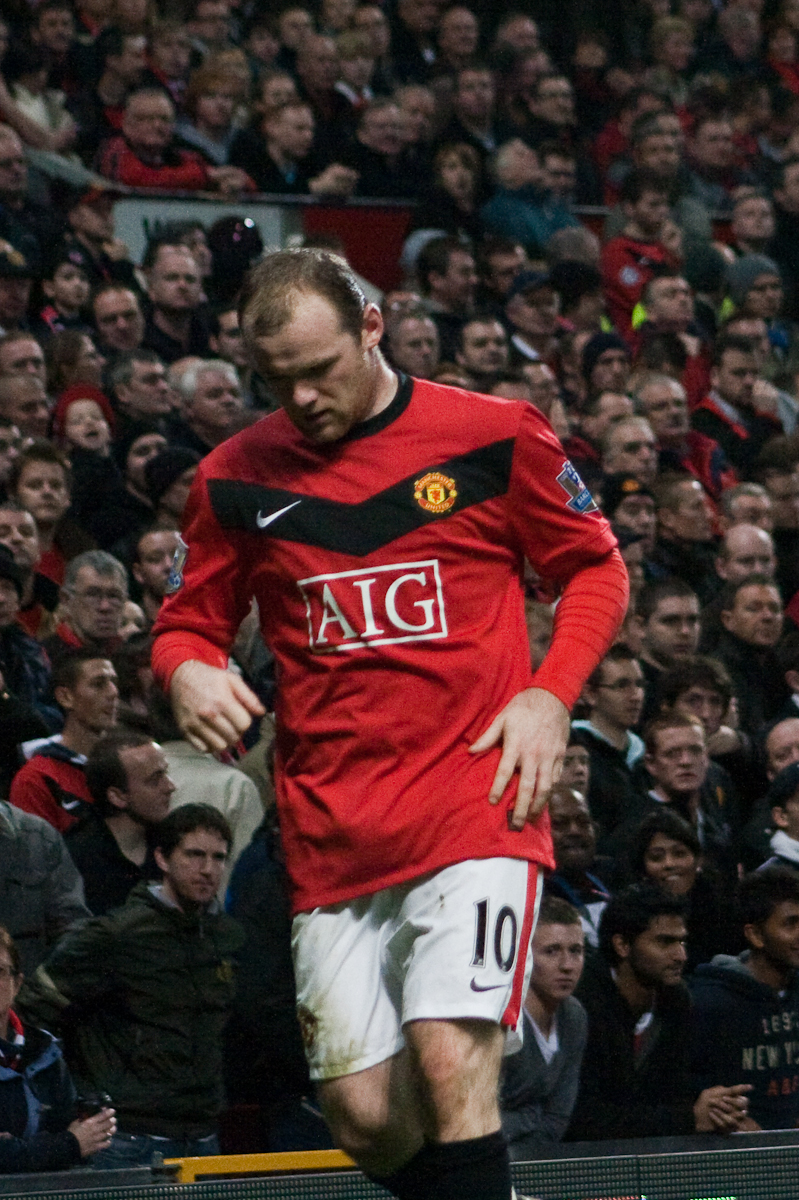
Rooney in a Premier League match against Everton in November 2009

Rooney scored in the 90th minute of the season-opening 2009 Community Shield, although United lost the game to Chelsea on penalties. He then scored the only goal of the first league game of the 2009–10 season against Birmingham City, taking his overall United tally to 99. On 22 August, he became the 20th Manchester United player to score 100 goals for the club, when he found the net twice in a 5–0 away win at Wigan. On 29 August, United played Arsenal at Old Trafford. Rooney scored a goal from the penalty spot to level the game after Andrey Arshavin had put the Gunners ahead. The game finished 2–1 to Manchester United after Abou Diaby scored an own goal. On 28 November 2009, Rooney scored his first hat-trick for three years in a 4–1 away victory against Portsmouth, with two of the goals being penalties. On 27 December 2009, he was awarded Man of the Match against Hull City. He was involved in all the goals scored in the game, hitting the opener and then giving away the ball for Hull's equalising penalty. He then forced Andy Dawson into conceding an own goal and then set up Dimitar Berbatov for United's third goal which gave them a 3–1 victory. On 30 December 2009, Rooney scored another goal as United beat Wigan 5–0 in their final game of the decade.

On 23 January 2010, Rooney scored all four goals in Manchester United's 4–0 win over Hull; three of the goals came in the last ten minutes of the match. This was the first time in his career that he registered four goals in a single match. On 27 January 2010, he continued his scoring run by heading the winner in the second minute of stoppage time against derby rivals Manchester City. This gave United a 4–3 aggregate win, taking them into the final; it was his first League Cup goal since netting two in the 2006 final. On 31 January 2010, Rooney scored his 100th Premier League goal in a 3–1 win over Arsenal for the first time in the league at Emirates Stadium, notably his first Premier League goal also came against Arsenal. On 16 February 2010, Rooney hit his first European goals of the season, scoring two headers in the 3–2 away win against Milan in Manchester United's first ever win against them at the San Siro. On 28 February 2010, he scored another header against Aston Villa (his fifth consecutive headed goal) which resulted in Manchester United winning the League Cup final 2–1. In the second leg of United's European tie against Milan, Rooney scored a brace in a resounding 4–0 home victory, taking his tally of goals that season to 30. He then added two more to his tally five days later at Old Trafford, in a 3–0 league win over Fulham.

On 30 March, during United's Champions League quarter-final first leg defeat against Bayern Munich at the Allianz Arena, Rooney crumpled when he twisted his ankle in the last minute, hobbling off while Bayern were producing the buildup that led to their second goal. There were fears that he had received serious ligament damage or even a broken ankle, but it was announced that the injury was only slight ligament damage, and that he would be out for two to three weeks, missing United's crunch match with Chelsea and the return leg against Bayern the following week. The team list for second leg yielded a massive surprise when Rooney was given a starting place in the United line-up. Despite a 3–0 lead by the 41st minute, Bayern snatched a goal back and United were later forced down to 10 men after Rafael was sent-off. Bayern won the match after netting a second away-goal and Rooney was substituted after re-damaging his ankle. On 25 April, Rooney was named the 2010 PFA Players' Player of the Year.

==== 2010–2011: Ambition dispute ====
On 28 August 2010, Rooney scored his first goal of the season as he netted a penalty in a 3–0 home win over West Ham United. In October, Manchester United manager Alex Ferguson stated at a press conference that Rooney wanted to quit the club. This came after a period of dispute as to the extent of Rooney's ankle injury, where Rooney had refuted Ferguson's claim that the injury was the reason Rooney had been dropped to the bench. Rooney and his representatives released a statement regarding his decision to leave the club, insisting it was not down to money but ambition. Following this statement, Rooney made a dramatic U-turn and agreed a new five-year contract at Manchester United until June 2015.

"It was stunning. Unbelievable. We've had some fantastic goals here but in terms of execution... you'll never see that."

— Alex Ferguson on Rooney's bicycle kick match-winner against Manchester City.

Rooney made his return to the first team as a substitute against Wigan on 20 November. Four days later, he returned to the starting line-up and scored a penalty in a 1–0 away win over Rangers in the Champions League. He missed a penalty in a 1–0 home win over Arsenal on 13 December. His first goal of the season from open play came on 1 January 2011 in a 2–1 away win over West Bromwich Albion. On 1 February, Rooney scored twice and provided an assist for Nemanja Vidić in a 3–1 home win over Aston Villa. On 12 February, Rooney scored an overhead bicycle kick in the 78th minute of the Manchester derby, which proved to be the winning goal in a 2–1 win over Manchester City. After the match, Rooney said it was the best goal of his career, before Alex Ferguson described the strike as the best goal he had ever witnessed at Old Trafford. The acrobatic strike from 10 yards out would win Rooney his third BBC Goal of the Season award, and it was shortlisted for the FIFA Puskás Award for Goal of the Year (ultimately won by Neymar). Two weeks later, he scored the third goal in a 4–0 away win over Wigan, before opening the scoring in a 2–1 away loss to Chelsea on 1 March. Rooney scored the second goal in a 2–0 home win over Arsenal in an FA Cup tie on 12 March.

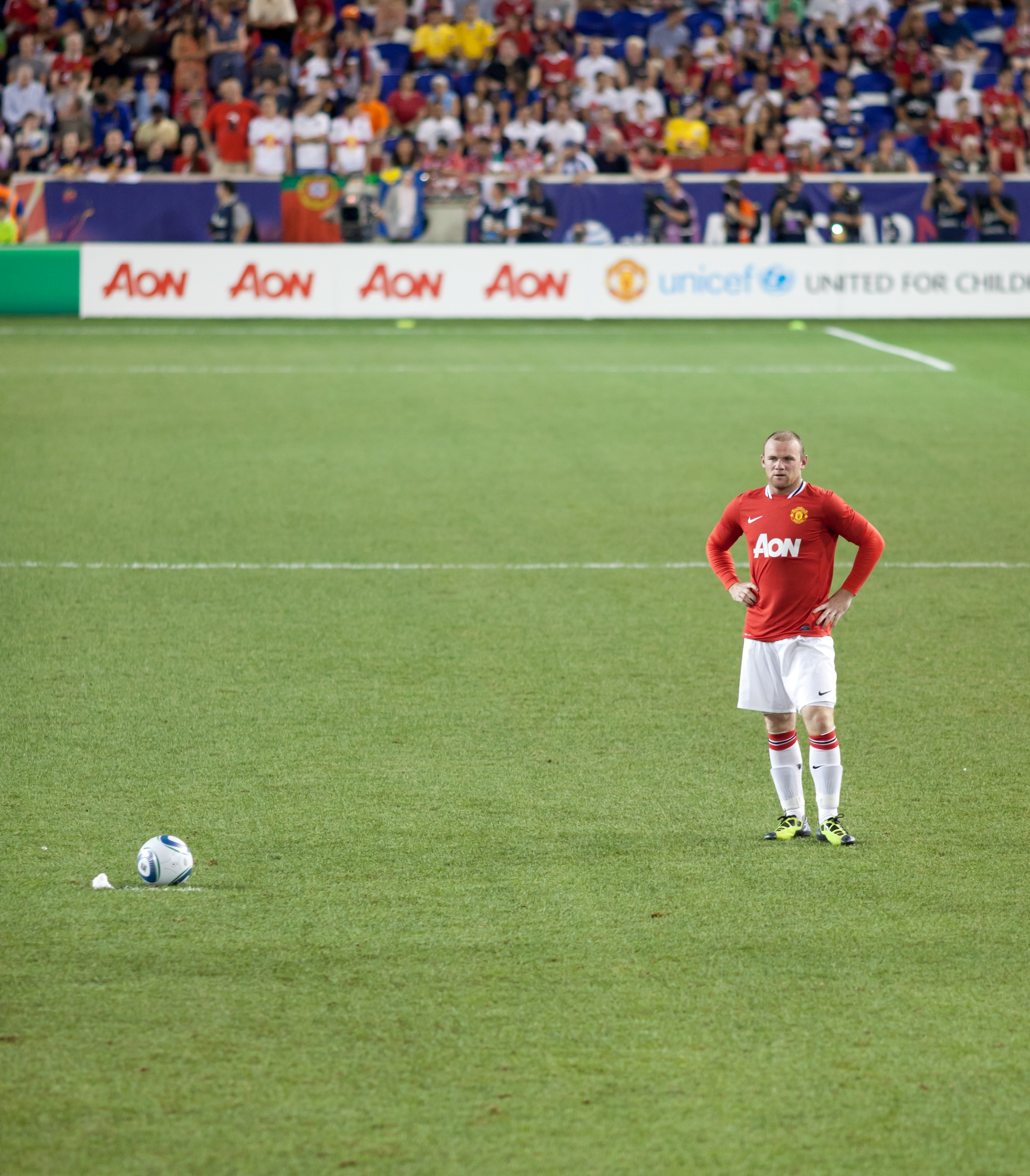
Rooney preparing to take a free kick for Manchester United against the MLS All Stars at the Red Bull Arena in New Jersey, July 2011

On 2 April, United came from two goals down as Rooney scored his first hat-trick of the season in a 4–2 away win over West Ham. This was his fifth hat-trick for Manchester United, whilst the second goal was his 100th in the Premier League for the club. He became the third Manchester United player to score 100 Premier League goals, joining Ryan Giggs and Paul Scholes. During Rooney's celebrations following his third goal, he swore into a pitchside camera and was subsequently charged by the FA for using offensive language. Rooney accepted the charge, but not the automatic two-match ban which was handed to him. He appealed against the length of the suspension, calling it "excessive", but failed to overturn the ban, which ruled him out of the FA Cup semi-final against Manchester City on 16 April. The following game on 6 April saw Rooney score in a 1–0 away win against Chelsea in the Champions League quarter-final first leg. He followed this goal up with another strike in the semi-final first leg against German side Schalke 04 on 26 April, scoring the second of a 2–0 away win. This was the first time Rooney had returned to the Veltins-Arena in Gelsenkirchen since his sending off during the 2006 FIFA World Cup against Portugal.

On 14 May 2011, Rooney scored a penalty for United to equalise in a 1–1 draw against Blackburn at Ewood Park in the penultimate game of the Premier League season – enough to secure a record 19th top division title for United, and giving Rooney his fourth Premier League title winner's medal. On 28 May, in the Champions League final against Barcelona at Wembley, Rooney scored a 34th minute equaliser, but his team lost 3–1.

==== 2011–2013: Divisional success ====
Rooney started the season with a goal in the first league game at The Hawthorns against West Bromwich Albion. Rooney played a one-two with Ashley Young before a sharp turn and finish from outside the box which found the bottom corner of the goal. He also scored in the second game of the season, at home to Tottenham Hotspur, when he headed in a Ryan Giggs cross. In late August, Rooney scored his 150th goal for United, the first of a hat-trick, helping to beat Arsenal 8–2. Rooney won man of the match, scoring two free kicks, a penalty, and also contributing an assist for Nani. On 10 September, Rooney scored another hat-trick in a 5–0 away win over Bolton Wanderers on 10 September, becoming only the fourth player in Premier League history to score a hat-trick in consecutive games. These goals brought him level with Bobby Charlton on seven United hat-tricks, joint fourth on the all-time list behind Denis Law, Jack Rowley and Dennis Viollet. After the fallout from his red card against Montenegro on international duty, Rooney was left out of the starting line-up against Liverpool on 15 October 2011. He returned to action on 18 October 2011, where he scored two goals in the Champions League group stage match against Oțelul Galați and surpassed his former teammate Paul Scholes as the highest-scoring Englishman in Champions League history.

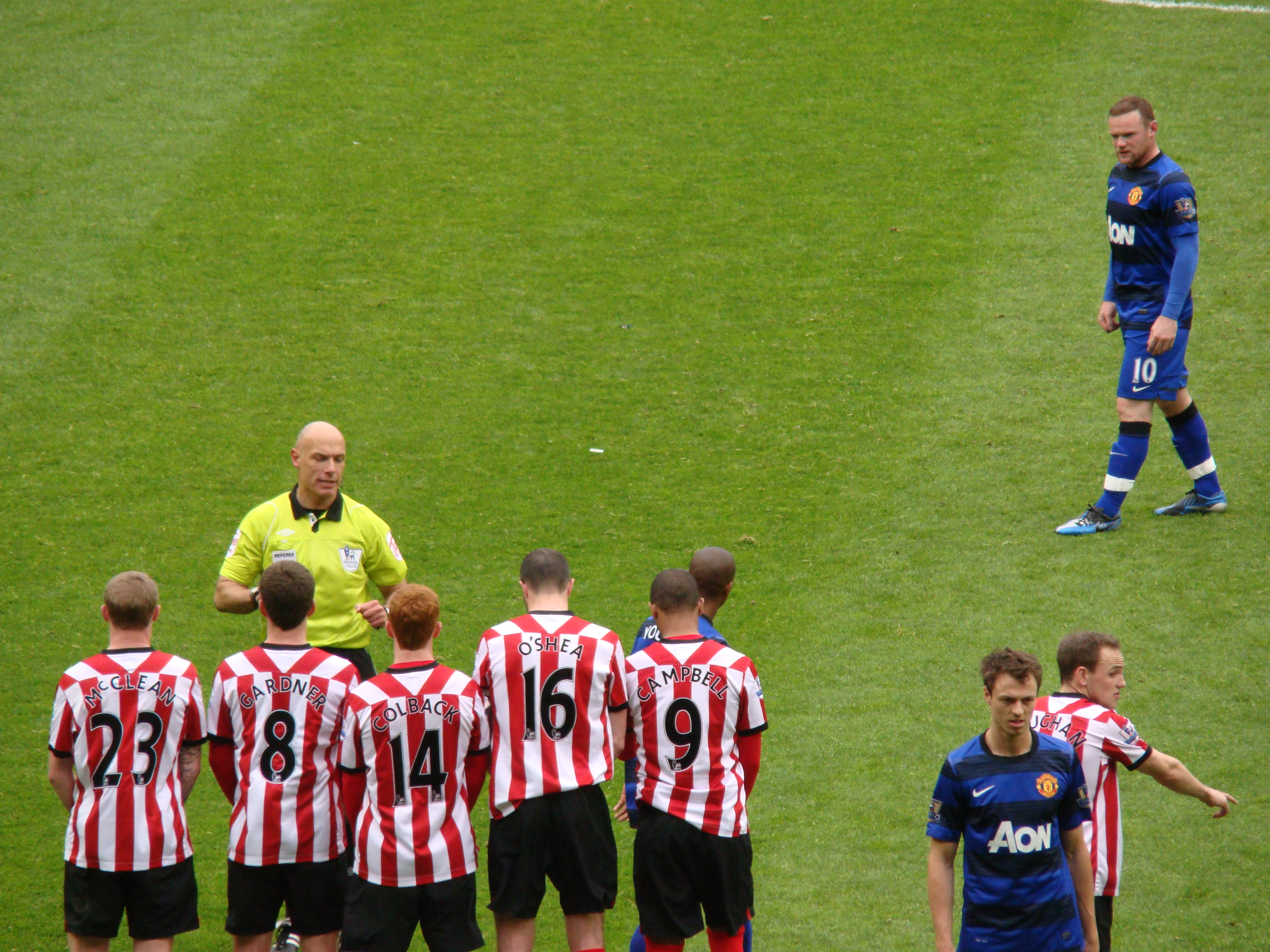
Rooney lines up a free kick against Sunderland on the final day of the 2011–12 Premier League season. Despite Rooney's winner, United lost out on the league title to Sergio Agüero's last minute goal for Manchester City.

On 10 December, Rooney ended an eight-game goal drought with a brace against Wolverhampton Wanderers in a 4–1 win at Old Trafford. On 18 December, Rooney continued his goalscoring form, heading home the opening goal against Queens Park Rangers at Loftus Road; it was Manchester United's quickest of the season so far, as Rooney turned home Antonio Valencia's cross after just 52 seconds. On 21 December, Rooney scored his 130th Premier League goal in his 300th Premier League appearance against Fulham at Craven Cottage with a long-range effort that crashed in off the inside of the post in a 5–0 win.

On 8 January, Rooney scored two goals in the 3–2 win over Manchester City at the City of Manchester Stadium in the FA Cup third round. With these goals, Rooney passed Mark Hughes in United's all-time top goalscorers table, moving up to seventh place overall with 164 goals. On 14 January, Rooney made a big contribution to his team in a 3–0 home win against Bolton. Although he missed a penalty, he did create two goals by assisting Paul Scholes for the first goal and Danny Welbeck for the second. On 5 February, Rooney scored twice from the penalty spot as United came back from a 3–0 deficit to draw 3–3 in a Premier League clash against Chelsea at Stamford Bridge. On 11 February 2012, Rooney marked his 500th senior career game by scoring two goals as Manchester United beat rivals Liverpool 2–1 at Old Trafford. This was also his 350th game for United in all competitions. On 4 March, Rooney scored the first goal in a 3–1 away win against Tottenham at White Hart Lane and passed Joe Spence in Manchester United's all-time top goalscorers table, moving up to sixth place overall with 169 goals. He scored another brace in his next game, against Atletico Bilbao in the UEFA Europa League. On 11 March, Rooney scored the two goals that brought United the victory against West Brom in a 2–0 home win. On 15 March, Rooney scored in the second leg of the Europa League tie against Athletic Bilbao in Bilbao despite United losing 2–1 on the night and 5–3 on aggregate. In the final day of the season, Rooney put United ahead against Sunderland. With United's Premier League title rivals, Manchester City, losing 2–1 in their game going into injury time, Rooney's winner looked like it would seal the title. Despite that, Manchester City scored twice in stoppage time, the clincher being a 94th-minute winner from Sergio Agüero, to take the trophy.

Despite starting the opening game of the 2012–13 season against Everton, Rooney was dropped to the bench for the second game against Fulham in favour of new signing Robin van Persie. After coming on for Shinji Kagawa in the 68th minute, Rooney suffered a severe gash to his right leg caused by Fulham's Hugo Rodallega that kept him out for four weeks. He made his comeback on 29 September in a 3–2 loss against Tottenham. Rooney scored his first goals of the season in a 4–2 league win at home to Stoke City on 20 October, where he reached his 200th club goal. On 7 November, he scored his first Champions League goal of the season, scoring a penalty in a 3–1 win against Braga. He scored twice and provided an assist in a 4–3 win against Reading on 1 December. He scored a brace in the Manchester derby at the City of Manchester Stadium on 9 December 2012 which United won 3–2. On 16 January, he scored a goal against West Ham in the FA Cup. A fortnight later, he scored twice in a 2–1 win against Southampton. He continued to score goals in FA Cup consecutive matches against Fulham and Chelsea. On 12 May, Alex Ferguson announced, after United's 2–1 win against Swansea City, that Rooney had handed in his transfer request, a match in which Rooney also requested not to play.

==== 2013–2015: Post-Fergie years ====
On 5 July 2013, new United manager David Moyes announced that Rooney was not for sale, after speculation that Chelsea, Arsenal, Real Madrid and Paris Saint-Germain were among the clubs looking to sign him. On 17 July 2013, Chelsea confirmed that they had made a bid for Rooney the previous day, thought to be in the region of £20 million, however it had been rejected by Manchester United. He suffered a head gash in training on 31 August after a collision with Phil Jones which kept him out of the match against Liverpool. He scored his first goal of the season with a free-kick in a 2–0 win against Crystal Palace. On 17 September, Rooney scored twice in a 4–2 win against Bayer Leverkusen in the Champions League, marking his 200th goal for United in the process. On 22 September, Rooney scored a late consolation goal from a free-kick in the 4–1 loss in the Manchester derby against Manchester City. He scored a brace against Tottenham at White Hart Lane in a 2–2 draw on 1 December. He scored his 150th league goal for the club with a volley against Hull City on 26 December as United came back from 2–0 deficit to win the match 3–2; he also provided assists for the other two goals. On 21 February 2014, Rooney signed a contract extension with Manchester United, which would have kept him at Old Trafford until 2019. Rooney provided one assist to Robin van Persie as Manchester United defeated Olympiacos in the second leg of Champions League round of 16 tie. On 22 March 2014, Rooney scored two goals for United at West Ham, moving him to third place on the club's all-time scoring list with 212 career goals. Rooney ended the season as both the top scorer and assist for Manchester United in the league with 17 goals and 10 assists. He also had the most assists in the 2013–14 Champions League with eight, beating second-placed Ángel Di María who had six.

"Wayne has shown a great attitude towards everything he does. I have been very impressed by his professionalism and his attitude to training and to my philosophy. He is a great inspiration to the younger members of the team and I believe he will put his heart and soul into his captaincy role."

— Louis van Gaal on naming Rooney Manchester United captain.

After the departure of Nemanja Vidić from Manchester United in July 2014, Rooney was named club captain by new manager Louis van Gaal ahead of the 2014–15 season. On the opening day of the Premier League season on 16 August, Rooney scored a bicycle kick to equalise against Swansea, although United eventually lost 1–2. On 27 September 2014, Rooney became the third highest Premier League goalscorer, moving ahead of Thierry Henry with 176 goals after he netted a goal in a 2–1 victory against West Ham. In the same match, he was sent off for a foul on Stewart Downing and received a three-game suspension. On 22 November 2014, Rooney scored for United in a 2–1 win against rivals Arsenal, their first away win of the season. He continued to score in the following match, in a 3–0 win over Hull City. On 14 December, he scored the opening goal in a 3–0 win over rivals Liverpool. On 26 December, Rooney scored two goals against Newcastle United, a match which his side won 3–1 – United's 50th successive Boxing Day match. For his performances, Rooney was voted as United's Player of the Month for December. During the season, Rooney was often deployed as a midfielder by Van Gaal.

On 16 February 2015, in an FA Cup match against Preston North End, Rooney was the subject of criticism for having dived to get a penalty; United would go on to win the match 3–1. Replays seemed to show that Rooney had not come in contact with the goalkeeper. England manager Roy Hodgson, however, defended Rooney, saying that he was forced to take evasive action. Rooney later apologised for his behaviour, saying, "that was my chance to get a penalty. I had to use that." The penalty was also Rooney's first goal in 2015, ending a goalless run. On 28 February 2015, he scored a brace in a 2–0 victory over Sunderland, thus becoming the first player to score more than 10 goals in 11 successive seasons. On 15 March, Rooney scored the third goal in a 3–0 win over Tottenham. Rooney was Manchester United's top goalscorer for the 2014–15 campaign, but his tally of 14 was the lowest by a leading scorer since 1982. United's goal total of 62 was also its second-worst in the Premier League era.

==== 2015–2017: Final years and exit ====
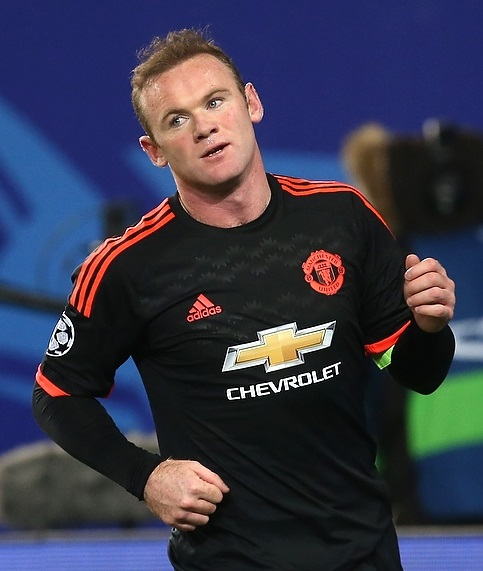
Rooney playing for Manchester United in a UEFA Champions League match against CSKA Moscow in Russia, October 2015

On 26 August 2015, Rooney ended an 878-minute scoreless streak by scoring a hat-trick in a 4–0 win (7–1 aggregate) over Belgian side Club Brugge in the second leg of their Champions League play-off. It was his first treble in European competition since his United debut against Fenerbahçe in 2004. He netted in a 3–0 win away to Everton on 17 October, putting him on 187 Premier League goals, joint second with Andy Cole and behind only Alan Shearer. After an injury-related absence, Rooney returned to the starting line-up on 19 December, making his 500th Manchester United appearance in a 2–1 home loss to Norwich City.

On 2 January 2016, Rooney scored in a 2–1 win over Swansea to move ahead of Cole as the Premier League's second top scorer of all time, and with 238 he surpassed Denis Law in United's top scorers of all time, behind only Bobby Charlton's 249. Fifteen days later, he scored the only goal in a win against Liverpool at Anfield, his 176th league goal for United, taking Thierry Henry's record for most goals for one club in the Premier League. After being ruled out since 13 February due to a knee injury, Rooney returned to the starting line-up in a 1–0 home win over Aston Villa on 16 April. On 21 May, Rooney captained Manchester United in the 2016 FA Cup Final against Crystal Palace. He played the full 120 minutes in central midfield, winning the competition for the first time in his career after a 2–1 extra time victory at Wembley Stadium.

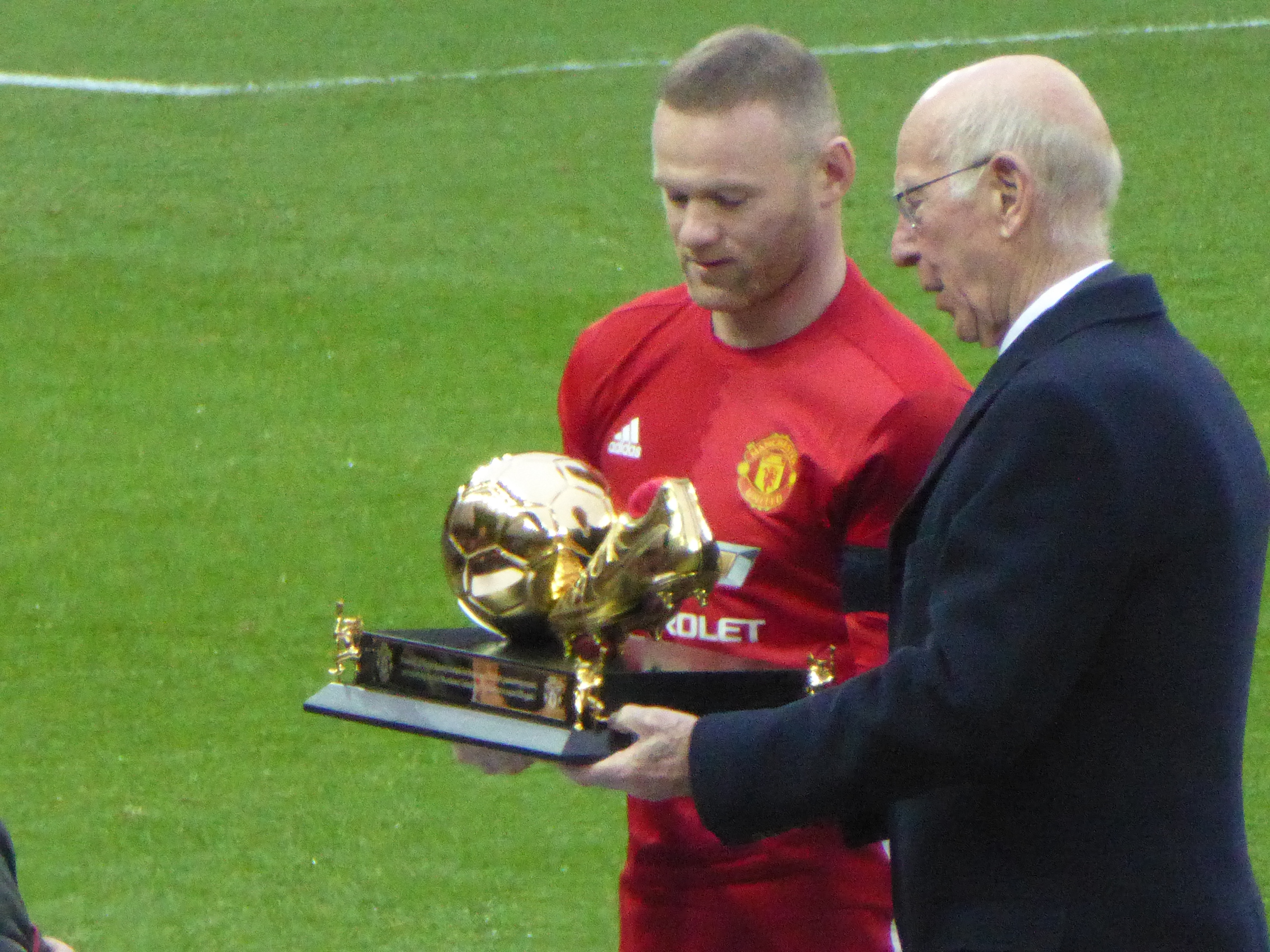
Rooney receiving an award for becoming Manchester United's record goalscorer from previous record holder Bobby Charlton in January 2017

On 7 August 2016, Rooney set up Jesse Lingard's opening goal in Manchester United's 2–1 victory over Leicester City in the 2016 FA Community Shield, lifting his second title as the club's captain. On 6 November 2016, Rooney became only the third player ever to achieve 100 Premier League assists, setting up both of Zlatan Ibrahimović's goals in a 3–1 away win against Swansea City. On 24 November, Rooney overtook Ruud van Nistelrooy to become Manchester United's all-time leading scorer in European competitions with 39 goals, opening the scoring in a 4–0 home win over Feyenoord in the Europa League.

On 7 January 2017, Rooney scored against Reading in the third round of the FA Cup to equal Bobby Charlton as Manchester United's top goalscorer of all time. Rooney's goal was his 249th in 543 games for Manchester United, reaching the landmark in 215 matches and four seasons quicker than Charlton. On 21 January 2017, Rooney finally surpassed Charlton to become the outright leading scorer for Manchester United after scoring his 250th goal for the club and the equaliser from a free kick against Stoke City at the Bet365 Stadium in the game's final minutes to secure a 1–1 draw. On 29 January, prior to playing his part in the 4–0 triumph in the FA Cup fourth round against Wigan Athletic, Rooney was presented with a commemorative Golden Boot to acknowledge him becoming the club's all-time leading goalscorer. It was presented by Charlton whose record Rooney broke. On 14 May 2017, in a 2–1 defeat at Tottenham Hotspur on the last day of the Premier League season, Rooney had the distinction of scoring the final goal at Spurs' White Hart Lane stadium. In his last game for Manchester United, Rooney came on as a substitute as United beat Ajax 2–0 to win the UEFA Europa League. He finished his Manchester United career as the all-time top scorer for the club with 253 goals, winning five Premier League titles and each of the Champions League, Europa League and FA Cup.

=== Later career ===
==== 2017–2018: Brief return to Everton ====
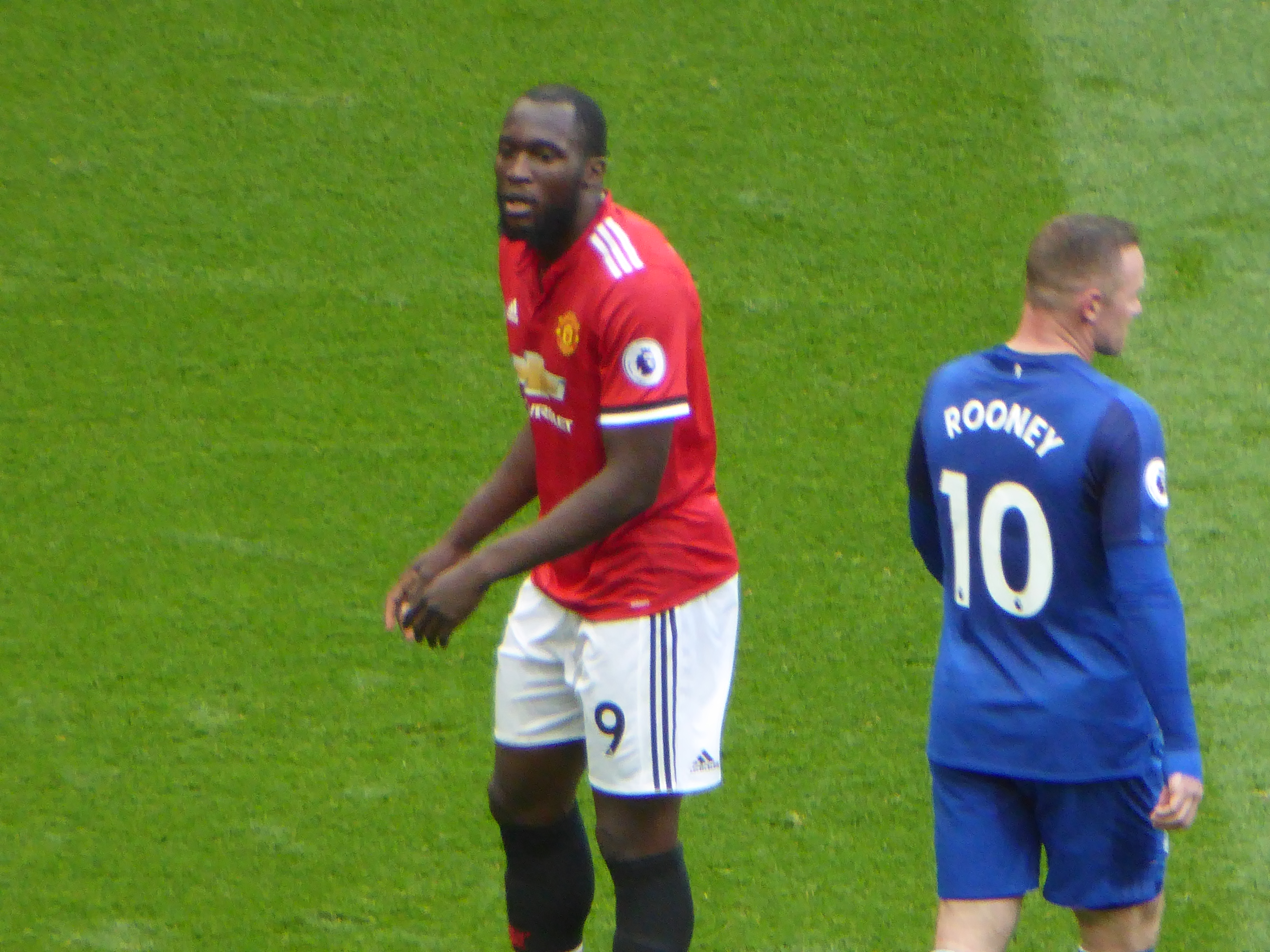
Rooney (pictured with Manchester United striker Romelu Lukaku in September 2017) retained the number 10 jersey at club level when he moved to Everton in July 2017.

After much speculation over the previous few months, it was confirmed on 9 July 2017 that Rooney would return to his boyhood club, Everton, on a two-year contract, after Manchester United allowed him to leave on a free transfer. Rooney was assigned the number 10 shirt for the 2017–18 campaign. He made his first official appearance on his return to the club in a 1–0 win over MFK Ružomberok in the UEFA Europa League third qualifying round first leg on 27 July. He scored on his second Everton league debut on 12 August, when his club beat Stoke City 1–0 at Goodison Park. Nine days later, Rooney scored his 200th Premier League goal in a 1–1 away draw against Manchester City, becoming the second player to reach this landmark, Alan Shearer being the first. On 29 November, Rooney scored his first hat-trick for Everton in 4–0 win over West Ham; his third goal was a strike from inside his own side's half of the field – over 60 yards from goal – scoring as goalkeeper Joe Hart left the penalty area to clear the ball.

In a 3–1 win against Swansea City on 18 December, Rooney scored a penalty and provided the assist for Gylfi Sigurðsson's goal, which put him ahead of Frank Lampard as the player with the third-highest amounts of assists in the Premier League, with 103. He appeared on Sky Sports' Monday Night Football as a pundit in February 2018, garnering praise from The Guardian writer Sachin Nakrani for being "articulate, intelligent, insightful and honest". On the show he named Anfield, home of Manchester United's rivals Liverpool, as his hardest test, with Rooney stating "I never enjoyed playing there".

==== 2018–2020: Relocation to MLS ====
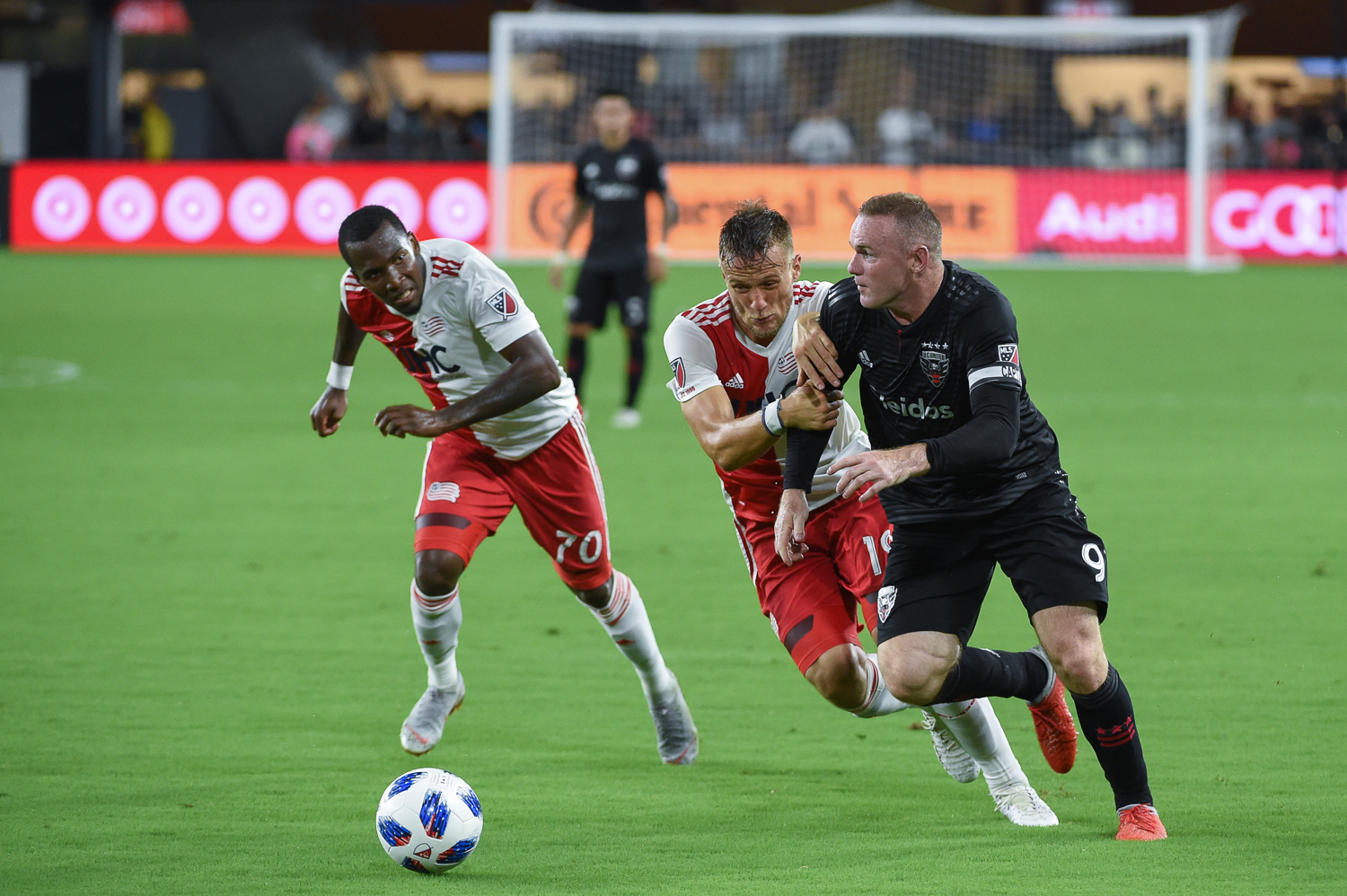
Rooney on the ball for D.C. United in August 2018

On 28 June 2018, Rooney signed a three-and-a-half-year deal with D.C. United of Major League Soccer, and was given the number 9 jersey. He officially completed his move to the Washington-based team when the US mid-season transfer window opened on 10 July.

Rooney made his debut for D.C. United on 14 July, coming on for Darren Mattocks in the 59th minute of a 3–1 win against the Vancouver Whitecaps; provided the assist for Paul Arriola's second goal, which gave D.C. a 3–0 lead. Rooney's debut came on the unveiling of Audi Field, D.C. United's new home stadium. Rooney was named captain after three games by manager Ben Olsen, with the consent of former captain Steve Birnbaum. His first goal for the club came on 28 July in his first game with the armband, slotting past his former Manchester United teammate, goalkeeper Tim Howard, securing a 2–1 win over the Colorado Rapids at Audi Field; he left the game with a broken nose after a clash of heads with Axel Sjöberg.

After putting in positive performances for D.C. United, including a last-ditch tackle and pass for the game-winning goal against Orlando on 12 August, and helping them to a play-off spot, he was named 'MLS Player of the Month' for the month of October 2018. His team made the 2018 MLS Cup Playoffs but were knocked out at home to the Columbus Crew in the first round, in which his attempt in the penalty shootout was saved by Zack Steffen. At the end of the 2018 MLS campaign, he was named as D.C. United's MVP and golden boot winner, having scored 12 goals in 21 matches.

On 16 March 2019, Rooney notched his first hat-trick for D.C. United in a 5–0 home win over Real Salt Lake, also contributing an assist, and later in the season he scored his 300th career goal at club level in a 2–1 away defeat to Houston Dynamo. On 27 June, Rooney scored from inside his own half for the third time in his career with a match-winning strike from 10 yards behind the halfway line to lob Orlando City goalkeeper Brian Rowe. He played his final match for the club on 19 October, in a 5–1 away defeat to Toronto FC, in the first round of the playoffs. He ended his time in the MLS with 23 goals and 15 assists in 48 regular-season appearances. He had a total of 25 goals in 52 appearances (all competitions) for D.C. United.

==== 2020–2021: Player-manager role at Derby County and retirement ====
On 6 August 2019, with two years left on his contract with D.C. United, Rooney agreed a deal to return to England as a player-coach with EFL Championship side Derby County in January 2020. Rooney was instantly named captain and his debut came on 2 January as he started and assisted the first goal in a 2–1 win against Barnsley. Rooney scored six goals in twenty four appearances, including the deciding goals in a 2–1 victory against Reading and a 1–0 win at Preston North End, as Derby finished the season in 10th.

Rooney's first goal of the 2020–21 season came in the fourth match as his 87th-minute free kick proved the difference in 1–0 win away to Norwich City. It was Derby's first win of the season and took the club out of the bottom three after opening the campaign with three successive defeats. Results did not improve however, with manager Phillip Cocu leaving by mutual consent after a 1–0 home defeat to Queens Park Rangers. Rooney in particular came under criticism for his performances in the opening stages of the season. It was announced on 26 November that Rooney, who had replaced Cocu as part of a four-man interim management team, would take sole control of the side for the upcoming match against Wycombe Wanderers and had removed himself from the playing squad, admitting that it was "possible" he had played his final game. On 15 January 2021, he retired from playing after being appointed permanent manager of Derby.

== International career ==
=== Early international career and Euro 2004 ===
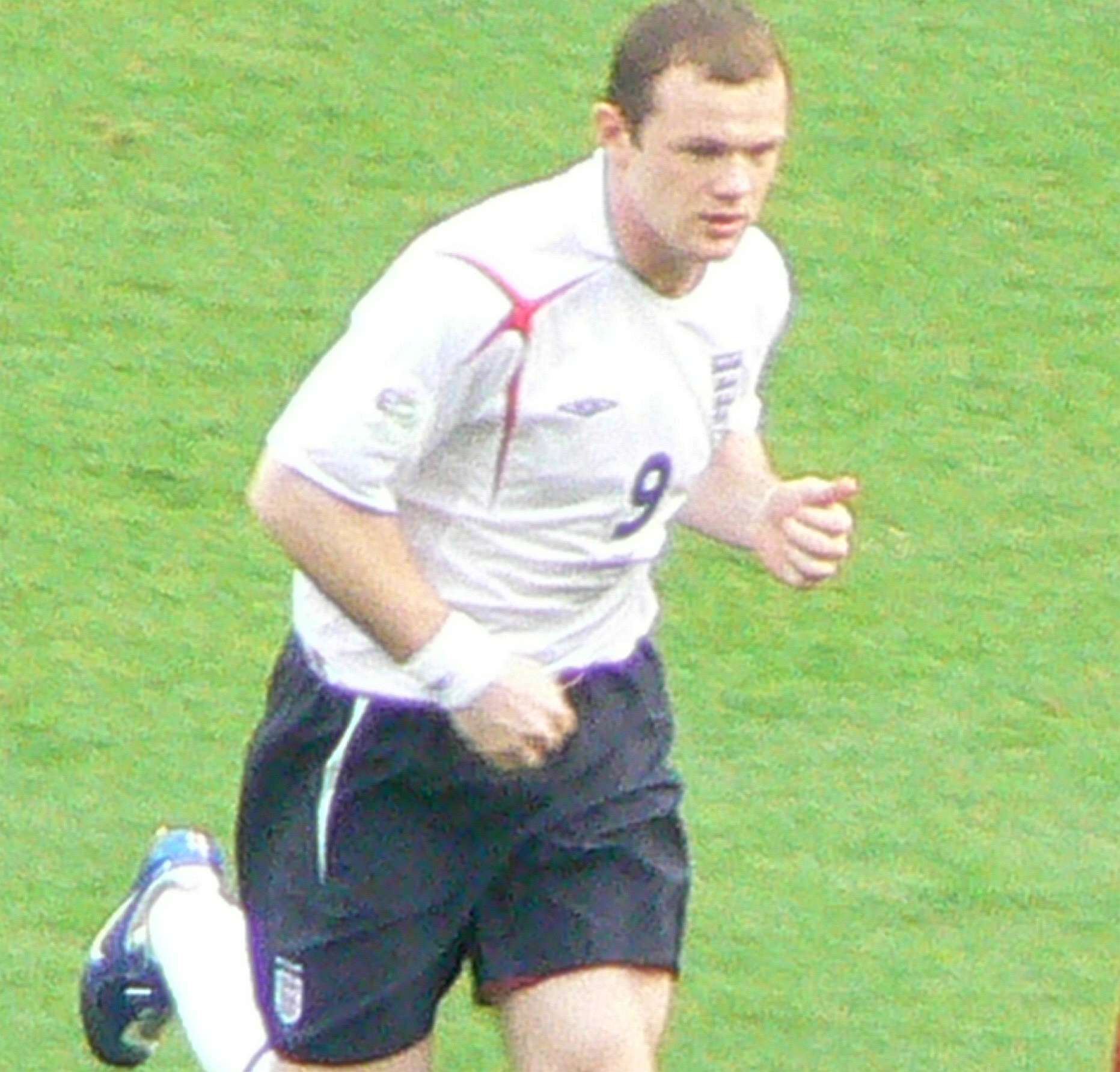
Rooney playing for England in 2006

Rooney was eligible to represent the Republic of Ireland, through his Irish paternal grandparents. In 2015, he confirmed that he had rejected an approach from Ireland at the age of 16, describing himself as "English through and through".

Rooney became the youngest player to play for England when he earned his first cap in a friendly defeat against Australia at the Boleyn Ground on 12 February 2003 at 17 years and 111 days, coming on at half-time as manager Sven-Göran Eriksson fielded a different team in each half. On 6 September of that year, aged 17 years and 317 days, he became the youngest player to score for England, equalising in a 2–1 away victory over Macedonia in a UEFA Euro 2004 qualifying match.

His first tournament action was at UEFA Euro 2004, in which he became the youngest scorer in competition history on 17 June 2004, when he scored twice in England's workgroup match against Switzerland, which ended in a 3–0 victory; however, this record was topped by Swiss midfielder Johan Vonlanthen four days later. Rooney added two more goals in the competition in England's final group match on 21 June, a 4–2 win over Croatia, but subsequently suffered an injury in the quarter-final match against hosts Portugal on 24 June, and England were eliminated on penalties. After scoring four goals in four matches, Rooney was named in UEFA's Team of the Tournament.

=== 2006 and 2010 World Cups ===
Following a foot injury in an April 2006 Premier League match, Rooney faced a race to fitness for the 2006 FIFA World Cup. England attempted to hasten his recovery with the use of an oxygen tent, which allowed Rooney to enter a group match against Trinidad and Tobago and start the next match against Sweden. However, he never got back into game shape and went scoreless as England bowed out in the quarter-finals, again on penalty kicks.

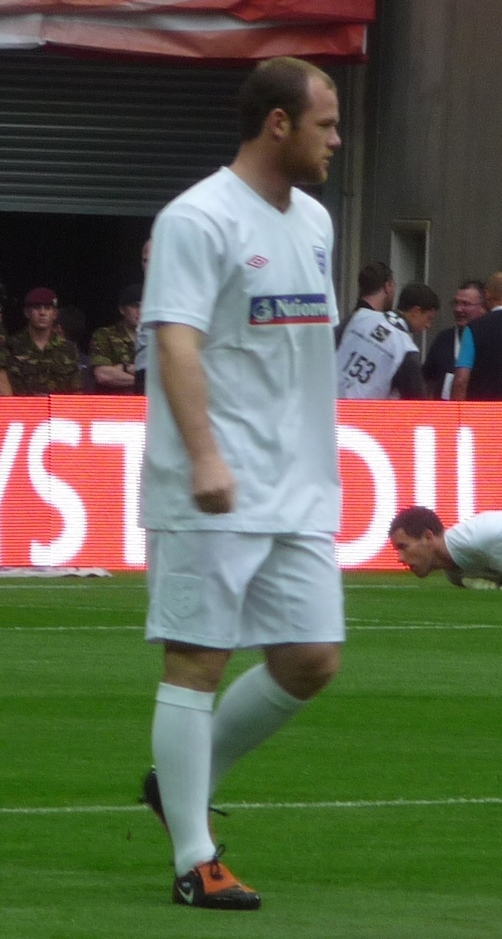
Rooney training with England in September 2009

Rooney was red-carded in the 62nd minute of the quarter-final for stamping on Portugal defender Ricardo Carvalho as both attempted to gain possession of the ball. Rooney seemed to be pulled back by Carvalho, and then trod on his opponent's groin as the Chelsea defender was on the floor trying to win the ball, an incident that occurred right in front of the Argentine referee Horacio Elizondo.

Portugal winger (and Rooney's Manchester United teammate) Cristiano Ronaldo protested his actions, and was in turn pushed by Rooney. Elizondo sent Rooney off, after which Ronaldo was seen winking at the Portugal bench. Rooney denied intentionally targeting Carvalho in a statement on 3 July, adding,

I bear no ill feeling to Cristiano but I'm disappointed that he chose to get involved. I suppose I do, though, have to remember that on that particular occasion we were not teammates.

Elizondo confirmed the next day that Rooney was dismissed solely for the infraction on Carvalho. Rooney was fined CHF5,000 for the incident.

Rooney top scored for England in their 2010 World Cup qualifying campaign with nine goals; one behind the UEFA section's overall top goalscorer, Theofanis Gekas of Greece. On 14 November 2009, Rooney captained England for the first time in a pre-tournament friendly with Brazil.

Rooney was given the England number 10 shirt by manager Fabio Capello ahead of the 2010 FIFA World Cup in South Africa. During the tournament, England drew 0–0 in their second group match against Algeria on 18 June, and the England players were booed off the pitch by their supporters; Rooney was at the centre of controversy when he criticised the England fans for booing the team after the match, and subsequently apologised for his actions. Rooney went scoreless throughout the tournament, and England were eliminated in the second round, following a 4–1 defeat to Germany on 27 June.

=== Euro 2012 ===
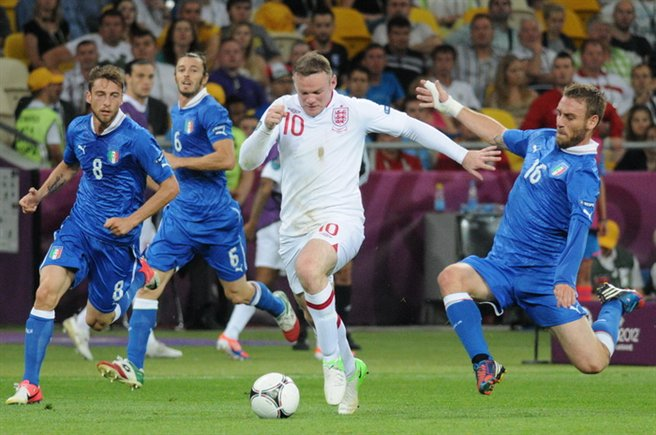
Rooney taking on the Italian defence at UEFA Euro 2012

The Euro 2012 qualification campaign went well for England, as they qualified at the top of their group, winning five and drawing three games. Rooney scored three goals, one against Switzerland and two against Bulgaria. In the last qualifier against Montenegro (2–2), Rooney was sent off for a tackle on Miodrag Džudović in the 74th minute. It was anticipated that Rooney would miss at least one match in the opening round of the first phase at UEFA Euro 2012. After the game, Rooney sent a personal letter to UEFA in which he apologised and expressed regret for the tackle on Džudović which earned him the red card.

Despite the letter, UEFA punished Rooney with a three-game ban, meaning that he could not play in any of the group stage matches. After UEFA's announcement, Džudović stated that he believed the sentence for Rooney was too severe and that he would defend him if needed. He later asked the UEFA to pardon Rooney. The FA then decided they would appeal to UEFA against the ban. On 8 December 2011, after the FA had appealed the ban, UEFA reduced the sentence to two matches. This meant that Rooney missed the matches against France and Sweden. He was able to play in the final match of the group stage against Ukraine on 19 June 2012, scoring the only goal of the game, allowing England to progress to the quarter-finals. England were eventually knocked out in the quarter-finals against Italy, who, after a scoreless 120 minutes, won 4–2 on penalties, although Rooney was able to net his spot-kick. After another international tournament in which the English media criticised Rooney's performances, Fabio Capello claimed Rooney "only plays well in Manchester".

=== 2014 World Cup ===
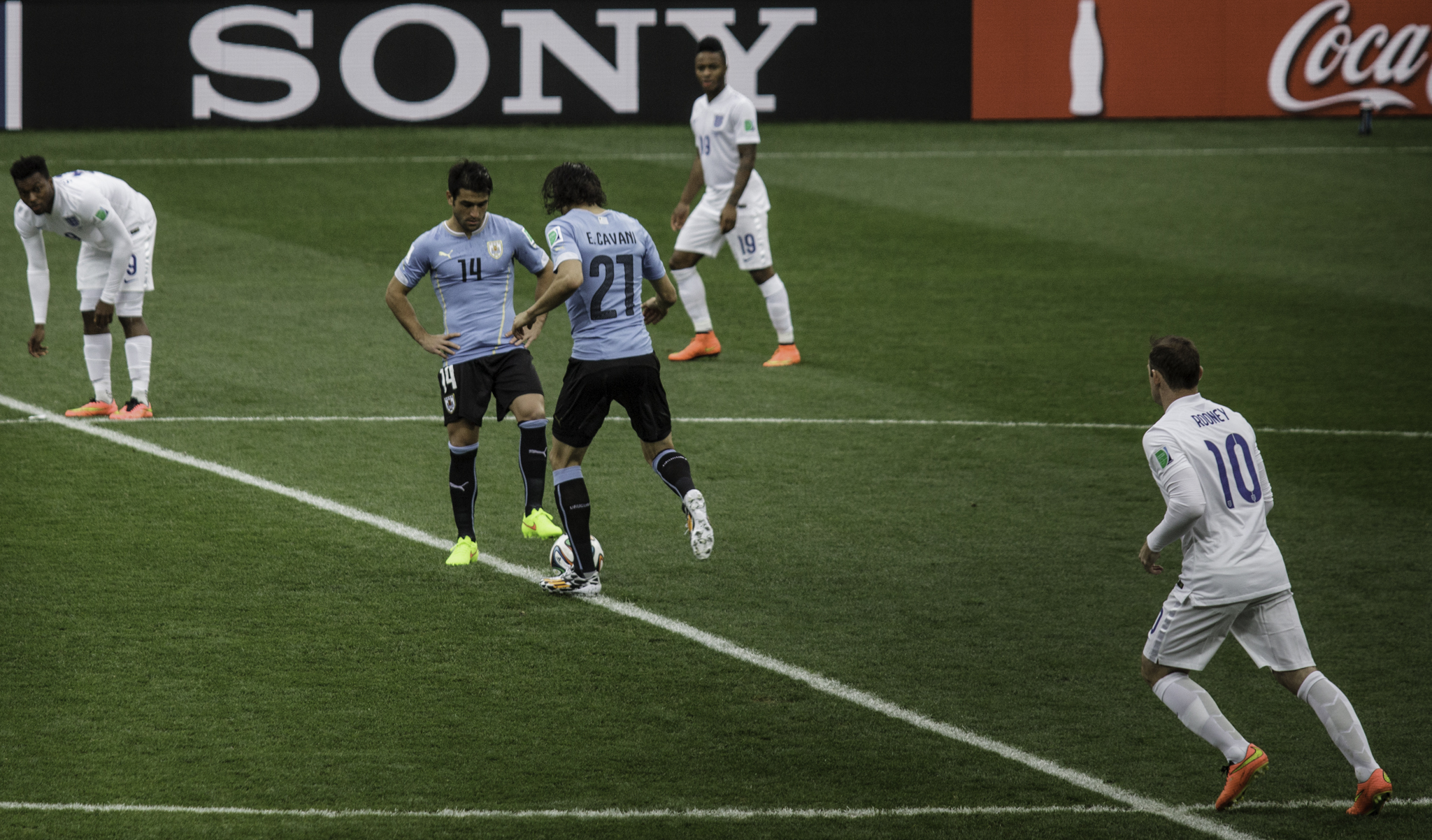
Rooney (number 10) playing for England against Uruguay at the 2014 FIFA World Cup

On 12 October 2012, Rooney became England's fifth-highest goalscorer of all time after scoring his 30th and 31st international goals in a 2014 World Cup qualifier against San Marino. Rooney captained England for the first time in a competitive match in the same game. On 6 February 2013, Rooney scored in a 2–1 win against five-time world champions Brazil at Wembley in a friendly. In March, he scored goals against San Marino and Montenegro in World Cup qualifying, before scoring against Brazil again in a 2–2 draw on 2 June, in the official re-opening of the refurbished Maracanã Stadium. On 11 October 2013, Rooney became England's all-time top goalscorer in competitive internationals when he scored his 27th competitive goal in a 4–1 World Cup qualifier against Montenegro. Rooney ended the 2014 World Cup qualification campaign as England's top scorer with seven goals.

At the 2014 FIFA World Cup, Rooney started in England's first group match against Italy, setting up Daniel Sturridge's temporary equaliser, in a 2–1 loss. In England's second 2014 World Cup group match against Uruguay at the Arena Corinthians, Rooney scored his first ever goal at a World Cup finals with a 75th-minute equaliser in a 2–1 loss. England drew their final group match 0–0 against Costa Rica, and were eliminated from the World Cup, finishing last in their group; despite playing a part in both of England's goals, Rooney was criticised by English pundits for his performance in the tournament.

=== Euro 2016 ===
Following Steven Gerrard's international retirement after the 2014 FIFA World Cup, Roy Hodgson named Rooney as England's new captain. On 3 September 2014, in the first match of his captaincy, Rooney scored a penalty against Norway to give England a 1–0 friendly win. Later on, he showed his leadership qualities by calling player-only meetings in September 2014 to reflect on the players' performance and discuss how they could do better as a team. Rooney said,

Obviously the manager gives us our game plan, but because we don't spend that much time together as a team we need to know and feel confident in what we're doing as a team together. In the meetings, you're having the players speak up who wouldn't normally speak up when coaches are there.

On 15 November 2014, Rooney won his 100th England cap against Slovenia in a Euro 2016 qualifying match, scoring a penalty to equalise in a 3–1 win. In another qualifier away to the same opponents on 14 June 2015, Rooney scored the winner with four minutes remaining for a 3–2 victory, his 48th international goal putting him joint second in England's list alongside Gary Lineker, and one behind Bobby Charlton. In his 106th England appearance, he equalled Charlton's record of 49 goals (also in 106 matches) on 5 September 2015 by scoring a penalty against San Marino. On 8 September 2015, Rooney broke Charlton's England goalscoring record, netting his 50th international goal from a penalty in a Euro 2016 qualifying match against Switzerland, at Wembley, in his 107th appearance for England, also equalling Ashley Cole as his country's fifth-highest capped player; this was also his 300th professional career goal.

In England's opening match of UEFA Euro 2016 against Russia at the Stade Vélodrome in Marseille on 11 June, Rooney was selected to start in central midfield and was named man of the match by the BBC after a 1–1 draw. On 27 June, he scored the opening goal against Iceland in the round of 16 from a penalty in the 4th minute. However England would lose the match 2-1 which eliminated them from the tournament.

=== 2018 World Cup qualification and retirement ===
On 4 September 2016, Rooney earned his 116th appearance for England in 1–0 away win over Slovakia in the 2018 FIFA World Cup qualifiers, making him the nation's most-capped outfield player of all time, and England's second highest appearance maker behind Peter Shilton. A few days earlier, he had confirmed that he would retire from international football after the finals in Russia. In March 2017, Rooney had been left out of the England squad by England boss Gareth Southgate. Following Rooney's return to Everton in July, which saw him put on a string of impressive performances, Southgate wanted to recall Rooney back to the England squad for the upcoming 2018 FIFA World Cup qualifiers. However, Rooney announced his early retirement from international football with immediate effect on 23 August 2017, snubbing Southgate's recall.

On 4 November 2018, it was confirmed that Rooney would come out of international retirement to play one final match for the England national football team against the United States at Wembley Stadium on 15 November. This was in order to promote The Wayne Rooney Foundation, a newly formed charity; consequently, the match was called the "Wayne Rooney Foundation International". He came on in the 58th minute of England's eventual 3–0 home win, ending his international career with 120 appearances.

== Managerial career ==
=== Derby County ===
After a poor start to the 2020–21 season saw Derby County bottom of the Championship table – their lowest position for 12 years – Derby boss Phillip Cocu was sacked, and Rooney was appointed as part of a four-man interim coaching staff alongside Liam Rosenior, Shay Given and Justin Walker on 14 November 2020. His debut a week later saw Derby lose 1–0 at Bristol City to leave them at the foot of the table and three points from safety, though Rooney said he could guarantee that the side would "get better (and) get out of the situation we're in and... start winning games." Following a "painful and chastening" 3–0 defeat to Middlesbrough it was announced that Rooney would take sole control of the side for the next match and had removed himself from the playing squad, with Rooney making clear his desire to take the role full time. Rooney started sole charge with The Rams in 24th, six points adrift of safety and on a run of four consecutive defeats; after improving Derby's form enough to get them out of the relegation zone he was appointed as permanent manager on 15 January.

By mid-February 2021, having accrued 31 points from a possible 54 in his 18 games in sole charge, taking Derby up to 18th in the league and eight points clear of the relegation zone, Rooney was feted by the press for "convincing the doubters" and found himself as 25/1 outsider for the Celtic job following the resignation of Neil Lennon. Following this, however, form faltered badly with just one win from fourteen leaving Derby firmly in trouble, with Rooney's side being criticised for their poor game management and sloppy defending and suggestion that Rooney came across "as a manager who's accepted defeat, who's surrender [sic] himself to whatever results might come his way" and should be replaced. Others defended Rooney, saying that though he had made mistakes, particularly in making "too many changes to personnel and shape/tactics" he had not been helped by injuries and too many players who had "been inconsistent (and) unable to maintain form both during a game and from game to game". However, at the last match of the season, Derby County drew 3–3 at home with Sheffield Wednesday to barely avoid relegation.

Incurring 21 points of deductions, Derby were relegated to League One at the end of the 2021–22 season, having spent almost the entire season in administration. With Derby still in administration going into the League One season, Rooney resigned as manager on 24 June 2022.

=== D.C. United ===
On 12 July 2022, Rooney was announced as head coach for his former club, MLS side D.C. United. He replaced outgoing manager Hernán Losada, on a contract to the end of the 2023 season. Rooney won 2–1 at home to Orlando City on his debut on 31 July 2022, and picked up 9 points from the 14 last games of the season as his team ranked last in the Eastern Conference. At the end of the 2023 regular season, on 8 October, Rooney and the club agreed to mutually part ways, after United failed to qualify for the playoffs for a second straight season.

=== Birmingham City ===
On 11 October 2023, Rooney made his return to English football as he was appointed manager of EFL Championship club Birmingham City on a three-and-a-half-year contract. He was appointed by American new owners Shelby Companies Limited, and replaced the sacked John Eustace at the sixth-placed club. Rooney brought his former teammates Ashley Cole and John O'Shea into his coaching staff.

On his debut 10 days later, Rooney's team lost 1–0 at Middlesbrough, managed by his former United and England teammate Michael Carrick. He earned one point from his first five games, seeing his team fall to 18th in the table. Rooney earned his first victory as Birmingham manager with a 2–1 defeat of bottom side Sheffield Wednesday on 25 November 2023.

On 2 January 2024, Rooney was sacked by the club after winning just twice in 15 matches, leaving Birmingham in 20th position. Both before and after his tenure at St Andrew's, Rooney was likened to Gianfranco Zola, who was appointed by new owners in 2016 in place of the less recognisable Gary Rowett and oversaw a decline in results. Birmingham ended the season relegated to the third tier for the first time since 1995, and Rooney's spell in charge was mentioned by fans and media as a leading reason for the relegation.

=== Plymouth Argyle ===
On 25 May 2024, Rooney was appointed manager of EFL Championship club Plymouth Argyle on a three-year contract. In his first game, on 11 August, his team lost 4–0 away to Sheffield Wednesday.

On 31 December 2024, with the team in last place and four points from safety, Rooney left Plymouth in a mutual agreement with the club. According to Alan Richardson of BBC Radio Devon, Rooney's Plymouth attempted the possession-based football associated with Pep Guardiola but lacked an alternative when teams set up to counter that tactic. Form was particularly poor away from home, where the Pilgrims only earned two points from 13 games, scoring three goals and conceding 35. The team also suffered from extensive injuries, including to key attacking player Morgan Whittaker. Rooney was described as being popular with Plymouth players, fans and the local media.

== Style of play ==
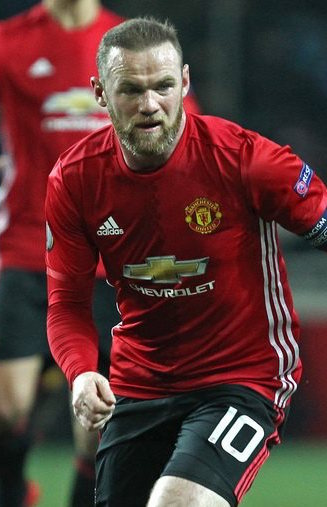
Rooney pictured with Manchester United in 2016

Regarded as one of the best players of his generation, Rooney was a creative, energetic forward who combined technical skill with strength and physicality, while also excelling in the air despite being 5 feet 9 inches (1.76 m) tall. He was a versatile attacker, capable of playing anywhere along the front line; although his preferred role was as a striker. Rooney was also used as a supporting forward, or even as a winger. As his pace and movement declined as he entered his thirties, he was deployed in deeper, more creative roles, as an attacking midfielder, as a deep-lying playmaker, or even as a central or box-to-box midfielder, in particular under former manager Louis van Gaal, due to his vision, range of passing, runs forward from midfield, and team-work. He was also occasionally deployed as a false attacking midfielder, and as a false 9 throughout his career.

A prolific goalscorer in his prime at Manchester United, Rooney was a powerful striker of the ball and an accurate finisher, capable of scoring both inside and outside the penalty area, as well as from volleys. His ball striking ability saw him score from inside his own half for Manchester United, Everton, and D.C. United. He was praised for his work-rate and stamina by players, managers and the media, and was highly regarded for his dedication and willingness to press opponents when possession had been lost in order to win back the ball and start attacking plays. While not known to be particularly prolific from free kicks, he also often took set pieces and penalties throughout his career, although his record from the spot was somewhat inconsistent. ESPN said that Rooney's 2009–10 season saw him reach the same level as Messi and Ronaldo, which was the first season since Ronaldo and Carlos Tevez departed United.

Due to his precocious displays as a teenager, Wayne Rooney was given the nicknames "Wazza" (a reference to former England international Paul "Gazza" Gascoigne, who was also a gifted player troubled by off-field issues), "The Wonder Boy", "the new Pelé", and "the white Pelé". Rooney was a fast, agile player in his youth; however, several injuries throughout his career, in addition to weight issues, affected his speed and mobility as his career progressed, which led to some in the game accusing him of not quite living up to his full potential. He was warned about his fitness on numerous occasions by his manager Alex Ferguson, who said of Rooney, "He is very stocky, he is going to have to train well all the time." Former Manchester United fitness coach Mick Clegg, stated, "Wayne didn't see the importance of the gym really. He'd say 'I'm here to play football." Rooney was criticised for his behaviour and aggression on the pitch at times, which led him to pick up unnecessary bookings.

Formerly the all-time leading goalscorer for the England national team, Rooney is viewed as one of England's greatest players. In 2017, Gareth Southgate said: "You've got very good players and then there are top players. In my time in the England setup, Paul Gascoigne, Paul Scholes and Rooney just had that little bit more than all the others. And we are talking high‑level people there, players like Steven Gerrard, Frank Lampard and David Beckham." Vice hailed Rooney as "the most exquisite player of an entire English generation".

== Personal life ==
In addition to Everton, Rooney also supports Celtic. He is also a supporter of the Leeds Rhinos rugby league club. Rooney, originally a boxer, still practices the sport recreationally for stress relief. A friend of boxer Ricky Hatton, in 2007 he carried one of Hatton's belts into the ring in his world light-welterweight title fight against José Luis Castillo in Las Vegas. The decision of Hatton (a Manchester City fan) to have a Manchester United striker carry the belt prompted threats of a boycott among the many Manchester City supporters who made up Hatton's fanbase. Hatton responded, "Nobody hates United more than me. Just because I don't support his team doesn't mean I can't admire what he has done." Rooney has a number of tattoos, including one of a Celtic cross on his arm.

=== Family ===
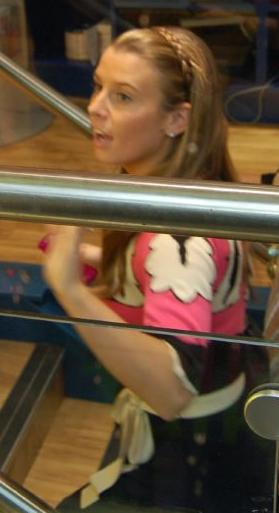
Rooney's wife, Coleen, in October 2006

Rooney met his wife, Coleen (née McLoughlin), while both were at secondary school. They married on 12 June 2008 after six years of dating. He has a tattoo of the words "Just Enough Education to Perform", the title of an album by his favourite band, the Stereophonics; Coleen arranged for the group to play at their wedding reception. The wedding ran into some controversy with the Catholic Church. The couple held a religious ceremony at the Abbey of Cervara, a converted monastery near Genoa, despite being warned by the local bishop's office against the plan. The bishop's office told the Rooneys that La Cervara is deconsecrated and not suitable for a wedding. It suggested a different church, five miles away. Nevertheless, the couple ignored the advice and Father Edward Quinn, their local Catholic priest from Croxteth, presided over the ceremony. Coleen's favourite pop band, Westlife, also sang at the wedding reception.

The couple have four sons: Kai Wayne (born 2 November 2009), Klay Anthony (born 21 May 2013), Kit Joseph (born 24 January 2016), and Cass Mac (born 15 February 2018). Kai Rooney signed with Manchester United in 2020, becoming a second-generation player for the Red Devils.

In 2004, Rooney admitted to soliciting prostitutes in Liverpool, while dating his then-girlfriend. "I was young and stupid. It was at a time when I was very young and immature and before I had settled down with Coleen." In April 2006, Rooney was awarded £100,000 in libel damages from tabloids The Sun and News of the World, who had claimed that he had assaulted Coleen in a nightclub. Rooney donated the money to charity.

Rooney's younger brother, John Rooney, is also a former footballer and now manages Macclesfield. Rooney's cousin, Tommy Rooney, played for Macclesfield Town in 2004. Another cousin, Jake Rooney, is also a professional footballer for Derby County.

=== Commercial interests ===
Rooney has had endorsement deals with Nike, Nokia, Ford, Asda, and Coca-Cola. He appeared on seven consecutive UK-version covers of Electronic Arts' FIFA video game series from FIFA 06 to FIFA 12. His "knockout" goal celebration – a tongue in cheek celebration by Rooney inspired by getting knocked out by his ex teammate Phil Bardsley in his home – appears in FIFA 18. He has featured in Nike commercials, including Write the Future directed by Alejandro González Iñárritu in 2010 where he is knighted, and a tabloid shows his face carved into the Cliffs of Dover with the headline "JUST ROO IT!". In October 2010, Rooney was dropped by Coca-Cola from an advertising campaign following issues surrounding his private life. In 2012, Rooney's reported income of US$32.6 million listed him as the world's fifth highest-paid footballer, following Lionel Messi, David Beckham, Cristiano Ronaldo, and Samuel Eto'o.

In July 2011, jerseys with Rooney's name and number (Rooney, 10) were the best-selling sports product under the auspices of the Premier League – taking over top spot from Liverpool striker Fernando Torres (Torres, 9) and becoming the first United player to top the list since Cristiano Ronaldo's number 7 jersey in 2008. During the 2009–10 season, Manchester United sold between 1.2 million and 1.5 million shirts and it is estimated that of that, Rooney's name was printed on several hundred thousand. The account is taken from official jerseys sales across the globe, not just in England.

On 9 March 2006, Rooney signed what was, at the time, the largest sports book deal in publishing history with HarperCollins, who granted him a £5 million advance plus royalties for a minimum of five books to be published over a 12-year period. The first, My Story So Far, an autobiography ghostwritten by Hunter Davies, was published after the 2006 World Cup. The second publication, The Official Wayne Rooney Annual, was aimed at the teenage market and edited by football journalist Chris Hunt. His third book, My Decade in the Premier League, was published in September 2012.

In July 2006, Rooney's lawyers went to the United Nations' World Intellectual Property Organization (WIPO) to gain ownership of the Internet domain names waynerooney.com and waynerooney.co.uk, both of which Welsh actor Huw Marshall registered in 2002. Three months later, the WIPO awarded Rooney the rights to waynerooney.com.

=== Social media ===
In October 2014, Rooney became the first Premier League footballer to reach 10 million followers on social networking site Twitter. That same month, Rooney was the fifth-most-followed footballer (and sixth-most-followed sportsperson) globally on Twitter. In terms of top UK Twitter individuals, Rooney ranked at number 9 in October 2014.

=== Paul Stretford controversy ===
In July 2002, while Rooney was with Everton, agent Paul Stretford encouraged Rooney and his parents to enter the player into an eight-year contract with Proactive Sports Management. However, Rooney was already with another representation firm at the time, while Stretford's transaction went unreported to the FA, and he was thus charged with improper conduct. Stretford alleged in his October 2004 trial that he had secretly recorded boxing promoter John Hyland and two other men threatening and attempting to blackmail him for an undisclosed percentage of Rooney's earnings.

Stretford's case collapsed due to evidence that conflicted with his insistence that he had not signed Rooney, and on 9 July 2008, he was found guilty of "making of false and/or misleading witness statements to police, and giving false and/or misleading testimony". In addition, the contract to which Stretford had signed Rooney was two years longer than the limit allowed by the FA. Stretford was fined £300,000 and given an 18-month ban as a football agent, a verdict he appealed.

Stretford left Proactive in 2008 and took Rooney with him. Proactive later sued Rooney, claiming £4.3 million in withheld commissions. In July 2010, Proactive was awarded £90,000 as restitution.

=== David Moyes ===
On 1 September 2006, then-Everton manager David Moyes sued Rooney for libel after the tabloid newspaper the Daily Mail published excerpts from Rooney's 2006 autobiography that accused the manager of leaking Rooney's reasons for leaving the club to the press. The case was settled out of court for £500,000 on 3 June 2008, and Rooney apologised to Moyes for "false claims" he had made in the book regarding the matter.

=== Allegations of infidelity ===
Big Brother winner Helen Wood claims Rooney paid £1,000 for a threesome with her and Jennifer Thompson in a Manchester hotel while his wife was five months' pregnant in July 2008. It was reported that his solicitors unsuccessfully tried to fight the allegations when they first surfaced in early August 2010.

=== Legal issues ===
==== Drink-driving conviction ====
On 1 September 2017, Rooney was arrested in Wilmslow by Cheshire police after being caught driving over the prescribed alcohol limit. He appeared at Stockport Magistrates' Court on 18 September and pleaded guilty to drink driving. Rooney was fined £170 by the court and banned from driving for two years, and was ordered to complete 100 hours of unpaid work as part of a twelve-month community order; Everton fined him two weeks' wages, which was in the region of £300,000.

==== Intoxication and profanity arrest ====
On 16 December 2018, Rooney was arrested at Washington Dulles International Airport in Loudoun County, Virginia, United States, charged with public intoxication and use of profanity in public. He was released without bail on a personal recognizance bond, then fined US$25 plus US$91 in costs without going to court.

== Career statistics ==
=== Club ===
Appearances and goals by club, season and competition
Club	Season	League			National cup (Note: Includes FA Cup, U.S. Open Cup)		League cup (Note: Includes Football League/EFL Cup)		Continental		Other		Total	
Club	Season	Division	Apps	Goals	Apps	Goals	Apps	Goals	Apps	Goals	Apps	Goals	Apps	Goals
Everton	2002–03	Premier League	33	6	1	0	3	2	—		—		37	8
Everton	2003–04	Premier League	34	9	3	0	3	0	—		—		40	9
Everton	Total		67	15	4	0	6	2	0	0	0	0	77	17
Manchester United	2004–05	Premier League	29	11	6	3	2	0	6 (Note: Appearances in UEFA Champions League)	3	0	0	43	17
Manchester United	2005–06	Premier League	36	16	3	0	4	2	5	1	—		48	19
Manchester United	2006–07	Premier League	35	14	7	5	1	0	12	4	—		55	23
Manchester United	2007–08	Premier League	27	12	4	2	0	0	11	4	1 (Note: Appearance in FA Community Shield)	0	43	18
Manchester United	2008–09	Premier League	30	12	2	1	1	0	13	4	3 (Note: One appearance in UEFA Super Cup, two appearances and three goals in FIFA Club World Cup)	3	49	20
Manchester United	2009–10	Premier League	32	26	1	0	3	2	7	5	1	1	44	34
Manchester United	2010–11	Premier League	28	11	2	1	0	0	9	4	1	0	40	16
Manchester United	2011–12	Premier League	34	27	1	2	0	0	7 (Note: Four appearances and two goals in UEFA Champions League, three appearances and three goals in UEFA Europa League)	5	1	0	43	34
Manchester United	2012–13	Premier League	27	12	3	3	1	0	6	1	—		37	16
Manchester United	2013–14	Premier League	29	17	0	0	2	0	9	2	0	0	40	19
Manchester United	2014–15	Premier League	33	12	4	2	0	0	—		—		37	14
Manchester United	2015–16	Premier League	28	8	5	2	2	1	6	4	—		41	15
Manchester United	2016–17	Premier League	25	5	2	1	4	0	7 (Note: Appearances in UEFA Europa League)	2	1	0	39	8
Manchester United	Total		393	183	40	22	20	5	98	39	8	4	559	253
Everton	2017–18	Premier League	31	10	1	0	1	0	7	1	—		40	11
D.C. United	2018	MLS	20	12	0	0	—		—		1 (Note: Appearance in MLS Cup playoffs)	0	21	12
D.C. United	2019	MLS	28	11	2	2	—		—		1	0	31	13
D.C. United	Total		48	23	2	2	0	0	0	0	2	0	52	25
Derby County	2019–20	Championship	20	5	4	1	—		—		—		24	6
Derby County	2020–21	Championship	10	1	0	0	1	0	—		—		11	1
Derby County	Total		30	6	4	1	1	0	0	0	0	0	35	7
Career total			569	237	51	25	28	7	105	40	10	4	763	313

=== International ===
Appearances and goals by national team and year
National team	Year	Apps	Goals
England	2003	9	3
England	2004	11	6
England	2005	8	2
England	2006	8	1
England	2007	4	2
England	2008	8	5
England	2009	9	6
England	2010	11	1
England	2011	5	2
England	2012	5	4
England	2013	10	6
England	2014	13	8
England	2015	8	5
England	2016	10	2
England	2017	0	0
England	2018	1	0
Total		120	53

=== Managerial ===
As of match played 29 December 2024

Managerial record by team and tenure
Team	From	To	Record					Ref.
Team	From	To	Pld	W	D	L	Win %	Ref.
Derby County	14 November 2020	26 June 2022	85	24	22	39	28.2	
D.C. United	31 July 2022	7 October 2023	53	14	14	25	26.4	
Birmingham City	11 October 2023	2 January 2024	15	2	4	9	13.3	
Plymouth Argyle	25 May 2024	31 December 2024	25	5	6	14	20.0	
Total			178	45	46	87	25.3	—

== Honours ==
=== Player ===
Manchester United

- Premier League: 2006–07, 2007–08, 2008–09, 2010–11, 2012–13
- FA Cup: 2015–16; runner-up: 2004–05, 2006–07
- Football League/EFL Cup: 2005–06, 2009–10, 2016–17
- FA Community Shield: 2007, 2010, 2011, 2016
- UEFA Champions League: 2007–08; runner-up: 2008–09, 2010–11
- UEFA Europa League: 2016–17
- FIFA Club World Cup: 2008

England U17

- UEFA European Under-17 Championship third place: 2002

Individual

- UEFA European Under-17 Championship Golden Player: 2002
- PFA Players' Player of the Year: 2009–10
- PFA Young Player of the Year: 2004–05, 2005–06
- PFA Fans' Player of the Year: 2005–06, 2009–10
- PFA Team of the Year: 2005–06 Premier League, 2009–10 Premier League, 2011–12 Premier League
- FWA Footballer of the Year: 2009–10
- Sir Matt Busby Player of the Year: 2005–06, 2009–10
- Manchester United Players' Player of the Year: 2009–10
- Manchester Goal of the Season: 2009–10 (v. Arsenal, 31 January 2010), 2010–11 (v. Manchester City, 12 February 2011), 2013–14 (v. West Ham United, 22 March 2014)
- BBC Young Sports Personality of the Year: 2002
- Bravo Award: 2003
- Golden Boy Award: 2004
- UEFA European Championship Team of the Tournament: 2004
- FIFPRO Young Player of the Year: 2004–05
- Premier League Hall of Fame: 2022
- Premier League Player of the Season: 2009–10
- Premier League Player of the Month: February 2005, December 2005, March 2006, October 2007, January 2010
- Premier League top assist provider: 2006–07 (shared)
- UEFA Champions League top assist provider: 2013–14
- England Senior Men's Player of the Year: 2008, 2009, 2014, 2015
- FIFA Club World Cup Golden Ball: 2008
- FIFA FIFPRO World XI: 2011
- FIFA FIFPRO World XI 4th team: 2013
- FIFA FIFPRO World XI 5th team: 2014, 2015
- Premier League 20 Seasons Awards (1992–93 to 2011–12): Best Goal (v. Manchester City, 12 February 2011)
- Alan Hardaker Trophy: 2006
- Premier League Goal of the Month: November 2017
- FWA Tribute Award: 2017
- MLS Player of the Month: October 2018
- MLS Best XI: 2018
- D.C. United MVP: 2018
- D.C. United Golden Boot Winner: 2018
- MLS All-Star: 2019
- Globe Soccer Awards Player Career Award: 2022

Records

- Manchester United all-time top scorer: 253 goals
- England national team second all-time top scorer: 53 goals
- Second-most goals for England national team in competitive matches: 37 goals
- Second-most Premier League goals scored for one club: 183 goals for Manchester United
- Most Premier League away goals scored: 94 goals
- Most Premier League seasons reaching double figures in goals: 12
- Youngest player to start a competitive match for England: aged 17 years and 160 days
- Youngest player to score a goal for the England national team: aged 17 years and 317 days (v. Macedonia, 6 September 2003)
- Manchester United all-time top scorer in UEFA club/European competitions: 39 goals
- Manchester United all-time top scorer in FIFA Club World Cup/international competitions: 3 goals
- Third-highest Premier League all-time top scorer: 208 goals
- Fourth-highest Premier League all-time assist-provider: 103 assists
- Only player to have scored at least 200 Premier League goals and provided at least 100 Premier League assists
- Second-most capped England international: 120 caps
- Most capped outfielder for the England national team: 120 caps
- Manchester derby all-time top scorer: 11 goals

=== Manager ===
Individual

- MLS All-Star Coach: 2023

== See also ==
- List of men's footballers with 100 or more international caps
- List of men's footballers with 50 or more international goals
- List of footballers with 100 or more Premier League goals
