= Davy Jones's locker =

Sailor legend

Davy Jones' locker
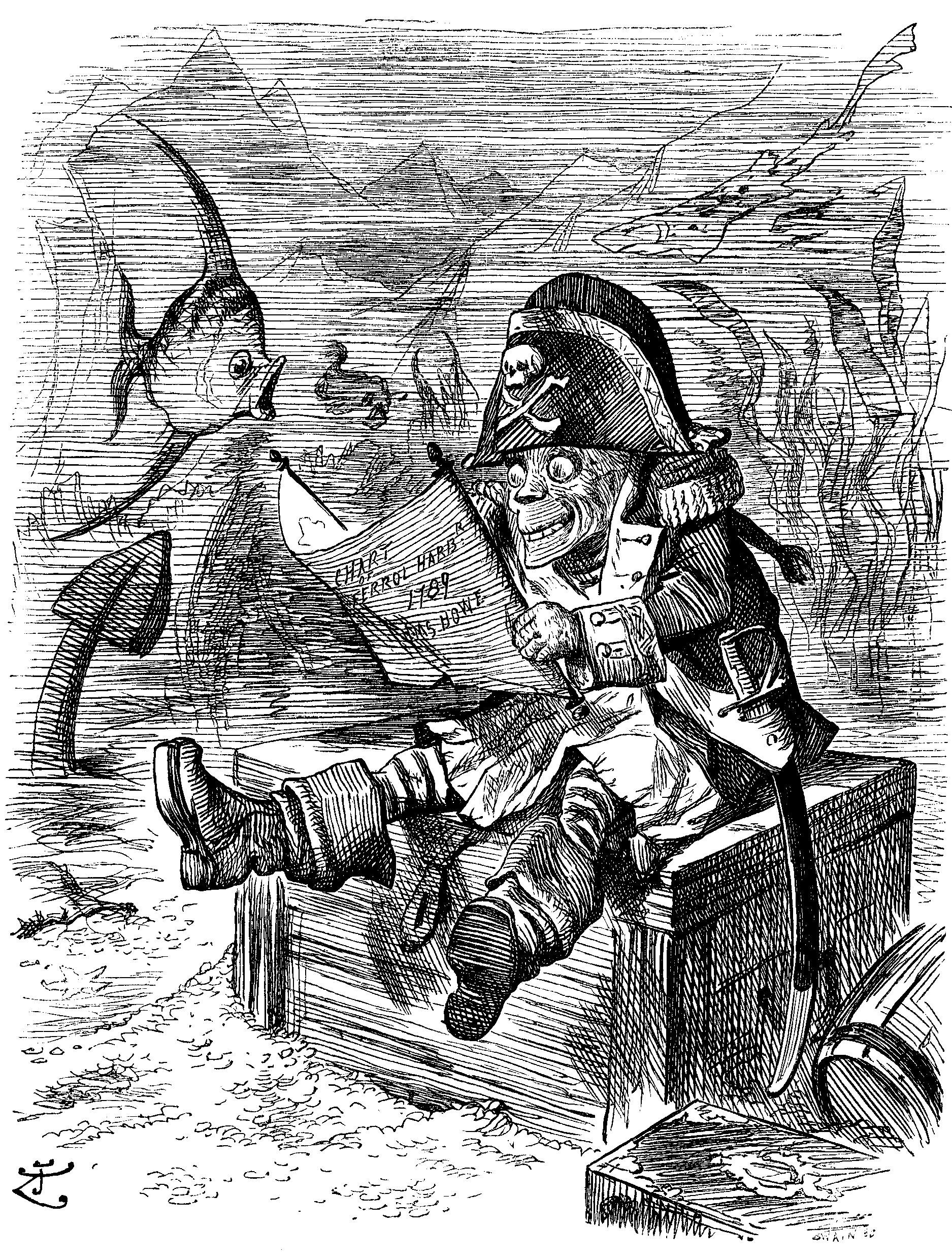
- Davy Jones' Locker, by John Tenniel, 1892
- First appearance: Four Years Voyages of Capt. George Roberts (1726)
- Genre: Nautical folklore

In-universe information
- Type: Euphemism for oceanic abyss, the resting place for sailors drowned at sea.
- Character: Davy Jones

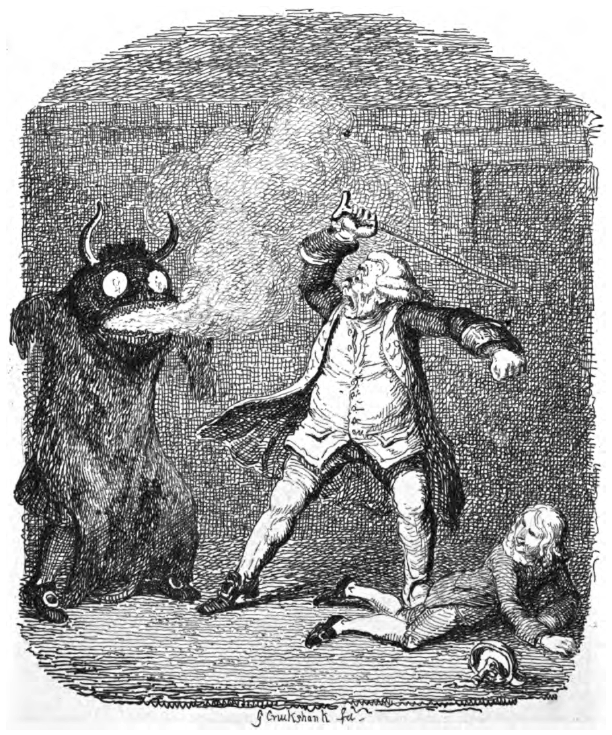
Davy Jones pictured by George Cruikshank in 1832, as described by Tobias Smollett in The Adventures of Peregrine Pickle

Davy Jones' locker is a metaphor for the oceanic abyss, the final resting place of drowned sailors and travellers. It is a euphemism for drowning or shipwrecks in which the sailors' and ships' remains are consigned to the depths of the ocean (to be sent to Davy Jones' Locker).

First used in print in 1726, the name Davy Jones' origins are unclear, with a 19th-century dictionary tracing Davy Jones to a "ghost of Jonah". Other explanations of this nautical superstition have been put forth, including an incompetent sailor or a pub owner who kidnapped sailors.

== History ==
The earliest known reference of the negative connotation of Davy Jones occurs in The Four Years Voyages of Capt. George Roberts, attributed to Daniel Defoe (but likely involving the journal of a real George Roberts), published in 1726 in London.

Some of Loe's Company said, They would look out some things, and give me along with me when I was going away; but Russel told them, they should not, for he would toss them all into Davy Jones's Locker if they did.

And elsewhere in The Four Years Voyages:

But now they had no Goods at all, he believed, having disposed of them all, either by giving them to other Prizes, &c. or heaving the rest into David Jones's Locker (i.e. the Sea).

=== Proposed origins of the tale ===
The origin of the tale of Davy Jones is unclear, and many conjectural or folkloric explanations have been told:

- The satirical 1751 novel The Adventures of Peregrine Pickle contains both the phrase "Davy Jones" and a description of it as a malevolent spirit:

"I’ll be damned if it was not Davy Jones himself: I know him by his saucer-eyes, his three rows of teeth, his horns and tail, and the blue smoak that came out of his nostrils. What does the black-guard, hell’s baby want with me? I’m sure I never committed murder, nor wronged any man whatsomever, since I first went to sea." This same Davy Jones, according to the mythology of sailors, is the fiend that presides over all the evil spirits of the deep, and is often seen in various shapes, perching among the rigging on the eve of hurricanes, shipwrecks, and other disasters, to which a sea-faring life is exposed ; warning the devoted wretch of death and woe.

- The Dictionary of the Vulgar Tongue by Francis Grose, written in 1785 and published in 1811, includes the definitions: "DAVID JONES. The devil, the spirit of the sea: called Necken or Draugr in the north countries, such as Norway, Denmark, and Sweden" and "DAVID JONES' LOCKER. The sea".
- Written within a foreign affairs segment within the newspaper 'Chester Chronicle' in 1791, the term 'Safe in Davy Jones's locker' was used to convey that a person was lost, therefore to be within Davy Jones's locker was to be lost at sea.
- The 1870 and 1895 editions of the Dictionary of Phrase and Fable connect Davy to the West-Indian duppy (duffy) and Jones to biblical Jonah:
  He's gone to Davy Jones' locker, i.e. he is dead. Jones is a corruption of Jonah, the prophet, who was thrown into the sea. Locker, in seaman's phrase, means any receptacle for private stores; and duffy is a ghost or spirit among the West Indian negroes. So the whole phrase is, "He is gone to the place of safe keeping, where duffy Jonah was sent to."
  — E. Cobham Brewer
  The reference to duppy/duffy was deleted in later revisions of Brewer's dictionary.
- David Jones, a real pirate, although not a very well-known one, living on the Indian Ocean in the 1630s. Charles Grey calls him "a truculent rascal ... to whose activities in covering up the evidence of their misdeeds, Sir William Foster is inclined (wrongly) to attribute the origin of the sea phrase Davy Jones's Locker".
- Duffer Jones, a notoriously myopic sailor who often found himself overboard.
- A British pub owner who supposedly threw drunken sailors into his ale locker and then gave them to be drafted on any ship.
- Pinkerton attributes its origin to the Biblical Jonah:

During many years of seafaring life, I have frequently considered the origin of this phrase, and have now arrived at the conclusion that it is derived from the scriptural account of the prophet Jonah. The word 'locker', on board of ship, generally means the place where any particular thing is retained or kept, as "bread locker", "shot locker", "chain locker", &c. In the sublime ode in the second chapter of the Book of Jonah, we find that the prophet, praying for deliverance, described his situation in the following words:—"in the midst of the seas; and the floods compassed me about; the depth closed me round about; the earth with her bars was about me". The sea, then, might not be misappropriately termed by a rude mariner, Jonah's locker—that is, the place where Jonah was kept or confined. Jonah's locker, in time, might be readily corrupted to Jones's locker; and Davy, as a very common Welsh accompaniment of the equally Welsh name, Jones, added, the true derivation of the phrase having been forgotten.

— W. Pinkerton, Notes and Queries: Vol. III, No. 86, page 478, Saturday, June 21. 1851.

- The phrase may have been associated with balladeer and Welsh clergyman David Lloyd, well known for his nautical adventure ballad The Legend of Captain Jones.
- Linguists consider it most plausible that Davy was inspired by Saint David of Wales, whose name was often invoked by Welsh sailors, and Jones by the Biblical Jonah.

== Positive associations ==
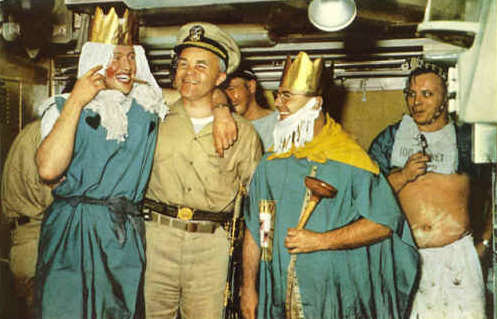
Crossing the equator ceremony (with "Davy Jones" with yellow cape and a plunger as sceptre) aboard the USS Triton, 24 February 1960 as part of the Operation Sandblast cruise

Not all traditions dealing with Davy Jones are fearful. In traditions associated with sailors crossing the Equatorial line, there is a "raucous and rowdy" initiation presided over by those who have crossed the line before, known as shellbacks, or Sons of Neptune. The eldest shellback is called King Neptune, and Davy Jones is to be re-enacted as his first assistant.

== Use in media ==
=== 18th century ===
After 1726's Four Years Voyages, another early description of Davy Jones occurs in Tobias Smollett's The Adventures of Peregrine Pickle, published in 1751:

This same Davy Jones, according to sailors, is the fiend that presides over all the evil spirits of the deep, and is often seen in various shapes, perching among the rigging on the eve of hurricanes:, ship-wrecks, and other disasters to which sea-faring life is exposed, warning the devoted wretch of death and woe.

In the story, Jones is described as having saucer eyes, three rows of teeth, horns, a tail, and blue smoke coming from his nostrils.

=== 19th century ===
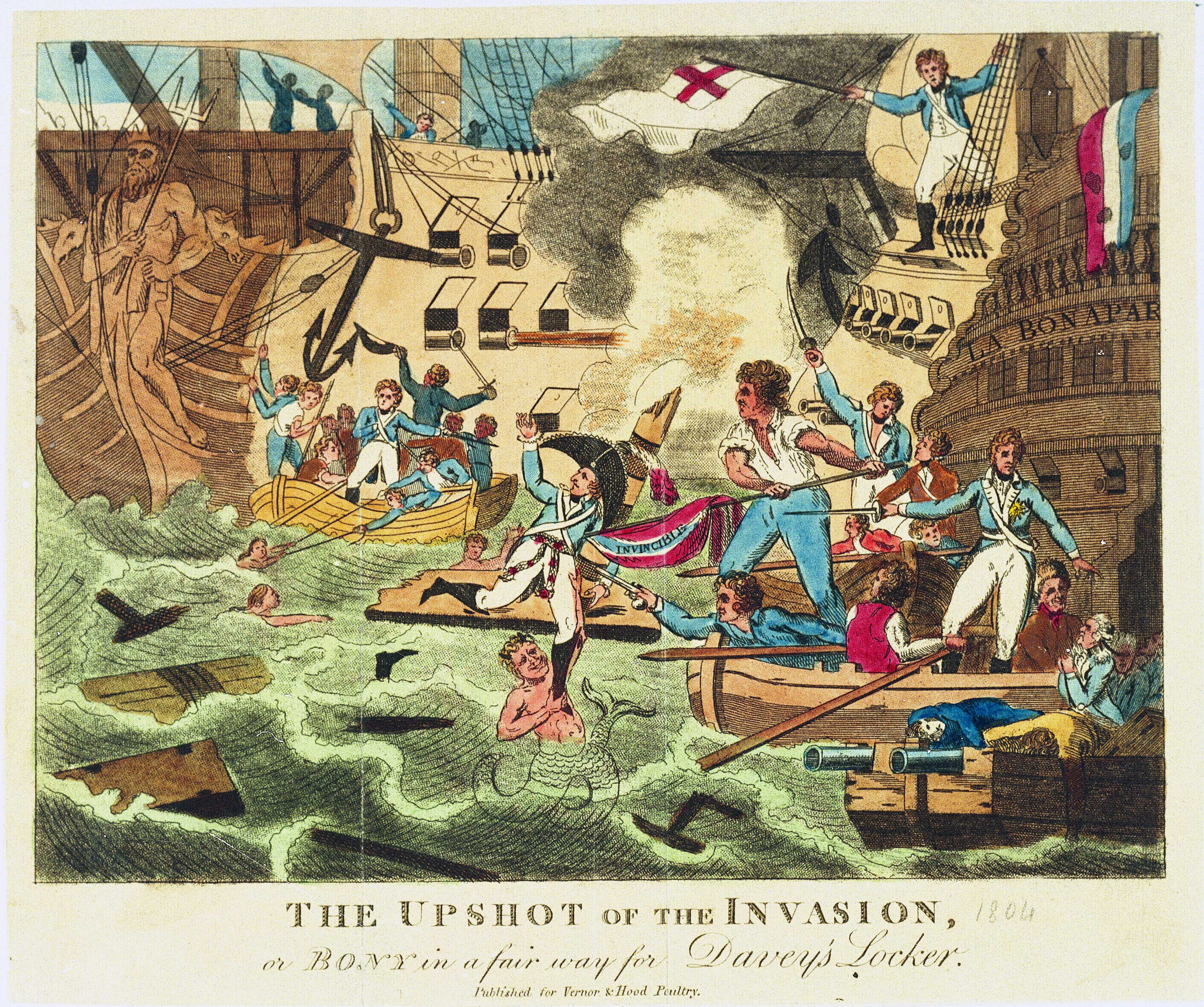
1804 print showing "The Upshot of the Invasion, or Bony in a fair way for Davey's Locker"

in 1812, a musical pantomime 'Davy Jones's Locker, Or Black ey'd Susan' was performed at London's West End theatre; Sans Pareil, known today as Adelphi Theatre.

=== 20th century ===
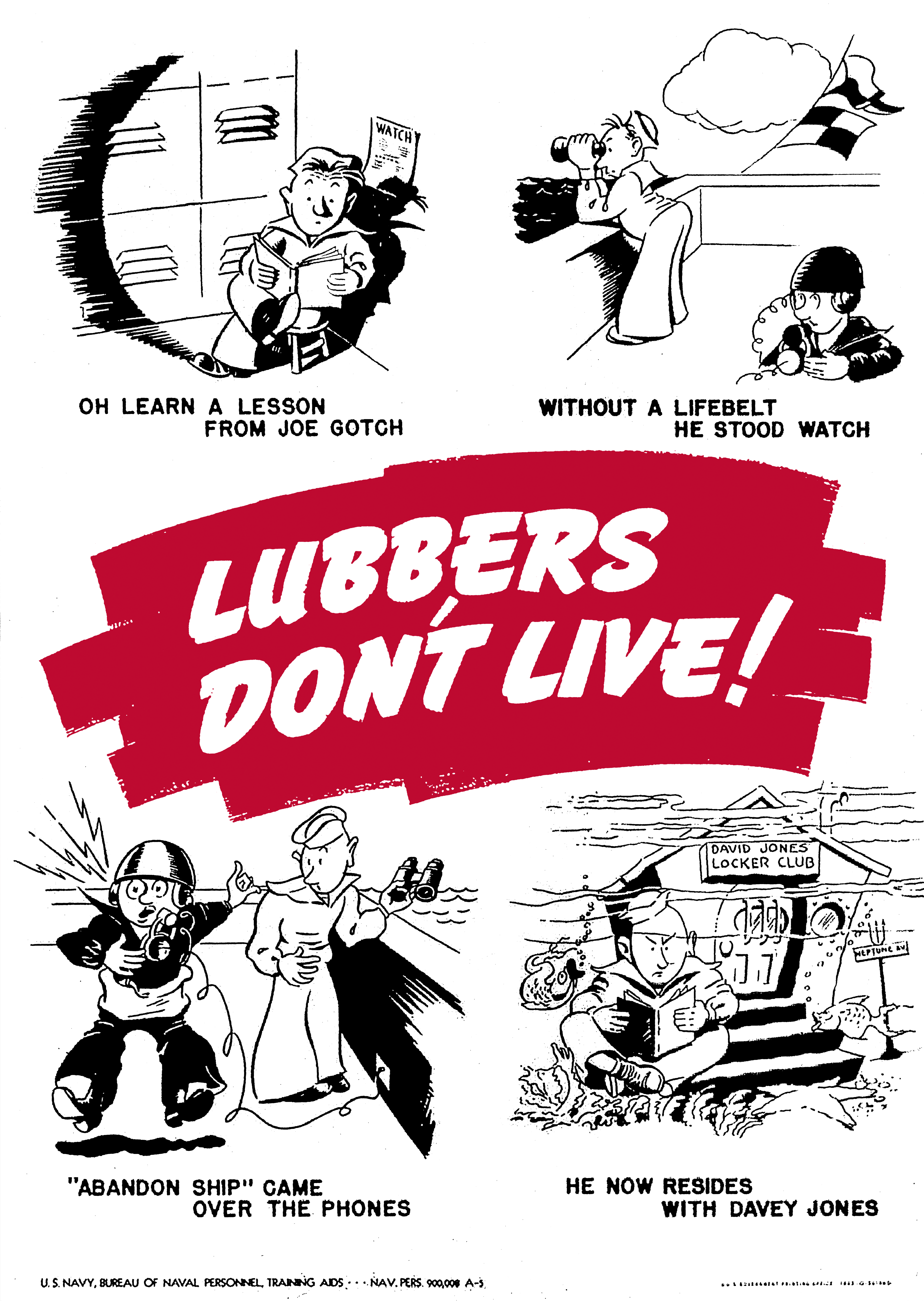
World War II poster makes reference to Davy Jones's Locker. (Note: Caption: Oh learn a lesson from Joe Gotch – Without a lifebelt he stood watch – "Abandon ship" came over the phones – He now resides with Davy Jones) In nautical jargon, a lubber is a clumsy or inexperienced sailor.

In the 1930 cartoon "The Haunted Ship", from the Aesop's Fables series, Davy Jones is depicted as a living skeleton wearing a pirate's bicorne hat.

Raymond Z. Gallun's 1935 science fiction story "Davey Jones' Ambassador" tells of a deep-sea explorer in his underwater capsule who comes in contact on the seabed with a deep-sea culture of underwater creatures.

Theodore Sturgeon's 1938 short story "Mailed Through a Porthole", about a doomed freighter, takes the form of a letter addressed to "Mr. David Jones, Esq., Forty Fathoms".

Davy Jones is a character appearing in Popeye comics authored by Tom Sims and Bela Zaboly between 1939 and 1959. He is depicted as a sea spirit who inhabits the bottom of the ocean as well as his Locker, which is located in a sunken ship.

Tom Lehrer's 1953 album Songs by Tom Lehrer includes the number "The Irish Ballad", in which one of the stanzas contains the lines "She weighted her brother down with stones / And sent him off to Davey Jones."

The 1959 Broadway musical Davy Jones' Locker with Bil Baird's marionettes had a two-week run at the Morosco Theatre.

In the television series The Monkees 1967 episode "Hitting The High Seas", the character Davy Jones (played by musician Davy Jones) receives special treatment while kidnapped in a ship as he claims to be related to "The Original" Davy Jones, his grandfather. The fact that Jones the musician shared a name with the legendary seafarer has itself led to a number of puns swapping the two in the decades that followed. (Note: Musician David Bowie performed and recorded as Davy or Davie Jones – Jones being his real surname – before taking on the stage name Bowie to avoid confusion with The Monkees' singer.)

=== 21st century ===
The concept of Davy Jones was combined with the legend of the Flying Dutchman in the Pirates of the Caribbean film series, in which Davy Jones's locker is portrayed as a purgatory place of punishment for those who crossed Davy Jones. Jones is portrayed as a captain assigned to ferry those drowned at sea to the afterlife before he corrupted his purpose out of anger at his betrayal by his lover, the sea-goddess Calypso. Davy Jones is portrayed as an enigma of the sea, featuring octopus tentacles for a beard and crab claw for a hand.

The phrase has often been referenced comedically in the animated television series SpongeBob SquarePants, particularly by the show's ghostly personification of the Flying Dutchman. "Davy Jones's locker" has made occasional appearances in the cartoon as a literal gym locker used to contain souls and socks. One episode features Davy Jones from The Monkees claim ownership of the locker, as a pun on the pop singer's name.

French singer Nolwenn Leroy recorded a song titled "Davy Jones" for her 2012 album Ô Filles de l'Eau. The English version contains the lines: "Davy Jones, oh Davy Jones / Where they gonna rest your bones / Down in the deep blue sea / Down in the deep blue sea..."

In 2022 it was widely reported as referenced and explained by Mrs Justice Steyn to Rebekah Vardy in the Wagatha Christie trial.

In the manga series One Piece, a character named Davy D. Jones serves as a pivotal yet unseen presence. His descendants include Rocks D. Xebec and series antagonist Marshall D. Teach.

== See also ==
- Fiddler's Green
- Flying Dutchman
- Rán
- Burial at sea
