= List of Michael Sheen performances =

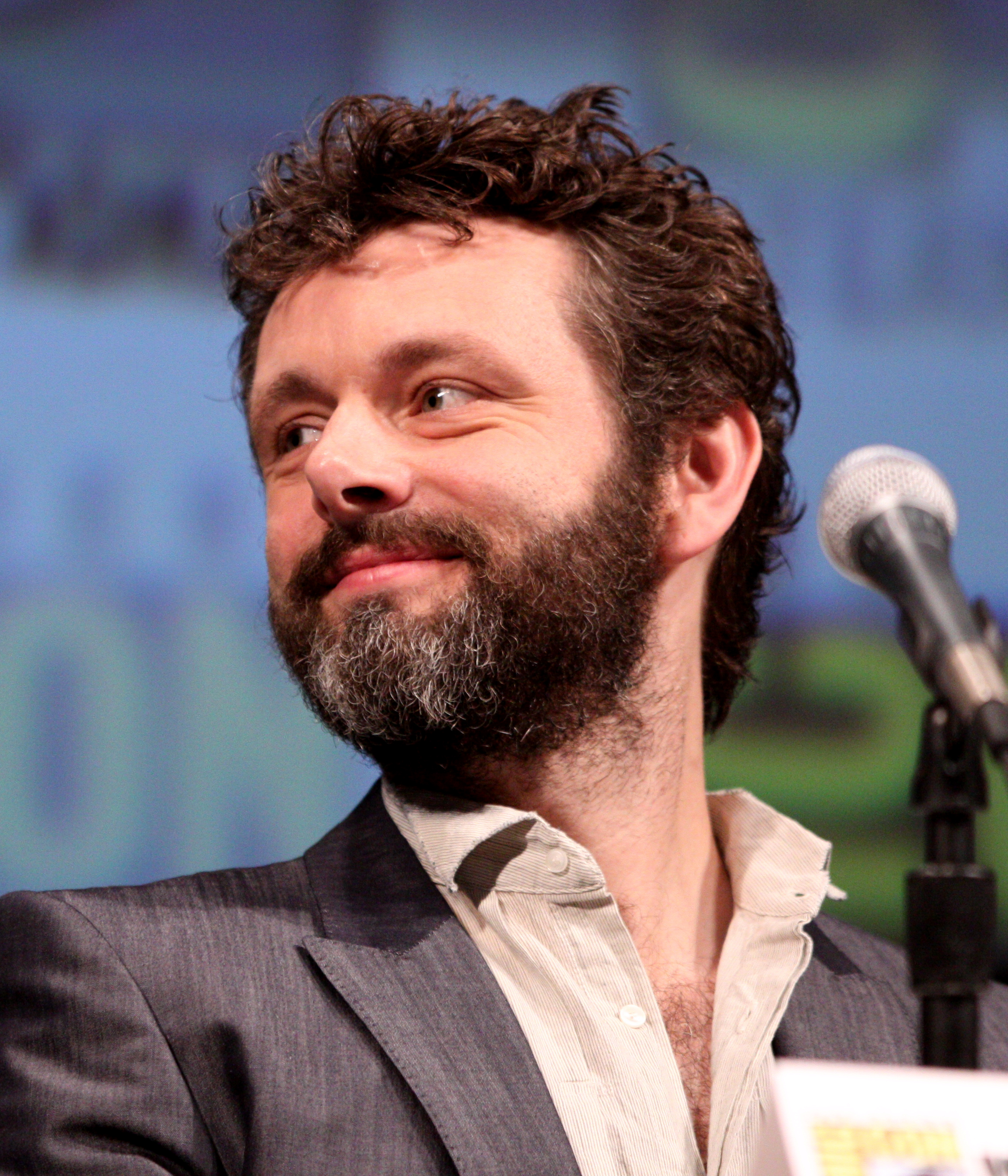
Sheen at San Diego Comic-Con in July 2010

Michael Sheen is a Welsh stage and screen actor. After training at the Royal Academy of Dramatic Art, Sheen made his professional debut in 1991, starring opposite Vanessa Redgrave in When She Danced at the Globe Theatre. He worked mainly in theatre throughout the 1990s and made notable stage appearances in Romeo and Juliet (1992), Don't Fool With Love (1993), Peer Gynt (1994), The Seagull (1995), The Homecoming (1997) and Henry V (1997). His performances in Amadeus at the Old Vic and Look Back in Anger at the National Theatre were nominated for Olivier Awards in 1998 and 1999, respectively.

In the 2000s, while continuing to make sporadic stage appearances, Sheen became known primarily as a screen actor. In 2003, he starred in the film Underworld as Lucian, the leader of the Lycans, a role he had once again in 2006's Underworld: Evolution via archive footage. Also in 2003, he was nominated for a third Olivier Award for his performance in Caligula at the Donmar Warehouse and had a breakthrough performance as the British politician Tony Blair in the television film The Deal. He received a BAFTA Award nomination in 2004 for his work in the ITV drama Dirty Filthy Love. In 2006, Sheen starred as the troubled comic actor Kenneth Williams in BBC Four's Fantabulosa! and came to the attention of an international audience when he reprised his role as Blair in The Queen. Both performances were BAFTA Award-nominated. Sheen received a fourth Olivier Award nomination in 2006 for portraying the broadcaster David Frost in Frost/Nixon at the Donmar Warehouse and he later revisited the role of Frost in the 2008 film adaptation of the play. In 2009, Sheen appeared in two fantasy films, Underworld: Rise of the Lycans and The Twilight Saga: New Moon, and starred as the outspoken football manager Brian Clough in The Damned United.

In the 2010s, Sheen has divided his time between film, television and theatre work. In 2010, he made a four-episode guest appearance in the NBC comedy 30 Rock and was nominated for an Emmy Award for his portrayal of Blair in the HBO film The Special Relationship. He appeared in the science-fiction film Tron: Legacy (2010) and Woody Allen's romantic comedy Midnight in Paris (2011). At Easter 2011, Sheen directed and starred in National Theatre Wales's The Passion, a 72-hour secular passion play staged in his hometown of Port Talbot. From October 2011 until January 2012, Sheen played the title role in Hamlet at the Young Vic.

Sheen has also appeared in many radio productions, particularly in the early years of his career. Notable radio play appearances include Strangers on a Train (1994) opposite Bill Nighy, The Importance of Being Earnest (1995) opposite Judi Dench, Romeo and Juliet (1997) opposite Kate Beckinsale, Troy (1998) opposite Paul Scofield and The Pretenders (2004) opposite, again, Paul Scofield. He has also narrated five novels and presented a series of documentaries for BBC Radio 2 and BBC Radio 4.

== Theatre ==
Year	Title	Role	Director	Theatre	Notes
1991	When She Danced	Alexandros Eliopolos	Robert Allan Ackerman	Globe Theatre, London	
1991	Neon Gravy		James Macdonald	Royal National Theatre, London	Workshop
1992	Romeo and Juliet	Romeo	Greg Hersov	Royal Exchange, Manchester and Tour	Nominated – M.E.N. Theatre Award for Best Actor
1992	A View from the Bridge	Longshoreman	Greg Hersov	Royal Exchange, Manchester and Tour	
1993	The Blind Men	Lamprido	Declan Donnellan	Donmar Warehouse, London and Tour	
1993	Don't Fool With Love	Perdican	Declan Donnellan	Donmar Warehouse, London and Tour	Nominated – Ian Charleson Award
1993	Moonlight	Fred	David Leveaux	Almeida Theatre, London	
1993	Ion	Ion	Nicholas Wright	Royal National Theatre, London	Workshop
1993	Forever Yours, Marie-Lou			Tour in Swansea, Cardiff & London	
1994	Peer Gynt	Peer Gynt	Yukio Ninagawa	Barbican Theatre, London and Tour in Oslo and Tokyo	
1994	Le Livre de Spencer	Spencer Gaveston	Lluís Pasqual	Odéon-Théâtre de l'Europe, Paris	
1994	Charley’s Aunt	Lord Fancourt Babberley	Emil Wolk	Royal Exchange, Manchester	
1995	Look Back in Anger	Jimmy Porter	Greg Hersov	Royal Exchange, Manchester	
1995	The Seagull	Konstantin	Robert Sturua	Theatre Royal, Bath and Tour	
1995	The Dresser	Norman	directed by Sheen	Drum Theatre, Plymouth	
1996	The Ends of the Earth	Daniel	Andrei Şerban	Royal National Theatre, London	
1997	The Homecoming	Lenny	Roger Michell	Royal National Theatre, London	
1997	Badfinger		directed by Sheen	Donmar Warehouse, London	
1997	Gas Station Angel			Duke of York's Theatre, London	Rehearsed reading
1997	Henry V	Henry V	Ron Daniels	Royal Shakespeare Theatre, Stratford Upon Avon	Nominated – Ian Charleson Award
1998–1999	Amadeus	Mozart	Peter Hall	Old Vic, London; Ahmanson Theatre, Los Angeles; Music Box Theatre, Broadway	Nominated – Laurence Olivier Award for Best Supporting Performance; Nominated – Outer Critics Circle Award for Outstanding Actor
1999	Look Back in Anger	Jimmy Porter	Greg Hersov	Royal National Theatre, London	Nominated – Laurence Olivier Award for Best Actor; Nominated – Evening Standard Award for Best Actor
2000	Smithereens			Second Stage Theatre, New York	Workshop
2003	Caligula	Caligula	Michael Grandage	Donmar Warehouse, London	Evening Standard Award for Best Actor; Critics' Circle Theatre Award for Best Actor; Nominated – Laurence Olivier Award for Best Actor
2005	The UN Inspector	Martin Gammon	David Farr	Royal National Theatre, London	
2005	24 Hour Play			Old Vic, London	
2006–2007	Frost/Nixon	David Frost	Michael Grandage	Donmar Warehouse, London & Gielgud Theatre, London; Bernard B. Jacobs Theatre, Broadway	Nominated – Drama League Award for Distinguished Performance; Nominated – Laurence Olivier Award for Best Actor
2009	Betrayal	Robert	Ian Rickson	Royal National Theatre, London	Only two scenes performed as part of a Harold Pinter tribute evening
2011	The Passion	The Teacher	directed by Sheen	National Theatre Wales, Port Talbot	Theatre Award UK for Best Director
2011–2012	Hamlet	Hamlet	Ian Rickson	Young Vic, London	
2020	Faith Healer	Francis Hardy	Matthew Warchus	Old Vic, London	Livestreamed socially distanced performance
2021	Under Milk Wood	Owain Jenkins	Lyndsey Turner	Royal National Theatre, London	
2022	Amadeus	Salieri	Craig Ilott	Sydney Opera House, Sydney	BroadwayWorld Australia - Sydney Awards for Best Performer in a Play
2024	Nye	Aneurin Bevan	Rufus Norris	Royal National Theatre, London; Wales Millennium Centre, Cardiff	
2024	White Rabbit Red Rabbit	Performer	Nassim Soleimanpour	@sohoplace, London	4 October performance
2025	Inside No. 9 Stage/Fright	Guest star	Simon Evans	Wyndham's Theatre, London	Cameo - 8 March (evening) performance
2025	Nye	Aneurin Bevan	Rufus Norris	Royal National Theatre, London; Wales Millennium Centre, Cardiff	Revival of 2024 production
2026	Our Town	Stage Manager	Francesca Goodridge	Swansea Grand Theatre; Venue Cymru, Llandudno; Theatr Clwyd, Mold; Rose Theatre, Kingston upon Thames	Welsh National Theatre production
2026	Owain & Henry	Owain Glyndŵr	co-directed by Sheen and Steffan Donnelly	Wales Millennium Centre, Cardiff	Welsh National Theatre production
2027	Amadeus	Salieri	Jeremy Herrin	New Theatre, Cardiff; Noël Coward Theatre, London	Welsh National Theatre production

== Film ==
Year	Film	Role	Notes
1995	Othello	Lodovico	
1996	Mary Reilly	Bradshaw	
1997	Wilde	Robbie Ross	
2002	Heartlands	Colin	
2002	The Four Feathers	William Trench	
2003	Bright Young Things	Miles Maitland	
2003	Underworld	Lucian	
2003	Timeline	Lord Oliver de Vannes	
2003	The Deal	Tony Blair	
2004	Laws of Attraction	Thorne Jamison	
2004	The Banker	The Banker	Short film; Also executive producer BAFTA Award for Best Short Film
2005	Kingdom of Heaven	Priest	
2005	The Open Doors	Framton Nuttel	Short film; Also executive producer
2005	The League of Gentlemen's Apocalypse	Jeremy Dyson	
2006	Dead Long Enough	Harry Jones	
2006	Underworld: Evolution	Lucian	Archive footage
2006	The Queen	Tony Blair	Kansas City Film Critics Circle Award for Best Supporting Actor; Utah Film Critics Association Award for Best Supporting Actor; Los Angeles Film Critics Association Award for Best Supporting Actor; Toronto Film Critics Association Award for Best Supporting Actor; International Cinephile Society Award for Best Supporting Actor; Nominated – BAFTA Award for Best Actor in a Supporting Role; Nominated – Chicago Film Critics Association Award for Best Supporting Actor
2006	Blood Diamond	Rupert Simmons	
2007	Music Within	Art Honeyman	Nominated – St. Louis Gateway Film Critics Association Award for Best Supporting Actor
2007	Airlock Or How To Say Goodbye In Space	Adam Banton	Short film
2008	Frost/Nixon	David Frost	Film nominated for five Academy Awards; Evening Standard British Film Award for Best Actor; Nominated – London Film Critics Circle Award for British Actor of the Year; Nominated – Screen Actors Guild Award for Outstanding Performance by a Cast in a Motion Picture
2009	Underworld: Rise of the Lycans	Lucian	
2009	The Damned United	Brian Clough	Nominated – Satellite Award for Best Actor - Motion Picture Drama
2009	You're the Boss	Presenter	Documentary
2009	My Last Five Girlfriends	Burnham	
2009	The Twilight Saga: New Moon	Aro Volturi	
2010	Unthinkable	Yusuf / Steven Arthur	
2010	Alice in Wonderland	Nivens McTwisp the White Rabbit (voice)	
2010	Tinker Bell and the Great Fairy Rescue	Dr. Griffiths (voice)	
2010	Tron: Legacy	Castor / Zuse	
2010	The Special Relationship	Tony Blair	Nominated – Primetime Emmy Award for Outstanding Lead Actor – Miniseries or a Movie
2011	Midnight in Paris	Paul Bates	Nominated – Screen Actors Guild Award for Outstanding Performance by a Cast in a Motion Picture; Nominated – Gold Derby Film Award for Ensemble Cast (shared with the entire cast)
2011	Beautiful Boy	Bill Carroll	
2011	Few Options	Florist	
2011	The Twilight Saga: Breaking Dawn – Part 1	Aro Volturi	
2011	Resistance	Tommy Atkins	
2012	The Gospel of Us	The Teacher	Welsh BAFTA Award for Best Actor
2012	Jesus Henry Christ	Slavkin O'Hara	
2012	The Twilight Saga: Breaking Dawn – Part 2	Aro Volturi	Empire Cinemas Alternative Movie Awards for Best Film Villain
2013	Admission	Mark	
2014	The Adventurer: The Curse of the Midas Box	Captain Will Charity	
2014	Kill the Messenger	Fred Weil	
2015	Far from the Madding Crowd	William Boldwood	
2015	Barbados	David	Short film
2016	Alice Through the Looking Glass	Nivens McTwisp the White Rabbit (voice)	
2016	Nocturnal Animals	Carlos	
2016	Norman	Philip Cohen	
2016	Passengers	Arthur	
2016	You Can Never Really Know Someone	Henry	Short film
2017	Home Again	Austen	
2017	Brad's Status	Craig Fisher	
2018	Apostle	Malcolm Howe	Nominated – Welsh BAFTA Award for Best Actor; Nominated – Fright Meter Award for Best Supporting Actor
2018	Slaughterhouse Rulez	"The Bat"	
2019	How to Build a Girl	Sigmund Freud	
2020	Dolittle	Blair Müdfly	
2021	Last Train to Christmas	Tony Towers	
2023	Written in the Stars FIFA World Cup Qatar 2022: A Historic World Cup	Narrator (voice)	FIFA World Cup official documentary
2023	Pouring Water on Troubled Oil	Dylan Thomas (voice)	Poetic archival documentary
2026	You Told Us To Talk About the Weather	Narrator (voice)	Short film
2026	Out There	Shifty Gruff	
2026	Fortitude	Winston Churchill	Post-production
TBA	The Last Disturbance of Madeline Hynde		Post-production

== Television ==
Year	Title	Role	Network	Notes
1993	Gallowglass	Joe	BBC2	
1993	Maigret	Philippe	ITV	Episode: "Maigret and the Night Club Dancer"
1993	In Suspicious Circumstances	William Wright	ITV	Episode: "Candle in the Window"
1993	Sean's Show	James	Channel 4	Series 2, episode 6
1997	The Grand	Thomas Jordon	ITV	Series 1, episode 4
1998	Lost in France	Owen	BBC2	
1998	Animated Epics: Beowulf	Wiglaf (voice)	HBO, BBC, S4C	
1998	Bright Smoke: Michael Sheen Profile	Himself	BBC	Documentary Nominated – BAFTA Cymru for Best Documentary in 1999
1999	Doomwatch: Winter Angel	Angel (voice)	Channel 5	
2003	The Deal	Tony Blair	Channel 4	
2004	Dirty Filthy Love	Mark Furness	ITV	Nominated – British Academy Television Award for Best Actor; Nominated – Royal Television Society Award for Best Actor
2006	Ancient Rome: The Rise and Fall of an Empire	Nero	BBC One	Series 1, episode 2: Nero
2006	H. G. Wells: War with the World	H. G. Wells	BBC Two	
2006	Kenneth Williams: Fantabulosa!	Kenneth Williams	BBC Four	Royal Television Society Award for Best Actor; Nominated – British Academy Television Award for Best Actor
2006	Bremner, Bird & Fortune	David Frost	BBC Four	Series 9, episode 1
2009	A Child’s Christmases in Wales	Narrator (voice)	BBC Four	
2009	Top Gear	Himself	BBC One	Series 14, episode 2
2010	30 Rock	Wesley Snipes	NBC	4 episodes – Season 4, episodes 14, 15, 21 and 22; Nominated – Online Film & Television Association Awards for Best Guest Actor In A Comedy Series
2010	The Special Relationship	Tony Blair	HBO	Nominated – Emmy Award for Outstanding Lead Actor – Miniseries or a Movie; Nominated – Online Film & Television Association Awards for Best Actor in a Motion Picture or Miniseries
2010	Coming Home	Himself	BBC Cymru Wales	Genealogy documentary series Series 5, episode 1
2011	Shooting the Hollywood Stars	Charlie Chaplin	BBC Two	Documentary
2011	Doctor Who	House (voice)	BBC One	Episode: "The Doctor's Wife"
2011	Passion in Port Talbot	Himself	BBC One Wales	Director Rehearsals documentary
2013–16	Masters of Sex	William H. Masters	Showtime	Also producer Nominated – Golden Globe Award for Best Actor – Television Series Drama; Nominated – Satellite Award for Best Actor – Television Series Drama; Nominated – Critics' Choice Television Award for Best Actor in a Drama Series
2014	The Spoils of Babylon	Chet Halner	IFC	2 episodes
2015	Comedy Bang! Bang!	Himself	IFC	Season 4, episode 17
2015	The Spoils Before Dying	Kenton Price	IFC	4 episodes
2015	7 Days in Hell	Caspian Wint	HBO	Television film
2015	Cinemaniacs	Himself	CBBC	Segment: "Michael Sheen: Super Actor" Nominated – International Emmy Award for Best Kids: Factual & Entertainment
2015	Jamie & Jimmy's Friday Night Feast	Himself	Channel 4	Series 2, episode 5
2015	The Great Comic Relief Bake Off	Himself	BBC One	Series 2, episode 3 Won the title of Star Baker
2015	Michael Sheen’s Valleys Rebellion	Himself	BBC Cymru Wales	Documentary Nominated – BAFTA Cymru for Best Presenter Nominated – BAFTA Cymru for Best Single Documentary Nominated – Celtic Media Festival for Torc Award
2015	Have I Got News for You	Himself	BBC One	Series 50, episode 4 Guest presenter
2016	Neil Gaiman: Dream Dangerously	Himself	Vimeo	Documentary
2016	The Green Hollow	Dave Evans	BBC One	Documentary Nominated – BAFTA Cymru for Best Actor
2017	Michael Bolton's Big, Sexy Valentine's Day Special	Carl Flossy	Netflix	Variety special
2017	The Simpsons	William H. Masters (voice)	FOX	Episode: "Kamp Krustier"
2017	Michael Sheen: The Fight For My Steel Town	Himself	BBC Cymru Wales	Documentary BAFTA Cymru for News and Current Affairs
2017	Tate Britain's Great British Walks	Himself	Sky Arts	Documentary Series 1, episode 4: Herman
2018	Animals.	Trotts / Motts (voice)	HBO	2 episodes
2018	To Provide All People	Porter	BBC Cymru Wales	Television film
2019	Wales: Land of the Wild	Narrator	BBC One Wales	Nature documentary
2019	The Good Fight	Roland Blum	CBS All Access	7 episodes
2019	Pobol y Cwm	Dr. Hughes	S4C	Guest role
2019	Celebrity Chase: Soccer Aid Special (spinoff of The Chase)	Himself	ITV	Contestant
2019	Pointless Celebrities	Himself	BBC One	Contestant
2019–2021	There's Something About Movies	Himself	Sky One	4 series Team Captain
2019–2021	Prodigal Son	Dr. Martin Whitly	FOX	Main role
2019–2026	Good Omens	Aziraphale	Amazon Video, BBC Two	Miniseries; Nominated – Saturn Award for Best Supporting Actor in Streaming Presentation; Nominated – Tell-Tale TV Award for Favorite Actor in a Limited Series or TV Movie Tell-Tale TV Award for Favorite Performer in a Sci-fi / Fantasy / Horror Series Nominated – ASTRA Television Award for Best Actor in a Streaming Comedy Series
2020	Quiz	Chris Tarrant	ITV	Three-episode miniseries Nominated – OFTA Television Award for Best Supporting Actor in a Motion Picture or Limited Series; Nominated – Welsh BAFTA Award for Best Actor; Nominated – British Academy Television Award for Best Supporting Actor
2020	Jennifer Saunders' Memory Lane	Himself	ITV	Series 1, episode 1
2020–2022	Staged	Michael	BBC One	20 episode comedy, 3 series Also executive producer
2022	The Sandman	Paul	Netflix	Episode: "Dream of a Thousand Cats"
2022	Vardy v Rooney: A Courtroom Drama	David Sherborne	Channel 4	Main role in two-part drama series
2022	Michael Sheen: Lifting the Lid on the Care System	Himself	BBC One	Documentary
2023	Jonathan Ross' Myths and Legends	Himself	Channel 4	Series 1, episode 2: "Wales"
2023	Best Interests	Andrew	BBC One	Main role Also executive producer Series Mania for Best Actor in International Competition
2024	The Way	Denny Driscoll	BBC One	creator, director and executive producer
2024	The Assembly	Himself	BBC One	One-off factual special for Autism Acceptance Week Nominated – Edinburgh TV Festival Awards for TV Moment of The Year with "Leo has a question for Michael Sheen - The Assembly"
2024	A Very Royal Scandal	Prince Andrew	Amazon Prime Video	
2024	The Wheel	Himself	BBC One	Series 5, episode 4 Celebrity expert
2025	Michael McIntyre's Big Show	Himself	BBC One	Series 8, episode 2 Send to All guest
2025	Michael Sheen's Secret Million Pound Giveaway	Himself	Channel 4	Documentary
2026	My Brother the Minotaur	Mr. Craignelder (voice)	Apple TV	
2026	Buried with Michael Sheen	Himself	BBC Two & BBC One Wales	Two-part documentary
2026	Live from The Lycett Arms	Himself	Channel 4	Series 1, episode 2
2026	The Celebrity Traitors	Himself	BBC One	Series 2 Contestant
2026	House of Games	Himself	BBC Two & BBC iPlayer	Host
TBA	Murderbot	TBA	Apple TV	Season 2
TBA	Ivy Newt	Lucius Newt, King of the Sand Witches (voice)		Upcoming animated series

== Radio, podcasts and audiobooks ==
Year	Title	Voice role	Radio Station / Production Company
1993	Much Ado About Nothing	Claudio	BBC
1994	Sailing with Homer	Jonathan	BBC
1994	Crime and Punishment	Narrator	Naxos AudioBooks
1994	Strangers on a Train	Guy Haines	BBC Radio 4
1994	Great Poets of the Romantic Age	Narrator	Naxos AudioBooks
1995	The Idiot	Narrator	Naxos AudioBooks
1995	The Picture of Dorian Gray	Narrator	Naxos AudioBooks
1995	Dangerous Liaisons	Vicomte de Valmont	Naxos AudioBooks
1995	Alaska	Frank	BBC Radio 4
1995	The Importance of Being Earnest	Jack	BBC Radio 4
1996	The Old Testament	Narrator	Naxos AudioBooks
1996	The Great Poets – John Keats	Narrator	Naxos AudioBooks
1997	Poets of the Great War	Narrator	Naxos AudioBooks
1997	Lady Windermere's Fan	Lord Darlington	Naxos AudioBooks
1997	Romeo and Juliet	Romeo, Director	Naxos AudioBooks
1997	The Great Poets – Samuel Taylor Coleridge	Narrator	Naxos AudioBooks
1997	The West Pier	Gorse	BBC Radio 4
1997	A White Merc With Fins	Narrator	BBC Radio 4
1998	Walton: Henry V	Narrator	Naxos AudioBooks
1998	Troy	Paris	BBC Radio 3
1999	A Lover’s Gift: From Him to Her - poetry anthology	Narrator	Naxos AudioBooks
1999	Oedipus	Oedipus	Naxos AudioBooks
1999	The Essential Dylan Thomas: Poetry and Stories	Narrator	Naxos AudioBooks
1999	Walton: Hamlet/As You Like It	Narrator	Naxos AudioBooks
1999	Hamlet	Hamlet	BBC Radio 3
2004	The Pretenders	Håkon Håkonsson	BBC Radio 3
2005	Stories from Shakespeare	Narrator	Naxos AudioBooks
2007	Salmon Fishing in the Yemen	Narrator	BBC Radio 4
2010	Hello, Good Evening and Welcome: The David Frost Story	Presenter	BBC Radio 2
2010	Kenneth Tynan's Theatre Writings	Presenter	BBC Radio 4
2010	The Richard Burton Legacy	Presenter	BBC Radio 4
2010	Playing the Dane	Presenter	BBC Radio 4
2011	A Month of Sundays	Presenter	BBC 6 Music
2013	The Ocean at the End of the Lane	Narrator	BBC Radio 4
2014	Michael Sheen's Eighties	Presenter	BBC Radio 2
2014	ID10T with Chris Hardwick	Guest	Nerdist Industries Season 2 episode 512
2015	Doug Loves Movies	Guest	Misfit Toys Season 8 episode 881: DC Pierson, Michael Sheen, and Wayne Federman Guest Season 8 episode 856: Michael Sheen, Jonah Ray, and Brett Morgen Guest Season 8 episode 898: Michael Sheen, Sarah Silverman, Scott Aukerman, and More Guest
2016	Doug Loves Movies	Guest	Misfit Toys Season 9 episode 908: Julian McCullough, Michael Sheen, and Greg Proops Guest Season 9 episode 919: Michael Sheen, Natalie "Moriarty" Morales, and Theo Von Guest
2016	My Dad Wrote a Porno	Guest	Acast Footnotes: Michael Sheen
2017	La Belle Sauvage	Reader	Audible
2017	Port Talbot Paradiso	Narrator	BBC Radio Wales
2017	The Unquenchable Thirst Of Dracula	Narrator	BBC Radio 4
2018	Nye Bevan: The Man Who Made the NHS	Presenter	BBC World Service
2018	Jeff Wayne's The War of the Worlds - The Musical Drama	George, The Journalist	Audible
2019	The Secret Commonwealth	Reader	Audible
2019	RHLSTP	Guest	Go Faster Stripe Episode 229
2020	The Sandman	Lucifer	Audible
2021	Brydon &	Guest	Wondery Episode: Brydon & Michael Sheen
2021	Christmas Day with Michael Sheen	Presenter	BBC Radio Wales
2022	Michael Sheen: Margins to Mainstream	Presenter	BBC Radio Wales
2023	People, Just People	Guest	Audible
2023	Second Captains Saturday	Guest	RTÉ Radio 1
2024	When There's A Will, There's A Wake	Guest	Sony Music Entertainment Episode "Here Lies Michael Sheen"
2024	Michael Sheen Gets Into Character	Presenter	BBC Radio 4
2024	Buried: The Last Witness	Hearsay witness	BBC Radio 4
2024	Poetry Please	Guest	BBC Radio 4
2024	RHLSTP	Guest	Go Faster Stripe Episode 540
2025	Facing The Music	Presenter	BBC Radio 3 Episode "Dmitri Shostakovich: Staring Down the Terror"
2025	Scarred For Life	Guest	Absolute Radio Season 3, episode 1
2025	Bluey Book Reads	Reader	Book: "Road Trip"
2025	The Romesh Ranganathan Show	Guest	Ranga Bee Productions Episode 1
2025	Desert Island Discs	Guest	BBC Radio 4
2025	The Rose Field	Reader	Audible

Sheen has appeared in many other productions for BBC Radio 4 and BBC World Service including The Blind Men, The Left Over Heart (Johnny), The Life of Christ and Wiglaf. However, the broadcast dates of these productions are unknown.

== Videos ==
Music video credits
Year	Artist(s)	Song	Ref.
2010	Manic Street Preachers	"(It's Not War) Just the End of Love"	
2011	Terema Wainwright and Alex Warren	"Newport (Ymerodraeth State of Mind)" parody version of the 2009 "Empire State of Mind"	
2020	Kelly Lee Owens featuring John Cale	"Corner Of My Sky"	

=== Public information film ===
- Why is the COVID-19 vaccine so safe? for NHS Wales

== Writings ==
=== Articles written by Michael Sheen ===
- CHARTIST MURAL: An open letter to the people of Newport by Michael Sheen – South Wales Argus (2013)
- Michael Sheen on the magic of Dylan Thomas – The Telegragh (2014)
- Michael Sheen: The tyranny of mere wealth is destroying our democracy – New Statesman (2015)
- Five Years of War and Heartbreak: Why We All Must Do More to Keep Syria's Children Safe – HuffPost (2016)
- UK Must Act Now to Protect the Children of Calais and Dunkirk From the Horror of Exploitation – HuffPost (2016)
- So... – HuffPost (2016)
- We Must End Exploitative Lending Practices And Make Credit Fair For Those Who Need it – HuffPost (2018)
- How one goal inspired Michael Sheen to bring the Homeless World Cup to Wales – The Big Issue (2019)
- Why the creative industries need to do more to offer others a writing chance – New Statesman (2021)
- Michael Sheen: We are a nation in search of a story – New Statesman (2022)
- “I tried to give Britain a different narrative”: Tony Blair and Michael Sheen in conversation – New Statesman (2022)
- Michael Sheen: I broke down hearing kids’ care stories – BBC News (2022)
- Michael Sheen: Why Kemi Badenoch is wrong about Port Talbot – New Statesman (2024)
- Michael Sheen and the Daily Mirror give working class authors 'A Writing Chance' – Daily Mirror (2025)

=== Books ===
==== Foreword ====
- for Assassinated Beauty: Photographs of Manic Street Preachers by photographer Kevin Cummins (2014). London: Faber & Faber, 2014. ISBN 978-0571312139.
- for Render the Chartists Defenceless: John Frost's Voyage with Dr McKechnie to Van Diemen's Land in 1840 by Les James (2015).
- for Pulling Together: A snapshot of the first 70 years of the NHS in Swansea Bay and Bridgend by ABMU Health Board (2018).
- for Invisible Britain: Portraits of Hope and Resilience (2018). Published by: Bristol University Press, Policy Press.
- for The Devil At Home (2018) by Rachel Williams. Published by Ebury Press.
- for Sweet Tooth Book One by Jeff Lemire (2019)
- for The Welsh Way: Essays on Neoliberalism and Devolution (2021)
- for The Mab (2022)– a retelling of 11 stories from the Mabinogion by Matt Brown and Eloise Williams. Published by Unbound. ISBN 1-800-18115-9, ISBN 978-1-8001-8115-1
- for Do It Yourself: Making Political Theatre by Common/Wealth (2025). Published by Manchester University Press.
- for The Last Witness: One Man's Fight to Expose a Chemical Contamination Scandal, and the Conspiracy to Silence Him (2026) by Dan Ashby and Lucy Taylor. Published by Blink Publishing. ISBN 1-785-12931-7, 978-1-7851-2931-5

==== Authored work(s) ====
- A Home for Spark the Dragon (2025), picture book co-written with Jess Webb and illustrated by Sarah Massini in association with Shelter. Published by Puffin Books. ISBN 978-0-241-70543-8.

=== Speeches ===
- NHS Speech at the "People's March for the NHS" in Tredegar (2015)
- Aneurin Bevan Lecture at Hay Festival (2017)
- Annual Raymond Williams Memorial Lecture (2017)
- Gender equality speech at the March4Women by CARE International UK (2018)
- Michael Sheen speaks out against domestic abuse at SUTDA (Stand Up To Domestic Abuse) (2021)
- Michael Sheen: The magic of a creative career/Levelling the Cultural Playing Field – TEDxSoho (2022)
- Impromptu motivational speech for the Wales national football team ahead of the 2022 FIFA World Cup (2022)
