= Vardy v Rooney: A Courtroom Drama =

- Genre: Courtroom drama
- Written by: Chris Atkins
- Directed by: Oonagh Kearney
- Starring: Natalia Tena; Chanel Cresswell; Michael Sheen; Simon Coury; Dion Lloyd; Georgiana Neilson-Toy; Marci Nagyszokolyai
- Music by: Kieran Kiely
- Country of origin: United Kingdom
- Original language: English
- No. of series: 1
- No. of episodes: 2

Production
- Executive producer: Tom Popay
- Producer: Catherine Donohoe
- Cinematography: Evan Barry
- Editor: Julian Ulrichs
- Production company: Chalkboard

Original release
- Network: Channel 4
- Release: 21 December – 22 December 2022

Vardy v Rooney: A Courtroom Drama is a Channel 4 two-part courtroom drama based on the Wagatha Christie events and subsequent high-profile court case.

== Premise ==
The mini series recreates the English High Court defamation case between the two figures Rebekah Vardy and Coleen Rooney from 2022, with the focus on the opposing legal teams. The case arose after Rooney accused Vardy of leaking posts from her private Instagram account to The Sun newspaper resulting in Vardy suing Rooney for libel.

== Cast ==
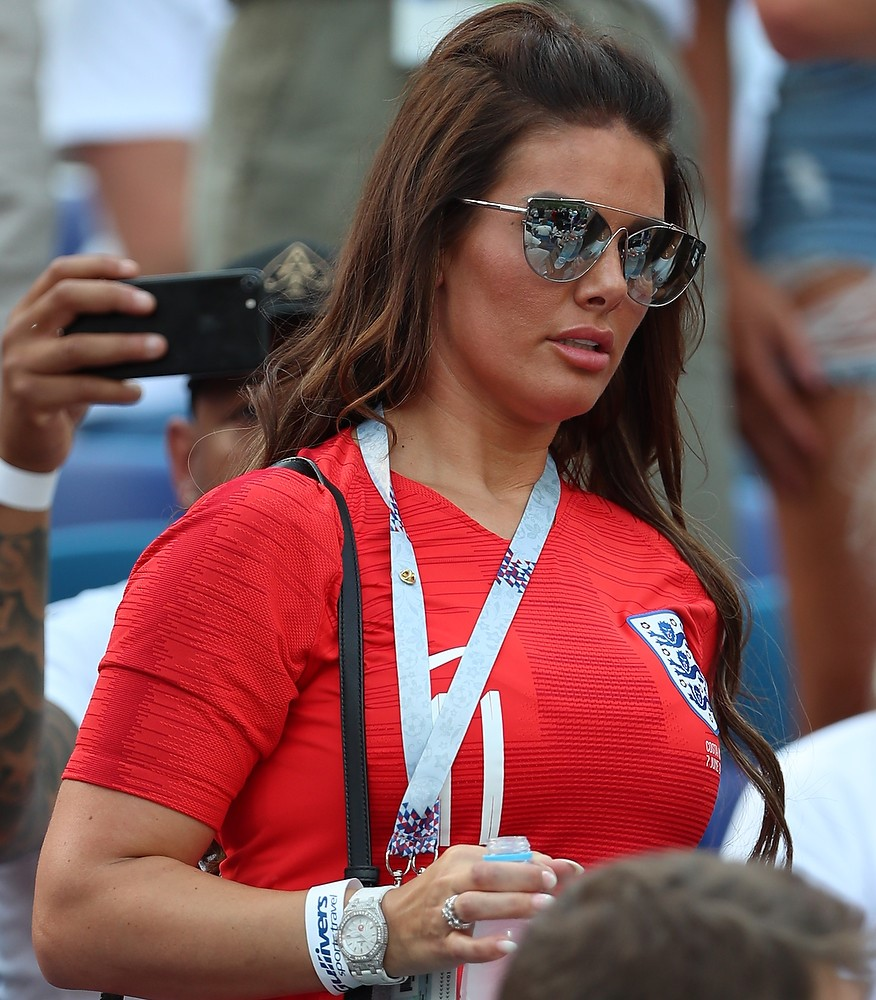
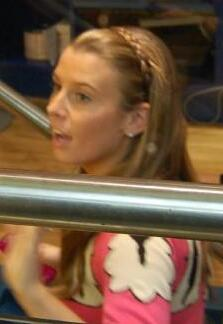
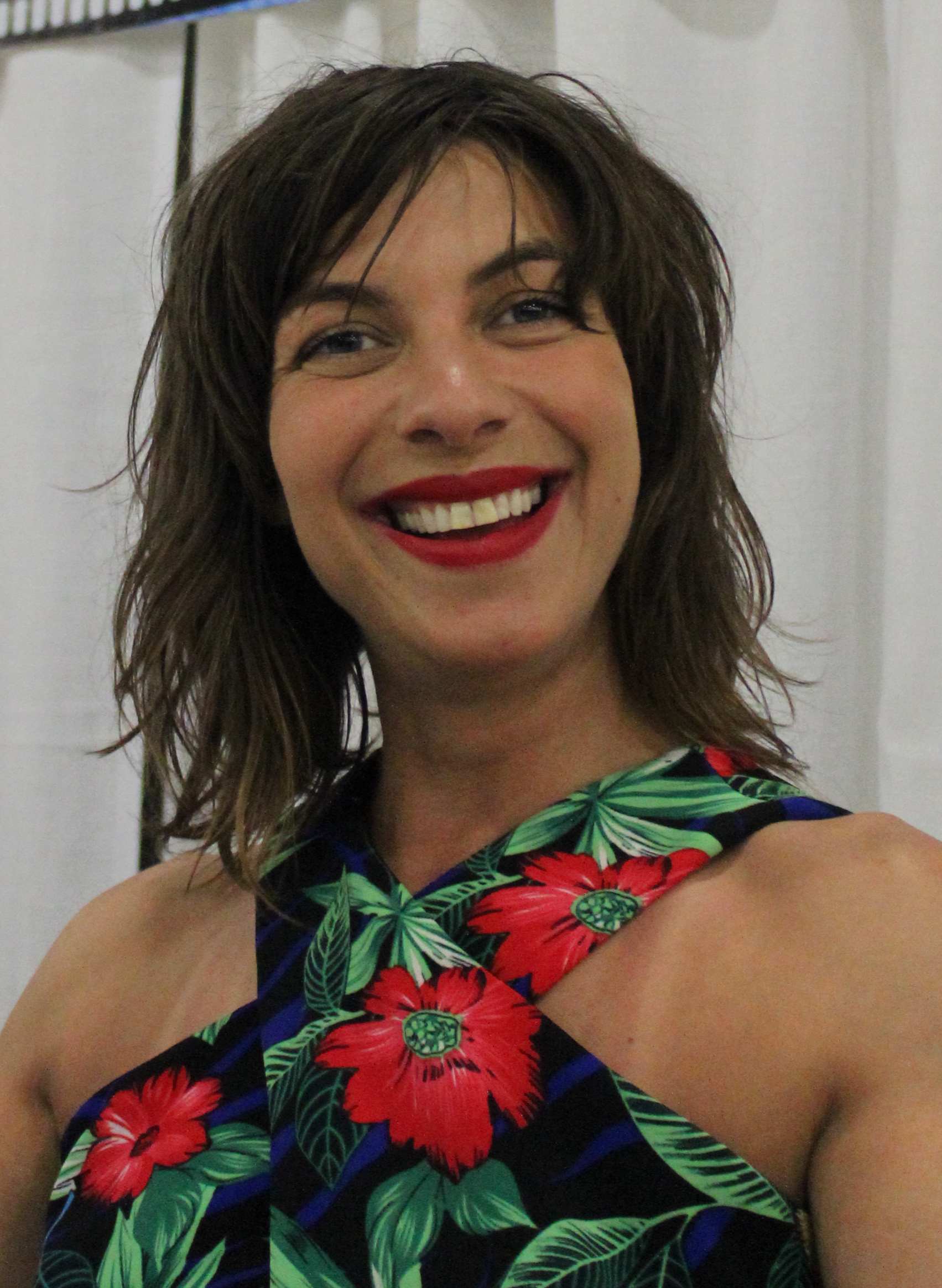
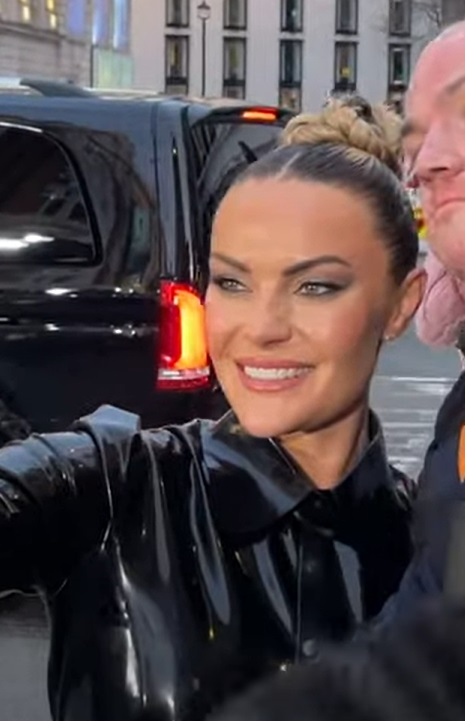
Rebekah Vardy and Coleen Rooney are portrayed by Natalia Tena and Chanel Cresswell respectively.
- Natalia Tena as Rebekah Vardy
- Chanel Cresswell as Coleen Rooney
- Michael Sheen as barrister David Sherborne
- Simon Coury as barrister Hugh Tomlinson
- Dion Lloyd as footballer Wayne Rooney
- Georgiana Neilson-Toy as High Court Judge Mrs. Justice Steyn
- Marci Nagyszokolyai as footballer Jamie Vardy

== Production ==
In July 2022 it was announced that Channel 4 would produce a 2-part drama based on the events of the high-profile trial. Vardy v Rooney: A Courtroom Drama, directed by Oonagh Kearney, which would recreate courtroom scenes using verbatim court transcripts against analysis from the media.

== Release ==
The series aired on 21 December 2022 on Channel 4 in the UK.

The show will air in Ireland on Virgin Media Two on 23 March 2026

== Reception ==
Year	Award	Category	Nominee	Result	Ref.
2023	Broadcasting Press Guild	Best Drama Mini Series	Vardy v Rooney: A Courtroom Drama	Nominated	
