= George Roberts (mariner) =

British mariner

- Occupation: Mariner

George Roberts (fl. 1721–1728) was a British mariner. His story was told in The Four Years Voyages of Capt. George Roberts; Being a Series of Uncommon Events, which Befell him in a Voyage to the Islands of the Canaries, Cape de Verde, and Barbadoes.

== Dictionary of National Biography entry ==
Roberts was the reputed author of ‘The Four Years' Voyages of Capt. George Roberts; being a Series of uncommon Events which befell him in a Voyage to the Islands of the Canaries, Cape de Verde, and Barbadoes … written by himself’ (8vo, 1726). According to this work, Roberts, after having been engaged for several years in the Guinea trade as captain of a ship, engaged himself in 1721 as chief mate for a voyage to Virginia, touching at Madeira, the Canaries, and Barbados. At Barbados, however, as the result of a difference of opinion with his captain, he fitted out a small sloop, in which he undertook a voyage to Guinea; but, being captured by pirates, who cleared the sloop out and detained his men, he was sent adrift, without sails, without provisions, and with no shipmates but a boy and a child. After various difficulties, the sloop was finally wrecked on the unfrequented island of St. John, one of the Cape Verd Islands, where Roberts remained two years, and got back to England in June 1725. It is suggested (Wilson, Life of Defoe, iii. 543) that the narrative is fictitious, and was written by Daniel Defoe, and this suggestion has been adopted in the British Museum ‘Catalogue.’ It seems unauthorised and unnecessary. The style is rather that of some humble and incompetent imitator of Defoe, whose story is very probably based on fact. No reason can be alleged for doubting the existence of Roberts or the substantial truth of the narrative. Watt, whom Allibone follows, seems to identify Roberts with a Mr. Roberts who was shipwrecked in 1692, and whose story of the disaster is published in William Hacke's ‘Collection of Original Voyages’ (London, small 8vo, 1699); but Mr. Roberts, commander and part owner of the vessel wrecked in 1692, can scarcely have been less than sixty in 1722; whereas George Roberts is described as a man of about thirty-five. William Lee (Life of Defoe, &c.) makes no mention of Roberts's narrative, thus tacitly denying Defoe's connection with it.

== History ==
Thomas Astley’s 1745 New General Collection of Voyages and Travels and a similar 1778 travelogue collection both treated Four Years as a genuine account by Roberts, calling his description of the Cape Verde Islands "the only good Account of them (that we know of) extant in any Language."

A majority of Defoe scholars in the 19th and early 20th centuries either denied Defoe as the author or, as Laughton suggestged in the Dictionary, assumed there was a real Roberts whose journal was edited and expanded by another author, Defoe or otherwise. Defoe biographer William Peterfield Trent called Four Years "the dull record of the experiences of a real seaman" and in 1916 wrote that "one willingly accepts the theory that there was a real Captain Roberts who was helped by Defoe to put his notes and recollections into shape for publication."

In 1939 John Robert Moore published Defoe in the Pillory, arguing for a major expansion of the Defoe canon; he called Four Years "clearly a work of fiction based (like all Defoe's fiction) on a considerable amount of fact." Subsequent 20th century scholars accepted Moore's attribution until P. N. Furbank's 1994 Defoe De-Attributions refuted many of Moore's claims, and quoted Trent to reassign Four Years to Roberts himself, with Defoe as a possible editor.

Subsequent research showed that many of the events and people from Roberts' narrative were real, even if the dialogue may have been invented. More importantly, Roberts was real: newspapers such as the London Evening Post, the Daily Journal, and the St. James’ Evening Post recorded his comings and goings on various voyages, including trips back to the Cape Verde Islands.
