= David Sherborne =

Lawyer and criminal barrister

David Alexander Sherborne is a British media barrister.

His high-profile cases have included the representation of Michael Douglas, Catherine Zeta-Jones and OK (magazine) in their suit against Hello! (magazine) for publishing unauthorised pictures of their wedding; getting Amy Winehouse, Cheryl Cole, Lily Allen, Harry Styles and Sienna Miller injunctions against certain paparazzi; and representing the ‘core participants’ in the Leveson Inquiry, including the McCanns, the Dowler family, JK Rowling and Hugh Grant". From 2023 onwards, Sherborne has represented the Prince Harry against the Mirror Group and other UK newspapers.

== Early life ==
Sherborne is the son of a KC who practised as a criminal barrister. He was educated at UCS Hampstead and at Oxford.

== Career ==
Sherborne was called to the bar in October 1992, specialising like his father (b.1930) in criminal law.

By 2003 Sherborne had changed disciplines to civil law. He is part of 5RB chambers, "a leading set of media and communications law barristers [who] represented Johnny Depp in his libel suit against The Sun" newspaper.

=== Significant cases ===
Sherborne played a significant role in the Wagatha Christie 2022 trial, where he successfully represented Coleen Rooney in a libel action brought by Rebekah Vardy. He drew attention to missing mobile phone communication evidence, declaring the phone to be "in Davy Jones's locker", requiring the judge to explain to Vardy the meaning of the phrase.

In 2011, Sherborne appeared on behalf of the victims of phone hacking in the Leveson Inquiry. He raised eyebrows by dating Lord Leveson's junior counsel, Carine Patry Hoskins. Following a bar complaint from a serving MP, they were cleared of professional mis-conduct by the Bar Standards Board. Parliamentary figures revealed Sherborne received £218,606 for nearly eighteen-months of fact checking.

In 2015, he appeared for victims in a phone hacking action against Trinity Mirror.

In 2023, he appeared in the High Court on behalf of the Duke of Sussex and others against Mirror Group Newspapers (MGN) for breaches of privacy. In December 2023, the court awarded significant damages to Prince Harry against MGN. In February 2024, Sherborne told the High Court that Harry had settled the remainder of his claim with MGN. The publisher agreed to pay Harry substantial additional damages and cover his legal costs, with an interim payment of £300,000.

=== Recognition ===
In December 2023, the Times newspaper named Sherborne as their "Lawyer of the Week" and 5RB chambers website acknowledged the accolade.

In 2022 Channel 4 broadcast Vardy v Rooney: A Courtroom Drama. Actor Michael Sheen was cast in the role of Sherborne in the two-part legal drama.

== Personal life ==
Sherborne has been married twice, both ending in divorce. He is distantly related to accountant Michael Berman of Borehamwood.
