= The Sprig of Thyme =

Traditional song

Song
- Genre: English folk music
- Songwriter: Traditional

"The Sprig of Thyme", "The Seeds of Love", "Maiden’s Lament", "Garners Gay", "Let No Man Steal Your Thyme" or "Rue" (Roud 3) is a traditional British and Irish folk ballad that uses botanical and other symbolism to warn young people of the dangers in taking false lovers. The song was first documented in 1689 and the many variants go by a large number of titles.

== History ==
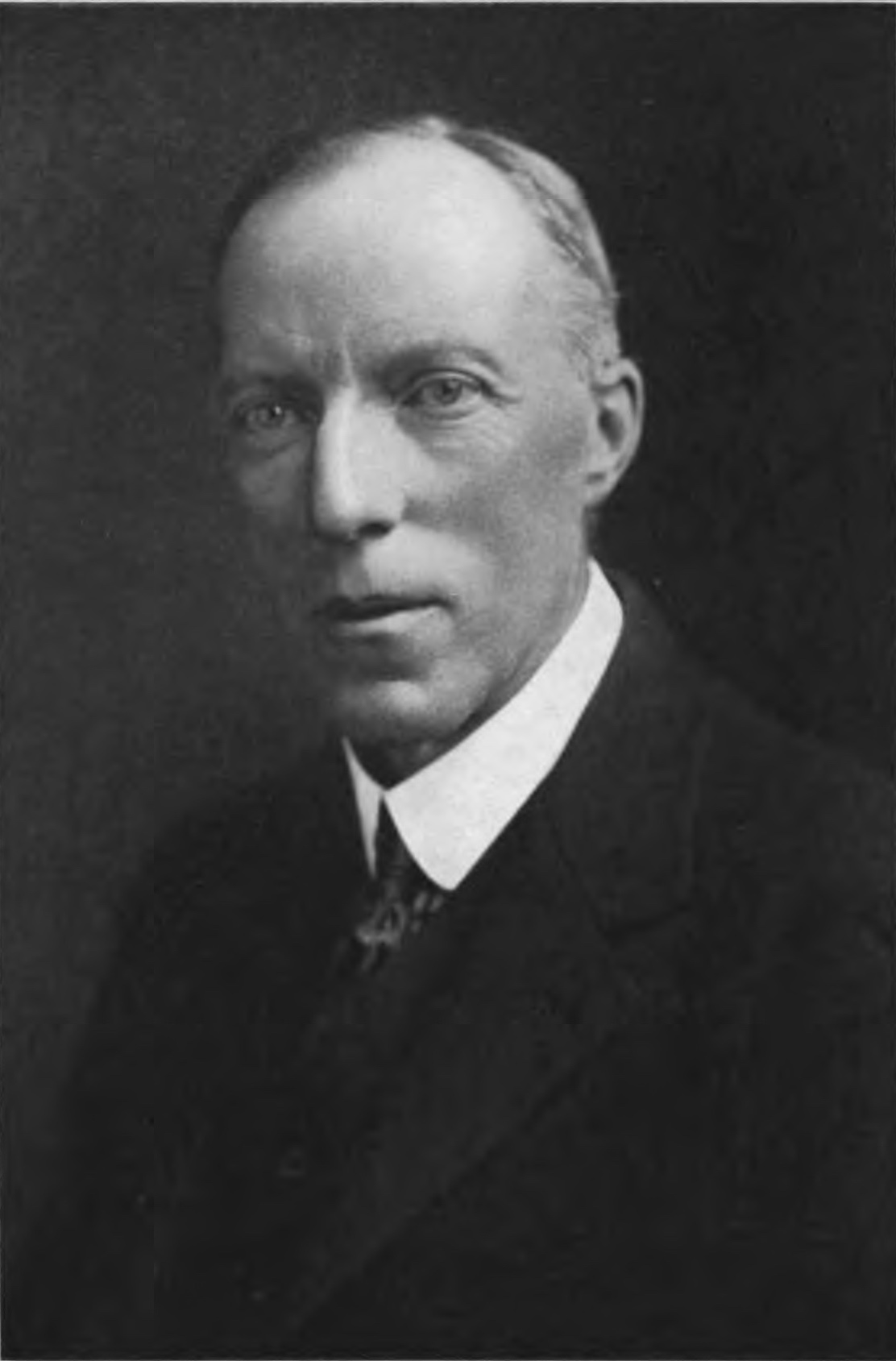
Cecil Sharp, 1916

In Thomas Dunham Whitaker's History of the Parish of Whalley, it is claimed that around the year 1689, a woman named Mrs. Fleetwood Habergam “undone by the extravagance, and disgraced by the vices of her husband,” wrote of her woes in the symbolism of flowers; however, the folklorist Cecil Sharp doubted this claim. The versions allegedly written by Habergram would have been the "Seeds of Love" variant; The "Sprig of Thyme" / "Let No Man Steal Your Thyme" variant is probably older than the "Seeds of Love" variant; it has a more modal, sad melody with abstract and reflective lyrics.

The Seeds of Love, sung by the gardener John England, was the first folk song Cecil Sharp ever collected while he was staying with Charles Marson, vicar of Hambridge, Somerset, England, in 1903. Maud Karpeles wrote about this occasion in her 1967 autobiography:

Cecil Sharp was sitting in the vicarage garden talking to Charles Marson and to Mattie Kay, who was likewise staying at Hambridge, when he heard John England quietly singing to himself as he mowed the vicarage lawn. Cecil Sharp whipped out his notebook and took down the tune; and then persuaded John to give him the words. He immediately harmonised the song; and that same evening it was sung at a choir supper by Mattie Kay, Cecil Sharp accompanying. The audience was delighted; as one said, it was the first time that the song had been put into evening dress.

== Synopsis ==
In one version of Maiden’s Lament, the narrator tells her audience to keep their gardens fair and not to let anyone steal their thyme. Once, she had a sprig of thyme but a gardener’s son came with a red rose, a blue violet and some bitter rue. He stole the thyme and left only rue, with its "running root", growing in its place. Her parents were angry but she will cut the head off the rose and plant a willow for all to see. There is many a "dark and cloudy morn brings forth a pleasant day" and "there are fine boats sailing here".

In a version of Let No Man Steal Your Thyme, she wishes she were in her lover’s arms but she tells false men not to give her cause to complain about the grass underfoot being "trodden down" – in time, it will rise again.

In some versions of Garners Gay, the narrator plucks up all rue and plants a sturdy oak in its place with the hope that it will grow strong and remain as true as the stars do to the sky.

Other plants are mentioned in other versions.

== Lyrics ==
The first three verses of a broadside printed between 1855 and 1858 in Manchester and Leeds ("Sprig of Thyme" variant):

Come all you pretty fair maids,

That's just in your prime,

I would have you weed your gardens clear,

Let no one steal your thyme.

I once had a sprig of thyme,

It prospered both night and day,

By chance there came a false young man,

And he stole my thyme away.

Thyme is the prettiest flower,

That grows under the sun,

It's thyme that brings all things to an end,

So now my time runs on.

The first two verses of a broadside printed between 1819 and 1844 in London ("Seeds of Love" variant):

I sewed the seeds of love it was all in the spring,

In April, May, and June likewise,

When small birds they do sing,

My gardens well planted with flowers every where,

I had not the liberty to chuse for myself,

The flower that I loved so dear.

The gardener he stood by I asked him to chuse for me

He chus'd me the violet the lilly and pink,

But those I refused all three,

The violet I forsook because it fades so soon,

The lilly and the pink I did o'erlook,

And I vowed I'd stay till June.

== Commentary ==
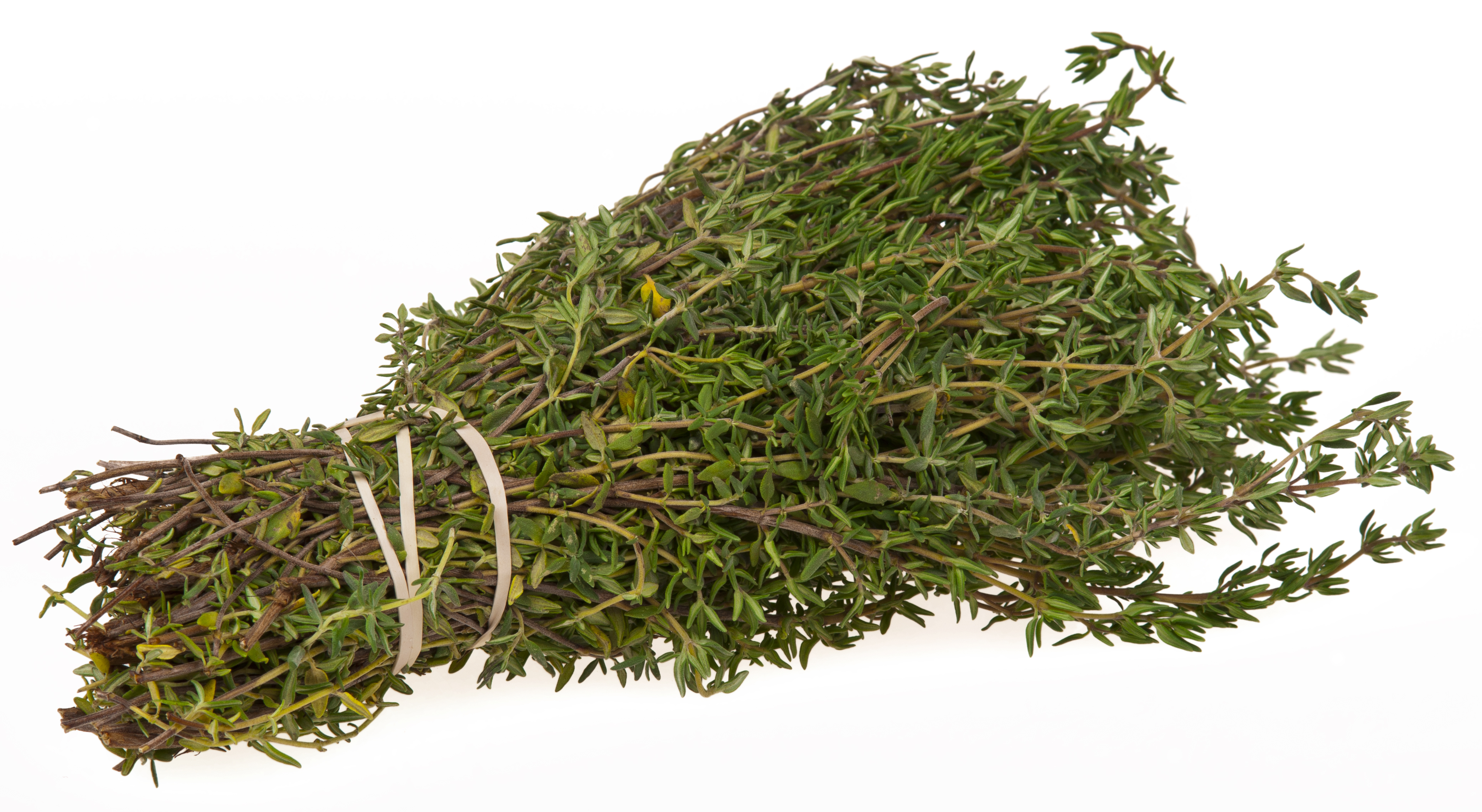
Bundle of thyme

The representative symbolism is as follows:

- "Thyme" – time and, to an extent, virginity
- "Red Rose" – romantic love, lust or "wanton passion"
- "Violet" – modesty
- "Willow" – sorrow and despair
- "Rue" – regret
- "Oak" – strength, loyalty

== Traditional recordings ==
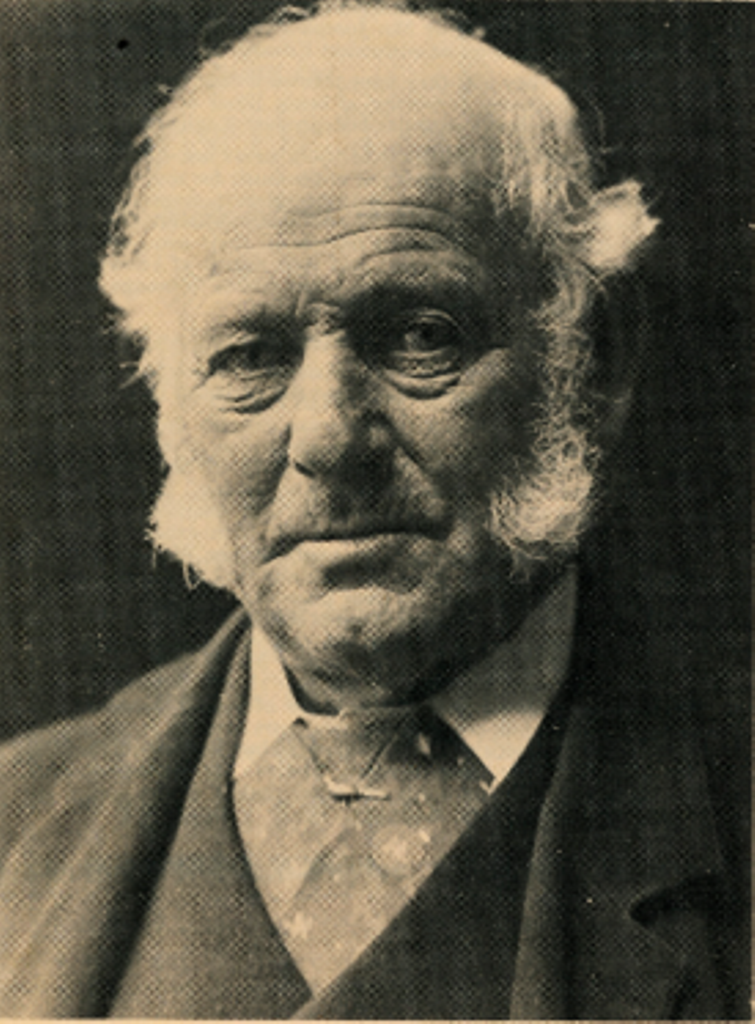
Joseph Taylor (1833-1910)

Many traditional singers have been recorded singing different variants of the song,

Joseph Taylor of Saxby-All-Saints, Lincolnshire was recorded singing "The Sprig of Thyme" by Percy Grainger in 1906; the recording can be heard on the British Library Sound Archive website. Other traditional English singers who performed the song include Fred Jordan of Ludlow, Shropshire, England, and George "Pop" Maynard, whose recording is also available via the British Library Sound Archive.

A version performed by Patrick Green of Ballinalee, Co. Longford, Ireland may have been the ultimate source of several popular recordings including that of Pentangle.

Despite its popularity in the British Isles, the song barely reached North America. Jean Ritchie sang a traditional version to Alan Lomax in 1949 which is available online; however she most likely learnt it from a version collected by Cecil Sharp.

== Popular recordings ==
- Jean Redpath recorded "Rue" on her 1962 Prestige album "Skipping Barefoot Through the Heather".
- Anne Briggs recorded a version of Let No Man Steal Your Thyme (1963), which is included on A Collection and is used as the ending theme for the 2017 Canadian drama television miniseries Alias Grace.
- Kathy and Carol recorded A Sprig of Thyme for their 1965 album Kathy and Carol (Elektra EKL-289).
- Pentangle recorded "Let No Man Steal Your Thyme" on their 1968 debut The Pentangle.
- Shelagh McDonald recorded "Let No Man Steal Your Thyme" on Album (1970); the song was re-released on 2005's Let No Man Steal Your Thyme.
- Foster and Allen recorded A Bunch of Thyme as a single in 1979 and released an album of the same name in 1980.
- Roberts and Barrand recorded "Garners Gay" on their 1983 Live at Holstein's!
- Jim Moray performed Seeds Of Love on his 2003 album Sweet England
- Josienne Clarke and Ben Walker recorded "Let No Man Steal Your Thyme" on their 2014 album Nothing Can Bring Back The Hour.
- Carey Mulligan and Michael Sheen performed a version of Let No Man Steal Your Thyme in the 2015 film adaptation of Far From The Madding Crowd.
- Cassie and Maggie MacDonald recorded “Let No Man Steal Your Thyme” on their 2016 recording “The Willow Collection”.
