= Chanel Cresswell =

English actress

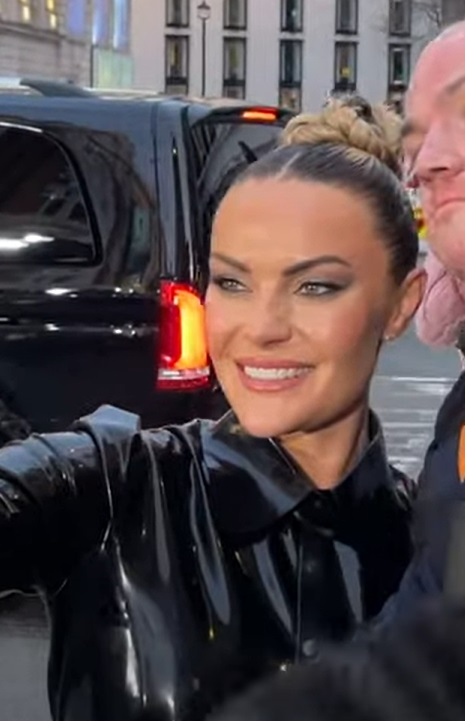
- Cresswell at The Gentlemen premiere 2024
- Born: 23 January 1990 (age 36); Smalley, Derbyshire, England
- Occupation: Actress
- Years active: 2006–present
- Awards: BAFTA for Best Supporting Actress (2016)

Chanel Cresswell (born 23 January 1990) is an English actress, known for playing Kelly Jenkins in the film This Is England (2006) and the three subsequent series This Is England '86 (2010), This Is England '88 (2011) and This Is England '90 (2015), for the last of which she won the BAFTA for Best Supporting Actress in 2016.

Other credits include starring as Katie McVey in the Sky One sitcom Trollied (2011–2013, 2015–2018), as Coleen Rooney in Channel 4's Vardy v Rooney: A Courtroom Drama (2022), and as Tammy in the Guy Ritchie Netflix television series The Gentlemen (2024).

== Early life ==
Cresswell was born on 23 January 1990, in Derbyshire. She grew up in Codnor, Derbyshire, and attended Aldercar Community Language College. Her first experience in acting was in a school play version of Bugsy Malone. While still at school, she joined the Nottingham Television Workshop, where she was successfully auditioned by Shane Meadows.

== Career ==
Cresswell's first role came in 2006 as a child actress, playing Kelly Jenkins in the film This Is England when she was fifteen years old. She subsequently appeared as Kelly again in the next three miniseries that followed in September 2010, December 2011 and September until October 2015 which aired on Channel 4. She won the BAFTA for Best Supporting Actress for her role in the This is England series at the 2016 British Academy Television Awards.

She has also appeared in Casualty, Butterfly, Bale, and Wish 143, before playing Hailey in the TV movie Dive. From 2011 to 2013 Cresswell starred in Sky One sitcom Trollied as Katie McVey, returning to the show in 2015 and continued in this until the final episode in December 2018. She appeared in a main role as Jess Meredith in ITV drama series, The Bay in March 2019.

In 2022, Cresswell starred as Coleen Rooney in the Channel 4 two-part courtroom drama alongside Michael Sheen and Natalia Tena in Vardy v Rooney: A Courtroom Drama.

In 2024, she appeared as Tammy alongside Theo James and Daniel Ings in the Guy Ritchie Netflix television series The Gentlemen.

== Filmography ==
=== Film ===
Year	Title	Role	Notes
2006	This Is England	Kelly Jenkins	
2009	Bale	Sarah	Short film
2009	Wish 143	Amy	Short film
2009	Butterfly	Jo	Short film
2010	Dirty Egg	The Girl	Short film
2011	Papa	Student	Short film
2011	Cardinal	Lustful Woman	
2014	Bypass	Emily	
2017	My Name Is Lenny	Val	
2017	Pin Cushion	Belinda	
2018	The Agency	Pamela	Short film
2018	Medusa's Ankles		Short film
2018	Strangeways Here We Come	Becki	
2021	Love Spreads	Jess	
2023	Distressing Images	Abi Collier	Short film

=== Television ===
Year	Title	Role	Notes
2010	Dive	Hailey	TV film
2010	This Is England '86	Kelly Jenkins	Mini-series; 4 episodes
2011	Casualty	Liz Roberts	1 episode
2011	The Case	Julie Prior	5 episodes
2011	This Is England '88	Kelly Jenkins	Mini-series; 3 episodes
2011–2013, 2015–2018	Trollied	Katie McVey	Regular role, 56 episodes
2014	Silent Witness	Jill Bond	2 episodes
2015	This Is England '90	Kelly Jenkins	Mini-series; 4 episodes
2015	Alt	Cat	TV film
2016	Vera	Charlie	Guest role
2016	The Aliens	Paulette	E4 TV series; recurring role
2017	Murdered for Being Different	DC Steph Farley	TV film based on Murder of Sophie Lancaster
2018	That Girl	Ashley	TV movie
2018	The Split	Kelsey	BBC One TV series
2018–2020	On the Edge	Ashley	Three-part drama series
2019	The Bay	Jess Meredith	ITV drama series
2020	Dracula	Kathleen	BBC One drama series
2020	Death in Paradise	Tasmin Lewis	BBC One drama series
2020	Des	Lesley Mead	ITV mini-series; two episodes
2022	Sherwood	Rosie Jackson	BBC One drama series; one episode
2022	Vardy v Rooney: A Courtroom Drama	Coleen Rooney	Channel 4 two-part drama
2024	The Gentlemen	Tammy	Netflix original series; 6 episodes
2026	Dirty Business	Hanna Swift	Channel 4 docudrama series
2026	Power: The Downfall of Huw Edwards	Scarlet Howes	Docudrama film
2026	MobLand	Mel Cooper	Paramount+ series
