= Nerys Jefford =

British judge (born 1962)

The Honourable Mrs Justice Jefford
- Royal coat of arms of the United Kingdom

High Court Judge King's Bench Division
- Incumbent
- Assumed office 3 October 2016
- Monarch: Charles III

Personal details
- Born: 25 December 1962 (age 63) Swansea, Wales
- Education: Lady Margaret Hall, Oxford

Dame Nerys Angharad Jefford, styled The Honourable Mrs Justice Jefford, DBE (born 25 December 1962) is a High Court Judge of England and Wales.

== Early life ==
She was born in Swansea, Wales and educated at Olchfa School. Jefford graduated from Lady Margaret Hall, Oxford in 1984, followed by an LLM from the University of Virginia in 1985, where she was a Fulbright Scholar.

== Career ==
Jefford was called to the Bar at Gray's Inn in 1986, became a QC in 2008, and was appointed as a Recorder in 2007. In addition to practice, Jefford contributed to Keating on Construction Contracts from the fifth edition in 1991 to the eighth edition in 2006.

=== High Court appointment ===
On 3 October 2016, she was appointed as a High Court judge, assigned to the Queen's Bench Division.

She is the Presiding Judge for Wales and sits on the Technology and Construction Court.

In July 2021, Jefford was part of the first all-female Court of Appeal panel in Wales, sitting alongside Lady Justice Nicola Davies and Mrs Justice Steyn.

== Honours ==
In 2016, Jefford was made a Dame Commander of the Order of the British Empire (DBE).

In 2023 Jefford was awarded an honorary doctorate by Leeds Beckett University.
