= John Robert Moore =

American biographer (1890–1973)

John Robert Moore (1890–1973) was an American biographer and bibliographer of Daniel Defoe.

== Early life and education ==
John Robert Moore was born in Pueblo, Colorado, the son of an Episcopalian minister. Moore attended the University of Missouri where he received an A.B. in 1910 and an A.M. in 1914. After completing his degrees at the University of Missouri, he went to Harvard University where he earned a Ph.D. in 1917 with a dissertation on ballads.

== Career ==
After teaching at the University of Wisconsin, the University of Delaware, the University of Michigan, and the University of Washington, Moore came to Indiana University as an associate professor of English. He was promoted to professor in 1929. Over the course of his teaching career, he taught in thirteen states, in Canada, and in England.

Moore published research almost all areas of English and American literature, with special emphasis on English dramatic history, the poetry and fiction of Sir Walter Scott, the plays of Shakespeare, and early English ballads. From the early 1930s, he was internationally known as one of the leading scholars of Augustan literature and history and a specialist in the political and literary activities of Daniel Defoe.

In addition to his teaching and scholarly work, Moore published a considerable amount of poetry. Some of the poetry was collected and reissued in the book Symphonies and Songs. He also edited anthologies of English drama, English poetry, and English and American essays. He lectured widely, in the United States and abroad, often as the principle speaker at conferences of the many distinguished scholarly societies to which he had been elected. These scholarly societies included the Royal Academy, the Oxford Bibliographical Society, and the London Bibliographical Society. Moore was the first Senior Fellow of the Henry E. Huntington Library.

== Work on Defoe ==
Moore wrote 4 books about Daniel Defoe and more than 55 articles. In 1930 he became convinced that A General History of the Pyrates was written by Defoe, and announced this finding in 1932. He went on to attribute also Robert Drury's Journal to Defoe alone (going much further than previous bibliographers William Lee who had rejected the idea, Samuel Pasfield Oliver, and William Peterfield Trent). This attribution turned out to be highly controversial. It was criticised by Arthur W. Secord in a 1945 paper. In later attacking Moore's work on the Defoe canon as a whole, Rodney Baine picked out the attribution of Robert Drury's Journal as an egregious example.

== Death ==
Moore died at the age of 83 on July 18, 1973.

== Works ==
His works include:

- Defoe in the Pillory and Other Studies; 1939.
- Daniel Defoe: Citizen of the Modern World; 1958, University of Chicago Press, ISBN 0-608-09024-7.
