= Nicola Davies (judge) =

British judge (born 1953)

The Right Honourable Lady Justice Nicola Davies DBE
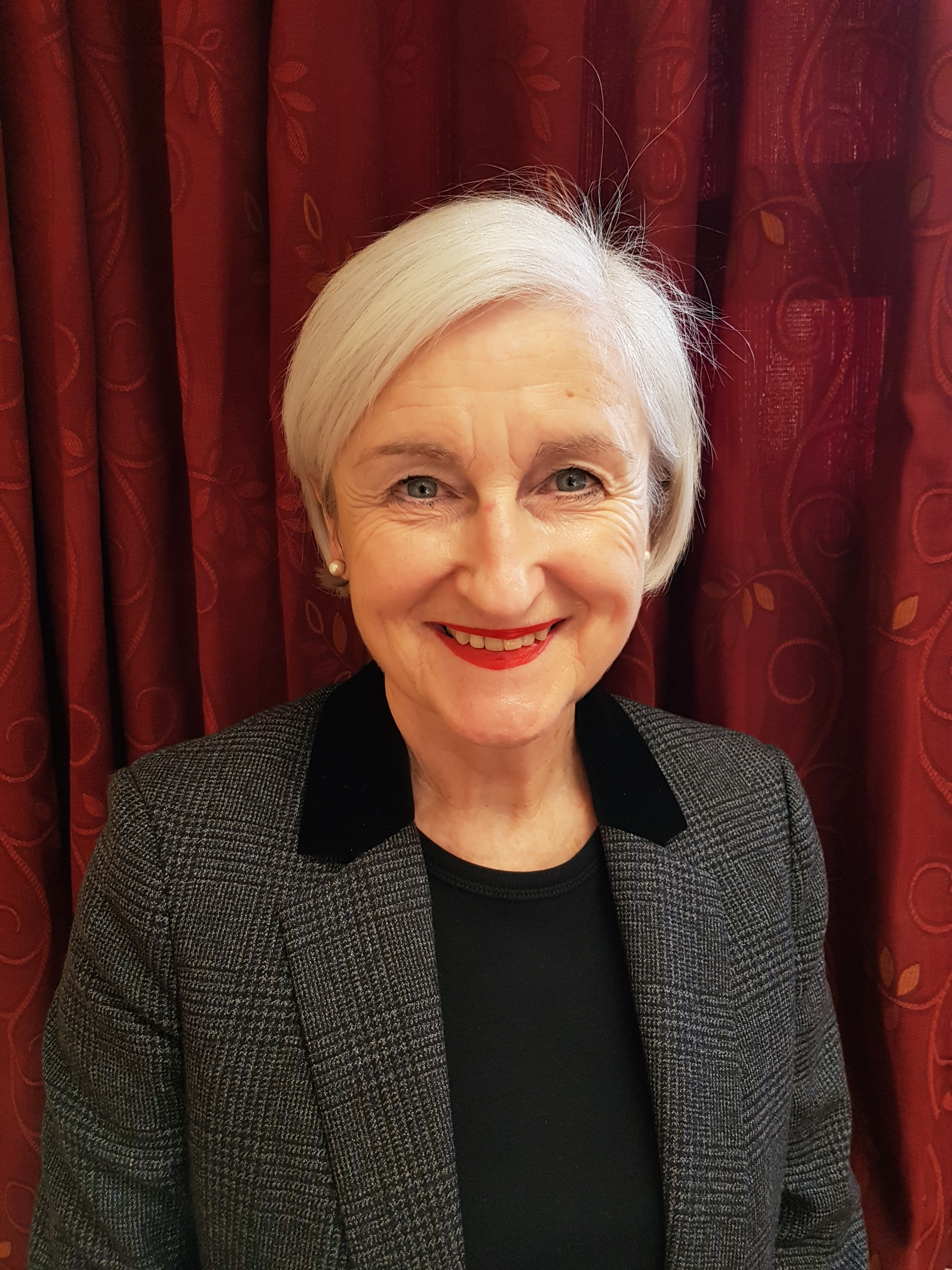
- Davies in 2017

Lady Justice of Appeal
- Incumbent
- Assumed office 2018

Justice of the High Court
- In office 2010–2018

Personal details
- Born: Nicola Velfor Davies; 13 March 1953 (age 73) Llanelli, Wales, United Kingdom
- Education: University of Birmingham

Dame Nicola Velfor Davies, DBE (born 13 March 1953) is a British barrister and judge who is currently a Lady Justice of Appeal, to which she was appointed in 2018. At the Bar she practised in medical law. She is referred to as Rt Hon Lady Justice Nicola Davies.

== Early life ==
Davies was born in Llanelli, Wales, and grew up in Bridgend. Her father, Eric Davies, was a chartered engineer who was employed by the Steel Company of Wales, and she has a younger brother called Jonathan. She was educated at Bridgend Girls' Grammar School (now closed), where she was the last head girl. In 1971 she entered University of Birmingham to read law.

== Career ==
After graduating, Davies worked briefly in a firm of solicitors before becoming an investment analyst in the City of London. She later decided to become a barrister and did her second six-month pupillage at Carpmael Buildings, which later became 3 Serjeant's Inn. She was called to the bar at Gray's Inn in 1976. As a young barrister acting as a junior counsel to the two doctors involved in the Cleveland child abuse cases, she became recognised as a medical specialist. She also became a member of the Treasury Panels.

In 1992, at the age of 39, she became a Queen's Counsel, and in 1998 she was appointed to sit as an Assistant Recorder. She chaired two Inquiries. In 1998 Davies spent six months on the Bristol heart surgeon's case, then took on the defence of the doctor and serial killer Harold Shipman.

In 2003, Davies was appointed as a deputy High Court judge. On judicial review she quashed a decision to close some National Health Service paediatric surgery units. She was appointed a High Court judge in 2010.

In 2013 Davies was appointed as a Presiding Judge of the Wales Circuit between 1 January 2014 and 31 December 2017.

Davies is an Honorary Fellow of Cardiff University.

She was sworn as a member of the Privy Council of the United Kingdom in 2018.

In July 2021, Davies made legal history, chairing the first all-female Court of Appeal session in Wales, sitting alongside Mrs Justice Jefford and Mrs Justice Steyn.

In January 2025, Davies was appointed Chancellor at Aberystwyth University, the first woman to hold the position.

She holds honorary degrees from the University of South Wales (2014), the University of Wales (2017), and Swansea University (2019).

Academic offices
Preceded by Lord Thomas of Cwmgiedd	President of Aberystwyth University; 2025–present	Succeeded by Incumbent
