= Wagatha Christie =

English libel dispute in 2019–2022

Vardy v Rooney
- Court: High Court of Justice
- Started: 10 May 2022
- Decided: 29 July 2022
- Docket nos.: Case No: QB-2020-002028
- Citation: Vardy v Rooney[2022] EWHC 2017 (QB)

Case history
- Subsequent actions: Costs hearing, May 2024; April 2025 appeal dismissed by Mr Justice Cavanagh

Court membership
- Judge sitting: Mrs Justice Steyn

Wagatha Christie was the name given to a dispute between the British media personalities Rebekah Vardy and Coleen Rooney, which culminated in a 2022 libel case in the English High Court, Vardy v Rooney.

In 2019, Rooney announced on Twitter that Vardy's Instagram account was leaking posts from Rooney's private account to the newspaper The Sun. In 2020, Vardy sued Rooney for libel, and the case came to trial in London in May 2022. On 29 July, the court dismissed Vardy's claim on the basis that Rooney's statements were substantially true. Vardy was ordered to pay a substantial proportion of Rooney's legal expenses, which, together with her own legal costs, were estimated to total £3 million.

The dispute and trial attracted significant media attention, in part because Vardy and Rooney are "WAGs", an acronym applied by the British media to the wives and girlfriends of prominent British footballers. The case acquired its popular name, a portmanteau of WAG and the name of the whodunit fiction writer Agatha Christie, because of the steps taken by Rooney to investigate the source of the leaks.

== Dispute ==
In 2019, Coleen Rooney, the wife of the footballer Wayne Rooney, suspected that posts from her private Instagram account were being leaked to The Sun, a British tabloid newspaper that regularly publishes celebrity stories. To determine the source, Rooney changed her Instagram settings so they could only be viewed by Rebekah Vardy, the wife of the footballer Jamie Vardy and who she suspected of being the leak, and she posted fabricated stories. The Sun proceeded to publish these stories, which included claims that the basement of Rooney's house had flooded, that Rooney had visited Mexico to "make a baby girl", and that Rooney had planned to appear on Strictly Come Dancing.

In late 2019, Rooney posted on Twitter that Vardy had leaked the stories to the press. Rooney's tweet went viral and was dubbed "Wagatha Christie", a portmanteau of the term "WAG" – an acronym for the wives and girlfriends of professional athletes – and the name Agatha Christie, a writer of whodunit crime fiction. The term was coined on Twitter by the writer and comedian Dan Atkinson. Vardy responded to Rooney on Twitter, denying the claims and implying her Instagram account had been hacked.

== Litigation ==
=== Proceedings and trial ===
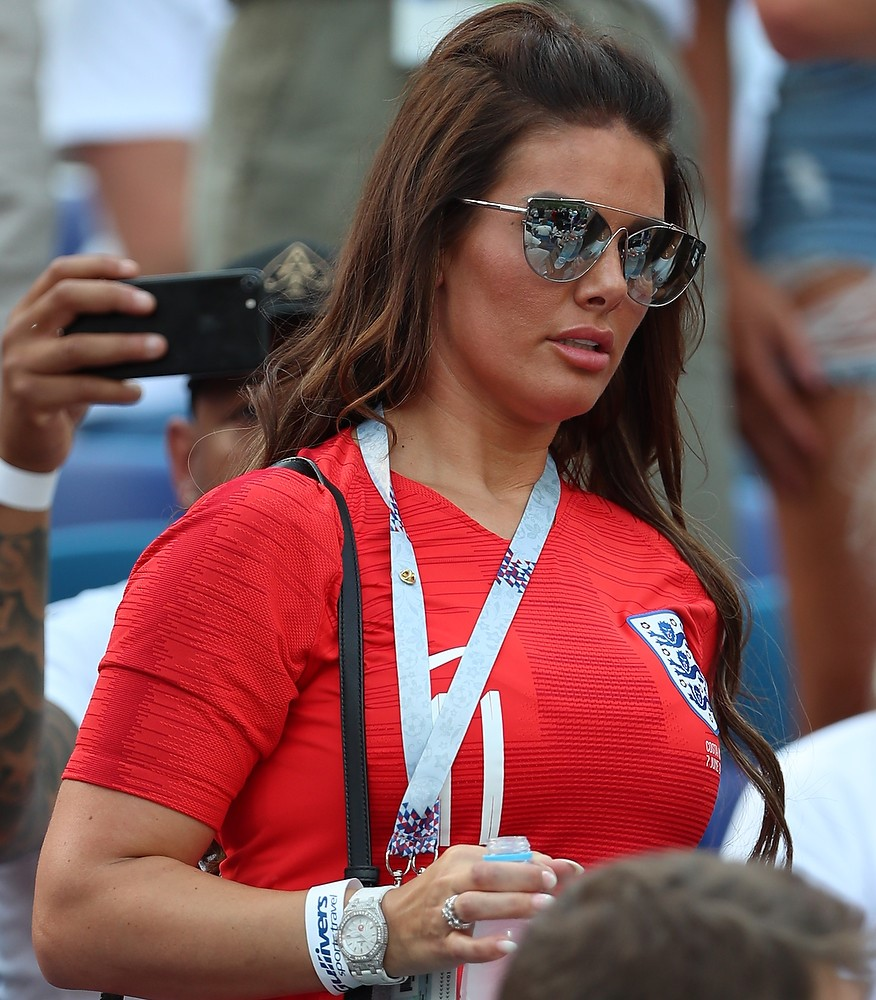
Vardy in 2018

In June 2020, Vardy commenced action in the English High Court to sue Rooney for defamation. Defamation and libel cases are often not brought to the High Court; lawyers often advise against taking such cases to court because the reputational loss for the complainant is often high. At a preliminary High Court hearing on 19 November 2020, Mr. Justice Warby found Rooney had used defamatory words about Vardy. Neither Rooney nor Vardy were at the court.

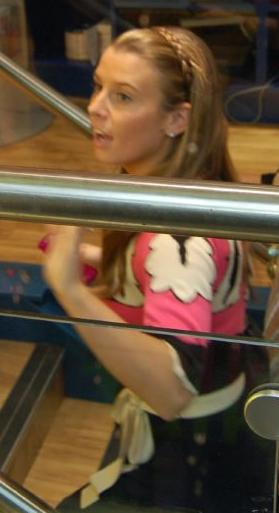
Rooney in 2006

Vardy argued that the accusation over her Instagram account was false. Following the earlier ruling, it was Rooney's onus to prove Vardy was responsible for leaking stories to The Sun or to convince the judge that publication of the allegation was in the public interest. Rooney testified that she offered several out-of-court settlements.

The trial commenced on 10 May 2022. During the proceedings, Rooney requested documents related to The Sun publisher News Group Newspapers and four The Sun journalists. The judge Mrs. Justice Steyn allowed Vardy to use written summaries from these journalists as part of the case.

The judge also asked for the mobile phones of Vardy and her agent Caroline Watt to be searched. Watt said she had accidentally dropped her phone into the North Sea during a family holiday in Scotland. Vardy's copy of the messages were said to have been lost during a failed backup when Vardy's technology expert "[forgot] the password which he used to encrypt the material". Rooney's lawyer David Sherborne said these were attempts to conceal incriminating evidence. Rooney's lawyers also cited the Armory v Delamirie case of 1722, which set a precedent stating that any deliberately missing evidence in a case should be assumed to be of the highest possible value, arguing that this also applies to electronic communications.

Rooney alleged Vardy was the source of information for The Sun on Sunday's "Secret Wag" feature, an anonymous column that discussed the private lives of others. Sherborne questioned Vardy about her history of leaking information to the tabloid press, quoting from a 2004 interview in which Vardy detailed a sexual encounter with singer Peter Andre. Vardy apologised, saying her former husband had forced her to participate in the interview and that her words had been misrepresented. The trial ended on 19 May 2022.

=== Judgment ===
On 29 July, Mrs. Justice Steyn ruled in favour of Rooney. Steyn said that Vardy had regularly passed information about Rooney to the press, was critical of missing evidence from Vardy and called her evidence "manifestly inconsistent with the contemporaneous documentary evidence, evasive or implausible" on "many occasions". Steyn also said The Sun on Sunday's "Secret Wag" column "is highly likely ... [to have been] a journalistic construct rather than a person", and that "the evidence connecting Ms Vardy to this column is thin". Vardy was ordered to pay costs on the indemnity basis. Rooney's barrister at the subsequent costs hearing described Vardy's claim as "probably the most ill-advised legal action since Oscar Wilde put pen to writ."

=== Costs ===
Vardy faced estimated legal costs of approximately £3 million. At a subsequent hearing, Steyn ordered Vardy to pay 90% of Rooney's costs, with the first instalment assessed at £800,000, to be paid by mid-November 2022. The full amount was expected to be approximately £1,500,000. Vardy's legal costs were estimated to be similar, meaning the libel case may have cost her more than £3 million in total.

A specialist costs judge Senior Costs Judge Andrew Gordon-Saker began the assessment of the case costs in May 2024. The costs claimed by Rooney total £1,833,906.89. In a three day preliminary hearing the Judge found that Rooney's lawyers had not committed misconduct by filing a budget which had lower costs than were now being claimed. At the end of the costs hearing Vardy was ordered to pay a further £100,000 on account of costs to Rooney. Mr Justice Cavanagh of the High Court judged against Vardy on appeal in 2025.

== Post-trial reaction ==
=== From Vardy and Rooney ===
After the trial, Vardy said that she was "extremely sad and disappointed at the decision" and that she had been the subject of "vile abuse" since the trial began. She told Kate McCann of TalkTV that the media coverage of the case had been sexist and misogynistic, and she was later said to be experiencing panic attacks and post-traumatic stress as a result of the trial. In 2023 it was reported that Vardy had trademarked the term Wagatha Christie.

In a press statement after the trial, Rooney said that she was pleased but did not believe the case should have gone to court when the money could have been better spent elsewhere. Rooney subsequently described her experience of the litigation as "horrible". She acknowledged that Vardy was "obviously going through it" as a result of the case, but said she could not understand why Vardy had put herself in that position. She has also said she would never forgive Vardy.

=== Media commentary, coverage and dramatisations ===
The trial received international media coverage. Helen Lewis, a writer for the American magazine The Atlantic, called the case "the most ill-advised defamation case" since Oscar Wilde's dispute with the Marquess of Queensberry. Lewis wrote that the trial represented "a clash between different ideas of celebrity", with Rooney guarding her privacy and Vardy "an avatar of a made-for-Instagram world, in which you are a fool if you do not monetise your personal life". The Guardian commented that the judgment had left Vardy's reputation "in tatters".

The trial has been dramatised in stage and television adaptations. Channel 4 broadcast its dramatisation, Vardy v Rooney: A Courtroom Drama, in December 2022. Vardy v Rooney: The Wagatha Christie Trial, a verbatim dramatisation of the trial, was adapted for stage by Liv Hennessy and directed by Lisa Spirling. The play premiered at Wyndham's Theatre in London's West End between November 2022 and January 2023 and then transferred to the Ambassadors Theatre in the West End between April 2023 and May 2023. In 2024, it was nominated for the Noël Coward Olivier Award. Lucy May Barker and Laura Dos Santos played Vardy and Rooney. A two-part TV documentary, Vardy vs Rooney: The Wagatha Trial, was aired in November 2022 on Discovery+.

In October 2023, Coleen Rooney: The Real Wagatha Story, a drama documentary about the story and court case telling Rooney's side of the story, was released on Disney+. In August 2024, Wagspiracy: Vardy v Rooney was broadcast on BBC Three.

== See also ==
- Canary trap
- English defamation law
- Trial by media
