= The Welsh Way =

2021 non-fiction book

The Welsh Way: Essays on Neoliberalism and Devolution is a 2021 non-fiction book gathering a collection of essays on neoliberalism and devolution in Wales.

== Summary ==
The book is a collection of essays focusing on neoliberalism and devolution in Wales, particularly criticising the Welsh Labour government that has run the Senedd since its inception in 1999. In an article written in Voice.Wales, the editors claimed that "despite Welsh Labour’s relentless self-mythologising over the past twenty years, Wales is, in practice, a deeply neoliberal country. Devolution has so far achieved little except to shore up Labour’s dominance in this struggling, disenfranchised, poverty-ridden enclave of the British Isles."

The book was edited by Kieron Smith of Swansea University, writer Dan Evans, and Huw Williams of Cardiff University. A foreword was written by Welsh actor Michael Sheen.

== Reception ==
Adam Somerset of the Wales Arts Review described the book as "four hundred pages of concentrated interrogation and debate on the direction of Welsh politics, culture and society," saying that the essays "certainly speak to power in a way that is broad and unrelenting," but criticised the book for editing errors and a tendency towards Welsh exceptionalism. Dylan Moore of the Institute of Welsh Affairs stated that "there can be no doubt that The Welsh Way is a wake up call," but "it must also be recognised that this loose collective of marginalised academics represent a very narrow milieu of Welsh life." Jon Gower of Nation.Cymru said that "the essays in this urgently timely collection are indictments, charges made against those who currently run the country" and that the "evidence amassed is of the forensic kind."

Former Plaid Cymru leader Leanne Wood said that the book makes "the case that the government in Wales – led by Labour for more than 20 years since the Senedd’s inception in 1999 – has pursued a neoliberal agenda designed to preserve the status quo" and that the Welsh government's rhetoric of clear red water was "yet another spun line."
