= William Lee (civil engineer) =

English civil and sanitary engineer (1812–1891)

William Lee (1812–1891) was an English civil and sanitary engineer. He is now best known in his role as biographer and bibliographer of Daniel Defoe.

== Life ==
He was born in Sheffield, and became Surveyor of Highways. He was one of the inspectors recruited by Edwin Chadwick in promoting his General Board of Health.

Lee was Secretary of the Sheffield Literary and Philosophical Society from 1845 to 1850. John Holland was a friend.

== Publications ==
=== Works on Defoe ===
He wrote numerous contributions to Notes and Queries on Defoe:

- http://english.illinoisstate.edu/digitaldefoe/multimedia/leeservitude.pdf
- http://english.illinoisstate.edu/digitaldefoe/multimedia/leemoralvii.pdf
- http://english.illinoisstate.edu/digitaldefoe/multimedia/leev.pdf
- http://english.illinoisstate.edu/digitaldefoe/multimedia/leevii.pdf
- http://english.illinoisstate.edu/digitaldefoe/multimedia/leeviii.pdf

George Saintsbury found Lee's attributions impressionistic; they brought the number of works credited to Defoe to 254, of which 64 were novel attributions. William Peterfield Trent wrote that Lee's researches were set off by the discovery of correspondence showing that Defoe had worked as a government agent. Furbank and Owens state that Lee was motivated by the dislike he had for the radical Defoe portrayed by Walter Wilson.

=== Other works ===
- On Modern Carriageways: Being a Paper Read Before The Sheffield Literary and Philosophical Society, on Friday, November 3, 1843 (1843)
