= Karen Steyn =

British judge (born 1970)

The Honourable Mrs Justice Steyn DBE
- Royal coat of arms of the United Kingdom

High Court Judge King's Bench Division
- Incumbent
- Assumed office 1 October 2019
- Monarchs: Elizabeth II; Charles III

Personal details
- Born: 20 October 1970 (age 55) Cape Town, Cape Province South Africa
- Education: University of Liverpool

Dame Karen Margaret Steyn, DBE (born 20 October 1970) is a British High Court judge.

== Early life and education ==
Steyn is the daughter of former Lord of Appeal in Ordinary Lord Steyn and his wife Jean Steyn and was born in Cape Town, South Africa and grew up in Kent, England. She was educated at Tonbridge Grammar School and completed a BA in history at the University of Liverpool. Following her bachelor's, she completed a postgraduate law conversion course at City University and she received Middle Temple's Harmsworth Scholarship.

== Career ==
Steyn was called to the bar at Middle Temple in 1995. She practised public law, human rights and public international law, from 4–5 Gray's Inn Square from 1996 to 2000, then 11 King's Bench Walk from 2000. She took silk in 2014 and was appointed a deputy High Court judge in 2016.

=== High Court appointment ===
On 1 October 2019, Steyn was appointed a judge of the High Court, replacing the retiring Sir Timothy King, and assigned to the Queen's Bench Division. She received the customary damehood in the same year. She serves as a liaison judge for the Administrative Court. In 2020, Steyn served as a temporary judicial commissioner under the Investigatory Powers Commissioner Sir Brian Leveson. In 2021, Steyn along with Lady Justice Nicola Davies and Mrs Justice Jefford comprised the first all-female bench on the Court of Appeal.

== Personal life ==
In 1997, she married Alexander Glassbrook, with whom she has two sons.

== See also ==
- Rebekah Vardy v Coleen Rooney
