= Rebekah Vardy =

British media personality (born 1982)

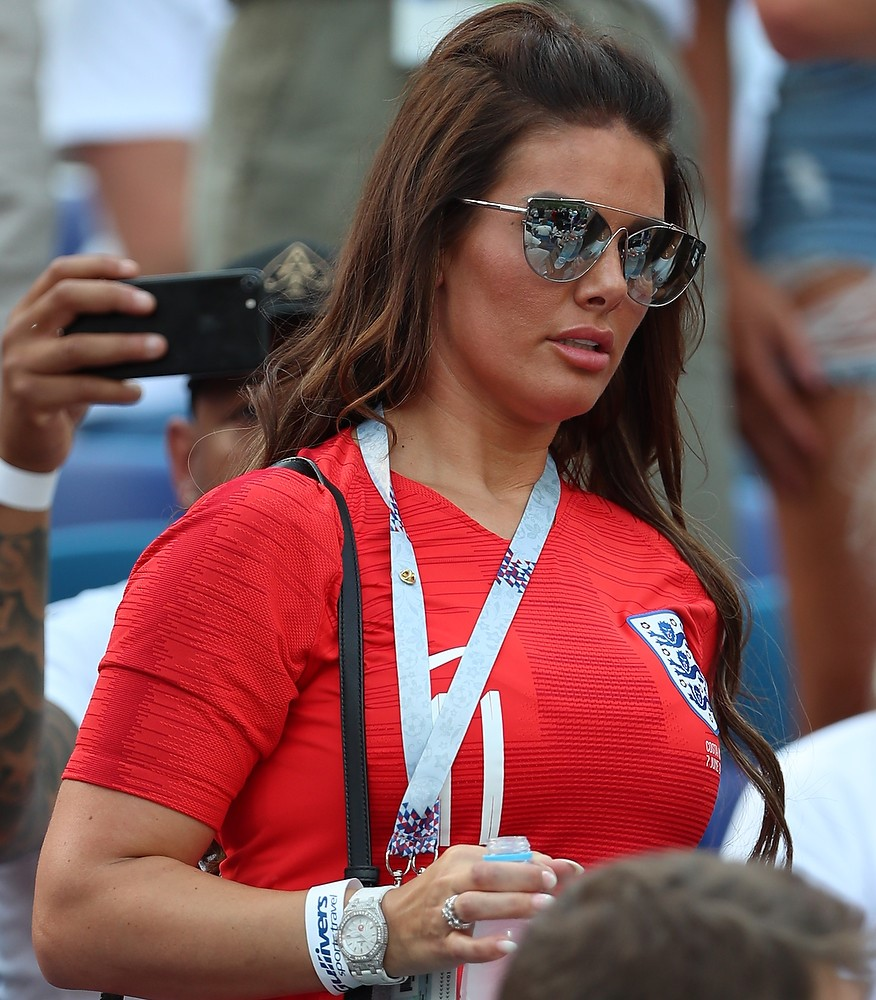
- Vardy at the 2018 FIFA World Cup
- Born: Rebekah Miranda; 17 February 1982 (age 44); Norwich, Norfolk, England
- Occupations: Media personality; model
- Television: I'm a Celebrity...Get Me Out of Here! (2017); Dancing on Ice (2021)
- Spouses: Mark Godden (m. 2001; div. 2003) Steve Clarke (m. 2005; div. 2006) Jamie Vardy (m. 2016)
- Partner: Luke Foster (2007–2013)
- Children: 5

Rebekah Vardy (née Miranda; previously Nicholson; born 17 February 1982) is a British media personality. She was a contestant on I'm a Celebrity...Get Me Out of Here! in 2017 and on Dancing on Ice in 2021.

== Early life ==
Vardy was born in Norwich. Her parents Carlos and Alison divorced when she was 11 and she moved from city to city, living in Norwich, Reading and Oxford. Vardy's father, Carlos Miranda, was born in Madeira, making Vardy half-Portuguese. She claims she was abused as a child and made homeless at 15. The abuse she suffered had been covered up by leaders of the Jehovah's Witnesses community of which she was a member.

== Career ==
In November 2017, Vardy was a contestant on the seventeenth series of the ITV reality TV show I'm a Celebrity... Get Me Out of Here!. Vardy was the third celebrity to be eliminated, on 4 December 2017. Vardy has made appearances as a guest panellist and presenter on Loose Women. She has appeared on Good Morning Britain, Jeremy Vine and This Morning. In 2019, Vardy appeared in two episodes of Celebrity Gogglebox alongside husband Jamie, and an episode of How To Spend it Well at Christmas in 2019 alongside her family. In September 2020, it was announced she would be competing in the thirteenth series of Dancing on Ice in 2021. She was partnered with Andy Buchanan and was eliminated in week 6.

== Personal life ==
=== Relationships and children ===
In 2001, Vardy, who went by Becky Nicholson then, met Mark Godden who played on the darts team at the bar she worked at in Oxfordshire. In Autumn of the same year they were married on a beach in Puerto Vallarta, Mexico after she saw a dazzling engagement ring in a magazine and demanded that he buy it for her. They separated six months later. Godden claims Vardy cheated on him with a jet ski instructor on their honeymoon, Peter Andre, and the man who would become her second husband, Stephen Clarke.

In November 2001, Vardy had a one night stand with Peter Andre. She sold the story of their sexual encounter to News of the World where she was quoted in the article saying derogatory and offensive remarks about his manhood.

In 2001, Vardy met Stephen Clarke while working at the same timeshare firm as him. They married in 2005 in Oxfordshire, but quickly divorced 10 months later when Clarke found out he was not the father of the baby Vardy was pregnant with.

In 2004, Vardy fell pregnant to an unknown male and she gave birth to a daughter in May 2005.

In 2007, Vardy began dating footballer Luke Foster, who was a defender for Conference side Oxford United at the time. In January, 2010, Vardy gave birth to their son, the first child for Foster and Vardy’s second child. The couple separated in October 2013, after Foster was unable to secure a position with a higher level football team. Foster claims Vardy was always reading celebrity magazines, had an obsession with wanting the life that WAGs Victoria Beckham and Coleen Rooney have, and was such an extravagant spender that it financially crippled him.

In January 2014, she met footballer Jamie Vardy while working at the Viper Rooms nightclub where he celebrated his 27th-birthday party. She fell pregnant within weeks of meeting and gave birth to their baby in October, 2014, nine months after first meeting. It is Rebekah’s third child and Jamie’s second child, but their first together. They got married on 25 May 2016. Their second child was born January 2017, and they welcomed a third in December 2019.

=== Charity work ===
Rebekah and Jamie Vardy are both Family ambassadors to Barnardo's. Vardy is also a patron of the Dorothy Goodman School in Leicestershire. She has supported Leicester-based homelessness charity Homelessness To Hope, having officially opened the Hope Centre, and has supported the Jeans For Genes charity campaign. Vardy supported the family of Alfie Evans, an infant boy from Liverpool with a then-undiagnosed neurodegenerative disorder, in their campaign to have him sent abroad for further treatment.

=== Legal disputes ===
On 9 October 2019, Coleen Rooney, the wife of another footballer, Wayne Rooney, made a Twitter post alleging that posts from her private Instagram account were being leaked to the newspaper The Sun. Rooney said that, to catch who was selling the stories, she had restricted access on who could see the posts. She stated that the only viewer of these posts was Vardy's account. This Tweet went viral, being dubbed the 'Wagatha Christie', a portmanteau of the football term WAG and mystery author Agatha Christie. Vardy responded on her own Twitter account, denying the claims and stating that her Instagram had been hacked.

In June 2020, Vardy sued Rooney for defamation. Although Vardy won a preliminary stage in the case in November 2020, in July 2022, following the full trial, the judge ruled against Vardy and determined that Rooney's claims were "substantially true". The judge described Vardy as "an untrustworthy witness" and found that she probably worked with her agent to leak stories about Rooney to the press. Vardy said she was sad and disappointed with the decision, but stated she would not appeal. In October 2022, Vardy was ordered by the court to pay 90% of Rooney's legal costs, which was reported to be a higher proportion than is usual in such cases. The judge made this decision partly because Vardy had been found to have destroyed relevant evidence prior to the trial. As a result, Vardy was ordered to make an immediate payment to Rooney of £800,000 with the remainder to be assessed with the maximum amount set at £1.5 million. Vardy's own legal costs were estimated to have been a similar figure, resulting in the total cost for Vardy of the litigation she commenced but lost being potentially around £3 million.

In October 2024, a new ruling on the case dismissed a number of Vardy’s claims and ruled that Rooney’s team had not committed any misconduct, and therefore it was "not an appropriate case" to reduce the amount Vardy had to pay.

=== Life in Italy and reality series ===
Vardy accompanied her husband following his move to Italy. In November 2025, their villa in Salò, Italy, was burgled while they were away, with thieves stealing valuables worth approximately £80,000 from the family home. The incident featured in ITV's reality series The Vardys, where Vardy described feeling "horribly violated" after discovering intruders had searched through their belongings. The series also documented their new life abroad, including family challenges, the aftermath of the burglary, and Vardy's reflections on the Wagatha Christie controversy. Following the burglary, Vardy decided that she and the children would be happier and safer returning to the United Kingdom, while her husband remained in Italy to continue playing for Cremonese for the remainder of the 2025–26 season.

On 12 May 2026, Netflix released Untold UK: Jamie Vardy as part of its Untold series, featuring interviews with Vardy alongside unseen archive footage and personal accounts exploring her husband's career and life away from football.

== Bibliography ==
- Vardy, Jamie; Vardy, Rebekah (2022). Cedric: The Little Sloth with a Big Dream. Exeter: Little Brother Books Limited. ISBN 1912342243.
