= This Time Next Year =

This Time Next Year may refer to:

- This Time Next Year (album), a 2000 album by The Movielife
- This Time Next Year, a 2022 album by Gabbie Hanna
- This Time Next Year (band), an American pop punk/melodic hardcore band
- This Time Next Year (British TV series), a reality television series presented by Davina McCall
- This Time Next Year (Australian TV series), an Australian version of the British series
- This Time Next Year (film), a 2024 romantic comedy film directed by Nick Moore

== See also ==
- Same Time, Next Year (disambiguation)
