= Davina McCall =

British television presenter (born 1967)

Davina McCall MBE
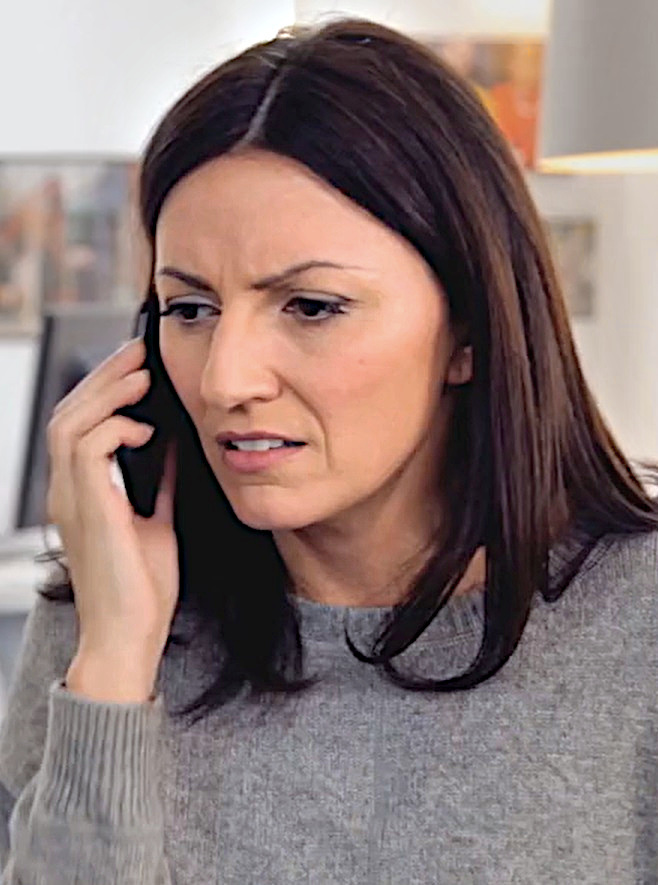
- McCall in 2018
- Born: Davina Lucy Pascale McCall; 16 October 1967 (age 59); Wimbledon, London, England
- Citizenship: United Kingdom; France
- Occupation: Television presenter
- Years active: 1992–present
- Employers: ITV; Channel 4; UKTV
- Spouses: Andrew Leggett (m. 1997; div. 1997); Matthew Robertson (m. 2000; div. 2018); Michael Douglas (m. 2025)
- Children: 3
- Relatives: Célestin Hennion (great-grandfather)
- Website: thisisdavina.com

Davina Lucy Pascale McCall (born 16 October 1967) is an English television presenter. She has presented various television shows for Channel 4, including Streetmate (1998–2001, 2016), Big Brother (2000–2010), The Million Pound Drop (2010–2015), Five Minutes to a Fortune (2013), and The Jump (2014–2017), as well as the ITV shows The Biggest Loser (2011–2012), Long Lost Family (2011–present), and This Time Next Year (2016–2019). McCall was a regular co-presenter of the Comic Relief annual telethons from 2005 to 2015. Since 2020, she has been a judge on the ITV singing competition show The Masked Singer.

== Early life and education ==
Davina Lucy Pascale McCall was born on 16 October 1967 in Wimbledon, London, to a French mother, Florence (née Hennion) and an English father, Andrew McCall, a graphic designer and events organiser for Portsmouth Harbour Authority. Hennion had been married previously and had a daughter, McCall’s half-sister, when she had divorced. At the age of three she went to live with her paternal grandparents in Surrey after the break-up of her parents' marriage. Her mother—whom McCall has described as "chaotic" and later, specifically as "an alcoholic"—returned to France, and McCall saw her only on holidays.

McCall attended St Catherine's School, Bramley near Guildford, Surrey and Godolphin and Latymer Girls School, a private school in Hammersmith, West London. At secondary level, McCall studied for nine O levels and two A levels.

== Career ==
McCall's first career was as a singer, and she had been performing in a band, Lazy Bear, while at school. By the age of 19, she had decided to pursue a professional career as a solo classical artist, and briefly started classical vocal coaching.

Dissatisfied with her lack of success in the music industry, McCall gave up singing and took a job at Models 1 on the men's desk as a booker. Later she ran a restaurant for two years before a brief spell in Paris as a Moulin Rouge-style cabaret performer. On her return to London she worked on the nightclub scene as a hostess. Work in this period included an appearance as a dancer in the video for the 1991 Kylie Minogue single "Word Is Out".

In 1994, McCall was hired as a presenter on Ray Cokes' Most Wanted on MTV Europe. She presented Hitlist UK. In 1995, she went on to host the ITV late night game show God's Gift.

=== Channel 4 ===
In 1998, McCall hosted the cult dating show Streetmate, in which she toured the country meeting single people and matching them up. It originally ran on Channel 4 from 1998 to 2001.

McCall was chosen as the presenter of the inaugural series of Big Brother, in which ten housemates entered a sealed house for up to nine weeks and their every move was filmed and then broadcast as a daily highlights television show. McCall hosted the weekly live eviction show, where one contestant would be removed from the house, until the last housemate became the winner. McCall hosted the celebrity version Celebrity Big Brother, the first series of which ran for eight days in March 2001.

McCall's performance on the final night of the sixth series in 2005 attracted press attention and some complaints for her treatment of housemate Makosi Musambasi. In December 2007, McCall presented a New Year's edition of The Friday Night Project, entitled The Friday Night New Year Project 2007.

By the ninth series of Big Brother in 2008, McCall was earning a reported £85,000 per episode. Responding to tabloid claims before the series that she was about to quit Big Brother she said, "I'm not leaving ... They would have to kill me before I'd stop doing it". The ninth series proved to be a low point, however, becoming the least watched summer series in the show's history.

McCall became the regular presenter of the live Big Brother companion show Big Brother's Big Mouth for the tenth and eleventh series, after it was re-formatted into an hour-long show after the weekly live eviction show, having previously occupied the slot after each daily highlights show.

With audience figures falling, Channel 4 decided that the eleventh series in summer 2010 would be the last Big Brother broadcast on their channel, although the show's future was in the hands of the rights holder Endemol. After presenting the seventh and final series of Celebrity Big Brother in January 2010, she fronted her eleventh and final regular edition over the summer. As a finale to the series on Channel 4, McCall also presented the Ultimate Big Brother show, which started immediately after the main series, and featured selected past celebrity and non-celebrity housemates.

Frisky & Mannish with Davina McCall

Having made the decision to leave the show after Ultimate Big Brother, McCall confirmed she would not be returning as host when Channel 5 announced in April 2011 that they had secured the rights to relaunch Big Brother in summer 2011. She gave her backing to Emma Willis as her replacement, stating she still believed the show had potential. Big Brother 2 and Ultimate Big Brother winner Brian Dowling was ultimately chosen to take over McCall's role as presenter of the Channel 5 version, though in 2013 Emma Willis became his successor as the new presenter.

In between the final celebrity and regular editions of Big Brother on Channel 4, McCall began presenting a new game show, The Million Pound Drop. The final episode aired on 20 March 2015, with the primetime series axed in 2016. On 14 July 2017, it was announced that the format would return as a daytime series under the name The £100K Drop.

In 2008 she played herself as both a human and a zombie in Dead Set, a five-part horror parody of Big Brother set in the house.

From 2012 to 2016, McCall co-hosted charity telethon Stand Up to Cancer with Alan Carr, Christian Jessen and Adam Hills. As part of the 2014 telethon, McCall and Carr also hosted a companion series Stars at Your Service.

In April 2013, McCall presented one series of Five Minutes to a Fortune.

From January 2014 to March 2017, McCall presented reality competition The Jump which was broadcast live from Innsbruck and Kühtai in Austria. In 2016, McCall presented Make My Body Better on Channel 4.

=== Sky ===
McCall co-presented the first series of Prickly Heat alongside Julian Clary on Sky1. She was replaced by Denise van Outen for further two series.

On 20 December 2009, McCall began hosting reality programme Got to Dance. On 24 October 2014, it was confirmed that the show had been cancelled after five series. In 2015, McCall presented One Hundred and Eighty, a darts-based game show for Sky1.

=== ITV ===
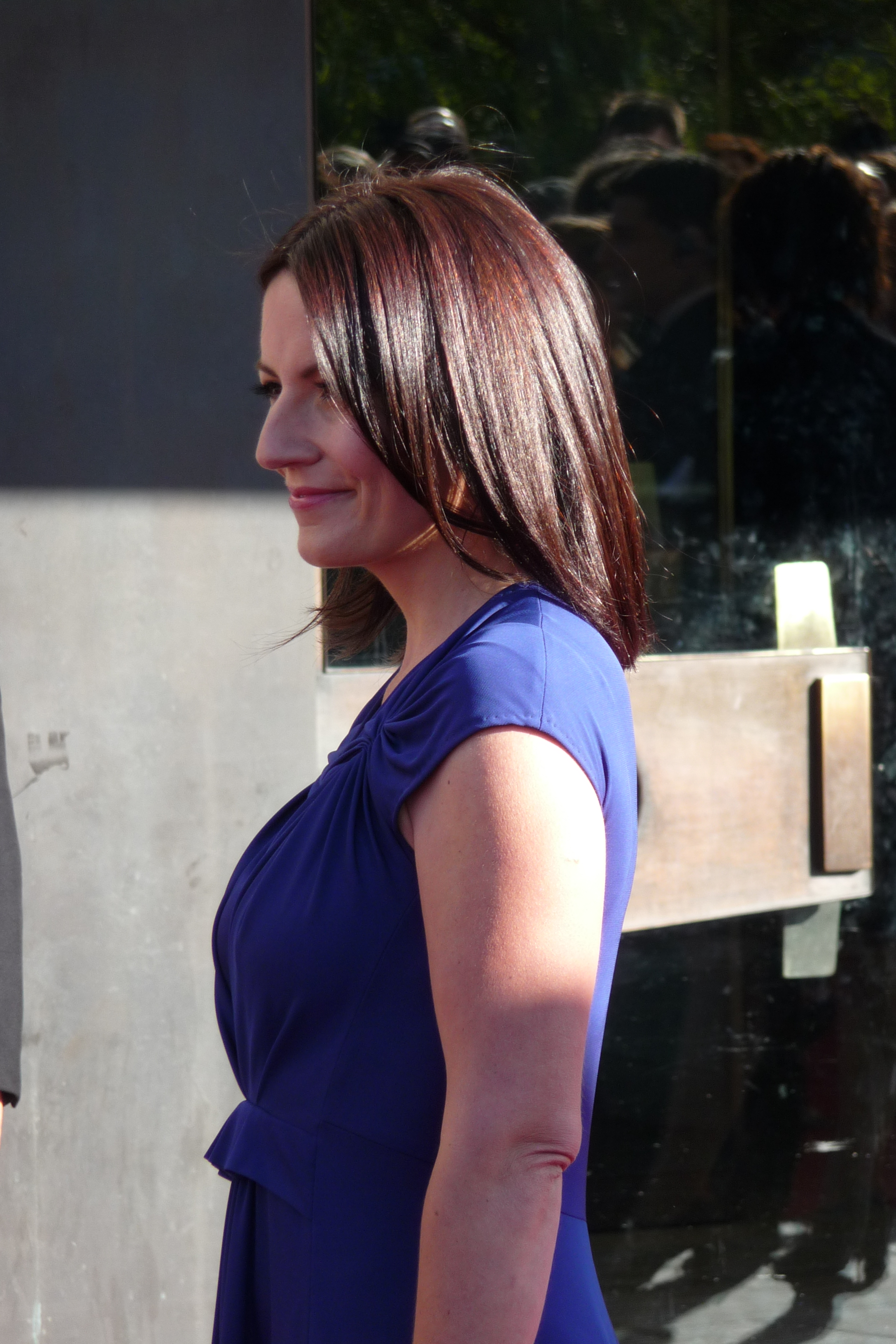
McCall at the British Academy Television Awards in April 2009

McCall co-presented the six part series Birthrace 2000 with Lisa Riley in 1999, which featured couples trying to have the first baby of the millennium.

McCall co-presented four series of Don't Try This at Home for ITV. Her co-presenters were Kate Thornton, Paul Hendy and Darren Day.

When Don't Try This at Home ended in 2001, McCall continued with the channel, presenting series such as Popstars: The Rivals and The Vault (1st series) in 2002, Reborn in the USA in 2003 and Love on a Saturday Night in 2004. She also hosted the British Academy Television Awards 2004 for ITV and again in 2006.

In 2011, McCall began hosting The Biggest Loser and Long Lost Family. After two series, it was announced that The Biggest Loser had been cancelled by ITV in September 2012. Long Lost Family, however, is still being broadcast on the channel, with McCall and Nicky Campbell as hosts.

In 2013, McCall presented Stepping Out which was seen as a rival to BBC One's Strictly Come Dancing.

In 2016, McCall presented a four-part factual series for ITV called Davina McCall: Life at the Extreme. From 2016 to 2019, she has presented three series of This Time Next Year for the channel.

In January 2017, McCall guest presented three episodes of This Morning alongside Phillip Schofield. She returned to guest present an episode in February 2018 with Ore Oduba.

McCall guest presented five episodes of The Nightly Show in March 2017. In 2018, she was the host of A&E Live, a three part series to commemorate 70 years of the NHS. On 9 September 2019, McCall was announced as a judge for The Masked Singer, the UK version of the international music game show Masked Singer. Series 1 aired in January 2020, and series 2 began airing in December 2020. On 4 March 2021, it was announced by ITV that McCall would be appearing as a judge on the brand new spin off show of The Masked Singer UK, The Masked Dancer UK, which aired from 2021 to 2022.

=== BBC ===
During 2005, McCall presented He's Having a Baby.

McCall has been one of the co-presenters of the annual British charity telethons that are organised by Comic Relief on BBC One. Organised on an alternating comedy/sport theme and televised live in March, Red Nose Day has been co-hosted by McCall since 2005. She had previously presented or appeared on various related Comic Relief shows, including: The Record Breaker (1999), Naked Red Nose Ground Force in Practice and Say Pants to Poverty (2001), The Big Hair Do (2003) and Comic Relief Does Fame Academy (2005).

From early 2006, McCall fronted her own prime-time chat show, Davina. Receiving scathing reviews and with viewing figures falling to below half of the six million watching The Bill on ITV at the same time, the show was cancelled in April for not reaching expectations with McCall herself saying that the programme was "the worst mistake of her life".

In 2005, McCall made a cameo appearance in the Doctor Who episode "Bad Wolf" as the voice of Davinadroid, a robot who controlled a future version of the Big Brother house. In 2023, she made a second appearance in the show, in that year's Christmas special "The Church on Ruby Road", as a fictionalised version of herself, who dies after being impaled by a Christmas tree. This is later reversed by the Doctor, who travels back in time to prevent her death.

=== UKTV ===
McCall presented her own show on the W channel from September 2017, called The Davina Hour.

=== Begin Again ===
In October 2024, Davina announced that she was launching her own podcast called Begin Again, which celebrates the "second act" of life. The show aims to empower people to embrace midlife, by sharing stories of growth, rediscovery and creating a sense of renewal.

== Other ventures ==
In 2001, McCall appeared with Ed Byrne, Tristan Gemmill and Tameka Empson as the title character in Sam's Game, a Friends-style sitcom and was widely panned by the critics, it only aired once.

In documentary television, McCall has fronted Let's Talk Sex about sex education and how it is taught in the United Kingdom. She published a companion book to the series. McCall has appeared in a video for schools called "Watch Over Me", talking about her drug addiction and peer pressure.

In August 2014, McCall was one of 200 public figures who were signatories to a letter to The Guardian expressing their hope that Scotland would vote to remain part of the United Kingdom in September's referendum on that issue.

In 2022, McCall released a book entitled Menopausing; in 2023 it won Book of the Year at the British Book Awards.

McCall has released multiple fitness DVDs since 2004, and written multiple books on her sugar-free diet.

== Personal life ==
McCall was appointed Member of the Order of the British Empire (MBE) in the 2023 Birthday Honours for services to broadcasting. She received the Special Recognition award at the 29th National Television Awards in 2024.

Mccall also officially became an French citizen in 2024, while retaining her British citizenship.

=== Family ===
McCall is fluent in French, as her mother is French. McCall began smoking at 12, drinking at 13, and by her early twenties was using heroin. McCall's previous partners included family friend Eric Clapton. He helped her when in her early 20s she developed a heroin addiction. After overcoming the addiction, she gained her own television show on MTV. She gave up smoking when she was 24.

McCall's first marriage was to Andrew Leggett in 1997. In June 2000, she married her second husband Matthew Robertson, presenter of Pet Rescue, at Eastnor Castle, Herefordshire. Together, they had three children: two daughters and a son. In 2018, the couple divorced. McCall announced her engagement to Michael Douglas, a celebrity hairdresser, in September 2025; they married on 5 December 2025.

=== Ancestry ===
McCall's ancestry was examined for a 2009 episode of Who Do You Think You Are?. With the help of historians Jean-Marc Berliere and Simon Kitson, McCall learned that she is the great-granddaughter of Prefect of Police Célestin Hennion (1862–1915), and the great-great-great-granddaughter, on her father's side, of James Thomas Bedborough (1787–1860), a stonemason, councillor, mayor, property developer and entrepreneur, who worked on Windsor Castle and Upton Park in Slough. Bedborough was, according to a story told by McCall's grandmother, said to be an illegitimate son of George IV, but this was neither proved nor disproved on the show. Participants in the programme included Françoise Hennion (Hennion's granddaughter and McCall's mother's cousin) and Pierre, Hennion's son and McCall's grandfather. Pierre gave McCall his father's Royal Victorian Order medal. McCall met Alfred Dreyfus' great-granddaughter, Yael Ruiz, after learning of the part her ancestor Célestin Hennion played in the Dreyfus affair.

=== Charity work ===
In February 2014, McCall undertook a BT Sport Relief challenge called 'Davina – Beyond Breaking Point', seven days of either running, swimming or cycling across the UK to raise money for the UK charity Sport Relief. This challenge was filmed by the BBC as a one-off 60-minute documentary which aired on 20 March 2014 at 21:00 on BBC One. During the live telethon, it was announced that McCall had raised over £2.2 million for Sport Relief 2014.

=== Health ===
In November 2024, McCall announced that she had been diagnosed with a colloid cyst, a rare type of benign brain tumour, and would undergo neurosurgery. The surgery was performed on 15 November at OneWelbeck Neurology. McCall later stated that she was struggling with her short-term memory following the surgery, but was now at home recovering, she said: "I'm on the mend, I'm resting, I'm sleeping loads, I feel really good. And very lucky."

In November 2025, McCall revealed she had been diagnosed with breast cancer after finding what she described as a "very, very small" lump. She had it removed in a lumpectomy and said it was caught early and had not spread. She received five days of radiotherapy in January 2026 as a precaution, and said she hoped sharing her experience "might help someone" and urged others to "get checked".

== Filmography ==
=== Television ===
Year	Title	Role	Notes
1992	MTV Europe	Presenter	Covered F1 weekends due to MTV sponsoring the Simtek team
1993	Eurotrash	Presenter	Female voice dubber for the first series on Channel 4
1995	God's Gift	Presenter	Dating show
1998	The Drop Dead Show	Presenter	
1998	Prickly Heat	Presenter	1 series; with Julian Clary
1998–2001	Don't Try This at Home!	Presenter	4 series
1998–2001	Streetmate	Presenter	3 series (plus 2 specials, in 2003 and 2016)
1999	Birthrace 2000	Presenter	6 episodes; also known as Birth Race 2000 Tonight's the Night
1999	A Day in the life of the Shepherds	Presenter	
2000, 2003	BRIT Awards	Presenter	2 episodes
2000–2010	Big Brother	Presenter	Series 1 to Series 11
2001	Sam's Game	Sam	
2001	Oblivious	Presenter	
2001–2010	Celebrity Big Brother	Presenter	Series 1 to Series 7
2002	The Vault	Presenter	1 series
2002	Popstars: The Rivals	Presenter	1 series
2003	Stars in Their Eyes	Stand-in presenter	3 episodes; stand-in for Matthew Kelly
2003	Reborn in the USA	Presenter	
2004	Love on a Saturday Night	Presenter	
2004, 2006	BAFTA TV Awards	Presenter	2 episodes
2005	Doctor Who	Voice	Voice of Davinadroid in the episode "Bad Wolf"
2005	A Bear's Tail	Dave Ian McCall	
2005	He's Having a Baby	Presenter	
2005–2015, 2021	Comic Relief	Presenter	Co-presenter
2006	Davina	Presenter	1 series
2006–2018	Sport Relief	Co-presenter	
2007	Let's Talk Sex	Presenter	
2007	Big Brother: On The Couch	Presenter	
2007	The Friday Night New Year Project	Guest presenter	
2008	Dead Set	Herself	Plays fictionalised version of herself as Big Brother host (also as a zombie)
2008	4Music's Davina & Steve's 20 Big Ones	Co-presenter	
2008, 2009–2010	Big Brother's Big Mouth	Presenter	
2010	Ultimate Big Brother	Presenter	
2010–2014	Got to Dance	Presenter	5 series
2010–2015	The Million Pound Drop	Presenter	15 series (inc. specials)
2011–2012	The Biggest Loser	Presenter	2 series
2011–	Long Lost Family	Co-presenter	11 series (+ 6 revisited series, + 3 without trace series); with Nicky Campbell
2012	Girls Aloud: Ten Years at the Top	Narrator	One-off programme
2012–2016, 2021	Stand Up to Cancer UK	Co-presenter	3 episodes; with Alan Carr, Christian Jessen and Adam Hills
2013	Five Minutes to a Fortune	Presenter	1 series
2013	Stepping Out	Presenter	1 series
2014	Stars at Your Service	Co-presenter	1 series; with Alan Carr
2014–2017	The Jump	Presenter	4 series; with Alex Brooker in 2014 only
2015	The Secret Life of Your House	Narrator	One-off programme
2015	One Hundred and Eighty	Presenter	1 series; with Freddie Flintoff
2016	Davina McCall: Life at the Extreme	Presenter	1 series
2016–2017	Make My Body Better	Presenter	1 series
2016–2019	This Time Next Year	Presenter	3 series
2017	The Davina Hour	Presenter	1 series
2017	The Nightly Show	Guest presenter	5 episodes
2017, 2018, 2020	This Morning	Guest presenter	5 episodes
2018	Ariana Grande at the BBC		One-off programme
2018–2019	The £100K Drop	Presenter	Daytime series of The Million Pound Drop
2020	The Big Night In	Co-presenter	
2020	Big Brother: Best Shows Ever	Co-presenter	10 episodes; with Rylan Clark-Neal
2020	Back to the Noughties with Davina McCall	Presenter	
2020–	The Masked Singer UK	Judge	4 series
2021	The Masked Dancer UK	Judge	2 series
2021	Davina McCall: Sex, Myths and the Menopause	Presenter	Documentary
2022	Davina McCall's Language of Love	Presenter	Dating reality show
2022	Davina McCall: Sex, Mind and the Menopause	Presenter	Documentary
2022–	Who Cares Wins Awards	Host	Awards ceremony
2023	Davina McCall's Pill Revolution	Presenter	Documentary
2023–	My Mum, Your Dad	Host	Dating show
2022	Celebrity Gogglebox	Herself	Series 5
2022	Doctor Who	Herself	Episode: "The Church on Ruby Road"
2024	Born from the Same Stranger	Narrator	Genealogy show
2024	D-Day 80 at the Royal Albert Hall	Host	One-off special
2025	Stranded on Honeymoon Island	Host	Dating show

Guest appearances

- Blankety Blank (1998)
- The Kumars at No. 42 (2001)
- Top Gear (2005)
- Room 101 (2007, 2017)
- Question Time (2007)
- The Paul O'Grady Show (2008, 2015)
- Would I Lie to You? (2008, 2009)
- Chris Moyles' Quiz Night (2009)
- Who Do You Think You Are? (2009)
- Alan Carr: Chatty Man (2009, 2010, 2012, 2013)
- Celebrity Juice (2010, 2011, 2012, 2014)
- A Comedy Roast (2010)
- This Morning (2011, 2013, 2014, 2015)
- The Jonathan Ross Show (2014)
- Mel and Sue (2015)
- Through the Keyhole (2015)
- Alan Carr's 12 Stars of Christmas (2016)
- Alan Davies: As Yet Untitled (2017)
- John Bishop: In Conversation With... (2017)
- Celebrity Catchphrase (2019)

=== Fitness DVDs ===
- Davina: Power of 3 (released 27 December 2004)
- Davina – My Three 30 Minute Workouts (released 5 December 2005)
- Davina – My Pre & Post Natal Workouts (released 5 March 2007)
- Davina – High Energy Five (released 3 December 2007)
- Davina – Super Body Workout (released 8 December 2008)
- Davina Fit (released 7 December 2009)
- Davina – Body Buff (released 6 December 2010)
- Davina – Ultimate Target (released 5 December 2011)
- Davina Intense (released 10 December 2012)
- Davina – Fit in 15 (released 2 December 2013)
- Davina: 7 Minute Fit (released 26 December 2014)
- Davina: 5 Week Fit (released 26 December 2015)
- Davina: 30 Day Fat Burn (released 26 December 2016)
- Davina: Toned in 10 (released 26 December 2017)

== Bibliography ==
- Davina's 5 Weeks to Sugar Free (released 8 January 2015)
- Davina's Smart Carbs (released 31 December 2015)
- Lessons I've Learned (released 22 September 2016)
- Davina's Sugar-Free in a Hurry (released 29 December 2016)
- Menopausing ISBN 9780008517786 (released 15 September 2022)
