= Prickly Heat (game show) =

Television series

- Also known as: Prickly Heat Global Epidemic (2001)
- Genre: Reality game show
- Presented by: Julian Clary; Davina McCall (1998); Denise Van Outen (2000-1)
- Country of origin: United Kingdom
- Original language: English
- No. of series: 3
- No. of episodes: 30

Production
- Running time: 60 minutes (inc. adverts)
- Production company: LWT

Original release
- Network: Sky One
- Release: 11 October 1998 – 11 March 2001

Prickly Heat is a reality game show broadcast on Sky One from 11 October 1998 to 11 March 2001.

== Transmissions ==
Series	Start date	End date	Episodes
1	11 October 1998	13 December 1998	10
2	9 January 2000	12 March 2000	10
3	4 January 2001	11 March 2001	10
