= The Masked Singer (British TV series) series 2 =

Season of television series

The Masked Singer
- Series 2
- Starring: Mo Gilligan; Davina McCall; Rita Ora; Jonathan Ross
- Hosted by: Joel Dommett
- No. of contestants: 12
- Winner: Joss Stone as "Sausage"
- Runner-up: Ne-Yo as "Badger"
- No. of episodes: 8

Release
- Original network: ITV
- Original release: 26 December 2020 – 13 February 2021

Series chronology
- ← Previous; Series 1 Next → Series 3

The second series of the British version of The Masked Singer premiered on ITV on 26 December 2020, following a "The Story So Far" recap episode which aired on 19 December, and concluded on 13 February 2021. The series was won by singer Joss Stone as "Sausage", with singer Ne-Yo finishing second as "Badger", and singer Aston Merrygold placing third as "Robin".

== Production ==
On 25 January 2020, it was announced that the show would be returning for a second series. On 30 April 2020, it was reported that they were considering filming the new series without an audience due to the COVID-19 pandemic in the United Kingdom. It was later announced on 17 August 2020 that filming would begin on 14 September with safety precautions in place.

== Panellists and host ==
Series 2 panellists and host

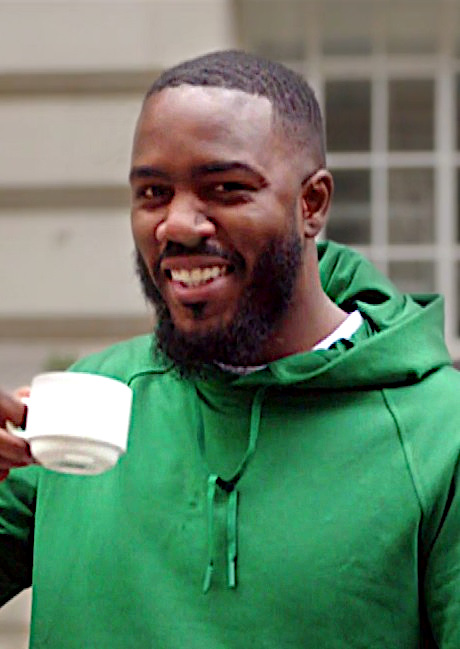
Mo Gilligan

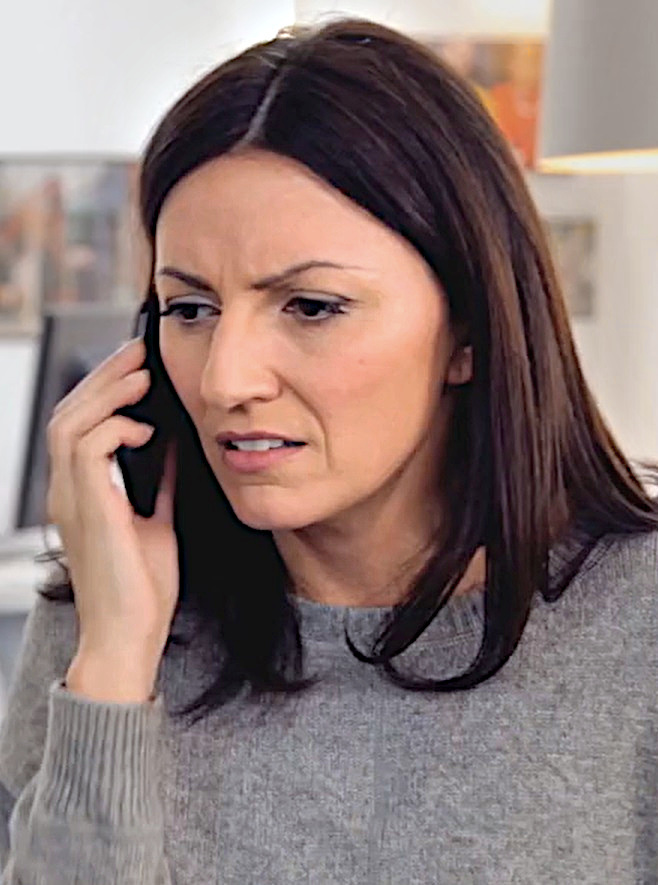
Davina McCall

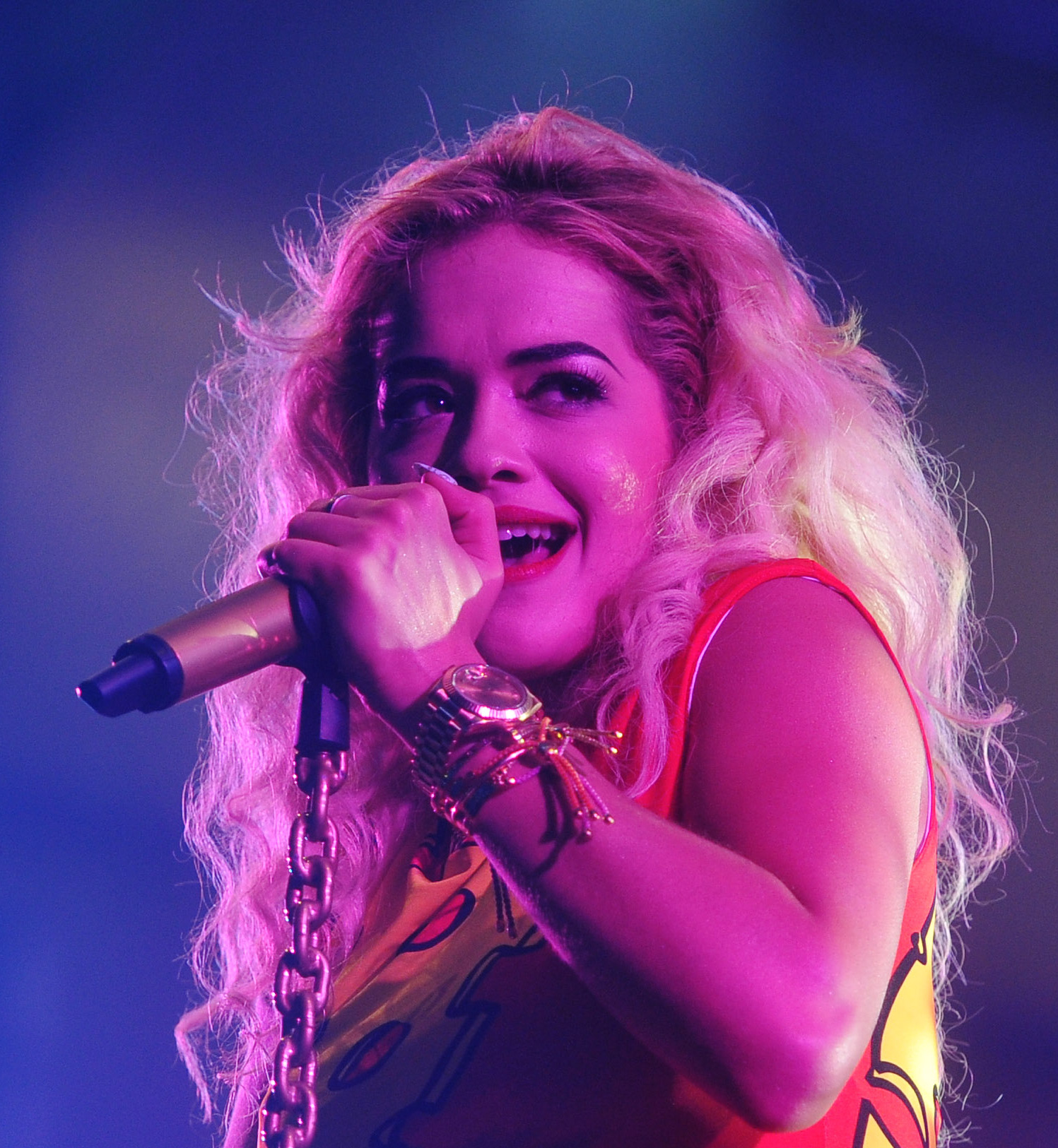
Rita Ora

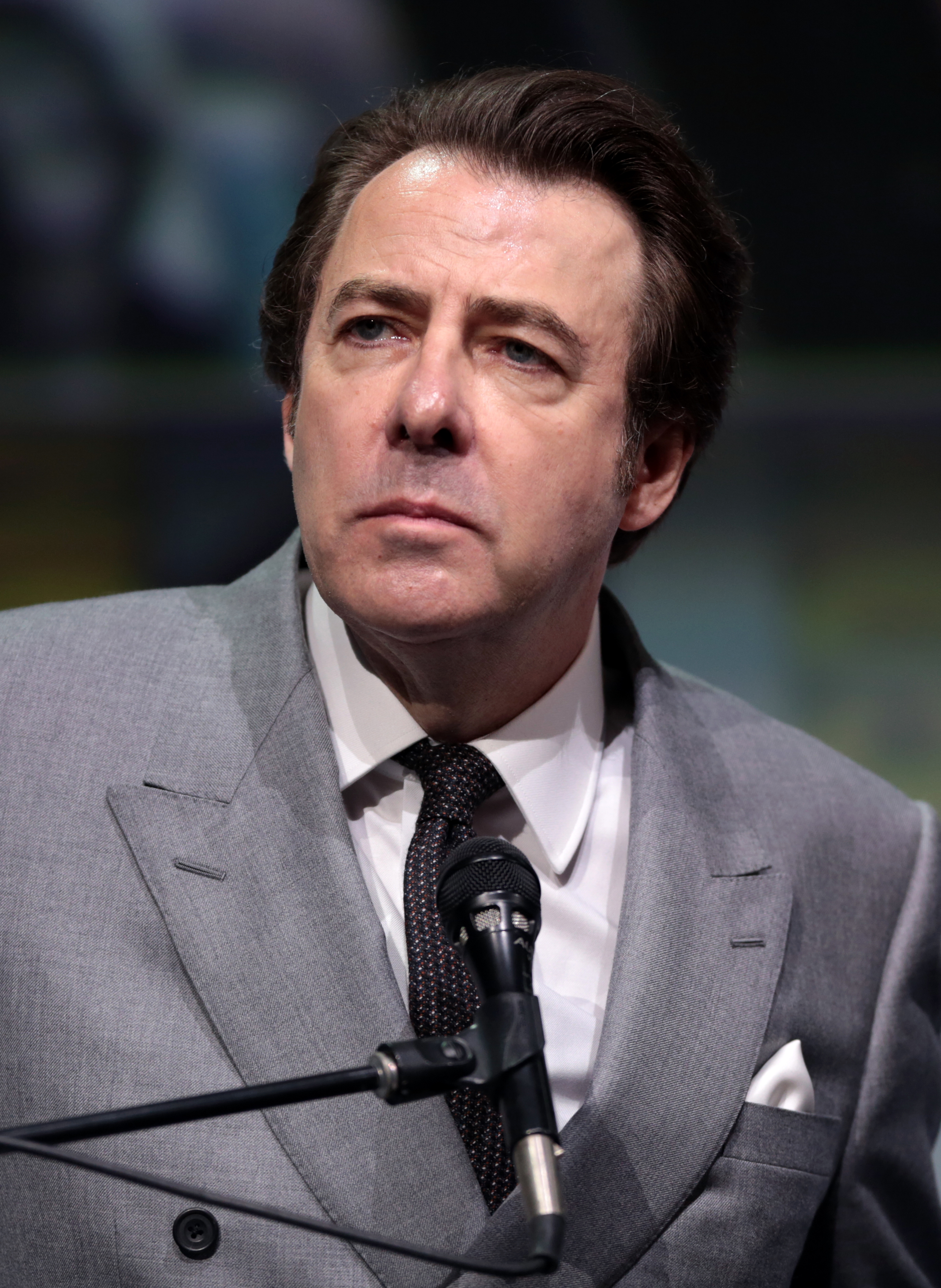
Jonathan Ross

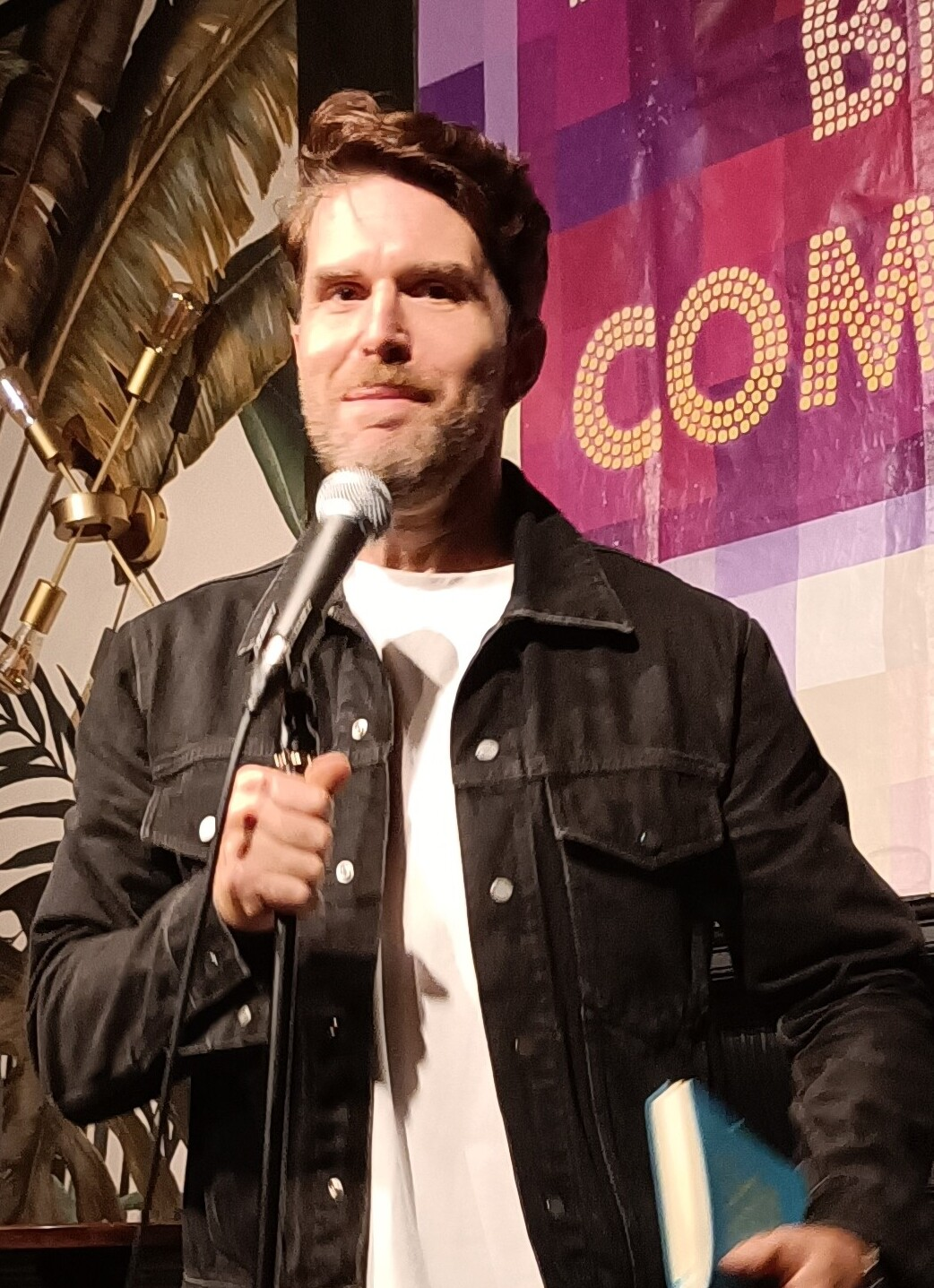
Joel Dommett

Following the announcement of the series, it was confirmed by ITV that Jonathan Ross, Davina McCall and Rita Ora would all return to the panel for the second series. It was also confirmed that Joel Dommett would also return as host.

On 19 August 2020, it was announced that British comedian Mo Gilligan would replace Ken Jeong on the panel for series two, due to travel restrictions from COVID-19 preventing his participation.

Guest panellists included Alan Carr in the sixth episode, Matt Lucas in the seventh episode, and series one winner, Nicola Roberts, in the eighth episode.

== Contestants ==
A 10-second teaser revealing the first two costumes was released in November 2020. The series has 12 contestants.

Results
| Stage name | Celebrity | Occupation(s) | Episodes | | | | | | | |
| Stage name | Celebrity | Occupation(s) | 1 | 2 | 3 | 4 | 5 | 6 | 7 | 8 |
|---|---|---|---|---|---|---|---|---|---|---|
| Sausage | Joss Stone | Singer | WIN | | RISK | | SAFE | SAFE | SAFE | WINNER |
| Badger | Ne-Yo | Singer | RISK | | SAFE | | SAFE | SAFE | SAFE | RUNNER-UP |
| Robin | Aston Merrygold | Singer | WIN | | SAFE | | SAFE | SAFE | SAFE | THIRD |
| Harlequin | Gabrielle | Singer | | RISK | | SAFE | SAFE | SAFE | OUT | |
| Dragon | Sue Perkins | Comedian | WIN | | SAFE | | RISK | RISK | OUT | |
| Blob | Lenny Henry | Comedian | | WIN | | SAFE | SAFE | OUT | | |
| Viking | Morten Harket | Singer | | WIN | | RISK | SAFE | OUT | | |
| Bush Baby | John Thomson | Comedian | | WIN | | SAFE | OUT | | | |
| Grandfather Clock | Glenn Hoddle | Football Player | | RISK | | OUT | | | | |
| Swan | Martine McCutcheon | Actress/Singer | RISK | | OUT | | | | | |
| Seahorse | Mel B | Singer/TV Personality | | OUT | | | | | | |
| Alien | Sophie Ellis-Bextor | Singer | OUT | | | | | | | |

The masked singer won their face-off and remained in the competition.
The masked singer was safe from elimination.
The masked singer was in the bottom three/two, but was not eliminated.
The masked singer was eliminated from the competition and unmasked upon their elimination.
The masked singer did not perform.
The masked singer won the competition.
The masked singer finished second.
The masked singer finished third.
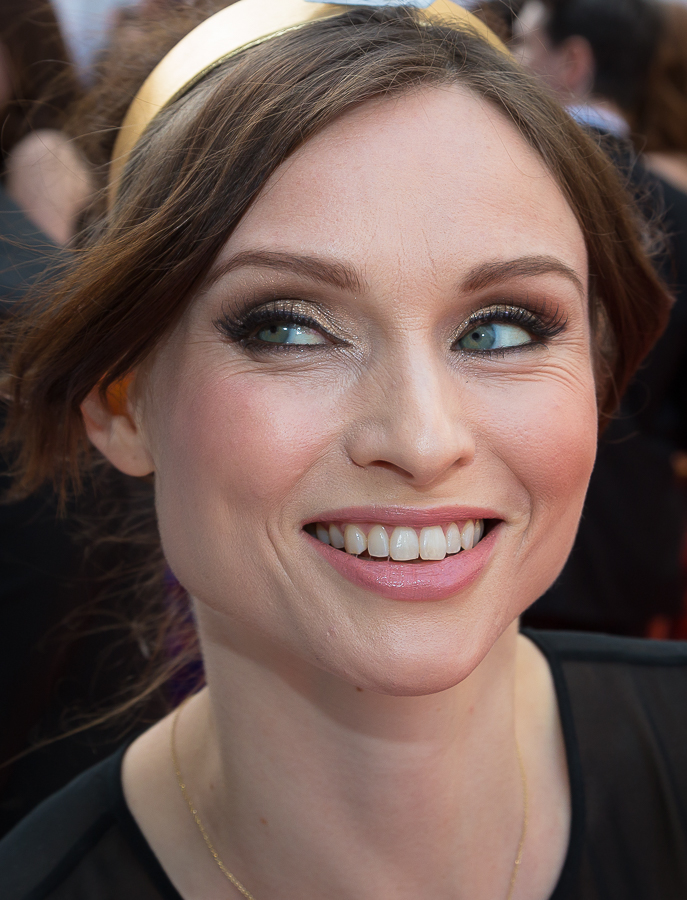
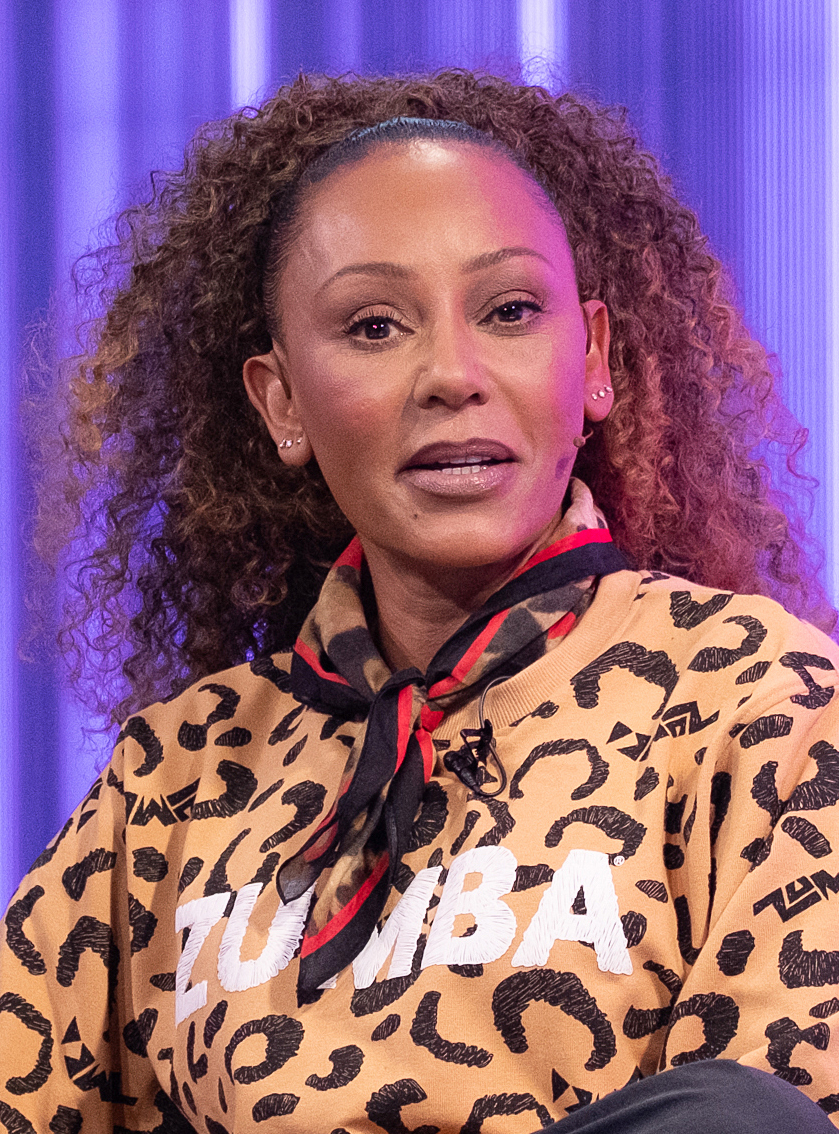
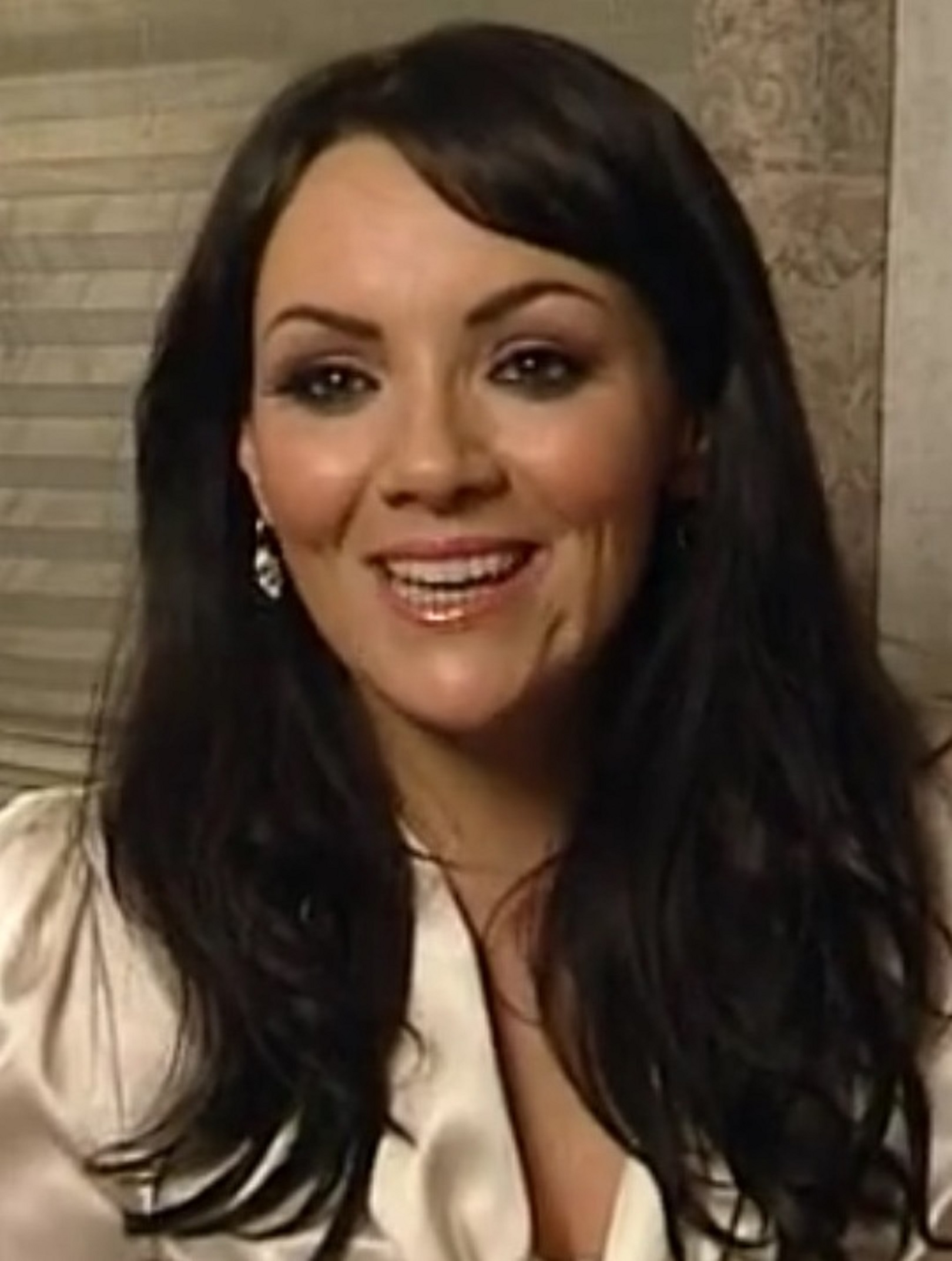
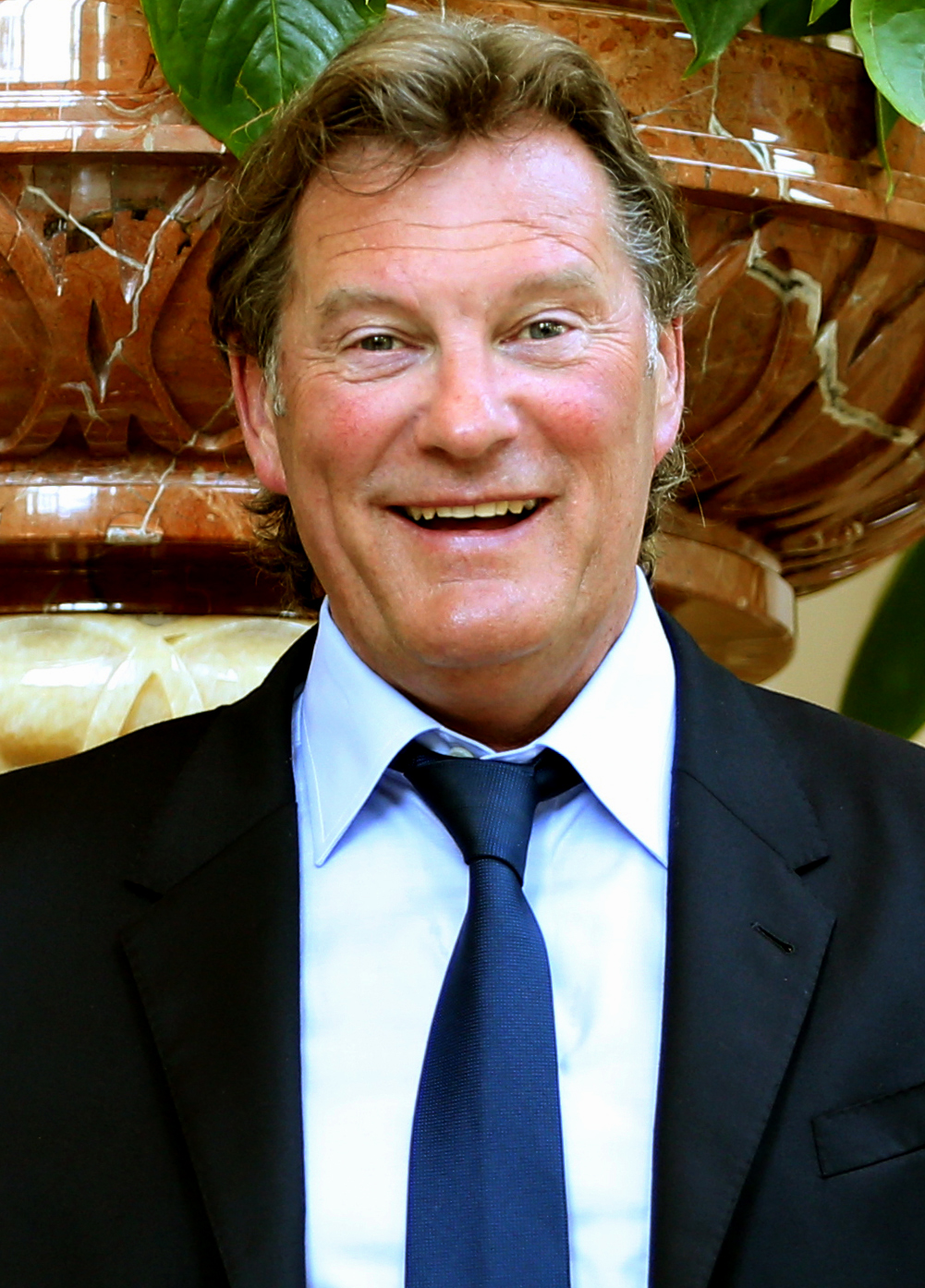
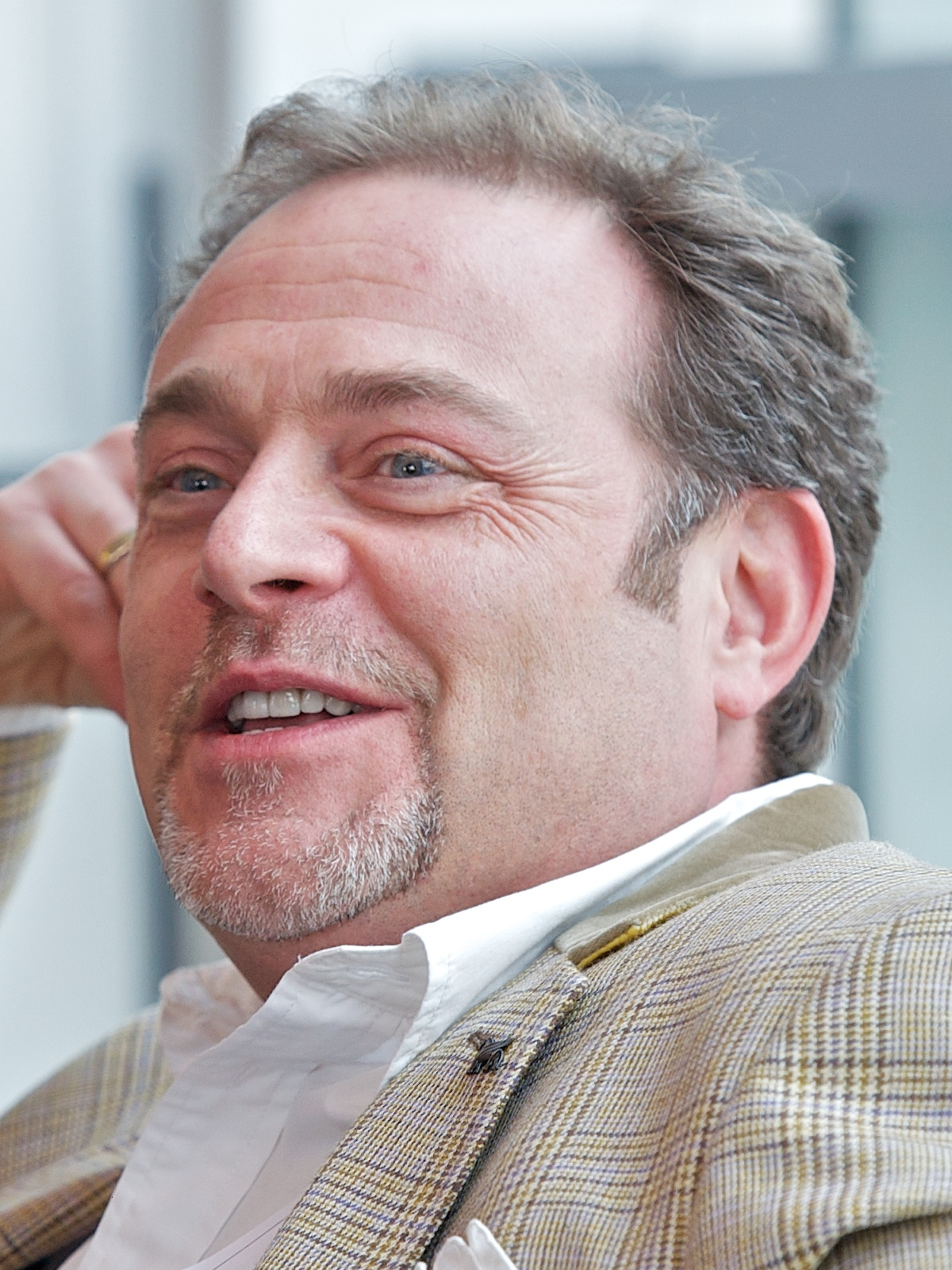
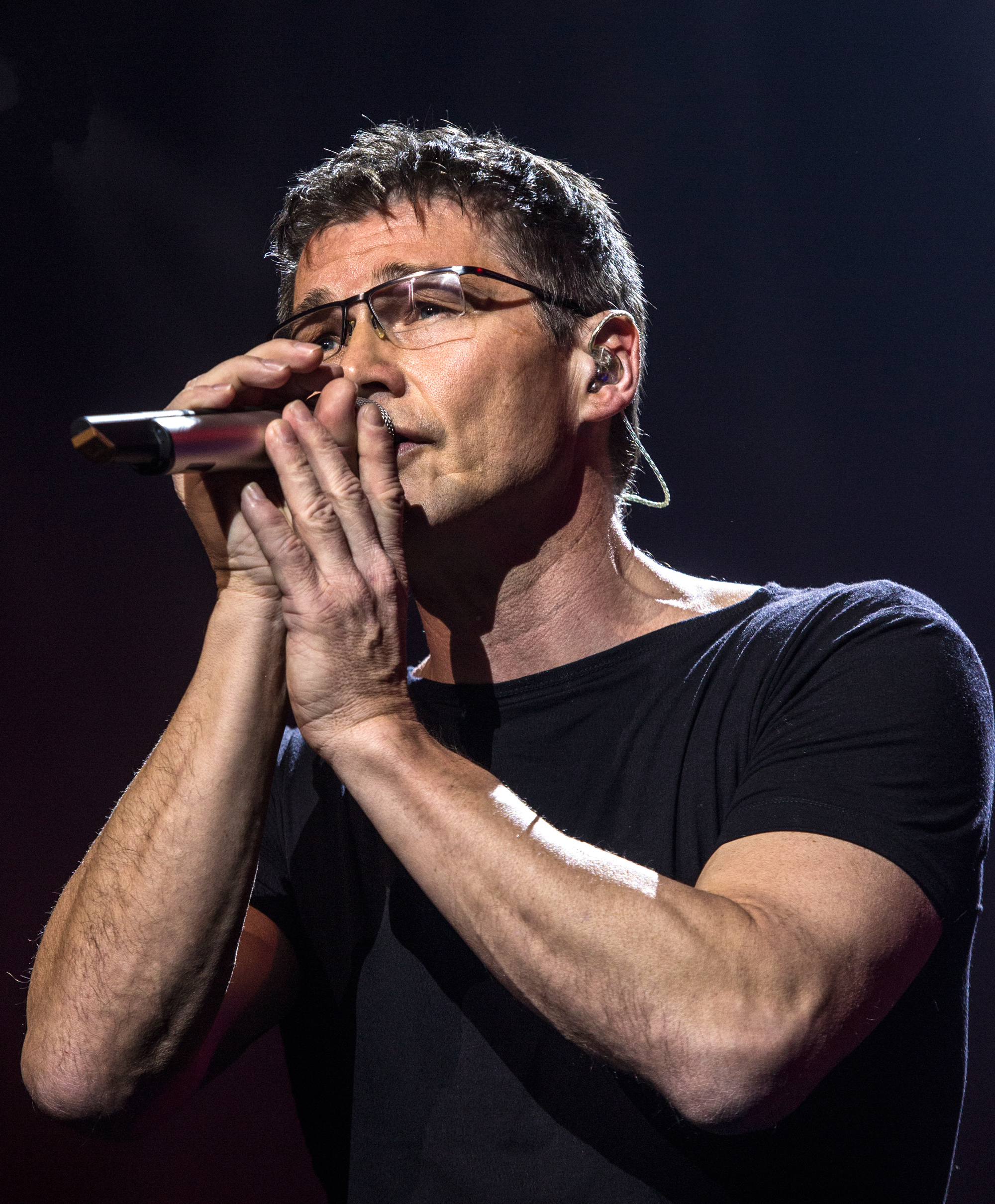
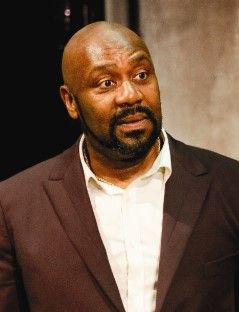
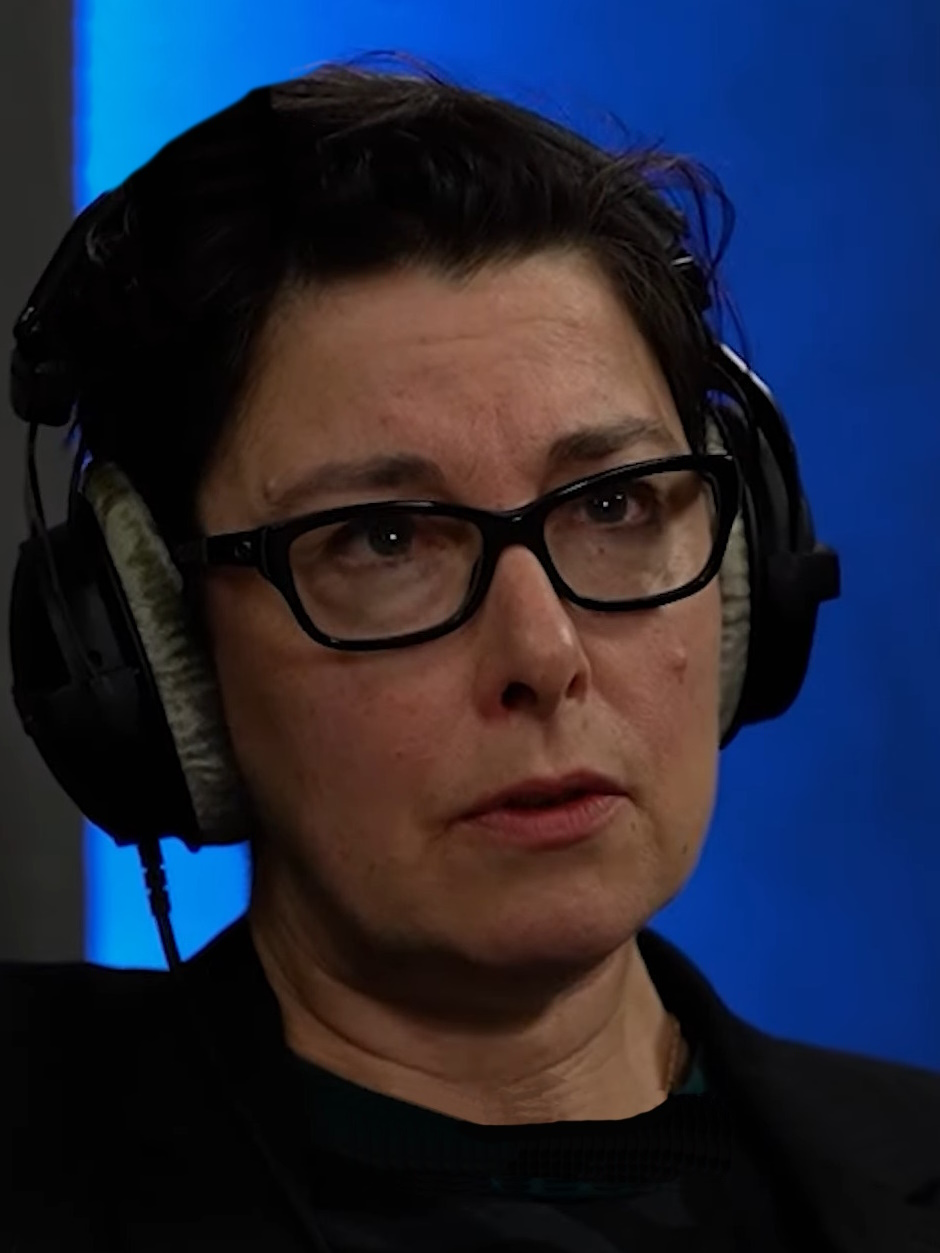
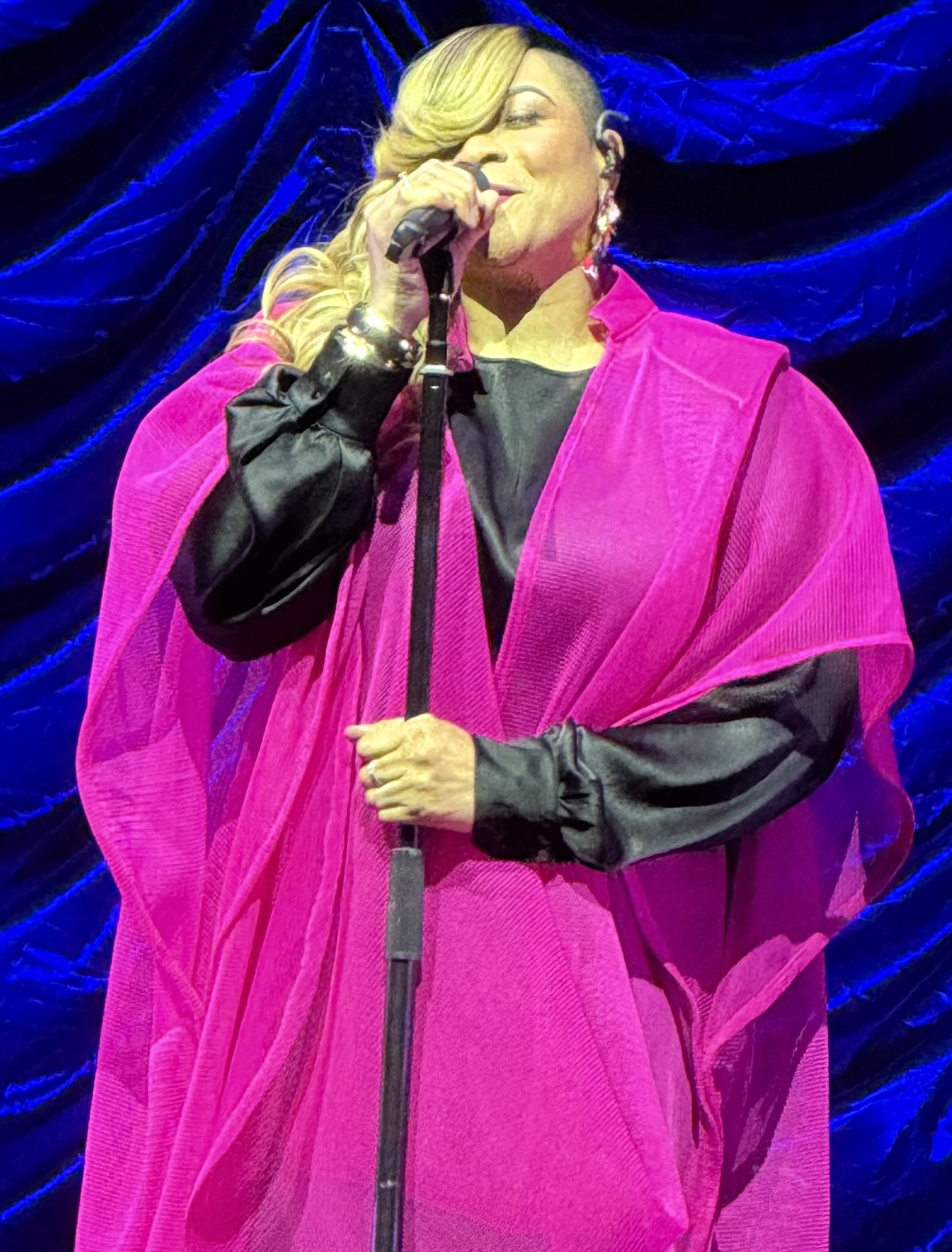
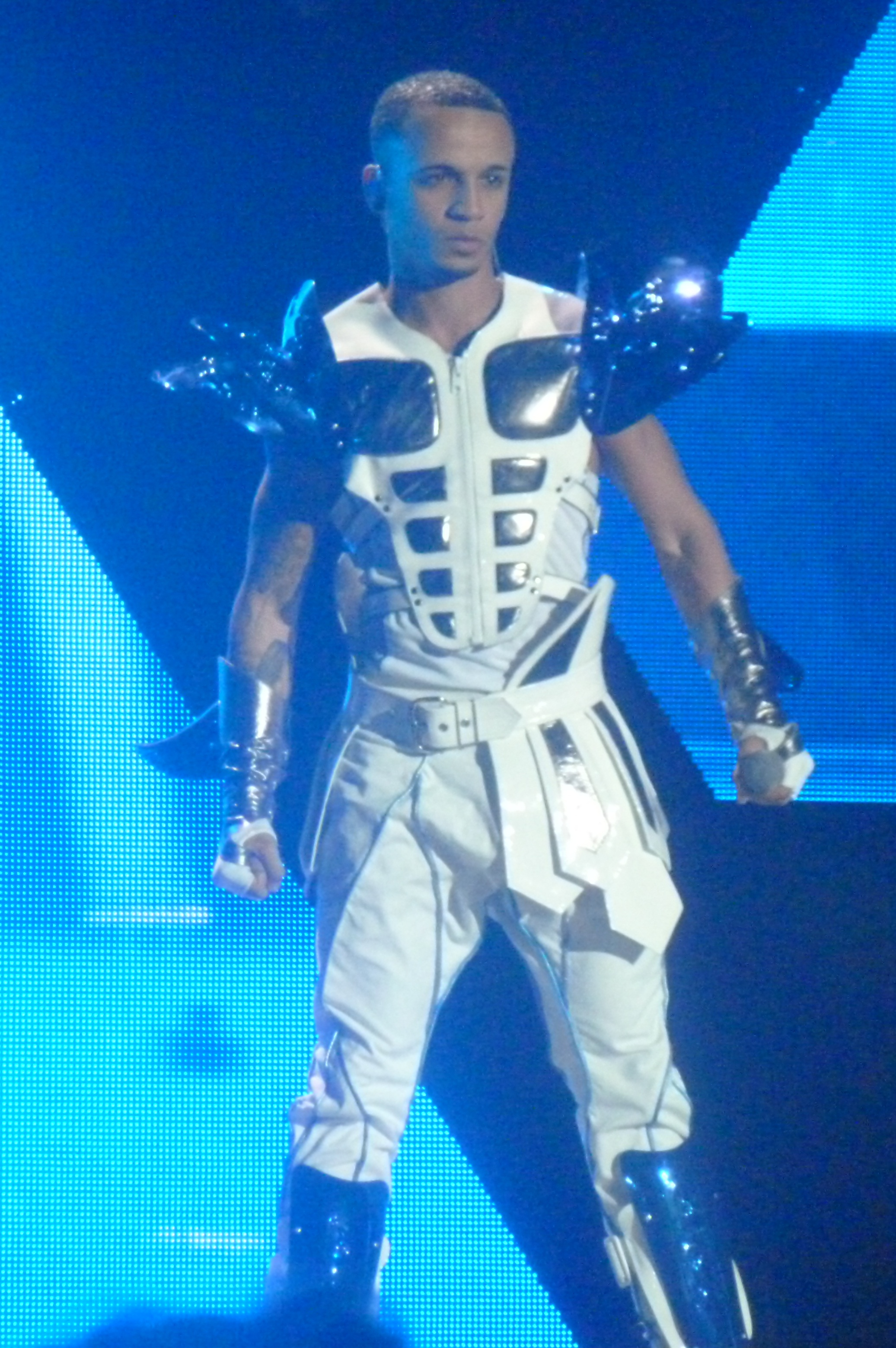
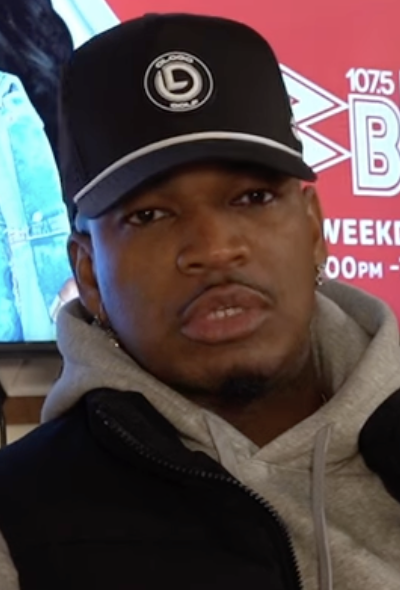
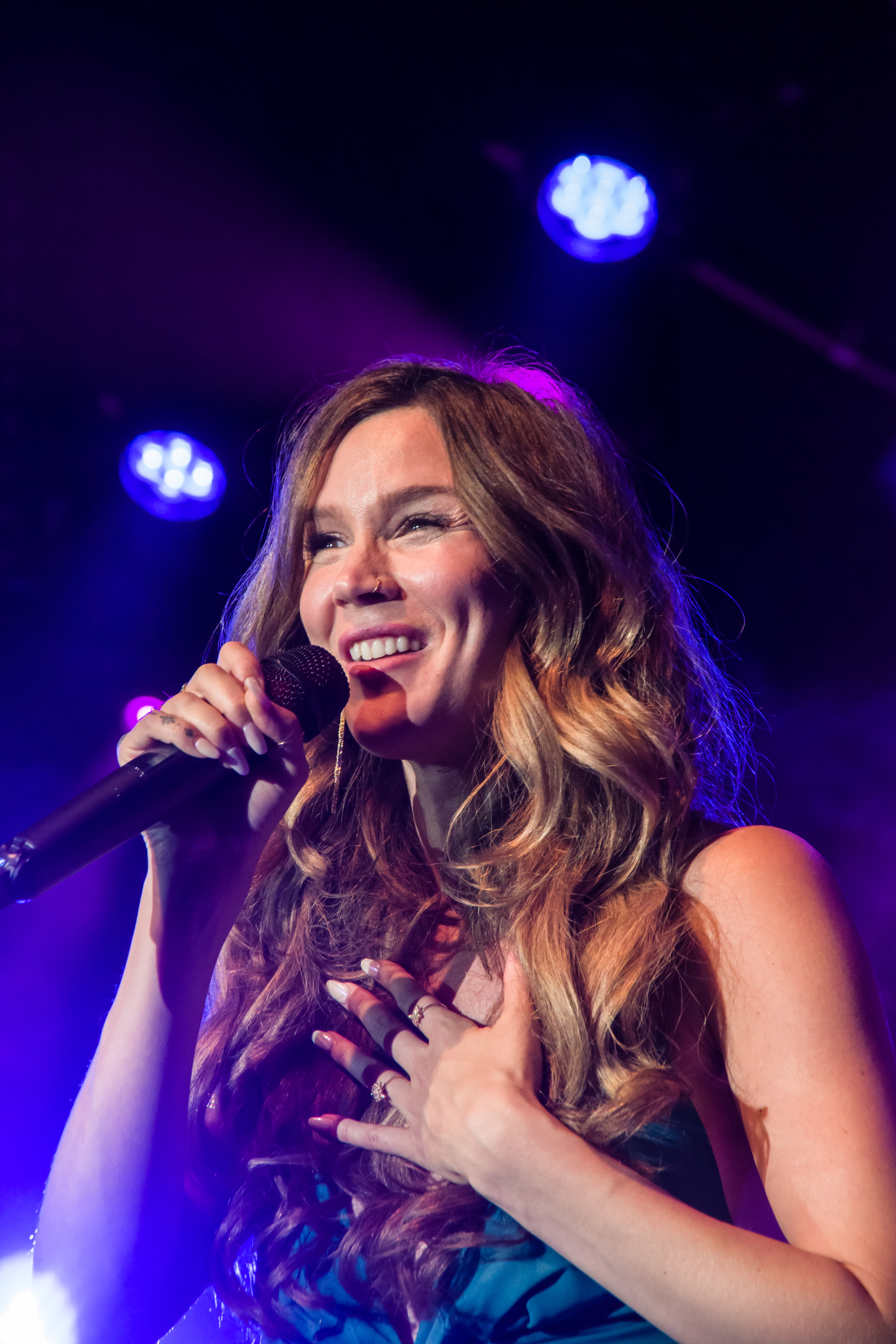
The celebrities who competed in the second series of The Masked Singer, pictured in order of elimination (L–R):
Sophie Ellis-Bextor ("Alien"), Mel B ("Seahorse"), Martine McCutcheon ("Swan"), Glenn Hoddle ("Grandfather Clock"), John Thomson ("Bush Baby"), Morten Harket ("Viking"), Lenny Henry ("Blob"), Sue Perkins ("Dragon"), Gabrielle ("Harlequin"), Aston Merrygold ("Robin"), Ne-Yo ("Badger"), and Joss Stone ("Sausage")

== Episodes ==
=== Episode 1 (26 December) ===
Performances on the first episode
| # | Stage name | Song | Identity | Result |
|---|---|---|---|---|
| 1 | Robin | "Can't Stop the Feeling!" by Justin Timberlake | undisclosed | WIN |
| 2 | Alien | "Don't Start Now" by Dua Lipa | Sophie Ellis-Bextor | OUT |
| 3 | Swan | "That Don't Impress Me Much" by Shania Twain | undisclosed | RISK |
| 4 | Dragon | "You've Got a Friend in Me" from Toy Story | undisclosed | WIN |
| 5 | Sausage | "Skin" by Rag'n'Bone Man | undisclosed | WIN |
| 6 | Badger | "Feeling Good" by Nina Simone | undisclosed | RISK |

=== Episode 2 (2 January) ===
Performances on the second episode
| # | Stage name | Song | Identity | Result |
|---|---|---|---|---|
| 1 | Harlequin | "Diamonds" by Rihanna | undisclosed | RISK |
| 2 | Blob | "Uptown Funk" by Mark Ronson feat. Bruno Mars | undisclosed | WIN |
| 3 | Seahorse | "Can't Get You Out of My Head" by Kylie Minogue | Mel B | OUT |
| 4 | Viking | "Songbird" by Fleetwood Mac | undisclosed | WIN |
| 5 | Bush Baby | "Delilah" by Tom Jones | undisclosed | WIN |
| 6 | Grandfather Clock | "Rock Around the Clock" by Bill Haley & His Comets | undisclosed | RISK |

=== Episode 3 (9 January) ===
Performances on the third episode
| # | Stage name | Song | Result | |
|---|---|---|---|---|
| 1 | Sausage | "And I Am Telling You I'm Not Going" from Dreamgirls | RISK | |
| 2 | Robin | "Dance Monkey" by Tones and I | SAFE | |
| 3 | Swan | "I Am What I Am" by Gloria Gaynor | RISK | |
| 4 | Badger | "I Don't Want to Miss a Thing" by Aerosmith | SAFE | |
| 5 | Dragon | "Reach" by S Club 7 | SAFE | |
| Sing-Off | | | Identity | Result |
| 1 | Sausage | "Don't Let Go (Love)" by En Vogue | undisclosed | SAFE |
| 2 | Swan | "Black Velvet" by Alannah Myles | Martine McCutcheon | OUT |

=== Episode 4 (16 January) ===
Performances on the fourth episode
| # | Stage name | Song | Result | |
|---|---|---|---|---|
| 1 | Grandfather Clock | "You Make Me Feel So Young" by Frank Sinatra | RISK | |
| 2 | Harlequin | "Smile" by Nat King Cole | SAFE | |
| 3 | Bush Baby | "A Little Less Conversation" by Elvis Presley | SAFE | |
| 4 | Viking | "Watermelon Sugar" by Harry Styles | RISK | |
| 5 | Blob | "Word Up!" by Cameo | SAFE | |
| Sing-Off | | | Identity | Result |
| 1 | Grandfather Clock | "Can't Smile Without You" by Barry Manilow | Glenn Hoddle | OUT |
| 2 | Viking | "Crazy" by Seal | undisclosed | SAFE |

=== Episode 5 (23 January) ===
Performances on the fifth episode
| # | Stage name | Clue song | Identity | Result |
|---|---|---|---|---|
| 1 | Blob | "Hotel Room Service" by Pitbull | undisclosed | SAFE |
| 2 | Sausage | "All Around the World" by Lisa Stansfield | undisclosed | SAFE |
| 3 | Viking | "Take On Me" by A-ha | undisclosed | SAFE |
| 4 | Badger | "Because of You" by Kelly Clarkson | undisclosed | SAFE |
| 5 | Bush Baby | "Release Me" by Engelbert Humperdinck | John Thomson | OUT |
| 6 | Dragon | "All by Myself" by Celine Dion | undisclosed | RISK |
| 7 | Harlequin | "Fast Car" by Tracy Chapman | undisclosed | SAFE |
| 8 | Robin | "Rockin' Robin" by Michael Jackson | undisclosed | SAFE |

=== Episode 6 (30 January) ===
- Group number: "That's Not My Name" by The Ting Tings
- Guest panelist: Alan Carr

Performances on the sixth episode
| # | Stage name | Song | Identity | Result |
|---|---|---|---|---|
| 1 | Dragon | "The Shoop Shoop Song (It's in His Kiss)" by Cher | undisclosed | RISK |
| 2 | Harlequin | "Falling" by Harry Styles | undisclosed | SAFE |
| 3 | Blob | "Addicted to Love" by Robert Palmer | Lenny Henry | OUT |
| 4 | Robin | "Closer" by Ne-Yo | undisclosed | SAFE |
| 5 | Badger | "Wrecking Ball" by Miley Cyrus | undisclosed | SAFE |
| 6 | Viking | "The Scientist" by Coldplay | Morten Harket | OUT |
| 7 | Sausage | "I Will Survive" by Gloria Gaynor | undisclosed | SAFE |

=== Episode 7: Semi-final (6 February) ===
- Group number: "Superstar" by Jamelia
- Guest panelist: Matt Lucas

First performances on the seventh episode
| # | Stage name | Song | Identity | Result |
|---|---|---|---|---|
| 1 | Badger | "Grease" by Frankie Valli | undisclosed | SAFE |
| 2 | Harlequin | "Everything I Wanted" by Billie Eilish | undisclosed | SAFE |
| 3 | Robin | "Thinking Out Loud" by Ed Sheeran | undisclosed | SAFE |
| 4 | Sausage | "Good as Hell" by Lizzo | undisclosed | SAFE |
| 5 | Dragon | "Make You Feel My Love" by Adele | Sue Perkins | OUT |

Second performances on the seventh episode
| # | Stage name | Song | Identity | Result |
|---|---|---|---|---|
| 1 | Badger | "Smells Like Teen Spirit" by Nirvana | undisclosed | SAFE |
| 2 | Harlequin | "Sweet but Psycho" by Ava Max | Gabrielle | OUT |
| 3 | Robin | "Footloose" by Kenny Loggins | undisclosed | SAFE |
| 4 | Sausage | "Rise Up" by Andra Day | undisclosed | SAFE |

=== Episode 8: Final (13 February) ===
- Group number: "I'm Coming Out" by Diana Ross
- Guest panelist: Nicola Roberts

First performances on the eighth episode
| # | Stage name | Song | Identity | Result |
|---|---|---|---|---|
| 1 | Robin | "For Once in My Life" by Stevie Wonder | Aston Merrygold | THIRD PLACE |
| 2 | Badger | "Believer" by Imagine Dragons | undisclosed | SAFE |
| 3 | Sausage | "I Wanna Dance with Somebody (Who Loves Me)" by Whitney Houston | undisclosed | SAFE |

Second performances on the eighth episode
| # | Stage name | Song of the series | Identity | Result |
|---|---|---|---|---|
| 1 | Badger | "Wrecking Ball" by Miley Cyrus | Ne-Yo | RUNNER-UP |
| 2 | Sausage | "Rise Up" by Andra Day | Joss Stone | WINNER |

== Ratings ==
Official ratings are taken from BARB, utilising the four-screen dashboard which includes viewers who watched the programme on laptops, smartphones, and tablets within 7 days of the original broadcast.

| Episode | Date | Official 7 day rating (millions) | Official 28 day rating (millions) | Weekly rank for ITV | Weekly rank for all UK TV |
|---|---|---|---|---|---|
| 1 | 26 December | 5.43 | 5.89 | 7 | Outside top 15 |
| 2 | 2 January | 6.60 | 6.81 | 2 | 7 |
| 3 | 9 January | 7.32 | 7.69 | 1 | 4 |
| 4 | 16 January | 7.34 | 7.52 | 5 | 6 |
| 5 | 23 January | 7.94 | 8.07 | 1 | 1 |
| 6 | 30 January | 8.16 | 8.26 | 1 | 2 |
| 7 | 6 February | 8.44 | 8.58 | 1 | 3 |
| 8 | 13 February | 9.92 | 10.06 | 1 | 1 |
| Series average | 2020/2021 | 7.64 | 7.86 | —N/a | |
