= Same Time, Next Year =

Same Time, Next Year may refer to:

- Same Time, Next Year (play), a 1975 play by Bernard Slade
  - Same Time, Next Year (film), a 1978 film adaptation of the 1975 play starring Ellen Burstyn and Alan Alda
- "Same Time, Next Year", a short story by Neal Shusterman about time travel, part of Bruce Coville's Book of Monsters series
- "Same Time Next Year", a B-side song of Paul McCartney's 1990 single "Put It There"

See also

- This Time Next Year (disambiguation)
