= The Masked Singer (British TV series) series 1 =

Season of television series

The Masked Singer
- Series 1
- Promotional poster for series one featuring "Pharaoh", "Tree", "Monster", "Octopus", "Daisy", and "Fox"
- Starring: Ken Jeong; Davina McCall; Rita Ora; Jonathan Ross
- Hosted by: Joel Dommett
- No. of contestants: 12
- Winner: Nicola Roberts as "Queen Bee"
- Runner-up: Jason Manford as "Hedgehog"
- No. of episodes: 8

Release
- Original network: ITV
- Original release: 4 January – 15 February 2020

Series chronology
- Next → Series 2

The first series of the British version of The Masked Singer premiered on ITV on 4 January 2020, and concluded on 15 February 2020. The series was won by singer Nicola Roberts as "Queen Bee", with comedian Jason Manford finishing second as "Hedgehog", and singer Katherine Jenkins placing third as "Octopus".

== Production ==
On 31 May 2019, it was announced that ITV was producing a local version of the South Korean television singing competition King of Mask Singer, originally broadcast by the Munhwa Broadcasting Corporation, for the British television market. The production is made by British television production company Bandicoot, part of the Argonon Group.

== Panellists and host ==
Series 1 panellists and host

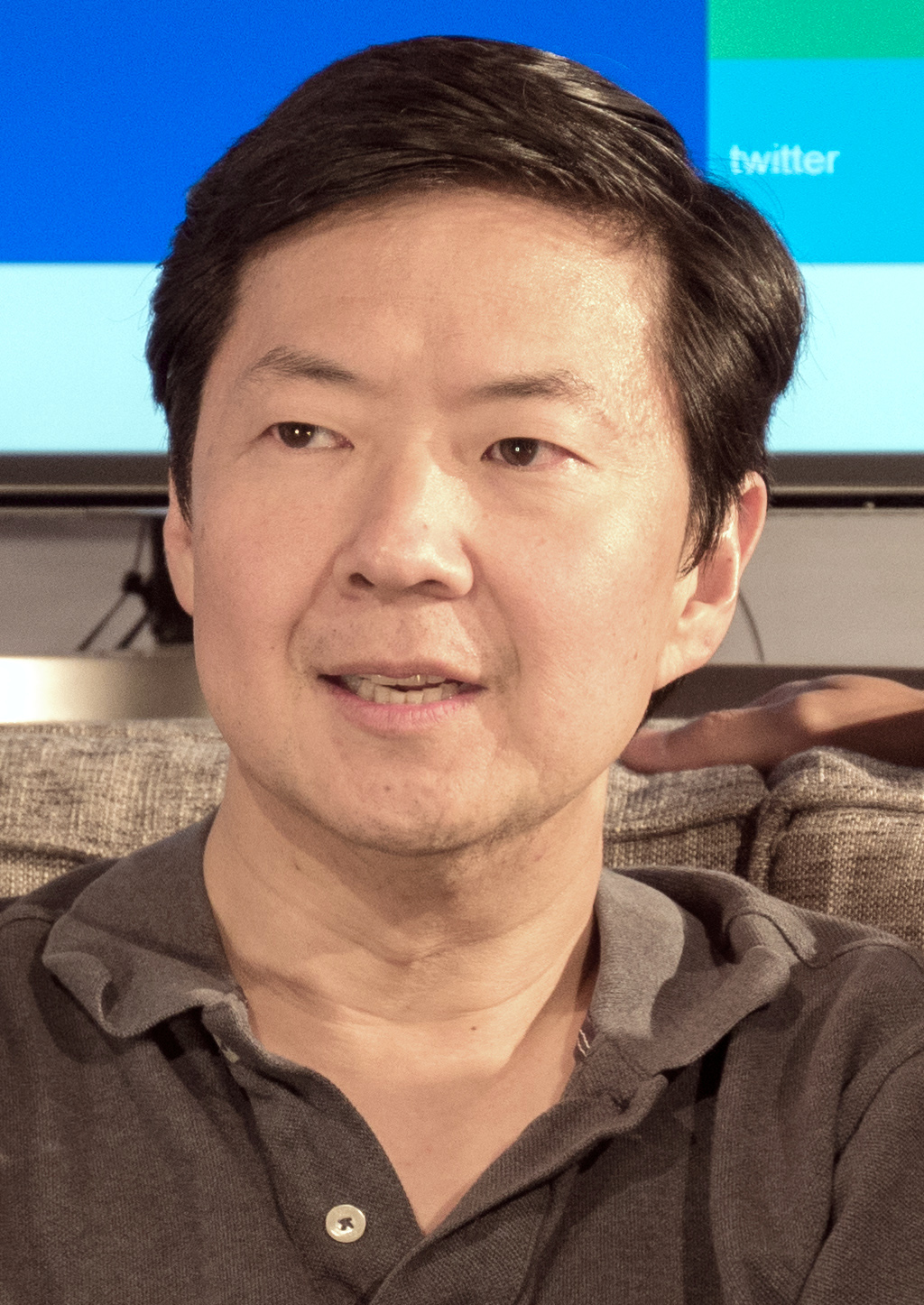
Ken Jeong

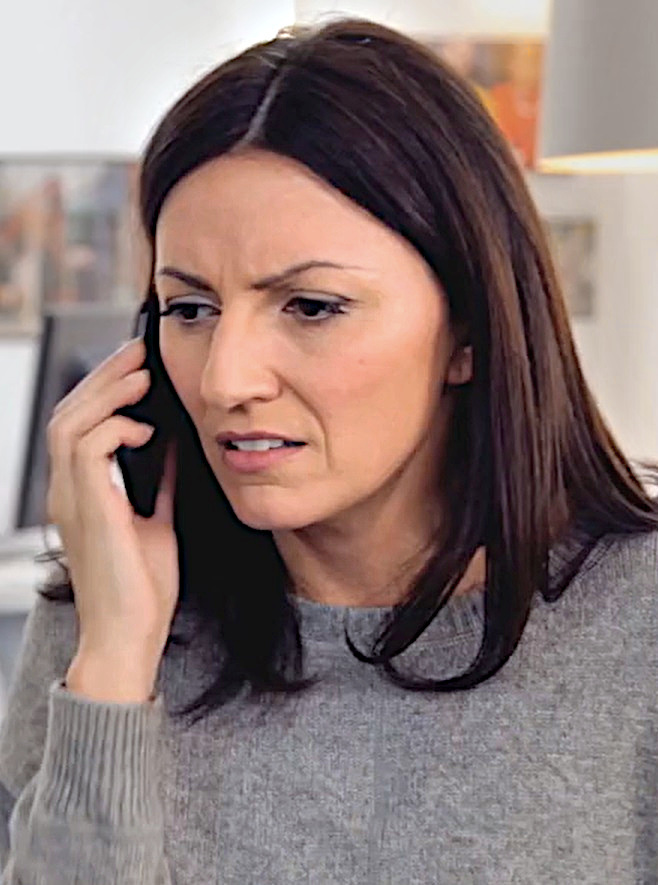
Davina McCall

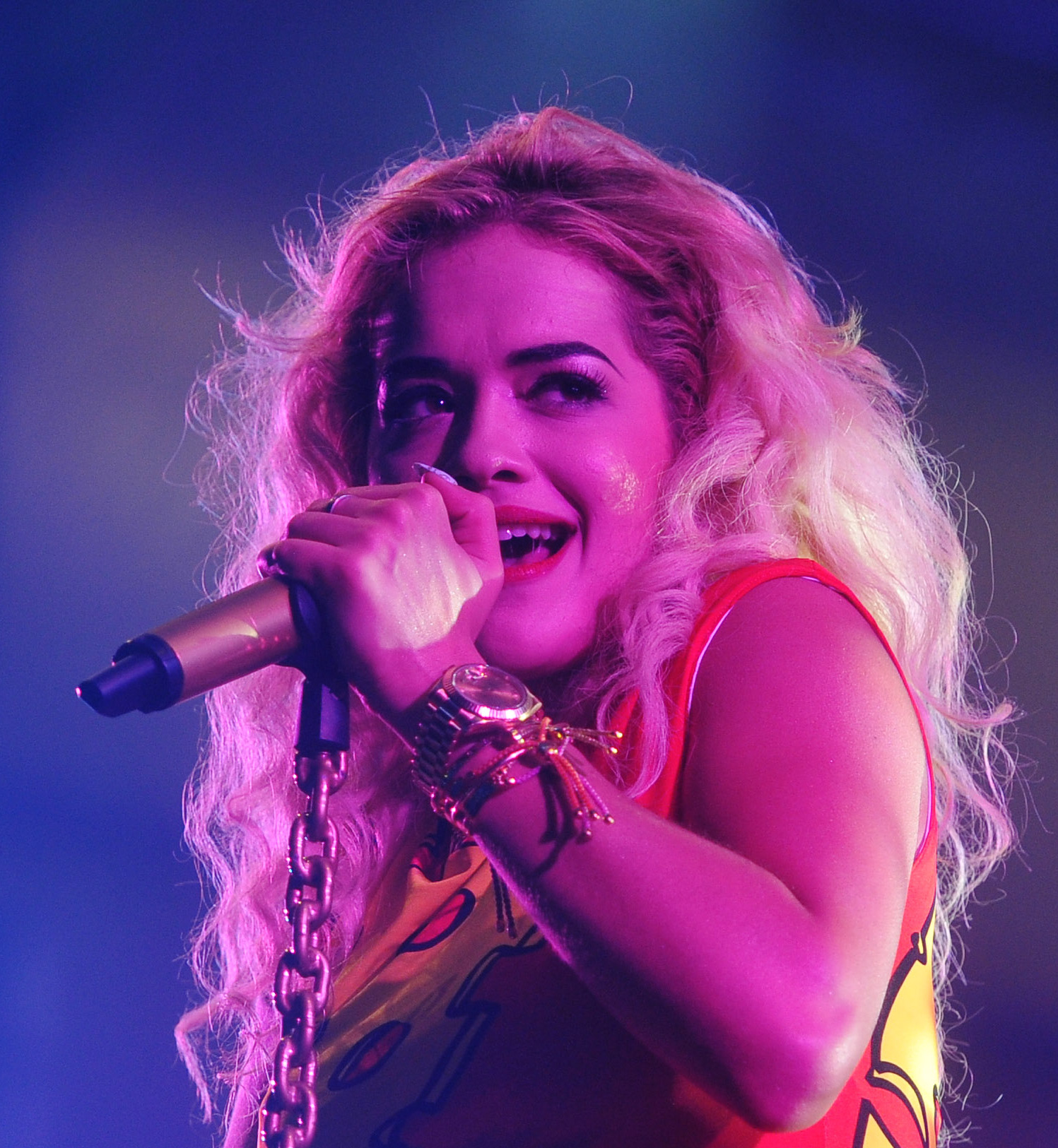
Rita Ora

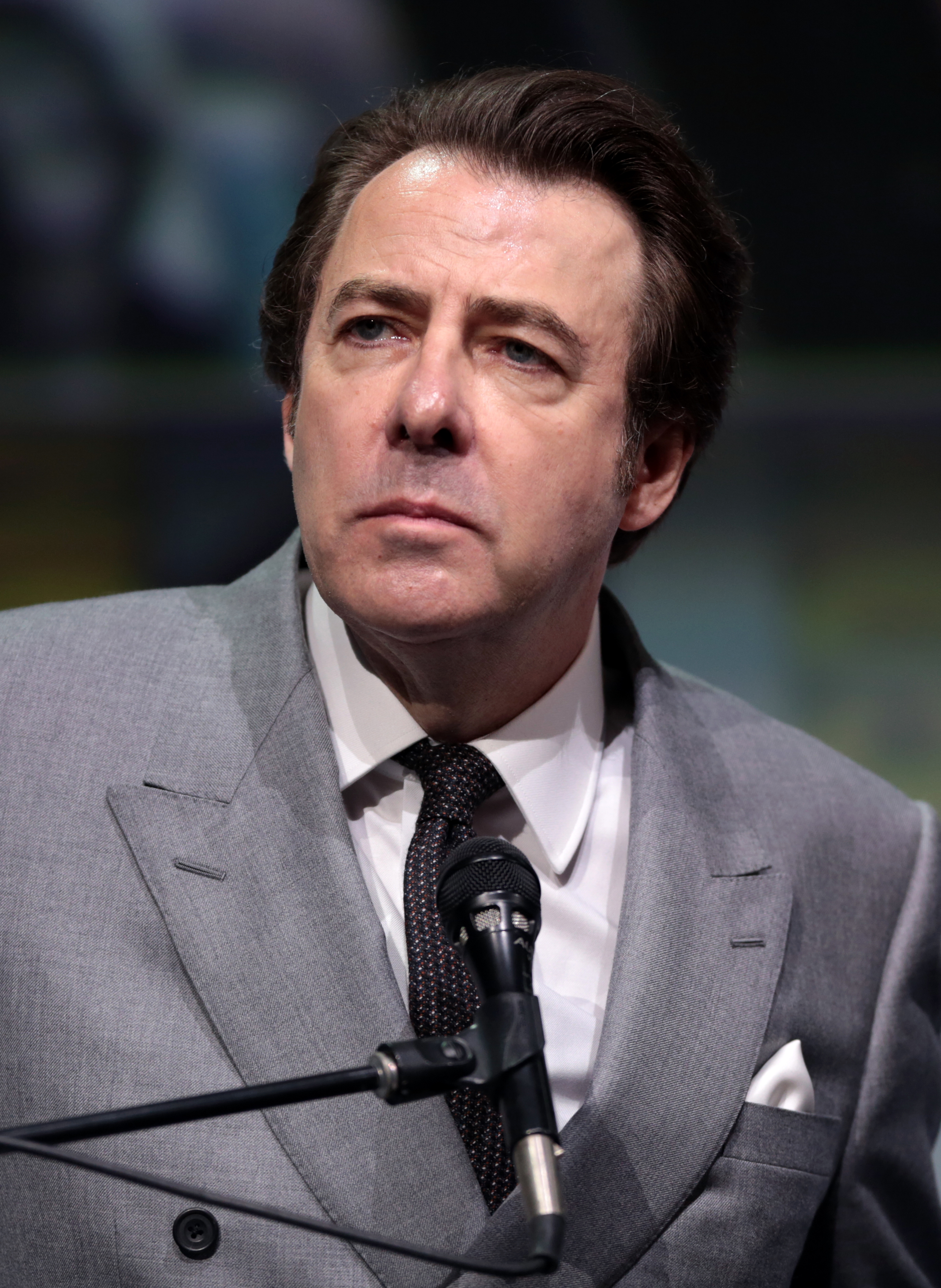
Jonathan Ross

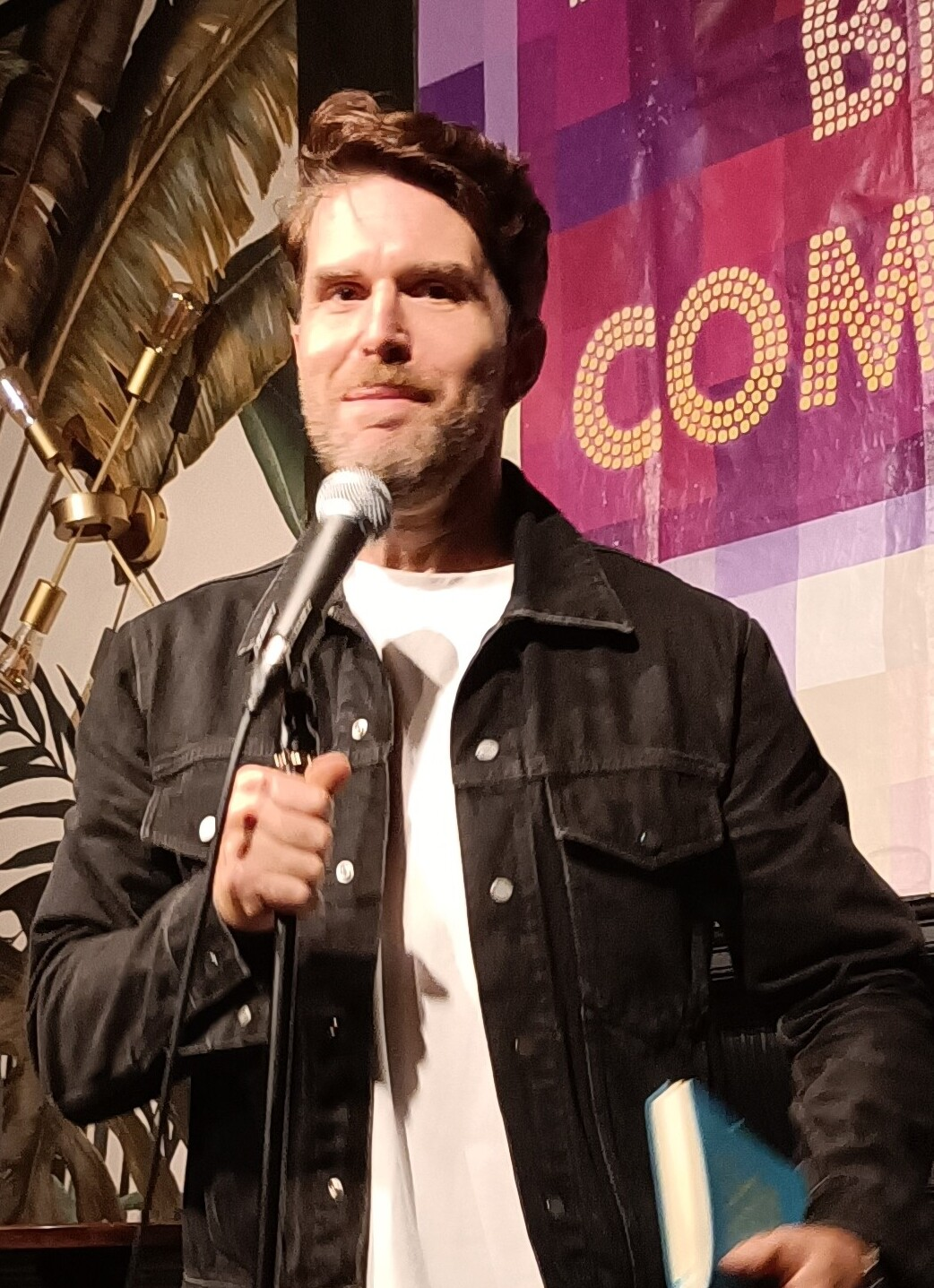
Joel Dommett

Following the announcement of the series, it was confirmed by ITV that the panel would consist of presenter and comedian Jonathan Ross, television presenter Davina McCall, US actor and comedian Ken Jeong (who is also a panellist on the American version of the programme), and singer-songwriter and actress Rita Ora. It was also confirmed that Joel Dommett would host the show.

In episode five, Donny Osmond, who appeared as Peacock in the first American series, took Jeong's place on the panel. In episode six, Sharon Osbourne and daughter Kelly Osbourne, the latter of whom appeared as Ladybug in the second American series, filled in.

== Contestants ==
Results
Stage name	Celebrity	Occupation(s)	Episodes							
Stage name	Celebrity	Occupation(s)	1	2	3	4	5	6	7	8
Queen Bee	Nicola Roberts	Singer	WIN		SAFE		SAFE	SAFE	SAFE	WINNER
Hedgehog	Jason Manford	Comedian/Actor	WIN		SAFE		SAFE	SAFE	SAFE	RUNNER-UP
Octopus	Katherine Jenkins	Singer		WIN		RISK	SAFE	SAFE	SAFE	THIRD
Monster	CeeLo Green	Singer		RISK		SAFE	RISK	SAFE	OUT	
Fox	Denise van Outen	Actress		WIN		SAFE	SAFE	RISK	OUT	
Unicorn	Jake Shears	Singer	WIN		SAFE		SAFE	OUT		
Duck	Skin	Singer	RISK		RISK		SAFE	OUT		
Daisy	Kelis	Singer/Chef		RISK		SAFE	OUT			
Tree	Teddy Sheringham	Footballer		WIN		OUT				
Chameleon	Justin Hawkins	Singer	RISK		OUT					
Pharaoh	Alan Johnson	Politician		OUT						
Butterfly	Patsy Palmer	Actress/DJ	OUT							

The masked singer won their face-off and remained in the competition.
The masked singer was safe from elimination.
The masked singer lost their face-off and was in the bottom three/two, but was not eliminated.
The masked singer was eliminated from the competition and unmasked upon their elimination.
The masked singer did not perform.
The masked singer won the competition.
The masked singer finished second.
The masked singer finished third.
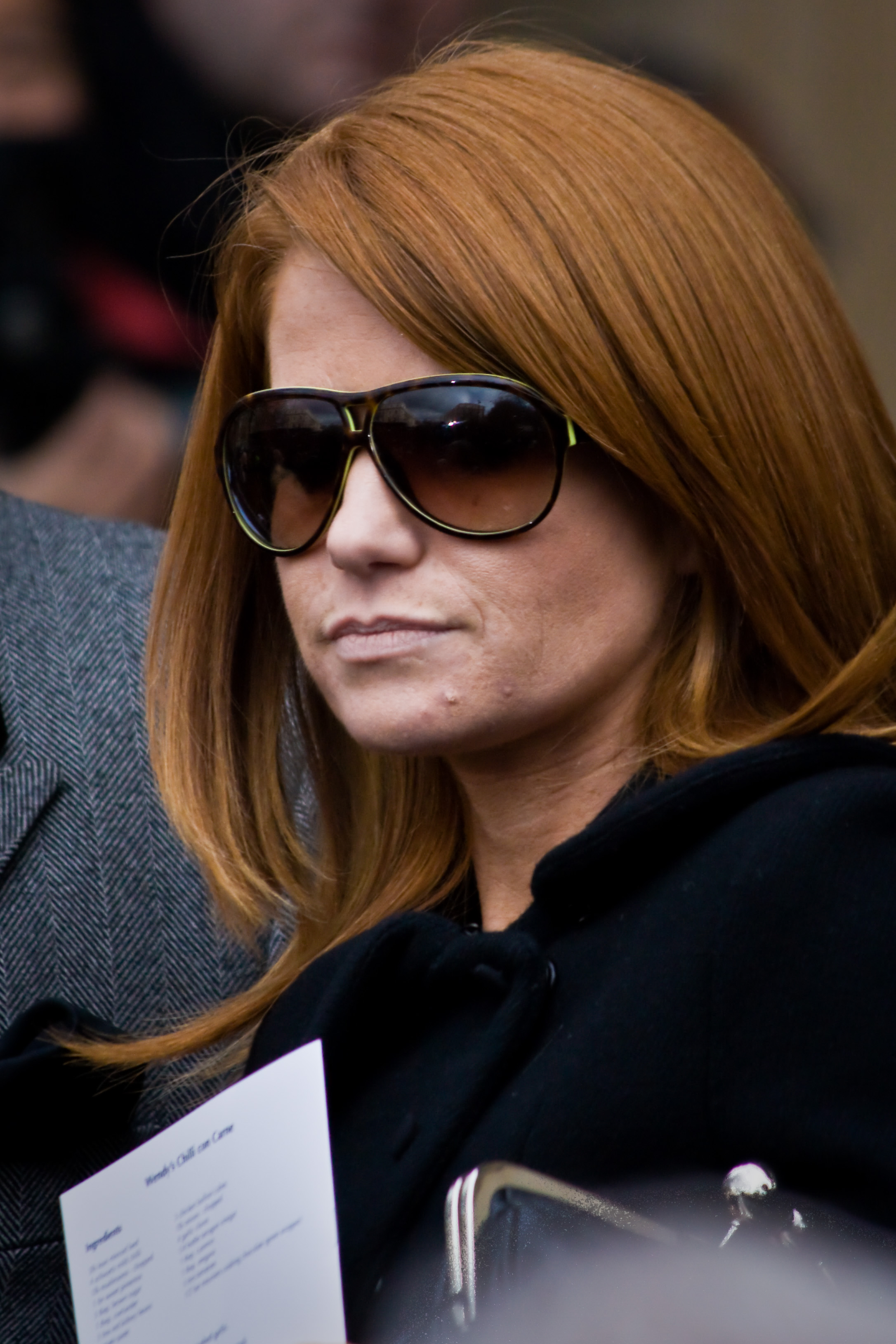
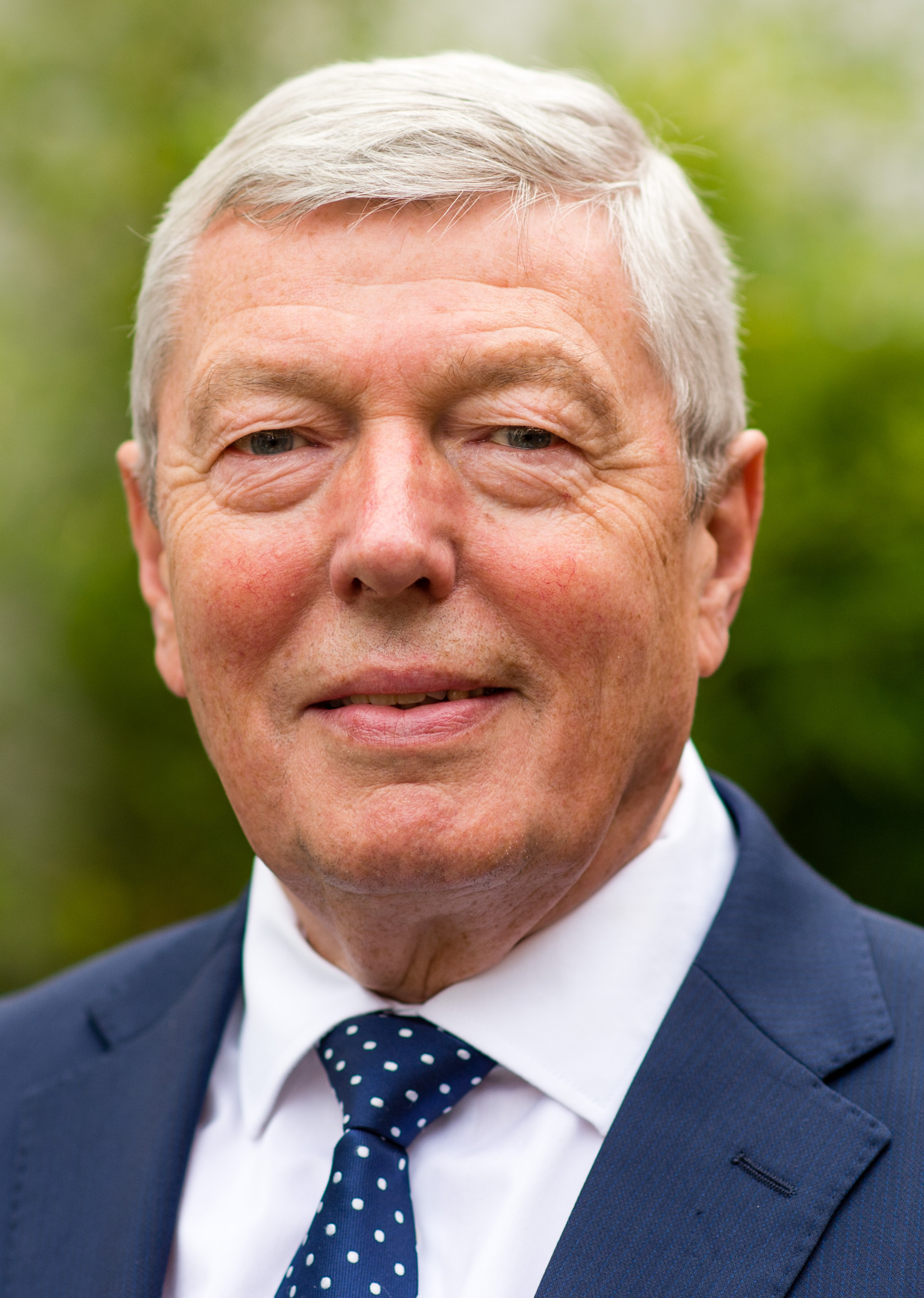
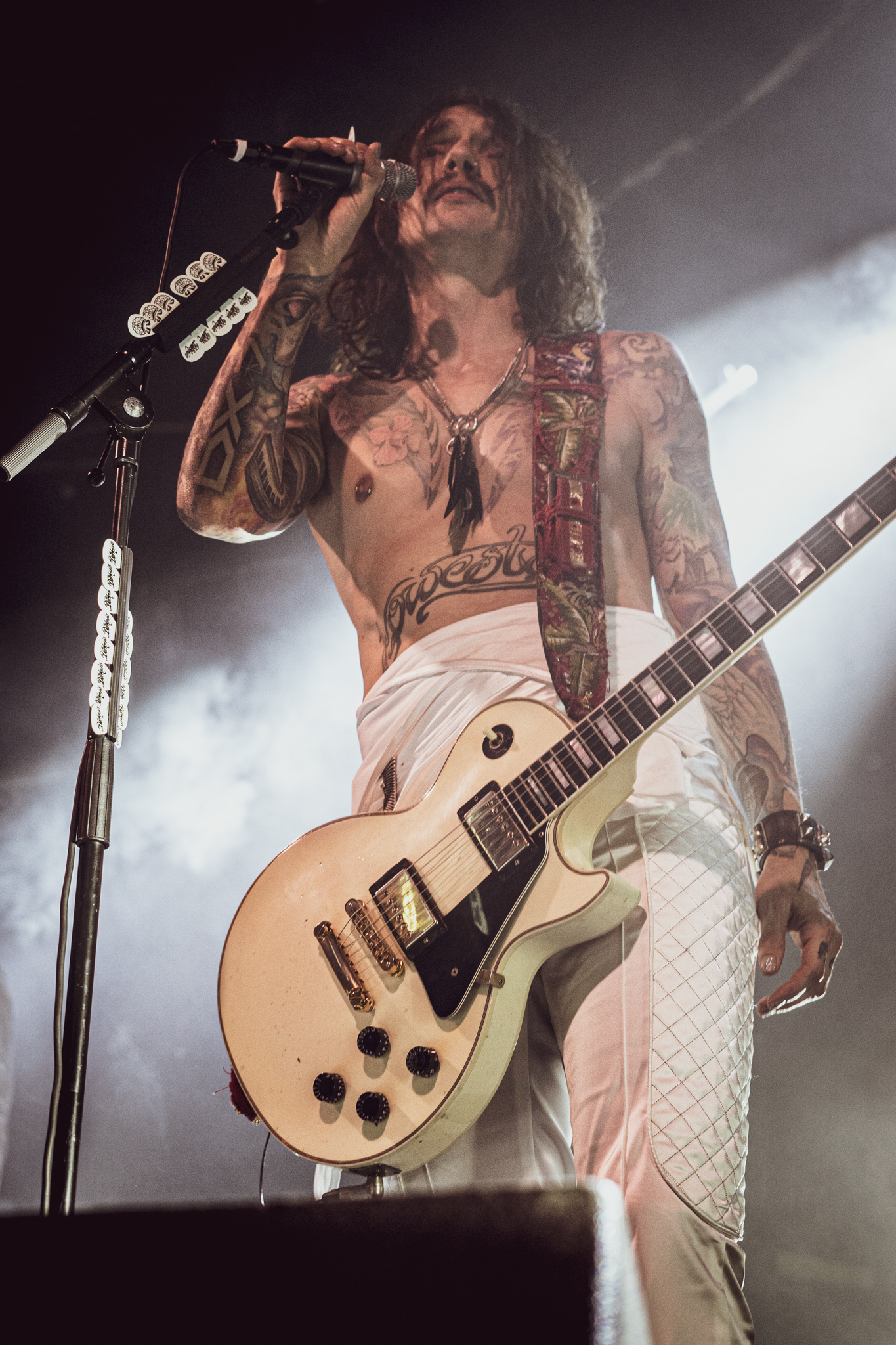
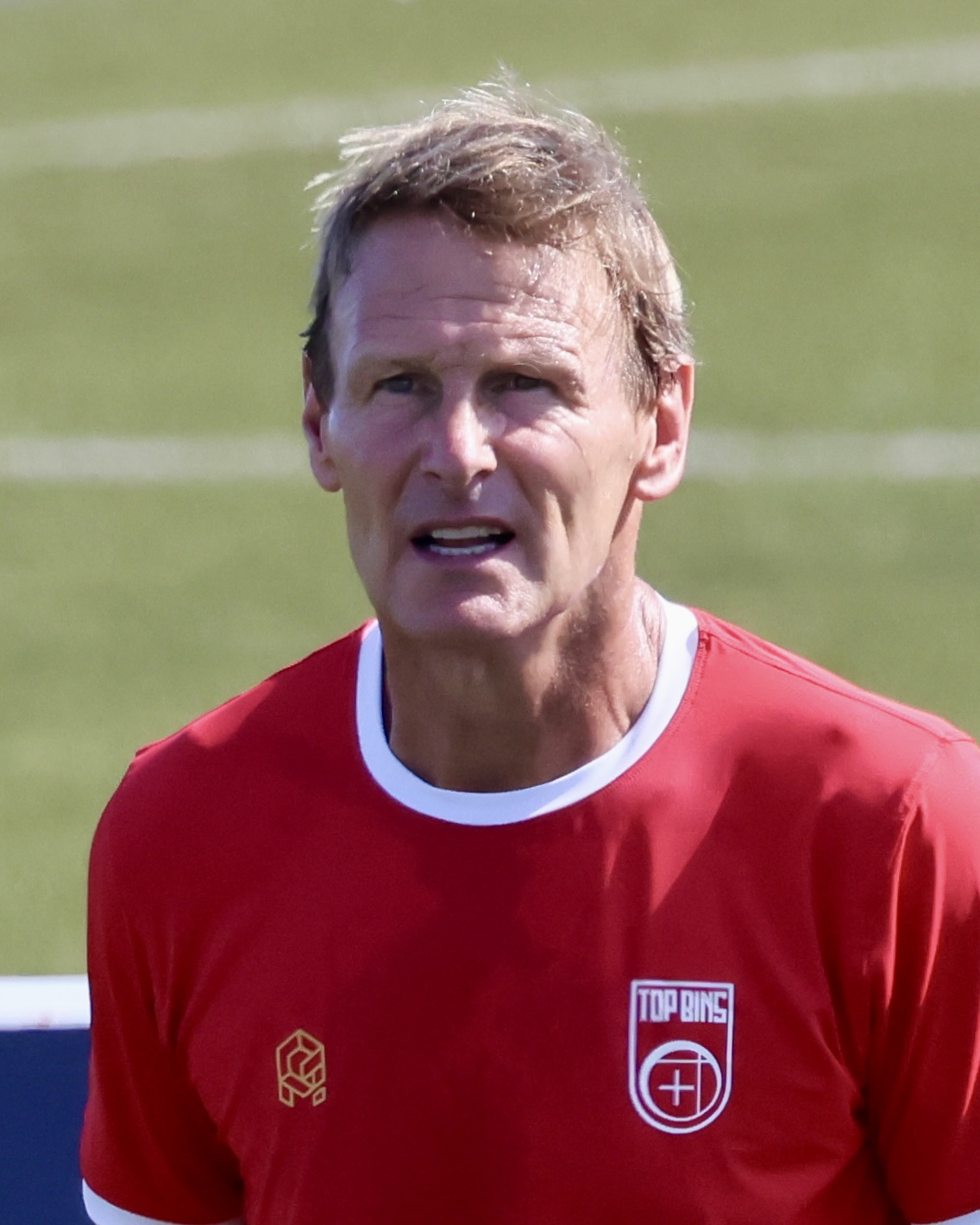
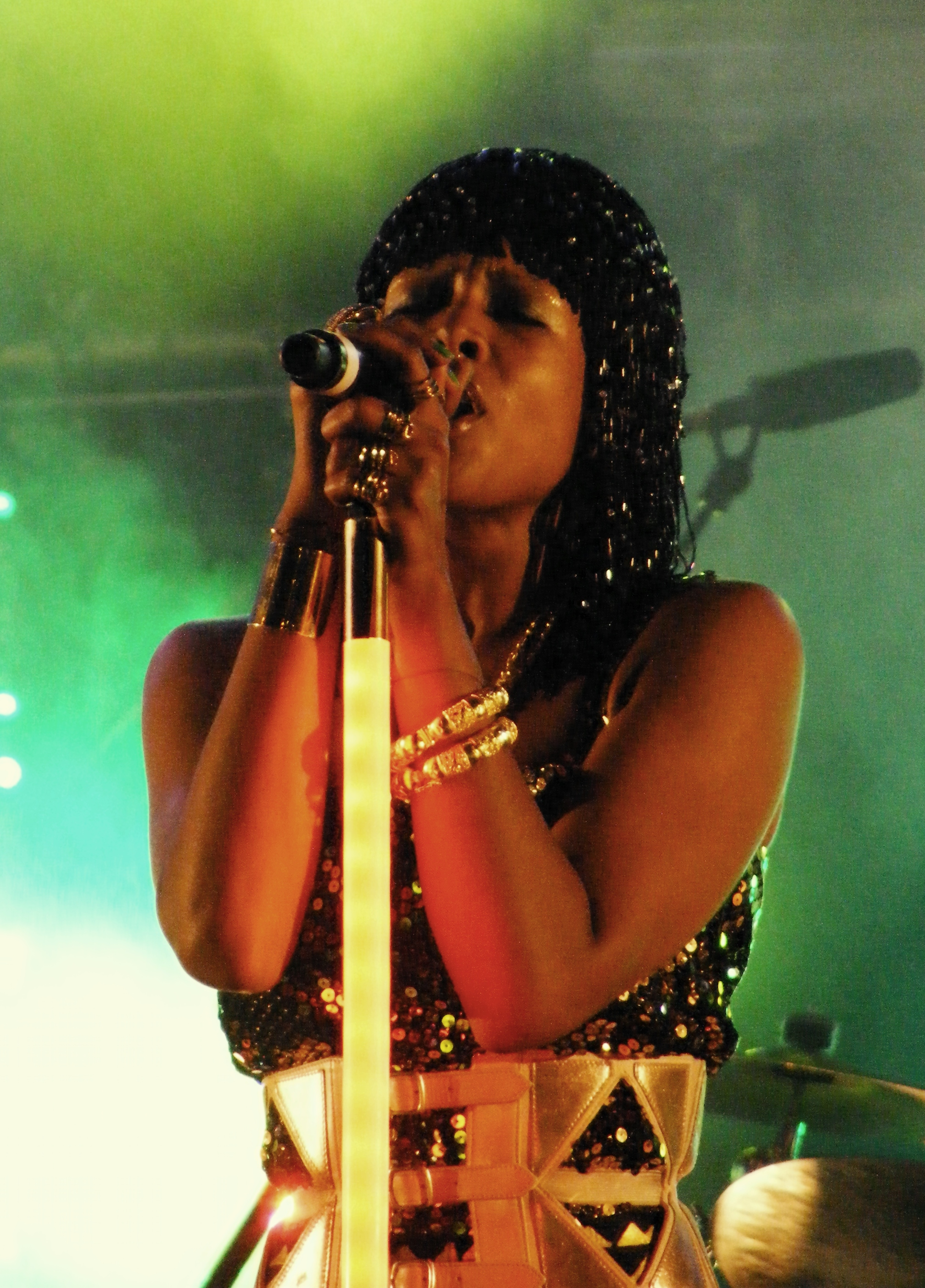
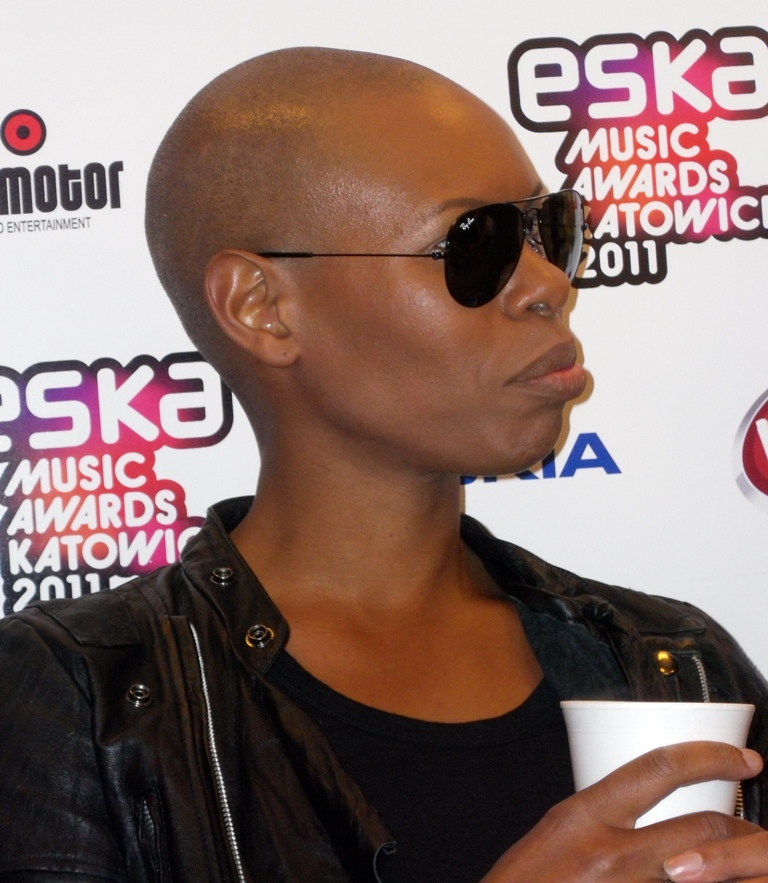
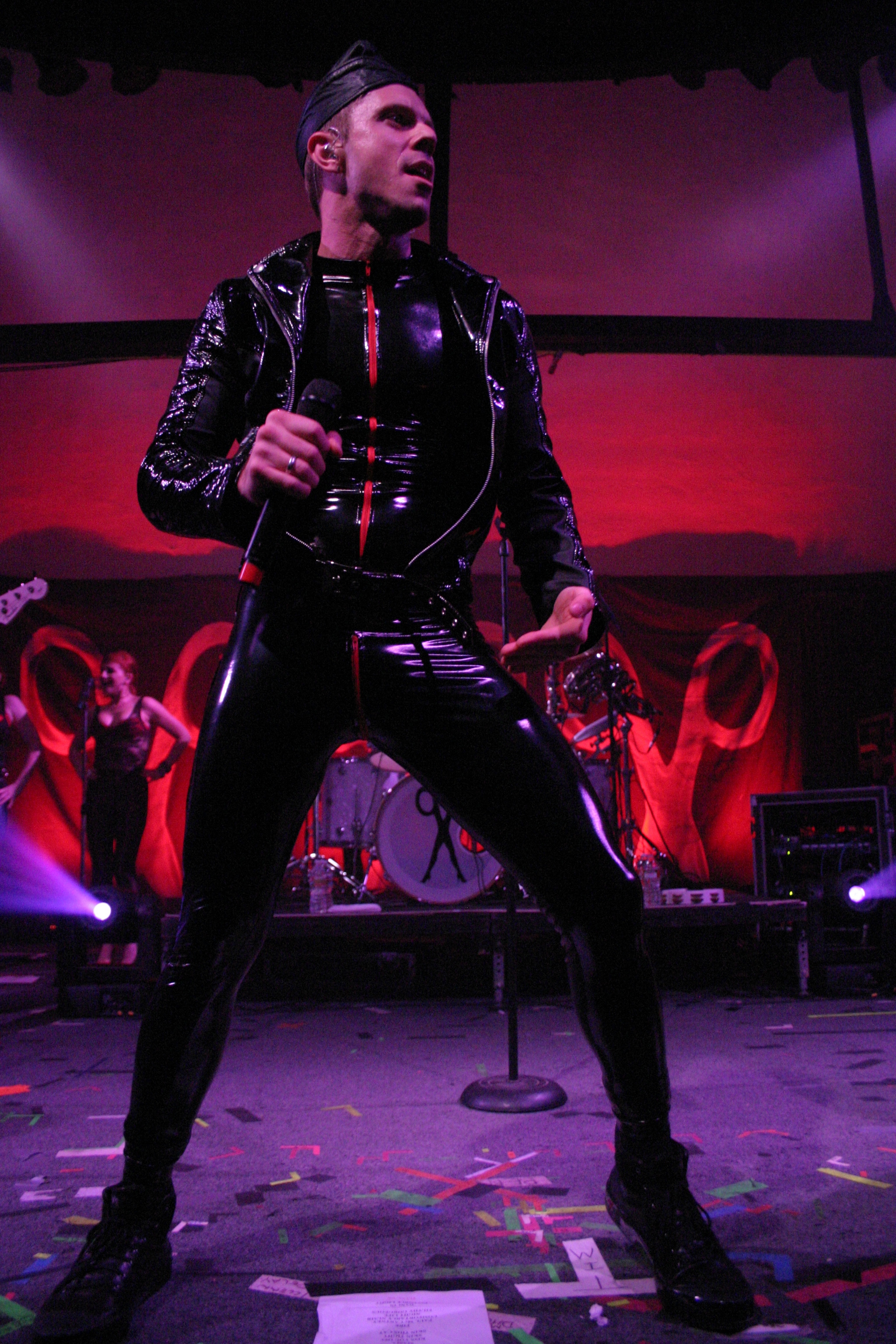
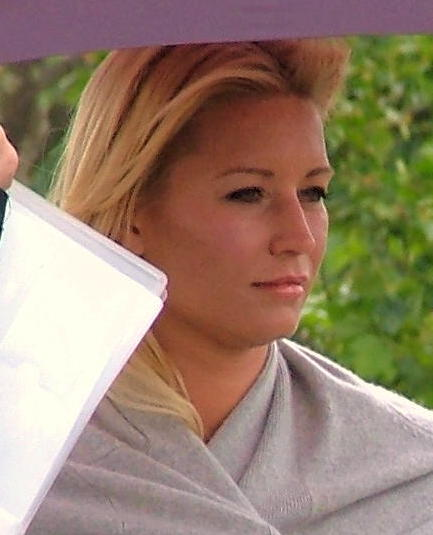
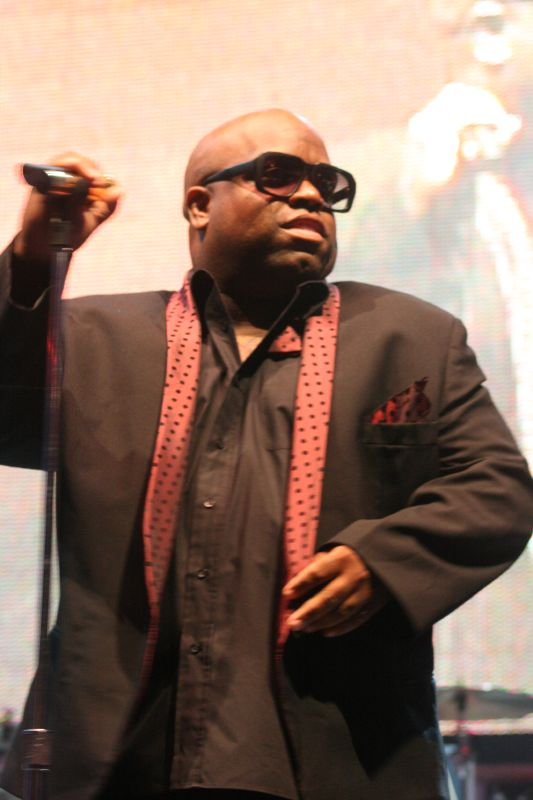
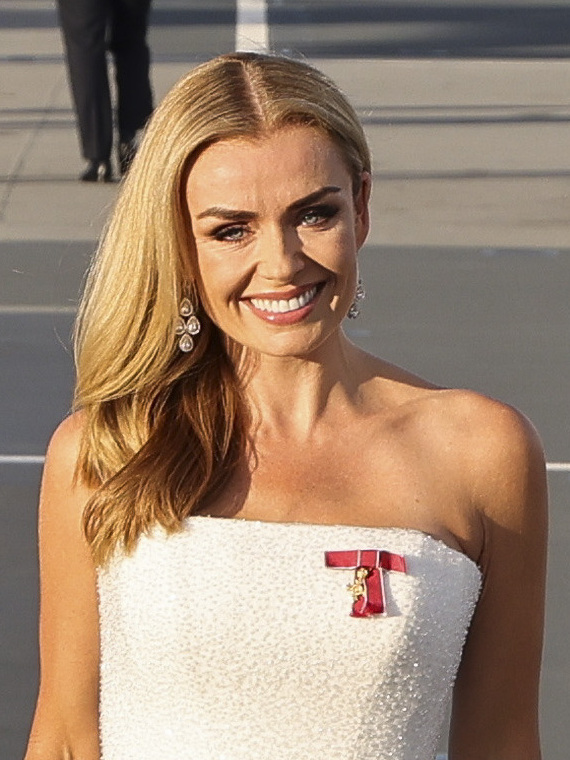
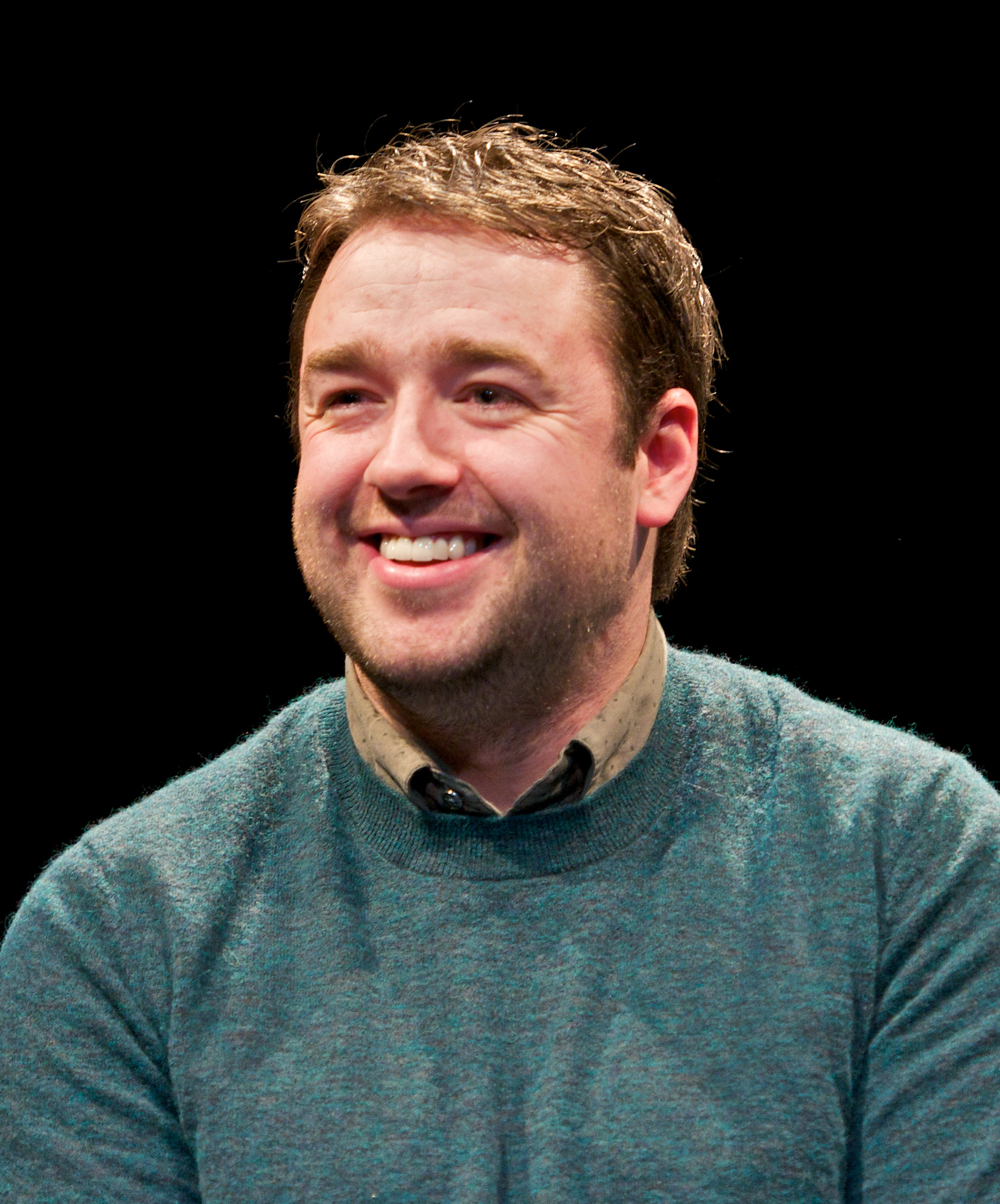
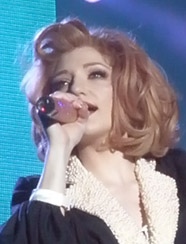
The celebrities who competed in the first series of The Masked Singer, pictured in order of elimination (L–R):
Patsy Palmer ("Butterfly"), Alan Johnson ("Pharaoh"), Justin Hawkins ("Chameleon"), Teddy Sheringham ("Tree"), Kelis ("Daisy"), Skin ("Duck"), Jake Shears ("Unicorn"), Denise van Outen ("Fox"), CeeLo Green ("Monster"), Katherine Jenkins ("Octopus"), Jason Manford ("Hedgehog"), and Nicola Roberts ("Queen Bee").

== Episodes ==
=== Episode 1 (4 January) ===
Performances on the first episode
#	Stage name	Song	Identity	Result
1	Queen Bee	"Alive" by Sia	undisclosed	WIN
2	Duck	"Like a Virgin" by Madonna	undisclosed	RISK
3	Unicorn	"Babooshka" by Kate Bush	undisclosed	WIN
4	Butterfly	"You've Got the Love" by Florence and the Machine	Patsy Palmer	OUT
5	Chameleon	"Creep" by Radiohead	undisclosed	RISK
6	Hedgehog	"Black Magic" by Little Mix	undisclosed	WIN

=== Episode 2 (5 January) ===
Performances on the second episode
#	Stage name	Song	Identity	Result
1	Monster	"Happy" by Pharrell Williams	undisclosed	RISK
2	Fox	"Call Me" by Blondie	undisclosed	WIN
3	Tree	"It Must Be Love" by Madness	undisclosed	WIN
4	Pharaoh	"Walk Like an Egyptian" by The Bangles	Alan Johnson	OUT
5	Octopus	"Part of Your World" from The Little Mermaid	undisclosed	WIN
6	Daisy	"Can't Feel My Face" by The Weeknd	undisclosed	RISK

=== Episode 3 (11 January) ===
Performances on the third episode
#	Stage name	Song	Result	
1	Unicorn	"Juice" by Lizzo	SAFE	
2	Queen Bee	"Someone You Loved" by Lewis Capaldi	SAFE	
3	Duck	"Livin' on a Prayer" by Bon Jovi	RISK	
4	Hedgehog	"Shine" by Take That	SAFE	
5	Chameleon	"Feel It Still" by Portugal. The Man	RISK	
Sing-Off			Identity	Result
1	Duck	"Ave Maria" by Schubert	undisclosed	SAFE
2	Chameleon	"True Colors" by Cyndi Lauper	Justin Hawkins	OUT

=== Episode 4 (18 January) ===
Performances on the fourth episode
#	Stage name	Song	Result	
1	Octopus	"Splish Splash" by Bobby Darin	RISK	
2	Tree	"Lovely Day" by Bill Withers	RISK	
3	Daisy	"I Can't Make You Love Me" by Bonnie Raitt	SAFE	
4	Monster	"Can't Help Falling in Love" by Elvis Presley	SAFE	
5	Fox	"On the Radio" by Donna Summer	SAFE	
Sing-Off			Identity	Result
1	Octopus	"One Last Time" by Ariana Grande	undisclosed	SAFE
2	Tree	"Evergreen" by Westlife	Teddy Sheringham	OUT

=== Episode 5 (25 January) ===
- Guest panelist: Donny Osmond (in place of Ken Jeong)

Performances on the fifth episode
#	Stage name	Clue song	Identity	Result
1	Monster	"Don't Cha" by The Pussycat Dolls	undisclosed	RISK
2	Fox	"On My Own" from Les Misérables	undisclosed	SAFE
3	Daisy	"Unforgettable" by Nat King Cole	Kelis	OUT
4	Queen Bee	"Girl on Fire" by Alicia Keys	undisclosed	SAFE
5	Octopus	"Diamonds Are Forever" by Shirley Bassey	undisclosed	SAFE
6	Unicorn	"Sharp Dressed Man" by ZZ Top	undisclosed	SAFE
7	Hedgehog	"Don't Look Back in Anger" by Oasis	undisclosed	SAFE
8	Duck	"Blinded by Your Grace, Pt. 2" by Stormzy ft. MNEK	undisclosed	SAFE

=== Episode 6 (1 February) ===
- Group number: "High Hopes" by Panic! at the Disco
- Guest panelists: Sharon Osbourne and Kelly Osbourne (in place of Ken Jeong)

Performances on the sixth episode
#	Stage name	Song	Identity	Result
1	Fox	"Firework" by Katy Perry	undisclosed	RISK
2	Duck	"My Heart Will Go On" by Celine Dion	Skin	OUT
3	Unicorn	"Girls & Boys" by Blur	Jake Shears	OUT
4	Queen Bee	"Heaven" by DJ Sammy	undisclosed	SAFE
5	Monster	"Human" by Rag'n'Bone Man	undisclosed	SAFE
6	Hedgehog	"I'd Do Anything for Love (But I Won't Do That)" by Meat Loaf	undisclosed	SAFE
7	Octopus	"I'll Never Love Again" by Lady Gaga & Bradley Cooper	undisclosed	SAFE

=== Episode 7: Semi-final (8 February) ===
Group number: "Don't Get Me Wrong" by The Pretenders

First performances on the seventh episode
#	Stage name	Song	Identity	Result
1	Hedgehog	"Chandelier" by Sia	undisclosed	SAFE
2	Octopus	"Somewhere" by Barbra Streisand	undisclosed	SAFE
3	Fox	"Holding Out for a Hero" by Bonnie Tyler	Denise van Outen	OUT
4	Queen Bee	"Greatest Love of All" by Whitney Houston	undisclosed	SAFE
5	Monster	"Do You Really Want to Hurt Me" by Culture Club	undisclosed	SAFE

Second performances on the seventh episode
#	Stage name	Song	Identity	Result
1	Hedgehog	"My Way" by Frank Sinatra	undisclosed	SAFE
2	Octopus	"Vogue" by Madonna	undisclosed	SAFE
3	Queen Bee	"Work It Out" by Beyoncé	undisclosed	SAFE
4	Monster	"Careless Whisper" by George Michael	CeeLo Green	OUT

=== Episode 8: Final (15 February) ===
Group number: "The Greatest Show" from The Greatest Showman

First performances on the eighth episode
#	Stage name	Song	Identity	Result
1	Queen Bee	"Somebody Else's Guy" by Jocelyn Brown	undisclosed	SAFE
2	Hedgehog	"Cry Me a River" by Ella Fitzgerald	undisclosed	SAFE
3	Octopus	"Supercalifragilisticexpialidocious" from Mary Poppins	Katherine Jenkins	THIRD PLACE

Second performances on the eighth episode
#	Stage name	Song of the series	Identity	Result
1	Queen Bee	"Someone You Loved" by Lewis Capaldi	Nicola Roberts	WINNER
2	Hedgehog	"Black Magic" by Little Mix	Jason Manford	RUNNER-UP

== Ratings ==
Official ratings are taken from BARB, utilising the four-screen dashboard which includes viewers who watched the programme on laptops, smartphones, and tablets within 28 days of the original broadcast.

Episode	Date	Official rating (millions)	ITV weekly rank
1	4 January	7.10	4
2	5 January	5.50	15
3	11 January	6.52	11
4	18 January	6.26	14
5	25 January	6.35	14
6	1 February	5.83	15
7	8 February	6.51	8
8	15 February	7.69	2
Series average	2020	6.47	—N/a
