= Let's Talk Sex =

- Also known as: Let's Talk Sex with Dr. Pega Ren
- Genre: Talk show
- Directed by: Tim Lewis
- Starring: Dr. Pega Ren (host); Jonny Staub (co-host)
- Country of origin: Canada
- Original language: English
- No. of seasons: 1

Production
- Production locations: Vancouver, British Columbia
- Running time: 22 minutes

Original release
- Network: OUTtv
- Release: September 1, 2008

Let's Talk Sex with Dr. Pega Ren (often referred to as simply Let's Talk Sex) is a Canadian English language talk show, produced by Convergent Entertainment, which premiered on September 1, 2008 at 11 pm EST on Canadian digital cable specialty channel, OUTtv.

== Premise ==
Let's Talk Sex is a sex and relationship advice talk show for the LGBT community. Dr. Pega Ren, a sex therapist, answers questions from viewers and gives advice on sex and relationships. Co-host Jonny Staub introduces the questions and provides commentary and follow-up questions for Dr. Pega Ren.
