= This Time Next Year (British TV series) =

- Genre: Reality
- Presented by: Davina McCall
- Country of origin: United Kingdom
- Original language: English
- No. of series: 3
- No. of episodes: 18

Production
- Running time: 60 minutes (inc. adverts)
- Production company: Twofour

Original release
- Network: ITV
- Release: 2 November 2016 – 12 March 2019

Related
- This Time Next Year (Australian version)

This Time Next Year is a British reality television show that aired on ITV from 2 November 2016 to 12 March 2019. It was presented by Davina McCall.

On 20 February 2017, it was announced that the show had been recommissioned for a second and third series. However, on 19 January 2020 the show had been cancelled after 3 series.

== Premise ==
The series sees participants make a pledge to attain a personal life goal (such as losing weight or starting a new career) that they will then attempt to achieve over the next year. The participant then appears to leave the set and then return moments later with one year having passed, the transition made seamless through editing. They are then interviewed about what they have achieved and the challenges they faced during the past year.

== Transmissions ==
Series	Start date	End date	Episodes
1	2 November 2016	21 December 2016	6
2	10 April 2018	15 May 2018	6
3	5 February 2019	12 March 2019	6
