= This Time Next Year (Australian TV series) =

- Genre: Reality
- Presented by: Karl Stefanovic
- Country of origin: Australia
- Original language: English
- No. of series: 2
- No. of episodes: 9

Production
- Running time: 60 minutes (inc. adverts)

Original release
- Network: Nine Network
- Release: 31 July 2017 – 30 September 2019

Related
- This Time Next Year (UK version)

This Time Next Year is an Australian reality television show based on the British show of the same name. Hosted by Karl Stefanovic, it premiered on 31 July 2017 on the Nine Network.

In August 2017, the series was renewed for a second season with applications closing by 8 December 2017, with the season airing on 12 August 2019.

== Premise ==
The series sees participants make a pledge to attain a personal life goal (such as losing weight or starting a new career) that they will then attempt to achieve over the next year. The participant then appears to leave the set and then return moments later with one year having passed, the transition made seamless through editing. They are then interviewed about what they have achieved and the challenges they faced during the past year.

== Series overview ==
Series	Episodes	Originally released	
Series	Episodes	First released	Last released
1	8	31 July 2017	18 September 2017
2	8	12 August 2019	30 September 2019

== Viewership ==
=== Season 1 (2017) ===
No.	Title	Air date	Timeslot	Overnight ratings		Consolidated ratings		Total viewers	Ref(s)
No.	Title	Air date	Timeslot	Viewers	Rank	Viewers	Rank	Total viewers	Ref(s)
1	Episode 1	31 July 2017	Monday 8:45pm	1,282,000	1	130,000	1	1,412,000	
2	Episode 2	7 August 2017	Monday 8:45pm	872,000	7	92,000	7	964,000	
3	Episode 3	14 August 2017	Monday 8:45pm	931,000	7	95,000	5	1,026,000	
4	Episode 4	21 August 2017	Monday 8:45pm	800,000	7	65,000	7	865,000	
5	Episode 5	28 August 2017	Monday 8:45pm	764,000	8	35,000	7	799,000	
6	Episode 6	4 September 2017	Monday 8:45pm	821,000	7	25,000	7	846,000	
7	Episode 7	11 September 2017	Monday 8:45pm	816,000	7	50,000	7	866,000	
8	Episode 8	18 September 2017	Monday 8:45pm	803,000	7	23,000	7	826,000	

=== Season 2 (2019) ===
No.	Title	Air date	Timeslot	Overnight ratings		Consolidated ratings		Total viewers	Ref(s)
No.	Title	Air date	Timeslot	Viewers	Rank	Viewers	Rank	Total viewers	Ref(s)
1	Episode 1	12 August 2019	Monday 9:15pm	686,000	10	48,000	10	734,000	
2	Episode 2	19 August 2019	Monday 9:15pm	595,000	15	43,000	13	638,000	
3	Episode 3	26 August 2019	Monday 9:15pm	664,000	9	44,000	9	708,000	
4	Episode 4	2 September 2019	Monday 9:15pm	588,000	12	46,000	11	634,000	
5	Episode 5	9 September 2019	Monday 8:45pm	515,000	17	43,000	15	558,000	
6	Episode 6	16 September 2019	Monday 8:45pm	543,000	14	60,000	13	603,000	
7	Episode 7	23 September 2019	Monday 8:45pm	395,000	20	53,000	19	448,000	
8	Episode 8	30 September 2019	Monday 8:45pm	437,000	19	—N/a	—N/a	437,000	

== See also ==
- List of Australian television series
- List of programs broadcast by Nine Network
