= The Lateish Show with Mo Gilligan =

- Genre: Chat show Comedy; Sketch
- Presented by: Mo Gilligan
- Country of origin: United Kingdom
- Original language: English
- No. of series: 4
- No. of episodes: 27

Production
- Running time: 65 minutes (inc. adverts)

Original release
- Network: Channel 4
- Release: 19 July 2019 – 20 December 2023

The Lateish Show with Mo Gilligan is a British late-night chat show presented by comedian Mo Gilligan, that first aired on Channel 4 on 19 July 2019. Similar to other late night chat shows, the programme includes a house band, live audience and comedy sketches as well as interviews with celebrities and other guests. The show took inspiration from the 1990s entertainment show TFI Friday.

In June 2020, Channel 4 renewed the show for a second series in 2021. In December 2023, Channel 4 cancelled the show and stated that the Christmas special would be its last episode.

== History ==
In August 2018, Channel 4 commissioned the programme for six episodes, originally under the name Mo's Show. Gilligan said that the show had been under development for two years prior to its announcement. The show was produced by Expectation and Momo G.

Gilligan is a stand-up comedian. His first presenting experience was as co-host with rapper Big Narstie on The Big Narstie Show, which premiered in June 2018. As creator, associate producer and writer, Gilligan also had involvement in all aspects of the show's production, including conceiving of many of the sketches and ideas.

== Episodes ==
=== Series 1 (2019) ===
Episode	Date	Guests
1	19 July 2019	Steve Coogan, Asim Chaudhry, Tyson Fury and Jessie J
2	26 July 2019	Riz Ahmed, Lee Mack, Pixie Lott and Mel B
3	2 August 2019	David Schwimmer, Jada Pinkett Smith, Aisling Bea and Ricky Wilson
4	9 August 2019	Danny Dyer, Maya Jama, Joe Lycett and Kelis
5	16 August 2019	Harry Redknapp, Katherine Ryan, Scarlett Moffatt and Tom Davis
6	23 August 2019	Eamonn Holmes, Caroline Flack, Dermot O'Leary, Anderson .Paak, Ovie Soko and Rak-Su

=== Series 2 (2021) ===
Episode	Date	Guests
1	23 July 2021	Lily Allen, Jack Whitehall, Nathalie Emmanuel and Anne-Marie
2	30 July 2021	Martin Freeman, KSI, Joel Dommett and Raye
3	6 August 2021	Roisin Conaty, Big Zuu, Tyson Fury, Gabrielle and Beenie Man
4	13 August 2021	David Walliams, Becky Hill, Laura Whitmore, Peter Crouch and Ugo Monye
5	20 August 2021	Alesha Dixon, Aisling Bea, Adrian Dunbar, Munya Chawawa and Kurupt FM

=== Series 3 (2022) ===
Episode	Date	Guests
1	27 May 2022	Michael McIntyre, Ashley Walters, Sean Paul, Judi Love and Jon Hamm
2	3 June 2022	O-T Fagbenle, Nile Rodgers, Aitch, Iain Stirling and Alison Hammond
3	10 June 2022	Mel Giedroyc, Paddy McGuinness, Nick Mohammed and Lethal Bizzle
4	17 June 2022	Luke Evans, Kerry Godliman, DJ Spoony and Kiell Smith-Bynoe
5	24 June 2022	Jimmy Carr, Rylan, Shaggy, Claudia Winkleman and Rochelle Humes
6	1 July 2022	Harry Redknapp, Oti Mabuse, Katherine Ryan, Tom Grennan and Joe Lycett
7	8 July 2022	Blue, AJ Odudu, Jonathan Ross, Damson Idris and Guz Khan
8	27 December 2022	Jason Manford, Danny and Dani Dyer, Marvin Humes, Sophie Willan and Samson Kayo

=== Series 4 (2023) ===
Episode	Date	Guests
1	5 May 2023	Alex Scott, Harry Hill, Chris Ramsey and Daisy May Cooper
2	12 May 2023	Jessie Ware, Rio Ferdinand, Jack Whitehall and N-Dubz
3	19 May 2023	Rose Ayling-Ellis, Joel Corry, Tom Davis, Vernon Kay, and Will Poulter
4	26 May 2023	Asim Chaudhry, AJ Odudu, Adrian Lester, Sam Ryder and Davido
5	2 June 2023	Mo Farah, Gbemisola Ikumelo, Ronan Keating, Guz Khan and DJ Pied Piper
6	9 June 2023	Adam Lambert, Motsi Mabuse, Yvonne Orji, Romesh Ranganathan and So Solid Crew
7	16 June 2023	Russell Howard, Craig David, Leigh-Anne Pinnock, Dermot O'Leary and Zara Larsson
8	20 December 2023	Joel Dommett, Leona Lewis, Fred Sirieix, Allan Mustafa and Babatunde Aléshé

== Reception ==
The Guardian reviewers Ellen E Jones and Jack Seale both praised Gilligan's confidence in hosting. Seale described the format as "mixing eclectic lineups with musical and comic set pieces in a way that is fresh without being revolutionary". However, Jones found the sketches "hit and miss".

In 2020, the show had won a BAFTA in the "Entertainment Performance" category.
