= Argonon =

Television and digital media company

Argonon Ltd
- Type: Limited company
- Industry: Television; Digital media
- Founded: 7 February 2011; 15 years ago in London, England
- Founder: James Burstall; Joey Attawia
- Headquarters: London, United Kingdom
- Area served: London; Los Angeles; New York; Glasgow; Oklahoma
- Key people: David Dugan (Director)
- Revenue: £55.6 million (2021)
- Divisions: Argonon USA
- Subsidiaries: Bandicoot TV; BriteSpark Films; Leopard Pictures; Like A Shot Entertainment; Rose Rock Entertainment; Windfall Films
- Website: argonon.com

Argonon Ltd is an independent media production & distribution group founded in 2011 by James Burstall, the CEO of Leopard Films. Argonon has offices in London, Los Angeles, New York, Oklahoma, and Glasgow. The group produces and distributes factual entertainment, documentary, reality, arts, drama, and children's programming for various television networks and channels worldwide, although they focus on the UK, US, and Canadian markets. Argonon produces shows such as The Masked Singer UK (ITV), Worzel Gummidge (BBC One), Hard Cell (Netflix), Dispatches (Channel 4), Attenborough and the Mammoth Graveyard (BBC One) and House Hunters International (HGTV).

== History ==
Argonon Group was established in May 2011 when Leopard Films alongside its drama production arm Leopard Drama, New York-based American production division Leopard USA and the company's international distribution arm Leopard International had joined forces with London-based multi-media entertainment production company Remedy Productions into forming a new independent production group as Leopard Films became the factual production label of the new group and Remedy Productions became the group's entertainment label whilst the former's international arm Leopard Distribution was renamed to Argonon Distribution to reflect the establishment of Argonon & would be the main distribution for programmes produced by Argonon's companies as Leopard Films' founder and president James Burstall became the president of the newly formed production group Argonon.

One day later, Argonon's entertainment label Remedy Productions entered the Canadian production operations with the launch of Remedy Productions' new Canadian production division based in Vancouver alongside a Canadian production office in that country and would partner with UK independent production companies that want to operate in that country called Remedy Canada. Remedy's new parent Argonon had appointed former Wall to Wall financial director Stuart Mullin as its CFO of the production group whilst Leopard Films' MD Susie Field became Argonon's managing director. One year later in 2012 following the establishment of Argonon, Remedy Canada the Vancouver Canadian production division of Argonon's entertainment label Remedy Productions was officially launched when Argonon had appointed co-founder of Argonon's entertainment label Remedy Productions & veteran producer Toby Dormer to head Remedy Productions' Canadian production division Remedy Canada as its president with Remedy Canada .

In February 2014, Argonon Group expanded its operations with the acquisition of BAFTA and Emmy award-winning independent factual & documentary production company Windfall Films with its co-founder and CEO David Dugan joining Argonon Group's board of directors.

In March 2017, Argon established two new production companies: the factual entertainment production company Barefaced TV that would produce and create factual entertainment and feature formats for both the UK and international markets as the new company with two former Tellycopter's head of entertainment Rosie Bray and Lucy Golding as co-presidents, and Argonon had partnered with former Lime Pictures non-scripted and vice president Derek McLean and former NBCUniversal head of development and entertainment Daniel Nettleton into forming a multi-genre joint venture production company Bandicoot with the two executived heading the new production company as co-presidents.

In the same year Leopard Pictures invested in Kristian Smith, twice BAFTA winner, as Chief Creative Officer.

In January 2018, Argonon Group had brought London-based production company Like A Shot Entertainment becoming Argonon Group's eleventh production company as Argonon had expanded its American production team in order to grow its international business and had appointed Shirley Escott as its American CCO to head up Argonon's American production units which were Leopard USA and Tough Cookie as Shirley Escott would oversee Argonon's American production companies.

Argonon won the National Winner Award (UK) at the European Awards in 2018 and 2019. Argonon has won over 190 awards including Emmys, BAFTAs, and RTS Awards, and received over 280 nominations.

In August 2020, Argonon had expanded its US production operations by launching its American production division named Argonon USA and launched an American production office based in Los Angeles as its first West Coast operation with Argonon's Manhattan-based American production company Leopard USA became a subsidiary of the production group's newly established American production arm as the newly launched American division had appointed former Story Street and Collins Avenue executive Lindsay Schwartz to head Argonon's American production division Argonon USA and its subsidiary Leopard USA as its CCO, Argonon's president and CEO James Bursall would head the new division as president alongside Leopard USA CFO Shirley Escott who had also joined Argonon's American division, Argonon had also promoted corporate controller Matt Widmayer to become Leopard USA New York bureau chief and Livvy Clackett became executive in charge of production of the subsidiary while Jillian Brand remained as senior VP of development of Argonon USA's unit Leopard USA.

In 2020, Argonon acquired a branded video agency, Nemorin Film & Video, bringing Nemorin's CEO Pete Fergusson into the group.

In February 2021, Argonon had launched its factual formats-focused production subsidiary dedicated to factual content for broadcasters both as standalone projects and collaborations called Studio Leo becoming its eight production subsidiary umbrella as the new production subsidiary Studio Leo will be based in London with former Hat Trick Productions factual executive Claire Collinson-Jones becoming Chief Creative Officer of Argonon's new factual formats-focused production subsidiary Studio Leo as the new production subsidiary produced its first commission called 101 Years at Tesco.

In 2022, Argonon partnered with Joe Weinstock to launch a new production company, Rose Rock Entertainment.

The group saw a turnover of £55.6m in 2021. Argonon was listed in the London Stock Exchange "1000 Companies To Inspire Britain 2016" and 2017 reports. Argonon was also listed in the 2016 Sunday Times HSBC Track 200.

== Companies (current) ==
=== Bandicoot TV ===
Bandicoot TV (sometimes credited as Bandicoot Scotland) was founded in 2017 by Derek McLean and Daniel Nettleton as a joint venture with Argonon. Productions include Chase The Case for BBC One, Test Drive for BBC Scotland and ITV's versions of The Masked Singer and spin-off The Masked Dancer.

The Masked Singer is a singing competition based on the Masked Singer franchise and is an ongoing production for Bandicoot. It is directed by Casey Antwis and Simon Staffurth, with Jonathan Ross, Davina McCall, Ken Jeong, and Rita Ora as panellists. In series two, Jeong was replaced by Mo Gilligan and in series six Ora was replaced by Maya Jama. The spin-off series, The Masked Dancer, featured Jonathan Ross, Davina McCall, Mo Gilligan and Oti Mabuse as panellists. Joel Dommett has hosted all series of The Masked Singer and The Masked Dancer.

The Masked Singer won a Royal Television Society Programme Award 2021 in the Entertainment category and an International Emmy Award 2021 in the Non-Scripted Entertainment category.

The Masked Singer Live! tour version of the show was announced by Joel Dommett in an appearance on The One Show in December 2021. The Masked Singer Live! toured the UK throughout 2022. The third series of The Masked Singer premiered on ITV on 1 January 2022.

In February 2022, it was announced that The Masked Singer had been recommissioned by ITV for two further seasons, with fourth series of The Masked Singer premiering on 1 January 2023.

Bandicoot was also behind Peckham's Finest for ITV2. This was an observational documentary series following a diverse group of young people from the area of Peckham, London.

=== BriteSpark Films ===
BriteSpark Films (also credited as BrightSpark East) launched as a co-venture between documentary film-maker Nick Godwin and the Argonon group in 2013. In 2018, Argonon acquired full ownership of the company, with Godwin staying on as Creative Director. The company produces factual, features, documentary and drama-documentary programming for the international market and has worked with ITV, Channel 5, Channel 4, Shaw Media, Discovery International, and Discovery ID.

Productions include long-running Channel 5 series Nightmare Tenants, Slum Landlords which focuses on conflicts between landlords and tenants; a portrait of London's jewellers working in the Hatton Garden district called Diamond Geezers and Gold Dealers (for ITV); a programme for Channel 4 called Manchester's Serial Killer? which investigates a spate of suspicious deaths in Manchester's canals; a drama-documentary series for Investigation Discovery called The Wives Did It which profiles murder cases involving polygamy. BriteSpark also produces Incredible Engineering Blunders: Fixed for Discovery International and a madcap, gross-out, comedy game show called What The Yuck?! with Geordie Shore star Nathan Henry.

BriteSpark also produced the Bill Nighy narrated Channel 5 travel documentaries World's Most Scenic Railway Journeys and World's Most Scenic River Journeys, with the latter series co-produced with the Blue Ant-owned Saloon Media in Canada.

BriteSpark also produced several episodes for Channel 4's current affairs strand Dispatches, including Royals for Hire, Deep Fakes: Can You Trust Your Eyes?, Coronavirus: How Britain is Changing, The Prince and the Paedophile and The Truth About Electric Cars.

=== Leopard Pictures ===
Leopard Pictures was launched in 2017 from the previously titled Leopard Drama. Kristian Smith was appointed Chief Creative Officer.

Their most recent shows were Worzel Gummidge, a two-part children's drama series which aired on BBC1 starring Mackenzie Crook, the animated Mimi And The Mountain Dragon, and The Snow Spider (CBBC & BBC One Wales).

Crook features in the titular role in Worzel Gummidge, while also writing and directing the series. The miniseries is an adaptation of Barbara Euphan Todd's series of books in which the character Worzel Gummidge, a magical scarecrow, appears. Two one-hour specials aired in December 2019, titled The Scarecrow of Scatterbrook and The Green Man. The third one-hour special, titled Saucy Nancy, aired in December 2020. Saucy Nancy won an RTS Craft & Design Award in 2021 in the Sound – Drama category.

In November 2021, a Bonfire Night special of Worzel Gummidge titled Guy Forks, aired. Two further one-hour Worzel Gummidge specials aired on BBC One in December 2021, titled Twitchers and Calliope Jane.

Leopard Pictures' latest production, Hard Cell, starring Catherine Tate was released on Netflix in April 2022.

=== Leopard USA ===
Leopard USA creates reality, lifestyle, and entertainment programming. From its office in New York City, Leopard USA produces hundreds of hours of programming yearly for television and digital distribution for channels including Facebook, HGTV, DIY, GSN, A&E, TruTV, Speedvision, Discovery, TLC, BBC America, and CNBC. Leopard USA was founded in 2002 and became part of the Argonon group in 2011.

The first programme produced by Leopard USA was Cash in the Attic USA for HGTV.

Leopard USA programming includes HGTV's House Hunters International, with over 2000 episodes and 160 series completed to date. The programme brand has extended to further shows including House Hunters Off the Grid and House Hunters International: The Adventure Continues. House Hunters International won a Critics Choice Real TV Award 2021 for Best Lifestyle: Home/Garden Show.

Man Caves is a long-running home renovation reality show which was first produced by Leopard USA in 2007 and is presented by former Super Bowl winner Tony Siragusa for cable channel DIY. Dear Genevieve, featuring designer and presenter Genevieve Gorder, launched on HGTV in 2009, and each episode sees Gorder design a room or an area for a family after they have written to the show asking for help.

Other programming highlights include Food Network's Restaurant Divided and CNBC's The Filthy Rich Guide. Programmes for A&E include Missing Las Vegas, Disaster Guy, and Ransom Squad.

In 2019, a multi-part series called Mormon Love was aired on Facebook Watch. It was produced by James Burstall, Rick de Oliveira, and Jillian Brand.

In 2021, six episodes of the US revival of Cash in the Attic, hosted by Courtney Tezeno, aired on HGTV and was later available to stream on Discovery+. The series is executive produced by Leopard USA's Chief Creative Officer, Lindsay Schwartz, and Argonon CEO James Burstall.

=== Like a Shot Entertainment ===
Like A Shot Entertainment is the London-based factual entertainment production subsidiary of Argonon that specializes in producing high-quality factual entertainment, science & factual history programming for television and podcasts.

It was first established in August 2011 by Henry Scott and Steve Gillham.

The company handles production of shows such as UKTV-Yesterday's/Science Channel's Abandoned Engineering, Forbidden History and Smoke & Steel.

Like A Shot's latest production, Black Panthers of WWII aired on UKTV-Yesterday channel in October 2021 as part of Black History Month. The one-off documentary special tells the story of a tank battalion composed of African-American service members, the first US armoured unit of its kind to enter combat.

In September 2022, Like A Shot launched a 10 episode podcast series, Forbidden History.

==== Productions ====
Title	Years	Network	Notes
Twisted Twins	2024	ITV1	under Like A Shot West

=== Rose Rock Entertainment ===
Rose Rock Entertainment launched in 2022 as a joint venture between Joe Weinstock and the Argonon Group. Rose Rock Entertainment launched with offices in Los Angeles and Oklahoma and will focus on delivering cinematic American factual content.

=== Windfall Films ===
Windfall Films is a BAFTA and Emmy award-winning independent production company. Founded in 1988 by David Dugan, Ian Duncan, and Oliver Morse, it became part of the Argonon group in 2014.

The company produces factual and documentary programmes across various genres, including science, engineering, social, history, adventure, and natural history. The company produces programmes for international television networks including BBC, Channel 4, Channel 5, PBS, Discovery Channel, National Geographic Channel, and History Channel.

Highlights include Murder Trial for Channel 4 which won many documentary awards in 2014, including a BAFTA award for best Single Documentary, a Grierson award for Best Documentary on a Contemporary Theme, an RTS award for Best Single Documentary and a Broadcast Award for Best Single Documentary.

Your Inner Fish for PBS (produced in collaboration with Tangled Bank Studios) won two Wildscreen Panda Awards, two Jackson Hole Science Media awards, and an AAAS Kavli award.

The Batman of Mexico for BBC Natural World won a Wildscreen Panda Award and a New York Wild Film Festival award.

In 2009, Sons of Cuba, a feature documentary about an inspirational boxing academy in Havana and winner of Best Documentary at the Rome Film Festival and Best Newcomer Grierson Award.

Science and Natural History highlights include Inside Nature's Giants for Channel 4, which won a BAFTA for Best Specialist Factual; The Fifteen Billion Pound Railway about the Crossrail project in London for BBC 2; Strip the Cosmos for Discovery's Science Channel; Born in the Wild and Operation Maneater for Channel 4; Spider House for BBC Four; The Raising of the Costa Concordia for NGCI and PBS NOVA; Race & Intelligence: Science's Last Taboo, an investigation by Rageh Omaar which launched a Channel 4 season on race.

Additional notable science highlights include Inside Einstein's Mind for BBC Four, Einstein's Quantum Riddle for PBS, Saving Planet Earth: Fixing a Hole for Channel 4, which won Best Science Film at Green Screen 2019, and How to See a Black Hole: The Universe's Greatest Mystery for BBC Four, which captured the first-ever image of a black hole and won a Gold Award at the 2020 New York Festivals TV and Film Awards in the Science & Technology category.

Windfall also produced the Emmy award-winning series DNA for PBS and Channel 4 celebrating the 50th anniversary of the double helix for Channel 4 and PBS; Absolute Zero was a series about the science of extreme cold for PBS and BBC 4; Wanted: Butch Cassidy and The Sundance Kid was produced for C4 True Stories and PBS NOVA and Reality On The Rocks was a Channel 4 series that follows Ken Campbell trying to get to grips with A Brief History of Time.

Windfall Films has produced live multi-platform events for Channel Four, including D Day: As It Happens, winner of a Digital Emmy, a BAFTA craft innovation award and two Webby Awards; Easter Eggs Live; Foxes Live: Wild in the City; The Operation: Surgery Live, a week of live surgery.

Windfall has produced several historical documentaries, including Generals At War, a 'cardboard' battle strategy format for NGCI; Attack of the Zeppelins; and Dambusters: Building the Bouncing Bomb (for C4 and PBS NOVA); The Great Escape: Revealed for Channel 5 and PBS; Colditz; Men of Iron and Commando, all for Channel 4.

Windfall has also produced engineering formats illustrated with CGI, including Strip the City for Discovery's Science Channel; Rise of the Machines for H2 and Discovery Canada; Big, Bigger, Biggest for Channel 5 and National Geographic Channel and five series of Monster Moves for Channel 5 and Discovery Channel. Other programmes include two factually-based dramas for Channel Four: Born with Two Mothers and Richard is My Boyfriend and award-winning observational documentaries for Channel 4, including The Decision and Fifteen for BBC.

Windfall has also produced adventure formats including The Tourist Trap spied on four different nationalities on holiday and Lost!, dropping three blindfolded groups of competitors anywhere in the world and then following their progress as they race home, and Mutiny for Channel 4, an experimental programme challenging modern men to relive the Mutiny on the Bounty of 1789.

Large returning formats produced by Windfall include: Strip the Cosmos for Discovery Science, Railroad Alaska for Discovery Channel, Unearthed for Discovery Channel, Lost Treasures of Egypt for Nat Geo, My Floating Home for More4, Europe From Above for Nat Geo, and the Royal Institution Christmas Lectures for BBC.

In 2021, Windfall produced the documentary, Jabbed! Inside Britain's Vaccine Triumph for Channel 4, telling the story of the government's Vaccine Taskforce – the team responsible for finding, funding and procuring Covid vaccines, specifically the Oxford-AstraZeneca vaccine. The documentary won a BAFTA Scotland award in the News & Current Affairs category.

Other notable productions include Attenborough, and the Mammoth Graveyard for BBC One, presented by Sir David Attenborough.

In January 2022, Windfall Films released their first feature-length film, The Wall - Climb for Gold. The film followed the lives of four elite female climbers, Brooke Raboutou, Janja Garnbret, Miho Nonaka, and Shauna Coxsey, and their journey to Tokyo 2020 Olympics.

Windfall Films has been featured in Broadcast Magazine's top ten polls of independent production companies.

== Companies (previous) ==
=== Leopard Drama (now Leopard Pictures) ===
Leopard Drama produced contemporary British drama and comedy for various broadcasters, including BBC, ITV, and CBBC, and co-produced theatrical cinema releases. Leopard Pictures was founded in 2005 and became part of the Argonon group in 2011.

The most recent series was Eve, a 13-part children's drama series which aired on CBBC in the UK, running for three series.

Previous TV drama includes An Englishman in New York starring John Hurt and Cynthia Nixon which aired on ITV and in several countries throughout the world. The film received several accolades including a 2009 Teddy Award at the Berlinale for Outstanding Performance by an Actor for John Hurt. Also in 2009, the film was Winner, Best Feature, at the Hamburg Lesbian and Gay Film Festival. The film was nominated for a Best Actor BAFTA for John Hurt in 2010 and nominated in two categories at the BAFTA TV Craft Awards in 2010 with Joey Attawia nominated for Best Costume Design and Beth Mickle for Best Production Design. The filmed received a Royal Television Society Craft and Design Awards nomination for Joey Attawia in 2010, and was a nominee at the Rose D'Or Global Television Festival for Best Drama & Mini Series as well as a nominee at the Glaad Media Awards in 2010 in the category of Outstanding TV Movie or Mini Series.

Mysterious Creatures for ITV1 starring Brenda Blethyn and Timothy Spall was nominated for a Royal Television Society award for Sharon Martin in the category of Best Hair, and Makeup and was the winner of the Best Single & Serial Drama at the Mental Health Media Awards (sponsored by BAFTA) in 2007. Missing was a crime drama starring Pauline Quirke for BBC One, which ran for two series and was shortlisted for Best Drama Series at the Mental Health Awards in 2009.

The production company also produced a one-off comedy-drama, The Grey Man, based on a novel by Andy McNab, for BBC One and a 5-part series of comedy shorts, Conversations with my Wife for BBC Comedy starring Lenny Henry.

Leopard Pictures' first co-produced feature was The Holding, released in 2012, starring Vincent Regan. The film won an award at Fantasporto, the International Fantasy Film Awards in 2012 for Susan Jacobson in the category of Best Director and was nominated at the Chicago International Film Festival in 2011 in the After Dark Competition.

=== Leopard Films ===
Founded in 2001, Leopard Films was one of the first companies to join Argonon in 2011 and supplies programmes across the factual, factual entertainment, children's, and art genres for broadcasters across the UK including BBC, Channel 4, Channel 5 UK, and BSkyB.

The first show produced by the production company was Monstrous Bosses and How to Be One for BBC1. The second was Cash in the Attic for the BBC, which ran for ten years on the BBC and went on to transmit in 167 countries following its launch in 2002. The series was nominated for a Royal Television Society Programme Awards, 2008, for Best Daytime Programme in 2002. An offshoot series Celebrity Cash in the Attic was produced by Leopard Films and a website www.cashintheattic.com launched in 2013 in the UK and 2015 in the US, as a digital brand extension of the show.

Other programmes include The War on Britain's Roads for BBC One in 2014 which explored the tensions between cyclists and motorists on Britain's roads and was nominated for a Grierson Award for Best Documentary on a Contemporary Theme Leopard Films produced Tourette's: Let Me Entertain You for BBC Three where musicians with Tourette's Syndrome were given the chance to perform in front of a live audience.

Other commissions for Leopard included Street Patrol UK for BBC One, Britcam: Emergency on our Streets (Pick and Sky1), Snowtrapped for Channel 5 and Robbed, Raided, Reunited for BBC Two. Missing Live (BBC One) was nominated for a Royal Television Society award for Best Daytime programme in 2008 and won a CorpComms Award for Best Use of Broadcast as Part of a Communication Strategy. Other programmes included My Daughter, Deafness and Me for BBC One, Is Oral Sex Safe for BBC Three, Dispatches: Cash vs Cards for Channel 4.

A major debate around immigration in the UK followed the documentary The Day the Immigrants Left presented by Evan Davis. The programme was nominated at the Rose D'Or Festival for Best Mini-series in 2010.

In 2015, Leopard Films produced the six-part series Britain's Got the Builders in for BBC Two.

The company produces a slate of art documentaries and live art performance programming including Matthew Bourne's Sleeping Beauty for BBC Two; Imagine: A Beauty is Born for BBC One, Matthew Bourne's Christmas for Channel 4; The World of Matthew Bourne which won the Czech Crystal in 2012 for Recordings of Opera, Swan Lake (Bourne) in 3D, Operetta, Musicians, Dance, ballet, Concerts Category and a Prix Italia in 2013 in the Performing Arts Category; Bussell on Ballerinas for BBC One; Death in Venice for Sky Arts 2; Bach: A Passionate Life for BBC Two which won the Czech Crystal in 2013 for Documentary Programmes dedicated to Music and Dance Leonardo Live for Sky1 and cinematic release and Big Dance for Channel 4.

The company also produced two series of children's format Trade Your Way to the USA for CBBC.

=== Transparent TV ===
Transparent Television produces prime-time factual entertainment and documentary programming, which is run by co-founder and managing director Jazz Gowans. The company joined the Argonon group in 2012. The production company works with several major UK broadcasters, including BBC, ITV, Channel 4, Channel 5, Yesterday TV Channel, Food Network, and Liv (TV channel) to produce factual programming, documentaries, and formats, and often features with a theme of real-life stories and populist themes.

Commissioned shows include six series of access-all-areas cosmetic surgery series Botched up Bodies at Channel 5 and spin-off shows Botched Up Brides and Botched Up Abroad. A youth-skewed version has also aired on MTV. Jonathan Phang's Gourmet Trains was transmitted on Food Network in 2013, and the second series was launched in 2015. The Incredible Hulk Woman was also transmitted as part of the Extraordinary People season on Channel 5 in 2014. The Great Northern Cookbook series aired on Channel 5 in 2013 and was accompanied by a cookbook detailing the recipes featured in the show.

Transparent TV has also produced several documentaries focused on issues, including The Baby With the New Face for Channel 5, Leslie Ash: Face to Face for ITV1, 7 New Faces in 7 Days for Channel 5, and Queer as Old Folk for Channel 4.

Other productions include Restoration Roadshow and Italia Contia: Living the Dream for BBC Two, Danger: Diggers at Work for Channel 5, Mitch Winehouse's Showbiz Rant for UK Living spin-off channel LIV and I was a Jet Stewardess for Yesterday.

=== Remedy Productions ===
Founded in 2003 by Toby Dormer and Juliet Borges, Remedy Productions was one of the first production companies to join Argonon in 2011. The company was the No 1. independent producer of entertainment programming in the UK in 2014, delivering over 1000 hours of content to the major terrestrial, digital and online channels every year. Denis O'Connor is Chief Creative Officer, and Bernie Costello is the managing director.

Remedy produces content across the entertainment, music, and live event genres as well as branded and digital content, and has supplied content to Channel 4, BBC, MTV, and BSkyB. Remedy's most recent productions include Fifteen to One and Celebrity Fifteen to One for Channel 4. Other programmes include BBC Radio 1's Teen Awards for CBBC, BBC Three, and iPlayer and over 1000 hours of music programming for MTV, including The Official Top 40 and MTV News.

The production company's first series commission was Cabin Truckers, produced for Blue Ant Media and airing on Cottage Life (TV channel) in Canada, the programme "follows a family run business that moves houses and massive structures," against the backdrop of Western Canada. In 2015, Remedy Canada was commissioned by Shaw Media's Slice (TV channel) to produce First Dates Canada.
