= James Burstall =

British film and television producer

- Born: James Christopher St Etienne Burstall; 20 May 1965 (age 61)
- Occupation: Founder of Argonon
- Years active: 2001–present
- Parent: Christopher Burstall
- Website: jamesburstall.com argonon.com

James Burstall is a British film and television producer and Executive Chairman of the international group Argonon which he founded in 2011. Argonon has many companies within the group located in London, Los Angeles, New York City, Oklahoma and Glasgow.

Burstall’s broadcast career credits span many genres and international territories. They range from reality series Mormon Love on Facebook Watch, TV shows Cash in the Attic and House Hunters International to feature-length drama An Englishman In New York. Argonon, through some acquisitions and joint ventures, produces entertainment shows such as The Masked Singer (ITV), dramas such as Worzel Gummidge (BBC One), Hard Cell (Netflix) and documentaries such as Dispatches (Channel 4) and Mysteries of the Abandoned (Discovery Science).

== Education ==
Burstall studied modern languages at the University of Bristol, studied leadership at the Said Business School, University of Oxford (2011) and Leading Changing at the Graduate School of Business, University of Stanford, California (2013).

== Career ==
Before his television career, Burstall was a journalist, working as a writer and editor in Paris, London and New York for Vanity Fair, Condé Nast Traveler, and The Evening Standard.

Burstall was CEO of Leopard Films which he founded in 2001. Before Leopard Films, Burstall worked as an executive producer and producer-director for broadcasters worldwide. Notable projects include Secret History of Hacking (Channel 4/TLC), Cutting Edge (Channel 4) and ITV’s weekly investigative series The Big Story. He also was a founding producer for London’s Planet 24 (The Big Breakfast for Channel 4) and was an on-screen reporter and producer for the BBC.

He then created Leopard USA, a New-York based production company, in 2003, then Leopard Drama and Leopard International, a distribution and rights business, in 2004.

Burstall was a finalist in the 2009 IoD London and the South East Director of the Year Awards for 'Institute of Directors of the Year' (over £5,000,000 category).

Burstall created Argonon in 2011, bringing Leopard Films, Leopard Drama and Leopard USA together, renaming Leopard International as Argonon International and acquiring Remedy Productions, specialists in entertainment, music and live events.

In 2012, Burstall confirmed the launch of Remedy Canada, with significant investment from Argonon, followed by the acquisition of Transparent TV, producers of lifestyle and documentary programming in the UK, in 2013. Subsequently, that same year, he launched Argonon’s first joint venture BriteSpark Films in 2013, bringing documentarian Nick Godwin into the group. He made further acquisitions, including the multi-award-winning Windfall Films. He took his original production, Cash in the Attic, into the digital world in 2013 with the launch of CashInTheAttic.com, a joint venture providing an online portal for fans of antiques, collectables and vintage.

In 2014, Burstall launched further joint ventures, Blacklisted Films, a new drama startup, and The Bridge, a conduit bridging English-speaking TV producers with their counterparts in Asia. The Bridge is co-producing projects in Korea.

Burstall's Argonon group, which includes eight companies, saw a turnover of more than £55m in 2020. Argonon is listed in the London Stock Exchange "1000 Companies To Inspire Britain 2016" report as well as the 2017 report. Argonon is listed in the 2016 Sunday Times HSBC Track 200. In 2019, Argonon won the National Winner Award (UK) at the European Awards.

In 2017, Argonon acquired non-scripted producer Like A Shot Entertainment. Burstall's group also invested in a joint venture: Bandicoot, in partnership with Derek McLean and Daniel Nettleton.

In late 2020, Argonon acquired branded video agency, Nemorin Film & Video. In 2021, Argonon launched a factual formats-focused production company, Studio Leo, with Claire Collinson-Jones becoming the Chief Creative Officer of the firm.

== Argonon Group companies and productions ==
Argonon is made up of eight companies: Bandicoot Scotland (a joint venture with Bandicoot co-founders Derek McLean and Daniel Nettleton); Leopard Pictures (Worzel Gummidge, BBC One); BriteSpark East/BriteSpark Films (known for Channel 4's Dispatches); Leopard USA (House Hunters International, HGTV); Windfall Films (Unearthed, Discovery); Like A Shot (Abandoned Engineering, UKTV's Yesterday); Studio Leo (Inside Tesco 24/7, Channel 5) and Nemorin Film & Video.

Argonon has won over 190 awards and received over 200 nominations. These include Emmys, BAFTAs and RTS Awards.

Notable productions from the various companies under the Argonon Group include Bandicoot Scotland's The Masked Singer, a singing competition featuring Jonathan Ross, Davina McCall, Mo Gilligan and Rita Ora as panellists. The Masked Singer won a Royal Television Society Programme Award 2021 in the Entertainment category and was nominated for an International Emmy Award 2021 in the Non-Scripted Entertainment category. Other notable productions include Netflix's Hard Cell starring Catherine Tate and Channel 5's World’s Most Scenic River Journeys, a documentary narrated by Bill Nighy, which has been co-produced with Blue Ant Media in Canada.

== Productions ==
- The Secret History of Hacking (Executive Producer)
- French Express (Producer Director – Diverse Productions)
- The Big Story with Dermot Murnaghan (Producer Director – Twenty Twenty)
- The Big Breakfast (Producer – Planet 24)
- Reportage (On-screen Reporter and Producer – BBC DEF II)
- Rough Guides to the World (Producer – BBC DEF II)

Executive Producer – Leopard Films

- Monstrous Bosses and How To Be One – BBC One
- Cash in the Attic – BBC One. Ran for ten years on the BBC and was transmitted in a further 167 countries after launching in 2002. Nominated for Best Daytime Programme at the Royal Television Society Awards 2003.
- The Day the Immigrants Left – BBC One. Nominated for Rose D'or.
- Missing Live – BBC One. Nominated for a Royal Television Society Award for Best Daytime programme in 2008 and commended in the House of Commons as a programme that changes people's lives.

Executive Producer - Leopard USA

- Mormon Love – Facebook Watch
- House Hunters International – HGTV
- Man Caves – DIY
- Dear Genevieve – HGTV
- Hidden Potential – HGTV
- Missing Las Vegas – A&E
- Disaster Guy – A&E
- São Paulo: Hostage Capital of the World – A&E
- Cash in the Attic (USA) – HGTV/Discovery

Executive Producer - Leopard Drama

- Mysterious Creatures – ITV1. Winner of the Best Single & Serial Drama at the Mental Health Awards/BAFTA 2007.
- The Grey Man – BBC One
- Missing – BBC One
- Eve – CBBC. Winner RTS Scotland Best Children's Programme 2016 and RTS Best Sound 2016.
- An Englishman in New York – ITV1. Winner Berlin International Films Festival/Teddy Award 2009. Nominated for 3 BAFTAs.
- The Holding – Feature Film. Winner FANTASPORTO International Fantasy Film Awards 2012
