= Leopard Pictures =

British drama productiom outfit

- Founded: 2001; 25 years ago
- Founders: James Burstall
- Headquarters: London, England
- Parent: Argonon (2011–present)
- Website: leopardpictures.tv

Leopard Pictures (formerly known as Leopard Films and Leopard Drama) is a British television production company that is a subsidiary of international production group Argonon.

== History ==
Leopard Films was first founded in July 2001 when James Burstall stepped down as head of factual at September Films, James Burstall launched a joint-venture production company with London-based British independent televisiom production company Lion Television in which it was called Leopard Television with the newly launched company would be based at Lion Television's headquarters and would share Lion's American offices as James Burstall became the new company's president & CEO

Two years later in September 2003, Leopard Films expanded into the American television production operation with the establishment of its American television production arm based in New York called Leopard Films USA with the newly launched American production arm.

By September 2004, Leopard Films enterted the international distribution operations by launching its own distribution division that would handle distribution of all of Leopard Films' productions in-house named Leopard Distribution to expand the company's management of its intellectual propertywith Leopars Films' founder & president James Burstall heading the company's new distribution arm Leopard Distribution as its CEO alongside sales manager Paul Hanrahan.

Two months later in November of that month, Leopard Films enterted the drama production output by launching its scripted production division named Leopardrama to focus on its drama production activities, marking factual specialist production company Leopard Films expansion into the drama production business as the new drama production division Leopardrama would handle new & returning drama series.

In October 2007, Leopard Films' international distribution arm Leopard Distribution had appointed former ITN Source exec Katie Stephenson as its sales executive of Leopard Distribution.

In May 2011, Leopard Films alongside its drama production arm Leopard Drama, New York-based American production division Leopard USA and the company's international distribution arm Leopard International had joined forces with London-based multi-media entertainment production company Remedy Productions into forming a new independent production group named Argonon as Leopard Films became the factual production of the new group whilst its international arm Leopard Dostrobution was renamed to Argonon Distribution to reflect the establishment of Argonon as James Burstall became the president of the newly formed production group.

== Filmography ==
=== Television series ===
Title	Years	Network	Notes
Missing	2009–2010	BBC One	
Eve	2015–2016	CBBC	
Worzel Gummidge	2019–2021	BBC One	co-production with Lola Entertainment, Treasure Trove Productions and Pidgeon Entertainment
Hard Cell	2022	Netflix	

=== Films ===
Title	Release date	Distributor	Notes
An Englishman in New York	March 26, 2009	Leopard Distribution	
Mimi And The Mountain Dragon	December 26, 2019	BBC Studios Distribution	co-production with Factory
