= Mysterious Creatures =

- Promotional movie poster
- Directed by: David Evans
- Written by: Gwyneth Hughes
- Produced by: Joey Attawia; James Burstall; Julie Clark; Amanda Jenks; Jake Lushington
- Starring: Timothy Spall; Brenda Blethyn; Rebekah Staton
- Cinematography: Matt Gray
- Edited by: Pia Di Ciaula
- Music by: Malcolm Lindsay
- Distributed by: ITV
- Release date: 29 October 2006
- Running time: 90 minutes
- Country: United Kingdom
- Language: English
- Budget: £700,000

Mysterious Creatures is a 2006 British indie drama, directed by David Evans, and starring Timothy Spall, Brenda Blethyn and Rebekah Staton. It is a true story of a married couple struggling to cope with the demands of their daughter with Asperger syndrome.

== Plot ==
It is November 2004, and Bill and Wendy Ainscow are struggling to cope with Social Services' neglect of their daughter, in her 30s and who is autistic. In a desperate attempt to escape, they posted a suicide note to a newspaper and ingested a variety of sleeping pills, walking together into the ocean in the hopes of committing suicide. On this tragic day, Bill lost his life, however Wendy was rescued, leading her to live her life caring for her daughter alone, with no state help, leading her to a second suicide attempt.

The struggles came from the fact that Social Services refused to help lonely, naïve Lisa with social skills so she might get help living life with people (friends and a lover). They outrageously claimed she didn't need such help. Lisa had an addiction to spending money which her parents didn't have on designer shoes and cuddly toys, which would lead to violent outbursts if her demands were not met. Bill had also previously been in prison for stealing £50,000 to pay for his daughter's obsessions.

After the second suicide attempt, both women went on to live the rest of their lives, albeit apart.

== Cast ==
- Timothy Spall as Bill Ainscow
- Brenda Blethyn as Wendy Ainscow
- Rebekah Staton as Lisa Ainscow
- Judy Flynn as Anne Buckley
- David Crellin as David Kirwan
- Stephen Boxer as Martyn Bowler
- Mark Penfold as Judge Bryn
- James Curran as Mr. Justice Mitchell
- Joanna Phillips-Lane as Julie Kirwan
- Alastair Galbraith as Dr. David Yorke

== Production ==
The film was shot on location in London, United Kingdom and Los Cristianos, Spain.

== Accuracy of events ==
Both Lisa and Wendy were interviewed in depth by the writers beforehand to gain a thorough understanding of the events leading up to Bill's suicide and the following events. Wendy has since seen the movie, and was reportedly very moved by the depiction, however Lisa has declined to see the previews when offered.
