= Munya Chawawa =

British-Zimbabwean actor and comedian (born 1992)

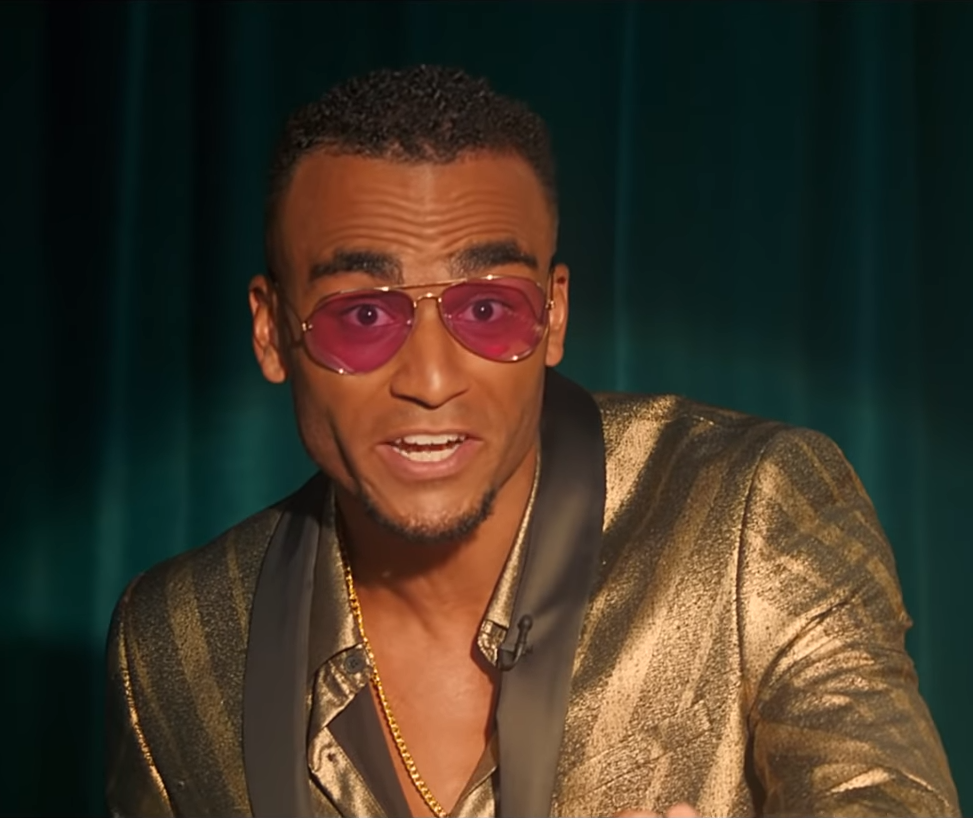
- Chawawa in 2020
- Born: Munyaradzi Oliver Chawawa; 29 December 1992 (age 33); Derby, England
- Education: University of Sheffield
- Occupations: Actor; rapper; comedian
- Writing career
- Genres: Political satire; Observational comedy; Black comedy; Improvisational comedy; Character comedy; Comedy music

Munyaradzi Oliver Chawawa (born 29 December 1992) is a British–Zimbabwean actor, comedian and comedy rapper.

== Early life ==
Munyaradzi Oliver Chawawa was born on 29 December 1992 in Derby, England, and spent his childhood in Zimbabwe where he attended Twin Rivers Primary School. In his youth, his family returned from Zimbabwe to Framingham Pigot, a village close to Norwich in Norfolk. He studied at Notre Dame High School in Norwich, where he was made head boy. He then went on to the University of Sheffield, earning a BSc degree in psychology in 2014.

== Career ==
Chawawa is known for his development and portrayal of characters such as a posh drill rapper called "Unknown P" and the chef "Jonny Oliver". Chawawa has said that he "created Unknown P as a nod towards the appropriation and false ownership of Black culture that often happens in Western societies". His comedic influences are John Oliver, Andy Zaltzman and Sacha Baron Cohen.

His popularity grew during the COVID-19 pandemic in 2020, with the main focus being his 2019 Fire in the Booth freestyle, for the parody news sketches he created. In November 2020, Atlantic Records released his first single, "Piers Morgan", as well as a Daily Duppy on GRM Daily in December. His second single, "Pain au Chocolat" was released in August 2021. He has collaborated with the likes of comedians Mo Gilligan, Michael Dapaah and musicians Unknown T (from whom he derived Unknown P), S1mba, and KSI. In June 2022 he was announced as a contestant for the 14th series of Taskmaster, beginning in October.

On 17 March 2024, Chawawa appeared as a contestant on Celebrity Bake Off Stand Up to Cancer on Channel 4.

In October 2025, Chawawa founded the Black Boys Theatre Club, a community-led project aimed at giving young Black men access to the opportunities in the creative arts space that may feel closed off to them. The project has invited 15 and 16-year-old boys to some of London's biggest theatres, such as the Royal National Theatre and the Regent's Park Open Air Theatre.

== Filmography ==
=== Television ===
Year	Title	Role	Notes	Ref.
2020	Murking From Home	Various	11 episodes	
2020	Deep Issue Massage	Himself	3 episodes	
2021	Belly Must Go	Himself	Episode 6: Wes Nelson and Munya Chawawa	
2021	Samsung Galaxy Gauntlet	Himself	5 episodes	
2021	The Lateish Show with Mo Gilligan	Himself (guest)	1 episode	
2021	Complaints Welcome	Himself	6 episodes	
2021	Superfan vs Super Fan	Himself	2 episodes; host	
2021	The MOBO Awards 2021	Himself	Host	
2021–	Race Around Britain	Himself	5 episodes	
2022	The Sandman	Choronzon	1 episode	
2022	Taskmaster	Himself	10 episodes	
2022	Prince Andrew: The Musical	Prince Charles		
2022	How to Survive a Dictator with Munya Chawawa	Himself	2 episodes	
2023	The Jonathan Ross Show	Himself	Guest	
2023	Would I Lie to You?	Himself	Guest	
2023–2024	Have I Got News for You	Himself	2 episodes; guest	
2024	8 Out of 10 Cats Does Countdown	Himself	Guest	

=== Film ===
Year	Title	Role	Notes	Ref.
2023	Rye Lane	Restaurant Crooner		
2024	The Sidemen Story	Himself	Documentary; Cameo	
