= BriteSpark Films =

British TV productions company, founded 2013

- Founded: January 23, 2013; 12 years ago
- Founders: Nick Godwin
- Headquarters: London, England
- Parent: Argonon
- Divisions: BriteSpark East; BriteSpark West
- Website: britesparkfilms.com

BriteSpark Films is a London-based British television production company owned by international production group Argonon.

== History ==
It was established on 22 January 2013 when London-based international production group Argonon joined forces with former Wag TV head of development and Cineflix head of documentaries and documentary filmmaker Nick Godwin.

On 11 October 2017, BriteSpark Films established a Bristol production office and launched a Bristol-based production division called BriteSpark West. Simon Greenwood became the head of BriteSpark West. Bad Tenants, Rogue Landlords was BriteSpark West's first production.

== Filmography ==
Title	Years	Network	Notes
Hunting Nazi Treasure	2017–2018	More4; History Canada (Canada); American Heroes Channel (United States)	co-production with Saloon Media
World's Most Scenic River Journeys	2021–2022	Channel 5 (United Kingdom); Smithsonian Channel Canada (Canada)	via BriteSpark East co-production with Blue Ant Media and Saloon Media
Norfolk and Suffolk: Country & Coast	2023	Channel 5	via BriteSpark East
Secrets of Flying Scotsman	2025	Channel 4	co-production with BossaNova Media
When Death Comes Knocking	TBA	True Crime	
