= Joey Attawia =

British costume designer

- Born: London, England
- Education: Central Saint Martins
- Occupation: Costume designer
- Years active: 1995–present
- Website: www.joeyattawia.com

Joey Attawia is a British costume designer, film and television producer. Joey is best known for Peggy Su! and An Englishman in New York.

== Career ==
Attawia began his career in 1995 as a costume designer of the English television film 3 Steps to Heaven. After that, he worked on numerous television series including Missing, Murphy's Law, Damilola, Our Loved Boy, Cold Feet and Shameless.

In 2006, in collaboration with James Burstall, Attawia co-produced his first television film, Mysterious Creatures. In 2007, Attawia worked as a costume designer on six episodes of the ITV science-fiction drama Primeval. In 2009, Attawia was the executive producer and costume designer for the biographical film An Englishman in New York. In 2009 and 2010, he produced all episodes of the daytime television crime drama Missing that aired on BBC One.

In 2011, Attawia was the co-executive producer of the thriller film The Holding. He is the founding director of international group Argonon, and the executive producer and strategic advisor of Leopard Pictures.

== Awards and nominations ==
During Attawia's career, he received the Royal Television Society Award for Best Costume Design – Drama for his work in the 1998 film Peggy Su!, and nominated for the BAFTA TV Award as well as nominated for Royal Television Society Award for Best Costume Design – Drama for An Englishman in New York.
