= Peggy Su! =

- Directed by: Frances-Anne Solomon
- Written by: Kevin Wong
- Produced by: Poonam Sharma; Colin Rogers
- Starring: Jonathan Arun; Jacqueline Chan; Daphne Cheung; Alphonsia Emmanuel; Glen Goei; Burt Kwouk; Pamela Oei
- Cinematography: Shelley Hirst
- Edited by: Greg Miller
- Music by: Peter Spencer
- Distributed by: BBC Worldwide
- Release date: 1998
- Running time: 100 minutes
- Country: United Kingdom
- Language: English

Peggy Su! is a 1998 film written by Anglo-Chinese playwright Kevin Wong, directed by Frances-Anne Solomon and starring Pamela Oei. His own experience and background being the son of Chinese immigrants working in the laundry business was used. It was directed by Trinidadian Frances-Anne Solomon who had previously worked on What My Mother Told Me in 1994 and Bideshi in 1996.

== About the film ==
This romantic comedy set in Liverpool in 1962. It is about the Chinese community there and 19-year-old Peggy who lives above a family laundry business with her brother and his wife. it centers on Peggy (Pamela Oei) her attempts to find a husband and also her coping with the changing times in the early 1960s.

The film has the distinction of being the first feature film to receive National Lottery funding. It was joint funded with the BBC. It was distributed by BBC Worldwide.

== Film festival and award ==
=== Festival ===
- Reel Word Film Festival Canada (2001)
- Overseas Chinese Fim Festival Glasgow (2002)

=== Award ===
- RTS Television Award & BAFTA winner for best Costume Design by Joey Attawia.

=== Review ===
- The Independent Sunday 23 August 1998
- Positif n° 448, Page 41 & 60, 1998

== Cast ==
- Jonathan Arun as Brian
- Jacqui Chan as Ifec Mah
- Daphne Cheung as Jackie
- Alphonsia Emmanuel as Miss James
- Glen Goei as David
- Burt Kwouk as Dad
- Pamela Oei as Peggy
- Charles T.H. Ong as David's father
- Adrian Pang as Gilbert
- Vincenzo Pellegrino as Terry
- Stuart Richma as Vicar
- Sukie Smith as Rita
- Daniel York as Jack
- Barbara Yu Ling as David's mother

== Crew (selective) ==
- Screenplay ... Kevin Wong
- Executive producer ... George Faber
- Associate producer ... Yvonne Isimeme Ibazebo
- Director of photography ... Shelley Hirst
- Casting ... Carl Proctor
- Production design ... Choi Ho Man
- Costume design ... Joey Attawia
- Makeup artist ... Natasha Chambers
- Makeup designer ... Sharon Martin
- First assistant director ... Julian Holmes
- Second assistant director ... Pauline Oni
- Third assistant director ... Mzee Coffey, Lab Ky Mo

=== Company credits ===
==== Production ====
- Production Companies ... Arts Council of England, BBC Films,
- The Mersyside Film Production Fund

==== Other ====
- ADR Facility ... Goldcrest Post Production London
- Post production sound services ... The Sound Design Company
