= The Masked Dancer (British TV series) =

British television series

- Genre: Reality competition; Panel show
- Based on: The King of Mask Singer by Munhwa Broadcasting Corporation
- Creative director: Beth Honan
- Presented by: Joel Dommett
- Starring: Davina McCall; Oti Mabuse; Jonathan Ross; Mo Gilligan; Peter Crouch
- Theme music composer: Marc Sylvan; Victoria Horn
- Country of origin: United Kingdom
- Original language: English
- No. of series: 2
- No. of episodes: 15

Production
- Executive producers: Claire Horton; Derek McLean; Daniel Nettleton; Iain Peckham
- Production location: ITV Studios Bovingdon
- Camera setup: Multi-camera
- Production company: Bandicoot

Original release
- Network: ITV
- Release: 29 May 2021 – 22 October 2022

Related
- The Masked Singer

The Masked Dancer is a British reality dancing competition television series that premiered on ITV on 29 May 2021. It was based on the original programme The King of Mask Singer. In December 2021, the show was recommissioned for a second series which aired September–October 2022. In March 2024, it was announced by ITV that the show had been cancelled.

== Production ==
On 4 March 2021, it was announced that ITV were producing a local version of the American television dancing competition The Masked Dancer following the success of its sister show The Masked Singer. The show is produced by the British television production company Bandicoot, part of the Argonon Group, the same company who produced The Masked Singer. The series was commissioned as a replacement in the spring schedule for Britain's Got Talent, which had its upcoming fifteenth series postponed until 2022 due to health and safety concerns surrounding the COVID-19 pandemic. The show premiered on 29 May 2021, consisting of 12 contestants competing through seven episodes, which were broadcast across eight nights throughout the following week.

In December 2021, ITV commissioned a second series of eight episodes, which premiered on 3 September 2022. The second series was broadcast in weekly instalments.

== Cancellation ==
On 14 February 2023, it was revealed that the show would not be returning in 2023, due to ITV's coverage of the 2023 Rugby World Cup. Despite this, the show was fully cancelled in 2024.

== Cast ==
=== Panellists and host ===
Former series panellists and host

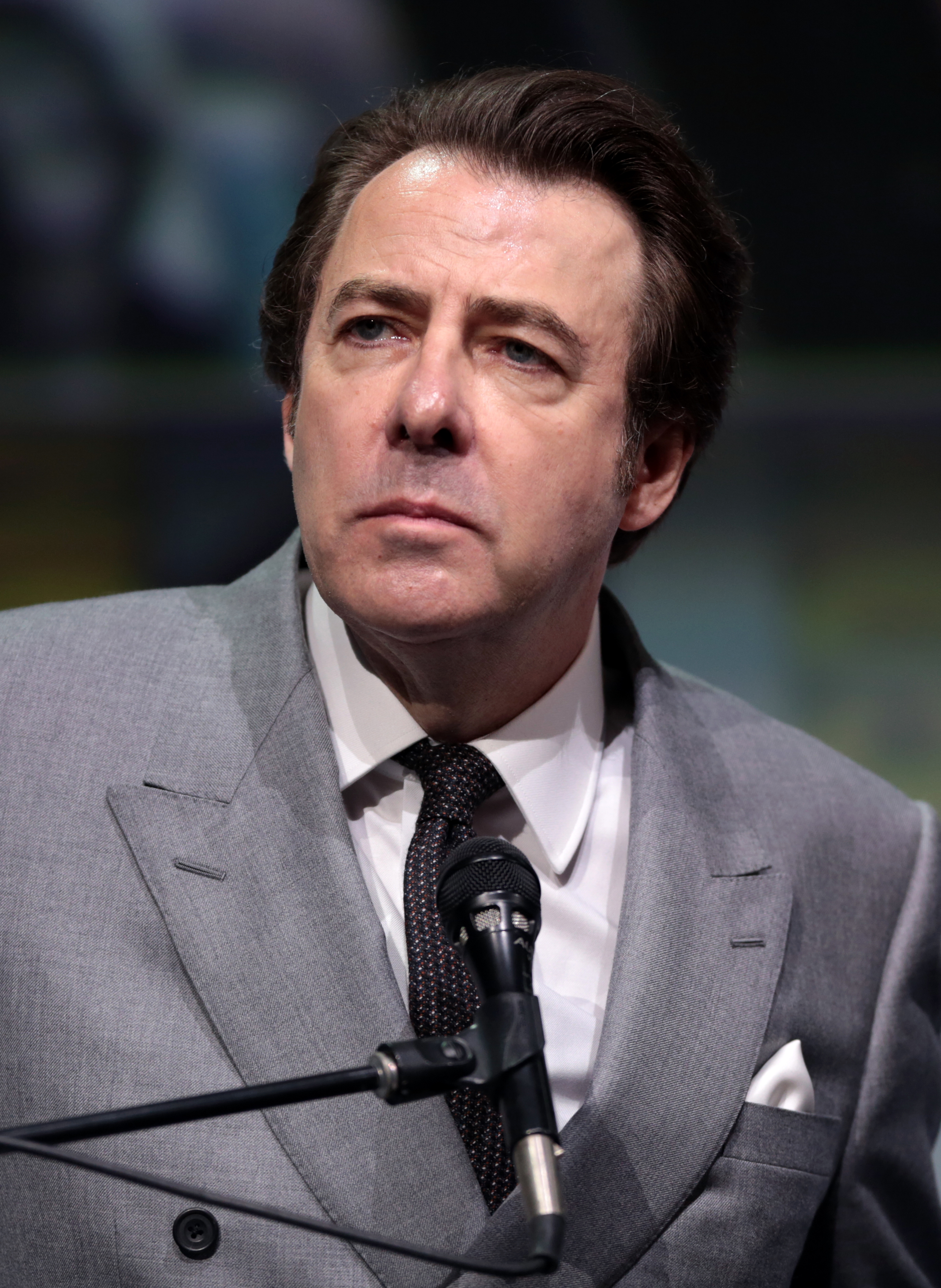
Jonathan Ross

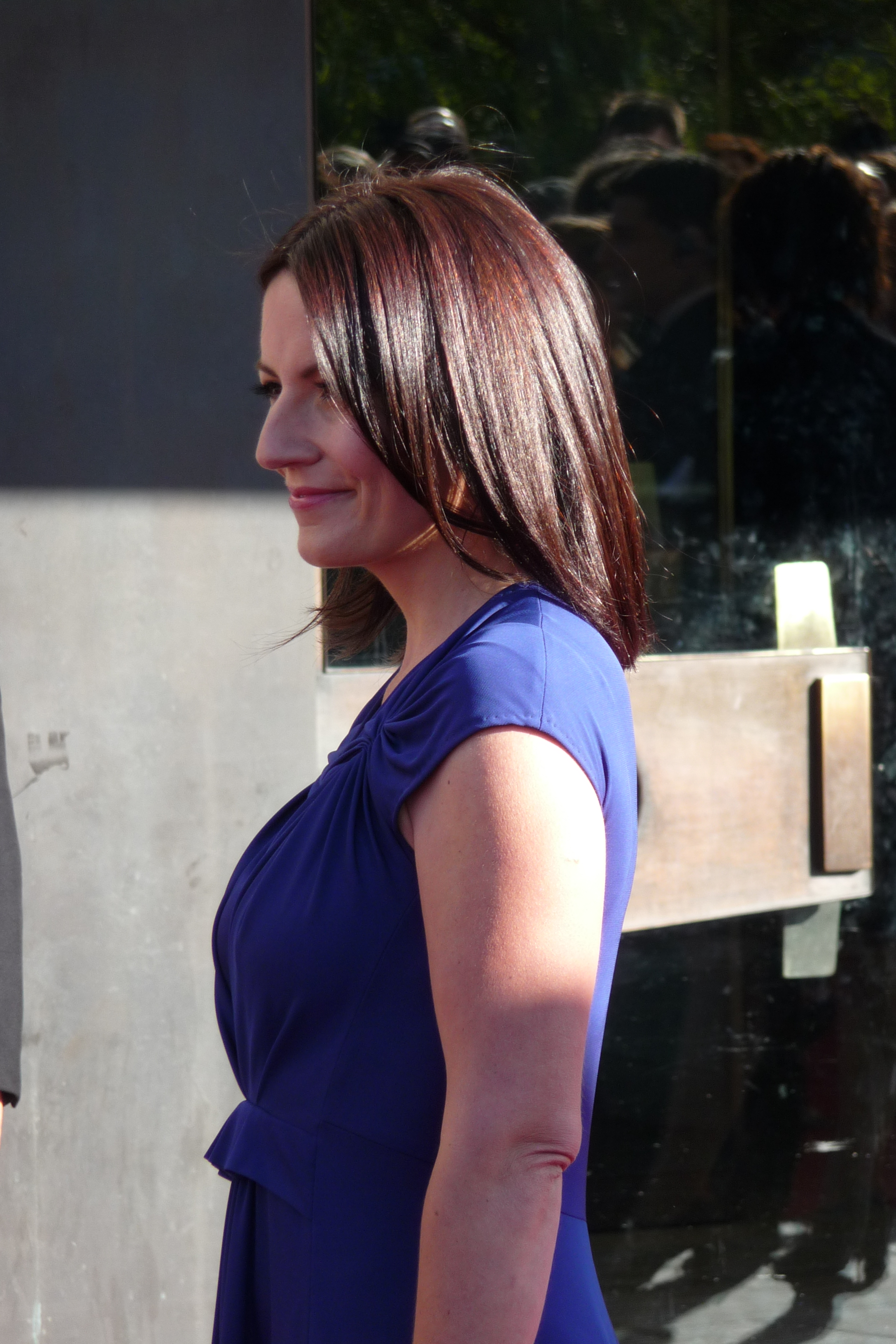
Davina McCall

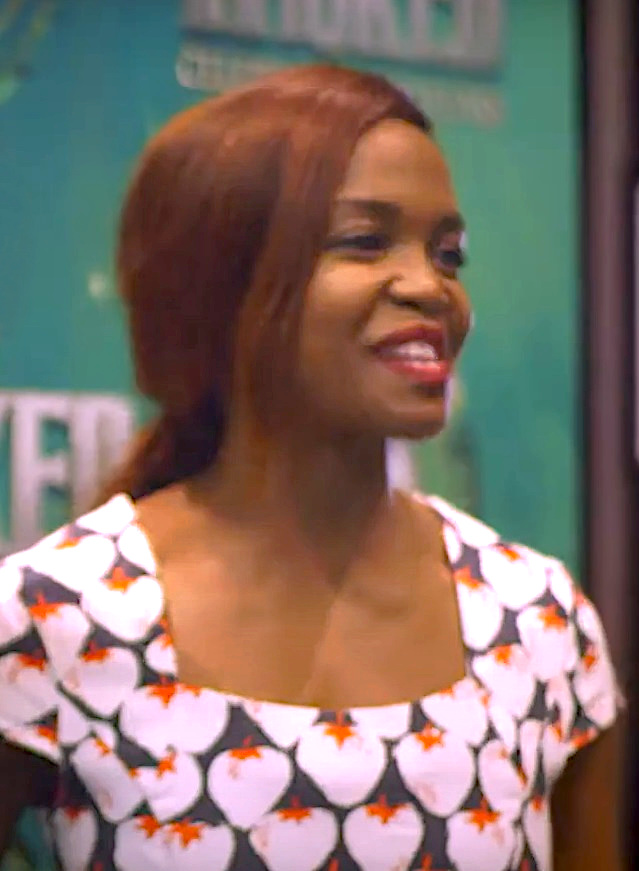
Oti Mabuse

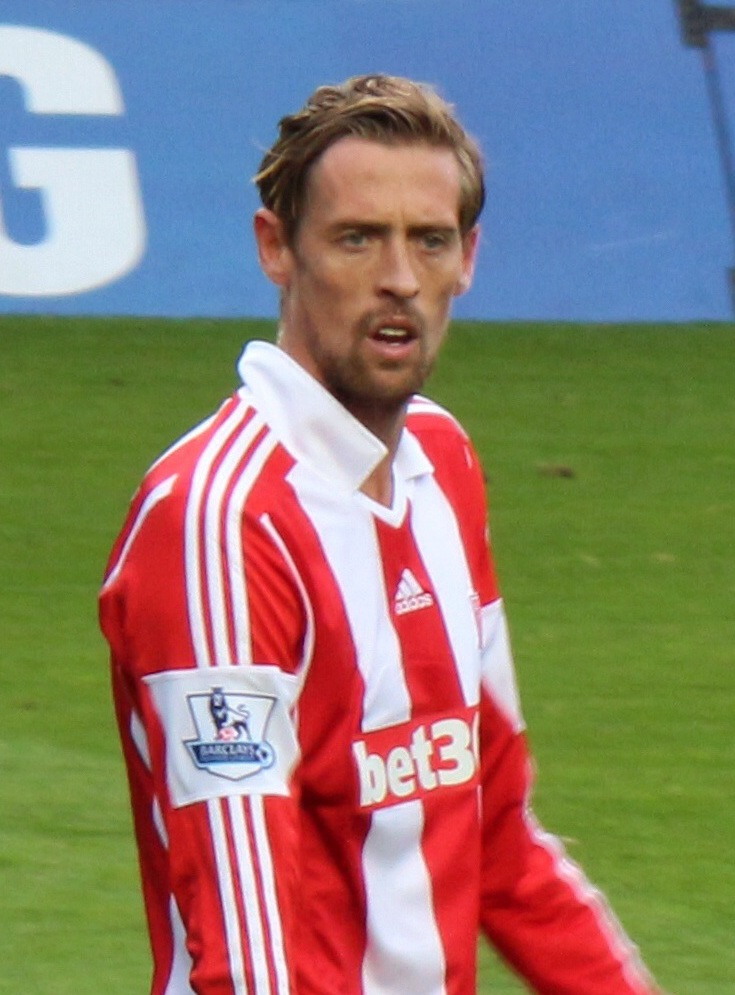
Peter Crouch

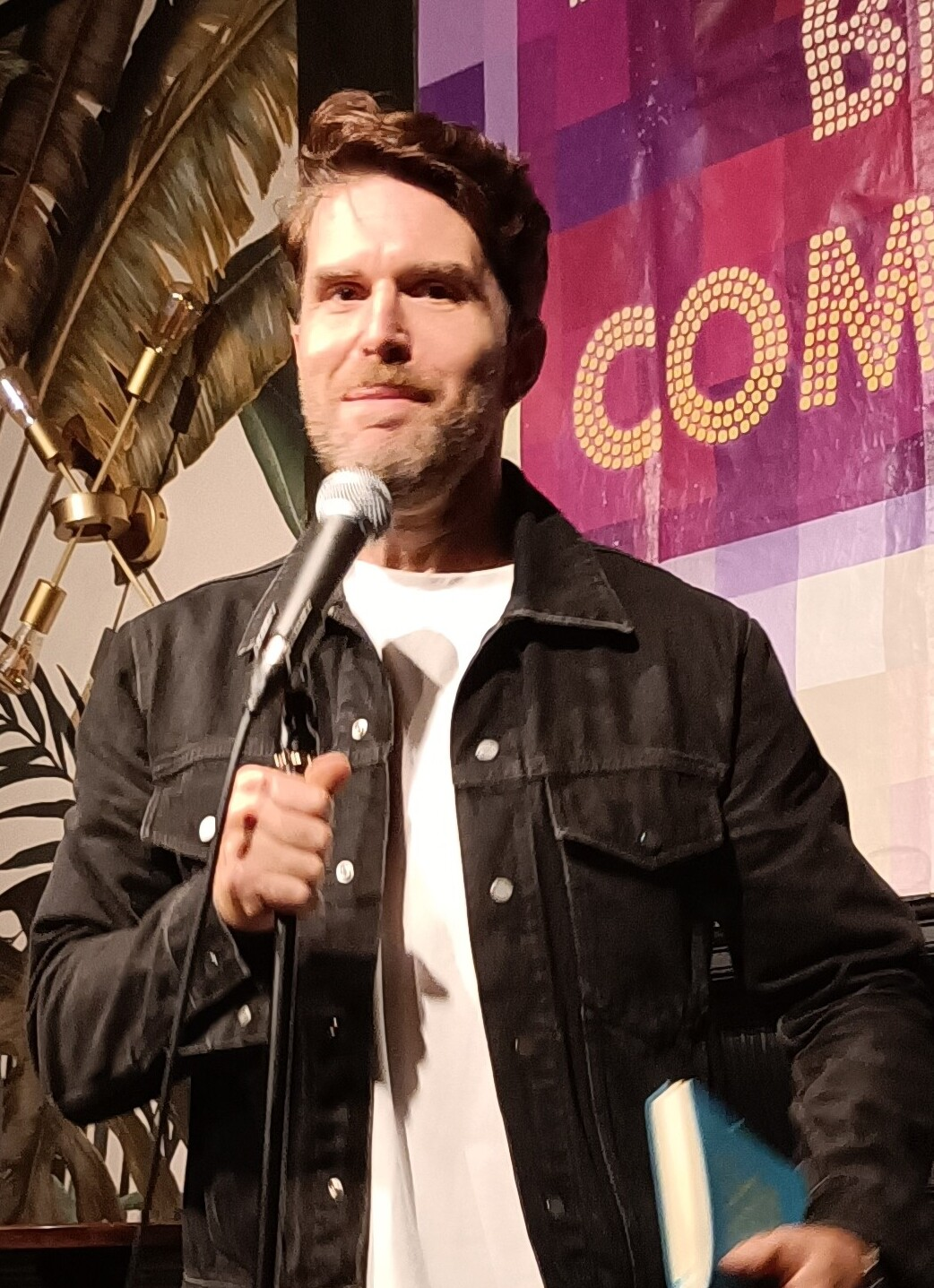
Joel Dommett

Following the announcement of the series, it was confirmed by ITV that the panel would consist of presenter and comedian Jonathan Ross, television presenter Davina McCall, and comedian Mo Gilligan, who are all panellists on The Masked Singer, along with Strictly Come Dancing professional Oti Mabuse. It was also confirmed that Joel Dommett would host the show.

Guest panellists in the first series included David Walliams in the fifth episode, John Bishop in the sixth episode, and Holly Willoughby in the seventh episode.

On 3 May 2022, it was announced that footballer Peter Crouch would join the panel for the second series, with Ross, McCall, and Mabuse all returning. Series one panellist Gilligan was unable to return due to touring commitments, but served as a guest panelist on the sixth show. John Bishop returned as a guest panelist on the seventh show and sat in on the final for Ross, who was absent. Dawn French was also a guest on the panel for the final.

== Series overview ==
Series overview
Series	Contestants	Episodes	Originally released		Winner	Runner-up	Third place	Average viewers (millions)
Series	Contestants	Episodes	First released	Last released	Winner	Runner-up	Third place	Average viewers (millions)
1	12	7	29 May 2021	5 June 2021	Louis Smith as "Carwash"	Bonnie Langford as "Squirrel"	Howard Donald as "Zip"	TBA
2	12	8	3 September 2022	22 October 2022	Heather Morris as "Scissors"	Adam Garcia as "Onomatopoeia"	Bruno Tonioli as "Pearly King"	TBA
