= The Masked Singer (British TV series) =

British reality singing competition television series

- Genre: Reality competition; Panel show
- Based on: King of Mask Singer by Munhwa Broadcasting Corporation
- Creative director: Beth Honan
- Presented by: Joel Dommett
- Starring: Ken Jeong; Davina McCall; Rita Ora; Jonathan Ross; Mo Gilligan; Maya Jama
- Theme music composer: Marc Sylvan; Victoria Horn
- Country of origin: United Kingdom
- Original language: English
- No. of series: 7
- No. of episodes: 62

Production
- Executive producers: Claire Horton; Derek McLean; Daniel Nettleton
- Producer: Tom Gills
- Production location: ITV Studios Bovingdon
- Camera setup: Multi-camera
- Running time: 90 mins (inc. adverts)
- Production company: Bandicoot

Original release
- Network: ITV
- Release: 4 January 2020 – present

Related
- The Masked Dancer

The Masked Singer is a British reality singing competition television series that premiered on ITV on 4 January 2020. It is based on the Masked Singer franchise that originated from the South Korean show King of Mask Singer, which features celebrities singing famous songs while wearing head-to-toe costumes and face masks concealing their identities. In February 2022, the show was recommissioned for a fourth and fifth series. The show won an International Emmy for Best Non-Scripted Entertainment in 2021.

== Production ==
On 31 May 2019, it was announced that ITV was producing a local version of the South Korean television singing competition King of Mask Singer, originally broadcast by the Munhwa Broadcasting Corporation, for the British television market. The production is made by British television production company Bandicoot, part of the Argonon Group.

On 25 January 2020, it was announced that the show would be returning for a second series. On 30 April 2020, it was reported that they were considering filming the new series without an audience due to the COVID-19 pandemic. It was later announced on 17 August 2020 that filming would begin on 14 September with safety precautions in place. On 1 December 2020, it was announced that the second series would premiere on 26 December 2020, with a "The Story So Far" recap airing on 19 December.

On 14 February 2022, following the conclusion of the third series, ITV announced the commission of a fourth and fifth series. The fourth series began on 1 January 2023. The fifth series began on 30 December 2023.

== Cast ==
=== Panellists and host ===
Current series panellists and host

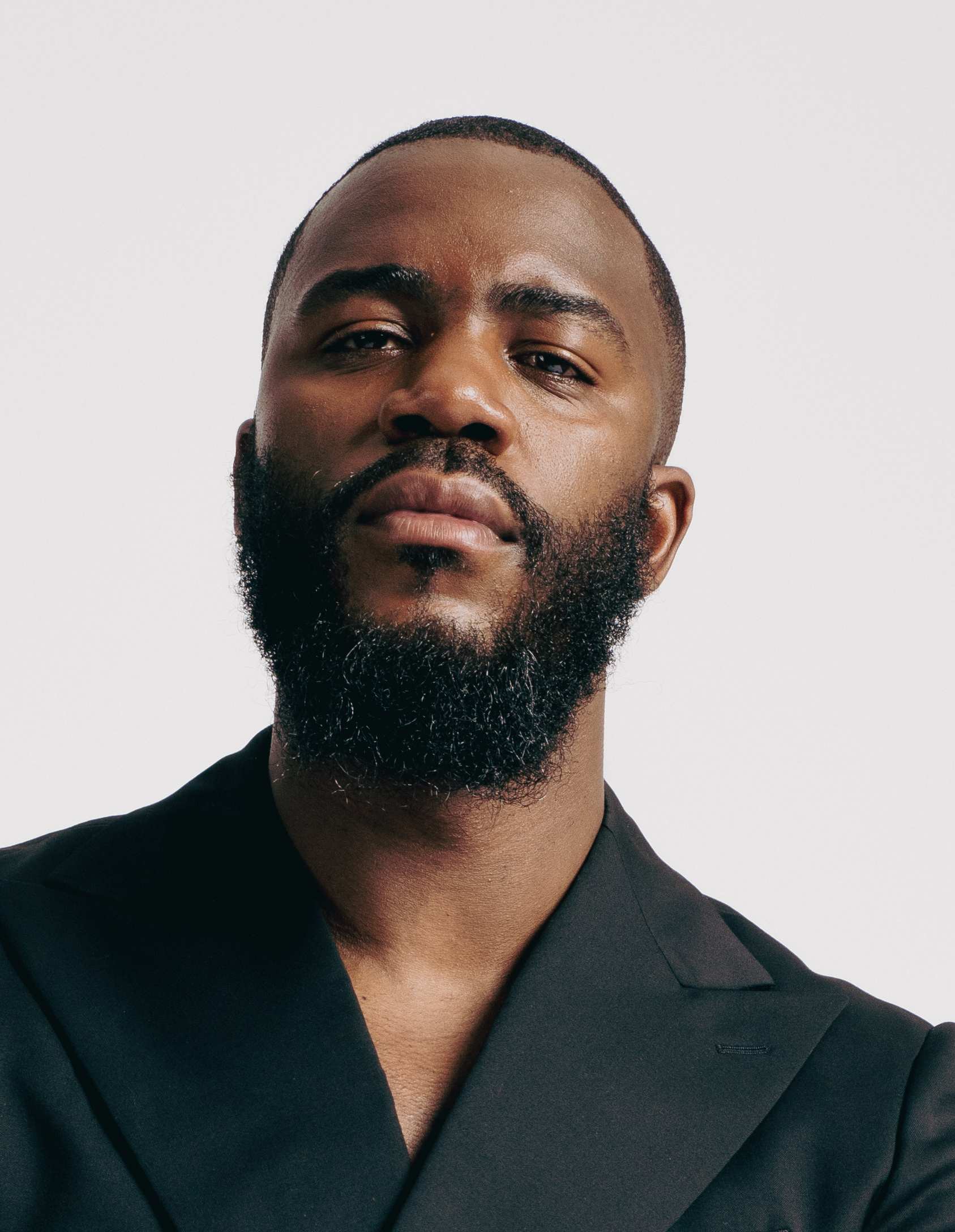
Mo Gilligan

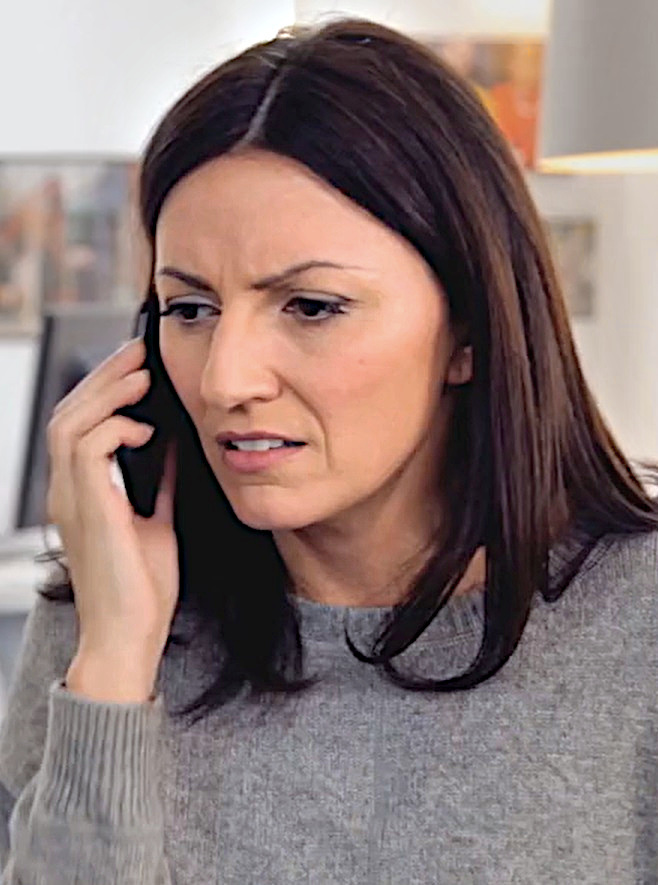
Davina McCall

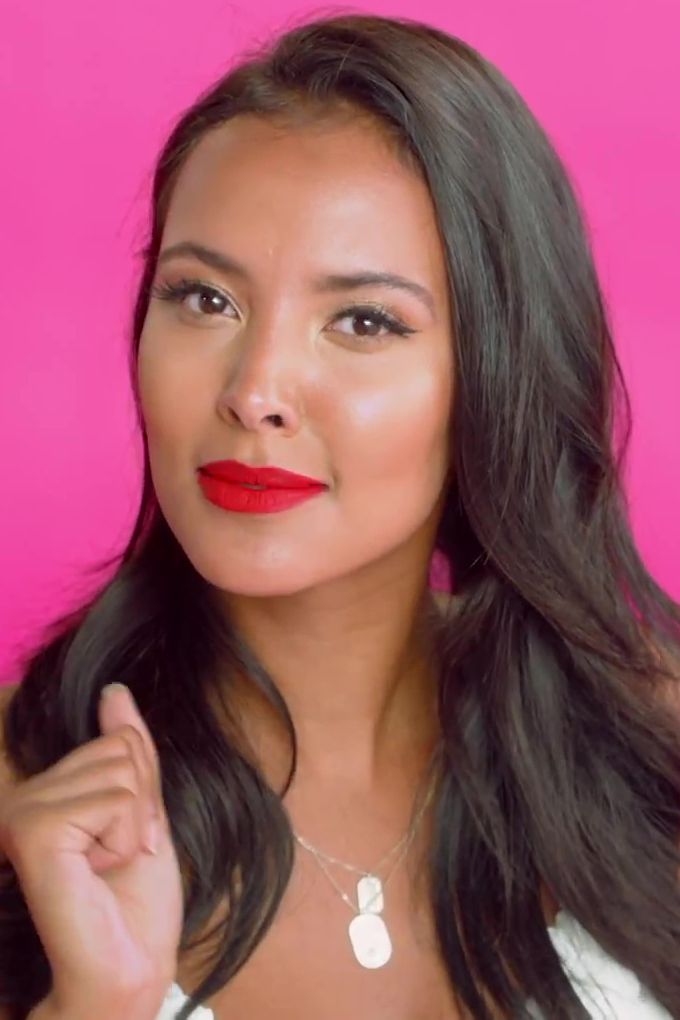
Maya Jama

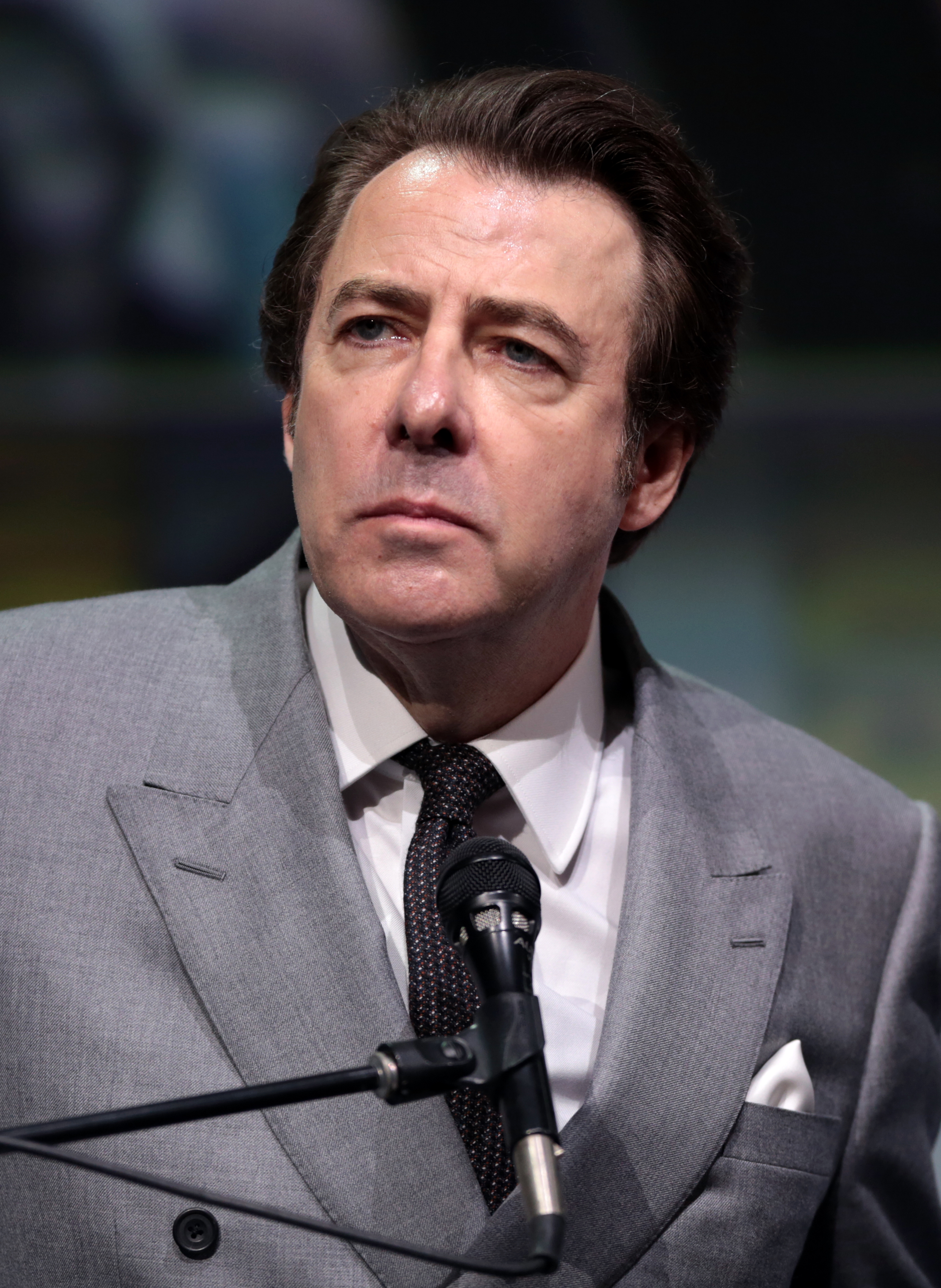
Jonathan Ross

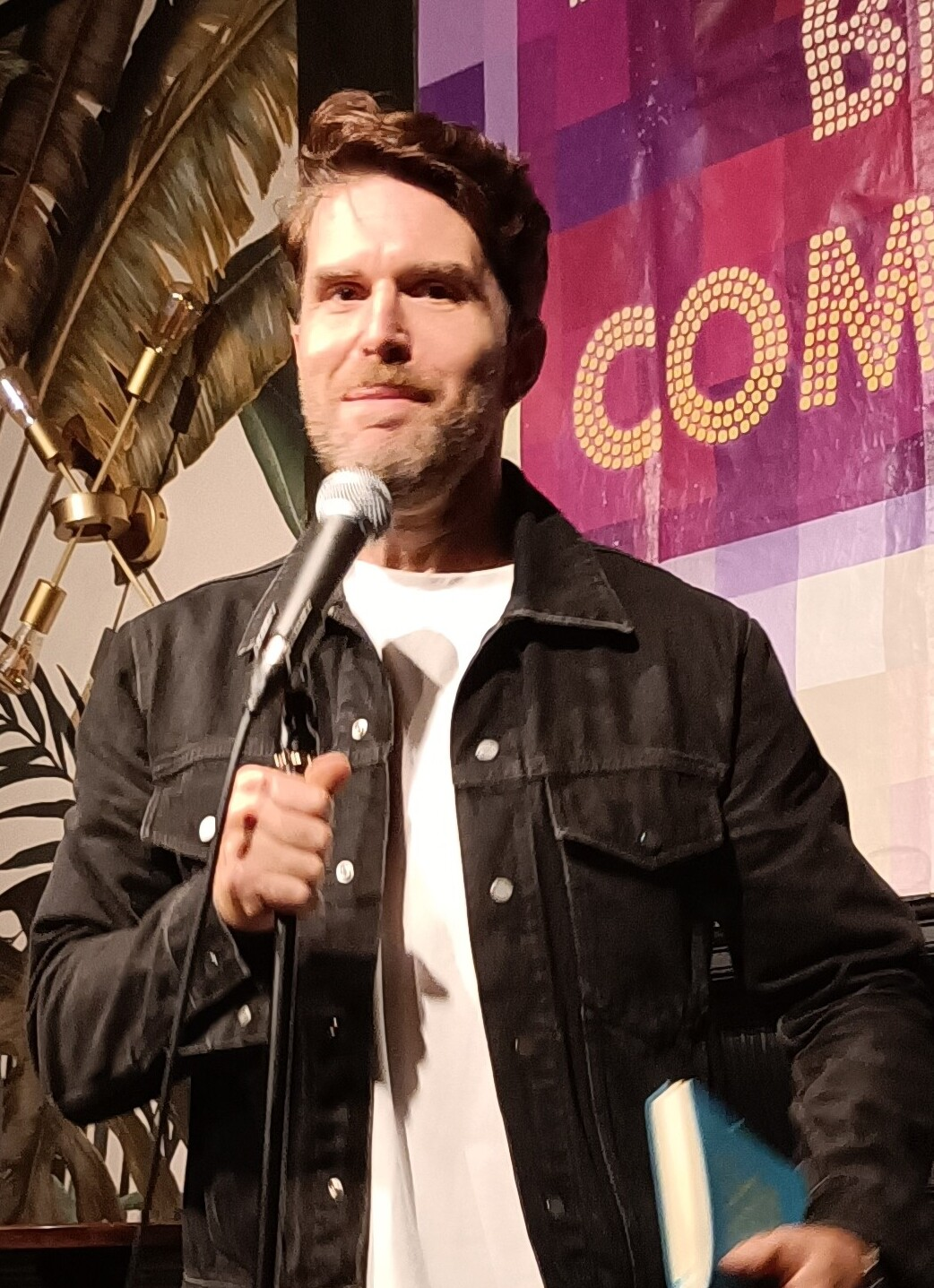
Joel Dommett

Following the announcement of the series, it was confirmed by ITV that the panel would consist of presenter and comedian Jonathan Ross, television presenter Davina McCall, American actor and comedian Ken Jeong (who is also a panellist on the American version of the programme), and singer-songwriter and actress Rita Ora. It was also confirmed that Joel Dommett would host the show.

On 19 August 2020, it was announced that British comedian Mo Gilligan would replace Ken Jeong on the panel for series two, due to travel restrictions from COVID-19 preventing his participation. Gilligan has continued to serve as a panellist in subsequent series of the show. Maya Jama was announced as a replacement for Rita Ora (who became a panellist on the American version) on 25 September 2024, taking her place on the panel for series six.

Cast timeline
Cast Member	Series						
Cast Member	1	2	3	4	5	6	7
Panel
Davina McCall	Main (Note: McCall appeared as "Star" in the 2024 Christmas special.)	Main	Main	Main	Main	Main	Main
Jonathan Ross	Main	Main	Main	Main	Main	Main	Main
Rita Ora	Main	Main	Main	Main	Main		
Ken Jeong	Main						
Donny Osmond	Guest						
Kelly Osbourne	Guest						
Sharon Osbourne	Guest						
Mo Gilligan		Main	Main	Main	Main	Main	Main
Alan Carr		Guest					
Matt Lucas		Guest					Guest (Note: Two exclusive masks, "Goldfish" and "Emperor Penguin", fronted their own bands "No Trout" and "Antarctic Funkeys" in the first and second episodes respectively. "Emperor Penguin" was revealed to be Matt Lucas and "Goldfish" was Anne-Marie; both subsequently joined the panel.)
Nicola Roberts	Mask	Guest					
Olly Alexander			Guest				
Joan Collins			Guest				
Joss Stone		Mask	Guest				
Stephen Mulhern				Guest			
Peter Crouch				Guest			
Lee Mack				Guest			
Charlie Simpson				Mask	Guest		
Olly Murs					Guest		Guest (Note: An additional mask, "Mole Dommett", appeared in the fifth episode to provide extra clues for the panel; it was revealed as Murs in the following episode.)
Jennifer Saunders (Note: Also served as a guest panellist for the 2024 Christmas special alongside Dawn French.)					Guest		
Ellie Goulding					Guest		
Lenny Henry		Mask			Guest		
Lorraine Kelly					Guest (Note: Kelly was revealed as "Owl" in the fifth episode of this series.)		
Rob Brydon					Guest		
Maya Jama						Main	Main
Mo Farah						Guest (Note: Farah served as a guest panellist for the first episode after being revealed as "Giant Joel".)	
Vicky McClure						Guest	
Suranne Jones						Guest	
Tom Daley						Guest	
Richard E. Grant						Guest	
Danny Jones					Mask	Guest	
Anne-Marie							Guest
Freddie Flintoff							Guest
Ben Shephard							Guest (Note: Shephard was revealed as "Conkers" in the final of this series.)
Perrie Edwards							Guest
Katherine Ryan				Mask			Guest
Samantha Barks						Mask	Guest
Host
Joel Dommett	Main	Main	Main	Main	Main	Main	Main

== Series overview ==
Series overview
Series	Contestants	Episodes	Originally released		Winner	Runner-up	Third place	Average viewers (millions)
Series	Contestants	Episodes	First released	Last released	Winner	Runner-up	Third place	Average viewers (millions)
1	12	8	4 January 2020	15 February 2020	Nicola Roberts as "Queen Bee"	Jason Manford as "Hedgehog"	Katherine Jenkins as "Octopus"	6.47
2	12	8	26 December 2020	13 February 2021	Joss Stone as "Sausage"	Ne-Yo as "Badger"	Aston Merrygold as "Robin"	7.64
3	12	8	1 January 2022	12 February 2022	Natalie Imbruglia as "Panda"	Charlotte Church as "Mushroom"	Mark Feehily as "Robobunny"	6.07
4	12	8	1 January 2023	18 February 2023	Charlie Simpson as "Rhino"	Ricky Wilson as "Phoenix"	Natalie Appleton as "Fawn"	5.50
5	12	8	30 December 2023	17 February 2024	Danny Jones as "Piranha"	Alex Brooker as "Bigfoot"	Lemar as "Cricket"	4.81
6	12	8	4 January 2025	15 February 2025	Samantha Barks as "Pufferfish"	Gregory Porter as "Dressed Crab"	Marti Pellow as "Wolf"	4.38
7	12	8	3 January 2026	14 February 2026	Keisha Buchanan as "Moth"	Ben Shephard as "Conkers"	Mica Paris as "Toastie"	3.34

== Awards and nominations ==
Year	Award	Category	Result	Ref.
2021	British Academy Television Awards	Entertainment Programme	Nominated	
2023	British Academy Television Awards	Entertainment Programme	Won	
2022	British Academy Television Craft Awards	Entertainment Craft Team	Nominated	
2022	Broadcasting Press Guild Awards	Best Entertainment	Nominated	
2021	International Emmy Awards	Non-Scripted Entertainment	Won	
2020	Royal Television Society	Costume Design – Entertainment & Non Drama	Won	
2021	Royal Television Society	Costume Design – Entertainment & Non Drama	Nominated	
2021	Royal Television Society	Entertainment	Won	
2022	Royal Television Society	Entertainment	Nominated	
2023	National Television Awards	The Bruce Forsyth Entertainment Award	Nominated	

== Spin-offs and related shows ==
=== Home Alone with Joel Dommett ===
On 26 April 2020, Dommett invited panellists McCall and Ross to appear on his show, Home Alone with Joel Dommett, on ITV2 to take part in a one-off special of The Masked Singer. With COVID-19 spreading and residents of the United Kingdom under lockdown, Dommett had to conference call the panellists where they had to guess the identities of three masked celebrities. McCall and Ross were tasked with not only guessing their identities, but also deciding on an overall 'winner' and 'runner-up'.

The celebrities' performances were pre-recorded and consisted of them singing, followed by a hint to their identity, before their reveal at the end of the segment. Rather than the typical costumes and masks that contestants usually wear on the show, the recordings were edited to hide each singer's face with a specific image.

Performances on Home Alone with Joel Dommett
#	Stage name	Song	Identity	Result
1	Teddy Bear	"Sex Bomb" by Tom Jones	Ore Oduba	RUNNER-UP
2	Smiley Face	"Sweat (A La La La La Long)" by Inner Circle	James Argent	THIRD
3	Robot	"...Baby One More Time" by Britney Spears	Chesney Hawkes	WINNER

=== The Masked Singer: Unmasked ===
The Masked Singer: Unmasked is the companion show presented by Capital Xtra's Will Njobvu. It is shown on the ITV Hub straight after the main show and is later aired on ITV2 the following Saturday. The show features interviews from the judges and the unmasked celebrity from that episode. It takes us behind the scenes to see what actually goes on at the "most secretive show on TV". The show did not return for the third series, though in the sixth series, it was replaced by a new companion show known as The Masked Singer: The After Mask, presented by Kiss presenter Harriet Rose. For the seventh series it was renamed to its original name of Unmasked.

=== The Masked Dancer ===
On 4 March 2021, it was announced that ITV commissioned a dancing spinoff series that shares the same name of the American version. The series had 12 contestants competing through seven episodes, and was hosted by Dommett, with Ross, Gilligan, McCall, and Oti Mabuse serving as panellists. It premiered on 29 May 2021, filling in the late spring 2021 slot of Britain's Got Talent, which had its upcoming series 15 postponed until 2022 due to health and safety concerns regarding the COVID-19 pandemic.

The show returned for a second series in the Autumn of 2022 with Mo Gilligan replaced as panelist by Peter Crouch due to other commitments that Gilligan had at the time of taping. In 2023, nothing was aired as a result of ITV's coverage of the 2023 Rugby World Cup and by 2024, the broadcaster announced their overall decision to cancel the show in its entirety rather than renew it for a third series.

== Special episodes ==
=== I'm a Celebrity specials ===
On 30 August 2022, it was announced that ITV had commissioned a one-off I'm a Celebrity...Get Me Out of Here! special of The Masked Singer, would air on 6 November 2022, ahead of the launch show for the 2022 series. The special saw four former campmates perform in costume, with their identities revealed over the course of the episode. Dommett hosted the special and was joined by regular The Masked Singer panellists Gilligan, McCall, Ora, and Ross. John Thomson, who had previously competed in the second series as "Bush Baby", reprised his role to provide the panel with clues for the competitors. The special returned in 2023, once again airing immediately prior to the launch show.

==== Special 1 (6 November 2022) ====
- Group performance: "Down Under" by Men at Work

First performances on The Masked Singer: I'm a Celebrity Special
#	Stage Name	Song	Identity	Result
1	Witchetty Grub	"Moving On Up" by M People	Alison Hammond	OUT
2	Koala	"Could It Be Magic" by Take That	undisclosed	WIN
3	Cockroach	Go the Distance by Michael Bolton	Russell Watson	OUT
4	Kangaroo	"Lush Life" by Zara Larsson	undisclosed	WIN

Second performances on The Masked Singer: I'm a Celebrity Special
#	Stage Name	Song	Identity	Result
1	Koala	"If I Can Dream" by Elvis Presley	Vernon Kay	WINNER
2	Kangaroo	"Just Got Paid" by Sigala, Ella Eyre & Meghan Trainor feat. French Montana	Sinitta	RUNNER-UP

==== Special 2 (19 November 2023) ====
- Group performance: "Welcome To The Jungle" by Guns N' Roses

First performances on The Masked Singer: I'm a Celebrity Special
#	Stage Name	Song	Identity	Result
1	Dunny	"She Bangs" by Ricky Martin	undisclosed	WIN
2	Huntsman	"Love Really Hurts Without You" by Billy Ocean	Linford Christie	OUT
3	Bearded Dragon	"Time To Say Goodbye" by Andrea Bocelli & Sarah Brightman	undisclosed	WIN
4	Wombat	"Brown Eyed Girl" by Van Morrison	Andy Whyment	OUT

Second performances on The Masked Singer: I'm a Celebrity Special
#	Stage Name	Song	Identity	Result
1	Dunny	"Cake By The Ocean" by DNCE	Joe Pasquale	WINNER
2	Bearded Dragon	"Blow Your Mind (Mwah)" by Dua Lipa	Myleene Klass	RUNNER-UP

=== Christmas specials ===
==== Special 1 (25 December 2023) ====
- Guest judge: Leona Lewis
- Group performance: "One More Sleep" by Leona Lewis

First performances on The Masked Singer: Christmas Special
#	Stage Name	Song	Identity	Result
1	Partridge (in a Pear Tree)	"It's the Most Wonderful Time of the Year" by Andy Williams	undisclosed	WIN
2	Sprout	"Good King Wenceslas" Traditional song	Tony Robinson	OUT
3	Decorations	"Merry Christmas Everyone" by Shakin' Stevens	Julian Clary	OUT
4	Reindeer	"Rockin' Around the Christmas Tree" by Brenda Lee	undisclosed	WIN

Second performances on The Masked Singer: Christmas Special
#	Stage Name	Song	Identity	Result
1	Partridge (in a Pear Tree)	"Holly Jolly Christmas" by Burl Ives	Ainsley Harriott	WINNER
2	Reindeer	"Underneath the Tree" by Kelly Clarkson	Carol Vorderman	RUNNER-UP

==== Special 2 (26 December 2024) ====
- Guest judges: Dawn French and Jennifer Saunders
  - McCall rejoined the panel after being unmasked as a contestant
- Group performance: "I Wish It Could Be Christmas Everyday" by Wizzard

First performances on The Masked Singer: Christmas Special
#	Stage Name	Song	Identity	Result
1	Christmas Cracker	"Sleigh Ride" by The Ronettes	Josie Gibson	OUT
2	Star	"Have Yourself a Merry Little Christmas" by Judy Garland	undisclosed	WIN
3	Turkey Crown	"Wonderful Christmastime" by Paul McCartney	Motsi Mabuse	OUT
4	Nutcracker	"Driving Home for Christmas" by Chris Rea	undisclosed	WIN

Second performances on The Masked Singer: Christmas Special
#	Stage Name	Song	Identity	Result
1	Star	"This Christmas" by Donny Hathaway	Davina McCall	RUNNER-UP
2	Nutcracker	"The Christmas Song" by Mel Tormé	Holly Johnson	WINNER

Bonus performance on The Masked Singer: Christmas Special
#	Stage Name	Song	Identity	Result
1	Giant Joel	"Hello" by Lionel Richie	Mo Farah	GUEST (Note: Giant Joel, an additional masked singer based on presenter Dommett, was introduced in the 2024 Christmas special and was automatically unmasked in the first episode of the sixth series.)

==== Special 3 (26 December 2025) ====
- Group performance: "Merry Xmas Everybody" by Slade

First performances on The Masked Singer: Christmas Special
#	Stage Name	Song	Identity	Result
1	Mistletoe	"Fairytale of New York" by The Pogues feat. Kirsty MacColl	undisclosed	WIN
2	Goose-A-Laying	"I Saw Mommy Kissing Santa Claus" by The Jackson Five	Maureen Lipman	OUT
3	Figgy Pudding	"When a Child Is Born" by Johnny Mathis	undisclosed	WIN
4	Santa's Sack	"Run Rudolph Run" by Chuck Berry	Floella Benjamin	OUT

Second performances on The Masked Singer: Christmas Special
#	Stage Name	Song	Identity	Result
1	Mistletoe	"Last Christmas" by Wham!	Dermot O'Leary	WINNER
2	Figgy Pudding	"Step Into Christmas" by Elton John	Scott Mills	RUNNER-UP

== The Masked Singer Live tour ==
A live arena tour of the show began during the 2022 Easter holidays, travelling across the UK. The tour consisted of two touring judges, Denise van Outen (who appeared as "Fox" in series one) and Aston Merrygold (who appeared as "Robin" in series two), with a guest judge at each location. Panda, Dragon, Unicorn, Badger and Traffic Cone starred on the tour with two new characters: Space Pug and Baby Dino, who were unmasked at every performance.

Venue	Date	Venue Judge	Space Pug	Baby Dino
Liverpool, M&S Bank Arena	2 April 2022	Samia Longchambon	Simon Gregson	Sinitta
London, O2 Arena	3 April 2022	Jonathan Ross	Bill Bailey	Maisie Smith
Birmingham, Utilita Arena	5 April 2022	Mo Gilligan	Lee Latchford-Evans	Claire Sweeney
Newcastle, Utilita Arena	8 April 2022	Scarlett Moffatt	Ranj Singh	Jenny Ryan
Glasgow, OVO Hydro	9 April 2022	Sanjeev Kohli	Ranj Singh	Sinitta
Manchester, AO Arena	10 April 2022	Nicola Roberts	Lee Latchford-Evans	Jacqueline Jossa
Leeds, First Direct Arena	13 April 2022	Nicola Roberts	Duncan James	Jenny Ryan
Sheffield, Utilita Arena	15 April 2022	Martine McCutcheon	Lee Latchford-Evans	Claire Sweeney
Nottingham, Motorpoint Arena	16 April 2022	Natalie Imbruglia	Ranj Singh	Maisie Smith
Wembley, OVO Arena	18 April 2022	Davina McCall	Duncan James	Jacqueline Jossa

=== Butlin's live show tour ===
Since 2023, The Masked Singer has been touring Butlin's holiday camps during selected school holidays. The show features real costumes used in the television series and each live show includes an unmasking of a famous celebrity. The show was hosted by CBBC presenters Sam & Mark. The live show returned for the 2024 season with a custom made costume for the resort, Stick Of Rock.

== See also ==
- Masked Singer franchise
