= Cash in the Attic =

British television series

- Also known as: Cash in the Celebrity Attic (2008–11)
- Presented by: Jules Hudson; Chris Kamara (2022)
- Narrated by: Natalie Casey (2022)
- Country of origin: United Kingdom
- Original language: English
- No. of series: 18 (regular); 6 (celebrity)
- No. of episodes: 586 (regular series); 126 (celebrity series)

Production
- Running time: 30 minutes (2002–2009); 45 minutes (2010–2012); 60 minutes (2022)
- Production company: Leopard Films

Original release
- Network: BBC One (2002–2012); Channel 5 (2022)
- Release: 4 November 2002 – 28 September 2022

Cash in the Attic is a British television programme that aired on BBC One from 4 November 2002 to 24 May 2012. The programme's tagline was The show that helps you find hidden treasures in your home, and then sells them for you at auction. The show was revived by Channel 5 in November 2021 for broadcast in 2022.

== Format ==
In the show, the presenter visited a family's house to find out what they need to raise money for. They then explored the house and its surroundings, finding antiques and valuing them, with the help of experts. The family then goes to auction with the aim of making their financial target. The auction never takes place on the same day as the rummage; often it can take place several weeks later.

== Presenters and experts ==
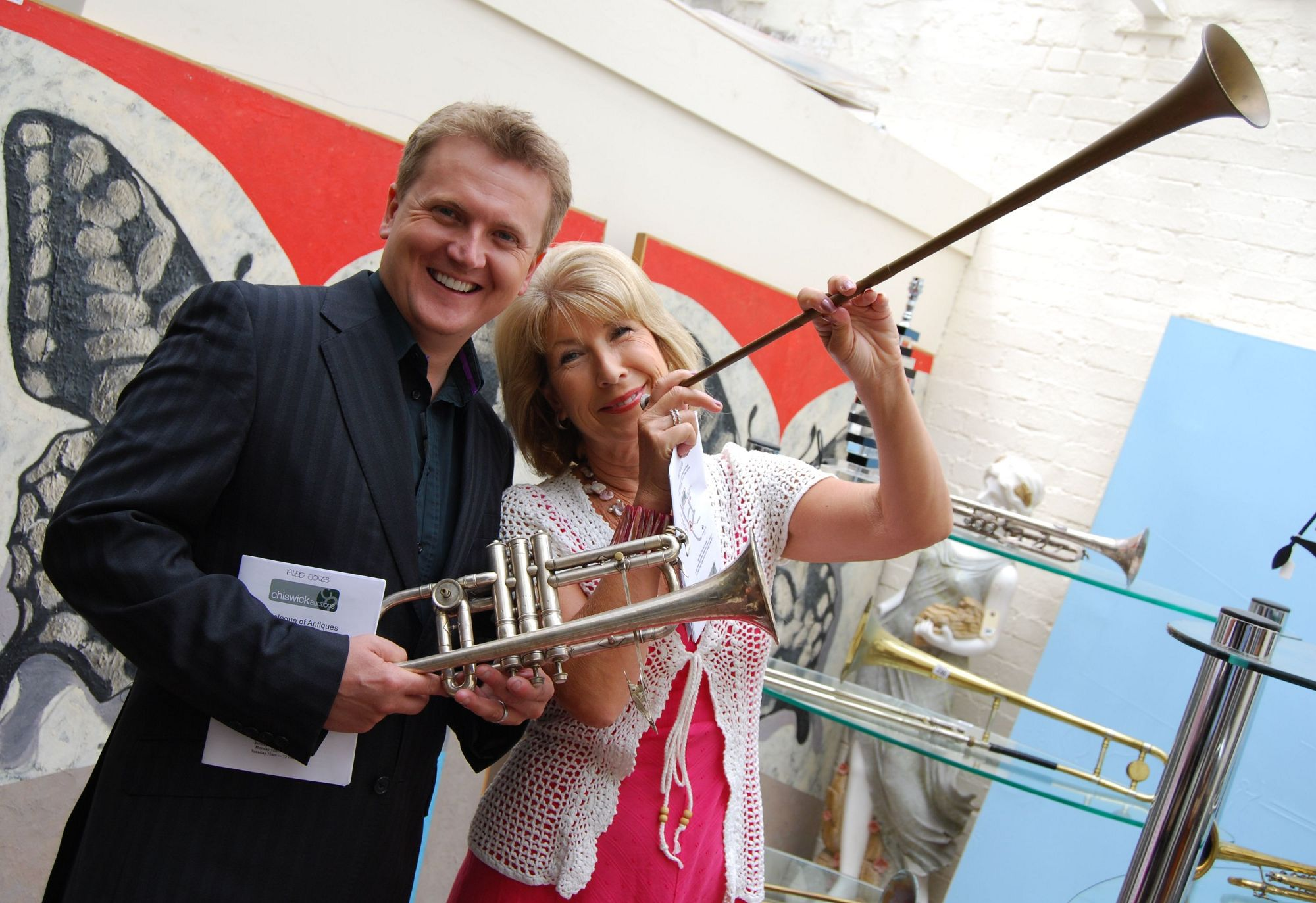
Aled Jones joined as a presenter for series 16 in 2010; pictured with Jennie Bond

During its run on the BBC, the show was hosted by presenters including Angela Rippon, Jennie Bond, Gloria Hunniford, Lorne Spicer, Ben Fogle, Chris Hollins, Aled Jones, Alistair Appleton, Angus Purden, Jules Hudson. In 2021, Hudson, already a presenter of a number of Channel 5 shows based at Cannon Hall Farm (such as Winter on the Farm), was hired to present a new series of Cash in the Attic alongside Chris Kamara, a series which will be shown on Channel 5 on weekdays from 1 August 2022. The antiques experts include Paul Hayes, Jessica Wall, David Fergus, Jessica Forrester and Kayleigh Davies.

The antiques experts for the previous BBC series included Paul Hayes, Jonty Hearnden, John Cameron and James Rylands.

== Transmissions ==
=== BBC ===
==== Regular series ====
Series	Start date	End date	Episodes
1	4 November 2002	9 December 2002	25
2	14 April 2003	21 May 2003	25

==== Celebrity series ====
Series	Start date	End date	Episodes
1	7 July 2008	8 August 2008	21
2	19 January 2009	20 February 2009	25
3	4 May 2009	29 May 2009	20
4	8 February 2010	5 March 2010	20
5	9 August 2010	4 January 2011	17
6	5 January 2011	24 May 2011	23

=== Channel 5 ===
Series	Start date	End date	Episodes
1	1 August 2022	28 September 2022	40
