= Ugo Monye =

English rugby union player

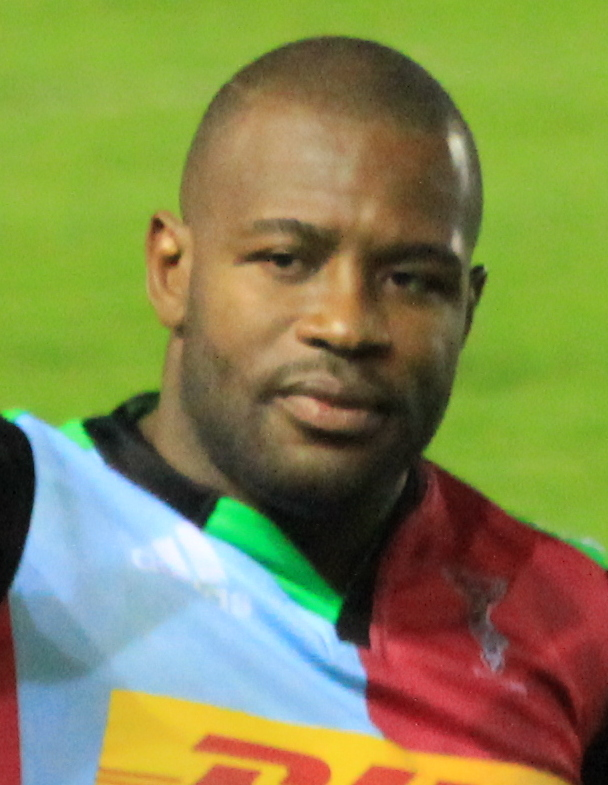
- Monye in May 2015
- Born: Ugochukwu Chiedozie Monye; 13 April 1983 (age 43) Islington, London, England
- Height: 1.88 m (6 ft 2 in)
- Weight: 92 kg (14 st 7 lb)
- School: Lord Wandsworth College

Rugby union career
- Position: Wing / Centre / Fullback
Youth career
- Harlequins
Senior career
Years	Team	Apps	(Points)
2002–2015	Harlequins	241	(435)
- Correct as of 7 March 2015
International career
Years	Team	Apps	(Points)
2008–2012	England	14	(10)
2009	British & Irish Lions	2	(5)
2006–2015	England Saxons		
- Correct as of 10 November 2012
National sevens team
Years	Team		Comps
2002–2005	England		

Ugochukwu Chiedozie Monye (born 13 April 1983) is an English former rugby union player who is now a sports pundit. Monye played 14 times for England, 241 times for his only club Harlequins and twice for the British & Irish Lions on their 2009 tour to South Africa. Monye won both the second division and then the Premiership title with Harlequins, as well as winning the European Rugby Challenge Cup in 2011.

== Career ==
=== Youth career ===
Monye was born in Islington, London, on 13 April 1983 and attended Lord Wandsworth College. As an 18-year-old Monye competed at the English Schools' Athletics Championships in the 100 metres, finishing fifth in his heat in a time of 11.10 seconds. He is friends with Olympians Mark Lewis-Francis and Tyrone Edgar who also competed in the English Schools' Championship.

Monye played for Hampshire RFC U17s and U20s.

=== Breakthrough and sevens ===
Harlequins offered him a professional contract and within 12 months he was a member of the England RFU Sevens team that won the Hong Kong Sevens. Monye was a key member of the Sevens squad throughout the 2002–03 and 2003–04 IRB World Sevens Series, and was part of the team that competed in the 2005 Rugby World Cup Sevens in Hong Kong. He was also part of the England RFU Saxons sides that won the Churchill Cup in 2005 and 2008. He first played for Harlequins in a friendly against Glasgow Warriors RFC in August 2002, beginning the following season with five tries in two matches, including a hat trick against Rotherham Titans at Millmoor.

Monye scored five tries against Exeter Chiefs in Harlequins' 70–5 victory at Twickenham Stoop as the side returned to the Guinness Premiership after a season in National One during which Monye scored 16 tries. By the 2009–10 season, he had run in 47 tries in 105 games for the club.

=== International debut ===
Monye made his England debut in England's 39–13 victory over the Pacific Islanders at Twickenham in 2008 and started the rest of the autumn internationals against Australia, South Africa and New Zealand. He scored his first try for England against Scotland at Twickenham in the Six Nations on 21 March 2009.

Selected for the 2009 Lions' tour of South Africa, Monye started the first Test in Durban, which the Lions lost, and he was replaced by Luke Fitzgerald. Monye was recalled for the third Test and scored a 70-metre intercept try. He was the tourists' highest try scorer with five.

=== Club success ===
In September 2010, Ugo suffered a career-threatening injury and, after surgery, was sidelined for 12 weeks. This ruled him out of the England squad for the autumn test series and consequently the 2011 Six Nations tournament. He returned to play for Harlequins who he helped to win the Amlin Challenge Cup, before being named in the England training squad for the 2011 Rugby World Cup at the end of the season.

Monye started for Harlequins in their 2011–12 Premiership final victory over Leicester Tigers.

On 24 March 2015, Monye announced he was retiring at the end of the season.

=== Chair of independent advisory group on diversity ===
In April 2021, Monye was appointed chair of the Rugby Football Union's independent advisory group on diversity.

In June 2022, during an interview with The Telegraph, Monye argued that rugby union needed to tackle its "heavy drinking" and "laddish" culture in order to become fully inclusive.

=== Media work ===
Monye presents the Rugby Union Weekly podcast for the BBC with journalist Chris Jones and England scrum half Danny Care. He also presents on BT Sport. In July 2021, it was announced that Monye and Sam Quek would be the new team captains on BBC's Question of Sport quiz show.

From September 2021 Monye was a contestant on the nineteenth series of Strictly Come Dancing, paired with professional dancer Oti Mabuse. The couple finished in 11th place.

== Personal life ==
Monye is a committed Christian. He shares about his faith on episode 14 of the Alpha Course film series.

Monye's father died shortly before his appearance on BBC's Strictly Come Dancing in 2021.

On 21 October 2021 Monye announced that he and his wife had split.

In January 2025, Monye was served with a bankruptcy petition by HM Revenue and Customs (HMRC) after his company was liquidated following non-payment of £200,000 in tax and National Insurance. HMRC withdrew the petition in March 2025 as it was unable to serve papers on Monye because it could not find an up-to-date address for him.
