= Mo Gilligan =

British comedian (born 1988)

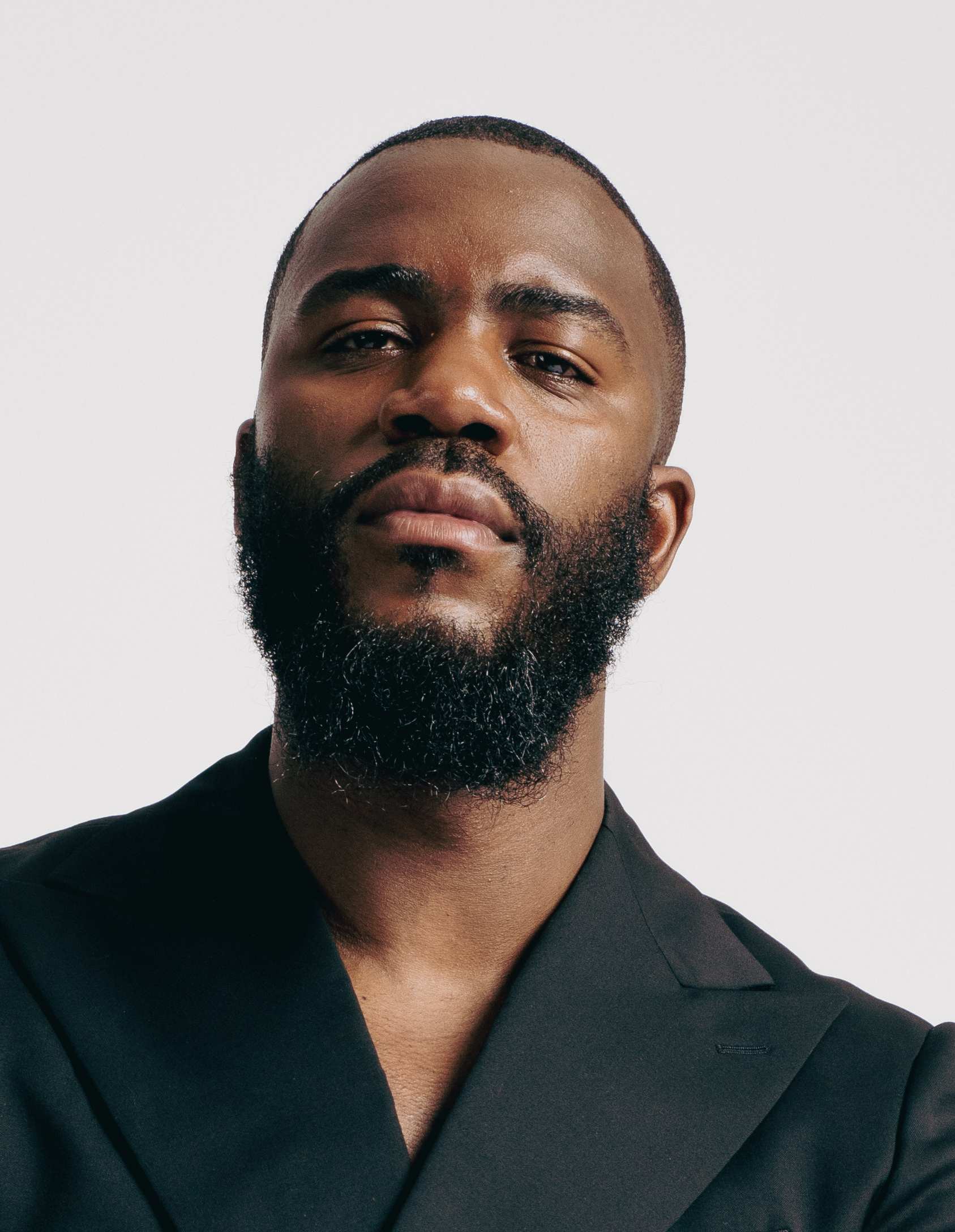
- Gilligan in 2023
- Born: Mosiah Bikila Gilligan; 19 February 1988 (age 38); Lambeth, London, England

Comedy career
- Medium: Stand-up, television
- Genres: Grime comedy; observational comedy; physical comedy; musical comedy
- Subjects: Black culture, British culture, everyday life
- Website: mogilligan.com

Mosiah Bikila Gilligan (born 19 February 1988) is a British stand-up comedian, television presenter and content creator. He is known for his observational comedy. After several years of uploading comedy clips to social media, he found a wider audience in 2017. He hosted The Lateish Show with Mo Gilligan (2019) on Channel 4. He currently co-hosts The Big Narstie Show on Channel 4, and is a judge on The Masked Singer UK since the second series in 2020, and a judge on The Masked Dancer UK since 2021. In 2022, Gilligan took a break from The Masked Dancer UK due to work conflicts, and was replaced by Peter Crouch.

== Early life and education ==
Mosiah Bikila Gilligan was born on 19 February 1988 in Lambeth, London to British parents of Jamaican and St. Lucian descent. His mother was born in Wales while his father is from Brixton. His parents separated when he was five, and he was raised by both parents while living in Camberwell, London.

Gilligan was educated at Pimlico School, (now known as Pimlico Academy), a state comprehensive school in the Pimlico area of Westminster, in London. He began his interest in comedy whilst attending a performing arts school in Pimlico.

== Career ==
Gilligan was working in retail, when he began uploading comedy videos on his social media accounts. His videos were popular and customers eventually began recognising him. His breakout moment came in 2017, when he was spotted by Canadian rapper Drake, who quoted some of Gilligan's comedy on his own Instagram account. His influences include Dave Chappelle and Chris Rock; he did his first lengthy show after watching a Chris Rock stand-up film.

From June 2018 to December 2022, Gilligan co-hosted The Big Narstie Show with rapper Big Narstie. The show was perceived as a "late night, alternative entertainment show" and featured celebrity guest interviews, sketches and studio games. Throughout its run, the show received a mixed reception from viewers and critics alike; however, the show won multiple awards including a British Academy Television Award and a Royal Television Society Award, winning the latter in 2021 for 'Best Comedy Entertainment Programme'. After five series and 33 episodes (including a Christmas special in 2018), the show was cancelled.

As a result of his success as co-presenter on The Big Narstie Show, in 2019, Gilligan began hosting his self-titled Friday night late-night chat show, titled The Lateish Show with Mo Gilligan. As with the former, the show featured celebrity guest interviews, sketches and studio games. For his work on the show, Gilligan won a British Academy Television Award in 2020 for 'Best Entertainment Performance', with the show itself winning an award in 2022 for 'Best Comedy Entertainment Programme'. In December 2023, Gilligan announced the show's Christmas special at the end of the year would be its last episode, thus ending the show after four series and 27 episodes.

Since 2020, Gilligan has served as a regular panellist on ITV1 reality competition series The Masked Singer, replacing Ken Jeong after travel restrictions in accordance with the ongoing COVID-19 pandemic meant he couldn't appear in the show's second series. He forms the show's judging panel alongside presenter Davina McCall, singer Rita Ora and broadcaster Jonathan Ross. In 2021, Gilligan served as a panellist for the show's spin-off, titled The Masked Dancer, before being replaced for its second series by former Premier League footballer Peter Crouch (however, he appeared as a temporary fifth panellist for that series' sixth episode). Appearing as a guest on the Big Fat Quiz 2023, Gilligan revealed to Jimmy Carr that he is Dyslexic. He took on a voice role as Beckett in the animated film 10 Lives (2024).

In August 2024, Gilligan announced his new podcast show 'Mo Gilligan: Beginning, Middle and End'.

== Personal life ==
Gilligan is an avid supporter of Arsenal F.C. Gilligan is engaged to his Brazilian fiancé. He is a Christian.

== See also ==
- List of British comedians
- Munya Chawawa
- Michael Dapaah
