= Oti Mabuse =

South African dancer (born 1990)

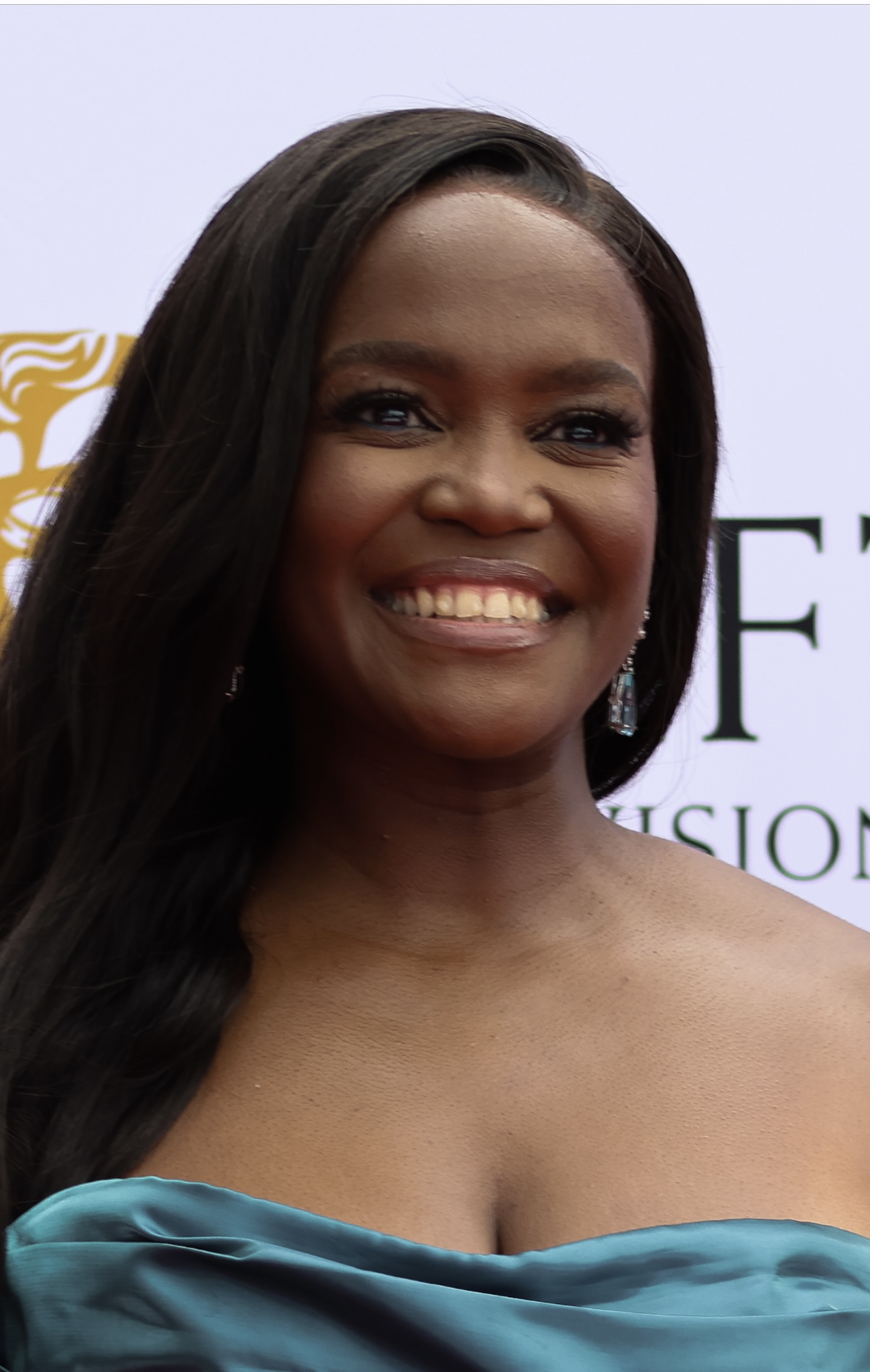
- Mabuse at the 2026 British Academy Television Awards
- Born: Otlile Mabuse; 8 August 1990 (age 36); Pretoria, South Africa
- Citizenship: South Africa; United Kingdom
- Education: Tshwane University of Technology
- Occupation: Ballroom dancer
- Notable credit: Strictly Come Dancing
- Spouse: Marius Iepure (m. 2014)
- Children: 1
- Relatives: Motsi Mabuse (sister)

Otlile "Oti" Mabuse (born 8 August 1990) is a South African professional dancer, talent show judge, presenter, and Latin dance champion currently based in the United Kingdom.

She is best known for being a professional dancer on the British television series Strictly Come Dancing between 2015 and 2021, which she won in 2019 and 2020 respectively, and its German equivalent, Let's Dance. She was a Dance Captain on The Greatest Dancer. Between 2021 and 2022, she was a panellist on The Masked Dancer, and has served as a judge on Dancing on Ice from 2022 until 2025. In 2026, Mabuse joined the judging panel for the Irish version of Dancing with the Stars.

== Early life and education ==
Mabuse was born in Pretoria, South Africa, and studied civil engineering at university before embarking on a career in professional ballroom dancing. Her elder sister, Motsi Mabuse, is also a professional ballroom dancer. Oti has participated in the German series Let's Dance as a professional dancer, after which she joined Britain's Strictly Come Dancing.

== Dancing career ==
Mabuse won the South African Latin American Championship eight times, after which she moved to Germany to broaden her dancing horizons. She has earned a number of titles in her dancing career; including:

- third place in World Cup Freestyle Latin in 2014,
- second place European Championship Latin in 2014 and
- first place in German Championship PD Freestyle Latin.

== Let's Dance ==
In 2015, Mabuse appeared as a professional dancer on the eighth season of Let's Dance, the German version of Strictly Come Dancing.

She was partnered with singer Daniel Küblböck. The couple were eliminated in week 9, finishing in sixth place.

In 2016, Mabuse returned as a professional dancer for the ninth season of Let's Dance. She was partnered with television presenter Niels Ruf. The couple were the first to be eliminated in week 2, leaving in 14th place.

=== Season 8: with celebrity partner Daniel Küblböck ===
Week No.	Dance/Song	Judges' score			Total	Result
Week No.	Dance/Song	González	M Mabuse	Llambi	Total	Result
1	Quickstep / "You're The One That I Want"	6	6	3	15	Safe
2	Rumba / "Mad World"	6	6	4	16	Safe
3	Contemporary / "Jeanny"	6	8	6	20	Safe
4	Cha-Cha-Cha / "Tragedy"	5	5	2	12	Safe
5	Waltz / "Yesterday"	6	6	2	14	Bottom two
6	Hip-Hop / "Sing"	7	7	5	19	Safe
7	Jazz & Paso Doble / "Born This Way"	8	7	4	19	Bottom two
8	Samba / "Livin' la Vida Loca"; Disco Marathon / "Ich will immer weider...dieses Fiber spür'n"	7 Awarded	7; 10	5 points	19; 29	Safe
9	Tango / "When Doves Cry"; Rock n' Roll / "Surfin' U.S.A."	6; 6	6; 7	2; 4	14; 17	Eliminated

=== Season 9: with celebrity partner Niels Ruf ===
Week No.	Dance/Song	Judges' score			Total	Result
Week No.	Dance/Song	González	Mabuse	Llambi	Total	Result
1	Viennese Waltz / "Where the Wild Roses Grow"	3	3	2	8	Bottom three
2	Jive / "Bad Boy"	2	3	1	6	Eliminated

== Strictly Come Dancing ==
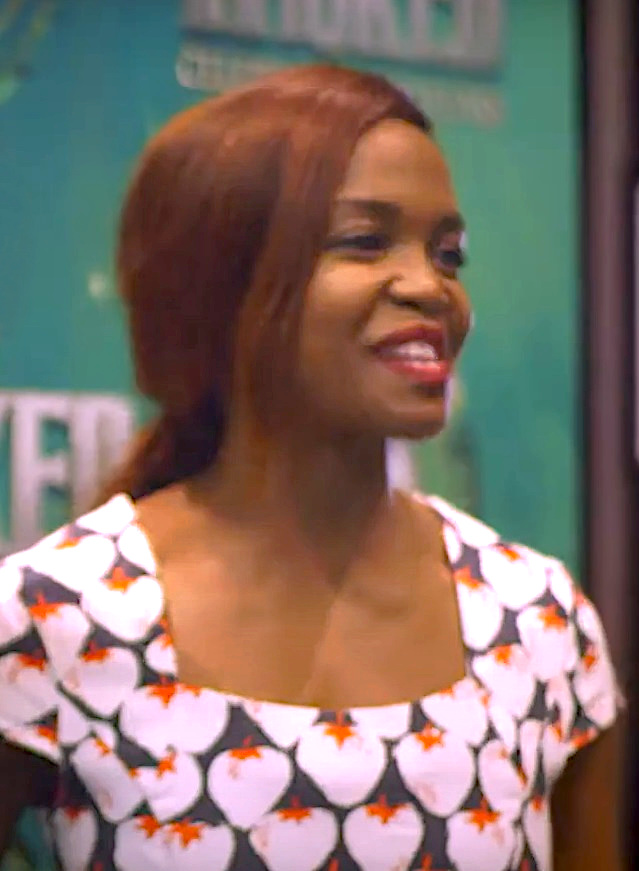
Mabuse at Wicked 10th Birthday, London, 2016

Highest and lowest scoring performances per dance

Dance	Partner	Highest	Partner	Lowest
Argentine tango	Danny Mac	38	Bill Bailey	32
American Smooth	Danny Mac; Kelvin Fletcher	39	Graeme Swann	15
Cha-Cha-Cha	Kelvin Fletcher	33	Bill Bailey; Jonnie Peacock	20
Charleston	Danny Mac	40	Graeme Swann	31
Couple's Choice	Bill Bailey (Street)	39	Ugo Monye	31
Foxtrot	Danny Mac	30	Jonnie Peacock	21
Jive	Kelvin Fletcher	39	Anthony Ogogo	21
Paso Doble	Kelvin Fletcher	37	Anthony Ogogo	19
Quickstep	Kelvin Fletcher	40	Graeme Swann	24
Rumba	Kelvin Fletcher	39	Ugo Monye	20
Salsa	Danny Mac	37	Jonnie Peacock	27
Samba	Danny Mac	40	Ugo Monye	18
Tango	Danny Mac	38	Jonnie Peacock	26
Viennese Waltz	Kelvin Fletcher	34	Danny Mac	32
Waltz	Graeme Swann	29	Anthony Ogogo	19
Showdance	Bill Bailey; Danny Mac; Kelvin Fletcher	40	-	-

In 2015, Mabuse appeared as a professional on the 13th series of Strictly Come Dancing. She was partnered with Olympic boxer Anthony Ogogo. The couple were eliminated in Week 3, finishing in 14th place. That year, she also participated in the Children in Need and Christmas specials of the show, in which she partnered with actors Jack Ashton and Tom Chambers respectively.

In 2016, Mabuse was partnered with former Hollyoaks actor Danny Mac for the show's 14th series. The couple reached the final and finished as runners-up. For the show's 15th series in 2017, she was partnered with Paralympic sprinter Jonnie Peacock, they were eliminated in Week 9 in eighth place. She was paired with England cricketer Graeme Swann for the show's 16th series, they were eliminated in Week 10 in seventh place.

In 2019, for her fifth stint on the show, she was partnered with former Emmerdale actor Kelvin Fletcher, who replaced her originally announced partner, Made in Chelsea star Jamie Laing, who had to withdraw from the show after sustaining a foot injury when dancing on the launch show. They went on to become the winners of the series. Laing was confirmed as a contestant for the 18th series the following year, but was re-partnered with fellow professional Karen Hauer, in which Mabuse was partnered with comedian and actor, Bill Bailey, reaching the final and became series winners, with Mabuse becoming the second pro to win the show twice (the other being Aliona Vilani who won series 9 and series 13) and the only pro to win twice in succession.

On 18 April 2021, two weeks after being unveiled as part of 19th series of the show, Mabuse revealed that this would most likely be her last. On 22 February 2022, Mabuse confirmed she was leaving the show after seven years.

Series	Partner	Place	Average Score
13	Anthony Ogogo	14th	19.7
14	Danny Mac	2nd	36.6
15	Jonnie Peacock	8th	25.8
16	Graeme Swann	7th	26.0
17	Kelvin Fletcher	1st	36.4
18	Bill Bailey	1st	34.6
19	Ugo Monye	11th	23.5

=== Series 13: with celebrity partner Anthony Ogogo ===
Week No.	Dance/Song	Judges' score				Total	Result
Week No.	Dance/Song	Craig Revel; Horwood	Darcey; Bussell	Len; Goodman	Bruno; Tonioli	Total	Result
1	Jive / "Wake Me Up Before You Go-Go"	4	5	6	6	21	No Elimination
2	Waltz / "If You Don't Know Me by Now"	4	5	5	5	19	Safe
3	Paso Doble / "Eye of the Tiger"	4	6	5	4	19	Eliminated

=== Series 14: with celebrity partner Danny Mac ===
Week No.	Dance/Song	Judges' score				Total	Result
Week No.	Dance/Song	Craig Revel; Horwood	Darcey; Bussell	Len; Goodman	Bruno; Tonioli	Total	Result
1	Cha-Cha-Cha / "Cake by the Ocean"	8	8	7	8	31	No Elimination
2	Viennese Waltz / "Never Tear Us Apart"	8	8	8	8	32	Safe
3	Paso Doble / "El Sambrero Blanco"	9	9	9	9	36	Safe
4	Quickstep / "I Won't Dance"	9	9	9	9	36	Safe
5	Rumba / "How Will I Know"	8	9	9	9	35	Safe
6	Foxtrot / "Take Me to Church"	7	8	7	8	30	Safe
7	Jive / "Long Tall Sally"	9	10	9	10	38	Safe
8	Argentine Tango / "I Heard it Through the Grapevine"	9	9	10	10	38	Safe
9	Charleston / "Puttin' On the Ritz"	10	10	10	10	40	Safe
10	Samba / "Magalenha"; Cha-cha-cha Challenge / "I Like It Like That"	10; Awarded	10; 5	10 extra	10 points	40; 45	Safe
11	Tango / "One Night Only"	9	10	9	10	38	Safe
12	Salsa / "Vivir Mi Vida"; American Smooth / "Misty Blue"	9; 10	9; 9	9; 10	10; 10	37; 39	Bottom two
13	Quickstep / "I Won't Dance"; Showdance / "Set Fire to the Rain"; Samba / "Magalenha"	9; 10; 10	9; 10; 10	9; 10; 10	9; 10; 10	36; 40; 40	Runner-up

=== Series 15: with celebrity partner Jonnie Peacock ===
Week No.	Dance/Song	Judges' score				Total	Result
Week No.	Dance/Song	Revel Horwood	Bussell	Ballas	Tonioli	Total	Result
1	Waltz / "When I Need You"	4	5	5	6	20	No Elimination
2	Jive / "Johnny B. Goode"	6	7	8	8	29	Safe
3	Paso Doble / "The Raider's March"	6	6	7	7	26	Safe
4	American Smooth / "Cry Me a River"	7	8	8	8	31	Safe
5	Quickstep / "Part-Time Lover"	7	8	9	–^{#}	24	Safe
6	Cha-Cha-Cha / "Troublemaker"	4	6	5	5	20	Safe
7	Salsa / "Turn Me On"	6	7	7	7	27	Safe
8	Foxtrot / "Someone like You"	4	5	6	6	21	Bottom two
9	Tango / "Sweet Dreams (Are Made Of This)"	6	7	6	7	26	Eliminated

^{#} Bruno Tonioli was absent and there was no guest judge.

=== Series 16: with celebrity partner Graeme Swann ===
Week No.	Dance/Song	Judges' score				Total	Result
Week No.	Dance/Song	Craig Revel; Horwood	Darcey; Bussell	Shirley; Ballas	Bruno; Tonioli	Total	Result
1	Samba / "Soul Limbo"	5	6	6	5	22	No Elimination
2	American Smooth / "Try a Little Tenderness"	3	5	3	4	15	Safe
3	Charleston / "Spider-Man"	7	8	8	8	31	Safe
4	Jive / "Don't Stop Me Now"	5	7	7	7	26	Safe
5	Tango / "Roxanne"	6	7	8	8^{#}	29	Safe
6	Cha-Cha-Cha / "Thriller"	4	5	6	6	21	Bottom two
7	Waltz / "The Last Waltz"	6	7	8	8	29	Safe
8	Salsa / "Follow the Leader"	7	8	8	8	31	Bottom two
9	Jazz / "The Trolley Song"	7	8	8	9	32	Bottom two
10	Quickstep / "Sing, Sing, Sing (With a Swing)"; Lindy Hop-a-thon / "Do Your Thing"	6 Awarded	6; 2	6 Extra	6 Points	24; 26	Eliminated

^{#} Bruno Tonioli was absent; Alfonso Ribeiro was guest judge.

=== Series 17: with celebrity partner Kelvin Fletcher ===
Mabuse was originally paired with Jamie Laing, however he had to pull out due to a foot injury whilst the recording of the launch show. Laing was replaced with Kelvin Fletcher, just before the start of the live shows.

Week No.	Dance/Song	Judges' scores					Result
Week No.	Dance/Song	Horwood	Mabuse	Ballas	Tonioli	Total	Result
1	Samba / "La Vida Es Un Carnaval"	8	8	8	8	32	No Elimination
2	Waltz / "What the World Needs Now is Love"	7	7	7	7	28	Safe
3	Charleston / "Trip a Little Light Fantastic"	9	9	10	10	38	Safe
4	Rumba / "Ain't No Sunshine"	9	9	9	9	36	Safe
5	Cha-Cha-Cha / "Get Stupid"	8	8	8	9	33	Safe
6	Tango / "Bad Guy"	9	9	9	9	36	Safe
7	Viennese Waltz / "Say Something"	8	9	8	9	34	Safe
8	Salsa / "Let's Hear It for the Boy"	8	9	9	9	35	Safe
9	Jive / "Jailhouse Rock"	9	10	10	10	39	Safe
10	Street / "Do I Love You (Indeed I Do)"	8	10	10	10	38	Safe
11	American Smooth / "Gaston"	9	10	10	10	39	Safe
12	Quickstep / "The Lady Is a Tramp"; Paso Doble / "Seven Nation Army"	10; 9	10; 10	10; 9	10; 9	40; 37	Safe
13	Rumba / "Ain't No Sunshine"; Showdance / "Shout"; Samba / "La Vida Es Un Carnaval"	9; 10; 9	10; 10; 10	10; 10; 10	10; 10; 10	39; 40; 39	Winners

^{#} Bruno Tonioli was absent; Alfonso Ribeiro was guest judge.

=== Series 18: with celebrity partner Bill Bailey ===
Week No.	Dance/Song	Judges' score			Total	Result
Week No.	Dance/Song	Revel Horwood	Ballas	Mabuse	Total	Result
1	Cha Cha Cha / "Pata Pata"	3	6	6	15	No Elimination
2	Quickstep / "Talk to the Animals"	8	8	8	24	Safe
3	Paso Doble / "The Good, the Bad and the Ugly"	8	9	9	26	Safe
4	Street / "Rapper's Delight"	8	10	9^{#}	27	Safe
5	American Smooth / "I've Got You Under My Skin"	8	9	8^{#}	25	Safe
6	Jive / "One Way or Another"	8	8	8	24	Safe
7	Argentine Tango / "The Phantom of the Opera"	8	8	8	24	Safe
8	Charleston / "Won't You Come Home Bill Bailey"; Tango / "Enter Sandman"	8; 8	8; 7	9; 8	25; 23	Safe
9	Quickstep / "Talk to the Animals"; Showdance / "The Show Must Go On"; Street / "Rapper's Delight"	9; 10; 9	10; 10; 10	10; 10; 10	29; 30; 29	Winners

^{#} Motsi Mabuse was absent; Anton du Beke was guest judge.

=== Series 19: with celebrity partner Ugo Monye ===
Week No.	Dance/Song	Judges' score				Total	Result
Week No.	Dance/Song	Revel Horwood	Mabuse	Ballas	Du Beke	Total	Result
1	Samba / "Iko Iko (My Bestie)"	3	5	5	5	18	No Elimination
2	Quickstep / "Bring Me Sunshine"	5	7	7	6	25	Safe
3	Couple's Choice / "You're Welcome"	7	8	8	8	31	Safe
4	Viennese Waltz / "I've Been Loving You Too Long"	-	-	-	-	-	Given bye
5	Rumba / "Leave the Door Open"	3	6	5	6	20	Eliminated

== Dance tours and other professional engagements ==
In 2017, Mabuse took part in the national Strictly Come Dancing - The Live Tour with her celebrity partner Danny Mac. They were voted the winners of more individual shows than any other couple by the audience. In August 2017, Mabuse and Ian Waite announced a 60-date 2018 UK tour An Audience With. She was also a contestant on an episode of Tipping Point: Lucky Stars. In October 2018, Mabuse announced she would be teaching at Donahey's Dancing with the Stars Weekends in 2019.

In 2019, Mabuse became a dance captain on The Greatest Dancer, alongside Cheryl, Matthew Morrison and later Todrick Hall. The same year, she was a contestant on Celebrity MasterChef and was nominated for BroadwayWorld UK Awards - Best Choreography of a New Production of a Play or Musical for her work Kiss Me, Kate at the Watermill Theatre. In 2020, Mabuse became the new host of Boogie Beebies. She was also a contestant on that year's Christmas Special of Michael McIntyre's The Wheel.

In March 2021, it was announced that Mabuse would be a panelist on a brand new ITV show, The Masked Dancer UK, a spin-off of The Masked Singer UK, replacing Rita Ora's position in the original show. In December 2021, it was confirmed that Mabuse would replace John Barrowman on the judging panel of Dancing on Ice.

From April 2022, Mabuse worked as the choreographer of the UK and Ireland production of The Cher Show, which toured the country.

In November 2024, Mabuse appeared as a contestant on the twenty-fourth series of I'm a Celebrity...Get Me Out of Here!. She was the 9th celebrity to leave the camp, finishing at 4th place, just missing out on the final 3.

In September 2025, Mabuse announced she was to appear at "Dancing With The Stars Weekends" 2026.

== Personal life ==
In 2014, Mabuse married Romanian dancer Marius Iepure, whom she met in Germany. As of 2019 they were living in London, after moving there from Germany in 2015. On Christmas Day 2023, Mabuse and Iepure announced the arrival of their first child, a daughter.

In 2025, Mabuse officially became a British citizen, while retaining her South African citizenship.

== Filmography ==
Year	Title	Role	Notes	Ref
2015–2016	Let's Dance	Herself	Professional dancer (Seasons 8–9)	
2015–2021	Strictly Come Dancing	Herself	Professional dancer (Series 13–19)	
2019–2020	The Greatest Dancer	Herself	Judge	
2019–2021	Lorraine	Herself	7 episodes	
2019–2020	This Morning	Herself	4 episodes	
2019	Celebrity MasterChef	Herself	Contestant	
2020	Boogie Beebies	Herself	Host (Series 3)	
2020–2021	Morning Live	Herself	Presenter (10 episodes)	
2020	Michael McIntyre's The Wheel	Herself	Contestant (Christmas Special)	
2021	Ant & Dec's Saturday Night Takeaway	Herself	3 episodes	
2021–2022	The Masked Dancer UK	Herself	Panelist	
2021	RuPaul's Drag Race UK: "Dragoton"	Herself	Choreographer, guest judge	
2022–2025	Dancing on Ice	Herself	Judge	
2022	Romeo & Duet	Herself	Presenter	
2022	Oti Mabuse: My South Africa	Herself	BBC One documentary	
2022	Olivier Awards	Guest Presenter	2022 Ceremony	
2022	The Big Narstie Show	Guest	Series 5 Episode 1	
2022	Celebrity Catchphrase Christmas Special	Herself	Contestant	
2022	On Christmas Night	Presenter	Story of the first Christmas from the Gospel according to St Luke	
2023	DNA Journey	Herself	With Motsi Mabuse	
2023	Oti Mabuse's Breakfast Show	Presenter		
2023	Big Brother: Late & Live	Herself	Celebrity Houseguest (Week 3)	
2024	Celebrity Big Brother: Late & Live	Herself	Celebrity Houseguest (Week 1)	
2024	The Great Celebrity Bake Off for Stand Up To Cancer	Herself / contestant	One episode	
2024	I'm a Celebrity...Get Me Out of Here!	Herself	Contestant; series 24	
2025-Present	Loose Women	Herself	Panellist	
2025	You Bet!	Herself	Contestant	
2025	Celebrity Yorkshire Auction House	Herself	One Episode	
2026	Oti and Richard's South African Odyssey	Herself	With Richard Coles	
2026-Present	Dancing With The Stars	Herself	Head Judge	

== Bibliography ==
- Oti Mabuse, Dance with Oti, Walker Books, London, 27 May 2021. ISBN 9781406399967.
- Oti Mabuse, Dance with Oti: the lion samba, Walker Books, London, 7 July 2022. ISBN 9781529500783.
- Oti Mabuse, Slow Burn, Simon & Schuster UK, 12 February 2026. ISBN 9781398540491.
