= The Masked Singer (British TV series) series 7 =

The Masked Singer
- Series 7
- Starring: Mo Gilligan; Maya Jama; Davina McCall; Jonathan Ross
- Hosted by: Joel Dommett
- Winner: Keisha Buchanan as "Moth"
- Runner-up: Ben Shephard as "Conkers"
- No. of episodes: 8

Release
- Original network: ITV
- Original release: 3 January – 14 February 2026

Series chronology
- ← Previous; Series 6

The seventh series of the British version of The Masked Singer premiered on ITV on 3 January 2026, following a Christmas special episode on 26 December 2025, and concluded on 14 February 2026. Joel Dommett returned as the show's presenter, whilst Mo Gilligan, Davina McCall, Maya Jama and Jonathan Ross returned as panellists. The series is the second in another two-year commissioning by ITV. The series was accompanied by companion show The Masked Singer: Unmasked hosted by Harriet Rose on ITVX. The series was won by singer Keisha Buchanan as "Moth", with television presenter Ben Shephard finishing second as "Conkers", and singer/actress Mica Paris placing third as "Toastie".

== Production ==
The commissioning of the seventh series was announced along with the previous series by ITV in October 2024, as part of a further two-year contract. Filming for the series took place in October 2025 at Bovingdon Studios in Hertfordshire, with the public being invited to apply for tickets to be in the audience. The series began airing on 3 January 2026, following the show's Christmas special episode that aired on 26 December 2025. The first trailer for the series aired on 7 December 2025, during the final of the twenty-fifth series of I'm a Celebrity...Get Me Out of Here!. It featured a preview of the costume masks for the series, followed by host Joel Dommett who removed a beanie hat before teasing "the most unmaskings ever".

It was also confirmed that this series would feature special "Masked Bands" during the course of the series. Two exclusive masks, "Goldfish" and "Emperor Penguin", fronted their own bands "No Trout" and "Antarctic Funkeys" in the first and second episodes respectively. An additional mask, "Mole Dommett", appeared in the fifth episode to provide extra clues for the panel; "Mole Dommett" was revealed as Olly Murs in the following episode.

== Panellists and host ==
Series 7 panellists and host

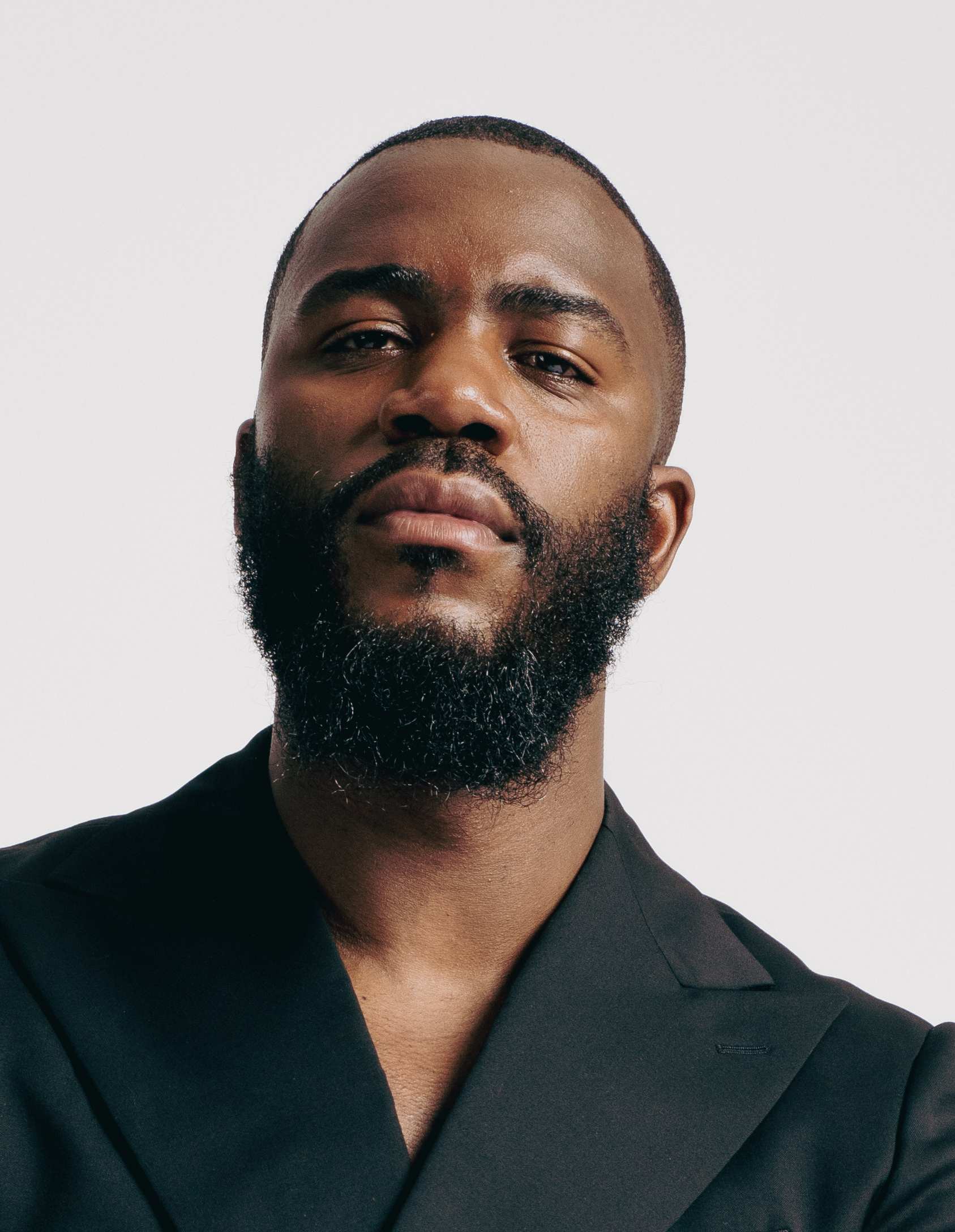
Mo Gilligan

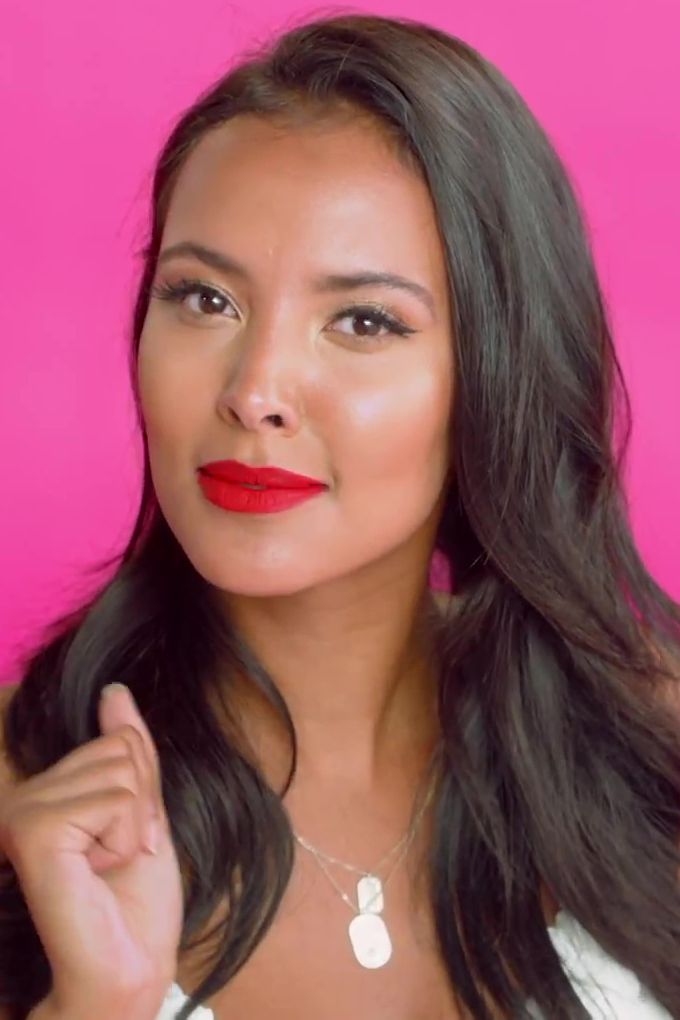
Maya Jama

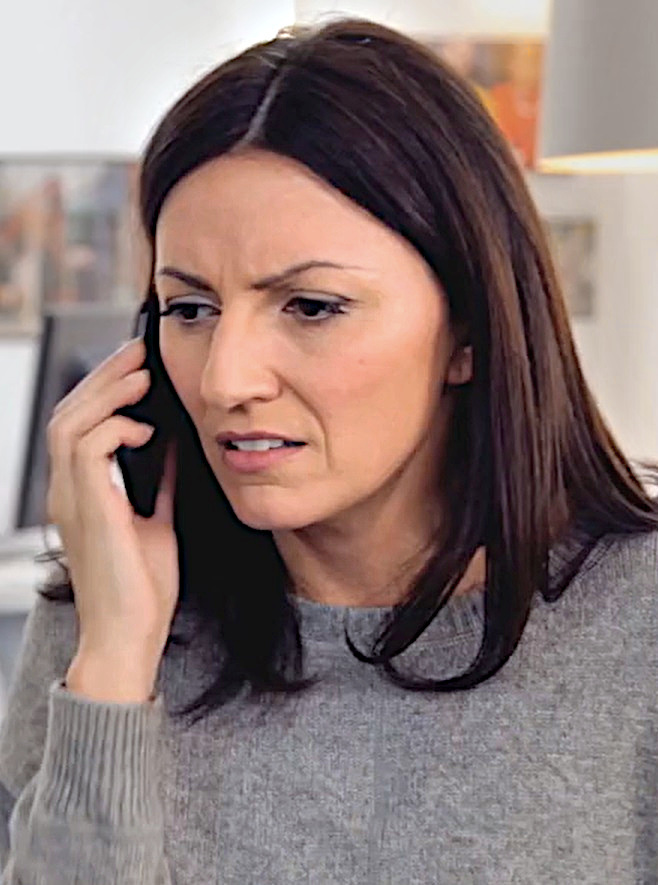
Davina McCall

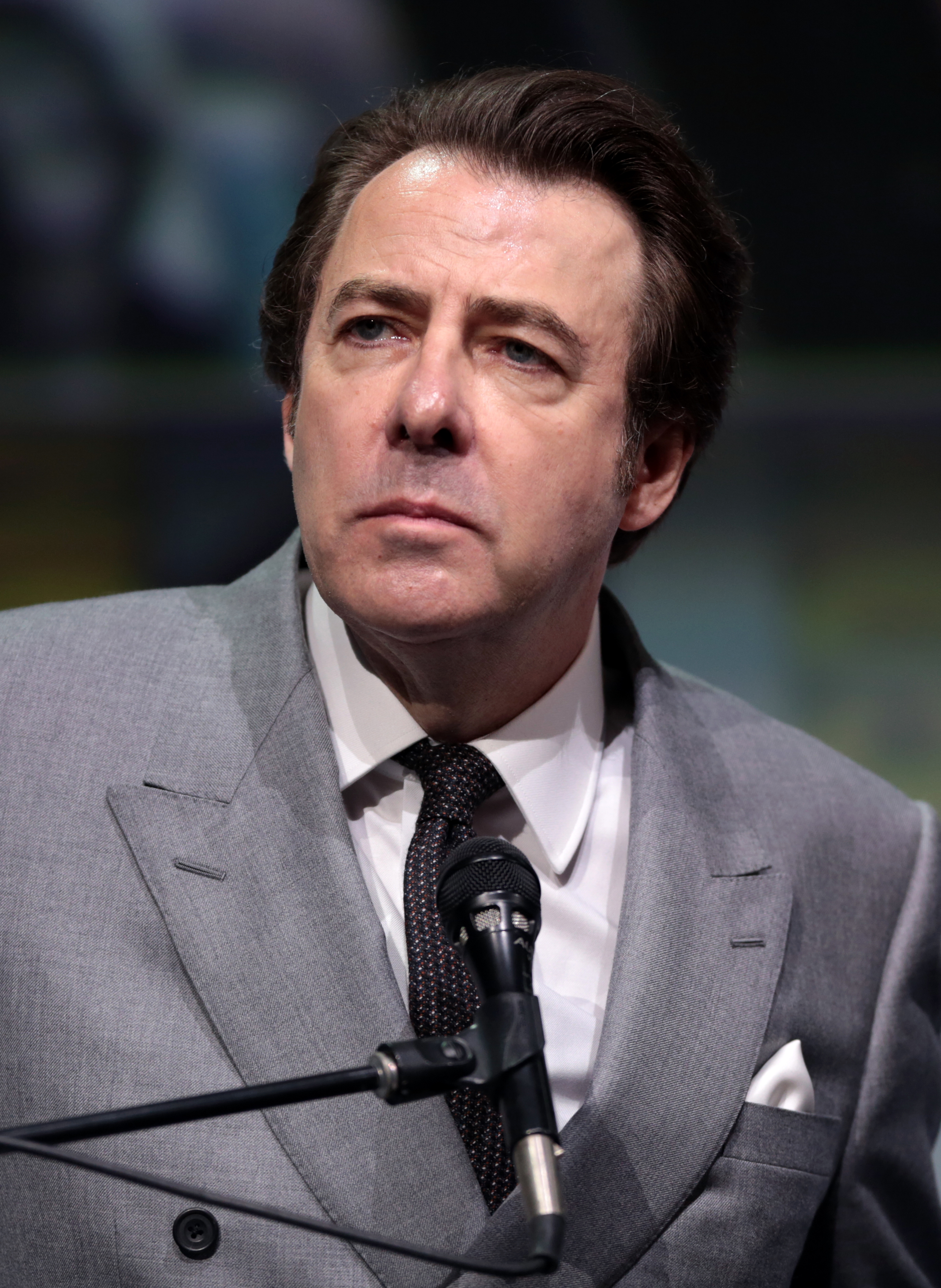
Jonathan Ross

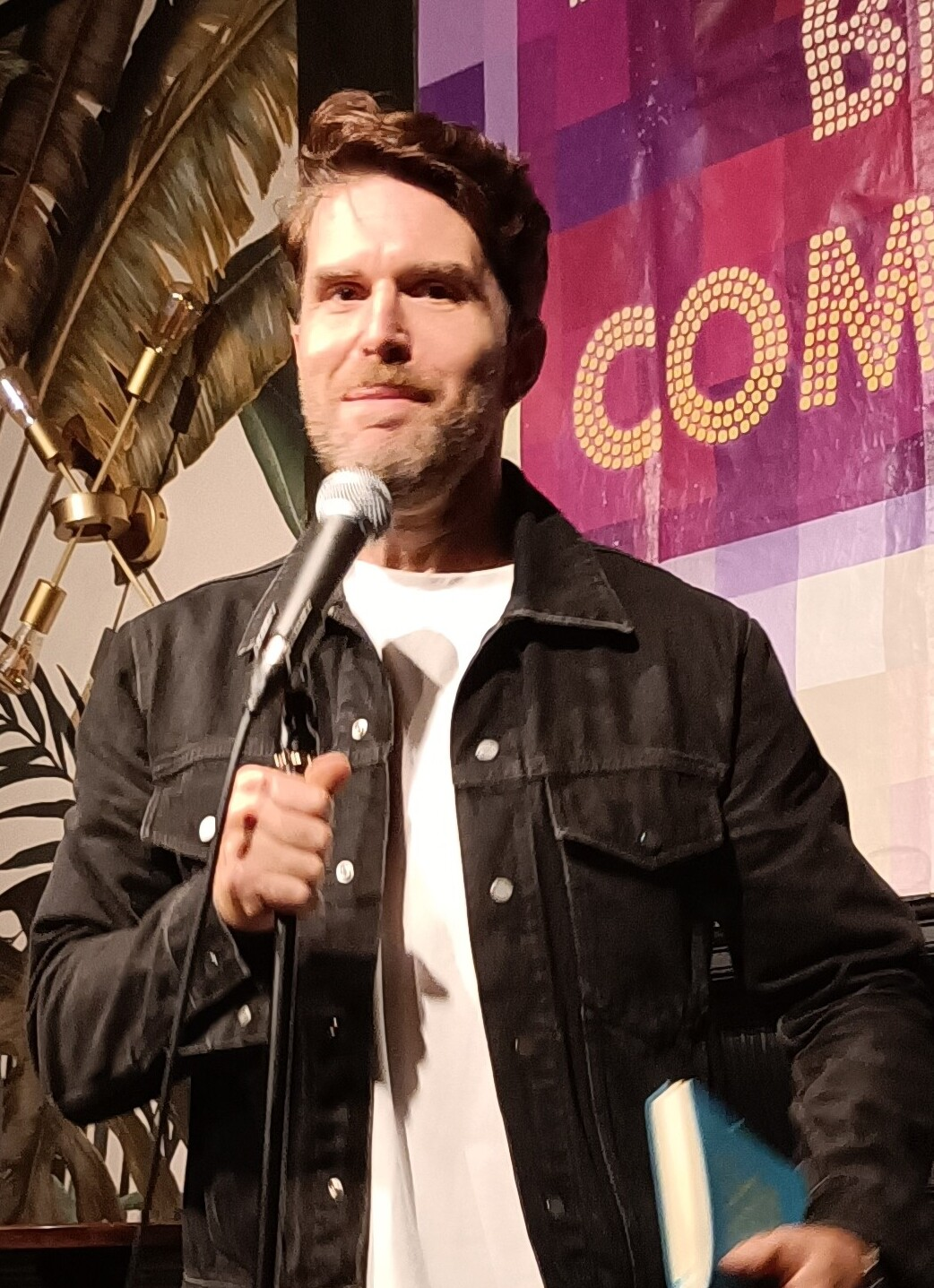
Joel Dommett

Prior to the series, it was announced that Joel Dommett would return as the show's presenter, with Jonathan Ross, Davina McCall, Mo Gilligan and Maya Jama all returning to the panel.

Anne-Marie and Matt Lucas served as guest panellists in the first and second episodes after being unmasked as "Goldfish" and "Emperor Penguin" respectively. Freddie Flintoff served as a guest panellist in the third episode. Ben Shephard, who would later be revealed as "Conkers" in the final, served as a guest panellist in the fourth episode. Perrie Edwards served as a guest panellist in the fifth episode. Olly Murs served as a guest panellist in the sixth episode after being unmasked as "Mole Dommett". Katherine Ryan, who appeared in the fourth series as "Pigeon", served as a guest panellist in the semi-final. Samantha Barks, who won the previous series as "Pufferfish", served as a guest panellist in the final.

== Contestants ==
The fifteen costume masks, including the three exclusive masks, were revealed prior to the show's airing. Red Panda was edited out of the first episode due to their song choice being deemed inappropriate following the 2026 Crans-Montana bar fire in Switzerland.

Stage name	Celebrity	Occupation	Episodes							
Stage name	Celebrity	Occupation	1	2	3	4	5	6	7	8
Moth	Keisha Buchanan	Singer	SAFE			SAFE	SAFE	SAFE	SAFE	WINNER
Conkers	Ben Shephard	TV presenter		SAFE	SAFE	(Note: Shephard served as a guest panellist in this episode.)	SAFE	SAFE	SAFE	RUNNER-UP
Toastie	Mica Paris	Singer/actress		SAFE	SAFE		SAFE	SAFE	SAFE	THIRD
Can of Worms	Marvin Humes	Singer/TV presenter	SAFE			SAFE	SAFE	SAFE	OUT	
Sloth	Ben Fogle	Broadcaster	SAFE			RISK	SAFE	SAFE	OUT	
Red Panda	Harry Hill	Comedian	SAFE			SAFE	RISK	OUT		
Arctic Fox	Anton Du Beke	Dancer/TV judge		SAFE	SAFE		OUT			
Monkey Business	Kate Nash	Singer/actress		SAFE	RISK		OUT			
Gargoyle	Marcella Detroit	Singer	RISK			OUT				
Yak	John Lydon	Singer		RISK	OUT					
Teabag	Professor Green	Rapper		OUT						
Disc Jockey	Alex Jones	TV presenter	OUT							

The masked singer was safe from elimination.
The masked singer was in the bottom two, but was not eliminated.
The masked singer was eliminated from the competition and unmasked upon their elimination.
The masked singer did not perform.
The masked singer won the competition.
The masked singer finished second.
The masked singer finished third.
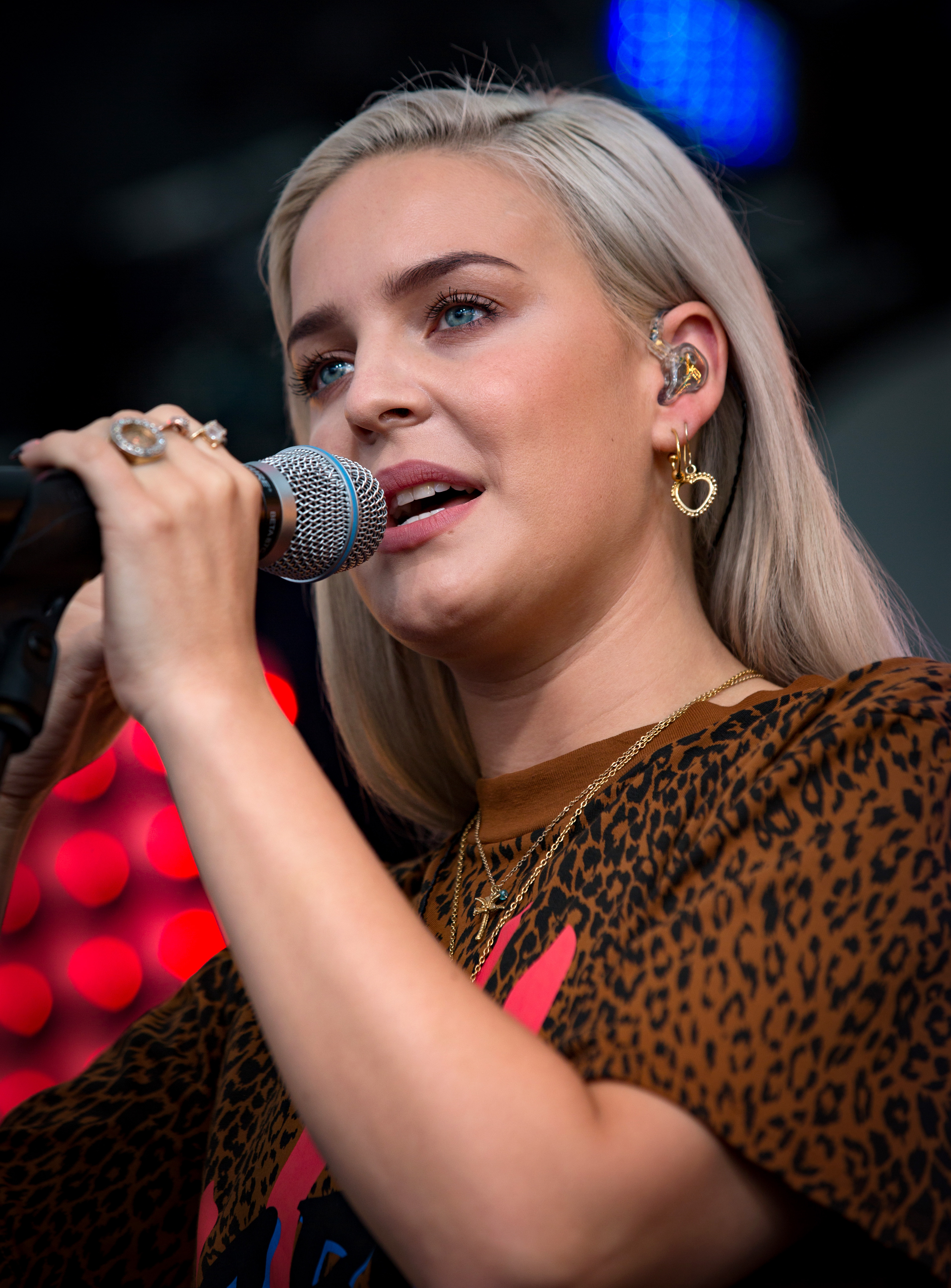
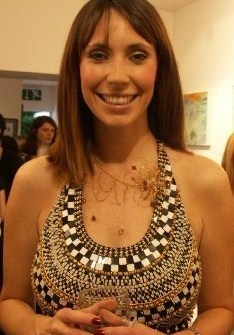
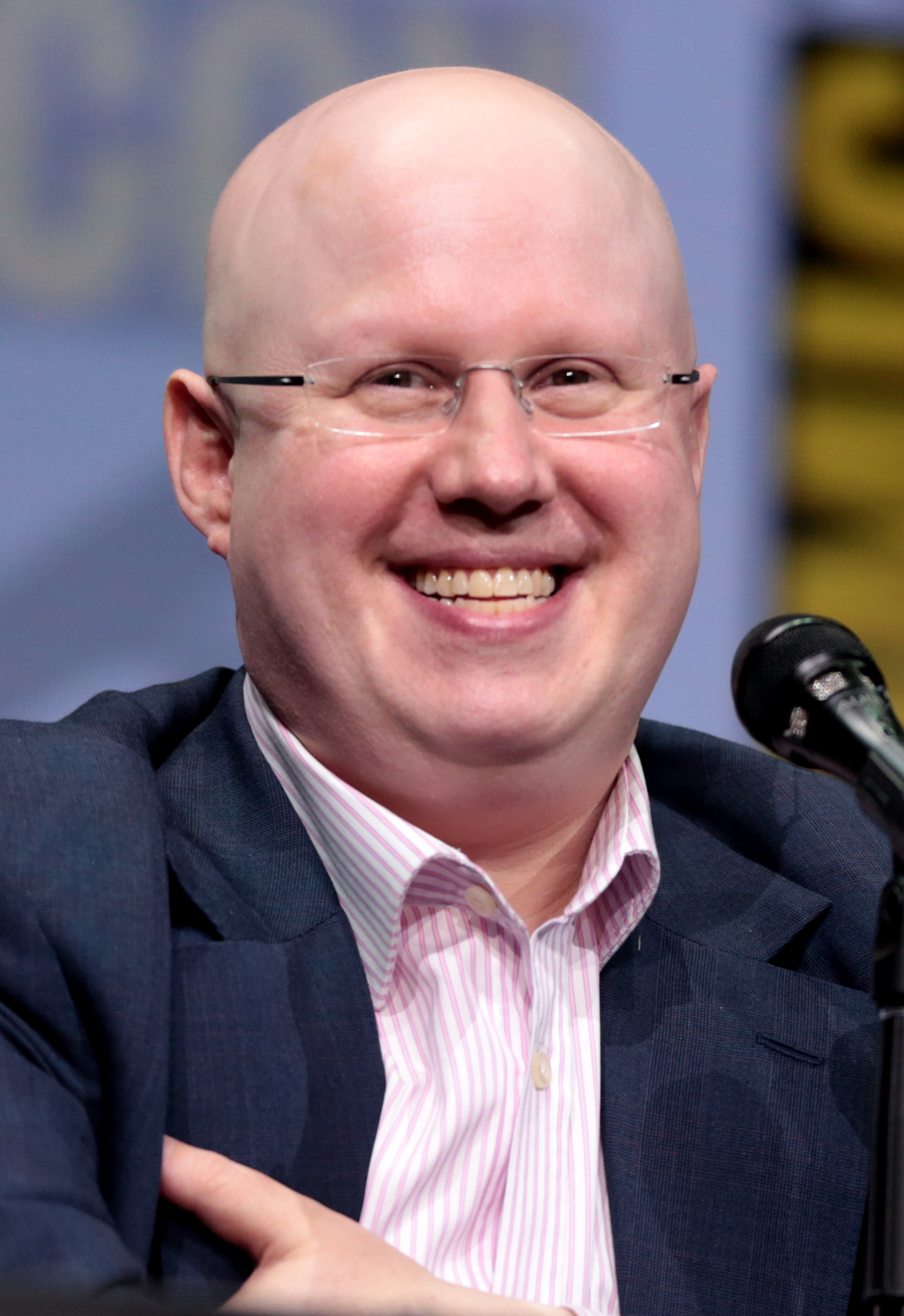
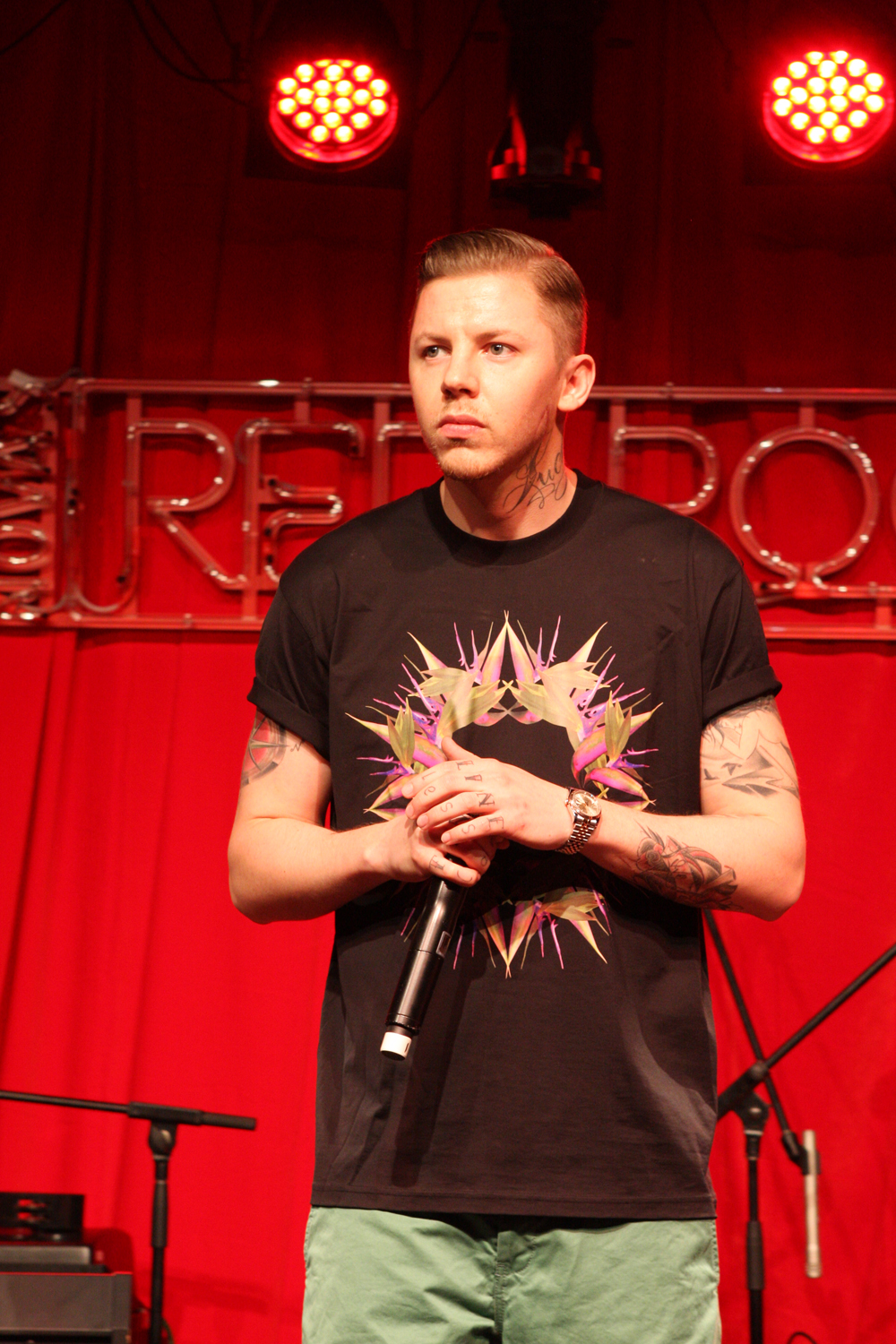
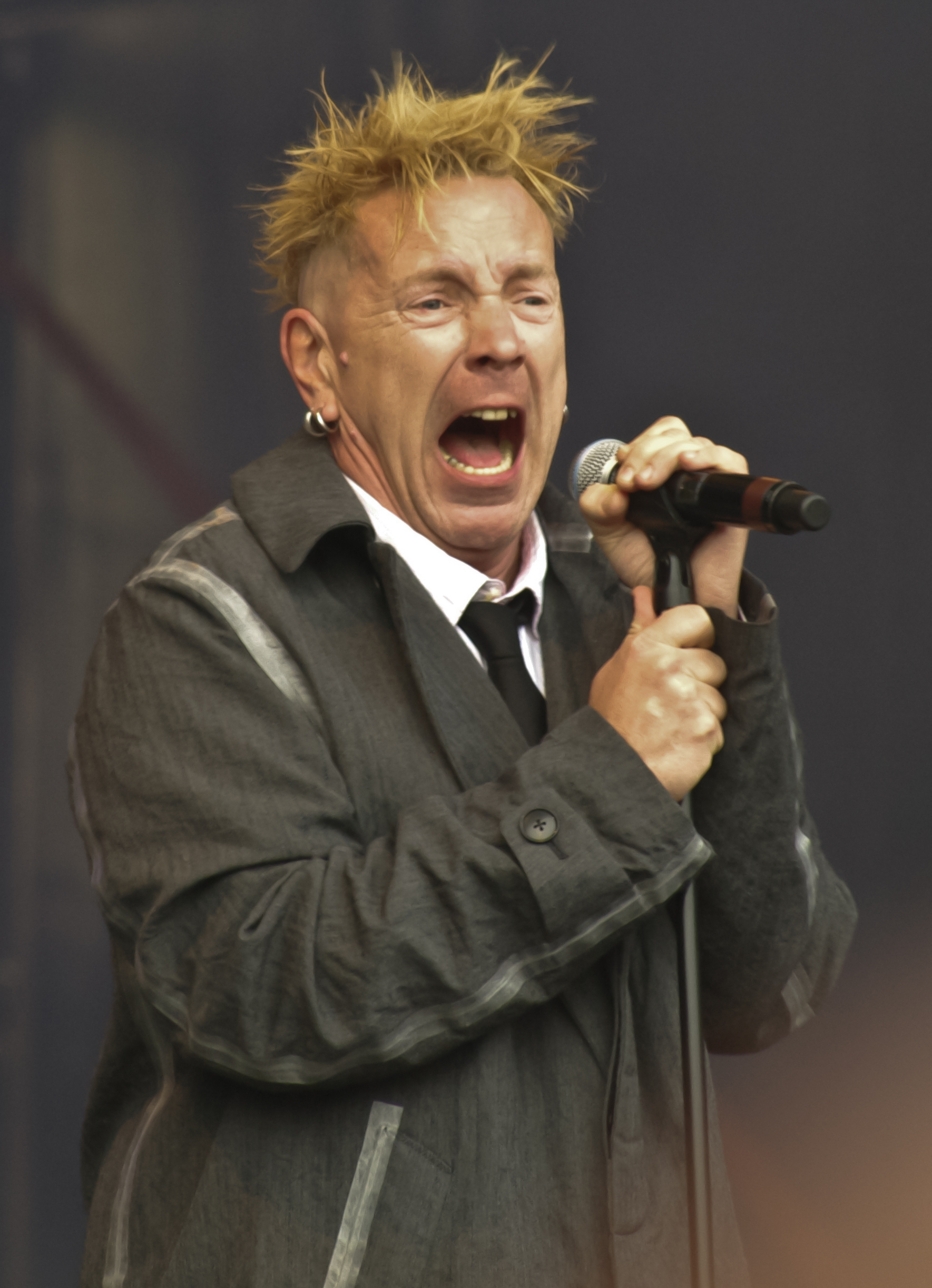
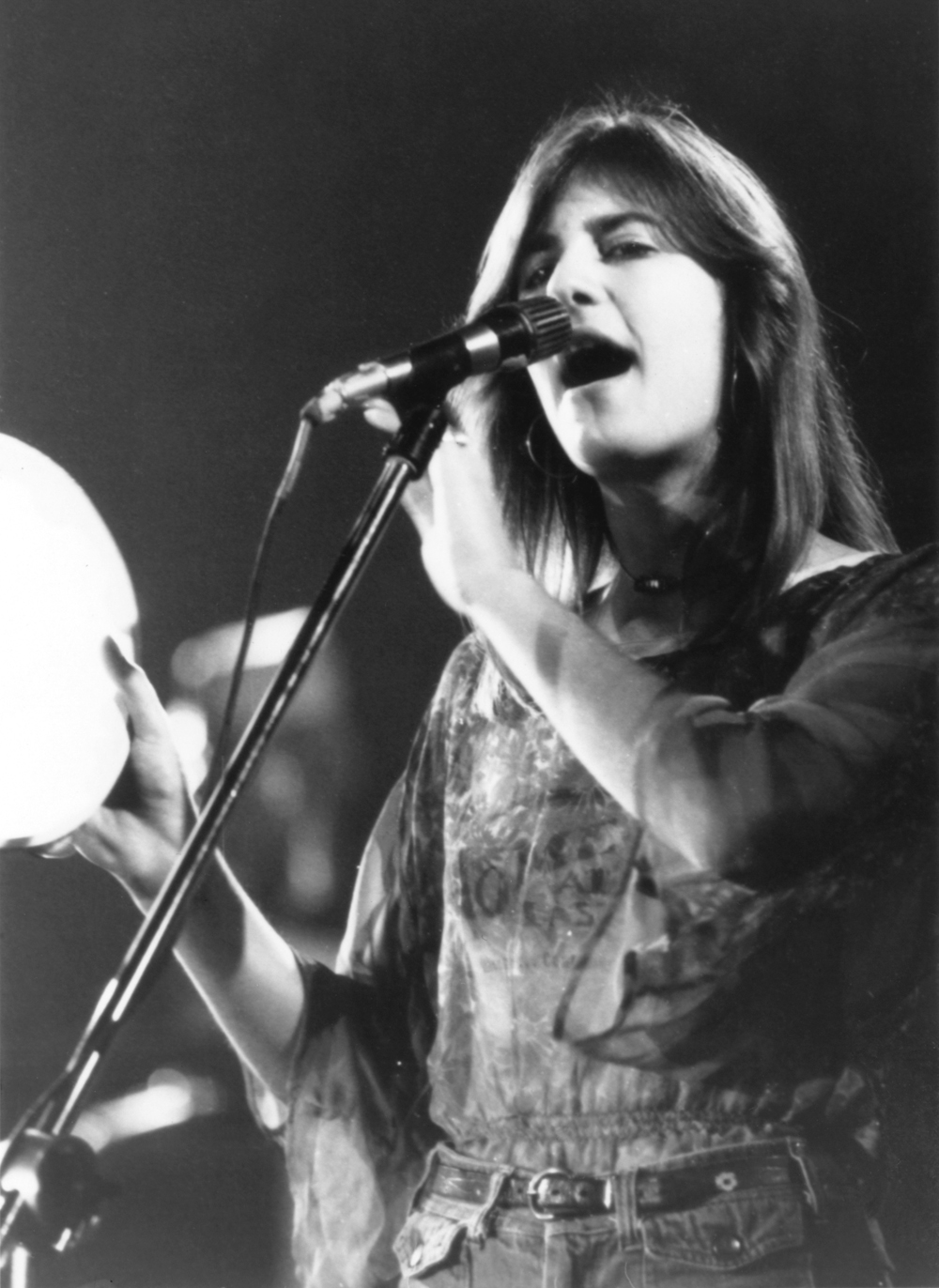
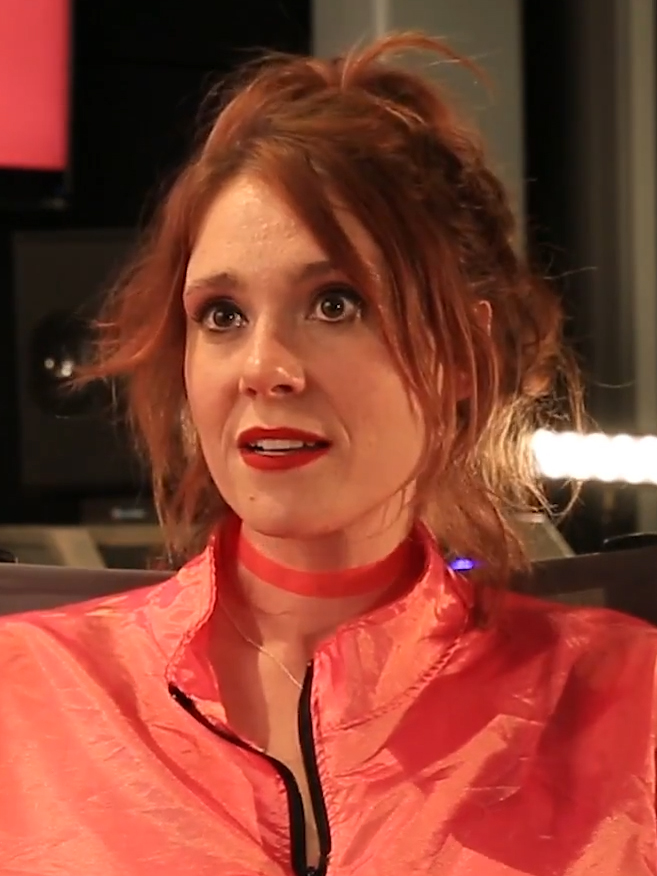
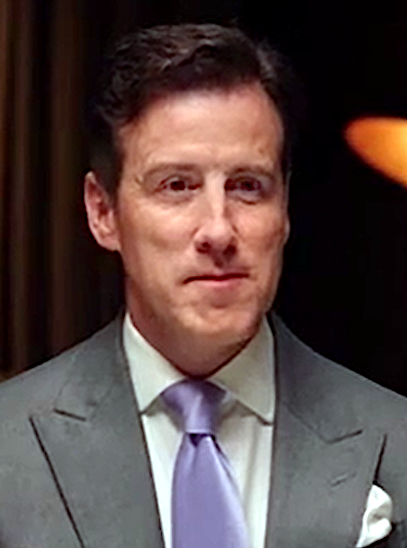
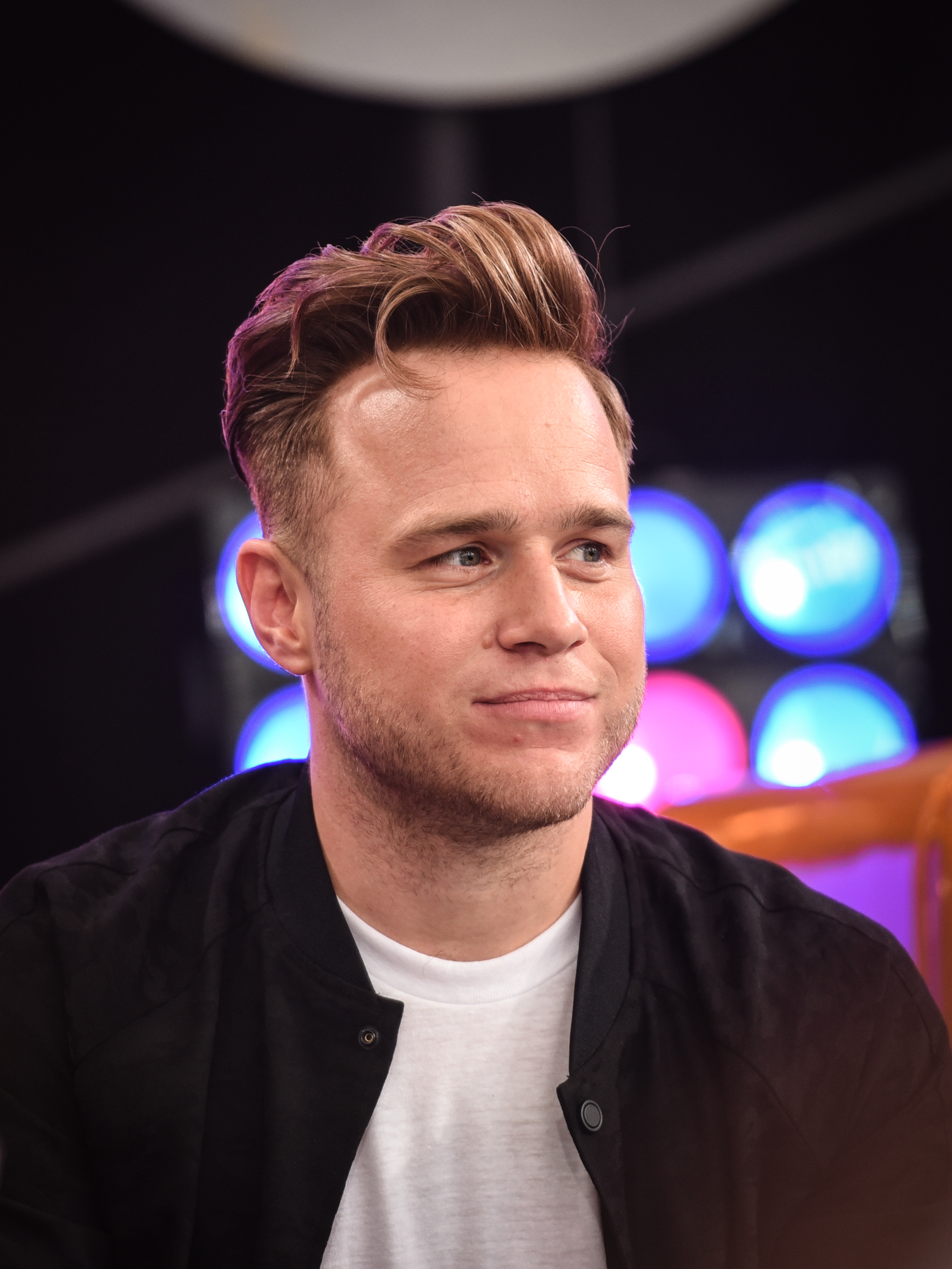
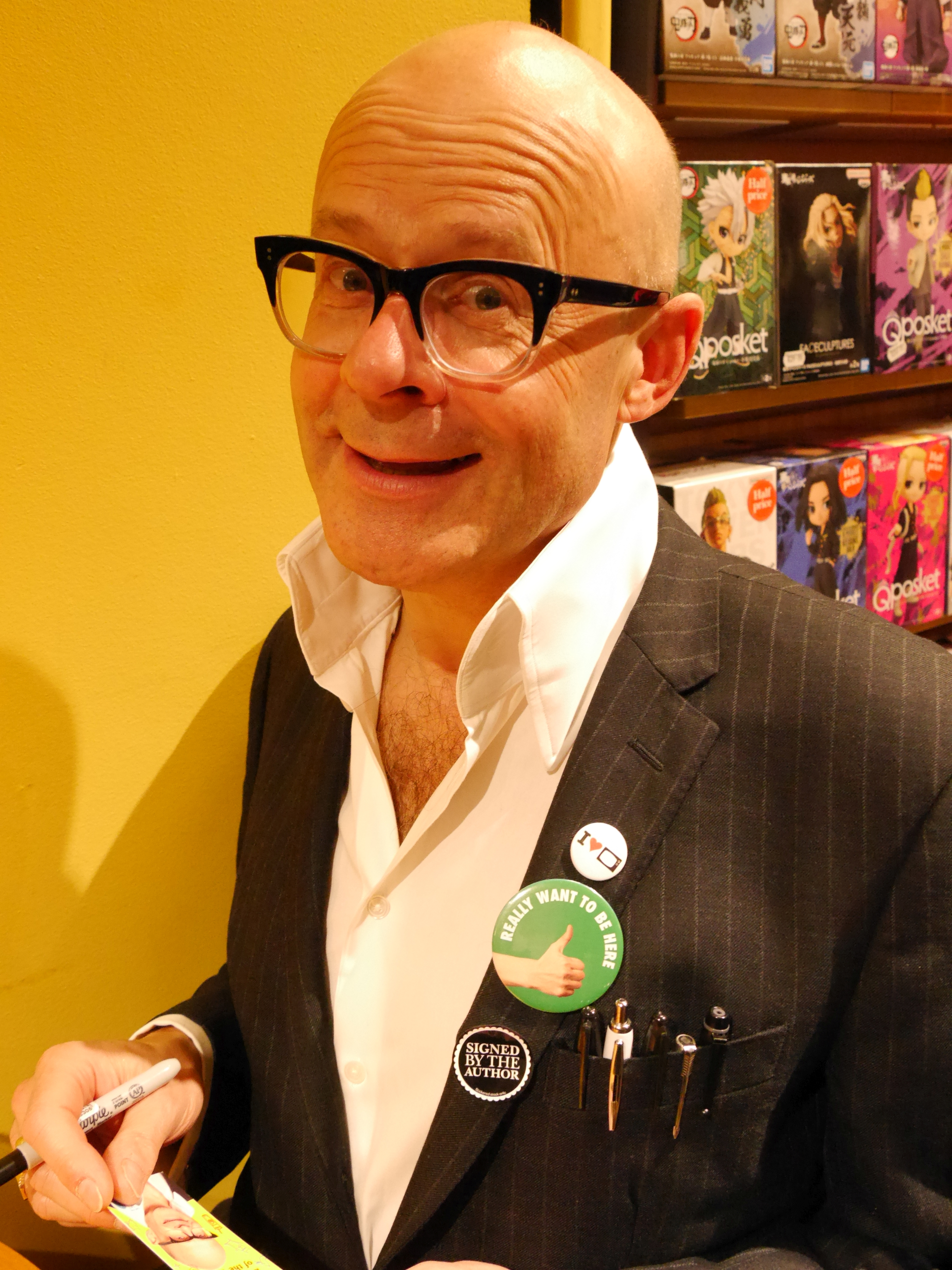
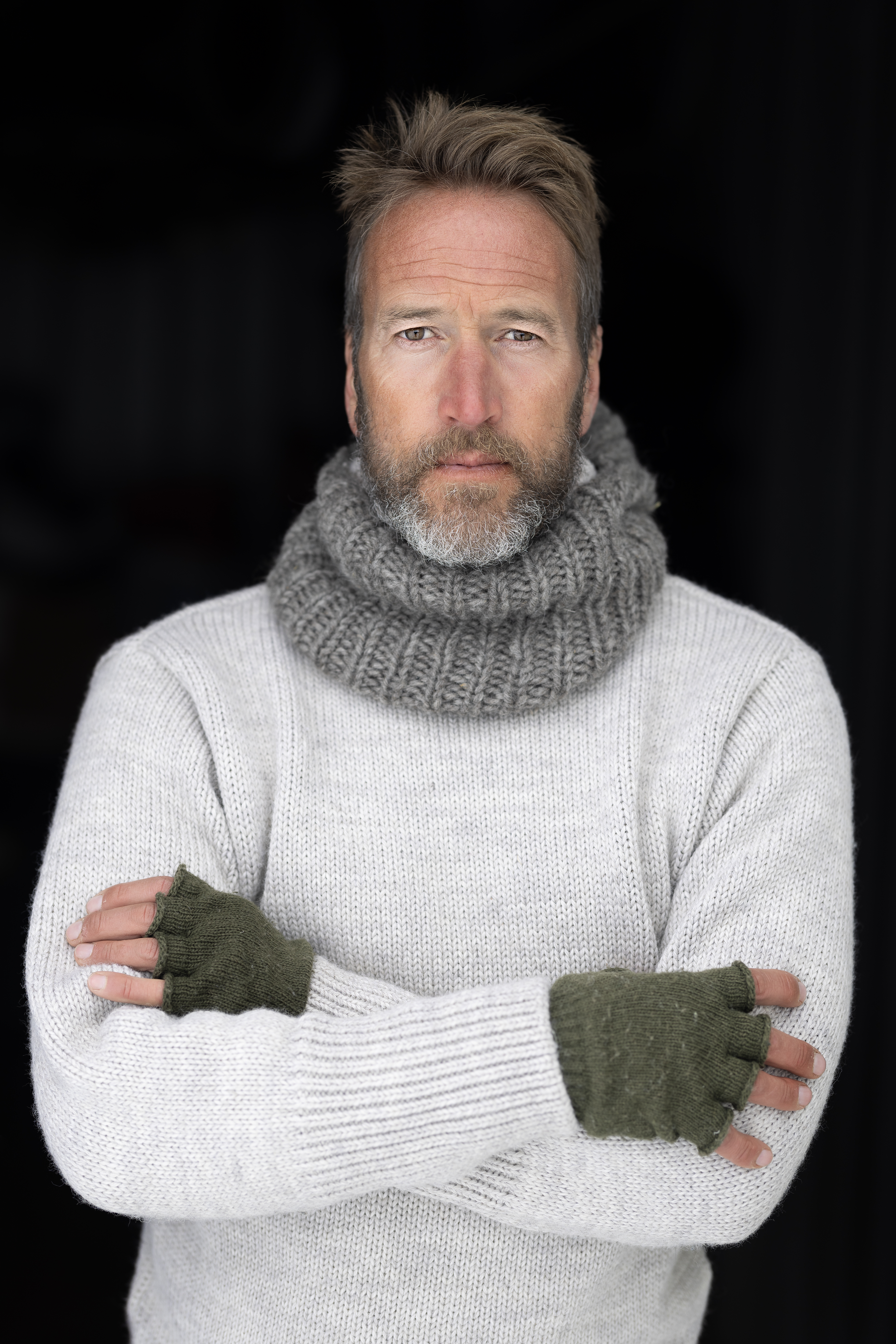
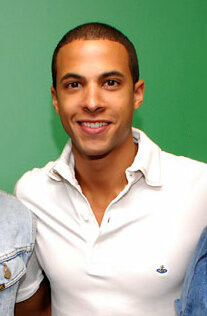
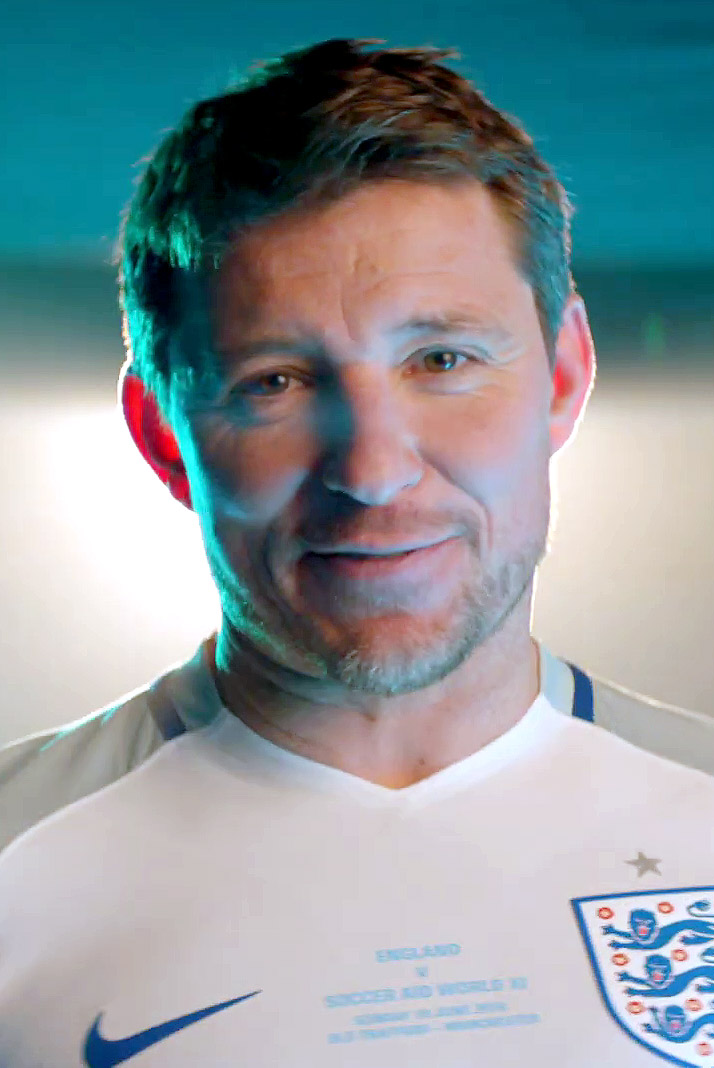
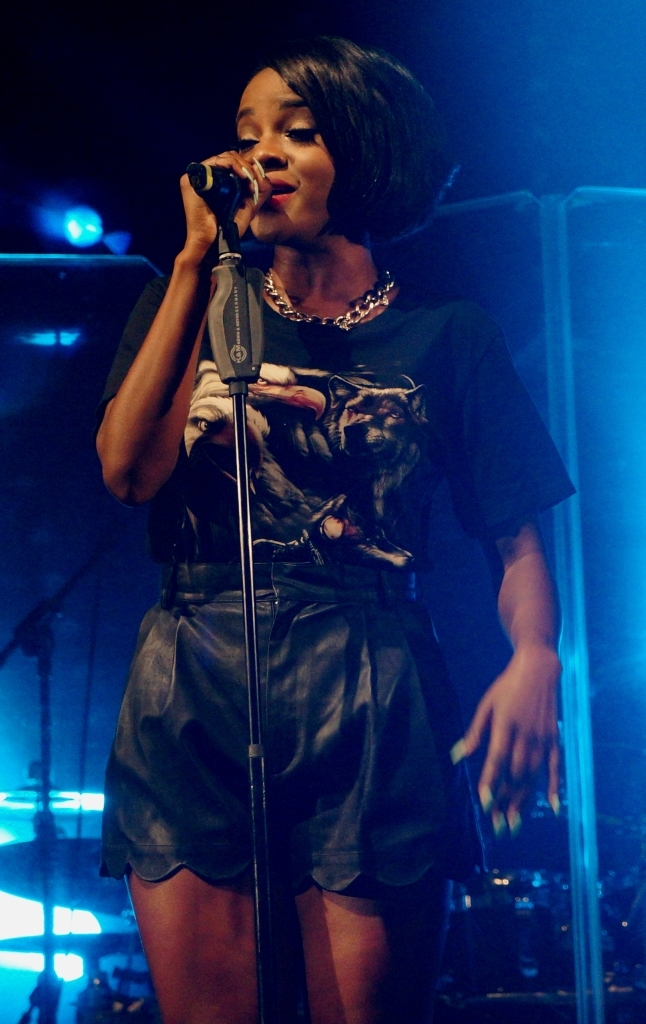
The celebrities who competed in the seventh series of The Masked Singer, pictured in order of elimination (L-R):
Special Guest: Anne-Marie ("Goldfish"), Alex Jones ("Disc Jockey"), Special Guest: Matt Lucas ("Emperor Penguin"), Professor Green ("Teabag"), John Lydon ("Yak"), Marcella Detroit ("Gargoyle"), Kate Nash ("Monkey Business"), Anton Du Beke ("Arctic Fox"), Special Guest: Olly Murs ("Mole Dommett"), Harry Hill ("Red Panda"), Ben Fogle ("Sloth"), Marvin Humes ("Can of Worms"), Ben Shephard ("Conkers"), and Keisha Buchanan ("Moth")

Not pictured: Mica Paris ("Toastie")

== Episodes ==
=== Episode 1 (3 January) ===
- Guest panelist: Anne-Marie

"Goldfish" and their masked band "No Trout" performed "APT." by Rosé and Bruno Mars. "Goldfish" was revealed to be Anne-Marie, who subsequently joined the panel. Anne-Marie later sang her signature song "2002" unmasked.

On the day this episode was due to air, ITV announced schedule changes with the episode duration being cut. It was later announced that "Red Panda" would be edited out of this episode due to their song choice not being appropriate following the then-recent 2026 Crans-Montana bar fire in Switzerland. The performance was, however, included on the video-on-demand version on Sky UK's Catch Up TV, and then later re-instated at a later point on ITVX.

Performances on the first episode
#	Stage name	Song	Identity	Result
1	Red Panda	"Disco Inferno" by The Trammps	undisclosed	SAFE
2	Moth	"Hero" by Mariah Carey	undisclosed	SAFE
3	Disc Jockey	"Pink Pony Club" by Chappell Roan	Alex Jones	OUT
4	Gargoyle	"Filthy/Gorgeous" by Scissor Sisters	undisclosed	RISK
5	Sloth	"Break My Stride" by Matthew Wilder	undisclosed	SAFE
6	Can of Worms	"Be Our Guest" from Beauty and the Beast	undisclosed	SAFE

=== Episode 2 (4 January) ===
- Guest panelist: Matt Lucas

"Emperor Penguin" and their masked band "Antarctic Funkeys" perform "Pinball Wizard" by The Who. "Emperor Penguin" was revealed to be Matt Lucas, who subsequently joined the panel.

Performances on the second episode
#	Stage name	Song	Identity	Result
1	Arctic Fox	"Get the Party Started" by Pink	undisclosed	SAFE
2	Yak	"Sex Bomb" by Tom Jones and Mousse T.	undisclosed	RISK
3	Toastie	"Walk This Way" by Aerosmith and Run-DMC	undisclosed	SAFE
4	Teabag	"Breakfast at Tiffany's" by Deep Blue Something	Professor Green	OUT
5	Conkers	"Nice to Meet You" by Myles Smith	undisclosed	SAFE
6	Monkey Business	"Maneater" by Hall & Oates	undisclosed	SAFE

=== Episode 3 (10 January) ===
Theme: Sports

- Group number: "Lionheart (Fearless)" by Joel Corry and Tom Grennan
- Guest panelist: Freddie Flintoff

Performances on the third episode
#	Stage name	Song	Result	
1	Monkey Business	"Strong Enough" by Cher	RISK	
2	Toastie	"Run to You" by Whitney Houston	SAFE	
3	Yak	"Physical" by Olivia Newton-John	RISK	
4	Arctic Fox	"Gold" by Spandau Ballet	SAFE	
5	Conkers	"Jump Around" by House of Pain	SAFE	
Sing-Off			Identity	Result
1	Monkey Business	"TiK ToK" by Kesha	undisclosed	SAFE
2	Yak	"That's Amore" by Dean Martin	John Lydon	OUT

=== Episode 4 (17 January) ===
Theme: Halloween

- Group number: "Larger than Life" by Backstreet Boys
- Guest panelist: Ben Shephard

Performances on the fourth episode
#	Stage name	Song	Result	
1	Can of Worms	"Ghostbusters" by Ray Parker Jr.	SAFE	
2	Sloth	"Tainted Love" by Soft Cell	RISK	
3	Gargoyle	"Bring Me to Life" by Evanescence	RISK	
4	Moth	"Vampire" by Olivia Rodrigo	SAFE	
5	Red Panda	"Bat Out of Hell" by Meat Loaf	SAFE	
Sing-Off			Identity	Result
1	Sloth	"Flash Bang Wallop" by Tommy Steele	undisclosed	SAFE
2	Gargoyle	"Bad Reputation" by Joan Jett	Marcella Detroit	OUT

- After being unmasked, Detroit sang "Stay" by Shakespears Sister as her encore performance.

=== Episode 5 (24 January) ===
- Guest panelist: Perrie Edwards

Performances on the fifth episode
#	Stage name	Song	Identity	Result
1	Toastie	"Beautiful Things" by Benson Boone	undisclosed	SAFE
2	Red Panda	"Big Girls Don't Cry" by Frankie Valli and the Four Seasons	undisclosed	RISK
3	Monkey Business	"As Long As He Needs Me" from Oliver!	Kate Nash	OUT
4	Arctic Fox	"Woman in Love" by Barbra Streisand	Anton Du Beke	OUT
5	Can of Worms	"Temperature" by Sean Paul	undisclosed	SAFE
6	Conkers	"I'm a Believer" by The Monkees	undisclosed	SAFE
7	Moth	"Anxiety" by Doechii	undisclosed	SAFE
8	Sloth	"Green Green Grass" by George Ezra	undisclosed	SAFE

=== Episode 6 (31 January) ===
- Guest panelist: Olly Murs

"Mole-Dommett" was revealed to be Olly Murs, who subsequently joined the panel.

Performances on the sixth episode
#	Stage name	Song	Identity	Result
1	Red Panda	"I Gotta Feeling" by The Black Eyed Peas	Harry Hill	OUT
2	Moth	"Leave (Get Out)" by JoJo	undisclosed	SAFE
3	Can of Worms	"Pure Imagination" by Gene Wilder	undisclosed	SAFE
4	Sloth	"Tubthumping" by Chumbawamba	undisclosed	SAFE
5	Conkers	"History" by One Direction	undisclosed	SAFE
6	Toastie	"River Deep, Mountain High" by Ike & Tina Turner	undisclosed	SAFE

=== Episode 7: Semi-final (7 February) ===
- Guest panelist: Katherine Ryan

First performances on the seventh episode
#	Stage name	Song	Identity	Result
1	Toastie	"It's Raining Men" by The Weather Girls	undisclosed	SAFE
2	Conkers	"Everybody in Love" by JLS	undisclosed	SAFE
3	Sloth	"We All Stand Together" by Paul McCartney and The Frog Chorus	Ben Fogle	OUT
4	Moth	"Man I Need" by Olivia Dean	undisclosed	SAFE
5	Can of Worms	"Cha Cha Slide" by DJ Casper	undisclosed	SAFE

Second performances on the seventh episode
#	Stage name	Song	Identity	Result
1	Toastie	"You're Still The One" by Shania Twain	undisclosed	SAFE
2	Conkers	"Country House" by Blur	undisclosed	SAFE
3	Can of Worms	"Ordinary People" by John Legend	Marvin Humes	OUT
4	Moth	"Colors of the Wind" by Vanessa Williams	undisclosed	SAFE

=== Episode 8: Final (14 February) ===
- Guest performance: Samantha Barks perform "Golden" by HUNTR/X
- Guest panelist: Samantha Barks

First performances on the eighth episode
#	Stage name	Song
1	Conkers	"Keep on Movin'" by Five
2	Moth	"I Want to Know What Love Is" by Mariah Carey
3	Toastie	"A Star Is Born" by Jocelyn Brown

Second performances on the eighth episode
#	Stage name	Song	Duet partner	Identity	Result
1	Conkers	"(I've Had) The Time of My Life" by Bill Medley and Jennifer Warnes	Andrea Corr (Snail)	undisclosed	SAFE
2	Moth	"Die With a Smile" by Bruno Mars and Lady Gaga	Will Young (Lionfish)	undisclosed	SAFE
3	Toastie	"Sisters Are Doin' It for Themselves" by Eurythmics and Aretha Franklin	Samantha Barks (Pufferfish)	Mica Paris	THIRD PLACE

In a change to this year's format, instead of performing one of their previous songs from the series, the final two contestants, "Moth" and "Conkers" took part in a "Final Face Off", in which they took turns to sing a different song, before duetting together.

Third performances on the eighth episode
#	Stage name	Song	Identity	Result
1	Moth	"Only Girl (In the World)" by Rihanna	Keisha Buchanan	WINNER
2	Conkers	"Mr. Brightside" by The Killers	Ben Shephard	RUNNER-UP

- After singing to their individual songs in the Final Face Off, "Moth" and "Conkers" concluded their battle singing to "2 Be Loved (Am I Ready)" by Lizzo simultaneously.

== Ratings ==
Official ratings are taken from BARB, utilising the four-screen dashboard which includes viewers who watched the programme on laptops, smartphones, and tablets within 7 days of the original broadcast.

Episode	Date	Official 7 day rating (millions)	Weekly rank for ITV	Weekly rank for all UK TV
1	3 January	3.39	12	40
2	4 January	3.18	13	42
3	10 January	3.75	14	30
4	17 January	3.22	12	34
5	24 January	3.37	13	35
6	31 January	3.09	14	39
7	7 February	3.11	11	33
8	14 February	3.60	8	14
Series average	2026	3.34	—N/a	
