= The Masked Singer (British TV series) series 6 =

Season of television series

The Masked Singer
- Series 6
- Starring: Mo Gilligan; Maya Jama; Davina McCall; Jonathan Ross
- Hosted by: Joel Dommett
- No. of contestants: 12
- Winner: Samantha Barks as "Pufferfish"
- Runner-up: Gregory Porter as "Dressed Crab"
- No. of episodes: 8

Release
- Original network: ITV
- Original release: 4 January – 15 February 2025

Series chronology
- ← Previous; Series 5 Next → Series 7

The sixth series of the British version of The Masked Singer premiered on ITV on 4 January 2025, following a Christmas special episode on 26 December 2024. Joel Dommett returned as the show's presenter, whilst Mo Gilligan, Davina McCall, Jonathan Ross returned as panellists, along with Maya Jama who replaced Rita Ora on the panel. The series is the first in another two-year commissioning by ITV and was also accompanied by a digital spin-off show for the second time, titled The After Mask, presented by Harriet Rose.

The series was won by singer/actress Samantha Barks as "Pufferfish", whilst singer Gregory Porter finished second as "Dressed Crab" and singer Marti Pellow finished third as "Wolf".

== Production ==
The commissioning of the sixth series was announced by ITV in October 2024, as part of a further two-year contract. Filming for the series began in September 2024 at Bovingdon Studios in Hertfordshire, with the public being invited to apply for tickets to be in the audience, before concluding in October 2024. The series began airing on 4 January 2025, following the show's Christmas special episode that aired on 26 December 2024. It was also confirmed that the show would be accompanied by a digital spin-off show for the first time, The After Mask, presented by Harriet Rose and airing exclusively on ITVX and YouTube.

== Panellists and host ==
Series 6 panellists and host

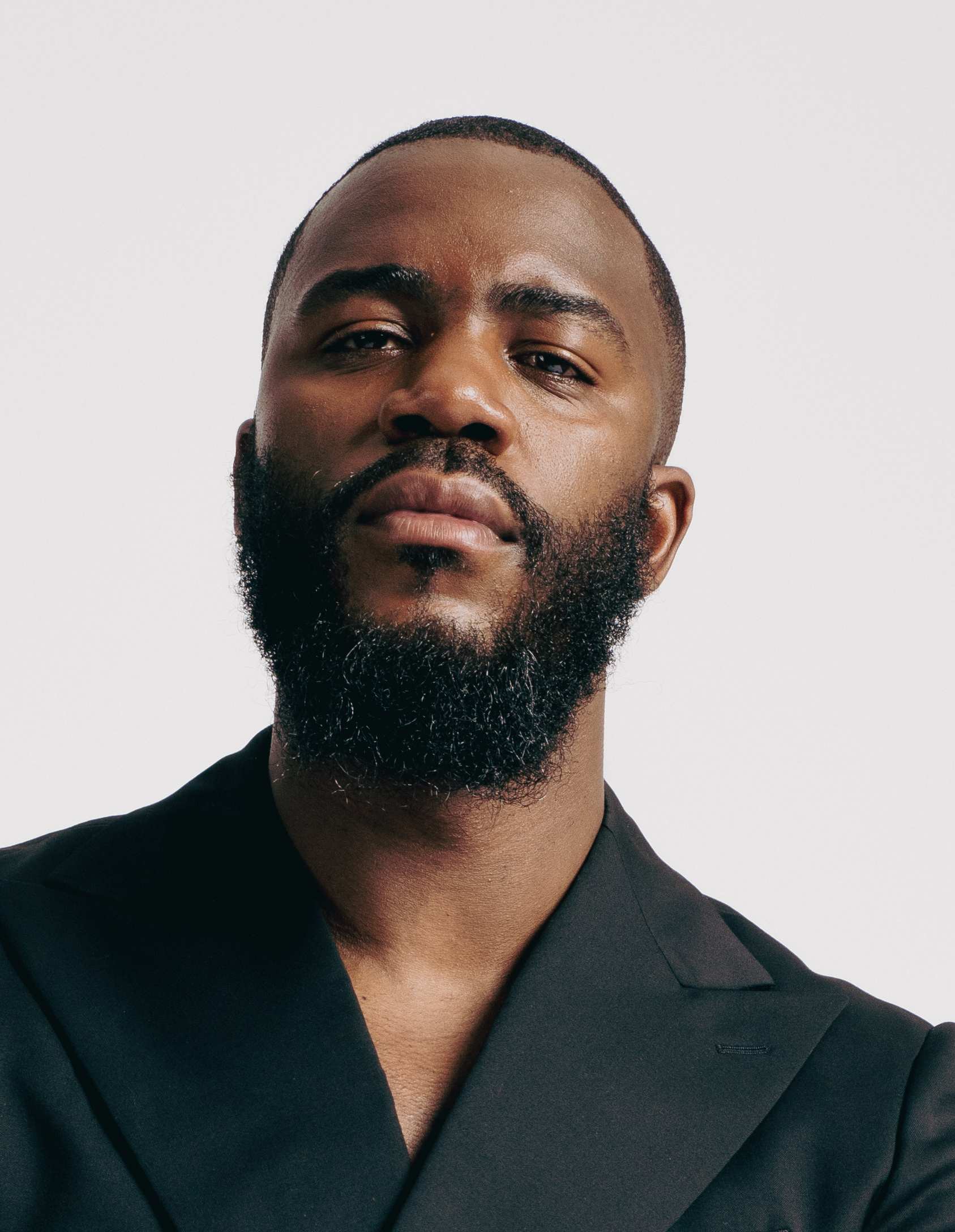
Mo Gilligan

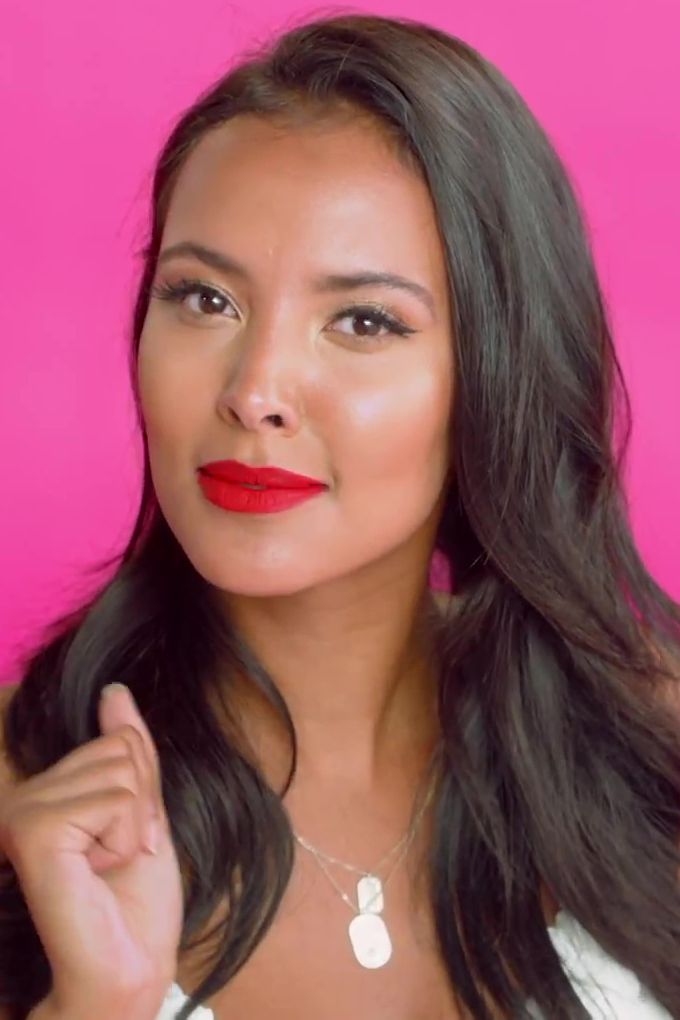
Maya Jama

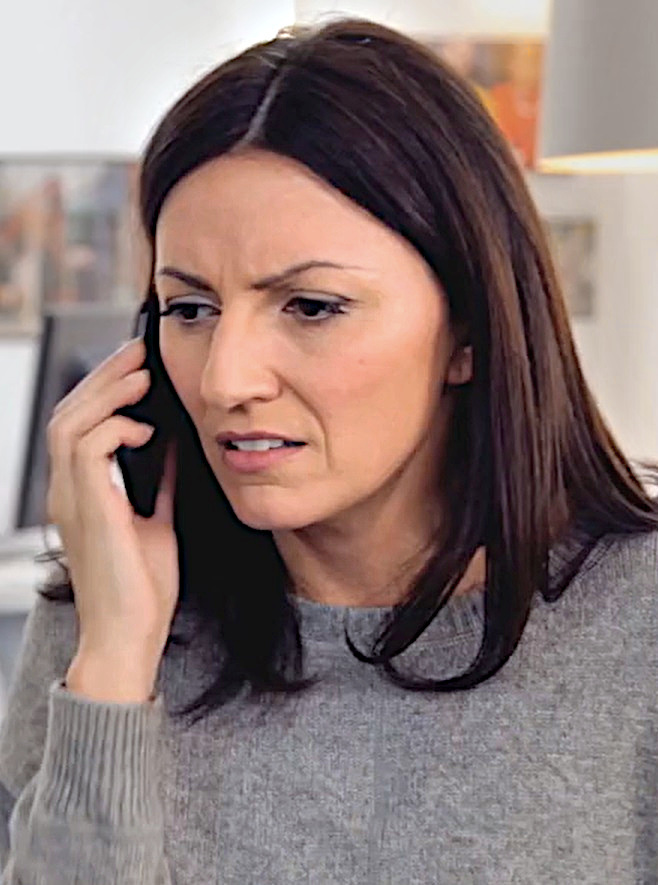
Davina McCall

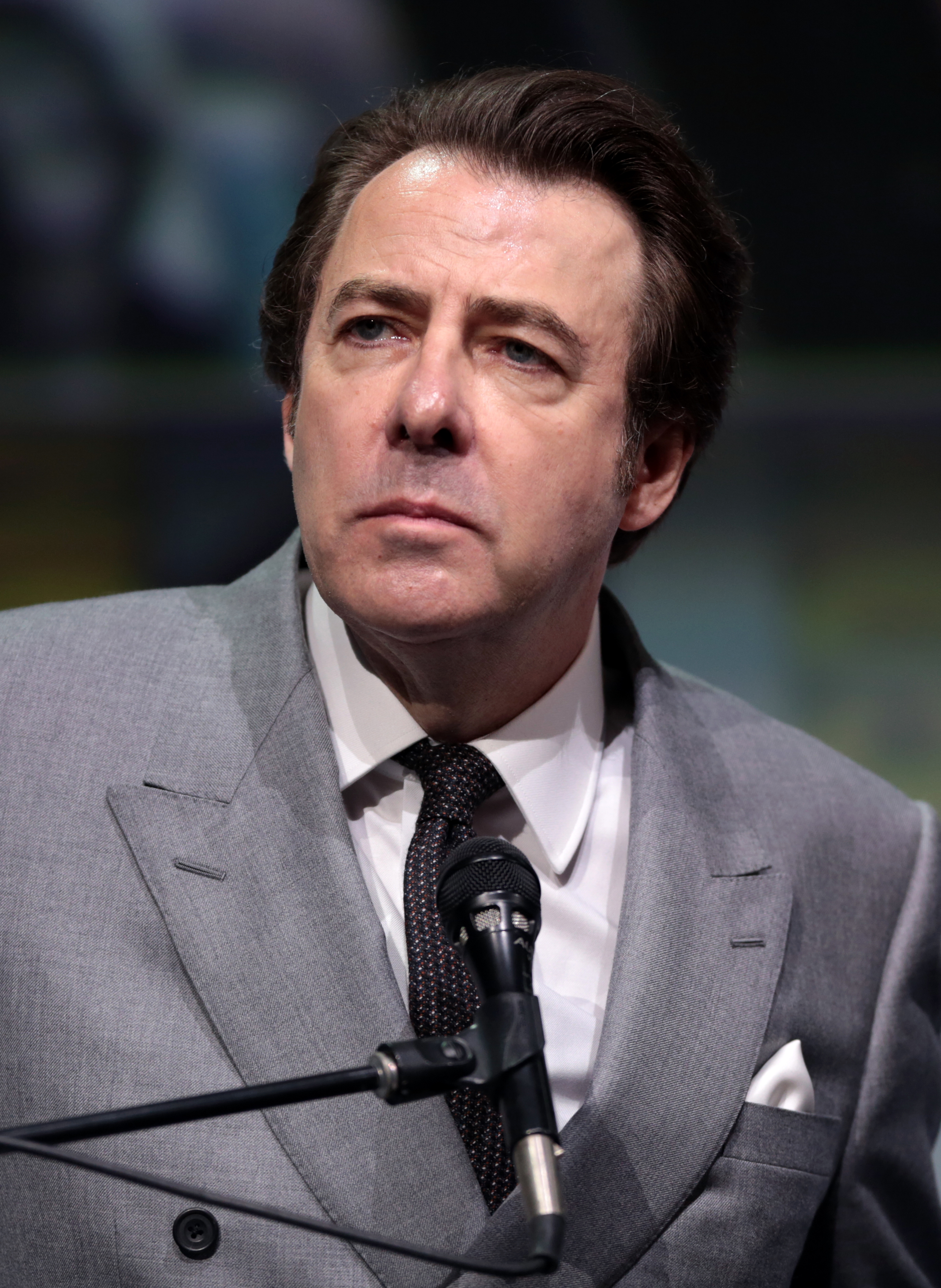
Jonathan Ross

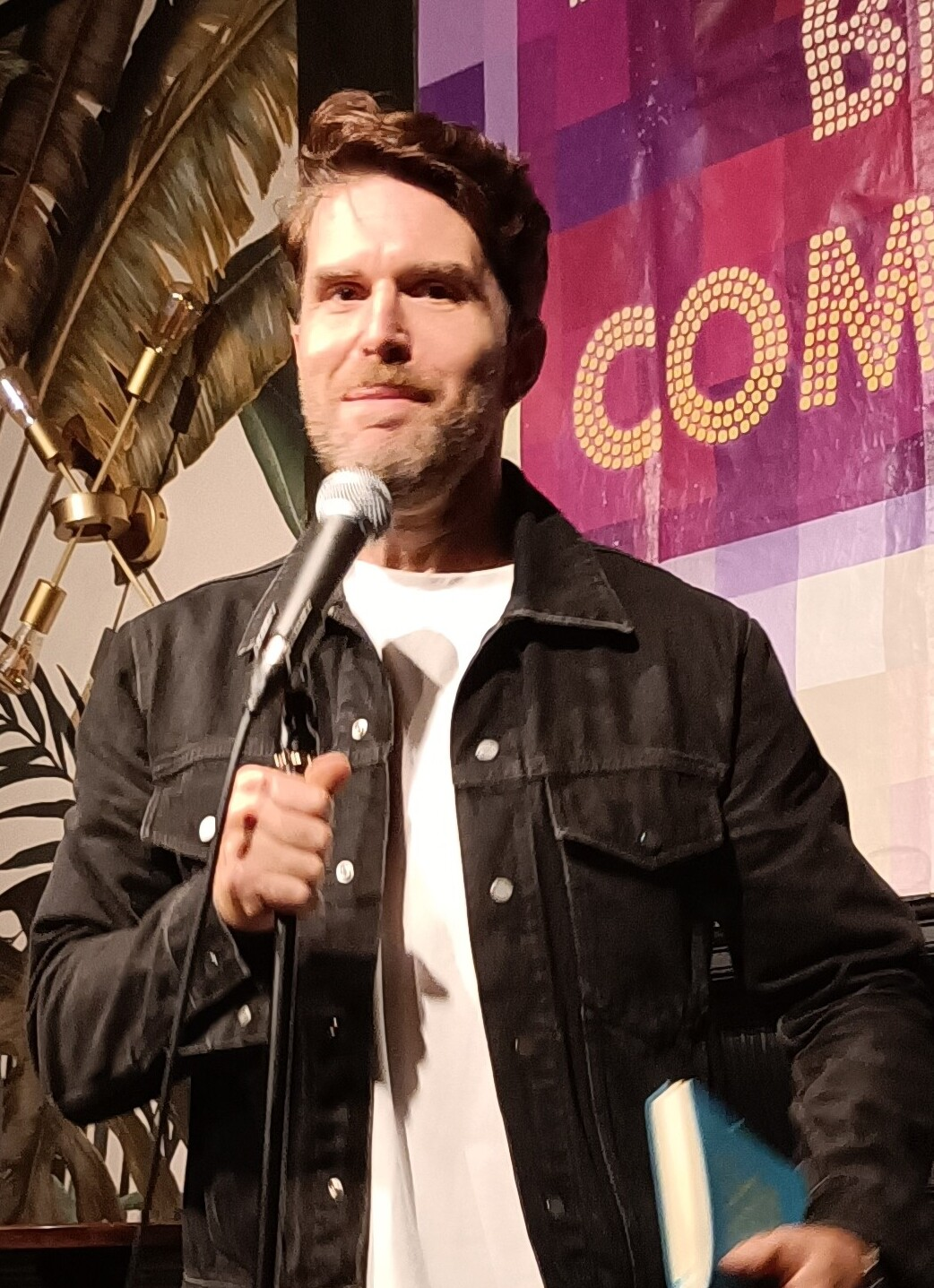
Joel Dommett

Prior to the series airing, it was announced that Joel Dommett would return as the show's presenter, with Jonathan Ross, Davina McCall, Mo Gilligan all returning to the panel. Rita Ora was confirmed to be leaving the show after five series, with Maya Jama subsequently being announced as her replacement.

Mo Farah served as a guest panellist for the first episode after being revealed as "Giant Joel". Vicky McClure, Suranne Jones, and Tom Daley served as guest panellists for the second, third, and fourth episodes respectively. Gilligan was not present during the semi final and final of the series, filling in for Gilligan were Richard E. Grant and Danny Jones (who won the previous series as "Piranha").

== Contestants ==
The twelve costumes for the sixth series were released on 7 December 2024. Also, an additional character, Giant Joel, based on presenter Joel Dommett, was introduced in the 2024 Christmas special, and was unmasked and revealed as Mo Farah in the first episode.

Stage name	Celebrity	Occupation	Episodes							
Stage name	Celebrity	Occupation	1	2	3	4	5	6	7	8
Pufferfish	Samantha Barks	Actress/singer		SAFE	SAFE		SAFE	RISK	SAFE	WINNER
Dressed Crab	Gregory Porter	Singer	SAFE			RISK	SAFE	SAFE	SAFE	RUNNER-UP
Wolf	Marti Pellow	Singer		SAFE	SAFE		SAFE	SAFE	SAFE	THIRD
Bush	Natalie Cassidy	Actress		RISK	SAFE		SAFE	SAFE	OUT	
Bear	Example	Musician		SAFE	RISK		RISK	SAFE	OUT	
Snail	Andrea Corr	Singer	SAFE			SAFE	SAFE	OUT		
Kingfisher	Grayson Perry	Artist	SAFE			SAFE	SAFE	OUT		
Teeth	Mel Giedroyc	Comedian/TV presenter	RISK			SAFE	OUT			
Tattoo	Carol Decker	Singer	SAFE			OUT				
Toad in the Hole	Macy Gray	Singer		SAFE	OUT					
Pegasus	Prue Leith	Restaurateur		OUT						
Spag Bol	Kate Garraway	TV presenter	OUT (Note: Despite being eliminated in the first episode, Spag Bol was not unmasked until the beginning of the second episode.)							

The masked singer was safe from elimination.
The masked singer was in the bottom two, but was not eliminated.
The masked singer was eliminated from the competition and unmasked upon their elimination.
The masked singer did not perform.
The masked singer won the competition.
The masked singer finished second.
The masked singer finished third.
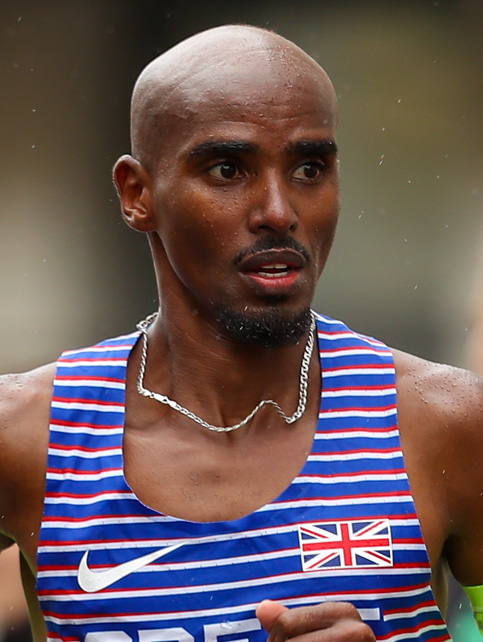
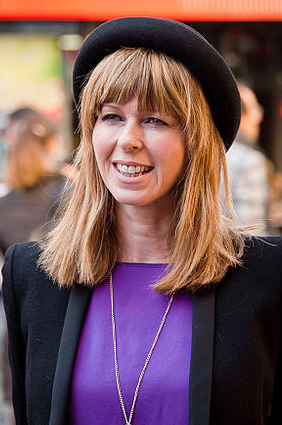
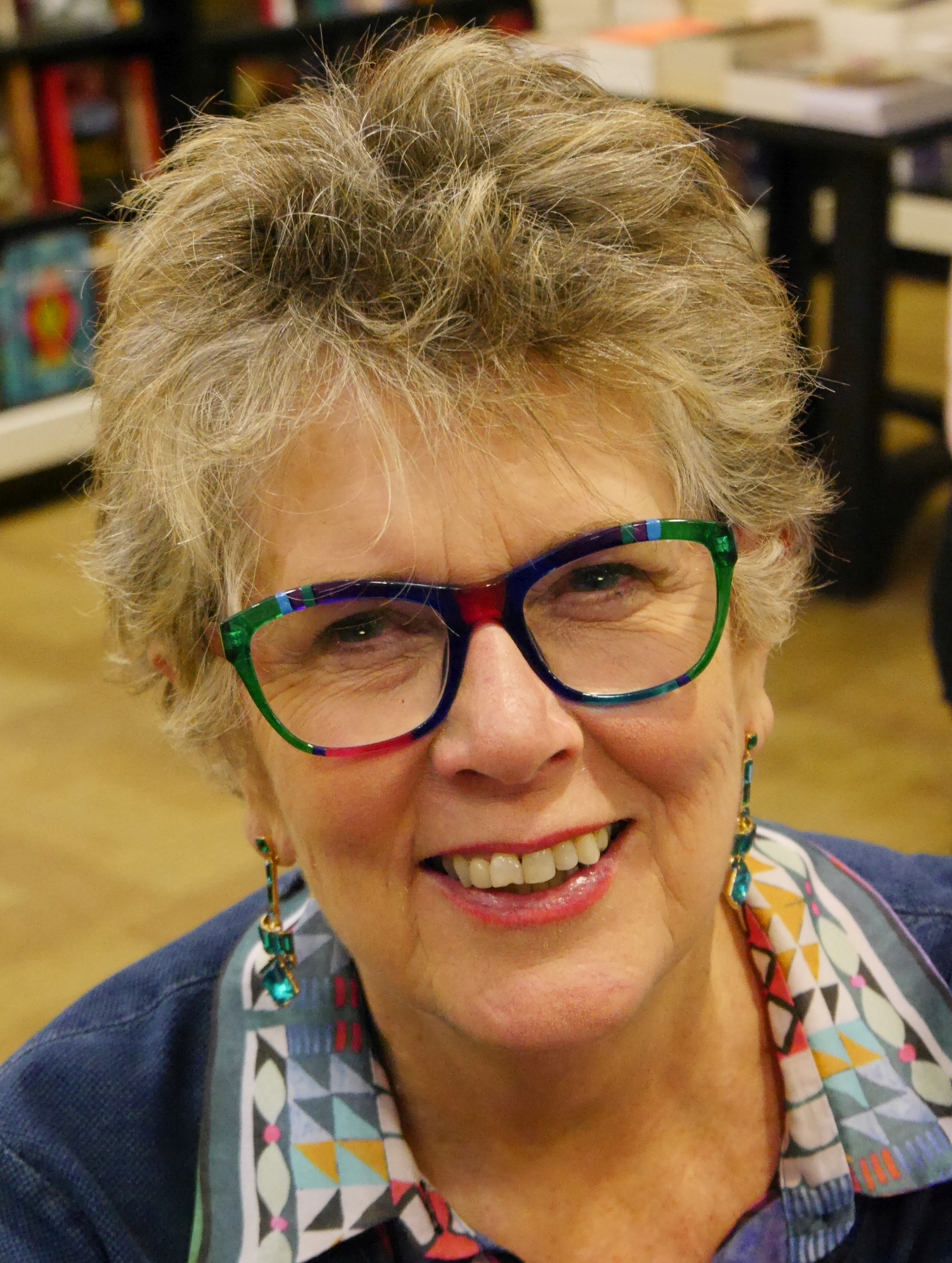
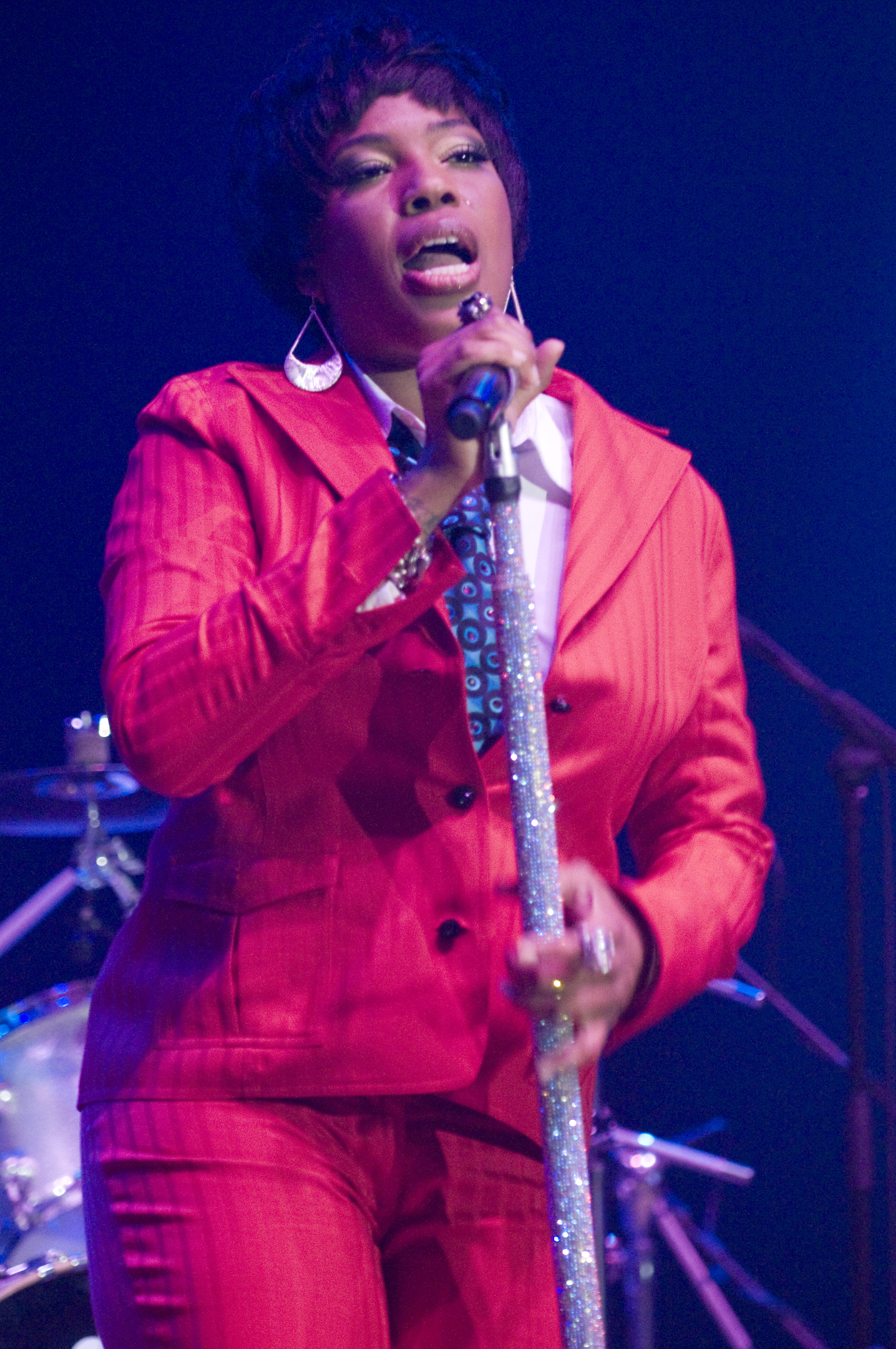
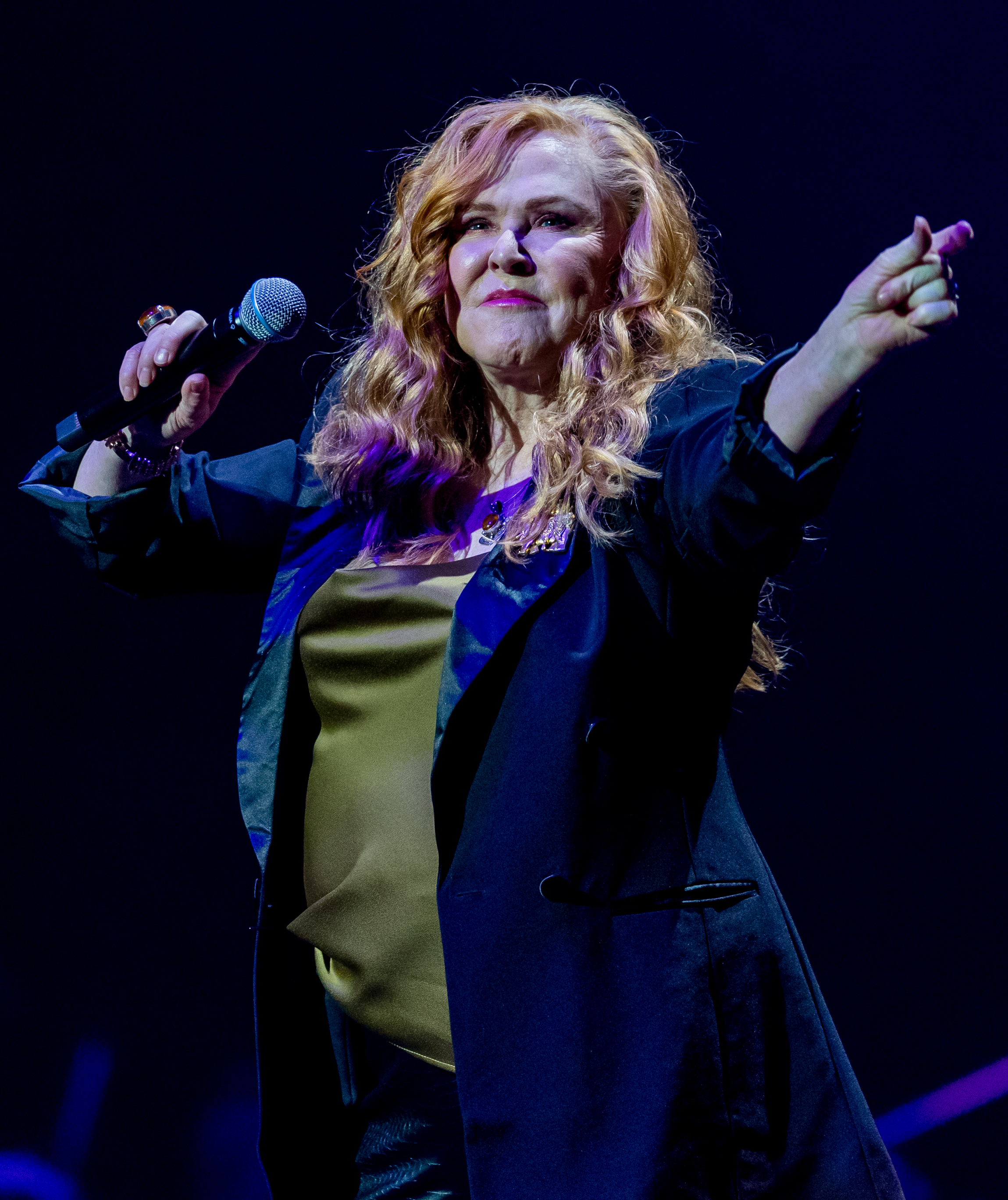
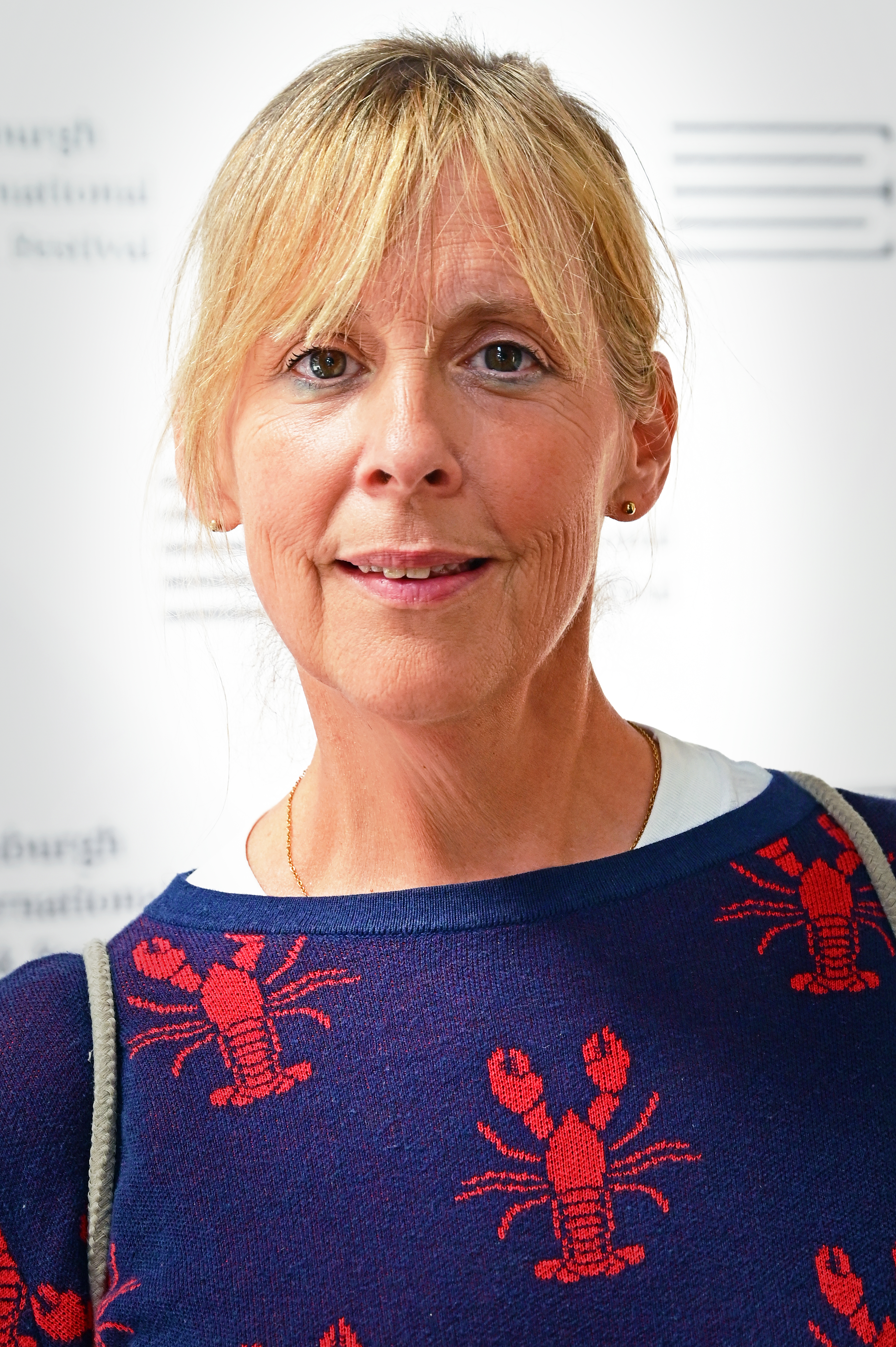
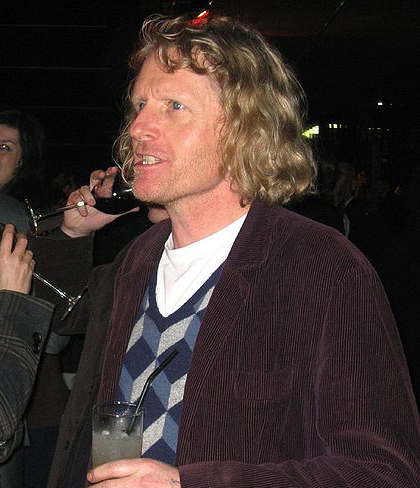
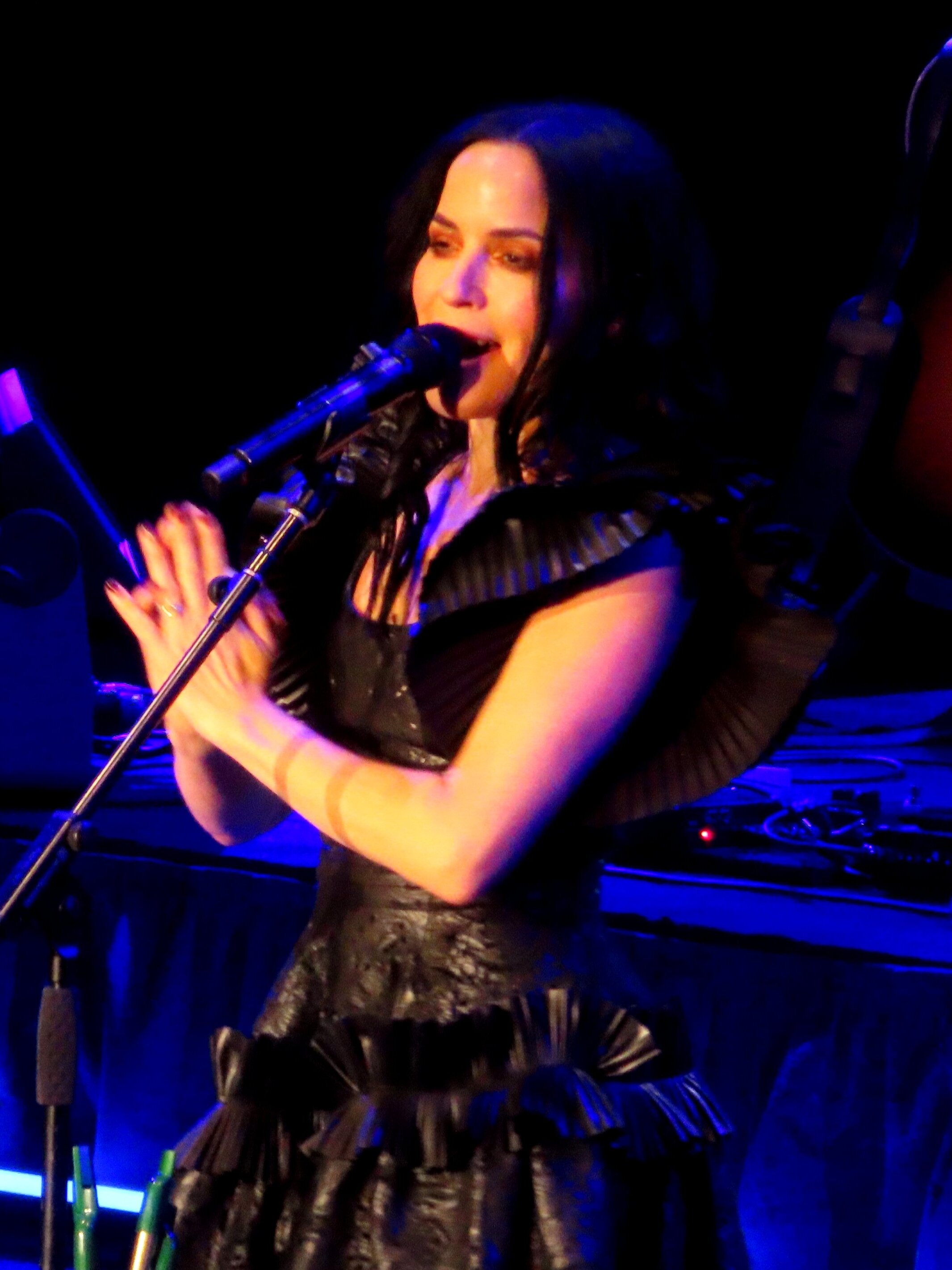
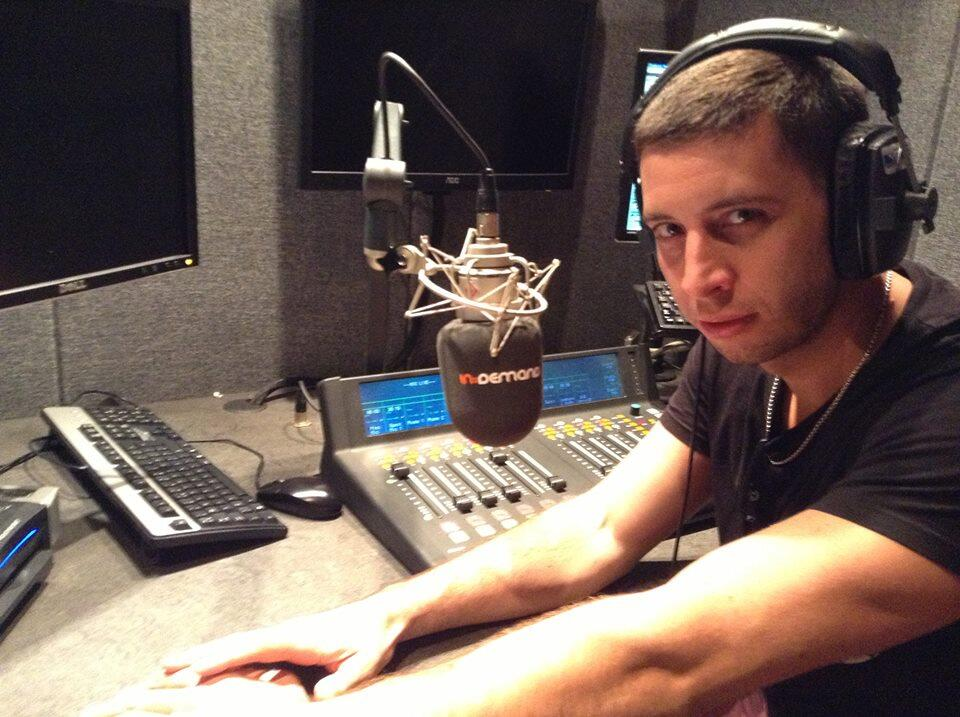
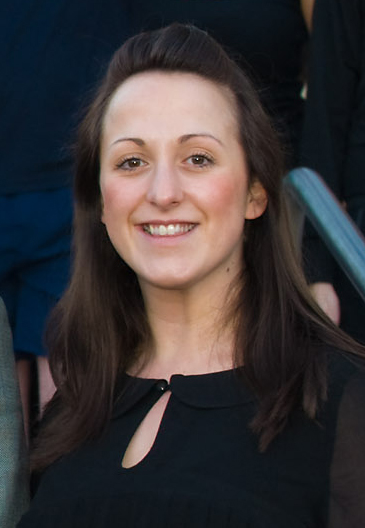
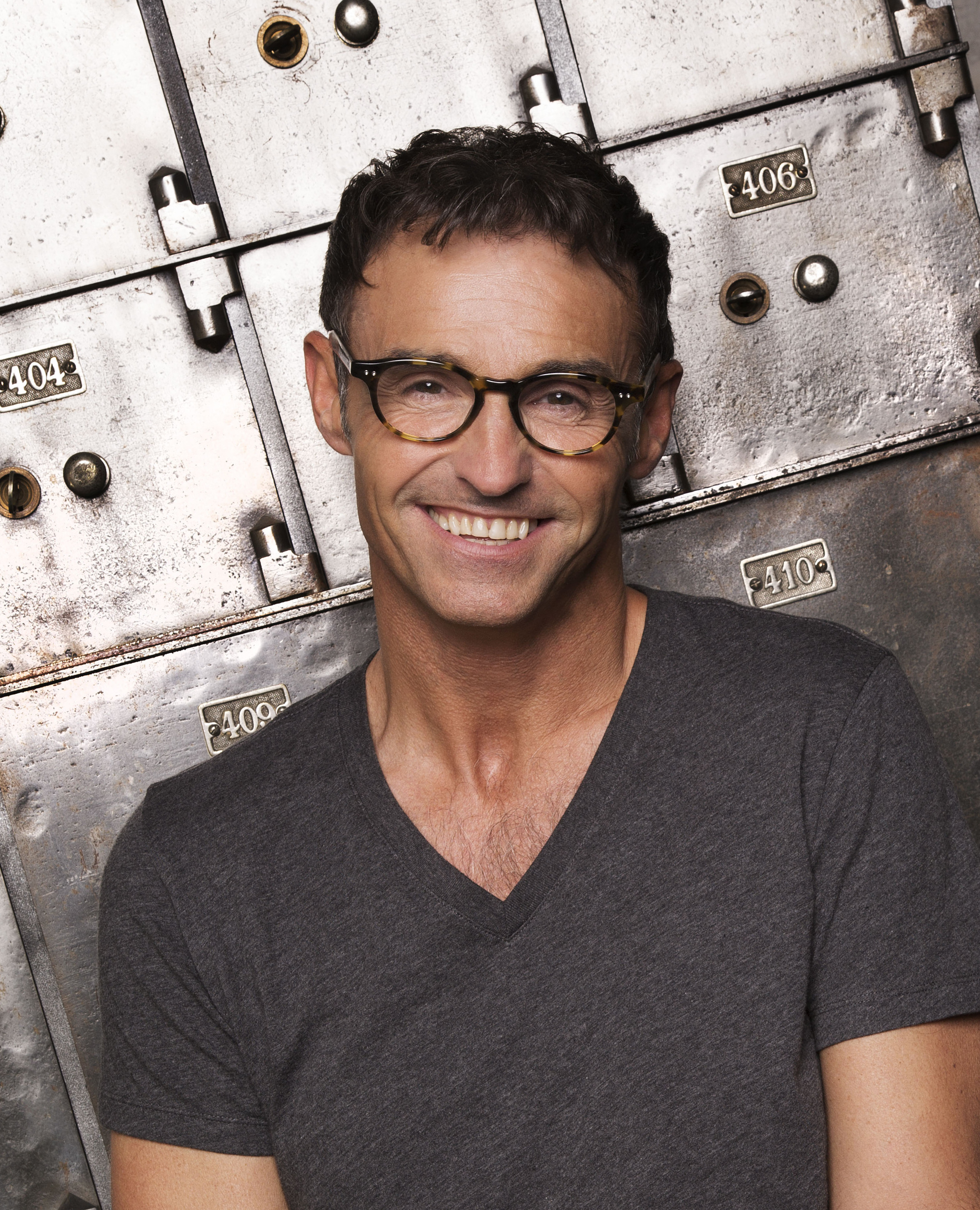
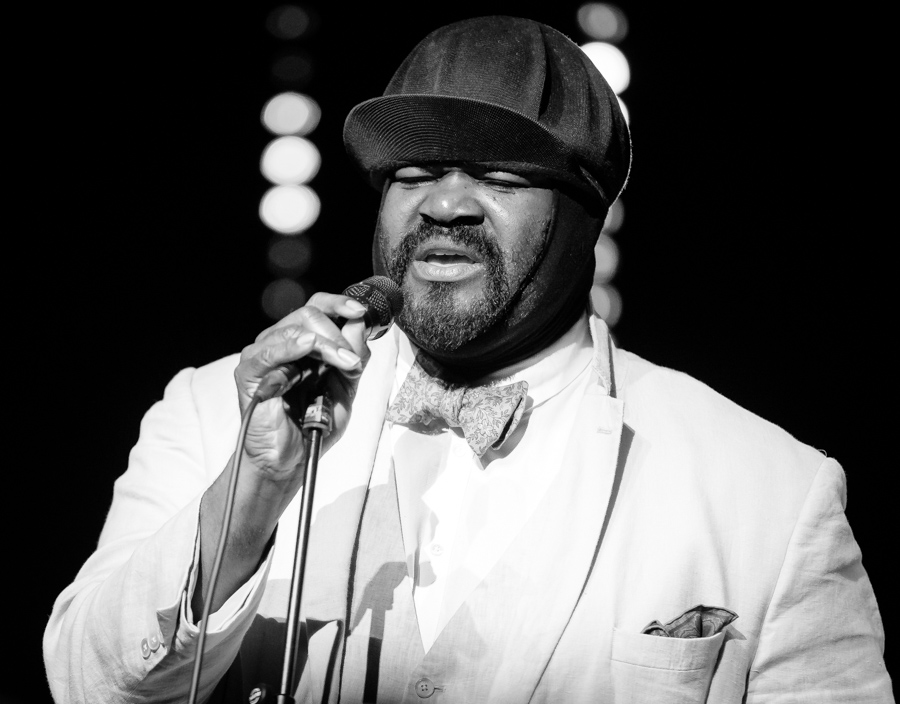
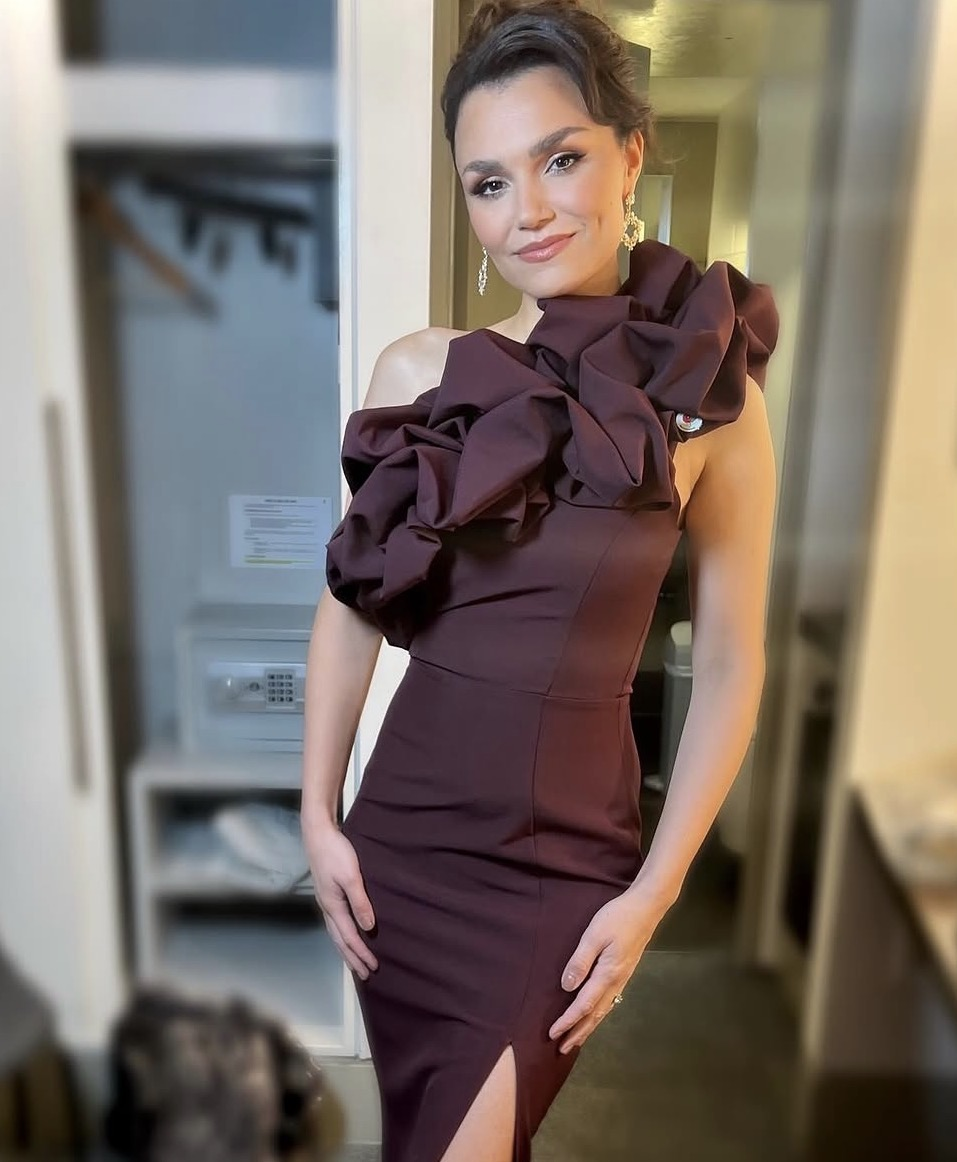
The celebrities who competed in the sixth series of The Masked Singer, pictured in order of elimination (L-R):
Special Guest: Mo Farah ("Giant Joel"), Kate Garraway ("Spag Bol"), Prue Leith ("Pegasus"), Macy Gray ("Toad in the Hole"), Carol Decker ("Tattoo"), Mel Giedroyc ("Teeth"), Grayson Perry ("Kingfisher"), Andrea Corr ("Snail"), Example ("Bear"), Natalie Cassidy ("Bush"), Marti Pellow ("Wolf"), Gregory Porter ("Dressed Crab"), and Samantha Barks ("Pufferfish")

== Episodes ==
=== Episode 1 (4 January) ===
- Group number: "Who Do You Think You Are" by Spice Girls
- Guest panelist: Mo Farah

Performances on the first episode
#	Stage name	Song	Identity	Result
1	Teeth	"(Is This the Way to) Amarillo" by Tony Christie	undisclosed	RISK
2	Snail	"Espresso" by Sabrina Carpenter	undisclosed	SAFE
3	Tattoo	"Murder on the Dancefloor" by Sophie Ellis-Bextor	undisclosed	SAFE
4	Kingfisher	"The Rainbow Connection" from The Muppet Movie	undisclosed	SAFE
5	Spag Bol	"Look at Me" by Geri Halliwell	Kate Garraway	OUT
6	Dressed Crab	"Lean on Me" by Bill Withers	undisclosed	SAFE

=== Episode 2 (5 January) ===
- Guest panelist: Vicky McClure

Performances on the second episode
#	Stage name	Song	Identity	Result
1	Pufferfish	"Good Luck, Babe!" by Chappell Roan	undisclosed	SAFE
2	Bush	"Wake Up Boo!" by The Boo Radleys	undisclosed	RISK
3	Wolf	"Let's Dance" by David Bowie	undisclosed	SAFE
4	Pegasus	"Oh, What a Beautiful Mornin'" by Gordon MacRae	Prue Leith	OUT
5	Toad in the Hole	"Valerie" by Amy Winehouse	undisclosed	SAFE
6	Bear	"You've Got to Pick a Pocket or Two" from Oliver!	undisclosed	SAFE

=== Episode 3 (11 January) ===
Theme: Summer Holiday

- Group number: "Hot Hot Hot" by Arrow
- Guest panelist: Suranne Jones

Performances on the third episode
#	Stage name	Song	Result	
1	Bear	"Miami" by Will Smith	RISK	
2	Toad in the Hole	"Sunny" by Boney M.	RISK	
3	Pufferfish	"Girls Just Want to Have Fun" by Cyndi Lauper	SAFE	
4	Bush	"Hold My Hand" by Jess Glynne	SAFE	
5	Wolf	"Copacabana (At the Copa)" by Barry Manilow	SAFE	
Sing-Off			Identity	Result
1	Bear	"Stay" by Justin Bieber and The Kid Laroi	undisclosed	SAFE
2	Toad in the Hole	"It Must Have Been Love" by Roxette	Macy Gray	OUT

=== Episode 4 (18 January) ===
Theme: Superheroes

- Group number: "Titanium" by David Guetta & Sia
- Guest panelist: Tom Daley

Performances on the fourth episode
#	Stage name	Song	Result	
1	Dressed Crab	"Let's Groove" by Earth, Wind & Fire	RISK	
2	Tattoo	"Human" by The Killers	RISK	
3	Teeth	"Houdini" by Dua Lipa	SAFE	
4	Kingfisher	"Iris" by The Goo Goo Dolls	SAFE	
5	Snail	"Rule the World" by Take That	SAFE	
Sing-Off			Identity	Result
1	Dressed Crab	"Drift Away" by Mike Berry	undisclosed	SAFE
2	Tattoo	"Proud Mary" by Tina Turner	Carol Decker	OUT

=== Episode 5 (25 January) ===
Performances on the fifth episode
#	Stage name	Clue song	Identity	Result
1	Bush	"Our House" by Madness	undisclosed	SAFE
2	Snail	"Hold On" by Wilson Phillips	undisclosed	SAFE
3	Wolf	"The Candy Man" by Sammy Davis Jr.	undisclosed	SAFE
4	Kingfisher	"Luck Be a Lady" from Guys and Dolls	undisclosed	SAFE
5	Dressed Crab	"Are You Gonna Go My Way" by Lenny Kravitz	undisclosed	SAFE
6	Bear	"Tender" by Blur	undisclosed	RISK
7	Teeth	Neighbours theme by Barry Crocker	Mel Giedroyc	OUT
8	Pufferfish	"Lose Control" by Teddy Swims	undisclosed	SAFE

=== Episode 6 (1 February) ===
Performances on the sixth episode
#	Stage name	Song	Identity	Result
1	Pufferfish	"Don't Rain on My Parade" from Funny Girl	undisclosed	RISK
2	Kingfisher	"Somethin' Stupid" by Frank Sinatra and Nancy Sinatra	Grayson Perry	OUT
3	Bear	"A Bar Song (Tipsy)" by Shaboozey	undisclosed	SAFE
4	Snail	"Dance the Night" by Dua Lipa	Andrea Corr	OUT
5	Wolf	"Birds of a Feather" by Billie Eilish	undisclosed	SAFE
6	Dressed Crab	"California Dreamin’" by The Mamas & the Papas	undisclosed	SAFE
7	Bush	"A Night to Remember" by Shalamar	undisclosed	SAFE

=== Episode 7: Semi-final (8 February) ===
- Guest panelist: Richard E. Grant (in place of Mo Gilligan)

First performances on the seventh episode
#	Stage name	Song	Identity	Result
1	Wolf	"Rebel Yell" by Billy Idol	undisclosed	SAFE
2	Bear	"She" by Elvis Costello	Example	OUT
3	Bush	"Thank You for the Music" by ABBA	undisclosed	SAFE
4	Dressed Crab	"Suddenly" by Billy Ocean	undisclosed	SAFE
5	Pufferfish	"What Was I Made For?" by Billie Eilish	undisclosed	SAFE

Second performances on the seventh episode
#	Stage name	Song	Identity	Result
1	Dressed Crab	"Hit the Road Jack" by Ray Charles	undisclosed	SAFE
2	Bush	"Stay (I Missed You)" by Lisa Loeb	Natalie Cassidy	OUT
3	Wolf	"Don’t Dream It’s Over" by Crowded House	undisclosed	SAFE
4	Pufferfish	"One Night Only" from Dreamgirls	undisclosed	SAFE

=== Episode 8: Final (15 February) ===
- Guest performance: Joel Dommett, the panel, and Danny Jones perform "One Way or Another" by Blondie
- Guest panelist: Danny Jones (in place of Mo Gilligan)

First performances on the eighth episode
#	Stage name	Song
1	Wolf	"Poker Face" by Lady Gaga
2	Pufferfish	"...Baby One More Time" by Britney Spears
3	Dressed Crab	"Ain't No Sunshine" by Bill Withers

Second performances on the eighth episode
#	Stage name	Song	Duet partner	Identity	Result
1	Wolf	"With You I'm Born Again" by Billy Preston & Syreeta Wright	Claire Richards (Knitting)	Marti Pellow	THIRD PLACE
2	Pufferfish	"Total Eclipse of the Heart" by Bonnie Tyler	Danny Jones (Piranha)	undisclosed	SAFE
3	Dressed Crab	"Ain't No Mountain High Enough" by Marvin Gaye & Tammi Terrell	Keala Settle (Air Fryer)	undisclosed	SAFE

- After being unmasked, Pellow sang "Love Is All Around" by Wet Wet Wet as his encore performance.

Third performances on the eighth episode
#	Stage name	Song of the series	Identity	Result
1	Pufferfish	"One Night Only" from Dreamgirls	Samantha Barks	WINNER
2	Dressed Crab	"Are You Gonna Go My Way" by Lenny Kravitz	Gregory Porter	RUNNER-UP

== Ratings ==
Official ratings are taken from BARB, utilising the four-screen dashboard which includes viewers who watched the programme on laptops, smartphones, and tablets within 7 days of the original broadcast.

Episode	Date	Official 7 day rating (millions)	Weekly rank for ITV	Weekly rank for all UK TV
1	4 January	4.87	4	12
2	5 January	4.55	6	18
3	11 January	4.62	5	14
4	18 January	4.13	6	16
5	25 January	3.96	10	28
6	1 February	4.19	5	13
7	8 February	4.31	7	14
8	15 February	4.43	5	8
Series average	2025	4.38	—N/a	
