= Harriet Rose =

English radio presenter (born 1989)

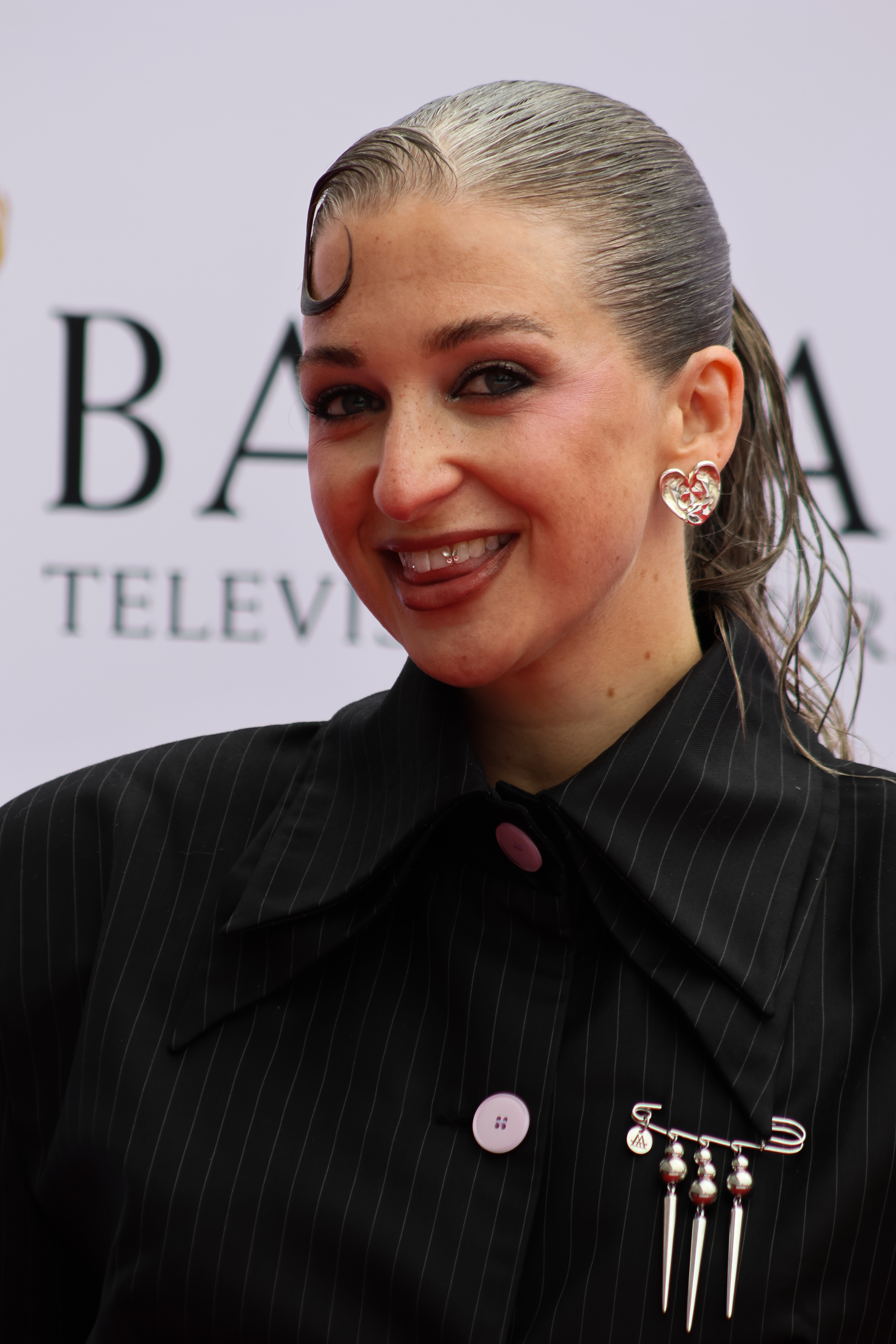
- Rose at the BAFTA Television Awards 2026
- Born: 8 August 1989 (age 36); West Midlands, England
- Occupations: Radio and television presenter
- Employers: Kiss; ITV
- Television: Big Brother: Late & Live; The Masked Singer: The After Mask

Harriet Rose (born 8 August 1989) is an English radio and television presenter, known for presenting various shows on the radio stations FUBAR Radio and Kiss. She has also appeared as a guest on Big Brother: Late & Live in 2024, and presented The Masked Singer: The After Mask in 2025.

== Life and career ==
Harriet Rose was born on 8 August 1989. She was raised in the West Midlands. At age 19, she moved to London, living in areas such as New Cross and Bromley, before moving to live in Walthamstow Village. She presented on FUBAR Radio, before moving to Kiss. In September 2020, she joined KISS Breakfast alongside Diversity's Ashley Banjo and Perri Kiely, and has since gone on to present Kisstory.

Rose has also presented programmes for MTV, as well as online programme's BUILD Series LDN, Beat the Street and Planet Date. In 2021, she hosted the backstage digital show for the MTV Europe Music Awards. In 2024, Rose served as a celebrity house guest on Big Brother: Late & Live. In 2025, Rose began presenting The Masked Singer: The After Mask, a digital spin-off of The Masked Singer. Rose is a lesbian. She organises and hosts the annual event GAY4U, a queer club event in London.

== Filmography ==
As herself
Year	Title	Role	Ref.
2023–2025	Big Brother: Late & Live	Guest	
2023	Pointless Celebrities	Contestant	
2024	The Masked Singer: The After Mask	Presenter	
