= The Masked Dancer (British TV series) series 1 =

Season of television series

The Masked Dancer
- Series 1
- Starring: Mo Gilligan; Davina McCall; Oti Mabuse; Jonathan Ross
- Hosted by: Joel Dommett
- No. of contestants: 12
- Winner: Louis Smith as "Carwash"
- Runner-up: Bonnie Langford as "Squirrel"
- No. of episodes: 7

Release
- Original network: ITV
- Original release: 29 May – 5 June 2021

Series chronology
- Next → Series 2

The first series of the British version of The Masked Dancer premiered on ITV on 29 May 2021, and concluded on 5 June 2021. The series was won by Olympic gymnast Louis Smith as "Carwash", with actress/dancer Bonnie Langford finishing second as "Squirrel", and singer Howard Donald placing third as "Zip".

== Production ==
On 4 March 2021, it was announced that ITV were producing a local version of the American television dancing competition The Masked Dancer following the success of its sister show The Masked Singer. The series consisted of 12 contestants competing through seven episodes. The series was commissioned as a replacement in the spring schedule for Britain's Got Talent, which had its upcoming fifteenth series postponed until 2022 due to health and safety concerns surrounding the COVID-19 pandemic. The show premiered on 29 May 2021.

== Panellists and host ==
Series 1 panellists and host

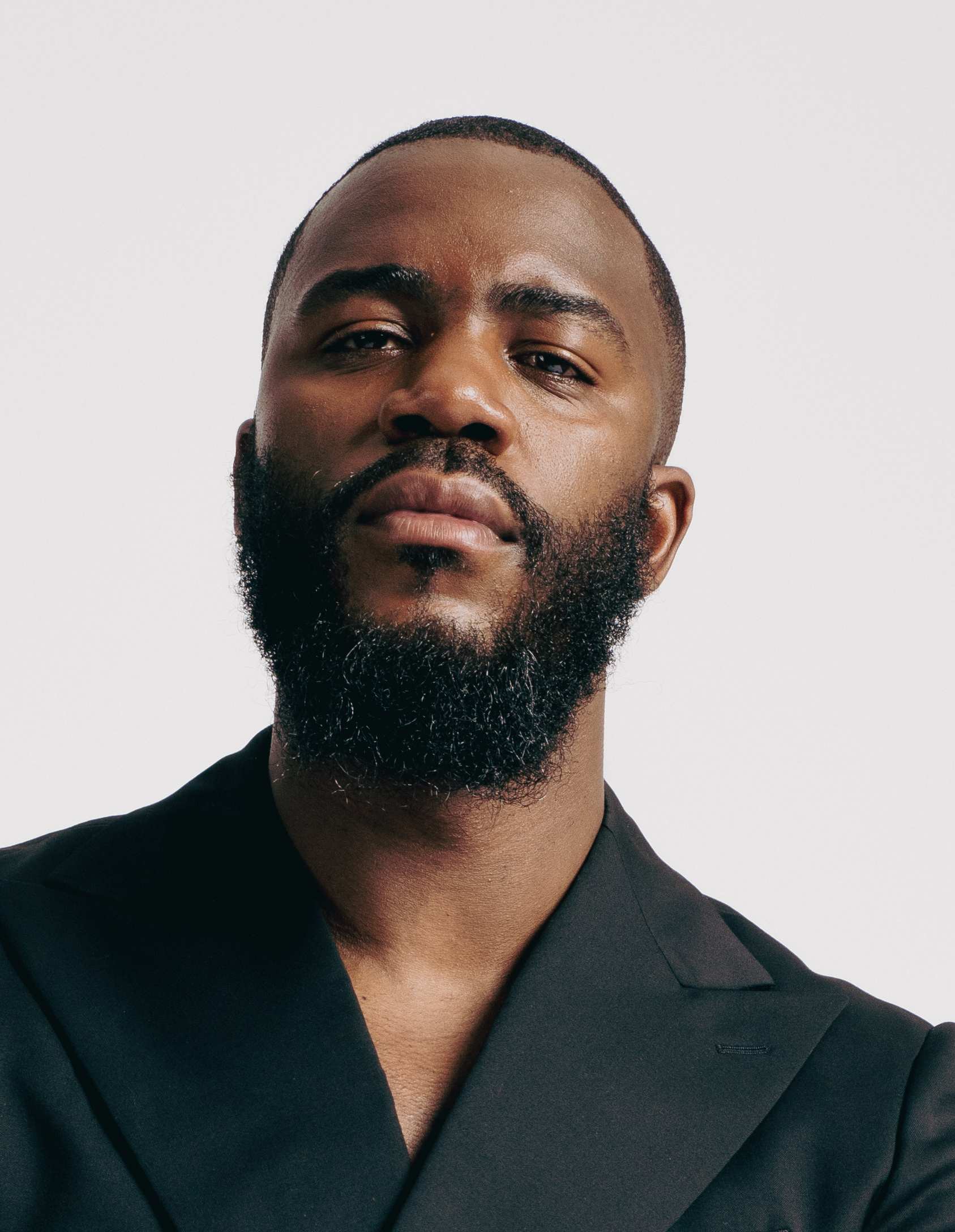
Mo Gilligan

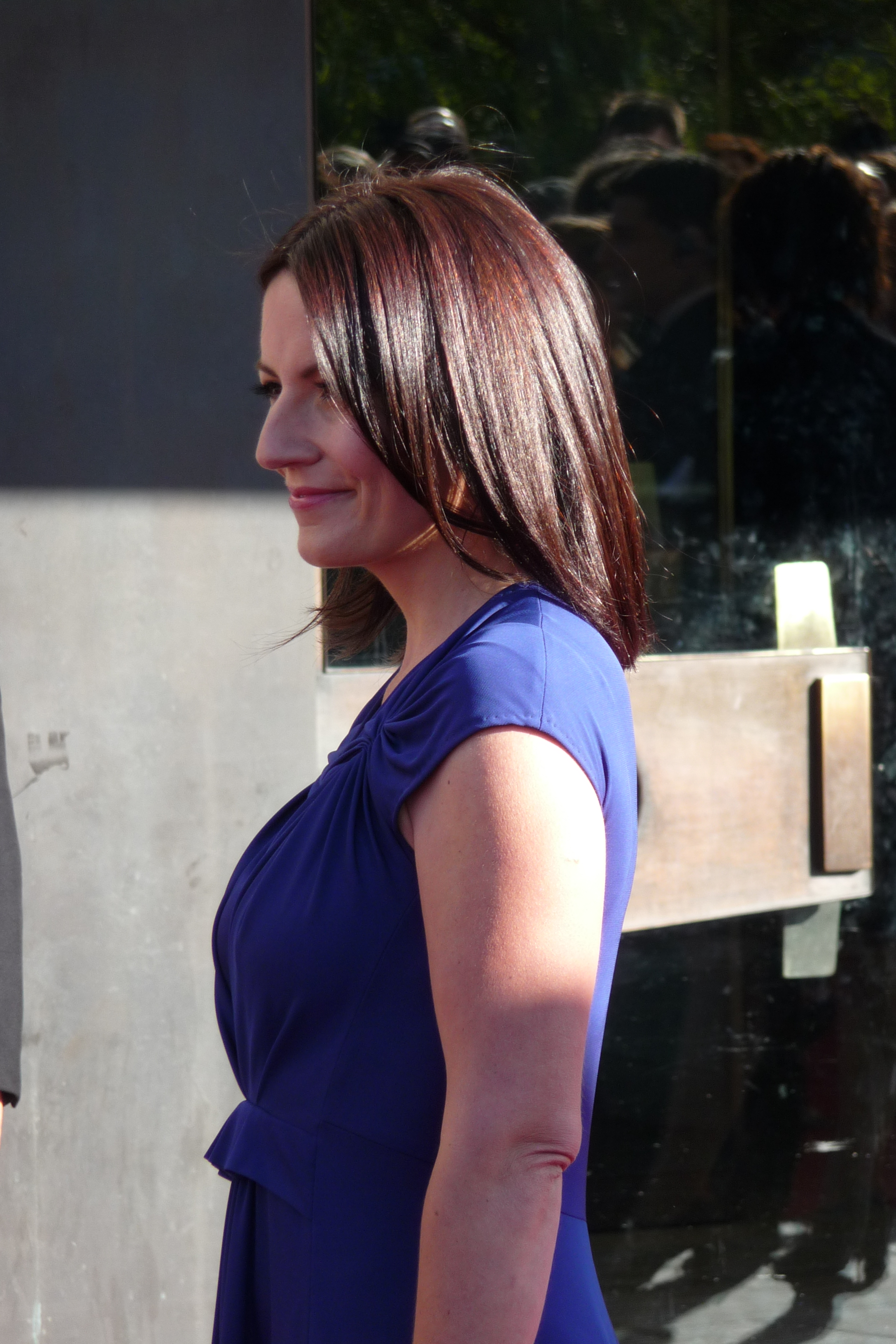
Davina McCall

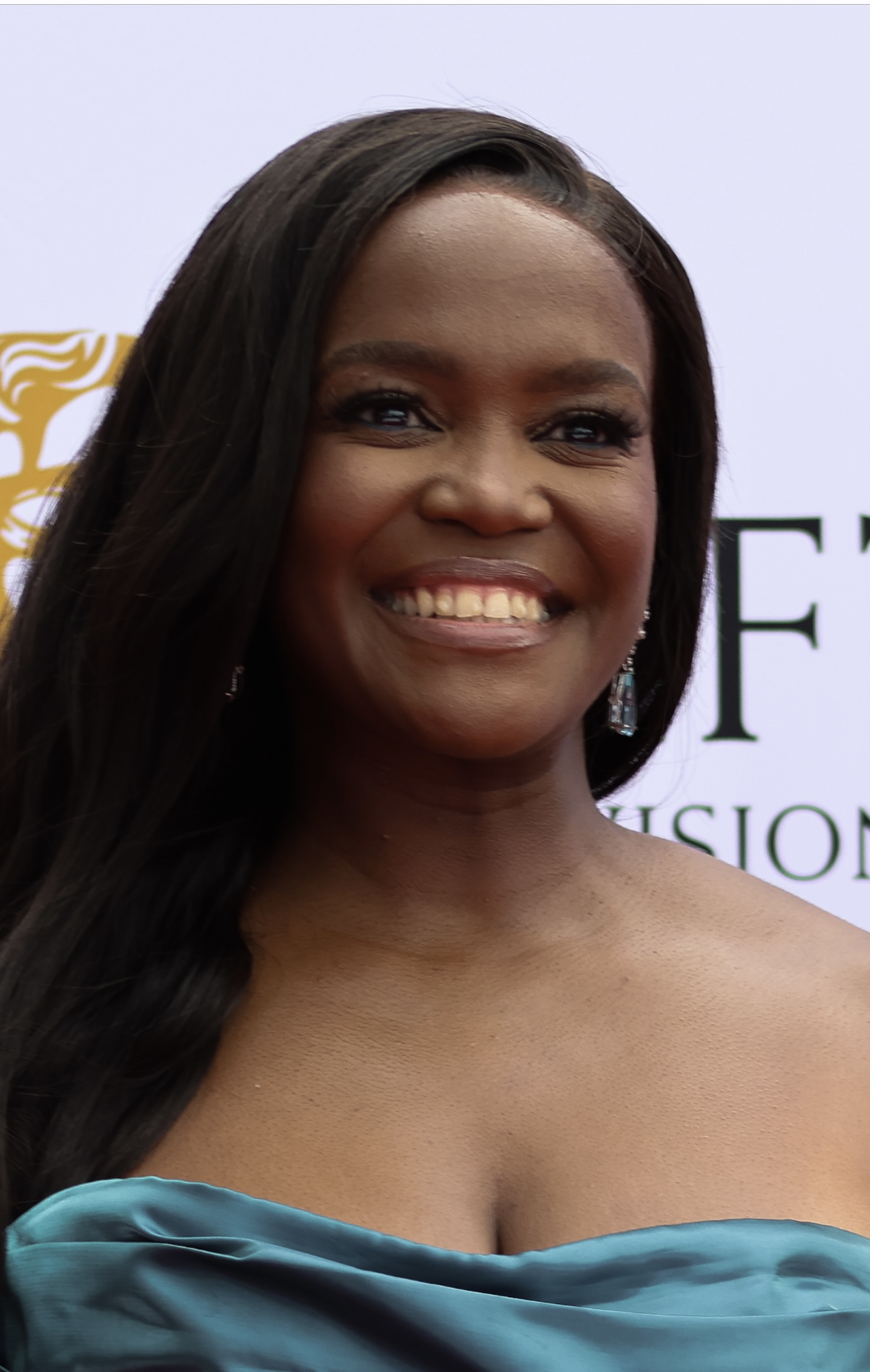
Oti Mabuse

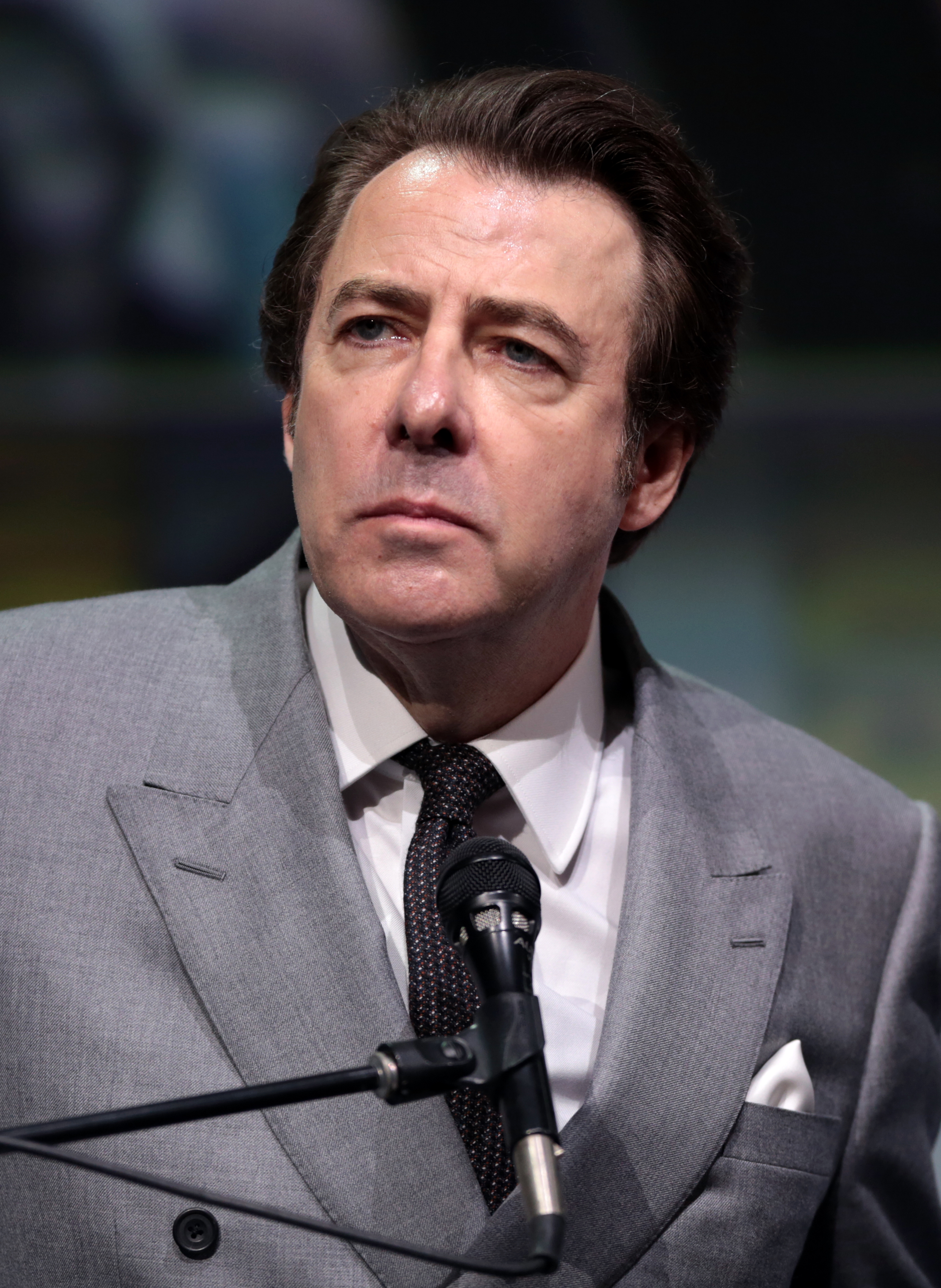
Jonathan Ross

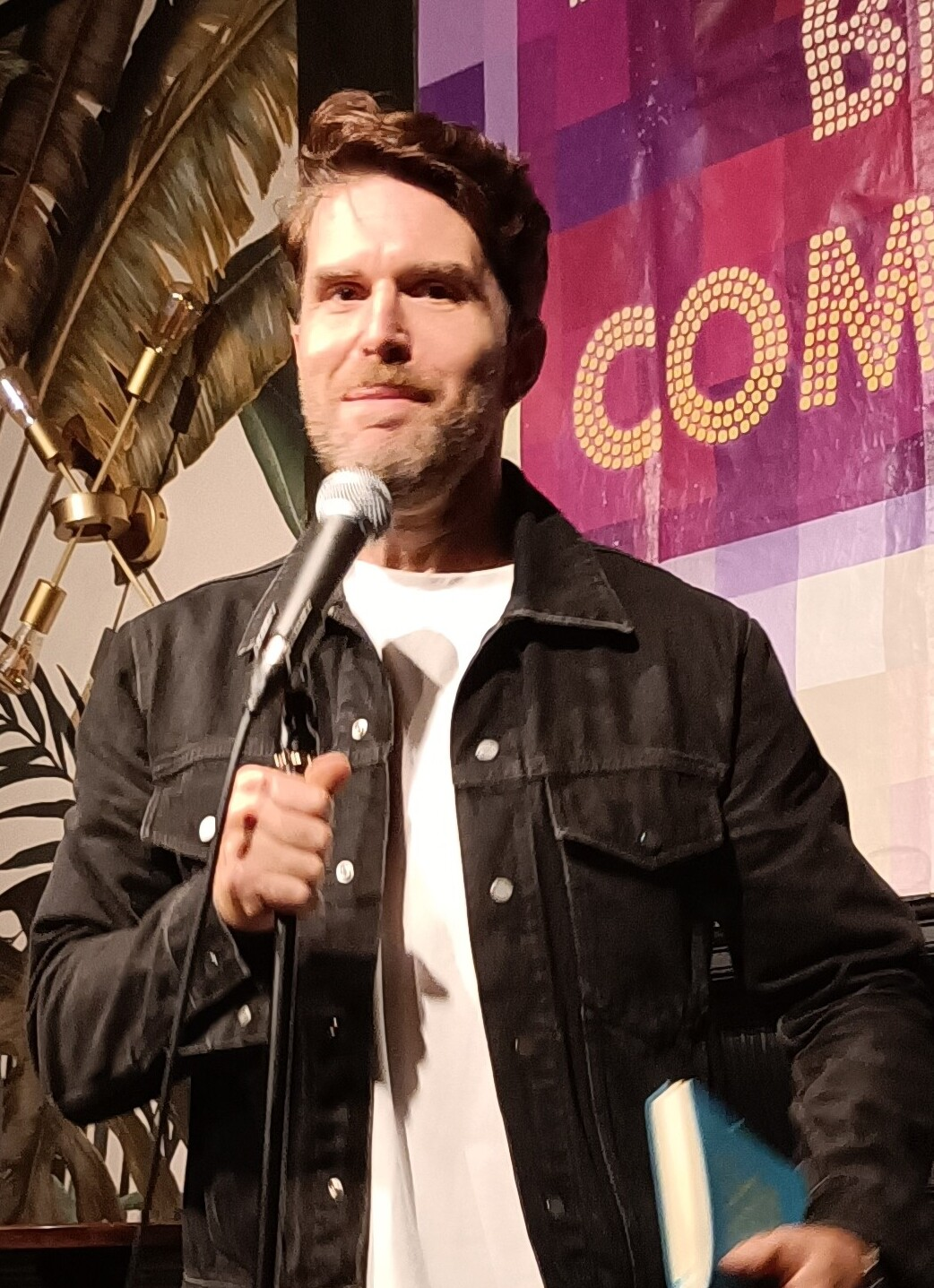
Joel Dommett

Following the announcement of the series, it was confirmed by ITV that the panel would consist of presenter and comedian Jonathan Ross, television presenter Davina McCall, and comedian Mo Gilligan, who are all panellists on The Masked Singer, along with Strictly Come Dancing professional Oti Mabuse. It was also confirmed that Joel Dommett would host the show.

Guest panellists included David Walliams in the fifth episode, John Bishop in the sixth episode, and Holly Willoughby in the seventh episode.

== Contestants ==
One of the shows sponsors, Lidl, had a product placement mask known as "Goose", who was unmasked to be Love Island winner Dani Dyer.

Results
Stage name	Celebrity	Occupation(s)	Episodes						
Stage name	Celebrity	Occupation(s)	1	2	3	4	5	6	7
Peacock	Louis Smith	Olympic gymnast		WIN		SAFE	SAFE	RISK	WINNER
Princess	Bonnie Langford	Actress/dancer		RISK		SAFE	SAFE	SAFE	RUNNER-UP
Party Animal	Howard Donald	Singer	WIN		SAFE		RISK	SAFE	THIRD
Dachshund	Tamzin Outhwaite	Actress	WIN		SAFE		SAFE	SAFE	OUT
Koala	Kelly Brook	Model/actress		RISK		RISK	SAFE	OUT	
Rainbow Milkshake	Craig Revel Horwood	Dancer/TV judge	RISK		RISK		SAFE	OUT	
Shaggy Sheepdog	Zoe Ball	DJ/TV presenter	WIN		SAFE		OUT		
Carrot	Christopher Dean	Olympic ice dancer		WIN		SAFE	OUT		
Bumblebee	Eddie the Eagle	Olympic ski-jumper		WIN		OUT			
Pom Pom Pomeranian	Dita Von Teese	Burlesque dancer	RISK		OUT				
Hornbill	Louise Redknapp	Singer		OUT					
Avocado	Jordan Banjo	Dancer	OUT						

The masked dancer won their face-off and remained in the competition.
The masked dancer was safe from elimination.
The masked dancer was in the bottom three/two, but was not eliminated.
The masked dancer was eliminated from the competition and unmasked upon their elimination.
The masked dancer did not perform.
The masked dancer won the competition.
The masked dancer finished second.
The masked dancer finished third.
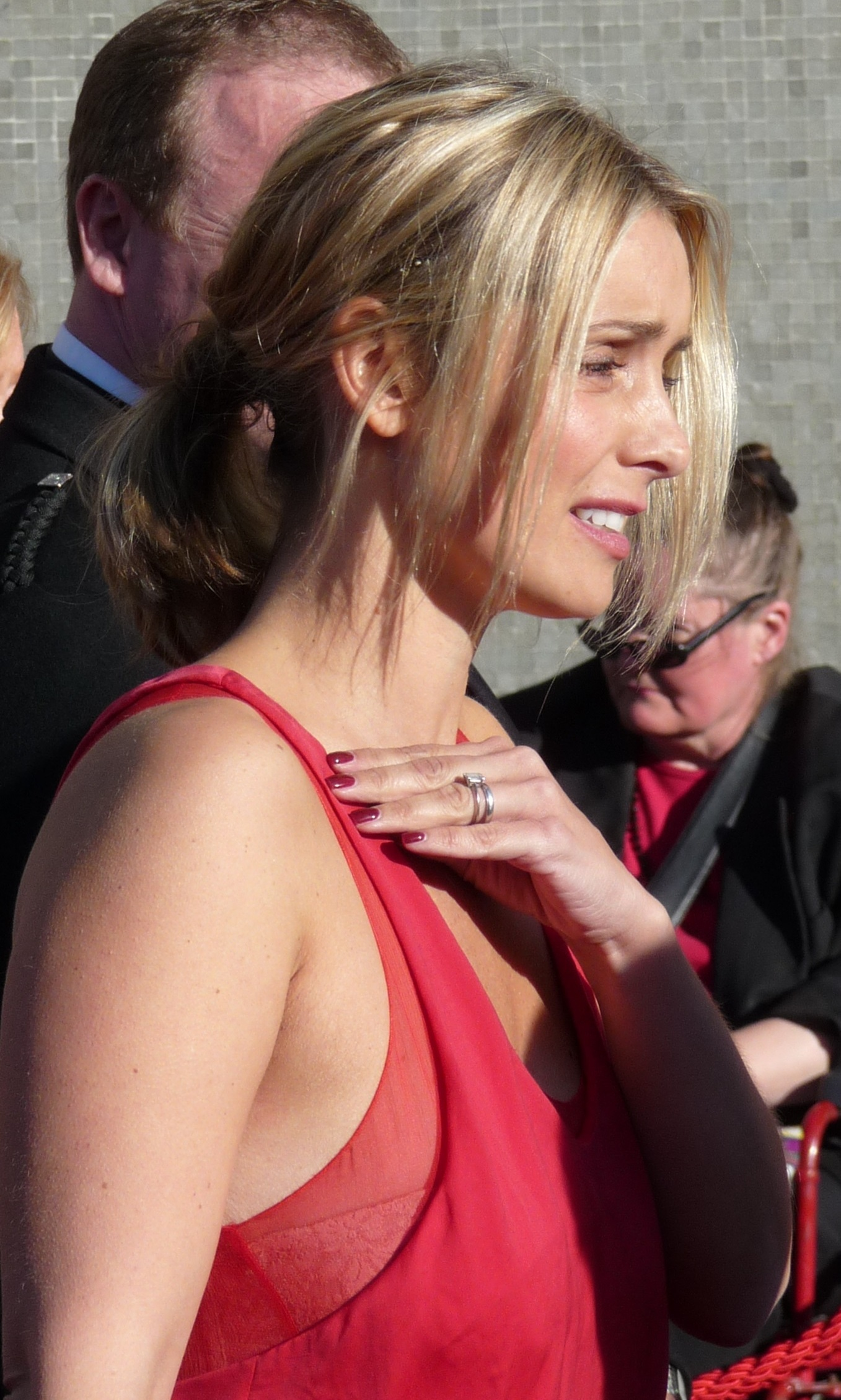
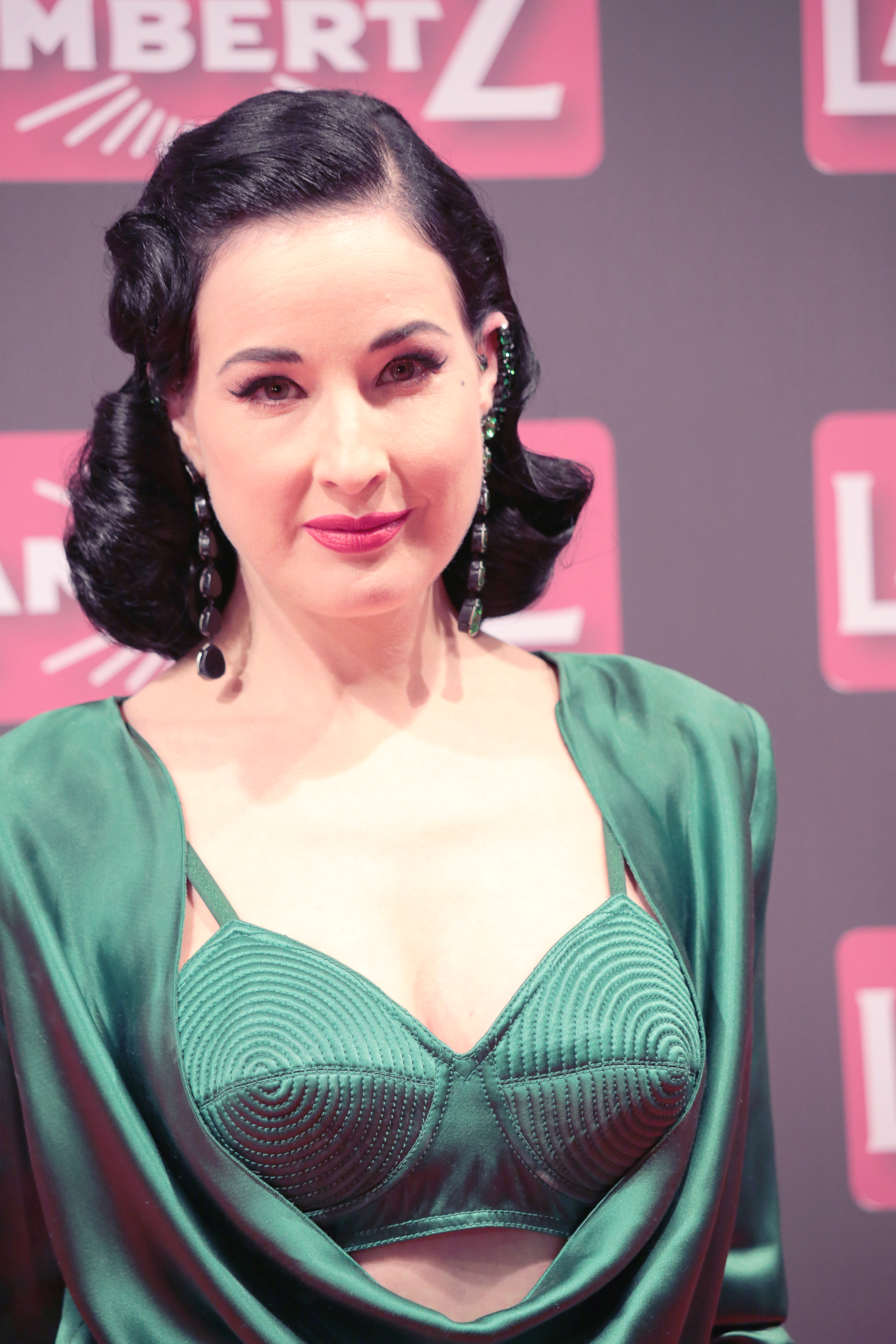
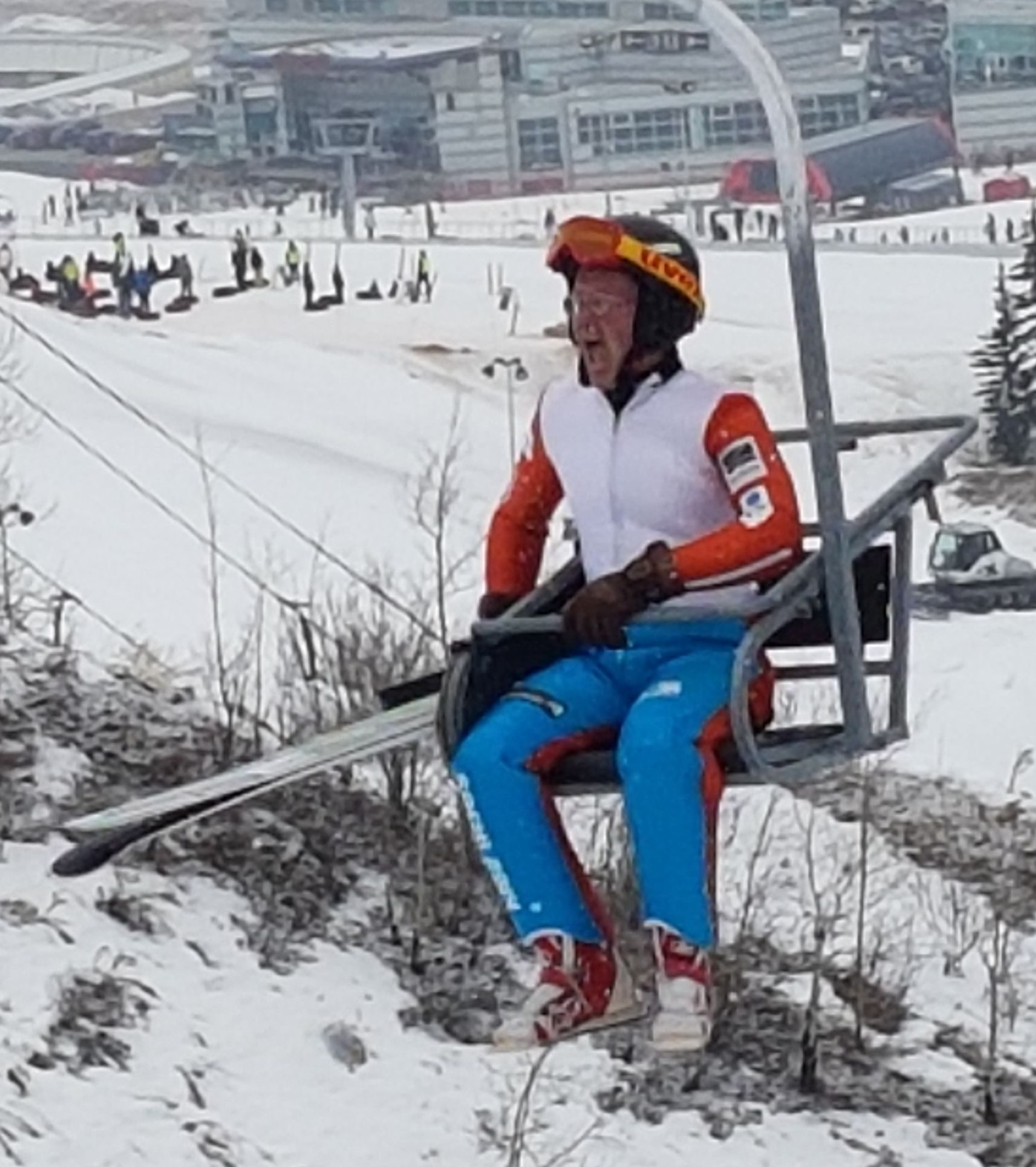
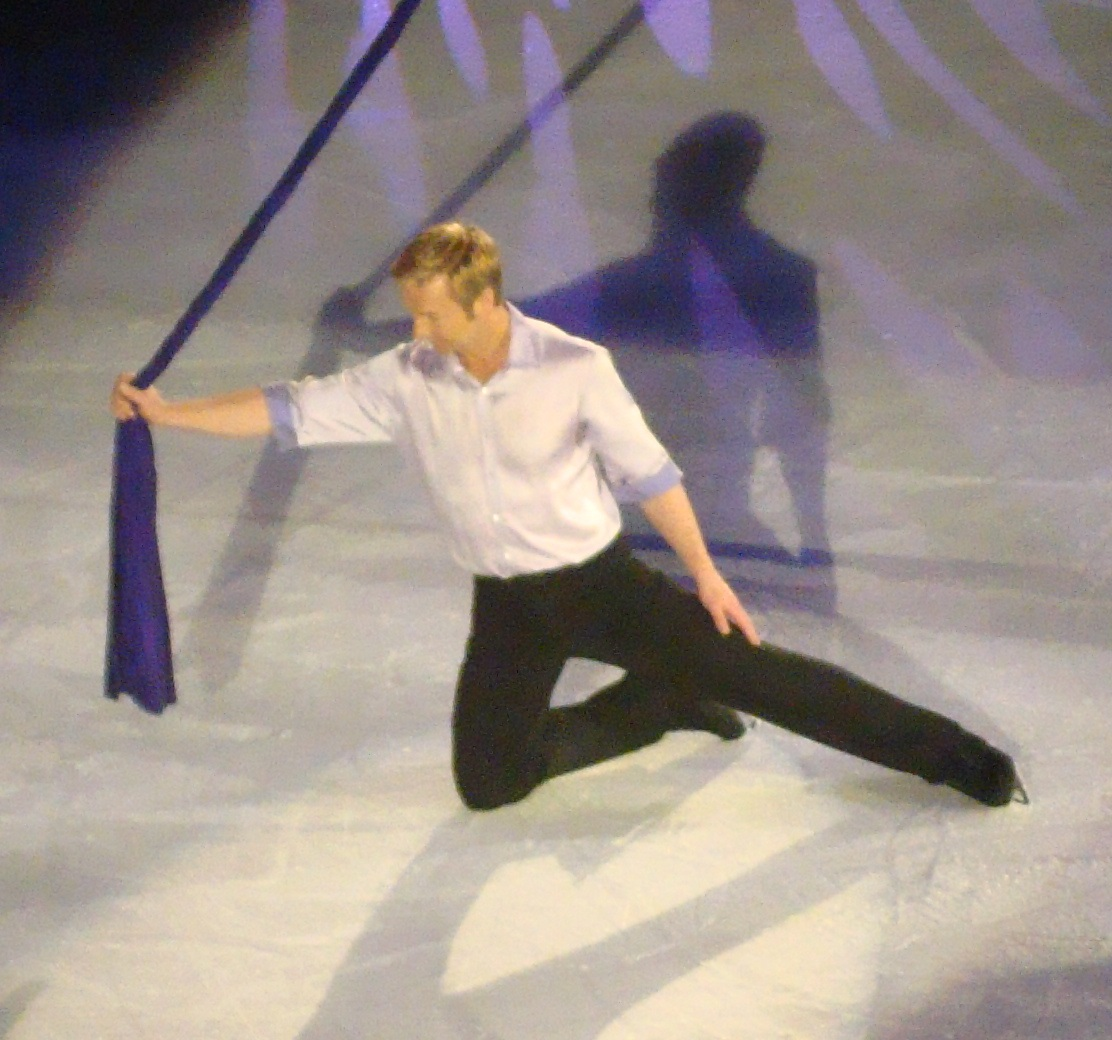
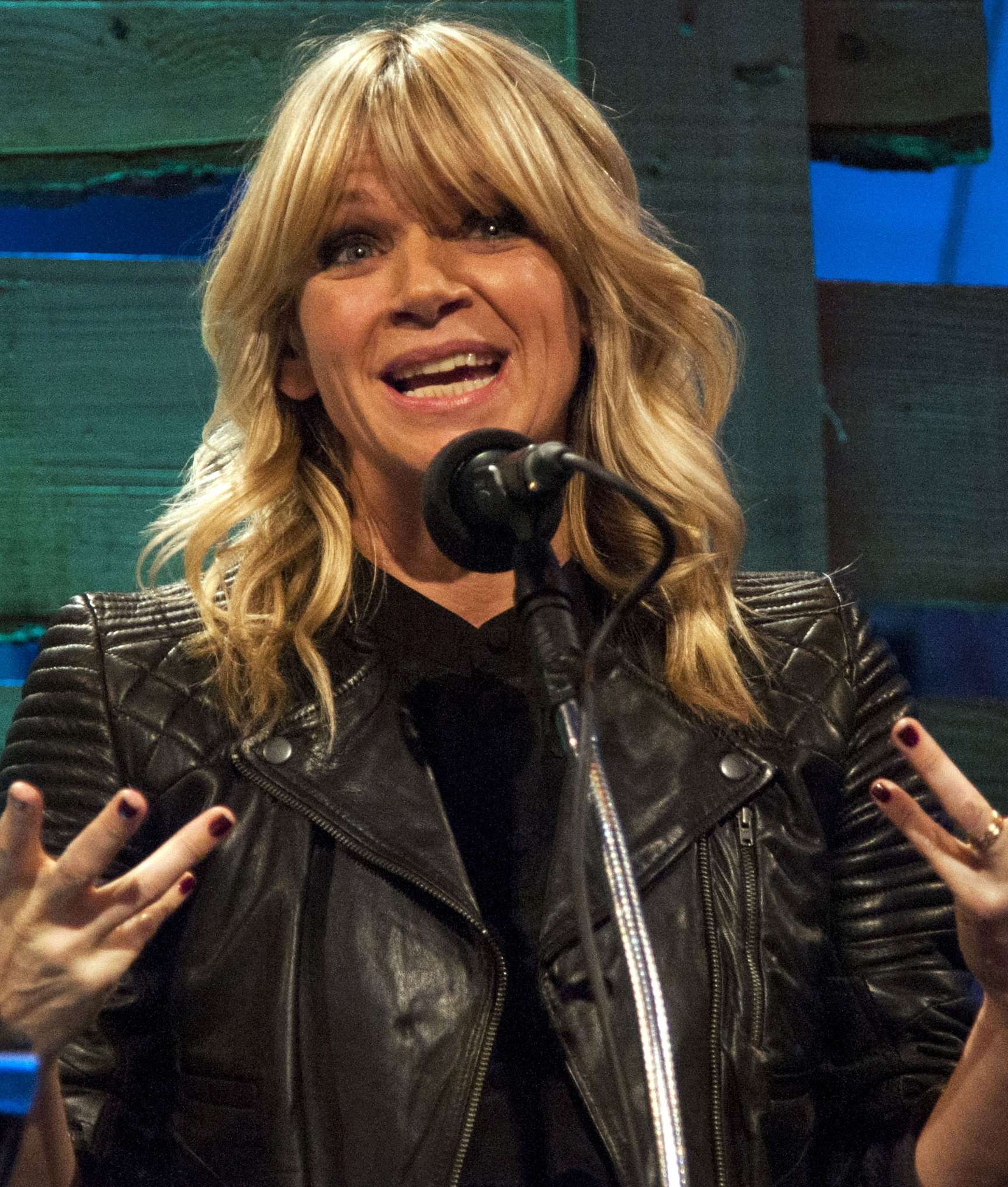
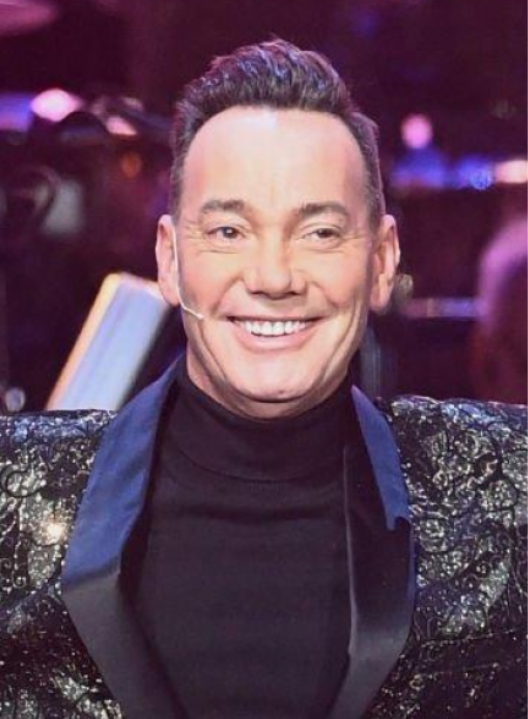
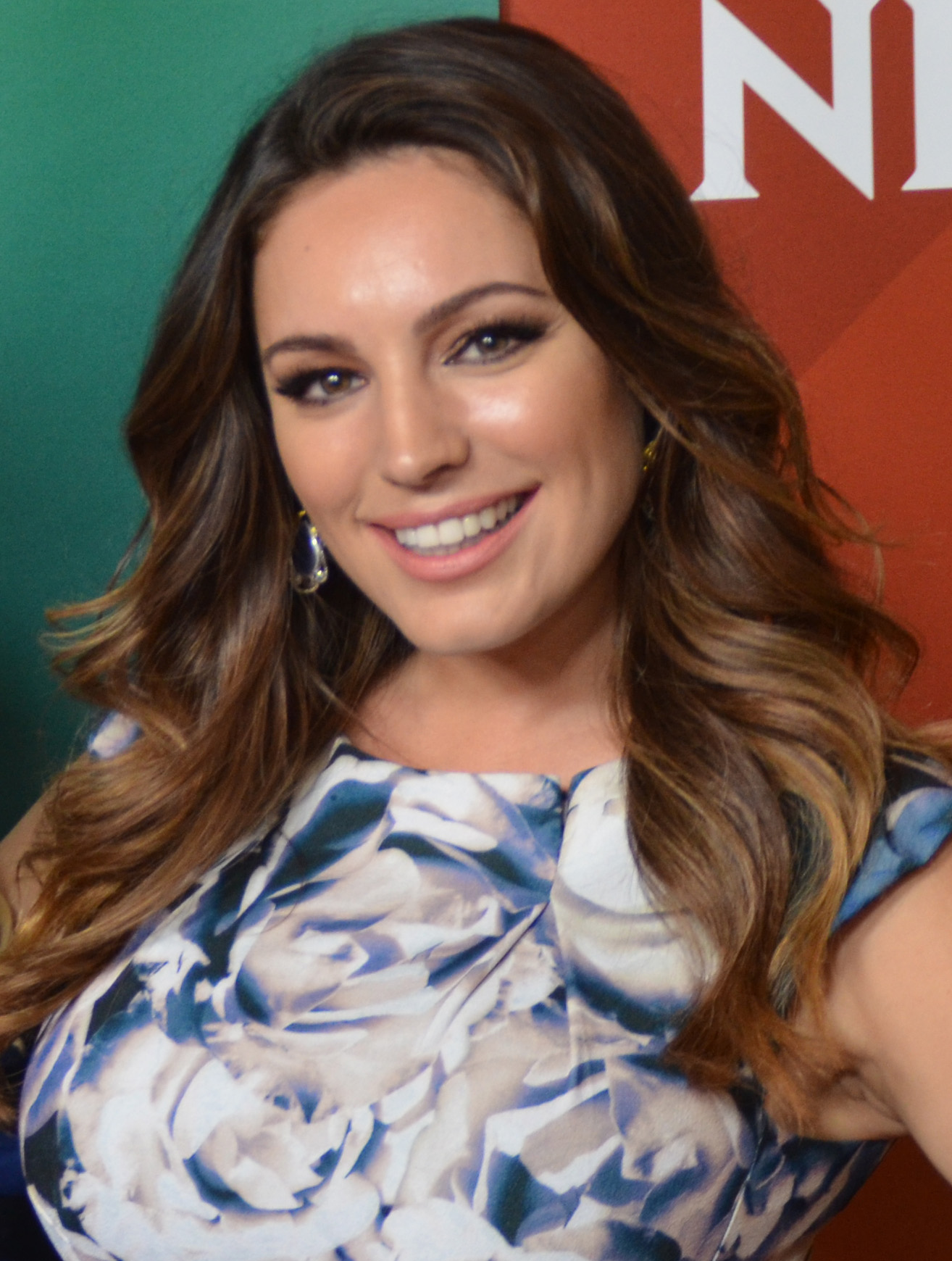
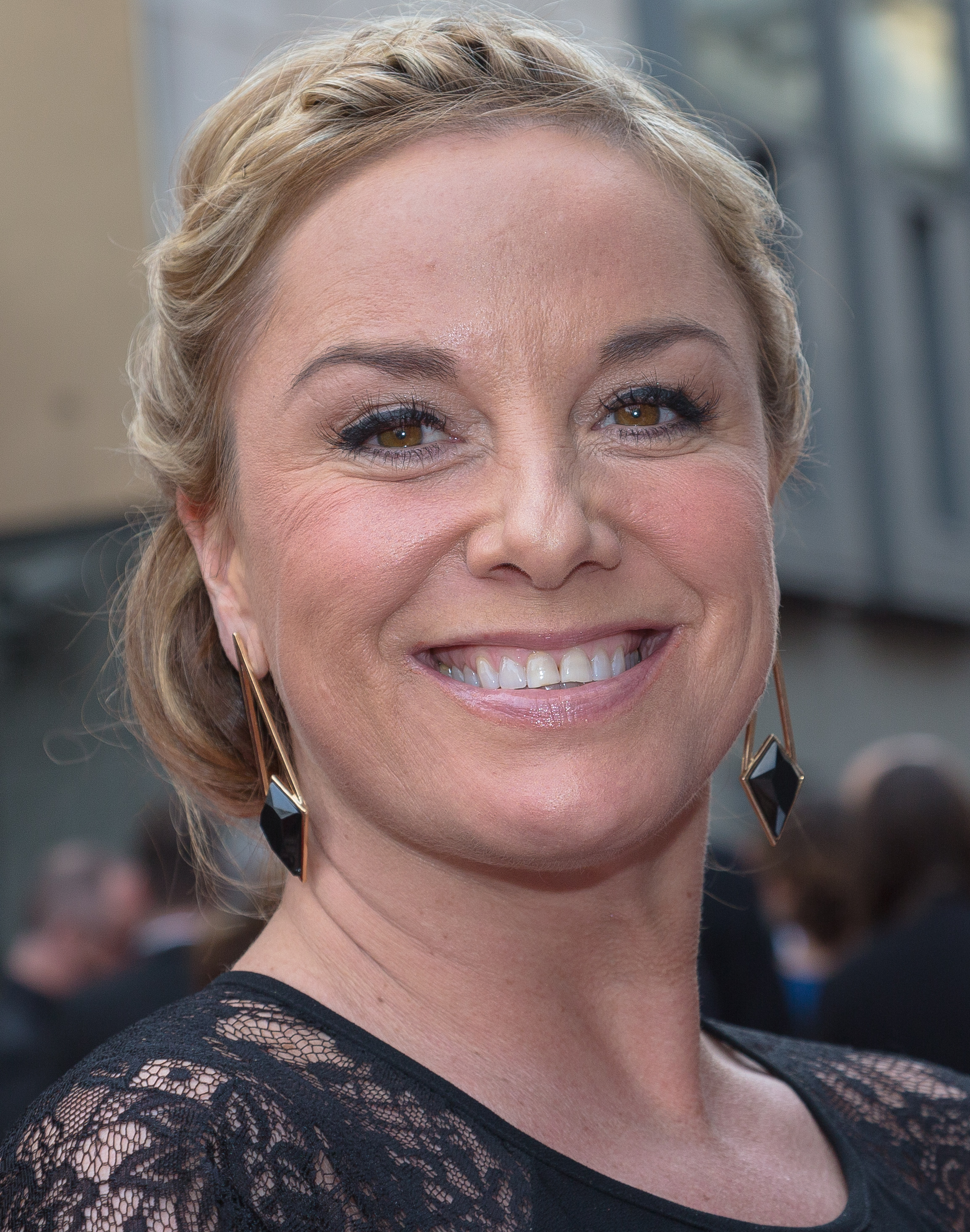
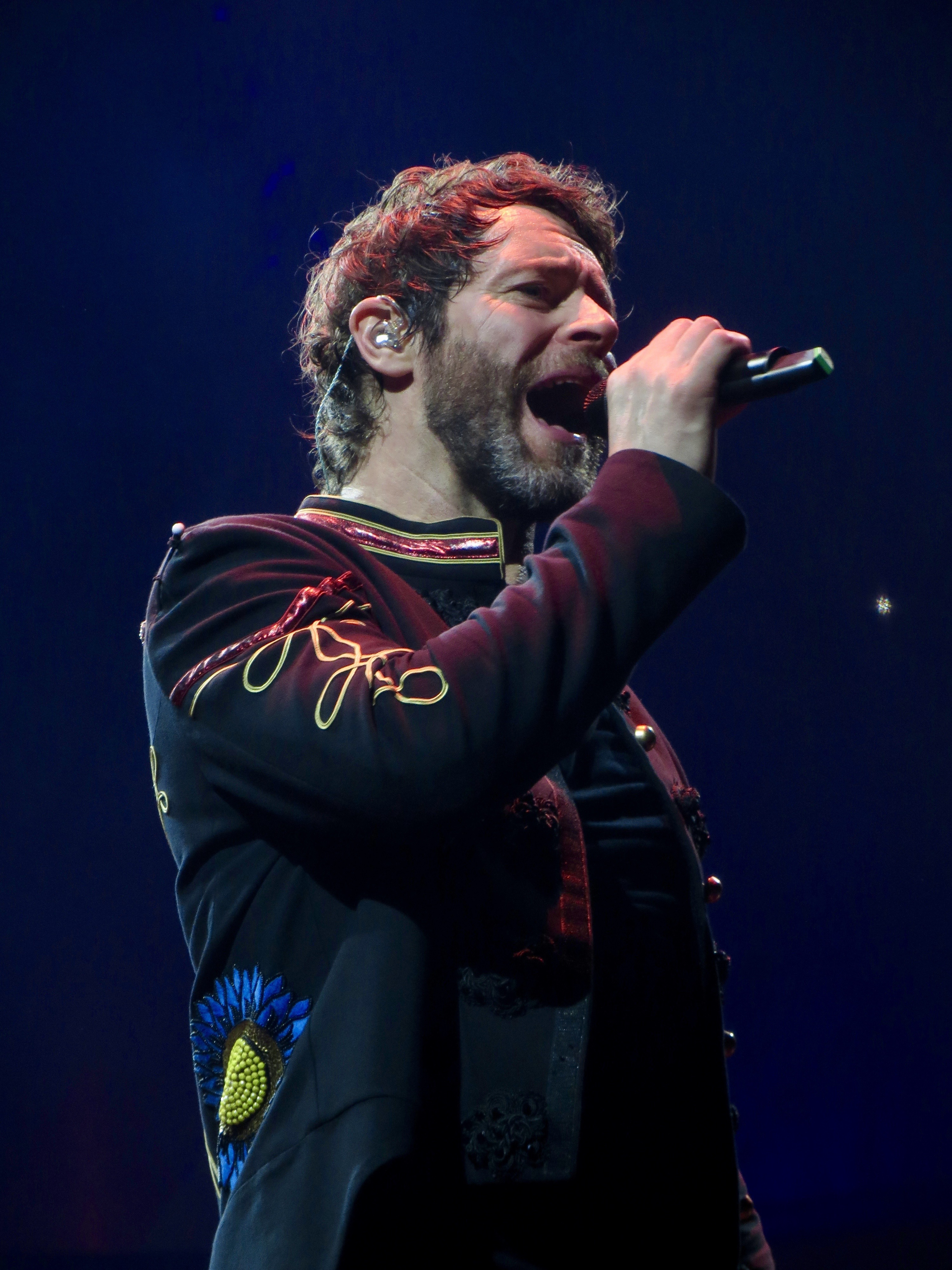
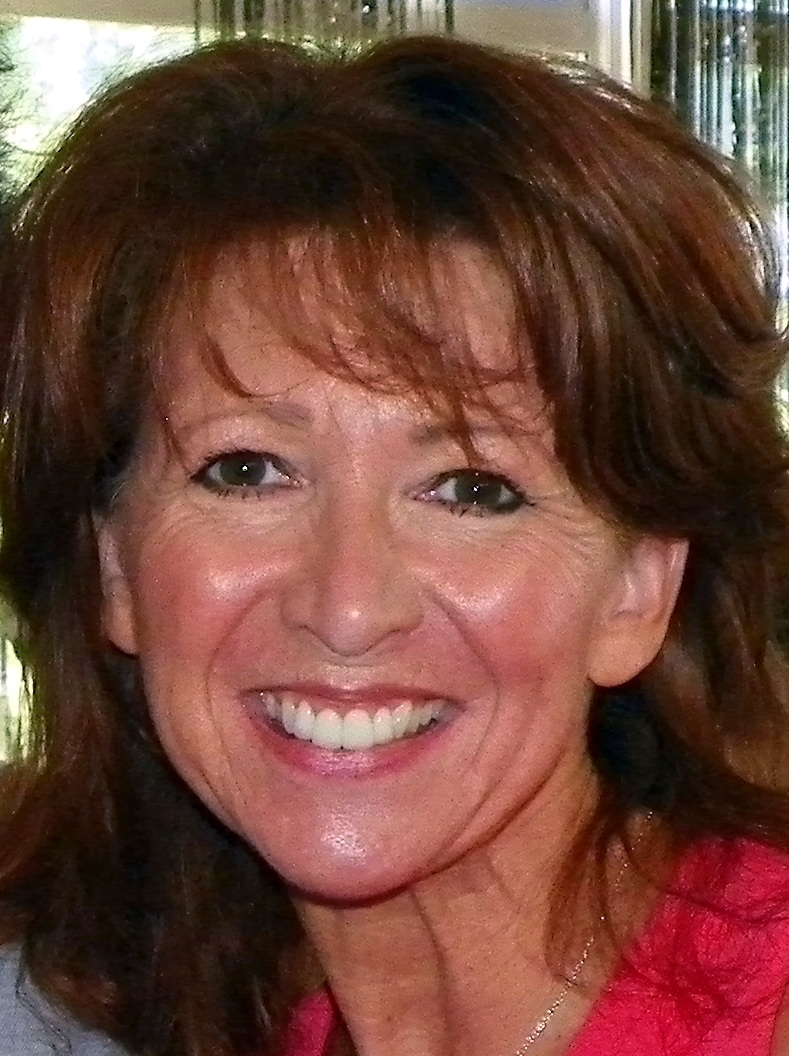
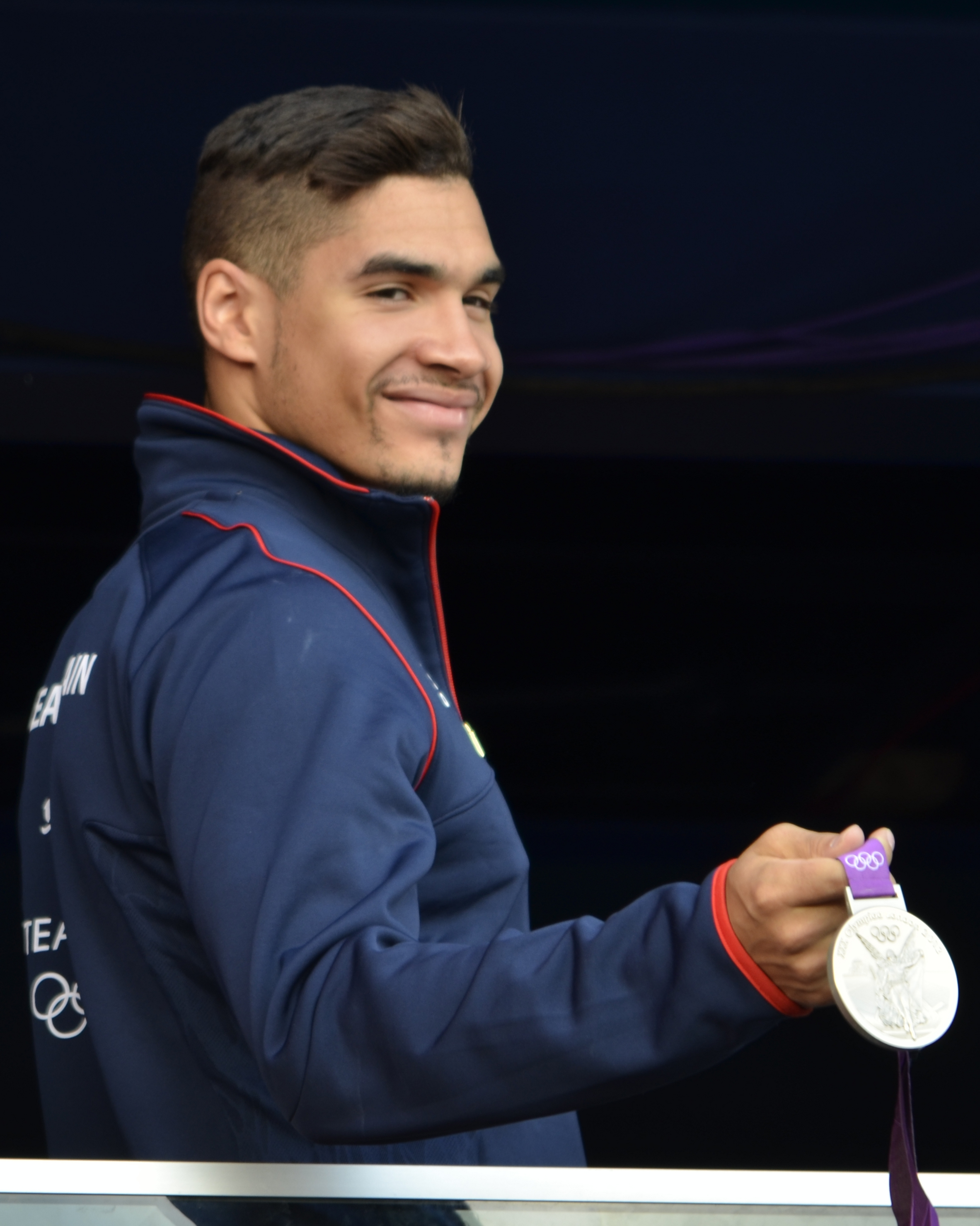
The celebrities who competed in the first series of The Masked Dancer, pictured in order of elimination (L–R):

Louise Redknapp ("Flamingo"), Dita Von Teese ("Beetroot"), Eddie the Eagle ("Rubber Chicken"), Christopher Dean ("Beagle"), Zoe Ball ("Llama"), Craig Revel Horwood ("Knickerbocker Glory"), Kelly Brook ("Frog"), Tamzin Outhwaite ("Scarecrow"), Howard Donald ("Zip"), Bonnie Langford ("Squirrel"), and Louis Smith ("Carwash")

Not pictured: Jordan Banjo ("Viper")

== Episodes ==
=== Episode 1 (29 May) ===
Performances on the first episode
#	Stage name	Song	Identity	Result
1	Party Animal	"Rapper's Delight" by The Sugarhill Gang/"Good Times" by Chic	undisclosed	WIN
2	Rainbow Milkshake	"Telephone" by Lady Gaga & Beyoncé	undisclosed	RISK
3	Pom Pom Pomeranian	"I Put a Spell on You" by Annie Lennox	undisclosed	RISK
4	Shaggy Sheepdog	"Soul Bossa Nova" by Quincy Jones	undisclosed	WIN
5	Avocado	"Are You Gonna Go My Way" by Lenny Kravitz	Jordan Banjo	OUT
6	Dachshund	"September" by Justin Timberlake & Anna Kendrick	undisclosed	WIN

=== Episode 2 (30 May) ===
Performances on the second episode
#	Stage name	Song	Identity	Result
1	Princess	"Shake It Off" by Taylor Swift	undisclosed	RISK
2	Peacock	"Car Wash" by Christina Aguilera feat. Missy Elliott	undisclosed	WIN
3	Hornbill	"Lady Marmalade" by Christina Aguilera, Lil' Kim, Mýa, Pink & Missy Elliott	Louise Redknapp	OUT
4	Bumblebee	"Hippy Hippy Shake" by The Swinging Blue Jeans	undisclosed	WIN
5	Koala	"Boom! Shake the Room" by DJ Jazzy Jeff & Fresh Prince	undisclosed	RISK
6	Carrot	"Bang Bang" by will.i.am	undisclosed	WIN

=== Episode 3 (31 May) ===
Performances on the third episode
#	Stage name	Song	Result	
1	Rainbow Milkshake	"All That Jazz" by Liza Minnelli	RISK	
2	Shaggy Sheepdog	"Bad Guy" by Billie Eilish	SAFE	
3	Dachshund	"Timber" by Pitbull feat. Kesha	SAFE	
4	Pom Pom Pomeranian	"It's My Party" by Lesley Gore	RISK	
5	Party Animal	"Jungle Boogie" by Kool & the Gang	SAFE	
Dance-Off			Identity	Result
1	Rainbow Milkshake	"I'm So Excited" by The Pointer Sisters	undisclosed	SAFE
2	Pom Pom Pomeranian	"Ex's & Oh's" by Elle King	Dita Von Teese	OUT

=== Episode 4 (1 June) ===
Performances on the fourth episode
#	Stage name	Song	Result	
1	Peacock	"You're the One That I Want"/"Greased Lightnin'"/"Born to Hand Jive" from Grease	SAFE	
2	Bumblebee	"Mambo No. 5 (A Little Bit of...)" by Lou Bega	RISK	
3	Koala	"Somewhere Over the Rainbow" by Israel Kamakawiwoʻole	RISK	
4	Carrot	"Hound Dog" by Elvis Presley	SAFE	
5	Princess	"Single Ladies (Put a Ring on It)" by Beyoncé	SAFE	
Dance-Off			Identity	Result
1	Bumblebee	"Take a Chance on Me" by ABBA	Eddie the Eagle	OUT
2	Koala	"Hey Ya!" by Outkast	undisclosed	SAFE

=== Episode 5 (3 June) ===
- Guest panelist: David Walliams

Performances on the fifth episode
#	Stage name	Song	Identity	Result
1	Koala	"Little Shop of Horrors" from Little Shop of Horrors	undisclosed	SAFE
2	Carrot	"Fly Me to the Moon" by Frank Sinatra	Christopher Dean	OUT
3	Peacock	"24K Magic" by Bruno Mars	undisclosed	SAFE
4	Dachshund	"Perfect" by Ed Sheeran	undisclosed	SAFE
5	Princess	"Scream" by Usher	undisclosed	SAFE
6	Party Animal	"A Sky Full of Stars" by Coldplay	undisclosed	RISK
7	Shaggy Sheepdog	"You Never Can Tell" by Chuck Berry	Zoe Ball	OUT
8	Rainbow Milkshake	"Nails, Hair, Hips, Heels" by Todrick Hall	undisclosed	SAFE

=== Episode 6: Semi-final (4 June) ===
- Guest panelist: John Bishop

Performances on the sixth episode
#	Stage name	Song	Identity	Result
1	Peacock	"Singin' in the Rain" from Singin' in the Rain	undisclosed	RISK
2	Koala	"Shout Out to My Ex" by Little Mix	undisclosed	RISK
3	Princess	"Havana" by Camila Cabello feat. Young Thug	undisclosed	SAFE
4	Party Animal	"Use It Up and Wear It Out" by Odyssey	undisclosed	SAFE
5	Rainbow Milkshake	"Despacito" by Luis Fonsi feat. Daddy Yankee/"Shape of You" by Ed Sheeran	Craig Revel Horwood	OUT
6	Dachshund	"Bye Bye Bye" by NSYNC	undisclosed	SAFE
Dance-Off			Identity	Result
1	Peacock	"Move Your Feet" by Junior Senior	undisclosed	SAFE
2	Koala	"One Way or Another" by Blondie	Kelly Brook	OUT

=== Episode 7: Final (5 June) ===
- Group number: "Dancing in the Street" by Marvin Gaye
- Guest panelist: Holly Willoughby

First performances on the seventh episode
#	Stage name	Song	Identity	Result
1	Dachshund	"Come Alive" from The Greatest Showman	Tamzin Outhwaite	OUT
2	Party Animal	"Super Freak" by Rick James	undisclosed	SAFE
3	Princess	"Bang Bang" by Jessie J, Ariana Grande & Nicki Minaj	undisclosed	SAFE
4	Peacock	"Party Rock Anthem" by LMFAO ft. Lauren Bennett & GoonRock	undisclosed	SAFE

Second performances on the seventh episode
#	Stage name	Song	Identity	Result
1	Party Animal	"Rapper's Delight" by The Sugarhill Gang/"Good Times" by Chic	Howard Donald	THIRD PLACE
2	Princess	"Shake It Off" by Taylor Swift	Bonnie Langford	RUNNER-UP
3	Peacock	"You're the One That I Want"/"Greased Lightnin'"/"Born to Hand Jive" from Grease	Louis Smith	WINNER

== Ratings ==
Official ratings are taken from BARB, utilising the four-screen dashboard which includes viewers who watched the programme on laptops, smartphones, and tablets within 28 days of the original broadcast.

Episode	Date	Official 28 day rating (millions)	Weekly rank for ITV
1	29 May	4.02	15
2	30 May	—N/a	Outside top 15
3	31 May	3.67	14
4	1 June	3.41	15
5	3 June	3.75	13
6	4 June	3.98	12
7	5 June	4.65	7
