= The Masked Dancer (British TV series) series 2 =

Season of television series

The Masked Dancer
- Series 2
- Starring: Peter Crouch; Davina McCall; Oti Mabuse; Jonathan Ross
- Hosted by: Joel Dommett
- No. of contestants: 12
- Winner: Heather Morris as "Scissors"
- Runner-up: Adam Garcia as "Onomatopoeia"
- No. of episodes: 8

Release
- Original network: ITV
- Original release: 3 September – 22 October 2022

Series chronology
- ← Previous; Series 1

The second and final series of the British version of The Masked Dancer premiered on ITV on 3 September 2022, and concluded on 22 October 2022. The series was won by actress Heather Morris as "Scissors", with actor Adam Garcia finishing second as "Onomatopoeia", and dancer/choreographer Bruno Tonioli placing third as "Pearly King".

== Production ==
Following the conclusion of the first series in May 2021, Katie Radcliffe, head of entertainment at ITV, stated that the show "may not return for a second series" and that the broadcaster were considering axing a number of shows on the channel, deeming the future of The Masked Dancer uncertain. However, in December 2021, it was confirmed that the show would return for a second series. Filming for the series took place at ITV Studios Bovingdon in May 2022. On 24 August 2022, it was announced that the series would premiere on 3 September.

== Panellists and host ==
Series 2 panellists and host

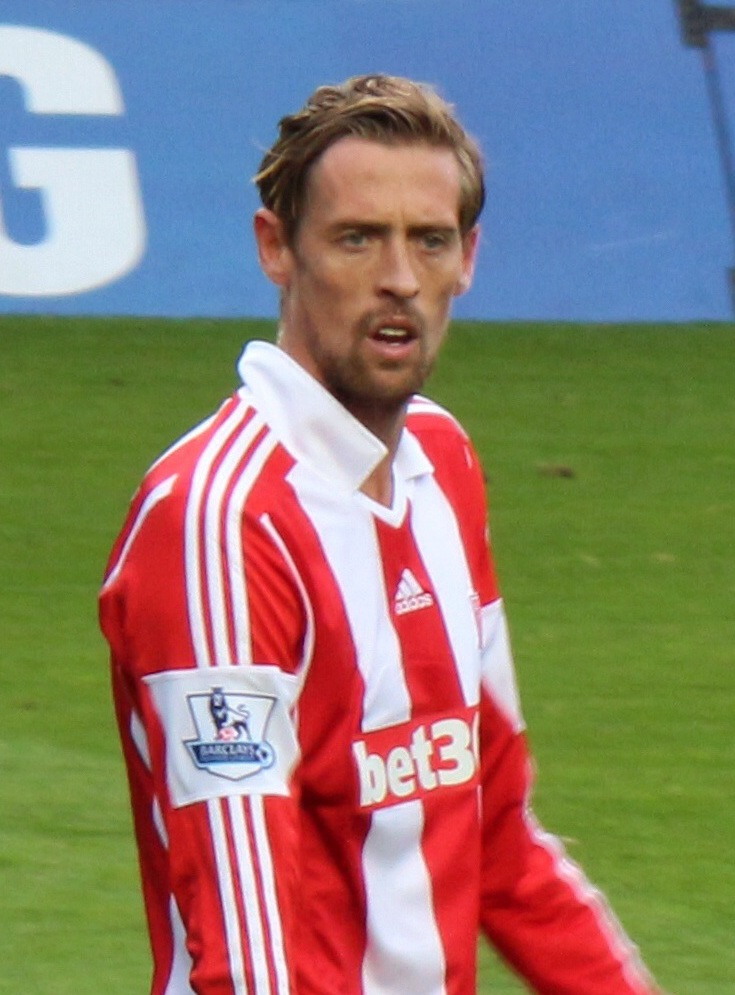
Peter Crouch

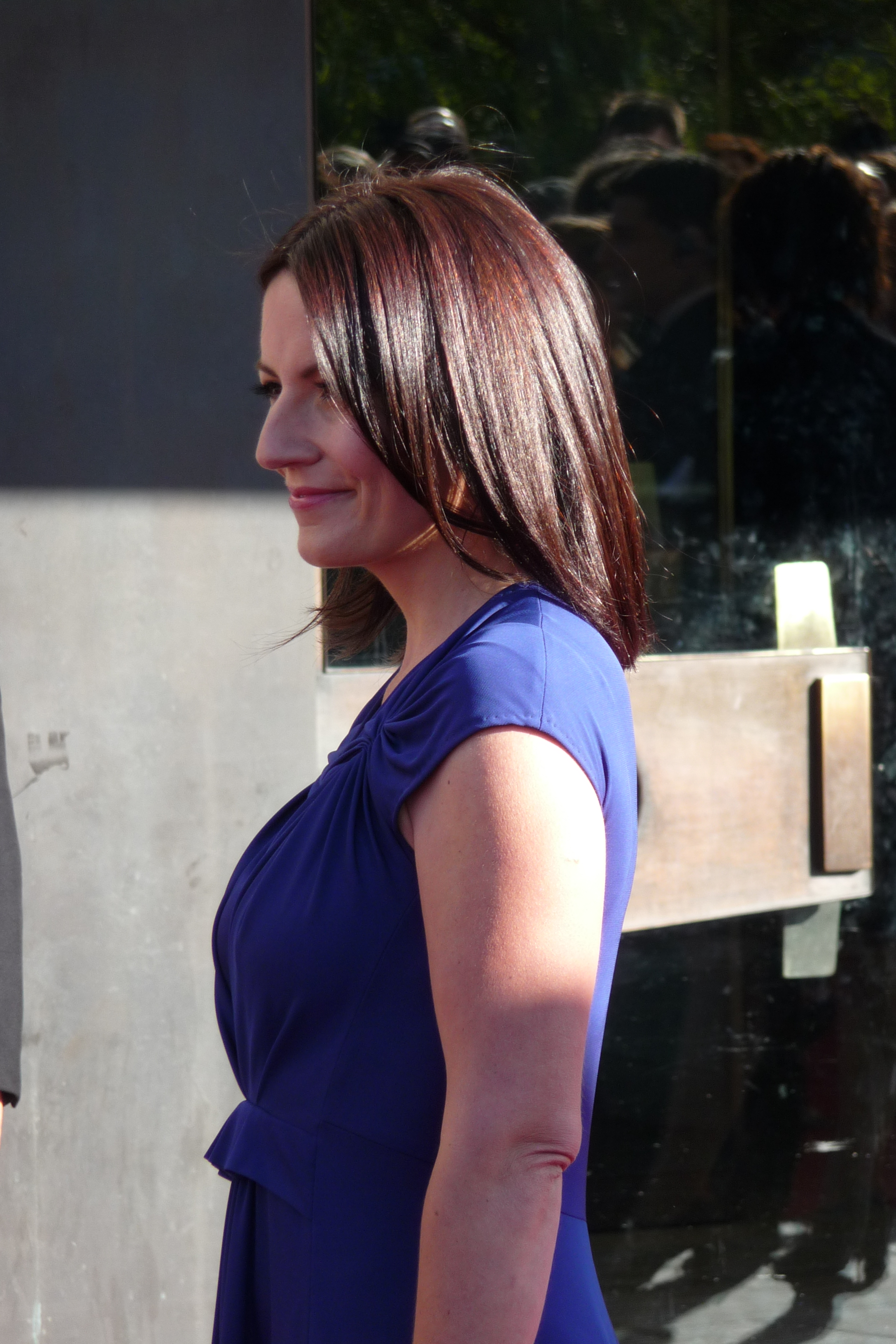
Davina McCall

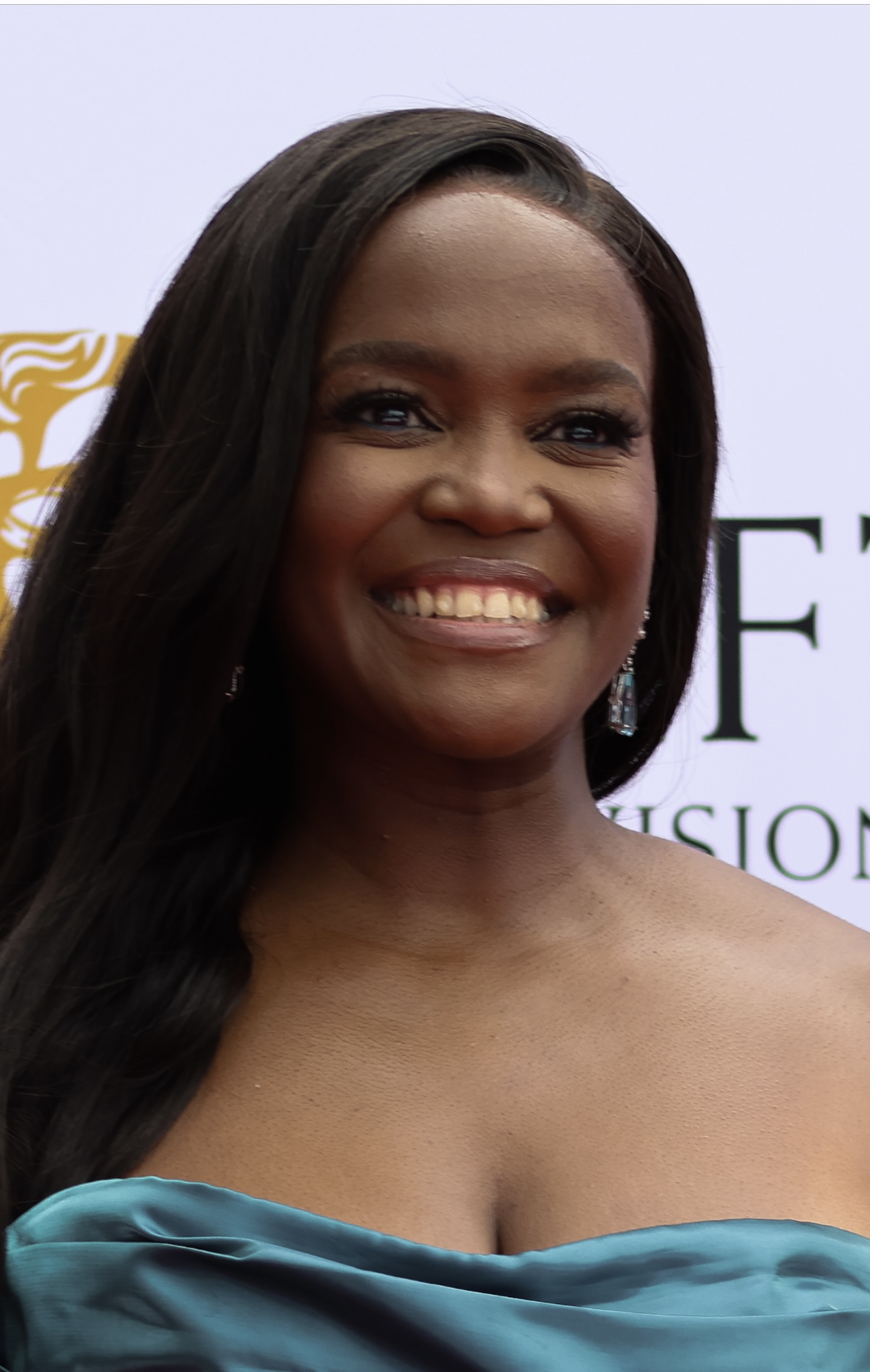
Oti Mabuse

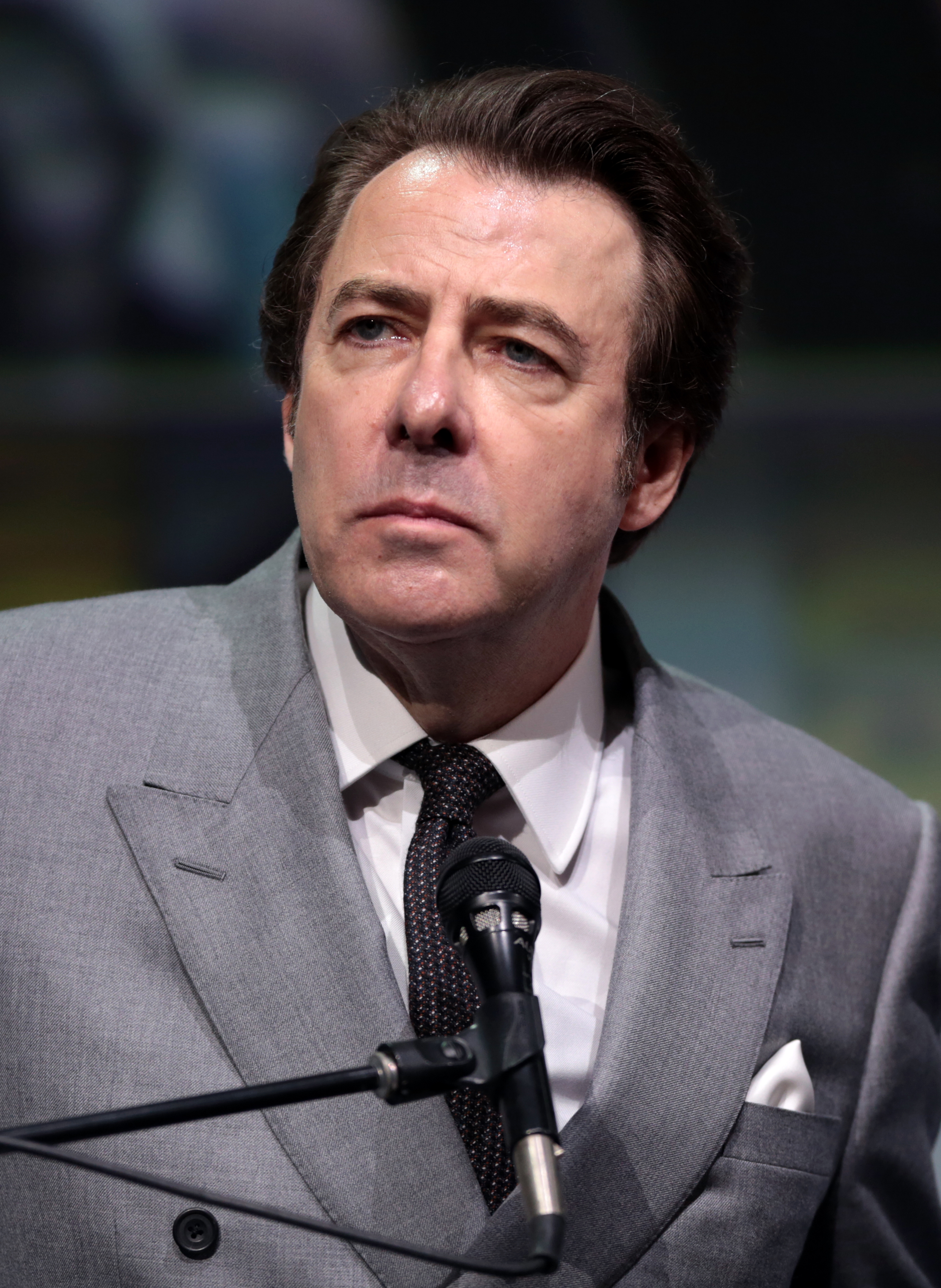
Jonathan Ross

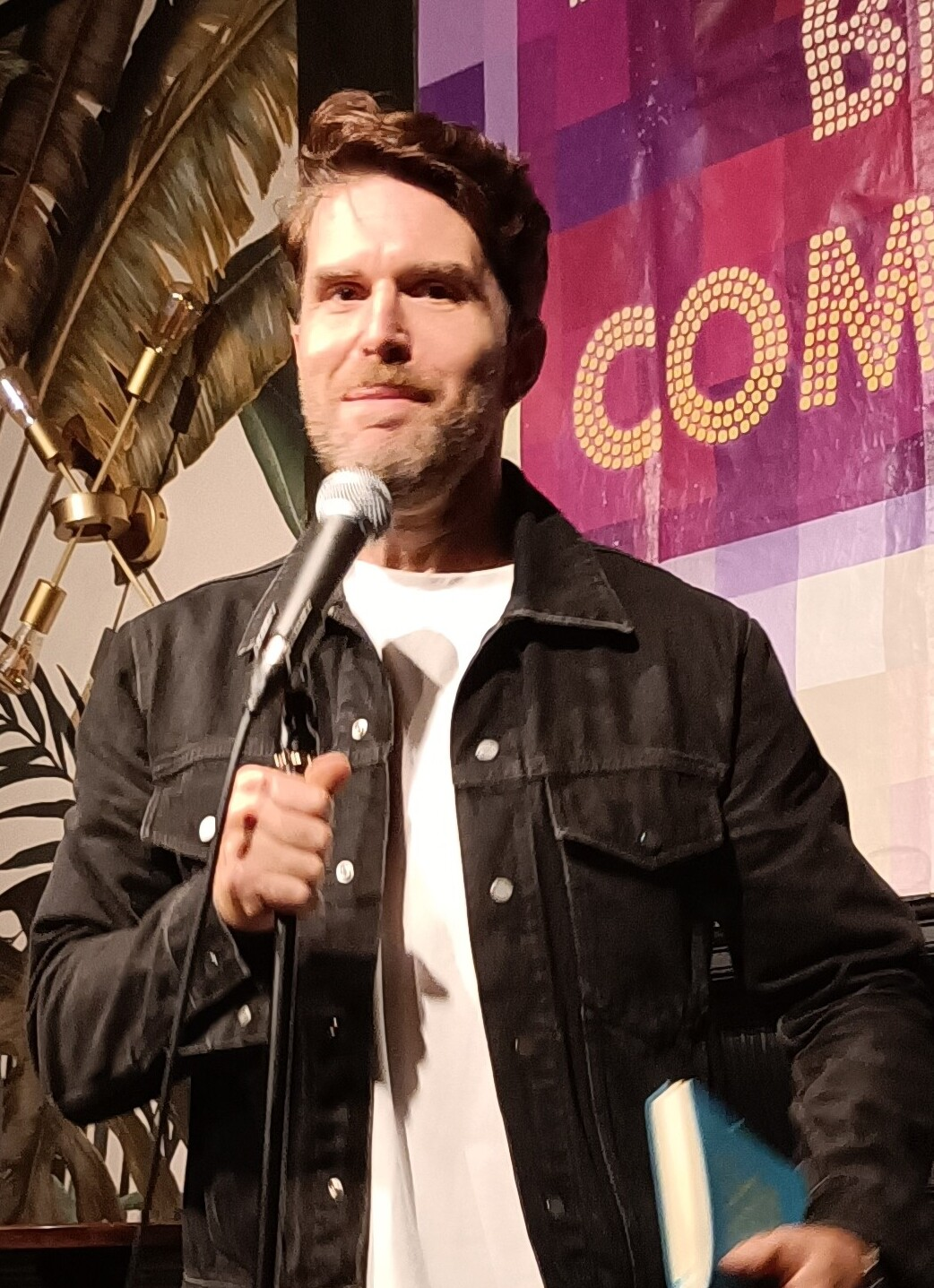
Joel Dommett

In May 2022, it was announced by ITV that Joel Dommett would return to present the series, whilst Jonathan Ross, Davina McCall, and Oti Mabuse would return to the panel. Mo Gilligan was unable to return due to other commitments, former footballer Peter Crouch was announced as his replacement. Gilligan returned as a guest panellist for the sixth episode of the series. John Bishop, a guest panellist in the previous series, appeared in the seventh episode and in place of the absent Ross for the final. Dawn French also joined the panel for the final.

== Contestants ==
The twelve celebrity costumes for the series were announced in July 2022, including the series' first duo costume, with two celebrities competing together as "Pillar and Post".

Results
Stage name	Celebrity	Occupation(s)	Episodes							
Stage name	Celebrity	Occupation(s)	1	2	3	4	5	6	7	8
Scissors	Heather Morris	Actress	WIN		RISK		SAFE	SAFE	SAFE	WINNER
Onomatopoeia	Adam Garcia	Actor		WIN		SAFE	SAFE	RISK	SAFE	RUNNER-UP
Pearly King	Bruno Tonioli	Dancer/choreographer		RISK		RISK	SAFE	SAFE	SAFE	THIRD
Odd Socks	Kimberley Walsh	Singer/actress	WIN		SAFE		RISK	SAFE	OUT	
Sea Slug	Denise Lewis	Athlete/presenter		WIN		SAFE	SAFE	SAFE	OUT	
Candlestick	Liam Charles	Baker/TV presenter	RISK		SAFE		SAFE	OUT		
Tomato Sauce	Steph McGovern	Journalist/TV presenter		WIN		SAFE	OUT			
Pillar and Post	Frankie Seaman	Ice skater	RISK		SAFE		WD (Note: Frankie broke her ankle in a fall during an earlier rehearsal which caused the duo to be automatically eliminated)			
Pillar and Post	David Seaman	Footballer	RISK		SAFE		WD			
Cactus	Gareth Malone	Choirmaster		RISK		OUT				
Prawn Cocktail	Stacey Dooley	TV presenter	WIN		OUT					
Pig	Joanna Page	Actress/TV presenter		OUT						
Astronaut	Jesse Metcalfe	Actor	OUT							

The masked dancer won their face-off and remained in the competition.
The masked dancer was safe from elimination.
The masked dancer was in the bottom three/two, but was not eliminated.
The masked dancer was eliminated from the competition and unmasked upon their elimination.
The masked dancer withdrew from the competition and was unmasked.
The masked dancer did not perform.
The masked dancer won the competition.
The masked dancer finished second.
The masked dancer finished third.
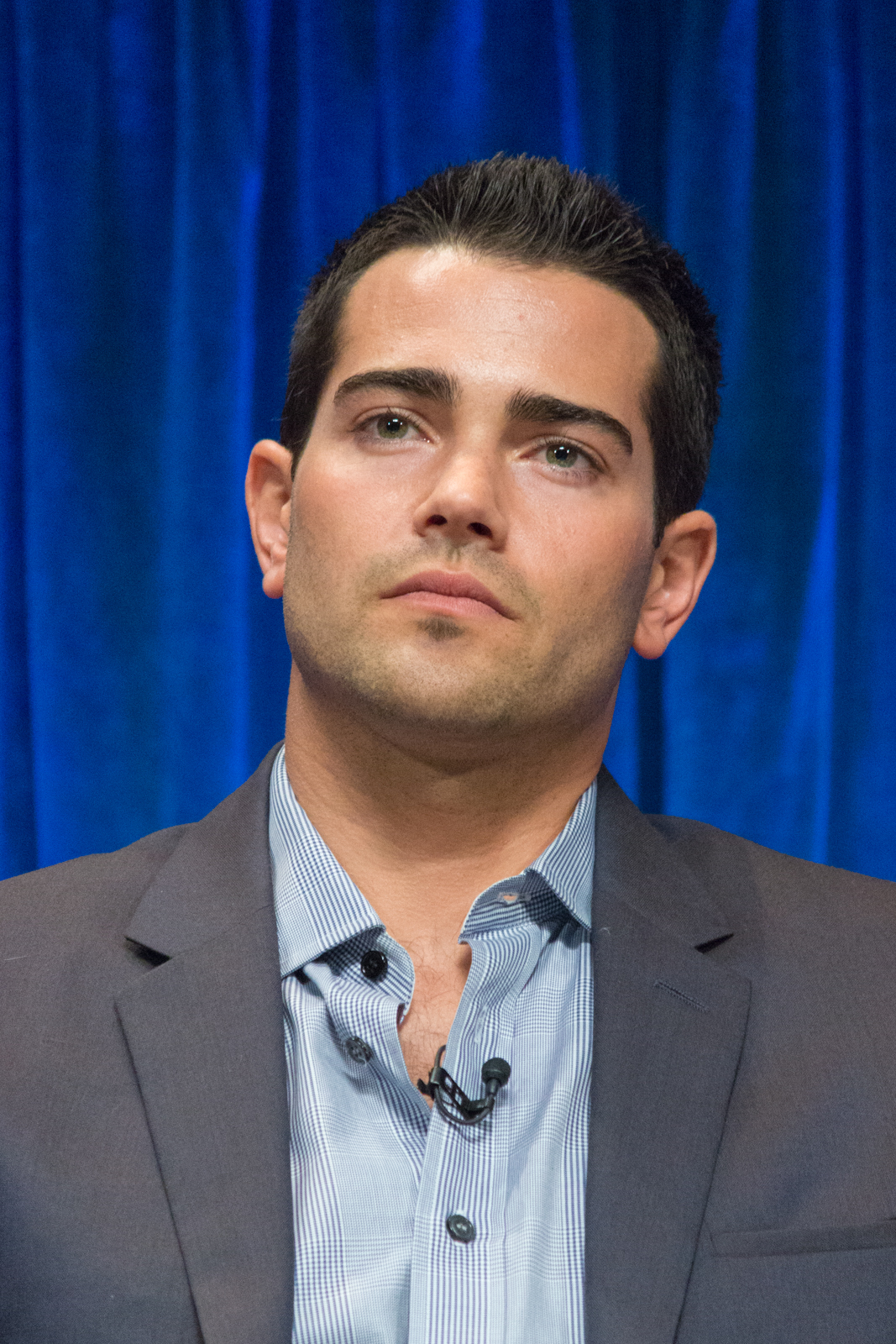
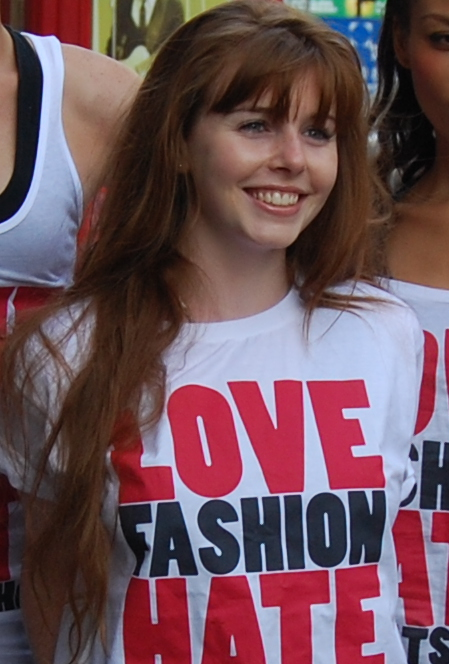
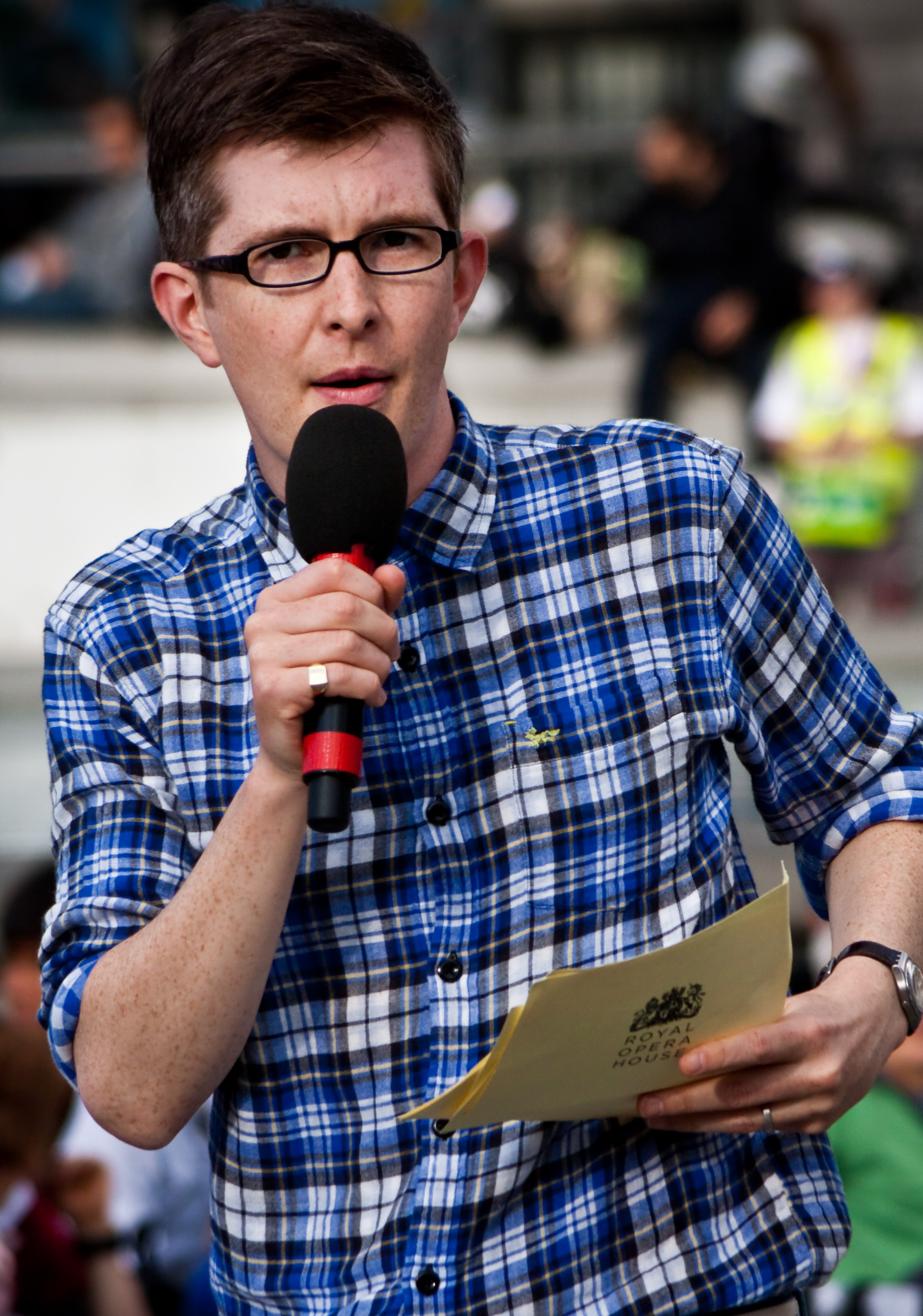
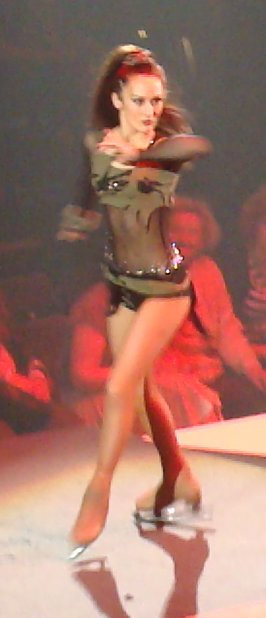
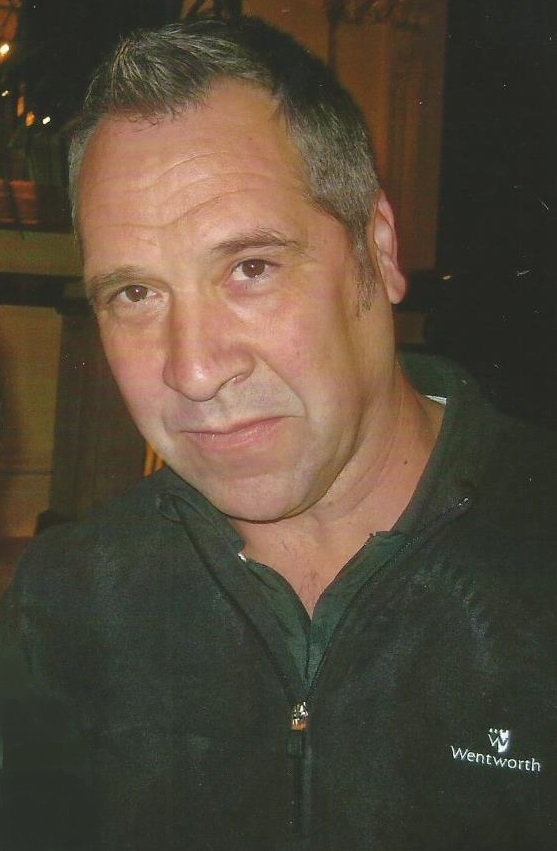
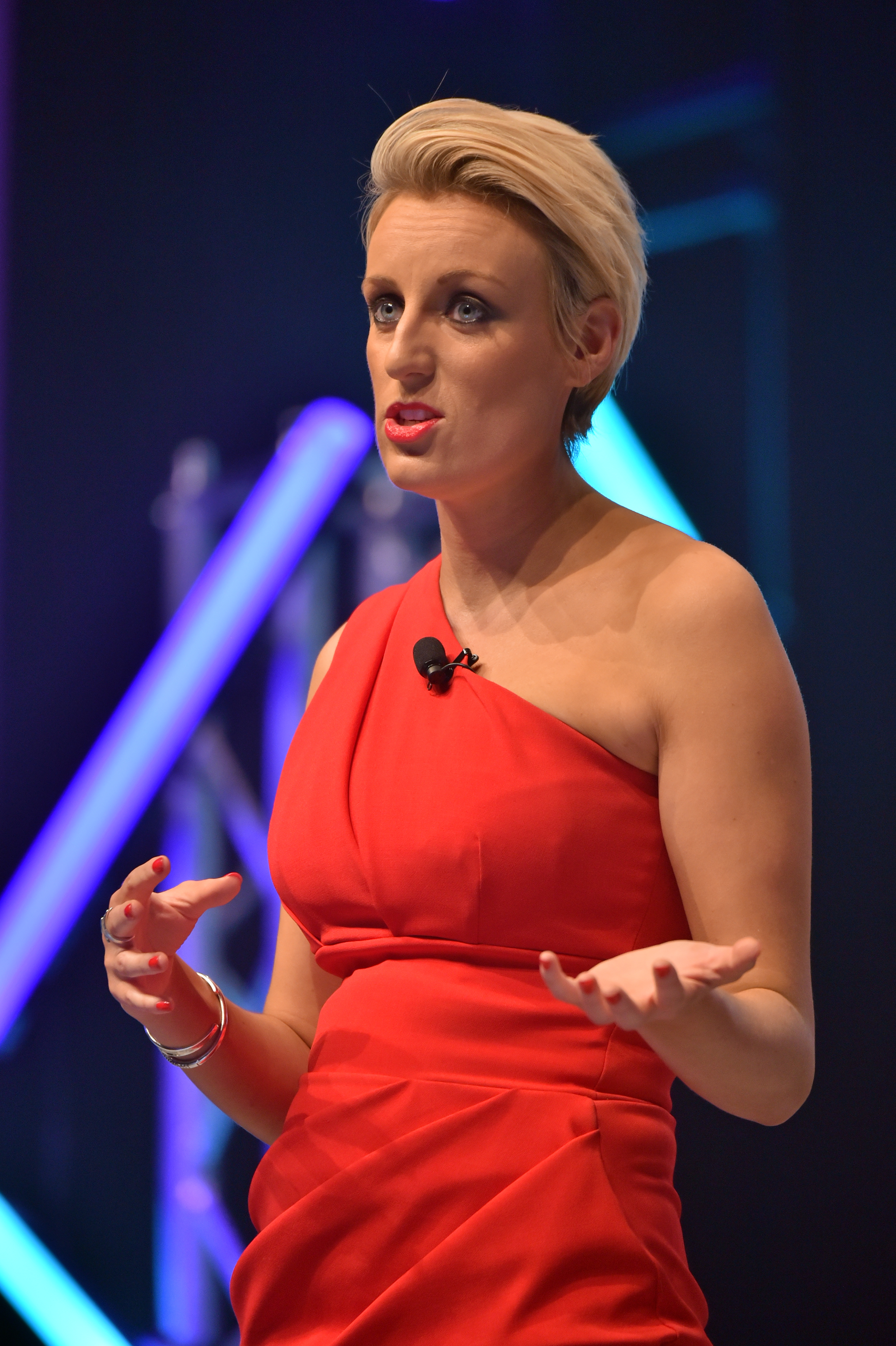
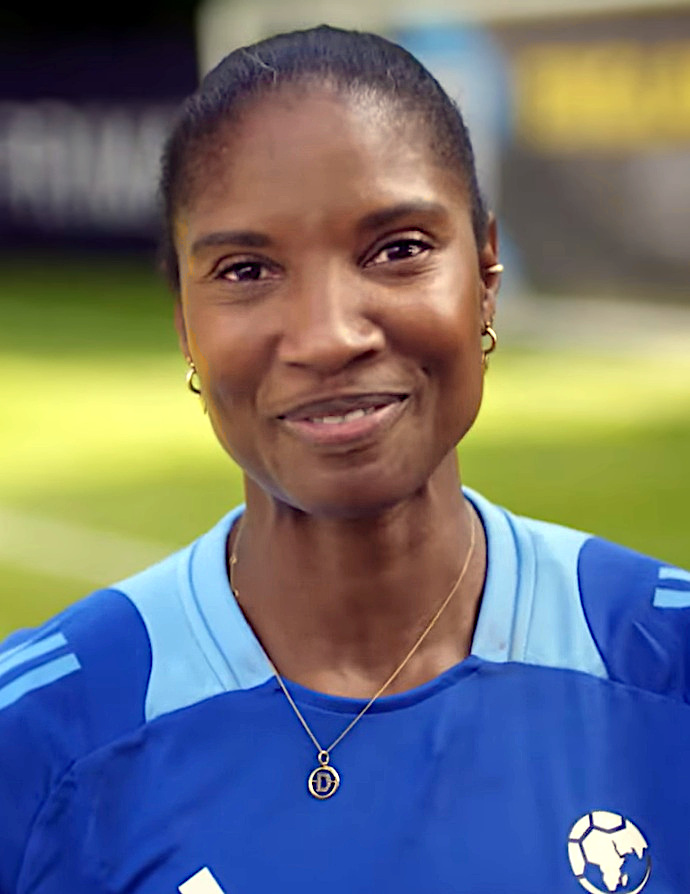
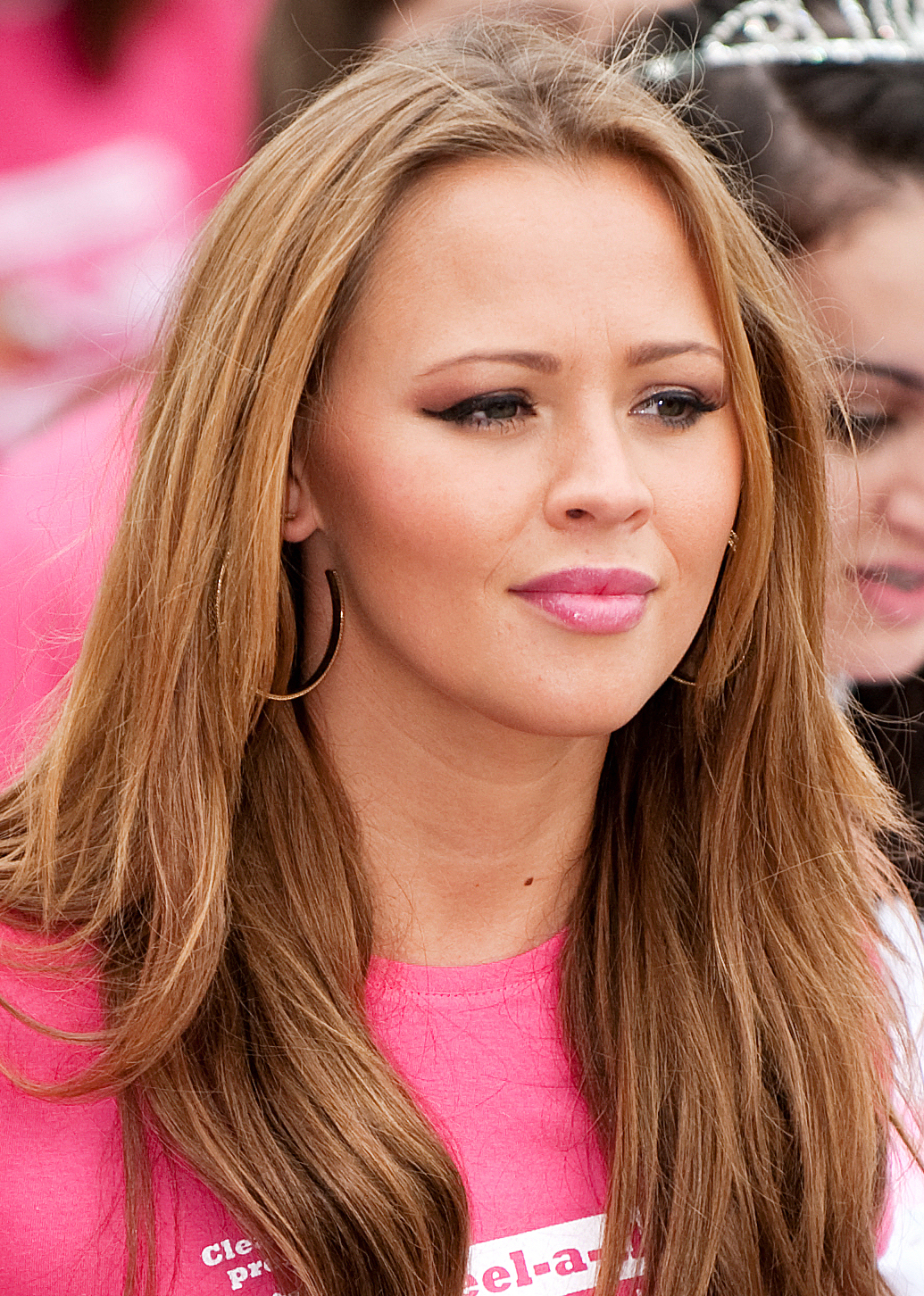
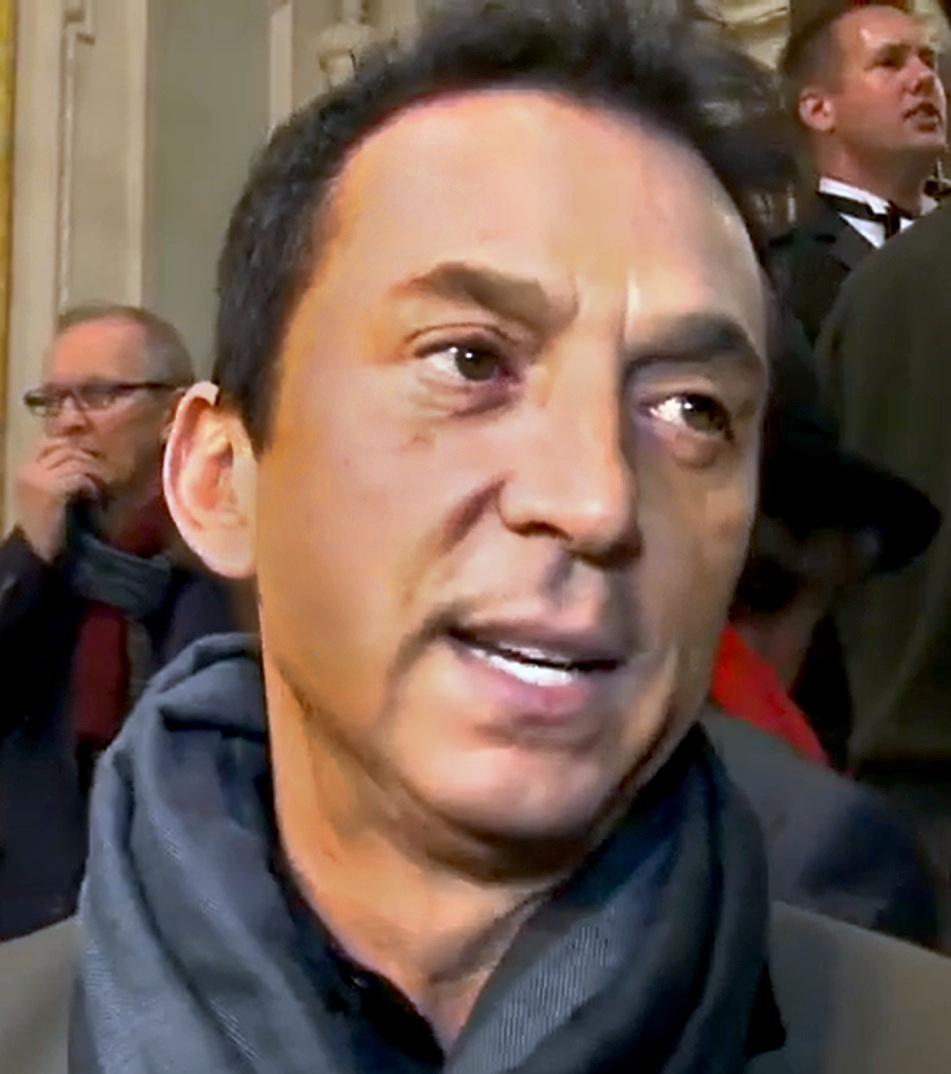
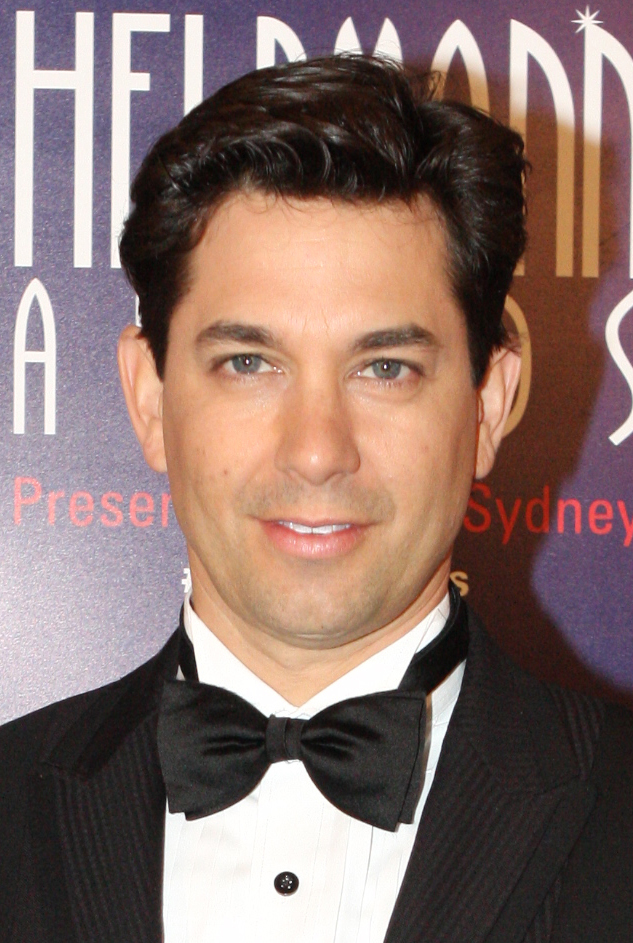
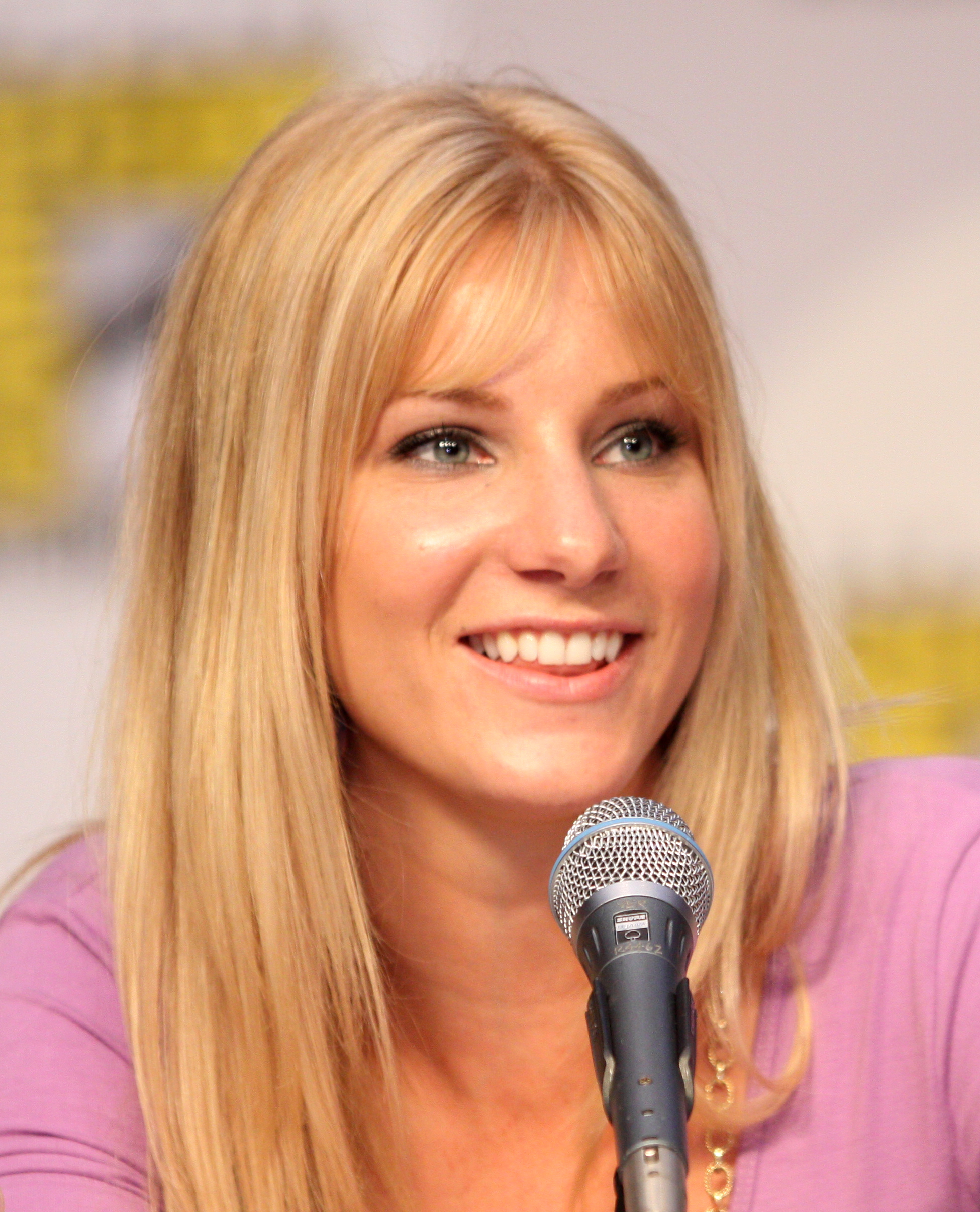
The celebrities who competed in the second series of The Masked Dancer, pictured in order of elimination (L–R):

Jesse Metcalfe ("Astronaut"), Stacey Dooley ("Prawn Cocktail"), Gareth Malone ("Cactus"), Frankie & David Seaman ("Pillar and Post"), Steph McGovern ("Tomato Sauce"), Denise Lewis ("Sea Slug"), Kimberley Walsh ("Odd Socks"), Bruno Tonioli ("Pearly King"), Adam Garcia ("Onomatopoeia"), and Heather Morris ("Scissors")

Not pictured: Joanna Page ("Pig"), and Liam Charles ("Candlestick")

== Episodes ==
=== Episode 1 (3 September) ===
- Group number: "Starstruck" by Years & Years

Performances on the first episode
#	Stage name	Song	Style	Identity	Result
1	Candlestick	"Relight My Fire" by Take That	Commercial	undisclosed	RISK
2	Scissors	"Sorry" by Justin Bieber	Samba	undisclosed	WIN
3	Astronaut	"Blinding Lights" by The Weeknd	Robotic/Street	Jesse Metcalfe	OUT
4	Odd Socks	"What a Man Gotta Do" by Jonas Brothers	Country Hoedown	undisclosed	WIN
5	Prawn Cocktail	"One Night Only" from Dreamgirls	Disco	undisclosed	WIN
6	Pillar and Post	"Please Mr. Postman" by The Marvelettes	Jazz	undisclosed	RISK
6	Pillar and Post	"Please Mr. Postman" by The Marvelettes	Jazz	undisclosed	RISK

=== Episode 2 (10 September) ===
- Group number: "Good Times" by Ella Eyre

Performances on the second episode
#	Stage name	Song	Style	Identity	Result
1	Pearly King	"Going Underground" by The Jam	Contemporary Fusion	undisclosed	RISK
2	Onomatopoeia	"Bad Habits" by Ed Sheeran	Argentine Tango	undisclosed	WIN
3	Pig	"Walking on Sunshine" by Katrina and the Waves	60's	Joanna Page	OUT
4	Sea Slug	"When I Grow Up" by The Pussycat Dolls	Sassy Commercial	undisclosed	WIN
5	Cactus	"Livin' la Vida Loca" by Ricky Martin	Jive	undisclosed	RISK
6	Tomato Sauce	"C'est la Vie" by B*Witched	Irish Dancing	undisclosed	WIN

=== Episode 3 (17 September) ===
- Group number: "You Should Be Dancing" by Bee Gees

Performances on the third episode
#	Stage name	Song	Style	Result	
1	Scissors	"So What" by P!nk	Character Rock	RISK	
2	Prawn Cocktail	"Physical" by Dua Lipa	Commercial Strut	RISK	
3	Pillar and Post	"Giant" by Calvin Harris & Rag'n'Bone Man	Partner/Lyrical	SAFE	
4	Odd Socks	"This Is How We Do It" by Montell Jordan/"It's Tricky" by Run-DMC	Hip Hop/Mashup	SAFE	
5	Candlestick	"Dangerous Love" by Fuse ODG ft. Sean Paul	Afro Beat	SAFE	
Dance Jam			Style	Identity	Result
1	Scissors	"Confident" by Demi Lovato	Commercial Sass	undisclosed	SAFE
2	Prawn Cocktail	"Girls Just Want to Have Fun" by Miley Cyrus	Modern Jazz	Stacey Dooley	OUT

=== Episode 4 (24 September) ===
- Group Number: "Turn the Beat Around"/"Conga"/"Get on Your Feet" mix by Gloria Estefan

Performances on the fourth episode
#	Stage name	Song	Style	Result	
1	Pearly King	"I Like the Way" by BodyRockers	Jazz	RISK	
2	Onomatopoeia	"Pump It"/"Boom Boom Pow" by Black Eyed Peas	Street	SAFE	
3	Tomato Sauce	"Good 4 U" by Olivia Rodrigo	Character Rock	SAFE	
4	Sea Slug	"Rockabye" by Clean Bandit ft. Sean Paul & Anne-Marie	Dance Hall	SAFE	
5	Cactus	"Too Darn Hot" by Cole Porter	Jazz	RISK	
Dance Jam			Style	Identity	Result
1	Pearly King	"I Love Rock 'n' Roll" by Arrows	Rock Strut	undisclosed	SAFE
2	Cactus	"Jump" by Kris Kross	Hip Hop	Gareth Malone	OUT

=== Episode 5 (1 October) ===
Performances on the fifth episode
#	Stage name	Song	Style	Identity	Result
1	Sea Slug	"Let's Get Loud" by Jennifer Lopez	Cha Cha	undisclosed	SAFE
2	Pearly King	"Hard to Handle" by The Black Crowes	Samba	undisclosed	SAFE
3	Onomatopoeia	"Flashdance... What a Feeling" by Irene Cara	Theatrical Jazz	undisclosed	SAFE
4	Tomato Sauce	"Red Alert" by Basement Jaxx	Disco	Steph McGovern	OUT
5	Pillar and Post	—N/a		Frankie Seaman	WD
5	Pillar and Post	—N/a		David Seaman	WD
6	Odd Socks	"Bad Romance" by Lady Gaga	Paso Doble	undisclosed	RISK
7	Scissors	"The Voice Within" by Christina Aguilera	Contemporary	undisclosed	SAFE
8	Candlestick	"Thats What I Want" by Lil Nas X	Jive	undisclosed	SAFE

=== Episode 6 (8 October) ===
- Guest panelist: Mo Gilligan

Performances on the sixth episode
#	Stage name	Song	Style	Identity	Result
1	Scissors	"Wannabe" by Spice Girls	Hip Hop	undisclosed	SAFE
2	Odd Socks	"Run the World (Girls)" by Beyoncé	Military Jazz	undisclosed	SAFE
3	Candlestick	"Finesse" by Bruno Mars	Partner Street	Liam Charles	OUT
4	Onomatopoeia	"Canned Heat" by Jamiroquai	Funk/Soul	undisclosed	RISK
5	Sea Slug	"Under the Sea" from The Little Mermaid	Theatrical Jazz	undisclosed	SAFE
6	Pearly King	"House of Fun" by Madness	Modern Stomp	undisclosed	SAFE

=== Episode 7: Semi-final (15 October) ===
- Guest panelist: John Bishop

First performances on the seventh episode
#	Stage name	Song	Style	Identity	Result
1	Odd Socks	"I'll Be There for You" by The Rembrandts	Commercial	undisclosed	RISK (Note: After the audience had voted, there was a tie between Odd Socks and Sea Slug. The panel were then given the choice to save one and saved Odd Socks)
2	Scissors	"We Don't Talk About Bruno" from Encanto	Tango	undisclosed	SAFE
3	Sea Slug	"Instruction" by Jax Jones ft. Demi Lovato	Salsa	Denise Lewis	OUT
4	Onomatopoeia	"Butter" by BTS	Tap	undisclosed	SAFE
5	Pearly King	"Youngblood" by 5 Seconds of Summer	Jazz	undisclosed	SAFE

Second performances on the seventh episode
#	Stage name	Song	Style	Identity	Result
1	Odd Socks	"You Can't Stop the Beat" from Hairspray	Musical Theatre	Kimberley Walsh	OUT
2	Scissors	"Best Song Ever" by One Direction	Fusion/Freestyle	undisclosed	SAFE
3	Onomatopoeia	"Moves Like Jagger" by Maroon 5 ft. Christina Aguilera	Street Jazz	undisclosed	SAFE
4	Pearly King	"I Like to Move It" by Reel 2 Real ft. The Mad Stuntman	Party Latin	undisclosed	SAFE

=== Episode 8: Final (22 October) ===
- Group number: "Everybody Dance" by Chic
- Guest panelists: Dawn French and John Bishop (in place of Jonathan Ross)

First performances on the eighth episode
#	Stage name	Song	Style
1	Scissors	"Respect" by Aretha Franklin	Funk/Soul
2	Onomatopoeia	"Came Here for Love" by Sigala and Ella Eyre	House
3	Pearly King	"ABCDEFU" by Gayle	Roaring Rock

Second performances on the eighth episode
#	Stage name	Song	Style	Identity	Result
1	Scissors	"Wannabe" by Spice Girls	Hip Hop	undisclosed	SAFE
2	Onomatopoeia	"Butter" by BTS	Tap	undisclosed	SAFE
3	Pearly King	"Hard to Handle" by The Black Crowes	Samba	Bruno Tonioli	THIRD PLACE

Ultimate Dance Jam
#	Stage name	Song	Identity	Result
1	Onomatopoeia	"Pop" by NSYNC	Adam Garcia	RUNNER-UP
2	Scissors	"Cut to the Feeling" by Carly Rae Jepsen	Heather Morris	WINNER

- After dancing to their individual songs in the Ultimate Dance Jam, Onomatopoeia and Scissors concluded their battle dancing to "Let's Go" by Calvin Harris simultaneously.
